= 2013–14 Australian Women's Twenty20 Cup =

Cricket tournament

- Dates: 11 October 2013 – 7 February 2014
- Administrator: Cricket Australia
- Cricket format: Twenty20
- Tournament format(s): Double round-robin and knockout
- Champions: Queensland (1st title)
- Runners-up: Australian Capital Territory
- Participants: 7
- Matches: 45
- Player of the series: (Victoria (state)) Elyse Villani
- Most runs: (Victoria (state)) Elyse Villani (498)
- Most wickets: (New South Wales) Sarah Aley (18) (Queensland) Kirsten Pike (18)
- Official website: cricket.com.au

The 2013–14 Australian Women's Twenty20 Cup was the fifth formal season of the Australian Women's Twenty20 Cup, which was the premier domestic women's Twenty20 cricket competition in Australia prior to the inception of the Women's Big Bash League in 2015. The tournament started on 11 October 2013 and finished on 7 February 2014. For the first and only time, the tournament included semi-finals. Defending champions New South Wales Breakers went unbeaten in the group stage but lost to ACT Meteors in the semi-finals. Queensland Fire won the tournament for the first time after finishing third in the group stage and beating ACT Meteors in the final.

== Ladder ==
As of 4 January 2014

Pos	Team	Pld	W	L	T	NR	Pts	NRR
1	New South Wales	12	11	0	0	1	23	1.350
2	Victoria	12	10	1	0	1	21	1.413
3	Queensland	12	7	5	0	0	14	0.348
4	Australian Capital Territory	12	5	7	0	0	10	−0.077
5	South Australia	12	4	8	0	0	8	−0.393
6	Western Australia	12	3	8	0	1	7	−0.759
7	Tasmania	12	0	11	0	1	1	−2.014

Updated to match(es) played on 4 January 2014. Source:
Rules for classification: The top four ranked teams qualified for the semi-finals.
- Points system: 2 for a win, 1 each for a tie, no result or abandonment, 0 for a loss.

== Fixtures ==
=== Semi-finals ===
Semi-final 1
5 February 2014
Scorecard

Australian Capital Territory; 8/146 (20 overs)	v	New South Wales; 134 (19.5 overs)
Nicola Browne 45 (37); Sharon Millanta 2/23 (2 overs)		Alyssa Healy 51 (44); Rene Farrell 2/25 (4 overs)

Australian Capital Territory won by 12 runs
Blacktown Olympic Park Oval, Sydney
Umpires: Greg Davidson and Damien Mealey

- Australian Capital Territory won the toss and elected to bat.

Semi-final 2
5 February 2014
Scorecard

Victoria; 6/118 (20 overs)	v	Queensland; 2/121 (15.3 overs)
Sarah Elliott 39* (25); Delissa Kimmince 2/15 (3 overs)		Beth Mooney 46* (42); Kath Hempenstall 1/21 (2.3 overs)

Queensland won by 8 wickets
Blacktown Olympic Park Oval, Sydney
Umpires: Ashley Barrow and Tony Wilds

- Queensland won the toss and elected to field.

=== Final ===
7 February 2014
Scorecard

Australian Capital Territory; 7/107 (20 overs)	v	Queensland; 3/108 (14.1 overs)
Kris Britt 33 (32); Holly Ferling 2/13 (4 overs)		Delissa Kimmince 78 (52); Rene Farrell 2/18 (4 overs)

Queensland won by 7 wickets
WACA Ground, Perth
Umpires: Gerard Abood and Geoff Joshua
Player of the match: Delissa Kimmince

- Australian Capital Territory won the toss and elected to bat.
- Queensland won the 2013–14 Australian Women's Twenty20 Cup.

== Statistics ==
=== Highest totals ===
Team	Score	Against	Venue	Date
New South Wales	3/181	Tasmania	NTCA Ground, Launceston	25 October 2013
Queensland	6/177	Tasmania	Allan Border Field, Brisbane	13 October 2013
New South Wales	4/174	South Australia	Sydney Cricket Ground	21 December 2013
Australian Capital Territory	6/161	Tasmania	Freebody Oval, Queanbeyan	8 November 2013
Victoria	1/160	South Australia	Park 25, Adelaide	18 October 2013

=== Most runs ===
Player	Team	Mat	Inns	NO	Runs	HS	Ave	BF	SR	100	50
Elyse Villani	Victoria	13	13	3	498	76*	49.80	421	118.28	0	6
Meg Lanning	Victoria	12	12	3	452	65*	50.22	364	124.17	0	3
Delissa Kimmince	Queensland	14	14	2	443	78*	36.91	358	123.74	0	3
Lauren Ebsary	South Australia	12	12	4	384	85*	48.00	334	114.97	0	3
Alex Blackwell	New South Wales	11	11	5	361	72*	60.16	298	121.14	0	3

=== Most wickets ===
Player	Team	Mat	Inns	Overs	Runs	Wkts	BBI	Ave	Econ	SR	4WI
Sarah Aley	New South Wales	11	11	38.0	211	18	3/7	11.72	5.55	12.6	0
Kirsten Pike	Queensland	14	14	50.0	276	18	4/14	15.33	5.52	16.6	1
Kath Hempenstall	Victoria	13	12	38.3	219	16	3/10	13.68	5.68	14.4	0
Erin Osborne	New South Wales	12	12	43.0	247	15	4/17	16.46	5.74	17.2	1
Rene Farrell	Australian Capital Territory	14	14	49.3	283	15	5/11	18.86	5.71	19.8	0
