= 2010–11 Australian Women's Twenty20 Cup =

Cricket tournament

- Dates: 15 October 2010 – 5 February 2011
- Administrator: Cricket Australia
- Cricket format: Twenty20
- Tournament format(s): Double round-robin and final
- Champions: Victoria (2nd title)
- Runners-up: New South Wales
- Participants: 7
- Matches: 43
- Player of the series: (South Australia) Karen Rolton
- Most runs: (South Australia) Karen Rolton (440)
- Most wickets: (Western Australia) Renee Chappell (17)
- Official website: cricket.com.au

The 2010–11 Australian Women's Twenty20 Cup was the second formal season of the Australian Women's Twenty20 Cup, which was the premier domestic women's Twenty20 cricket competition in Australia prior to the inception of the Women's Big Bash League in 2015. The tournament started on 15 October 2010 and finished on 5 February 2011. Defending champions Victorian Spirit won the tournament after finishing second in the group stage and beating New South Wales Breakers in the final.

== Ladder ==
As of 31 January 2011

| Pos | Team | Pld | W | L | T | NR | Pts | NRR |
|---|---|---|---|---|---|---|---|---|
| 1 | New South Wales | 12 | 10 | 2 | 0 | 0 | 20 | 1.789 |
| 2 | Victoria | 12 | 7 | 2 | 0 | 3 | 17 | 1.650 |
| 3 | South Australia | 12 | 8 | 4 | 0 | 0 | 16 | 0.414 |
| 4 | Australian Capital Territory | 12 | 5 | 5 | 0 | 2 | 12 | 0.251 |
| 5 | Western Australia | 12 | 5 | 7 | 0 | 0 | 10 | −0.415 |
| 6 | Queensland | 12 | 1 | 8 | 0 | 3 | 5 | −1.734 |
| 7 | Tasmania | 12 | 2 | 10 | 0 | 0 | 4 | −1.841 |

Updated to match(es) played on 31 January 2011. Source:
Rules for classification: The top two ranked teams qualified for the final.
- Points system: 2 for a win, 1 each for a tie, no result or abandonment, 0 for a loss.

== Fixtures ==
=== Final ===
5 February 2011
Scorecard

| Victoria; 5/161 (20 overs) | v | New South Wales; 9/157 (20 overs) |
| Meg Lanning 74 (56); Sharon Millanta 2/29 (4 overs) | | Leah Poulton 76 (45); Rachael Haynes 2/16 (3 overs) |

Victoria won by 4 runs.
Adelaide Oval
Umpires: Mick Martell and Tony Ward

- Victoria won the toss and elected to bat.
- Victoria won the 2010–11 Australian Women's Twenty20 Cup.

== Statistics ==
=== Highest totals ===
| Team | Score | Against | Venue | Date |
|---|---|---|---|---|
| New South Wales | 3/177 | Queensland | Allan Border Field, Brisbane | 31 October 2010 |
| Victoria | 3/175 | Tasmania | Bellerive Oval, Hobart | 12 December 2010 |
| Australian Capital Territory | 3/173 | Tasmania | NTCA Ground, Launceston | 1 November 2010 |
| New South Wales | 4/166 | Queensland | Allan Border Field, Brisbane | 29 October 2010 |
| Victoria | 4/165 | Australian Capital Territory | Manuka Oval, Canberra | 17 October 2010 |

=== Most runs ===
| Player | Team | Mat | Inns | NO | Runs | HS | Ave | BF | SR | 100 | 50 |
|---|---|---|---|---|---|---|---|---|---|---|---|
| Karen Rolton | South Australia | 12 | 12 | 3 | 440 | 58* | 48.88 | 479 | 91.85 | 0 | 3 |
| Meg Lanning | Victoria | 10 | 10 | 2 | 402 | 79 | 50.25 | 308 | 130.51 | 0 | 4 |
| Leah Poulton | New South Wales | 11 | 11 | 0 | 391 | 76 | 35.54 | 288 | 135.76 | 0 | 3 |
| Alex Blackwell | New South Wales | 9 | 8 | 3 | 272 | 99* | 54.40 | 205 | 132.68 | 0 | 1 |
| Lauren Ebsary | South Australia | 12 | 10 | 5 | 269 | 53* | 53.80 | 264 | 101.89 | 0 | 2 |

=== Most wickets ===
| Player | Team | Mat | Inns | Overs | Runs | Wkts | BBI | Ave | Econ | SR | 4WI |
|---|---|---|---|---|---|---|---|---|---|---|---|
| Renee Chappell | Western Australia | 12 | 11 | 38.0 | 185 | 17 | 3/14 | 10.88 | 4.86 | 13.4 | 0 |
| Lisa Sthalekar | New South Wales | 11 | 10 | 38.0 | 166 | 16 | 5/11 | 10.37 | 4.36 | 14.2 | 0 |
| Karen Rolton | South Australia | 12 | 12 | 43.4 | 213 | 16 | 3/16 | 13.31 | 4.87 | 16.3 | 0 |
| Clea Smith | Victoria | 10 | 10 | 37.0 | 218 | 15 | 3/16 | 14.53 | 5.89 | 14.8 | 0 |
| Cara Fiebig | South Australia | 12 | 10 | 28.2 | 154 | 13 | 4/11 | 11.84 | 5.43 | 13.0 | 1 |
