= 2011–12 Australian Women's Twenty20 Cup =

Cricket tournament

- Dates: 21 October 2011 – 12 January 2012
- Administrator: Cricket Australia
- Cricket format: Twenty20
- Tournament format(s): Double round-robin and final
- Champions: Victoria (3rd title)
- Runners-up: New South Wales
- Participants: 7
- Matches: 43
- Player of the series: (Victoria (state)) Meg Lanning
- Most runs: (Queensland) Melissa Bulow (505)
- Most wickets: (Queensland) Jemma Barsby (18)
- Official website: cricket.com.au

The 2011–12 Australian Women's Twenty20 Cup was the third formal season of the Australian Women's Twenty20 Cup, which was the premier domestic women's Twenty20 cricket competition in Australia prior to the inception of the Women's Big Bash League in 2015. The tournament started on 21 October 2011 and finished on 12 January 2012. Defending champions Victorian Spirit won the tournament for the third time after finishing second in the group stage and beating New South Wales Breakers in the final. This marked the Breakers' third final loss in as many tournaments, each time after topping the ladder.

== Ladder ==
As of 9 January 2012

Pos	Team	Pld	W	L	T	NR	Pts	NRR
1	New South Wales	12	10	0	0	2	22	2.092
2	Victoria	12	9	2	0	1	19	1.611
3	Queensland	12	8	3	1	0	17	1.220
4	Australian Capital Territory	12	4	6	1	1	10	−0.467
5	South Australia	12	5	7	0	0	10	−0.570
6	Western Australia	12	2	10	0	0	4	−1.505
7	Tasmania	12	1	11	0	0	2	−1.685

Updated to match(es) played on 9 January 2012. Source:
Rules for classification: The top two ranked teams qualified for the final.
- Points system: 2 for a win, 1 each for a tie, no result or abandonment, 0 for a loss.

== Fixtures ==
=== Final ===
12 January 2012
Scorecard

Victoria; 7/143 (20 overs)	v	New South Wales; 9/134 (20 overs)
Jess Cameron 50 (39); Sarah Coyte 2/20 (4 overs)		Alex Blackwell 41 (43); Kath Hempenstall 3/22 (4 overs)

Victoria won by 9 runs.
Docklands Stadium, Melbourne
Umpires: Ashley Barrow and Angelo Sammartino

- Victoria won the toss and elected to bat.
- Victoria won the 2011–12 Australian Women's Twenty20 Cup.

== Statistics ==
=== Highest totals ===
Team	Score	Against	Venue	Date
New South Wales	2/181	Australian Capital Territory	Manuka Oval, Canberra	27 November 2011
New South Wales	4/175	Western Australia	WACA Ground, Perth	21 October 2011
Queensland	3/172	Tasmania	Allan Border Field, Brisbane	21 October 2011
Australian Capital Territory	4/162	Western Australia	Murdoch University Ground, Perth	16 December 2011
Queensland	2/161	South Australia	Woodville Oval, Adelaide	2 December 2011

=== Most runs ===
Player	Team	Mat	Inns	NO	Runs	HS	Ave	BF	SR	100	50
Melissa Bulow	Queensland	12	12	2	505	103	50.50	423	119.38	1	4
Meg Lanning	Victoria	13	13	2	411	68	37.36	327	125.68	0	4
Leah Poulton	New South Wales	12	12	4	405	103*	50.62	307	131.92	1	1
Jess Cameron	Victoria	13	13	3	375	66	37.50	302	124.17	0	4
Kris Britt	Australian Capital Territory	11	11	1	347	77	34.70	336	103.27	0	1

=== Most wickets ===
Player	Team	Mat	Inns	Overs	Runs	Wkts	BBI	Ave	Econ	SR	4WI
Jemma Barsby	Queensland	12	11	39.0	180	18	4/8	10.00	4.61	13.0	2
Sarah Coyte	New South Wales	12	12	43.0	205	17	3/10	12.05	4.76	15.1	0
Sharon Millanta	New South Wales	12	12	43.3	225	17	5/10	13.23	5.17	15.3	0
Charlotte Anneveld	Australian Capital Territory	11	9	28.0	163	16	5/22	10.18	5.82	10.5	1
Shelley Nitschke	South Australia	12	12	41.0	253	16	3/15	15.81	6.17	15.3	0
