= 2012–13 Australian Women's Twenty20 Cup =

Cricket tournament

- Dates: 12 October 2012 – 19 January 2013
- Administrator: Cricket Australia
- Cricket format: Twenty20
- Tournament format(s): Double round-robin and final
- Champions: New South Wales (1st title)
- Runners-up: Western Australia
- Participants: 7
- Matches: 43
- Player of the series: (Western Australia) Jenny Wallace
- Most runs: (New South Wales) Alex Blackwell (377)
- Most wickets: (New South Wales) Lisa Sthalekar (16) (South Australia) Lauren Ebsary (16)
- Official website: cricket.com.au

The 2012–13 Australian Women's Twenty20 Cup was the fourth formal season of the Australian Women's Twenty20 Cup, which was the premier domestic women's Twenty20 cricket competition in Australia prior to the inception of the Women's Big Bash League in 2015. The tournament started on 12 October 2012 and finished on 19 January 2013. Defending champions Victorian Spirit finished third. New South Wales Breakers won the tournament for the first time after finishing first in the group stage and beating Western Fury in the final.

== Ladder ==
As of 7 January 2013

Pos	Team	Pld	W	L	T	NR	Pts	NRR
1	New South Wales	12	12	0	0	0	24	2.120
2	Western Australia	12	7	4	1	0	15	−0.148
3	Victoria	12	6	5	1	0	13	0.245
4	Australian Capital Territory	12	6	6	0	0	12	−0.042
5	Queensland	12	4	7	1	0	9	−0.253
6	Tasmania	12	4	8	0	0	8	−0.523
7	South Australia	12	1	10	1	0	3	−1.228

Updated to match(es) played on 7 January 2013. Source:
Rules for classification: The top two ranked teams qualified for the final.
- Points system: 2 for a win, 1 each for a tie, no result or abandonment, 0 for a loss.

== Fixtures ==
=== Final ===
19 January 2013
Scorecard

Western Australia; 5/126 (20 overs)	v	New South Wales; 5/130 (19.2 overs)
Suzie Bates 41 (48); Sarah Coyte 2/18 (4 overs)		Leah Poulton 41 (31); Suzie Bates 1/9 (2.2 overs)

New South Wales won by 5 wickets.
WACA Ground, Perth
Umpires: Matthew Hall and Dean Trigg

- Western Australia won the toss and elected to bat.
- New South Wales won the 2012–13 Australian Women's Twenty20 Cup.

== Statistics ==
=== Highest totals ===
Team	Score	Against	Venue	Date
New South Wales	6/173	Victoria	Melbourne Cricket Ground	6 January 2013
New South Wales	4/166	Australian Capital Territory	Blacktown Olympic Park Oval, Sydney	19 October 2012
Tasmania	6/165	Victoria	Bellerive Oval, Hobart	22 December 2012
Queensland	4/154	South Australia	Allan Border Field, Brisbane	14 October 2012
Victoria	4/151	Queensland	Allan Border Field, Brisbane	7 December 2012

=== Most runs ===
Player	Team	Mat	Inns	NO	Runs	HS	Ave	BF	SR	100	50
Alex Blackwell	New South Wales	13	11	4	377	58*	53.85	321	117.44	0	3
Leah Poulton	New South Wales	13	13	3	359	52*	35.90	332	108.13	0	1
Jenny Wallace	Western Australia	13	13	1	315	55	26.25	345	91.30	0	1
Jodie Fields	Queensland	12	11	3	313	54*	39.12	302	103.64	0	2
Alyssa Healy	New South Wales	13	13	1	306	62	25.50	262	116.79	0	4

=== Most wickets ===
Player	Team	Mat	Inns	Overs	Runs	Wkts	BBI	Ave	Econ	SR	4WI
Lisa Sthalekar	New South Wales	12	12	43.4	205	16	4/25	12.81	4.69	16.3	1
Lauren Ebsary	South Australia	12	12	32.3	242	16	5/19	15.12	7.44	12.1	0
Molly Strano	Victoria	12	11	37.0	221	15	4/15	14.73	5.97	14.8	1
Sarah Coyte	New South Wales	8	7	26.0	159	14	3/7	11.35	6.11	11.1	0
Briana Binch	Victoria	11	10	36.0	208	14	3/8	14.85	5.77	15.4	0
