= Australian Women's Twenty20 Cup =

Women's cricket competition in Australia from 2007 to 2015

- Countries: Australia
- Administrator: Cricket Australia
- Format: Twenty20
- First edition: 2009–10
- Latest edition: 2014–15
- Tournament format: Double round-robin and final
- Number of teams: 7
- Most successful: Victoria (3 titles)
- Most runs: Meg Lanning – 2,087
- Most wickets: Jemma Barsby – 62

The Australian Women's Twenty20 Cup (WT20) was the premier domestic women's Twenty20 cricket competition in Australia. Beginning in 2007 as a series of exhibition matches, the first official tournament took place during the summer of 2009–10. All seven state and territory representative teams from its 50-over counterpart, the pre-existing Women's National Cricket League, participated in the WT20's formal six-year span. The competition was replaced by the Women's Big Bash League in 2015.

The Victorian Spirit were the most successful team, having managed to claim three titles in a row. The New South Wales Breakers finished on top of the ladder at the conclusion of every regular season, but they lost three consecutive championship deciders against Victoria before eventually winning two titles of their own. The Queensland Fire also won one title.

== Tournament structure ==
After experimenting with an informal five-match exhibition structure for each of its first two editions, Cricket Australia delivered a fully-fledged competition for the 2009–10 season which was made up of a single round-robin before a final between the two highest-ranked teams. For 2010–11 and onward, the structure of the tournament was expanded to twelve rounds and a final (or, in the case of the 2013–14 edition, a finals series featuring the four highest-ranked teams) to determine each season's champion.

The competition was typically scheduled alongside, and interspersed with, the Women's National Cricket League as each team would draw from the same squad for both formats. In what was promoted as an "unprecedented" boost to the visibility of the women's game, the 2014–15 season featured eight fixtures paired as double-headers with the men's Big Bash League. This included the championship decider which was also broadcast live and nationally on free-to-air network Ten.

On 19 February 2015, Cricket Australia announced that the competition would be replaced by the Women's Big Bash League. The decision was made in an attempt to further heighten the profile and professionalism of elite-level women's cricket, thereby ideally helping to grow grassroots participation and viewership of the game among girls and women across the country.

== Teams ==
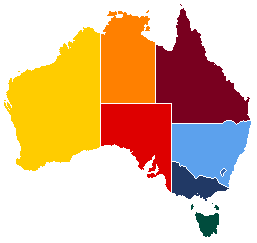
Map of Australia with each state/territory shaded in its cricket team's main colour.

The Australian Women's Twenty20 Cup featured the same seven teams that competed in the Women's National Cricket League from the corresponding period of 2009 to 2015. In addition to each team's primary ground, matches were also played at a wide variety of alternate and boutique venues.

Team	Nickname	Home ground	Established	Titles won
Australian Capital Territory	Meteors	Manuka Oval	2009	0
New South Wales	Breakers	Sydney Cricket Ground	1996	2
Queensland	Fire	The Gabba	1996	1
South Australia	Scorpions	Adelaide Oval	1996	0
Tasmania	Roar	Bellerive Oval	2009	0
Victoria	Spirit	Melbourne Cricket Ground	1996	3
Western Australia	Fury	WACA Ground	1996	0

== Tournament results ==
=== Season summaries ===
Season	Champions	Most runs	Most wickets	Player of the Season	Sources
2009–10	Victoria	Leah Poulton (NSW) – 201	Sarah Elliott (VIC) – 13	Alex Blackwell (NSW)	
2010–11	Victoria	Karen Rolton (SA) – 440	Renee Chappell (WA) – 17	Karen Rolton (SA)	
2011–12	Victoria	Melissa Bulow (QLD) – 505	Jemma Barsby (QLD) – 18	Meg Lanning (VIC)	
2012–13	New South Wales	Alex Blackwell (NSW) – 377	Sthalekar (NSW), Ebsary (SA) – 16	Jenny Wallace (WA)	
2013–14	Queensland	Elyse Villani (VIC) – 498	Aley (NSW), Pike (QLD) – 18	Elyse Villani (VIC)	
2014–15	New South Wales	Alex Blackwell (NSW) – 451	Molly Strano (VIC) – 22	Heather Knight (TAS)	

=== Final summaries ===
Final	1st Innings	2nd Innings	Result	Player of the Final	Venue
2009–10	Victoria; 5/127 (20 overs)	New South Wales; 75 (16 overs)	Victoria won by 52 runs Scorecard	Clea Smith (Victoria)	Adelaide Oval; Adelaide, SA
2010–11	Victoria; 5/161 (20 overs)	New South Wales; 9/157 (20 overs)	Victoria won by 4 runs Scorecard	Meg Lanning (Victoria)	Adelaide Oval; Adelaide, SA
2011–12	Victoria; 7/143 (20 overs)	New South Wales; 9/134 (20 overs)	Victoria won by 9 runs Scorecard	Danielle Wyatt (Victoria)	Docklands Stadium; Melbourne, VIC
2012–13	Western Australia; 5/126 (20 overs)	New South Wales; 5/130 (19.2 overs)	New South Wales won by 5 wickets Scorecard	Alex Blackwell (New South Wales)	WACA Ground; Perth, WA
2013–14	Australian Capital Territory; 7/107 (20 overs)	Queensland; 3/108 (14.2 overs)	Queensland won by 7 wickets Scorecard	Delissa Kimmince (Queensland)	WACA Ground; Perth, WA
2014–15	New South Wales; 3/175 (20 overs)	Victoria; 8/124 (20 overs)	New South Wales won by 51 runs Scorecard	Alex Blackwell (New South Wales)	Manuka Oval; Canberra, ACT

=== Team performance ===
Team	2009–10	2010–11	2011–12	2012–13	2013–14	2014–15
Australian Capital Territory	3rd	4th	5th	4th	4th (RU)	7th
New South Wales	1st (RU)	1st (RU)	1st (RU)	1st (C)	1st (SF)	1st (C)
Queensland	4th	6th	3rd	5th	3rd (C)	3rd
South Australia	5th	3rd	4th	7th	5th	5th
Tasmania	7th	7th	7th	6th	7th	4th
Victoria	2nd (C)	2nd (C)	2nd (C)	3rd	2nd (SF)	2nd (RU)
Western Australia	6th	5th	6th	2nd (RU)	6th	6th

Legend
C = Champions; RU = Runners-up; SF = Semi-finalists; 1st = Ladder position after regular season

== Statistics ==
=== Most runs ===
Player (Team)	Mat	Inns	Runs	HS	Ave	SR
Meg Lanning (VIC)	66	66	2087	82	40.13	123.86
Leah Poulton (NSW)	68	37	2011	103*	34.67	122.85
Alex Blackwell (NSW)	64	60	1915	99*	54.71	119.46
Elyse Villani (VIC)	65	64	1584	79*	31.06	107.83
Lauren Ebsary (WA, SA)	65	63	1514	85*	30.28	105.80

=== Most wickets ===
Player (Team)	Mat	Overs	Wkts	Ave	Econ
Jemma Barsby (QLD)	60	187.5	62	17.89	5.90
Erin Osborne (NSW)	60	204	61	17.77	5.31
Sarah Coyte (NSW)	59	182	54	19.19	5.69
Briana Binch (VIC)	65	182.1	54	20.54	6.09
Sharon Millanta (NSW)	57	162.3	49	18.31	5.52
