= 2014–15 Australian Women's Twenty20 Cup =

Cricket tournament

- Dates: 10 October 2014 – 28 January 2015
- Administrator: Cricket Australia
- Cricket format: Twenty20
- Tournament format(s): Double round-robin and final
- Champions: New South Wales (2nd title)
- Runners-up: Victoria
- Participants: 7
- Matches: 43
- Player of the series: (Tasmania) Heather Knight
- Most runs: (New South Wales) Alex Blackwell (451)
- Most wickets: (Victoria (state)) Molly Strano (22)
- Official website: cricket.com.au

The 2014–15 Australian Women's Twenty20 Cup was the sixth and last formal season of the Australian Women's Twenty20 Cup, which was the premier domestic women's Twenty20 cricket competition in Australia prior to the inception of the Women's Big Bash League in 2015. The tournament started on 10 October 2014 and finished on 28 January 2015. The defending champions were Queensland Fire, who finished third. New South Wales Breakers won the tournament for the second time after finishing first in the group stage and beating Victorian Spirit in the final.

== Ladder ==
As of 12 January 2015

Pos	Team	Pld	W	L	T	NR	Pts	NRR
1	New South Wales	12	9	2	0	1	19	1.397
2	Victoria	12	9	3	0	0	18	1.219
3	Queensland	12	9	3	0	0	18	0.487
4	Tasmania	12	6	6	0	0	12	−0.569
5	South Australia	12	5	6	0	1	11	−0.247
6	Western Australia	12	2	10	0	0	4	−0.573
7	Australian Capital Territory	12	1	11	0	0	2	−1.449

Updated to match(es) played on 12 January 2015. Source:
Rules for classification: The top two ranked teams qualified for the final.
- Points system: 2 for a win, 1 each for a tie, no result or abandonment, 0 for a loss.

== Fixtures ==
=== Final ===
28 January 2015
Scorecard

New South Wales; 3/175 (20 overs)	v	Victoria; 8/124 (20 overs)
Alex Blackwell 72 (43); Molly Strano 2/35 (4 overs)		Meg Lanning 72 (42); Erin Osborne 5/27 (4 overs)

New South Wales won by 51 runs
Manuka Oval, Canberra
Umpires: Gerard Abood and Ashley Barrow
Player of the match: Alex Blackwell

- New South Wales won the toss and elected to bat.
- New South Wales won the 2014–15 Australian Women's Twenty20 Cup.

== Statistics ==
=== Highest totals ===
Team	Score	Against	Venue	Date
Queensland	8/179	Australian Capital Territory	Manuka Oval, Canberra	21 December 2014
New South Wales	2/177	Western Australia	Blacktown Olympic Park Oval, Sydney	12 December 2014
Australian Capital Territory	4/176	Queensland	Manuka Oval, Canberra	21 December 2014
New South Wales	3/175	Victoria	Manuka Oval, Canberra	28 January 2015
Tasmania	2/167	Australian Capital Territory	Bellerive Oval, Hobart	10 January 2015

=== Most runs ===
Player	Team	Mat	Inns	NO	Runs	HS	Ave	BF	SR	100	50
Alex Blackwell	New South Wales	12	12	7	451	72	90.20	387	116.53	0	3
Meg Lanning	Victoria	13	13	4	445	82	49.44	337	132.04	0	4
Heather Knight	Tasmania	10	10	3	419	72*	59.85	373	112.33	0	5
Charlotte Edwards	Western Australia	12	12	2	413	66*	41.30	375	110.13	0	3
Elyse Villani	Victoria	13	13	4	372	79*	41.33	349	106.59	0	4

=== Most wickets ===
Player	Team	Mat	Inns	Overs	Runs	Wkts	BBI	Ave	Econ	SR	4WI
Molly Strano	Victoria	13	13	46.0	277	22	4/15	12.59	6.02	12.5	2
Jemma Barsby	Queensland	12	12	41.0	250	19	4/9	13.15	6.09	12.9	1
Sarah Aley	New South Wales	12	12	36.5	224	14	2/15	16.00	6.08	15.7	0
Erin Osborne	New South Wales	11	11	38.0	197	13	5/27	15.15	5.18	17.5	0
Amanda-Jade Wellington	South Australia	11	11	34.0	212	13	3/21	16.30	6.23	15.6	0
