= 2009–10 Australian Women's Twenty20 Cup =

Cricket tournament

- Dates: 23 October 2009 – 23 January 2010
- Administrator: Cricket Australia
- Cricket format: Twenty20
- Tournament format(s): Single round-robin and final
- Champions: Victoria (1st title)
- Runners-up: New South Wales
- Participants: 7
- Matches: 22
- Player of the series: (New South Wales) Alex Blackwell
- Most runs: (New South Wales) Leah Poulton (201)
- Most wickets: (Victoria (state)) Sarah Elliott (13)
- Official website: cricket.com.au

The 2009–10 Australian Women's Twenty20 Cup was the first formal season of the Australian Women's Twenty20 Cup, which was the premier domestic women's Twenty20 cricket competition in Australia prior to the inception of the Women's Big Bash League in 2015. The tournament started on 23 October 2009 and finished on 23 January 2010. Victorian Spirit won the tournament after finishing second in the group stage and beating New South Wales Breakers in the final.

== Ladder ==
As of 17 January 2010

| Pos | Team | Pld | W | L | T | NR | Pts | NRR |
|---|---|---|---|---|---|---|---|---|
| 1 | New South Wales | 6 | 5 | 1 | 0 | 0 | 10 | 2.443 |
| 2 | Victoria | 6 | 5 | 1 | 0 | 0 | 10 | 1.580 |
| 3 | Australian Capital Territory | 6 | 3 | 3 | 0 | 0 | 6 | 0.224 |
| 4 | Queensland | 6 | 3 | 3 | 0 | 0 | 6 | −0.813 |
| 5 | South Australia | 6 | 2 | 4 | 0 | 0 | 4 | −0.319 |
| 6 | Western Australia | 6 | 2 | 4 | 0 | 0 | 4 | −1.062 |
| 7 | Tasmania | 6 | 1 | 5 | 0 | 0 | 2 | −1.668 |

Updated to match(es) played on 17 January 2010. Source:
Rules for classification: The top two ranked teams qualified for the final.
- Points system: 2 for a win, 1 each for a tie, no result or abandonment, 0 for a loss.

== Fixtures ==
=== Final ===
23 January 2010
Scorecard

| Victoria; 5/127 (20 overs) | v | New South Wales; 75 (16 overs) |
| Elyse Villani 29 (27); Sarah Andrews 1/12 (4 overs) | | Sarah Andrews 15 (11); Julie Hunter 2/7 (2 overs) |

Victoria won by 52 runs.
Adelaide Oval
Umpires: Andrew Collins and Andrew Willoughby
Player of the match: Clea Smith

- Victoria won the toss and elected to bat.
- Victoria won the 2009–10 Australian Women's Twenty20 Cup.

== Statistics ==
=== Highest totals ===
| Team | Score | Against | Venue | Date |
|---|---|---|---|---|
| South Australia | 3/151 | Western Australia | St Peter's College, Adelaide | 13 November 2009 |
| Victoria | 7/146 | Queensland | Junction Oval, Melbourne | 20 November 2009 |
| Western Australia | 8/140 | Australian Capital Territory | Trinity College Oval, Perth | 11 December 2009 |
| Queensland | 6/139 | Tasmania | Allan Border Field, Brisbane | 31 October 2009 |
| New South Wales | 138 | Australian Capital Territory | Manuka Oval, Canberra | 20 November 2009 |

=== Most runs ===
| Player | Team | Mat | Inns | NO | Runs | HS | Ave | BF | SR | 100 | 50 |
|---|---|---|---|---|---|---|---|---|---|---|---|
| Leah Poulton | New South Wales | 7 | 7 | 0 | 201 | 58 | 28.71 | 162 | 124.07 | 0 | 1 |
| Elyse Villani | Victoria | 7 | 7 | 0 | 200 | 57 | 28.57 | 198 | 101.01 | 0 | 1 |
| Alex Blackwell | New South Wales | 7 | 7 | 3 | 191 | 41 | 47.75 | 157 | 121.65 | 0 | 0 |
| Julie Woerner | South Australia | 6 | 6 | 1 | 190 | 54* | 38.00 | 178 | 106.74 | 0 | 1 |
| Leonie Coleman | Australian Capital Territory | 6 | 6 | 1 | 183 | 70* | 36.60 | 151 | 121.19 | 0 | 1 |

=== Most wickets ===
| Player | Team | Mat | Inns | Overs | Runs | Wkts | BBI | Ave | Econ | SR | 4WI |
|---|---|---|---|---|---|---|---|---|---|---|---|
| Sarah Elliott | Victoria | 7 | 7 | 24.4 | 112 | 13 | 3/11 | 8.61 | 4.54 | 11.3 | 0 |
| Julie Hunter | Victoria | 7 | 7 | 23.0 | 91 | 12 | 3/5 | 7.58 | 3.95 | 11.5 | 0 |
| Kris Britt | Australian Capital Territory | 6 | 5 | 17.0 | 106 | 12 | 4/36 | 8.83 | 6.23 | 8.5 | 1 |
| Jess Moyes | Western Australia | 5 | 5 | 19.0 | 105 | 9 | 3/19 | 11.66 | 5.52 | 12.6 | 0 |
| Erin Osborne | New South Wales | 7 | 7 | 26.0 | 133 | 8 | 3/16 | 16.62 | 5.11 | 19.5 | 0 |
