= Clare Scott =

Australian cricketer

Personal information
- Full name: Clare Scott
- Born: 23 September 2001 (age 25)
- Batting: Right-handed
- Bowling: Right-arm medium
- Role: Bowler

Domestic team information
- Years: Team
- 2021/22–present: Tasmania

Career statistics
Competition	WLA
Matches	7
Runs scored	2
Batting average	–
100s/50s	0/0
Top score	1*
Balls bowled	324
Wickets	3
Bowling average	55.00
5 wickets in innings	0
10 wickets in match	0
Best bowling	2/39
Catches/stumpings	0/–
- Source: CricketArchive, 4 March 2023

Clare Scott (born 23 September 2001) is an Australian cricketer who plays as a right-arm medium bowler for Tasmania in the Women's National Cricket League (WNCL).

== Domestic career ==
Scott made her debut for Tasmania on 2 March 2022, against Victoria in the 2021–22 WNCL season. She took 2/39 in the match, dismissing both openers as her side won by 47 runs. She went on to play three more matches for the side that season, taking one further wicket. She played two matches for the side in the 2022–23 WNCL season.
