= Mia Barwick =

Australian cricketer (born 2010)

Personal information
- Born: 2010 (age 15–16)
- Batting: Right
- Bowling: Right arm Fast medium
- Role: Bowler (Note: Cricket Tasmania lists Barwick as a Batter.)
- Source: Cricinfo

Mia Barwick (born 2010) is an Australian cricketer who is a right arm fast medium bowler for Tasmania in the Women's National Cricket League. She has been described as a generational talent.

== Early life and career ==
Born in 2010, Barwick is from Mangalore, Tasmania. She grew up on a farm in York Plains, Tasmania.

== Domestic career ==
At age 9, Barwick was called up to her brother's Glenorchy Cricket Club, after it only had 9 players. Barwick made the North Hobart Cricket Club first grade team aged 12, although she wasn't allowed to play the first game she was scheduled to play because she hadn't filled out a form. In the senior one day final, Barwick took 5-41, and received player of the match honours. A year later, Barwick won another player of the match award and premiership as she hit a knock of 199 not out from 156 balls. In 2024 at age 13, she was called up to the Hobart Hurricanes T20 Spring Challenge roster as a replacement for Heather Graham. Barwick was named Tasmanian young women's player of the year in 2024-25. In 2025, she was named player of the tournament in the U-19 National Championships. She was also named Tasmanian young female player of the year at the 2025-26 state awards. Barwick was awarded a rookie contract with Tasmania for the 2026-27 season.

== International career ==
In 2026, she was selected in the Australian under 19's squad for a Tri Series tournament with England and Sri Lanka, becoming the youngest Australian under 19's cricketer.
