= Marie McDonough =

Australian cricketer

Cricket information
- Batting: Left-handed
- Bowling: Left-arm medium

International information
- National side: Australia
- Only Test (cap 50): 21 March 1958 v England

Career statistics
| Competition | WTest |
|---|---|
| Matches | 1 |
| Runs scored | – |
| Batting average | – |
| 100s/50s | – |
| Top score | – |
| Catches/stumpings | 1/– |
- Source: CricInfo, 9 March 2015

Marie McDonough (15 November 1917 – 18 October 2013) was an Australian cricketer. McDonough played one Test match for the Australia national women's cricket team, against England women at Perth in March 1958.

McDonough played six seasons for Western Australia Women's Cricket Team and was its captain in three seasons.
