= Jenny Wallace =

Australian cricketer (born 1980)

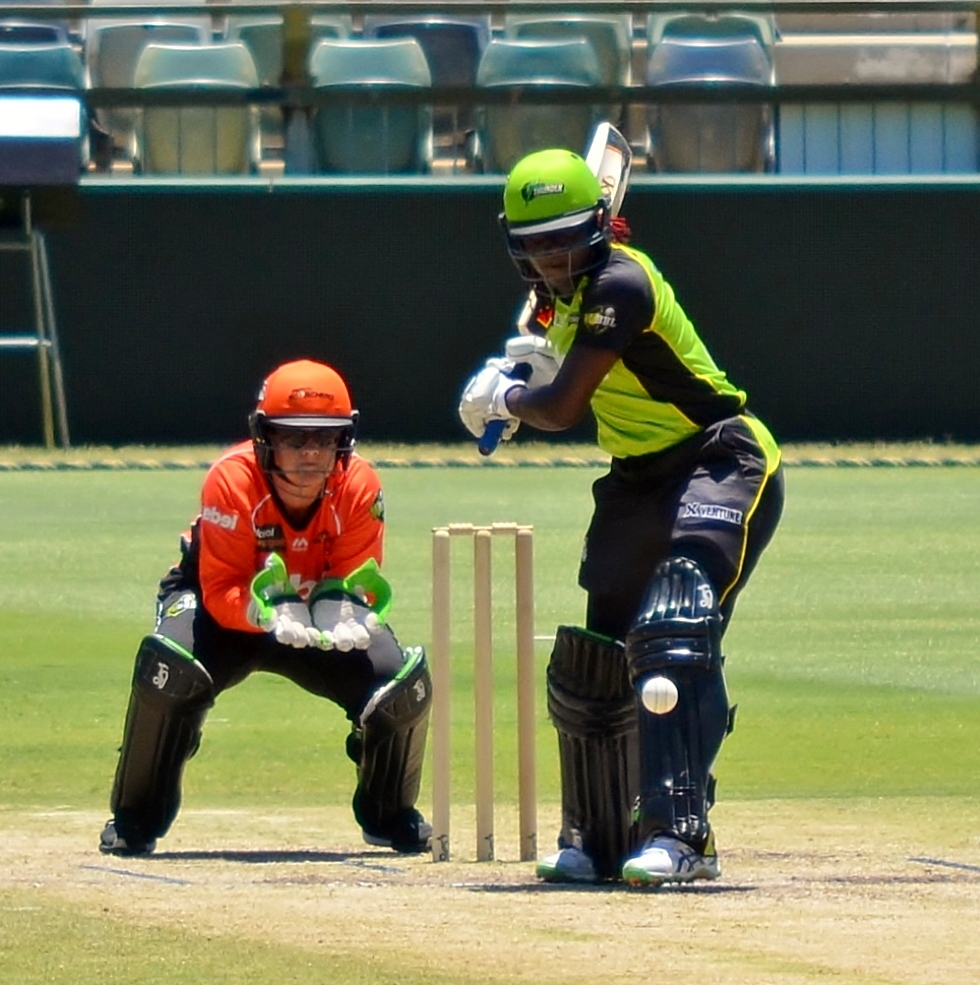
- Wallace keeps wicket for Perth Scorchers while Stafanie Taylor bats for Sydney Thunder.

Personal information
- Full name: Jennifer Clare Louise Wallace
- Born: 20 December 1980 (age 45); Sydney, Australia
- Batting: Right-handed
- Role: Wicket-keeper

Domestic team information
- Years: Team
- 2003/04–2006/07: New South Wales
- 2004: Somerset
- 2007/08–2015/16: Western Australia
- 2015/16: Perth Scorchers

Career statistics
| Competition | FC | LA | T20 |
|---|---|---|---|
| Matches | 1 | 104 | 82 |
| Runs scored | 18 | 1,948 | 1,523 |
| Batting average | – | 25.63 | 22.39 |
| 100s/50s | 0/0 | 0/9 | 0/4 |
| Top score | 18* | 96 | 56* |
| Catches/stumpings | 3/0 | 81/36 | 39/33 |
- Source: CricketArchive, 8 June 2023

Jennifer Clare Louise Wallace (born 20 December 1980) is an Australian former cricketer who played as a right-handed batter and wicket-keeper. She played domestic cricket for New South Wales, Western Australia, Perth Scorchers, and Somerset.

Wallace was born in Sydney and moved to Perth in 2007.
