= Leah Poulton =

Australian cricketer (born 1984)

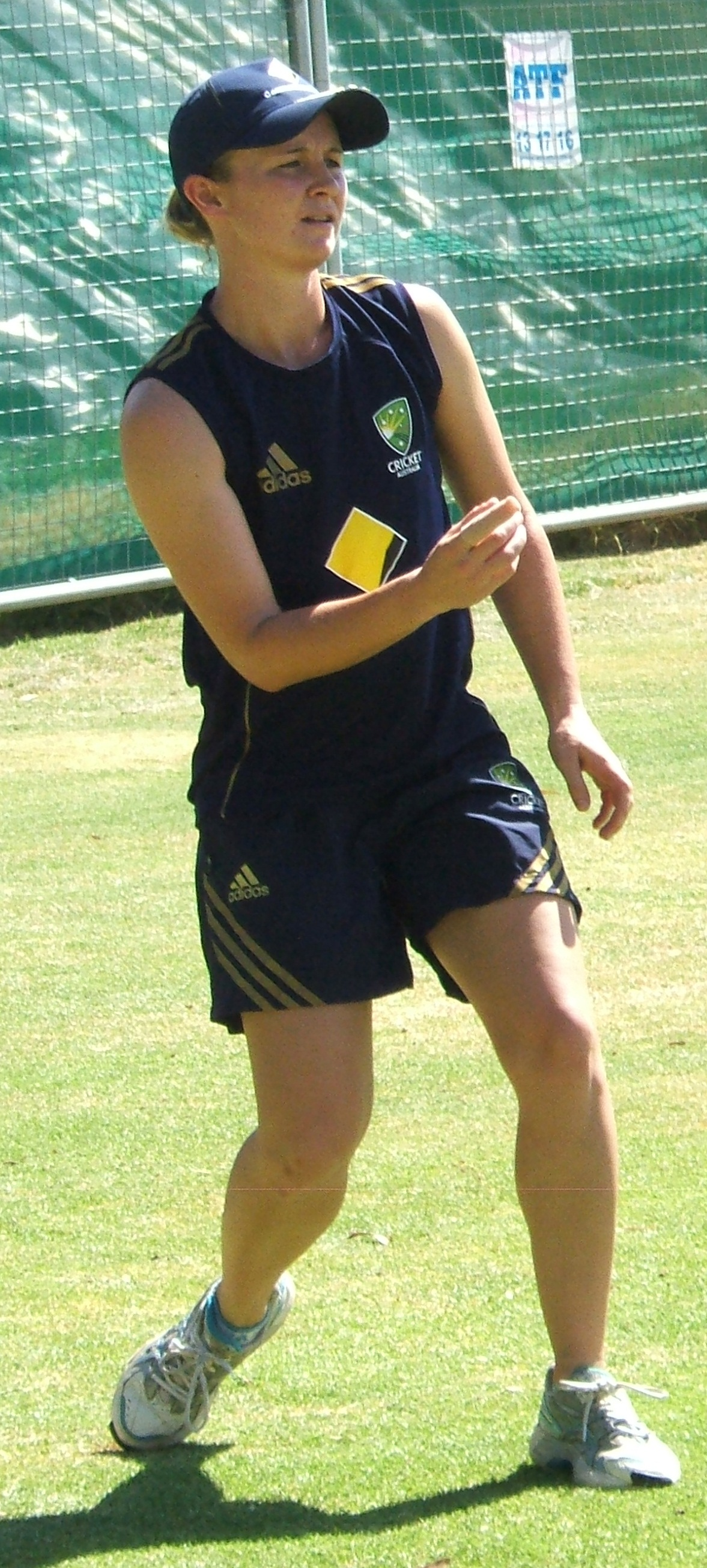
- Poulton in 2010

Personal information
- Full name: Leah Joy Poulton
- Born: 27 February 1984 (age 42); Newcastle, New South Wales, Australia
- Nickname: Poultsy, Turtle
- Batting: Right-handed
- Bowling: Right-arm leg-break
- Role: Batter
- Relatives: Rachael Haynes (wife)

International information
- National side: Australia (2006–2012)
- Test debut (cap 158): 10 July 2009 v England
- Last Test: 22 January 2011 v England
- ODI debut (cap 107): 20 October 2006 v New Zealand
- Last ODI: 19 December 2012 v New Zealand
- T20I debut (cap 15): 18 October 2006 v New Zealand
- Last T20I: 23 March 2012 v India

Domestic team information
- Years: Team
- 2002/03–2014/15: New South Wales
- 2008: Nottinghamshire

Career statistics
Competition	Test	ODI	T20I	LA
Matches	2	48	40	172
Runs scored	45	1,033	784	4,394
Batting average	15.00	25.19	20.63	29.09
100s/50s	0/0	2/4	0/0	3/28
Top score	23	104*	61	109
Balls bowled	24	144	18	660
Wickets	0	3	2	11
Bowling average	–	32.66	10.00	40.45
5 wickets in innings	–	0	0	0
10 wickets in match	–	0	0	0
Best bowling	–	2/9	2/20	3/10
Catches/stumpings	1/–	12/–	7/–	35/–
- Source: CricketArchive, 22 October 2021

Leah Joy Poulton (born 27 February 1984) is an Australian former cricketer who played for New South Wales and Australia. She played as a specialist batter who usually opened the batting.

Poulton came to prominence in youth cricket by captaining New South Wales to the Under-17 national championships in 2000. In 2002–03, she made her senior debut for New South Wales in the Women's National Cricket League (WNCL). She found runs hard to come by in her first three seasons and was in and out of the team frequently, aggregating only 24 runs in her second and third seasons combined. Despite this, she regularly captained Australia's Under-19 and Under-23 teams during this time, leading the latter on a successful tour of Sri Lanka in 2004. In 2005–06, she made a substantial impact on the WNCL for the first time, scoring 325 runs, more than twice her previous best season's total, playing in the first of five consecutive WNCL triumphs for New South Wales.

Poulton was rewarded with international selection in the Rose Bowl series against New Zealand at the start of the 2006–07 season and scored her maiden century, 101, in the third match. However, after a poor tour of India at the end of the season, she was dropped from the Australian team in mid-2007 and continued to be overlooked after a poor WNCL season in 2007–08. During the 2008 Australian winter, she travelled to play for Nottinghamshire in England, and earned herself a recall to the Australian team at the start of the 2008–09 southern hemisphere season. After scoring 376 runs at a batting average of 41.77 in the 2008–09 WNCL, Poulton retained her position in the national team for the 2009 Women's Cricket World Cup and the 2009 World Twenty20. She was a regular member of the playing team in both tournaments, participating all the matches in the latter. In 2009, Poulton made her Test debut against England and in 2009–10, she hit her second One Day International (ODI) century, 104 not out against New Zealand.

Poulton announced her ODI retirement in December 2012, and announced retirement from all forms from the game in March 2015. While announcing her ODI retirement, she said that it was the Twenty20 format that strengthened her love for cricket, and if not for T20s, she would have retired sooner.

== Youth cricket ==
Poulton is from Elermore Vale in the New South Wales coastal city of Newcastle, and played for the Wallsend Cricket Club in the city. She grew up in Newcastle, before moving to Sydney. She attended Lambton High School. Outside of cricket, she works as a physical education teacher.

In March 2000, soon after turning 16, she played for New South Wales in the national Under-17 championships. She scored 141 runs at a batting average of 23.50 and took two wickets at a bowling average of 15.50 as New South Wales defeated Victoria Blue to win the competition. In January 2002, she was selected for the state Under-19 team and scored 112 in the first match, against the Australian Capital Territory. She also made two ducks and ended the tournament with 188 runs at 31.33; New South Wales won all of their six matches.

== Senior domestic debut ==
At the start of the 2002–03 season, Poulton made her senior debut for New South Wales in the Women's National Cricket League in a double-header against South Australia. In her first match, she scored 12 in a five-wicket victory. Playing in ten matches, she made many starts, reaching double figures in all but one of her nine innings, but managed only a best score of 36 run out, against Western Australia. She ended the WNCL season with 159 runs at 19.87 as New South Wales came second, ending a run of six consecutive titles. Victoria qualified first and thus hosted the finals, defeating New South Wales 2–0 in a best-of-three series. Poulton made only 1 and 11 in the deciding matches, which were lost by 3 wickets and 40 runs respectively.

During the season, Poulton also played in the Under-19 interstate tournament during the break in the WNCL, captaining her state. In five innings, she made three half-centuries, with a best of 73 against Queensland in the final, which New South Wales won by five wickets. She was unbeaten in the other two fifties after opening the batting; New South Wales completed ten-wicket wins in both instances. Poulton ended the competition with 191 runs at 63.66. She was rewarded with selection in and captaincy of the national Under-19 team during the season and played in two matches against England Under-19s, scoring 13 and 35 as Australia won both matches. At the end of the season, she was selected to lead an Australian Under-23 team to play against the senior England team. Poulton made 15 in her only innings.

Poulton had an interrupted season in 2003–04. After playing in the first two matches against Western Australia, scoring only 3 not out and 1 as New South Wales took both matches, she was absent until the finals series. Victoria had qualified first and hosted the three-match series. Poulton was omitted for the first match, which was won by the home team, before being recalled for the second match. She made 1 and 11 as New South Wales won the last two fixtures by five and three wickets respectively to claim the title. However, Poulton contributed little to the team's triumph, managing only 16 runs at 5.33. At the end of the season she was appointed captain of the Australian Youth team and played in four matches against New Zealand A, scoring 127 runs at 31.75 with a best of 75 in the second of these fixtures. Sarah Tsukigawa had success against Poulton, dismissing her three times in a row. Australia won all but the last match.

Poulton was then made captain of the Australian Under-23 team for a tour of Sri Lanka in September 2004. The tourists played four one-dayers against the host nation's senior team and won all but the abandoned third match. In the second match, Poulton scored 14 and took her first wicket against senior opposition after bowling for the first time at the level. She made her top-score of the series with 48 in the third fixture, and made 33 and took 2/10 in the fourth match. Poulton then made her debut in non-one-day cricket against the Sri Lankans, scoring 10 before being run out. After Australia took a 102-run lead, she top-scored with 40 before declaring at 8/150 and leading the team to a 140-run win. She took a total of 0/24 from 10 overs.

After playing in the first four matches of the 2004–05 WNCL season, Poulton missed three matches in a row before playing her final match of the season against Queensland and being dropped for the three finals matches against Victoria. New South Wales lost the finals 2–1 after finishing the regular season first and earning the right to host the series. Poulton batted only three times and accumulated eight runs at 4.00 but New South Wales nevertheless won all of these five matches.

Poulton returned to form in the 2005–06 WNCL season, playing in all of New South Wales' 11 matches. After being run out for 39 in the first match against Western Australia, she made consecutive half-centuries against Western Australia and Queensland. New South Wales won seven of their eight round-robin matches to qualify to host the three-match finals series against Queensland. Up to this point, Poulton had only scored 24 runs at 6.00 in four WNCL finals matches and had been dropped ahead of the deciding series the previous season. In the first match at North Sydney Oval, Poulton top-scored with an unbeaten 70 to guide New South Wales to their target of 175 for an eight-wicket win. She made 28 of her state's 154 as Queensland took the series to a deciding match with a three-wicket win in the second match. Poulton was dismissed for five in the deciding match as New South Wales were bowled out for 146, before dismissing the visitors for 144 to claim a two-run win and the WNCL. She ended the season with 325 runs at 32.50 as New South Wales won 9 of their 11 matches to claim the title. Poulton bowled for the first time in the WNCL, conceding 18 runs from two overs.

Poulton won the Belinda Clark Medal four times, for the best performance for New South Wales in a season. She was the first player to score 1,500 runs in Australian Women's Twenty20 Cup, and the only player to score a century for New South Wales in Women's Twenty20 cricket.

== International debut ==
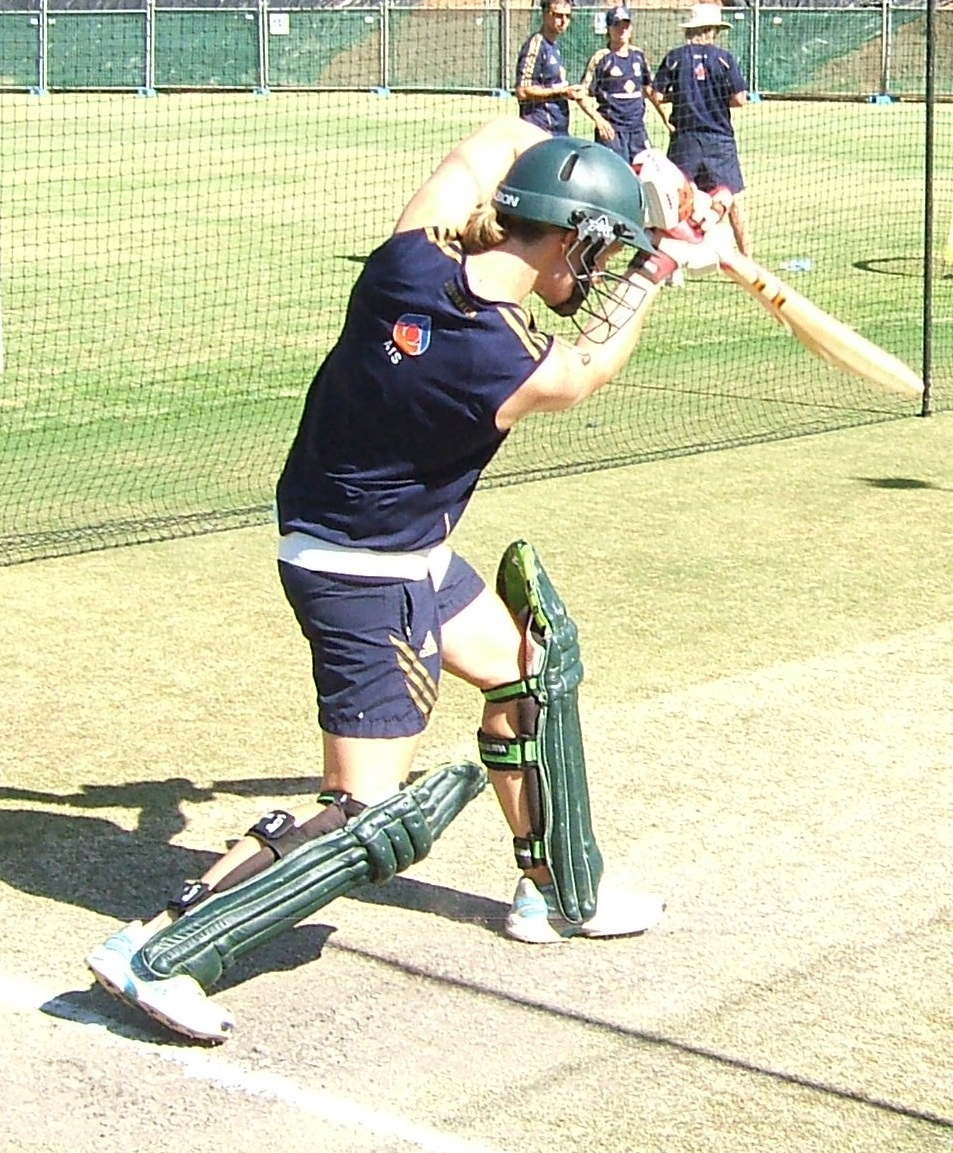
Leah Poulton follows through after playing a drive.

These performances were not enough to gain selection in the Test and one-day series against India held in Adelaide immediately after the WNCL. However, Poulton was called up for her senior international debut against New Zealand in the Rose Bowl series staged at Allan Border Field in Brisbane at the start of the 2006–07 season because of an injury to fellow New South Wales batsman Alex Blackwell. The chairman of selectors Margaret Jennings said "She is a talented player with a free-flowing game, and we are keen to see how she performs against New Zealand, whom we expect to provide some very tough competition." Poulton played in all of the matches. She made 10 in her Twenty20 international debut and the match ended in a tie.

In her One Day International (ODI) debut, Poulton opened the batting with Melissa Bulow and occupied the crease for nine balls before being trapped leg before wicket by Sarah Burke for a duck. This left Australia at 1/0 with after 21 balls; the hosts eventually scraped home for a one-run victory. Poulton said that she was "way too nervous" during her maiden innings. She scored her first ODI runs in the following match, making 16 from 25 balls with 4 fours as the hosts won by a single wicket with a ball to spare. In the third match, Poulton scored her maiden ODI century, 101 from 136 balls, including seven fours and a six. Australia went on to seal the series with a five-run win. She then made 68 from 76 balls—including ten fours—in the next match before being run out, laying the foundation for Australia's 9/252 and an 85-run win. Poulton made only 12 in the final match as the hosts completed a clean sweep of the ODIs with a four-wicket win. In her debut series, she aggregated 197 runs at 39.60 with a strike rate of 70.86. Poulton is the 107th woman to play One Day International cricket for Australia.

During the 2006–07 season, Poulton played in all 11 of New South Wales' WNCL matches, scoring 227 runs at 20.63. New South Wales struggled in the first four round-robin matches, losing three. In the fifth match, against Western Australia, Poulton scored 64 to set up a six-wicket victory. New South Wales won their last four matches to qualify in second place for the final, which was hosted by Victoria. Poulton scored 17 and 39 in the first two matches, both times being run out. New South Wales scraped home by one wicket in the first match, but the hosts levelled the series with an eight-wicket win the next day. In the third game, she made only nine, but New South Wales eventually reached the target of 206 with three wickets in hand to take the finals 2–1. Poulton took her first WNCL wicket in the season, bowling a full quota of ten overs against Western Australia, taking 1/23. Her maiden wicket was Avril Fahey, trapped leg before wicket. She ended the season with one wicket at 63.00 at an economy rate of 3.50.

After the end of the Australian season, Poulton was selected for the ODI team the ICC Women's Quadrangular Series in Chennai, India. In addition to the hosts and Australia, New Zealand and England were also participating, and each team played each other twice in the round-robin phase. Poulton scored only 8 and 0 from 21 and 8 balls respectively as Australia lost their first two matches against New Zealand and India respectively. She was then dropped for the next two games. She was recalled for the penultimate round-robin match against England but did not bat in a six-wicket win, and then made 27 as Australia defeated India by four wickets in the last match. The Australians needed 231 for victory—4.62 runs per over—and Poulton got their innings off to a slow start, taking 75 balls to accumulate her runs, scoring at less than half of the required rate. However, her teammates sped up and reached the target from the last ball of the match to qualify for the final against New Zealand. Australia won by six wickets with the dropped Poulton watching from the sidelines. She ended the series with 35 runs at 11.66 with a strike rate of only 33.65, was then overlooked for the Rose Bowl series against New Zealand held in Darwin in July.

== International omission and recall ==
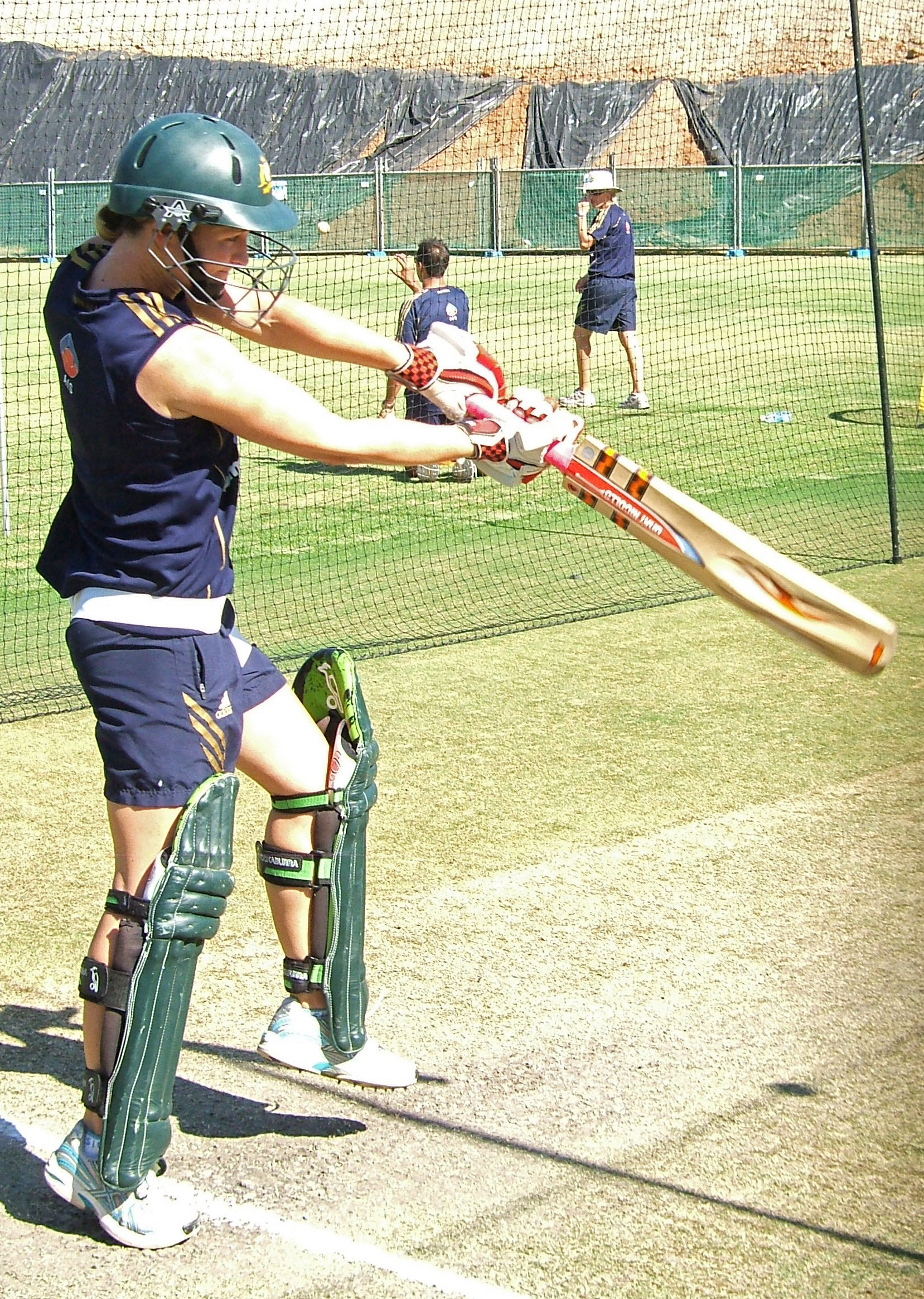
Poulton playing a cut shot in the nets.

Poulton struggled in the eight WNCL matches during the 2007–08 season, scoring 106 runs at 13.25 with a best of 39 against Western Australia. She took her best bowling figures at senior level, claiming 3/10 in the second match against Western Australia. Poulton captured three lower-order wickets in quick succession as Western Australia lost 4/10 to be all out for 141. However, Poulton was then bowled for a golden duck from the first ball of the innings from Lauren Ebsary as New South Wales lost the match by 37 runs. Poulton ended the season with four wickets at 8.75 at an economy rate of 3.75. New South Wales reached the final and were awarded the title because they placed first in the qualifying matches after rain washed out the deciding game without a ball being bowled. She also played in two Twenty20 interstate matches, top-scoring with 69 in the first match against South Australia, before making 35 against Western Australia; New South Wales won both games. After her poor WNCL season, Poulton was overlooked for Australian selection for the home series against England and then the Rose Bowl tour of New Zealand that followed.

During the Australian winter of 2008, Poulton travelled to England and played for Nottinghamshire in the Women's County Championship. After making a duck on debut for the county, she made 68 in the next match against Sussex and ended her stay with 150 runs at 25.00 from six matches. She bowled 20.4 overs for the county, taking a total of 0/95. She was in better form for the Sapphires in the Super Fours, scoring three half-centuries in four innings and ending with 215 runs at 53.75 in four List A matches. She also top-scored in both T20 matches for the Sapphires, making 32 and 47. She also took 2/23 in the latter match, dismissing Jenny Gunn and Laura Marsh.

These performances earned Poulton a recall for the five-match home ODI series against India ahead of the 2008–09 Australian season, which the hosts swept easily; the margins of victory in each match were at least 54 runs or seven wickets. After making a duck in the T20 international that preceded the ODIs, Poulton played in the first four ODIs. She scored 79 runs at 26.33 but scored at the slow strike rate of 47.87. This resulted in her being dropped down the order from an opening position for the fourth match; her teammates reached the victory target before she was required and she was then omitted for the final match. Poulton took her maiden international wicket in the fourth match at Manuka Oval in Canberra, trapping Indian wicket-keeper Anagha Deshpande lbw. She ended the series with a total of 1/63.

Poulton had her most productive season in the WNCL in 2008–09 ahead of the 2009 World Cup, scoring 376 runs at 41.77. She posted two half-centuries in the first four matches, resulting in eight-wicket wins over Queensland and Western Australia respectively. She then made fifties in each of the last three round-robin matches. This included 60 and 53 against Victoria in the last two games, which New South Wales won win by nine and three wickets respectively. New South Wales thus earned the right to host the final against the same team, and Poulton made 43 as they chased down 118 and won the title by six wickets. Poulton totalled 0/48 from 11 overs during the WNCL. She also played in two Twenty20 interstate matches, scoring 23 and 35. New South Wales won the first before losing by one wicket to Victoria in the second.

== World Cup ==
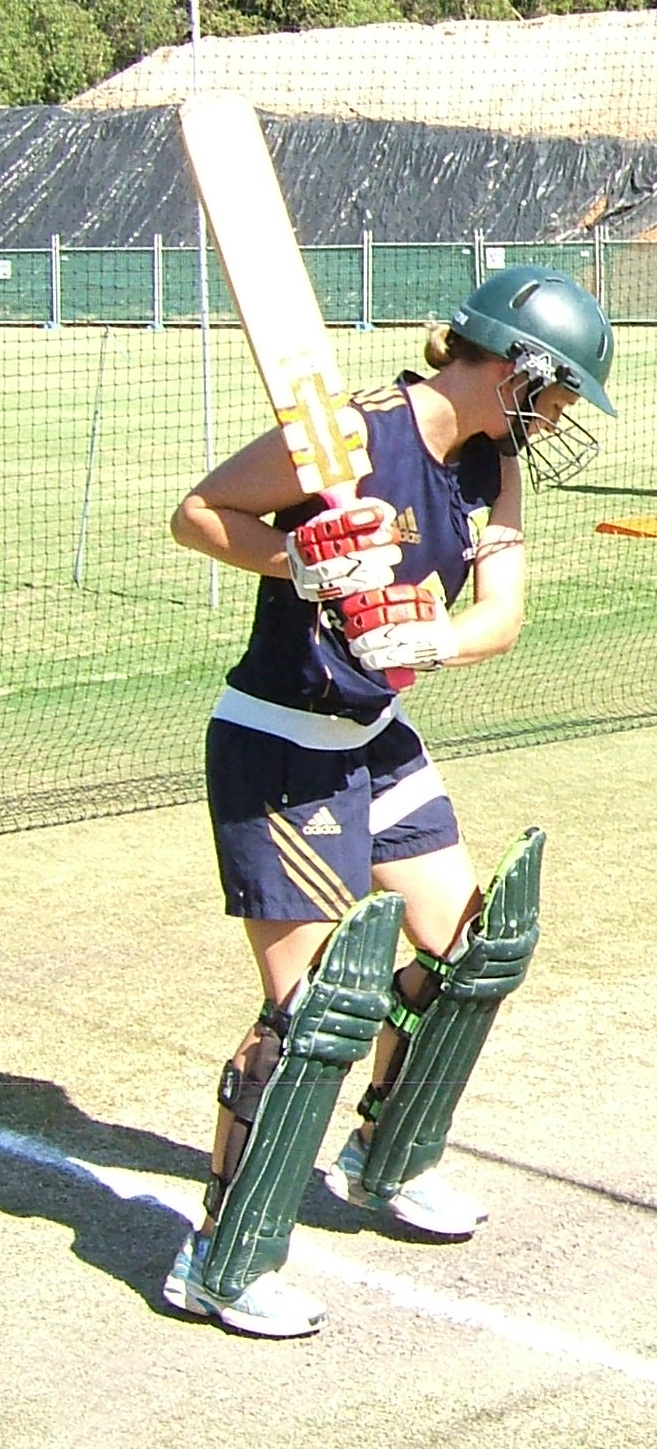
Poulton preparing to play a shot in the nets.

Australia toured New Zealand before the World Cup, and Poulton was dropped into the middle-order. She made four in the first two matches, both of which the hosts won. She struggled in these matches, taking 15 and 18 balls to score the four runs in either ODI, was omitted for the third match. She then returned to her customary opening position and scored 81 from 97 balls, including 11 fours, in the fourth match, helping to set up an Australia victory by 44 runs. The fifth match of the series was abandoned.

In two warm-up matches ahead of the World Cup in Australia, Poulton made 24 and 49 against England and Sri Lanka. Nevertheless, she was left out of the team for the opening match against New Zealand, which Australia lost. Poulton was recalled for the two remaining group matches against South Africa and the West Indies. The hosts won both matches to reach the next round, but Poulton struggled. Playing out of position in the middle-order, she made nine from 21 balls against South Africa in her home town of Newcastle; restored to the top of the order, she made a duck against the West Indies. Poulton was then dropped for Australia's first match of the next phase against India, which they lost. She was recalled for the next match and scored 47 against Pakistan, putting on 100 for the first wicket with Shelley Nitschke before the latter was bowled. Poulton was then bowled herself, the third time in as many ODIs that she had been dismissed in such a manner. Australia reached 6/229 in their 50 overs, and Poulton then took 2/9, claiming the lower-order wickets of Javeria Khan and Qanita Jalil as the hosts won by 107 runs. She then hit 38 from 47 balls, including a six, in the final Super Six match against England. This helped set up Australia's successful run-chase but it was not enough to rank them among the top two nations and qualify them for the final. They faced India in the playoff for third place and Poulton was bowled by Jhulan Goswami for a duck. The hosts were all out for 142 and India reached the target with three wickets in hand. Poulton ended her campaign with 94 runs at 18.80 and took a total of 2/17 from five overs.

Poulton was selected for the 2009 World Twenty20 in England and Australia hosted New Zealand for three T20 matches in tropical Brisbane during the southern hemisphere winter before the teams departed for the tournament. Poulton scored 4, 33 and 30 as Australia took the series 2–1. Once the Australians were in England, Poulton top-scored with 66 and took 1/7 against the hosts in her only innings in the pre-tournament practice matches. Poulton made only two and eight in Australia's first two pool matches against New Zealand and the West Indies; Australia lost the first by nine wickets and won the second by eight wickets. In the final pool match, against South Africa, Australia needed a victory to progress. Batting first, she scored 22 before being run out as Australia made 6/164 from their 20 overs. In reply, South Africa were on track to reach the target, having reached 0/73 after seven overs. Poulton trapped Shandre Fritz for 39 with the first ball of the next over, and the South Africans lost momentum, scoring only 41 runs for the loss of seven wickets in the next ten overs. On the last ball of the 17th over, Poulton trapped opposition captain Sunette Loubser and ended with 2/20 from three overs as Australia prevailed by 24 runs to reach the semi-finals, where they faced England. Poulton scored 39 to push Australia to 5/163 but the hosts reached the target with eight wickets in hand and progressed to the final, which they won.

== Test debut ==
Australia stayed in England for a bilateral series against the hosts—the reigning world champions in both ODIs and T20s—after the end of the World Twenty20. Poulton scored 33 and took two catches as Australia upset England in the only T20 by 34 runs. She played in all of the five ODIs, but was not successful, being dismissed for single-digit scores every time and ending with 26 runs at 5.20. She struggled to make an effective start in the matches, with a strike rate of 35.00 or less in each of her five innings and 29.54 overall. England won all the matches except the last, which was ended by persistent rain. Poulton made her Test debut against England in a one-off match at New Road in Worcester. Australia batted first and Poulton came in at No. 6. She lasted only 14 balls before being bowled by paceman Katherine Brunt for 1. This was part of a batting collapse that left the tourists at 5/28, but they recovered to reach 309. Poulton then bowled four overs in the first innings, taking 0/15. She took her first catch in Tests, removing Claire Taylor from the bowling of Lauren Ebsary. Australia took a 41-run lead and Poulton then scored 23 from 41 balls before being run out as the match ended in a draw. Poulton is the 158th woman to play Test cricket for Australia.

Poulton had a modest WNCL in 2009–10, scoring 215 runs at 21.50. She reached double figures in nine of 11 innings, but was unable to convert the starts into large scores. Her highest score for the season was 42 against the Australian Capital Territory. She made 31, her second best effort of the competition, in the final, as New South Wales defeated Victoria by 59 runs to take their fifth WNCL title in a row. She had more success in the new T20 domestic competition, scoring 201 runs at 28.71. She top-scored with 58 in a seven-run defeat at the hands of Victoria and then made 38 in a nine-wicket win over South Australia. However, she made only six in the final as Victoria dismissed New South Wales for 75 to win by 52 runs.

After the domestic competition ended, Poulton played in the Rose Bowl series against New Zealand. She was omitted from the first two ODIs at the Adelaide Oval before being recalled for the last three matches held at the Junction Oval in Melbourne; Rachael Haynes was moved from an opening position into the middle-order to make way for Poulton. After making a duck in her first innings back, Poulton struck an unbeaten 104 from 116 balls in the fourth match, hitting nine fours and three sixes, putting on an unbroken opening stand of 163 with Shelley Nitschke as the Australians won by ten wickets. She made seven in the final match as the Australians completed a 5–0 sweep of the home ODI leg of the series. Poulton had little success in the T20s in Australia, scoring 0, 24 and 1 as the tourists bounced back to claim a whitewash. She then scored only one in the first T20 during the New Zealand leg of the tour and was left out for the second match, which the hosts won to sweep the T20s. Poulton played in all three ODIs in New Zealand, scoring 7, 47 and 31 as the Australians again swept the 50-over matches. In the second match at Invercargill, she struck seven boundaries in her 54-ball innings to help Australia make a rapid start to their chase of 256. In the final match, Australia faced a target of only 174 and Poulton hit 28 of her 31 runs from fours in a 16-ball innings, scoring almost two runs per ball. Australia won both of the last two matches by six wickets.

== 2010 World Twenty20 triumph ==
Poulton was selected for the 2010 World Twenty20 in the West Indies and played in every match. With the selection of Elyse Villani to open with Nitschke, Poulton batted at No. 3 in all but one match. In the first warm-up match, she scored one from six balls before being dismissed by Sian Ruck as Australia lost to New Zealand by 18 runs. In the last warm-up match, she hammered 44 from 21 balls including two sixes and then took a catch to remove Armaan Khan as Australians made 5/166 and defeated Pakistan by 82 runs.

Australia were grouped with England, South Africa and the West Indies. In the first match against England, Poulton ran out Laura Marsh, triggering the loss of the last four wickets without the addition of a run, in six balls, leaving 15 deliveries unused. In pursuit of 105 for victory, Poulton top-scored for Australia with 23 from 28 balls, helping to stabilise the innings after the Australians had fallen to 2/10. However, she fell at 4/45, bowled by Holly Colvin, and eventually, Rene Farrell was run out going for the winning run from the third last ball available, leaving the scores tied.

A Super Over eventuated, and Marsh bowled for England. Farrell and Poulton batted for Australia. Poulton scored a single off the first ball she faced, before being caught by Colvin on the fourth ball. This left Australia at 1/4 and they ended at 2/6. England also ended with 2/6 after a run out in an attempt to secure the winning run on the final ball. Australia was awarded the match because they had hit more sixes in the match—Jess Cameron scored the solitary six.

In the next match against South Africa, Poulton came in at 1/9 after the fall of Villani at the end of the first over. She counter-attacked with Nitschke, scoring 39 runs herself from only 25 balls, including two sixes. The pair put on 58 from only 37 balls before Poulton was caught from the first ball of the eighth over. Australia collapsed and lost 6/16 including the last four wickets for four runs to be all out for 155 with three balls unused, before completing a 22-run win. In the final group match against the West Indies, Poulton came in at 1/33 and hit 15 from 13 balls, including three fours. Australia finished on 7/133 and won by nine runs to finish the group stage unbeaten at the top of their quartet.

Australia went on to face India in the semi-final. Chasing a target of 120, Poulton came in to join captain Blackwell—who had promoted herself up the order—at 2/75, with 45 runs needed from 56 balls. Poulton hit 30 from 26 balls to seal an Australian victory with seven wickets and seven balls to spare. She brought up the winning runs with a lofted drive that bounced once before going for four runs. In the final against New Zealand, Australia started poorly after electing to bat. Nitschke fell in the third over to bring Poulton in at 1/10, before Villani and Blackwell fell quickly to leave Australia at 3/20 in the sixth over. This was followed by a consolidating partnership of 30 between Poulton and Cameron, but they were unable to lift the run rate substantially; their stand took 45 balls. Poulton was caught trying to loft a ball over cover, and two balls later, Cameron was bowled, leaving Australia at 5/51 in the 13th over. Only Poulton managed a solitary boundary. A later burst took Australia to 8/106 from their 20 overs and Poulton ended with the highest score of 20 from 28 balls. The Australians then restricted New Zealand to 6/103 to complete a three-run win. Poulton was Australian's highest run-scorer for the tournament and the third among all players.

== One Day International centuries ==
Runs	Match	Opponents	City	Venue	Year
101	3	New Zealand	Brisbane, Australia	Allan Border Field	2006
104*	28	New Zealand	Melbourne, Australia	Junction Oval	2010

- Source: CricInfo

== Post-retirement ==
Poulton was the assistant coach of Sydney Thunder when they won their maiden title in 2015-16 season. She continued to be involve with New South Wales after her retirement as the Female Pathway Breaker and then the assistant coach of New South Wales women's team. She later moved to the Cricket Australia's high-performance centre and coached the women's teams of Australia A, Australia Under-19s and Australia Under-15s. She oversaw for introduction of the Under-19 and A team programmes, and the first overseas tour of both the teams. In March 2020, Poulton was named as the head coach of Melbourne Stars in Women's Big Bash League. Less than a month later, she resigned from the job and was appointed as the head of female cricket at Cricket NSW.

== Personal life ==
Poulton's partner is current Australia cricketer Rachael Haynes. Poulton gave birth to their first child, Hugo Poulton-Haynes, in October 2021.

== See also ==
- List of centuries in women's One Day International cricket
