= Lauren Ebsary =

Australian cricketer (born 1983)

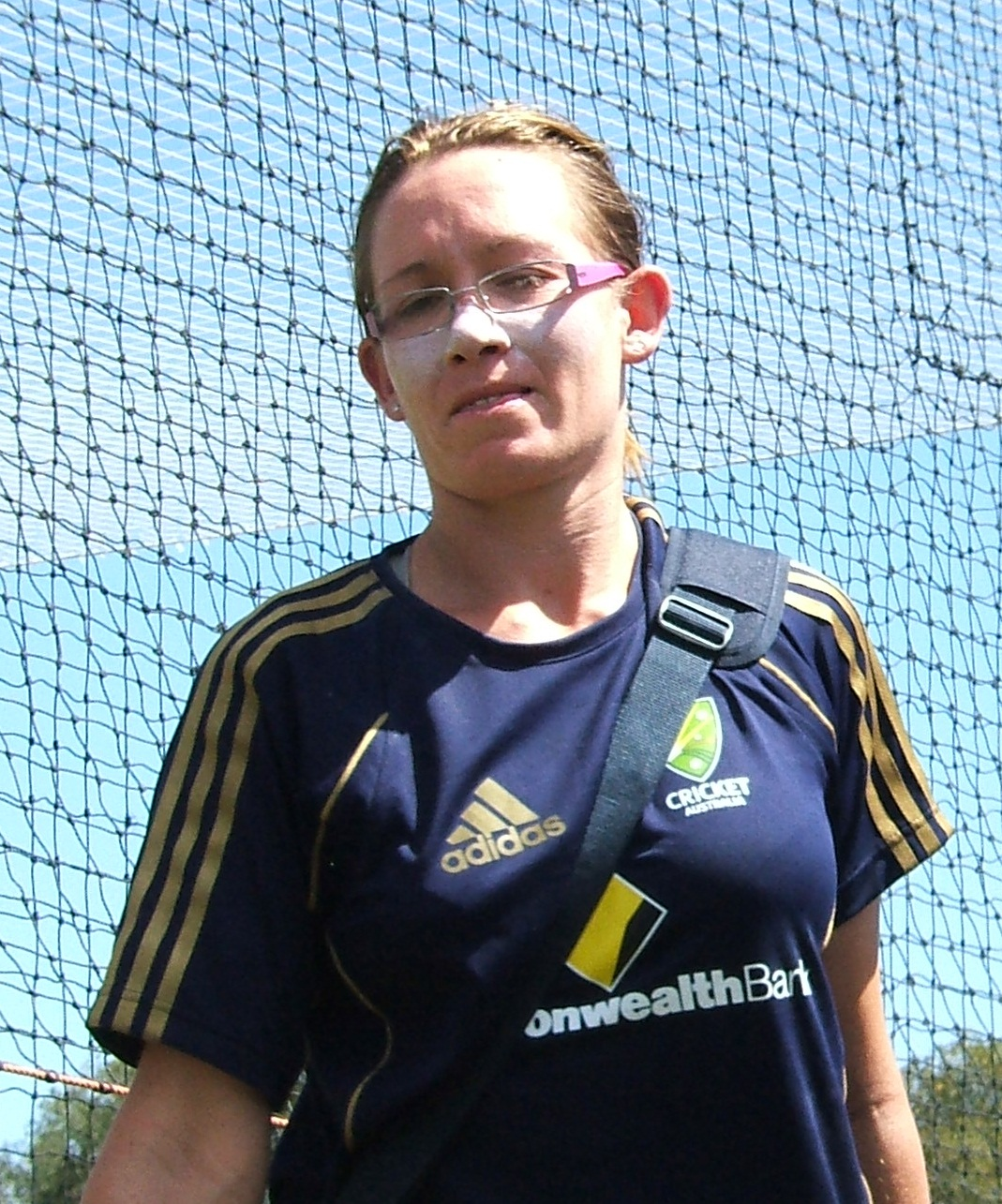

Personal information
- Full name: Lauren Kaye Ebsary
- Born: 15 March 1983 (age 43); Snowtown, South Australia
- Nickname: Beep
- Batting: Right-handed
- Bowling: Right-arm medium

International information
- National side: Australia
- Only Test (cap 155): 10 July 2009 v England
- ODI debut (cap 112): 1 November 2008 v India
- Last ODI: 17 February 2010 v New Zealand
- T20I debut (cap 24): 15 February 2009 v New Zealand
- Last T20I: 29 September 2012 v Pakistan

Domestic team information
- Years: Team
- 2007–: Western Fury
- 2000–2007: South Australian Scorpions

Career statistics
Competition	Test	ODI	T20I
Matches	1	19	14
Runs scored	24	402	113
Batting average	12.00	28.71	14.12
100s/50s	0/0	0/2	0/0
Top score	21	86	24*
Balls bowled	96	126	–
Wickets	2	3	–
Bowling average	21.50	28.33	–
5 wickets in innings	0	0	–
10 wickets in match	0	0	–
Best bowling	2/35	1/13	–
Catches/stumpings	0/–	6/–	4/–
- Source: CricketArchive, 15 April 2010

Lauren Kaye Ebsary (born 15 March 1983) is an Australian cricketer. Primarily a batter, she is a former member of the Australia national women's cricket team.

Ebsary made her senior debut for South Australia in the Women's National Cricket League (WNCL) during the 2000–01 season at the age of 18. Although she played in every match in her first season, she was shielded from much of the action and made only six runs. Ebsary was selected in every match in her first three seasons, but in that time, scored only 136 runs at a batting average of 8.50 and took 13 wickets from 24 matches. The following year, Ebsary raised her career average above 10 for the first time and was selected in the Australian Under-23 team. In 2004–05 she made more than 100 runs in a season for the first time, and the following year she made 149 runs at 29.80. In 2006–07, she struggled and totalled only 101 runs at 14.42 and took three wickets, and after the season she transferred to Western Australia. The change of state yielded dividends in the 2007–08 season, as she made 236 runs and took eight wickets, her highest aggregate of runs and wickets in one tournament.

At the start of the 2008–09 season, Ebsary gained selection to the Australian national team and made her One Day International (ODI) debut in the home series against India. She made 37 runs at 18.50, and after scoring 207 runs in the WNCL season, was retained in the national team. After making her ODI top-score of 86 in the Rose Bowl series against New Zealand, she was selected for the 2009 World Cup, but was in and out of the team, making 106 runs at 35.33. In June 2009, she played in all of Australia's matches at the 2009 World Twenty20 and made her Test debut against England in a bilateral series after the World Twenty20. Ebsary scored 211 runs during the 2009–10 WNCL season to retain her position in the national squad for the Rose Bowl series, but after a series of poor performances, she spent the latter half of the campaign watching from the sidelines.

== Early years ==
Born in Snowtown, South Australia, Lauren Ebsary was one of four children—two boys and two girls—of Peter and Kaye Ebsary. While pursuing her secondary education at Snowtown Area School, attended a cricket coaching clinic organised by her school in 1996. It was there that her talent was noticed by Australian Test player and development officer for the South Australian Cricket Association (SACA) Joanne Broadbent, who said that Ebsary "had a lot of potential from the start". After Ebsary made her debut for Australia, Broadbent said "I’ve always believed Lauren had the capacity to represent her country." Ebsary was initially a tall and gangly pace bowler who mixed testing deliveries with erratic ones, including many wides.

During her teenage years before she acquired a driver's licence, Ebsary's mother drove her to the state capital, Adelaide—more than 100 km away—to play for the Flinders University Cricket Club in SACA's district women's competition on weekends. Back in Snowtown, she practised against her father and one of her brothers.

== Cricket career ==
=== Junior selection ===
In 1997–98 she attended the state under-17s trials and was successful in gaining selection at the age of 14. Due to the lack of opportunities to females to play cricket at local youth level, she played her first competitive game at the national championships in Brisbane. In January 2000, at the age of 16, Ebsary was chosen for the South Australian team for the Under-19 interstate championships. Playing as a specialist batsman—she bowled a solitary wicketless over in six matches—she failed to pass five with the bat in her first five matches, before scoring an unbeaten 34 in the final match against Tasmania. Nevertheless, it was not a successful tournament, yielding 45 runs at a batting average of 9.00.

=== Senior debut ===
Despite the lack of success at youth interstate level, Ebsary was promoted into the senior South Australian team in the 2000–01 season at the age of 17, playing in all of her state's eight matches in the Women's National Cricket League (WNCL). She made her debut against reigning champions New South Wales, and after not batting, took one wicket for the loss of six runs (1/6) from two overs as South Australia lost by seven wickets. In the next match of the double-header the next day, she took 0/15 from two overs and was run out for a duck in her maiden senior innings in a 22-run loss. During the season, Ebsary often batted at the bottom of the order in a specialist bowler's position and thus rarely batted, but she hardly bowled, delivering only six overs in total in her first seven matches. In effect, she was shielded from taking on a meaningful workload and not trusted to contribute with either bat or ball. In the last match of the season, she was finally given a substantial opportunity against Queensland, taking 3/21 from seven overs, as South Australia proceeded to a six-wicket victory. Nevertheless, in eight matches she scored only six runs at 2.00 in three innings, and took five wickets at a bowling average of 9.40 and an economy rate of 3.61. South Australia won only three matches and did not make the finals.

During the 2001–02 WNCL, Ebsary played in all eight matches, and was given more responsibility. This season, she batted in seven innings and bowled 51 of a maximum possible 80 overs. In the first match of the season, she took 3/29 from 10 overs against the titleholders New South Wales, and she scored 51 in the fifth match against Victoria. Ebsary did not have a significant impact in the other matches, never taking more than one wicket per match or reaching double figures with the bat. She ended the season with 67 runs at 9.57 and six wickets at 30.83 at an economy rate of 3.62. South Australia won four of their eight matches and did not make the final.

Ebsary was 18 during the season and still eligible for the Under-19s and she represented her state during the tournament, which was held in the middle of a break in the WNCL. She scored 119 runs at 19.83 and took nine wickets at 15.55 with a best of 4/27 against the Australian Capital Territory. At the end of the season, Ebsary was chosen in the Australia Youth team to play New Zealand A and New Zealand. In four matches she took two wickets at 32.00 at an economy rate of 2.66 but had no impact with the bat, scoring five runs at 1.66.

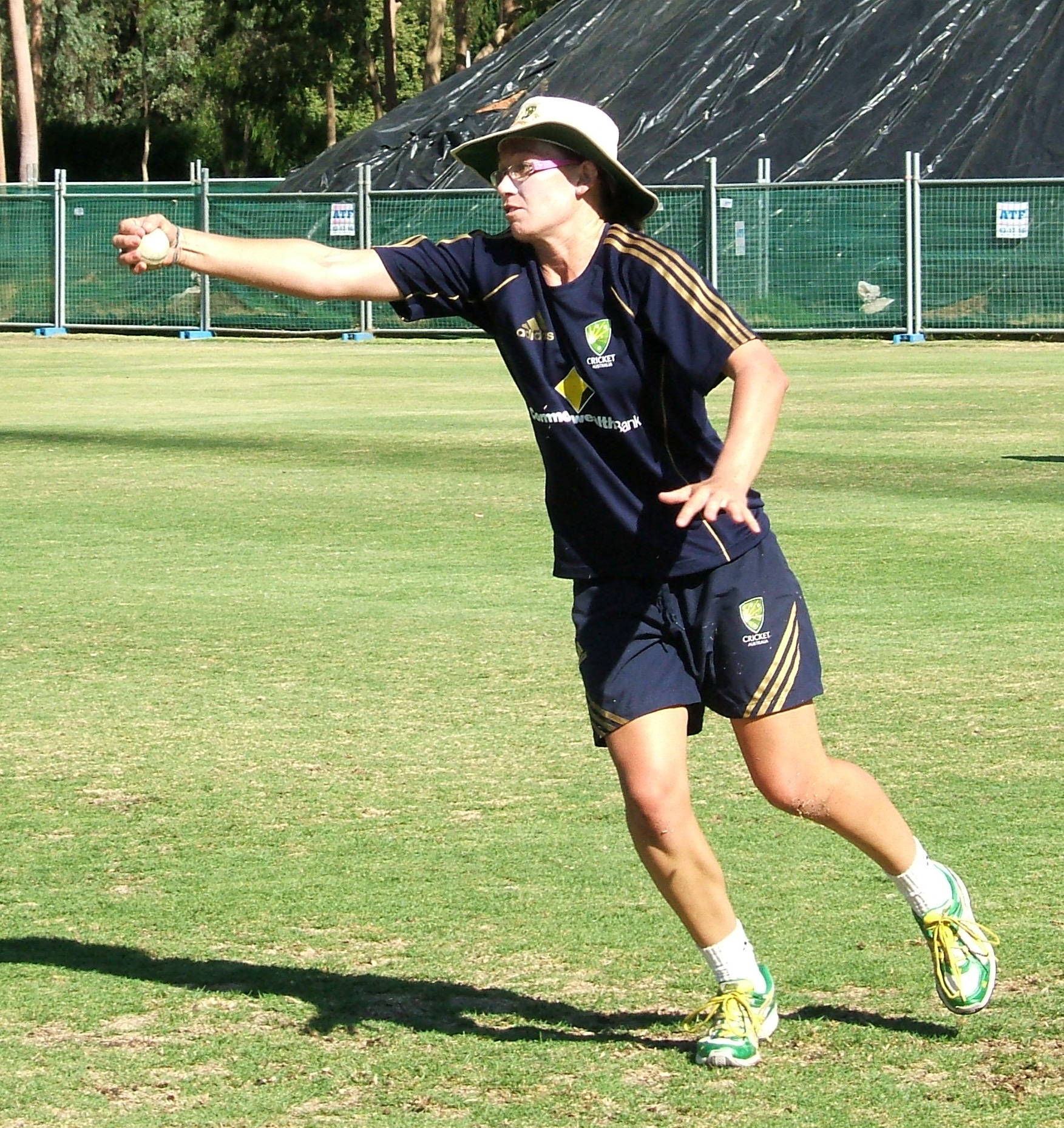
Ebsary taking a one-handed catch at training.

In the 2002–03 WNCL, Ebsary played in all eight matches, but was given less responsibility with the ball and had little success. She bowled only 23 overs and took two wickets at 34.00. She also had little effect with the bat, scoring 63 runs at 11.50 with a best score of 18. South Australia won five of their matches, narrowly missing the finals. Up to this point her batting average in 16 completed innings was 8.37.

At the start of the 2003–04 season, Ebsary was chosen in an Australian Under-23 team that played a two-innings match against the touring England team. Ebsary scored nine not out and took 4/35 and 0/4 from a total of 20 overs. She was somewhat more successful in the WNCL than in previous years, bowling 28 overs and taking five wickets at 17.00 at an economy rate of 3.03 with a best of 2/19 in the last match of the season with Victoria. She scored 91 runs at 15.16, her highest season aggregate and average to date, with a best of 26. This brought Ebsary's career average above 10 for the first time. South Australia won four of their matches and another was washed out, failing to make the final. She played in three matches for Australia Youth against New Zealand A at the end of the season, scoring 29 runs at 29.00 and taking three wickets at 16.66 at an economy rate of 4.54.

In 2004–05, Ebsary scored more than 100 runs in a WNCL season for the first time. She scored 125 runs at 20.83, averaging more than 20 for the first time in a season. Her best score of 36 not out came in a ten-wicket win over Western Australia, and in the other match against the state the preceding day, she scored 28 and took 2/26 in a 29-run win. Her best bowling performance came in the first match of the season as she took 3/32 and scored 25 in a six-wicket win over Queensland. Ebsary ended the season with six wickets at 26.83. She bowled 37 overs and conceded 4.35 runs per over.

In the 2005–06 WNCL season, Ebsary struggled to make an impact with the ball, taking four wickets at 43.00 at the relatively high economy rate of 4.91. Her figures were flattered by a haul of 3/32 in the final match of the season against Western Australia, in which she also made 26 to help seal a three-wicket win. Her batting continued to progress; she scored 149 runs at 29.80, including a best of 43 against Victoria. South Australia won five of their eight matches, again missing the finals.

Ebsary had more difficult times in the 2006–07 WNCL season. She took only three wickets at 60.33 and an economy rate of 5.14, the worst average and economy rate she had recorded for a WNCL season. She never took more than one wicket in any match. Her batting also regressed, making 101 runs at 14.42, more than half coming in a 51 against New South Wales in the last match of the season. This was Ebsary's last season for her native state as she moved to Western Australia for the 2007–08 season.

=== Move to Western Australia ===
The transfer, in 2007, coincided with an upturn in Ebsary's career. After a slow start in the new WNCL season—Western Australia lost their first five matches—Ebsary became more productive. She scored 30 of 141 and took 1/16 in a low-scoring win over New South Wales in the sixth match. In the last double-header of the season, against Queensland, she made consecutive half-centuries for the first time in her career. In the first match she made 72 before taking 4/46 to help secure a 104-run win, before scoring 62 the next day to lay the foundation for a five-wicket win. Ebsary scored 236 runs at 29.50; her previous best WNCL aggregate was 149. However, she did have trouble in running between the wickets; three of her eight dismissals were run outs. She took eight wickets at 33.87 at an economy rate of 4.43 and had a workload more than 50% heavier than in previous seasons. Ebsary was not as successful in the fledgling Twenty20 format; in two matches for the season, her first in the most abbreviated form of cricket, she scored 33 runs at 16.50 and conceded 51 runs at an economy rate of 7.46 without taking a wicket. Ebsary later said "Looking back, the move to the West has been the best thing for my cricket...After settling our line-up, it gave me a chance to let loose at the top of the order and helped my confidence to be aggressive at the batting crease...Under the leadership of Avril Fahey, the West Aussies were very welcoming and I found my groove at the top of the order."

=== International debut ===
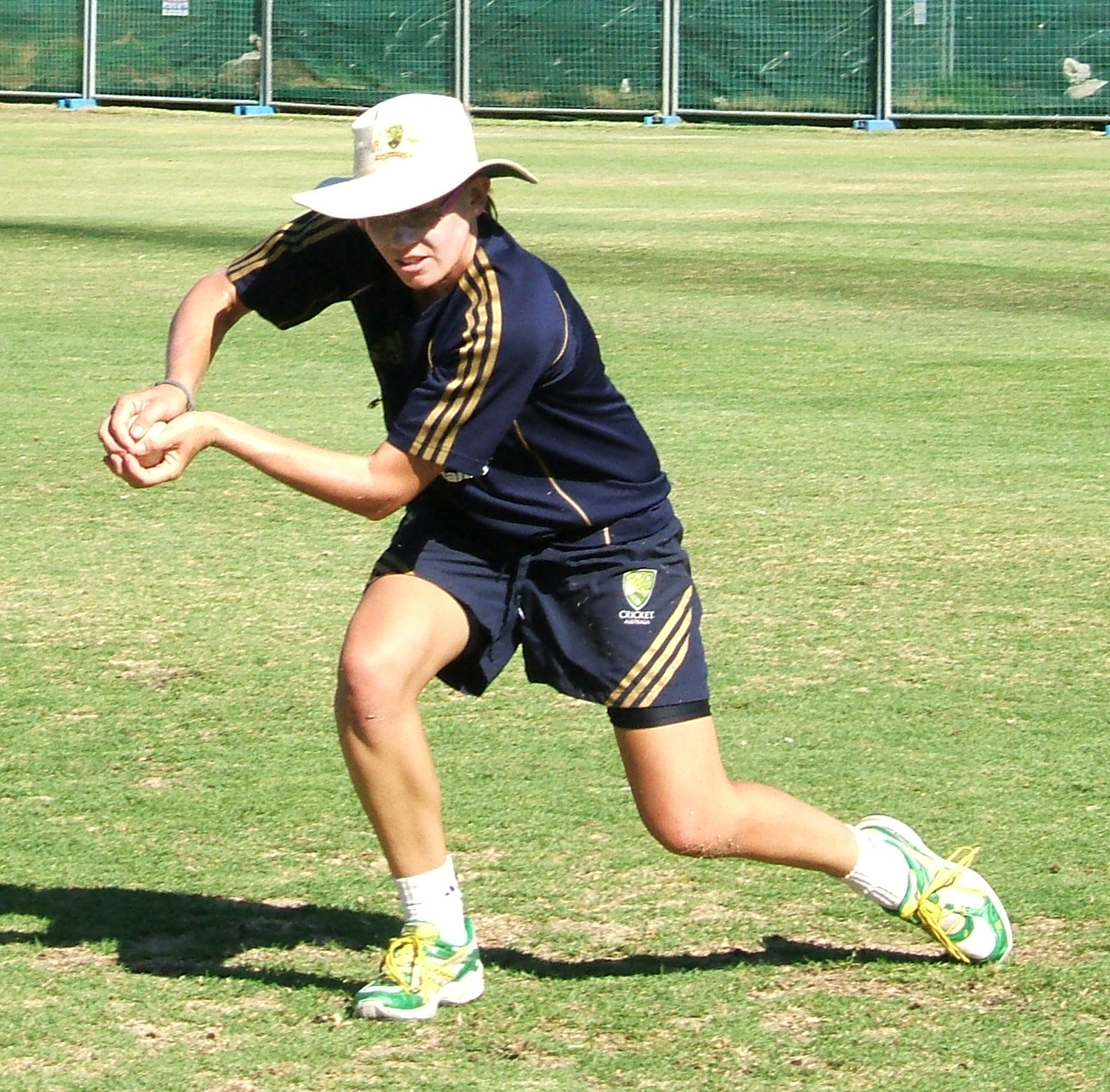
Ebsary taking a two-handed catch at training.

Ebsary was rewarded with international selection for the five-match One Day International ODI series against India at the start of the 2008–09 Australian season. Nerve damage in her toe ruled Ebsary out of contention for the first match at Hurstville Oval, which the hosts won by eight wickets with more than 12 overs to spare. The next day, she was given her debut in the second match of the series, at the Sydney Cricket Ground. Ebsary made five not out as the hosts made 6/215 batting first. Ebsary came in at 6/194 with 14 balls remaining in the Australia innings. She took a single off each of the five balls she faced, rotating the strike as her partner Lisa Sthalekar completed an unbeaten century. In the seventh over of India's reply, Ebsary's throw from the boundary ran out Jaya Sharma as the opener attempted to take a third run, leaving the tourists at 2/9.

Bowling in the middle of the innings, she then took 1/17 from five overs, her maiden wicket being Thirush Kamini caught behind by wicket-keeper Jodie Fields for one run, leaving India at 5/71 in the 26th over. She then claimed two catches to complete the eighth and ninth wickets—those of tail-enders Amita Sharma and Nooshin Al Khadeer—as Australia won by 86 runs. Ebsary went on to play in the last four matches of the series. She was promoted to the No. 4 position in the next match, but failed to capitalise on her opportunity, making a duck. She bowled five overs without taking a wicket in a 54-run win. She then made 32 from 43 balls as an opener, hitting six boundaries in the fourth ODI at Manuka Oval in Canberra, helping to set up a 118-run win. In the final match, she took 1/13 from four overs, taking the wicket of leading Indian batsman Mithali Raj and was not required to bat in a seven-wicket win. She ended her debut series with 37 runs at 18.50 and two wickets at 34.50 at an economy rate of 3.83. Australia took the series 5–0 in a dominant display; all their wins were by at least seven wickets or 54 runs.

In the WNCL, Ebsary went wicketless for the entire season for the first time, conceding 127 runs at an economy rate of 4.70. She remained productive with the bat, scoring 207 runs at 25.87, making 43 and 57, her two highest scores of the season, in the double-header against Victoria. Western Australia won three of eight matches and did not make the final. Ebsary made 34 and 25 in her two T20 matches for the season, but had no success with the ball, conceding a total of 36 runs from three overs without taking a wicket.

=== ODI and T20 World Cups in 2009 ===
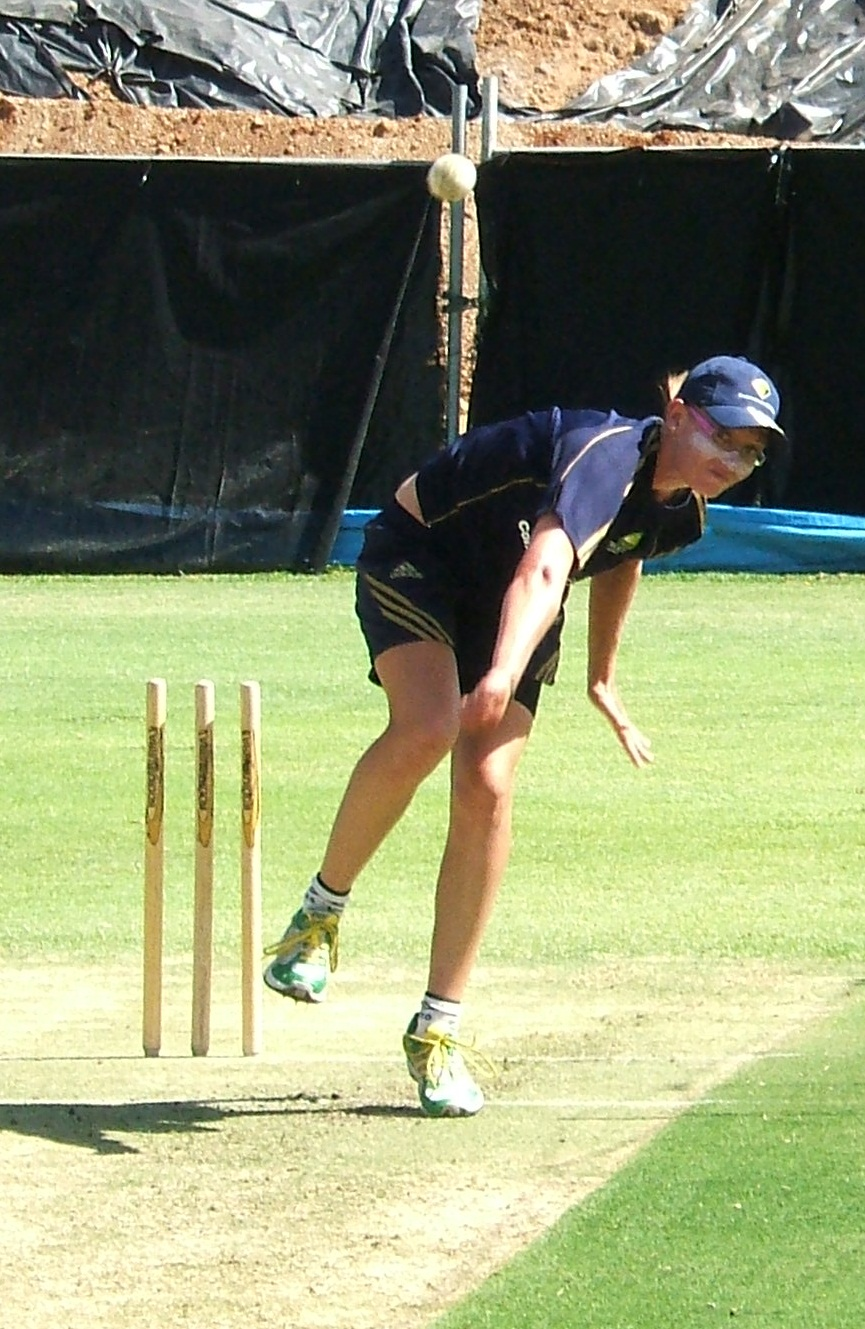
Ebsary bowling in the nets at training.

Despite her inability to take a wicket in the WNCL, Ebsary was retained in the national team and in the next five months of international cricket, she did not bowl a ball. Ahead of the 2009 World Cup, the Australians headed to New Zealand for a Rose Bowl series, Ebsary was left out of the first two ODIs against New Zealand, but was recalled for the next two matches at Seddon Park in Hamilton. She scored 30 from 47 balls in the first match before making her ODI top-score of 86 the next day. Batting at No. 3, she struck nine boundaries and faced only 76 balls, scoring at faster than a run-a-ball. This helped set up Australia's 4/307 and they went on to win by 44 runs, their second consecutive victory. The teams returned to Australia where Ebsary made her T20 international debut at the Sydney Cricket Ground. She did not bat or bowl in a rain-affected Australian win.

In two warm-up matches ahead of the World Cup in Australia, Ebsary made 18 and 8 against England and Sri Lanka respectively. Nevertheless, Ebsary was retained for the match against New Zealand, scoring one at No. 7 as Australia failed in their run-chase. It was the start of a tournament in which Ebsary was moved around in the Australian team structure. Ebsary was dropped for the second match against South Africa, which Australia won, and recalled for the last group match against the West Indies. She made 15 from 28 balls at No. 5, in a 47-run win to reach the next round. In the first Super Six match, Ebsary made 39 not out from 36 balls at No. 7 in the closing stages of the game, attempting to hold together the Australian lower-order as they fell 16 runs short of India's 5/234. She was then promoted to No. 3 in the following match, making 51 from 71 balls against Pakistan after Leah Poulton and Shelley Nitschke had put on a century opening stand, as the Australians completed a 107-run win. Ebsary was left out of the final Super Six match against England, which Australia won, which was not enough for them to reach the final. She missed the third-place playoff against India, which was lost. She ended with 106 runs at 35.33 from her four matches.

Ebsary was selected for Australia's team for the inaugural Women's World Twenty20 held in England in 2009. The Australians hosted New Zealand for a three-match series in tropical Darwin at the beginning of June before the World Cup, and Ebsary made 17.00 at 8.50 in her three innings. She then made 13 in the team's warm-up match on English soil, against the hosts, but was nevertheless retained for all the matches. She made a duck as Australia lost their opening match against New Zealand, and was not required to bat in the win over the West Indies. Ebsary made 23 run out in the final group match as Australia defeated South Africa to reach the semi-finals. There she scored eight not out before England overhauled Australia's score to reach the final, which they won. She ended the tournament with 44 runs at 22.00.

=== Test debut ===
After the World Twenty20 ended in June 2009, Ebsary stayed in England for a bilateral series against the hosts, who were the reigning world champions in both ODIs and T20s. She scored 24 not out as Australia upset England in the only T20 by 34 runs. She played in all of the five ODIs, and after making 23, 38 and 40, her form tapered away in the last two matches, making single-figure scores to end with 112 runs at 22.40. Batting in a variety of positions from No. 5 to 8, she scored quickly at a strike rate of 88.18. In the fourth match, she took 1/16, the first time she had bowled in 19 international matches, removing Claire Taylor. England won all the matches except the last, which was washed out.

Ebsary made her Test debut against England in a one-off match at County Road in Worcestershire. Australia batted first and Ebsary came to the crease at No. 9 with the total on 7/271. She scored 3 from 15 balls before being trapped leg before wicket by Katherine Brunt, as Australia were dismissed for 309. She then took 2/35. She claimed her maiden Test wicket by having Taylor caught by Poulton for 10 and then had Jenny Gunn caught behind by Jodie Fields for 41. This ended a 77-run partnership with Beth Morgan and left the hosts at 6/136 but they recovered to reach 268, still enough for Australia to take a 41-run lead. Ebsary was then promoted to No. 4 and made 21 as Australia set the hosts a target of 273 before the match was drawn.

=== 2009–2010 season ===
The WNCL was expanded in 2009–10 with the addition of the Australian Capital Territory, so ten round-robin matches were scheduled, and Ebsary played in all, scoring 211 runs at 21.10. After being wicketless the previous season, she took seven wickets at 31.28, although opposition batsmen did attack her bowling, scoring 5.17 runs per over. Her best batting and bowling performances came in the same match against her native state, taking 3/37 from nine overs to help dismiss them for 191 before scoring 48 to help secure a two-wicket win. In the last two matches of the season, she scored 43 and 42 in consecutive wins over Queensland.

Ebsary had a successful time in the domestic T20s, now part of a full interstate tournament instead of a series of one-off matches, scoring 137 runs at 22.83 and taking four wickets at 26.25 at an economy rate of 7.50. Her best score of 41 came in a win over Tasmania on 11 November 2009. She also scored 29 and took 2/14 in a win over the Australian Capital Territory on 11 December 2009.

Ebsary was retained for the Rose Bowl series against New Zealand and played in the first four ODIs in Australia in February 2010. She made 31 runs at 15.50 in the first two matches and, after Poulton had made a century in the fourth match, was dropped for the fifth and final match as the hosts took a clean sweep. The ODIs were followed by three T20 matches at Bellerive Oval in Hobart and two more in New Zealand. Ebsary played in the first four T20 games, scoring 39 runs at 9.75 before being left out of the final match as New Zealand took a clean sweep. She was overlooked for the three ODIs in New Zealand, which the tourists swept.

=== Post 2010 ===
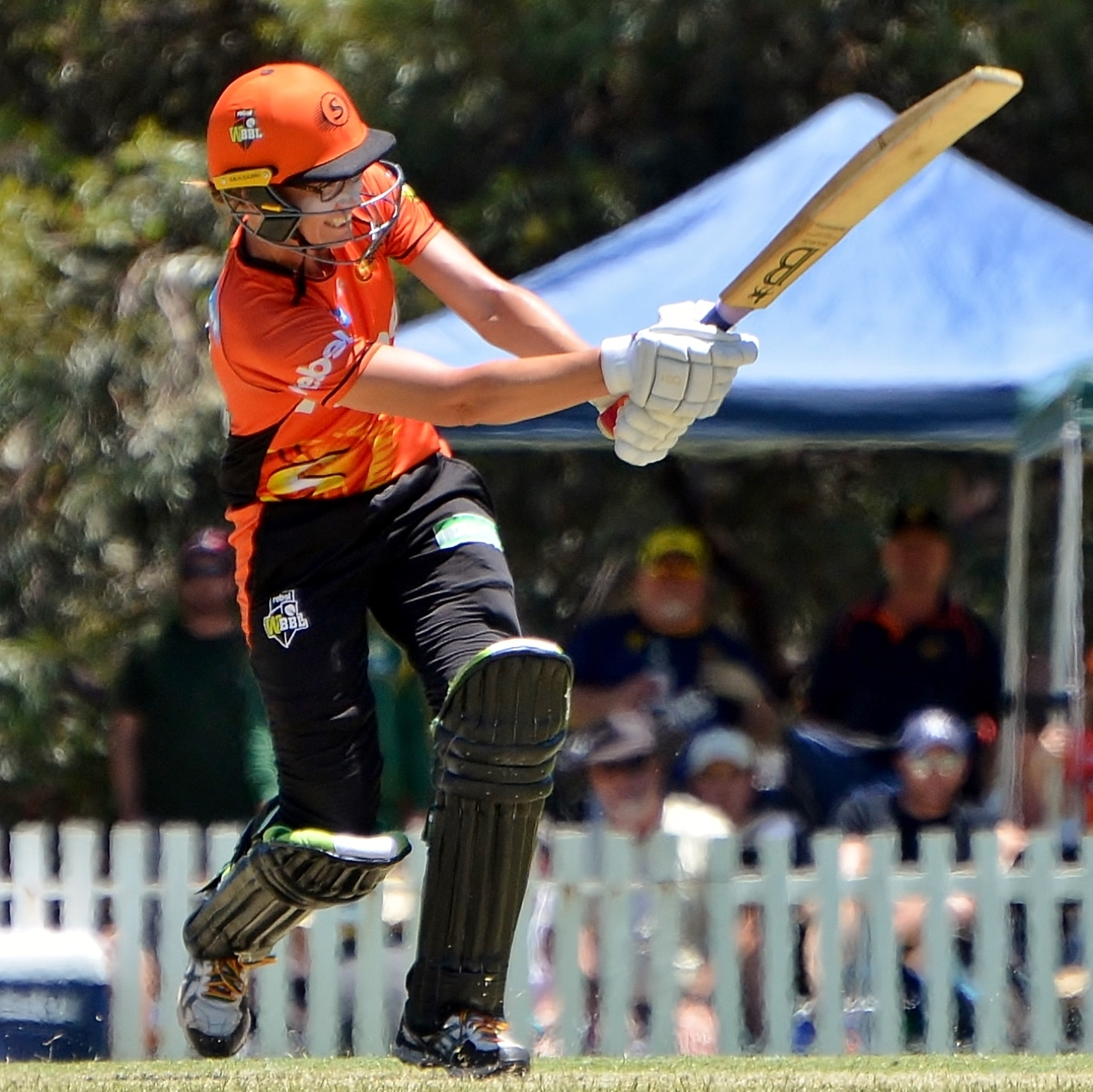
Ebsary batting for Perth Scorchers, 2018

From October 2010 until November 2015, Ebsary played domestic cricket in the South Australia Women's team. She also played in the New Zealand Women's One-Day Competition in the 2013/14 season for the Wellington Women's team.

Ebsary played in the Women's Big Bash League in the 2015/2016 season for the Adelaide Strikers Women's team. In November 2018, she was named in the Perth Scorchers' squad for the 2018–19 Women's Big Bash League season.

== Personal life ==
Ebsary's nickname is "Beep". She has said that "when I was little my uncle used to press on my nose and go 'beep' and it just stuck, I even went to kindy and thought that was my real name!"
