= Kath Hempenstall =

Australian cricketer (born 1988)

Personal information
- Born: 20 September 1988 (age 38); Brunswick, Victoria
- Batting: Right-handed
- Bowling: Right-arm medium

Domestic team information
- Years: Team
- 2019: Perth Scorchers

Head coaching information
- Years: Team
- 2021–: Papua New Guinea Women
- Source: Cricinfo, 3 December 2020

Kath Hempenstall (born 20 September 1988) is an Australian cricket coach and former player. She played for the Perth Scorchers in the Women's Big Bash League (WBBL). She played in two matches for the team in the 2019–20 Women's Big Bash League season.

In 2021, Hempenstall was appointed head coach of the Papua New Guinea women's national cricket team.
