= Sharon Millanta =

Australian cricketer

Personal information
- Full name: Sharon Anne Millanta
- Born: 28 May 1980 (age 46); Auburn, New South Wales, Australia
- Batting: Left-handed
- Bowling: Right arm medium

International information
- National side: Australia (2011–2012)
- ODI debut (cap 120): 14 June 2011 v New Zealand
- Last ODI: 19 December 2012 v New Zealand
- T20I debut (cap 34): 1 February 2012 v New Zealand
- Last T20I: 23 March 2012 v India

Domestic team information
- Years: Team
- 2000/01–2013/14: New South Wales

Career statistics
Competition	WODI	WT20I	LA	T20
Matches	6	4	67	63
Runs scored	21	0	33	2
Batting average	21.00	0.00	11.00	2.00
100s/50s	0/0	0/0	0/0	0/0
Top score	15*	0	15*	1*
Balls bowled	293	72	2,402	1,077
Wickets	4	1	43	54
Bowling average	72.50	62.00	37.46	18.29
5 wickets in innings	0	0	0	1
10 wickets in match	0	0	0	0
Best bowling	1/40	1/21	4/24	5/10
Catches/stumpings	0/–	0/–	9/–	5/–
- Source: CricketArchive, 14 June 2025

Sharon Millanta (born 28 May 1980) is an Australian cricketer. She played six One Day Internationals and four Twenty20 Internationals for the Australia national women's cricket team.

== Cricket career ==
Millanta began playing cricket for the New South Wales Breakers in the 2000/01 season, playing in the Women's National Cricket League (WNCL). For the next ten years, she was in and out of the team while she also maintained another job as an occupational therapist. Millanta finally secured her place in the New South Wales side during the 2009/10 season.

In June 2011, a fortnight after he 31st birthday, Millanta was selected to play for the Australian national cricket team. The pay for female players was poor, and she received no compensation for the income she lost when she had to take leave from her other job. In 2011 and 2012, Millanta represented Australia in 10 international matches: 6 One Day Internationals and 4 Twenty20 Internationals. She played for Australia for the final time against India in March 2012.

Millanta retired from cricket after the 2013/14 season. She announced her decision to retire following New South Wales's victory in the February 2014 WNCL final, where she took one wicket.
