= Elyse Villani =

Australian cricketer

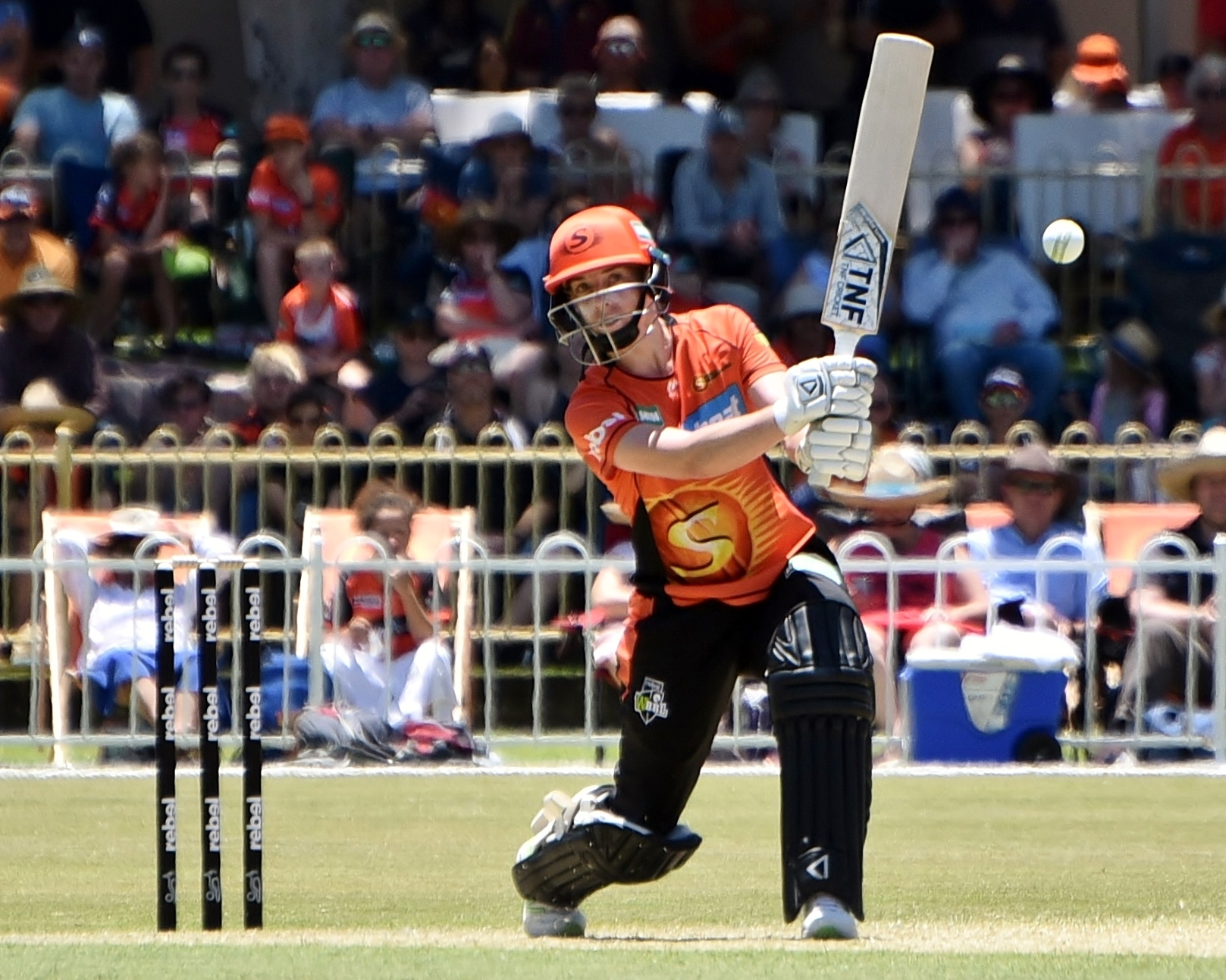
- Villani batting for Perth Scorchers.

Personal information
- Full name: Elyse Jane Villani
- Born: 6 October 1989 (age 37); Melbourne, Victoria, Australia
- Batting: Right-handed
- Bowling: Right arm fast medium
- Role: Batter

International information
- National side: Australia (2009–2019)
- Test debut (cap 167): 10 January 2014 v England
- Last Test: 9 November 2017 v England
- ODI debut (cap 126): 19 January 2014 v England
- Last ODI: 3 March 2019 v New Zealand
- T20I debut (cap 27): 3 June 2009 v New Zealand
- Last T20I: 24 November 2018 v England

Domestic team information
- Years: Team
- 2007/08–2014/15: Victoria
- 2012: Staffordshire
- 2014/15: Northern Districts
- 2015/16–2017/18: Western Australia
- 2018/19–2020/21: Victoria
- 2021/22–present: Tasmania
- 2015/16–2018/19: Perth Scorchers
- 2017–2018: Loughborough Lightning
- 2019/20–2021/22: Melbourne Stars
- 2022: Trent Rockets
- 2022/23–present: Hobart Hurricanes

Career statistics
Competition	Test	ODI	T20I	LA
Matches	3	34	62	181
Runs scored	72	603	1,369	5,937
Batting average	14.40	21.53	28.52	36.87
100s/50s	0/0	0/3	0/12	15/28
Top score	33	75	90*	174*
Balls bowled	6	252	–	420
Wickets	0	7	–	9
Bowling average	–	35.71	–	46.66
5 wickets in innings	–	0	–	0
10 wickets in match	–	0	–	0
Best bowling	–	3/42	–	3/42
Catches/stumpings	2/–	16/–	16/–	75/–
- Source: CricketArchive, 6 August 2025

Elyse Jayne Villani (born 6 October 1989) is an Australian cricketer who played for the Australia national women's team from 2009 to 2019. She has also played domestic cricket for various teams in both the Women's National Cricket League (WNCL) and the Women's Big Bash League (WBBL).

== Cricket career ==
Villani began playing domestic cricket for Victoria. She played for the Australia under-21 side in 2008. This team beat the senior Australian team in January 2008 in a match where Villani scored 85 runs from 78 balls, then came within 6 runs of defeating them again in October 2008. She was one of six members of the under-21 team to be named in Australia's 30-player preliminary squad for the 2009 Women's Cricket World Cup, but she was not in the final squad for the tournament.

Villani made her international cricket debut for Australia in 2009 in a Women's Twenty20 International against New Zealand. She was part of the Victorian team that won the inaugural Australian Women's Twenty20 Cup and part of Australia's team for the 2010 ICC Women's World Twenty20, but she lost her place in the national team after the tournament. She didn't return to international cricket until 2013. In the 2013–14 Women's Ashes series, she played for Australia in all three formats, making her Test and ODI debuts.

Villani played for Australia in the 2014 ICC Women's World Twenty20 in Bangladesh. She helped Australia win their final group match, scoring 90 runs from 54 balls against Pakistan. She was one of the biggest boundary-hitters of the Australian team, who made it to the final against England, which they won.

In June 2015, she was named as one of Australia's touring party for the 2015 Women's Ashes in England.

In April 2018, she was one of the fourteen players to be awarded a national contract for the 2018–19 season by Cricket Australia. In October 2018, she was named in Australia's squad for the 2018 ICC Women's World Twenty20 tournament in the West Indies.

In November 2018, she was named in the Perth Scorchers' squad for the 2018–19 Women's Big Bash League season. In April 2019, Cricket Australia awarded her with a contract ahead of the 2019–20 season. In June 2019, Cricket Australia named her in Australia's team for their tour to England to contest the Women's Ashes.

In January 2022, Villani was named in Australia's A squad for their series against England A, with the matches being played alongside the Women's Ashes.

Elyse Villani captained the Tasmanian Tigers to three consecutive Women's National Cricket League titles, winning in the 2021–22, 2022–23, and 2023–24 seasons. Her strong leadership and consistent batting performance, including a century in the 2023 Grand Final, were pivotal to the team's dominant run.

== Personal life ==
Villani was a student at Eltham College in Melbourne.

She came out as lesbian in 2015, the second member of the Australian team to do so after Alex Blackwell.

Villani's nickname is "Junior". She is an ambassador for Gray-Nicolls.
