= Tasmania women's cricket team =

Australian state team

Tasmania

Personnel
- Captain: Elyse Villani
- Coach: Jude Coleman

Team information
- Colours: Green Gold Red
- Founded: First recorded match: 1906
- Home ground: Ninja Stadium, Hobart
- Capacity: 19,500
- Secondary home ground(s): Tasmania Cricket Association Ground, Hobart

History
- First-class debut: South Australia in 1985 at Flinders University No 3, Adelaide
- WNCL wins: 3
- Official website: Tasmanian Tigers Women

The Tasmania women's cricket team, nicknamed the Tigers and previously the Roar, is the women's representative cricket team for the Australian State of Tasmania. They play their home games at Ninja Stadium, Hobart. They compete in the Women's National Cricket League (WNCL), the premier 50-over women's cricket tournament in Australia. They previously played in the now-defunct Australian Women's Twenty20 Cup and Australian Women's Cricket Championships.

== History ==
=== 1906–1984: Early history ===
Tasmania's first recorded match was against Victoria on 17 March 1906. A second match against Victoria was also recorded on 23 March 1906. Their next recorded match did not take place until 27 December 1979, when they played Victoria Women's Cricket Association President's XI.

=== 1985–1991: Australian Women's Cricket Championships ===
Tasmania joined the Australian Women's Cricket Championships for the 1985–86 season. Their first match was a loss to South Australia by an innings and 124 runs. Tasmania failed to win a match and finished bottom of the table. Tasmania made further appearances in the Australian Women's Cricket Championships in 1987–88 and 1990–91, finishing bottom both times. They also appeared in the Women's Australian Under-21 Championships in 1985/86 and 1986/87.

=== 2009–present: Twenty20 Cup and Women's National Cricket League ===
Tasmania joined the Australian Women's Twenty20 Cup as Tasmanian Roar for the 2009–10 season, finishing bottom of the table. They joined the WNCL for the 2010–11 season, but again finished bottom. Tasmania's best finish in the Twenty20 Cup came in its final season, 2014–15, when they finished fourth. On 4 June 2018, Cricket Tasmania announced that the name of the team would change to the Tasmanian Tigers, aligning their branding with the men's team.

They finished third in the WNCL in 2018–19 and 2020–21. They won their first WNCL title in 2021–22, topping the group stage before beating South Australia in the final by 9 wickets. They defended their title in 2022–23, again beating South Australia in the final. They won the title again in 2023-24 season for third year straight against Queensland by 6 wickets.

== Grounds ==
Tasmania's first recorded home match against Victoria Women's Cricket Association President's XI was played at the North West Tasmania Cricket Association Ground in Burnie. Since 2008, when they started to play regular matches, Tasmania have predominantly used Bellerive Oval in Hobart. They have also used other grounds in Hobart such as Lindisfarne Oval, New Town Oval, the TCA Ground, Kingston Beach Oval and Kingston Twin Ovals. Outside Hobart, they have also played occasional matches at NTCA Ground and York Park, both in Launceston.

Both of Tasmania's home matches in the 2019–20 WNCL were played at the TCA Ground. They played three 2020–21 WNCL home games at Blundstone Arena and two at Kingston Twin Ovals, whilst since the 2021–22 season they only used Blundstone Arena for their home matches.

== Players ==
=== Current squad ===
Based on squad announced for the 2026/27 season. Players in bold have international caps.

No.	Name	Nat.	Birth date	Batting style	Bowling style	Notes
Batters
51	Tabatha Saville	(Australia)	13 April 1998 (age 28)	Right-handed	Right-arm medium	
5	**Naomi Stalenberg**	(Australia)	18 April 1994 (age 32)	Right-handed	Right-arm medium	
8	Rachel Trenaman	(Australia)	18 April 2001 (age 25)	Right-handed	Right-arm leg break	
2	**Elyse Villani**	(Australia)	6 October 1989 (age 37)	Right-handed	Right-arm medium	Captain
All-rounders
	Mia Barwick	(Australia)	13 October 2010 (age 16)	Right-handed	Right-arm medium	Rookie Contract
16	**Nicola Carey**	(Australia)	10 September 1993 (age 33)	Left-handed	Right-arm medium	
–	Ava Curtis	(Australia)		Right-handed	Right-arm medium	Rookie Contract
	**Alice Davidson-Richards**	(England)	29 May 1994 (age 32)	Right-handed	Right-arm medium-fast	
	Ella Hayward	(Australia)	8 September 2003 (age 23)	Right-handed	Right-arm off break	
11	Ruth Johnston	(Australia)	28 February 2003 (age 23)	Right-handed	Right-arm off break	
Wicket-keepers
67	**Lizelle Lee**	(South Africa) (Australia)	2 April 1992 (age 34)	Right-handed	Right-arm medium	Considered a domestic player
	Caity Mair	(Australia)	5 May 2003 (age 23)	Right-handed		
	Kate Pelle	(Australia)	17 January 2006 (age 20)	Right-handed		
Bowlers
13	Maisy Gibson	(Australia)	14 September 1996 (age 30)	Left-handed	Right-arm leg break	
-	Sara Kennedy	(Australia)	7 August 2007 (age 19)	Right-handed	Left-arm medium	
4	Hayley Silver-Holmes	(Australia)	18 August 2003 (age 23)	Right-handed	Right-arm medium-fast	
	Courtney Sippel	(Australia)	27 April 2001 (age 25)	Left-handed	Right-arm medium	
6	Lauren Smith	(Australia)	6 October 1996 (age 30)	Right-handed	Right-arm off break	
5	Callie Wilson	(Australia)	1 November 2003 (age 22)	Right-handed	Right-arm medium-fast	

=== Notable players ===
Players who have played for Tasmania and played internationally are listed below, in order of first international appearance (given in brackets):

- (Australia) Kim Fazackerley (1992)
- (Australia) Julia Price (1996)
- (Australia) Mel Jones (1997)
- (Ireland) Isobel Joyce (1999)
- (New Zealand) Rachel Priest (2007)
- (New Zealand) Amy Satterthwaite (2007)
- (New Zealand) Elyse Villani (2009)
- (Australia) Julie Hunter (2010)
- (England) Heather Knight (2010)
- (Australia) Sarah Coyte (2010)
- (South Africa) Lizelle Lee (2013)
- (Cricket West Indies) Hayley Matthews (2014)
- (Australia) Naomi Stalenberg (2016)
- (England) Alex Hartley (2016)
- (Australia) Molly Strano (2017)
- (Australia) Belinda Vakarewa (2017)
- (Australia) Nicola Carey (2018)
- (England) Alice Davidson-Richards (2018)
- (Ireland) Celeste Raack (2018)
- (Australia) Erin Burns (2019)
- (Australia) Heather Graham (2019)
- (England) Hollie Armitage (2024)

== Coaching staff ==
- Head coach: Jude Coleman
- Assistant coach: Dan Marsh
- Assistant coach: Alex Pyecroft
- Assistant coach: Clive Rose
- Female Pathway Coach: Natalie Schilov
- Physiotherapist: Emily Khalfan
- Strength & Conditioning Coach: Ross Brosnan

== Honours ==
- Women's National Cricket League:
  - Winners (3): 2021–22, 2022–23 & 2023–24
- Australian Women's Cricket Championships:
  - Winners (0):
  - Best finish: 7th (1985–86, 1987–88, 1990–91)
- Australian Women's Twenty20 Cup:
  - Winners (0):
  - Best finish: 4th (2014–15)

== See also ==
- Cricket Tasmania
- Tasmania men's cricket team
- Hobart Hurricanes (WBBL)
