= Western Australia women's cricket team =

Women's cricket team

Western Australia

Personnel
- Captain: Chloe Piparo
- Coach: Rebecca Grundy

Team information
- Colours: Gold Black
- Founded: First recorded match: 1934
- Home ground: WACA Ground, Perth

History
- First-class debut: England in 1934 at WACA Ground, Perth
- AWCC wins: 1
- WNCL wins: 1
- WT20C wins: 0
- Official website: WACA

The Western Australia women's cricket team, previously known as Western Fury, is the women's representative cricket team for the Australian State of Western Australia. They play their home games at WACA West Ground, Perth. They compete in the Women's National Cricket League (WNCL), the premier 50-over women's cricket tournament in Australia. They previously played in the now-defunct Australian Women's Twenty20 Cup and Australian Women's Cricket Championships.

== History ==
=== 1934–1935: Early history ===
Western Australia's first recorded match was a draw against England in a two-day tourist match from 24 to 26 November 1934.

=== 1936–1996: Australian Women's Cricket Championships ===
Western Australia joined the Australian Women's Cricket Championships for the 1936–37 tournament. They continued to play in the Championships until its final season in 1995–96. Western Australia won the title on one occasion, in 1986–87.

=== 1996–present: Women's National Cricket League and Twenty20 Cup ===
Western Australia joined the newly established WNCL in 1996–97. They have won the title once, in 2019–20. Their best finish in the Australian Women's Twenty20 Cup was runners-up in 2012–13, when they lost the final to New South Wales by 5 wickets.

On 29 July 2019, the Western Australian Cricket Association announced that the name of the team would change from Western Fury to simply Western Australia Women, alongside a similar change to the men's team which dropped its "Warriors" nickname.

== Grounds ==
Western Australia have used a number of grounds over the years. Their first recorded home match against England in 1934 was played at the WACA Ground, Perth. Historically they have played the vast majority of their home matches at various grounds in Perth. Outside Perth, they have played sporadic matches in other locations including Geraldton, Crawley, Fremantle and Baldivis.

After the inception of the WNCL in 1996, Western Australia began playing regular matches at the WACA Ground. They have also continued to use other grounds, most regularly Murdoch University West Oval in Perth. Their two 2019–20 WNCL home games and their four 2020–21 WNCL home games were played at the WACA Ground. They did not play any home matches in the 2021–22 WNCL due to COVID-19 restrictions. In the 2022–23 WNCL, they returned to playing all of their home matches at the WACA Ground.

== Players ==
=== Current squad ===
Based on squad announced for the 2023/24 season. Players in bold have international caps.

| No. | Name | Nat. | Birth date | Batting style | Bowling style | Notes |
Batters
| 5 | Mathilda Carmichael | (Australia) | 4 April 1994 (age 32) | Right-handed | Right-arm medium | |
| 49 | Mikayla Hinkley | (Australia) | 1 May 1998 (age 28) | Right-handed | Right-arm medium | |
| 5 | Rebecca McGrath | (Australia) | 12 February 2005 (age 21) | Right-handed | —N/a | |
| 28 | **Chloe Piparo** | (Italy) | 5 September 1994 (age 32) | Right-handed | Right-arm off break | Captain |
All-rounders
| 20 | Chloe Ainsworth | (Australia) | 14 September 2005 (age 21) | Right-handed | Right-arm medium | |
| 5 | Bhavi Devchand | (Australia) | 24 December 1992 (age 33) | Right-handed | Right-arm leg break | |
| 9 | Amy Edgar | (Australia) | 27 December 1997 (age 28) | Right-handed | Right-arm medium | |
| 18 | Lisa Griffith | (Australia) | 28 August 1992 (age 34) | Right-handed | Right-arm medium | |
| 23 | **Alana King** | (Australia) | 22 November 1995 (age 30) | Right-handed | Right-arm leg break | |
Wicket-keepers
| 7 | Maddy Darke | (Australia) | 30 March 2001 (age 25) | Right-handed | Right-arm off break | |
| 55 | **Ines McKeon** | (France) | 19 April 2007 (age 19) | Right-handed | Right-arm medium | |
| 10 | **Beth Mooney** | (Australia) | 14 January 1994 (age 32) | Left-handed | – | |
Bowlers
| 18 | Chloe Bartholomew | (Australia) | unknown | Right-handed | Right-arm medium | |
| 26 | Charis Bekker | (Australia) | 14 March 2004 (age 22) | Right-handed | Slow left-arm orthodox | |
| 46 | Zoe Britcliffe | (Australia) | 15 September 2001 (age 25) | Right-handed | Right-arm medium | |
| 8 | Piepa Cleary | (Australia) | 17 July 1996 (age 30) | Right-handed | Right-arm medium | |
| 14 | Shay Manolini | (Australia) | 13 April 2005 (age 21) | Right-handed | Right-arm leg break | |
| 56 | Lilly Mills | (Australia) | 2 January 2001 (age 25) | Right-handed | Right-arm off break | |
| 6 | Taneale Peschel | (Australia) | 29 August 1994 (age 32) | Right-handed | Right-arm medium | |

=== Notable players ===
Players who have played for Western Australia and played internationally are listed below, in order of first international appearance (given in brackets):

- (Australia) June James (1951)
- (Australia) Marie McDonough (1958)
- (Australia) Dawn Newman (1968)
- (Australia) Joyce Goldsmith (1968)
- (Australia) Betty McDonald (1973)
- (Australia) Lynette Smith (1973)
- (Australia) Wendy Hills (1976)
- (Australia) Peta Verco (1977)
- (England) Jill Powell (1979)
- (Australia) Denise Emerson (1982)
- (Australia) Denise Martin (1982)
- (Australia) Terri Russell (1982)
- (Australia) Rhonda Kendall (1982)
- (Australia) Jenny Owens (1982)
- (Australia) Karen Read (1982)
- (Australia) Debbie Wilson (1984)
- (Australia) Judy Esmond (1985)
- (Australia) Frances Leonard (1986)
- (Australia) Zoe Goss (1987)
- (Australia) Avril Fahey (1995)
- (England) Charlotte Edwards (1996)
- (Australia) Cherie Bambury (1997)
- (England) Sarah Collyer (1998)
- (New Zealand) Kate Pulford (1999)
- (England) Dawn Holden (1999)
- (England) Nicky Shaw (1999)
- (England) Laura Joyce (2001)
- (England) Kate Oakenfold (2001)
- (England) Jenny Gunn (2004)
- (Australia) Kate Blackwell (2004)
- (New Zealand) Suzie Bates (2006)
- (New Zealand) Sarah Tsukigawa (2006)
- (New Zealand) Sophie Devine (2006)
- (Australia) Rene Farrell (2007)
- (Australia) Lauren Ebsary (2008)
- (Australia) Jess Duffin (2009)
- (Australia) Elyse Villani (2009)
- (Australia) Renee Chappell (2013)
- (England) Amy Jones (2013)
- (England) Tash Farrant (2013)
- (England) Kate Cross (2013)
- (Australia) Nicole Bolton (2014)
- (New Zealand) Leigh Kasperek (2015)
- (Australia) Beth Mooney (2016)
- (Australia) Heather Graham (2019)
- (England) Maia Bouchier (2021)
- (Australia) Alana King (2022)
- (France) Ines McKeon (2023)
- (England) Emily Arlott (2025)
- (Italy) Chloe Piparo (2025)

== Coaching staff ==
- Head coach: Rebecca Grundy
- Senior Assistant Coach: Wes Robinson
- Assistant Coach: Kath Hempenstall
- Development Coach: Ryan Hosking

== Honours ==
- Australian Women's Cricket Championships:
  - Winners (1): 1986–87
- Women's National Cricket League:
  - Winners (1): 2019–20
- Australian Women's Twenty20 Cup:
  - Winners (0):
  - Best finish: Runners-up (2012–13)

== See also ==
- Western Australian Cricket Association
- Western Australia men's cricket team
- Perth Scorchers (WBBL)
- Cricket in Western Australia
