= Queensland women's cricket team =

Australian cricket team

Queensland

Personnel
- Captain: Georgia Redmayne

Team information
- Colours: Maroon Gold
- Founded: First recorded match: 1931
- Home ground: Allan Border Field, Brisbane
- Capacity: 6,500
- Secondary home ground(s): Fehlberg Park, Kerrydale Oval

History
- First-class debut: New South Wales in 1934 at Weigall Oval, Sydney
- AWCC wins: 0
- WNCL wins: 2
- WT20C wins: 1
- Official website: Queensland Fire

The Queensland women's cricket team, also known as the Queensland Fire, is the women's representative cricket team for the Australian State of Queensland. They play most of their home games at Allan Border Field, Brisbane and they also use South Brisbane District Cricket Club's Fehlberg Oval and Kerrydale Oval, Robina. They compete in the Women's National Cricket League (WNCL), the premier 50-over women's cricket tournament in Australia. They previously played in the now-defunct Australian Women's Twenty20 Cup and Australian Women's Cricket Championships.

== History ==
=== 1931–1996: Australian Women's Cricket Championships ===
Queensland's first recorded match was a one-day, two-innings affair against New South Wales in the Australian Women's Cricket Championships on 23 March 1931, which they lost by an innings and 51 runs. They continued to play in the Championships until its final season in 1995–96, however, they failed to win the title.

=== 1996–present: Women's National Cricket League and Twenty20 Cup ===
Queensland joined the newly established WNCL in 1996–97. They finished as runners-up in 2000–01, 2005–06, 2012–13, 2016–17 and 2018–19, before winning their first title in 2020–21. They have won one Australian Women's Twenty20 Cup, in 2013–14.

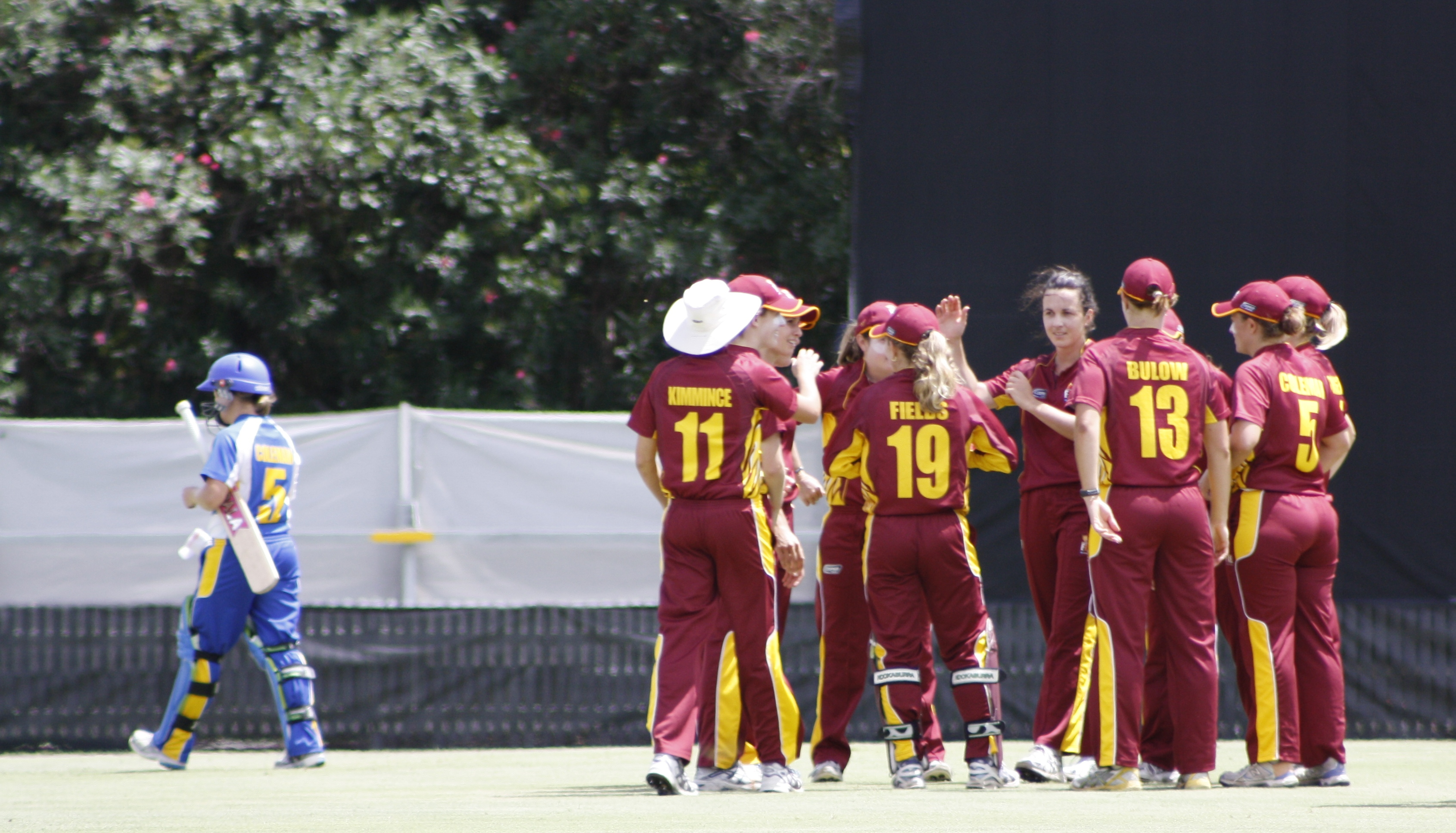
The Fire celebrating a wicket versus the ACT Meteors.

== Grounds ==
Queensland have used a number of grounds over the years. Their first recorded home match against New South Wales in 1933 was played at the Exhibition Ground, Brisbane. Historically they have played the vast majority of their home matches at various grounds in Brisbane including intermittent matches at the Gabba, the last of which came in 2016. They have also played occasional matches in Toowoomba and Beenleigh.

Since 2017, Queensland have played most of their home matches at Allan Border Field, Brisbane as well as occasional matches at Fehlberg Park in Brisbane and Kerrydale Oval in Robina. They played their three 2020–21 WNCL home games at Allan Border Field. After playing all their matches in the 2021–22 WNCL away from home, in the 2022–23 WNCL they used Allan Border Field, Kerrydale Oval and, for the first time, Ian Healy Oval.

== Players ==
=== Current squad ===
Based on squad announced for the 2026/27 season. Players in bold have international caps.

No.	Name	Nat.	Birth date	Batting style	Bowling style	Notes
Batters
7	Lucinda Bourke	(Australia)	2 September 2005 (age 21)	Right-handed	Right-arm medium	
18	Annie O'Neil	(Australia)	18 February 1999 (age 27)	Right-handed	Right-arm leg spin	
12	Grace Collins	(Australia)	1 January 1995 (age 31)	Right-handed	Right-arm fast-medium	
All-rounders
11	Sianna Ginger	(Australia)	26 July 2005 (age 21)	Right-handed	Right-arm fast-medium	
17	**Grace Harris**	(Australia)	18 September 1993 (age 33)	Right-handed	Right-arm off break	Cricket Australia Contract
21	Jess Jonassen	(Australia)	5 November 1992 (age 33)	Left-handed	Slow left-arm orthodox	
88	Charli Knott	(Australia)	29 November 2002 (age 23)	Right-handed	Right-arm off break	
19	**Georgia Voll**	(Australia)	5 August 2003 (age 23)	Right-handed	Right-arm off break	Cricket Australia Contract
Wicket-keepers
8	Georgia Redmayne	(Australia)	8 December 1993 (age 32)	Left-handed	—	Captain
58	**Lauren Winfield-Hill ‡**	(England)	16 August 1990 (age 36)	Right-handed	Right-arm medium	
96	Mikayla Wrigley	(Australia)	12 February 2004 (age 22)	Right-handed	Right-arm medium	
Bowlers
22	Lily Bassingthwaighte	(Australia)	March 25, 2007 (age 19)	Right-handed	Right-arm medium	
2	Bonnie Berry	(Australia)	24 February 2006 (age 20)	Right-handed	Right-arm medium	
10	Lilli Hamilton	(Netherlands)	22 November 2007 (age 18)	Right-handed	Right-arm off spin	
5	**Lucy Hamilton**	(Australia)	8 May 2006 (age 20)	Left-handed	Left-arm fast	
44	Nicola Hancock	(Australia)	8 November 1995 (age 30)	Right-handed	Right-arm medium	
34	Grace Parsons	(Australia)	18 August 2003 (age 23)	Right-handed	Right-arm leg break	
15	Catherine White	(Australia)	July 4, 2007 (age 19)	Right-handed	Right-arm fast	
6	Aya Stafford	(Australia)	29 March 2010 (age 16)	Right-handed	Right-arm leg spin	Rookie contract
53	Filippa SueSee	(Australia)	22 June 2009 (age 17)	Right-handed	Right-arm fast	Rookie contract

=== Notable players ===
Players who have played for Queensland and played internationally are listed below, in order of first international appearance (given in brackets):

- (Australia) Kath Smith (1934)
- (Australia) Joyce Brewer (1935)
- (Australia) Val Slater (1957)
- (Australia) Glenda Hall (1984)
- (Netherlands) (New Zealand) Nicola Payne (1988) (Note: Payne represented both the Netherlands and New Zealand in international cricket.)
- (Australia) Katherine Raymont (1990)
- (Australia) Joanne Broadbent (1990)
- (Australia) Kim Fazackerley (1992)
- (Australia) Sharyn Bow (1993)
- (Australia) Julia Price (1996)
- (Australia) Jodi Dannatt (1997)
- (Australia) Megan White (1999)
- (England) Dawn Holden (1999)
- (Australia) Sally Cooper (2001)
- (Australia) Melissa Bulow (2003)
- (Australia) Kirsten Pike (2005)
- (Australia) Jodie Fields (2006)
- (Australia) Delissa Kimmince (2008)
- (Australia) Jess Duffin (2009)
- (Australia) Jess Jonassen (2012)
- (Australia) Holly Ferling (2013)
- (England) Lauren Winfield-Hill (2013)
- (New Zealand) Felicity Leydon-Davis (2014)
- (Australia) Grace Harris (2015)
- (Australia) Beth Mooney (2016)
- (Australia) Georgia Voll (2024)

== Coaching staff ==
- Head coach: Mark Sorell
- Assistant coach: Courtney Winfield-Hill
- Physiotherapist: Jolandi Jacobs

== Honours ==
- Australian Women's Cricket Championships:
  - Winners (0):
  - Best finish: runners-up (1938–39)
- Women's National Cricket League:
  - Winners (2): 2020–21, 2025-26
- Australian Women's Twenty20 Cup:
  - Winners (1): 2013–14

== See also ==
- Cricket in Queensland
- Queensland Cricket
- Queensland men's cricket team
- Brisbane Heat (WBBL)
