= 2004–05 Women's National Cricket League season =

Cricket tournament

Women's National Cricket League 2004–05 season
- Dates: 30 October 2004 – 13 February 2005
- Administrator: Cricket Australia
- Cricket format: Limited overs cricket (50 overs)
- Tournament format(s): Group stage and finals series
- Champions: Victoria (2nd title)
- Runners-up: New South Wales
- Participants: 5
- Matches: 23
- Player of the series: (South Australia) Karen Rolton
- Most runs: (Victoria (state)) Belinda Clark (397)
- Most wickets: (New South Wales) Julie Hayes (19)
- Official website: cricket.com.au

The 2004–05 Women's National Cricket League season was the ninth season of the Women's National Cricket League, the women's domestic limited overs cricket competition in Australia. The tournament started on 30 October 2004 and finished on 13 February 2005. Victorian Spirit won the tournament for the second time after finishing second on the ladder at the conclusion of the group stage and beating defending champions New South Wales Breakers by two games to one in the finals series.

== Ladder ==
As of 30 January 2005

Pos	Team	Pld	W	L	T	NR	BP	Pts	NRR
1	New South Wales	8	7	1	0	0	4	32	0.728
2	Victoria	8	7	1	0	0	4	32	0.643
3	South Australia	8	3	4	0	1	2	16	0.275
4	Queensland	8	2	5	0	1	1	11	−0.091
5	Western Australia	8	0	8	0	0	0	0	−1.621

Updated to match(es) played on 30 January 2005. Source:
Rules for classification: The top two ranked teams qualified for the finals series.
- Points system: 4 for a win, 2 each for a tie, no result or abandonment and 0 for a loss.
- Bonus point system: 2 for win with a run rate twice that of the opposition, 1 for win with a run rate 1.25 times that of the opposition.

== Fixtures ==
=== 1st final ===
11 February 2005
Scorecard

New South Wales; 3/200 (50 overs)	v	Victoria; 179 (49.1 overs)
Shannon Cunneen 56 (87); Jane Franklin 1/31 (9 overs)		Sarah Elliott 64 (118); Julie Hayes 4/31 (10 overs)

New South Wales won by 21 runs
Bankstown Oval, Sydney
Umpires: Tim Donahoo and Bill Hendricks

- Victoria won the toss and elected to field.

=== 2nd final ===
12 February 2005
Scorecard

New South Wales; 71 (43.4 overs)	v	Victoria; 5/72 (39.1 overs)
Sarah Andrews 19* (37); Clea Smith 4/10 (10 overs)		Kelly Applebee 27* (100); Julie Hayes 2/18 (10 overs)

Victoria won by 5 wickets
Bankstown Oval, Sydney
Umpires: Tim Donahoo and Bill Hendricks

- New South Wales won the toss and elected to bat.

=== 3rd final ===
13 February 2005
Scorecard

Victoria; 6/159 (50 overs)	v	New South Wales; 109 (43.4 overs)
Louise Broadfoot 29* (39); Lisa Sthalekar 2/26 (10 overs)		Alex Blackwell 24 (52); Jane Franklin 3/25 (8.4 overs)

Victoria won by 50 runs
Bankstown Oval, Sydney
Umpires: Tim Donahoo and Bill Hendricks

- New South Wales won the toss and elected to field.
- Victoria won the 2004–05 Women's National Cricket League.

== Statistics ==
=== Highest totals ===
Team	Score	Against	Venue	Date
New South Wales	2/285	Western Australia	North Sydney Oval No 2	31 October 2004
Victoria	5/240	Queensland	Harry Trott Oval, Melbourne	21 November 2004
Victoria	7/236	Western Australia	Settlers Hill, Baldivis	13 November 2004
South Australia	4/226	Western Australia	Adelaide Oval No 2	15 January 2005
New South Wales	5/220	Western Australia	Raby Oval, Campbelltown	30 October 2004

=== Most runs ===
Player	Team	Mat	Inns	NO	Runs	HS	Ave	BF	SR	100	50
Belinda Clark	Victoria	11	11	2	397	107*	44.11	642	61.83	1	2
Mel Jones	Victoria	11	11	2	314	79*	34.88	470	66.80	0	2
Karen Rolton	South Australia	7	6	1	298	125	59.60	416	71.63	1	2
Shannon Cunneen	New South Wales	11	11	0	293	56	26.63	588	49.82	0	2
Sarah Elliott	Victoria	11	11	0	281	90	25.54	540	52.03	0	2

=== Most wickets ===
Player	Team	Mat	Inns	Overs	Mdns	Runs	Wkts	BBI	Ave	SR	4WI
Julie Hayes	New South Wales	11	11	105.5	19	315	19	4/30	16.57	33.4	2
Karen Rolton	South Australia	7	7	53.0	14	131	15	5/7	8.73	21.2	0
Lisa Sthalekar	New South Wales	11	11	99.0	19	303	14	4/32	21.64	42.4	1
Clea Smith	Victoria	11	11	87.3	16	248	13	4/10	19.07	40.3	1
Kirsten Pike	Queensland	7	7	70.0	11	211	12	3/36	17.58	35.0	0
