= 1998–99 Women's National Cricket League season =

Cricket tournament

Women's National Cricket League 1998–99 season
- Dates: 14 November 1998 – 9 January 1999
- Administrator(s): Cricket Australia
- Cricket format: Limited overs cricket (50 overs)
- Tournament format(s): Group stage and finals series
- Champions: New South Wales (3rd title)
- Runners-up: Victoria
- Participants: 5
- Matches: 22
- Player of the series: (New South Wales) Belinda Clark
- Most runs: (South Australia) Karen Rolton (435)
- Most wickets: (Victoria (state)) Cathryn Fitzpatrick (14)
- Official website: cricket.com.au

The 1998–99 Women's National Cricket League season was the third season of the Women's National Cricket League, the women's domestic limited overs cricket competition in Australia. The tournament started on 14 November 1998 and finished on 9 January 1999. Defending champions New South Wales Breakers won the tournament for the third time after topping the ladder at the conclusion of the group stage and beating Victorian Spirit by two games to zero in the finals series.

== Ladder ==
As of 3 January 1999

Pos	Team	Pld	W	L	T	NR	Pts	NRR
1	New South Wales	8	5	1	0	2	36	0.999
2	Victoria	8	6	2	0	0	36	0.745
3	South Australia	8	4	4	0	0	24	0.374
4	Queensland	8	3	3	0	2	24	0.219
5	Western Australia	8	0	8	0	0	0	−2.058

Updated to match(es) played on 3 January 1999. Source:
Rules for classification: The top two ranked teams qualified for the finals series.
- Points system: 6 for a win, 3 each for a tie, no result or abandonment, 0 for a loss.

== Fixtures ==
=== 1st final ===
8 January 1999
Scorecard

New South Wales; 6/153 (50 overs)	v	Victoria; 146 (48.2 overs)
Lisa Keightley 57 (117); Charmaine Mason 2/28 (10 overs)		Julie Savage 36 (56); Terry McGregor 2/9 (10 overs)

New South Wales won by 7 runs
Princes Park, Melbourne

- Victoria won the toss and elected to field.

=== 2nd final ===
9 January 1999
Scorecard

New South Wales; 114 (45 overs)	v	Victoria; 113 (47.3 overs)
Martha Winch 35 (60); Louise Broadfoot 4/27 (10 overs)		Stephanie Theodore 30 (37); Terry McGregor 2/26 (10 overs)

New South Wales won by 1 run
Princes Park, Melbourne

- New South Wales won the toss and elected to bat.
- New South Wales won the 1998–99 Women's National Cricket League.
