= Australia women's cricket team in England and Ireland in 2005 =

Australian women's cricket team in England in 2005
	England	Australia
Captains	Clare Connor	Belinda Clark

Test series
- Result: England won the 2-match series 1–0
Most runs	Arran Brindle (199)	Karen Rolton (185)
Most wickets	Katherine Brunt (14)	Cathryn Fitzpatrick (8)
- Player of the series: Katherine Brunt

One Day International series
- Results: Australia won the 5-match series 3–2
Most runs	Claire Taylor (325)	Lisa Keightley (316)
Most wickets	Clare Connor (8)	Cathryn Fitzpatrick (10)
- Player of the series: Lisa Keightley

Twenty20 International series
- Results: Australia won the 1-match series 1–0
Most runs	Charlotte Edwards (42)	Karen Rolton (96)
Most wickets	Katherine Brunt (3)	Karen Rolton (2)
- Player of the series: Karen Rolton

The Australian women's cricket team toured England in August and September 2005. They played five One-day Internationals (ODIs), two Test matches and one Twenty20 International. They also played one One Day International against Ireland, which they won easily. They won two of the three ODIs, and were also looking to win the third, but a good last over from Katherine Brunt, yielding only four runs, gave England victory. Brunt was also the heroine of the second Test, where she took nine wickets in the match and made 52 in England's first Test win over the Australians since December 1984. It also gave England their first win in the Women's Ashes since 1963. England also won their next ODI thanks to a century from Claire Taylor, but Australia took the series 3–2 after winning the last ODI by just four runs. The last match of the series was a Twenty20 International, which was Australia's first, and they won it by seven wickets.

== ODIs in Ireland ==
Three ODIs in Ireland were planned (29, 31 July and 1 August), but only one was actually played - the other two were rained off. However, in the match that was played on 31 July, Australia beat the Irish women's cricket team by 240 runs, Karen Rolton and Lisa Sthalekar both making centuries as Australia made 295 for 3, and Cecelia Joyce top-scored for Ireland with a paltry 18 - Shelley Nitschke taking four for 15 as Ireland collapsed to 55 all out in 26 overs.

31 July 2005
Scorecard

Australia; 295/3 (50 overs)	v	Ireland; 55 (26 overs)
Karen Rolton 151 (114); Barbara McDonald 2/33 (10 overs)		Cecelia Joyce 18 (43); Shelley Nitschke 4/15 (5 overs)

Australia Women won by 240 runs
YMCA Cricket Club, Dublin
Umpires: Gerry Lyons & Martin Russell

- Ireland Women won the toss and elected to field.

== Matches in England ==
=== Test Series ===
==== 1st Test ====
9–13 August 2005
Scorecard

Australia	v	England
355 (122.2 overs); Karen Rolton 71 (115); Katherine Brunt 3/64 [22.2]		273 (129 overs); Charlotte Edwards 69 (171); Shelley Nitschke 3/59 [30]
223 (86.5 overs); Karen Rolton 97 (175); Clare Connor 4/68 [34.5]		172/7 (95 overs); Arran Brindle 101 (249); Lisa Sthalekar 3/44 [30]

Match drawn
County Ground, Hove
Umpires: Lorraine Elgar & Peter Willey
Player of the match: Karen Rolton (Aus)

- Australia Women won the toss and elected to bat.

England got an excellent start to the first women's Test at Hove, where two debutants were to take centre stage; but the match petered out into a draw.

In one of the highlights of the first day of play, Belinda Clark had been bowled by Jenny Gunn for a two-ball duck. It was to be Gunn's only wicket of the day, but probably the most vital. All-rounder Rosalie Birch and 15-year-old debutante spinner Holly Colvin then took two wickets each as Australia crumbled to 115 for 7, Karen Rolton being the only batter on top of the bowlers.

However, as the day wore on, England lost their stamina, and the lower order batters took over. No. 7 Cathryn Fitzpatrick, No. 9 Julie Hayes and Test debutante No. 10 Shelley Nitschke all made fifties as Australia eked out 223 more runs before the end of the first day, losing only two more wickets, and Nitschke was 70 not out overnight. She finished on an unbeaten 81, as Australia added a further 27 before Clea Smith was lbw to Katherine Brunt, to end with 355. England scored slowly after losing Laura Newton for 24, as they used 129 overs to make 273 – Charlotte Edwards top-scoring with 69, while Arran Brindle made her second Test half-century with 54.

Nitschke and Lisa Sthalekar took three wickets each, but England fought back. Gunn took two more wickets, removing both openers for ducks, as Belinda Clark recorded a pair, but Karen Rolton and Sthalekar took the score beyond England's grasp. Rolton was finally run out for 97, but she had led the Australians to a 254-run lead at the end of day three. Australia added a further 51 to that on the fourth morning - slow left arm bowler Clare Connor taking four for 68 in a marathon bowling effort. England quickly determined 306 in 95 overs was too tough after they crumbled to 14 for 3, but Brindle stood firm at the crease, taking four hours for a maiden Test century, and England made it to the end of the scheduled time having only lost seven wickets. Thus, the second Test would now decide the series.

==== 2nd Test ====
24–27 August 2005
Scorecard

Australia	v	England
131 (60.3 overs); Lisa Sthalekar 34 (74); Katherine Brunt 5/47 [13.3]		289 (125.2 overs); Katherine Brunt 52 (106); Emma Liddell 4/57 [31]
232 (134.5 overs); Shelley Nitschke 88 (231); Katherine Brunt 4/64 [34]		75/4 (28.4 overs); Charlotte Edwards 24 (41); Emma Liddell 2/18 [9]

England Women won by 6 wickets
County Ground, Worcester
Umpires: John Hayes & Richard Illingworth
Player of the match: Katherine Brunt (Eng)

- England Women won the toss and elected to field.

Despite rain washing out parts of the first day at New Road, England took their first Test victory over Australia since December 1984, and their first Ashes series win since 1963. Having won the toss, England captain Clare Connor opted to bowl, and after Belinda Clark had slashed 18 runs she was trapped lbw by pacer Katherine Brunt. Wickets were shared out among the entire England team, no Australian passed 40, and by the end of the day they had crashed to 126 for 7. It took 33 deliveries for Australia to be all out on the second morning - for 131, as the efforts from the last Test, when the last three wickets outscored the rest of the batting line-up, were not repeated. Brunt took care of that, having Nitschke and Price caught behind to complete her five-wicket-haul. Batting was clearly difficult, but Jenny Gunn, Clare Connor and Claire Taylor all dug in to make scores above 30, before a vital partnership between Taylor and Beth Morgan took England to a relatively comfortable lead, as they moved to 196 for 6 before Emma Liddell struck twice and Cathryn Fitzpatrick once to leave England at 222 for 9 at close of play of day two. Liddell and Fitzpatrick bowled 59 overs between them on the second day, out of a total of 101, and although they shared seven wickets, they failed to remove either of Brunt or Isa Guha, and the last English pair added 18 before the end of day two.

On the third day, England powered on, Brunt staking her claim for Player of the Match with a vital, powerful 52 - her first Test fifty - as she eked out 83 runs with Guha for the tenth wicket, Guha making 31 not out. Leading by 158 on first innings, England got a dream start by dismissing Lisa Keightley for a duck, and wickets just kept falling. Gunn and Brunt took two wickets each as the Australians faltered to 18 for 4, before the twin sisters Kate and Alex Blackwell fought back. However, Isa Guha removed Alex, another two wickets fell, and by tea Australia were 67 for 7. An attritional partnership for the seventh wicket between Kate Blackwell and Shelley Nitschke, which yielded 112 runs in four hours, carried Australia past 100, but still they were only 21 ahead with three wickets in hand at the close of day three. The last day started just like England wanted, Katherine Brunt dismissing Kate Blackwell and wicket-keeper Julia Price with successive deliveries, and all that was left was to take the last wicket. England toiled, but the Australians defended for nearly two hours and faced 35 overs, until number 11 Emma Liddell finally edged behind to Jane Smit and was out for 24. Shelley Nitschke made her second fifty in two Tests and was left stranded on 88 not out, while slow left arm bowler Clare Connor ended with the bowling analysis of 26-20-25-1. Brunt finished with four wickets in the second innings, for a match total of nine for 111.

England were thus left to chase 75 for the Ashes, but Emma Liddell did not want to be beaten, and her pace trapped Laura Newton and Jenny Gunn lbw in the second over as England lost their first two wickets for one run. However, Liddell could not make any further breakthroughs, and even though England lost Connor and Edwards to Fitzpatrick - both lbw - Arran Brindle batted out an hour for 24 not out to see England to the target about three hours before the scheduled close.

=== WODI Series ===
==== 1st WODI ====
15 August 2005
Scorecard

Australia; 222/7 (50 overs)	v	England; 210 (49.1 overs)
Lisa Keightley 56 (71); Clare Connor 3/39 [10]		Claire Taylor 57 (84); Cathryn Fitzpatrick 4/19 [10]

Australia Women won by 12 runs
College Ground, Cheltenham
Umpires: Mervyn Kitchen and Annette Owen
Player of the match: Cathryn Fitzpatrick (Aus)

- Australia Women won the toss and elected to bat.

England set themselves up well against Australia, but failed to hit out in the last over thanks to some accurate and fierce bowling from Cathryn Fitzpatrick, who had earlier hit 38 not out with the bat to lift Australia to 222 for 7 after three for 39 from Clare Connor. Arran Brindle continued on her magnificent form from the first Test, when she made a fifty and a hundred, and in partnerships with Jenny Gunn and Claire Taylor she lifted the English to 198 for 4 with her score of 81. With only 25 runs left to hit for the last six wickets, it was there for the taking. But Fitzpatrick returned, having taken the wicket of Laura Newton earlier on, and she took three more wickets as the English lower order were strangled - and collapsed to 210 all out with five balls remaining in the innings. Fitzpatrick ended with figures of four for 19 from 10 overs, and Emma Liddell also took three for 29.

==== 2nd WODI ====
19 August
Scorecard

Australia; 193/8 (50 overs)	v	England; 123 (38.4 overs)
Lisa Keightley 58 (94); Isa Guha 3/24 [10]		Claire Taylor 48 (63); Shelley Nitschke 7/24 [7.4]

Australia Women won by 70 runs
Chester Road North Ground, Kidderminster
Umpires: John Holder & Ann Roberts
Player of the match: Shelley Nitschke (Aus)

- England Women won the toss and elected to field.

Slow left arm bowler Shelley Nitschke bowled Australia to a win and a 2–0 series lead in the second match of the ODI series, after good bowling from the English women had limited Australia to 193 for 8 in 50 overs. Kate Blackwell and Lisa Keightley both made fifties for Australia, while Belinda Clark continued her poor run of form - two ducks in the Tests and 16 in the first ODI was followed up with a 45-ball 10 today. England wicket-keeper Claire Taylor made three stumpings, two off medium pace bowler Isa Guha. England's reply started well, with Laura Newton and Claire Taylor making their way to 80 for 1 after Charlotte Edwards had been dismissed initially, but the English bowler just couldn't play the spin of Nitschke, who recorded a career-best analysis of 7 for 24, despite six wides. Only Newton and Taylor passed 10, while Arran Brindle's good form (with 236 runs in three innings so far in the series) came to a halt as she was bowled by Nitschke for a golden duck. England's final score was 128 all out, with more than 10 overs potentially remaining in the innings.

==== 3rd WODI ====
21 August
Scorecard

England; 200/7 (50 overs)	v	Australia; 198/7 (50 overs)
Claire Taylor 82 (122); Lisa Sthalekar 1/12 [4]		Lisa Keightley 66 (106); Jenny Gunn 2/27 [10]

England Women won by 2 runs
Stratford-upon-Avon Cricket Club Ground, Stratford-upon-Avon
Umpires: Peter Hartley & Annette Owen
Player of the match: Claire Taylor (Eng)

- Australia Women won the toss and elected to field.

England needed a victory to keep the five-match One-day International series alive, and with Australia needing six runs off the last over, it looked like the Australians would secure the series with two matches to spare. However, Katherine Brunt had the last say, as she first had Cathryn Fitzpatrick stumped and then helped to run out Julie Hayes for a duck. Suddenly, Australia needed four from the last ball to win, and they could only get one, as England went into scenes of jubilation - having secured their first victory over the Australian women since 1993. Earlier, Claire Taylor had lifted England to 200 for 7 with her 82, taking on Fitzpatrick who conceded 61 runs in her 10 overs. All the six Australian bowlers got one wicket, however, with the seventh being a run out. Australia's opener Belinda Clark recorded another poor score with a six-ball duck, and Australia continued to lose wickets at regular intervals. Yet, at 195 for 5 with an over to spare, the wise money would normally have been on the tourists, but thanks to Brunt, it went England's way instead.

==== 4th WODI ====
England won by four wickets

England, buoyed by having won their first Ashes Test series in 42 years, tied the series at 2–2 with a victory at The County Ground, Taunton. Australia, however, made a good start with Lisa Keightley and Karen Rolton making fifties to propel the team to 142 for 1. Two quick wickets from Clare Connor slowed them down, however, and they finished with a total on 215 for 5. Chasing that total, England lost Charlotte Edwards for 1 in the second over, but Laura Newton and Claire Taylor put them back with a 65-run partnership. Spinner Lisa Sthalekar then took two quick wickets, and England were set back to 79 for 3 after 19.3 overs. Despite two maiden overs from left-arm bowler Karen Rolton, Taylor kept hitting boundaries, ending with 116 before finally letting a ball from Cathryn Fitzpatrick onto her stumps - bowled for 116. By that time, though, she had made the first century of the series, and England only needed five more runs to win. Lydia Greenway and Jane Smit carried England over the target with nine balls to spare, setting up the fifth and final match, also at Taunton, to be a series decider. (Cricinfo scorecard)

==== 5th WODI ====
Australia won by four runs

England's run of victories - with three, their longest successive streak of wins over Australia - came to an end at The County Ground, Taunton as Australia recorded their first win in four matches against the English. It was another close bout, with the match result uncertain until the very last over. Australia batted first, and made 260 for 6, with Lisa Keightley, Karen Rolton and Lisa Sthalekar all making fifties, and Belinda Clark recording her highest score of the tour with 36. Leg-spinner Charlotte Edwards took three for 47 to set Australia back somewhat in the late overs, however.

When England batted, Edwards shared an opening partnership of 94 with Laura Newton, and both made half-centuries as England paced themselves well, keeping the required run rate just around six per over. However, fast bowler Cathryn Fitzpatrick took four wickets to trouble the English middle order, having Arran Brindle bowled for 50 to see England to 240 for 6. England only needed 20 for the last four wickets, and with England's captain Clare Connor hitting a couple of fours after being forced down the order, England needed six off the last over to win with one wicket in hand - having suffered two run outs as well. Isa Guha hit the first ball for a single, bringing Connor on strike with five needed. However, Kirsten Pike held a catch off Connor's top-edge, and England were all out for 256, five short of their first ODI series victory over Australia since 1976. (Cricinfo scorecard)

=== Women's Twenty20 International: England v Australia (2 September) ===
Australia won by seven wickets

Cathryn Fitzpatrick, playing her last international match in England, combined with Karen Rolton to be the main reasons for Australia a comfortable victory in the second women's Twenty20 international of all time. England batted first, and Charlotte Edwards and Laura Newton added 77 for the first wicket, but when Newton and Edwards departed England began to struggle. Fitzpatrick's economical bowling yielded only 14 runs from four overs, including a maiden over to Rosalie Birch (who made one run off seven balls in the last three balls). Some boundaries in the late overs from Clare Connor and Katherine Brunt, however, saw England to a total of 151 for 7.

Brunt then took three early wickets for England as Australia faltered to six runs for three wickets, and England's hopes were increasing. No one could support Brunt with the ball, however, and Karen Rolton slashed 16 fours and one six in an unbeaten 96 to guide Australia home with fourteen deliveries remaining. Kate Blackwell supported her well, making 43, and no one except Brunt could keep the run rate below 8 an over. (Cricinfo scorecard)
