= Fiona McDonald (cricketer) =

Australian cricketer (born 1987)

Personal information
- Full name: Fiona Joy McDonald
- Born: 22 July 1987 (age 39); Adelaide, South Australia
- Batting: Right-handed
- Bowling: Right-arm fast-medium

Domestic team information
- Years: Team
- 2004/05–2010/11: South Australia

Career statistics
Competition	WLA	WT20
Matches	35	15
Runs scored	256	12
Batting average	13.47	1.71
100s/50s	0/0	0/0
Top score	37	8*
Balls bowled	189	24
Wickets	7	1
Bowling average	20.71	31.00
5 wickets in innings	0	–
10 wickets in match	0	–
Best bowling	4/56	–
Catches/stumpings	11/–	4/–
- Source: CricketArchive, 9 July 2021

Fiona Joy McDonald (born 22 July 1987) is a former Australian cricketer. A right-handed batter and right-arm fast-medium bowler, she played 35 List A matches for South Australia in the Women's National Cricket League (WNCL) between the 2004–05 and 2010–11 seasons. She also made 15 appearances for South Australia in the Australian Women's Twenty20 Cup.
