= 2009–10 Women's National Cricket League season =

Cricket tournament

Women's National Cricket League 2009–10 season
- Dates: 31 October 2009 – 30 January 2010
- Administrator: Cricket Australia
- Cricket format: Limited overs cricket (50 overs)
- Tournament format(s): Group stage and final
- Champions: New South Wales (12th title)
- Runners-up: Victoria
- Participants: 6
- Matches: 31
- Player of the series: (Victoria (state)) Sarah Elliott
- Most runs: (South Australia) Karen Rolton (498)
- Most wickets: (New South Wales) Ellyse Perry (22)
- Official website: cricket.com.au

The 2009–10 Women's National Cricket League season was the 14th season of the Women's National Cricket League, the women's domestic limited overs cricket competition in Australia. The tournament started on 31 October 2009 and finished on 30 January 2010. The season saw the addition of the ACT Meteors, taking the number of teams up to six. Defending champions New South Wales Breakers won the tournament for the 12th time after finishing second on the ladder at the conclusion of the group stage and beating Victorian Spirit in the final.

== Ladder ==
As of 18 January 2010

Pos	Team	Pld	W	L	T	NR	BP	Pts	NRR
1	Victoria	10	8	1	0	1	7	41	1.177
2	New South Wales	10	8	2	0	0	8	40	1.257
3	Australian Capital Territory	10	4	6	0	0	2	18	−0.362
4	Western Australia	10	4	6	0	0	2	18	−0.852
5	Queensland	10	3	6	0	1	4	18	0.116
6	South Australia	10	2	8	0	0	0	8	−1.204

Updated to match(es) played on 18 January 2010. Source:
Rules for classification: The top two ranked teams qualified for the final.
- Points system: 4 for a win, 2 each for a tie or a no result, 0 for a loss, 1 each for an abandoned match.
- Bonus point system: 2 for win with a run rate twice that of the opposition, 1 for win with a run rate 1.25 times that of the opposition.

== Fixtures ==
=== Final ===
30 January 2010
Scorecard

New South Wales; 9/206 (50 overs)	v	Victoria; 147 (39.1 overs)
Alex Blackwell 54 (92); Sarah Elliott 2/28 (10 overs)		Kelly Applebee 35 (49); Erin Osborne 3/33 (9 overs)

New South Wales won by 59 runs
Melbourne Cricket Ground
Umpires: Ashley Barrow and Geoff Joshua

- New South Wales won the toss and elected to field.
- New South Wales won the 2012–13 Women's National Cricket League.

== Statistics ==
=== Highest totals ===
Team	Score	Against	Venue	Date
Australian Capital Territory	3/309	South Australia	Manuka Oval, Canberra	1 November 2009
New South Wales	3/303	Western Australia	James Oval, Perth	8 January 2010
Victoria	6/302	Western Australia	WACA Ground, Perth	31 October 2009
South Australia	3/301	Australian Capital Territory	Manuka Oval, Canberra	31 October 2009
Victoria	3/295	South Australia	Adelaide Oval	9 January 2010

=== Most runs ===
Player	Team	Mat	Inns	NO	Runs	HS	Ave	BF	SR	100	50
Karen Rolton	South Australia	10	10	0	498	129	49.80	601	82.86	1	4
Alex Blackwell	New South Wales	11	10	2	489	138	61.12	612	79.90	2	2
Shelley Nitschke	South Australia	10	10	1	486	119*	54.00	610	79.67	2	3
Melissa Bulow	Queensland	9	9	1	481	130	60.12	670	71.79	2	2
Rachael Haynes	Victoria	10	10	0	397	126	39.70	642	61.83	1	1

=== Most wickets ===
Player	Team	Mat	Inns	Overs	Mdns	Runs	Wkts	BBI	Ave	SR	4WI
Ellyse Perry	New South Wales	9	9	71.0	7	234	22	5/19	10.63	19.3	2
Kristen Beams	Victoria	9	9	85.3	14	308	21	4/25	14.66	24.4	2
Kirsten Pike	Queensland	9	9	87.0	16	267	19	4/15	14.05	27.4	2
Rene Farrell	Western Australia	10	10	87.1	4	386	18	5/57	21.44	29.0	2
Erin Osborne	New South Wales	11	10	87.0	4	274	17	3/23	16.11	30.7	0
