= 1999–2000 Women's National Cricket League season =

Cricket tournament

Women's National Cricket League 1999–2000 season
- Dates: 30 October 1999 – 18 December 1999
- Administrator(s): Cricket Australia
- Cricket format: Limited overs cricket (50 overs)
- Tournament format(s): Group stage and finals series
- Champions: New South Wales (4th title)
- Runners-up: Western Australia
- Participants: 5
- Matches: 22
- Player of the series: (New South Wales) Lisa Keightley
- Most runs: (New South Wales) Lisa Keightley (406)
- Most wickets: (New South Wales) Lisa Sthalekar (15)
- Official website: cricket.com.au

The 1999–2000 Women's National Cricket League season was the fourth season of the Women's National Cricket League, the women's domestic limited overs cricket competition in Australia. The tournament started on 30 October 1999 and finished on 18 December 1999. Defending champions New South Wales Breakers won the tournament for the fourth time after topping the ladder at the conclusion of the group stage and beating Western Fury by two games to zero in the finals series.

== Ladder ==
As of 12 December 1999

Pos	Team	Pld	W	L	T	NR	Pts	NRR
1	New South Wales	8	7	1	0	0	42	0.821
2	Western Australia	8	5	3	0	0	30	0.417
3	Victoria	8	5	3	0	0	30	0.273
4	Queensland	8	2	6	0	0	12	−0.775
5	South Australia	8	1	7	0	0	6	−0.725

Updated to match(es) played on 12 December 1999. Source:
Rules for classification: The top two ranked teams qualified for the finals series.
- Points system: 6 for a win, 3 each for a tie, no result or abandonment, 0 for a loss.

== Fixtures ==
=== 1st final ===
17 December 1999
Scorecard

New South Wales; 4/154 (30 overs)	v	Western Australia; 135 (29.4 overs)
Michelle Goszko 62 (78); Diane Brown 2/21 (6 overs)		Cherie Bambury 45 (48); Terry McGregor 4/21 (5.4 overs)

New South Wales won by 19 runs
Sydney Cricket Ground
Umpires: DL Eldridge and Ron Furtner

- Western Australia won the toss and elected to field.
- Rain reduced the match to 30 overs per side

=== 2nd final ===
18 December 1999
Scorecard

Western Australia; 7/218 (50 overs)	v	New South Wales; 7/219 (50 overs)
Elwyn Campbell 65 (111); Emma Liddell 2/46 (7 overs)		Martha Winch 67 (77); Emma Murphy 3/41 (9 overs)

New South Wales won by 3 wickets
Sydney Cricket Ground

- Western Australia won the toss and elected to bat.
- New South Wales won the 1999–2000 Women's National Cricket League.
