= 2001–02 Women's National Cricket League season =

Cricket tournament

Women's National Cricket League 2001–02 season
- Dates: 3 November 2001 – 3 February 2002
- Administrator(s): Cricket Australia
- Cricket format: Limited overs cricket (50 overs)
- Tournament format(s): Group stage and finals series
- Champions: New South Wales (6th title)
- Runners-up: Victoria
- Participants: 5
- Matches: 22
- Player of the series: (South Australia) Karen Rolton
- Most runs: (South Australia) Karen Rolton (509)
- Most wickets: (New South Wales) Bronwyn Calver (18)
- Official website: cricket.com.au

The 2001–02 Women's National Cricket League season was the sixth season of the Women's National Cricket League, the women's domestic limited overs cricket competition in Australia. The tournament started on 3 November 2001 and finished on 3 February 2002. Defending champions New South Wales Breakers won the tournament for the sixth time after topping the ladder at the conclusion of the group stage and beating Victorian Spirit by two games to zero in the finals series.

== Ladder ==
As of 20 January 2002

Pos	Team	Pld	W	L	T	NR	Pts	NRR
1	New South Wales	8	8	0	0	0	48	0.944
2	Victoria	8	5	3	0	0	30	0.342
3	South Australia	8	4	4	0	0	24	−0.542
4	Queensland	8	3	5	0	0	18	0.192
5	Western Australia	8	0	8	0	0	0	−0.974

Updated to match(es) played on 20 January 2002. Source:
Rules for classification: The top two ranked teams qualified for the finals series.
- Points system: 6 for a win, 3 each for a tie, no result or abandonment, 0 for a loss.

== Fixtures ==
=== 1st final ===
2 February 2002
Scorecard

Victoria; 133 (50 overs)	v	New South Wales; 3/134 (42 overs)
Louise Broadfoot 41 (88); Bronwyn Calver 3/23 (9 overs)		Lisa Sthalekar 31 (81); Louise Broadfoot 1/9 (4 overs)

New South Wales won by 7 wickets
Bankstown Oval, Sydney
Umpires: Ron Furtner and Bill Hendricks

- New South Wales won the toss and elected to field.

=== 2nd final ===
3 February 2002
Scorecard

Victoria; 9/186 (50 overs)	v	New South Wales; 6/187 (49.4 overs)
Mel Jones 77 (100); Terry McGregor 3/40 (10 overs)		Lisa Sthalekar 68 (128); Jodie Dean 2/23 (10 overs)

New South Wales won by 4 wickets
Bankstown Oval, Sydney
Umpires: Ron Furtner and Bill Hendricks

- New South Wales won the toss and elected to field.
- New South Wales won the 2001–02 Women's National Cricket League.
