= 2012–13 Women's National Cricket League season =

Cricket tournament

Women's National Cricket League 2012–13 season
- Dates: 13 October 2012 – 13 January 2013
- Administrator: Cricket Australia
- Cricket format: Limited overs cricket (50 overs)
- Tournament format(s): Round-robin and knockout
- Champions: New South Wales (15th title)
- Runners-up: Queensland
- Participants: 7
- Matches: 25
- Player of the series: (Western Australia) Nicole Bolton (Victoria (state)) Meg Lanning
- Most runs: (Victoria (state)) Meg Lanning (509)
- Most wickets: (Queensland) Jude Coleman (18)
- Official website: cricket.com.au

The 2012–13 Women's National Cricket League season was the 17th season of the Women's National Cricket League, the women's domestic limited overs cricket competition in Australia. The tournament started on 13 October 2012 and finished on 13 January 2013. For the first time, the tournament included semi-finals, with the top four teams on the ladder advancing. This was repeated on one further occasion, in 2014–15. Defending champions New South Wales Breakers won the tournament for the 15th time after topping the ladder at the end of the group stage and beating Queensland Fire in the final.

== Ladder ==
As of 6 January 2013

Pos	Team	Pld	W	L	T	NR	BP	Pts	NRR
1	New South Wales	6	5	1	0	0	4.5	24.5	1.589
2	Queensland	6	5	1	0	0	4	24	0.908
3	Victoria	6	4	2	0	0	4	20	0.999
4	Western Australia	6	3	3	0	0	3	15	−0.039
5	Australian Capital Territory	6	3	3	0	0	1	13	0.016
6	South Australia	6	1	5	0	0	0	4	−1.849
7	Tasmania	6	0	6	0	0	0	0	−1.590

Updated to match(es) played on 6 January 2013. Source:
Rules for classification: The top four ranked teams qualified for the semi-finals.
- Points system: 4 for a win, 2 each for a tie or a no result, 0 for a loss, 1 each for an abandoned match.
- Bonus point system: 2 for win with a run rate twice that of the opposition, 1 for win with a run rate 1.25 times that of the opposition.

== Fixtures ==
=== Round-robin phase ===
Match 1
13 October 2012
Scorecard

(home team) Queensland	v	South Australia

Allan Border Field, Brisbane

Match 2
13 October 2012
Scorecard

(home team) Western Australia	v	Tasmania

WACA Ground, Perth

Match 3
20 October 2012
Scorecard

Australian Capital Territory	v	New South Wales (home team)

Blacktown Olympic Park Oval, Sydney

Match 4
27 October 2012
Scorecard

(home team) Queensland	v	New South Wales

Allan Border Field, Brisbane

Match 5
27 October 2012
Scorecard

(home team) South Australia	v	Australian Capital Territory

Park 25, Adelaide

Match 6
27 October 2012
Scorecard

(home team) Victoria	v	Western Australia

Casey Fields No 4, Melbourne

Match 7
10 November 2012
Scorecard

Victoria	v	Australian Capital Territory (home team)

Manuka Oval, Canberra

Match 8
10 November 2012
Scorecard

(home team) South Australia	v	Tasmania

Park 25, Adelaide

Match 9
10 November 2012
Scorecard

Queensland	v	Western Australia (home team)

WACA Ground, Perth

Match 10
24 November 2012
Scorecard

(home team) New South Wales	v	Western Australia

Blacktown Olympic Park Oval, Sydney

Match 11
24 November 2013
Scorecard

Australian Capital Territory	v	Tasmania (home team)

NWTCA Ground, Burnie

Match 12
24 November 2012
Scorecard

(home team) Victoria	v	South Australia

Camberwell Sports Ground, Melbourne

Match 13
7 December 2012
Scorecard

Tasmania	v	New South Wales (home team)

Blacktown Olympic Park Oval, Sydney

Match 14
8 December 2012
Scorecard

Victoria	v	Queensland (home team)

Allan Border Field, Brisbane

Match 15
8 December 2012
Scorecard

(home team) Western Australia	v	South Australia

Christ Church Grammar School Playing Fields, Perth

Match 16
21 December 2012
Scorecard

(home team) Tasmania	v	Victoria

Bellerive Oval, Hobart

Match 17
22 December 2012
Scorecard

(home team) Australian Capital Territory	v	Queensland

Freebody Oval, Queanbeyan

Match 18
22 December 2012
Scorecard

New South Wales	v	South Australia

Prospect Oval, Adelaide

Match 19
5 January 2013
Scorecard

Western Australia	v	Australian Capital Territory (home team)

Manuka Oval, Canberra

Match 20
5 January 2013
Scorecard

New South Wales	v	Victoria (home team)

Junction Oval, Melbourne

Match 21
6 January 2013
Scorecard

(home team) Tasmania	v	Queensland

Bellerive Oval, Hobart

== Knockout stage ==
=== Overview ===
Semifinals
1	New South Wales	5/331
4	Western Australia	8/221
2	Queensland	3/210
3	Victoria	209

Finals
1	New South Wales	4/135 (D/L)
2	Queensland	7/232
Third place
3	Victoria	5/208
4	Western Australia	9/207

=== Semi-final 1 ===
11 January 2013
Scorecard

New South Wales; 5/331 (50 overs)	v	Western Australia; 8/221 (50 overs)
Alex Blackwell 135* (110); Nicky Shaw 2/48 (8 overs)		Jenny Wallace 96 (127); Ellyse Perry 2/25 (5 overs)

New South Wales won by 110 runs
Blacktown International Sportspark, Sydney
Umpires: Andrew Hamilton and Tony Ward

- New South Wales won the toss and elected to bat.
- New South Wales advanced to the final

=== Semi-final 2 ===
11 January 2013
Scorecard

Victoria; 9/209 (48 overs)	v	Queensland; 3/210 (36.4 overs)
Kelly Applebee 71 (97); Jude Coleman 3/25 (9 overs)		Melissa Bulow 64 (71); Molly Strano 1/38 (8.2 overs)

Queensland won by 7 wickets (with 80 balls remaining)
Blacktown Olympic Park No 2 Oval, Sydney
Umpires: David Taylor and Damien Mealey

- Victoria won the toss and elected to bat.
- Queensland advanced to the final

=== 3rd-place play-off ===
12 January 2013
Scorecard

Western Australia; 9/207 (50 overs)	v	Victoria; 5/208 (40.2 overs)
Suzie Bates 63 (67); Molly Strano 3/43 (10 overs)		Meg Lanning 94 (81); Emma Biss 2/28 (8.2 overs)

Victoria won by 5 wickets (with 58 balls remaining)
Blacktown International Sportspark, Sydney
Umpires: Andrew Hamilton and David Taylor

- Western Australia won the toss and elected to bat.

=== Final ===
13 January 2013
Scorecard

Queensland; 7/232 (50 overs)	v	New South Wales; 4/135 (27 overs)
Jodie Fields 102* (122); Angela Reakes 2/23 (5 overs)		Alex Blackwell 42* (63); Delissa Kimmince 2/16 (5 overs)

New South Wales won by 15 runs (D/L method)
Sydney Cricket Ground
Umpires: Damien Mealey and Tony Ward

- New South Wales won the toss and elected to field.
- New South Wales won the 2012–13 Women's National Cricket League.

== Statistics ==
=== Highest totals ===
Team	Score	Against	Venue	Date
Victoria	3/418	South Australia	Camberwell Sports Ground, Melbourne	24 November 2012
New South Wales	5/331	Western Australia	Blacktown International Sportspark, Sydney	11 January 2013
New South Wales	3/312	Western Australia	Blacktown International Sportspark, Sydney	24 November 2012
Victoria	8/286	Australian Capital Territory	Manuka Oval, Canberra	10 November 2012
Australian Capital Territory	8/277	Tasmania	North West Tasmania Cricket Association Ground, Burnie	24 November 2012

=== Most runs ===
Player	Team	Mat	Inns	NO	Runs	HS	Ave	BF	SR	100	50
Meg Lanning	Victoria	8	8	0	509	175	63.62	487	104.51	1	4
Alex Blackwell	New South Wales	8	8	3	464	135*	92.80	519	89.40	2	3
Jodie Fields	Queensland	8	8	4	399	102*	99.75	482	82.78	1	3
Nicole Bolton	Western Australia	8	8	0	363	121	45.37	463	78.40	2	1
Jenny Wallace	Western Australia	8	8	1	351	96	50.14	579	60.62	0	4

=== Most wickets ===
Player	Team	Mat	Inns	Overs	Mdns	Runs	Wkts	BBI	Ave	SR	4WI
Jude Coleman	Queensland	8	8	63.1	9	215	18	4/19	11.94	20.5	2
Molly Strano	Victoria	8	8	72.2	7	333	15	4/45	22.20	28.9	1
Jemma Barsby	Queensland	7	7	50.0	2	212	13	3/43	16.30	23.0	0
Angela Reakes	New South Wales	8	8	44.0	5	167	12	4/10	13.91	22.0	1
Sally Moylan	Australian Capital Territory	6	6	46.3	4	199	10	4/30	19.90	27.9	1
