= Danielle Hollis =

Australian cricketer (born 1985)

Personal information
- Full name: Danielle Lee Hollis
- Born: 10 May 1985 (age 41); Tamworth, New South Wales, Australia
- Batting: Right-handed
- Bowling: Right-arm medium
- Role: Batter

Domestic team information
- Years: Team
- 2004/05–2014/15: Queensland

Career statistics
Competition	WLA	WT20
Matches	47	40
Runs scored	598	184
Batting average	16.61	8.00
100s/50s	0/3	0/0
Top score	70	33
Catches/stumpings	19/–	11/–
- Source: CricketArchive, 4 July 2021

Danielle Lee Hollis (born 10 May 1985) is a former Australian cricketer who is a right-handed batter. Born in Tamworth, New South Wales, she represented Queensland in 47 List A matches in the Women's National Cricket League (WNCL) between the 2004–05 and 2014–15 seasons. She also made 40 appearances for Queensland in the Australian Women's Twenty20 Cup.
