= Jess Weidenhofer =

Australian cricketer (born 1988)

Personal information
- Full name: Jessica Weidenhofer
- Born: 7 April 1988 (age 38)
- Batting: Right-handed
- Bowling: Right-arm medium

Domestic team information
- Years: Team
- 2004/05: South Australia

Career statistics
Competition	WLA
Matches	5
Runs scored	7
Batting average	7.00
100s/50s	0/0
Top score	5*
Catches/stumpings	0/–
- Source: CricketArchive, 29 June 2021

Jessica Weidenhofer (born 7 April 1988) is a former Australian cricketer who is a right-handed batter and right-arm medium bowler. She played five List A matches for South Australia during the 2004–05 season of the Women's National Cricket League (WNCL).
