= 2005–06 Women's National Cricket League season =

Cricket tournament

Women's National Cricket League 2005–06 season
- Dates: 5 November 2005 – 5 February 2006
- Administrator: Cricket Australia
- Cricket format: Limited overs cricket (50 overs)
- Tournament format(s): Group stage and finals series
- Champions: New South Wales (8th title)
- Runners-up: Queensland
- Participants: 5
- Matches: 23
- Player of the series: (South Australia) Karen Rolton
- Most runs: (South Australia) Karen Rolton (553)
- Most wickets: (New South Wales) Emma Liddell (19)
- Official website: cricket.com.au

The 2005–06 Women's National Cricket League season was the 10th season of the Women's National Cricket League, the women's domestic limited overs cricket competition in Australia. The tournament started on 5 November 2005 and finished on 5 February 2006. Defending champions Victorian Spirit finished fourth after winning only two games. New South Wales Breakers won the tournament for the eighth time after topping the ladder at the conclusion of the group stage and beating Queensland Fire by two games to one in the finals series.

== Ladder ==
As of 22 January 2006

Pos	Team	Pld	W	L	T	NR	BP	Pts	NRR
1	New South Wales	8	7	1	0	0	5	33	1.090
2	Queensland	8	5	3	0	0	3	23	0.116
3	South Australia	8	5	3	0	0	1	21	0.018
4	Victoria	8	2	6	0	0	1	9	−0.298
5	Western Australia	8	1	7	0	0	0	4	−0.912

Updated to match(es) played on 22 January 2006. Source:
Rules for classification: The top two ranked teams qualified for the final.
- Points system: 4 for a win, 2 each for a tie or a no result, 0 for a loss, 1 each for an abandoned match.
- Bonus point system: 2 for win with a run rate twice that of the opposition, 1 for win with a run rate 1.25 times that of the opposition.

== Fixtures ==
=== 1st final ===
3 February 2006
Scorecard

Queensland; 174 (48 overs)	v	New South Wales; 2/175 (37.4 overs)
Kasee Marxsen 72 (113); Sarah Andrews 3/35 (10 overs)		Leah Poulton 70* (126); Angela Murnane 1/10 (2.4 overs)

New South Wales won by 8 wickets
North Sydney Oval, Sydney
Umpires: Tim Donahoo and Bill Hendricks

- Queensland won the toss and elected to bat.

=== 2nd final ===
4 February 2006
Scorecard

New South Wales; 154 (50 overs)	v	Queensland; 7/155 (35.1 overs)
Lisa Sthalekar 53 (95); Jude Coleman 5/26 (9 overs)		Jodie Fields 61* (108); Emma Liddell 2/40 (8 overs)

Queensland won by 3 wickets
North Sydney Oval, Sydney
Umpires: Tim Donahoo and Bill Hendricks

- Queensland won the toss and elected to field.

=== 3rd final ===
5 February 2006
Scorecard

New South Wales; 146 (48.4 overs)	v	Queensland; 144 (47.2 overs)
Lisa Sthalekar 39 (91); Jude Coleman 4/28 (8.4 overs)		Jodie Fields 37 (86); Charlotte Anneveld 4/29 (6 overs)

New South Wales won by 2 runs
North Sydney Oval, Sydney
Umpires: Tim Donahoo and Bill Hendricks

- New South Wales won the toss and elected to bat.
- New South Wales won the 2005–06 Women's National Cricket League.

== Statistics ==
=== Highest totals ===
Team	Score	Against	Venue	Date
New South Wales	9/289	Western Australia	WACA Ground, Perth	20 November 2005
Queensland	5/254	South Australia	Adelaide Oval No 2	6 November 2005
South Australia	3/251	New South Wales	Newcastle Number 1 Sports Ground	18 December 2005
New South Wales	7/248	South Australia	Newcastle Number 1 Sports Ground	18 December 2005
South Australia	8/247	Queensland	Adelaide Oval No 2	6 November 2005

=== Most runs ===
Player	Team	Mat	Inns	NO	Runs	HS	Ave	BF	SR	100	50
Karen Rolton	South Australia	8	8	2	553	151	92.16	658	84.04	2	4
Melissa Bulow	Queensland	11	11	0	454	123	41.27	593	76.55	2	1
Alex Blackwell	New South Wales	11	11	0	422	130	38.36	668	63.17	1	3
Kate Blackwell	New South Wales	11	10	4	327	102	54.50	396	82.57	1	3
Leah Poulton	New South Wales	11	11	1	325	70*	32.50	564	57.62	0	3

=== Most wickets ===
Player	Team	Mat	Inns	Overs	Mdns	Runs	Wkts	BBI	Ave	SR	4WI
Emma Liddell	New South Wales	11	11	96.3	8	343	19	4/35	18.05	30.4	1
Jude Coleman	Queensland	11	11	86.4	6	332	18	5/26	18.44	28.8	1
Sarah Andrews	New South Wales	11	11	86.2	14	301	16	5/16	18.81	32.3	0
Belinda Matheson	Queensland	11	11	100.0	11	362	15	3/10	24.13	40.0	0
Lisa Sthalekar	New South Wales	11	11	104.0	19	293	14	3/15	20.92	44.5	0
