= Amelie Hunter =

Australian cricketer (born 1980)

Personal information
- Born: 23 February 1980 (age 46)
- Batting: Right-handed
- Role: Wicket-keeper

Domestic team information
- Years: Team
- 2002/03–2005/06: Victoria

Career statistics
Competition	WLA
Matches	30
Runs scored	8
Batting average	8.00
100s/50s	0/0
Top score	7*
Catches/stumpings	17/12
- Source: CricketArchive, 1 July 2021

Amelie Hunter (born 23 February 1980) is a former Australian cricketer. A wicket-keeper and right-handed lower order batter, she played 30 List A matches for Victoria in the Women's National Cricket League (WNCL) between 2002–03 and 2005–06. As Victoria's wicket-keeper, she took 17 catches and 12 stumpings during her time in the WNCL.
