= 2006–07 Women's National Cricket League season =

Cricket tournament

Women's National Cricket League 2006–07 season
- Dates: 11 November 2006 – 28 January 2007
- Administrator: Cricket Australia
- Cricket format: Limited overs cricket (50 overs)
- Tournament format(s): Group stage and finals series
- Champions: New South Wales (9th title)
- Runners-up: Victoria
- Participants: 5
- Matches: 23
- Player of the series: (Queensland) Melissa Bulow
- Most runs: (New South Wales) Kate Blackwell (363)
- Most wickets: (Victoria (state)) Cathryn Fitzpatrick (25)
- Official website: cricket.com.au

The 2006–07 Women's National Cricket League season was the 11th season of the Women's National Cricket League, the women's domestic limited overs cricket competition in Australia. The tournament started on 11 November 2006 and finished on 28 January 2007. Defending champions New South Wales Breakers won the tournament for the ninth time after finishing second on the ladder at the conclusion of the group stage and beating Victorian Spirit by two games to one in the finals series.

== Ladder ==
As of 14 January 2007

Pos	Team	Pld	W	L	T	NR	BP	Pts	NRR
1	Victoria	8	6	2	0	0	4	28	0.482
2	New South Wales	8	5	3	0	0	5	25	0.574
3	Queensland	8	5	3	0	0	3	23	0.633
4	South Australia	8	3	4	0	1	2	16	−0.422
5	Western Australia	8	0	7	0	1	2	4	−1.631

Updated to match(es) played on 14 January 2007. Source:
Rules for classification: The top two ranked teams qualified for the final.
- Points system: 4 for a win, 2 each for a tie or a no result, 0 for a loss, 1 each for an abandoned match.
- Bonus point system: 2 for win with a run rate twice that of the opposition, 1 for win with a run rate 1.25 times that of the opposition.

== Fixtures ==
=== 1st final ===
26 January 2007
Scorecard

Victoria; 136 (46.4 overs)	v	New South Wales; 9/137 (48.4 overs)
Jess Cameron 28 (46); Charlotte Anneveld 3/10 (6.4 overs)		Kate Blackwell 41 (93); Cathryn Fitzpatrick 4/29 (10 overs)

New South Wales won by 1 wicket
Central Reserve, Melbourne
Umpires: Geoff Joshua and Tony Ward

- New South Wales won the toss and elected to field.

=== 2nd final ===
27 January 2007
Scorecard

New South Wales; 144 (49 overs)	v	Victoria; 2/146 (43.2 overs)
Leah Poulton 39 (94); Cathryn Fitzpatrick 6/22 (10 overs)		Rachael Haynes 83* (124); Rene Farrell 1/23 (8.2 overs)

Victoria won by 8 wickets
Central Reserve, Melbourne
Umpires: Geoff Joshua and Tony Ward

- New South Wales won the toss and elected to bat.

=== 3rd final ===
28 January 2007
Scorecard

Victoria; 7/205 (50 overs)	v	New South Wales; 7/206 (48.4 overs)
Mel Jones 39 (95); Charlotte Anneveld 2/19 (8 overs)		Lisa Sthalekar 83 (98); Clea Smith 3/25 (10 overs)

New South Wales won by 3 wickets
Central Reserve, Melbourne
Umpires: Geoff Joshua and Tony Ward

- Victoria won the toss and elected to bat.
- New South Wales won the 2006–07 Women's National Cricket League.

== Statistics ==
=== Highest totals ===
Team	Score	Against	Venue	Date
Queensland	4/265	New South Wales	Allan Border Field	2 December 2006
Queensland	8/239	Western Australia	WACA Ground	25 November 2006
New South Wales	9/234	South Australia	University Oval, Adelaide	13 January 2007
New South Wales	8/229	Queensland	Allan Border Field	2 December 2006
Victoria	5/223	South Australia	Central Reserve	26 November 2006

=== Most runs ===
Player	Team	Mat	Inns	NO	Runs	HS	Ave	BF	SR	100	50
Kate Blackwell	New South Wales	11	11	3	363	62	45.37	690	52.60	0	3
Melissa Bulow	Queensland	8	8	0	336	116	42.00	494	68.01	1	2
Sarah Elliott	Victoria	11	11	1	332	52*	33.20	716	46.36	0	2
Lisa Sthalekar	New South Wales	11	11	2	325	92*	36.11	413	78.69	0	2
Mel Jones	Victoria	11	11	0	293	69	26.63	560	52.32	0	3

=== Most wickets ===
Player	Team	Mat	Inns	Overs	Mdns	Runs	Wkts	BBI	Ave	SR	4WI
Cathryn Fitzpatrick	Victoria	11	11	104.3	19	305	25	6/22	12.20	25.0	1
Clea Smith	Victoria	11	11	97.5	22	299	20	4/21	14.95	29.3	1
Charlotte Anneveld	New South Wales	11	11	75.0	11	232	15	3/10	15.46	30.0	0
Sarah Andrews	New South Wales	11	11	96.0	18	339	15	3/18	22.60	38.4	0
Kirsten Pike	Queensland	8	8	78.2	19	166	14	4/15	11.85	33.5	1
