= 2000–01 Women's National Cricket League season =

Cricket tournament

Women's National Cricket League 2000–01 season
- Dates: 14 October 2000 – 27 January 2001
- Administrator(s): Cricket Australia
- Cricket format: Limited overs cricket (50 overs)
- Tournament format(s): Group stage and finals series
- Champions: New South Wales (5th title)
- Runners-up: Queensland
- Participants: 5
- Matches: 22
- Player of the series: (South Australia) Karen Rolton
- Most runs: (South Australia) Karen Rolton (492)
- Most wickets: (New South Wales) Emma Liddell (17)
- Official website: cricket.com.au

The 2000–01 Women's National Cricket League season was the fifth season of the Women's National Cricket League, the women's domestic limited overs cricket competition in Australia. The tournament started on 14 October 2000 and finished on 27 January 2001. Defending champions New South Wales Breakers won the tournament for the fifth time after topping the ladder at the conclusion of the group stage and beating Queensland Fire by two games to zero in the finals series.

== Ladder ==
As of 21 January 2001

Pos	Team	Pld	W	L	T	NR	Pts	NRR
1	New South Wales	8	7	1	0	0	42	0.623
2	Queensland	8	4	4	0	0	24	−0.382
3	South Australia	8	3	5	0	0	18	0.017
4	Western Australia	8	3	5	0	0	18	−0.113
5	Victoria	8	3	5	0	0	18	−0.147

Updated to match(es) played on 21 January 2001. Source:
Rules for classification: The top two ranked teams qualified for the finals series.
- Points system: 6 for a win, 3 each for a tie, no result or abandonment, 0 for a loss.

== Fixtures ==
=== 1st final ===
26 January 2001
Scorecard

New South Wales; 5/234 (50 overs)	v	Queensland; 201 (48.3 overs)
Michelle Goszko 80 (101); Tricia Brown 2/57 (10 overs)		Sally Cooper 78* (60); Emma Liddell 4/33 (10 overs)

New South Wales won by 33 runs
Bankstown Oval, Sydney
Umpires: Ron Furtner and Bill Hendricks

- New South Wales won the toss and elected to bat.

=== 2nd final ===
27 January 2001
Scorecard

Queensland; 137 (49.3 overs)	v	New South Wales; 3/138 (34 overs)
Melissa Bulow 30 (63); Emma Liddell 3/25 (8 overs)		Belinda Clark 76* (87); Bronwyn Buckley 2/35 (9 overs)

New South Wales won by 7 wickets
Bankstown Oval, Sydney
Umpires: Ron Furtner and Colin Laden

- Queensland won the toss and elected to bat.
- New South Wales won the 2000–01 Women's National Cricket League.
