= Angela Murnane =

Australian cricketer (born 1983)

Personal information
- Full name: Angela Lee Murnane
- Born: 13 April 1983 (age 43); Brisbane, Queensland, Australia
- Batting: Right-handed
- Bowling: Right-arm medium

Domestic team information
- Years: Team
- 2003/04–2008/09: Queensland

Career statistics
Competition	WLA	WT20
Matches	22	2
Runs scored	149	11
Batting average	12.41	11.00
100s/50s	0/0	0/0
Top score	35	6
Balls bowled	462	12
Wickets	10	0
Bowling average	36.50	–
5 wickets in innings	0	–
10 wickets in match	0	–
Best bowling	2/11	–
Catches/stumpings	8/–	0/–
- Source: CricketArchive, 9 July 2021

Angela Lee Murnane (born 13 April 1983) is a former Australian cricketer. She is a right-handed batter and a right-arm medium pace bowler. Born in Brisbane, Queensland, she represented her home state in 22 List A matches in the Women's National Cricket League (WNCL) between the 2003–04 and 2008–09 seasons.
