= 2010–11 Women's National Cricket League season =

Cricket tournament

Women's National Cricket League 2010–11 season
- Dates: 16 October 2010 – 12 February 2011
- Administrator: Cricket Australia
- Cricket format: Limited overs cricket (50 overs)
- Tournament format(s): Round-robin and final
- Champions: New South Wales (13th title)
- Runners-up: Victoria
- Participants: 7
- Matches: 22
- Player of the series: (Australian Capital Territory) Kris Britt
- Most runs: (Australian Capital Territory) Kris Britt (297)
- Most wickets: (New South Wales) Ellyse Perry (13)
- Official website: cricket.com.au

The 2010–11 Women's National Cricket League season was the 15th season of the Women's National Cricket League, the women's domestic limited overs cricket competition in Australia. The tournament started on 16 October 2010 and finished on 12 February 2011. The season saw the addition of Tasmanian Roar, taking the number of teams up to seven. Defending champions New South Wales Breakers won the tournament for the 13th time after topping the ladder at the conclusion of the round-robin phase and beating Victorian Spirit in the final.

== Ladder ==
As of 30 January 2011

Pos	Team	Pld	W	L	T	NR	BP	Pts	NRR
1	New South Wales	6	5	0	0	1	6	28	2.452
2	Victoria	6	3	0	0	3	5	23	3.291
3	Australian Capital Territory	6	4	2	0	0	5	21	0.233
4	Western Australia	6	3	2	0	1	2	16	0.095
5	South Australia	6	2	4	0	0	0	8	−0.728
6	Queensland	6	1	4	0	1	1	7	−1.104
7	Tasmania	6	0	6	0	0	0	0	−2.015

Updated to match(es) played on 30 January 2011. Source:
Rules for classification: The top two ranked teams qualified for the final.
- Points system: 4 for a win, 2 each for a tie or a no result, 0 for a loss, 1 each for an abandoned match.
- Bonus point system: 2 for win with a run rate twice that of the opposition, 1 for win with a run rate 1.25 times that of the opposition.

== Fixtures ==
=== Round-robin phase ===
Match 1
16 October 2010
10:00
Scorecard

(home team) Australian Capital Territory	v	Victoria

Victoria won by 6 wickets (with 149 balls remaining)
Manuka Oval, Canberra

Match 2
16 October 2010
10:00
Scorecard

(home team) New South Wales	v	Tasmania

New South Wales won by 235 runs
North Sydney Oval, Sydney

Match 3
17 October 2010
10:00
Scorecard

(home team) Western Australia	v	South Australia

Western Australia won by 89 runs
WACA Ground, Perth

Match 4
30 October 2010
10:00
Scorecard

(home team) Victoria	v	Western Australia

No result
Geelong Cricket Ground, Geelong

Match 5
30 October 2010
10:00
Scorecard

(home team) Queensland	v	New South Wales

New South Wales won by 3 wickets (with 115 balls remaining)
Allan Border Field, Brisbane

Match 6
31 October 2010
10:00
Scorecard

Australian Capital Territory	v	Tasmania (home team)

ACT won by 44 runs
NTCA Ground, Launceston

Match 7
13 November 2010
10:00
Scorecard

(home team) Australian Capital Territory	v	Western Australia

ACT won by 64 runs
Manuka Oval, Canberra

Match 8
13 November 2010
10:00
Scorecard

New South Wales	v	Victoria (home team)

No result
Melbourne Cricket Ground, Melbourne

Match 9
13 November 2010
10:00
Scorecard

(home team) Queensland	v	South Australia

South Australia won by 4 wickets (with 9 balls remaining)
Brisbane Cricket Ground, Brisbane

Match 10
27 November 2010
10:00
Scorecard

Western Australia	v	New South Wales (home team)

New South Wales won by 4 wickets (with 94 balls remaining)
Sydney Cricket Ground, Sydney

Match 11
27 November 2010
10:00
Scorecard

Queensland	v	Australian Capital Territory (home team)

ACT won by 9 wickets (with 164 balls remaining)
Manuka Oval, Canberra

Match 12
27 November 2010
10:00
Scorecard

(home team) South Australia	v	Tasmania

South Australia won by 22 runs
Park 25, Adelaide

Match 13
11 December 2010
10:00
Scorecard

Victoria	v	Tasmania (home team)

Victoria won by 225 runs
Bellerive Oval, Hobart

Match 14
11 December 2010
10:00
Scorecard

(home team) South Australia	v	Australian Capital Territory

ACT won by 3 wickets (with 61 balls remaining)
Glandore Oval, Adelaide

Match 15
11 December 2010
10:00
Scorecard

Queensland	v	Western Australia (home team)

Western Australia won by 6 wickets (with 72 balls remaining)
Floreat Park Oval, Perth

Match 16
5 January 2011
10:00
Scorecard

(home team) South Australia	v	New South Wales

New South Wales won by 5 wickets (with 33 balls remaining)
Adelaide Oval, Adelaide

Match 17
8 January 2011
10:00
Scorecard

(home team) Queensland	v	Victoria

Match abandoned
Allan Border Field, Brisbane

Match 18
14 January 2011
10:00
Scorecard

Tasmania	v	Western Australia (home team)

Western Australia won by 3 wickets (with 17 balls remaining)
Floreat Park Oval, Perth

Match 19
28 January 2011
10:00
Scorecard

(home team) Tasmania	v	Queensland

Queensland won by 7 wickets (with 70 balls remaining)
Bellerive Oval, Hobart

Match 20
29 January 2011
10:00
Scorecard

South Australia	v	Victoria (home team)

Victoria won by 6 wickets (with 106 balls remaining)
Junction Oval, Melbourne

Match 21
30 January 2011
10:00
Scorecard

Australian Capital Territory	v	New South Wales (home team)

New South Wales won by 7 wickets (with 149 balls remaining)
Drummoyne Oval, Sydney

== Final ==
12 February 2011
10:00
Scorecard

Victoria; 263 (48.5 overs)	v	New South Wales; 2/193 (34.1 overs)
Rachael Haynes 68 (76); Nicole Goodwin 2/36 (9 overs)		Alex Blackwell 68* (81); Sarah Elliott 2/32 (8 overs)

New South Wales won by 49 runs (D/L method)
Sydney Cricket Ground
Umpires: John Ward and Michael Kumutat
Player of the match: Alex Blackwell (New South Wales)

- New South Wales won the toss and elected to field.
- New South Wales won the 2010–11 Women's National Cricket League.

== Statistics ==
=== Highest totals ===
Team	Score	Against	Venue	Date
New South Wales	5/395	Tasmania	North Sydney Oval, Sydney	16 October 2010
Victoria	8/344	Tasmania	Bellerive Oval, Hobart	11 December 2010
Australian Capital Territory	6/308	Western Australia	Manuka Oval, Canberra	13 November 2010
Victoria	263	New South Wales	Sydney Cricket Ground	12 February 2011
Western Australia	8/262	South Australia	WACA Ground, Perth	17 October 2010

=== Most runs ===
Player	Team	Mat	Inns	NO	Runs	HS	Ave	BF	SR	100	50
Kris Britt	Australian Capital Territory	6	6	2	297	145*	77.74	382	99.75	1	1
Rachael Haynes	Victoria	6	5	0	284	132	56.80	322	88.19	1	2
Alex Blackwell	New South Wales	5	5	1	276	157	69.00	272	101.47	1	1
Leah Poulton	New South Wales	6	6	1	262	86	52.40	293	89.41	0	2
Jess Jonassen	Queensland	5	5	1	228	97*	57.00	285	80.00	0	3

=== Most wickets ===
Player	Team	Mat	Inns	Overs	Mdns	Runs	Wkts	BBI	Ave	SR	4WI
Ellyse Perry	New South Wales	5	5	40.5	8	120	13	5/11	9.23	18.8	2
Charlotte Anneveld	Australian Capital Territory	5	5	36.0	4	120	11	4/24	10.90	19.6	1
Kris Britt	Australian Capital Territory	6	6	39.0	2	133	9	5/22	14.77	26.0	1
Veronica Pyke	Tasmania	6	6	51.2	4	247	9	3/39	27.44	34.2	0
Cara Fiebig	South Australia	5	5	29.0	0	122	8	3/34	15.25	21.7	0
