= 2003–04 Women's National Cricket League season =

Cricket tournament

Women's National Cricket League 2003–04 season
- Dates: 22 November 2003 – 2 February 2004
- Administrator(s): Cricket Australia
- Cricket format: Limited overs cricket (50 overs)
- Tournament format(s): Group stage and finals series
- Champions: New South Wales (7th title)
- Runners-up: Victoria
- Participants: 5
- Matches: 23
- Player of the series: (Victoria (state)) Belinda Clark
- Most runs: (Victoria (state)) Belinda Clark (622)
- Most wickets: (Victoria (state)) Cathryn Fitzpatrick (18)
- Official website: cricket.com.au

The 2003–04 Women's National Cricket League season was the eighth season of the Women's National Cricket League, the women's domestic limited overs cricket competition in Australia. The tournament started on 22 November 2003 and finished on 2 February 2004. New South Wales Breakers won the tournament for the seventh time after finishing second on the ladder at the conclusion of the group stage and beating defending champions Victorian Spirit by two games to one in the finals series.

== Ladder ==
As of 18 January 2004

Pos	Team	Pld	W	L	T	NR	BP	Pts	NRR
1	Victoria	8	6	1	1	0	4	30	0.722
2	New South Wales	8	5	2	1	0	5	27	0.973
3	South Australia	8	4	3	0	1	0	18	−0.044
4	Western Australia	8	2	5	0	1	0	10	−0.971
5	Queensland	8	0	6	0	2	0	4	−0.952

Updated to match(es) played on 18 January 2004. Source:
Rules for classification: The top two ranked teams qualified for the finals series.
- Points system: 4 for a win, 2 each for a tie, no result or abandonment, 0 for a loss.

== Fixtures ==
=== 1st final ===
31 January 2004
Scorecard

New South Wales; 128 (45.1 overs)	v	Victoria; 4/129 (48.3 overs)
Lisa Keightley 60 (118); Megan Pauwels 3/7 (4.1 overs)		Belinda Clark 38 (77); Lisa Sthalekar 2/19 (10 overs)

Victoria won by 6 wickets
Melbourne Cricket Ground
Umpires: Ashley Barrow and Tony Ward

- Victoria won the toss and elected to field.

=== 2nd final ===
1 February 2004
Scorecard

Victoria; 8/162 (50 overs)	v	New South Wales; 5/163 (48 overs)
Belinda Clark 52 (107); Bronwyn Calver 3/37 (9 overs)		Shannon Cunneen 48 (106); Cathryn Fitzpatrick 1/18 (9 overs)

New South Wales won by 5 wickets
Melbourne Cricket Ground
Umpires: Ashley Barrow and Tony Ward

- New South Wales won the toss and elected to field.

=== 3rd final ===
2 February 2004
Scorecard

Victoria; 4/217 (50 overs)	v	New South Wales; 7/218 (48.4 overs)
Belinda Clark 115 (145); Lisa Keightley 1/26 (8 overs)		Lisa Keightley 75 (100); Cathryn Fitzpatrick 3/38 (9.4 overs)

New South Wales won by 3 wickets
Melbourne Cricket Ground
Umpires: Ashley Barrow and Tony Ward

- Victoria won the toss and elected to bat.
- New South Wales won the 2003–04 Women's National Cricket League.

== Statistics ==
=== Highest totals ===
Team	Score	Against	Venue	Date
New South Wales	8/284	Western Australia	WACA Ground, Perth	23 November 2003
New South Wales	6/266	Western Australia	WACA Ground, Perth	22 November 2003
Victoria	7/265	Western Australia	Princes Park No 2 Oval	6 December 2003

=== Most runs ===
Player	Team	Mat	Inns	NO	Runs	HS	Ave	BF	SR	100	50
Belinda Clark	Victoria	11	11	2	622	115	69.11	973	63.92	2	4
Lisa Keightley	New South Wales	11	11	0	394	76	35.81	704	55.96	0	4
Shannon Cunneen	New South Wales	11	11	0	336	72	30.54	602	55.81	0	3
Lisa Sthalekar	New South Wales	11	11	0	313	108	28.45	424	73.82	1	1
Karen Rolton	South Australia	8	8	2	302	102*	50.33	460	65.65	1	2

=== Most wickets ===
Player	Team	Mat	Inns	Overs	Mdns	Runs	Wkts	BBI	Ave	SR	4WI
Cathryn Fitzpatrick	Victoria	11	11	96.0	21	275	18	3/13	15.27	32.0	0
Lisa Sthalekar	New South Wales	11	11	97.0	16	267	14	3/34	19.07	41.5	0
Bronwyn Calver	New South Wales	11	11	78.2	12	263	12	3/37	21.91	39.1	0
Connie Wong	Western Australia	8	8	72.1	8	297	12	3/47	24.75	36.0	0
Cindy Kross	Western Australia	6	6	59.0	12	225	11	3/27	20.45	32.1	0
