= 2013–14 Women's National Cricket League season =

Cricket tournament

Women's National Cricket League 2013–14 season
- Dates: 12 October 2013 – 16 February 2014
- Administrator: Cricket Australia
- Cricket format: Limited overs cricket (50 overs)
- Tournament format(s): Round-robin and final
- Champions: New South Wales (16th title)
- Runners-up: Victoria
- Participants: 7
- Matches: 22
- Player of the series: (Western Australia) Nicole Bolton
- Most runs: (Western Australia) Nicole Bolton (371)
- Most wickets: (Victoria (state)) Kristen Beams (14)
- Official website: cricket.com.au

The 2013–14 Women's National Cricket League season was the 18th season of the Women's National Cricket League, the women's domestic limited overs cricket competition in Australia. The tournament started on 12 October 2013 and finished on 16 February 2014. Defending champions New South Wales Breakers won the tournament for the 16th time after topping the ladder at the conclusion of the round-robin stage and beating Victorian Spirit in the final. Nicole Bolton was the player of the series.

== Ladder ==
As of 3 January 2014

Pos	Team	Pld	W	L	T	NR	BP	Pts	NRR
1	New South Wales	6	6	0	0	0	7	31	1.950
2	Victoria	6	5	1	0	0	5	25	1.170
3	Western Australia	6	3	3	0	0	3	15	0.174
4	South Australia	6	3	3	0	0	3	15	−0.482
5	Queensland	6	2	4	0	0	3	11	0.243
6	Australian Capital Territory	6	2	4	0	0	2	10	−0.270
7	Tasmania	6	0	6	0	0	0	0	−2.891

Updated to match(es) played on 3 January 2014. Source:
Rules for classification: The top two ranked teams qualified for the final.
- Points system: 4 for a win, 2 each for a tie or a no result, 0 for a loss, 1 each for an abandoned match.
- Bonus point system: 2 for win with a run rate twice that of the opposition, 1 for win with a run rate 1.25 times that of the opposition.

== Fixtures ==
=== Round-robin phase ===
Match 1
12 October 2013
Scorecard

(home team) Queensland	v	Tasmania

Allan Border Field, Brisbane

Match 2
12 October 2013
Scorecard

(home team) Western Australia	v	Australian Capital Territory

WACA Ground, Perth

Match 3
19 October 2013
Scorecard

(home team) South Australia	v	Victoria

Park 25, Adelaide

Match 4
26 October 2013
Scorecard

(home team) Queensland	v	Western Australia

Heritage Oval, Toowoomba

Match 5
26 October 2013
Scorecard

New South Wales	v	Tasmania (home team)

NTCA Ground, Launceston

Match 6
26 October 2013
Scorecard

Australian Capital Territory	v	Victoria (home team)

Russell Lucas Oval, Melbourne

Match 7
9 November 2013
Scorecard

(home team) Australian Capital Territory	v	Tasmania

Freebody Oval, Queanbeyan

Match 8
9 November 2013
Scorecard

(home team) New South Wales	v	Victoria

Blacktown Olympic Park Oval, Sydney

Match 9
9 November 2013
Scorecard

(home team) South Australia	v	Western Australia

Park 25, Adelaide

Match 10
16 November 2013
Scorecard

(home team) South Australia	v	Victoria

Campbelltown Memorial Oval, Adelaide

Match 11
23 November 2013
Scorecard

(home team) New South Wales	v	Australian Capital Territory

Robertson Oval, Wagga Wagga

Match 12
23 November 2013
Scorecard

Victoria	v	Western Australia (home team)

Murdoch University Ground, Perth

Match 13
7 December 2013
Scorecard

(home team) Australian Capital Territory	v	South Australia

Freebody Oval, Queanbeyan

Match 14
7 December 2013
Scorecard

(home team) New South Wales	v	Queensland

Blacktown Olympic Park Oval, Sydney

Match 15
7 December 2013
Scorecard

Tasmania	v	Victoria (home team)

Junction Oval, Melbourne

Match 16
20 December 2013
Scorecard

Western Australia	v	Tasmania (home team)

Bellerive Oval, Hobart

Match 17
20 December 2013
Scorecard

South Australia	v	New South Wales (home team)

Drummoyne Oval, Sydney

Match 18
21 December 2013
Scorecard

Australian Capital Territory	v	Queensland (home team)

Allan Border Field, Brisbane

Match 19
2 January 2014
Scorecard

New South Wales	v	Western Australia (home team)

Floreat Park Oval, Perth

Match 20
3 January 2014
Scorecard

(home team) Tasmania	v	South Australia

Bellerive Oval, Hobart

Match 21
3 January 2014
Scorecard

Victoria	v	Queensland (home team)

Junction Oval, Melbourne

== Final ==
16 February 2014
Scorecard

Victoria; 9/111 (20 overs)	v	New South Wales; 3/114 (18.5 overs)
Meg Lanning 49 (48); Rachael Haynes 3/20 (4 overs)		Leah Poulton 48 (48); Julie Hunter 1/12 (3 overs)

New South Wales won by 7 wickets (with 7 balls remaining)
North Sydney Oval, Sydney
Umpires: Shawn Craig and Michael Graham-Smith
Player of the match: Rachael Haynes (New South Wales)

- New South Wales won the toss and elected to field.
- Match reduced to 20 overs per side due to rain.
- New South Wales won the 2014–15 Women's National Cricket League.

== Statistics ==
=== Highest totals ===
Team	Score	Against	Venue	Date
Queensland	6/351	Tasmania	Allan Border Field, Brisbane	12 October 2013
Western Australia	5/329	Tasmania	Bellerive Oval, Hobart	20 December 2013
Australian Capital Territory	9/297	Tasmania	Freebody Oval, Queanbeyan	9 November 2013
New South Wales	8/297	Australian Capital Territory	Robertson Oval, Wagga Wagga	23 November 2013
Victoria	8/275	South Australia	Park 25, Adelaide	19 October 2013

=== Most runs ===
Player	Team	Mat	Inns	NO	Runs	HS	Ave	BF	SR	100	50
Nicole Bolton	Western Australia	6	6	0	371	129	61.83	498	74.49	1	2
Leah Poulton	New South Wales	7	7	1	347	109	57.83	386	89.89	1	1
Meg Lanning	Victoria	6	6	0	260	78	43.33	244	106.55	0	2
Jodie Fields	Queensland	5	5	0	253	150	50.60	269	94.05	1	0
Lauren Ebsary	South Australia	6	6	0	251	67	41.83	309	81.22	0	3

=== Most wickets ===
Player	Team	Mat	Inns	Overs	Mdns	Runs	Wkts	BBI	Ave	SR	4WI
Kristen Beams	Victoria	7	7	51.5	4	185	14	5/20	13.21	22.2	1
Erin Osborne	New South Wales	7	7	41.3	6	141	12	4/45	11.75	20.7	1
Ellyse Perry	New South Wales	5	5	39.2	9	126	10	4/26	12.60	23.6	1
Jess Jonassen	Queensland	6	6	45.0	3	223	10	4/32	22.30	27.0	1
Jemma Barsby	Queensland	6	6	46.0	0	229	10	3/49	22.90	27.6	0
