= Shannon Cunneen =

Australian former cricket player

Personal information
- Full name: Shannon Brooke Cunneen
- Born: 2 March 1977 (age 49); Orange, New South Wales
- Batting: Right-handed
- Role: Wicket-keeper

International information
- National side: Australia
- ODI debut (cap 100): 11 February 2004 v New Zealand
- Last ODI: 27 February 2004 v New Zealand

Domestic team information
- Years: Team
- 1997/98–2004/05: New South Wales

Career statistics
Competition	ODI	List A
Matches	4	46
Runs scored	49	971
Batting average	16.33	26.97
100s/50s	0/0	0/5
Top score	39	72
Catches/stumpings	1/0	18/2
- Source: CricInfo, 7 August 2025

Shannon Brooke Cunneen (born 2 March 1977) is an Australian former cricket player.

She played 41 Women's National Cricket League games for the New South Wales Breakers.

Cunneen represented the Australia national women's cricket team in four One Day Internationals. She was the 100th woman to play One Day International cricket for Australia.
