= Kelly Applebee =

Australian cricketer (born 1982)

Personal information
- Full name: Kelly Maree Applebee
- Born: 28 January 1982 (age 44); Bairnsdale, Victoria, Australia
- Batting: Right-handed
- Bowling: Right-arm medium
- Role: Middle-order batter

Domestic team information
- Years: Team
- 2001/02–2015/16: Victoria
- 2015/16: Melbourne Stars

Career statistics
Competition	WFC	WLA	WT20
Matches	1	131	71
Runs scored	23	2,492	733
Batting average	11.50	24.92	20.94
100s/50s	0/0	0/10	0/0
Top score	20	86	47*
Balls bowled	–	374	–
Wickets	–	11	–
Bowling average	–	22.09	–
5 wickets in innings	–	0	–
10 wickets in match	–	0	–
Best bowling	–	3/18	–
Catches/stumpings	0/–	35/–	15/–
- Source: CricketArchive, 4 July 2021

Kelly Maree Applebee (born 28 January 1982) is a former Australian cricketer. A right-handed middle-order batter, she was capped at under-23 level for Australia. She played 131 List A matches for Victoria between the 2001–02 and 2015–16 seasons of the Women's National Cricket League (WNCL). She captained Victoria and made 2,492 runs in the WNCL. Applebee also played for the Melbourne Stars in the Women's Big Bash League (WBBL) during the 2015–16 season.

Applebee was born in Bairnsdale, Victoria. She has a child with her partner Emma. She has worked for the AFL Players Association and the Australian Cricketers' Association.
