= Martha Winch =

Australian cricketer (born 1978)

Personal information
- Full name: Martha Anne Winch
- Born: 31 October 1978 (age 48)
- Batting: Left-handed
- Bowling: Right-arm medium

International information
- National side: Australia
- ODI debut (cap 87): 7 February 1999 v South Africa
- Last ODI: 9 February 2000 v New Zealand

Career statistics
Competition	ODI	List A
Matches	7	77
Runs scored	122	1,346
Batting average	24.40	24.03
100s/50s	0/4	1/5
Top score	54	101*
Balls bowled	24	60
Wickets	1	1
Bowling average	11.00	47.00
5 wickets in innings	0	0
10 wickets in match	0	0
Best bowling	1/11	1/11
Catches/stumpings	2/–	25/–
- Source: Cricinfo, 15 May 2014

Martha Anne Winch (born 31 October 1978) is an Australian former cricketer.

Winch played domestic cricket for the New South Wales Breakers between 1997 and 2007. She was a member of the Breakers team that won five consecutive Women's National Cricket League titles between 2005/06 and 2009/10, beginning with the 2005/06 finals series against the Queensland Fire.

Winch played seven One Day Internationals for the Australia national women's cricket team.
