= Jude Coleman =

Australian cricketer (born 1981)

Personal information
- Full name: Judith Claire Coleman
- Batting: Right-handed
- Bowling: Right-arm medium
- Role: All-rounder

Domestic team information
- Years: Team
- 2004/05–2012/13: Queensland

Career statistics
Competition	WLA	WT20
Matches	60	33
Runs scored	530	253
Batting average	13.94	13.31
100s/50s	0/0	0/1
Top score	29*	62
Balls bowled	2,966	688
Wickets	84	22
Bowling average	22.30	31.63
5 wickets in innings	1	0
10 wickets in match	0	0
Best bowling	5/26	3/5
Catches/stumpings	19/–	8/–
- Source: CricketArchive, 18 September 2023

Judith Claire Coleman (born 16 February 1981) is an Australian former cricketer and current cricket coach. Coleman played 60 Women's National Cricket League matches for Queensland.

After Kirsten Pike, Coleman has taken the second most wickets for Queensland in the Women's National Cricket League.
