= Louise Broadfoot =

Australian former cricket player

Personal information
- Full name: Louise Catherine Broadfoot
- Batting: Right-handed
- Bowling: Right-arm leg-spin

International information
- National side: Australia
- Test debut (cap 137): 24 June 2001 v England
- Last Test: 6 July 2001 v England
- ODI debut (cap 92): 3 December 2000 v Ireland
- Last ODI: 1 April 2005 v Ireland

Domestic team information
- Years: Team
- 1996/97–2004/05: Victoria
- 2005/06–2009/10: Queensland

Career statistics
Competition	Test	ODI	FC	LA
Matches	2	10	4	135
Runs scored	95	50	156	2,114
Batting average	47.50	10.00	39.00	19.75
100s/50s	0/1	0/0	0/1	0/8
Top score	71	19	71	91
Balls bowled	–	168	553	4,158
Wickets	–	4	5	98
Bowling average	–	19.25	28.66	27.12
5 wickets in innings	–	0	0	0
10 wickets in match	–	0	0	0
Best bowling	–	1/4	2/38	4/14
Catches/stumpings	2/–	1/–	4/–	38/–
- Source: CricInfo, 4 May 2025

Louise Catherine Broadfoot (born 26 February 1978) is an Australian former cricket player. She was born at Melbourne.

Broadfoot played domestic cricket for the Victorian Spirit between 1996 and 2004 and the Queensland Fire between 2005 and 2010. She played 113 Women's National Cricket League matches and five Women's Twenty20 matches.

Broadfoot played two Tests and ten One Day Internationals for the Australia national women's cricket team. Broadfoot was the 137th woman to play Test Cricket for Australia, and the 92nd woman to play One Day International Cricket for Australia. Broadfoot also served in the Australian Army in Afghanistan.

Originally from Melbourne, her sister is Marianne Edwards (nee Broadfoot), associate principal second violin in the Sydney Symphony Orchestra and her brother is barrister Andrew Broadfoot KC, former Australian rowing representative and part owner of 2015 Melbourne Cup winner Prince of Penzance.
