= Subiaco-Floreat Cricket Club =

Australian cricket club

== History ==
Subiaco-Floreat Cricket Club is one of the sixteen cricket clubs playing in the Western Australian Grade Cricket competition. It was founded in 1977 as a result of the amalgamation of Subiaco Cricket Club and Floreat Park Cricket Club.

The Subiaco Club was formed in 1907 when it was admitted to the Western Australian Cricket Association. Notable former players included former Prime Minister of Australia Bob Hawke, John Rutherford and Des Hoare.

Floreat Park Cricket Club was founded in 1956 and played in the WACA 2nd Grade. Notable former players from there included Australian captain Kim Hughes and Terry Alderman.

== Home Ground ==
The club's main ground is Floreat Oval, on the corner of Oceanic Drive and Ulster Road, Floreat.

== Club Achievements ==
Premierships
Competition	Grade	Seasons
Two Day - Male	1st Grade	1987-88, 2000-01, 2001-02, 2002-03, 2010-11, 2016-17, 2021-22
Two Day - Male	2nd Grade	1977-78, 1980-81, 1990-91, 1993-94, 2023-24
Two Day - Male	3rd Grade	1986-87, 2001-02, 2009-10, 2012-13, 2019-20, 2025-26
Two Day - Male	4th Grade	1977-78, 1982-83, 1983-84, 1984-85, 1990-91, 1994-95, 2000-01
One Day - Male	1st Grade	2004-05, 2008-09, 2010-11, 2013-14, 2021-2022
One Day - Male	Colts - Male	1983-84, 1997-98, 1998-99, 2000-01, 2007-08, 2009-10, 2018-19, 2019-20
One Day - Female	A Grade	2018-19, 2021-22, 2024-25, 2025-26
T20 - Female	A Grade	2014-15, 2024-25, 2025-26
T20 - Female	B Grade	2018-19
T20 - Female	Youth Premier League	2019-20

== Notable players ==
- John Rutherford
- Kim Hughes
- Terry Alderman
- Graeme Porter
- Nathan Coulter-Nile
- Nicole Bolton
- Jason Behrendorff
- Marcus Stoinis
- Cameron Green
- Heather Graham
