= Julie Hayes =

Australian cricketer (born 1973)

Personal information
- Born: 2 May 1973 (age 53); Ryde, New South Wales
- Batting: Right-handed
- Bowling: Right-arm medium

International information
- National side: Australia
- Test debut (cap 140): 6 July 2001 v England
- Last Test: 18 February 2006 v India
- ODI debut (cap 90): 1 December 2000 v Sri Lanka
- Last ODI: 28 October 2006 v New Zealand
- T20I debut (cap 6): 2 September 2005 v England
- Last T20I: 18 October 2006 v New Zealand

Domestic team information
- Years: Team
- 1995/96–2006/07: New South Wales

Career statistics
Competition	Test	ODI	T20I	LA
Matches	6	59	2	181
Runs scored	118	241	–	889
Batting average	14.75	14.17	–	12.01
100s/50s	0/1	0/0	–	0/1
Top score	57	44	–	58*
Balls bowled	926	3,161	42	9,286
Wickets	10	65	2	203
Bowling average	25.70	24.23	23.50	23.74
5 wickets in innings	0	0	0	0
10 wickets in match	0	0	0	0
Best bowling	3/29	4/31	2/19	6/18
Catches/stumpings	4/-	12/–	2/–	48/–
- Source: CricketArchive, 23 June 2014

Julie Hayes (born 2 May 1973) is an Australian former cricket player.

Hayes played 117 Women's National Cricket League matches for New South Wales and six Tests, 59 One Day Internationals, and two Women's Twenty20 Internationals for the Australia national cricket team. She was the 140th woman to play Test cricket for Australia.

Hayes took the deciding wicket in a bowl-out in the first Women's Twenty20 International played in Australia, when the Australian women played New Zealand at the Allan Border Field on 18 October 2006.
