= Kirsten Pike =

Australian former cricketer (born 1984)

Personal information
- Full name: Kirsten Elizabeth Pike
- Batting: Right-handed
- Bowling: Right-arm fast-medium

International information
- National side: Australia
- Only Test (cap 153): 5 February 2008 v England
- ODI debut (cap 103): 21 August 2005 v England
- Last ODI: 8 November 2008 v India
- T20I debut (cap 9): 2 September 2005 v England
- Last T20I: 25 June 2009 v England

Domestic team information
- Years: Team
- 2001/02–2013/14: Queensland Fire

Career statistics
| Competition | Test | ODI | T20I |
|---|---|---|---|
| Matches | 1 | 26 | 10 |
| Runs scored | 14 | 50 | 1 |
| Batting average | 7.00 | 8.33 | 1.00 |
| 100s/50s | 0/0 | 0/0 | 0/0 |
| Top score | 10 | 57 | 1 |
| Balls bowled | 138 | 1,291 | 169 |
| Wickets | 1 | 34 | 5 |
| Bowling average | 39.00 | 21.73 | 41.40 |
| 5 wickets in innings | 0 | 0 | 0 |
| 10 wickets in match | 0 | 0 | 0 |
| Best bowling | 1/29 | 4/23 | 1/13 |
| Catches/stumpings | 0/– | 8/– | 0/– |
- Source: Cricinfo, 8 August 2025

Kirsten Elizabeth Pike (born 12 November 1984) is an Australian former cricketer.

Pike, a right-arm fast-medium pace bowler and right-hand batter, played 86 Women's National Cricket League matches for the Queensland Fire, retiring following the 2013–14 season after helping to win the team's first Twenty20 title. She finished her career as Queensland's all-time leading wicket-taker.

Pike also played one Women's Test, 26 Women's One-day Internationals and ten Women's Twenty20 Internationals for the Australian women's cricket team. She is the 153rd woman to play Test cricket for Australia, and the 103rd woman to play One Day International cricket for Australia.

Pike studied law at the Queensland University of Technology, and as of 2019 was working as a partner in the Brisbane real estate team of Dentons, an international law firm. In September 2017 she became the second woman ever elected to the board of directors of Queensland Cricket, and in June 2019 she was appointed the deputy chair. Since retiring from cricket, Pike has participated regularly in the Chain Reaction Challenge Foundation's charity cycling events, which she described as "a fantastic substitute for not playing cricket anymore."
