= Terry McGregor =

Australian cricketer (born 1977)

Personal information
- Full name: Therese Ann McGregor
- Born: 5 July 1977 (age 49); Sydney, New South Wales
- Batting: Right-handed
- Bowling: Right-arm fast–medium, Leg-spin

International information
- National side: Australia
- Test debut (cap 139): 24 June 2001 v England
- Last Test: 22 February 2003 v England
- ODI debut (cap 89): 23 February 1999 v New Zealand
- Last ODI: 6 March 2002 v New Zealand

Domestic team information
- Years: Team
- 1997/98–2002/03: New South Wales Breakers

Career statistics
Competition	Test	ODI	LA
Matches	4	26	77
Runs scored	32	157	333
Batting average	16.00	52.33	20.81
100s/50s	0/0	0/0	0/0
Top score	23	28*	28*
Balls bowled	510	1344	3,984
Wickets	10	36	106
Bowling average	11.20	17.52	18.33
5 wickets in innings	0	0	0
10 wickets in match	0	0	0
Best bowling	4/20	4/8	4/8
Catches/stumpings	2/-	8/–	17/–
- Source: CricInfo, 18 June 2014

Therese Ann McGregor (born 5 July 1977) is an Australian former cricket player.

She played 46 matches for the New South Wales Breakers in the Women's National Cricket League.

McGregor played four Tests and 26 One Day Internationals for the Australia national women's cricket team. She is the 89th woman to be capped for Australia in One Day Internationals, and the 139th woman to play Test Cricket for Australia.
