= Bankstown Oval =

Sports stadium in Sydney, Australia

Coordinates: 33°55′19″S 151°01′56″E

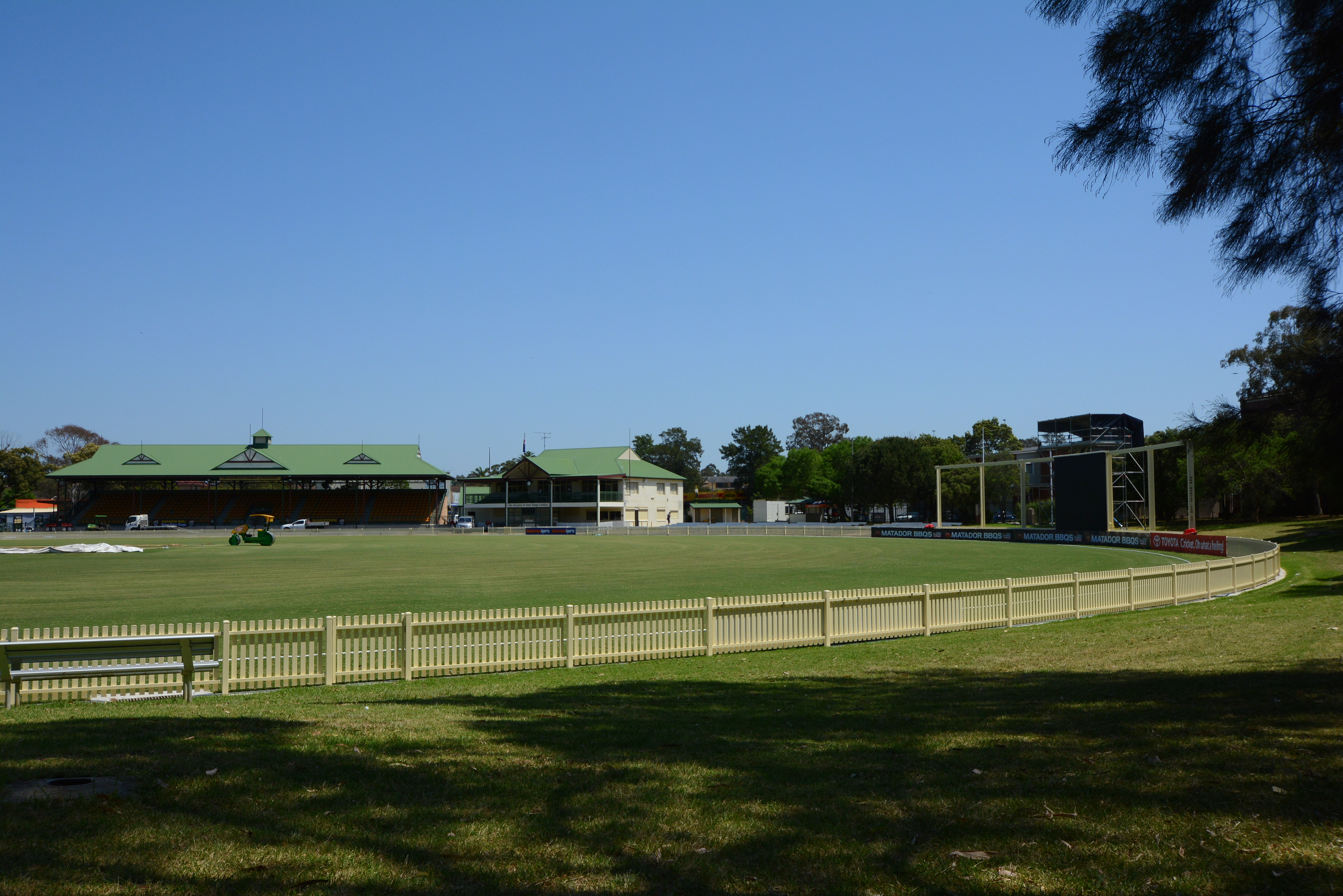
- Bankstown Oval in 2015
- Interactive map of Bankstown Oval

Ground information
- Location: Bankstown, New South Wales
- Capacity: 8,000
- Tenants: Bankstown DCC (1951–present)

International information
- First women's Test: 22 February 2003: Australia v England
- Last women's Test: 22 February 2011: Australia v England
- First WODI: 5 November 1997: Australia v New Zealand
- Last WODI: 21 March 2009: Australia v India
- As of 7 September 2020; Source: Cricinfo

Bankstown Oval (also known as Bankstown Memorial Oval) is a multi-purpose stadium located in Bankstown, a south-western suburb of Sydney, New South Wales, Australia.

It is currently used mostly for cricket matches and has been used by New South Wales, particularly for one day matches. It has also hosted 4 first class games in the Sheffield Shield. Its pavilion is named after Australian Test batsmen Steve Waugh and Mark Waugh, who both appeared for the Bankstown District Cricket Club. It hosted a Women's Ashes test on England's 2002/3 tour and again in January 2010. The ground has also been used for local AFL matches. The stadium currently has a capacity of 8,000 people.

In the 1940s and 1950s it was the home ground of Bankstown Soccer Club, the predecessor to Bankstown City FC.
