= Sarah Elliott (cricketer) =

Australian cricketer (born 1982)

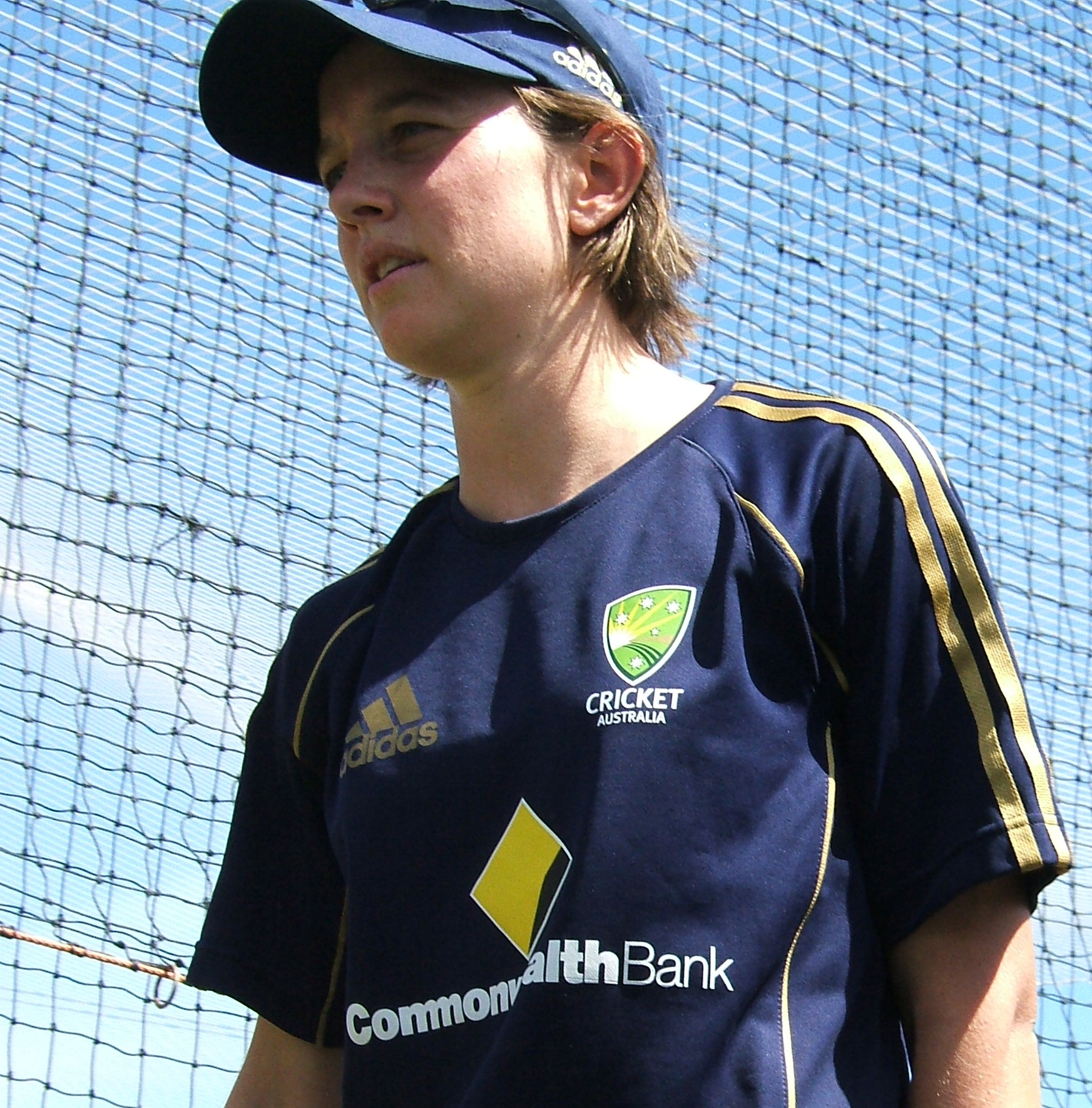
- Elliott in 2010

Personal information
- Full name: Sarah Jane Elliott
- Born: 4 January 1982 (age 44); Melbourne, Victoria, Australia
- Nickname: Sticksy
- Batting: Right-handed
- Bowling: Right-arm leg break
- Role: All-rounder

International information
- National side: Australia
- Test debut (cap 161): 22 January 2011 v England
- Last Test: 10 January 2014 v England
- ODI debut (cap 104): 1 September 2005 v England
- Last ODI: 7 March 2010 v New Zealand

Domestic team information
- Years: Team
- 2000/01–2016/17: Victoria
- 2015/16: Melbourne Renegades
- 2016/17: Adelaide Strikers

Career statistics
Competition	WTest	WODI	WT20I	WLA
Matches	3	22	14	143
Runs scored	238	416	62	3,387
Batting average	47.60	32.00	7.75	28.46
100s/50s	1/1	0/4	0/0	2/23
Top score	104	96	19*	101
Balls bowled	231	78	86	2,077
Wickets	2	2	6	53
Bowling average	50.00	28.00	14.83	25.39
5 wickets in innings	0	0	0	0
10 wickets in match	0	0	0	0
Best bowling	1/14	2/14	3/17	3/4
Catches/stumpings	2/–	9/–	5/–	39/–
- Source: CricketArchive, 16 October 2022

Sarah Jane Elliott (née Edwards; born 4 January 1982) is an Australian former cricketer who played as a right-handed batter and right-arm leg break bowler. She appeared in three Test matches, 22 One Day Internationals and 14 Twenty20 Internationals for Australia between 2005 and 2014. She played domestic cricket for Victoria, Melbourne Renegades and Adelaide Strikers.

Edwards made her senior debut for Victoria mid-way through the 2000–01 season soon after turning 19. At this stage of her career, Edwards was a specialist batsman and did not bowl her first ball in senior cricket until six years later. She was not productive with the bat in her first two seasons, and was dropped after making a duck in her only innings of the third season. Up to this point, she had made only 165 runs at 11.00. She regained her place in the 2003–04 season but averaged less than 10. Nevertheless, she was selected for the Australian Under-23 team and made 51 and 97 in matches against the Sri Lankan national team. Edwards made her breakthrough in the 2004–05 WNCL, scoring 281 runs, more than she had made in her first four seasons combined. She was selected for the 2005 tour of England, but was not selected in the Tests; she made her One Day International (ODI) debut in the last match but neither batted or bowled. Edwards was then dropped from the national team and did not play for Australia again until a solitary ODI at the start of the 2006–07 season. After scoring 332 runs in the WNCL season, she was given a consistent run in the national team for the first time, playing in just over half the matches during the year. She made only 37 runs at 7.40 and spent most of the following season's international fixtures watching from the sidelines as a reserve, playing in only two ODIs.

Edwards started the 2008–09 season by making her top-score in ODIs, 96, in her only innings in the series against India. However, she had a poor WNCL season with the bat, averaging 19.40. Although she began bowling regularly for the first time at senior level, and was successful with 11 wickets, Edwards was dropped from the ODI team, missing the 2009 World Cup and World Twenty20.

In 2009–10 Edwards performed strongly with both bat and ball, scoring 300 runs and taking 14 wickets and was recalled to the national team. She played in all eight ODI matches against New Zealand in the Rose Bowl series at the end of the season, the first time she had played a full series for the national team. Edwards does not bowl regularly at international level as Lisa Sthalekar and Shelley Nitschke—who are also spin bowling all-rounders—are ranked among the top ten bowlers in the world and do most of the slow bowling for Australia. She was a part of the team that won the 2010 World Twenty20, playing in all but one match.

== Youth career ==
Edwards made was selected for the Victorian team for the national Under-19 tournament in January 2000, turning 18 during the early part of the competition. She made 55 in the third match against South Australia and recorded her top-score of 89 against the Australian Capital Territory. The Victorians won all of their seven matches except their round-robin match against New South Wales and the final against the same team. Edwards scored 224 runs at 32.00.

== Domestic debut ==
At the start of the 2000–01 season, Edwards played in two Second XI matches for Victoria against New South Wales. She scored 7 and 46 and earned a call-up into the senior team for the double-header against New south Wales in the Women's National Cricket League (WNCL). She scored 9 and 8 as the Victorians lost both matches. In the last match of the season against South Australia, she made 26 and ended the season with 46 runs at 11.50. At this stage of her career, Edwards played purely as a batsman and did not bowl at all in competition.

Edwards registered her maiden half-century in the first match of the 2001–02 WNCL against Queensland, scoring 64 in a five-wicket win. She went into a form slump after that, failing to reach 15 in her remaining nine innings for the season, including three consecutive ducks. In the last two round-robin matches, against New South Wales, she made only five and seven in consecutive defeats, and when the teams met again a fortnight later for the finals series, she managed 13 and 5 as Victoria lost to the defending champions—who successfully chased down targets in both matches—2–0. Playing in all of Victoria's matches, Edwards ended her season with 119 runs at 11.90. These performances saw Edwards spend almost all of the 2002–03 season out of the state team; she made only one appearance, registering a duck against South Australia. Victoria went on to defeat New South Wales 2–0 in the finals. Up to this point she had a career average of 11.00.

Edwards regained a regular position for Victoria in the 2003–04 WNCL season, but again had little impact in the ten matches. Apart from 24 and 26 in the two matches against Western Australia, she failed to pass 15 in her six remaining innings, which included four scores below five. In one match, she not allowed to bat even after the fall of the seventh wicket, being shielded by her team despite nominally being a specialist batsman. Victoria met New South Wales in the finals, and lost 2–0. Edwards was again ineffective in the finals, scoring three and one. She ended the season with 77 runs at 9.62 and had problems running between the wickets, being run out three times out of eight dismissals.

Despite these consistently poor performances, Edwards was selected in the Australian Under-23 team captained by Leah Poulton that toured Sri Lanka in September 2004 to play the hosts' senior national team. She was not required to bat in the first one-dayer, before scoring 10 and 51 in the latter two fixtures. The visit ended with a first-class match between the two teams, and Edwards top-scored in the first innings with 97 as Australia took a 102-run lead. She made only five in the second innings before taking 1/10 to help seal a 130-run victory.

Edwards returned to Australia and performed much more productively in the 2004–05 WNCL than in previous years. She made 90 before being run out in the first match of the season against Western Australia, setting up a 74-run win. She made 35 in the second match the next day in a nine-wicket victory. In a round-robin match against reigning champions New South Wales, she reached 40 before being run out; Victoria went on to a three-wicket loss. The two teams met again in the finals series and Edwards halted her run of failures in finals. In the first match she made 64 but was unable to prevent a 21-run defeat. She then made 3 and 15 as the Victorians won the remaining finals by five wickets and 50 runs respectively to claim the WNCL. Edwards ended the season with 281 runs at 25.45. However, these performances were not enough for Edwards to win a position in the World Cup team.

== International debut ==
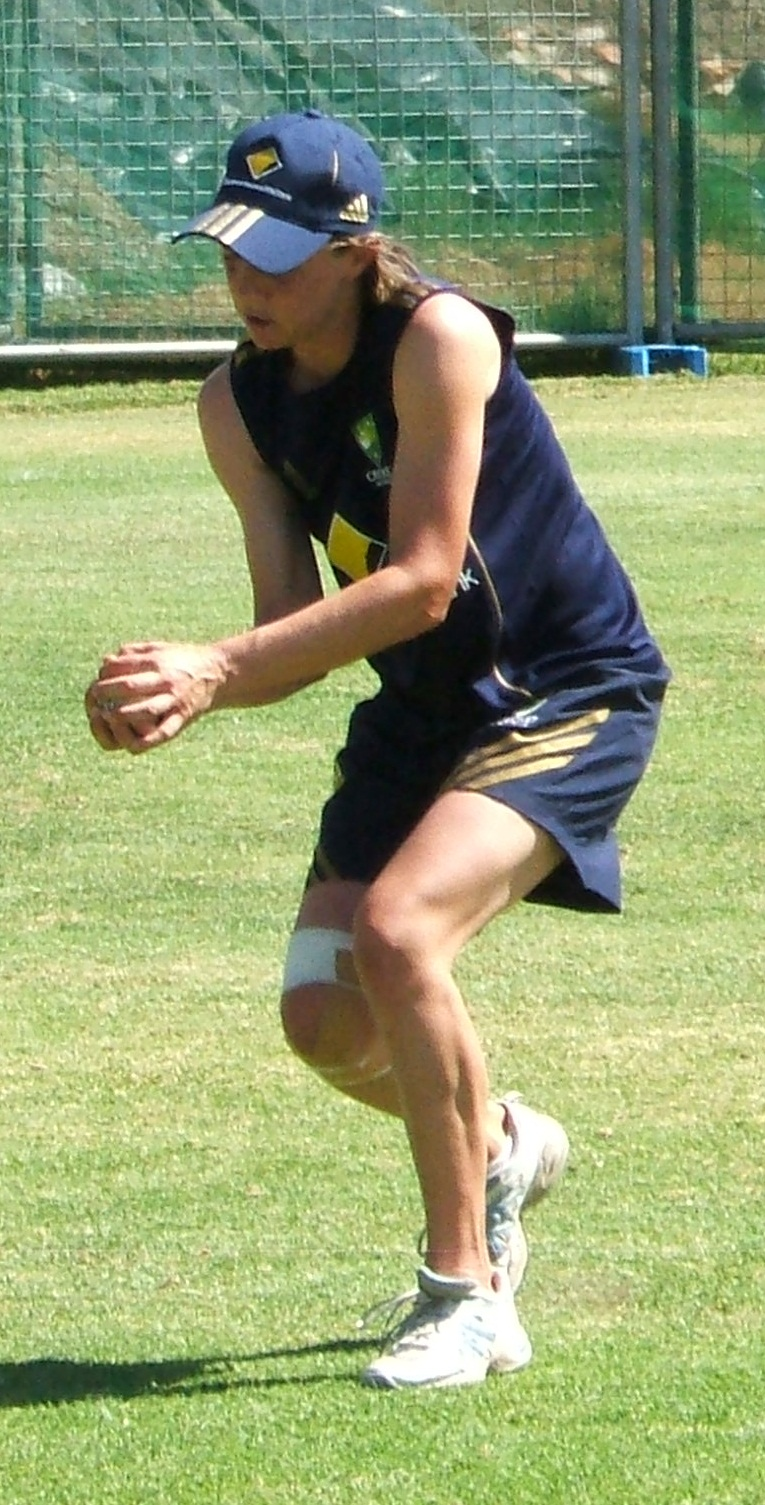
Elliott catching a ball at fielding practice.

After the 2005 World Cup in South Africa, several players retired and vacancies opened up in the national team. Edwards was selected for the senior Australian team to tour England in mid-2005, but spent most of the tour on the sidelines. She did not play in the three One Day Internationals in Ireland at the start of the trip and was overlooked for the two Tests against England. It was not until the fifth and final ODI at the County Ground in Taunton, Hampshire that she made her debut, becoming the 104th woman to represent Australia in One Day International cricket. She neither batted nor bowled; the hosts were all out for 256 and Australia reached the target with four wickets in hand, Edwards not being trusted to bat any higher than No. 9 if necessary, despite playing purely as a batsman. She played in the T20 international the day after, but was again not called upon to bat or bowl in her debut in the format.

During the 2005–06 season, Edwards scored 179 runs at 25.57, playing in all of Victoria's eight matches. Her best score was an unbeaten 72 against New South Wales, which was not enough to prevent a five-wicket defeat. She had earlier hit a 42 in a four-wicket win over South Australia. Victoria won only two of their matches and did not qualify for the final. Edwards was left out of the Australian side for the home ODI series and one-off Test against India held in Adelaide after the season. She was recalled for the five-match home ODI series against New Zealand at the start of the 2006–07 season, and played in the last match. She came to the crease at 5/108 with Australia in difficulty, still requiring a further 96 runs from 116 balls to reach their target of 204. Edwards scored an unbeaten 45 from 48 balls to guide Australia to a four-wicket win with 14 balls to spare in her first ODI on home soil at Allan Border Field.

Edwards performer consistently through most of the 2006–07 WNCL season, reaching 28 in each of her first six innings, including a 51 in a six-wicket win over New South Wales and an unbeaten 52 in another successful run-chase against Western Australia. After making single-figure scores in the last two round-robin matches against Queensland, she played in the three finals, which Victoria hosted after winning six of their eight qualifying matches. She made 22 and 25 in the first two matches and in the deciding match, made 38 before being run out. New South Wales reached the target of 206 with three wickets in hand to defend their title. Edwards ended with 332 runs at 33.20. During the season, Edwards had defensive problems and was bowled in six of her ten dismissals. She also bowled for the first time at senior level, although it was not a success; her only over was hit for nine runs.

After the end of the Australian season, Edwards was selected for the ODI team for a four-nations tournament in Chennai, India. In addition to the hosts and Australia, New Zealand and England were also participating, and each team played each other twice in the round-robin phase. Edwards was allowed to bat at No. 5 at the start of the competition, but failed to make an impression. She made a duck and one in the first two round-robin matches against New Zealand and India, which Australia lost, and was dropped. She was recalled for the final qualifying match, scoring 20 from as many balls as Australia defeated the hosts by four wickets. She was then unbeaten on 8 from 16 balls as Australia defeated New Zealand by six wickets to win the tournament. Edwards ended the Indian tour with 29 runs at 9.66 at a strike rate of 58.00, and was retained for the Rose Bowl series against New Zealand hosted by Australia in the tropical northern city of Darwin in the winter of 2007. She made four in the only T20 match, which Australia won by one wicket/run and continued to struggle in the five-match ODI series. After not being required to bat in the seven-wicket victory in the opening match, she struggled and made two from 21 balls in a 35-run defeat in the second match and was dropped. She was recalled for the fourth match and made six from 15 balls, and was omitted from the final match of the series. In all, she played in seven of Australia's twelve matches for the calendar year and made 37 runs at 7.40 with a strike rate of only 38.54.

== Transformation into an all-rounder and omission from the 2009 World Cup ==
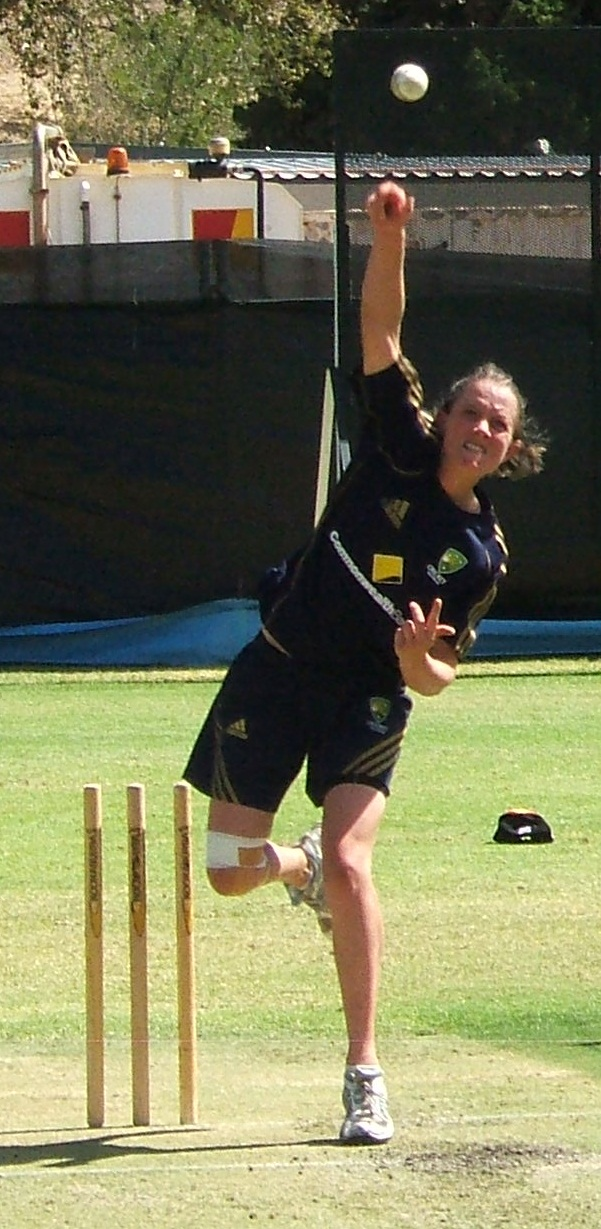
Elliott bowling in the Adelaide Oval nets.

Edwards had a consistent season with the bat in 2007–08, scoring 214 runs at 30.57, playing in all of Victoria's eight matches. Her state won only three of their match and did not make the final. Edwards' best score was an unbeaten 44 in a seven-wicket loss to New South Wales. She also began bowling with regularity for the first time, delivering 23 overs and conceding 91 runs without taking a wicket, an economy rate of 3.95. In two T20 matches for Victoria, Edwards scored 55 not out and took 2/7 from two overs and two catches in a 102-run win over Queensland. She then made 20 in a nine-wicket defeat to South Australia. Just before the start of the Australia's international campaign, she hit an unbeaten 50 and took two catches in a nine-wicket win over the touring England,

These performances earned Edwards a recall into the national side for the bilateral series against England. She was not selected in the one-off T20 match and then was not included until the second ODI at the Melbourne Cricket Ground. She was not required to bat in her first international match in her home town, as Australia made 4/240 won by 84 runs. The third match was washed out and Edwards made 17 from 35 balls in the fourth match at the Sydney Cricket Ground; she batted at No. 8, typically a specialist bowler's position, despite playing purely as a batsman. Edwards was dropped for the final ODI and not selected in the one-off Test against England before the Australians headed to New Zealand for the Rose Bowl series. She made one in the T20 match, which Australia lost by four wickets and did not play in any of the five ODIs.

Edwards was selected for the home series against India before the 2008–09 WNCL. She was not required to bat in a six-wicket Australian win in the T20 match and was not used until the third ODI at North Sydney Oval, where she was allowed to bat at No. 3, the highest position she had occupied in an ODI. She top-scored with 96 from 129 balls including nine fours, to set up a 54-run win. She did not bat in the two remaining matches as Australia's top-order lost no more than three wickets in securing victories in both.

In the first match of the new WNCL season, Edwards struck 65 to set up a 45-run win over South Australia. In the next double-header against Queensland, she had success with the ball for the first time at WNCL or ODI level, taking 3/24 from ten overs to set up a four-wicket win, before taking another wicket in the second match the following day. She then had a prominent role with both bat and ball in the double-header against Western Australia. She scored 45 and took 3/22 to help secure a 47-run victory, before taking 2/34 and making 30 in a six-wicket win the following day. However, she was unable to produce this form against defending champions New South Wales, making a duck and 10 and taking only one wicket in their round-robin matches, both of which were lost. The teams met again in the final the following week, and she made 14 as her team were dismissed for 117. She took 1/11 from five overs as New South Wales won their fourth consecutive WNCL by six wickets. Edwards ended the tournament with only 194 runs at 19.40 and took 11 wickets at 16.27 at an economy rate of 3.37. In two T20 matches, she scored 15 runs at 7.50 and took three wickets at 11.00 at an economy rate of 5.50.

The selectors responded to Edwards' form slump with the bat by dropping her for the 2009 Rose Bowl series and the Women's World Cup held in New South Wales and Canberra. She was also omitted from the team for the World Twenty20 in England in 2009 and the bilateral series hosted by England immediately thereafter.

== International recall ==
The WNCL was expanded in 2009–10 with the addition of the ACT, so ten round-robin matches were scheduled, and Edwards—now competing under her married name of Elliott—played in all but one. Having been dropped from the Australian team the previous season, she started well, making 52 and 30 as Victoria won both matches against Western Australia. She had trouble against New South Wales, making 16 and 11 before running into form against South Australia. She took 3/29 from ten overs in a 108-run win in the first match, before amassing 92 the next day and taking 2/45 in a 67-run win. In the next match against the ACT, she took 3/23 from her quota and then scored an unbeaten 53 to help Victoria avoid a defeat, scraping home by one wicket. Victoria met New South Wales in the final and were denied the title for the second season in a row. Elliott took 2/28 from her two overs and made 17 before being run out as the defending champions won by 59 runs. She ended the season with 300 runs at 33.33 and took 14 wickets at an average of 19.64 and an economy rate of 2.93.

Elliott had a successful time in the domestic T20s, now part of a full interstate tournament, scoring 144 runs at 36.00 and taking 13 wickets at 8.61 at an economy rate of 4.54 in seven matches. Elliott started the tournament by top-scoring with 63 and taking 3/11 from her four overs in a 74-run defeat of Western Australia. Against New South Wales, she scored 52 not out and then took 2/25 from her quota of overs to help secure a seven-run win. In the round-robin stage, Victoria won their first five matches before losing their last fixture against the ACT. They met New South Wales in the final, where Elliott made 17 before taking 1/13 from three overs as New South Wales were bowled out for 75, handing Victoria a 51-run win and the title.

Elliott's performances during the domestic season earned her a recall to the national team for the 2010 Rose Bowl series, and she played in each of the five ODIs during the Australian leg of the competition, and was used almost entirely as a specialist batsman at No. 4, as fellow spin bowling all-rounders Lisa Sthalekar and Shelley Nitschke, ranked in the top five in the world, were used to do most of the slow bowling. Elliott started poorly with single-digit scores in the first two matches at the Adelaide Oval, which Australia won. In the third match of the series at the Junction Oval, she scored 62 of Australia's 7/238, hitting five boundaries in a 101-ball innings. She then took 2/14 as Australia won by 102 runs and took an unassailable 3–0 lead. She did not take another wicket in the series and her only other double-digit score was a 25 from 52 balls in the final match. Elliott ended with 96 runs at 24.00 with a strike rate of 57.14, and two wickets at 10.50 at an economy rate of 2.33 as Australia whitewashed their visitors.

The ODIs were followed by five T20 internationals, three at Bellerive Oval in Hobart and the last two in New Zealand. Elliott played in the first two matches scoring five and seven and taking one wicket in the first match. Australia lost both matches and she was dropped, before being recalled for the final match after two more victories to New Zealand. EElliott was out for four as New Zealand won all the T20 matches.

The competition ended with three ODIs on New Zealand soil, and Elliott scored consecutive half-centuries, 59 and 56 not out in the last two matches in Invercargill. Both matches were won by six wickets and Elliott ended the series with 125 runs at 62.50 in a 3–0 whitewash. Her 59 in the second match came from only 62 balls to help Australia to their target of 256 and her unbeaten 56 the next day took 80 balls. In contrast, her only outing with the ball was not successful, conceding 22 runs from two overs.

=== Test debut (2011) ===
Following her return to international limited-overs cricket, Elliott made her Test debut on 22 January 2011 against England at Bankstown Oval in Sydney. She scored 28 runs in the first innings and 35 in the second.

== 2010 World Twenty20 triumph ==
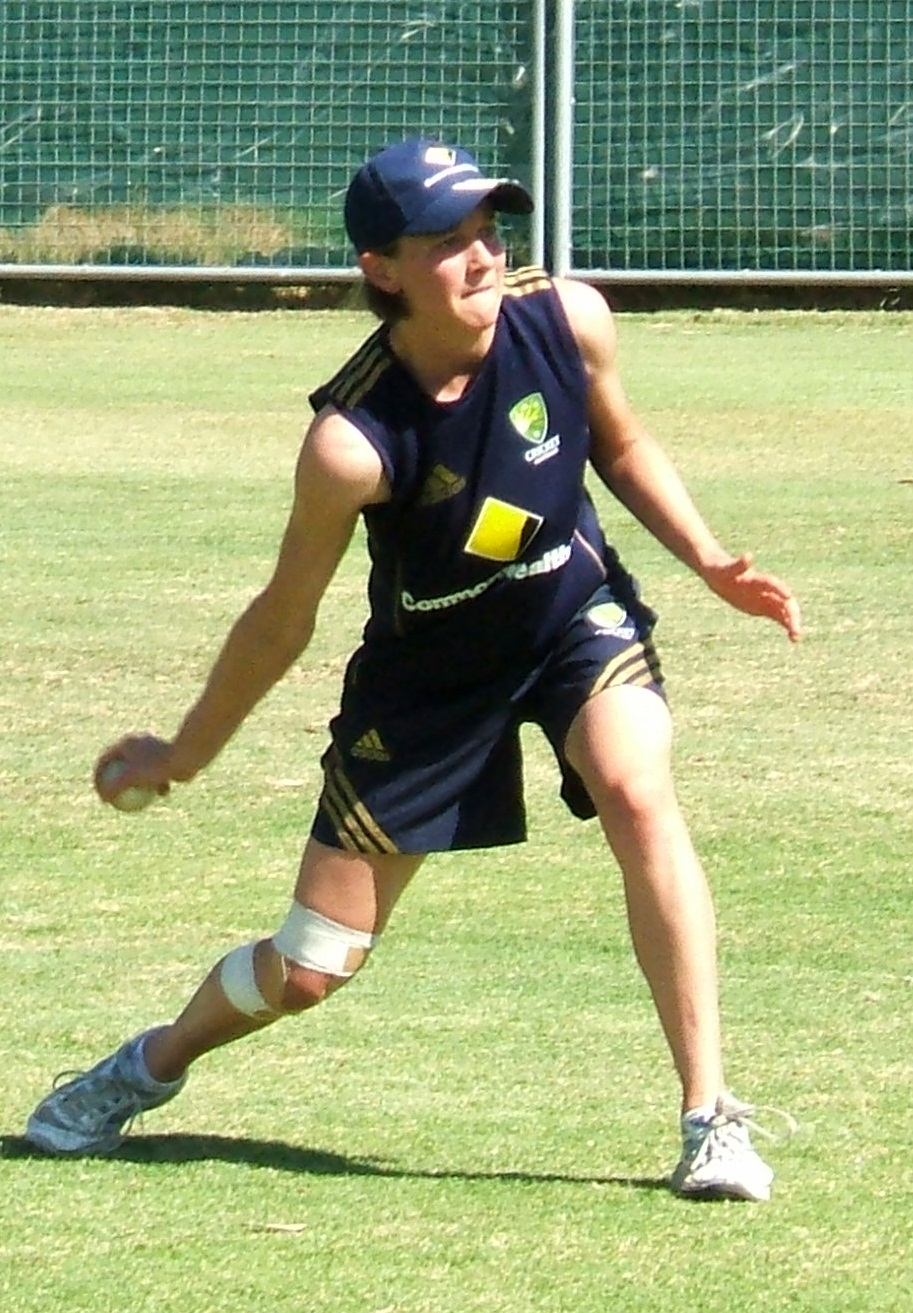
Elliott prepares to throw the ball under arm at a training session.

Elliott was part of the 2010 World Twenty20 winning team in the West Indies and played in all but one of Australia's matches. In the first warm-up match against New Zealand, which Australia lost by 18 runs, Elliott took 1/17 from three overs, removing top-scorer Suzie Bates for 51. She then made 4 from 7 balls at the end of Australia's innings. In the last warm-up match against Pakistan, Elliott came in with two balls remaining and made 2 from 2 balls before being run out from the last ball as Australia made 5/166. She took one catch and did not bowl as Australia won by 82 runs.

Australia were grouped with defending champions England, South Africa and the West Indies. In the first match, Elliott did not bowl as England set Australia 105 for victory. She came in at 4/45 in the 10th over and struggled, scoring 4 from 15 balls before being dismissed. During her time at the crease, Australia lost 3/18 in 29 balls, and by the time she left, they needed 42 runs from 34 for victory with three wickets in hand. Eventually, Australia recovered, before Rene Farrell was run out going for the winning run from the third last ball available, leaving the scores tied.

A Super Over eventuated, and both teams made 2/6, suffering run outs in an attempt to secure a seventh run on the final ball. Australia was awarded the match because they had hit more sixes in the match—Jess Cameron scored the solitary six.

In the next match against South Africa, Elliott came in and made eight runs from six balls before being run out. This was part of a collapse in the death overs and Australia were bowled out for 155 in the last over after losing 6/16. During the run-chase Elliott ran out Alicia Smith. She bowled two overs but was expensive, conceding 22 runs without taking a wicket, as Australia completed a 22-run win.

Elliott had not had an impact with either bat or ball, and for the final group match against the hosts, she was dropped. The specialist off spinner Erin Osborne was brought in to strengthen the bowling. Osborne was not required to bat as Australia finished on 7/133, and was then expensive with the ball, taking 0/20 from two overs as Australia won by nine runs to finish the group stage unbeaten at the top of their quartet.

Australia went on to face India in the semi-final, and Elliott was brought back in place of Osborne. Elliott was required to neither bat nor bowl as the Indians ended with 3/119, which was chased down by the Australians with seven wickets and seven balls to spare.

Australia batted first in the final against New Zealand. A fourth-wicket partnership of 30 between Leah Poulton and Cameron ended with both falling in the space of three balls, bringing Elliott and wicket-keeper Alyssa Healy to the crease with the score at 5/51 in the 13th over. The pair put on 21 runs from 18 balls before Healy was run out attempting a second run after being dropped by Sara McGlashan.

Elliott made 19 not out from 20 balls, and together with Lisa Sthalekar put on 27 from 22 balls before the latter fell in the penultimate over. The Australians ended at 8/106. In the sixth over, Elliott ran towards the leg side from mid-off and caught Suzie Bates who skied a pull shot from Ellyse Perry straight down the ground, as New Zealand collapsed to 4/29 in the eighth over. Australia went on to win by three runs.

== 2013 Women's Ashes and Test century ==
In 2013, Elliott was selected for the Australian tour of England for the Women's Ashes. Accompanied by her husband Rob and nine-month-old son Sam, she became the first mother to tour as a member of the Australian women's cricket team.

During the only Test match of the series at Wormsley Park, Elliott scored her maiden Test century (104 runs) in an innings lasting over eight hours. With this performance, she joined Enid Bakewell and Laura Newton as one of only three women in Test cricket history to score a century after becoming a mother.

=== Final domestic seasons ===
In 2015, Elliott signed with the Melbourne Renegades for the inaugural season of the Women's Big Bash League (WBBL). She later played for the Adelaide Strikers before retiring from domestic cricket in 2017.

== Personal life ==
Elliott's nickname is "Sticksy". She is married to Rob, and they have two sons, Sam and Jacob and a daughter, Jocelyn. Elliott continued to play elite cricket, and work as a physiotherapist, after her children were born. She played her first cricket match as a mother when Sam was six weeks old.
