= Emma Liddell =

Australian cricketer

Personal information
- Born: 30 March 1980 (age 46); Sydney, New South Wales
- Batting: Right-handed
- Bowling: Left-arm medium
- Role: Bowler

International information
- National side: Australia
- Test debut (cap 141): 15 February 2003 v England
- Last Test: 24 August 2005 v England
- ODI debut (cap 95): 20 February 2002 v New Zealand
- Last ODI: 30 August 2005 v England

Domestic team information
- Years: Team
- 1998/99–2005/06: New South Wales

Career statistics
Competition	Test	ODI	LA
Matches	3	33	117
Runs scored	24	3	91
Batting average	12.00	1.50	7.00
100s/50s	0/0	0/0	0/0
Top score	24	2*	35*
Balls bowled	657	1,595	5,806
Wickets	12	32	135
Bowling average	13.00	29.40	23.18
5 wickets in innings	0	0	0
10 wickets in match	0	0	0
Best bowling	4/57	4/17	4/17
Catches/stumpings	0/-	1/–	18/–
- Source: CricInfo, 7 August 2025

Emma Liddell (born 30 March 1980) is an Australian former cricketer.

Liddell played 80 Women's National Cricket League matches for the New South Wales Breakers. She also played three Tests and 33 One Day Internationals for the Australia national women's cricket team. She was the 141st woman to play Test cricket for Australia, and the 95th woman to play One Day International cricket for Australia.

Liddell attended Grantham High School, in Sydney's western suburbs. She took up playing cricket at the age of 14, following her brother into the sport. In February 1996, aged 15, she turned out for a representative Metropolitan West side at the annual New South Wales Combined High Schools Cricket Championships, held in Penrith. On the first day of the tournament, in a match against Metropolitan East, she dismissed the entire opposing side without conceding a run, finishing with figures of 10/0 from 7.4 overs. All her victims were clean-bowled, with the team as a whole scoring only seven runs. The feat is one of the rarest in cricket – only 24 instances have been recorded across all levels of the game, with Liddell the only woman known to have completed it.
