= Women's National Cricket League =

National domestic 50-over competition for women's cricket in Australia

- Countries: Australia
- Administrator: Cricket Australia
- Format: Limited overs cricket (50 overs)
- First edition: 1996–97
- Latest edition: 2025–26
- Next edition: 2026–27
- Tournament format: Round-robin tournament and final
- Number of teams: 7
- Current champion: Queensland (2nd title)
- Most successful: New South Wales (21 titles)

The Women's National Cricket League (WNCL) is the national domestic 50-over competition for women's cricket in Australia. Featuring seven teams—one from every state, plus the Australian Capital Territory—each season's winner is awarded the Ruth Preddy Cup. New South Wales have historically dominated the competition, appearing in the first 24 title deciders and winning 20 championships. The streak of final appearances was broken in the 2020–21 season when they finished in fourth place. Queensland are the current champions.

Beginning in 1996–97, the WNCL replaced the Australian Women's Cricket Championships which had taken place in a two-week tournament format since 1930–31. In conjunction with its Twenty20 counterparts—the more recently established Australian Women's Twenty20 Cup and its high-profile successor, the Women's Big Bash League (WBBL)—the league is cited as a bedrock foundation for developing the standard of women's cricket in the country, helping to produce world-class talent as well as attracting top international players. In particular, it is considered a crucial platform for Australia's young cricketers to further develop their skills and strive for national team selection.

The WNCL has experienced a rising level of professionalism since its inception, though the most notable breakthrough occurred in 2017 when the Australian Cricketers' Association negotiated a watershed deal with Cricket Australia to expand the total female payment pool from $7.5 million to $55.2 million.

== Teams ==
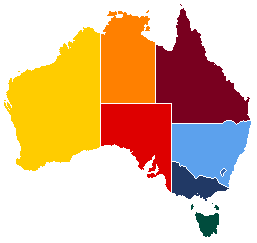
Map of Australia with each state / territory shaded in its cricket team's main colour.

The tournament features seven teams, with matches played across Australia at a combination of bigger venues including the WACA Ground in Perth and Blundstone Arena in Hobart, as well as smaller grounds including CitiPower Centre in Melbourne and Karen Rolton Oval in Adelaide.

Originally a five-team competition, the league was expanded to include the Australian Capital Territory in 2009–10 and Tasmania in 2010–11. Cricket ACT fields a team in the league despite being a non-member association of Cricket Australia.

Team	Nickname	Home ground (Note: Each team has used several venues to host matches. For a full list, see list of cricket grounds in Australia.)	First season	Titles won	Runners-up
Australian Capital Territory	Meteors	EPC Solar Park	2009–10	0	0
New South Wales	Breakers	North Sydney Oval	1996–97	21	5
Queensland	Fire	Allan Border Field	1996–97	2	7
South Australia	SA (Note: Formerly South Australian Scorpions)	Karen Rolton Oval	1996–97	1	5
Tasmania	Tigers (Note: Formerly Tasmanian Roar)	Ninja Stadium	2010–11	3	0
Victoria	Vics (Note: Formerly VicSpirit)	CitiPower Centre	1996–97	2	11
Western Australia	WA (Note: Formerly Western Fury)	WACA Ground	1996–97	1	2

== Results ==
=== Season summaries ===
Season	Champions	Runners-up	Most runs	Most wickets	Player of the Year
1996–97	New South Wales	Victoria	Zoe Goss (VIC) – 629	Jo Garey (NSW) – 15	Zoe Goss (VIC)
1997–98	New South Wales	South Australia	Belinda Clark (NSW) – 611	Karen Rolton (SA) – 14	Belinda Clark (NSW)
1998–99	New South Wales	Victoria	Karen Rolton (SA) – 435	Cathryn Fitzpatrick (VIC) – 14 (Note: Terry McGregor (NSW) also took 14 wickets, but finished with a higher average)	Belinda Clark (NSW)
1999–00	New South Wales	Western Australia	Lisa Keightley (NSW) – 406	Lisa Sthalekar (NSW) – 15	Lisa Keightley (NSW)
2000–01	New South Wales	Queensland	Karen Rolton (SA) – 492	Emma Liddell (NSW) – 17	Karen Rolton (SA)
2001–02	New South Wales	Victoria	Karen Rolton (SA) – 509	Bronwyn Calver (NSW) – 18	Karen Rolton (SA)
2002–03	Victoria	New South Wales	Karen Rolton (SA) – 468	Cathryn Fitzpatrick (VIC) – 17 (Note: Julie Hayes (NSW) also took 17 wickets, but finished with a higher average)	Karen Rolton (SA)
2003–04	New South Wales	Victoria	Belinda Clark (VIC) – 622	Cathryn Fitzpatrick (VIC) – 18	Belinda Clark (VIC)
2004–05	Victoria	New South Wales	Belinda Clark (VIC) – 397	Julie Hayes (NSW) – 19	Karen Rolton (SA)
2005–06	New South Wales	Queensland	Karen Rolton (SA) – 553	Emma Liddell (NSW) – 19	Karen Rolton (SA)
2006–07	New South Wales	Victoria	Kate Blackwell (NSW) – 363	Cathryn Fitzpatrick (VIC) – 25	Melissa Bulow (QLD)
2007–08	New South Wales	South Australia	Karen Rolton (SA) – 384	Renee Chappell (WA) – 14	Lisa Sthalekar (NSW)
2008–09	New South Wales	Victoria	Karen Rolton (SA) – 431	Erin Osborne (NSW) – 15 (Note: Kristen Beams (VIC) also took 15 wickets, but finished with a higher average)	Alex Blackwell (NSW)
2009–10	New South Wales	Victoria	Karen Rolton (SA) – 498	Ellyse Perry (NSW) – 22	Sarah Elliott (VIC)
2010–11	New South Wales	Victoria	Kris Britt (ACT) – 297	Ellyse Perry (NSW) – 13	Kris Britt (ACT)
2011–12	New South Wales	Victoria	Rachael Haynes (NSW) – 402	Lisa Sthalekar (NSW) – 15	Poulton, Sthalekar (NSW)
2012–13	New South Wales	Queensland	Meg Lanning (VIC) – 509	Jude Coleman (QLD) – 18	Bolton (WA), Lanning (VIC)
2013–14	New South Wales	Victoria	Nicole Bolton (WA) – 371	Kristen Beams (VIC) – 14	Nicole Bolton (WA)
2014–15	New South Wales	South Australia	Meg Lanning (VIC) – 440	Amanda-Jade Wellington (SA) – 12	Jess Jonassen (QLD)
2015–16	South Australia	New South Wales	Ellyse Perry (NSW) – 403	Megan Schutt (SA) – 14	Ellyse Perry (NSW)
2016–17	New South Wales	Queensland	Meg Lanning (VIC) – 359	Molly Strano (VIC) – 13 (Note: Amanda-Jade Wellington (SA) and Brooke Hepburn (TAS) also took 13 wickets, but finished with a higher average)	Meg Lanning (VIC)
2017–18	New South Wales	Western Australia	Ellyse Perry (NSW) – 372	Rene Farrell (NSW) – 16	Rachael Haynes (NSW)
2018–19	New South Wales	Queensland	Heather Graham (WA) – 294	Rene Farrell (NSW) – 17	Georgia Redmayne (TAS)
2019–20	Western Australia	New South Wales	Nicole Bolton (WA) – 436	Rene Farrell (NSW) – 21	Nicole Bolton (WA)
2020–21	Queensland	Victoria	Elyse Villani (VIC) – 611	Molly Strano (VIC) – 14	Elyse Villani (VIC)
2021–22	Tasmania	South Australia	Courtney Webb (SA) – 367	Samantha Bates (VIC) – 16	Erin Osborne (ACT)
2022–23	Tasmania	South Australia	Elyse Villani (TAS) – 705	Sarah Coyte (TAS) – 30	Courtney Webb (SA)
2023–24	Tasmania	Queensland	Nicola Carey (TAS) - 696	Grace Parsons (QLD) - 20	Nicola Carey (TAS)
2024–25	New South Wales	Queensland	Tahlia Wilson (NSW) - 667	Amanda-Jade Wellington (SA) – 29	Tahlia Wilson (NSW)
2025–26	Queensland	New South Wales	Katie Mack (NSW) (659)	Lauren Cheatle (NSW) (29)	Katie Mack (NSW)

=== Final(s) summaries ===
==== 1996–2007 ====
From the inaugural season through to 2006–07, the two top-ranked teams on the points table at the conclusion of the regular season would go on to compete in a best-of-three finals series to determine a champion. Dead rubbers were played out in the first two seasons, though such a practice was discontinued thereafter.

Season	Final	1st Innings	2nd Innings	Result	Player of the Finals	Venue
1996–97	Match 1 Scorecard	Victoria; 7/211 (50 overs)	New South Wales; 7/214 (49.3 overs)	New South Wales won by 3 wickets New South Wales led the series, 1–0	Sally Griffiths (New South Wales)	Sydney Cricket Ground; Sydney, NSW
1996–97	Match 2 Scorecard	Victoria; 8/161 (50 overs)	New South Wales; 5/162 (49.1 overs)	New South Wales won by 5 wickets New South Wales led the series, 2–0	Sally Griffiths (New South Wales)	Sydney Cricket Ground; Sydney, NSW
1996–97	Match 3 Scorecard	Victoria; 7/208 (50 overs)	New South Wales; 3/210 (44 overs)	New South Wales won by 7 wickets New South Wales won the series, 3–0	Sally Griffiths (New South Wales)	Sydney Cricket Ground; Sydney, NSW
1997–98	Match 1 Scorecard	South Australia; 8/146 (50 overs)	New South Wales; 4/147 (42.1 overs)	New South Wales won by 6 wickets New South Wales led the series, 1–0	Belinda Clark (New South Wales)	Albert Park; Melbourne, VIC
1997–98	Match 2 Scorecard	South Australia; 8/214 (50 overs)	New South Wales; 6/215 (48.3 overs)	New South Wales won by 4 wickets New South Wales led the series, 2–0	Belinda Clark (New South Wales)	Albert Park; Melbourne, VIC
1997–98	Match 3 Scorecard	New South Wales; 5/223 (50 overs)	South Australia; 8/215 (50 overs)	New South Wales won by 8 runs New South Wales won the series, 3–0	Belinda Clark (New South Wales)	Albert Park; Melbourne, VIC
1998–99	Match 1 Scorecard	New South Wales; 6/153 (50 overs)	Victoria; 146 (48.2 overs)	New South Wales won by 7 runs New South Wales led the series, 1–0	Terry McGregor (New South Wales)	Princes Park; Melbourne, VIC
1998–99	Match 2 Scorecard	New South Wales; 114 (45 overs)	Victoria; 113 (47.3 overs)	New South Wales won by 1 run New South Wales won the series, 2–0	Terry McGregor (New South Wales)	Princes Park; Melbourne, VIC
1999–00	Match 1 Scorecard	New South Wales; 4/154 (30 overs)	Western Australia; 135 (29.4 overs)	New South Wales won by 19 runs New South Wales led the series, 1–0	Terry McGregor (New South Wales)	Sydney Cricket Ground; Sydney, NSW
1999–00	Match 2 Scorecard	Western Australia; 7/218 (50 overs)	New South Wales; 7/219 (50 overs)	New South Wales won by 3 wickets New South Wales won the series, 2–0	Terry McGregor (New South Wales)	Sydney Cricket Ground; Sydney, NSW
2000–01	Match 1 Scorecard	New South Wales; 5/234 (50 overs)	Queensland; 201 (48.3 overs)	New South Wales won by 33 runs New South Wales led the series, 1–0	Emma Liddell (New South Wales)	Bankstown Oval; Sydney, NSW
2000–01	Match 2 Scorecard	Queensland; 137 (49.3 overs)	New South Wales; 3/138 (34 overs)	New South Wales won by 7 wickets New South Wales won the series, 2–0	Emma Liddell (New South Wales)	Bankstown Oval; Sydney, NSW
2001–02	Match 1 Scorecard	Victoria; 133 (50 overs)	New South Wales; 3/134 (42 overs)	New South Wales won by 7 wickets New South Wales led the series, 1–0	Lisa Sthalekar (New South Wales)	Bankstown Oval; Sydney, NSW
2001–02	Match 2 Scorecard	Victoria; 9/186 (50 overs)	New South Wales; 6/187 (49.4 overs)	New South Wales won by 4 wickets New South Wales won the series, 2–0	Lisa Sthalekar (New South Wales)	Bankstown Oval; Sydney, NSW
2002–03	Match 1 Scorecard	New South Wales; 6/200 (50 overs)	Victoria; 7/203 (50 overs)	Victoria won by 3 wickets Victoria led the series, 1–0	Belinda Clark (Victoria)	Melbourne Cricket Ground; Melbourne, VIC
2002–03	Match 2 Scorecard	Victoria; 181 (50 overs)	New South Wales; 141 (47.3 overs)	Victoria won by 40 runs Victoria won the series, 2–0	Belinda Clark (Victoria)	Melbourne Cricket Ground; Melbourne, VIC
2003–04	Match 1 Scorecard	New South Wales; 128 (45.1 overs)	Victoria; 4/129 (48.3 overs)	Victoria won by 6 wickets Victoria led the series, 1–0	Belinda Clark (Victoria)	Melbourne Cricket Ground; Melbourne, VIC
2003–04	Match 2 Scorecard	Victoria; 8/162 (50 overs)	New South Wales; 5/163 (48 overs)	New South Wales won by 5 wickets Series level, 1–1	Belinda Clark (Victoria)	Melbourne Cricket Ground; Melbourne, VIC
2003–04	Match 3 Scorecard	Victoria; 4/217 (50 overs)	New South Wales; 7/218 (48.4 overs)	New South Wales won by 3 wickets New South Wales won the series, 2–1	Belinda Clark (Victoria)	Melbourne Cricket Ground; Melbourne, VIC
2004–05	Match 1 Scorecard	New South Wales; 3/200 (50 overs)	Victoria; 179 (49.1 overs)	New South Wales won by 21 runs New South Wales led the series, 1–0	Julie Hayes (New South Wales)	Bankstown Oval; Sydney, NSW
2004–05	Match 2 Scorecard	New South Wales; 71 (43.4 overs)	Victoria; 5/72 (39.1 overs)	Victoria won by 5 wickets Series level, 1–1	Julie Hayes (New South Wales)	Bankstown Oval; Sydney, NSW
2004–05	Match 3 Scorecard	Victoria; 6/159 (50 overs)	New South Wales; 109 (43.4 overs)	Victoria won by 50 runs Victoria won the series, 2–1	Julie Hayes (New South Wales)	Bankstown Oval; Sydney, NSW
2005–06	Match 1 Scorecard	Queensland; 174 (48 overs)	New South Wales; 2/175 (37.4 overs)	New South Wales won by 8 wickets New South Wales led the series, 1–0	Jude Coleman (Queensland)	North Sydney Oval; Sydney, NSW
2005–06	Match 2 Scorecard	New South Wales; 154 (50 overs)	Queensland; 7/155 (45.1 overs)	Queensland won by 3 wickets Series level, 1–1	Jude Coleman (Queensland)	North Sydney Oval; Sydney, NSW
2005–06	Match 3 Scorecard	New South Wales; 146 (48.4 overs)	Queensland; 144 (47.2 overs)	New South Wales won by 2 runs New South Wales won the series, 2–1	Jude Coleman (Queensland)	North Sydney Oval; Sydney, NSW
2006–07	Match 1 Scorecard	Victoria; 136 (46.3 overs)	New South Wales; 9/137 (48.4 overs)	New South Wales won by 1 wicket New South Wales led the series, 1–0	Cathryn Fitzpatrick (Victoria)	Central Reserve; Melbourne, VIC
2006–07	Match 2 Scorecard	New South Wales; 144 (49 overs)	Victoria; 2/146 (43.2 overs)	Victoria won by 8 wickets Series level, 1–1	Cathryn Fitzpatrick (Victoria)	Central Reserve; Melbourne, VIC
2006–07	Match 3 Scorecard	Victoria; 7/205 (50 overs)	New South Wales; 7/206 (48.4 overs)	New South Wales won by 3 wickets New South Wales won the series, 2–1	Cathryn Fitzpatrick (Victoria)	Central Reserve; Melbourne, VIC

==== 2007–present ====
Coinciding with the introduction of the Australian Women's Twenty20 Cup, the WNCL finals series was reduced to a single match from 2007–08 onward. However, the 2012–13 and 2014–15 seasons utilised an extended four-team playoffs system which included knockout semi-finals.

Season	1st Innings	2nd Innings	Result	Player of the Final	Venue
2007–08	New South Wales vs. South Australia; Match abandoned due to rain		No result New South Wales were declared champions (Note: Higher-ranked finalist awarded the title in the event of a washout)	N/A	Sydney Cricket Ground; Sydney, NSW
2008–09	Victoria; 117 (44.5 overs)	New South Wales; 4/120 (34.2 overs)	New South Wales won by 6 wickets Scorecard	Ellyse Perry (New South Wales)	Sydney Cricket Ground; Sydney, NSW
2009–10	New South Wales; 9/206 (50 overs)	Victoria; 147 (39.1 overs)	New South Wales won by 59 runs Scorecard	Erin Osborne (New South Wales)	Melbourne Cricket Ground; Melbourne, VIC
2010–11	Victoria; 263 (48.5 overs)	New South Wales; 2/193 (34.1 overs)	New South Wales won by 49 runs (Note: D/L method was used to determine winner due to rain interruption); Scorecard	Alex Blackwell (New South Wales)	Sydney Cricket Ground; Sydney, NSW
2011–12	New South Wales; 7/310 ( 50 overs)	Victoria; 240 (41.4 overs)	New South Wales won by 70 runs Scorecard	Rachael Haynes (New South Wales)	Sydney Cricket Ground; Sydney, NSW
2012–13	Queensland; 7/232 (50 overs)	New South Wales; 4/135 (27 overs)	New South Wales won by 15 runs Scorecard	Jodie Fields (Queensland)	Sydney Cricket Ground; Sydney, NSW
2013–14	Victoria; 9/111 (20 overs)	New South Wales; 3/114 (18.5 overs)	New South Wales won by 7 wickets (Note: Match reduced to 20 overs per side due to rain); Scorecard	Rachael Haynes (New South Wales)	North Sydney Oval; Sydney, NSW
2014–15	New South Wales; 4/279 (50 overs)	South Australia; 135 (44.5 overs)	New South Wales won by 144 runs Scorecard	Rachael Haynes (New South Wales)	Blacktown International Sportspark; Sydney, NSW
2015–16	South Australia; 7/264 (50 overs)	New South Wales; 210 (46 overs)	South Australia won by 54 runs Scorecard	Sarah Taylor (South Australia)	Hurstville Oval; Sydney, NSW
2016–17	Queensland; 119 (41.1 overs)	New South Wales; 1/123 (24 overs)	New South Wales won by 9 wickets Scorecard	Rene Farrell (New South Wales)	Allan Border Field; Brisbane, QLD
2017–18	New South Wales; 6/302 (50 overs)	Western Australia; 251 (47.2 overs)	New South Wales won by 51 runs Scorecard	Alyssa Healy (New South Wales)	Blacktown International Sportspark; Sydney, NSW
2018–19	New South Wales; 7/259 (50 overs)	Queensland; 228 (47.2 overs)	New South Wales won by 31 runs Scorecard	Nicola Carey (New South Wales)	North Sydney Oval; Sydney, NSW
2019–20	Western Australia; 231 (50 overs)	New South Wales; 189 (49.5 overs)	Western Australia won by 42 runs Scorecard	Nicole Bolton (Western Australia)	North Sydney Oval; Sydney, NSW
2020–21	Queensland; 8/317 (50 overs)	Victoria; 205 (42.4 overs)	Queensland won by 112 runs Scorecard	Georgia Redmayne (Queensland)	Junction Oval; Melbourne, VIC
2021–22	South Australia; 8/242 (50 overs)	Tasmania; 1/245 (47.4 overs)	Tasmania won by 9 wickets Scorecard	Elyse Villani (Tasmania)	Bellerive Oval; Hobart, TAS
2022–23	Tasmania; 264 (50 overs)	South Australia; 241 (47 overs)	Tasmania won by 1 run Scorecard	Sarah Coyte (Tasmania)	Bellerive Oval; Hobart, TAS
2023–24	Queensland; 7/248 (50 overs)	Tasmania; 4/249(47.4 overs)	Tasmania won by 6 wickets Scorecard	Nicola Carey (Tasmania)	Bellerive Oval; Hobart, TAS
2024–25	New South Wales; 215 (48 overs)	Queensland; 194 (46.5 overs)	New South Wales won by 21 runs Scorecard	Anika Learoyd (New South Wales)	Allan Border Field; Brisbane, QLD
2025–26	Queensland; 7/323 (50 overs)	New South Wales; 6/212 (32 overs)	Queensland won by 7 runs (DLS method); Scorecard	Grace Harris (Queensland)	Cricket Central; Sydney, NSW

== See also ==
- Women's Big Bash League
- Women's cricket in Australia
- Australian Women's Twenty20 Cup
