= England women's cricket team in Australia and New Zealand in 2007–08 =

English women's cricket team in Australia in 2007–08
	Australia	England
- Dates: 25 January – 18 February 2008
Captains	Karen Rolton	Charlotte Edwards

Test series
- Result: England won the 1-match series 1–0
Most runs	Lisa Sthalekar (100)	Claire Taylor (108)
Most wickets	Lisa Sthalekar (4)	Isa Guha (9)

One Day International series
- Results: 5-match series drawn 2–2
Most runs	Alex Blackwell (178)	Charlotte Edwards (140)
Most wickets	Ellyse Perry (9)	Laura Marsh (7)
- Player of the series: Ellyse Perry (Aus)

Twenty20 International series
- Results: Australia won the 1-match series 1–0
Most runs	Kate Blackwell (30)	Claire Taylor (34)
Most wickets	Ellyse Perry (4)	Rosalie Birch; Laura Marsh; Jenny Gunn (1)

The English women's cricket team toured Australia and New Zealand between January and March 2008. In Australia, they were defending the Women's Ashes. The sides won two ODIs each, while Australia won the T20 match. The only Test match played was won by England, who thus defended the Women's Ashes. In New Zealand, the two teams played a five-match ODI series, which was won by England, 3–1.

== Tour of Australia ==
=== Squads ===
Australia	England
Karen Rolton (c); Sarah Andrews; Alex Blackwell; Kate Blackwell; Kris Britt; Melissa Bulow; Leonie Coleman (wk); Sarah Edwards; Shelley Nitschke; Ellyse Perry; Kirsten Pike; Jodie Purves (wk); Emma Sampson; Lisa Sthalekar	Charlotte Edwards (c); Caroline Atkins; Rosalie Birch; Holly Colvin; Steph Davies; Lydia Greenway; Isa Guha; Jenny Gunn; Laura Marsh; Beth Morgan; Charlie Russell; Nicky Shaw; Jane Smit (wk); Claire Taylor; Sarah Taylor (wk)

=== Tour matches ===
==== 50-over match: Victoria v England ====
25 January 2008
Scorecard

England; 137 (48.3 overs)	v	Victoria; 143/1 (35.4 overs)
Jenny Gunn 29 (77); Jane Franklin 2/16 (10 overs)		Rachael Haynes 63* (102); Jenny Gunn 1/20 (5 overs)

Victoria Women won by 9 wickets
Caulfield Grammar School, Melbourne
Umpires: C Stevens (Aus) and Geoff Joshua (Aus)

- Victoria Women won the toss and elected to field.

==== 50-over match: Australia Under-21s v England ====
28 January 2008
Scorecard

Australia Under-21s; 214/8 (50 overs)	v	England; 162 (42 overs)
Jess Duffin 53* (33); Steph Davies 2/28 (10 overs)		Caroline Atkins 32* (66); Rene Farrell 3/22 (6 overs)

Australia Under-21s Women won by 52 runs
Albert Cricket Ground, Melbourne
Umpires: Ashley Barrow (Aus) and Geoff Joshua (Aus)

- Australia Under-21s Women won the toss and elected to bat.

==== 50-over match: Australia Under-21s v England ====
30 January 2008
Scorecard

England; 249/9 (50 overs)	v	Australia Under-21s; 174 (49.3 overs)
Beth Morgan 70 (127); Delissa Kimmince 2/48 (10 overs)		Rachael Haynes 37 (55); Rosalie Birch 3/21 (10 overs)

England Women won by 75 runs
Geelong Cricket Ground, Geelong
Umpires: Ashley Barrow (Aus) and Tony Ward (Aus)

- England Women won the toss and elected to bat.

=== Only WT20I ===
1 February 2008
Scorecard

Australia; 127/5 (20 overs)	v	England; 106/8 (20 overs)
Kate Blackwell 30* (28); Rosalie Birch 1/12 (4 overs)		Claire Taylor 34 (32); Ellyse Perry 4/20 (4 overs)

Australia Women won by 21 runs
Melbourne Cricket Ground, Melbourne
Umpires: Geoff Joshua (Aus) and John Ward (Aus)
Player of the match: Ellyse Perry (Aus)

- Australia Women won the toss and elected to bat.
- Ellyse Perry and Leonie Coleman (Aus) made their WT20I debuts.

=== WODI Series ===
==== 1st ODI ====
3 February 2008
Scorecard

England; 233/6 (50 overs)	v	Australia; 177 (49.2 overs)
Jenny Gunn 48 (64); Shelley Nitschke 2/38 (10 overs)		Ellyse Perry 40 (65); Laura Marsh 3/41 (8 overs)

England Women won by 56 runs
Melbourne Cricket Ground, Melbourne
Umpires: Bob Parry (Aus) and Paul Reiffel (Aus)

- Australia Women won the toss and elected to field.

==== 2nd ODI ====
4 February 2008
Scorecard

Australia; 240/4 (50 overs)	v	England; 156 (45.1 overs)
Alex Blackwell 101 (159); Jenny Gunn 2/39 (9 overs)		Lydia Greenway 27 (41); Ellyse Perry 3/24 (8 overs)

Australia Women won by 84 runs
Melbourne Cricket Ground, Melbourne
Umpires: Bob Parry (Aus) and John Ward (Aus)
Player of the match: Alex Blackwell (Aus)

- Australia Women won the toss and elected to bat.

==== 3rd ODI ====
7 February 2008
Scorecard

Australia	v	England

Match Abandoned
Melbourne Cricket Ground, Melbourne
Umpires: Darren Goodger (Aus) and Rod Tucker (Aus)

- No toss.
- No play possible due to rain.

==== 4th ODI ====
10 February 2008
Scorecard

Australia; 177 (49.2 overs)	v	England; 178/3 (46 overs)
Karen Rolton 65 (71); Nicky Shaw 3/37 (10 overs)		Charlotte Edwards 70* (100); Ellyse Perry 2/24 (8 overs)

England Women won by 7 wickets
Sydney Cricket Ground, Sydney
Umpires: Darren Goodger (Aus) and Rod Tucker (Aus)

- Australia Women won the toss and elected to bat.

==== 5th ODI ====
11 February 2008
Scorecard

Australia; 211/9 (50 overs)	v	England; 170 (46.3 overs)
Alex Blackwell 61 (125); Steph Davies 4/47 (9 overs)		Charlotte Edwards 44 (88); Ellyse Perry 3/30 (8 overs)

England Women won by 7 wickets
Sydney Cricket Ground, Sydney
Umpires: Gerard Abood (Aus) and Rod Tucker (Aus)

- Australia Women won the toss and elected to bat.
- Steph Davies (Eng) made her WODI debut.

=== Test Match ===
15 – 18 February 2008
Scorecard

Australia	v	England
154 (81.5 overs); Kate Blackwell 45 (132); Isa Guha 5/40 (18.5 overs)		244 (140.4 overs); Charlotte Edwards 94 (182); Lisa Sthalekar 3/48 (28 overs)
231/9d (93 overs); Lisa Sthalekar 98 (204); Isa Guha 4/60 (23 overs)		144/4 (56.3 overs); Claire Taylor 64* (142); Ellyse Perry 1/17 (13 overs)

England Women won by 6 wickets
Bradman Oval, Bowral
Umpires: Paul Reiffel (Aus) and Rod Tucker (Aus)
Player of the match: Isa Guha (Eng)

- England Women won the toss and elected to field.
- Ellyse Perry, Emma Sampson, Kirsten Pike and Leonie Coleman (Aus) all made their WTest debuts.

== Tour of New Zealand ==
English women's cricket team in New Zealand in 2007–08
	New Zealand	England
- Dates: 22 February – 3 March 2008
Captains	Haidee Tiffen	Charlotte Edwards

One Day International series
- Results: England won the 5-match series 3–1
Most runs	Sarah Tsukigawa (163)	Claire Taylor (242)
Most wickets	Beth McNeill (8)	Charlotte Edwards (10)
- Player of the series: Claire Taylor (Eng)

=== Squads ===
New Zealand	England
Haidee Tiffen (c); Nicola Browne; Sarah Burke; Rachel Candy; Ingrid Cronin-Knight; Sophie Devine; Lucy Doolan; Ros Kember; Katey Martin (wk); Sara McGlashan; Beth McNeill; Amy Satterthwaite; Sarah Tsukigawa; Aimee Watkins	Charlotte Edwards (c); Caroline Atkins; Rosalie Birch; Holly Colvin; Steph Davies; Lydia Greenway; Isa Guha; Jenny Gunn; Laura Marsh; Beth Morgan; Charlie Russell; Nicky Shaw; Jane Smit (wk); Claire Taylor; Sarah Taylor (wk)

=== Tour matches ===
==== 50-over match: New Zealand A v England ====
22 February 2008
Scorecard

England; 183/9 (50 overs)	v	New Zealand; 86 (37.2 overs)
Claire Taylor 62 (72); Lucy Doolan 3/21 (10 overs)		Rachel Priest 22 (58); Isa Guha 3/9 (6.2 overs)

England Women won by 97 runs
Lincoln No. 3, Lincoln
Umpires: Chris Gaffaney (NZ) and Glenn Holden (NZ)

- England Women won the toss and elected to bat.

=== WODI Series ===
==== 1st ODI ====
24 February 2008
Scorecard

New Zealand; 261/9 (50 overs)	v	England; 138 (40.3 overs)
Nicola Browne 52 (65); Isa Guha 3/47 (10 overs)		Charlotte Edwards 70* (87); Beth McNeill 6/32 (10 overs)

New Zealand Women won by 123 runs
Bert Sutcliffe Oval, Lincoln
Umpires: Glenn Holden (NZ) and Tim Parlane (NZ)

- England Women won the toss and elected to field.

==== 2nd ODI ====
24 February 2008
Scorecard

New Zealand; 242/8 (50 overs)	v	England; 243/1 (44.4 overs)
Sarah Tsukigawa 73 (54); Isa Guha 2/22 (10 overs)		Claire Taylor 111* (111); Beth McNeill 1/38 (10 overs)

England Women won by 9 wickets
Bert Sutcliffe Oval, Lincoln
Umpires: Billy Bowden (NZ) and Evan Watkin (NZ)

- New Zealand Women won the toss and elected to bat.

==== 3rd ODI ====
24 February 2008
Scorecard

New Zealand; 199 (49 overs)	v	England; 200/4 (48.1 overs)
Sarah Tsukigawa 37 (52); Katherine Brunt 2/18 (7 overs)		Sarah Taylor 86* (137); Sarah Tsukigawa 2/29 (10 overs)

England Women won by 6 wickets
Bert Sutcliffe Oval, Lincoln
Umpires: Billy Bowden (NZ) and Chris Gaffaney (NZ)

- England Women won the toss and elected to field.
- Ingrid Cronin-Knight (NZ) made her WODI debut.

==== 4th ODI ====
24 February 2008
Scorecard

New Zealand; 258/9 (50 overs)	v	England
Katey Martin 79 (100); Charlotte Edwards 3/47 (10 overs)

No result
Bert Sutcliffe Oval, Lincoln
Umpires: Chris Gaffaney (NZ) and Derek Walker (NZ)

- England Women won the toss and elected to field.
- No further play possible due to rain.
- Lucy Doolan (NZ) made her WODI debut.

==== 5th ODI ====
24 February 2008
Scorecard

New Zealand; 241/9 (50 overs)	v	England; 242/4 (47.4 overs)
Aimee Watkins 67 (92); Isa Guha 2/24 (8 overs)		Charlotte Edwards 83* (69); Aimee Watkins 3/42 (10 overs)

England Women won by 6 wickets
Bert Sutcliffe Oval, Lincoln
Umpires: Chris Gaffaney (NZ) and Derek Walker (NZ)

- England Women won the toss and elected to field.
