= Australia women's cricket team in England in 2009 =

Australian women's cricket team in England in 2009
	England	Australia
- Dates: 25 June – 13 July 2009
Captains	Charlotte Edwards; Nicki Shaw (first two ODIs)	Jodie Fields

Test series
- Result: 1-match series drawn 0–0
Most runs	Charlotte Edwards (63)	Jodie Fields (148)
Most wickets	Katherine Brunt (7)	Rene Farrell (3)

One Day International series
- Results: England won the 5-match series 4–0
Most runs	Sarah Taylor (226)	Shelley Nitschke (139)
Most wickets	Laura Marsh (9)	Sarah Andrews (8)
- Player of the series: Sarah Taylor (England)

Twenty20 International series
- Results: Australia won the 1-match series 1–0
Most runs	Claire Taylor (31)	Karen Rolton (43)
Most wickets	Holly Colvin; Jenny Gunn; Nicki Shaw (1 each)	Rene Farrell; Erin Osborne (2 each)
- Player of the series: Shelley Nitschke (Australia)

The Australian women's cricket team toured England between 25 June and 13 July 2009, playing one Test match, five One Day Internationals and a Twenty20 International.

Australia won the Twenty20 International, while England won the One Day International series 4–0. The Test match, which was for the Women's Ashes, was drawn; ensuring that England retained them.

== Build-up ==
Prior to the series, both sides took part in the 2009 ICC Women's World Twenty20, which was also held in England in June. England won the tournament, in the process beating Australia by 8 wickets in the second semi-final. The semi-final defeat was Karen Rolton's final game as captain of the Australian side, having announced before the tournament she would be standing down. Jodie Fields was announced as the new captain for the tour of England, with Alex Blackwell as her deputy.

== Squads ==
Squads
Australia	England
Jodie Fields (captain and wicket-keeper, Queensland)	Charlotte Edwards (captain, Kent)
Sarah Andrews (New South Wales)	Caroline Atkins (Sussex)
Alex Blackwell (New South Wales)	Katherine Brunt (Yorkshire)
Jess Cameron (Victoria)	Holly Colvin (Sussex)
Lauren Ebsary (Western Australia)	Lydia Greenway (Kent)
Rene Farrell (Western Australia)	Isa Guha (Berkshire)
Rachael Haynes (Victoria)	Jenny Gunn (Nottinghamshire)
Shelley Nitschke (South Australia)	Danielle Hazell (Durham)
Erin Osborne (New South Wales)	Laura Marsh (Sussex)
Ellyse Perry (New South Wales)	Beth Morgan (Middlesex)
Kirsten Pike (Queensland)	Ebony-Jewel Rainford-Brent (Surrey)
Leah Poulton (New South Wales)	Nicki Shaw (Surrey)
Karen Rolton (South Australia)	Claire Taylor (Berkshire)
Lisa Sthalekar (New South Wales)	Sarah Taylor (wicket-keeper, Sussex)

== Matches ==
=== Twenty20 International ===
25 June 2009
Scorecard

Australia; 151/3 (20 overs)	v	England; 117/6 (20 overs)
Karen Rolton 43* (37); Jenny Gunn 1/24 [3]		Claire Taylor 31 (23); Rene Farrell 2/16 [4]

Australia won by 34 runs
County Ground, Derby
Umpires: Steve Garratt and Peter Willey
Player of the match: Shelley Nitschke (Australia)

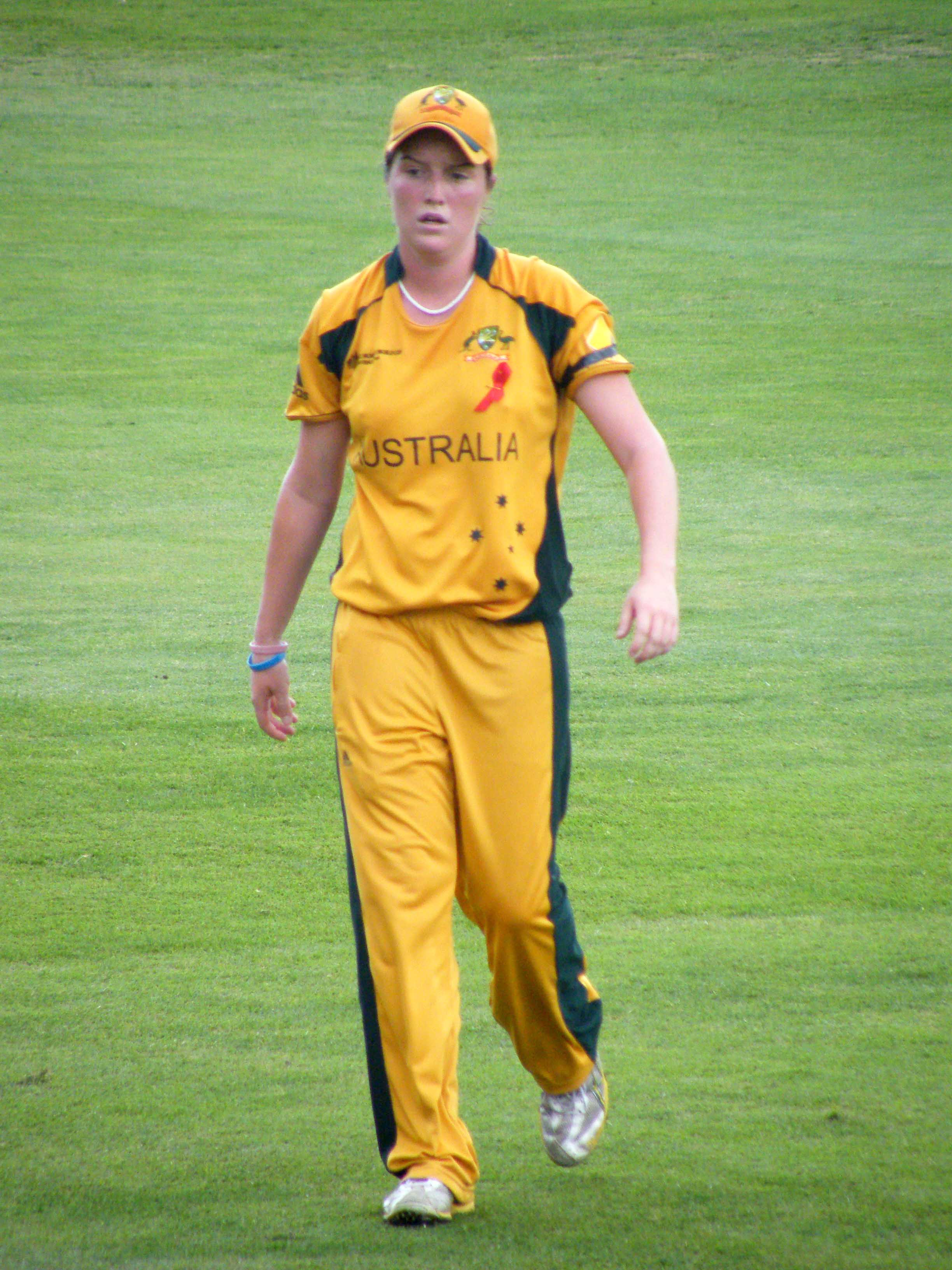
Rene Farrell took two wickets for Australia.

The Twenty20 International between the two sides was played as the first part of a doubleheader at Derby; with Derbyshire's match against Lancashire providing the second half of the entertainment. Australia batted first having won the toss, and recorded a "competitive" total of 151 for 3 from their allocation of 20 overs. Leah Poulton and Shelley Nitschke compiled 55 for the first wicket, a partnership that was described as "momentum-seizing", before Karen Rolton contributed an unbeaten 43 and Lauren Ebsary a 13-ball 24.

England, who had rested bowler Katherine Brunt and batsman Caroline Atkins from the side that had won the World Twenty20 tournament, found their response stifled by Australia's opening bowlers Sarah Andrews and Rene Farrell. The pair accounted for both openers while maintaining an economy rate no higher than five. Claire Taylor, Beth Morgan and Lydia Greenway all briefly threatened, before England's innings closed on 117 for 6.

Shelley Nitschke was awarded the player of the match award, having scored 32 while opening the batting and taking the wicket of Morgan in her economical four-over spell of bowling.

=== One Day Internationals ===
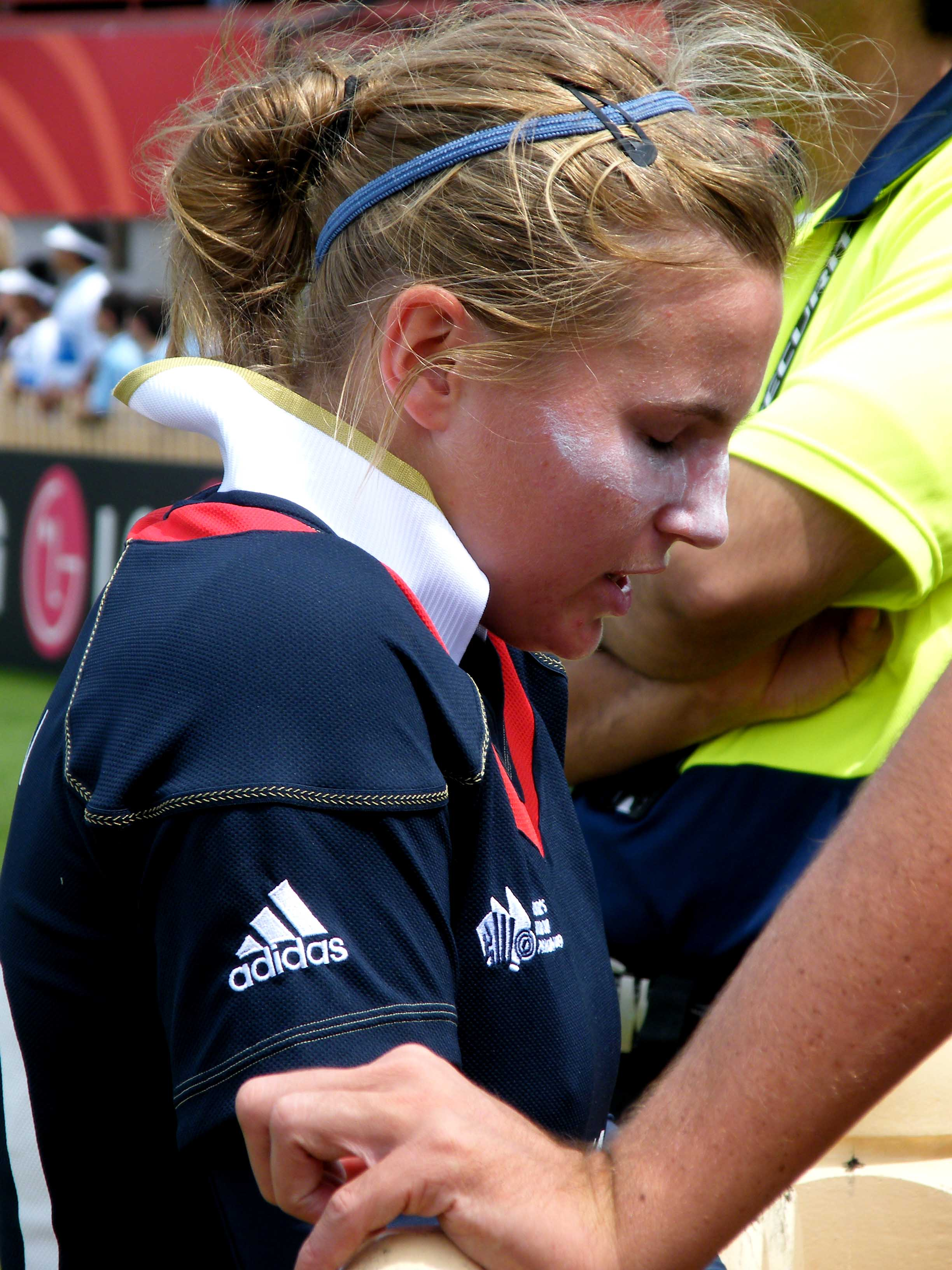
Holly Colvin took three wickets in the first ODI.

England began the One Day International series the strongest, defeating Australia by nine wickets in the first of two ODIs at the County Ground in Chelmsford. Led by vice-captain Nicki Shaw after Charlotte Edwards had fallen ill, England took two quick wickets after being made to field first. Katherine Brunt, returning to the side after missing the Twenty20 International, had Shelley Nitschke caught off of the first delivery of the match, before making Lisa Sthalekar edge the ball to wicket-keeper Sarah Taylor to leave Australia 4 for 2 after the first over.

England's bowlers were rotated regularly, with the introduction of Holly Colvin into the attack proving key. Colvin removed Leah Poulton with a flighted delivery lofted to long on and Ellyse Perry, who was stumped by Taylor to leave Australia 42 for 6. Lauren Ebsary and Rene Farrell helped Australia avoid their lowest-ever total in ODIs by adding 30 for the eighth wicket, before Farrell and Sarah Andrews added a national–record 36 for the final wicket to get Australia to an all out total of 133.

England, by contrast, batted more competently than the Australians, with Taylor and Caroline Atkins barely offering a chance as they moved towards the target of 134. Jodie Fields rotated her bowlers, but the Australian spin bowlers were comfortably played by England. Taylor brought up a half-century in exactly an hour, having faced 55 balls and hit 6 fours, before she was dismissed playing "a loose slog" with England still requiring 15 to win. Her namesake, Claire Taylor, helped Atkins to reach the victory target off the last ball of the 27th over.

29 June 2009
Scorecard

Australia; 133 (49.4 overs)	v	England; 134/1 (27 overs)
Rene Farrell 39* (100); Holly Colvin 3/27 [10]		Sarah Taylor 68 (74); Lisa Sthalekar 1/18 [7]

England won by 9 wickets
County Ground, Chelmsford
Umpires: Neil Bainton and Martin Bodenham
Player of the match: Sarah Taylor (England)

30 June 2009
(day/night)
Scorecard

England; 259/6 (50 overs)	v	Australia; 204 (43.4 overs)
Sarah Taylor 120 (120); Sarah Andrews 2/46 [10]		Shelley Nitschke 47 (52); Laura Marsh 3/33 [10]

England won by 55 runs
County Ground, Chelmsford
Umpires: Steve Garratt and Neil Mallender
Player of the match: Sarah Taylor (England)

3 July 2009
Scorecard

Australia; 150/8 (29 overs)	v	England; 151/8 (29 overs)
Lauren Ebsary 40 (38); Nicki Shaw 2/22 [6]		Caroline Atkins 35 (53); Shelley Nitschke 2/29 [5]

England won by 2 wickets
Stratford Cricket Club Ground, Stratford-upon-Avon
Umpires: Michael Gough and Peter Willey
Player of the match: Lisa Sthalekar (Australia)

- Match reduced to 29 overs per innings due to a wet outfield.

5 July 2009
Scorecard

Australia; 225/7 (50 overs)	v	England; 226/8 (50 overs)
Shelley Nitschke 71 (106); Katherine Brunt 2/38 [10]		Charlotte Edwards 65 (88); Sarah Andrews 4/50 [10]

England won by 2 wickets
Wormsley Park, Buckinghamshire
Umpires: John Holder and David Millns
Player of the match: Shelley Nitschke (Australia)

7 July 2009
Scorecard

Australia; 100/7 (31 overs)	v	England; 6/2 (2.4 overs)
Rachael Haynes 26 (45); Laura Marsh 3/11 [8]		Caroline Atkins 4 (5); Sarah Andrews 1/1 [1]

No result
Lord's Cricket Ground, London
Umpires: Rob Bailey and Nick Cook

- Rain stopped play after 18 overs of Australia's innings, match was reduced to 42 overs per innings. Further rain after 29 overs of Australia's innings reduced the match to 31 overs per innings. A third rain delay occurred 2.4 overs into England's innings, which forced the end of the match.

=== Test match ===
10–13 July 2009
Scorecard

Australia	v	England
309 (113.3 overs); Jodie Fields 139 (254); Katherine Brunt 6/69 [26]		268 (129.3 overs); Beth Morgan 58 (262); Rene Farrell 3/32 [30]
231 (70.1 overs); Alex Blackwell 68 (135 balls); Holly Colvin 3/59 [12.1]		106/3 (53 overs); Charlotte Edwards 53* (96); Ellyse Perry 1/14 [8]

Match drawn
New Road, Worcester
Umpires: Nick Cook and Trevor Jesty

Day 1: Australia won the toss and elected to bat first, quickly lost 5 wickets for 28 runs (Brunt took 4 of these wickets), but Jodie Fields scored 139 runs (her first century) and together with Rachael Haynes broke the record by the sixth partnership with 199 runs. Australia closed the day with 271 for 7, and Katherine Brunt took 5 for 55.
Day 2: Australia only added 38 runs and closed the Innings in 309 runs. England lost their first 4 wickets for 28 runs, and closed the day with 116 runs for 5 wickets, trail by 203 runs.
Day 3: England fell with 268 runs, and Beth Morgan scored 58 runs (her first half century). Australia scored 128 for 1, with Alex Blackwell scored 59 runs (her second half-century), and leading by 169 runs. Karen Rolton scored her run 1,000th (1st Australian, and 10th All-time)
Day 4: With England need a draw, Australia fell with 231 runs (272 ahead) on the second session. England only scored 103 runs, but survived the day and secured the draw, retaining the Ashes. Charlotte Edwards scored 53 runs unbeaten (her 8th half century).

== See also ==
- 2009 Ashes series
