= India women's cricket team in Australia in 2008–09 =

Indian women's cricket team in Australia in 2008–09
	Australia	India
- Dates: 22 October – 9 November 2008
Captains	Karen Rolton	Jhulan Goswami

One Day International series
- Results: Australia won the 5-match series 5–0
Most runs	Alex Blackwell (255)	Mithali Raj (138)
Most wickets	Emma Sampson (8)	Nooshin Al Khadeer (3)
- Player of the series: Alex Blackwell (Aus)

Twenty20 International series
- Results: Australia won the 1-match series 1–0
Most runs	Shelley Nitschke (49)	Mithali Raj (51)
Most wickets	4 bowlers (1)	Gouher Sultana (2)

The India women's national cricket team toured Australia in October and November 2008. They played Australia in 1 Twenty20 International and 5 One Day Internationals. Every international match on the tour was won by Australia.

== Squads ==
Australia	India
Karen Rolton (c); Alex Blackwell; Kate Blackwell; Leonie Coleman; Sarah Elliott; Jodie Fields (wk); Delissa Kimmince; Shelley Nitschke; Ellyse Perry; Kirsten Pike; Leah Poulton; Emma Sampson; Lisa Sthalekar	Jhulan Goswami (c); Nooshin Al Khadeer; Anjum Chopra; Anagha Deshpande (wk); Rumeli Dhar; Thirush Kamini; Reema Malhotra; Sulakshana Naik (wk); Snehal Pradhan; Seema Pujare; Mithali Raj; Priyanka Roy; Amita Sharma; Jaya Sharma; Gouher Sultana

== Tour Matches ==
=== 50-over match: Australia Under-21s v India ===
22 October 2008
Scorecard

India; 72/1 (22.4 overs)	v	Australia Under-21s
Jaya Sharma 42* (70); Jess Jonassen 1/16 (6 overs)

No result
Bankstown Oval, Sydney
Umpires: Gerard Abood (Aus) and Peter Tate (Aus)

- Australia Under-21s Women won the toss and elected to field.
- Match reduced to 30 overs per side.
- No further play possible due to rain.

=== 50-over match: New South Wales v India ===
25 October 2008
Scorecard

India; 227/5 (50 overs)	v	New South Wales; 179 (46.1 overs)
Jaya Sharma 64 (95); Sharon Millanta 2/50 (9 overs)		Laura Wright 96 (129); Seema Pujare 4/27 (8 overs)

India Women won by 48 runs
Bradman Oval, Bowral
Umpires: Marc Nickl (Aus) and Yohan Ramasundara (Aus)

- India Women won the toss and elected to bat.

=== 50-over match: Australia Under-21s v India ===
26 October 2008
Scorecard

India; 231/7 (50 overs)	v	Australia Under-21s; 149 (47.2 overs)
Thirush Kamini 66 (90); Em Preston 3/36 (7 overs)		Jess Duffin 60 (84); Rumeli Dhar 3/15 (7 overs)

India Women won by 82 runs
Bradman Oval, Bowral
Umpires: Terry Keel (Aus) and Yohan Ramasundara (Aus)

- India Women won the toss and elected to bat.

== Only WT20I ==
28 October 2008
Scorecard

Australia; 142/4 (20 overs)	v	India; 140/4 (20 overs)
Shelley Nitschke 49 (39); Gouher Sultana 2/30 (4 overs)		Mithali Raj 51* (45); Lisa Sthalekar 1/21 (4 overs)

Australia Women won by 2 runs
Hurstville Oval, Sydney
Umpires: Gerard Abood (Aus) and Peter Tate (Aus)
Player of the match: Karen Rolton (Aus)

- India Women won the toss and elected to field.
- Delissa Kimmince (Aus), Thirush Kamini, Seema Pujare, Jaya Sharma and Gouher Sultana (Ind) all made their WT20I debuts.

== WODI Series ==
=== 1st ODI ===
31 October 2008
Scorecard

India; 183/6 (50 overs)	v	Australia; 186/2 (37.4 overs)
Jhulan Goswami 46 (45); Emma Sampson 2/34 (10 overs)		Alex Blackwell 75 (101); Rumeli Dhar 1/17 (8 overs)

Australia Women won by 8 wickets
Hurstville Oval, Sydney
Umpires: Gerard Abood (Aus) and Rod Tucker (Aus)

- India Women won the toss and elected to bat.

=== 2nd ODI ===
1 November 2008
Scorecard

Australia; 215/6 (50 overs)	v	India; 129 (45.1 overs)
Lisa Sthalekar 104* (112); Nooshin Al Khadeer 2/47 (10 overs)		Mithali Raj 74 (106); Kirsten Pike 3/29 (8.1 overs)

Australia Women won by 86 runs
Sydney Cricket Ground, Sydney
Umpires: Peter Tate (Aus) and Rod Tucker (Aus)

- India Women won the toss and elected to field.
- Lauren Ebsary (Aus) made her WODI debut.

=== 3rd ODI ===
5 November 2008
Scorecard

Australia; 223/6 (50 overs)	v	India; 169/7 (50 overs)
Sarah Elliott 96 (129); Seema Pujare 2/46 (10 overs)		Thirush Kamini 33 (68); Lisa Sthalekar 4/20 (10 overs)

Australia Women won by 54 runs
North Sydney Oval, Sydney
Umpires: Peter Tate (Aus) and Rod Tucker (Aus)

- Australia Women won the toss and elected to bat.

=== 4th ODI ===
8 November 2008
Scorecard

Australia; 281/3 (50 overs)	v	India; 163 (45.1 overs)
Alex Blackwell 106* (145); Snehal Pradhan 1/46 (9 overs)		Anagha Deshpande 31 (37); Ellyse Perry 3/21 (9 overs)

Australia Women won by 118 runs
Manuka Oval, Canberra
Umpires: Terry Keel (Aus) and Tony Ward (Aus)

- Australia Women won the toss and elected to bat.

=== 5th ODI ===
9 November 2008
Scorecard

India; 177/9 (50 overs)	v	Australia; 178/3 (29 overs)
Priyanka Roy 40 (85); Shelley Nitschke 2/16 (10 overs)		Shelley Nitschke 94 (56); Mithali Raj 2/18 (2 overs)

Australia Women won by 7 wickets
Manuka Oval, Canberra
Umpires: Terry Keel (Aus) and Tony Ward (Aus)

- India Women won the toss and elected to field.
