= Lisa Sthalekar =

Australian cricketer

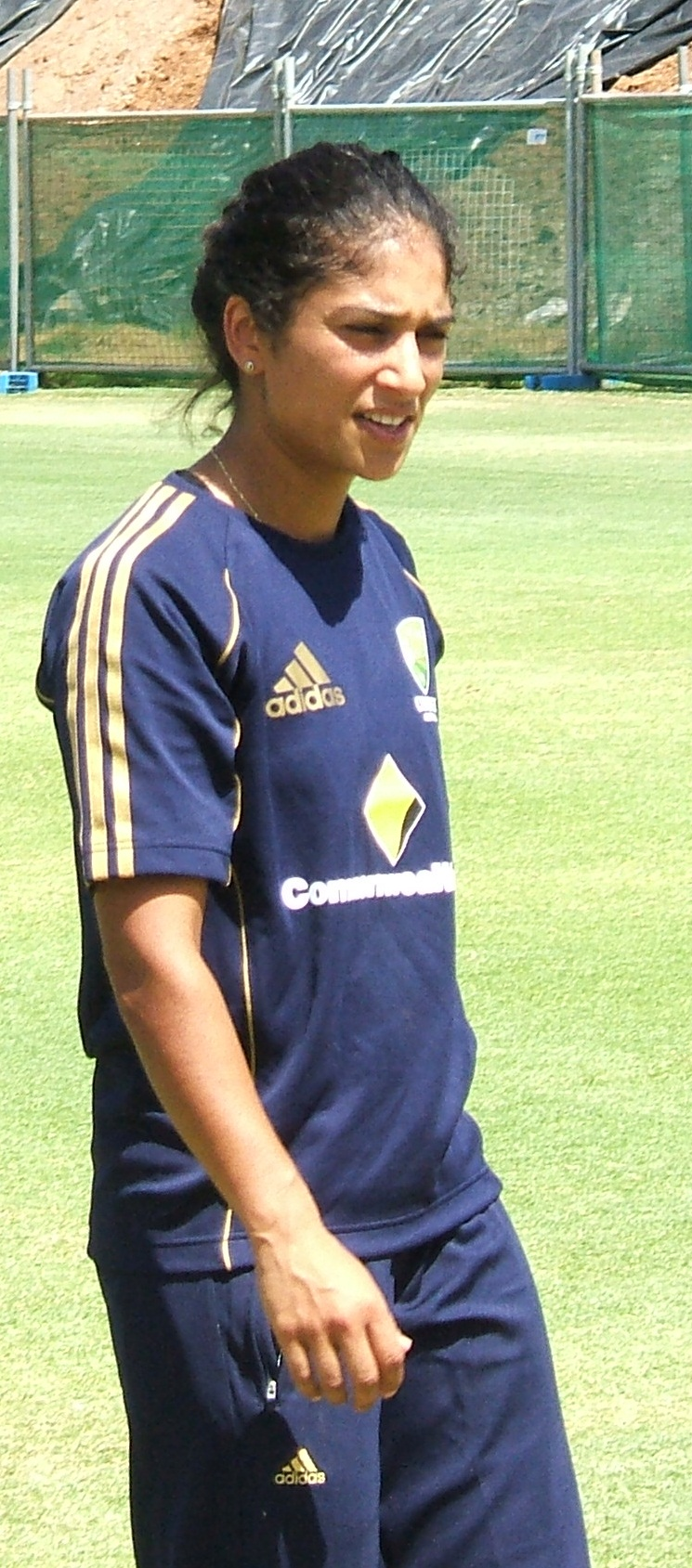

Personal information
- Full name: Lisa Carprini Sthalekar
- Born: 13 August 1979 (age 47); Pune, Maharashtra, India
- Nickname: Shaker
- Batting: Right-handed
- Bowling: Right-arm off break
- Role: All-rounder

International information
- National side: Australia (2001–2013)
- Test debut (cap 143): 15 February 2003 v England
- Last Test: 22 January 2011 v England
- ODI debut (cap 93): 29 June 2001 v England
- Last ODI: 17 February 2013 v West Indies
- T20I debut (cap 11): 2 September 2005 v England
- Last T20I: 24 January 2013 v New Zealand

Domestic team information
- Years: Team
- 1997/98–2012/13: New South Wales
- 2015/16–2016/17: Sydney Sixers

Career statistics
Competition	WTest	WODI	WT20I
Matches	8	125	54
Runs scored	416	2,728	769
Batting average	32.00	30.65	21.36
100s/50s	1/2	2/16	0/1
Top score	120*	104*	52
Balls bowled	1,745	5,964	1,196
Wickets	23	146	60
Bowling average	20.95	24.97	19.35
5 wickets in innings	1	1	0
10 wickets in match	0	0	0
Best bowling	5/30	5/35	4/18
Catches/stumpings	3/–	49/–	16/–
- Source: ESPNcricinfo, 12 January 2020

Lisa Carprini Sthalekar (stə-LAY-kər) (born 13 August 1979) is an Australian cricket commentator and former cricketer and captain of the Australia women's national cricket team. In domestic cricket, she represented New South Wales. She was a right-handed all rounder who bowled off spin, and was rated as the leading all rounder in the world when rankings were introduced. She was the first woman to score 1,000 runs and take 100 wickets in ODIs. She announced her retirement from international cricket a day after the Australian team won the 2013 Women's Cricket World Cup.

Sthalekar made her debut in the Women's National Cricket League (WNCL) late in 1997–98 as a specialist bowler, but had little success, totalling 1/120 in her maiden campaign. She improved her performance over the next two seasons, taking 8 and 15 wickets respectively. In three years, she scored only 169 runs with a best score of 33. In 2000–01 Sthalekar took 11 wickets and scored 112 runs in the WNCL and was called into the Australian team for the first time. Playing as a bowler, she made her One Day International (ODI) debut against England and ended the tour of the British Isles with five wickets from as many matches.

In 2001–02, Sthalekar developed into a frontline batter. She made her first half-century, compiling four in all for the season. She totalled 347 runs, more than her four previous seasons combined, and took 11 wickets as New South Wales won their sixth consecutive WNCL with a clean sweep. Sthalekar struggled with the ball in the next two international seasons, taking only eight wickets in 12 matches, but she did break through with the bat at international level, making three half-centuries in six matches. In early 2003, she made her Test debut against England, and made 120 not out, her maiden century, in her second match, although she took only three wickets in the two Tests.

In 2003–04 and the following season, Sthalekar took 14 wickets apiece and reached 250 runs in each season. In internationals, she returned to form with the ball and averaged more than a wicket per ODI. Sthalekar played in each match of Australia's unbeaten 2005 World Cup triumph in South Africa, taking seven wickets in all, and scoring 55 against India in the final.

After the World Cup, Australia toured the British Isles and Sthalekar made her maiden ODI century against Ireland. She took seven wickets in the two-Test series against England, and upon returning to Australia, made 72 and took 5/30 in an innings win over India. Sthalekar had a strong 2006–07 international season with the bat, scoring 604 runs at 67.11, passing 40 in 9 of her 12 innings, but struggled with the ball, taking 10 wickets at 41.00. In 2007–08, she missed out on a second Test century, falling for 98 in a one-off match against England. She ended the season with consecutive ODI fifties against New Zealand and won the Belinda Clark Award for both 2007 and 2008. She started the following summer with unbeaten scores of 73 and 104 against India, before taking 4/20 in the next match to help set up a clean sweep of the ODI series.

Sthalekar led New South Wales to five consecutive WNCL titles starting in 2005–06. During this period, she averaged over 40 with the bat and just over 20 with the ball, scoring more than 1400 runs and taking 60 wickets. She reached her maiden WNCL century in 2009–10 having ended unbeaten in the nineties on two occasions in the five-year period.

During the 2009 World Cup held in New South Wales and Canberra, Sthalekar was Australia's leading wicket-taker with 13 wickets at 15.69 but struggled with the bat, making 70 runs at 14.00 as Australia lost the third-place playoff to India. In early 2010, Sthalekar took 5/35, he best ODI bowling figures, in her 100th match. Australia defeated New Zealand in all eight ODIs and Sthalekar was prominent with the ball, taking 12 wickets from seven matches. In August 2020, she was inducted to the ICC Cricket Hall of Fame.

== Birth and adoption ==
Originally named Laila at birth, Sthalekar was born in the city of Pune in the western Indian state of Maharashtra. Her biological parents, who were unable to support her, placed her at Shreevatsa, an orphanage attached to Pune's Sassoon Hospital. Haren and Sue Sthalekar, Lisa's adoptive parents, were a couple who lived in Michigan, United States. Haren was born in Bombay and Sue to English parents. The Sthalekars had a daughter and were in India visiting Shreevatsa, hoping to adopt a boy to complete the family. Unsuccessful in their search and about to leave Shreevatsa, it was suggested that they meet Laila. Sue fell in love with her big brown eyes and within a short period of time they decided to adopt her. They thus completed the necessary legal formalities and renamed Laila as Lisa. Three weeks after her birth, Sthalekar's family brought her back to the United States. The family travelled onto Kenya for a period for Haren's work as a Christian missionary before eventually settling in Sydney. Lisa Sthalekar visited Shreevatsa on 3 March 2012.

== Early years ==
Sthalekar was introduced to cricket by her father in backyard games, saying "I think cricket runs in the blood of all Indians." She played against boys initially, and was not aware that females played cricket until her father took her to a women's Test match between Australia and England at North Sydney Oval. She then joined the Gordon club on the North Shore region Sydney; playing with the boys on the weekend mornings before competing with the women during the afternoon.

Sthalekar attended primary schooling at Cherrybrook Public School (playing for West Pennant Hills Cherrybrook Cricket Club), early high school years at Cherrybrook Technology High School and later attended Barker College, a private Anglican school on the North Shore of Sydney. She later completed a Bachelor of Arts at Sydney University, majoring in psychology and religious studies.

== Domestic beginnings ==
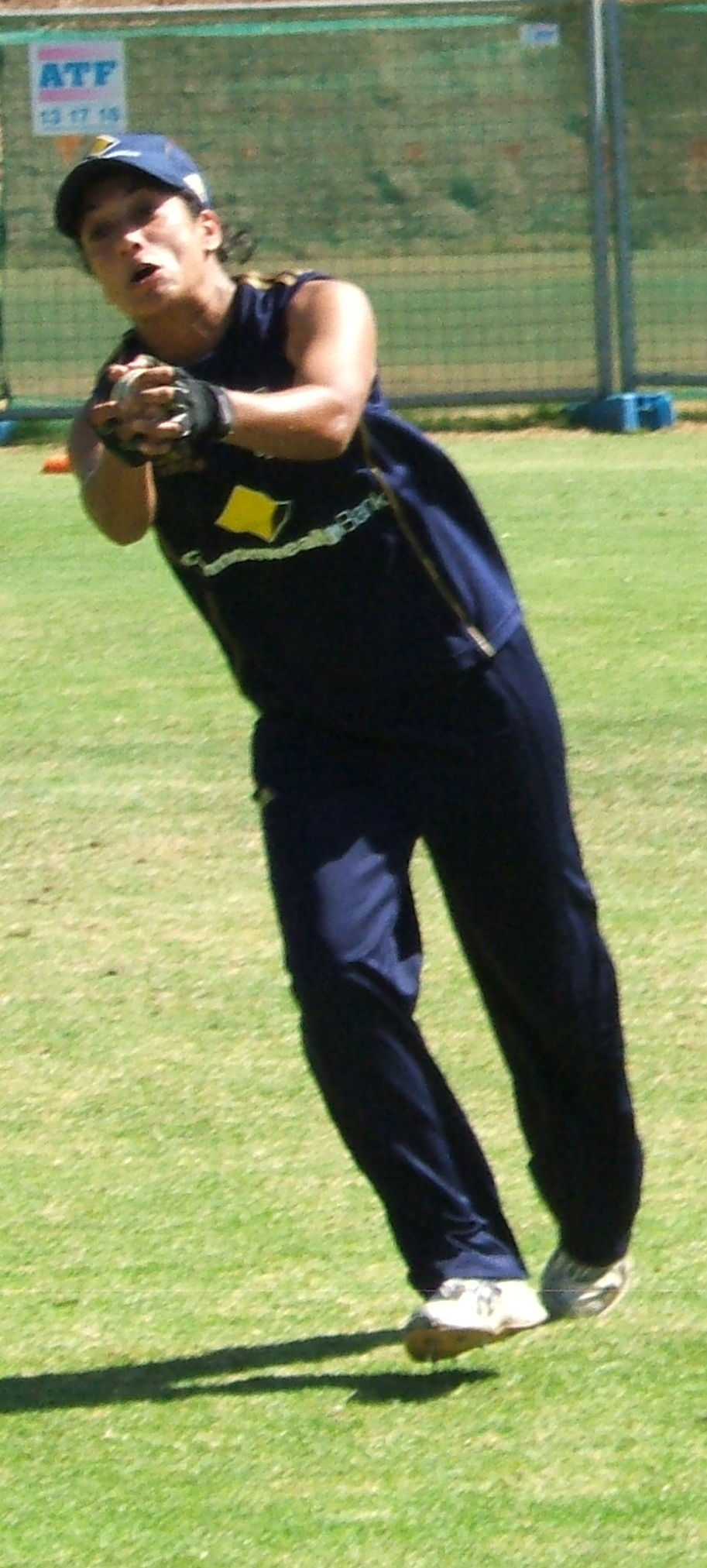
Sthalekar taking a catch at fielding practice

Sthalekar made her debut for New South Wales towards the end of the 1997–98 season, against Queensland. She started as primarily a bowler who batted in the lower order and in her first match took 0/19 from six overs and was not required to bat as New South Wales won by five wickets. She played in five matches including the finals series against South Australia. In the first match, she took 1/22 from ten overs in a six-wicket victory, her maiden wicket at senior level in her fourth match, and in the second final, she only bowled five overs for 0/23. She was unbeaten on six when New South Wales reached their target with four wickets in hand to win the finals 2–0 and win the WNCL for the second year in a row. Sthalekar ended her maiden WNCL series with 25 runs at 25.00 and one wicket at 120.00 at an economy rate of 3.00.

Sthalekar was selected for the Under-23 national team at the end of the season to play a series against New Zealand A. Though economical in three one-dayers, she was not incisive, taking two wickets at 40.50 and an economy rate of 3.00 and scoring 22 runs at 7.33. She had more success in the non-limited-overs two-innings match, scoring 6 and 22 and taking a total of 5/91 in an Australian win. She bowled 62.1 overs for the match.

In 1998–99, Sthalekar had more success in the WNCL. She batted in the middle-order on occasions and scored 76 runs at 19.00 from four innings in seven matches. She took wickets in all but one match, ending with eight at 21.87. New South Wales met Victoria in the finals and Sthalekar scored 33 before being run out and took 2/21 in a seven-run win. It was Sthalekar's best bowling and batting analysis for the season. They then won the next match by one run to seal a hat-trick of WNCL titles, Sthalekar scoring one and taking 1/19 from her ten overs.

In 1999–2000, Sthalekar again had few opportunities with the bat in the middle and lower order as opposition bowlers struggled to make inroads into the New South Wales batting. She scored 68 runs at 34.00 from five innings in ten matches. Sthalekar took 15 wickets at 16.00 at an economy rate of 3.15, including four three-wicket hauls; all four matches ended in a New South Wales victory. All of these came in a period of six matches from the end of October to the start of December and included consecutive three-wicket hauls against Queensland and Victoria. Her best result was a 3/15 to help dismiss South Australia, before scoring 17 not out in a seven-wicket win. New South Wales again made the finals and after taking 2/27 from six overs in a 19-run win over Western Australia in the first match, she took 1/43 from ten overs the next day and made her top-score of the season, compiling an unbeaten 21 in the lower order to help New South Wales to victory by three wickets and claim their fourth successive WNCL, winning all but one of their matches.

At the end of the season, Sthalekar was selected in the Australia Under-21 team to play against New Zealand A. In her first match she scored 81 before being run out, but this was not enough to prevent a five-wicket defeat. The New Zealand attacked her bowling during the match, taking 45 runs from her nine overs without losing a wicket. She took one wicket in each of the next two matches as Australia won by ten and nine wickets respectively, before scoring 27—again run out—and taking 3/39 in the fourth match to help secure a 15-run win. She ended the series with 108 runs at 54.00 and six wickets at 22.50 and an economy rate of 3.46.

In 2000–01, Sthalekar again played in all ten matches of New South Wales' fifth consecutive WNCL title. She struggled in the first three matches, taking only one wicket and scoring 21 runs. In the fourth match, she scored 31 as New South Wales were dismissed for only 174, and took 0/30 from nine overs as Queensland inflicted New South Wales's first loss of the season, by two wickets. After taking 3/23 against Western Australia in the fifth match of the season, she prepared for the finals by scoring 23 and then taking 4/7 from 8.2 overs against Victoria in the last qualifying match, sealing a 69-run win. In the first final against Queensland, she made 43 and conceded only 20 runs from her ten overs as the defending champions dismissed their opponents for 201 to seal a 33-run victory. In the second match, she took 1/18 from her ten overs and fell for a duck as New South Wales won by seven wickets to complete a 2–0 finals series win. The only defeat of the season was a narrow two-wicket loss to Queensland in the fourth match of the season. Sthalekar scored 112 runs at 18.66 and took 11 wickets at 17.45 with an economy rate of 2.25.

== One Day International debut ==
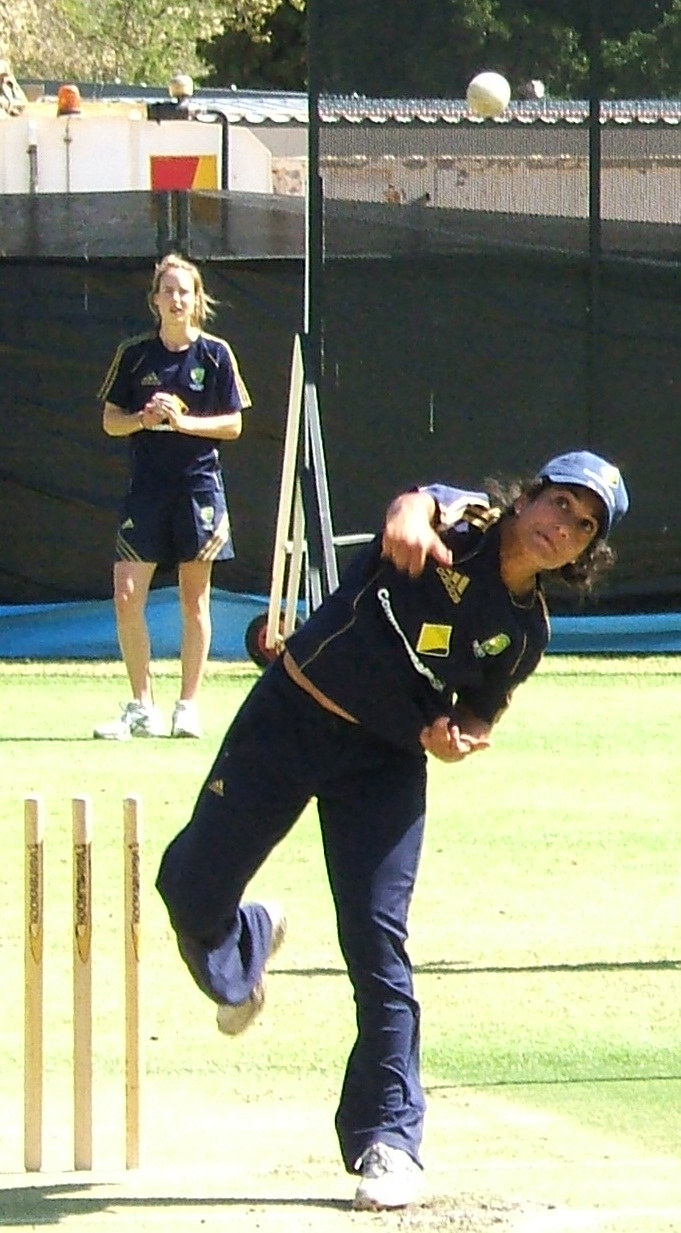
Sthalekar bowling in the Adelaide Oval nets

These performances earned Sthalekar a call-up into the Australian team for the tour of England in mid-2001. She was overlooked for the one-off Test and made her international debut in the first One Day International (ODI) at County Ground, Derby, playing in a specialist bowler's position. She made one not out at the death as Australia batted first and made 7/238. She then took 2/25 from eight overs as the tourists dismissed England to seal a 99-run win. The next ODI at County Ground, Northampton was similar. She made four not out in Australia's 9/227 and took 1/24 from ten overs in a 118-run victory. Sthalekar was then left out of the team for the third and final ODI, so she missed out on the opportunity to play at Lord's, the home of cricket. The Australians then headed west to Dublin, Ireland to play three ODIs against the hosts' national team. Sthalekar played in all the matches and scored eight runs at 4.00 and took two wickets at 26.00 with an economy rate of 3.21, being run out in each match.

The Australians returned home and Sthalekar was part of the New South Wales team that won their sixth consecutive WNCL title in 2001–02, this time with a clean sweep of all ten matches. During the season, Sthalekar's batting reached new heights. She took 2/34 and then scored an unbeaten 80—her maiden WNCL half-century—to see New South Wales to a six-wicket win over Queensland in the third match of the season. In the double-header against Western Australia, she scored 66 and 60, the latter innings terminated by a run out. She later took 2/14 from ten overs to help restrict Victoria to 8/116, handing New South Wales a six-wicket win in their closest match of the season. New South Wales hosted the finals series against Victoria. In the first match, she took 1/16 from eight overs in Victoria's 133 all out and then scored 31 in a seven-wicket win. The next day, she took 2/22 from her 10 overs and then made 68 to set up a four-wicket win. She was not on hand when the target of 187 was reached, having been run out. She ended the season with 347 runs at 38.55 and 11 wickets at 24.00 at an economy rate of 3.14. Sthalekar has scored more runs in one season than she had done in her first four.

At the end of the season, Sthalekar played in four matches for Australia Youth against New Zealand A before the Rose Bowl series against New Zealand. Her batting was not effective, yielding 21 runs at 4.25, but she was incisive and economical with the ball, taking five wickets at 4.80 and economy rate of 1.33. Seven of her 18 overs were maidens. In the Rose Bowl series, Australia hosted three ODIs before travelling to New Zealand for three more matches. Sthalekar performed steadily but unspectacularly during the series. She took one wicket in the first five matches before failing to dismiss anyone in the final ODI, ending with five wickets at 38.00 and an economy rate of 4.31. She scored 88 runs at 17.60, making 33 in the first and last matches. Australia won all but the fourth match of the series.

New South Wales' run of six consecutive WNCL titles came to an end in 2002–03, during which Sthalekar had a mediocre season by her standards, scoring 180 runs at 20.00 and taking eight wickets at 37.37 at an economy rate of 3.35 in ten matches. She took more than one wicket only once, with 2/11 from ten overs against South Australia and had a run of four consecutive single-figure scores in the middle of the season. New South Wales won six of their eight matches and had to play the finals away against Victoria. In the first match, she scored 29 and was then attacked by the home batsmen, taking 1/45 in a three-wicket loss. The next day, she took 1/31 as the hosts were dismissed for 181, but in reply, the defending champions could only make 141 all out, of which Sthalekar made 45.

At the end of the season, Sthalekar competed in a quadrangular ODI tournament held in Lincoln, New Zealand. In addition to the hosts and Australia, England and India were also competing. Each team played two matches against the other three teams in the round-robin phase before the top two teams played off in the final. Sthalekar played in all but the fourth round-robin match, against England, as Australia won all seven matches, defeating the hosts 214 to 105 in the final. Sthalekar was not prominent with the ball, taking three wickets at 51.33, although she remained economical, conceding 3.58 runs per over. However, she was effective with the bat, scoring 59, her maiden ODI half-century, in the first match against New Zealand, before making consecutive half-centuries in the last two qualifying matches, 58 not out and 53 against India and New Zealand respectively. She ended the series with 189 runs at 37.80.

== Test debut ==
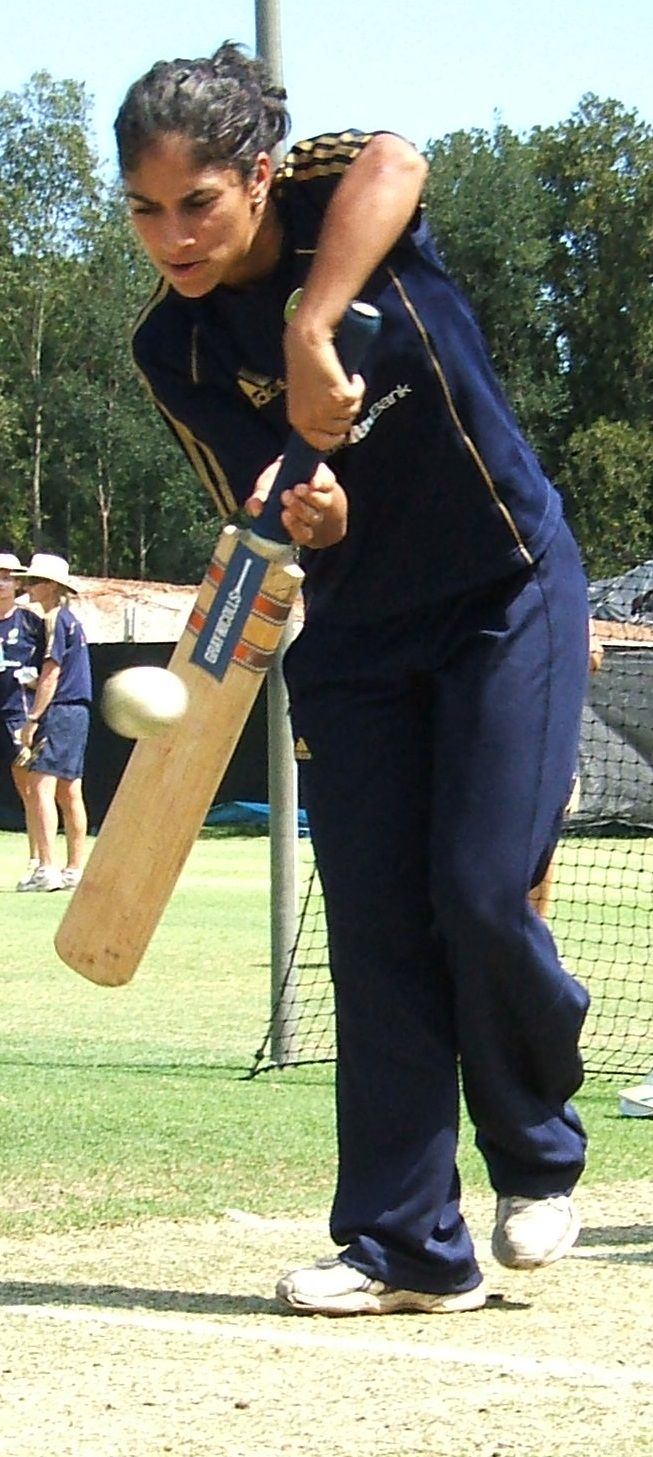
Sthalekar plays a defensive shot in the nets.

Australia then hosted England in two Tests in late February. Sthalekar made her debut in the First Test at the Gabba in Brisbane. She is the 143rd woman to play Test cricket for Australia. In a low-scoring match, she bowled 11 overs, taking 1/8 as the tourists made 124 batting first. Her maiden Test wicket was that of English captain Clare Connor, caught by Cathryn Fitzpatrick. Sthalekar was then given the duty of opening the batting alongside captain Belinda Clark. She was not successful as Australia then collapsed to be all out for 78; Sthalekar made six from 14 balls and occupied the crease for 13 minutes before being trapped lbw by Lucy Pearson in her maiden Test innings. After taking 1/16 from 15 overs, removing Claire Taylor caught behind by wicket-keeper Julia Price, and catching Clare Taylor from Fitzpatrick, England was all out for 92. Sthalekar again opened and this time made a duck, batting for 20 balls and 26 minutes without scoring, but Australia managed to reach 5/139 to seal victory. Of the 26 overs she bowled in the match, half were maidens.

Sthalekar was retained for the Second Test at Bankstown Oval in her home town Sydney, but after her failure as an opener in the preceding match, she returned to her conventional position in the middle-order. In the restructuring in the batting line-up, Kris Britt was called in to make her Test debut as an opener alongside Clark, and middle-order batsman Michelle Goszko was omitted to accommodate Sthalekar. Australia batted first and collapsed to be 3/25, bringing Sthalekar in to join Mel Jones. Sthalekar made 18 from 94 balls, combining with Jones for a 65-run partnership in 99 minutes to steady the innings. She was then dismissed by Pearson, triggering an Australian collapsed to 134 all out, losing their last seven wickets for 44 runs. She then took 0/21 and ran out Kathryn Leng with a throw to Price as the tourists took a 53-run lead. However, Australia's top-order again capitulated, and Sthalekar came to the crease at 3/36; the score then became 4/49 when Jones fell. Sthalekar then combined with Alex Blackwell to take Australia out of trouble, putting on 136 for the fifth wicket before the latter fell for 58. Sthalekar ended with an unbeaten 120, including four fours, from six hours of batting, as Australia declared at 7/259. Sthalekar then took 1/26 from 18 overs, removing Leng lbw, as England ended the match at 6/133 to avoid a defeat.

After a personally and collectively disappointing WNCL in 2002–03, Sthalekar and New South Wales started the new season strongly in the double-header against Western Australia. Sthalekar hit 59 and then took 3/34 in a convincing 82-run win in the opening match. The next day, she brought up her maiden one-day hundred, scoring 108 of 8/284 before taking 2/28 in a heavy 145-run win. However a form slump followed as Sthalekar scored only 39 runs and took one wicket in the next four matches; this included a three-match run included a loss to South Australia and a tie and loss against Victoria. She returned to form in the final double-header against Queensland, contributing 29 and 2/14, and 46 and 2/16, bowling ten overs in both matches as New South Wales won both fixtures by five wickets to qualify second for the finals hosted by the reigning champions Victoria at the Melbourne Cricket Ground. In the first match, Sthalekar scored 5 and took 2/19 from her 10 overs but it was not enough as the hosts reached their target of 129 with six wickets in hand. She took a wicket in each of the remaining matches, which New South Wales won by five and seven wickets respectively to regain the WNCL title, but she contributed little with the bat, scoring 24 and 3. She ended the season with 256 runs at 28.45 and 14 wickets at 17.92 with an economy rate of 2.58 from 11 matches.

Sthalekar was consistent with the ball for the Rose Bowl series, which consisted of three matches each in New Zealand and then Australia. She played in all six matches and took two wickets in three of them, and one wicket in each of the remaining fixtures, ending with nine wickets at 18.44 and an economy rate of 2.91. She was less successful with the bat, scoring 67 runs at 13.40 with a best of 35 as Australia won the series 5–1.

Sthalekar was in good form with the bat at the start of the 2004–05 WNCL. She scored an unbeaten 96 in the second match of the season against Western Australia and in the first four matches had scored 154 runs, being dismissed only twice, one of these times by a run out. She took four wickets in these matches and the season was adjourned for a seven-match ODI tour of her native country India, where the Australians were met by dry spin-friendly surfaces. Sthalekar was prominent with both bat and ball as Australia took the first two matches in Mysore. She had match figures of 34 and 2/31, and 30 and 2/36, bowling ten overs in both matches. The tourists travelled to Mumbai in Sthalekar's home state of Maharashtra, but it was not a successful visit on the field; she was run out for 2 and her 1/19 was not enough to prevent a six-wicket defeat. Australia won the next two matches to seal the series, before the hosts won the remaining dead rubbers. Sthalekar scored 152 runs at 25.33 and took eight wickets at 24.12 and an economy rate of 3.38. Her best score of the series was 43 in the sixth match.

The Australians returned home and the WNCL resumed. Sthalekar took 4/32 against Victoria and 3/33 against Queensland setting up three-wicket wins in both cases. New South Wales met Victoria in the finals and Sthalekar was not successful in the three matches, scoring 16, 4 and 5 taking only two wickets in total as the defending champions lost their title 2–1. In the second phases of the WNCL, Sthalekar did not pass 25 and totalled 86 runs in seven matches. She ended the season with 250 runs at 27.77 and 14 wickets at 21.64 at an economy rate of 3.06.

== 2005 World Cup victory ==
Before the Australians headed to South Africa for the 2005 World Cup, they had a three-match Rose Bowl series against New Zealand in Perth. Sthalekar played in the first and third matches, both won by Australia, but did not play a prominent part in the victories, scoring 12 runs at 6.00 and taking one wicket at 29.00 from 11 overs.

After arriving in South Africa, Sthalekar played in each match of Australia's dominant unbeaten campaign. Each team played the other seven countries once in a round-robin phase before the top four went through to the semi-finals. In the first match, Sthalekar took 1/26 from ten overs as England made 7/169 before rain ended the match. This was followed by an encounter with New Zealand. Sthalekar scored 13 in Australia's 7/174 and bowled four overs without success, conceding 23 runs in a 32-run win. In the third match against the West Indies, she made 17 and took 2/16 from four overs in a 79-run win. This was followed by a 97-run win over the hosts, in which Sthalekar made an unbeaten 22 late in the innings and took 1/26 from seven overs. The group stages ended with two easy victories. Sthalekar took 1/11 from six overs as the opening pacemen did much of the damage in dismissing Sri Lanka for 57. She was then unbeaten on one as Australia reached their target with eight wickets in hand. The match against Ireland was similar. Sthalekar took 1/15 from six overs, and then was allowed to open the batting. She made 28 not out as Australia achieved the target of 67 with all wickets intact. The final pool match against India was abandoned without a ball being bowled due to inclement weather, and Australia met England in the semi-finals. Sthalekar took 1/21 from five overs and then scored 29 before being run out en route to a five-wicket win. In the final against India, she scored 55 as Australia amassed 4/215. She then took 1/18 from four overs and a catch as Australia bowled India out for 117 to win by 98 runs. Sthalekar ended the tournament with 165 runs at 41.25 and 7 wickets at 22.28 and an economy rate of 3.39.

In the northern hemisphere summer of 2005, Australia toured England. They started with a stopover in Ireland, and only the second of the three ODIs went ahead; the other two matches were washed out by persistent rain. Sthalekar cracked 100 not out, her maiden ODI century, as Australia made 3/295 and took a 240-run win. Australia played two Tests in England. In the First Test at County Ground in Hove, Sussex, Sthalekar batted at No. 4 and made three as Australia collapsed to be 7/115 before recovering to end with 355. Sthalekar then took 3/70 as Australia dismissed the hosts for 273 and took an 82-run lead. She bowled Claire Taylor for 41 before returning late in the innings to remove middle-order batsmen Arran Brindle and Rosalie Birch as England lost their last six wickets for 39 runs.

After both Australian openers fell for ducks, Sthalekar joined Karen Rolton at the crease with the score on 2/7 in the second innings. She made 40 from 122 balls and put on a stand of 115 with Rolton before being removed by Katherine Brunt, starting a steady flow of wickets as Australia were all out for 223 to leave the hosts a target of 306. Sthalekar took 3/44 from 30 overs, including 16 maidens, removing captain Connor, Jenny Gunn and Beth Morgan as the hosts hung on for a draw with three wickets in hand. In the Second Test at New Road, Worcester, Sthalekar made 34 and took 1/29, removing Brunt as the hosts made 289 and took a 158-run lead. In the second innings, she fell for a duck in Australia's 232, which left England a target of 75. Sthalekar took 0/4 as the hosts reached the target with six wickets in hand. She ended the Tests with 77 runs at 19.25 and seven wickets at 21.00.

Australia and Sthalekar had more success in the five ODIs. The tourists won the first two matches but the hosts fought back to win the next two. In the deciding match, Sthalekar took 2/54 from her 10 overs and scored 53 as Australia chased down England's 256 with four wickets in hand to seal the series 3–2. Sthalekar had a strong run with the bat, scoring two other scores of 40 or more to end with 140 runs at 28.00. She took six wickets at 25.00 at an economy rate of 4.28.

Sthalekar then played in Australia's inaugural Twenty20 international at the County Ground, Taunton, and only the second international match in the history of the new format. She was not successful; the English batsmen attacked her and she ended with 1/37 from four overs. Australia chased down the target of 152 with seven wickets in hand, but Sthalekar did not contribute with the bat, being dismissed for a duck.

== Ten-wicket Test haul and Belinda Clark Awards ==
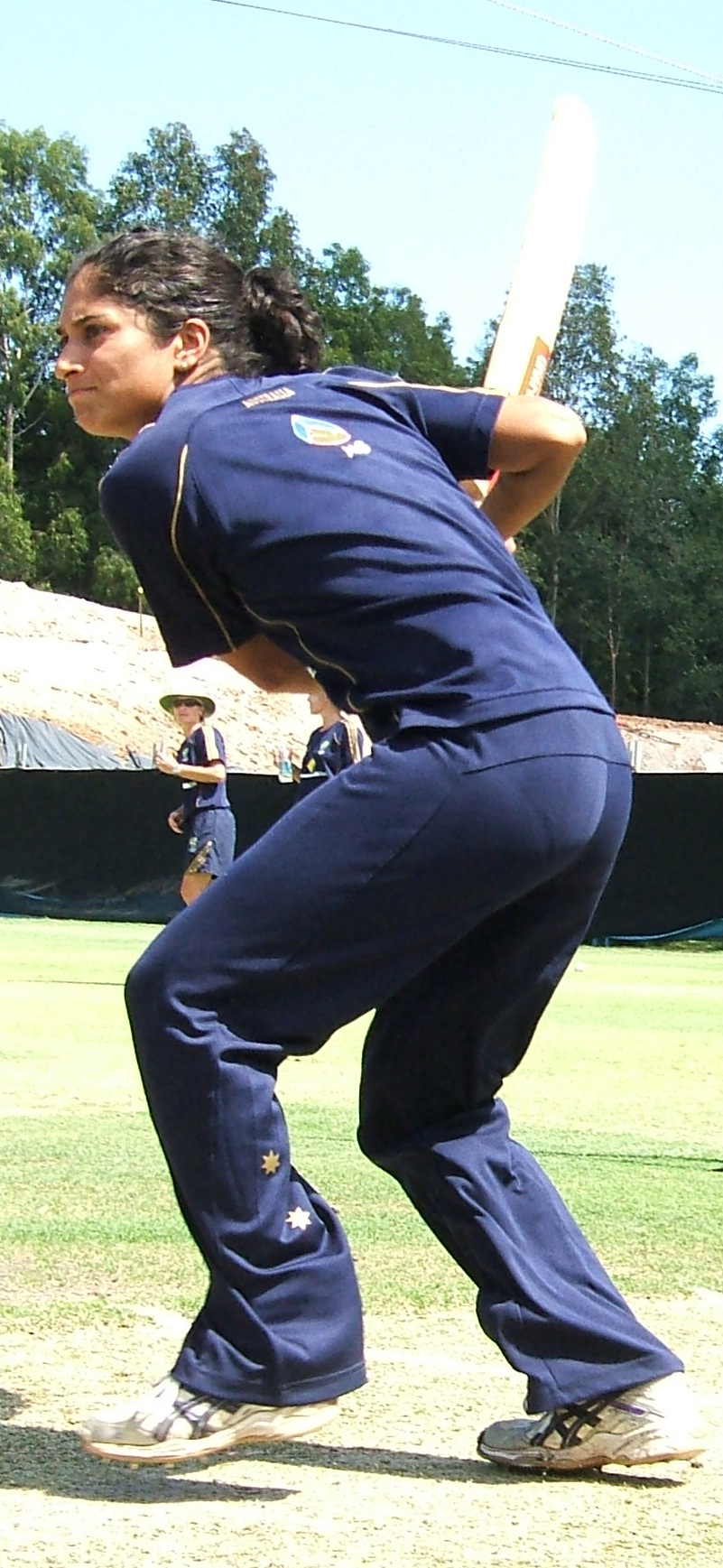
Sthalekar charges down the pitch in preparation for a drive.

Sthalekar had another consistent season in the 2005–06 WNCL, taking 14 wickets at 20.92 and an economy rate of 2.81 and scored 264 runs at 33.00 in 11 matches. Her best bowling figures were a 3/15 in the first match against Queensland and she took at least two wickets in each double-header. New South Wales seven of their eight matches to qualify for the final, where they met Queensland. Sthalekar took 0/27 from her ten overs as Queensland were dismissed for 174 and she was unbeaten without scoring when New South Wales reached the target with eight wickets in hand. The next day, she made 53 as New South Wales capitulated to be all out for 154. She took 1/24 from her ten overs, but it was not enough to prevent a three-wicket defeat. In the deciding match, Sthalekar made 39 of 146 all out and took 2/20 from ten overs as New South Wales hung on by two runs to take the WNCL title.

The Australian season ended with a home series against India in Adelaide. In the one-off Test, the hosts batted first and Sthalekar came in at 2/54 to join captain Karen Rolton. The pair put on 56 runs, the largest partnership of the match, before Rolton was out at 3/110, followed by Kate Blackwell without further addition to the score. Wickets continued to fall regularly until Sthalekar put on 44 with debutant wicket-keeper Jodie Purves before falling herself at 8/213. She ended with the top-score of 72 from 180 balls in Australia's 250. Sthalekar was wicketless as the hosts bowled out the Indians for 93 to take a 157-run first innings lead and enforce the follow on. She then took 5/30 from 20.5 overs to help dismiss the tourists for 153 and seal victory by an innings and four runs. She dismissed captain and leading batsman Mithali Raj before bowling Anjum Chopra to leave the visitors at 3/48. She later returned to take three late wickets, dismissing Sunetra Paranjpe, Jhulan Goswami and Nooshin Al Khadeer as the Indians lost their last five wickets for 25 runs. Sthalekar was named the player of the match for her efforts. Sthalekar played in all three matches as Australia swept the ODIs. She scored 31 runs at 31.00 and took three wickets at 19.33 and an economy rate of 2.93.

The following 2006–07 season started with the Rose Bowl series against New Zealand, which the Australians hosted at Allan Border Field in Brisbane. The five ODIs were preceded by a T20 match, in which Sthalekar took 1/26 from her four overs and scored seven in a tied match. She was consistently productive, making 51, 53, 46, 43 and 17 as Australia took a clean sweep of the ODIs, albeit with one-wicket victories in the first two matches. Two of Sthalekar's dismissals came in run outs, and she ended with 210 runs at 42.00. Her bowling was not so effective, yielding three wickets at 46.66 at an economy rate of 3.50.

Sthalekar had another consistent season in the 2006–07 WNCL. Apart from one wicketless game, she took one or two wickets in each of the seven remaining round-robin matches. New South Wales struggled early in the season, narrowly winning the first match by three wickets against Victoria before losing three matches in a row against the same team and Queensland. Sthalekar failed to capitalise on her starts in these matches, making 40, 27, 31 and 0 as her team averaged 177 in the three losses. New South Wales fought back to win their four remaining matches to qualify for the finals; in the last qualifying match, Sthalekar made 92 not out to guide her team to an eight-wicket win and seal their berth in the deciding matches against Victoria. In the first final, Sthalekar took 1/22 and made nine as New South Wales reached their target of 137 with only one wicket in hand. She then scored three and went wicketless as Victoria squared the series with an eight-wicket the next day. In the deciding final, Sthalekar was attacked by the Victorians, conceding 34 runs from seven overs. In the run-chase, she top-scored with 83 as the defending champions prevailed by three wickets to win consecutive titles. Sthalekar ended the series with 11 wickets at 27.36 at an economy rate of 2.95 and 325 runs at 36.11.

After the end of the Australian season, Sthalekar was selected for the ODI team for a four-nations tournament in Chennai, India. In addition to the hosts and Australia, New Zealand and England were also participating, and each team played each other twice in round-robin phase. In the first match, Sthalekar made 65 as Australia amassed 9/260 but her bowling was attacked by New Zealand, who took 41 runs without loss from her four overs en route to a six-wicket win. Sthalekar made an unbeaten 87 as Australia reached 8/213 against the hosts. She was unable to penetrate the Indian batsmen, taking 0/21 from five overs as they reached the target with three wickets in hand. The next match against England was similar for Sthalekar. She took 1/29 from her five overs as England made 7/216, and then made 85 not out in Australia's six-wicket win, guiding them to the target. Sthalekar scored 45 and took 1/31 in a 49-run win over New Zealand, and the second match against England resembled the first. Sthalekar took 1/44 from her ten overs and then scored 77 to help set up a six-wicket win in pursuit of 269. She continued to be uneconomical in the final round-robin match against India, conceding 64 runs from her 10 overs, but also took three wickets. Sthalekar managed only three but Australia nevertheless won by six wickets to reach the final against New Zealand. There she took 1/32 from eight overs, before scoring an unbeaten 32 and being at the crease when Australia completed a six-wicket win to take the competition.

Sthalekar ended the series with 394 runs at 98.50, her best batting performance in an international series. In contrast, her bowling was neither penetrative nor economical; she took seven wickets at 37.28 at an economy rate of 5.22. For the whole 2006–07 international season, she had scored 604 runs at 67.11 and taken ten wickets at 40.10.

This trend continued in the Rose Bowl series held in tropical Darwin in July 2007, the middle of the southern hemisphere winter. Sthalekar played in the first three of the five matches, scoring 69 runs at 69.00 and taking one wicket at 74.00 at an economy rate of 4.11. In the T20 match that preceded the series, she took 2/15 from her four overs and was out for three as Australia scraped home by one wicket.

After conceding runs at a high rate in international matches in the past year, Sthalekar started the 2007–08 WNCL season in highly economical fashion. In the first match against South Australia, she bowled four maidens and ended with 2/7 from ten overs, helping to restrict New South Wales' target to 166. She then made 56 to lead her team to a seven-wicket win. The next day she took two catches and bowled six maidens in her 2/9 from ten overs in a 25-run win. In the following double-header she was prominent in consecutive defeats of Victoria. After taking 1/29, she scored an unbeaten 93 to steer New South Wales to a seven-wicket win, and then scored 70 and took 2/50 the next day to help seal a 25-run win. She then took 3/20 in the fifth match against Queensland to help ensure a 66-run win. New South Wales went to win all of their reound-robin matches except the final fixture against Western Australia. They qualified first for the final against South Australia and were awarded the final went rain force the match to be cancelled. Sthalekar ended with 312 runs at 44.57 and 12 wickets at 14.58 at an economy rate of 2.73.

The domestic competition was followed by two international series against England and New Zealand. Sthalekar made 17 and took 0/19 from three overs as Australia won the T20 international against England at the Melbourne Cricket Ground. In the ODIs that followed, drawn 2–2, Sthalekar scored 95 runs at 23.75 and took four wickets at 32.00 at an economy rate of 3.85. Her best performance came in the second match at the MCG, scoring 45 before taking 2/40 in an 84-run win. In the one-off Test at Bowral, Sthalekar scored two in the first innings as Australia made 154 batting first. She then took 3/48 from 28 overs as England ended on 244 all out with a 90-run lead. The tourists had been in a much stronger position at 3/216 before Sthalekar took three wickets in three consecutive overs to trigger the loss of the last seven wickets for 28 runs. She had Claire Taylor caught behind by Leonie Coleman for 79, before bowling wicket-keeper Sarah Taylor in her next over for 19. In the following over, a maiden, she bowled Nicki Shaw for a duck. She was the mainstay of the hosts' second innings of 9/231 declared, making 98. Sthalekar had come to the crease with the score at 2/33, before Karen Rolton was out two balls later to leave the score at 3/34. She and Nitschke then rebuilt the innings, putting on 107 runs in 159 minutes before Nitschke was out for 36. Sthalekar then added a further 57 runs from 21.1 overs with Kate Blackwell before she was dismissed two runs short of her century by Beth Morgan, having batted for 204 balls and almost four hours, hitting 14 fours. Australia then lost wickets steadily to leave England with a target of 142. Sthalekar was relatively expensive, taking 1/49 from 13 overs in the second innings and dismissing Morgan as the tourists reached their target with six wickets in hand.

The Australians then headed to Bert Sutcliffe Oval in Lincoln, New Zealand, for a T20 international and five ODIs. Sthalekar made 13 and took 1/12 from three overs as the hosts won the T20 by four wickets. She then made 19 of 5/189 in the first ODI and took 2/25 to help secure a 63-run win. In the next two matches, she made single-figure scores and took one wicket, as the hosts claimed both matches to take the series lead. Australia thus needed to win the remaining two matches. In the fourth match, Sthalekar made 69 and took 2/39 in an Australian win?? In the final match, she was attacked by the local batsmen and conceded 58 runs from 10 wicketless overs. She then made 61 not out to help steer Australia to their target of 250 and a series-clinching eight-wicket win. Sthalekar ended the series with 155 runs at 38.75 and six wickets at 33.00 at an economy rate of 4.38.

The 2008–09 Australian season started with a tour by India. At the start of the season, the International Cricket Council introduced player rankings system for women; Sthalekar occupied the No. 1 all-rounder position ahead of Australian teammate Shelley Nitschke.

Sthalekar started with 1/21 from four overs and 23 in a six-wicket win the T20 match. She was prominent as the hosts completed a 5–0 clean sweep of the ODIs. In the first match at Hurstville Oval, she made 73 not out in an eight-wicket win, before setting up the next match at the SCG with an unbeaten 104. She then took 1/15 in an 86-run win. She then helped Australia gain an unassailable lead in the third match, taking 4/20 from ten overs to help seal a 54-run win, having made 11 not out at the death in Australia's innings. Sthalekar took one wicket in each of the last two matches and ended with seven wickets at 17.71 and an economy rate of 3.01. With the bat, she made 208 runs at 104.00.

When the WNCL started, Sthalekar did not have a heavy workload with the bat. New South Wales won seven of their eight round-robin matches, five of these by seven or more wickets in run-chases. As a result of the effectiveness of the first three batsmen in the order, Sthalekar only had to bat six times in these eight matches, and was twice unbeaten on single-figure scores when the target was reached. Her top-score of 57 not out came in the final match when she guided New South Wales to a three-wicket win over Victoria. By the end of the round-robin phase, she had scored 175 runs and been dismissed only once, in the only match in which her state did not bat last. With the ball, Sthalekar took two wickets in three of the first four matches for a total of seven wickets in those matches, but only took two in the last four matches. In the final, she took 0/29 from seven overs as New South Wales dismissed Victoria for 117. She then made 16 in a six-wicket win. Sthalekar ended the competition with 191 runs at 95.50 and ten wickets at 22.70 at an economy rate of 2.80.

After the WNCL ended, the Australians headed to New Zealand for the Rose Bowl series. In the second match, Sthalekar made 72 and took 2/40 from her ten overs, but it was not enough to prevent a four-run/three-wicket defeat. This left Australia 2–0 down and she took 3/16 and 2/58 in the next two matches to square the series 2–2. The last match was washed out and Sthalekar ended with 79 runs at 26.33 and seven wickets at 19.28 at an economy rate of 4.15. The teams returned to Australia for the one-off T20 match, and Sthalekar took 2/28 from three overs and then scored 23 not out as Australia won under the Duckworth Lewis method. In two warm-up matches against England and Sri Lanka ahead of the World Cup, Sthalekar made 12 and 19 and totalled 0/23 from nine overs.

== 2009 World Cup and World Twenty20 ==
In the opening match of the World Cup campaign, Sthalekar took 2/35 from her ten overs as New Zealand made 205 all out. She then made six as Australia fell short of their target on the Duckworth-Lewis method. Australia then needed to win their two remaining group matches to reach the Super Six phase. Sthalekar made 19 and took 1/27 from ten overs as Australia defeated South Africa by 61 runs. She then scored 15 and took 2/32 from nine overs in a 47-run win over the West Indies. In the first Super Six match, the Indians attacked Sthalekar's bowling although she took three wickets, ending on 3/52 from ten overs. she then made a duck as Australia made 7/218, falling 17 runs of their target. She then missed the win over Pakistan by 107 runs. She returned for Australia's final Super Six match against England, and although the hosts won, it was not enough for them to place in the top two in the standings and qualify for the final. Sthalekar took 2/31 from ten overs and Australia reached the target of 162 with eight wickets in hand and she was not required to bat. In the third-place playoff against India, she made 30 of Australia's 142 after an early collapse, and then took 3/27 from her ten overs, but was not able to prevent a three-wicket defeat. Sthalekar ended the tournament with 70 runs at 14.00 and took 13 wickets at 15.69 at an economy rate of 3.45.

Sthalekar was selected for Australia's team for the inaugural Women's World Twenty20 held in England in 2009. The Australians hosted New Zealand for a three-match series in tropical Darwin at the beginning of June before the World Cup, and Sthalekar played in all the matches with much success, taking 3/12, 3/11 and 2/25 from four overs in each match, equating to an average of 6.00 and an economy rate of 4.00. She added 34 in the third match to help secure a 32-run win and a 2–1 series result. Arriving in the northern hemisphere she took 3/14 from three overs in the team's only warm-up on English soil, a five-run win against the hosts.

However, Sthalekar was not successful in the tournament with the ball. After making 46 in Australia's 8/123, she conceded 18 runs from 20 balls to the New Zealand batsmen in a nine-wicket defeat. She then took 2/23 in four overs against the West Indies before sealing an eight-wicket win with an unbeaten 34. Sthalekar then made one and took 0/13 from four overs as Australia defeated South Africa by 24 runs. This put Australia into the semi-final against England. Sthalekar made 28 but was then attacked by the local batsmen, conceding 23 runs from two overs as England overhauled Australia's score of 5/163 to reach the final, which they won. Sthalekar ended the tournament with 109 runs at 36.33 and two wickets at 38.50 at an economy rate of 5.77.

Sthalekar and the Australians stayed in England for a bilateral series against the hosts, who were the reigning world champions in both ODIs and T20s, after the end of the World Twenty20. She played in all five ODIs, with consistent although unspectacular results. She took a wicket in all but one match and made three scores between 20 and 45. She ended with four wickets at 30.00 at an economy rate of 3.61, and scored 109 runs at 21.80. Her best performance was in the third match at Stratford-upon-Avon, scoring 16 not out before taking 2/31 from six overs in a two-wicket defeat. She ended the series with 34 runs at 17.00.

England won all the ODI matches except the last, which was washed out. Sthalekar played in the one-off Test match at County Road in Worcestershire. She scored six as Australia collapsed to 5/28 before recovering to 309, before taking 1/41 from 26 overs, bowling top-scorer Morgan for 58 to help Australia take a 41-run lead. She was then run out for seven as Australia set the hosts a target of 273 before the match was drawn. She took 1/19 from 13 overs in the second innings, dismissing Claire Taylor as England reached 3/106 to draw the match.

Sthalekar started the 2009–10 WNCL season slowly, going wicketless in two matches against Queensland. She then took three wickets in the two matches against the Australian Capital Territory, scoring 48 and taking 2/27 from ten overs in an upset four-wicket defeat to the new team in their debut season. She made 42 in the next match against Victoria, a five-wicket win, before taking 3/26 and making 27 in a 67-run defeat the next day. Sthalekar then peaked during the double-header against Western Australia. In the first match, she made 108 not out as New South Wales amassed 3/303 and took 1/11 as they completed a 127-run win. The next day, she took 4/14 from her ten overs, helping to dismiss Western Australia for 99 and set up a ten-wicket win. New South Wales won eight of their ten round-robin matches and proceeded to the final against Victoria, Sthalekar scored 49 as the defending champions made 9/206. She then bowled only three overs, taking 0/15 as her state completed another WNCL title with a 59-run win, bowling out the Victorians for 147. Sthalekar ended the season with 348 runs at 49.71 and 13 wickets at 18.15 at an economy rate of 3.18.

During the 2009–10 season, there was a full T20 domestic tournament was introduced. In seven matches, Sthalekar scored 33 runs at 8.25 with a best of 20 against the Australian Capital Territory, and took six wickets at 22.33 at an economy rate of 4.78. New South Wales won five of their six matches and met Victoria—the only team to beat them in the round-robin phase—in the final. Sthalekar took 1/25 from four overs and was out for nine as New South Wales were dismissed for 75 and suffered a 52-run defeat.

After the series, Sthalekar played in the Rose Bowl series against New Zealand, starting with five ODIs in Australia. In the first two matches, held at the Adelaide Oval, she took 3/25 and 2/21 from eight and seven overs respectively as the hosts won both matches. The last three matches of the series were held at the Junction Oval. In the third ODI, Sthalekar took 2/19 from eight overs as Australia took a 102-run win and sealed the series. She went wicketless in the fourth match and was rested from the final game. Australia took a 5–0 whitewash. Sthalekar scored 11 runs at 3.66 and took seven wickets at 15.85 and an economy rate of 3.36.

The ODIs were followed by three T20s at Bellerive Oval in Hobart and two more in New Zealand at the start of the second phase of the bilateral contests. Sthalekar played in every match and Australia was whitewashed, although her bowling remained economical. She took five wickets at 20.60 and an economy rate of 5.46. Apart from conceding 34 from three overs in the first match, her economy rate never exceeded 5.22 in the remaining matches. Sthalekar carried over her unproductive batting into the T20s, ending with 23 runs at 5.75.

Australia then swept New Zealand 3–0 in the ODIs in New Zealand. In the first match, Sthalekar went wicketless and made a duck but Australia able to scrape home by two wickets. The series then ended with matches on consecutive days in Invercargill. Sthalekar was attacked on the first day, conceding 41 runs from seven overs without taking a wicket, before scoring 21 not out in a six-wicket win. The final match the next day was Sthalekar's 100th at international level. She celebrated by taking her maiden five-wicket haul in ODIs, claiming 5/35 from eight overs as well as a catch as the hosts were dismissed for 173. She then made an unbeaten 19 and was at the crease when the winning runs were scored, sealing a six-wicket win. Sthalekar ended the series with 40 runs at 40.00 and took five wickets at 24.00 with an economy rate of 4.80.

== 2010 World Twenty20 triumph ==
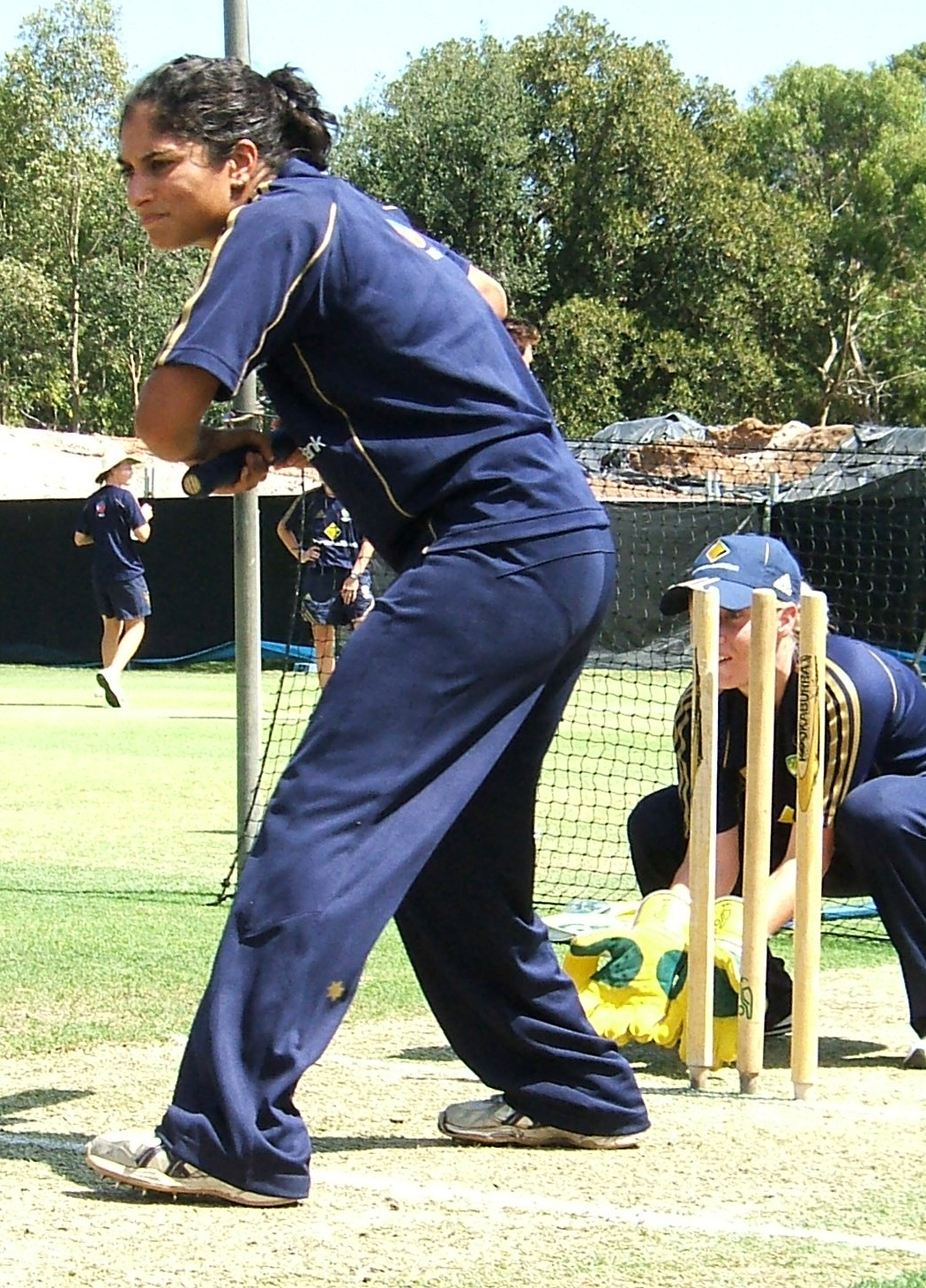
Sthalekar prepares to play a ball.

Sthalekar was part of the 2010 World Twenty20 winning team in the West Indies and played in all but one warm-up match. After being rested from the first warm-up match against New Zealand, which Australia lost by 18 runs, Sthalekar played in the last warm-up match against Pakistan. She did not bat as Australia made 5/166 and took 2/19 from three overs as Australian won by 82 runs.

Australia were grouped with defending champions England, South Africa and the West Indies. In the first match against England, Sthalekar dismissed top-scorer Sarah Taylor in the 12th overs, before removing Jenny Gunn and Danielle Hazell in the 14th and 16th overs. This sparked a collapse as England lost their last seven wickets for 29 runs, including their last four without further addition to the total, as England were dismissed with 15 balls unused. In pursuit of 105 for victory, Australia had lost momentum and lost 3/3 in 16 balls before Sthalekar, who had come in at No. 8, was joined at the crease by Alyssa Healy with the score on 7/63 and 42 runs needed from 34 balls. The pair put on 23 from 13 balls to help regain the initiative before Healy was out. Sthalekar was then out for 10 from 11 balls, leaving Australia at 9/97, with eight runs required from the last seven balls. Australia seven runs from the next four balls before Rene Farrell was run out going for the winning run from the third last ball available, leaving the scores tied.

A Super Over eventuated, and both teams ended with 2/6 after both suffered run outs in an attempt to secure a seventh run on the final ball. Australia was awarded the match because they had hit more sixes in the match—Jess Cameron scored the solitary six. Sthalekar was named the player of the match.

In the next match against South Africa, Sthalekar batted at No. 10 and came in late in the innings as Australia collapsed in the final overs and lost 6/16 including the last four wickets for four runs to be all out for 155 with three balls unused. Sthalekar faced one ball and was run out for a duck. She then took 1/23 from her four overs, taking one catch and dismissing Dane van Niekerk from the last ball of the match as Australia completed a 22-run win.

In the final group match against the hosts, Sthalekar came in at 5/86 in the 14th over and batted until the end of the innings, finishing unbeaten on 23 from 23 balls as Australia finished on 7/133. She took 1/20 from her four overs, dismissing Shanel Daley as Australia won by nine runs to finish the group stage unbeaten at the top of their quartet.

Australia went on to face India in the semi-final. Sthalekar took 1/25 from her four overs, dismissing leading Indian batsman Mithali Raj. She was not required to bat as the Australians reached their target of 120 with seven wickets and seven balls to spare.

Australia batted first and Sthalekar came in with the score at 6/72 in the 16th over to join Sarah Elliott. The pair put on 27 from 22 balls. Sthalekar scored 18 from 13 balls, including two boundaries, before being bowled by Sophie Devine after moving across outside off stump and trying to paddle scoop the ball down to fine leg in the 19th over. Sthalekar was the only Australian to score at faster than a run a ball as the team ended with 8/106.

New Zealand fell to be 4/29 in the eighth over, and during the subsequent period, Nitschke and Sthalekar tied them down with spin as they tried to consolidate. Sthalekar did not take a wicket but conceded only 19 runs from her four overs. Devine required five runs from the last ball to win and she struck a powerful straight drive from the bowling of Ellyse Perry, who stuck out her right foot. The ball deflected to mid-on where Sthalekar stopped it and restricted the scoring to a single, sealing an Australian win by three runs.

== International centuries ==
Test centuries
Runs	Match	Opponents	City	Venue	Year
120*	2	England	Sydney, Australia	Bankstown Oval	2003

One-Day International centuries
Runs	Match	Opponents	City	Venue	Year
100*	41	Ireland	Dublin, Ireland	Claremont Road Cricket Ground	2005
104*	75	India	Sydney, Australia	Sydney Cricket Ground	2008

== Records and Trivia ==
- She was the first player to achieve the double of 1000 runs and 100 wickets in Women's One Day Internationals.
- She has worked as a commentator since her retirement.
- She hosted Channel Seven's late-night coverage of the 2020 Tokyo Olympics alongside Andy Maher and Andrew Gaze.

== Awards ==
- Belinda Clark Award – 2007, 2008
- Sport Australia Hall of Fame as an athlete member - 2026.

== Personal life ==
Sthalekar's nickname is "Shaker", "... because there have been so many mispronunciations of my name the girls were one day mucking around and stumbled on this one...it has just stuck ever since."

== See also ==
- List of centuries in women's One Day International cricket
- List of centuries in women's Test cricket
