= Alex Blackwell =

Australian cricketer

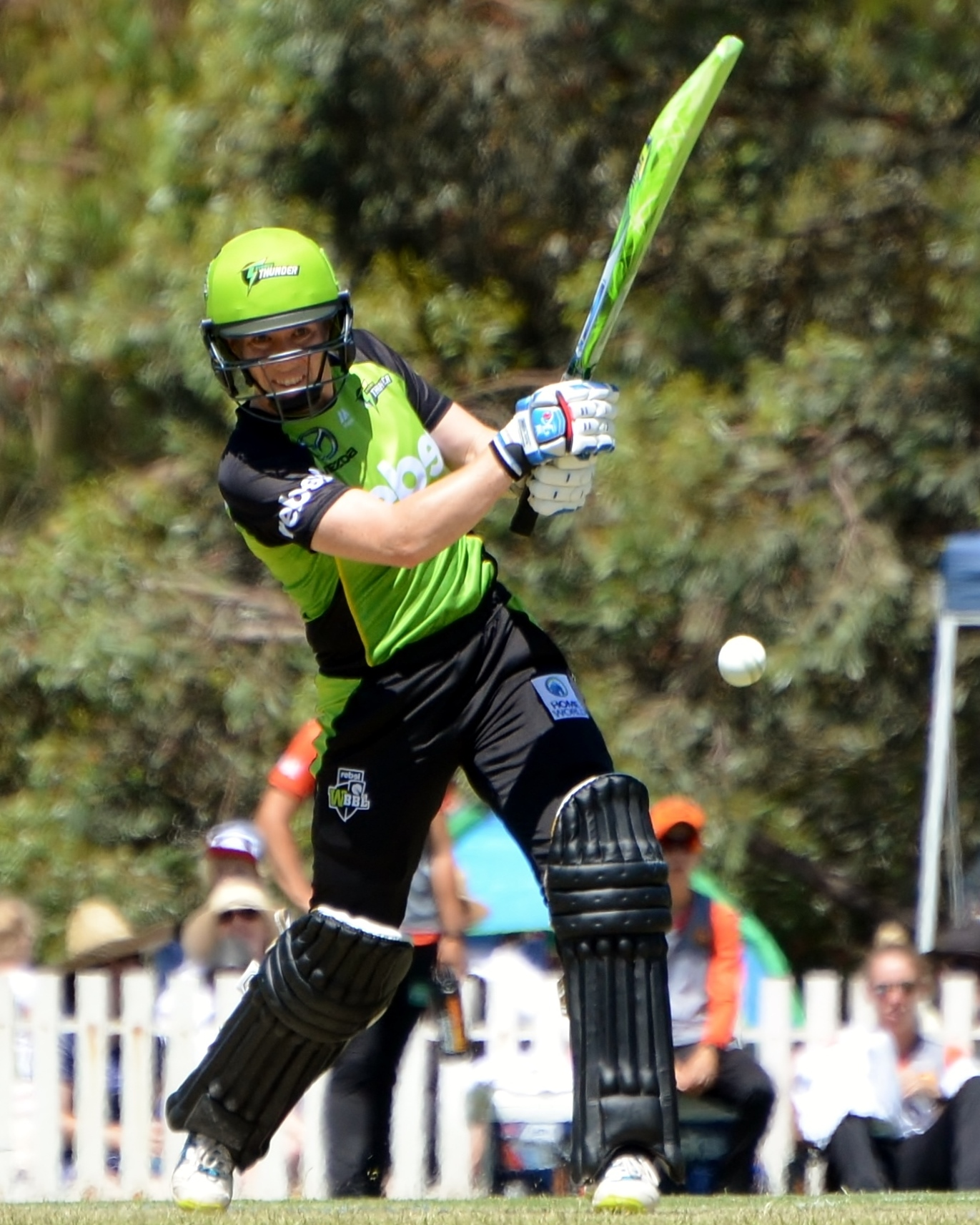
- Blackwell batting for Sydney Thunder, 2018

Personal information
- Full name: Alexandra Joy Blackwell
- Born: 31 August 1983 (age 43); Wagga Wagga, New South Wales, Australia
- Nickname: Seal
- Batting: Right-handed
- Bowling: Right-arm medium
- Role: All-rounder
- Relatives: Kate Blackwell (twin sister); Lynsey Askew (wife)

International information
- National side: Australia
- Test debut (cap 142): 15 February 2003 v England
- Last Test: 9 November 2017 v England
- ODI debut (cap 97): 29 January 2003 v England
- Last ODI: 29 October 2017 v England
- ODI shirt no.: 2
- T20I debut (cap 1): 2 September 2005 v England
- Last T20I: 22 February 2017 v New Zealand

Domestic team information
- Years: Team
- 2001/02–2017/18: New South Wales
- 2006/07: Otago
- 2008–2015: Berkshire
- 2015/16–2019/20: Sydney Thunder
- 2016: Yorkshire Diamonds

Career statistics
Competition	Test	ODI	T20I	LA
Matches	12	144	95	306
Runs scored	444	3,492	1,314	8,911
Batting average	22.20	36.00	21.19	40.13
100s/50s	0/4	3/25	0/1	15/57
Top score	74	114	61	157
Balls bowled	72	132	6	533
Wickets	0	6	0	10
Bowling average	–	10.50	–	37.20
5 wickets in innings	–	0	–	0
10 wickets in match	–	0	–	0
Best bowling	–	2/8	–	2/8
Catches/stumpings	6/–	55/–	33/–	124/–
- Source: CricketArchive, 6 August 2025

Alexandra Joy Blackwell (born 31 August 1983) is a former professional cricketer and Australian women's cricket captain who played for New South Wales and Australia as a specialist batter. After making her international debut in 2002–2003, she went on to play more matches for Australia than any other female cricketer in history. A highlight of Blackwell's career was captaining the 2010 Women's team to World Twenty20 victory.

In October 2017, she made her 250th international appearance for the Australian women's cricket team. In November 2019, she announced her retirement from cricket, after a career that spanned 18 years. Her identical twin sister Kate has also played for Australia.

After retiring from cricket, Blackwell returned to her previous career as a genetic counsellor. Her memoir, Fair Game, was published in 2022.

In 2013, Blackwell became the first female international cricketer to publicly come out as gay. She has been a passionate advocate for LGBTQIA+ rights and represented Cricket Australia in the 2015 Sydney Gay and Lesbian Mardi Gras. She has also been a vocal supporter of the inclusion of transgender cricketers at all levels.

== Early life ==
Blackwell was born in Wagga Wagga, but raised in Yenda, a small rural town outside of Griffith, New South Wales. She and her identical twin sister Kate attended Barker College on the North Shore of Sydney as boarders.

In March 2000, Blackwell was called into the New South Wales team for the under 17 interstate competition. In the first match, she took 3/7 and wasn't required to bat in a ten wicket victory over Victoria Blue. Her top-score for the tournament came in the sixth match against Western Australia, when she scored 57 not out. New South Wales won all of their eight matches to claim the competition and Blackwell ended with 149 runs at 37.25 and seven wickets at 17.00.

== International cricket ==
=== 2003-04: International debut ===
Blackwell made her international debut in 2003 in a quadrangular One Day International (ODI) tournament. She had few opportunities with the bat, scoring 54 runs at 27.00 but was unexpectedly successful with the ball, taking a total of 4/34 despite only having one previous wicket at senior level.

She then made her Test debut in a two-match series against England at the Gabba in Brisbane, hitting a half-century in the latter fixture. Following this, Blackwell was retained for the Second Test at Bankstown Oval in Sydney. Australia batted first and Blackwell came in at 4/90. Soon after, her partners Mel Jones and Hayes fell in quick succession as Australia lost 3/13 to be 6/103. Blackwell then added 21 with Cathryn Fitzpatrick before the former was out for 13; this triggered a collapse of 4/10 as Australia were all out for 134. Blackwell came in at 4/49 with Australia still four runs behind in the second innings. She added 136 in 226 minutes for the fifth wicket with Lisa Sthalekar before being dismissed for 58, having hit six boundaries from 236 balls. In pursuit of a target of 206, England reached 6/133 when time ran out. Blackwell did not bowl in the match.

Blackwell retained her position in the national team for the Rose Bowl series, which consisted of three matches each in New Zealand and then Australia. She played in only the third match in New Zealand and did not bat in the seven-wicket win, before being omitted for the first match at home. She was recalled for the second match and made 15 not out in a 40-run win, before her unbeaten 22 guided Australia to a four-wicket win in the final match at Bellerive Oval, as the hosts took out the series 5–1.

In December 2004 Blackwell participated in a seven-match bilateral ODI series against India. She played in the first, third, fourth, fifth and sixth matches of the series, ending with 34 runs at 8.50.

=== 2005: World Cup ===
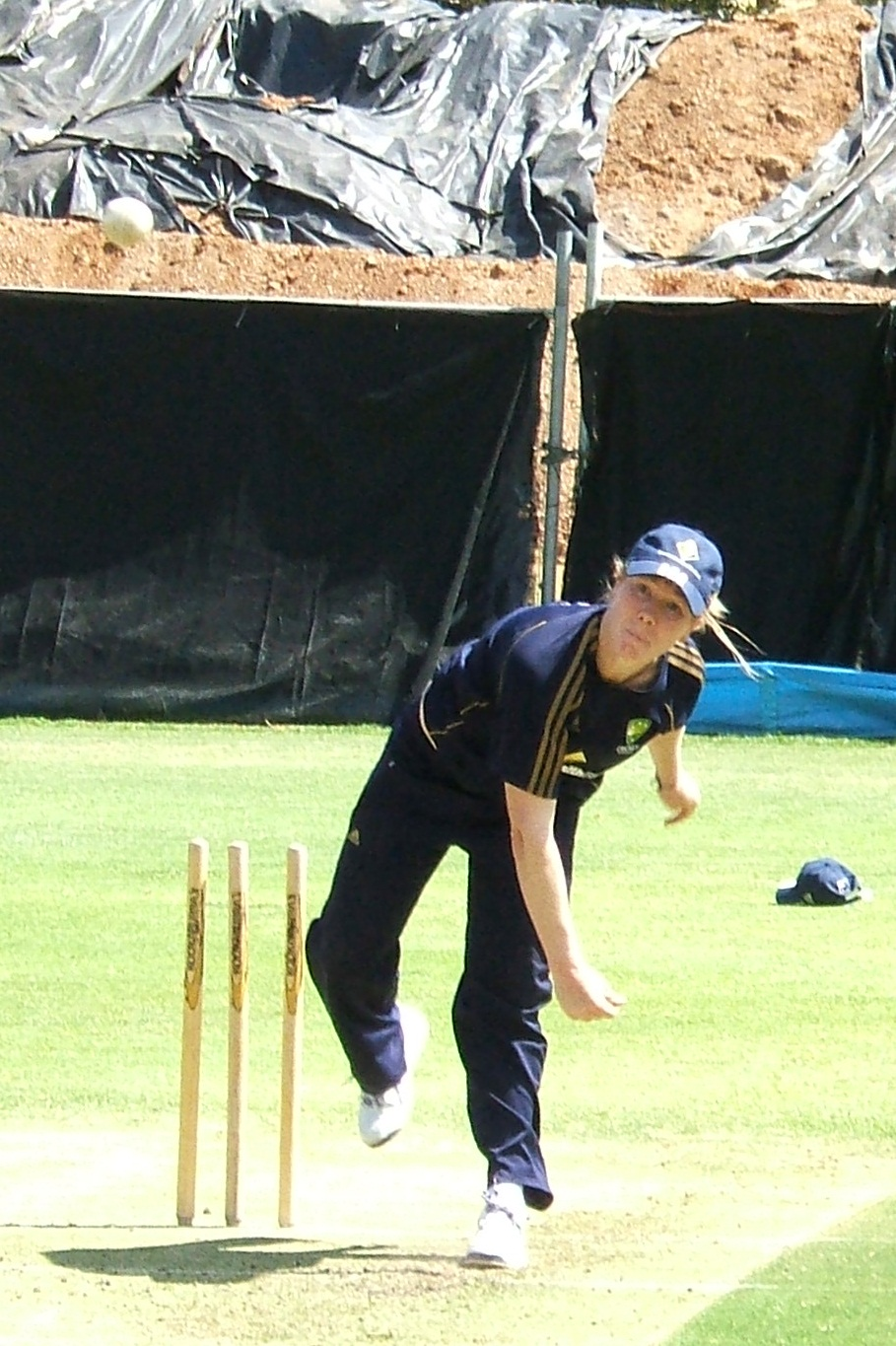
Blackwell bowling in the Adelaide Oval nets.

The Australians hosted New Zealand for three Rose Bowl ODIs in the western coastal city of Perth before the teams crossed the Indian Ocean to reach South Africa. Blackwell made six and took 1/8 in the first match, and was then run out for 27 in the next game. She was omitted for third match.

In the first match of the World Cup, Blackwell did not bat as England made 7/169 before rain ended the match. This was followed by an encounter with New Zealand. Blackwell scored 53 in Australia's 7/174, helping to set up a 32-run win. In the third match against the West Indies, she was run out for a duck in a 79-run win, and was dropped for the 97-run win over the hosts. The group stages ended with two easy victories. Blackwell took 1/8 from two overs, her last international wicket, as Australia dismissed Sri Lanka for 57. The final pool match against India was abandoned without a ball being bowled due to inclement weather, and Australia met England in the semi-finals. Blackwell scored 10 not out, helping to complete the closing stages of a five-wicket win. In the final against India, she came in towards the end of the innings and made four not out as Australia amassed 4/215. Australia bowled India out for 117 to win by 98 runs. Blackwell ended the tournament with 67 runs at 33.50.

In the northern hemisphere summer of 2005, Australia toured England. They started with a stopover in Ireland, and only the second of the three ODIs went ahead; the other two matches were washed out by persistent rain. Blackwell made four not out as Australia made 3/295 and took a 240-run win.

Australia played two Tests in England. In the First Test at County Ground in Hove, Sussex, Blackwell batted at No. 5 and played alongside identical twin sister Kate, who was making her Test debut. She struggled in both innings, making five and nine and scoring at a strike rate of 20 or less in both innings. After taking an 82-run lead, Australia set the hosts a target of 306. Blackwell took two catches, her first at Test level, removing Claire Taylor and Jenny Gunn as the hosts ended on 7/172 to salvage a draw. In the Second Test at New Road, Worcester, Blackwell made 20 and 14 as Australia ceded a 158-run first innings lead and eventually lost by six wickets after Blackwell's fall in the second innings left them at 5/46, still 112 runs in arrears. She ended the series with 48 runs at 12.00.

Blackwell scored 5, 27, 17 not out, 21 not out and 14 as Australia won 3–2. She ended the series with 84 runs at 28.00. Blackwell then played in Australia's inaugural Twenty20 international at the County Ground, Taunton, only the second international match in the history of the new format. She was not required to bat as Australia won with seven wickets in hand.

After a strong WNCL season, Blackwell was retained for the series against India in Adelaide at the end of the Australian summer. Opening the batting, she made a 17-ball duck in the one-off Test at the Adelaide Oval, which Australia won by an innings., where she ended the series with 83 runs at 41.50.

=== 2006-2007 ===
Blackwell missed the five-ODI Rose Bowl series at home due to injury. After recovering, she travelled across to New Zealand for three weekends of domestic one-dayers for Otago. In her debut for the team, she struck an even 100 in a 162-run win over Northern Districts. She added 79 in a 182-run victory the following day. After making 27 and 31 against Auckland, Blackwell ended her stay with 1 and 77 against Canterbury; Otago lost both matches. She ended with 315 runs at 52.50 in her six-match stint.

After the end of the Australian season, Blackwell was selected for the ODI team for a four-nations tournament in Chennai, India. In addition to the hosts and Australia, New Zealand and England were also participating, and each team played each other twice in round-robin phase. Blackwell ended the tournament with 54 runs at 13.50.

Blackwell was retained in the Rose Bowl series held in tropical Darwin in July 2007, the middle of the southern hemisphere winter. After watching the first two matches from the sidelines, she was called into the team for the third match where she made an unbeaten 44 to see Australia to a six-wicket win. She made 4 and 27 in the two remaining matches, ending the series with 75 runs at 37.50 as Australia prevailed 3–2.

Australia won the T20 international against England at the Melbourne Cricket Ground by 21 runs. After scoring 11 in an Australian defeat in the first ODI, Blackwell struck 101—her maiden ODI century—the next day at the MCG to set up an 84-run win. After making five as England took a 2–1 series lead, Blackwell made 61 in the final match to help set up a series-levelling 41-run win. She ended the series with 178 runs at 44.50. In the one-off Test at Bowral, Blackwell opened the innings. She made one as Australia batted first and reached 154 in their first innings before conceding a 90-run first innings lead. In the second innings, she made 24 before being bowled for the second time in the matches by pace bowler Isa Guha as the tourists won by six wickets in hand.

The Australians then headed to Bert Sutcliffe Oval in Lincoln, New Zealand, for a T20 international and five ODIs. Blackwell made 15 and took two catches as the hosts won the T20 by four wickets. She then made 44 of 5/189 to help secure a 63-run win in the first ODI. In the next two matches, she made seven twice, as the hosts claimed both matches to take the series lead. Australia thus needed to win the remaining two matches. In the fourth match, Blackwell made 61 in an Australian win by six runs. In the final match, she made 91 to help steer Australia to their target of 250 and a series-clinching eight-wicket win. Blackwell ended the series with 211 runs at 42.20. For the whole international season, she scored 389 runs at 43.22 to establish herself at international level.

=== 2008-2009: World Cup and World Twenty20 ===
During the 2008 Australian winter, Blackwell travelled to England for a domestic season in the northern hemisphere summer, playing for Berkshire in the county competition, and Rubies in the Super Fours. Blackwell failed to capitalise on her starts for the county, registering scores of 41, 22, 0, 39 and 30 in her five one-day innings for a total of 132 runs at 26.40. It was a similar story in four one-dayers for Rubies, making 58 runs at 14.50 with a best of 26. Blackwell had little impact in the T20s for Rubies, making four and a duck.

The 2008–09 Australian season started with a tour by India. Blackwell started with 0/14 from her only over and scored 14 in a six-wicket win in the T20 match. She was prominent as the hosts completed a 5–0 clean sweep of the ODIs. In the first match at Hurstville Oval, she made 75 in an eight-wicket win. After making eight and one not out in the next two matches, Blackwell made 106 not out, setting up a 118-run win in the fourth match at Manuka Oval. She ended the series with 65 run out in the seven-wicket win in the final match. Blackwell aggregated 255 runs at 85.00 for the series.

Blackwell made 10 and 9 in the first two matches of the Rose Bowl series as Australia went 2–0 down. She then made 59 and 37 in the next two matches as Australia levelled the series; the fifth and final match was washed out. The teams returned to Australia for the World Cup. In two warm-up matches against England and Sri Lanka, Blackwell made 91 not out and 56 retired; Australia won the matches by 25 and 230 runs respectively.

In the opening match of the World Cup campaign, Blackwell made four as Australia fell short of their target on the Duckworth-Lewis method. Australia then needed to win their two remaining group matches to reach the Super Six phase. Blackwell made 22 and took three catches as Australia defeated South Africa by 61 runs. She then scored 46 not out in a 47-run win over the West Indies. In the first Super Six match, against India, Blackwell scored 54 as Australia made 7/218, falling 17 runs of their target. She then made seven run out in the win over Pakistan by 107 runs. She made 38 not out in Australia's final Super Six match against England, and although the hosts won by eight wickets, it was not enough for them to place in the top two in the standings and qualify for the final. In the third-place playoff against India, Blackwell made 19 in a three-wicket defeat. Blackwell ended the tournament with 190 runs at 38.00.

Blackwell was selected for Australia's team for the inaugural Women's World Twenty20 held in England in 2009. The Australians hosted New Zealand for a three-match series in tropical Darwin at the beginning of June before the World Cup, and Blackwell played in all the matches, making 11 not out and 10 in her two innings. Australia took the series 2–1.

After arriving in England, Blackwell made 19 in Australia's 8/123, which New Zealand surpassed with nine wickets in hand. She was not required to bat in an eight-wicket win over the West Indies. Blackwell then 40 not out as Australia defeated South Africa by 24 runs.

This put Australia into the semi-final against England. Blackwell made five before England overhauled Australia's score of 5/163 to reach the final, which they won. She ended the tournament with 64 runs at 32.00.

Blackwell and the Australians stayed in England for a bilateral series against the hosts, who were the reigning world champions in both ODIs and T20s, after the end of the World Twenty20. In the one-off T20 match, she made 18 as Australia upset England by 34 runs. She played in all five ODIs, and had a torrid time against the English bowling, scoring 7, 3, 0, 0 and 5. She started with a 38-ball 7 in Chelmsford and had a series of slow-scoring single-digit innings, ending the series with a strike rate of 19.73.

England won all the ODI matches except the last, which was washed out. Blackwell played in the one-off Test match at County Road in Worcestershire. Blackwell opened and made a fourth-ball duck as Australia fell to 5/28 in their first innings before recovering to make 309. After the tourists had taken a 41-run lead, Blackwell made 68 as Australia made 231 to set the hosts a target of 273. Blackwell and opening partner Nitschke put on 49 before the latter was out for 25. Blackwell then added 81 in 21 overs with Rolton before the latter was dismissed, leaving the score at 2/130. She was then out at 3/150 after hitting six fours and a six from 135 balls, sparking a collapse of 8/81. The match was drawn as the hosts ended at 3/106.

=== 2010: National captaincy and World Twenty20 triumph ===
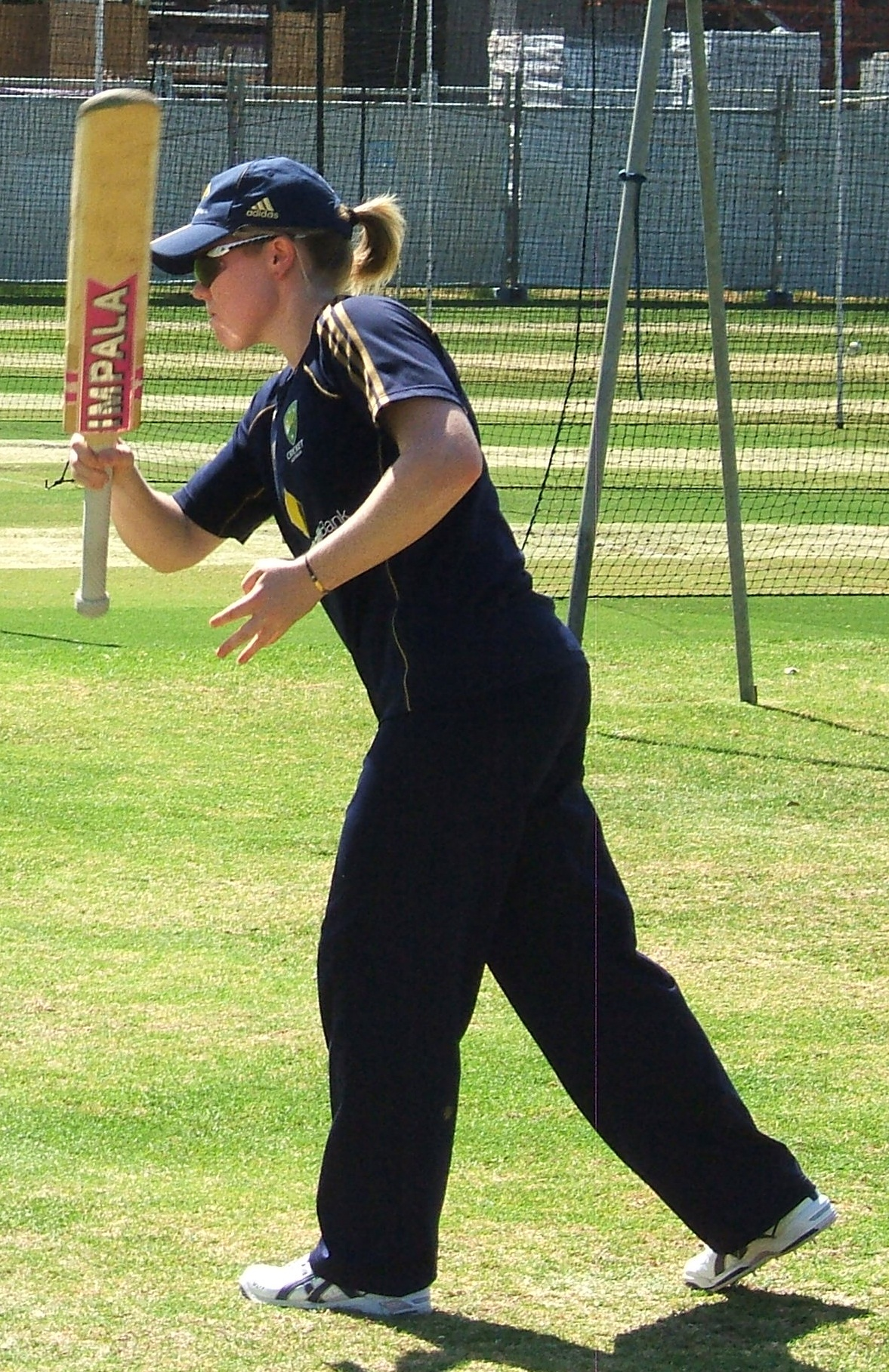
Blackwell hitting a ball for catching practice in the Adelaide Oval nets.

Blackwell led Australia in the Rose Bowl series against New Zealand in 2010 due to an injury to incumbent captain Jodie Fields. The campaign started with five ODIs in Australia. In the first two matches, held at the Adelaide Oval, she made 51 and 34 as the hosts won by 115 runs and six wickets respectively. The last three matches of the series were held at the Junction Oval in Melbourne. In the third ODI, Blackwell top-scored with 92 as Australia took a 102-run win and sealed the series. Blackwell ended her first series as captain with 178 runs at 44.50.

The ODIs were followed by three T20s at Bellerive Oval in Hobart and two more in New Zealand at the start of the second phase of the bilateral contests. Blackwell played in every match and Australia was whitewashed. The three matches in Hobart were closely fought; Blackwell made 11, top-scored with 40, and added 26 as New Zealand won by two, one and seven runs respectively. The hosts won the last two matches in New Zealand convincingly by 59 and 17 runs; Blackwell made 9 and 8 as the Australians were bowled out for 73 and 98. She ended the series with 94 runs at 18.80.

Australia then swept New Zealand 3–0 in the ODIs in New Zealand. In the first match, Blackwell made five as Australia came closest to defeat in the ODIs, scraping home by two wickets. She made 8 and 44 in last two matches in Invercargill to complete the clean sweep. In all the ODIs she made 235 runs at 33.57. Blackwell had thus led Australia to eight consecutive ODI wins over New Zealand.

Blackwell led the team at the 2010 World Twenty20 in the West Indies and captained in every match after Fields was again forced out by injury. She batted at No. 4 in all but one match. In the first warm-up match against New Zealand, she opened the bowling with her occasional medium pace, and took 1/29 from her four overs, dismissing the opposing captain and opener Aimee Watkins. She then came in at No. 4 and top-scored with 44 from as many balls as Australia lost by 18 runs. In the last warm-up match, she made 35 not out from 21 balls and featured in a 55-run partnership from 40 balls with Jess Cameron. She did not bowl herself as the Australians defeated Pakistan by 82 runs.

Australia were grouped with defending champions England, South Africa and the West Indies. In the first match against England, Blackwell ran out Holly Colvin to end the innings with 15 balls unused. In pursuit of 105 for victory, Australia were 2/10 when Blackwell came to the crease. She made 7 from 14 balls in a partnership of 34 from 33 balls—Australia's largest of the match—with Leah Poulton. However, their dismissals in consecutive overs started a collapse of 5/19 from 34 balls. However, Australia recovered, and Rene Farrell was run out going for the winning run from the third last ball available, leaving the scores tied.

A Super Over eventuated, and both teams ended with 2/6 after both suffered run outs in an attempt to secure a seventh run on the final ball. Australia was awarded the match because they had hit more sixes in the match—Jess Cameron scored the solitary six.

In the next match against South Africa, Blackwell made 9 from 14 balls, the only Australian in the first seven batting positions to score at less than a strike rate of 133.33. In the final group match, Blackwell top-scored with 28 from 26 balls, and batted through most of the innings, although she only faced a small minority of the 74 balls delivered during her time at the crease, as Australia finished on 7/133. Australia won by nine runs to finish the group stage unbeaten at the top of their quartet.

Australia went on to face India in the semi-final. Blackwell reached her fifty in 37 balls and was eventually out for 61 from 49 balls with 17 runs still required from 28 balls for victory. The Australians reached their target with seven wickets and seven balls to spare, and Blackwell was named the player of the match.

In the final against New Zealand, the Australians eventually reached 8/106 from their 20 overs. Australia went on to win by three runs.

=== 2015: Ashes ===
In June 2015, Blackwell was named as one of Australia's touring party for the 2015 Women's Ashes in England.

=== 2017–18 ===
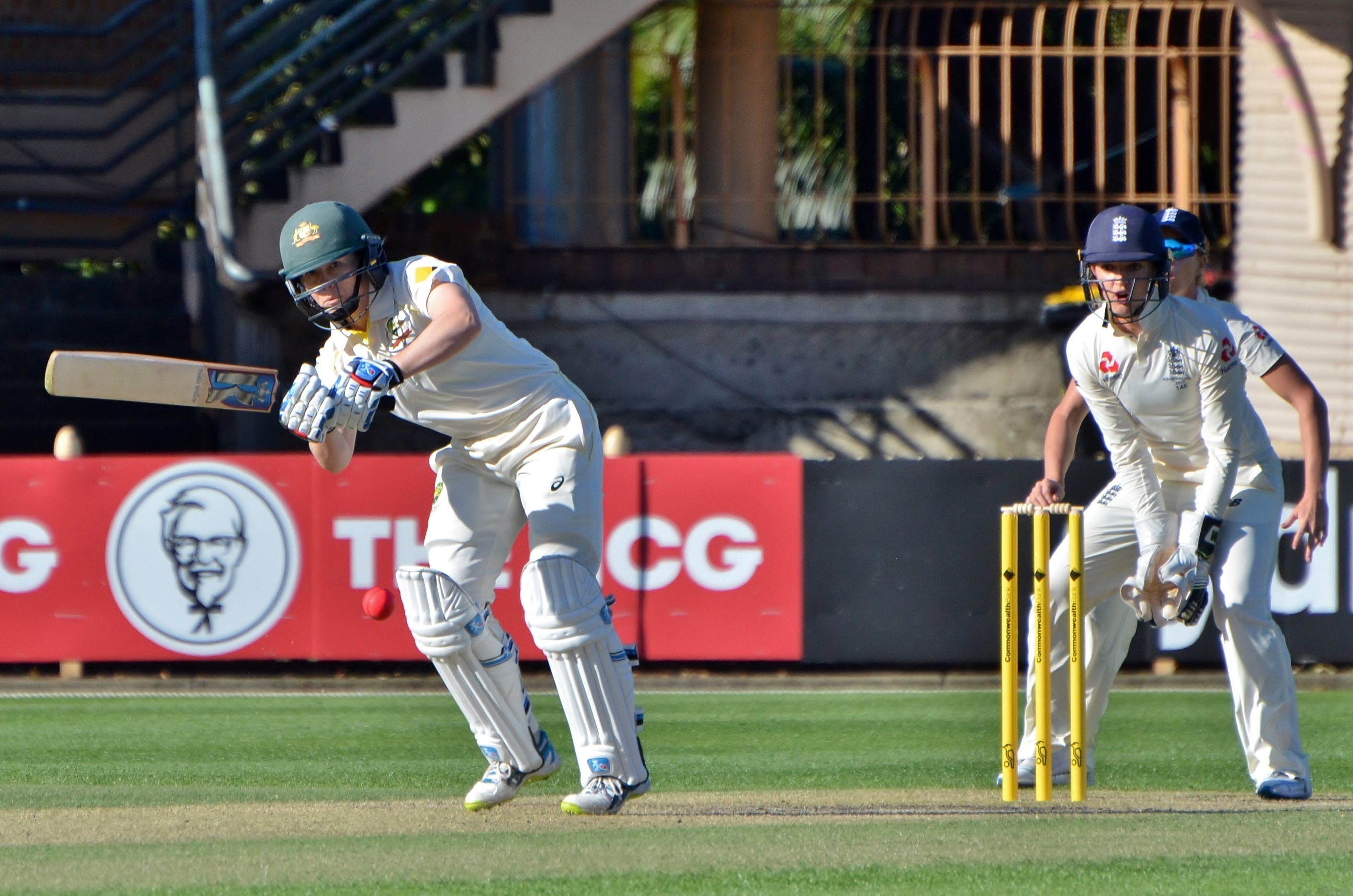
Blackwell playing her final innings for Australia during the 2017–18 Women's Ashes Test at North Sydney Oval. The wicket-keeper is Sarah Taylor.

Blackwell was in Australia's squad for the Women's Ashes. In the first WODI of the series she came to the crease when Australia were 4/87, still requiring 144 runs for victory. She batted for the rest of the innings, getting to a total of 67 and steering Australia to victory in the final over of the match. In the third WODI of the series, she played in her 250th international match for Australia Women.

=== Retirement ===
In February 2018, Blackwell announced her retirement from international and state career. She featured in 251 matches across all three formats in a career spanning for 15 years. She has written that she sees herself as having been a "good international cricketer", but not a "great" one. She also does not think that she can make a judgement as to whether she was a good leader; "... only my peers can." However, she also feels that she had been her "true self", had spoken up, with respect, to others in the cricketing community in seeking continual improvement, and had "... kept on trying to be the best leader [she] could."

== Domestic cricket ==
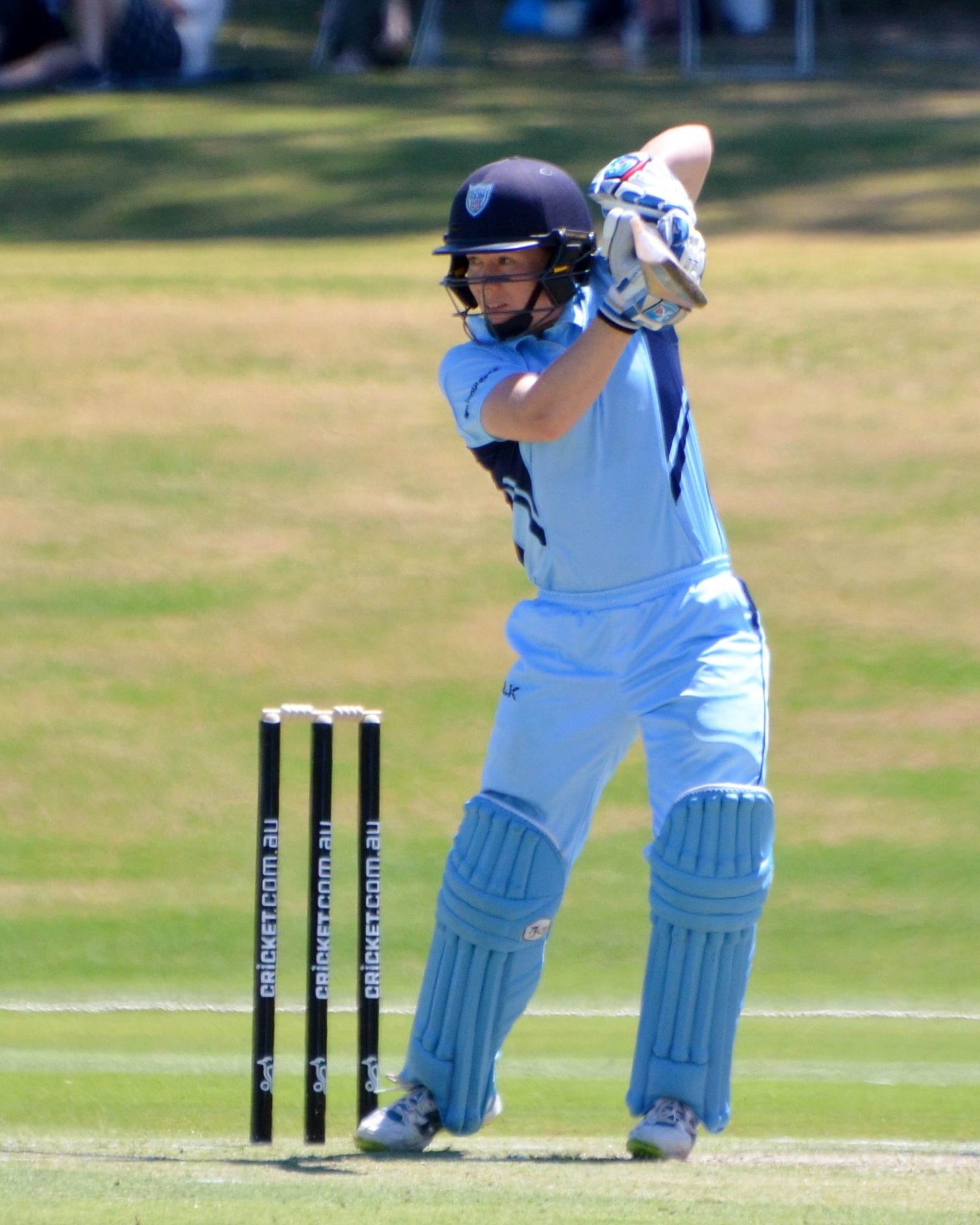
Blackwell batting for the NSW Breakers, 2017

During the 2001–02 season, Blackwell made her senior debut for New South Wales. In her first match against Queensland, she bowled two expensive overs, conceding 18 runs, and was not required to bat as New South Wales won by six wickets.

At the end of the season, Blackwell was selected for the Australia Youth team that played New Zealand A. She made 76 runs at 19.00 in four matches with a highest score of 32 and took a total of 1/43 from 11 overs. This was followed by a match against the senior New Zealand team. Blackwell took 1/18 and scored 2 in a 21-run defeat.

=== WNCL ===
Blackwell made her senior debut for New South Wales in the 2001–02 Women's National Cricket League (WNCL). She made 33 runs at 33.00 in her debut season as New South Wales won the WNCL.

Blackwell's highlights with the WNCL include:

- 2002-2003 was her first full season, taking to the field in all 10 of New South Wales' matches. She made her maiden half-century at senior level, scoring 74 not out to guide her state of a five-wicket win over Victoria. In the second final, she took her maiden wicket at senior level, but her sporadic bowling was otherwise unsuccessful, conceding 45 runs in 8 overs for the season. Blackwell ended the season with 212 runs at 30.28.
- Blackwell had a prolific 2005–06 WNCL season, scoring 411 runs including her maiden century.
- She missed first four WNCL matches of the 2006–07 season due to injury. She returned for the final four round-robin matches and made 42, 17, 74 and 4 as New South Wales won all four matches. Blackwell ended the season with 158 runs at 22.57.
- Blackwell started the 2007–08 WNCL season strongly, scoring half-centuries in each of the first four matches, all of which were won by New South Wales. Blackwell scored 291 runs at 41.57.
- She ended the 2008–2009 season with 372 runs at 62.00.
- After making single-figure scores in consecutive matches, Blackwell struck an unbeaten 121, scoring more than half the runs in an eight-wicket win over the Australian Capital Territory in the third match of the season. After making 37 and 39 in the pair of matches against Victoria, she was prominent in the double-header against Western Australia, scoring 138 to set up a 127-run win, before making an unbeaten 61 the next day in a ten-wicket win. In the final, Blackwell top-scored with 54 as New South Wales batted first and made 9/206. They then dismissed the Victorians for 147 to seal a 59-run win. Blackwell ended the WNCL with 489 runs at 61.12.

== One Day International centuries ==
In her 251 international matches, Blackwell scored three centuries, all of them in ODIs. During the first two of those centuries, both made in 2008, her twin sister Kate was "up the other end". Her third ODI hundred, and highest international score, came just over seven years later, in 2016. It was against India, the same opposing team as for her second ODI century, and at the same venue, Manuka Oval in Canberra, where, as she later wrote, she "... always batted well."

One-Day International centuries
No.	Runs	Opponents	Venue	Year
1	101	England	Melbourne Cricket Ground, Melbourne, Australia	2008
2	106*	India	Manuka Oval, Canberra, Australia	2008
3	114	India	Manuka Oval, Canberra, Australia	2016

== Personal life ==
Blackwell's nickname is "Seal". She has explained that the origin of the nickname is "... a story which involves the misquoting of lyrics from the Go Go's song 'Our Lips Are Sealed'."

In 2013, Blackwell came out as lesbian, the second international player to come out during their playing career after England's Steven Davies. Her wife is fellow cricketer Lynsey Askew.

Blackwell is a passionate advocate for LGBTQIA+ rights and represented Cricket Australia in the 2015 Sydney Gay and Lesbian Mardi Gras. She has also been a vocal supporter of the inclusion of transgender cricketers at all levels and was involved in developing Cricket Australia's trans and gender diverse inclusion policy in 2019.

Blackwell's memoir, Fair Game, was published in 2022. She is an in-demand public speaker talking about gender equality and LGBTI inclusion in sport, and her experiences as a professional athlete.

Blackwell was supported to complete her Bachelor of Medicine at the University of New South Wales in 2007 through the university's Elite Athlete Program. Following this, Blackwell also obtained a Graduate Diploma in Genetic Counseling from Charles Sturt University, and Graduate Certificate in Reproductive Medicine from UNSW. She currently works as an Associate Genetic Counsellor at Sydney Children's Hospital and The Royal Hospital for Women, Randwick.

== See also ==
- List of centuries in women's One Day International cricket
