= Beth Morgan (cricketer) =

English cricketer (born 1981)

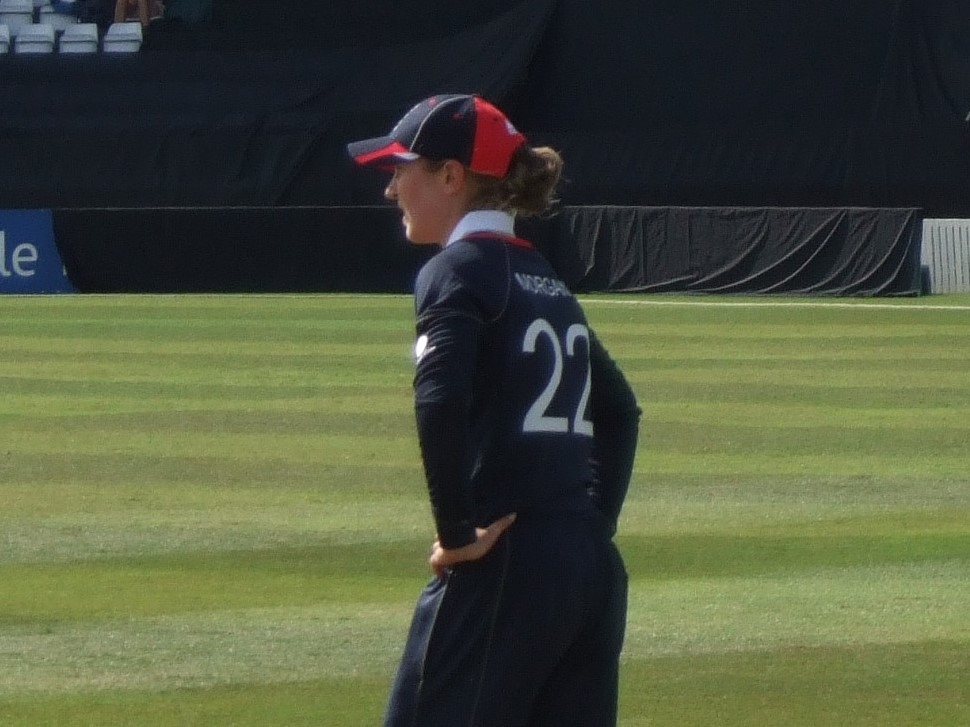
- Morgan in 2009

Personal information
- Full name: Beth Louisa Morgan
- Born: 27 September 1981 (age 45); Harrow, Greater London, England
- Batting: Right-handed
- Bowling: Right-arm medium
- Role: All-rounder
- Relatives: Eddie Hemmings (uncle)

International information
- National side: England (1999–2011)
- Test debut (cap 144): 9 August 2005 v Australia
- Last Test: 10 July 2009 v Australia
- ODI debut (cap 85): 19 July 1999 v Netherlands
- Last ODI: 7 January 2011 v Australia
- T20I debut (cap 14): 2 September 2005 v Australia
- Last T20I: 30 October 2011 v South Africa

Domestic team information
- Years: Team
- 1996–2019: Middlesex
- 2012/13–2013/14: South Australia
- 2016: Surrey Stars

Career statistics
Competition	WTest	WODI	WT20I	WLA
Matches	7	72	28	270
Runs scored	244	590	300	4,861
Batting average	24.40	13.40	15.00	25.45
100s/50s	0/1	0/1	0/0	1/28
Top score	58	77	46*	106
Balls bowled	1,025	1,360	82	7,780
Wickets	6	27	5	181
Bowling average	62.33	35.55	20.80	25.10
5 wickets in innings	0	0	0	0
10 wickets in match	0	0	0	0
Best bowling	1/17	3/19	2/8	4/13
Catches/stumpings	1/–	26/–	8/–	107/–
- Source: CricketArchive, 21 February 2021

Beth Louisa Morgan (born 27 September 1981) is an English former cricketer who played as a right-handed batter and right-arm medium bowler. She appeared in seven Test matches, 72 One Day Internationals and 28 Twenty20 Internationals for England between 1999 and 2011. She was a member of the team which retained the Ashes in Australia in 2008, and won the World Cup and World T20 in 2009. She played domestic cricket for Middlesex, Surrey Stars and South Australia.

== Early and personal life ==
Morgan was born on the 27 September 1981 in Harrow, Greater London. Her uncle is the former test cricketer Eddie Hemmings who played for England 16 times, who Morgan has said is great to have on the end of the phone for support. When at Nower Hill High School in Pinner, she played for the otherwise all male team, helping them win the Harrow cup against local rivals Hatch End.

== Domestic career ==
Morgan played for Middlesex from 1996 to 2019. She played 187 limited-overs and Twenty20 matches for the side, and was the only player to play in every season of the Women's County Championship. She also played one season for the Surrey Stars in the Kia Super League, and two seasons for South Australia.

== International career ==
Morgan played seven test matches, 72 one day internationals and 28 T20Is for England. She was a member of England's victorious team in the 2009 World Twenty20 competition, and scored a vital unbeaten 46 from 34 balls in the defeat of Australia in the semi-final. She made her maiden test fifty against Australia in the one-off Ashes test the same year, scoring 58 in almost six hours at the crease. Due to a shoulder injury, she retired from international cricket on 15 January 2013.
