= Kate Blackwell (cricketer) =

Australian cricketer

Personal information
- Full name: Katherine Anne Blackwell
- Born: 31 August 1983 (age 43); Wagga Wagga, New South Wales, Australia
- Batting: Right-handed
- Bowling: Right-arm medium pace
- Relatives: Alex Blackwell (twin sister)

International information
- National side: Australia
- Test debut (cap 145): 9 August 2005 v England
- Last Test: 15 February 2008 v England
- ODI debut (cap 102): 13 December 2004 v India
- Last ODI: 9 November 2008 v India
- T20I debut (cap 2): 2 September 2005 v England
- Last T20I: 28 October 2008 v India

Domestic team information
- Years: Team
- 2002/03–2010: New South Wales Breakers
- 2005/06: Wellington Blaze
- 2010: Middlesex Women cricket team

Career statistics
Competition	WTest	WODI	WT20I
Matches	4	41	6
Runs scored	180	475	119
Batting average	25.71	19.00	39.66
100s/50s	0/1	0/1	0/0
Top score	72	57*	43*
Balls bowled	–	18	18
Wickets	–	0	0
Bowling average	–	–	–
5 wickets in innings	–	–	–
10 wickets in match	–	–	–
Best bowling	–	–	–
Catches/stumpings	7/–	12/–	2/–
- Source: Cricinfo, 16 April 2021

Katherine Anne Blackwell (born 31 August 1983) is a former Australian cricketer. Blackwell was born in Wagga Wagga, but raised in Yenda, a small rural town outside of Griffith, New South Wales. She and her identical twin sister Alex Blackwell were part of the Australian national team that won the 2005 Women's Cricket World Cup in South Africa. In the 2005–06 season she played for the Wellington Blaze in the State League.

Kate Blackwell played four Tests and 41 One Day International matches for Australia. She is the 145th woman to play Test cricket for Australia, and the 102nd woman to play One Day International cricket for Australia.

As of June 2014 she has played 136 domestic limited-overs matches including 82 Women's National Cricket League games for the New South Wales Breakers.

Blackwell along with Karen Rolton holds the record for the highest 4th wicket runstand in WT20I history (sharing 147*)

When asked about the frequent comparisons in the Australian media of the Blackwell twins to male cricketers, she said, "We look up to them a lot, but female cricketers should be recognised for themselves, not as the equivalent of Mark Waugh or Steve Waugh or Matthew Hayden or anybody."
