= Leonie Coleman =

Australian cricketer

Personal information
- Full name: Leonie Anne Coleman
- Born: 5 February 1979 (age 47); Tamworth, New South Wales
- Batting: Right-handed
- Role: Wicket-keeper

International information
- National side: Australia
- Only Test (cap 151): 15 February 2008 v England
- ODI debut (cap 99): 11 February 2004 v New Zealand
- Last ODI: 16 March 2009 v Pakistan
- T20I debut (cap 20): 1 February 2008 v England
- Last T20I: 6 March 2008 v New Zealand

Domestic team information
- Years: Team
- 1995/96–2008/09: New South Wales
- 2009/10–2010/11: ACT Meteors

Career statistics
Competition	Test	ODI	T20I	LA
Matches	1	24	2	156
Runs scored	21	119	9	985
Batting average	10.50	14.87	9.00	17.58
100s/50s	0/0	0/0	0/0	1/2
Top score	13	44	9	119
Catches/stumpings	3/0	15/8	1/1	90/50
- Source: CricInfo, 7 August 2025

Leonie Anne Coleman (born 5 February 1979) is a retired Australian cricketer. A wicket-keeper, Coleman played in one Test match and 24 One Day Internationals for the Australian national women's cricket team. Coleman is the 151st woman to play Test cricket for Australia.

After making her international debut against New Zealand in 2004, she suffered an injury which kept her out of the international side for several years. She earned a recall to the national side just before the 2007–08 Ashes series, when first choice wicket-keeper Jodie Fields (then Jodie Purves) broke her thumb in a club match. However, Coleman retired from international cricket following the 2009 Women's Cricket World Cup, after Fields was preferred as wicket-keeper throughout the tournament. Coleman is the 99th woman to play One Day International cricket for Australia.

Coleman played domestic cricket for the New South Wales Breakers from 1996 to 2009, then played for the ACT Meteors from 2009 to 2011.
