= New Zealand women's cricket team in Australia in 2009 =

	Australia	New Zealand
- Dates: 1 – 3 June 2009
Captains	Karen Rolton	Aimee Watkins

Twenty20 International series
- Results: Australia won the 3-match series 2–1
Most runs	Leah Poulton (67)	Suzie Bates (65)
Most wickets	Lisa Sthalekar (8)	Aimee Watkins (4)
- Player of the series: Lisa Sthalekar (Aus)

The New Zealand women's national cricket team toured Australia in June 2009. They played against Australia in three Twenty20 Internationals, with Australia winning the series 2–1. The series preceded both teams' participation in the 2009 ICC Women's World Twenty20.

== Squads ==
Australia	New Zealand
Karen Rolton (c); Sarah Andrews; Alex Blackwell; Jess Duffin; Lauren Ebsary; Rene Farrell; Jodie Fields (wk); Shelley Nitschke; Erin Osborne; Ellyse Perry; Kirsten Pike; Leah Poulton; Lisa Sthalekar; Elyse Villani	Aimee Watkins (c); Suzie Bates; Nicola Browne; Saskia Bullen; Sophie Devine; Lucy Doolan; Victoria Lind; Katey Martin (wk); Sara McGlashan; Rachel Priest (wk); Kate Pulford; Amy Satterthwaite; Sian Ruck; Sarah Tsukigawa

== WT20I Series ==
=== 1st T20I ===
1 June 2009
Scorecard

New Zealand; 115 (19 overs)	v	Australia; 111/6 (20 overs)
Suzie Bates 38 (28); Lisa Sthalekar 3/12 (4 overs)		Karen Rolton 36 (31); Sian Ruck 2/13 (4 overs)

New Zealand Women won by 4 runs
Allan Border Field, Brisbane
Umpires: Damien Mealey (Aus) and Norm McNamara (Aus)

- New Zealand Women won the toss and elected to bat.
- Rene Farrell (Aus), Victoria Lind and Sian Ruck (NZ) all made their WT20I debuts.

=== 2nd T20I ===
2 June 2009
Scorecard

New Zealand; 80/7 (20 overs)	v	Australia; 74/2 (13 overs)
Sarah Tsukigawa 16 (26); Lisa Sthalekar 3/11 (4 overs)		Leah Poulton 33 (31); Aimee Watkins 1/10 (2 overs)

Australia Women won by 8 wickets (D/L)
Allan Border Field, Brisbane
Umpires: Andrew Curran (Aus) and Damien Mealey (Aus)

- New Zealand Women won the toss and elected to bat.
- Rain stopped play after 4.4 overs of Australia Women's innings; revised target was 74 runs off 18 overs.
- Saskia Bullen (NZ) made her WT20I debut.

=== 3rd T20I ===
3 June 2009
Scorecard

Australia; 124/6 (20 overs)	v	New Zealand; 92 (18 overs)
Lisa Sthalekar 34 (29); Aimee Watkins 2/26 (4 overs)		Suzie Bates 16 (17); Sarah Andrews 3/16 (3 overs)

Australia Women won by 32 runs
Allan Border Field, Brisbane
Umpires: Darren Maloney (Aus) and Jay Kangur (Aus)

- New Zealand Women won the toss and elected to field.
- Elyse Villani (Aus) made her WT20I debut.
