= 2017–18 Women's National Cricket League season =

Cricket tournament

Women's National Cricket League 2017–18 season
- Dates: 6 October 2017 – 24 February 2018
- Administrator: Cricket Australia
- Cricket format: Limited overs cricket (50 overs)
- Tournament format(s): Round-robin and final
- Champions: New South Wales (19th title)
- Runners-up: Western Australia
- Participants: 7
- Matches: 22
- Player of the series: (New South Wales) Rachael Haynes
- Most runs: (New South Wales) Ellyse Perry (372)
- Most wickets: (New South Wales) Rene Farrell (16)
- Official website: cricket.com.au

The 2017–18 Women's National Cricket League season was the 22nd season of the Women's National Cricket League, the women's domestic limited overs cricket competition in Australia. The tournament started on 6 October 2017 and finished on 24 February 2018. Defending champions New South Wales Breakers won the tournament for the 19th time after topping the ladder and beating Western Fury in the final.

== Ladder ==
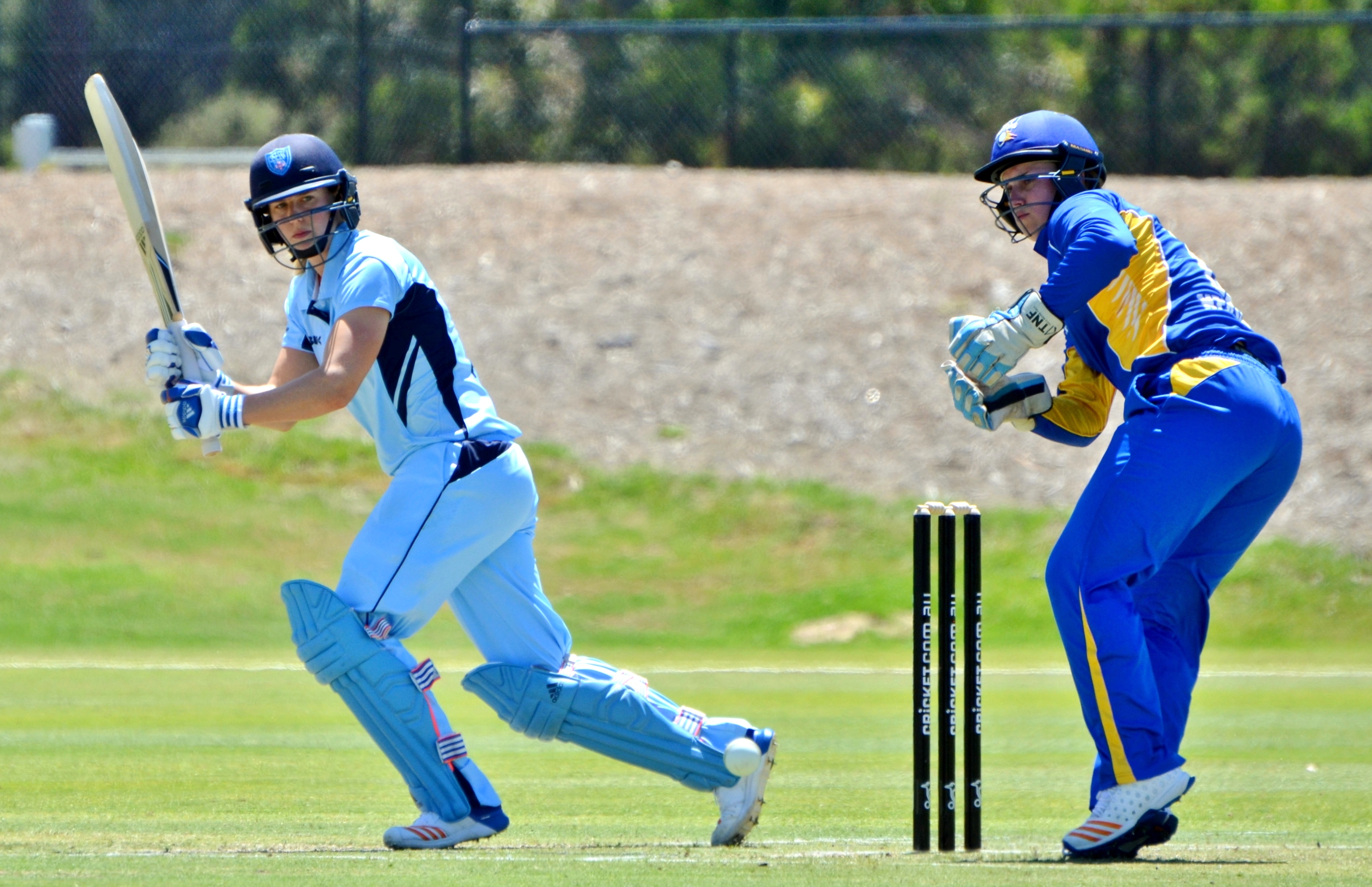
Ellyse Perry scored 127* for the NSW Breakers in a top-of-the-table clash against the ACT Meteors at Murdoch University Ground, Perth, on 26 November 2017. The wicket-keeper is Erica Kershaw.

As of 18 February 2018

Pos	Team	Pld	W	L	T	NR	BP	Pts	NRR
1	New South Wales	6	6	0	0	0	6	30	1.864
2	Western Australia	6	5	1	0	0	2	22	0.622
3	South Australia	6	3	3	0	0	3	15	0.021
4	Australian Capital Territory	6	3	3	0	0	2	14	0.053
5	Queensland	6	2	4	0	0	3	11	0.080
6	Victoria	6	2	4	0	0	0	8	−0.867
7	Tasmania	6	0	6	0	0	0	0	−1.753

Updated to match(es) played on 18 February 2018. Source:
Rules for classification: The top two ranked teams qualified for the final.
- Points system: 4 for a win, 2 each for a tie or a no result, 0 for a loss, 1 each for an abandoned match.
- Bonus point system: 2 for win with a run rate twice that of the opposition, 1 for win with a run rate 1.25 times that of the opposition.

== Fixtures ==
=== Round 1 ===
Match 1
6 October 2017
10:00
Scorecard

Queensland; 225 (49.4 overs)	v	New South Wales (home team); 4/226 (38.1 overs)
Beth Mooney 73 (88); Ellyse Perry 3/37 (9 overs)		Rachael Haynes 103* (93); Sammy-Jo Johnson 1/20 (4 overs)

New South Wales won by 6 wickets (with 71 balls remaining)
Blacktown International Sportspark No 2 Oval, Sydney
Umpires: Marc Nickl and Glen Stubbings
Player of the match: Rachael Haynes (New South Wales)

- New South Wales won the toss and elected to field.
- Points: New South Wales 5, Queensland 0.

Match 2
6 October 2017
10:00
Scorecard

Western Australia; 4/323 (50 overs)	v	South Australia (home team); 302 (48.4 overs)
Elyse Villani 139 (103); Samantha Betts 2/66 (10 overs)		Amanda-Jade Wellington 116 (125); Piepa Cleary 4/57 (9 overs)

Western Australia won by 21 runs
Adelaide Oval No. 2, Adelaide
Umpires: Trent Steenholdt and Craig Thomas
Player of the match: Elyse Villani (Western Australia)

- Western Australia won the toss and elected to bat.
- Points: Western Australia 4, South Australia 0.

Match 3
6 October 2017
14:30 (D/N)
Scorecard

(home team) Australian Capital Territory; 203 (50 overs)	v	Victoria; 7/173 (50 overs)
Dane van Niekerk 63 (74); Alana King 3/22 (5 overs)		Sophie Molineux 50 (54); Dane van Niekerk 3/31 (10 overs)

ACT won by 30 runs
Manuka Oval, Canberra
Umpires: Andrew Scotford and Deanne Young
Player of the match: Dane van Niekerk (ACT)

- Victoria won the toss and elected to field.
- Points: ACT 4, Victoria 0.

Match 4
7 October 2017
10:00
Scorecard

Tasmania; 222 (49.3 overs)	v	Western Australia; 3/225 (38.5 overs)
Georgia Redmayne 89 (124); Heather Graham 4/52 (10 overs)		Nicole Bolton 93* (104); Courtney Webb 2/28 (5.5 overs)

Western Australia won by 7 wickets (with 67 balls remaining)
Adelaide Oval No. 2, Adelaide
Umpires: Craig Thomas and Luke Uthenwoldt
Player of the match: Nicole Bolton (Western Australia)

- Tasmania won the toss and elected to bat.
- Points: Western Australia 5, Tasmania 0.

Match 5
8 October 2017
10:00
Scorecard

(home team) New South Wales; 9/302 (50 overs)	v	Victoria; 7/212 (50 overs)
Rachael Haynes 83 (79); Kristen Beams 5/52 (10 overs)		Emma Inglis 63 (82); Nicola Carey 3/26 (10 overs)

New South Wales won by 90 runs
Blacktown International Sportspark No 2 Oval, Sydney
Umpires: Anthony Hobson and Ryan Nelson
Player of the match: Rachael Haynes (New South Wales)

- Victoria won the toss and elected to field.
- Points: New South Wales 5, Victoria 0.

Match 6
8 October 2017
10:00
Scorecard

(home team) Australian Capital Territory; 6/285 (50 overs)	v	Queensland; 219 (45.3 overs)
Katie Mack 113* (125); Jess Jonassen 2/40 (10 overs)		Delissa Kimmince 61 (63); Hayley Jensen 5/33 (8.3 overs)

ACT won by 66 runs
Manuka Oval, Canberra
Umpires: Andrew Scotford and Deanne Young
Player of the match: Katie Mack (ACT)

- ACT won the toss and elected to bat.
- Points: ACT 5, Queensland 0.

Match 7
8 October 2017
10:00
Scorecard

Tasmania; 216 (49.4 overs)	v	South Australia (home team); 4/217 (35.4 overs)
Erin Fazackerley 41 (35); Samantha Betts 3/21 (5.4 overs)		Sophie Devine 117 (85); Brooke Hepburn 1/25 (4 overs)

South Australia won by 6 wickets (with 86 balls remaining)
Adelaide Oval No. 2, Adelaide
Umpires: Craig Thomas and Luke Uthenwoldt
Player of the match: Sophie Devine (South Australia)

- Tasmania won the toss and elected to bat.
- Points: South Australia 5, Tasmania 0.

=== Round 2 ===
Match 8
25 November 2017
10:00
Scorecard

Tasmania; 9/186 (50 overs)	v	Victoria (home team); 6/187 (46 overs)
Laura Wright 104* (142); Sophie Molineux 4/27 (10 overs)		Makinley Blows 91* (136); Brooke Hepburn 3/32 (9 overs)

Victoria won by 4 wickets (with 24 balls remaining)
Melbourne Cricket Ground, Melbourne
Umpires: Dale Ireland and David Shepard
Player of the match: Makinley Blows (Victorian Spirit)

- Victoria won the toss and elected to field.
- Points: Victoria 4, Tasmania 0.

Match 9
25 November 2017
10:00
Scorecard

Queensland; 163 (45.1 overs)	v	South Australia; 104 (29.5 overs)
Sammy-Jo Johnson 42 (78); Tabatha Saville 2/8 (2.1 overs)		Tabatha Saville 38* (45); Jemma Barsby 4/7 (4.5 overs)

Queensland won by 59 runs
Jubilee Park, Melbourne
Umpires: Daryl Brigham and Stephen Brne
Player of the match: Sammy-Jo Johnson (Queensland)

- Queensland won the toss and elected to bat.
- Points: Queensland 5, South Australia 0.

Match 10
25 November 2017
10:00
Scorecard

(home team) Western Australia; 239 (50 overs)	v	New South Wales; 3/241 (39.2 overs)
Amy Jones 67 (70); Lauren Smith 3/52 (10 overs)		Alyssa Healy 99 (89); Piepa Cleary 1/34 (6 overs)

New South Wales won by 7 wickets (with 64 balls remaining)
Murdoch University Ground, Perth
Umpires: Jack Paterson and Trent Steenholdt
Player of the match: Alyssa Healy (New South Wales)

- New South Wales won the toss and elected to field.
- Points: New South Wales 5, Western Australia 0.

Match 11
26 November 2017
10:00
Scorecard

New South Wales; 7/246 (50 overs)	v	Australian Capital Territory; 149 (42.5 overs)
Ellyse Perry 127* (120); Marizanne Kapp 4/24 (10 overs)		Erica Kershaw 36* (80); Rene Farrell 4/35 (10 overs)

New South Wales won by 97 runs
Murdoch University Ground, Perth
Umpires: James Hewitt and Jack Paterson
Player of the match: Ellyse Perry (New South Wales)

- New South Wales won the toss and elected to bat.
- Points: New South Wales 5, ACT 0.

Match 12
27 November 2017
10:00
Scorecard

Tasmania; 137 (47.3 overs)	v	Queensland; 2/140 (23.2 overs)
Laura Wright 24 (44); Delissa Kimmince 3/17 (5 overs)		Kirby Short 54 (58); Isobel Joyce 2/19 (4.2 overs)

Queensland won by 8 wickets (with 160 balls remaining)
Jubilee Park, Melbourne
Umpires: Stephen Brne and David Shepard
Player of the match: Delissa Kimmince (Queensland)

- Tasmania won the toss and elected to bat.
- Points: Queensland 6, Tasmania 0.

Match 13
27 November 2017
10:00
Scorecard

(home team) Victoria; 83 (36.1 overs)	v	South Australia; 7/84 (32.2 overs)
Kristen Beams 14 (54); Megan Schutt 3/16 (8 overs)		Tahlia McGrath 20 (65); Alana King 4/33 (10 overs)

South Australia won by 3 wickets (with 106 balls remaining)
Melbourne Cricket Ground, Melbourne
Umpires: Daryl Brigham and Dale Ireland
Player of the match: Alana King (Victoria)

- Victoria won the toss and elected to bat.
- Points: South Australia 5, Victoria 0.

Match 14
27 November 2017
10:00
Scorecard

(home team) Western Australia; 237 (50 overs)	v	Australian Capital Territory; 214 (47.5 overs)
Mathilda Carmichael 96 (139); Samantha Bates 2/25 (9 overs)		Erin Osborne 52 (83); Kathryn Cross 3/22 (9 overs)

Western Australia won by 23 runs
Murdoch University Ground, Perth
Umpires: James Hewitt and John Taylor
Player of the match: Mathilda Carmichael (Western Australia)

- Western Australia won the toss and elected to bat.
- Points: Western Australia 4, ACT 0.

=== Round 3 ===
Match 15
16 February 2018
10:00
Scorecard

(home team) Tasmania; 175 (49.3 overs)	v	New South Wales; 3/179 (27 overs)
Stefanie Daffara 63 (91); Rene Farrell 3/24 (10 overs)		Rachael Haynes 92* (71); Isobel Joyce 1/22 (2 overs)

New South Wales won by 7 wickets (with 138 balls remaining)
Lindisfarne Oval, Hobart
Umpires: Darren Close and Wade Stewart
Player of the match: Rachael Haynes (New South Wales)

- New South Wales won the toss and elected to field.
- Points: New South Wales 5, Tasmania 0.

Match 16
16 February 2018
10:00
Scorecard

Australian Capital Territory; 5/268 (50 overs)	v	South Australia; 5/269 (40 overs)
Claire Koski 132* (153); Ashleigh Gardner 1/36 (10 overs)		Sophie Devine 88 (53); Nicola Hancock 1/30 (4 overs)

South Australia won by 5 wickets (with 60 balls remaining)
Kingston Twin Ovals, Hobart
Umpires: G Beechey and Muhammad Qureshi
Player of the match: Claire Koski (ACT)

- South Australia won the toss and elected to field.
- Points: South Australia 5, ACT 0.

Match 17
16 February 2018
10:00
Scorecard

(home team) Queensland; 183 (47.2 overs)	v	Victoria; 8/184 (49.5 overs)
Grace Harris 56 (41); Kristen Beams 5/13 (10 overs)		Kristen Beams 58 (48); Delissa Kimmince 2/26 (10 overs)

Victoria won by 2 wickets (with 1 ball remaining)
Allan Border Field, Brisbane
Umpires: Murray Branch and Stephen Dionysius
Player of the match: Kristen Beams (Victoria)

- Victoria won the toss and elected to field.
- Points: Victoria 4, Queensland 0.

Match 18
17 February 2018
10:00
Scorecard

Victoria; 109 (39.5 overs)	v	Western Australia; 2/112 (30.3 overs)
Makinley Blows 26 (46); Emma King 4/17 (10 overs)		Heather Graham 43* (66); Tayla Vlaeminck 1/9 (3 overs)

Western Australia won by 8 wickets (with 117 balls remaining)
Allan Border Field, Brisbane
Umpires: Stephen Dionysius and D Rosolen
Player of the match: Heather Graham (Western Fury)

- Western Australia won the toss and elected to field.
- Points: Western Australia 5, Victoria 0.

Match 19
18 February 2018
10:00
Scorecard

Australian Capital Territory; 246 (49.4 overs)	v	Tasmania (home team); 160 (41.4overs)
Erin Burns 57 (57); Isobel Joyce 5/24 (4.4 overs)		Corinne Hall 60* (80); Erin Burns 2/16 (5 overs)

ACT won by 86 runs
Kingston Twin Ovals, Hobart
Umpires: Darren Close and Harvey Wolff
Player of the match: Isobel Joyce (Tasmania)

- Tasmania won the toss and elected to field.
- Points: ACT 5, Tasmania 0.

Match 20
18 February 2018
10:00
Scorecard

New South Wales; 9/279 (50 overs)	v	South Australia; 169 (37.5 overs)
Rachael Haynes 76 (67); Megan Schutt 2/25 (10 overs)		Sophie Devine 73 (52); Nicola Carey 2/22 (6 overs)

New South Wales won by 103 runs
Lindisfarne Oval, Hobart
Umpires: Muhammad Qureshi and Wade Stewart
Player of the match: Alex Blackwell (New South Wales)

- New South Wales won the toss and elected to field.
- Points: New South Wales 5, South Australia 0.

Match 21
18 February 2018
10:00
Scorecard

Western Australia; 222 (48.3 overs)	v	Queensland (home team); 191 (46.3 overs)
Elyse Villani 91 (108); Grace Harris 3/31 (9 overs)		Kirby Short 40 (55); Heather Graham 4/31 (8.3 overs)

Western Australia won by 31 runs
Allan Border Field, Brisbane
Umpires: Murray Branch and Stephen Dionysius
Player of the match: Elyse Villani (Western Australia)

- Queensland won the toss and elected to field.
- Points: Western Australia 4, Queensland 0.

== Final ==
24 February 2018
10:00
Scorecard

(home team) New South Wales; 6/302 (50 overs)	v	Western Australia; 251 (47.2 overs)
Alyssa Healy 122 (109); Kate Cross 2/35 (10 overs)		Elyse Villani 74 (67); Rene Farrell 2/31 (9 overs)

New South Wales won by 51 runs
Blacktown International Sportspark No 2 Oval, Sydney
Umpires: Darren Close and Nathan Johnstone
Player of the match: Alyssa Healy (New South Wales)

- Western Australia won the toss and elected to field.
- New South Wales won the 2017–18 Women's National Cricket League.

== Statistics ==
=== Highest totals ===
Team	Score	Against	Venue	Date
Western Australia	4/323	South Australia	Adelaide Oval No. 2	6 October 2017
South Australia	302	Western Australia	Adelaide Oval No. 2	6 October 2017
New South Wales	9/302	Victoria	Blacktown International Sportspark No 2 Oval	8 October 2017
New South Wales	6/302	Western Australia	Blacktown International Sportspark No 2 Oval	24 February 2018
Australian Capital Territory	6/285	Queensland	Manuka Oval	8 October 2017

=== Most runs ===
Player	Team	Mat	Inns	NO	Runs	HS	Ave	BF	SR	100	50
Ellyse Perry	New South Wales	7	7	2	372	127*	74.40	385	96.62	1	1
Rachael Haynes	New South Wales	7	6	2	363	103*	90.75	322	112.73	1	3
Elyse Villani	Western Australia	7	7	0	362	139	51.71	359	100.83	1	2
Sophie Devine	South Australia	6	6	0	342	117	57.00	249	137.34	1	2
Alyssa Healy	New South Wales	7	7	0	342	122	48.85	345	99.13	1	2

=== Most wickets ===
Player	Team	Mat	Inns	Overs	Mdns	Runs	Wkts	BBI	Ave	SR	4WI
Rene Farrell	New South Wales	7	7	64.4	9	236	16	4/35	14.75	24.2	1
Heather Graham	Western Australia	7	7	62.1	1	296	14	4/31	21.14	26.6	2
Kate Cross	Western Australia	7	7	63.2	14	246	13	3/22	18.92	29.2	0
Nicola Carey	New South Wales	7	7	53.0	3	235	12	3/26	19.58	26.5	0
Kristen Beams	Victoria	6	6	48.0	2	154	11	5/13	14.00	26.1	2
