= 2009–10 Rose Bowl series =

International cricket tour

The 2009–10 Rose Bowl series was held in Australia from 10 February to 23 February 2010 in which included five Women's One Day International matches were played in Adelaide and Melbourne. In addition, three Women's Twenty20 International were contested. Australia Women won the WODI series by 5–0 and New Zealand Women won the WT20I series by 3–0.

And also held in New Zealand from 26 February to 7 March 2010 in which included three Women's One Day International matches and in addition two Women's Twenty20 International matches were contested. New Zealand Women won the T20I series by 2–0 and Australia Women won the WODI series by 3–0.

== New Zealand in Australia ==
New Zealand women's cricket team in Australia 2009–10
	Australia women	New Zealand women
- Dates: 10 February – 23 February 2010

One Day International series
- Results: Australia women won the 5-match series 5–0

Twenty20 International series
- Results: New Zealand women won the 3-match series 3–0

=== WODI series ===
==== 1st WODI ====
10 February 2010
Scorecard

Australia; 241 (47.2 overs)	v	New Zealand; 126 (36.1 overs)
Rachael Haynes 56 (73); Kate Pulford 2/33 (8 overs)		Katey Martin 35 (45); Lisa Sthalekar 3/25 (8 overs)

Australia won by 115 runs
Adelaide Oval, Adelaide
Umpires: Andy Collins & Simon Fry

- New Zealand Women won the toss and elected to field.
- Alyssa Healy (Aus), Victoria Lind, Sian Ruck and Emma Campbell (NZ) are made their WODI debuts.

==== 2nd WODI ====
11 February 2010
Scorecard

New Zealand; 142 (37.3 overs)	v	Australia; 111/6 (29.5 overs)
Victoria Lind 33 (32); Shelley Nitschke 2/7 (7 overs)		Shelley Nitschke 38 (70); Amy Satterthwaite 3/18 (4.5 overs)

Australia by 4 wickets (D/L)
Adelaide Oval, Adelaide
Umpires: Andy Collins & Simon Fry

- New Zealand Women won the toss and elected to bat.
- Morna Nielsen (NZ) made her WODI debut.

==== 3rd WODI ====
14 February 2010
Scorecard

Australia; 238/7 (50 overs)	v	New Zealand; 136 (41.1 overs)
Alex Blackwell 92 (109); Aimee Watkins 4/60 (9 overs)		Aimee Watkins 22 (51); Shelley Nitschke 3/31 (10 overs)

Australia by 102 runs
Junction Oval, Melbourne
Umpires: Ashley Barrow & John Ward

- New Zealand Women won the toss and elected to field.
- Natalie Dodd (NZ) made her WODI debut.

==== 4th WODI ====
17 February 2010
Scorecard

New Zealand; 162 (49.3 overs)	v	Australia; 163/0 (32.3 overs)
Katey Martin 25 (47); Ellyse Perry 5/31 (9.3 overs)		Leah Poulton 106* (114)

Australia by 10 wickets
Junction Oval, Melbourne
Umpires: Ashley Barrow & John Ward

- New Zealand Women won the toss and elected to bat.

==== 5th WODI ====
18 February 2010
Scorecard

Australia; 240/8 (45 overs)	v	New Zealand; 137 (34 overs)
Rachael Haynes 75 (74); Abby Burrows 3/27 (5 overs)		Nicola Browne 37 (46); Shelley Nitschke 4/24 (9 overs)

Australia by 103 runs (D/L method)
Junction Oval, Melbourne
Umpires: Ashley Barrow and John Ward

- Australia Women won the toss and elected to bat.
- Match reduced to 45 overs per side due to rain.
- Julie Hunter (Aus) made her WODI debut.

=== WT20I series ===
==== 1st WT20I ====
21 February 2010
Scorecard

New Zealand; 117/7 (20 overs)	v	Australia; 115/7 (20 overs)
Aimee Watkins 44 (36); Shelley Nitschke 2/14 (4 overs)		Shelley Nitschke 46 (46); Sophie Devine 2/22 (4 overs)

New Zealand won by 2 runs
Bellerive Oval, Hobart
Umpires: Steven John and Sam Nogajski

- New Zealand Women won the toss and elected to bat.
- Rachael Haynes, Alyssa Healy (Aus); Erin Bermingham and Kate Ebrahim (NZ) are made their WT20I debuts.

==== 2nd WT20I ====
22 February 2010
Scorecard

New Zealand; 115/7 (20 overs)	v	Australia; 116/5 (16.5 overs)
Alex Blackwell 40 (38); Sophie Devine 3/24 (4 overs)		Sophie Devine 48 (31); Ellyse Perry 2/17 (4 overs)

New Zealand won by 5 wickets
Bellerive Oval, Hobart
Umpires: Nick McGann and Sam Nogajski

- Australia Women won the toss and elected to bat.

==== 3rd WT20I ====
23 February 2010
Scorecard

New Zealand; 141/7 (20 overs)	v	Australia; 134/7 (20 overs)
Maria Fahey 42 (45); Rene Farrell 2/25 (4 overs)		Shelley Nitschke 56 (45); Suzie Bates 2/18 (4 overs)

New Zealand won by 7 runs
Bellerive Oval, Hobart
Umpires: Steven John and Nick McGann

- New Zealand Women won the toss and elected to bat.

== Australia in New Zealand ==
Australia women's cricket team in New Zealand 2009–10
	New Zealand women	Australia women
- Dates: 26 February – 7 March 2010

One Day International series
- Results: Australia women won the 3-match series 3–0

Twenty20 International series
- Results: New Zealand women won the 2-match series 2–0

=== WT20I series ===
==== 1st WT20I ====
26 February 2010
Scorecard

New Zealand; 132/7 (20 overs)	v	Australia; 73 (15.3 overs)
Suzie Bates 48 (40); Rachael Haynes 3/19 (2 overs)		Ellyse Perry 15 (12); Aimee Watkins 3/8 (1.3 overs)

New Zealand won by 59 runs
Westpac Stadium, Wellington
Umpires: Barry Frost and Chris Gaffaney
Player of the match: Suzie Bates (NZ)

- New Zealand Women won the toss and elected to bat.
- Julie Hunter (Aus) made their WT20I debut.

==== 2nd WT20I ====
28 February 2010
Scorecard

New Zealand; 115/7 (20 overs)	v	Australia; 116/5 (16.5 overs)
Amy Satterthwaite 42 (47); Ellyse Perry 3/14 (4 overs)		Shelley Nitschke 45 (51); Suzie Bates 3/24 (4 overs)

New Zealand won by 17 runs
Lancaster Park, Christchurch
Umpires: Gary Baxter and Evan Watkin
Player of the match: Amy Satterthwaite (NZ)

- New Zealand Women won the toss and elected to bat.

=== WODI series ===
==== 1st WODI ====
3 March 2010
Scorecard

New Zealand; 228/6 (50 overs)	v	Australia; 229/8 (50 overs)
Sophie Devine 74* (82); Ellyse Perry 2/44 (10 overs)		Jess Duffin 68 (81); Amy Satterthwaite 2/24 (6 overs)

Australia won by 2 wickets
Queenstown Events Centre, Queenstown
Umpires: Barry Frost and Phil Jones

- New Zealand Women won the toss and elected to bat.

==== 2nd WODI ====
6 March 2010
Scorecard

New Zealand; 255/8 (50 overs)	v	Australia; 256/4 (47.3 overs)
Amy Satterthwaite 81 (96); Julie Hunter 3/40 (8 overs)		Shelley Nitschke 113* (130); Aimee Watkins 1/38 (10 overs)

Australia by 6 wickets
Queens Park, Invercargill
Umpires: Derek Walker and Tim Parlane

- New Zealand Women won the toss and elected to bat.

==== 3rd WODI ====
7 March 2010
Scorecard

New Zealand; 173 (44 overs)	v	Australia; 174/4 (37.2 overs)
Sara McGlashan 46 (49); Lisa Sthalekar 5/35 (8 overs)		Sarah Elliott 56* (80); Amy Satterthwaite 1/17 (4 overs)

Australia by 6 wickets
Queens Park, Invercargill
Umpires: Derek Walker and Tim Parlane

- New Zealand Women won the toss and elected to bat.
- Kate Ebrahim (NZ) made her WT20I debut.
