= Sarah Coyte =

Australian cricketer (born 1991)

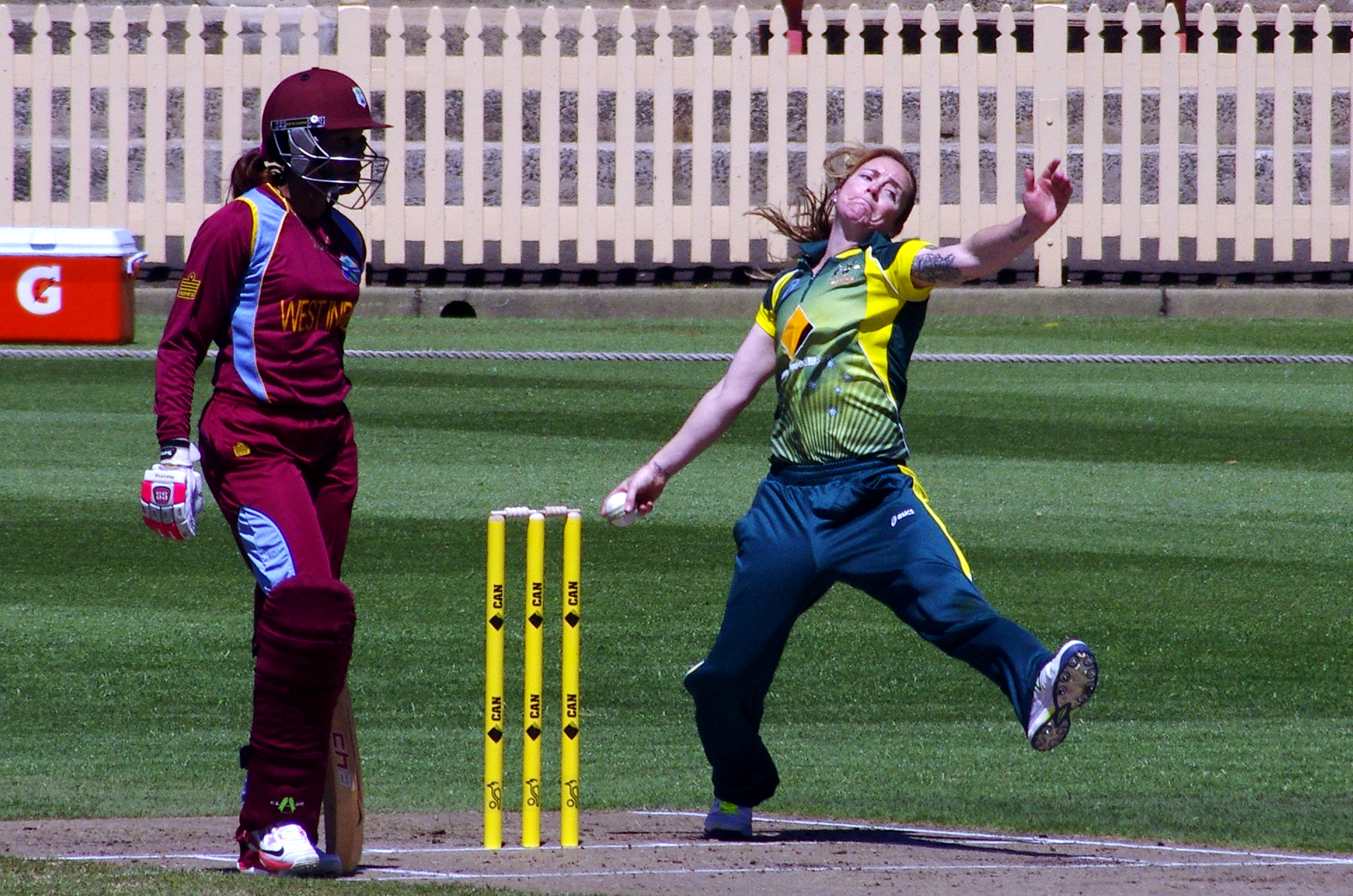
- Coyte bowling for Australia in 2014

Personal information
- Full name: Sarah Jane Coyte
- Born: 30 March 1991 (age 35); Camden, New South Wales, Australia
- Nickname: Coytey
- Batting: Right-handed
- Bowling: Right-arm medium fast
- Role: Bowler

International information
- National side: Australia
- Test debut (cap 160): 22 January 2011 v England
- Last Test: 11 August 2015 v England
- ODI debut (cap 118): 5 January 2011 v England
- Last ODI: 24 February 2016 v New Zealand
- T20I debut (cap 31): 30 December 2010 v New Zealand
- Last T20I: 1 March 2016 v New Zealand

Domestic team information
- Years: Team
- 2009/10–2014/15: New South Wales
- 2015/16–2016/17: South Australia
- 2015/16–2016/17: Adelaide Strikers
- 2017/18: Sydney Sixers
- 2018/19–2021/22: Adelaide Strikers
- 2019/20: Australian Capital Territory
- 2020/21–2022/23: Tasmania
- 2022/23–present: Melbourne Renegades
- 2023/24–present: New South Wales

Career statistics
Competition	WTest	WODI	WT20I
Matches	4	30	47
Runs scored	19	286	117
Batting average	4.75	22.00	13.00
100s/50s	0/0	0/1	0/0
Top score	9	51*	17*
Balls bowled	691	1,418	962
Wickets	9	44	47
Bowling average	20.66	22.27	20.82
5 wickets in innings	0	0	0
10 wickets in match	0	0	0
Best bowling	2/15	4/39	4/5
Catches/stumpings	0/–	4/–	15/–
- Source: ESPNcricinfo, 13 June 2020

Sarah Jane Coyte (born 30 March 1991) is an Australian cricketer. A right-arm medium fast bowler, Coyte has taken a total of 100 wickets for the national women's team across Tests, ODIs and T20Is. She currently plays for the Melbourne Renegades in the Women's Big Bash League (WBBL).

In addition to her bowling prowess, Coyte has proven to be a handy lower-order batter and notable performer in tournament finals. She has won two world championships with Australia, seven WNCL championships with New South Wales and South Australia, and one WBBL championship with the Sydney Sixers. Her successful cricket career was established and maintained despite an ongoing battle with anorexia nervosa and other mental health issues which prompted a premature, albeit temporary, retirement from the game in 2017.

== Domestic career ==
=== Women's National Cricket League ===
==== New South Wales ====
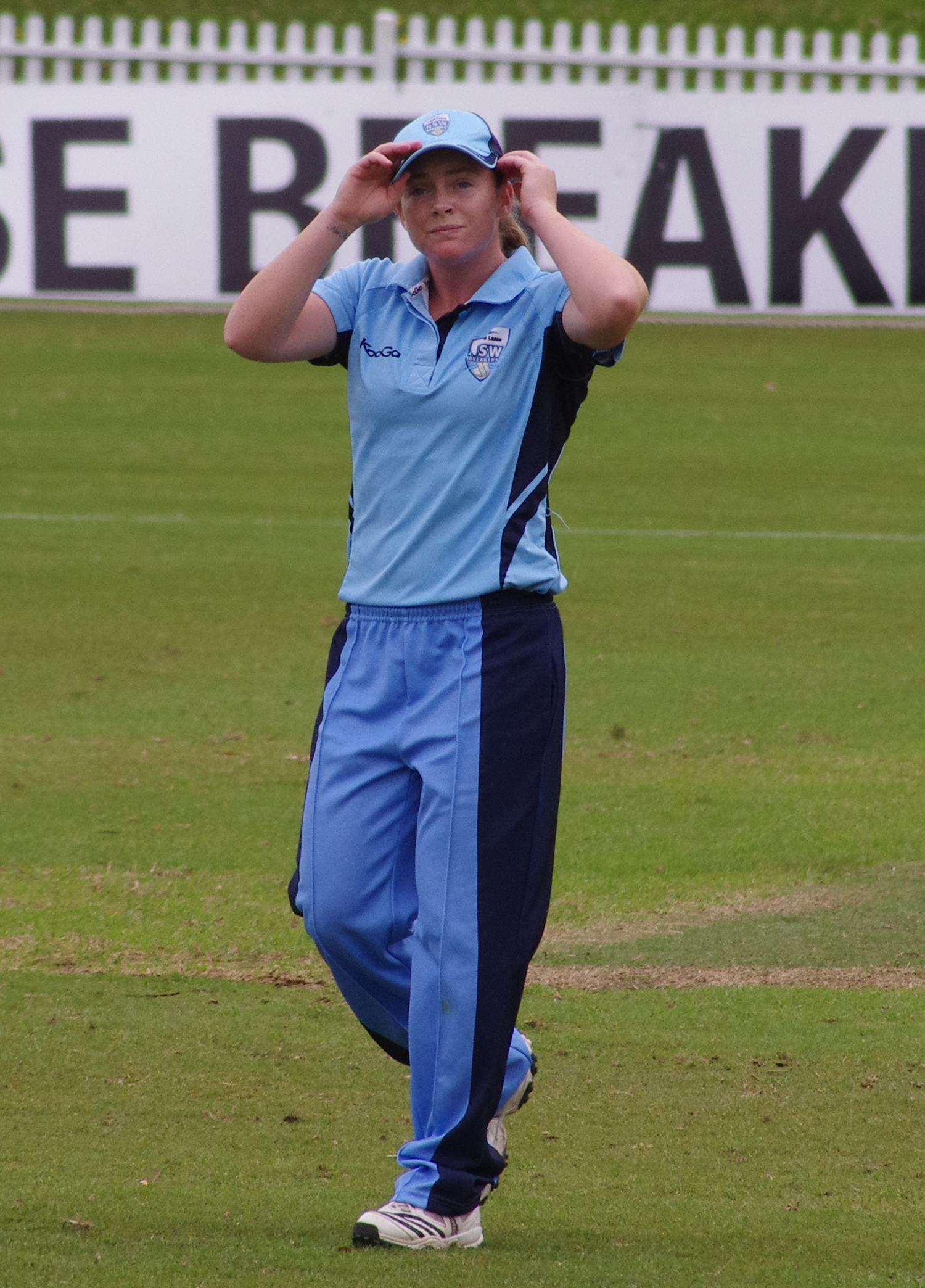
Coyte playing for the New South Wales Breakers in 2011

On 7 November 2009, Coyte made her WNCL debut playing for New South Wales in a 15-run win against Queensland, managing impressive bowling figures of 4/25 from six overs and helping to defend a total of 198. She finished the 2009–10 season with twelve wickets at an average of 15.16, having played all eleven matches including the 59-run win against Victoria in the final.

Coyte went on to be involved in five more successful campaigns with New South Wales in as many seasons. Her highlights included:

- In the 2010–11 final, she scored an unbeaten 44 from 47 balls in pursuit of Victoria's first innings total of 263. With rain prematurely ending play in the 35th over of the run chase, New South Wales were declared champions due to their score of 2/193 being comfortably ahead of the Duckworth–Lewis par by 49 runs.
- Coyte scored her first WNCL half-century on 3 December 2011 in a 37-run win against Victoria, scoring 54 off 57 balls. In the 2011–12 final, she took 4/53 from 9.4 overs to help secure a 70-run win, which was also against Victoria. She finished the season with eleven wickets, the third-most in the league, at an average of 21.27.
- In the 2012–13 final, Coyte took 2/34 from ten overs against Queensland. Chasing 233 for victory, she was not out on eleven with her team at 4/135 after 27 overs when rain interrupted and ultimately ended play. New South Wales were declared champions, having exceeded the Duckworth–Lewis par score by 15 runs.
- The 2013–14 final was also affected by rain, with the match reduced to 20-overs per innings. Coyte took 1/16 from four overs to help restrict Victoria to a total of 9/111 before New South Wales chased down the target with seven wickets and seven balls to spare.
- On 25 October 2014, Coyte recorded her best-ever WNCL bowling figures, taking 4/35 from ten overs in a two-wicket victory against Queensland. She also took 3/33 from 9.2 overs during the 2014–15 semi-final in a seven-wicket win over Victoria, then claimed 1/14 from seven overs in the final against South Australia which New South Wales went on to win by 144 runs. Coyte finished her last season with the team by taking ten wickets at an average of 20.70.

==== South Australia ====
During August 2015, Coyte announced she would leave New South Wales to play for South Australia. In the 2015–16 final, she took 1/24 from ten overs as South Australia claimed their first national title with a 54-run win. The victory brought an end to New South Wales' streak of ten-consecutive championships which Coyte helped to build.

Across the 2016–17 season, Coyte took nine wickets at an average of 24.88, although South Australia finished in fourth place and failed to qualify for the final. In March 2017, she announced her retirement from domestic cricket at the age of 25, citing a need to seek better balance in her life to combat mental health issues.

==== Australian Capital Territory ====
Coyte returned to the WNCL for the 2019–20 season, signing with the ACT Meteors in May 2019. She earned her first Player of the Match award with the team on 6 February 2020 against Tasmania, taking 2/30 from eight overs and then scoring 48 not out to help chase down a target of 199 with three wickets and 21 balls to spare. The Meteors finished the tournament in fifth place.

==== Tasmania ====
Opting to focus solely on Twenty20 cricket, Coyte did not sign with a WNCL team ahead of the 2020–21 season. However, she joined Tasmania midway through their campaign, debuting on 25 February 2021 against New South Wales at Blundstone Arena in a tied match. On 7 March, Coyte recorded her second WNCL half-century and highest score in the league, coming in to bat at 5/89 and managing 66 runs off 88 balls, though her team would nevertheless lose the match to Queensland by eight wickets.

In a similar scenario to the previous season, Coyte once again opted against signing with a state team during the 2021–22 contracting period, but Tasmania re-added her to their roster on the eve of the tournament.

==== New South Wales ====
Ahead of the 2023–24 season, Coyte was poached by New South Wales, where she was expected to benefit the team's 'talented but youthful' pace attack.

=== Women's Big Bash League ===
==== Adelaide Strikers: First stint ====
On 17 July 2015, the Adelaide Strikers announced they had signed Coyte for the inaugural Women's Big Bash League season. She earned her first Player of the Match award in the WBBL on 1 January 2016 at Adelaide Oval against the Perth Scorchers, scoring 52 not out from 38 balls to help chase down a target of 137 with six wickets and nine balls to spare. On 10 January, she delivered a dominant all-round performance against the Melbourne Stars at the Junction Oval, scoring 72 off 55 balls before taking 3/12 in a 50-run victory. Although the Strikers only finished in seventh place, Coyte had a strong individual campaign as the team's leading wicket-taker with 14 and scoring 243 runs.

The Strikers struggled throughout WBBL|02, winning just three games and finishing in last place on the ladder. Coyte experienced a slide in her own form, managing seven wickets at an average of 38.85 while contributing 26 runs from ten innings at a strike rate of 61.90. At the conclusion of the season, she announced her retirement from domestic cricket at the age of 25, citing a need to seek better balance in her life to combat mental health issues.

==== Sydney Sixers ====
Ahead of WBBL|03, Coyte turned down an offer to join the Hobart Hurricanes. During the 2017–18 Australian summer, she occasionally played in local games for Penrith which motivated Sydney Sixers coach Ben Sawyer to approach her about a temporary comeback to top-level domestic cricket. With South African pair Marizanne Kapp and Dane van Niekerk unavailable for the last few weeks of the WBBL season due to national team commitments, the Sixers signed Coyte as a marquee replacement player.

On 27 January 2018, in her return to the league, Coyte took match-best figures of 2/14 from four overs during a seven-wicket win against the Adelaide Strikers at Hurstville Oval. The following day, playing against the Strikers at Hurstville Oval once more, she was named Player of the Match for her bowling figures of 3/18 from four overs which helped the Sixers to another seven-wicket victory and clinch the minor premiership. In the final at Adelaide Oval on 4 February, she produced "exemplary bowling" to take 3/17 in the first innings which led to the Perth Scorchers being bowled out for just 99. The Sixers chased the target down with nine wickets in hand and 30 balls remaining to win the championship, while Coyte was named Player of the Final.

Reflecting upon a whirlwind resurgence, which included ten wickets in four matches at an average of 8.10, Coyte commented that her true personal victory came when she "walked out (onto the ground) at Hurstville" a week earlier. In a blog post for AthletesVoice, Coyte noted she hadn't committed to playing cricket full-time again: "I hope these last couple of weeks haven't added pressure with people asking me about coming back. That wasn't the intention... I wouldn't completely shut it down as an option but I wouldn't want to get everyone's hopes up either. I don't know what my state of mind is on this. It constantly changes. I ride the wave every single day."

==== Adelaide Strikers: Return ====
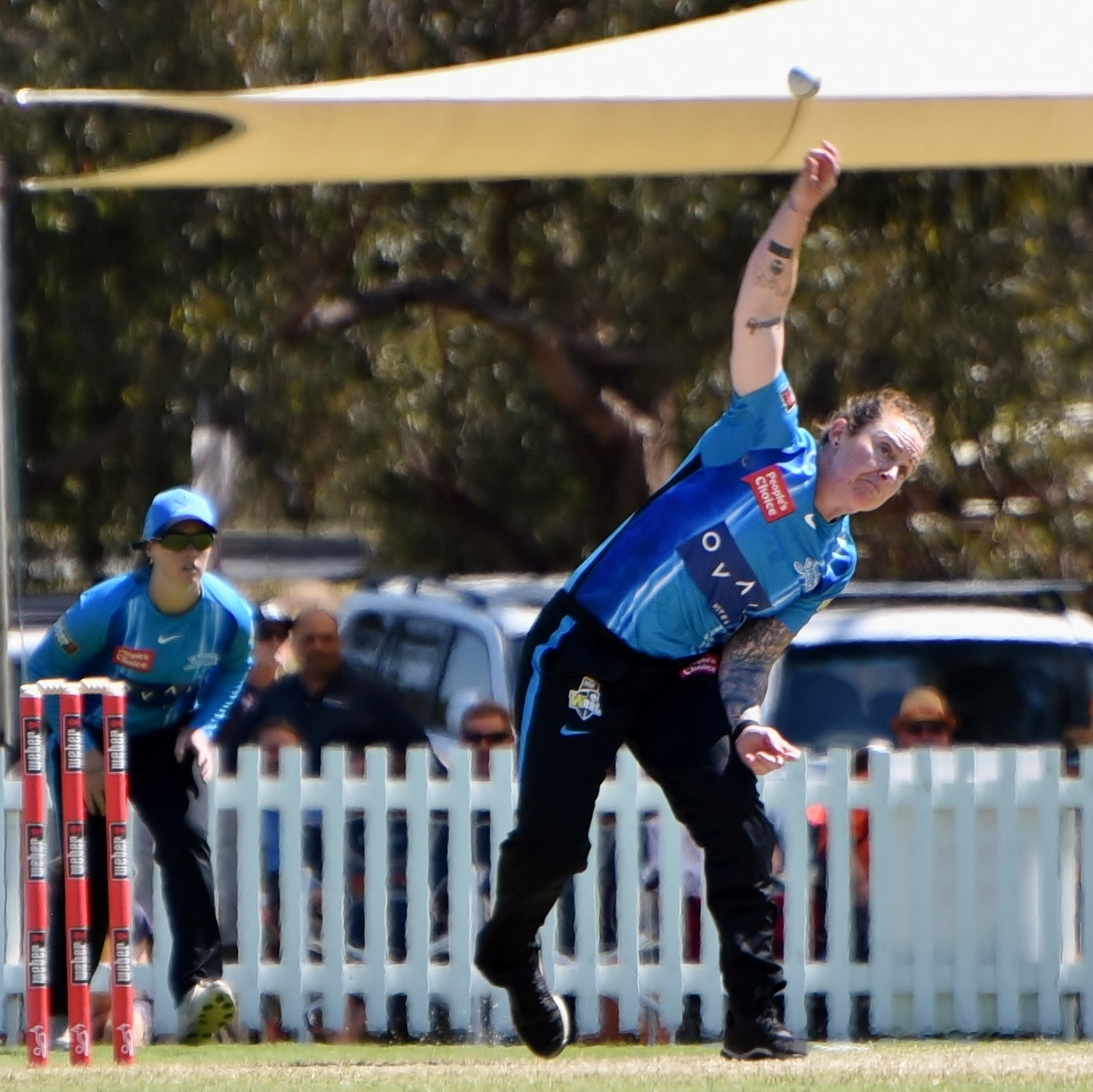
Coyte bowling for Adelaide Strikers during WBBL|07

On 14 June 2018, the Adelaide Strikers announced they had once again signed Coyte as a member of their squad. Speaking about her new two-season contract with the Strikers, she said: "I've been working really hard to find balance in my life over the last year or so and I feel I'm in a great place both physically and mentally. Now there is no pressure on me for national selection, I'm able to train and play well because I want to, not because I feel I have to."

Coyte enjoyed a highly productive WBBL|05 campaign, taking 19 wickets and helping the Strikers to reach their first championship final. She pulled off her first Player of the Match award of the season on 26 October 2019 in a low-scoring encounter with the Hobart Hurricanes at Allan Border Field. Her late-innings cameo of 24 from 13 balls proved critical in what would be a narrow three-run victory. She earned her second Player of the Match award of the season on 30 November, taking 3/9 off four overs in an eight-wicket win over the Sydney Sixers at Hurstville Oval. Coyte managed bowling figures of 1/27 from four overs in the WBBL|05 final on 8 December against the Brisbane Heat at Allan Border Field. The Strikers ended up losing the match by six wickets to finish the tournament as runners-up.

Although the Strikers failed to qualify for the 2020–21 finals series, Coyte earned acclaim for her individual WBBL|06 exploits. Finishing with 18 wickets (the equal-most during the regular season) at an economy rate of 6.51, she excelled in the high-pressure death bowling role and was subsequently selected in the Team of the Tournament.

== International career ==
=== Debut in all three formats ===
On 30 December 2010, Coyte made her international debut in a Twenty20 against New Zealand at Saxton Oval. She took two wickets for 18 runs off four overs in the first innings as well effecting two run outs. Then, batting down the order at eight, she scored 14 not out in the second innings to help Australia win with just two balls remaining. Her outstanding debut was punctuated with Player of the Match honours.

On 5 January 2011, Coyte played her first One Day International in a match against England at the WACA. A rain-affected encounter, she scored ten not out and took 1/44 off 7.3 overs with Australia winning by 33 runs (via the Duckworth–Lewis method). Like her maiden T20I appearance, Coyte's ODI debut coincided with that of future Australian team captain Meg Lanning.

On 22 January 2011, Coyte made her Test debut in a match against England at Bankstown Oval. Her only wicket of the game came in the second innings, dismissing Heather Knight via lbw for 19. Coyte also recorded the unenviable feat of making a golden duck in her first Test batting innings, though it ultimately proved trivial as Australia went on to win the match by seven wickets.

=== 2012 World Twenty20 ===
On 23 June 2011, Coyte took career-best T20I bowling figures of 4/5 from four overs during an eight-wicket victory against India at the Toby Howe Cricket Ground. Then, on 7 July 2011, she took career-best ODI bowling figures of 4/39 from ten overs during a quadrangular series final at Sir Paul Getty's Ground. Despite her efforts, England still managed to win by 34 runs. She finished with twelve wickets across Australia's four matches in the series, which also involved New Zealand and India, at an average of just 13.00.

Coyte was selected as a member of Australia's squad for the 2012 World Twenty20 in Sri Lanka. However, she was unable to "keep any food down" while on tour and was sent home before the first match of the tournament. At the time, Coyte told Cricket Australia her illness was simply a case of "Delhi belly". Years later, she revealed she was actually suffering from anorexia nervosa.

=== 2013 Cricket World Cup ===
In the second ODI of the 2012–13 Rose Bowl series on 14 December, Coyte scored her only international half-century and finished on an unbeaten 51 from 54 deliveries to help Australia chase down New Zealand's total of 288 with four wickets in hand.

Coyte reiterated her batting competency in a super-six match at the 2013 Cricket World Cup against England on 8 February, top-scoring for Australia with 44 off 81 balls. The 82-run stand she put on with Lisa Sthalekar helped the team recover from an early collapse to post a total of 147. In the second innings, Coyte took the wicket of Laura Marsh to break a similarly significant 57-run partnership. Australia eventually bowled England out for 145 to win by two runs. They went on to claim the world championship with a 114-run defeat of the West Indies in the tournament's final.

=== 2014 World Twenty20 ===
In the 2014 World Twenty20 final, Coyte took 3/16 from four overs, which included claiming the top-order wickets of Charlotte Edwards and Sarah Taylor, to help restrict England to a first innings total of just 8/105. Australia chased down the target with six wickets and 29 balls to spare and would "coast" to their third-consecutive T20 world championship, while Coyte was named Player of the Match.

In the only Test of the 2015 Women's Ashes series, Coyte claimed career-best match figures of 4/45 from 30.1 overs in a 161-run victory. Her economical bowling was paired with key breakthrough wickets, dismissing opener Heather Knight cheaply twice and removing Katherine Brunt for 39 (the top score for England in the first innings). Australia went on to regain the Ashes during the T20I portion of the series through a 20-run win on 28 August at the County Ground in Hove, with Coyte taking 1/12 off four overs.

=== International retirement ===
Coyte was selected as a member of Australia's squad for the 2016 World Twenty20, in which the team finished as runners-up, but she did not play a match throughout the tournament. In March 2017, Coyte announced her retirement from all forms of international cricket at the age of 25, citing a need to seek better balance in her life to combat mental health issues.

== Personal life ==
Coyte has a twin brother, Adam, who was a member of the Sydney Thunder in the Big Bash League. Her older brother, Scott Coyte, was also a member of the Thunder as well as making ten Sheffield Shield appearances with New South Wales.

In February 2019, Coyte married her fiancé Bec Cady. The couple became foster parents of an eight-year-old boy in July 2019. Despite legally taking on her wife's surname, Coyte is still more commonly referred to by her maiden name throughout the cricket community and in the media. She claims not to have a nickname.

Since her late-teens, Coyte has suffered from anorexia nervosa. Her battle with the disorder manifested in severe weight loss while she also struggled with anxiety, depression and an obsessive training regimen. At one stage of her cricket career, she vomited after every meal for eight months. Whilst touring the United Kingdom in 2015, Coyte resorted to excessive alcohol intake: "I'm not proud of it but I was pretty much drunk every night trying to deal with it." During a tour of India, she slept three-to-four hours a night and consumed nothing more than Red Bull, protein bars, and the occasional serve of steamed vegetables.

Coyte lives in Spring Farm and, in addition to playing cricket, works as a personal trainer at a gym in Campbelltown. She has also worked full-time as a School Learning Support Officer at the Reiby Juvenile Justice Detention Centre.

== Honours ==
=== Team ===
- Women's Cricket World Cup champion: 2013
- ICC Women's World Twenty20 champion: 2014
- 7x Women's National Cricket League champion: 2009–10, 2010–11, 2011–12, 2012–13, 2013–14, 2014–15, 2015–16
- Women's Big Bash League champion: 2017–18
- 2x Australian Women's Twenty20 Cup champion: 2012–13, 2014–15

=== Individual ===
- ICC Women's World Twenty20 Player of the Final: 2014
- Cricket NSW Rising Star: 2010–11
- Women's Big Bash League Player of the Final: 2017–18
