= Alice Wegemund =

Australian cricketer

Cricket information
- Batting: Right-handed
- Role: Wicket-keeper

International information
- National side: Australia
- Test debut: 26 June 1937 v England
- Last Test: 10 July 1937 v England

Career statistics
Competition	WTest
Matches	2
Runs scored	14
Batting average	4.66
100s/50s	0/0
Top score
Balls bowled
Wickets
Bowling average
5 wickets in innings
10 wickets in match
Best bowling
Catches/stumpings	2/5
- Source: ESPNcricinfo

Alice Wegemund (born 7 June 1907 - died 1976) was an Australian cricket player. Wegemund played for New South Wales Women's, as well as two Tests for the Australia national women's cricket team.
