= 2011–12 Women's National Cricket League season =

Cricket tournament

Women's National Cricket League 2011–12 season
- Dates: 22 October 2011 – 14 January 2012
- Administrator: Cricket Australia
- Cricket format: Limited overs cricket (50 overs)
- Tournament format(s): Round-robin and final
- Champions: New South Wales (14th title)
- Runners-up: Victoria
- Participants: 7
- Matches: 22
- Player of the series: (New South Wales) Leah Poulton (New South Wales) Lisa Sthalekar
- Most runs: (New South Wales) Rachael Haynes (402)
- Most wickets: (New South Wales) Lisa Sthalekar (15)
- Official website: cricket.com.au

The 2011–12 Women's National Cricket League season was the 16th season of the Women's National Cricket League, the women's domestic limited overs cricket competition in Australia. The tournament started on 22 October 2011 and finished on 14 January 2012. Defending champions New South Wales Breakers won the tournament for the 14th time after topping the ladder at the conclusion of the group stage and beating Victorian Spirit in the final.

== Ladder ==
As of 8 January 2012

Pos	Team	Pld	W	L	T	NR	BP	Pts	NRR
1	New South Wales	6	6	0	0	0	9	33	2.831
2	Victoria	6	4	1	0	1	5	23	1.445
3	Australian Capital Territory	6	3	3	0	0	3	15	−0.569
4	South Australia	6	3	3	0	0	2	14	−0.307
5	Queensland	6	2	4	0	0	2	10	−0.758
6	Tasmania	6	1	4	0	1	0	6	−1.359
7	Western Australia	6	1	5	0	0	1	5	−0.917

Updated to match(es) played on 8 January 2012. Source:
Rules for classification: The top two ranked teams qualified for the final.
- Points system: 4 for a win, 2 each for a tie or a no result and 0 for a loss.
- Bonus point system: 2 for win with a run rate twice that of the opposition, 1 for win with a run rate 1.25 times that of the opposition.

== Fixtures ==
=== Round-robin phase ===
Match 1
22 October 2011
Scorecard

South Australia	v	Australian Capital Territory (home team)

ACT won by 7 wickets (with 76 balls remaining)
Manuka Oval, Canberra

Match 2
22 October 2011
Scorecard

Tasmania	v	Queensland (home team)

Queensland won by 6 wickets (with 82 balls remaining)
Allan Border Field, Brisbane

Match 3
22 October 2011
Scorecard

(home team) Western Australia	v	New South Wales

New South Wales won by 8 wickets (with 158 balls remaining)
WACA Ground, Perth

Match 4
29 October 2011
Scorecard

Tasmania	v	Australian Capital Territory (home team)

ACT won by 7 wickets (with 87 balls remaining)
Manuka Oval, Canberra

Match 5
29 October 2011
Scorecard

(home team) New South Wales	v	South Australia

New South Wales won by 167 runs
Manly Oval, Sydney

Match 6
29 October 2011
Scorecard

(home team) Victoria	v	Queensland

Victoria won by 90 runs
Melbourne Cricket Ground, Melbourne

Match 7
12 November 2011
Scorecard

(home team) Queensland	v	Australian Capital Territory

Queensland won by 54 runs
Allan Border Field, Brisbane

Match 8
12 November 2011
Scorecard

South Australia	v	Tasmania (home team)

South Australia won by 56 runs
Bellerive Oval, Hobart

Match 9
12 November 2011
Scorecard

Victoria	v	Western Australia (home team)

Victoria won by 68 runs
Murdoch University Ground, Perth

Match 10
26 November 2011
Scorecard

(home team) Australian Capital Territory	v	New South Wales

New South Wales won by 7 wickets (with 184 balls remaining)
Manuka Oval, Canberra

Match 11
26 November 2011
Scorecard

(home team) South Australia	v	Western Australia

South Australia won by 92 runs
Park 25, Adelaide

Match 12
26 November 2011
Scorecard

(home team) Victoria	v	Tasmania

Match abandoned
Camberwell Sports Ground, Melbourne

Match 13
3 December 2011
Scorecard

(home team) New South Wales	v	Victoria

New South Wales won by 37 runs
Blacktown Olympic Park Oval, Sydney

Match 14
3 December 2011
Scorecard

(home team) South Australia	v	Queensland

South Australia won by 32 runs
Woodville Oval, Adelaide

Match 15
3 December 2011
Scorecard

Western Australia	v	Tasmania (home team)

Tasmania won by 7 runs (D/L method)
Kingston Twin Ovals, Hobart

Match 16
17 December 2011
Scorecard

Queensland	v	New South Wales (home team)

New South Wales won by 8 wickets (with 158 balls remaining)
Drummoyne Oval, Sydney

Match 17
17 December 2011
Scorecard

Victoria	v	South Australia (home team)

Victoria won by 46 runs
Parkinson Oval, Adelaide

Match 18
17 December 2011
Scorecard

Australian Capital Territory	v	Western Australia (home team)

ACT won by 67 runs
Murdoch University Ground, Perth

Match 19
7 January 2012
Scorecard

(home team) Queensland	v	Western Australia

Western Australia won by 9 wickets (with 138 balls remaining)
Allan Border Field, Brisbane

Match 20
7 January 2012
Scorecard

New South Wales	v	Tasmania (home team)

New South Wales won by 134 runs
Bellerive Oval, Hobart

Match 21
8 January 2012
Scorecard

Australian Capital Territory	v	Victoria (home team)

Victoria won by 7 wickets (with 217 balls remaining)
Melbourne Cricket Ground, Melbourne

== Final ==
14 January 2012
Scorecard

New South Wales; 7/310 (50 overs)	v	Victoria; 240 (41.4 overs)
Rachael Haynes 156 (139); Julie Hunter 2/39 (8 overs)		Elyse Villani 75 (83); Sarah Coyte 4/53 (9.4 overs)

New South Wales won by 70 runs
Sydney Cricket Ground
Umpires: Tony Wilds and Michael Kumutat
Player of the match: Rachael Haynes (New South Wales)

- Victoria won the toss and elected to field.
- New South Wales won the 2011–12 Women's National Cricket League.

== Statistics ==
=== Highest totals ===
Team	Score	Against	Venue	Date
New South Wales	6/335	Tasmania	Bellerive Oval, Hobart	7 January 2012
New South Wales	7/310	Victoria	Sydney Cricket Ground	14 January 2012
New South Wales	4/300	South Australia	Manly Oval, Sydney	29 October 2011
New South Wales	8/275	Victoria	Blacktown International Sportspark, Sydney	3 December 2011
South Australia	5/270	Tasmania	Bellerive Oval, Hobart	12 November 2011

=== Most runs ===
Player	Team	Mat	Inns	NO	Runs	HS	Ave	BF	SR	100	50
Rachael Haynes	New South Wales	7	7	0	402	156	57.42	403	99.75	1	2
Alex Blackwell	New South Wales	7	7	4	310	132*	103.33	362	85.63	1	2
Meg Lanning	Victoria	6	6	0	288	127	48.00	325	88.61	1	1
Leah Poulton	New South Wales	7	7	1	254	83*	42.33	286	88.81	0	3
Laura Wright	Australian Capital Territory	6	6	1	236	96*	47.20	393	60.05	0	2

=== Most wickets ===
Player	Team	Mat	Inns	Overs	Mdns	Runs	Wkts	BBI	Ave	SR	4WI
Lisa Sthalekar	New South Wales	7	7	48.5	4	178	15	4/12	11.86	19.5	1
Renee Chappell	Western Australia	6	6	50.0	3	203	14	3/32	14.50	21.4	0
Sarah Coyte	New South Wales	7	7	48.4	2	234	11	4/53	21.27	26.5	1
Lynsey Askew	Australian Capital Territory	6	6	41.5	3	153	10	4/24	15.30	25.1	1
Charlotte Anneveld	Australian Capital Territory	6	6	40.0	2	155	10	3/27	15.60	24.0	0
