= Rachael Haynes =

Australian cricketer (born 1986)

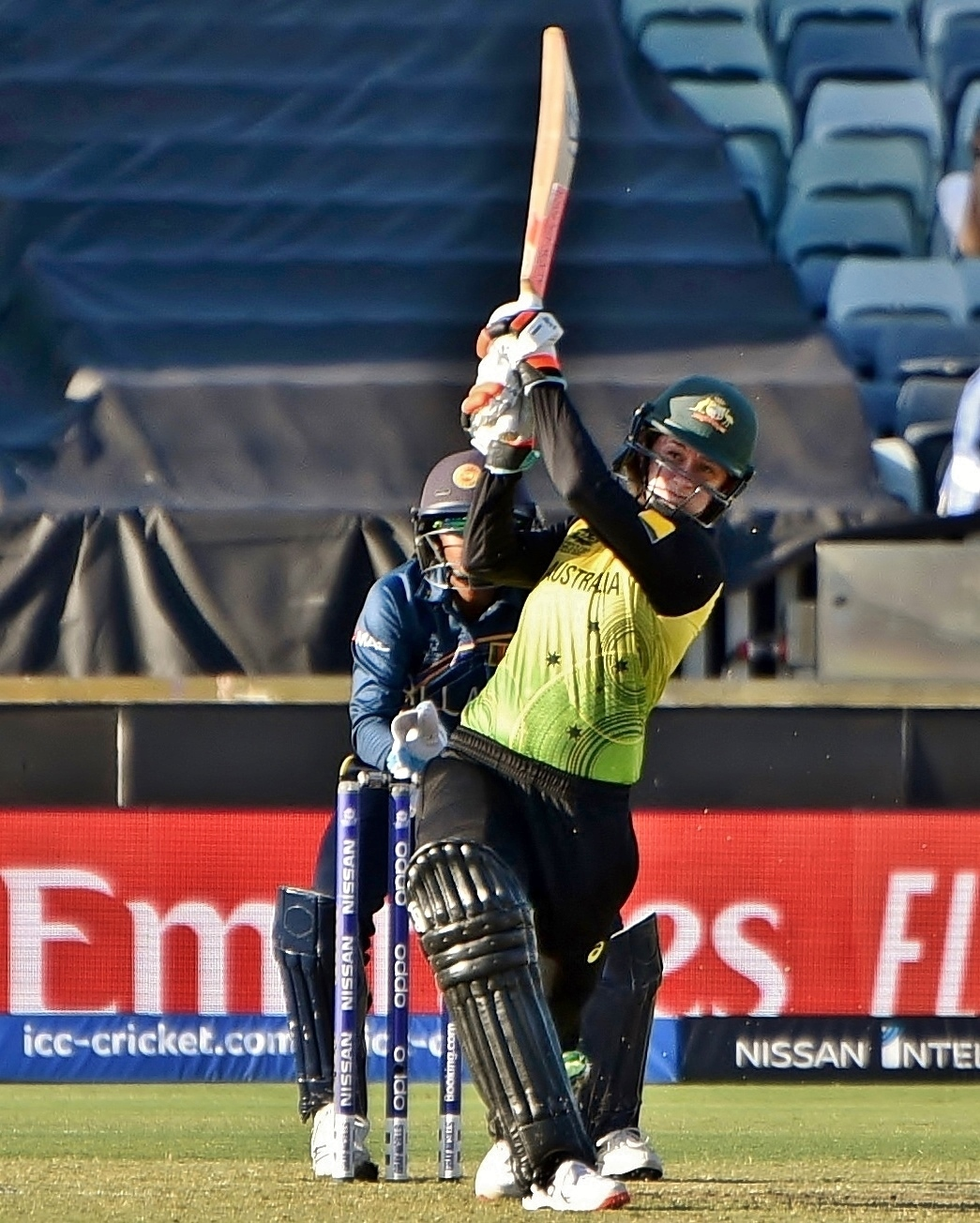
- Haynes during the 2020 ICC Women's T20 World Cup

Personal information
- Full name: Rachael Louise Haynes
- Born: 26 December 1986 (age 39); Carlton, Victoria, Australia
- Nickname: Des, Dessie
- Height: 1.63 m (5 ft 4 in)
- Batting: Left-handed
- Bowling: Left-arm medium
- Role: Batter
- Relatives: Leah Poulton (wife)

International information
- National side: Australia (2009–2022)
- Test debut (cap 157): 10 July 2009 v England
- Last Test: 27 January 2022 v England
- ODI debut (cap 115): 7 July 2009 v England
- Last ODI: 3 April 2022 v England
- ODI shirt no.: 7
- T20I debut (cap 28): 21 February 2010 v New Zealand
- Last T20I: 7 August 2022 v India
- T20I shirt no.: 7

Domestic team information
- Years: Team
- 2005/06–2010/11: Victoria
- 2011/12–2021/22: New South Wales
- 2015/16–2022/23: Sydney Thunder
- 2018: Loughborough Lightning
- 2022: Welsh Fire

Career statistics
Competition	Test	ODI	T20I
Matches	6	77	84
Runs scored	383	2,585	850
Batting average	34.81	39.80	26.56
100s/50s	0/3	2/19	0/3
Top score	98	130	69*
Balls bowled	156	108	44
Wickets	2	7	4
Bowling average	27.00	13.42	18.50
5 wickets in innings	0	0	0
10 wickets in match	0	0	0
Best bowling	1/0	3/10	3/19
Catches/stumpings	3/–	25/–	29/–
Medal record
Women's Cricket
Representing Australia
Commonwealth Games
Gold medal – first place	2022 Birmingham
World Cup
Winner	2013 India
Winner	2022 New Zealand
T20 World Cup
Winner	2010 West Indies
Winner	2012 Sri Lanka
Winner	2018 West Indies
Winner	2020 Australia
Winner	2023 South Africa
- Source: ESPNcricinfo, 5 February 2023

Rachael Louise Haynes (born 26 December 1986) is an Australian former international cricketer who has won six world championships as a member of the national women's team. A left-handed batter, Haynes was vice-captain of Australia from 2017 to 2022. Domestically, she achieved prolonged success in the Women's National Cricket League (WNCL) and the Women's Big Bash League (WBBL), winning seven titles with New South Wales and two with the Sydney Thunder.

== Early life and education ==
In her earliest backyard cricket memories, Haynes recalls using a bat carved from a fence paling while playing with her cousins and "always" watching matches on television, which led her to idolising Shane Warne before being inspired by Belinda Clark and Cathryn Fitzpatrick. Accepting an invitation from a next-door neighbour, Haynes joined North Balwyn Cricket Club at age eleven in her first formal experience with the sport. Soon after, she was lured to Box Hill Cricket Club and would go on to play at senior level alongside future Australian teammate Meg Lanning.

Haynes attended Our Lady of Sion College, completing her VCE in 2004. After obtaining a Diploma of Management from Box Hill Institute, she studied at the Australian Catholic University and graduated with a Bachelor's degree in marketing. She has also undertaken a Master of Business Administration degree at the University of Southern Queensland.

== Domestic and franchise career ==
=== Women's National Cricket League ===
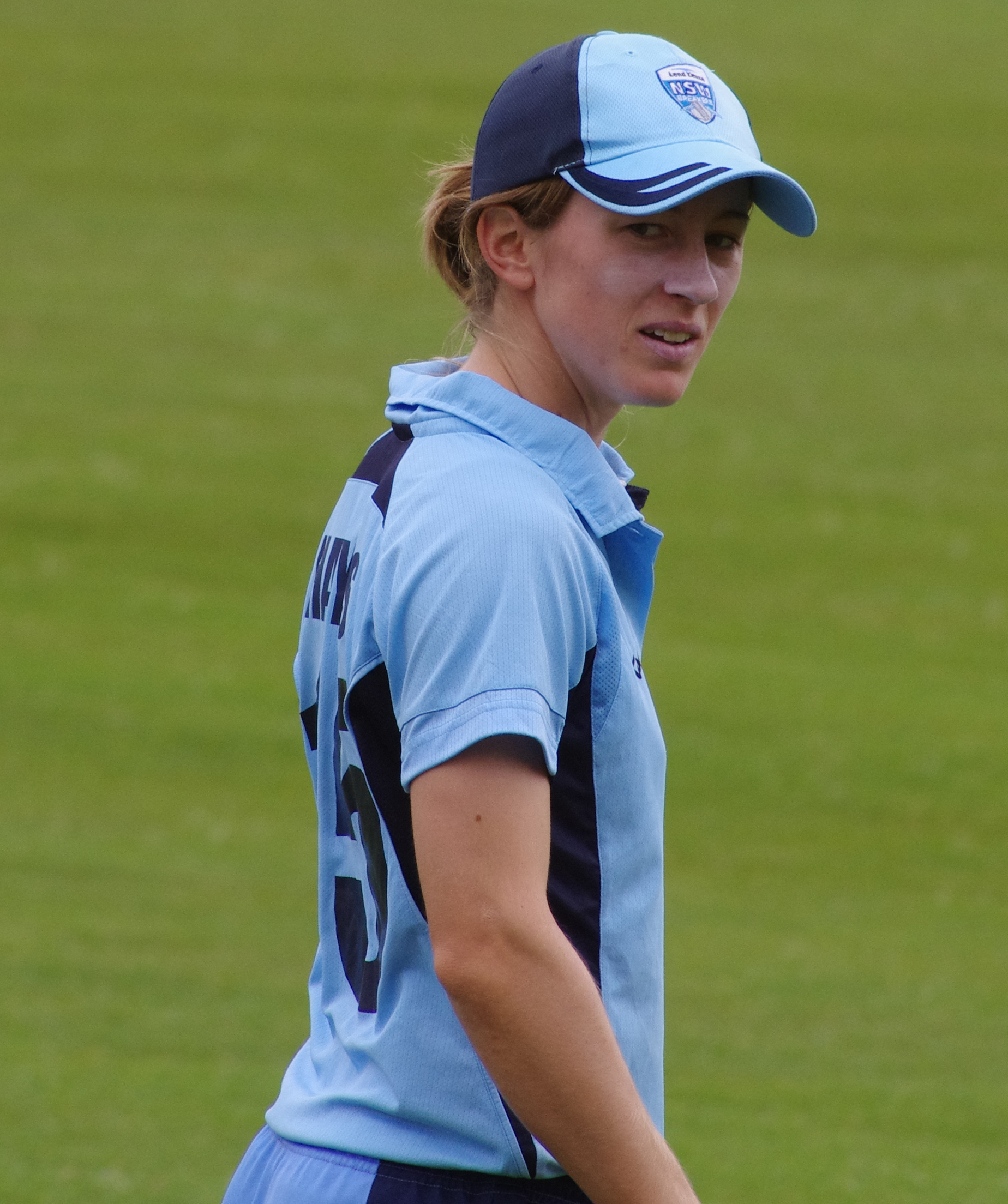
Haynes playing for the New South Wales Breakers in 2011.

Haynes made her WNCL debut for Victoria during the 2005–06 season. She scored 83 not out in the second final of the 2006–07 season to help defeat New South Wales by eight wickets, but her team lost the deciding match by three wickets. In 2008–09, Haynes broke through for her maiden century and ended the season as the fourth-highest run-scorer with 357 at an average of 44.62. Her strong campaign ended on a sour note when she was run out for a duck in the final. Haynes was also the fifth-highest run-scorer of the 2009–10 season, making 397 at 39.70. She then followed up as the league's second-highest run-scorer in 2010–11 (making 284 at 56.80) and top-scored for her team in the final with 68 off 76 balls, though Victoria suffered defeat in the championship decider at the hands of New South Wales for a third-consecutive season.

Ahead of the 2011–12 season, Haynes moved to Sydney and joined New South Wales' WNCL team. She topped the league for most runs with 402 at an average of 57.42, which included an innings of 156 from 139 balls in the final, helping to defeat her former Victorian team by 70 runs. Haynes would go on to win another six championships with New South Wales. Her highlights during that time included the following standout performances:

- In the 2013–14 final, Haynes proved herself as a capable left-arm medium pace bowler, taking three wickets for 20 runs in a match shortened to 20 overs per team due to rain. In the run chase, she scored 33 not out off 29 balls to help secure a seven-wicket victory.
- Haynes was the fifth-highest run-scorer across 2014–15, compiling 327 at 46.71. She earned her second-straight Player of the Final award, making 79 off 89 in a 144-run defeat of South Australia in the championship decider.
- Amassing the second-most runs throughout the 2017–18 season, scoring 363 at an average of 90.75, Haynes was named Player of the Tournament while her team defeated Western Australia by 51 runs in the final.
- Haynes was the top-scorer of the 2018–19 final against Queensland, making 79 off 105 deliveries in a 31-run victory.

=== Women's Big Bash League ===
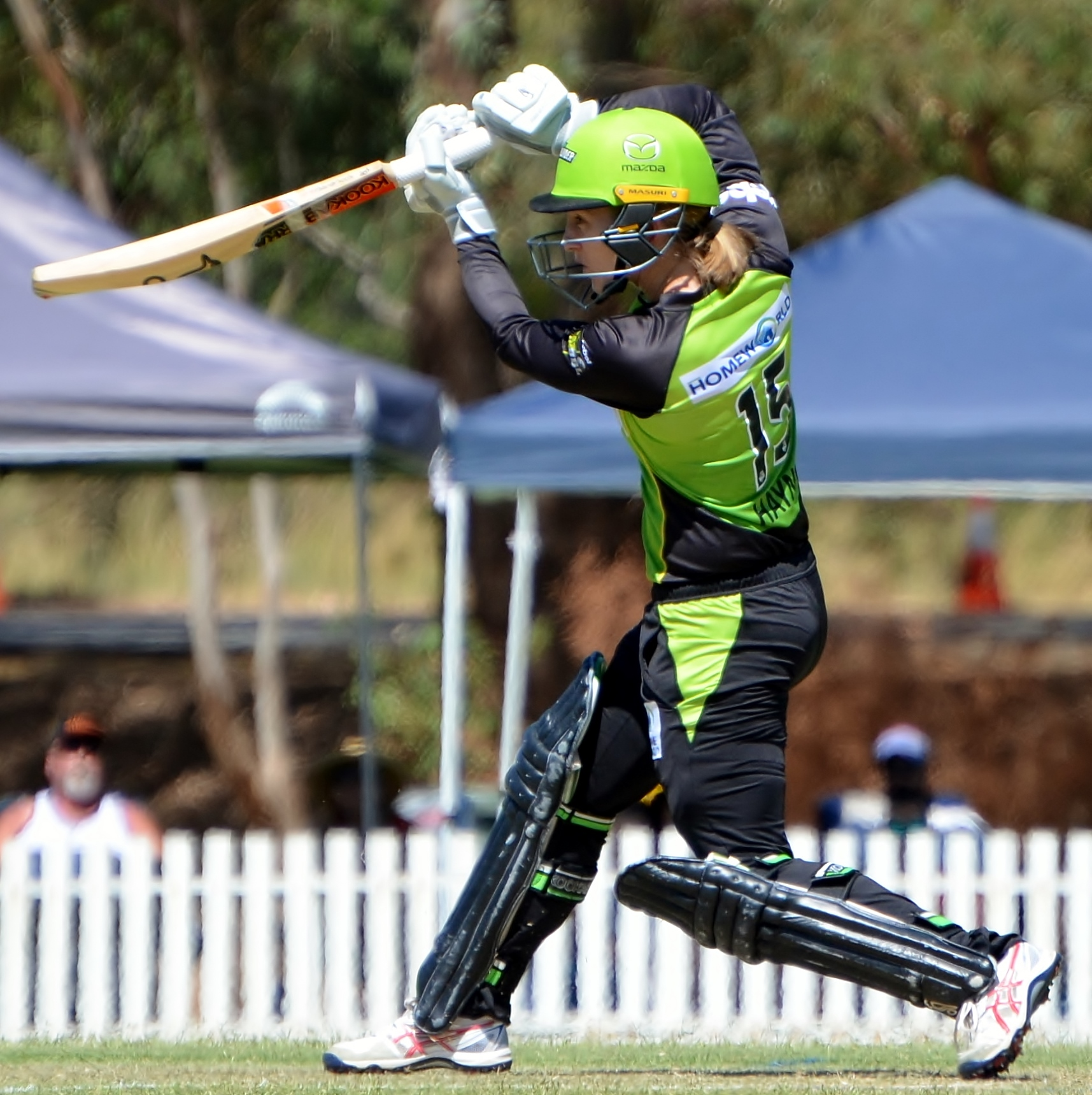
Haynes batting for Sydney Thunder at Lilac Hill Park in 2018.

Haynes signed with the Sydney Thunder for the inaugural WBBL season. In the final against the Sydney Sixers at the Melbourne Cricket Ground on 24 January 2016, she top-scored with 37 runs to help the Thunder secure a three-wicket victory and claim the league's maiden title.

The leading run-scorer for the Thunder across WBBL|03 with 426, Haynes was named her team's Most Valuable Player for the season. She led the way with the bat again in WBBL|04, compiling 376 at an average of 31.33. Her team ended the regular season in second place, but they were knocked out of the tournament by the Brisbane Heat in an "incredible" semi-final at Drummoyne Oval on 19 January 2019 which was noted for its close finish.

Ahead of WBBL|05, Haynes extended her contract with the Thunder and assumed the captaincy of the team, taking over from Alex Blackwell. After an underwhelming 2019–20 campaign, she rebounded emphatically the following season, leading her team to claim the WBBL|06 title. Scoring 21 not out in the championship decider at North Sydney Oval, Haynes was the only member of the Thunder playing XI to have also featured in the team's inaugural final triumph.

=== Other leagues ===
In April 2022, she was bought by the Welsh Fire for the 2022 season of The Hundred in England.

== International career ==
=== 2009: ODI and Test debut ===
At the end of the 2008–09 season, Haynes was selected in the Australia Youth team for a three-match series against New Zealand A but was unable to make a substantial score, aggregating 26 runs at 13.00 as the series was drawn 1–1. Later in the year, she was selected for the national squad's tour of England. Haynes made her international debut in an ODI against England at Lord's on 7 July 2009. She scored 26 from 45 balls before being bowled by Holly Colvin. The match was abandoned due to rain before Australia's innings was completed.

Haynes made her Test debut three days later at New Road, Worcester. Australia batted first and collapsed to be 5/28 after the first hour, bringing Haynes to the crease to join captain Jodie Fields. The pair added a record sixth-wicket partnership of 228 runs from 75.3 overs. Narrowly missing a century on debut, Haynes was bowled by Laura Marsh for 98, which caused stumps to be called at 7/271. The following day, she bowled four overs without conceding a run and claimed her maiden Test wicket by dismissing Nicky Shaw as Australia took a 41-run first innings lead. Haynes scored 16 in the second innings as the visitors set England a target of 273 for victory. The home team reached 3/106 before insufficient time ensured the match ended in a draw.

=== 2010: T20I debut ===
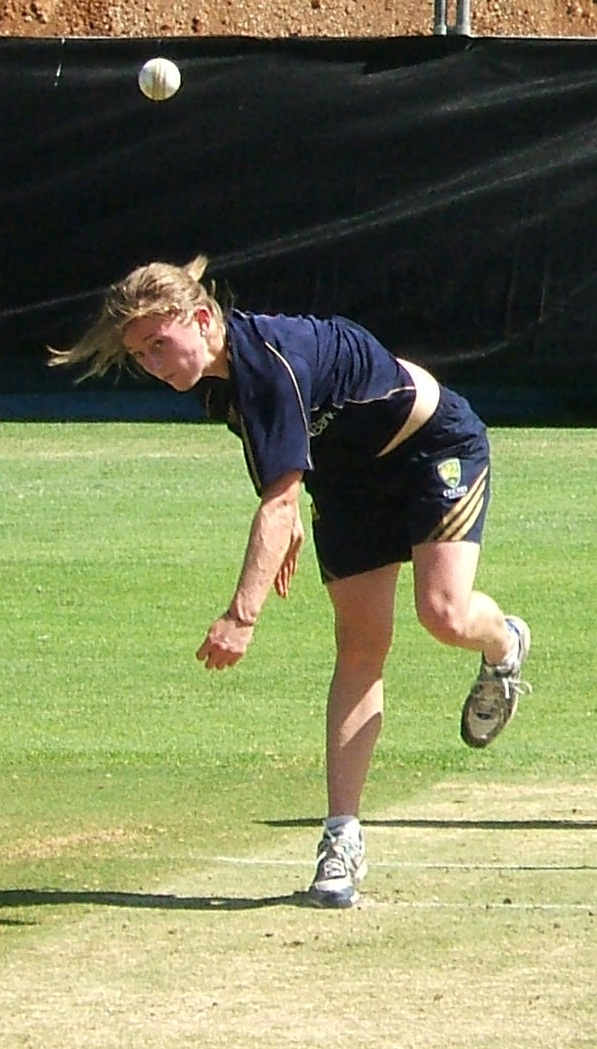
Haynes bowling in the Adelaide Oval nets.

Haynes performed strongly as both an opener and middle-order batter during the 2009–10 Rose Bowl series against New Zealand. In the first ODI at Adelaide Oval, she put on a 102-run opening partnership with Shelley Nitschke, top-scoring with 56 from 73 balls and helping the hosts to a 115-run win. In the fifth match at the Junction Oval, she came in at number five and hit an unbeaten 75 from 74 balls to set up a 103-run win which sealed a 5–0 clean sweep. Haynes ended the series with 173 runs at 86.50.

On 21 February 2010, Haynes made her T20 International debut at Bellerive Oval against New Zealand. She batted at number 6 and was unbeaten on 14 but was left watching from the non-striker's end while Alyssa Healy was out caught-behind on the last ball of the match, resulting in a two-run loss for Australia. She then picked up career-best T20I bowling figures on 26 February at Westpac Stadium, taking 3/19 from two overs in a 59-run loss to New Zealand.

Haynes was selected for the 2010 World Twenty20 in the Caribbean but did not play a game during the tournament. Australia would win the championship by defeating New Zealand in the final.

=== 2011–2012: Ashes and World Twenty20 success ===
In the only Test of the 2010–11 Women's Ashes, at Bankstown Oval, Haynes scored just 21 and four across two innings. She did, however, make a crucial contribution with the ball on the first afternoon by dismissing Jenny Gunn for 33, breaking up a 65-run stand between Gunn and Charlotte Edwards (England's largest partnership of the match). Australia went on to win by seven wickets, thereby regaining the Ashes for the first time in eight years.

Haynes was selected for the 2012 World Twenty20 in Sri Lanka, though she had little opportunity to bat despite playing in all but one game. Her most significant performance of the tournament came in the semi-final against the West Indies, when she played a late-innings cameo of 15 from 12 balls in a low-scoring encounter which Australia won by 28 runs. Her team defeated England by four runs in the final to claim back-to-back T20 world championships.

=== 2013–2016: World Cup success, exclusion from national team ===
At the 2013 Women's Cricket World Cup in India, Haynes played several key innings throughout Australia's triumphant campaign. In the team's first match of the tournament, she top-scored with 39 on a bowler-friendly pitch to help post a modest total of 175, leading to a 91-run defeat of Pakistan. Haynes earned Player of the Match honours in the following fixture, scoring 83 off 108 balls against South Africa as Australia chased down a target of 189 with three wickets in hand. She then made 71 not out off 61 deliveries in a comfortable nine-wicket win over Sri Lanka, securing her team's place in the tournament decider. Haynes again made an impact with the bat in the final against the West Indies, scoring 52 off 74 balls with Australia going on to win by 114 runs and be crowned 50-over world champions. She finished the tournament as the fourth-highest run-scorer, compiling 273 at an average of 45.50.

Haynes experienced a drop-off in form during the 2013 Women's Ashes, scoring ten and 23 in a drawn Test at Sir Paul Getty's Ground before making back-to-back ducks in the first two matches of the tour's ODI leg. She staged a fightback late in the first T20I at Chelmsford with Ellyse Perry to form a partnership of 55 runs, but it was not enough to spare the team from a 15-run defeat. In the second T20I on 29 August in Southampton, Haynes faced just two balls and scored three not out. Australia lost the match by five wickets, thus surrendering the Ashes to England. It would take three-and-a-half years to pass before Haynes would make another international cricket appearance.

In the lead-up to the 2013–14 Women's Ashes, Haynes—who had already been selected for the series and was preparing with the squad in Perth—was informed that the size of the touring group would be cut and she was no longer required. She did not receive a national team contract for the 2014–15 season and decided to finish her university degree before finding full-time work. By late 2016, Haynes was considering retirement from cricket. A three-day-per-week job offer from Cricket NSW and a $17,000 state contract raise (due to a team sponsorship increase) combined with the aspiration of having "one last crack at making the Australian team" ahead of the 2017 Women's Cricket World Cup, persuaded Haynes to persist with the sport.

=== 2017: Comeback and captaincy ===
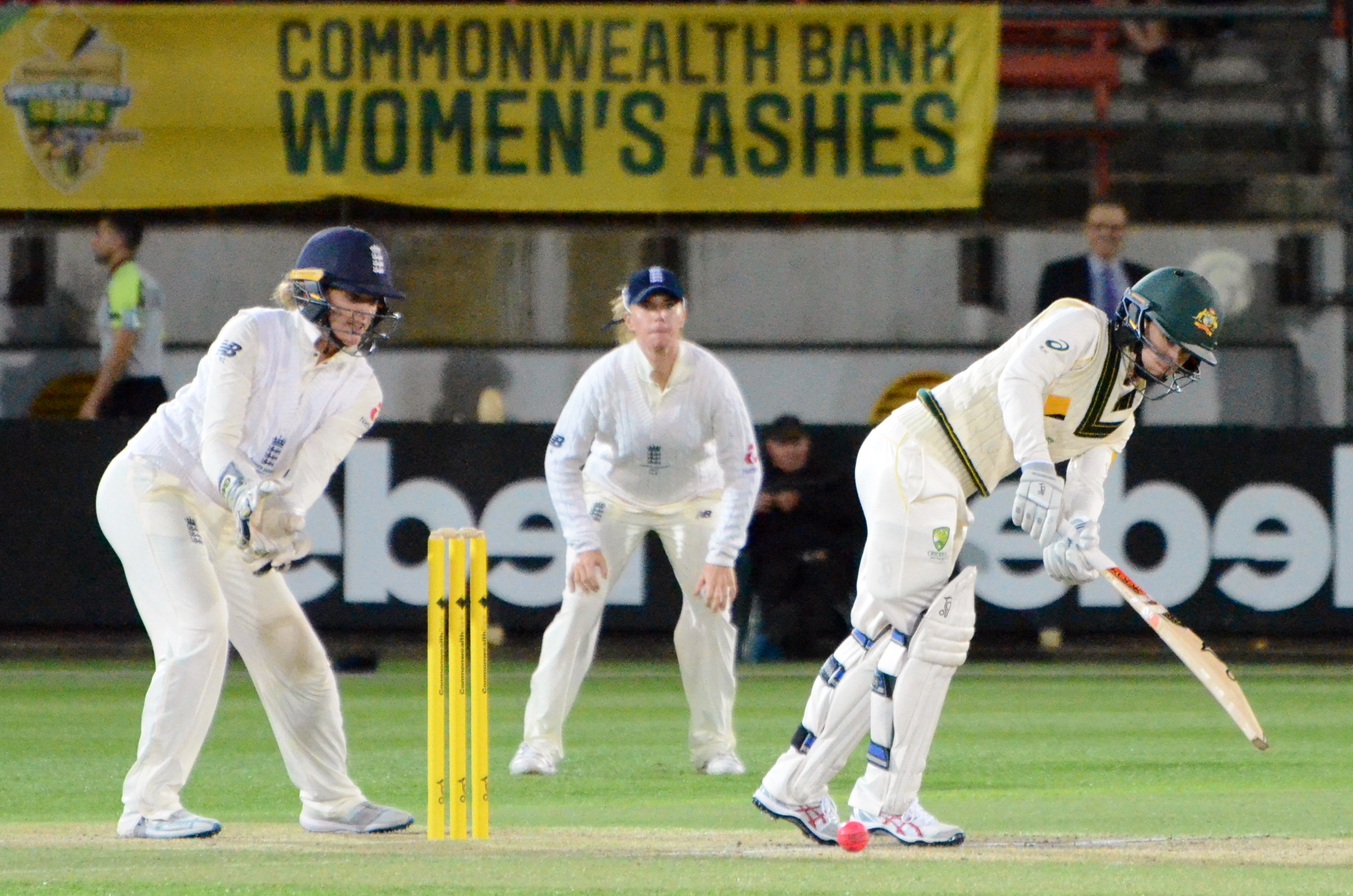
Haynes batting during the 2017–18 Women's Ashes Test match at North Sydney Oval.

Haynes was not initially selected for Australia's tour of New Zealand in early 2017. Rather, she was given a last-minute surprise call-up after injuries to Alex Blackwell and Ellyse Perry presented a long-awaited second chance. On 26 February at Eden Park, in her return to the international stage, Haynes scored 50 runs from 61 balls in an ODI against New Zealand. Despite the match resulting in a five-wicket loss to Australia, and although Haynes would encounter fitness issues of her own days later, selectors deemed she had done enough to earn a national team contract for the 2017–18 season.

Having recovered from a serious ankle injury just in time, Haynes was named in Australia's squad for the 2017 Cricket World Cup in England. Her next official match in Australian colours occurred during a group stage match against Pakistan. With Meg Lanning being carefully managed due to an ongoing shoulder injury, Haynes' stepped into the line-up and also assumed the role of national team captain for the first time. She scored 28 from 47 balls in a convincing 159-run victory. Haynes played one more match in the tournament, serving as captain again, making a duck with the bat but picking up two key top-order wickets with the ball in a 59-run defeat of South Africa. Following Australia's elimination in the semi-finals, Cricket Australia shortly thereafter announced Lanning would be sidelined for six to eight months.

Haynes was named Australia's captain for the 2017–18 Women's Ashes in Lanning's absence—a decision which some commentators described as "strange" and "curious". In the second ODI of the series, at Coffs Harbour International Stadium, she scored 89 not out off just 58 balls to help her team win by 75 runs. Haynes scored twelve not out off ten balls in the first T20I, at North Sydney Oval, which Australia won by six wickets to retain the Ashes.

=== 2018–2019: Fourth world championship, maiden century ===
Upon the return of Meg Lanning and the retirement of Alex Blackwell, the National Selection Panel named Haynes as Australia's new vice-captain ahead of a tour to India in March 2018.

In October 2018, Haynes was named in Australia's squad for the 2018 World Twenty20 tournament in the Caribbean. She provided quickfire unbeaten innings of 29 off 18 balls in a 33-run group stage win against New Zealand and 25 off 15 balls in a 71-run semi-final defeat of the West Indies. Australia defeated England in the final by eight wickets, marking Haynes' third T20 world championship with the team.

During the only Test of the 2019 Women's Ashes, played at Taunton, Haynes formed a 162-run fourth-wicket partnership with Ellyse Perry in the first innings. For the second time in her career, Haynes fell just short of a Test century, this time being dismissed on Australian cricket's superstitious score of 87. Although the match petered out to a draw, Australia convincingly won the series to retain the Ashes.

On 7 October 2019, Haynes recorded her first international century, scoring 118 off 132 balls in a 110-run ODI win against Sri Lanka at Allan Border Field.

=== 2020: Fifth world championship ===
Haynes' most notable performance of the 2020 Women's T20 World Cup occurred in a group stage match against Sri Lanka at the WACA. She scored 60 from 47 balls, forming a 95-run partnership with Meg Lanning to help Australia recover from 3/10 and win by five wickets. Then, in what was effectively a quarter-final against New Zealand at the Junction Oval, she put on a valuable 32-run late-innings stand with Ellyse Perry before her team held on to win by four runs. In the tournament final at the Melbourne Cricket Ground, Australia defeated India by 85 runs, making it Haynes' fourth successful T20 world championship campaign. Having been forced to undertake an untimely drug test, she was infamously absent for a portion of the post-match celebrations which featured the team dancing on stage with Katy Perry.

On 7 October 2020, Haynes once again stepped in as captain for an injured Lanning, leading Australia to a 232-run victory against New Zealand at Allan Border Field. It was the team's 21st consecutive ODI win, equalling the world record set by Ricky Ponting's 2003 Australian men's team. Haynes made scores of 44, 82 and 96 in the 3–0 Rose Bowl sweep to be named Player of the Series.

=== 2021–2022: Sixth world championship, retirement ===
In the only Test of the 2021–22 Women's Ashes, played at Manuka Oval, Haynes combined with Meg Lanning for a 169-run partnership. She was dismissed for 86, marking the third time of her career wherein she would fall just short of a Test century. In the third ODI and final match of England's tour, played at the Junction Oval, Haynes contributed 31 from 46 balls to help set up a successful chase of a modest 164-run target, ensuring Australia would go through the entire series undefeated.

A month later, Haynes made an imposing start to the 2022 Women's Cricket World Cup, scoring 130 against England at Seddon Park in a 12-run victory. She proceeded to score 497 runs throughout the tournament at an average of 62.12, and put on a 160-run opening stand with Alyssa Healy in the final at Hagley Oval, which Australia ended up winning by 71 runs to clinch the championship.

Despite rarely being required to bat during the cricket tournament at the 2022 Commonwealth Games, Haynes played two key innings in the knockout stage. After a guiding hand of 19 runs in a five-wicket semi-final win over New Zealand, she contributed a quickfire 18 not out from ten balls in a nine-run victory against India, helping to secure the gold medal for Australia in what would be the last appearance for her country.

Haynes announced her retirement from all forms of cricket on 15 September 2022, bringing an end to her international career which consisted of 167 matches and 3,818 runs. In tribute, national teammate Jess Jonassen called her "the glue that often held it all together", while ACA chief executive Todd Greenberg stated "Rachael has that great capacity in an athlete to want to make those around them better."

== International centuries ==
Runs	Match	Opponents	City	Venue	Year
118	56	Sri Lanka	Sydney, Australia	North Sydney Oval	2019
130	69	England	Hamilton, New Zealand	Seddon Park	2022

== Coaching ==
In February 2023, Haynes was announced as the head coach of the Gujarat Giants for the inaugural season of the Women's Premier League (WPL) in India.

== Personal life ==
Before receiving a national team contract for the 2017–18 season, Haynes worked in a variety of full-time jobs, including as a Commercial Operations Coordinator for Bowls Australia and as an Account Coordinator at a communications and talent management company in Sydney.

Haynes is often called "Des" or "Dessie" by her teammates, after West Indian opening batsman Desmond Haynes. The surname-sharing pair met and posed for photos during the Australian women's tour of the Caribbean in September 2019.

In April 2017, New South Wales Blues player Steve O'Keefe was fined $20,000 for reportedly making "highly inappropriate" alcohol-fuelled comments to Haynes and her partner at Cricket NSW's end-of-season awards function.

Since moving to Sydney, Haynes has owned a pet cat named Lily. While attempting to break up a fight between her cat and a stray, Haynes was inadvertently bitten on the foot in an "unfortunate feline mishap" which led to an infection, sidelining her for a match during the 2019–20 WBBL season.

Haynes' partner is former Australian and New South Wales cricketer Leah Poulton. The couple welcomed their first child, Hugo Poulton-Haynes, together in October 2021. Haynes is also a cousin of former Australian rules footballer David Haynes.

== Honours ==
=== Team ===
- 2× Women's Cricket World Cup champion: 2013, 2022
- 4× ICC Women's T20 World Cup champion: 2010, 2012, 2018, 2020
- Commonwealth Games champion: 2022
- 7× Women's National Cricket League champion: 2011–12, 2012–13, 2013–14, 2014–15, 2016–17, 2017–18, 2018–19
- 2× Women's Big Bash League champion: 2015–16, 2020–21
- 4× Australian Women's Twenty20 Cup champion: 2009–10, 2010–11, 2012–13, 2014–15

=== Individual ===
- WNCL Player of the Tournament: 2017–18
- WNCL Captains' Most Valuable Player: 2017–18
- 3× WNCL Player of the Final: 2011–12, 2013–14, 2014–15
- Sharon Tredrea Award (Note: Victorian WNCL Player of the season) winner: 2010–11
- Belinda Clark Medal (Note: New South Wales Player of the season) winner: 2020–21
- Alex Blackwell Medal (Note: Sydney Thunder WBBL Most Valuable Player) winner: 2017–18
