= Molly Flaherty =

Australian cricketer (1914–1989)

Personal information
- Full name: Mary Jane Flaherty
- Born: 10 May 1914; Marrickville, New South Wales
- Died: 11 January 1989 (aged 74); Sydney, New South Wales
- Batting: Right-handed
- Bowling: Right-arm fast
- Role: All-rounder

International information
- National side: Australia
- Test debut (cap 18): 12 June 1937 v England
- Last Test: 17 February 1949 v England

Domestic team information
- Years: Team
- 1934/34–1950/51: New South Wales

Career statistics
Competition	Test	First-class
Matches	6	33
Runs scored	54	379
Batting average	10.80	14.03
100s/50s	0/0	0/1
Top score	14*	63
Balls bowled	828	3,605
Wickets	8	106
Bowling average	30.50	12.87
5 wickets in innings	0	4
10 wickets in match	0	0
Best bowling	4/97	5/5
Catches/stumpings	1/–	10/–
- Source: CricketArchive, 9 August 2025

Mary Jane Flaherty (10 May 1914 – 11 January 1989) was an Australian cricket player. Flaherty played six Test matches for the Australia national women's cricket team. She played domestic cricket for the New South Wales women's cricket team as an opening bowler.
