= 2014–15 Women's National Cricket League season =

Cricket tournament

Women's National Cricket League 2014–15 season
- Dates: 11 October 2014 – 25 January 2015
- Administrator: Cricket Australia
- Cricket format: Limited overs cricket (50 overs)
- Tournament format(s): Round-robin and knockout
- Champions: New South Wales (17th title)
- Runners-up: South Australia
- Participants: 7
- Matches: 24
- Player of the series: (Queensland) Jess Jonassen
- Most runs: (Victoria (state)) Meg Lanning (440)
- Most wickets: (South Australia) Amanda-Jade Wellington (12)
- Official website: cricket.com.au

The 2014–15 Women's National Cricket League season was the 19th season of the Women's National Cricket League, the women's domestic limited overs cricket competition in Australia. The tournament started on 11 October 2014 and finished on 25 January 2015. For the second (after 2012–13) and last time, the tournament included semi-finals, with the top four teams on the ladder advancing. New South Wales Breakers won the tournament for the 17th time after finishing only fourth on the ladder and beating South Australian Scorpions in the final. Jess Jonassen was named player of the series in recognition of her fine early season performance, before she was sidelined for the second half of the season by a knee injury.

== Ladder ==
As of 11 January 2015

Pos	Team	Pld	W	L	T	NR	BP	Pts	NRR
1	Victoria	6	5	1	0	0	4	24	1.585
2	Queensland	6	4	2	0	0	5	21	1.119
3	South Australia	6	4	2	0	0	1	17	−0.391
4	New South Wales	6	3	3	0	0	2	14	0.335
5	Australian Capital Territory	6	2	4	0	0	1	9	−0.297
6	Tasmania	6	2	4	0	0	0	8	−1.001
7	Western Australia	6	1	5	0	0	0	4	−1.303

Updated to match(es) played on 11 January 2015. Source:
Rules for classification: The top four ranked teams qualified for the semi-finals.
- Points system: 4 for a win, 2 each for a tie or a no result, 0 for a loss, 1 each for an abandoned match.
- Bonus point system: 2 for win with a run rate twice that of the opposition, 1 for win with a run rate 1.25 times that of the opposition.

== Fixtures ==
=== Round-robin phase ===
Match 1
11 October 2014
Scorecard

Australian Capital Territory	v	New South Wales (home team)

Blacktown Olympic Park Oval, Sydney

Match 2
11 October 2014
Scorecard

(home team) Victoria	v	South Australia

Junction Oval, Melbourne

Match 3
11 October 2014
Scorecard

(home team) Western Australia	v	Queensland

Murdoch University Ground, Perth

Match 4
25 October 2014
Scorecard

Victoria	v	Australian Capital Territory (home team)

Manuka Oval, Canberra

Match 5
25 October 2014
Scorecard

(home team) Queensland	v	New South Wales

Allan Border Field, Brisbane

Match 6
25 October 2014
Scorecard

(home team) Western Australia	v	Tasmania

WACA Ground, Perth

Match 7
29 November 2014
Scorecard

Queensland	v	Tasmania (home team)

Aurora Stadium, Launceston

Match 8
29 November 2014
Scorecard

(home team) Victoria	v	Western Australia

Junction Oval, Melbourne

Match 9
29 November 2014
Scorecard

(home team) South Australia	v	Australian Capital Territory

Adelaide Oval No 2, Adelaide

Match 10
13 December 2014
Scorecard

Victoria	v	Tasmania (home team)

Bellerive Oval, Hobart

Match 11
13 December 2014
Scorecard

(home team) New South Wales	v	Western Australia

Blacktown Olympic Park Oval, Sydney

Match 12
13 December 2014
Scorecard

South Australia	v	Queensland (home team)

Allan Border Field, Brisbane

Match 13
20 December 2014
Scorecard

(home team) Australian Capital Territory	v	Queensland

Manuka Oval, Canberra

Match 14
20 December 2014
Scorecard

Tasmania	v	New South Wales (home team)

Manly Oval, Sydney

Match 15
21 December 2014
Scorecard

South Australia	v	Western Australia (home team)

Murdoch University Ground, Perth

Match 16
1 January 2015
Scorecard

Tasmania	v	South Australia (home team)

Adelaide Oval No 2, Adelaide

Match 17
3 January 2015
Scorecard

Western Australia	v	Australian Capital Territory (home team)

Manuka Oval, Canberra

Match 18
4 January 2015
Scorecard

New South Wales	v	Victoria (home team)

Junction Oval, Melbourne

Match 19
9 January 2015
Scorecard

Australian Capital Territory	v	Tasmania (home team)

Bellerive Oval, Hobart

Match 20
10 January 2015
Scorecard

Victoria	v	Queensland (home team)

Allan Border Field, Brisbane

Match 21
11 January 2015
Scorecard

New South Wales	v	South Australia (home team)

Adelaide Oval No 2, Adelaide

== Knockout stage ==
=== Overview ===
Semifinals
1	Victoria	175
4	New South Wales	3/179
2	Queensland	90
3	South Australia	7/91

Finals
4	New South Wales	4/279
3	South Australia	135

=== Semi-final 1 ===
23 January 2015
Scorecard

Victoria; 175 (49.2 overs)	v	New South Wales; 3/179 (46.3 overs)
Meg Lanning 41 (76); Sarah Coyte 3/33 (9.2 overs)		Alex Blackwell 73 (121); Emma Kearney 1/14 (10 overs)

New South Wales won by 7 wickets (with 21 balls remaining)
Blacktown International Sportspark, Sydney
Umpires: Greg Davidson and Phillip Gillespie
Player of the match: Ellyse Perry (New South Wales)

- Victoria won the toss and elected to bat
- New South Wales qualified for the final

=== Semi-final 2 ===
23 January 2015
Scorecard

Queensland; 90 (28.4 overs)	v	South Australia; 7/91 (30 overs)
Jodie Fields 29 (61); Megan Schutt 4/20 (8.2 overs)		Sarah Taylor 21* (50); Holly Ferling 2/15 (5 overs)

South Australia won by 3 wickets (with 120 balls remaining)
Bankstown Oval, Sydney
Umpires: Damien Mealey and Tony Wilds
Player of the match: Megan Schutt (South Australia)

- Queensland won the toss and elected to bat
- South Australia qualified for the final

=== Final ===
25 January 2015
Scorecard

New South Wales; 4/279 (50 overs)	v	South Australia; 135 (44.5 overs)
Rachael Haynes 79 (89); Samantha Betts 2/44 (7 overs)		Bridget Patterson 26 (58); Erin Osborne 3/33 (7.5 overs)

New South Wales won by 144 runs
Blacktown International Sportspark, Sydney
Umpires: Damien Mealey and Greg Davidson
Player of the match: Rachael Haynes (New South Wales)

- South Australia won the toss and elected to field.
- New South Wales won the 2014–15 Women's National Cricket League.

== Statistics ==
=== Highest totals ===
Team	Score	Against	Venue	Date
Victoria	2/357	Tasmania	Bellerive Oval, Hobart	13 December 2014
Victoria	3/299	South Australia	Junction Oval, Melbourne	11 October 2014
New South Wales	4/299	Western Australia	Blacktown International Sportspark, Sydney	13 December 2014
New South Wales	4/279	South Australia	Blacktown International Sportspark, Sydney	25 January 2015
Victoria	7/262	Western Australia	Junction Oval, Melbourne	29 November 2014

=== Most runs ===
Player	Team	Mat	Inns	NO	Runs	HS	Ave	BF	SR	100	50
Meg Lanning	Victoria	7	7	0	440	125	62.85	494	89.06	2	2
Nicole Bolton	Victoria	7	7	2	400	170*	80.00	522	76.62	2	0
Alex Blackwell	New South Wales	8	8	1	371	81	53.00	511	72.60	0	3
Alyssa Healy	New South Wales	8	8	0	335	146	41.87	404	82.92	1	1
Rachael Haynes	New South Wales	7	7	0	327	115	46.71	358	91.34	1	2

=== Most wickets ===
Player	Team	Mat	Inns	Overs	Mdns	Runs	Wkts	BBI	Ave	SR	4WI
Amanda-Jade Wellington	South Australia	8	8	62.0	5	300	12	6/25	25.00	31.0	1
Jess Jonassen	Queensland	5	5	49.4	6	147	11	4/19	13.36	27.0	1
Alex Price	South Australia	8	8	60.3	8	226	11	3/37	20.54	33.0	0
Grace Harris	Queensland	7	7	35.3	3	158	10	4/20	15.80	21.3	1
Megan Schutt	South Australia	7	7	55.4	5	180	10	4/20	18.00	33.4	1
