= Victoria Lind =

New Zealand cricketer (born 1985)

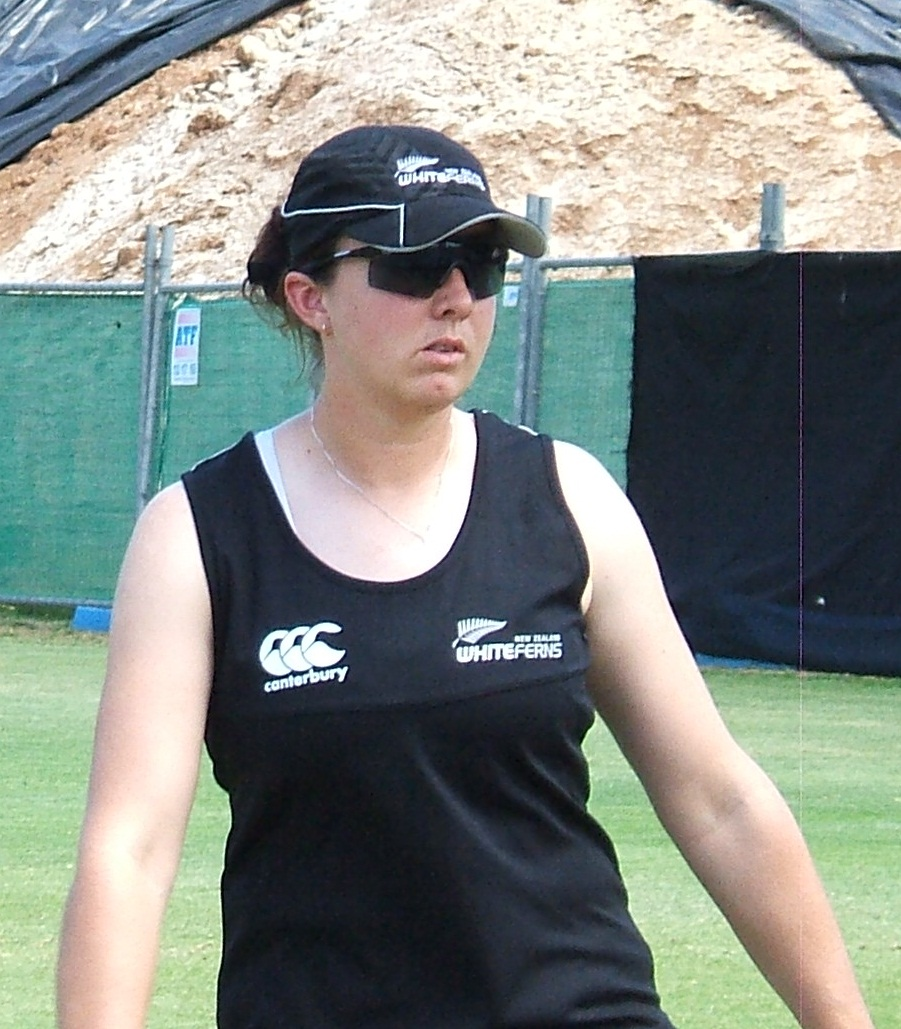

Personal information
- Full name: Victoria Jayne Lind
- Born: 15 May 1985 (age 41); Auckland, New Zealand
- Batting: Right-handed
- Role: Wicket-keeper

International information
- National side: New Zealand (2009–2010)
- ODI debut (cap 113): 10 February 2010 v Australia
- Last ODI: 7 March 2010 v Australia
- T20I debut (cap 27): 1 June 2009 v Australia
- Last T20I: 3 June 2009 v Australia

Domestic team information
- Years: Team
- 2003/04–2016/17: Auckland
- 2007: Berkshire

Career statistics
| Competition | WODI | WT20I | WLA | WT20 |
|---|---|---|---|---|
| Matches | 8 | 2 | 134 | 58 |
| Runs scored | 178 | 29 | 2,887 | 869 |
| Batting average | 22.25 | 14.50 | 26.73 | 17.38 |
| 100s/50s | 0/1 | 0/0 | 0/16 | 0/3 |
| Top score | 68 | 20 | 91 | 78 |
| Catches/stumpings | 5/0 | 0/– | 71/17 | 21/22 |
- Source: CricketArchive, 9 April 2021

Victoria Jayne Lind (born 15 May 1985) is a New Zealand former cricketer who played as a wicket-keeper and right-handed batter. She appeared in 8 One Day Internationals and 2 Twenty20 Internationals for New Zealand in 2009 and 2010. She played domestic cricket for Auckland, as well as spending one season with Berkshire.
