= Rene Farrell =

Australian cricketer

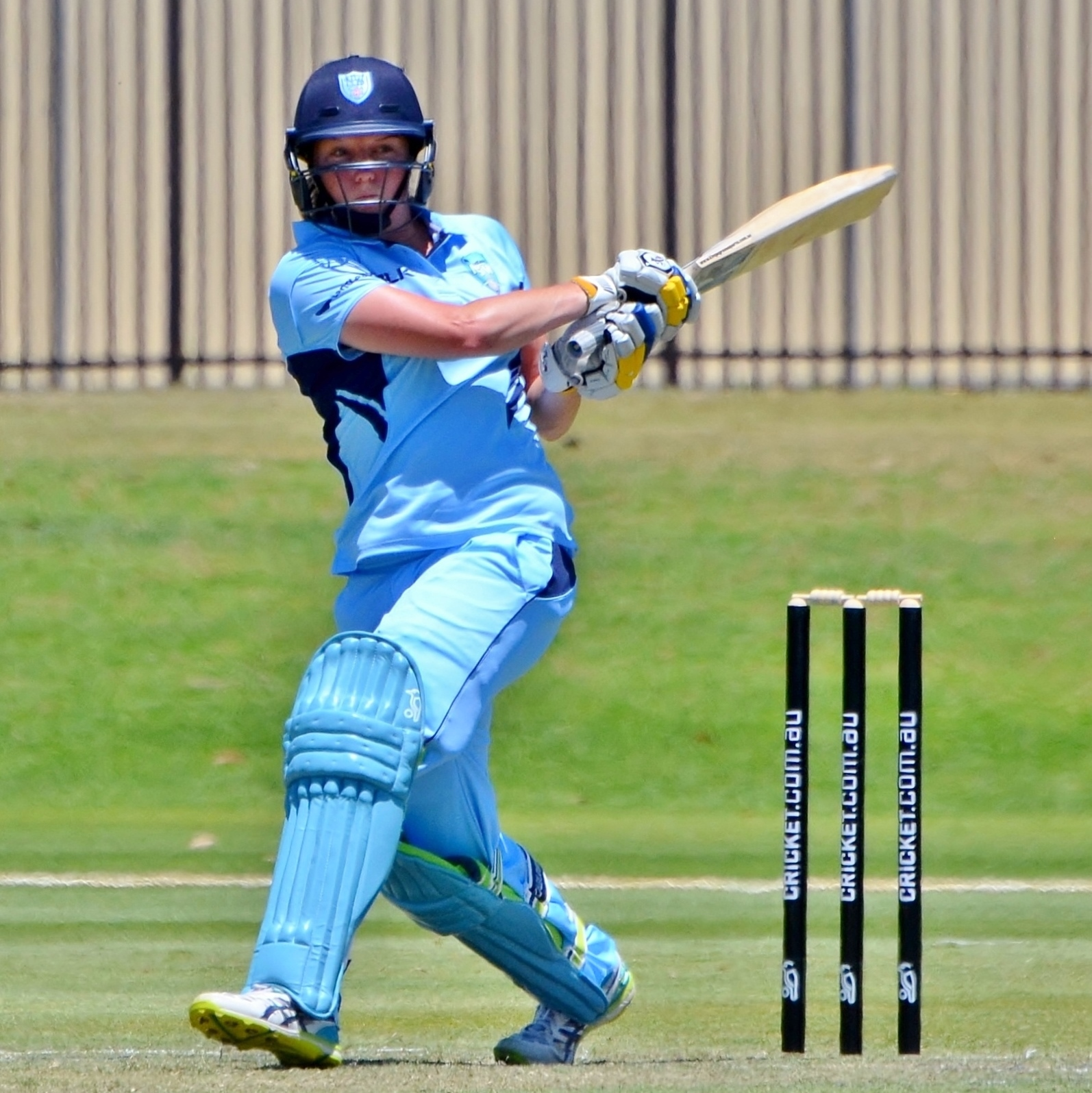
- Farrell batting for NSW Breakers, 2017

Personal information
- Full name: Rene Michelle Farrell
- Born: 13 January 1987 (age 39); Kogarah, New South Wales, Australia
- Batting: Right-handed
- Bowling: Right-arm medium
- Role: Bowler

International information
- National side: Australia
- Test debut (cap 156): 10 July 2009 v England
- Last Test: 10 January 2014 v England
- ODI debut (cap 110): 28 July 2007 v New Zealand
- Last ODI: 27 November 2016 v South Africa
- ODI shirt no.: 13
- T20I debut (cap 26): 1 June 2009 v New Zealand
- Last T20I: 27 September 2016 v Sri Lanka
- T20I shirt no.: 13

Domestic team information
- Years: Team
- 2006–2008: New South Wales
- 2008–2010: Western Australia
- 2009: Nottinghamshire
- 2012–2014: ACT Meteors
- 2014–present: New South Wales
- 2015–2019: Sydney Thunder
- 2016: Surrey Stars

Career statistics
Competition	WTest	WODI	WT20I
Matches	3	44	54
Runs scored	31	182	95
Batting average	7.75	18.20	11.87
100s/50s	0/0	0/0	0/0
Top score	11	39*	31*
Balls bowled	637	1,869	1,113
Wickets	17	42	55
Bowling average	9.88	30.78	20.90
5 wickets in innings	1	0	0
10 wickets in match	0	0	0
Best bowling	5/23	3/17	4/15
Catches/stumpings	0/–	9/–	9/–
- Source: CricketArchive, 28 April 2021

Rene Farrell (born 13 January 1987) is an Australian cricketer. A fast-medium pace bowler, she has been a current member of the Australian team. On 1 December 2019, Farrell announced her retirement from Women's Big Bash League.

Although Farrell was successful in age-group interstate cricket, she did not make her senior debut for New South Wales until late in the 2006–07 season a month before turning 20. Her state made the finals series, and in the first match she took 3/27 and was unbeaten on one as they took a one-wicket victory—the closest possible result in a winning run-chase. New South Wales went on to claim the title, and Farrell was then selected for the national team to play New Zealand in the Rose Bowl series after only five matches—half a season of senior domestic cricket. Making her debut in the fourth of five matches, Farrell took 3/36 to help Australia seal the series. However, her rapid rise came to a halt during the 2007–08 season. She took only eight wickets in the WNCL season and was dropped from the national team, missing three bilateral series for Australia before the start of the following summer. Farrell transferred to Western Australia and while taking nine wickets, she also made 172 runs at a batting average of 34.40, a figure comparable to those of specialist batsmen, earning herself a recall to the Australian team. She took 3/26 against New Zealand in her first match back and played in six of Australia's seven matches at the 2009 World Cup, totalling seven wickets. After taking five wickets in three Twenty20 matches against New Zealand before departing for the 2009 Twenty20 in England, Farrell played in all of Australia's four matches despite taking only one wicket at an economy rate of 8.92, and was sometimes used as a pinch-hitter to score quick runs.

During the bilateral series that followed against the hosts, Farrell made her Test debut, taking a total of 3/36, but she managed only one wicket in five ODIs. Afterwards, she stayed in England for a stint with Nottinghamshire and hit two centuries to end with 413 runs at 59.00. Returning to Australia for the 2009–10, she had her most prolific WNCL campaign, scoring 171 runs and taking 18 wickets, including her first five-wicket haul. Farrell played in the Rose Bowl series afterwards, and after taking one wicket in each of the five ODIs in Australia, was dropped for three fixtures in New Zealand.

== Early career ==
In March 2002, Farrell was selected for New South Wales to play in the Under-17 interstate championships. She scored 26 runs at a batting average of 26.00 and took six wickets at a bowling average of 16.66. New South Wales won every match up until the final, where they collapsed for 60 to lose to Queensland. In January 2003, Farrell was selected for the Under-19 team and played in five matches. Her best performance was to score 49 and take 4/14 in a 123-run win over Tasmania. She took only one more wicket to end with five at 19.00 and scored 103 runs at 25.75. Farrell returned the following year and took 4/1 from three overs in the first match as New South Wales defeated Tasmania by ten wickets after dismissing them for 24. She then took 4/19 against Western Australia and ended with 11 wickets at 9.54 and scored 62 runs at 31.00 in two matches.

== Domestic debut ==
Despite the strong performances in her final year in age group state cricket, Farrell was unable to break into senior ranks until late in the 2006–07 season. She made her debut for New South Wales in a closely contested match against Western Australia, the sixth of eight qualifying matches in the Women's National Cricket League (WNCL). After taking 1/19 from her six overs, she came to the crease in the closing stages of the match as New South Wales' tail struggled to reach the target of 134. Farrell was run out for two, but her state held their nerve to scrape home by two wickets. She was omitted for the penultimate match of the season before taking 0/13 from four overs in an eight-wicket win over South Australia. New South Wales, the defending champions placed second and qualified for the finals series hosted by Victoria. Farrell retained her position in the team and was a key player in the first match, taking 3/27 from her ten overs as the hosts were dismissed for 136. New South Wales struggled and Farrell came to the crease and scored one not out and was present when the winning runs were scored, sealing a one-wicket win. The rest of the series was not so dramatic. Farrell took one wicket in each of the two remaining matches; Victoria won the first by eight wickets and New South Wales won the deciding game by three wickets to retain their title. Farrell was not required to bat in this last match and ended the season with 3 runs at 1.50 and six wickets at 21.16.

Farrell was rewarded at the end of the season with selection in the Australia Youth team to play against New Zealand A. She took a wicket in each of her two matches and ended with two wickets at 31.00 and 36 runs at 18.00.

== International debut ==
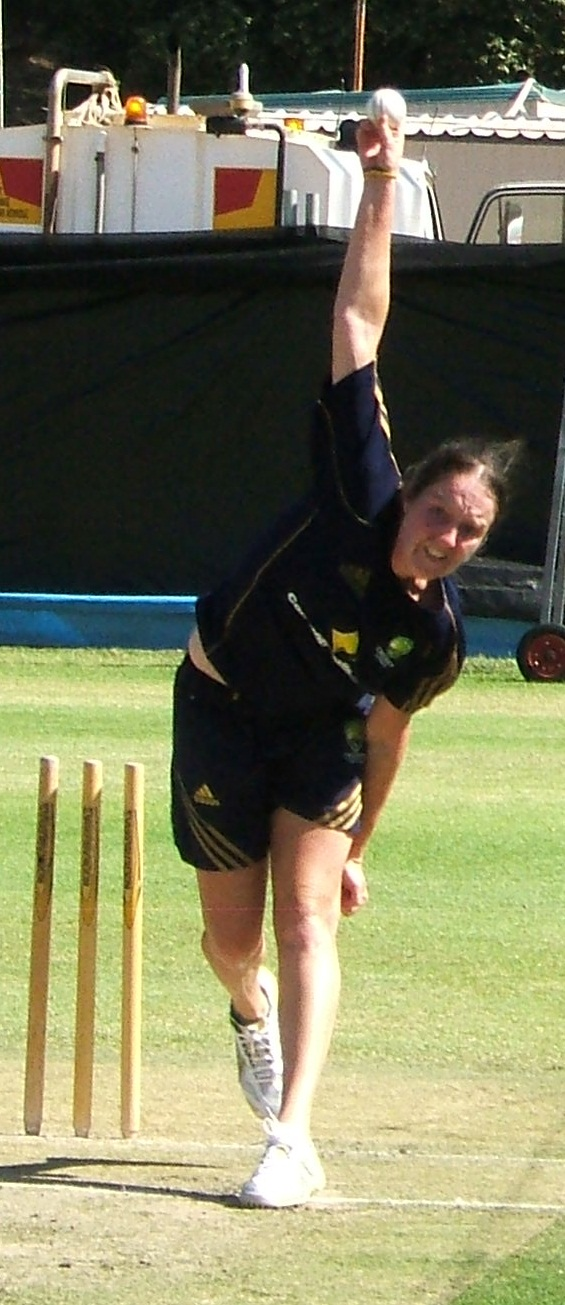
Farrell about to deliver a ball in the nets.

During July in the Australian winter of 2007, a Rose Bowl series was held against New Zealand in the tropical northern city of Darwin. Farrell was selected for the senior national squad after only five senior domestic matches, as cover for the injured pair of Lisa Sthalekar and Clea Smith.

After Australia had taken a 2–1 lead in the five-match series, Farrell was given her debut in the fourth match. She took 3/36 from nine overs, taking three middle-order wickets. She also completed a catch to help restrict the tourists to 9/196. Australia found the target difficult and won by three wickets and seal the series, sparing Farrell the need to bat on her debut. In the final match, Farrell batted for the first time, scoring three not out. She took 1/23 from five overs as New Zealand won by four wickets.

Farrell had her first full WNCL season in 2007–08, playing in all eight of New South Wales' matches. After taking only one wicket in the first four matches, she took six wickets in the last four round-robin matches, with best figures of 2/9 against Queensland. New South Wales won all but their final match to qualify first and host the final against South Australia. Persistent rain forced the abandonment of the match and New South Wales retained their title on account of placing first in the round-robin phase. Farrell took eight wickets at 19.25 at the high economy rate of 4.52 and scored 16 runs at 8.00. In two Twenty20 matches, she took three wickets at 8.66 at and economy rate of 5.20 and was not required to bat as New South Wales won both games.

Farrell was dropped from the Australian team after these performances in the WNCL and missed the home series against England and the Rose Bowl in New Zealand at the end of the season. Instead, she played for Australia's Under-21 team in three matches against England and the senior Australian team ahead of their international series. Farrell took five wickets at 17.00 at an economy rate of 4.20 and scored 33 runs at 33.00. In the first match against England, she took 3/22 in a 52-run win, and in the second match she scored an unbeaten 30 as the Australian Under-21s were dismissed for 174 to cede a 75-run loss.

At the start of the 2008–09 season, Farrell was also left out of the home series against India. For the new WNCL season Farrell moved to Western Australia, and her batting improved markedly after her transfer. In her first match for her new state, Farrell hit an unbeaten 29 to steer them to a four-wicket win over South Australia. In the penultimate match of the season, she hit an unbeaten 59 in a tied match against Queensland. Farrell ended the season with 172 runs at 34.40 from eight matches, an average superior to many specialist batsmen. Her bowling remained steady, never taking more than two wickets in a match. She ended the WNCL with nine wickets at 27.33 at an economy rate of 3.48. Western Australia won only two of their eight matches and did not make the final. In two T20 matches, Farrell scored 21 in her only innings and took one wicket at 40.00 at an economy rate of 8.00.

== 2009 World Cup and World Twenty20 ==
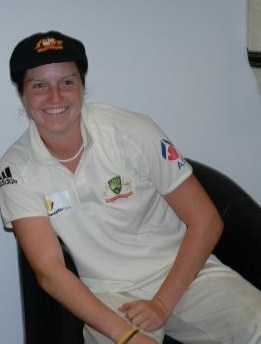
Farrell in July 2009

Farrell was recalled to the Australian team for the Rose Bowl series in New Zealand in February and the 2009 World Cup held in New South Wales and Canberra the following month. Farrell played in the first and third matches against New Zealand, taking 3/26 in the first match as the hosts scraped home by two wickets. She was expensive in the next match, taking 1/35 from five overs in a heavy defeat, ending the series with 20 runs at 20.00 and four wickets at 15.25 and an economy rate of 4.69.

In two warm-up matches ahead of the World Cup, Farrell had mixed results. She made 15 not out but was hit for 37 runs in six wicketless overs against England. In the next match against Sri Lanka, she scored 23 and took 1/12 in a comfortable 230-run win.

Farrell was retained for the opening match against New Zealand, taking 1/20. She did not bat as Australia failed in their run-chase. In the next match against South Africa, she took 2/30 from 6.3 overs as Australia won by 61 runs, and omitted for the last group match against the West Indies, a 47-run win as the hosts reached the next round. In the first Super Six match, Farrell took 1/30 from 10 overs and made 20 not out, attempting to engineer the end of the run-chase as Australia fell 16 runs short of India's 5/234. She then took 2/23 against Pakistan in a 107-run win. By this time, Australia's two losses had already made it impossible to make the final. Farrell took 1/15 from six overs in the final super Six match against England, which Australia won, and they met India in the third-place playoff. Farrell was bowled by Jhulan Goswami for nine and took 0/17 from four wickets at the hosts lost by three wickets to finish fourth. She ended with seven wickets at 19.42.

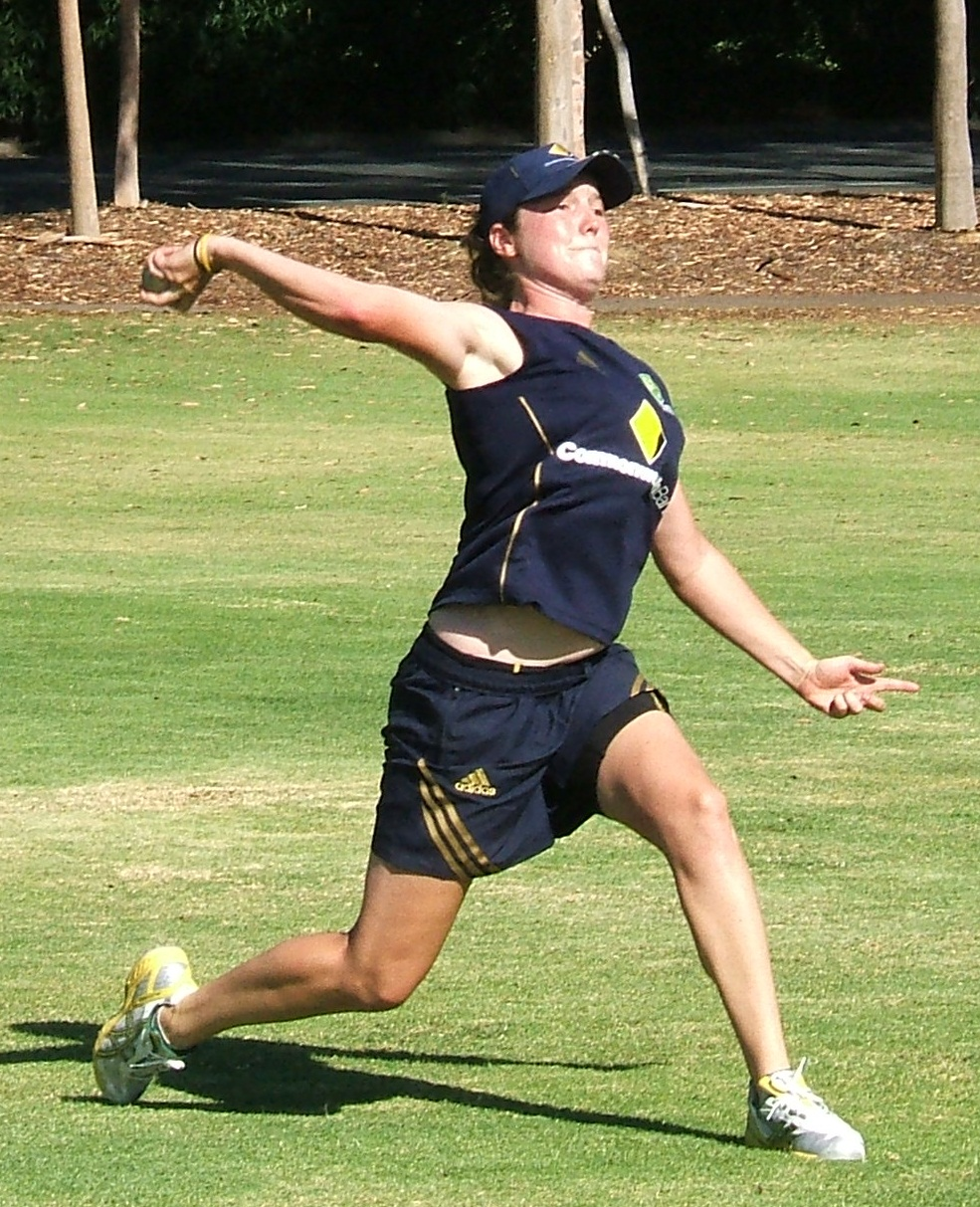
Farrell about to throw a ball during fielding practice.

Farrell was selected for Australia's team for the inaugural Women's World Twenty20 held in England in 2009. The Australians hosted New Zealand for a three-match series in tropical Darwin at the beginning of June before the World Cup, and Farrell showed good form taking five wickets at 9.80 at an economy rate of only 4.45, with a best of 3/13 from four overs in the first match. However, she could not maintain the form. She took 1/29 from four overs in the team's only warm-up on English soil, against the hosts, and was retained for all the matches, despite going wicketless in each of the three group matches and conceding 84 runs at an economy rate of 9.33. However, she was effective with the bat, scoring 13, 31 and 12, all unbeaten, against New Zealand, West Indies and South Africa respectively, the second innings coming when she was promoted up the order in an eight-wicket win. Australia lost to New Zealand but won the last two matches to reach the semi-finals. There she scored one not out before England overhauled Australia's score of 5/163 to reach the final, which they won. Farrell was again ineffective, taking 1/32 from four overs. She ended the tournament with one wicket at 116.00 at an economy rate of 8.92.

Farrell and the Australians stayed in England for a bilateral series against the hosts, who were the reigning world champions in both ODIs and T20s, after the end of the World Twenty20. She took 2/16 from her four overs as Australia upset England in the only T20 by 34 runs. She played in all of the five ODIs, scoring 39 not out as Australia collapsed to be all out for 133. Farrell ended the series with 70 runs at 35.00 and again struggled with the ball taking one wicket at 119.00 at an economy rate of 4.40.

England won all the ODI matches except the last, which was washed out. Farrell made her Test debut against England in a one-off match at County Road in Worcestershire. Batting at No. 10, she scored 8 in Australia's 309, bowled by Nicki Shaw. Opening the bowling, Farrell trapped Caroline Atkins for two in the third over of the innings to claim her maiden Test wicket, and then removed the other opener Lydia Greenway for five to leave England at 2/11. She later bowled English paceman Katherine Brunt to end a 46-run seventh-wicket partnership at 7/183. Farrell ended with 3/32 from an economical display of 30 overs to help Australia dismiss England for 268 and take a 41-run lead. She then made 4 as Australia set the hosts a target of 273 before the match was drawn. She took 0/4 from seven overs in the second innings, six of which were maidens, meaning that she had conceded less than one run per over throughout the match.

== County stint in England ==
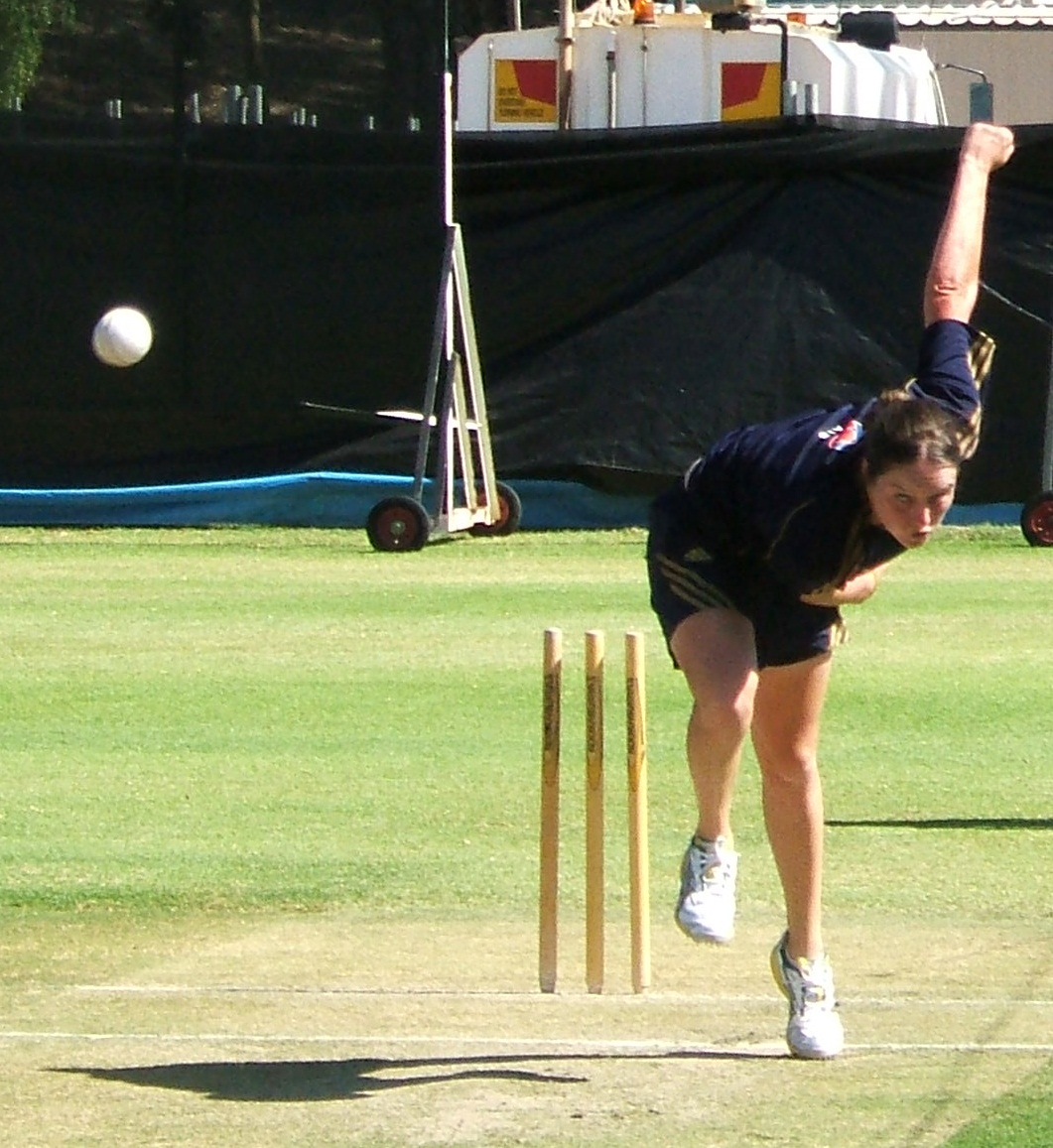
Farrell follows through after delivering a ball in the nets.

At the end of the tour of England, Farrell stayed on for a period to play for Nottinghamshire. During this stint she was successful mainly as a batsman. Before making her debut for the county, she struck 123 for Ransome & Marles against Warrington. In her debut for Nottinghamshire in the one-day competition, Farrell scored 129, contributing more than 70% of her team's 179 as wickets fell around her regularly. She took 1/20 from her 10 overs but it was not enough to prevent a six-wicket defeat at the hands of Sussex. In her third match, she took 4/20 and scored 26 in a six-wicket win over Somerset. In the next match, she was attacked by the Kent batsmen, taking 1/69 from 10 overs. She responded by scoring 122 herself, but Nottinghamshire fell 15 runs short of Kent's 6/256. In her seventh and final match for the county, she hit 80 in a 23-run win over Surrey. In total, Farrell scored 413 runs at 59.00 and took seven wickets at 25.28 at an economy rate of 3.21.

The WNCL was expanded in 2009–10 with the addition of the ACT, so ten round-robin matches were scheduled, and Farrell played in all, scoring 171 runs at 17.10. Her top-score of 52 came in a 127-run defeat at the hands of New South Wales. She also had her most prolific season with the ball taking 18 wickets at 21.44 and an economy rate of 4.42. After taking four wickets in the first four matches, she took 3/32 and 2/33 against the Australian Capital Territory, but then wen wicketless in two matches against her native state, conceding almost five runs per over in heavy defeats by 127 runs and ten wickets. In the last two matches of the season, Farrell's performance peaked. She took 5/57 from her ten overs and completed three catches to help bowl out Queensland for 213, setting up a three-wicket win, and the next day, she took 4/27 and a catch to help seal a 138-run win. Western Australia won only four of their ten matches and did not make the final.

Farrell had a successful time in the domestic T20s, now part of a full interstate tournament, scoring 99 runs at 19.80 and taking five wickets at 19.00 at an economy rate of 4.75. Her best score of 38 came in a win over the Australian Capital Territory and her best bowling of 3/11 came against Tasmania. Western Australia did not make the final.

In the 2010 Rose Bowl series, Farrell played in each of the five ODIs during the Australian leg of the competition. She took one wicket in each of the matches and made ducks in both of her innings. She ended the ODIs with five wickets at 21.60 and an economy rate of 3.25 as Australia won all five matches. The ODIs were followed by five T20 internationals, three at Bellerive Oval in Hobart and the last two in New Zealand. Farrell played in all but the fourth T20 game, taking five wickets at 17.80 and an economy rate of 6.35 and she batted twice, scoring two runs at 2.00. New Zealand won all five T20s and Farrell was left out of the three ODIs on New Zealand soil.

== 2010 World Twenty20 triumph ==
Farrell was selected for the 2010 World Twenty20 in the West Indies and played in every match of Australia's unbeaten campaign. In the first warm-up match, she bowled two overs late in the innings, taking 0/15, and did not bat as Australia lost to New Zealand by 18 runs. In the last warm-up match, she was again not required to bat and took 2/16 in a three-over spell at the start of the innings, removing Nain Abidi and Bismah Maroof as the Australians defeated Pakistan by 82 runs.

Australia were grouped with England, South Africa and the West Indies. In the first match against England, Farrell caught top-scorer Sarah Taylor from the bowling of Sthalekar and then caught and bowled Lydia Greenway for 14 as England collapsed from 3/75 to be 104 all out with 15 balls unused. In pursuit of 105 for victory, Australia were in difficulty when Farrell came to the crease to join Sthalekar with the score at 8/86 after 16.3 overs. Australia still needed 18 runs from 21 balls. The pair put on 11 from 14 balls before Sthalekar fell with seven balls remaining, bringing last batsman Clea Smith in. Seven runs were needed from the final over and English captain Charlotte Edwards brought herself on to bowl. Farrell hit a four off the first ball, and scored two off the third ball, tying the scores. However, she then panicked and was run out for 13 from 13 balls by Beth Morgan while going for the winning run from the next ball, leaving the scores tied.

A Super Over eventuated, and Laura Marsh bowled for England. A strong hitter, Farrell was sent in with Leah Poulton. Farrell scored two runs from two balls, hitting a single from each delivery she faced. Poulton fell on the fourth ball and Alyssa Healy was run out on the sixth and final ball of Australia's Super Over while attempting a second run, leaving them at 2/6. England also ended with 2/6 after a run out in an attempt to secure the winning run on the final ball. Australia was awarded the match because they had hit more sixes in the match—Jess Cameron scored the solitary six.

In the next match against South Africa, Farrell came in at 7/151. She lasted two balls before being run out for one late in the innings. Her dismissal was part of a sudden collapse as Australia lost 6/16 including the last four wickets for four runs to be all out for 155 with three balls unused. She took 0/20 from her four overs and caught Dane van Niekerk from the last ball of the match as Australia completed a 22-run win. In the final group match against the hosts, Farrell was promoted up the order came in at 4/78 in the 12th over with the intention of lifting the run rate, but made only 5 from 6 balls before being dismissed before Australia finished on 7/133. She combined with Ellyse Perry to run out Juliana Nero in the second over, before bowling Cordel Jack for a duck in the next over to reduce the hosts to 2/16. She ended with 1/25 from her four overs as Australia won by nine runs to finish the group stage unbeaten at the top of their quartet.

Australia went on to face India in the semi-final. Farrell removed Indian batsman Sulakshana Naik from the third ball of the match and ended with 1/22 from her four overs. She was not required to bat as Australia reached their target of 120 with seven wickets and seven balls to spare.

Australia batted first in the final against New Zealand and had their least prolific batting display of the tournament. Farrell came in at 7/99 with seven balls remaining in the innings. She made three runs from four balls. The innings ended with a one-handed catch by New Zealand captain Aimee Watkins, who leapt high at cover to catch and prevent a drive from Farrell going for four. In a low-scoring match, Farrell was the most expensive of the Australian bowlers. Her first over, the second of the innings saw a six from Suzie Bates over long-on, and Farrell was taken out of the attack. New Zealand then began losing wickets and were in trouble at 4/29 in the eighth over. Australia were in the ascendancy for most of the run-chase and New Zealand needed 24 runs from the last 8 balls, but Sophie Devine hit a four and a six from the last two balls of the 19th over bowled by Farrell to leave New Zealand requiring 14 runs from the last over. However, they managed only 10 and Australia won by three runs.

== 2015 Ashes ==
In June 2015, she was named as one of Australia's touring party for the 2015 Women's Ashes in England.
