= 2005 Super Fours =

Cricket championship

- Administrator(s): England and Wales Cricket Board
- Cricket format: 50 over
- Tournament format(s): League system
- Champions: Knight Riders (2nd title)
- Participants: 4
- Matches: 12
- Most runs: Charlotte Edwards, Knight Riders (428)
- Most wickets: Laura Newton, V Team (13)

The 2005 Super Fours was the fourth cricket Super Fours season. It took place in June and July and saw 4 teams compete in a 50 over league and a Twenty20 league. Knight Riders won the 50 over league, achieving their second title, whilst V Team won the Twenty20 league, also achieving their second title in the format, and their second in two years.

== Competition format ==
In the one day tournament, teams played each other twice in a round-robin format, with the winners of the group winning the tournament. Matches were played using a one day format with 50 overs per side.

The group worked on a points system with positions within the divisions being based on the total points. Points were awarded as follows:

Win: 15 points.

Tie: 6 points.

Loss: 0 points.

The Twenty20 competition was expanded from the 2004 edition of the Super Fours: in 2005, each team played each other once in a round-robin format, with the winners of the group winning the tournament. 2 points were awarded for a win.

== Teams ==
| Braves | Knight Riders | Super Strikers | V Team |
|---|---|---|---|
| (England) Clare Connor (c); (England) Colleen Ashbee; (England) Caroline Atkins; (England) Katie Berry; (England) Rosalie Birch; (England) Holly Colvin; (England) Steph Davies; (England) Leanne Davis; (England) Jenny Dunn; (England) Jackie Hawker; (England) Natalie Lane; (England) Sara Lord; (England) Laura Marsh; (England) Kate Oakenfold; (England) Anya Shrubsole; (England) Anna Spragg (wk); (England) Clare Taylor; (England) Kirstie White (wk) | (England) Charlotte Edwards (c); (England) Lynsey Askew; (England) Laura Boorman; (England) Hannah Burr; (England) Georgia Elwiss; (England) Lydia Greenway; (England) Isa Guha; (England) Laura Joyce (wk); (England) Hannah Lloyd; (England) Beth Morgan; (England) Bev Nicholson; (England) Mandy Raynham; (England) Susie Rowe; (England) Juliet Tetley; (England) Jo Watts; (England) Beth Wild | (England) Arran Brindle (c); (England) Kelly Evenson; (England) Jenny Gunn; (England) Laura Harper; (England) Charlotte Horton; (England) Nicky Myers; (England) Gill Richards; (England) Nicky Shaw; (England) Jane Smit (wk); (England) Lynne Spooner; (England) Sarah Taylor (wk); (England) Jasmine Titmuss; (England) Alexia Walker | (England) Laura Newton (c); (England) Salliann Briggs; (England) Katherine Brunt; (England) Sarah Collyer; (England) Kathryn Doherty; (England) Jenny Dunn; (England) Georgia Elwiss; (England) Mandie Godliman (wk); (England) Kathryn Hayes; (England) Danielle Hazell; (England) Alexis Mannion; (England) Dawn Prestidge; (England) Robyn Still; (England) Claire Taylor (wk) |

== 50 over ==
=== Results ===
| Team | Pld | W | L | T | A | Pts |
|---|---|---|---|---|---|---|
| Knight Riders (C) | 6 | 4 | 1 | 1 | 0 | 66 |
| Super Strikers | 6 | 4 | 2 | 0 | 0 | 60 |
| V Team | 6 | 2 | 3 | 1 | 0 | 36 |
| Braves | 6 | 1 | 5 | 0 | 0 | 15 |

Source: Cricket Archive

| 4 June | Braves; 143/8 (50 overs) | v | Knight Riders; 210/3 (50 overs) | Knight Riders won by 67 runs |
| Scorecard | Braves; 143/8 (50 overs) | v | Knight Riders; 210/3 (50 overs) | Stowe School Ground, Stowe; Umpires: Graham Cooper and Steven Garratt |
| Scorecard | Anna Spragg 32* (72); Lynsey Askew 3/16 (10 overs) | | Charlotte Edwards 84 (118); Laura Marsh 1/27 (10 overs) | Stowe School Ground, Stowe; Umpires: Graham Cooper and Steven Garratt |
| Braves won the toss and elected to field.; Points: Knight Riders 15, Braves 0 | | | | Stowe School Ground, Stowe; Umpires: Graham Cooper and Steven Garratt |

| 4 June | Super Strikers; 203/7 (50 overs) | v | V Team; 181 (49 overs) | Super Strikers won by 22 runs |
| Scorecard | Super Strikers; 203/7 (50 overs) | v | V Team; 181 (49 overs) | Stowe School Ground, Stowe; Umpires: Jon Hayes and Richard Illingworth |
| Scorecard | Laura Harper 57 (70); Georgia Elwiss 2/44 (9 overs) | | Katherine Brunt 43 (49); Arran Brindle 3/34 (10 overs) | Stowe School Ground, Stowe; Umpires: Jon Hayes and Richard Illingworth |
| V Team won the toss and elected to field.; Points: Super Strikers 15, V Team 0 | | | | Stowe School Ground, Stowe; Umpires: Jon Hayes and Richard Illingworth |

| 5 June | Braves; 130/9 (50 overs) | v | Super Strikers; 131/1 (36.5 overs) | Super Strikers won by 9 wickets |
| Scorecard | Braves; 130/9 (50 overs) | v | Super Strikers; 131/1 (36.5 overs) | Stowe School Ground, Stowe; Umpires: Graham Cooper and Steven Garratt |
| Scorecard | Jenny Dunn 25 (58); Arran Brindle 3/14 (10 overs) | | Arran Brindle 62* (111); Clare Connor 1/15 (10 overs) | Stowe School Ground, Stowe; Umpires: Graham Cooper and Steven Garratt |
| Braves won the toss and elected to bat.; Points: Super Strikers 15, Braves 0 | | | | Stowe School Ground, Stowe; Umpires: Graham Cooper and Steven Garratt |

| 5 June | Knight Riders; 201 (46.1 overs) | v | V Team; 180 (49.2 overs) | Knight Riders won by 21 runs |
| Scorecard | Knight Riders; 201 (46.1 overs) | v | V Team; 180 (49.2 overs) | Stowe School Ground, Stowe; Umpires: John Hayes and Richard Illingworth |
| Scorecard | Charlotte Edwards 93 (120); Laura Newton 4/39 (10 overs) | | Laura Newton 39 (72); Charlotte Edwards 5/31 (7.2 overs) | Stowe School Ground, Stowe; Umpires: John Hayes and Richard Illingworth |
| V Team won the toss and elected to field.; Points: Knight Riders 15, V Team 0 | | | | Stowe School Ground, Stowe; Umpires: John Hayes and Richard Illingworth |

| 18 June | Braves; 237/9 (50 overs) | v | V Team; 229 (49.5 overs) | Braves won by 8 runs |
| Scorecard | Braves; 237/9 (50 overs) | v | V Team; 229 (49.5 overs) | Kent County Cricket Ground, Beckenham; Umpires: Neil Bainton and Lorraine Elgar |
| Scorecard | Natalie Lane 55 (59); Kathryn Doherty 3/43 (8 overs) | | Claire Taylor 70 (72); Clare Connor 3/37 (9.5 overs) | Kent County Cricket Ground, Beckenham; Umpires: Neil Bainton and Lorraine Elgar |
| Braves won the toss and elected to bat.; Points: Braves 15, V Team 0 | | | | Kent County Cricket Ground, Beckenham; Umpires: Neil Bainton and Lorraine Elgar |

| 18 June | Knight Riders; 196 (46.4 overs) | v | Super Strikers; 190 (49.2 overs) | Knight Riders won by 6 runs |
| Scorecard | Knight Riders; 196 (46.4 overs) | v | Super Strikers; 190 (49.2 overs) | Kent County Cricket Ground, Beckenham; Umpires: Rob Bailey and Graham Cooper |
| Scorecard | Charlotte Edwards 112 (106); Alexia Walker 4/16 (5.4 overs) | | Laura Harper 101 (134); Beth Morgan 4/33 (10 overs) | Kent County Cricket Ground, Beckenham; Umpires: Rob Bailey and Graham Cooper |
| Knight Riders won the toss and elected to bat.; Points: Knight Riders 15, Super Strikers 0 | | | | Kent County Cricket Ground, Beckenham; Umpires: Rob Bailey and Graham Cooper |

| 19 June | Braves; 145 (41.5 overs) | v | Knight Riders; 146/3 (35 overs) | Knight Riders won by 7 wickets |
| Scorecard | Braves; 145 (41.5 overs) | v | Knight Riders; 146/3 (35 overs) | Kent County Cricket Ground, Beckenham; Umpires: Rob Bailey and Graham Cooper |
| Scorecard | Clare Connor 35 (63); Bev Nicholson 2/0 (0.5 overs) | | Charlotte Edwards 66 (63); Holly Colvin 1/16 (4 overs) | Kent County Cricket Ground, Beckenham; Umpires: Rob Bailey and Graham Cooper |
| Braves won the toss and elected to bat.; Points: Knight Riders 15, Braves 0 | | | | Kent County Cricket Ground, Beckenham; Umpires: Rob Bailey and Graham Cooper |

| 19 June | Super Strikers; 217/9 (50 overs) | v | V Team; 218/7 (35 overs) | V Team won by 3 wickets |
| Scorecard | Super Strikers; 217/9 (50 overs) | v | V Team; 218/7 (35 overs) | Kent County Cricket Ground, Beckenham; Umpires: Neil Bainton and Lorraine Elgar |
| Scorecard | Jenny Gunn 66 (132); Dawn Prestidge 4/58 (10 overs) | | Claire Taylor 96 (108); Kelly Evenson 2/25 (10 overs) | Kent County Cricket Ground, Beckenham; Umpires: Neil Bainton and Lorraine Elgar |
| Super Strikers won the toss and elected to bat.; Points: V Team 15, Super Strikers 0 | | | | Kent County Cricket Ground, Beckenham; Umpires: Neil Bainton and Lorraine Elgar |

| 2 July | Braves; 166/5 (50 overs) | v | Super Strikers; 168/3 (44.1 overs) | Super Strikers won by 7 wickets |
| Scorecard | Braves; 166/5 (50 overs) | v | Super Strikers; 168/3 (44.1 overs) | Brockington Ground, Loughborough; Umpires: John Hayes and Annette Owen |
| Scorecard | Kirstie White 51* (68); Laura Harper 2/19 (8 overs) | | Jane Smit 62* (110); Steph Davies 1/16 (6.1 overs) | Brockington Ground, Loughborough; Umpires: John Hayes and Annette Owen |
| Super Strikers won the toss and elected to field.; Points: Super Strikers 15, Braves 0 | | | | Brockington Ground, Loughborough; Umpires: John Hayes and Annette Owen |

| 2 July | Knight Riders; 194/7 (50 overs) | v | V Team; 194 (48.5 overs) | Match Tied |
| Scorecard | Knight Riders; 194/7 (50 overs) | v | V Team; 194 (48.5 overs) | Haslegrave Ground, Loughborough; Umpires: Lorraine Elgar and Mary Smith |
| Scorecard | Laura Joyce 90 (137); Dawn Prestidge 3/36 (9 overs) | | Laura Newton 72 (75); Bev Nicholson 3/7 (1.5 overs) | Haslegrave Ground, Loughborough; Umpires: Lorraine Elgar and Mary Smith |
| V Team won the toss and elected to field.; Points: Knight Riders 6, V Team 6 | | | | Haslegrave Ground, Loughborough; Umpires: Lorraine Elgar and Mary Smith |

| 3 July | Braves; 141 (49.2 overs) | v | V Team; 205/8 (50 overs) | V Team won by 64 runs |
| Scorecard | Braves; 141 (49.2 overs) | v | V Team; 205/8 (50 overs) | Brockington Ground, Loughborough; Umpires: Richard Kettleborough and Ann Roberts |
| Scorecard | Steph Davies 23 (53); Laura Newton 5/27 (10 overs) | | Claire Taylor 75 (114); Rosalie Birch 3/31 (9 overs) | Brockington Ground, Loughborough; Umpires: Richard Kettleborough and Ann Roberts |
| Braves won the toss and elected to field.; Points: V Team 15, Braves 0 | | | | Brockington Ground, Loughborough; Umpires: Richard Kettleborough and Ann Roberts |

| 3 July | Knight Riders; 164 (48.2 overs) | v | Super Strikers; 166/1 (41.5 overs) | Super Strikers won by 9 wickets |
| Scorecard | Knight Riders; 164 (48.2 overs) | v | Super Strikers; 166/1 (41.5 overs) | Haslegrave Ground, Loughborough; Umpires: Jeff Evans and Annette Owen |
| Scorecard | Charlotte Edwards 44 (73); Jenny Gunn 2/14 (7 overs) | | Laura Harper 65 (106); Lynsey Askew 1/31 (10 overs) | Haslegrave Ground, Loughborough; Umpires: Jeff Evans and Annette Owen |
| Points: Super Strikers 15, Knight Riders 0 | | | | Haslegrave Ground, Loughborough; Umpires: Jeff Evans and Annette Owen |

== Twenty20 ==
=== Results ===
| Team | Pld | W | L | T | A | Pts | NRR |
|---|---|---|---|---|---|---|---|
| V Team (C) | 3 | 3 | 0 | 0 | 0 | 6 | +1.278 |
| Knight Riders | 3 | 2 | 1 | 0 | 0 | 4 | +1.077 |
| Super Strikers | 3 | 1 | 2 | 0 | 0 | 2 | −1.086 |
| Braves | 3 | 0 | 3 | 0 | 0 | 0 | −1.222 |

Source: Cricket Archive

| 25 June | Braves; 77 (13.3 overs) | v | Knight Riders; 140/4 (20 overs) | Knight Riders won by 63 runs |
| Scorecard | Braves; 77 (13.3 overs) | v | Knight Riders; 140/4 (20 overs) | Uppingham School, Uppingham; Umpires: Graham Cooper and Darrell Hair |
| Scorecard | Rosalie Birch 40* (32); Isa Guha 4/25 (4 overs) | | Charlotte Edwards 88 (60); Clare Connor 2/38 (4 overs) | Uppingham School, Uppingham; Umpires: Graham Cooper and Darrell Hair |
| Braves won the toss and elected to field.; Points: Knight Riders 2, Braves 0 | | | | Uppingham School, Uppingham; Umpires: Graham Cooper and Darrell Hair |

| 25 June | Super Strikers; 109/9 (20 overs) | v | V Team; 167/3 (20 overs) | V Team won by 58 runs |
| Scorecard | Super Strikers; 109/9 (20 overs) | v | V Team; 167/3 (20 overs) | Uppingham School, Uppingham; Umpires: Lorraine Elgar and Tim Robinson |
| Scorecard | Jenny Gunn 46 (54); Katherine Brunt 3/14 (4 overs) | | Laura Newton 64 (45); Jenny Gunn 2/20 (3 overs) | Uppingham School, Uppingham; Umpires: Lorraine Elgar and Tim Robinson |
| V Team won the toss and elected to bat.; Points: V Team 2, Super Strikers 0 | | | | Uppingham School, Uppingham; Umpires: Lorraine Elgar and Tim Robinson |

| 26 June | Braves; 114/7 (20 overs) | v | Super Strikers; 115/6 (19.4 overs) | Super Strikers won by 4 wickets |
| Scorecard | Braves; 114/7 (20 overs) | v | Super Strikers; 115/6 (19.4 overs) | Uppingham School, Uppingham; Umpires: John Hayes and Tim Robinson |
| Scorecard | Clare Connor 33 (43); Nicky Myers 1/15 (4 overs) | | Jenny Gunn 51 (54); Rosalie Birch 3/15 (3 overs) | Uppingham School, Uppingham; Umpires: John Hayes and Tim Robinson |
| Braves won the toss and elected to bat.; Points: Super Strikers 2, Braves 0 | | | | Uppingham School, Uppingham; Umpires: John Hayes and Tim Robinson |

| 26 June | Knight Riders; 104 (18.4 overs) | v | V Team; 105/3 (18.3 overs) | V Team won by 7 wickets |
| Scorecard | Knight Riders; 104 (18.4 overs) | v | V Team; 105/3 (18.3 overs) | Uppingham School, Uppingham; Umpires: Darrell Hair and Janet Rogers |
| Scorecard | Charlotte Edwards 37 (35); Dawn Prestidge 3/16 (3 overs) | | Mandie Godliman 48 (52); Jo Watts 2/20 (4 overs) | Uppingham School, Uppingham; Umpires: Darrell Hair and Janet Rogers |
| Knight Riders won the toss and elected to bat.; Points: V Team 2, Knight Riders 0 | | | | Uppingham School, Uppingham; Umpires: Darrell Hair and Janet Rogers |

| 26 June | Braves; 111/8 (20 overs) | v | V Team; 112/6 (19 overs) | V Team won by 4 wickets |
| Scorecard | Braves; 111/8 (20 overs) | v | V Team; 112/6 (19 overs) | Uppingham School, Uppingham; Umpires: John Hayes and Tim Robinson |
| Scorecard | Clare Connor 26 (41); Katherine Brunt 3/22 (4 overs) | | Mandie Godliman 21 (13); Clare Connor 2/12 (4 overs) | Uppingham School, Uppingham; Umpires: John Hayes and Tim Robinson |
| V Team won the toss and elected to field.; Points: V Team 2, Braves 0 | | | | Uppingham School, Uppingham; Umpires: John Hayes and Tim Robinson |

| 26 June | Knight Riders; 116/5 (20 overs) | v | Super Strikers; 106/8 (20 overs) | Knight Riders won by 10 runs |
| Scorecard | Knight Riders; 116/5 (20 overs) | v | Super Strikers; 106/8 (20 overs) | Uppingham School, Uppingham; Umpires: Darrell Hair and Janet Rogers |
| Scorecard | Charlotte Edwards 45 (47); Kelly Evenson 1/7 (1 over) | | Arran Brindle 37 (34); Isa Guha 2/24 (4 overs) | Uppingham School, Uppingham; Umpires: Darrell Hair and Janet Rogers |
| Knight Riders won the toss and elected to bat.; Points: Knight Riders 2, Super Strikers 0 | | | | Uppingham School, Uppingham; Umpires: Darrell Hair and Janet Rogers |
