= 2003 Super Fours =

- Administrator(s): England and Wales Cricket Board
- Cricket format: 50 over
- Tournament format(s): League system
- Champions: Knight Riders (1st title)
- Participants: 4
- Matches: 12
- Most runs: Charlotte Edwards, Knight Riders (199)
- Most wickets: Lucy Pearson, Knight Riders (10)

The 2003 Super Fours was the second cricket Super Fours tournament. It took place in May and June and saw 4 teams made up of the top players in the county compete in a 50 over league. Knight Riders were the winners of the competition, achieving their first title.

== Competition format ==
Teams played each other twice in a round-robin format, with the winners of the group winning the tournament. Matches were played using a one day format with 50 overs per side.

The group worked on a points system with positions within the divisions being based on the total points. 12 points were awarded for a win.

== Teams ==
Braves	Knight Riders	Super Strikers	V Team
(England) Clare Connor (c); (England) Yvonne Craven; (England) Steph Davies; (England) Mandie Godliman (wk); (England) Janet Godman; (England) Isa Guha; (England) Laura Harper; (England) Natalie Lane; (England) Laura Marsh; (England) Beth Morgan; (England) Ebony Rainford-Brent; (England) Sue Redfern; (England) Melissa Reynard	(England) Charlotte Edwards (c); (England) Caroline Atkins; (England) Rosalie Birch; (England) Sarah Collyer; (England) Marsha Davies; (England) Kathryn Doherty; (England) Lydia Greenway; (England) Jenny Gunn; (India) Radhi Nanalal; (England) Lucy Pearson; (England) Jane Smit (wk); (England) Helen Wardlaw	(England) Claire Taylor (c) (wk); (England) Penny Arnold (wk); (England) Salliann Briggs; (England) Sarah Clarke; (England) Janet Godman; (England) Hannah Lloyd; (England) Laura Newton; (England) Holly Penwarden; (England) Nicky Shaw; (England) Laura Spragg; (England) Debra Stock; (England) Alexia Walker; (England) Beth Wild	(England) Clare Taylor (c); (England) Claire Atkinson; (England) Arran Brindle; (England) Leanne Davis; (England) Kelly Evenson; (England) Jackie Hawker; (England) Laura Joyce (wk); (England) Kathryn Leng; (England) Alexis Mannion; (England) Nicky Myers; (England) Dawn Prestidge; (England) Gill Richards; (England) Anna Spragg (wk)

== Results ==
Team	Pld	W	L	T	A	Pts
Knight Riders (C)	6	4	1	0	1	48
Super Strikers	6	3	2	0	1	36
Braves	6	2	3	0	1	24
V Team	6	1	4	0	1	12

Source: Cricket Archive

19 May	Braves	v	Super Strikers	Match Abandoned
Scorecard	Braves	v	Super Strikers	University Parks, Oxford
No toss.; No play possible due to rain.; Points: Braves 0, Super Strikers 0				University Parks, Oxford

19 May	Knight Riders	v	V Team	Match Abandoned
Scorecard	Knight Riders	v	V Team	Marston Road, Marston
No toss.; No play possible due to rain.; Points: Knight Riders 0, V Team 0				Marston Road, Marston

25 May	Braves; 140 (47 overs)	v	Knight Riders; 141/3	Knight Riders won by 7 wickets
Scorecard	Braves; 140 (47 overs)	v	Knight Riders; 141/3	King's College, Taunton
Scorecard	Melissa Reynard 48* (–); Lucy Pearson 4/30 (10 overs)		Lydia Greenway 52* (–); Laura Harper 1/11 (5 overs)	King's College, Taunton
Knight Riders won the toss and elected to field.; Points: Knight Riders 12, Braves 0				King's College, Taunton

25 May	Super Strikers; 188/1 (– overs)	v	V Team; 187/7 (49 overs)	Super Strikers won by 9 wickets
Scorecard	Super Strikers; 188/1 (– overs)	v	V Team; 187/7 (49 overs)	King's College, Taunton
Scorecard	Claire Taylor 85* (–)		Kathryn Leng 42 (–); Laura Spragg 4/18 (10 overs)	King's College, Taunton
Super Strikers won the toss and elected to field.; Match reduced to 49 overs per side.; Points: Super Strikers 12, V Team 0				King's College, Taunton

26 May	Braves; 159/8 (50 overs)	v	V Team; 139 (44.4 overs)	Braves won by 20 runs
Scorecard	Braves; 159/8 (50 overs)	v	V Team; 139 (44.4 overs)	King's College, Taunton; Umpires: Graham Cooper and Richard Kettleborough
Scorecard	Beth Morgan 56 (126); Kathryn Leng 3/14 (3 overs)		Anna Spragg 52 (114); Isa Guha 4/23 (10 overs)	King's College, Taunton; Umpires: Graham Cooper and Richard Kettleborough
Braves won the toss and elected to bat.; Points: Braves 12, V Team 0				King's College, Taunton; Umpires: Graham Cooper and Richard Kettleborough

26 May	Knight Riders; 237/5 (50 overs)	v	Super Strikers; 149 (41.5 overs)	Knight Riders won by 88 runs
Scorecard	Knight Riders; 237/5 (50 overs)	v	Super Strikers; 149 (41.5 overs)	King's College, Taunton; Umpires: Steven Garratt and Mel Smith
Scorecard	Charlotte Edwards 114* (121); Laura Spragg 1/19 (10 overs)		Laura Spragg 27 (32); Marsha Davies 4/16 (3.5 overs)	King's College, Taunton; Umpires: Steven Garratt and Mel Smith
Super Strikers won the toss and elected to field.; Points: Knight Riders 12, Super Strikers 0				King's College, Taunton; Umpires: Steven Garratt and Mel Smith

1 June	Braves; 89/4 (32.4 overs)	v	V Team; 88 (44.4 overs)	Braves won by 6 wickets
Scorecard	Braves; 89/4 (32.4 overs)	v	V Team; 88 (44.4 overs)	Sonning Lane, Reading; Umpires: Neil Bainton and Sian Priest
Scorecard	Mandie Godliman 30 (78); Nicky Myers 1/12 (10 overs)		Arran Brindle 16 (79); Clare Connor 4/12 (10 overs)	Sonning Lane, Reading; Umpires: Neil Bainton and Sian Priest
V Team won the toss and elected to bat.; Points: Braves 12, V Team 0				Sonning Lane, Reading; Umpires: Neil Bainton and Sian Priest

1 June	Knight Riders; 139/9 (50 overs)	v	Super Strikers; 140/6 (44.5 overs)	Super Strikers won by 4 wickets
Scorecard	Knight Riders; 139/9 (50 overs)	v	Super Strikers; 140/6 (44.5 overs)	Sonning Lane, Reading; Umpires: Rob Bailey and Lorraine Elgar
Scorecard	Charlotte Edwards 47 (79); Alexia Walker 3/28 (10 overs)		Laura Newton 71 (127); Radhi Nanalal 2/19 (8 overs)	Sonning Lane, Reading; Umpires: Rob Bailey and Lorraine Elgar
Knight Riders won the toss and elected to bat.; Points: Super Strikers 12, Knight Riders 0				Sonning Lane, Reading; Umpires: Rob Bailey and Lorraine Elgar

15 June	Braves; 125 (45.5 overs)	v	Super Strikers; 156/7 (50 overs)	Super Strikers won by 31 runs
Scorecard	Braves; 125 (45.5 overs)	v	Super Strikers; 156/7 (50 overs)	Boots Ground, Nottingham; Umpires: Tim Robinson and Trevor Waite
Scorecard	Beth Morgan 32 (98); Laura Newton 3/26 (6.5 overs)		Hannah Lloyd 47 (82); Laura Harper 3/37 (8 overs)	Boots Ground, Nottingham; Umpires: Tim Robinson and Trevor Waite
Super Strikers won the toss and elected to bat.; Points: Super Strikers 12, Braves 0				Boots Ground, Nottingham; Umpires: Tim Robinson and Trevor Waite

15 June	Knight Riders; 98/4 (36 overs)	v	V Team; 95 (41.5 overs)	Knight Riders won by 6 wickets
Scorecard	Knight Riders; 98/4 (36 overs)	v	V Team; 95 (41.5 overs)	Caythorpe Road, Caythorpe; Umpires: Richard Illingworth and Ann Roberts
Scorecard	Charlotte Edwards 23 (63); Nicky Myers 1/16 (8 overs)		Gill Richards 19 (48); Marsha Davies 4/16 (8 overs)	Caythorpe Road, Caythorpe; Umpires: Richard Illingworth and Ann Roberts
V Team won the toss and elected to bat.; Points: Knight Riders 12, V Team 0				Caythorpe Road, Caythorpe; Umpires: Richard Illingworth and Ann Roberts

21 June	Braves; 164 (50 overs)	v	Knight Riders; 165/5 (45.5 overs)	Knight Riders won by 5 wickets
Scorecard	Braves; 164 (50 overs)	v	Knight Riders; 165/5 (45.5 overs)	University Parks, Oxford; Umpires: Don Clarke and Alan Hill
Scorecard	Sue Redfern 53 (118); Lucy Pearson 4/20 (10 overs)		Lydia Greenway 87* (122); Melissa Reynard 1/18 (4 overs)	University Parks, Oxford; Umpires: Don Clarke and Alan Hill
Braves won the toss and elected to bat.; Points: Knight Riders 12, Braves 0				University Parks, Oxford; Umpires: Don Clarke and Alan Hill

21 June	Super Strikers; 154 (49.5 overs)	v	V Team; 220/6 (50 overs)	V Team won by 66 runs
Scorecard	Super Strikers; 154 (49.5 overs)	v	V Team; 220/6 (50 overs)	Radley College, Abingdon; Umpires: Michael Dixon and John Hayes
Scorecard	Hannah Lloyd 34 (81); Kelly Evenson 3/12 (10 overs)		Arran Brindle 98 (120); Alexia Walker 2/36 (8 overs)	Radley College, Abingdon; Umpires: Michael Dixon and John Hayes
Super Strikers won the toss and elected to field.; Points: V Team 12, Super Strikers 0				Radley College, Abingdon; Umpires: Michael Dixon and John Hayes
