= 2004 Super Fours =

- Administrator(s): England and Wales Cricket Board
- Cricket format: 50 over
- Tournament format(s): League system
- Champions: V Team (1st title)
- Participants: 4
- Matches: 12
- Most runs: Charlotte Edwards, Knight Riders (386)
- Most wickets: Clare Taylor, Knight Riders (14)

The 2004 Super Fours was the third cricket Super Fours season. It took place in May and June and saw 4 teams compete in a 50 over league and, for the first time, a knockout Twenty20 tournament. V Team were the winners of both tournaments.

== Competition format ==
In the one day tournament, teams played each other twice in a round-robin format, with the winners of the group winning the tournament. Matches were played using a one day format with 50 overs per side.

The group worked on a points system with positions within the divisions being based on the total points. Points were awarded as follows:

Win: 15 points.
Tie: 6 points.
Loss: 0 points.

A Twenty20 competition was added for the 2004 edition of the Super Fours, which consisted of two semi-finals, with the winners proceeding to the Final and the losers playing in a third-place play-off.

== Teams ==
| Braves | Knight Riders | Super Strikers | V Team |
|---|---|---|---|
| (England) Clare Connor (c); (England) Colleen Ashbee; (England) Caroline Atkins; (England) Rosalie Birch; (England) Katherine Brunt; (England) Sarah Clarke; (England) Steph Davies; (England) Leanne Davis; (England) Mandie Godliman (wk); (England) Jackie Hawker; (England) Natalie Lane; (England) Hannah Lloyd; (England) Laura Marsh; (England) Lucy Pearson | (England) Charlotte Edwards (c); (England) Lynsey Askew; (England) Laura Boorman; (England) Heather Booth; (England) Katherine Brunt; (England) Yvonne Craven; (England) Lydia Greenway; (England) Isa Guha; (England) Laura Joyce (wk); (England) Natalie Lane; (England) Alexis Mannion; (England) Beth Morgan; (England) Sian Phillips (wk); (England) Robyn Still; (England) Clare Taylor; (England) Kirstie White; (England) Beth Wild | (England) Salliann Briggs (c); (England) Claire Atkinson; (England) Laura Boorman; (England) Kelly Evenson; (England) Jenny Gunn; (England) Laura Harper; (England) Charlotte Horton; (England) Kathryn Leng; (England) Nicky Myers; (England) Gill Richards; (England) Sarah Rigg; (England) Nicky Shaw; (England) Jane Smit (wk); (England) Alexia Walker | (England) Laura Newton (c); (England) Arran Brindle; (England) Kathryn Doherty; (England) Dawn Holden; (England) Sian Phillips (wk); (England) Dawn Prestidge; (England) Melissa Reynard; (England) Sarah Rigg; (England) Anna Spragg (wk); (England) Laura Spragg; (England) Robyn Still; (England) Claire Taylor; (England) Rachael Walsh; (England) Helen Wardlaw |

== 50 over ==
=== Results ===
| Team | Pld | W | L | T | A | Pts |
|---|---|---|---|---|---|---|
| V Team (C) | 6 | 3 | 2 | 1 | 0 | 51 |
| Braves | 6 | 3 | 3 | 0 | 0 | 45 |
| Super Strikers | 6 | 3 | 3 | 0 | 0 | 45 |
| Knight Riders | 6 | 2 | 3 | 1 | 0 | 36 |

Source: Cricket Archive

| 15 May | Braves; 144 (43 overs) | v | V Team; 146/5 (43.3 overs) | V Team won by 5 wickets |
| Scorecard | Braves; 144 (43 overs) | v | V Team; 146/5 (43.3 overs) | King's College, Taunton; Umpires: Graham Cooper and Steven Garratt |
| Scorecard | Caroline Atkins 31 (99); Arran Brindle 3/8 (7 overs) | | Claire Taylor 68* (88); Lucy Pearson 2/28 (10 overs) | King's College, Taunton; Umpires: Graham Cooper and Steven Garratt |
| V Team won the toss and elected to field.; Points: V Team 15, Braves 0 | | | | King's College, Taunton; Umpires: Graham Cooper and Steven Garratt |

| 15 May | Knight Riders; 169 (49 overs) | v | Super Strikers; 171/5 (48.4 overs) | Super Strikers won by 5 wickets |
| Scorecard | Knight Riders; 169 (49 overs) | v | Super Strikers; 171/5 (48.4 overs) | King's College, Taunton; Umpires: Neil Bainton and Sian Priest |
| Scorecard | Charlotte Edwards 38 (70); Jenny Gunn 3/28 (9 overs) | | Jane Smit 39* (75); Clare Taylor 2/15 (9 overs) | King's College, Taunton; Umpires: Neil Bainton and Sian Priest |
| Knight Riders won the toss and elected to bat.; Points: Super Strikers 15, Knight Riders 0 | | | | King's College, Taunton; Umpires: Neil Bainton and Sian Priest |

| 23 May | Braves; 168 (47.4 overs) | v | Knight Riders; 220 (50 overs) | Knight Riders won by 52 runs |
| Scorecard | Braves; 168 (47.4 overs) | v | Knight Riders; 220 (50 overs) | King's College, Taunton; Umpires: Rob Bailey and Graham Cooper |
| Scorecard | Clare Connor 68 (94); Beth Morgan 4/32 (9.4 overs) | | Charlotte Edwards 119 (124); Rosalie Birch 5/43 (10 overs) | King's College, Taunton; Umpires: Rob Bailey and Graham Cooper |
| Knight Riders won the toss and elected to bat.; Points: Knight Riders 15, Braves 0 | | | | King's College, Taunton; Umpires: Rob Bailey and Graham Cooper |

| 23 May | Super Strikers; 146 (46.3 overs) | v | V Team; 147/4 (36.4 overs) | V Team won by 6 wickets |
| Scorecard | Super Strikers; 146 (46.3 overs) | v | V Team; 147/4 (36.4 overs) | King's College, Taunton; Umpires: Don Clarke and Richard Illingworth |
| Scorecard | Laura Harper 40 (71); Helen Wardlaw 5/37 (9.3 overs) | | Sarah Taylor 70 (76); Laura Harper 3/31 (8 overs) | King's College, Taunton; Umpires: Don Clarke and Richard Illingworth |
| Super Strikers won the toss and elected to bat.; Points: V Team 15, Super Strikers 0 | | | | King's College, Taunton; Umpires: Don Clarke and Richard Illingworth |

| 30 May | Braves; 181 (49.4 overs) | v | Super Strikers; 54 (21.1 overs) | Braves won by 127 runs |
| Scorecard | Braves; 181 (49.4 overs) | v | Super Strikers; 54 (21.1 overs) | Sonning Lane, Reading; Umpires: Rob Bailey and Graham Cooper |
| Scorecard | Rosalie Birch 31 (54); Kathryn Leng 3/42 (9.4 overs) | | Laura Boorman 9 (24); Rosalie Birch 3/7 (5.1 overs) | Sonning Lane, Reading; Umpires: Rob Bailey and Graham Cooper |
| Braves won the toss and elected to bat.; Points: Braves 15, Super Strikers 0 | | | | Sonning Lane, Reading; Umpires: Rob Bailey and Graham Cooper |

| 30 May | Knight Riders; 225/7 (50 overs) | v | V Team; 228/9 (50 overs) | V Team won by 1 wicket |
| Scorecard | Knight Riders; 225/7 (50 overs) | v | V Team; 228/9 (50 overs) | Sonning Lane, Reading; Umpires: Lorraine Elgar and Steven Garratt |
| Scorecard | Charlotte Edwards 103 (117); Arran Brindle 3/34 (8 overs) | | Claire Taylor 80 (107); Clare Taylor 3/28 (10 overs) | Sonning Lane, Reading; Umpires: Lorraine Elgar and Steven Garratt |
| Knight Riders won the toss and elected to bat.; Points: V Team 15, Knight Riders 0 | | | | Sonning Lane, Reading; Umpires: Lorraine Elgar and Steven Garratt |

| 31 May | Braves; 180 (48.5 overs) | v | Knight Riders; 184/8 (49.1 overs) | Knight Riders won by 2 wickets |
| Scorecard | Braves; 180 (48.5 overs) | v | Knight Riders; 184/8 (49.1 overs) | Sonning Lane, Reading; Umpires: Lorraine Elgar and Richard Illingworth |
| Scorecard | Mandie Godliman 57 (101); Isa Guha 4/21 (9.5 overs) | | Clare Taylor 42* (63); Lucy Pearson 2/28 (10 overs) | Sonning Lane, Reading; Umpires: Lorraine Elgar and Richard Illingworth |
| Braves won the toss and elected to bat.; Points: Knight Riders 15, V Team 0 | | | | Sonning Lane, Reading; Umpires: Lorraine Elgar and Richard Illingworth |

| 31 May | Super Strikers; 89/2 (24.2 overs) | v | V Team; 88 (42.5 overs) | Super Strikers won by 8 wickets |
| Scorecard | Super Strikers; 89/2 (24.2 overs) | v | V Team; 88 (42.5 overs) | Sonning Lane, Reading; Umpires: Neil Bainton and Graham Cooper |
| Scorecard | Jane Smit 49 (79); Laura Spragg 1/22 (6 overs) | | Arran Brindle 40* (86); Nicky Myers 4/7 (10 overs) | Sonning Lane, Reading; Umpires: Neil Bainton and Graham Cooper |
| V Team won the toss and elected to bat.; Points: Super Strikers 15, V Team 0 | | | | Sonning Lane, Reading; Umpires: Neil Bainton and Graham Cooper |

| 13 June | Braves; 140 (48.3 overs) | v | Super Strikers; 114 (36.1 overs) | Braves won by 26 runs |
| Scorecard | Braves; 140 (48.3 overs) | v | Super Strikers; 114 (36.1 overs) | Caythorpe Road, Caythorpe; Umpires: Richard Jones and Tim Robinson |
| Scorecard | Caroline Atkins 27 (63); Nicky Myers 2/9 (10 overs) | | Nicky Shaw 52 (65); Lucy Pearson 3/22 (10 overs) | Caythorpe Road, Caythorpe; Umpires: Richard Jones and Tim Robinson |
| Braves won the toss and elected to bat.; Points: Braves 15, Super Strikers 0 | | | | Caythorpe Road, Caythorpe; Umpires: Richard Jones and Tim Robinson |

| 13 June | Knight Riders; 226/6 (50 overs) | v | V Team; 226 (48.3 overs) | Match Tied |
| Scorecard | Knight Riders; 226/6 (50 overs) | v | V Team; 226 (48.3 overs) | Caythorpe Road, Caythorpe; Umpires: Rob Bailey and Annette Owen |
| Scorecard | Laura Joyce 67 (83); Dawn Holden 2/28 (10 overs) | | Claire Taylor 95 (119); Clare Taylor 4/40 (8.3 overs) | Caythorpe Road, Caythorpe; Umpires: Rob Bailey and Annette Owen |
| V Team won the toss and elected to field.; Points: Knight Riders 6, V Team 6 | | | | Caythorpe Road, Caythorpe; Umpires: Rob Bailey and Annette Owen |

| 19 June | Braves; 192/8 (46.5 overs) | v | V Team; 187/3 (47 overs) | Braves won by 2 wickets (D/L) |
| Scorecard | Braves; 192/8 (46.5 overs) | v | V Team; 187/3 (47 overs) | Haslegrave Ground, Loughborough; Umpires: Richard Illingworth and Janet Rogers |
| Scorecard | Hannah Lloyd 43 (72); Laura Spragg 4/34 (7.5 overs) | | Melissa Reynard 54 (131); Clare Connor 1/28 (9 overs) | Haslegrave Ground, Loughborough; Umpires: Richard Illingworth and Janet Rogers |
| Braves won the toss and elected to field.; Match reduced to 47 overs per side.; Points: Braves 15, V Team 0 | | | | Haslegrave Ground, Loughborough; Umpires: Richard Illingworth and Janet Rogers |

| 19 June | Knight Riders; 202/7 (50 overs) | v | Super Strikers; 210/7 (50 overs) | Super Strikers won by 8 runs |
| Scorecard | Knight Riders; 202/7 (50 overs) | v | Super Strikers; 210/7 (50 overs) | Haslegrave Ground, Loughborough; Umpires: Neil Bainton and Trevor Waite |
| Scorecard | Charlotte Edwards 82 (–); Laura Harper 3/32 (10 overs) | | Nicky Shaw 72 (93); Charlotte Edwards 3/31 (7 overs) | Haslegrave Ground, Loughborough; Umpires: Neil Bainton and Trevor Waite |
| Super Strikers won the toss and elected to bat.; Points: Super Strikers 15, Braves 0 | | | | Haslegrave Ground, Loughborough; Umpires: Neil Bainton and Trevor Waite |

== Twenty20 ==
=== Semi-finals ===
| 29 May | Braves; 131/8 (20 overs) | v | Super Strikers; 119/9 (20 overs) | Braves won by 12 runs |
| Scorecard | Braves; 131/8 (20 overs) | v | Super Strikers; 119/9 (20 overs) | The Rose Bowl, Southampton; Umpires: Neil Bainton and Sian Priest |
| Scorecard | Clare Connor 29 (29); Nicky Myers 2/17 (4 overs) | | Salliann Briggs 34 (26); Steph Davies 4/21 (4 overs) | The Rose Bowl, Southampton; Umpires: Neil Bainton and Sian Priest |
| Braves won the toss and elected to bat.; Braves progress to the final. | | | | The Rose Bowl, Southampton; Umpires: Neil Bainton and Sian Priest |

| 29 May | Knight Riders; 90 (18.4 overs) | v | V Team; 111/5 (20 overs) | V Team won by 21 runs |
| Scorecard | Knight Riders; 90 (18.4 overs) | v | V Team; 111/5 (20 overs) | The Rose Bowl Nursery Ground, Southampton; Umpires: Don Clarke and Lorraine Elgar |
| Scorecard | Clare Taylor 36* (50); Dawn Holden 3/13 (4 overs) | | Arran Brindle 34 (44); Charlotte Edwards 1/12 (2 overs) | The Rose Bowl Nursery Ground, Southampton; Umpires: Don Clarke and Lorraine Elgar |
| V Team won the toss and elected to bat.; V Team progress to the final. | | | | The Rose Bowl Nursery Ground, Southampton; Umpires: Don Clarke and Lorraine Elgar |

=== Third-place play-off ===
| 29 May | Knight Riders; 114/6 (20 overs) | v | Super Strikers; 110/7 (20 overs) | Knight Riders won by 4 runs |
| Scorecard | Knight Riders; 114/6 (20 overs) | v | Super Strikers; 110/7 (20 overs) | The Rose Bowl Nursery Ground, Southampton; Umpires: Don Clarke and Sian Priest |
| Scorecard | Charlotte Edwards 28 (27); Laura Harper 3/13 (4 overs) | | Jenny Gunn 31* (26); Yvonne Craven 3/15 (4 overs) | The Rose Bowl Nursery Ground, Southampton; Umpires: Don Clarke and Sian Priest |

=== Final ===
| 29 May | Braves; 114/6 (20 overs) | v | V Team; 117/2 (18.5 overs) | V Team won by 8 wickets |
| Scorecard | Braves; 114/6 (20 overs) | v | V Team; 117/2 (18.5 overs) | The Rose Bowl, Southampton; Umpires: Neil Bainton and Lorraine Elgar |
| Scorecard | Clare Connor 37* (37); Dawn Holden 2/25 (4 overs) | | Claire Taylor 49* (45); Caroline Atkins 1/11 (2 overs) | The Rose Bowl, Southampton; Umpires: Neil Bainton and Lorraine Elgar |
| Braves won the toss and elected to bat.; V Team won the Super Fours Twenty20 2004. | | | | The Rose Bowl, Southampton; Umpires: Neil Bainton and Lorraine Elgar |
