= England women's cricket team in India in 2001–02 =

English women's cricket team in India in 2001–02
	India	England
- Dates: 4 – 24 January 2002
Captains	Anjum Chopra	Clare Connor

Test series
- Result: 1-match series drawn 0–0
Most runs	Hemlata Kala (110)	Caroline Atkins (90)
Most wickets	Neetu David (4)	Clare Connor (2); Clare Taylor (2)

One Day International series
- Results: India won the 5-match series 5–0
Most runs	Mithali Raj (137)	Arran Brindle (159)
Most wickets	Neetu David (10)	Lucy Pearson (3); Dawn Holden (3)
- Player of the series: Mithali Raj (Ind)

The English women's cricket team toured India in January 2002. They played India in 5 One Day Internationals and 1 Test match. India won the ODI series 5–0, whilst the Test match was drawn.

== Squads ==
India	England
Anjum Chopra (c); Nooshin Al Khadeer; Neetu David; Jhulan Goswami; Bindeshwari Goyal; Anju Jain (wk); Hemlata Kala; Arundhati Kirkire; Mamatha Maben; Deepa Marathe; Mithali Raj; Jaya Sharma; Amrita Shinde; Sunita Singh	Clare Connor (c); Caroline Atkins; Arran Brindle; Sarah Clarke; Mandie Godliman (wk); Jackie Hawker; Dawn Holden; Kate Lowe; Laura Newton; Lucy Pearson; Jane Smit (wk); Laura Spragg; Clare Taylor; Helen Wardlaw

== Tour Matches ==
=== 50-over match: Women's Cricket Association of India v England ===
4 January 2002
Scorecard

Women's Cricket Association of India; 137/9 (50 overs)	v	England; 139/4 (46.1 overs)
Dwarakanath Kamashki 34 (78); Dawn Holden 2/9 (6 overs)		Arran Brindle 65* (154); Seema Bhowmick 1/20 (6 overs)

England Women won by 6 wickets
Guru Nanak College Ground, Chennai
Umpires: Krishnamachari Bharatan (Ind) and Ramamurthy Sundar (Ind)

- Toss not known.

=== 2-day match: Women's Cricket Association of India v England ===
11–12 January 2002
Scorecard

Women's Cricket Association of India	v	England
101 (41.2 overs); Sulakshana Naik 44 (51); Dawn Holden 3/25 (11 overs)		148 (57 overs); Caroline Atkins 42 (104); Savita Nirala 4/10 (7 overs)
146/9d (54 overs); Reema Malhotra 32 (51); Helen Wardlaw 6/33 (18 overs)		59/4 (20 overs); Jane Smit 32* (54); Usha Bhogade 2/12 (7 overs)

Match drawn
Tata Energy Research Institute Oval, Gurgaon
Umpires: Bishan Das (Ind) and Paramjit Singh (Ind)

- Women's Cricket Association of India won the toss and elected to bat.

=== 50-over match: Women's Cricket Association of India v England ===
19 January 2002
Scorecard

England; 202/6 (50 overs)	v	Women's Cricket Association of India; 92 (36 overs)
Caroline Atkins 96* (139); Amita Patel 1/14 (6 overs)		Reema Malhotra 25 (34); Clare Connor 3/1 (3 overs)

England Women won by 110 runs
Middle Income Group Club Ground, Mumbai
Umpires: Kiran Anja (Ind) and Avdhoot Gokhale (Ind)

- Women's Cricket Association of India won the toss and elected to field.

=== 50-over match: Women's Cricket Association of India v England ===
23 January 2002
Scorecard

Women's Cricket Association of India; 149/8 (50 overs)	v	England; 153/7 (49.2 overs)
Amita Patel 28* (61); Clare Connor 2/10 (6 overs)		Jane Smit 30 (87); Bindeshwari Goyal 2/25 (10 overs)

England Women won by 3 wickets
Nehru Stadium, Pune
Umpires: Sunil Dighe (Ind) and Anil Karve (Ind)

- England Women won the toss and elected to field.

== WODI Series ==
=== 1st ODI ===
6 January 2002
Scorecard

England; 106 (44.4 overs)	v	India; 110/2 (27.4 overs)
Clare Connor 22 (59); Neetu David 4/14 (9 overs)		Mithali Raj 36* (33); Arran Brindle 1/10 (2 overs)

India Women won by 8 wickets
Guru Nanak College Ground, Chennai
Umpires: Kutticode Murali (Ind) and G. A. Pratapkumar (Ind)
Player of the match: Neetu David (Ind)

- India Women won the toss and elected to field.
- Mandie Godliman (Eng), Jhulan Goswami and Jaya Sharma (Ind) all made their WODI debuts.

=== 2nd ODI ===
8 January 2002
Scorecard

England; 71/7 (23 overs)	v	India; 72/1 (20 overs)
Dawn Holden 13* (18); Jhulan Goswami 3/8 (5 overs)		Anjum Chopra 37* (57)

India Women won by 9 wickets
Lal Bahadur Shastri Stadium, Hyderabad
Umpires: Chandra Kumar (Ind) and Ramesh Jadhav (Ind)
Player of the match: Jhulan Goswami (Ind)

- India Women won the toss and elected to field.
- Match reduced to 23 overs per side due to rain.
- Helen Wardlaw (Eng) and Nooshin Al Khadeer (Ind) both made their WODI debuts.

=== 3rd ODI ===
9 January 2002
Scorecard

India; 191/5 (50 overs)	v	England; 78 (42.3 overs)
Mamatha Maben 53* (86); Lucy Pearson 1/26 (10 overs)		Arran Brindle 21 (47); Mithali Raj 3/4 (4.3 overs)

India Women won by 113 runs
Lal Bahadur Shastri Stadium, Hyderabad
Umpires: Ivaturi Shivram (Ind) and P Prakash (Ind)
Player of the match: Mithali Raj (Ind)

- England Women won the toss and elected to field.

=== 4th ODI ===
21 January 2002
Scorecard

England; 142 (48 overs)	v	India; 143/5 (41.4 overs)
Arran Brindle 55 (112); Neetu David 4/13 (10 overs)		Anjum Chopra 49* (95); Lucy Pearson 2/24 (10 overs)

India Women won by 5 wickets
Middle Income Group Club Ground, Mumbai
Umpires: B. Jamula (Ind) and V. M. Gupte (Ind)
Player of the match: Anjum Chopra (Ind)

- England Women won the toss and elected to bat.
- Amrita Shinde (Ind) made her WODI debut.

=== 5th ODI ===
24 January 2002
Scorecard

England; 180/6 (50 overs)	v	India; 182/4 (46.4 overs)
Arran Brindle 67 (128); Neetu David 1/28 (8 overs)		Amrita Shinde 78 (124); Clare Taylor 1/17 (8 overs)

India Women won by 6 wickets
Nehru Stadium, Pune
Player of the match: Amrita Shinde (Ind)

- England Women won the toss and elected to bat.

== Only Test ==
14 – 17 January 2002
Scorecard

England	v	India
314 (165.3 overs); Caroline Atkins 90 (–); Neetu David 4/88 (51 overs)		312/9 (146 overs); Hemlata Kala 110 (–); Clare Connor 2/32 (16 overs)

Match drawn
K. D. Singh Babu Stadium, Lucknow
Umpires: Rajan Seth (Ind) and S. K. Bansal (Ind)
Player of the match: Hemlata Kala (Ind)

- England Women won the toss and elected to bat.
- Jackie Hawker, Helen Wardlaw (Eng), Jhulan Goswami, Bindeshwari Goyal, Arundhati Kirkire, Mamatha Maben, Mithali Raj and Amrita Shinde (Ind) all made their WTest debuts.
