= 1999 Women's European Cricket Championship =

- Dates: 19 – 21 July 1999
- Cricket format: ODI (50-over)
- Tournament format: Round-robin
- Host: Denmark
- Champions: England (5th title)
- Participants: 4
- Matches: 6
- Player of the series: (Ireland) Clare Shillington
- Most runs: (England) Kate Lowe (98)
- Most wickets: (England) Laura Harper (9)

The 1999 Women's European Cricket Championship was an international cricket tournament held in Denmark from 19 to 21 July 1999. It was the fifth edition of the Women's European Championship, and the second to be held in Denmark (after the inaugural 1989 edition). All matches at the tournament held One Day International (ODI) status.

Four teams participated, with the hosts, Denmark, joined by the three other European members of the International Women's Cricket Council (IWCC) – England, Ireland, and the Netherlands. England, which had dominated all other editions of the tournament, did not send a full-strength team. Despite this, England went on to win all three of its round-robin matches, claiming a fifth consecutive title. For the first time since 1989, no final was played, although both England and Ireland were undefeated going into their final match, making that a de facto final. Ireland's Clare Shillington was named player of the tournament, while two Englishwomen, Kate Lowe and Laura Harper, led the tournament in runs and wickets, respectively. All matches at the tournament were played in at the Nykøbing Mors Cricket Club.

== Squads ==
Denmark	England	Ireland	Netherlands
Janni Jønsson (c); Dorte Christensen; Eva Christensen; Mette Frost; Mette Gregersen; Malene Iversen; Pernille Jønsson; Karin Mikkelsen; Inger Nielsen; Susanne Nielsen; Vibeke Nielsen; Lene Slebsager; Lene Vilsgaard	Ella Donnison (c); Arran Thompson; Laura Harper; Jackie Hawker; Dawn Holden; Hannah Lloyd; Kate Lowe; Beth Morgan; Bev Nicholson; Nicki Shaw; Laura Spragg; Kath Wilkins; Katharine Winks	Miriam Grealey (c); Caitriona Beggs; Sandra Dawson; Isobel Joyce; Anne Linehan; Barbara McDonald; Ciara Metcalfe; Clare O'Leary; Clare Shillington; Nikki Squire; Heather Whelan	Pauline te Beest (c); Jiska Howard; Debbie Kooij; Maartje Köster; Sandra Kottman; Cheraldine Oudolf; Caroline Rambaldo; Helmien Rambaldo; Elise Reynolds; Carolien Salomons; Annemarie Tanke; Carly Verheul

== Points table ==
Team	Pld	W	L	T	NR	Pts	NRR
England	3	3	0	0	0	6	+1.226
Ireland	3	2	1	0	0	4	+0.630
Denmark	3	1	2	0	0	2	–1.099
Netherlands	3	0	3	0	0	0	–0.675

Source: CricketArchive

== Fixtures ==
19 July
Scorecard

Ireland; 162/5 (50 overs)	v	Denmark; 120/8 (50 overs)

Ireland won by 42 runs
Nykøbing Mors Cricket Club
Player of the match: Clare Shillington (Ire)

- Denmark won the toss and elected to bowl.

19 July
Scorecard

Netherlands; 92 (47.4 overs))	v	England; 93/4 (38.2 overs)

England won by 6 wickets
Nykøbing Mors Cricket Club
Player of the match: Laura Harper (Eng)

- England won the toss and elected to bowl.

20 July
Scorecard

England; 200/7 (50 overs)	v	Denmark; 59 (35.1 overs)

England won by 141 runs
Nykøbing Mors Cricket Club

- Denmark won the toss and elected to bowl.

20 July
Scorecard

Netherlands; 69 (42.4 overs)	v	Ireland; 70/1 (28.3 overs)

Ireland won by 9 wickets
Nykøbing Mors Cricket Club
Player of the match: Clare O'Leary (Ire)

- Netherlands won the toss and elected to bat.

21 July
Scorecard

Netherlands; 88 (40.3 overs)	v	Denmark; 90/7 (41.3 overs)

Denmark won by 3 wickets
Nykøbing Mors Cricket Club

- Netherlands won the toss and elected to bat.

21 July
Scorecard

Ireland; 108/8 (50 overs)	v	England; 109/8 (47.5 overs)

England won by 2 wickets
Nykøbing Mors Cricket Club
Player of the match: Barbara McDonald

- England won the toss and elected to bowl.

== Statistics ==
=== Most runs ===
The top five run scorers (total runs) are included in this table.

Player	Team	Runs	Inns	Avg	Highest	100s	50s
Kate Lowe	Ireland	98	3	98.00	57*	0	1
Caitriona Beggs	Ireland	78	3	26.00	42	0	0
Kath Wilkins	England	66	3	22.00	27	0	0
Pauline te Beest	Netherlands	63	3	21.00	29	0	0
Clare O'Leary	Ireland	59	3	29.50	32*	0	0

Source: CricketArchive

=== Most wickets ===
The top five wicket takers are listed in this table, listed by wickets taken and then by bowling average.

Player	Team	Overs	Wkts	Ave	SR	Econ	BBI
Laura Harper	England	26.4	9	7.00	17.77	2.36	5/12
Dawn Holden	England	28.0	6	9.33	28.00	2.00	3/29
Susanne Nielsen	Denmark	22.3	6	14.50	22.50	3.86	3/5
Mette Gregersen	Denmark	30.0	5	5.40	36.00	0.90	4/6
Heather Whelan	Ireland	19.4	5	9.20	26.00	2.12	3/14

Source: CricketArchive
