= Emeralds (Super Fours) =

English women's cricket team

Personnel
- Captain: Heather Knight (2013); Caroline Atkins (2012); Jo Cook (2009); Nicky Shaw (2008); Alexia Walker (2007); Arran Brindle (2005–2006); Salliann Briggs (2004); Claire Taylor (2002–2003)

Team information
- Colours: Green
- Established: 2002

History
- SF50 wins: 0
- SFT20 wins: 0

Emeralds, previously known as Super Strikers, were an English women's cricket team that competed in the Super Fours. The squad varied from season to season, but was made up of some of the top players in English cricket. They were captained by various England players, including Claire Taylor and Arran Brindle. They were the only Super Fours side to never win a competition.

== History ==
=== 2002–2005: Super Strikers ===
The Super Fours was established in 2002 as a way of bridging the gap between women's county cricket and international cricket, bringing together the top players in England. Super Strikers was one of the teams established, and was captained by Claire Taylor. They finished 4th in the first 50 over tournament that took place, winning 2 out of 6 games. The Super Strikers achieved their best finishes in 2003 and 2005, when they finished 2nd, but overall were the worst-performing Super Fours side.

=== 2006–2013: Emeralds ===
In 2006 the side was renamed Emeralds, but brought little change in fortunes, as they finished bottom of the 50 over group, and 3rd in the Twenty20 tournament. Emeralds did not find much improvement over subsequent years, failing to finish above 3rd in the 50 over tournament. They did reach the Twenty20 final in the last Super Fours season, 2013, but lost to Sapphires by 5 wickets.

== Seasons ==
=== Super Fours ===
Season	League standings							Notes
Season	P	W	L	T	A	Pts	Pos	Notes
2002	6	2	4	0	0	24	4th	
2003	6	3	2	0	1	36	2nd	
2004	6	3	3	0	0	45	3rd	
2005	6	4	2	0	0	60	2nd	
2006	6	1	4	1	0	22	4th	
2007	6	2	3	0	1	42	3rd	
2008	6	2	2	0	2	54	3rd	
2011	2	0	2	0	0	–	–	No overall standings
2012	2	1	1	0	0	–	–	No overall standings
2013	2	1	0	0	1	–	–	No overall standings

=== Super Fours Twenty20 ===
Year	Played	Wins	Losses	Tied	NR	Standing
2004	2	0	2	0	0	4th
2005	3	1	2	0	0	3rd in group
2006	2	1	1	0	0	Won 3rd place play-off
2007	Tournament Abandoned					
2008	2	0	2	0	0	4th
2011	2	0	2	0	0	4th
2012	2	0	2	0	0	4th
2013	2	1	1	0	0	Lost to Sapphires in the final
