= Hemlata Kala =

Indian cricketer

Personal information
- Full name: Hemlata Kala
- Born: 15 August 1975 (age 51); Agra, India
- Batting: Right-handed
- Bowling: Right-arm medium
- Role: All-rounder

International information
- National side: India (1999–2008)
- Test debut (cap 49): 15 July 1999 v England
- Last Test: 29 August 2006 v England
- ODI debut (cap 55): 26 June 1999 v Ireland
- Last ODI: 9 September 2008 v England
- Only T20I (cap 6): 5 August 2006 v England

Domestic team information
- Years: Team
- 1992/93–1994/95: Uttar Pradesh
- 1995/96–2011/12: Railways

Career statistics
Competition	WTest	WODI	WT20I	WLA
Matches	7	78	1	180
Runs scored	503	1,023	5	3,119
Batting average	50.30	20.87	–	28.09
100s/50s	2/3	0/3	0/0	1/14
Top score	110	65	5*	106*
Balls bowled	206	385	24	481
Wickets	5	8	0	19
Bowling average	19.60	35.75	–	22.26
5 wickets in innings	0	0	0	0
10 wickets in match	0	0	0	0
Best bowling	3/18	3/31	–	3/10
Catches/stumpings	3/–	11/–	0/–	22/–
- Source: CricketArchive, 18 August 2022

Hemlata Kala (born 15 August 1975) is an Indian former cricket all-rounder, who played as a right-handed batter and right-arm medium bowler. She appeared in seven Test matches, 78 One Day Internationals and one Twenty20 International for India between 1999 and 2008. She played domestic cricket for Uttar Pradesh and Railways.

== Test centuries ==
Runs	Match	Opponents	City	Venue	Year
110	2	England	Lucknow, India	K. D. Singh Babu Stadium	2002
110	5	New Zealand	Vapi, India	Bilakhiya Stadium	2003

- Source: CricInfo
