= List of cricket grounds in Denmark =

Cricket in Denmark dates back to the mid 19th century, with the first club being formed in 1865 by English railway engineers. The first organised match was played the following year between two teams of English players, with the first matches involving Danish players taking place in 1866. Today the sport is a minority sport within Denmark, which has an active men's team which used to play in the English domestic one-day cricket competition which carried List A status. There was formerly a women's team which occasionally played Women's One Day Internationals, but this team is now defunct. The grounds in this list have held one of the above-mentioned formats.

Official name (known as)	City or town	Capacity	Notes	Ref
Nykøbing Mors Cricket Club Ground	Nykøbing Mors	Unknown	Held twelve Women's One Day Internationals between 1989 and 1999	
Svanholm Park	Brøndby	Unknown	Held a single List A match when Denmark played Northamptonshire in the 2005 Cheltenham & Gloucester Trophy	
