= Godliman =

Godliman is a surname. Notable people with the surname include:

- Kerry Godliman (born 1973), British comedian and actor
- Mandie Godliman (born 1973), British cricketer
