= 2009 Women's Cricket World Cup final =

Cricket match

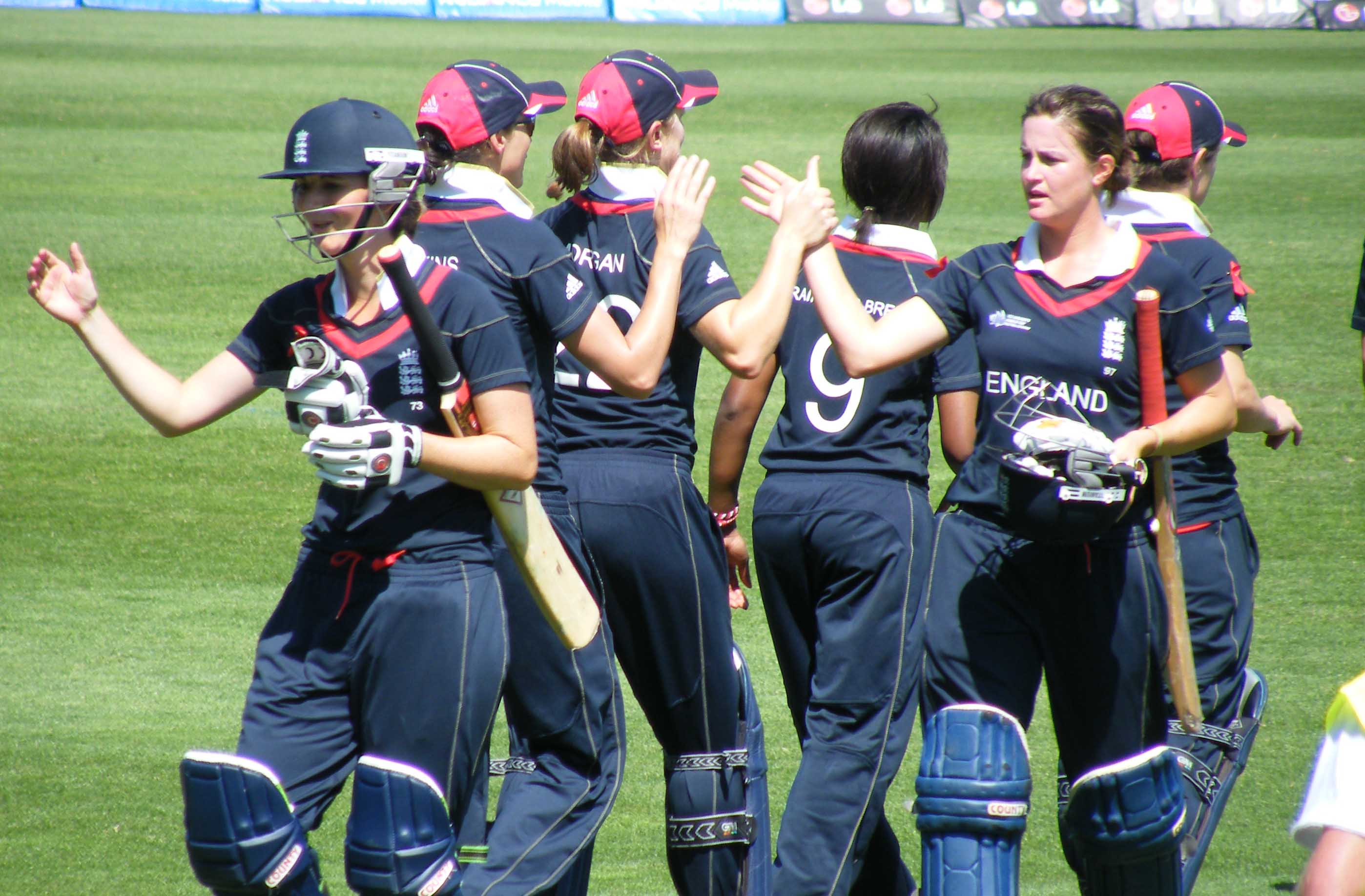
- The England team celebrating a win earlier in the tournament
- Event: 2009 Women's Cricket World Cup
New Zealand	England
(New Zealand)	(England)
166	167/6
47.2 overs	46.1 overs
- England won by 4 wickets
- Date: 22 March 2009
- Venue: North Sydney Oval, Sydney
- Player of the match: Nicky Shaw (Eng)
- Umpires: Steve Davis (Aus) and Brian Jerling (SA)
- Attendance: 2,300

The 2009 Women's Cricket World Cup final was a Women's One Day International match between the England women's cricket team and the New Zealand women's national cricket team, played on 22 March 2009 at the North Sydney Oval in Australia. It was the culmination of the 2009 Women's Cricket World Cup, the ninth edition of the tournament. England won the final by four wickets, clinching their third World Cup title and their first outside England. It was the second time that the two teams had met in a World Cup final; England won their previous final contest in 1993.

Both teams were unbeaten in the first group stage. In the second round, known as the Super Sixes, New Zealand and England finished first and second to qualify directly for the final; New Zealand had only lost to England, while England had already guaranteed their place in the final when they lost their last match to Australia, who were the defending champions. England were considered the favourites for the final. The New Zealand captain, Haidee Tiffen, won the toss, and opted to bat first. Her side were bowled out for 166 runs. The all-rounder Lucy Doolan, batting at number nine, was the highest scorer for New Zealand with 48. Nicky Shaw, one of England's bowlers, took a career-best four wickets for 34 runs. In their response, England built an opening partnership of 74 runs and continued to score steadily. Despite regularly losing wickets, they reached the winning total with 23 balls to spare, earning England their first World Cup title for 16 years. Shaw, who had initially not been in the England starting lineup, was named player of the match, having replaced the injured Jenny Gunn minutes before the game started.

== Background ==
The 2009 Women's Cricket World Cup was the ninth edition of the tournament, and the first to be organised by the International Cricket Council (ICC). (Note: The ICC took over administration of the women's game in 2005, when it merged with the International Women's Cricket Council (IWCC).) The first had been held in 1973, pre-dating the first men's Cricket World Cup by two years. The 2009 tournament included eight teams, six of which (Australia, England, India, New Zealand, Sri Lanka and the West Indies) qualified automatically due to finishing as the top six teams at the 2005 Women's Cricket World Cup, while the other two (Pakistan and South Africa) qualified through the 2008 Women's Cricket World Cup Qualifier. Matches, which consisted of 50 overs-per-side, took place at several cricket grounds in Australia between 7 and 22 March, featuring 25 matches over 16 days.

Although the ICC had successfully developed and expanded the women's game, from 15 member countries in 2005 to 42 in 2007, there was a growing gap between the top four teams—Australia, England, India and New Zealand—and the rest. In 2008, England and then Australia became the first teams to introduce contracts for some of their women's players; Charlotte Edwards, England's captain, said that this allowed the players to "commit to training without worrying about our jobs outside cricket." Before the competition, Jenny Roesler of Cricinfo suggested England and New Zealand, along with Australia, as the favourites to win the competition. Haidee Tiffen, the captain of New Zealand, said that she thought "Australia, New Zealand, England and India are of equal strength and any team can beat the other on its day. It is an open tournament with no clear-cut favourites." England's Claire Taylor said that she thought that Australia might struggle after losing key members of their 2005 World Cup-winning squad.

== Route to the final ==
=== Group stage ===
New Zealand were drawn in Group A of the competition, along with Australia, South Africa and the West Indies. They started their campaign against Australia. Tiffen scored a cautious half-century for New Zealand, but her dismissal triggered a collapse in which the team lost seven wickets for the addition of 34 runs. In their reply, Australia regularly lost wickets, and a six over bowling spell by medium pacer Kate Pulford, in which she took three wickets for 30 runs, slowed the run chase. After an initial rain delay held up the game, a second downpour finished the match, with Australia 13 runs short by the Duckworth–Lewis method. (Note: The Duckworth–Lewis method was introduced in 1997, and is a calculation used to set an adjusted target score in a match shortened by the weather. It was updated in 2014, and is now known as the Duckworth–Lewis–Stern (DLS) method.) Tiffen missed New Zealand's second match, against the West Indies, with an injury, and Aimee Mason deputised as captain. For the second time in as many matches, New Zealand suffered a collapse, losing their first six wickets for 104 runs. A seventh-wicket partnership of 57 between Mason and Sarah Tsukigawa helped New Zealand to remain competitive in the match, and they completed their 50 overs with 192 runs. According to Cricinfo, the West Indian reply "was devoid of momentum". Spin bowlers Mason and Lucy Doolan took three wickets apiece to limit the West Indies to 136 runs for the loss of eight wickets from their overs. In their final group stage match, a win over South Africa ensured that New Zealand won the group. Amy Satterthwaite, Sara McGlashan and Nicola Browne all scored half-centuries as their team reached a total of 250 for five. South Africa struggled in their chase: only Cri-Zelda Brits reached double figures in an innings dominated by the bowling of Mason and Suzie Bates, who collected four wickets each, helping New Zealand earn a 199-run victory.

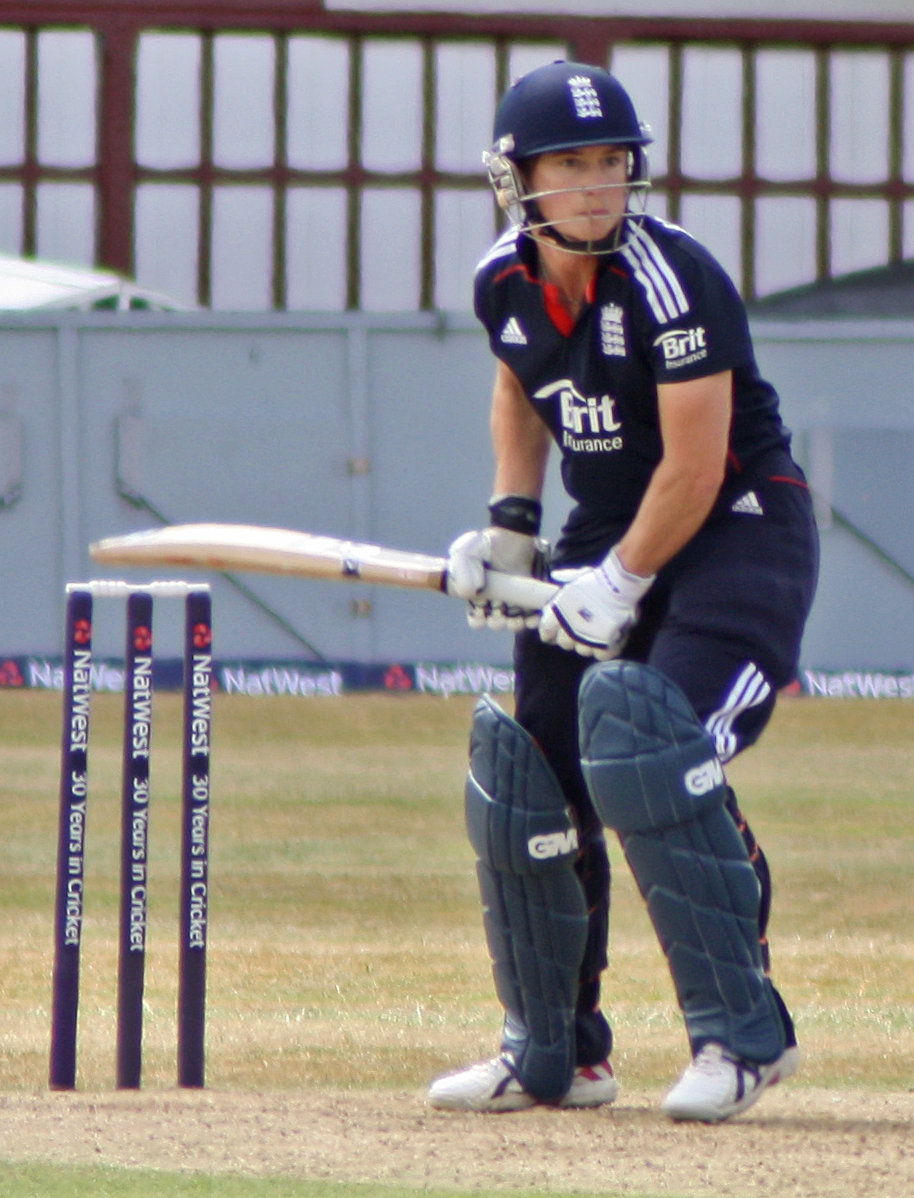
England's Claire Taylor finished the tournament as the leading run-scorer.

England were placed in Group B, alongside India, Pakistan and Sri Lanka. In their first contest, against Sri Lanka, they scored 277 runs, aided by a 95-ball century from Claire Taylor, and a half-century by Caroline Atkins. Sri Lanka batted their full allocation of overs, but lost by 100 runs. Laura Marsh took three wickets, and three of the Sri Lankan batters were run out in their chase. Following the match, Jenny Gunn's bowling action was reported to the ICC as being potentially illegal, (Note: The ICC defines an illegal bowling action as one "where a player is throwing rather than bowling the ball", due to an elbow extension in excess of 15 degrees before the ball is released.) but she was cleared a few days later. England faced India in their second match, in a contest billed as the battle for top spot in the group. England won the match easily, bowling India out for 169: Gunn and Holly Colvin each took three wickets, while both Atkins and Claire Taylor scored unbeaten half-centuries. Another large win, over Pakistan, guaranteed that England finished as group winners. Marsh took a career-best five wickets to help bowl Pakistan out for just 78 runs, a total which her side reached in less than half of their allowed overs.

=== Super Sixes ===
After the initial league stage, the bottom team from each group was eliminated, and the remaining teams progressed into the Super Sixes. During this stage, results and points from matches between the teams that had qualified were carried over, and each team played a further three matches, against those teams that had advanced from the other group. England and New Zealand met each other in the first match of the Super Sixes. England batted first, and despite being 96 for four at one stage, 57 runs from Edwards, and a rapid 22 runs from Gunn, helped their side recover to post a total of 201 for five. In response, New Zealand began positively, and were boosted by a half-century from their captain, Tiffen, but the spin bowling of Edwards, Marsh and Colvin controlled the run rate, and New Zealand were eventually bowled out for 170, Edwards taking four wickets. England's following match was against the West Indies, and they once again surpassed 200 runs after batting first. Sarah Taylor, Claire Taylor and Atkins all scored half-centuries to propel England to their total of 236 for eight. The English bowlers then dismissed the West Indies for 90 runs, Marsh collecting three wickets. The win secured England a place in the final, irrespective of the result of their final Super Sixes match against Australia.

After losing their first Super Sixes match to England, New Zealand faced an Indian side which had beaten Australia in their first Super Six contest. India batted first and scored 207, during an innings in which they lost four batters to run outs. New Zealand began their response well, putting on a partnership of 78 runs for the first wicket between Pulford and Tiffen. After Tiffen's dismissal, Bates supported Pulford, who eventually fell for 71 runs, and New Zealand reached their target with 14 balls to spare. New Zealand set a record partnership for the second wicket in women's ODIs in their final match: Bates scored 168 and Tiffen 100 as the pair put on 262 runs together. Bates played an aggressive innings, scoring her runs from 105 balls, including 6 sixes and 19 fours. New Zealand reached 373 from their overs, and bowled Pakistan out for 150, earning themselves a 223-run victory, and qualifying for the final. England were outplayed by Australia in their final Super Six match: Shelley Nitschke slowed the run rate during her bowling, taking two wickets and restricting England to just 14 runs from her 10 overs. England were bowled out for 161, a total Australia chased down within 34 overs. England's loss to Australia ended a 17-match unbeaten run.

== Build-up ==
The final was a repeat of the 1993 tournament, when England won at Lord's. Both sides had won the World Cup previously, but only when hosting the tournament. New Zealand achieved the feat in 2000, while England were winners in both 1973 and 1993. As well as losing the 1993 final to England, New Zealand were also finalists in 1997, losing to Australia in India. England had contested five previous finals; losing to Australia in subsequent tournaments in 1978, 1982 and 1988. Huw Richards, writing for the International Herald Tribune, described both England and New Zealand as worthy finalists, and noted that he was disappointed with the performance of Australia, who finished fourth. Simon Wilde of The Times cited England as favourites: "In Edwards they have the ICC player of the year, in Claire Taylor the No 1-ranked batsman and in Isa Guha the No 1 bowler." The New Zealand Herald's Mark Geenty concurred that England were favourites, describing them as "the form side of recent years". England had beaten New Zealand in their most recent four matches, including their victory over them during the Super Sixes stage of the competition. New Zealand's coach, Gary Stead, said that his team would aim to play their normal "aggressive style of play and although that may be a bit more high risk, I think it's the style that we play best."

After the Australian team was knocked out, local press coverage for the match diminished; only three journalists attended the pre-game press conference for the final. A reporter for the BBC, Alison Mitchell, said that in the Australian newspapers, "the nationals and even most of the locals I flicked through on Saturday carried nothing except one slim column". The 2009 World Cup was the first to be televised globally; ESPN Star Sports provided coverage from seven matches, including the final. As well as being available on television, the matches were streamed on the ESPN Star Sports website. The match was also broadcast on the radio; Australian Broadcasting Corporation (ABC) and the BBC provided joint coverage.

England all-rounder Gunn aggravated a calf strain during the warm-up, and 10 minutes before the start was replaced by the team's vice-captain, Nicky Shaw.

== Match ==
=== Summary ===
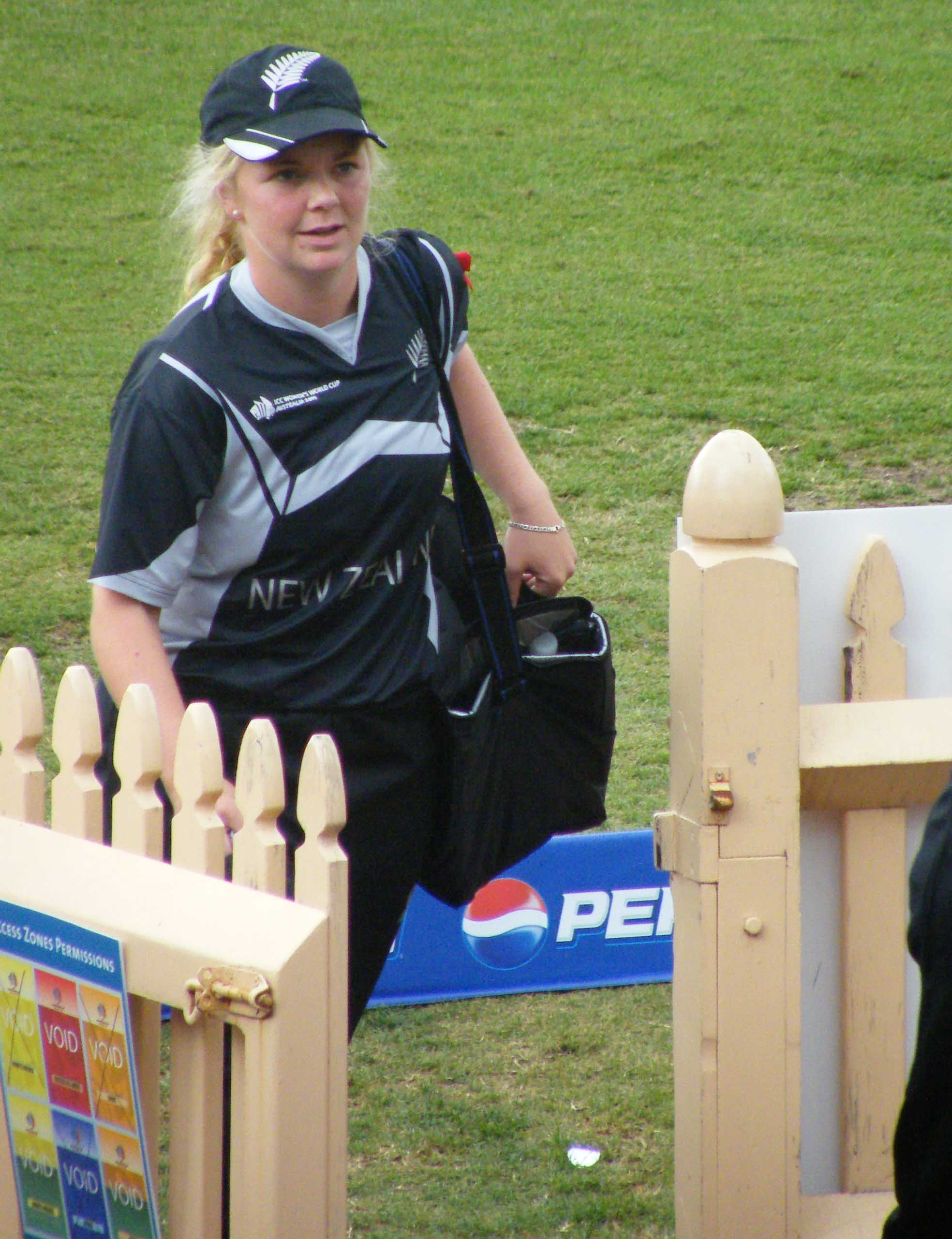
Lucy Doolan was New Zealand's best performer with both bat and ball.

The final was played on a fine day at the North Sydney Oval, a multi-purpose stadium in North Sydney, New South Wales. The ground had hosted matches earlier in the tournament, and during the 1988 Women's Cricket World Cup, but, as of 2020, has not hosted men's international cricket. Played in front of a crowd of 2,300, the match began at 10:00 AEDT (23:00 GMT), with a scheduled lunch interval from 13:10 to 13:55. Steve Davis, of Australia, and the South African Brian Jerling were appointed as the on-field umpires for the match. Davis was a member of the Elite Panel of ICC Umpires, the highest designation for an umpire, while Jerling was on the International Panel of Umpires and Referees, the next most senior designation. Tyron Wijewardene and Jeff Brookes fulfilled the off-field roles of third and fourth umpires respectively, and Brian Aldridge served as match referee. Aldridge had previously umpired the 1992 Cricket World Cup Final.

Despite conditions conducive to swing bowling, New Zealand's captain, Tiffen, chose to bat first after winning the toss. England opened the bowling with Katherine Brunt and Isa Guha. Brunt's bowling spell was described by the BBC's Aimee Lewis as "superb", and teammate Shaw credited her with putting the New Zealand batters under pressure. The New Zealand opening batters, Pulford and Tiffen, put on 26 runs together before Pulford was caught by Claire Taylor off the bowling of Guha, having scored 8 runs. According to Roesler, players on both teams showed some early nerves: Tiffen played some uncertain shots, while Guha bowled some wide deliveries. New Zealand progressed to 46 for one before England made their first bowling change. The England vice-captain, Shaw, was brought on, and made an immediate impact. In her first over, Bates attempted a loft over mid-on, and was caught by Atkins. The following ball, Satterthwaite fell for a duck, edging a delivery to the wicket-keeper, Sarah Taylor, leaving New Zealand 49 for three. Four overs later, Tiffen was also dismissed by Shaw, caught behind by Sarah Taylor. McGlashan was described by Lewis as looking "in fine touch", but after scoring 21 runs from 20 deliveries, she was caught at mid-wicket by Greenway off the bowling of Colvin. After 20 overs, New Zealand were 74 for five, their most prolific batters of the tournament having been dismissed. Marsh subsequently bowled Mason for 13, while Tsukigawa edged a delivery from Brunt for 2: New Zealand's innings collapsed to 101 for seven. Doolan joined Browne at the crease, and the pair helped to recover the innings somewhat: Doolan scored 48 runs in a partnership of 63 to help New Zealand to their total of 166. After the dismissal of Doolan, who was stumped off a wide delivery, New Zealand subsided rapidly, losing their final two wickets for just two more runs. The New Zealand Herald criticised the batting as being "indifferent", while Richards credited England for their "tight bowling and fielding" to restrict New Zealand.

Simon Briggs of The Daily Telegraph described the start of England's chase as being "smooth and confident": opening batters Atkins and Sarah Taylor built a partnership larger than any managed by New Zealand, scoring 74 runs. Taylor was the first batter out, caught by Tiffen at mid-wicket from the off-spin bowling of Doolan for 39 runs. Claire Taylor came to the crease upon Sarah Taylor's dismissal and played with a similar attacking intent, striking four boundaries during her 21 runs before she was bowled by Mason, with England 109 for two. Atkins played a patient innings, and scored the most runs for her side, accruing 40 from 85 balls, eventually being caught by Sophie Devine from the bowling of Dooley. England's middle order suffered their own collapse against the spin bowling of Doolan and Mason; their scoring rate slowing significantly from 4.78 runs per over at the end of the fourteenth over to 3.58 twenty overs later. Edwards became Dooley's third wicket when she was given out after being caught by wicket-keeper Rachel Priest for 10 runs, though Cricinfo suggested that she had not actually hit the ball. Despite their struggles through the middle overs, Richards opined that "England never looked like losing." Greenway and Morgan were both dismissed for single-figure totals: Greenway had survived an early appeal when she was caught after the ball had hit her pads, but was later caught by Satterthwaite off the bowling of Mason for eight runs, to leave England on 139 for five; Morgan was the victim of a what Lewis described as a "sloppy run out" shortly thereafter, moving the score to 149 for six. It was Shaw who once again galvanised England, batting with a more attacking style than those that had struggled before her. Her score of 17 not out pushed England towards the winning target, and a single from Colvin secured victory for England with 23 balls remaining in the innings. Shaw's contribution earned her the player of the match accolade.

=== Scorecard ===
New Zealand batting innings
Batter	Method of dismissal	Runs	Balls	Strike rate
Kate Pulford	c Claire Taylor b Isa Guha	8	23	34.78
Haidee Tiffen *	c Sarah Taylor † b Nicky Shaw	30	56	53.57
Suzie Bates	c Caroline Atkins b Nicky Shaw	2	7	28.57
Amy Satterthwaite	c Sarah Taylor † b Nicky Shaw	0	1	0.00
Sara McGlashan	c Lydia Greenway b Holly Colvin	21	20	105.00
Aimee Mason	b Laura Marsh	13	18	72.22
Nicola Browne	lbw b Nicky Shaw	25	78	32.05
Sarah Tsukigawa	c Sarah Taylor † b Katherine Brunt	2	18	11.11
Lucy Doolan	st Sarah Taylor † b Laura Marsh	48	57	84.21
Sophie Devine	lbw b Charlotte Edwards	0	5	0.00
Rachel Priest †	not out	0	1	0.00
Extras	(2 leg byes, 15 wides)	17		
Totals	(47.2 overs)	166	3.50 runs per over	

England bowling
Bowler	Overs	Maidens	Runs	Wickets	Economy
Katherine Brunt	10	3	33	1	3.30
Isa Guha	5	0	24	1	4.80
Nicky Shaw	8.2	0	34	4	4.08
Holly Colvin	10	1	26	1	2.60
Laura Marsh	10	3	34	2	3.40
Charlotte Edwards	4	1	13	1	3.25

England batting innings
Batter	Method of dismissal	Runs	Balls	Strike rate
Sarah Taylor †	c Haidee Tiffen b Lucy Doolan	39	45	86.66
Caroline Atkins	c Sophie Devine b Lucy Doolan	40	85	47.05
Claire Taylor	b Aimee Mason	21	30	70.00
Charlotte Edwards *	c Rachel Priest † b Lucy Doolan	10	19	52.63
Lydia Greenway	c Amy Satterthwaite b Aimee Watkins	8	34	23.52
Beth Morgan	run out	9	27	33.33
Nicky Shaw	not out	17	27	62.96
Holly Colvin	not out	5	10	50.00
Extras	(1 leg bye, 17 wides)	18		
Totals	(46.1 overs)	167/6	3.61 runs per over	
Did not bat: Laura Marsh, Katherine Brunt, Isa Guha

New Zealand bowling
Bowler	Overs	Maidens	Runs	Wickets	Economy
Sophie Devine	9	0	30	0	3.33
Kate Pulford	3	0	17	0	5.66
Nicola Browne	7	1	24	0	3.42
Suzie Bates	4.1	0	21	0	5.04
Lucy Doolan	10	4	23	3	2.30
Sarah Tsukigawa	4	1	23	0	5.75
Aimee Mason	9	0	28	2	3.11

Match officials

- On-field umpires: Steve Davis and Brian Jerling
- Third umpire: Tyron Wijewardene
- Match referee: Brian Aldridge
- Reserve umpire: Jeff Brookes

Key

- * – Captain
- † – Wicket-keeper
- c Fielder – Indicates that the batter was dismissed by a catch by the named fielder
- b Bowler – Indicates which bowler gains credit for the dismissal
- lbw – Indicates the batter was dismissed leg before wicket
- st – Indicates the batter was stumped

== Aftermath ==
England received US$45,000 from the ICC for winning the tournament, while New Zealand received $25,000. Shaw, who had not expected to play, said after the match; "I started the day crying, I finished it crying, but we won a World Cup in between". New Zealand's captain, Tiffen, reflected after the match, "Maybe there were some nerves in amongst the camp. We didn't hype it up to be anything more than another day at the office, unfortunately it was a bad day at the office." The team of the tournament included seven finalists: England's Edwards was selected as captain, and was joined by teammates Brunt, Marsh, Claire Taylor and Sarah Taylor. Bates and Pulford represented New Zealand in the team, while Devine was named as the team's twelfth woman. Claire Taylor, who finished the tournament as the leading run-scorer, was named as the player of the tournament. The month after the final, Taylor became the first woman to be selected as one of Wisden's Cricketers of the Year. Both Taylor and Edwards were awarded MBEs for their services to cricket; Edwards received hers in the 2009 Birthday Honours, while Taylor's came in the 2010 New Year Honours.

The England team flew back to the United Kingdom in economy class; Mitchell highlighted the contrast with the England men's team, who regularly flew business class. They held a reception at Lord's in London upon their return, but the former sports minister, Richard Caborn, lamented the low-key celebrations, saying that "I would have a Number 10 reception, a reception at the House of Commons, and, at the appropriate time, in the Lords." In her history of women's cricket, Rafaelle Nicholson was critical of some of the reporting on the final, saying that "coverage increasingly appears to compare women's cricket with the men's game, and to treat the male version as 'real cricket'". The English journalists Simon Wilde and Lawrence Booth credited the contracts introduced in 2008 as being critical to England's success. Booth highlighted the contrast with New Zealand's captain, Tiffin, who had retired after the World Cup, claiming: "If I was paid properly, I'd still be playing."

The two sides met again three months later to contest the final of the 2009 Women's World Twenty20, which England also won. Each of the top four in the 2009 tournament automatically qualified for the 2013 Women's Cricket World Cup. Neither England nor New Zealand reached the final of that tournament, but instead met in the third-place playoff, which England won by four wickets.
