= Laura Harper =

Laura Harper may refer to:

- Laura Harper (cricketer)
- Laura Harper (basketball)
