= Bev Nicholson =

Bev Nicholson may refer to:

- Bev Nicholson (cricketer) (born 1975), English cricketer
- Bev Hartigan (born 1967), English runner who competed as Bev Nicholson
