= Ella Donnison =

English cricketer (born 1975)

Personal information
- Full name: Ella Louise Donnison
- Born: 27 February 1975 (age 51); Nottingham, England
- Batting: Right-handed
- Role: Wicket-keeper

International information
- National side: England (1999)
- ODI debut (cap 79): 19 July 1999 v Netherlands
- Last ODI: 21 July 1999 v Ireland

Domestic team information
- Years: Team
- 1990–1999: East Midlands
- 2000–2004: Nottinghamshire

Career statistics
Competition	WODI	WFC	WLA
Matches	3	2	89
Runs scored	34	89	1,396
Batting average	11.33	29.66	22.88
100s/50s	0/0	0/1	0/4
Top score	19	72	94*
Balls bowled	–	–	171
Wickets	–	–	8
Bowling average	–	–	14.25
5 wickets in innings	–	–	0
10 wickets in match	–	–	–
Best bowling	–	–	2/15
Catches/stumpings	3/2	0/–	26/12
- Source: CricketArchive, 8 March 2021

Ella Louise Donnison (born 27 February 1975) is an English former cricketer who played as a wicket-keeper and right-handed batter. She appeared in three One Day Internationals for England at the 1999 Women's European Cricket Championship at Nykøbing Mors Cricket Club Ground, Denmark in July 1999. She scored 34 runs and took three catches and two stumpings as England won the tournament. She was also captain for all three matches. She also represented England at under-20, under-21 and under-23 levels. She played domestic cricket for East Midlands and Nottinghamshire.
