= Barry Lloyd (cricketer) =

Welsh cricketer

Personal information
- Full name: Barry John Lloyd
- Born: 6 September 1953; Neath, Glamorgan, Wales
- Died: 1 December 2016 (aged 63)
- Batting: Right-handed
- Bowling: Right-arm offbreak
- Relatives: HJ Lloyd (daughter)

Domestic team information
- Years: Team
- 1972-1984: Glamorgan

Career statistics
Competition	First-class	List A
Matches	147	95
Runs scored	1631	422
Batting average	11.90	12.41
100s/50s	0/0	0/0
Top score	48	32
Balls bowled	20511	3662
Wickets	247	64
Bowling average	41.02	38.06
5 wickets in innings	3	0
10 wickets in match	0	0
Best bowling	8/70	4/26
Catches/stumpings	87/0	24/0
- Source: Cricinfo, 24 December 2025

Barry John Lloyd (6 September 1953 – 1 December 2016) was a Welsh cricketer.

Barry Lloyd was born in Neath, Glamorgan, Wales and educated at Bangor Normal School. He was a right-handed batsman and a right-arm off-break bowler who represented Glamorgan between 1972 and 1984 and the Wales Minor Counties XI in 1993. He captained Glamorgan in 1982 and also was awarded his county cap during the same season.

In 147 first-class matches, he scored 1,631 runs (average 11.90) and took 247 wickets (average 41.02) with a personal best of 8/70. In 95 List A matches, he scored 422 runs (average 12.41) and took 64 wickets (average 38.06) with a personal best of 4/26.

His daughter Hannah Lloyd is an ODI cricketer for the England Women XI and has also represented Somerset, West of England, Diamonds and Central Districts.
