= Andrea van de Broeke =

Dutch cricketer

Personal information
- Full name: Andrea van de Broeke
- Role: Batter

International information
- National side: Netherlands (1998)
- Only ODI (cap 46): 26 July 1998 v Denmark

Career statistics
Competition	WODI
Matches	1
Runs scored	1
Batting average	1.00
100s/50s	0/0
Top score	1
Catches/stumpings	0/–
- Source: CricketArchive, 12 June 2021

Andrea van de Broeke is a Dutch former cricketer who played as a batter. She appeared in one One Day International for the Netherlands in July 1998, against Denmark. Batting at number 7, she scored 1 run in a 62 run defeat.
