= Lene Vilsgaard =

Danish cricketer

Personal information
- Full name: Lene Vilsgaard
- Role: Bowler

International information
- National side: Denmark
- ODI debut (cap 32): 19 July 1999 v Ireland
- Last ODI: 21 July 1999 v Netherlands

Career statistics
Competition	WODI
Matches	3
Runs scored	3
Batting average	–
100s/50s	0/0
Top score	3*
Balls bowled	174
Wickets	3
Bowling average	28.66
5 wickets in innings	0
10 wickets in match	0
Best bowling	2/30
Catches/stumpings	1/0
- Source: ESPNcricinfo, 28 September 2020

Lene Vilsgaard is a former women's cricketer for the Denmark women's national cricket team who played three ODIs during the 1999 Women's European Cricket Championship. In all, she scored three runs and took three wickets for Denmark.
