= Eva Christensen =

Danish cricketer

Personal information
- Full name: Eva Christensen

International information
- National side: Denmark
- ODI debut (cap 31): 26 July 1998 v Netherlands
- Last ODI: 21 July 1999 v Netherlands

Career statistics
Competition	WODI
Matches	3
Runs scored	13
Batting average	13.00
100s/50s	0/0
Top score	6*
Balls bowled	30
Wickets	2
Bowling average	17.00
5 wickets in innings	0
10 wickets in match	0
Best bowling	2/34
Catches/stumpings	0/0
- Source: ESPNcricinfo, 28 September 2020

Eva Christensen is a former cricketer for the Denmark women's national cricket team who played three ODIs. She made her debut against the Netherlands in 1998, and played two matches during the 1999 Women's European Cricket Championship. She took her only international wickets in the 1999 match against England, while her highest score was made on her debut, when she scored 6 not out. In all, she scored 13 runs and took two wickets for Denmark.
