= Sciver-Brunt =

Sciver-Brunt is a surname. Notable people with the surname include:

- Katherine Sciver-Brunt (born 1985), English cricketer
- Nat Sciver-Brunt (born 1992), English cricketer
