= Heidi Pico =

Danish cricketer

Personal information
- Full name: Heidi Pico

International information
- National side: Denmark
- Only ODI (cap 30): 25 July 1998 v Netherlands

Career statistics
Competition	WODI
Matches	1
Runs scored	1
Batting average	1.00
100s/50s	0/0
Top score	1
Catches/stumpings	0/0
- Source: ESPNcricinfo, 28 September 2020

Heidi Pico is a former cricketer for the Denmark national women's cricket team who played one ODI, against the Netherlands in 1998. Pico scored one run and did not bowl in the match.
