= Kirstie White =

English cricketer

Personal information
- Full name: Kirstie Elizabeth White
- Born: 14 March 1988 (age 38); Southampton, Hampshire, England
- Batting: Right-handed
- Bowling: Right-arm medium
- Role: Batter; occasional wicket-keeper

Domestic team information
- Years: Team
- 2002–2008: Hampshire
- 2012–2024: Surrey
- 2017: Surrey Stars
- 2020–2024: South East Stars
- 2022: Oval Invincibles

Career statistics
Competition	WLA	WT20
Matches	98	68
Runs scored	2,099	1,074
Batting average	26.91	20.26
100s/50s	0/15	0/4
Top score	98*	74*
Balls bowled	60	–
Wickets	3	–
Bowling average	20.00	–
5 wickets in innings	0	–
10 wickets in match	0	–
Best bowling	3/17	–
Catches/stumpings	49/24	21/8
- Source: CricketArchive, 18 October 2024

Kirstie Elizabeth White (born 14 March 1988) is an English former cricketer who played as a right-handed batter and occasional wicket-keeper. She played for Hampshire, Surrey and South East Stars, as well as for Surrey Stars in the Women's Cricket Super League and Oval Invincibles in The Hundred.

== Early life ==
White was born on 14 March 1988 in Southampton.

== Domestic career ==
White made her county debut in 2002, for Hampshire against Essex, scoring 25* in a 79 run victory. She played for Hampshire regularly until 2006, and played one match in 2008, before taking a four-year break from the game. She returned to county cricket in 2012, now playing for Surrey. In 2016 she was the leading run-scorer across the whole County Championship, scoring 337 runs at an average of 48.14. She also achieved her List A high score that season, scoring 98* against Sussex. Two seasons later, in 2018, she helped Surrey to promotion to Division 1 of the County Championship, and was the third leading run-scorer across the whole competition, with 331 runs at an average of 47.28. She played seven matches for the side in 2021, making 121 runs in the Twenty20 Cup at an average of 24.20. She played five matches in the 2022 Women's Twenty20 Cup, scoring 54 runs.

White also played for Surrey Stars in the Women's Cricket Super League in 2017. She had previously been named in the Stars squad for the 2016 season, but withdrew due to an ankle injury. In 2017, she played two matches, batting once and scoring five runs.

In 2020, White played for South East Stars in the Rachael Heyhoe Flint Trophy. She appeared in three matches, scoring 65 runs at an average of 21.66. She scored 50 against Western Storm. She was ever-present for the side in the Rachael Heyhoe Flint Trophy, scoring 124 runs with a top score of 73, against Northern Diamonds. She also played three matches in South East Stars' victorious Charlotte Edwards Cup campaign. She played seven matches for South East Stars in 2022, across the Charlotte Edwards Cup and the Rachael Heyhoe Flint Trophy, scoring 47 runs. She also played three matches for Oval Invincibles in The Hundred, scoring ten runs in two innings. She was included in the South East Stars squad for the 2023 and 2024 seasons, but did not play a match in either season.

White also played in the Super Fours between 2004 and 2006, and hit her maiden List A half-century in the 2005 competition, scoring 51* for Braves. White was also part of the England Development Squad that won the 2005 European Championship.

At the end of the 2024 season, White announced her retirement from cricket.
