= V. M. Gupte =

Indian cricket umpire

Personal information
- Full name: V. M. Gupte

Umpiring information
- ODIs umpired: 2 (1999)
- WODIs umpired: 1 (2002)
- Source: Cricinfo, 18 May 2014

V. M. Gupte is a former Indian cricket umpire. Having umpired mainly at the first-class level, he has only officiated in two international fixtures, both of them One Day Internationals, in 1999.

== See also ==
- List of One Day International cricket umpires
