= Kath Wilkins =

English cricketer (born 1976)

Personal information
- Full name: Kathryn Mary Wilkins
- Born: 17 May 1976 (age 50); Bristol, England
- Batting: Right-handed
- Bowling: Right-arm off break
- Role: All-rounder

International information
- National side: England (1999)
- ODI debut (cap 87): 19 July 1999 v Netherlands
- Last ODI: 21 July 1999 v Ireland

Domestic team information
- Years: Team
- 1991–1999: West
- 2000–2003: Somerset

Career statistics
Competition	WODI	WFC	WLA
Matches	3	2	68
Runs scored	66	52	1,174
Batting average	22.00	26.00	22.15
100s/50s	0/0	0/0	1/5
Top score	27	34*	111
Balls bowled	115	108	3,146
Wickets	4	0	55
Bowling average	7.75	–	25.67
5 wickets in innings	0	0	1
10 wickets in match	–	0	–
Best bowling	2/4	–	6/36
Catches/stumpings	0/–	0/–	23/–
- Source: CricketArchive, 7 March 2021

Kathryn Mary Wilkins (born 17 May 1976) is an English former cricketer who played as an all-rounder. She was a right-handed batter and right-arm off break bowler. She appeared in three One Day Internationals for England in July 1999, scoring 66 runs and taking four wickets. She also represented England at under-21 and under-23 levels. She played domestic cricket for West of England and Somerset.

Sporting positions
Preceded by None	Somerset women's cricket captain 2000–2001	Succeeded by Hannah Lloyd
