= K. D. Singh Babu Stadium, Lucknow =

Sports venue in Lucknow, India

Coordinates: 26°51′20″N 80°56′16″E

K. D. Singh Babu Stadium
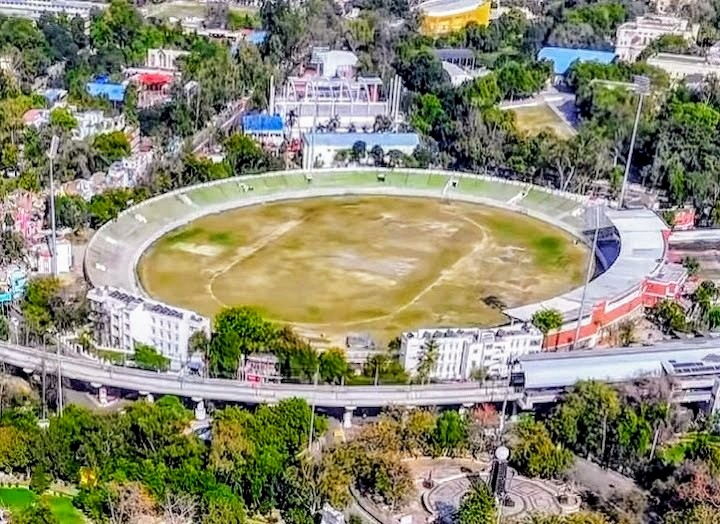
- An aerial view of the stadium with the elevated metro station
- Interactive map of K. D. Singh Babu Stadium

Ground information
- Location: Parivartan Chowk, Hazratganj, Lucknow, India
- Country: India
- Establishment: 1957; 69 years ago
- Capacity: 25,000
- Owner: Government of Uttar Pradesh
- Operator: Inter Kashi FC
- End names
- Pavilion End; Gomati End

International information
- Only men's Test: 18–22 January 1994: India v Sri Lanka
- Only men's ODI: 27 October 1989: Pakistan v Sri Lanka
- First women's Test: 21–23 November 1976: India v West Indies
- Last women's Test: 14–17 January 2002: India v England
- First women's ODI: 5 December 1995: India v England
- Last women's ODI: 1 December 2005: India v England

Team information
Inter Kashi FC	(2025-present)
Indian National football Team	(2025-present)
Lucknow Super Division
- As of 8 December 2019; Source: K. D. Singh Babu Stadium, ESPNcricinfo

K. D. Singh Babu Stadium, formerly known as the Central Sports Stadium, is a multi-purpose stadium named after the famous hockey player K. D. Singh. The stadium was built in 1957 and it is located in the Hazratganj area of Lucknow. The metro station lies towards the south-west of the stadium. It has a seating capacity of 25,000.

== Records ==
=== Cricket ===
K.D. Singh Babu Stadium has hosted following international matches:

- in 1989, the MRF World Series (Nehru Cup) tournament, where Pakistan beat Sri Lanka by six runs. Imran Khan was the man of the match. This also happens to be the only ODI ever played on this ground.
- in 1993/94 season, the first Test of Sri Lanka's tour of India where India won by an innings and 119 runs. This was also the last international match played by Men's national side on this ground. India won the toss and chose to bat. Nayan Mongia made his debut and Anil Kumble was the man of the match. Even though this was a 5-day test, 4th day of the test match (21 January 1994) was opted as a rest day and no play was held.
- in women's cricket, the first test started on 21 November 1976; the last test was played on 14 January 2002. The first women's ODI was played on 5 December 1995; the last ODI was played on 1 December 2005.

In Women's cricket, England's opening batters Caroline Atkins and Arran Brindle (aka Arran Thompson) have broken the world record for an opening partnership for England by putting 150 on the board without loss at the end of the first day of the first Test against India in this stadium.

In test, the highest score was made by India, scoring 511 all out followed by Sri Lanka 218 all out. The next highest score was also made by Sri Lanka scoring 174 all out. The most runs scored here was by Sachin Tendulkar (142), followed by Navjot Sidhu (124) and Roshan Mahanama (118). The most wickets taken here was by Anil Kumble (11), followed by Muttiah Muralitharan (5) and Venkatapathy Raju (3).

The highest scores were made by Pakistan, scoring 219–6 in ODIs. The next highest scores were made by Sri Lanka who scored 213 all out. The most runs scored here was by Imran Khan (84), followed by Aravinda de Silva (83) and Hashan Tillakaratne (71). Wasim Akram, Abdul Qadir and Akram Reza have taken 2 wickets on this ground in ODIs.

== See also ==
- BRSABV Ekana Cricket Stadium
- List of Test cricket grounds
- One-Test wonder
- List of stadiums in India
- Lists of stadiums
