= Nykøbing Mors Cricket Club Ground =

Cricket ground in Nykøbing Mors, Denmark

Coordinates: 56°47′34.56″N 08°52′32.97″E

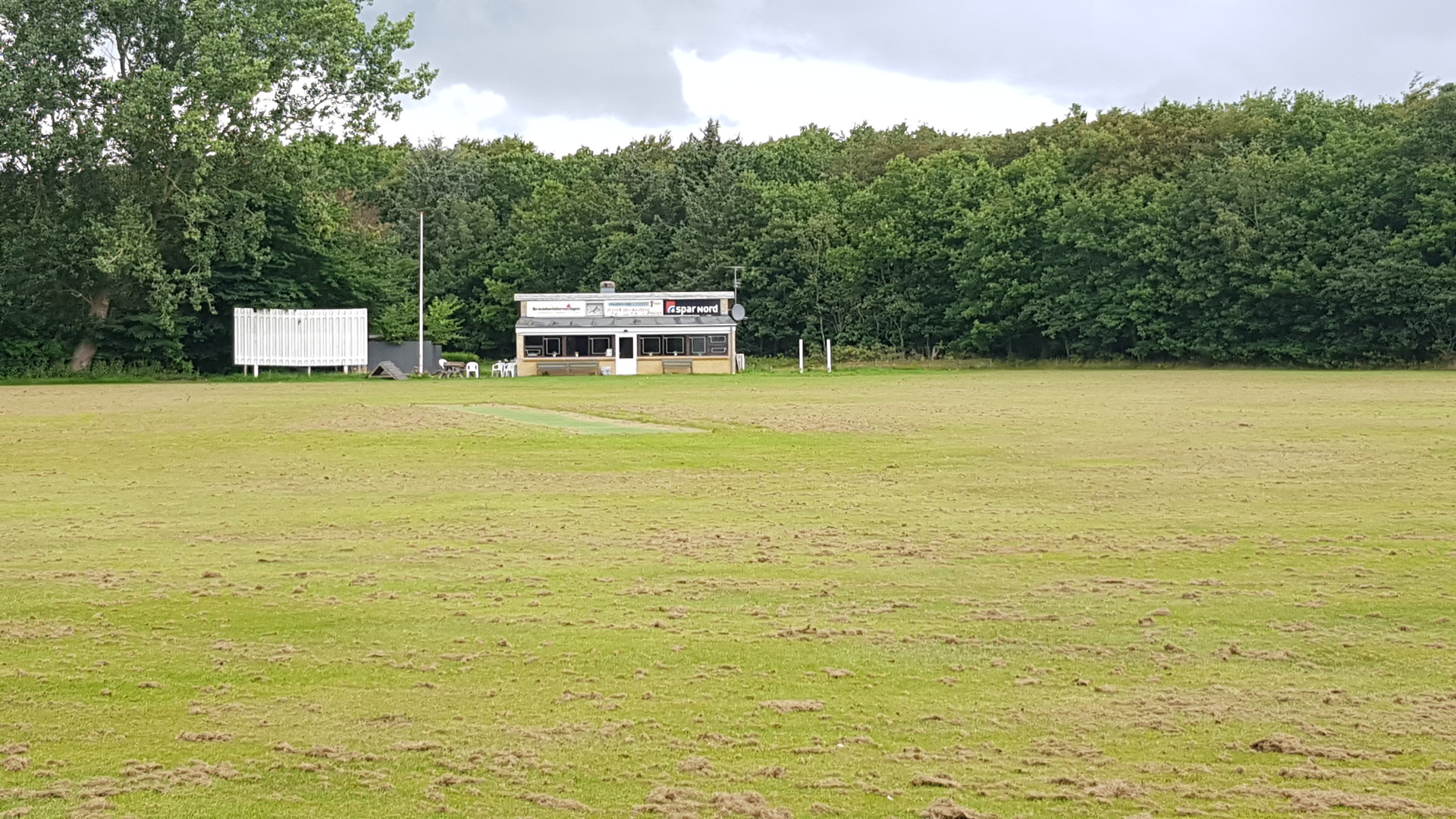

Ground information
- Location: Nykøbing Mors, Denmark
- Establishment: 1989 (first recorded match)

International information
- First WODI: 19 July 1989: Denmark v Ireland
- Last WODI: 21 July 1999: England v Ireland

Team information
Denmark	(1989–1999)
- As of 3 September 2020; Source: CricketArchive

Nykøbing Mors Cricket Club Ground is a cricket ground in Nykøbing Mors, Denmark. The first recorded match held on the ground came in 1989 when Denmark played Ireland in a One Day International in the 1989 Women's European Cup. Six One Day International matches were held at the ground during that tournament, and a further six when Denmark hosted the 1999 Women's European Championship.

The ground has also held a number of international youth cricket tournaments. It is the home ground of Nykøbing Mors Cricket Club.
