= Kate Lowe =

English cricketer (born 1975)

Personal information
- Full name: Katherine Lowe
- Born: 2 August 1975 (age 51); Nottingham, Nottinghamshire, England
- Batting: Right-handed
- Bowling: Right-arm medium
- Role: Batter

International information
- National side: England (1999–2002)
- Test debut (cap 131): 24 June 2001 v Australia
- Last Test: 14 January 2002 v India
- ODI debut (cap 84): 19 July 1999 v Netherlands
- Last ODI: 9 January 2002 v India

Domestic team information
- Years: Team
- 1991–1999: East Midlands
- 2000–2006: Nottinghamshire

Career statistics
Competition	WTest	WODI	WFC	WLA
Matches	3	8	4	77
Runs scored	60	105	66	712
Batting average	12.00	17.50	9.42	16.55
100s/50s	0/0	0/1	0/0	0/4
Top score	23	57*	23	57*
Balls bowled	–	–	49	447
Wickets	–	–	1	14
Bowling average	–	–	38.00	18.50
5 wickets in innings	–	–	0	1
10 wickets in match	–	–	–	–
Best bowling	–	–	1/38	5/15
Catches/stumpings	0/–	1/–	1/–	14/–
- Source: CricketArchive, 14 March 2021

Katherine Lowe (born 2 August 1975) is an English former cricketer who played as a right-handed batter. She appeared in 3 Test matches and 8 One Day Internationals for England between 1999 and 2002. She played domestic cricket for East Midlands and Nottinghamshire.
