= Helen Wardlaw =

English cricketer (born 1982)

Personal information
- Full name: Helen Anna Wardlaw
- Born: 11 October 1982 (age 44); Dewsbury, Yorkshire, England
- Batting: Right-handed
- Bowling: Right-arm off break
- Role: Bowler
- Relatives: Iain Wardlaw (brother)

International information
- National side: England (2002–2004)
- Test debut (cap 135): 14 January 2002 v India
- Last Test: 20 August 2002 v South Africa
- ODI debut (cap 100): 8 January 2002 v India
- Last ODI: 22 February 2004 v South Africa

Domestic team information
- Years: Team
- 2000–2007: Yorkshire

Career statistics
Competition	WTest	WODI	WFC	WLA
Matches	3	7	4	64
Runs scored	56	39	56	320
Batting average	18.66	9.75	14.00	9.69
100s/50s	0/0	0/0	0/0	0/0
Top score	36	29	36	29
Balls bowled	741	252	939	2,752
Wickets	8	7	17	62
Bowling average	33.12	26.42	19.05	23.56
5 wickets in innings	0	0	1	1
10 wickets in match	0	0	0	0
Best bowling	3/35	2/27	6/33	5/37
Catches/stumpings	2/–	3/–	2/–	20/–
- Source: CricketArchive, 27 February 2021

Helen Wardlaw (born 11 October 1982) is an English former cricketer who played for Yorkshire between 2000 and 2007. A right-handed batter and right-arm off break bowler, she made her international debut for England in 2002, and played in three Test matches and seven One Day Internationals.

In March 2013, she relocated to Melbourne, Australia. She umpired for the Bendigo District Cricket Association in 2017. More recently she was working as a police constable in Daylesford, Victoria.
