= Leanne Davis =

English cricketer (born 1985)

Personal information
- Full name: Leanne Clare Davis
- Born: 26 April 1985 (age 41); Rochdale, England
- Batting: Right-handed
- Bowling: Right-arm medium-fast
- Role: Bowler

International information
- National side: England (2000–2001)
- ODI debut (cap 90): 1 July 2000 v South Africa
- Last ODI: 10 August 2001 v Scotland

Domestic team information
- Years: Team
- 1999–2006: Lancashire
- 2007/08–2008/09: South Australia
- 2009/10: Australian Capital Territory

Career statistics
Competition	ODI	LA	T20
Matches	2	90	13
Runs scored	–	307	18
Batting average	–	9.30	4.50
100s/50s	–	0/0	0/0
Top score	–	26*	10
Balls bowled	42	3,167	270
Wickets	1	66	10
Bowling average	20.00	29.31	25.70
5 wickets in innings	0	1	0
10 wickets in match	0	0	0
Best bowling	1/12	5/19	2/10
Catches/stumpings	0/–	26/–	3/–
- Source: CricketArchive, 5 October 2025

Leanne Clare Davis is an English former international cricketer notable for being the youngest player, male or female, to represent the national side. In total she played two One Day Internationals for the England women's cricket team. She is currently based in Australia.

== Early life ==
Davis was born in Rochdale, Greater Manchester on 26 April 1985. She spent her early years in the nearby suburban town of Milnrow.

== Domestic career ==
Davis played county cricket for Lancashire between 1999 and 2006, helping them to promotions in 1999 and 2003. She took her maiden five-wicket haul against Somerset in 2000. She also played for V Team and Braves in the Super Fours competition.

After moving to Australia, she played for South Australia for two seasons before spending a season with Australian Capital Territory.

In 2009 Davis was a member of the winning West Torrens Eagles, a women's A grade team who won the premiership by beating arch rivals Sturt in the final.

== International career ==
Davis made her international debut in an ODI against South Africa at New Road, Worcester on 1 July 2000 at the age of just 15 years, 66 days. This made her the youngest cricketer, male or female, to play for England, a record which stands to this day. She made one further international appearance in an ODI against Scotland on 10 August 2001. Across her two matches, she took one wicket at an average of 20.
