= Rosalie Birch =

English cricketer (born 1983)

Personal information
- Full name: Rosalie Anne Birch
- Born: 6 December 1983 (age 42); St Albans, Hertfordshire, England
- Nickname: Cheesy
- Batting: Right-handed
- Bowling: Right-arm off break
- Role: All-rounder

International information
- National side: England (2003–2008)
- Test debut (cap 139): 7 August 2003 v South Africa
- Last Test: 15 February 2008 v Australia
- ODI debut (cap 101): 13 August 2003 v South Africa
- Last ODI: 24 February 2008 v New Zealand
- ODI shirt no.: 21
- T20I debut (cap 1): 5 August 2004 v New Zealand
- Last T20I: 1 February 2008 v Australia

Domestic team information
- Years: Team
- 2000–2011: Sussex Women
- 2012–2016: Devon Women
- 2016: Western Storm

Career statistics
Competition	WTest	WODI	WT20I	WLA
Matches	7	37	4	185
Runs scored	158	301	27	3,307
Batting average	17.55	15.05	6.75	23.96
100s/50s	0/1	0/0	0/0	3/11
Top score	62	46*	11	107*
Balls bowled	860	1,342	48	3,957
Wickets	13	46	5	122
Bowling average	30.15	18.04	7.80	19.00
5 wickets in innings	0	1	0	3
10 wickets in match	0	0	0	0
Best bowling	3/57	5/50	4/27	5/25
Catches/stumpings	4/–	7/–	1/–	63/–
- Source: CricketArchive, 27 February 2021

Rosalie Anne Birch (born 6 December 1983) is an English former cricketer who played as a right-arm off break bowler and right-handed lower middle order batter. She appeared in 7 Test matches, 37 One Day Internationals and 4 Twenty20 Internationals for England between 2003 and 2008. She was part of the England team that won the Ashes in 2005 and retained them in 2008.

Domestically, Birch played for Sussex and later for Devon. She was also named in Western Storm's squad for the inaugural Women's Cricket Super League in 2016 but did not make an appearance.

From 2003, Birch combined her cricketing career with full-time study at the University of Sussex. She graduated with a BA in linguistics in 2006.
