= Lucy Pearson (cricketer) =

English cricketer (born 1972)

Personal information
- Full name: Lucy Charlotte Pearson
- Born: 19 February 1972 (age 54); Kings Lynn, Norfolk, England
- Batting: Right-handed
- Bowling: Left-arm fast-medium
- Role: Bowler

International information
- National side: England (1996–2005)
- Test debut (cap 124): 12 July 1996 v New Zealand
- Last Test: 21 August 2004 v New Zealand
- ODI debut (cap 76): 15 July 1998 v Australia
- Last ODI: 1 April 2005 v New Zealand
- Only T20I (cap 8): 5 August 2004 v New Zealand

Domestic team information
- Years: Team
- 1992: Thames Valley
- 1994–1998: East Anglia
- 2001–2004: Staffordshire

Career statistics
Competition	WTest	WODI	WT20I	WLA
Matches	12	62	1	124
Runs scored	33	71	–	407
Batting average	4.12	3.08	–	7.40
100s/50s	0/0	0/0	–	0/0
Top score	18*	22*	–	45
Balls bowled	2,194	3,026	24	6,265
Wickets	30	68	1	145
Bowling average	29.36	22.97	23.00	20.73
5 wickets in innings	1	0	0	1
10 wickets in match	1	0	0	0
Best bowling	7–51	3/14	1/23	5/28
Catches/stumpings	3/–	10/–	0/–	24/–
- Source: CricketArchive, 14 March 2021

Lucy Charlotte Pearson (born 19 February 1972) is a teacher and former English cricketer who played 12 Women's Test matches and 62 Women's One Day Internationals. Pearson also played in the inaugural Women's Twenty20 International, taking one wicket against New Zealand.

A left-arm fast-medium opening bowler, her best performance was against Australia, taking 7–51 in the first innings of the second Test in 2003, winning the Player of the Match award for match figures of 58–21–107–11, becoming only the second English woman to take 11 wickets against Australia in over 70 years. As a result, Pearson was named (2003) Women's Player of the Year for the second time, having taken the inaugural award in 2000. She was also nominated 2005. After guiding England to the semi-finals of the 2005 Women's Cricket World Cup in South Africa, Pearson was forced to retire with a recurrence of the stress fracture to her ankle that forced her to miss most of the 2002 season.

Pearson read English at Keble College, Oxford University, where she also played hockey. She spent three and a half years as Head of Sixth Form at Solihull School, where she sang in the school choir and coached the cricket and hockey XIs. In 2006, she took up a post as Deputy Head of Wellington College, also teaching English and she is a member of the cricket coaching team. She was the Head of Cheadle Hulme School, which she joined in September 2010. In September 2017, Pearson announced that she would step down from this role at the end of August 2018, joining The Football Association as Director of Education.

In 2016 Pearson was appointed to the Board of the ECB as the Director responsible for women's cricket. She left the Board in May 2023.

In November 2025, she was announced as the next head of her alma mater, Oakham School.
