= Bev Nicholson (cricketer) =

English cricketer (born 1975)

Personal information
- Full name: Beverley Nicholson
- Born: 4 June 1975 (age 51); Doncaster, South Yorkshire, England
- Batting: Right-handed
- Bowling: Right-arm medium
- Role: All-rounder

International information
- National side: England (1996–1999)
- ODI debut (cap 72): 18 Jun 1996 v New Zealand
- Last ODI: 21 July 1999 v Ireland

Domestic team information
- Years: Team
- 1992–2005: Yorkshire

Career statistics
Competition	WODI	WFC	WLA	WT20
Matches	6	1	65	5
Runs scored	53	7	601	23
Batting average	17.66	3.50	14.30	7.66
100s/50s	0/0	0/0	0/1	0/0
Top score	34	4	86	11
Balls bowled	72	103	1,447	57
Wickets	0	1	40	6
Bowling average	–	92.00	17.50	8.33
5 wickets in innings	0	0	0	0
10 wickets in match	–	0	–	–
Best bowling	–	1/92	4/23	4/12
Catches/stumpings	1/–	1/–	26/–	0/–
- Source: CricketArchive, 9 March 2021

Beverley Nicholson (born 4 June 1975) is an English former cricketer who played as an all-rounder. She was a right-handed batter and right-arm medium bowler. She appeared in six One Day Internationals (ODIs) for England, making her debut against New Zealand in June 1996. She was included in England's 1997 Women's Cricket World Cup squad, playing in two matches. Overall she scored 53 runs at an average of 17.66 in her six ODIs. She played county cricket for Yorkshire.
