= Laura Harper (cricketer) =

English cricketer

Personal information
- Full name: Laura Julyen Harper
- Born: 22 January 1984 (age 42); Plymouth, Devon, England
- Batting: Right-handed
- Bowling: Right-arm off break
- Role: All-rounder

International information
- National side: England (1999–2005)
- Test debut (cap 129): 24 June 2001 v Australia
- Last Test: 21 November 2005 v India
- ODI debut (cap 80): 19 July 1999 v Netherlands
- Last ODI: 1 December 2005 v India

Domestic team information
- Years: Team
- 1999: West
- 2000–2006: Somerset
- 2008–2009: Cornwall

Career statistics
Competition	WTest	WODI	WLA	WT20
Matches	6	25	102	6
Runs scored	182	197	1,867	72
Batting average	22.75	15.15	26.29	14.40
100s/50s	0/0	0/0	1/13	0/0
Top score	31	41	101	40*
Balls bowled	1,026	1,087	4,492	84
Wickets	11	33	117	4
Bowling average	35.63	16.30	19.39	17.50
5 wickets in innings	1	1	1	0
10 wickets in match	0	0	0	0
Best bowling	5/66	5/12	5/12	3/13
Catches/stumpings	3/–	5/–	30/–	1/–
- Source: CricketArchive, 28 February 2021

Laura Julyen Harper (born 22 January 1984) is an English former cricketer who played as a right-handed batter and right-arm off break bowler. She appeared in 6 Test matches and 25 One Day Internationals for England between 1999 and 2005. She played domestic cricket for West, Somerset and Cornwall. At the time of her debut, she was the youngest player to have played for England.

== Early life ==
Harper started playing cricket aged eight and began bowling off spin at ten. She played with Cornwall boys under-11s and progressed through the age groups, touring South Africa in 1997. She was selected for an England boys under-15 trial but chose to play for Somerset in the Women's County Championship instead.

She earned her first international call-ups whilst studying for her GCSE examinations at Truro School and played whilst studying A-levels at Truro College, Cornwall.

== Domestic career ==
She played county cricket for Somerset from 2000 to 2006 and Cornwall from 2008 to 2009. She also appeared in the Super Fours, for Braves, Super Strikers and Emeralds.

== International career ==
She made her Test cricket debut against Australia at Shenley in 2001 and last appeared against India in Delhi in 2005. In six Test matches she scored 182 runs and took 11 wickets, with best innings figures of five wickets for 66.

She played 25 One Day Internationals (ODIs), scoring 195 runs and taking 33 wickets. She made her One Day International debut against the Netherlands in 1999 in the Women's European Championships at the age of 15 and won the player of the match award after taking 5/12, her best ODI bowling figures. She played in the World Cup in New Zealand in December 2000.
