= Hannah Lloyd =

Welsh cricketer (born 1979)

Hannah Knight
Personal information
- Full name: Hannah Jayne Knight
- Born: 25 August 1979 (age 47); Neath, Glamorgan, Wales
- Batting: Right-handed
- Bowling: Right-arm medium
- Role: All-rounder
- Relatives: Barry Lloyd (father)

International information
- National side: England (1999–2003)
- ODI debut (cap 83): 19 July 1999 v Netherlands
- Last ODI: 17 August 2003 v South Africa

Domestic team information
- Years: Team
- 1996–1999: West
- 2000–2009: Somerset
- 2003/04: Central Districts

Career statistics
Competition	WODI	WFC	WLA	WT20
Matches	5	2	130	7
Runs scored	23	41	2,877	108
Batting average	5.75	10.25	25.68	15.42
100s/50s	0/0	0/0	3/10	0/0
Top score	14	31	136*	32
Balls bowled	–	60	2,676	–
Wickets	–	0	75	–
Bowling average	–	–	22.02	–
5 wickets in innings	–	0	3	–
10 wickets in match	–	0	–	–
Best bowling	–	–	5/24	–
Catches/stumpings	3/–	1/–	40/–	0/–
- Source: CricketArchive, 8 March 2021

Hannah Jayne Knight (née Lloyd; born 25 August 1979) is a Welsh former cricketer who played as an all-rounder.

== Biography ==
She was a right-handed batter and right-arm medium bowler. She appeared in five One Day Internationals for England. She made her debut against the Netherlands in July 1999 and played her last match against South Africa in August 2003. She also represented England at under-17, under-21 and under-23 levels. She played domestic cricket for West of England from 1996 to 1999 and then for Somerset between 2000 and 2009. She also played for Central Districts in the 2003–04 State League. She is the daughter of the late Glamorgan cricketer Barry Lloyd.

Sporting positions
Preceded by Kath Wilkins	Somerset women's cricket captain 2002–2008	Succeeded by Steph Davies
