= Laura MacLeod =

English cricketer

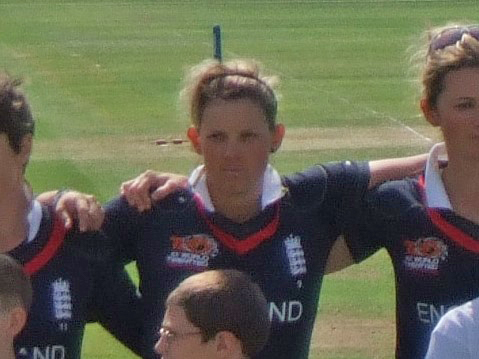
- Laura MacLeod, Director of Women's Cricket, Central Sparks

Personal information
- Full name: Laura Kelly MacLeod
- Born: 27 November 1977 (age 48); Nantwich, Cheshire, England
- Batting: Right-handed
- Bowling: Right-arm medium Right-arm off break
- Role: All-rounder

International information
- National side: England (1997–2007)
- Test debut (cap 126): 15 July 1999 v India
- Last Test: 29 August 2006 v India
- ODI debut (cap 74): 27 August 1997 v South Africa
- Last ODI: 5 March 2007 v India
- T20I debut (cap 7): 5 August 2004 v New Zealand
- Last T20I: 5 August 2006 v India

Domestic team information
- Years: Team
- 1995–1997: Lancashire and Cheshire
- 1999–2000: Cheshire
- 2002: Staffordshire
- 2003–2006: Lancashire
- 2008–2009: Cheshire
- 2016: Cheshire
- 2016: Lancashire Thunder

Career statistics
Competition	WTest	WODI	WT20I	WLA
Matches	13	73	3	170
Runs scored	448	1,324	32	3,802
Batting average	21.33	20.68	10.66	25.17
100s/50s	1/2	0/9	0/0	2/24
Top score	103	79	24	162*
Balls bowled	925	1,369	24	5,323
Wickets	12	19	0	110
Bowling average	33.91	51.21	–	30.54
5 wickets in innings	0	0	–	2
10 wickets in match	0	0	–	0
Best bowling	1/10	2/17	–	5/22
Catches/stumpings	13/–	27/–	2/–	68/–
- Source: CricketArchive, 20 February 2021

Laura Kelly MacLeod (was Newton; 27 November 1977) is an English former cricketer who played as a right-handed batter and off break bowler. She appeared in 13 Test matches, 73 WODIs and 3 WT20Is games for the English women's cricket team. She played domestic cricket for Lancashire and Cheshire, Cheshire, Staffordshire, Lancashire and Lancashire Thunder.

MacLeod was born in Nantwich, Cheshire. She made her one-day international debut in 1997 against South Africa and her Test debut in 1999 against India before touring Australia. She scored one test century and nine one day half centuries. MacLeod developed over her career from a middle order batter to an opener. She took 12 test wickets and 19 in one day internationals, changing bowling styles from medium pace to off spin over time.

MacLeod was part of the 2005 Ashes winning squad before retiring from the international game in May 2007.

In January 2026, she joined Nantwich Cricket Club and became head coach of the women’s team, Nantwich Vipers.

== Post-playing career ==
Cricket Administration

Since retiring as a player, MacLeod has held a number of roles in the sport including Regional Growth Executive (England & Wales Cricket Board), Head of Women's and Girls Pathway (Warwickshire County Cricket Club), Chair of the MCC Women's Cricket Committee and currently Director of Women's Cricket (Central Sparks).

Following the announcement by the England & Wales Cricket Board (ECB) of the new Tier 1 Counties within the women's domestic game, Warwickshire have announced that MacLeod will lead their new Bears Women professional side.
