= Salliann Briggs =

English cricketer and coach

Personal information
- Full name: Salliann Briggs
- Born: 3 February 1984 (age 42); Grimsby, England
- Batting: Right-handed
- Bowling: Right-arm medium
- Role: Batter

Domestic team information
- Years: Team
- 2001–2013: Yorkshire

Career statistics
Competition	WLA	WT20
Matches	121	30
Runs scored	2,355	395
Batting average	21.80	17.17
100s/50s	1/8	0/0
Top score	177	44
Balls bowled	23	24
Wickets	1	0
Bowling average	30.00	–
5 wickets in innings	0	0
10 wickets in match	0	0
Best bowling	1/14	–
Catches/stumpings	33/–	5/–
- Source: CricketArchive, 29 August 2022

Salliann Beams (née Briggs; born 3 February 1984) is an English former cricketer who played over 100 times in limited overs cricket in England, primarily for Yorkshire. After retiring, she worked as part of the England women development programme, in connection with the under-19s, and also worked as the head coach at Loughborough University and Loughborough Lightning.

In March 2018, Briggs was named as the head coach for the WBBL Hobart Hurricanes and the WNCL Tasmanian Tigers. During her tenure at the Hurricanes, Briggs has coached the team to finish last (2018–19), second last (2019–20) and last (2020–21) on the WBBL ladder.
