= Clare Connor =

English cricketer

Clare Connor CBE
Personal information
- Full name: Clare Joanne Connor
- Born: 1 September 1976 (age 50); Brighton, East Sussex, England
- Batting: Right-handed
- Bowling: Slow left-arm orthodox
- Role: All-rounder

International information
- National side: England (1995–2005)
- Test debut (cap 120): 10 December 1995 v India
- Last Test: 24 August 2004 v Australia
- ODI debut (cap 69): 19 July 1995 v Denmark
- Last ODI: 1 September 2005 v Australia
- ODI shirt no.: 1
- T20I debut (cap 2): 5 August 2004 v New Zealand
- Last T20I: 2 September 2005 v Australia

Domestic team information
- Years: Team
- 1991–2008: Sussex
- 2004/05: Central Districts

Career statistics
Competition	WTest	WODI	WT20I	WLA
Matches	16	93	2	209
Runs scored	502	1,087	15	3,718
Batting average	20.08	16.46	15.00	21.87
100s/50s	0/1	0/5	0/0	1/18
Top score	61	85*	9*	114
Balls bowled	2,061	3,580	36	8,855
Wickets	24	80	0	217
Bowling average	27.91	26.01	–	19.64
5 wickets in innings	1	1	–	3
10 wickets in match	0	0	–	0
Best bowling	5/65	5/49	–	5/8
Catches/stumpings	7/–	25/–	2/–	73/–
- Source: CricketArchive, 12 March 2021

Clare Joanne Connor CBE (born 1 September 1976) is an English former cricketer who batted right-handed and bowled slow left arm spin. She held the presidency of Marylebone Cricket Club from 2021 until 2022. She made her England One Day International debut in 1995 and played her first Test match that winter. She achieved a hat-trick against India in 1999 and captained England from 2000 until her retirement from international cricket in 2006.

She is currently managing director of Women's Cricket for the England and Wales Cricket Board (ECB).

== Early life and career ==
Connor was born on 1 September 1976 in Brighton, East Sussex, England. She was a pupil at Brighton College. She studied English at the University of Manchester, and graduated with a Bachelor of Arts (BA) degree in 1998. During her time at Manchester, Clare was a resident at Hulme Hall.

Connor taught English, PSHE and PE at Brighton College while heading up their PR operations, and also spent time working for Channel 4.

== Cricket career ==
Connor first came to prominence by captaining the U16 at Preston Nomads, a leading club side in Sussex. The youth manager, Malcolm Reid, was responsible for this appointment and the move was supported by the club. She also played for the Brighton College boys' team a little before her England career began. She has also appeared in The Cricketer Cup (in 2002), the first woman ever to do so. In 2004/05 she captained the England side to the semi-finals of the 2005 Women's World Cup in South Africa, and that winter also played state cricket for Central Districts Women in New Zealand.

In 2006, she became the first woman to play for the all-star charity side, Lashings World XI.

== Honours ==
In the 2004 Queen's Birthday Honours, Connor was appointed a Member of the Order of the British Empire (MBE) "for services to Women's Cricket". In the 2006 New Year Honours, she was promoted to Officer of the Order of the British Empire (OBE) "for services to Cricket"; at the same time, the men's winning Ashes Team also received honours. As the current director of English women's cricket, following the team's success in winning the 2017 World Cup she was promoted to Commander of the Order of the British Empire (CBE) in the 2018 New Year Honours, again for services to cricket.

On 24 June 2020, Connor was announced as the next President of the Marylebone Cricket Club. She assumed the office on 1 October 2021, replacing Kumar Sangakkara, whose term was extended for a year due to the COVID-19 pandemic. She also became the first woman to be appointed as the President of MCC in the 233 years of MCC club's history.
