= Jackie Hawker =

English cricketer (born 1981)

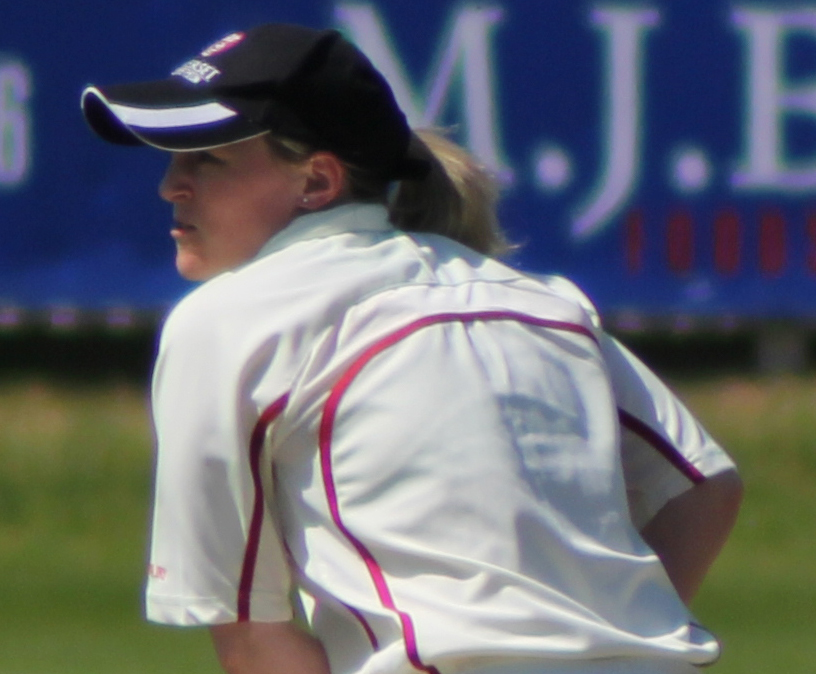

Personal information
- Full name: Jacqueline Louise Hawker
- Born: 21 February 1981 (age 45); Plymouth, Devon, England
- Batting: Right-handed
- Bowling: Right-arm medium
- Role: All-rounder

International information
- National side: England (1999–2002)
- Only Test (cap 134): 14 January 2002 v India
- ODI debut (cap 81): 19 July 1999 v Netherlands
- Last ODI: 24 January 2002 v India

Domestic team information
- Years: Team
- 1993–1999: West
- 2000–2018: Somerset

Career statistics
Competition	WTest	WODI	WLA	WT20
Matches	1	7	193	33
Runs scored	13	32	1,435	146
Batting average	13.00	5.33	10.62	8.11
100s/50s	0/0	0/0	0/3	0/0
Top score	13	16	68*	26
Balls bowled	24	24	5,171	337
Wickets	0	0	131	19
Bowling average	–	–	25.23	16.73
5 wickets in innings	–	–	1	1
10 wickets in match	–	–	0	0
Best bowling	–	–	5/16	5/6
Catches/stumpings	0/–	1/–	50/–	6/–
- Source: CricketArchive, 27 February 2021

Jacqueline Louise Hawker (born 21 February 1981) is an English former cricketer who played as a right-handed batter and right-arm medium bowler. She appeared in one Test match and seven One Day Internationals for England between 1999 and 2002. She made her international debut against the Netherlands on 19 July 1999 and made her final appearance for England on 24 January 2002 against India. Prior to her full-international call-up, Hawker played for England under-19s at the age of 14, and later scored 56 runs for the England 'A' team against India in 1999. She played domestic cricket for West of England and Somerset.
