= Mandie Godliman =

English cricketer (born 1973)

Personal information
- Full name: Mandie Claire Godliman
- Born: 5 April 1973 (age 53); Eton, Buckinghamshire, England
- Batting: Right-handed
- Role: Wicket-keeper

International information
- National side: England (2002–2003)
- Only Test (cap 136): 14 August 2002 v India
- ODI debut (cap 99): 6 January 2002 v India
- Last ODI: 2 February 2003 v Australia

Domestic team information
- Years: Team
- 1990–1999: Thames Valley
- 2000–2005: Sussex
- 2002/03–2004/05: Wellington
- 2005/06–2006/07: Canterbury
- 2007/08: Northern Districts
- 2009/10–2011/12: Canterbury

Career statistics
Competition	WTest	WODI	WLA	WT20
Matches	1	11	201	35
Runs scored	66	50	4,860	443
Batting average	66.00	7.14	27.15	20.13
100s/50s	0/1	0/0	3/34	0/0
Top score	65	14	139	48
Balls bowled	–	–	395	–
Wickets	–	–	10	–
Bowling average	–	–	26.80	–
5 wickets in innings	–	–	0	–
10 wickets in match	–	–	0	–
Best bowling	–	–	3/7	–
Catches/stumpings	2/0	6/2	68/34	10/11
- Source: CricketArchive, 12 February 2021

Mandie Claire Godliman (born 5 April 1973) is an English former cricketer. She made one Test and 11 One Day International appearances for England between 2002 and 2003. She played domestic cricket for Thames Valley, Sussex, Wellington, Canterbury and Northern Districts.
