= Arran Brindle =

English cricketer

Personal information
- Full name: Arran Brindle
- Born: 23 November 1981 (age 44); Steeton, West Yorkshire, England
- Batting: Right-handed
- Bowling: Right-arm medium
- Role: All-rounder

International information
- National side: England (1999–2014)
- Test debut (cap 133): 24 June 2001 v Australia
- Last Test: 10 January 2014 v Australia
- ODI debut (cap 88): 20 July 1999 v Denmark
- Last ODI: 26 January 2014 v Australia
- T20I debut (cap 12): 2 September 2005 v Australia
- Last T20I: 2 February 2014 v Australia

Domestic team information
- Years: Team
- 1998–2011: Lancashire
- 2011–2014: Sussex
- 2016–2018: Southern Vipers

Career statistics
Competition	WTest	WODI	WT20I	WLA
Matches	11	88	35	202
Runs scored	551	1,928	373	5,440
Batting average	30.61	27.94	23.31	35.55
100s/50s	1/3	1/11	0/0	4/34
Top score	101*	107*	42*	128*
Balls bowled	78	1,032	453	4,455
Wickets	0	35	22	141
Bowling average	–	22.17	17.45	17.23
5 wickets in innings	–	0	0	2
10 wickets in match	–	0	0	0
Best bowling	–	3/0	3/11	6/30
Catches/stumpings	5/–	40/–	13/–	95/–
- Source: CricketArchive, 7 March 2021

Arran Brindle (née Thompson; born 23 November 1981) is an English former cricketer who played as an all-rounder. She was a right-handed batter and right-arm medium bowler. She appeared in 11 Test matches, 88 One Day Internationals and 35 Twenty20 Internationals for England between 1999 and 2014. She played county cricket for Lancashire and Sussex, and played in the Women's Cricket Super League for the Southern Vipers.

== Early life ==
Brindle was born on 23 November 1981 in Steeton, West Yorkshire. After completing her A-Levels in 2000, Brindle studied Sports Science at the University of Sheffield.

== Domestic career ==
Brindle began playing cricket against boys at under 12 level in Lancashire and also played club cricket in the Lincolnshire Men's Premier League for Louth CC. She became the first woman to score a century in men's Premier League cricket as she scored 128 for her team against Market Deeping CC on 21 May 2011. In May 2021, she along with her twelve-year-old son Harry Brindle put on an unbeaten opening century run stand partnership (143*) batting together playing for the Owmby CC Trojans team in a men's club cricket match against the Nettleham CC Academy in the Lincoln and District League Division 3. Arran ended up unbeaten on 94 while her son remained unbeaten on 32 as Owmby Trojans chased a small target of 141 by a margin of ten wickets. It was also the first instance where a mother and son registered 100 run partnership for opening wicket in a men's club cricket game.

== International career ==
She made her WODI debut under her maiden name Thompson at the age of 18 against Denmark on 20 July 1999 during the 1999 Women's European Cricket Championship which was held in Denmark.

In January 2002, Brindle and Caroline Atkins shared a partnership of 200 against India at K. D. Singh Babu Stadium, Lucknow, which was at the time a record for the first wicket in women's Test cricket. Brindle scored 101*, her only Test century, against Australia at Hove in the 2005 Women's Ashes and her knock eventually turned out to be a match saving knock as England drew the test match. She ended the 2005 Women's Ashes as the leading runscorer with 199 runs in 2 matches as England secured 1-0 historic Ashes series victory over Australia, as England won the second test by 6 wickets to register their first test win against Australia after December 1984. The win was also turned out to be England's first successful attempt in regaining the Ashes after 42 years.

In 2006, Brindle took a break from top-level cricket to spend more time with her family. She returned to the international fold in 2011 when she was picked in the England squad for the summer's ODIs and T20Is. She was also part of the England side which defeated Australia in the final of the 2011 NatWest Women's T20 Quadrangular Series by 16 runs. During her comeback return to England side for the 2011 NatWest Quadrangular series, she was hailed as a resident mother figures by her teammates and her son Harry was adopted as an unofficial team mascot whenever Arran played for England at international level.

She scored her maiden one day international century – an unbeaten 107 – against South Africa at Senwes Park, Potchefstroom in October 2011. She was also part of the England team which won the one-off Ashes test against Australia in January 2014 at Perth whereas she also ended up as the leading runscorer in the one-off test with 103 runs. It also turned out to be her last test match of her career. She retired from international cricket in February 2014 at the age of 32.

== After cricket ==
Brindle is now a teacher and coach at Greenwich House Independent School.
