= Caroline Atkins =

English cricketer (born 1981)

Caroline Foster
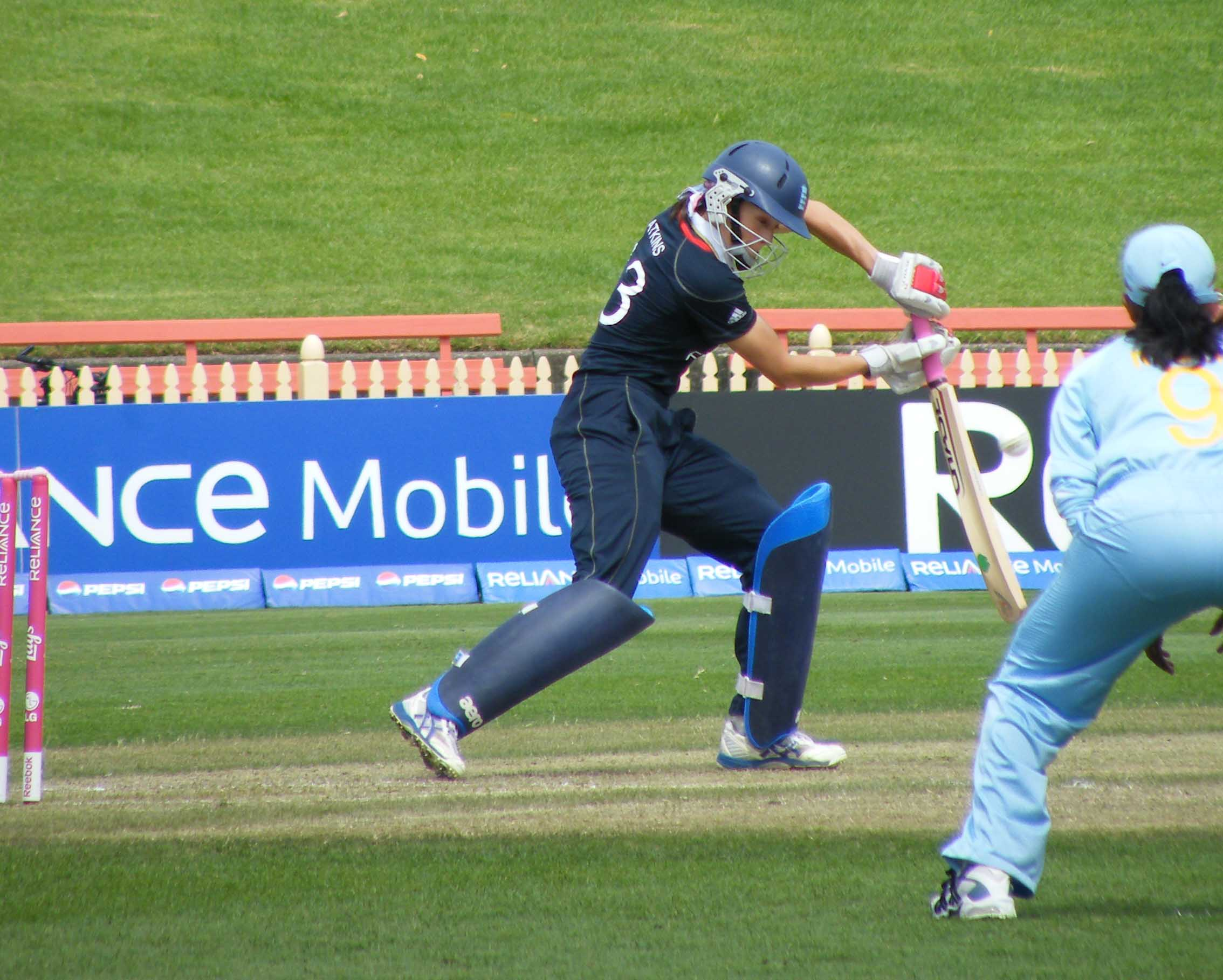

Personal information
- Full name: Caroline Mary Ghislaine Foster
- Born: 13 January 1981 (age 45); Burgess Hill, West Sussex, England
- Batting: Right-handed
- Bowling: Right-arm medium
- Role: Batter

International information
- National side: England (2001–2011)
- Test debut (cap 128): 24 June 2001 v Australia
- Last Test: 22 January 2011 v Australia
- ODI debut (cap 91): 3 July 2001 v Australia
- Last ODI: 26 February 2010 v India
- T20I debut (cap 16): 5 August 2006 v India
- Last T20I: 18 January 2011 v Australia

Domestic team information
- Years: Team
- 1996–2012: Sussex
- 2003/04–2004/05: South Australia
- 2013–2014: Somerset

Career statistics
Competition	WTest	WODI	WT20I	WLA
Matches	9	58	19	227
Runs scored	357	1,291	56	5,374
Batting average	21.00	30.02	5.60	33.17
100s/50s	0/3	1/6	0/0	3/34
Top score	90	145	20*	145
Balls bowled	90	6	–	2,286
Wickets	1	0	–	57
Bowling average	44.00	–	–	24.68
5 wickets in innings	0	–	–	0
10 wickets in match	0	–	–	0
Best bowling	1/9	–	–	4/19
Catches/stumpings	5/–	14/–	2/–	83/–
- Source: CricketArchive, 7 March 2021

Caroline Mary Ghislaine Foster (née Atkins; born 13 January 1981) is an English cricket coach and former player. She was a right-handed batter and right-arm medium bowler who appeared in 9 Test matches, 58 One Day Internationals and 19 Twenty20 Internationals for England between 2001 and 2011. She primarily played county cricket for Sussex before ending her career with Somerset. She also spent two Women's National Cricket League seasons with South Australia.

== Early life ==
Foster was born on 13 January 1981 in Burgess Hill, West Sussex. She attended Burgess Hill Girls, an all-girls private school. She attended Hild Bede College at Durham University, where she was the first woman cricketer in the Durham University Centre of Cricketing Excellence, graduating in 2002. While at Durham, she was part of the women's team that won the BUSA cricket championship for the first time and played for the men's team against Cardiff UCCE, as well as being selected for the England squad against Australia in 2001.

== International career ==
In January 2002, Foster and Arran Brindle shared a partnership of 200 against India at K. D. Singh Babu Stadium, Lucknow, which was at the time a record for the first wicket in women's Test cricket.

Foster was a member of the side which retained the Ashes in Australia in 2008.

In August 2008, Foster and Sarah Taylor shared a partnership of 268 against South Africa at Lord's, which was at the time a record for any wicket in women's One Day Internationals. Foster was dismissed for 145, her highest score in international cricket.

Foster was a member of the England team which won both the World Cup and World Twenty20 in 2009.

== Coaching career ==
Foster is employed by the Cricket Foundation as a Chance to Shine coaching ambassador and is a coach at Queen's College, an independent school in Taunton, Somerset. She was the head coach of Western Storm for the 2016 Women's Cricket Super League.
