= 2006 Super Fours =

English cricket tournament

- Administrator(s): England and Wales Cricket Board
- Cricket format: 50 over
- Tournament format(s): League system
- Champions: Sapphires (2nd title)
- Participants: 4
- Matches: 12
- Most runs: Claire Taylor, Sapphires (426)
- Most wickets: Laura Newton, Sapphires (9)

The 2006 Super Fours was the fifth cricket Super Fours season. It took place from May to July and saw 4 teams compete in a 50 over league and a Twenty20 knockout tournament. The competing teams were renamed from the 2005 season, with Braves, Knight Riders, Super Strikers and V Team becoming Rubies, Diamonds, Emeralds and Sapphires, respectively. Sapphires won the 50 over league, whilst Diamonds beat Sapphires in the final of the Twenty20 tournament.

== Competition format ==
In the one day tournament, teams played each other twice in a round-robin format, with the winners of the group winning the tournament. Matches were played using a one day format with 50 overs per side.

The group worked on a points system with positions within the divisions being based on the total points. Points were awarded as follows:

Win: 15 points.
Tie: 6 points.
Loss: 0 points.
Bonus Points: Up to 5 points available to the winning team.

The Twenty20 competition reverted to the 2004 format, involving two semi-finals, with the winners progressing to a Final and the losers playing in a third-place play-off.

== Teams ==
Diamonds	Emeralds	Rubies	Sapphires
(England) Charlotte Edwards (c); (England) Lynsey Askew; (England) Laura Boorman; (England) Isa Guha; (England) Laura Joyce (wk); (England) Hannah Lloyd; (England) Beth Morgan; (England) Ebony Rainford-Brent; (England) Nicky Shaw; (England) Laura Thompson (wk); (England) Jasmine Titmuss; (England) Jo Watts; (England) Kirstie White (wk)	(England) Arran Brindle (c); (England) Steph Davies; (England) Kelly Evenson; (England) Jenny Gunn; (England) Laura Harper; (England) Abbey Hawkins; (England) Charlotte Horton; (England) Sophie Le Marchand (wk); (England) Kate Lowe; (England) Nicky Myers; (England) Holly Penwarden; (England) Anya Shrubsole; (England) Jane Smit (wk); (England) Judith Turner; (England) Kirstie White (wk); (England) Beth Wild; (England) Rebecca Williams; (England) Danni Wyatt	(England) Gill Richards (c); (England) Colleen Ashbee; (England) Caroline Atkins; (England) Holly Colvin; (England) Lydia Greenway; (England) Jackie Hawker; (England) Natalie Lane; (England) Laura Marsh; (England) Kate Oakenfold; (England) Lizzie Roberts; (England) Susie Rowe; (England) Anya Shrubsole; (England) Sarah Taylor (wk); (England) Laura Thompson (wk); (England) Alexia Walker	(England) Laura Newton (c); (England) Rosalie Birch; (England) Laura Boorman; (England) Katherine Brunt; (England) Kathryn Doherty; (England) Jenny Dunn; (England) Georgia Elwiss; (England) Lauren Griffiths (wk); (England) Danielle Hazell; (England) Dawn Prestidge; (England) Anna Spragg (wk); (England) Laura Spragg; (England) Robyn Still; (England) Claire Taylor (wk); (England) Rachael Walsh

== 50 over ==
=== Results ===
Team	Pld	W	L	T	A	BP	Pts
Sapphires (C)	6	4	2	0	0	14	74
Rubies	6	3	1	2	0	9	66
Diamonds	6	2	3	1	0	8	44
Emeralds	6	1	4	1	0	1	22

Source: Cricket Archive

3 June	Diamonds; 337/3 (50 overs)	v	Sapphires; 305/5 (50 overs)	Diamonds won by 32 runs
Scorecard	Diamonds; 337/3 (50 overs)	v	Sapphires; 305/5 (50 overs)	Uppingham School, Uppingham; Umpires: John Hayes and Martin Bodenham
Scorecard	Charlotte Edwards 199* (151); Robyn Still 1/20 (2 overs)		Claire Taylor 118* (98); Charlotte Edwards 1/33 (5 overs)	Uppingham School, Uppingham; Umpires: John Hayes and Martin Bodenham
Diamonds won the toss and elected to bat.; Points: Diamonds 20, Sapphires 0				Uppingham School, Uppingham; Umpires: John Hayes and Martin Bodenham

3 June	Emeralds; 161 (50 overs)	v	Rubies; 161/5 (50 overs)	Match Tied
Scorecard	Emeralds; 161 (50 overs)	v	Rubies; 161/5 (50 overs)	Uppingham School, Uppingham; Umpires: Ann Roberts and Tim Robinson
Scorecard	Laura Harper 52 (152); Gill Richards 3/24 (10 overs)		Sarah Taylor 60 (81); Laura Harper 3/32 (10 overs)	Uppingham School, Uppingham; Umpires: Ann Roberts and Tim Robinson
Rubies won the toss and elected to bat.; Points: Rubies 6, Emeralds 6				Uppingham School, Uppingham; Umpires: Ann Roberts and Tim Robinson

4 June	Diamonds; 139 (47.2 overs)	v	Emeralds; 156 (49.4 overs)	Emeralds won by 17 runs
Scorecard	Diamonds; 139 (47.2 overs)	v	Emeralds; 156 (49.4 overs)	Uppingham School, Uppingham; Umpires: John Hayes and Tim Robinson
Scorecard	Hannah Lloyd 53 (131); Jenny Gunn 4/32 (9 overs)		Steph Davies 29 (68); Jo Watts 3/28 (10 overs)	Uppingham School, Uppingham; Umpires: John Hayes and Tim Robinson
Emeralds won the toss and elected to bat.; Points: Emeralds 16, Diamonds 0				Uppingham School, Uppingham; Umpires: John Hayes and Tim Robinson

4 June	Rubies; 206/8 (50 overs)	v	Sapphires; 207/7 (48.2 overs)	Sapphires won by 3 wickets
Scorecard	Rubies; 206/8 (50 overs)	v	Sapphires; 207/7 (48.2 overs)	Uppingham School, Uppingham; Umpires: Ann Roberts and Martin Bodenham
Scorecard	Sarah Taylor 82 (81); Katherine Brunt 2/21 (10 overs)		Claire Taylor 60 (75); Jackie Hawker 3/41 (10 overs)	Uppingham School, Uppingham; Umpires: Ann Roberts and Martin Bodenham
Rubies won the toss and elected to bat.; Points: Sapphires 17, Rubies 0				Uppingham School, Uppingham; Umpires: Ann Roberts and Martin Bodenham

10 June	Diamonds; 246/9 (50 overs)	v	Rubies; 246/7 (50 overs)	Match Tied
Scorecard	Diamonds; 246/9 (50 overs)	v	Rubies; 246/7 (50 overs)	Leighton Park School, Reading; Umpires: Graham Cooper and Terry Urben
Scorecard	Laura Joyce 65 (64); Holly Colvin 2/32 (10 overs)		Caroline Atkins 82 (105); Charlotte Edwards 1/24 (4 overs)	Leighton Park School, Reading; Umpires: Graham Cooper and Terry Urben
Rubies won the toss and elected to bat.; Points: Diamonds 6, Rubies 6				Leighton Park School, Reading; Umpires: Graham Cooper and Terry Urben

10 June	Emeralds; 189/4 (50 overs)	v	Sapphires; 190/3 (36.5 overs)	Sapphires won by 7 wickets
Scorecard	Emeralds; 189/4 (50 overs)	v	Sapphires; 190/3 (36.5 overs)	Haslegrave Ground, Loughborough; Umpires: Annette Owen and Darrell Hair
Scorecard	Jane Smit 66 (91); Dawn Prestidge 2/40 (9 overs)		Claire Taylor 94 (81); Holly Penwarden 1/12 (1 over)	Haslegrave Ground, Loughborough; Umpires: Annette Owen and Darrell Hair
Emeralds won the toss and elected to bat.; Points: Sapphires 20, Emeralds 0				Haslegrave Ground, Loughborough; Umpires: Annette Owen and Darrell Hair

24 June	Diamonds; 126/9 (50 overs)	v	Rubies; 127/9 (47.2 overs)	Rubies won by 1 wicket
Scorecard	Diamonds; 126/9 (50 overs)	v	Rubies; 127/9 (47.2 overs)	Army Cricket Ground, Aldershot; Umpires: John Hayes and Martin Bodenham
Scorecard	Laura Boorman 29* (76); Caroline Atkins 2/25 (10 overs)		Lydia Greenway 24 (56); Isa Guha 4/26 (5 overs)	Army Cricket Ground, Aldershot; Umpires: John Hayes and Martin Bodenham
Diamonds won the toss and elected to bat.; Points: Rubies 16, Diamonds 0				Army Cricket Ground, Aldershot; Umpires: John Hayes and Martin Bodenham

24 June	Emeralds; 153 (47 overs)	v	Sapphires; 154/3 (46.1 overs)	Sapphires won by 7 wickets
Scorecard	Emeralds; 153 (47 overs)	v	Sapphires; 154/3 (46.1 overs)	Worksop College Ground, Worksop; Umpires: Annette Owen and Steve Garratt
Scorecard	Jenny Gunn 32 (70); Katherine Brunt 4/11 (9 overs)		Claire Taylor 33* (35); Charlotte Horton 2/45 (10 overs)	Worksop College Ground, Worksop; Umpires: Annette Owen and Steve Garratt
Sapphires won the toss and elected to field.; Points: Sapphires 20, Emeralds 0				Worksop College Ground, Worksop; Umpires: Annette Owen and Steve Garratt

8 July	Diamonds; 172 (47.4 overs)	v	Sapphires; 197/8 (46.1 overs)	Sapphires won by 25 runs
Scorecard	Diamonds; 172 (47.4 overs)	v	Sapphires; 197/8 (46.1 overs)	Haslegrave Ground, Loughborough; Umpires: Lorraine Elgar and Tim Robinson
Scorecard	Charlotte Edwards 69 (108); Laura Newton 5/22 (9 overs)		Claire Taylor 108 (105); Charlotte Edwards 3/47 (9 overs)	Haslegrave Ground, Loughborough; Umpires: Lorraine Elgar and Tim Robinson
Sapphires won the toss and elected to bat.; Points: Sapphires 17, Diamonds 0				Haslegrave Ground, Loughborough; Umpires: Lorraine Elgar and Tim Robinson

8 July	Emeralds; 144/8 (50 overs)	v	Rubies; 221/6 (50 overs)	Rubies won by 77 runs
Scorecard	Emeralds; 144/8 (50 overs)	v	Rubies; 221/6 (50 overs)	Haslegrave Ground, Loughborough; Umpires: Graham Cooper and Terry Urben
Scorecard	Laura Harper 50 (116); Alexia Walker 4/17 (10 overs)		Caroline Atkins 83 (127); Laura Harper 2/45 (10 overs)	Haslegrave Ground, Loughborough; Umpires: Graham Cooper and Terry Urben
Emeralds won the toss and elected to field.; Points: Rubies 18, Emeralds 0				Haslegrave Ground, Loughborough; Umpires: Graham Cooper and Terry Urben

9 July	Diamonds; 156/5 (50 overs)	v	Emeralds; 153/8 (50 overs)	Diamonds won by 5 wickets
Scorecard	Diamonds; 156/5 (50 overs)	v	Emeralds; 153/8 (50 overs)	Haslegrave Ground, Loughborough; Umpires: Graham Cooper and Tim Robinson
Scorecard	Ebony Rainford-Brent 55 (97); Judith Turner 3/22 (10 overs)		Laura Harper 61 (130); Beth Morgan 4/20 (8 overs)	Haslegrave Ground, Loughborough; Umpires: Graham Cooper and Tim Robinson
Emeralds won the toss and elected to bat.; Points: Diamonds 18, Emeralds 0				Haslegrave Ground, Loughborough; Umpires: Graham Cooper and Tim Robinson

9 July	Rubies; 253/7 (50 overs)	v	Sapphires; 235 (49.4 overs)	Rubies won by 18 runs
Scorecard	Rubies; 253/7 (50 overs)	v	Sapphires; 235 (49.4 overs)	Haslegrave Ground, Loughborough; Umpires: Lorraine Elgar and Terry Urben
Scorecard	Alexia Walker 113* (75); Laura Spragg 3/68 (10 overs)		Laura Newton 143 (146); Jackie Hawker 4/28 (8 overs)	Haslegrave Ground, Loughborough; Umpires: Lorraine Elgar and Terry Urben
Rubies won the toss and elected to bat.; Points: Rubies 20, Sapphires 0				Haslegrave Ground, Loughborough; Umpires: Lorraine Elgar and Terry Urben

== Twenty20 ==
=== Semi-finals ===
29 May	Diamonds; 126/2 (18.2 overs)	v	Rubies; 124/3 (20 overs)	Diamonds won by 8 wickets
Scorecard	Diamonds; 126/2 (18.2 overs)	v	Rubies; 124/3 (20 overs)	Haslegrave Ground, Loughborough; Umpires: Nick Cook and John Hayes
Scorecard	Charlotte Edwards 67* (60); Holly Colvin 1/24 (4 overs)		Alexia Walker 61 (43); Jasmine Titmuss 2/14 (3 overs)	Haslegrave Ground, Loughborough; Umpires: Nick Cook and John Hayes
Diamonds won the toss and elected to field.; Diamonds progress to the final.				Haslegrave Ground, Loughborough; Umpires: Nick Cook and John Hayes

29 May	Emeralds; 89/9 (20 overs)	v	Sapphires; 111/5 (20 overs)	Sapphires won by 22 runs
Scorecard	Emeralds; 89/9 (20 overs)	v	Sapphires; 111/5 (20 overs)	Brockington Ground, Loughborough; Umpires: Annette Owen and Terry Urben
Scorecard	Kate Lowe 15 (21); Katherine Brunt 2/12 (4 overs)		Rosalie Birch 59 (58); Jenny Gunn 1/16 (3 overs)	Brockington Ground, Loughborough; Umpires: Annette Owen and Terry Urben
Emeralds won the toss and elected to field.; Sapphires progress to the final.				Brockington Ground, Loughborough; Umpires: Annette Owen and Terry Urben

=== Third-place play-off ===
29 May	Emeralds; 88/1 (17.4 overs)	v	Rubies; 84 (19.5 overs)	Emeralds won by 9 wickets
Scorecard	Emeralds; 88/1 (17.4 overs)	v	Rubies; 84 (19.5 overs)	Brockington Ground, Loughborough; Umpires: Nick Cook and Annette Owen
Scorecard	Laura Harper 40 (61); Jackie Hawker 1/16 (2.4 overs)		Sarah Taylor 32 (25); Kelly Evenson 3/9 (4 overs)	Brockington Ground, Loughborough; Umpires: Nick Cook and Annette Owen
Emeralds won the toss and elected to field.				Brockington Ground, Loughborough; Umpires: Nick Cook and Annette Owen

=== Final ===
29 May	Diamonds; 158/3 (20 overs)	v	Sapphires; 137/8 (20 overs)	Diamonds won by 21 runs
Scorecard	Diamonds; 158/3 (20 overs)	v	Sapphires; 137/8 (20 overs)	Haslegrave Ground, Loughborough; Umpires: John Hayes and Terry Urben
Scorecard	Nicky Shaw 62* (37); Laura Newton 2/17 (4 overs)		Sarah Taylor 34 (28); Isa Guha 3/23 (4 overs)	Haslegrave Ground, Loughborough; Umpires: John Hayes and Terry Urben
Diamonds won the toss and elected to bat.; Diamonds won the Super Fours Twenty20 2006.				Haslegrave Ground, Loughborough; Umpires: John Hayes and Terry Urben
