= 2007 Super Fours =

- Administrator: England and Wales Cricket Board
- Cricket format: 50 over
- Tournament format: League system
- Champions: Rubies (2nd title)
- Participants: 4
- Matches: 12
- Most runs: Lydia Greenway, Rubies (233)
- Most wickets: Holly Colvin, Rubies (19)

The 2007 Super Fours was the sixth cricket Super Fours season. It took place in June and July and saw 4 teams compete in a 50 over league. A Twenty20 tournament was also scheduled, but abandoned due to rain. Rubies won the tournament, winning all of their matches to claim their second title (having previously won as Braves).

== Competition format ==
In the one day tournament, teams played each other twice in a round-robin format, with the winners of the group winning the tournament. Matches were played using a one day format with 50 overs per side.

The group worked on a points system with positions within the divisions being based on the total points. Points were awarded as follows:

Win: 15 points.
Tie: 6 points.
Loss: 0 points.
Abandoned: 11 points.
Bonus Points: Up to 5 points available to the winning team.

== Teams ==
Diamonds	Emeralds	Rubies	Sapphires
(England) Nicky Shaw (c); (England) Lynsey Askew; (England) Karen Baker (wk); (England) Tammy Beaumont (wk); (England) Charlotte Edwards; (England) Isa Guha; (England) Jenny Gunn; (England) Sophie Le Marchand (wk); (England) Kate Oakenfold; (England) Ebony Rainford-Brent; (England) Charlotte Russell; (England) Anna Stevenson; (England) Laura Thompson (wk); (England) Jo Watts; (England) Beth Wild	(England) Alexia Walker (c); (England) Sarah Clarke; (England) Joanne Cook; (England) Steph Davies; (England) Kelly Evenson; (England) Abbey Hawkins; (England) Danielle Hazell; (England) Charlotte Horton; (England) Laura Joyce (wk); (England) Beth Morgan; (England) Nicky Myers; (England) Jane Smit (wk); (England) Danni Wyatt	(England) Gill Richards (c); (England) Caroline Atkins; (England) Karen Baker (wk); (England) Hannah Burr; (England) Holly Colvin; (England) Jenny Dunn; (England) Lydia Greenway; (England) Heather Knight; (England) Natalie Lane; (England) Laura Marsh; (England) Dawn Prestidge; (England) Susie Rowe; (England) Anya Shrubsole; (England) Sarah Taylor (wk)	(England) Rosalie Birch (c); (England) Laura Boorman; (England) Salliann Briggs; (England) Kate Cross; (England) Kathryn Doherty; (England) Georgia Elwiss; (England) Lauren Griffiths (wk); (England) Jennifer Laycock; (England) Rochelle Petty; (England) Laura Spragg; (England) Claire Taylor (wk); (England) Jasmine Titmuss; (England) Helen Wardlaw; (England) Rebecca Williams

== 50 over ==
=== Results ===
Team	Pld	W	L	T	A	BP	Pts
Rubies (C)	6	6	0	0	0	13	103
Diamonds	6	3	3	0	0	12	57
Emeralds	6	2	3	0	1	1	42
Sapphires	6	0	5	0	1	1	11

Source: Cricket Archive

2 June	Diamonds; 196/4 (50 overs)	v	Sapphires; 154 (47.5 overs)	Diamonds won by 42 runs
Scorecard	Diamonds; 196/4 (50 overs)	v	Sapphires; 154 (47.5 overs)	Brockington Ground, Loughborough; Umpires: John Hayes and Keith Little
Scorecard	Jenny Gunn 51 (114); Helen Wardlaw 1/23 (6 overs)		Claire Taylor 45 (75); Jo Watts 3/10 (7 overs)	Brockington Ground, Loughborough; Umpires: John Hayes and Keith Little
Sapphires won the toss and elected to bat.; Points: Diamonds 17, Sapphires 0				Brockington Ground, Loughborough; Umpires: John Hayes and Keith Little

2 June	Emeralds; 207/7 (50 overs)	v	Rubies; 208/3 (44.5 overs)	Rubies won by 7 wickets
Scorecard	Emeralds; 207/7 (50 overs)	v	Rubies; 208/3 (44.5 overs)	Haslegrave Ground, Loughborough; Umpires: Annette Owen and Janet Rogers
Scorecard	Beth Morgan 44 (67); Caroline Atkins 3/40 (10 overs)		Lydia Greenway 87* (116); Nicky Myers 2/19 (10 overs)	Haslegrave Ground, Loughborough; Umpires: Annette Owen and Janet Rogers
Emeralds won the toss and elected to bat.; Points: Rubies 20, Emeralds 0				Haslegrave Ground, Loughborough; Umpires: Annette Owen and Janet Rogers

3 June	Diamonds; 152 (49.1 overs)	v	Emeralds; 167/9 (50 overs)	Emeralds won by 15 runs
Scorecard	Diamonds; 152 (49.1 overs)	v	Emeralds; 167/9 (50 overs)	Trent College Ground, Long Eaton; Umpires: Ruki de Silva and John Hayes
Scorecard	Kate Oakenfold 44 (84); Nicky Myers 3/26 (10 overs)		Jane Smit 39 (108); Lynsey Askew 2/25 (10 overs)	Trent College Ground, Long Eaton; Umpires: Ruki de Silva and John Hayes
Emeralds won the toss and elected to bat.; Points: Emeralds 16, Diamonds 0				Trent College Ground, Long Eaton; Umpires: Ruki de Silva and John Hayes

3 June	Rubies; 127 (39.5 overs)	v	Sapphires; 61 (30.5 overs)	Rubies won by 66 runs
Scorecard	Rubies; 127 (39.5 overs)	v	Sapphires; 61 (30.5 overs)	Trent College Ground, Long Eaton; Umpires: Annette Owen and Lorraine Elgar
Scorecard	Lydia Greenway 60 (88); Jennifer Laycock 4/7 (2.5 overs)		Rebecca Williams 35 (74); Holly Colvin 5/7 (8.5 overs)	Trent College Ground, Long Eaton; Umpires: Annette Owen and Lorraine Elgar
Sapphires won the toss and elected to field.; Points: Rubies 15, Sapphires 0				Trent College Ground, Long Eaton; Umpires: Annette Owen and Lorraine Elgar

16 June	Emeralds	v	Sapphires	Match Abandoned
Scorecard	Emeralds	v	Sapphires	Worksop College Ground, Worksop; Umpires: Ann Roberts and Keith Little
No toss.; No play possible due to rain.; Points: Emeralds 11, Sapphires 11				Worksop College Ground, Worksop; Umpires: Ann Roberts and Keith Little

16 June	Diamonds; 171/7 (50 overs)	v	Rubies; 172/5 (48 overs)	Rubies won by 5 wickets
Scorecard	Diamonds; 171/7 (50 overs)	v	Rubies; 172/5 (48 overs)	Leighton Park School, Reading; Umpires: Philip Ratcliffe and Sid Moore
Scorecard	Tammy Beaumont 45 (102); Laura Marsh 2/43 (10 overs)		Lydia Greenway 54 (80); Jo Watts 2/19 (7 overs)	Leighton Park School, Reading; Umpires: Philip Ratcliffe and Sid Moore
Diamonds won the toss and elected to bat.; Points: Rubies 18, Diamonds 0				Leighton Park School, Reading; Umpires: Philip Ratcliffe and Sid Moore

23 June	Diamonds; 84/9 (27 overs)	v	Rubies; 98/6 (35 overs)	Rubies won by 11 runs (D/L)
Scorecard	Diamonds; 84/9 (27 overs)	v	Rubies; 98/6 (35 overs)	County Ground, Taunton; Umpires: Stephen Bishopp and John O'Sullivan
Scorecard	Jenny Gunn 22 (49); Holly Colvin 5/27 (8 overs)		Caroline Atkins 37* (75); Nicky Shaw 3/17 (7 overs)	County Ground, Taunton; Umpires: Stephen Bishopp and John O'Sullivan
Diamonds won the toss and elected to field.; Match reduced due to rain.; Points: Rubies 15, Diamonds 0				County Ground, Taunton; Umpires: Stephen Bishopp and John O'Sullivan

23 June	Emeralds; 147 (43 overs)	v	Sapphires; 120 (42.1 overs)	Emeralds won by 27 runs
Scorecard	Emeralds; 147 (43 overs)	v	Sapphires; 120 (42.1 overs)	Haslegrave Ground, Loughborough; Umpires: Ruki de Silva and Ann Roberts
Scorecard	Beth Morgan 65* (114); Laura Spragg 3/18 (9 overs)		Laura Spragg 40 (56); Danni Wyatt 5/23 (9 overs)	Haslegrave Ground, Loughborough; Umpires: Ruki de Silva and Ann Roberts
Sapphires won the toss and elected to field.; Points: Emeralds 15, Sapphires 0				Haslegrave Ground, Loughborough; Umpires: Ruki de Silva and Ann Roberts

7 July	Diamonds; 157/2 (26.5 overs)	v	Sapphires; 154 (47.4 overs)	Diamonds won by 8 wickets
Scorecard	Diamonds; 157/2 (26.5 overs)	v	Sapphires; 154 (47.4 overs)	Haslegrave Ground, Loughborough; Umpires: Kenneth Shenton and Steve Trull
Scorecard	Charlotte Edwards 69* (56); Jennifer Laycock 1/14 (3 overs)		Claire Taylor 54 (68); Lynsey Askew 3/14 (7.4 overs)	Haslegrave Ground, Loughborough; Umpires: Kenneth Shenton and Steve Trull
Diamonds won the toss and elected to field.; Points: Diamonds 20, Sapphires 0				Haslegrave Ground, Loughborough; Umpires: Kenneth Shenton and Steve Trull

7 July	Emeralds; 69 (30.3 overs)	v	Rubies; 71/3 (29.4 overs)	Rubies won by 7 wickets
Scorecard	Emeralds; 69 (30.3 overs)	v	Rubies; 71/3 (29.4 overs)	Brockington Ground, Loughborough; Umpires: Roger Croft and John Hayes
Scorecard	Beth Morgan 19 (60); Holly Colvin 5/7 (7.3 overs)		Sarah Taylor 20 (21); Kelly Evenson 1/11 (8 overs)	Brockington Ground, Loughborough; Umpires: Roger Croft and John Hayes
Emeralds won the toss and elected to bat.; Points: Rubies 20, Emeralds 0				Brockington Ground, Loughborough; Umpires: Roger Croft and John Hayes

8 July	Diamonds; 175/1 (30.3 overs)	v	Emeralds; 173 (49.4 overs)	Diamonds won by 9 wickets
Scorecard	Diamonds; 175/1 (30.3 overs)	v	Emeralds; 173 (49.4 overs)	Haslegrave Ground, Loughborough; Umpires: Brian Jones and Trevor Riley
Scorecard	Charlotte Edwards 94* (90); Beth Morgan 1/29 (5 overs)		Alexia Walker 52 (68); Jenny Gunn 4/28 (10 overs)	Haslegrave Ground, Loughborough; Umpires: Brian Jones and Trevor Riley
Emeralds won the toss and elected to bat.; Points: Diamonds 20, Emeralds 0				Haslegrave Ground, Loughborough; Umpires: Brian Jones and Trevor Riley

8 July	Rubies; 139 (45.5 overs)	v	Sapphires; 124 (44.2 overs)	Rubies won by 15 runs
Scorecard	Rubies; 139 (45.5 overs)	v	Sapphires; 124 (44.2 overs)	Brockington Ground, Loughborough; Umpires: Ruki de Silva and Annette Owen
Scorecard	Sarah Taylor 30 (31); Helen Wardlaw 3/18 (10 overs)		Claire Taylor 32 (52); Holly Colvin 3/12 (10 overs)	Brockington Ground, Loughborough; Umpires: Ruki de Silva and Annette Owen
Sapphires won the toss and elected to field.; Points: Rubies 15, Sapphires 0				Brockington Ground, Loughborough; Umpires: Ruki de Silva and Annette Owen

== Twenty20 ==
A Twenty20 tournament consisting of semi-finals and a Final was scheduled for 28 May, but was abandoned due to rain.
