= 2002 Super Fours =

- Administrator(s): England and Wales Cricket Board
- Cricket format: 50 over
- Tournament format(s): League system
- Champions: Braves (1st title)
- Participants: 4
- Matches: 12
- Most runs: Claire Taylor, Super Strikers (310)
- Most wickets: Gill Richards, V Team (11)

The 2002 Super Fours was the inaugural cricket Super Fours tournament. It took place in May and June and saw 4 teams compete in a 50 over league. The tournament was conceived as a way of bridging the gap between women's county cricket and international cricket, and preparing players for the upcoming England internationals. Braves were the first winners of the competition, winning four out of six games.

== Competition format ==
Teams played each other twice in a round-robin format, with the winners of the group winning the tournament. Matches were played using a one day format with 50 overs per side.

The group worked on a points system with positions within the divisions being based on the total points. 12 points were awarded for a win.

== Teams ==
Braves	Knight Riders	Super Strikers	V Team
(England) Clare Connor (c); (England) Yvonne Craven; (England) Ella Donnison (wk); (England) Mandie Godliman (wk); (England) Clare Gough; (England) Isa Guha; (England) Laura Harper; (India) Chanderkanta Kaul; (England) Samantha Keyes; (England) Natalie Lane; (England) Laura Marsh; (England) Beth Morgan; (England) Melissa Reynard	(England) Charlotte Edwards (c); (England) Caroline Atkins; (England) Rosalie Birch; (England) Charlotte Burton; (England) Sarah Collyer; (England) Steph Davies; (England) Janet Godman; (England) Lydia Greenway; (England) Jenny Gunn; (England) Lorna Jesty; (England) Sue Metcalfe (wk); (India) Radhi Nanalal; (England) Lucy Pearson; (England) Ebony Rainford-Brent	(England) Claire Taylor (c); (England) Salliann Briggs; (England) Sarah Clarke; (England) Dawn Holden; (England) Hannah Lloyd; (England) Rebecca Moore; (England) Laura Newton; (England) Nicky Shaw; (England) Jane Smit (wk); (England) Laura Spragg; (England) Alexia Walker; (England) Helen Wardlaw	(England) Clare Taylor (c); (England) Claire Atkinson; (England) Arran Brindle; (England) Leanne Davis; (England) Kelly Evenson; (England) Jackie Hawker; (England) Laura Joyce (wk); (England) Kathryn Leng; (England) Alexis Mannion; (England) Kate Oakenfold; (England) Dawn Prestidge; (England) Gill Richards; (England) Jo Robinies

== Results ==
Team	Pld	W	L	T	A	Pts
Braves (C)	6	4	2	0	0	48
Knight Riders	6	3	3	0	0	36
V Team	6	3	3	0	0	36
Super Strikers	6	2	4	0	0	24

Source: Cricket Archive

18 May	Braves; 98 (30 overs)	v	Super Strikers; 183/4 (30 overs)	Super Strikers won by 85 runs
Scorecard	Braves; 98 (30 overs)	v	Super Strikers; 183/4 (30 overs)	Denis Compton Oval, Shenley; Umpires: Ann Roberts and Trevor Waite; Player of the match: Claire Taylor
Scorecard	Ella Donnison 20 (–); Sarah Clarke 3/9 (4 overs)		Claire Taylor 99* (80); Melissa Reynard 2/39 (6 overs)	Denis Compton Oval, Shenley; Umpires: Ann Roberts and Trevor Waite; Player of the match: Claire Taylor
Braves won the toss and elected to field.; Match reduced to 30 overs per side.; Points: Super Strikers 12, Braves 0				Denis Compton Oval, Shenley; Umpires: Ann Roberts and Trevor Waite; Player of the match: Claire Taylor

18 May	Knight Riders; 119/7 (29.5 overs)	v	V Team; 126/5 (30 overs)	V Team won by 7 runs
Scorecard	Knight Riders; 119/7 (29.5 overs)	v	V Team; 126/5 (30 overs)	Denis Compton Oval, Shenley; Umpires: Graham Payne and Janet Rogers; Player of the match: Kathryn Leng
Scorecard	Caroline Atkins 42 (74); Gill Richards 3/34 (5.5 overs)		Kathryn Leng 60 (85); Radhi Nanalal 1/17 (6 overs)	Denis Compton Oval, Shenley; Umpires: Graham Payne and Janet Rogers; Player of the match: Kathryn Leng
Knight Riders won the toss and elected to field.; Match reduced to 30 overs per side.; Points: V Team 12, Knight Riders 0				Denis Compton Oval, Shenley; Umpires: Graham Payne and Janet Rogers; Player of the match: Kathryn Leng

26 May	Braves; 138/7 (40 overs)	v	Knight Riders; 86/4 (30.4 overs)	Braves won on faster scoring rate
Scorecard	Braves; 138/7 (40 overs)	v	Knight Riders; 86/4 (30.4 overs)	Oakham School, Oakham; Umpires: Graham Cooper and Graham Payne; Player of the match: Radhi Nanalal
Scorecard	Laura Harper 28 (63); Radhi Nanalal 2/19 (8 overs)		Charlotte Edwards 29* (48); Beth Morgan 2/28 (7 overs)	Oakham School, Oakham; Umpires: Graham Cooper and Graham Payne; Player of the match: Radhi Nanalal
Knight Riders won the toss and elected to field.; Match reduced to 40 overs per side.; Points: Braves 12, Knight Riders 0				Oakham School, Oakham; Umpires: Graham Cooper and Graham Payne; Player of the match: Radhi Nanalal

26 May	Super Strikers; 149/8 (40 overs)	v	V Team; 81/2 (21.2 overs)	V Team won on faster scoring rate
Scorecard	Super Strikers; 149/8 (40 overs)	v	V Team; 81/2 (21.2 overs)	Oakham School, Oakham; Umpires: Annette Owen and Mel Smith; Player of the match: Gill Richards
Scorecard	Salliann Briggs 39 (86); Gill Richards 3/25 (7 overs)		Arran Brindle 30* (59); Nicky Shaw 1/16 (6 overs)	Oakham School, Oakham; Umpires: Annette Owen and Mel Smith; Player of the match: Gill Richards
V Team won the toss and elected to field.; Match reduced to 40 overs per side.; Points: V Team 12, Super Strikers 0				Oakham School, Oakham; Umpires: Annette Owen and Mel Smith; Player of the match: Gill Richards

2 June	Braves; 121 (38.3 overs)	v	V Team; 122/3 (32.4 overs)	V Team won by 7 wickets
Scorecard	Braves; 121 (38.3 overs)	v	V Team; 122/3 (32.4 overs)	Bradfield College, Reading; Umpires: Graham Cooper and Graham Payne; Player of the match: Kathryn Leng
Scorecard	Clare Connor 46 (91); Kate Oakenfold 2/8 (3.3 overs)		Kathryn Leng 43 (71); Yvonne Craven 2/10 (8 overs)	Bradfield College, Reading; Umpires: Graham Cooper and Graham Payne; Player of the match: Kathryn Leng
Braves won the toss and elected to bat.; Points: V Team 12, Braves 0				Bradfield College, Reading; Umpires: Graham Cooper and Graham Payne; Player of the match: Kathryn Leng

2 June	Knight Riders; 141 (45.1 overs)	v	Super Strikers; 104 (38.1 overs)	Knight Riders won by 37 runs
Scorecard	Knight Riders; 141 (45.1 overs)	v	Super Strikers; 104 (38.1 overs)	Bradfield College, Reading; Umpires: Valerie Gibbens and Jim Jenkinson; Player of the match: Lucy Pearson
Scorecard	Rosalie Birch 48* (89); Nicky Shaw 4/21 (8 overs)		Laura Newton 22 (58); Lucy Pearson 5/28 (9.1 overs)	Bradfield College, Reading; Umpires: Valerie Gibbens and Jim Jenkinson; Player of the match: Lucy Pearson
Knight Riders won the toss and elected to bat.; Points: Knight Riders 12, Super Strikers 0				Bradfield College, Reading; Umpires: Valerie Gibbens and Jim Jenkinson; Player of the match: Lucy Pearson

3 June	Braves; 140/3 (40.2 overs)	v	Knight Riders; 138 (48.5 overs)	Braves won by 7 wickets
Scorecard	Braves; 140/3 (40.2 overs)	v	Knight Riders; 138 (48.5 overs)	Bradfield College, Reading; Umpires: Graham Cooper and Graham Payne; Player of the match: Yvonne Craven
Scorecard	Clare Connor 73 (142); Lucy Pearson 1/27 (10 overs)		Charlotte Edwards 73* (129); Yvonne Craven 2/17 (10 overs)	Bradfield College, Reading; Umpires: Graham Cooper and Graham Payne; Player of the match: Yvonne Craven
Knight Riders won the toss and elected to bat.; Points: Braves 12, Knight Riders 0				Bradfield College, Reading; Umpires: Graham Cooper and Graham Payne; Player of the match: Yvonne Craven

3 June	Super Strikers; 212 (50 overs)	v	V Team; 143 (43.5 overs)	Super Strikers won by 69 runs
Scorecard	Super Strikers; 212 (50 overs)	v	V Team; 143 (43.5 overs)	Bradfield College, Reading; Umpires: Valerie Gibbens and Elizabeth Haynes; Player of the match: Kathryn Leng
Scorecard	Claire Taylor 38 (72); Kathryn Leng 3/40 (10 overs)		Laura Joyce 41 (72); Nicky Shaw 2/8 (6 overs)	Bradfield College, Reading; Umpires: Valerie Gibbens and Elizabeth Haynes; Player of the match: Kathryn Leng
V Team won the toss and elected to field.; Points: Super Strikers 12, V Team 0				Bradfield College, Reading; Umpires: Valerie Gibbens and Elizabeth Haynes; Player of the match: Kathryn Leng

8 June	Braves; 118/6 (46.2 overs)	v	Super Strikers; 117 (43.5 overs)	Braves won by 4 wickets
Scorecard	Braves; 118/6 (46.2 overs)	v	Super Strikers; 117 (43.5 overs)	Ratcliffe College, Cossington; Umpires: Graham Cooper and John Hayes; Player of the match: Clare Connor
Scorecard	Clare Connor 48 (55); Isa Guha 3/26 (10 overs)		Claire Taylor 50 (101); Kathryn Leng 3/40 (10 overs)	Ratcliffe College, Cossington; Umpires: Graham Cooper and John Hayes; Player of the match: Clare Connor
Braves won the toss and elected to field.; Points: Braves 12, Super Strikers 0				Ratcliffe College, Cossington; Umpires: Graham Cooper and John Hayes; Player of the match: Clare Connor

8 June	Knight Riders; 133/4 (45.2 overs)	v	V Team; 132/9 (50 overs)	Knight Riders won by 6 wickets
Scorecard	Knight Riders; 133/4 (45.2 overs)	v	V Team; 132/9 (50 overs)	Ratcliffe College, Cossington; Umpires: Ann Roberts and Trevor Waite; Player of the match: Sue Metcalfe
Scorecard	Sue Metcalfe 54* (75); Kate Oakenfold 2/20 (7 overs)		Laura Joyce 37 (69); Jenny Gunn 2/25 (10 overs)	Ratcliffe College, Cossington; Umpires: Ann Roberts and Trevor Waite; Player of the match: Sue Metcalfe
Knight Riders won the toss and elected to field.; Points: Knight Riders 12, V Team 0				Ratcliffe College, Cossington; Umpires: Ann Roberts and Trevor Waite; Player of the match: Sue Metcalfe

15 June	Braves; 162/9 (50 overs)	v	V Team; 98 (32.5 overs)	Braves won on faster scoring rate
Scorecard	Braves; 162/9 (50 overs)	v	V Team; 98 (32.5 overs)	King's College, Taunton; Umpires: John Hayes and Graham Payne; Player of the match: Clare Connor
Scorecard	Laura Harper 46 (123); Gill Richards 3/14 (5 overs)		Arran Brindle 29 (47); Clare Connor 5/8 (8 overs)	King's College, Taunton; Umpires: John Hayes and Graham Payne; Player of the match: Clare Connor
V Team won the toss and elected to field.; V Team innings reduced to 36 overs.; Points: Braves 12, V Team 0				King's College, Taunton; Umpires: John Hayes and Graham Payne; Player of the match: Clare Connor

15 June	Knight Riders; 293/5 (50 overs)	v	Super Strikers; 98 (32.5 overs)	Knight Riders won on faster scoring rate
Scorecard	Knight Riders; 293/5 (50 overs)	v	Super Strikers; 98 (32.5 overs)	King's College, Taunton; Umpires: Colin Booth and Jim Jenkinson; Player of the match: Charlotte Burton
Scorecard	Charlotte Edwards 124* (136); Laura Newton 1/38 (6 overs)		Claire Taylor 93 (66); Charlotte Burton 5/39 (8 overs)	King's College, Taunton; Umpires: Colin Booth and Jim Jenkinson; Player of the match: Charlotte Burton
Super Strikers won the toss and elected to field.; Super Strikers innings reduced to 39 overs.; Points: Knight Riders 12, Super Strikers 0				King's College, Taunton; Umpires: Colin Booth and Jim Jenkinson; Player of the match: Charlotte Burton
