= 2008 Super Fours =

- Administrator: England and Wales Cricket Board
- Cricket format: 50 over
- Tournament format: League system
- Champions: Sapphires (3rd title)
- Participants: 4
- Matches: 12
- Most runs: Leah Poulton, Sapphires (215)
- Most wickets: Georgia Elwiss, Diamonds; Jenny Gunn, Emeralds; Danielle Hazell, Sapphires (9)

The 2008 Super Fours was the seventh cricket Super Fours season. It took place from May to July and saw 4 teams compete in a 50 over league and a Twenty20 knockout tournament. Sapphires won the 50 over tournament, achieving their third 50 over title, whilst Rubies won the Twenty20 tournament, claiming their first title in the format.

== Competition format ==
In the one day tournament, teams played each other twice in a round-robin format, with the winners of the group winning the tournament. Matches were played using a one day format with 50 overs per team.

The group worked on a points system with positions within the divisions being based on the total points. Points were awarded as follows:

Win: 15 points.
Tie: 6 points.
Loss: 0 points.
Bonus Points: Up to 5 points available to the winning team.

The Twenty20 competition consisted of two semi-finals, with the winners progressing to a Final and the losers playing in a third-place play-off.

== Teams ==
Diamonds	Emeralds	Rubies	Sapphires
(England) Charlotte Edwards (c); (Australia) Charlotte Anneveld; (England) Lynsey Askew; (England) Karen Baker (wk); (England) Sarah Bartlett; (England) Tammy Beaumont (wk); (England) Rosalie Birch; (England) Georgia Elwiss; (England) Lydia Greenway; (England) Charlotte Horton; (England) Beth Morgan; (England) Ebony Rainford-Brent; (England) Anna Stevenson; (England) Izzy Westbury	(England) Nicky Shaw (c); (England) Salliann Briggs; (England) Daisy Gardner; (England) Jenny Gunn; (England) Laura Joyce (wk); (England) Heather Knight; (England) Laura Marsh; (England) Nicky Myers; (England) Sarah Taylor (wk); (England) Jasmine Titmuss; (England) Jo Watts; (England) Beth Wild; (England) Danni Wyatt	(England) Gill Richards (c); (England) Caroline Atkins; (England) Karen Baker (wk); (Australia) Alex Blackwell; (Australia) Elwyn Campbell; (England) Holly Colvin; (England) Steph Davies; (England) Isa Guha; (England) Holly Knight; (England) Natalie Lane; (England) Sophie Le Marchand (wk); (England) Kate Oakenfold; (South Africa) Amanda Potgieter; (England) Anya Shrubsole; (England) Jo Watts; (England) Rebecca Williams	(England) Alexia Walker (c); (England) Tammy Beaumont (wk); (England) Katherine Brunt; (England) Kate Cross; (England) Kathryn Doherty; (England) Jenny Halstead; (England) Lauren Griffiths (wk); (England) Danielle Hazell; (England) Stephanie Masters; (England) Rochelle Petty; (Australia) Leah Poulton; (England) Dawn Prestidge; (England) Laura Spragg; (England) Claire Taylor (wk)

== 50 over ==
=== Results ===
Team	Pld	W	L	T	A	BP	Pts
Sapphires (C)	6	3	1	0	2	7	74
Diamonds	6	2	2	0	2	10	62
Emeralds	6	2	2	0	2	2	54
Rubies	6	1	3	0	2	3	40

Source: ESPN Cricinfo

31 May	Diamonds; 120 (41.5 overs)	v	Emeralds; 166 (46.5 overs)	Emeralds won by 46 runs
Scorecard	Diamonds; 120 (41.5 overs)	v	Emeralds; 166 (46.5 overs)	Haslegrave Ground, Loughborough; Umpires: Annette Owen and John Hayes
Scorecard	Charlotte Edwards 50 (69); Jenny Gunn 2/9 (2 overs)		Sarah Taylor 58 (96); Georgia Elwiss 3/15 (8.5 overs)	Haslegrave Ground, Loughborough; Umpires: Annette Owen and John Hayes
Emeralds won the toss and elected to bat.; Points: Emeralds 16, Diamonds 0				Haslegrave Ground, Loughborough; Umpires: Annette Owen and John Hayes

31 May	Rubies; 146/8 (50 overs)	v	Sapphires; 147/6 (45.1 overs)	Sapphires won by 4 wickets
Scorecard	Rubies; 146/8 (50 overs)	v	Sapphires; 147/6 (45.1 overs)	Brockington Ground, Loughborough; Umpires: Ann Roberts and John Harper
Scorecard	Anya Shrubsole 27 (40); Katherine Brunt 2/18 (9 overs)		Leah Poulton 50 (87); Isa Guha 2/23 (10 overs)	Brockington Ground, Loughborough; Umpires: Ann Roberts and John Harper
Rubies won the toss and elected to bat.; Points: Sapphires 17, Rubies 0				Brockington Ground, Loughborough; Umpires: Ann Roberts and John Harper

1 June	Diamonds; 163 (34.1 overs)	v	Sapphires; 192/6 (35 overs)	Sapphires won by 29 runs
Scorecard	Diamonds; 163 (34.1 overs)	v	Sapphires; 192/6 (35 overs)	Haslegrave Ground, Loughborough; Umpires: Ian Armitage and Arnold Brotherhood
Scorecard	Lydia Greenway 43 (60); Danielle Hazell 5/27 (6.1 overs)		Leah Poulton 69 (87); Georgia Elwiss 4/24 (7 overs)	Haslegrave Ground, Loughborough; Umpires: Ian Armitage and Arnold Brotherhood
Diamonds won the toss and elected to field.; Points: Sapphires 17, Diamonds 0				Haslegrave Ground, Loughborough; Umpires: Ian Armitage and Arnold Brotherhood

1 June	Emeralds; 163/3 (35 overs)	v	Rubies; 118/9 (35 overs)	Emeralds won by 45 runs
Scorecard	Emeralds; 163/3 (35 overs)	v	Rubies; 118/9 (35 overs)	Brockington Ground, Loughborough; Umpires: Annette Owen and John Hayes
Scorecard	Sarah Taylor 60 (68); Holly Colvin 1/20 (7 overs)		Amanda Potgieter 26 (33); Jenny Gunn 3/22 (7 overs)	Brockington Ground, Loughborough; Umpires: Annette Owen and John Hayes
Rubies won the toss and elected to field.; Match reduced to 35 overs per team.; Points: Emeralds 16, Rubies 0				Brockington Ground, Loughborough; Umpires: Annette Owen and John Hayes

14 June	Emeralds; 116 (42.4 overs)	v	Sapphires; 202 (46.5 overs)	Sapphires won by 86 runs
Scorecard	Emeralds; 116 (42.4 overs)	v	Sapphires; 202 (46.5 overs)	Worksop College Ground, Worksop; Umpires: Annette Owen and Graham Harvey
Scorecard	Sarah Taylor 52 (78); Katherine Brunt 2/16 (10 overs)		Claire Taylor 100 (110); Jenny Gunn 4/37 (7 overs)	Worksop College Ground, Worksop; Umpires: Annette Owen and Graham Harvey
Sapphires won the toss and elected to bat.; Points: Sapphires 18, Emeralds 0				Worksop College Ground, Worksop; Umpires: Annette Owen and Graham Harvey

14 June	Diamonds; 263/5 (50 overs)	v	Rubies; 198/8 (50 overs)	Diamonds won by 65 runs
Scorecard	Diamonds; 263/5 (50 overs)	v	Rubies; 198/8 (50 overs)	Kent County Cricket Ground, Beckenham; Umpires: Roger Croft and Martin Seguss
Scorecard	Lydia Greenway 71 (89); Caroline Atkins 1/26 (10 overs)		Caroline Atkins 69 (85); Anna Stevenson 2/20 (5 overs)	Kent County Cricket Ground, Beckenham; Umpires: Roger Croft and Martin Seguss
Diamonds won the toss and elected to bat.; Points: Diamonds 20, Rubies 0				Kent County Cricket Ground, Beckenham; Umpires: Roger Croft and Martin Seguss

21 June	Diamonds	v	Rubies	Match Abandoned
Scorecard	Diamonds	v	Rubies	Topsham Sports Ground, Exeter
No toss.; No play possible due to rain.; Points: Diamonds 11, Rubies 11				Topsham Sports Ground, Exeter

21 June	Emeralds	v	Sapphires	Match Abandoned
Scorecard	Emeralds	v	Sapphires	Topsham Sports Ground, Exeter
No toss.; No play possible due to rain.; Points: Emeralds 11, Sapphires 11				Topsham Sports Ground, Exeter

5 July	Diamonds; 299/8 (50 overs)	v	Sapphires; 243 (46.4 overs)	Diamonds won by 56 runs
Scorecard	Diamonds; 299/8 (50 overs)	v	Sapphires; 243 (46.4 overs)	Wellington College, Crowthorne; Umpires: Terry Owen and Keith Parsons
Scorecard	Ebony Rainford-Brent 133 (147); Katherine Brunt 2/31 (10 overs)		Leah Poulton 59 (86); Charlotte Anneveld 4/33 (8.4 overs)	Wellington College, Crowthorne; Umpires: Terry Owen and Keith Parsons
Diamonds won the toss and elected to bat.; Points: Diamonds 20, Sapphires 0				Wellington College, Crowthorne; Umpires: Terry Owen and Keith Parsons

5 July	Emeralds; 187 (49.4 overs)	v	Rubies; 201/7 (50 overs)	Rubies won by 14 runs
Scorecard	Emeralds; 187 (49.4 overs)	v	Rubies; 201/7 (50 overs)	Wellington College, Crowthorne; Umpires: Roger Croft and Graham Cooper
Scorecard	Heather Knight 35 (55); Holly Colvin 2/5 (10 overs)		Caroline Atkins 95 (138); Daisy Gardner 2/39 (8 overs)	Wellington College, Crowthorne; Umpires: Roger Croft and Graham Cooper
Rubies won the toss and elected to bat.; Points: Rubies 18, Emeralds 0				Wellington College, Crowthorne; Umpires: Roger Croft and Graham Cooper

6 July	Diamonds	v	Emeralds	Match Abandoned
Scorecard	Diamonds	v	Emeralds	Wellington College, Crowthorne
No toss.; No play possible due to rain.; Points: Diamonds 11, Emeralds 11				Wellington College, Crowthorne

6 July	Rubies	v	Sapphires	Match Abandoned
Scorecard	Rubies	v	Sapphires	Wellington College, Crowthorne
No toss.; No play possible due to rain.; Points: Rubies 11, Sapphires 11				Wellington College, Crowthorne

== Twenty20 ==
=== Semi-finals ===
26 May	Diamonds; 124/4 (19.5 overs)	v	Sapphires; 123 (19.4 overs)	Diamonds won by 6 wickets
Scorecard	Diamonds; 124/4 (19.5 overs)	v	Sapphires; 123 (19.4 overs)	Brockington Road, Loughborough; Umpires: John Hayes and C McGuiness
Scorecard	Charlotte Edwards 57* (55); Rochelle Petty 1/22 (4 overs)		Leah Poulton 32 (17); Georgia Elwiss 2/7 (2.4 overs)	Brockington Road, Loughborough; Umpires: John Hayes and C McGuiness
Diamonds won the toss and elected to field.; Diamonds progress to the final.				Brockington Road, Loughborough; Umpires: John Hayes and C McGuiness

26 May	Emeralds; 77/9 (20 overs)	v	Rubies; 83/9 (20 overs)	Rubies won by 6 runs
Scorecard	Emeralds; 77/9 (20 overs)	v	Rubies; 83/9 (20 overs)	Haslegrave Ground, Loughborough; Umpires: Ian Armitage and Arnold Brotherhood
Scorecard	Laura Joyce 20 (40); Holly Colvin 2/11 (4 overs)		Rebecca Williams 18 (27); Nicky Myers 4/11 (4 overs)	Haslegrave Ground, Loughborough; Umpires: Ian Armitage and Arnold Brotherhood
Emeralds won the toss and elected to field.; Rubies progress to the final.				Haslegrave Ground, Loughborough; Umpires: Ian Armitage and Arnold Brotherhood

=== Third-place play-off ===
26 May	Emeralds; 119/4 (20 overs)	v	Sapphires; 123/3 (18.2 overs)	Sapphires won by 7 wickets
Scorecard	Emeralds; 119/4 (20 overs)	v	Sapphires; 123/3 (18.2 overs)	Brockington Ground, Loughborough; Umpires: John Hayes and C McGuiness
Scorecard	Salliann Briggs 31 (40); Leah Poulton 2/23 (3 overs)		Jenny Halstead 56* (53); Danni Wyatt 1/16 (3 overs)	Brockington Ground, Loughborough; Umpires: John Hayes and C McGuiness
Emeralds won the toss and elected to bat.				Brockington Ground, Loughborough; Umpires: John Hayes and C McGuiness

=== Final ===
26 May	Diamonds; 106/8 (20 overs)	v	Rubies; 110/7 (20 overs)	Rubies won by 4 runs
Scorecard	Diamonds; 106/8 (20 overs)	v	Rubies; 110/7 (20 overs)	Haslegrave Ground, Loughborough; Umpires: Ian Armitage and Arnold Brotherhood
Scorecard	Lydia Greenway 42* (33); Isa Guha 2/15 (4 overs)		Kate Oakenfold 35 (31); Charlotte Edwards 2/28 (4 overs)	Haslegrave Ground, Loughborough; Umpires: Ian Armitage and Arnold Brotherhood
Diamonds won the toss and elected to field.; Rubies won the Super Fours Twenty20 2008.				Haslegrave Ground, Loughborough; Umpires: Ian Armitage and Arnold Brotherhood
