= Sophie Le Marchand =

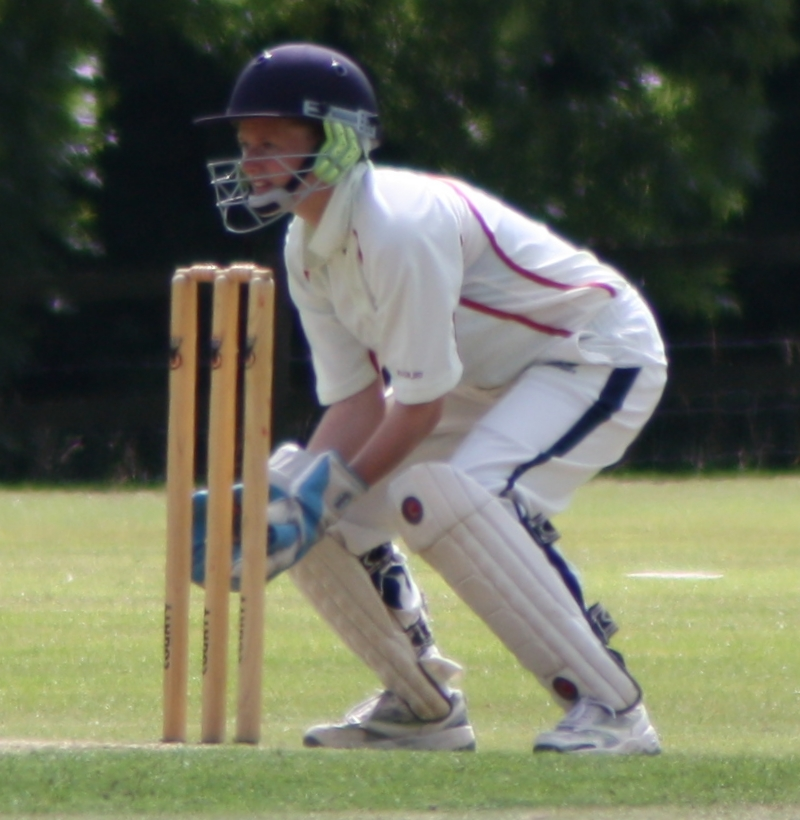

Personal information
- Full name: Sophie Jane Le Marchand
- Born: 2 October 1988 (age 38); Worcester, England
- Batting: Right-handed
- Role: Wicket-keeper

Domestic team information
- Years: Team
- 2004–2007: Worcestershire
- 2008–2014: Somerset

Career statistics
Competition	List A	Twenty20
Matches	45	8
Runs scored	592	34
Batting average	19.09	8.50
100s/50s	0/3	0/0
Top score	69	16
Catches/stumpings	20/20	2/10
- Source: CricketArchive, 15 November 2011

Sophie Jane Le Marchand (born 2 October 1988) is an English cricketer who plays as a wicket-keeper batsman. She is currently part of the England women's academy, having previously represented her country at Under-21 level. A right-handed batsman, she has played for Somerset since 2008.

== Personal life ==
Born in Worcester and educated at the King's School, Worcester, Le Marchand read Classical Archaeology and Ancient History at Somerville College, Oxford. She has since retired to a life of professional football, playing for Leyton Orient.

== Domestic career ==
=== Worcestershire ===
Le Marchand began her county cricket career with Worcestershire women's cricket team, and was part of the successful Under-15s team which won the 2002 Women's Under-15s County Championship. In the final, Le Marchand top scored, remaining on 54 not out during match reduced to 30-overs. She also took one catch as wicket-keeper during Essex's innings as Worcestershire secured a 55-run victory. During 2004, Le Marchand played for the Under-15s and Under-17s as well as making her debut for the Worcestershire first team during the County Challenge Cup. She made two centuries and an unbeaten half-century for the Under-15s. She fared less well outside of the Under-15s; her highest score being the 20 she made on debut for the first team against Wiltshire. Her performances saw her selected to compete in the Junior Super Fours, where she represented South East Under-19s Women. She top-scored for her side in the final with 18, as they suffered an 84 run defeat to the Midlands.

Le Marchand represented Worcestershire in the County Challenge Cup again in 2005, taking two stumpings and scoring 7 runs as her county lost to Warwickshire. She appeared regularly for Worcestershire Under-17s, scoring prolifically. Batting as part of the top order, she made 96 not out against Nottinghamshire, 48 not out against Leicestershire, and 64 against Staffordshire, top-scoring for her side on each occasion.

In 2006, Le Marchand was selected to take part in the Super Fours—a competition in which the England selectors place the 48 leading players into four teams—for the first time. In the Twenty20 tournament, she was selected as a specialist batsman, with England's national women's team player Jane Smit keeping wicket for the Emeralds. Despite her role however, Le Marchand batted low in the order, at number ten in the semi-final, and at number eight in the third place playoff. She played a similar role in the first three matches of the 50-over Super Fours tournament, but took over as wicket-keeper for the next three, claiming two stumpings. She was one of only four players to take part in all six matches for the Emeralds, and scored 48 runs at an average of 9.60. In two recorded matches for Worcestershire Under-17s, she top-scored in her county's innings on both occasions, making 28 of Worcestershire's 77 in a heavy defeat to Warwickshire, and 126 in a large victory over Shropshire.

The 2007 Super Fours competition saw Le Marchand represent the Diamonds, once again playing all six matches. She batted as part of the lower order, and only played two innings, scoring 14 runs in the competition. Her 12 dismissals in the tournament—5 stumpings and 7 catches—were the most by any player.

=== Move to Somerset ===
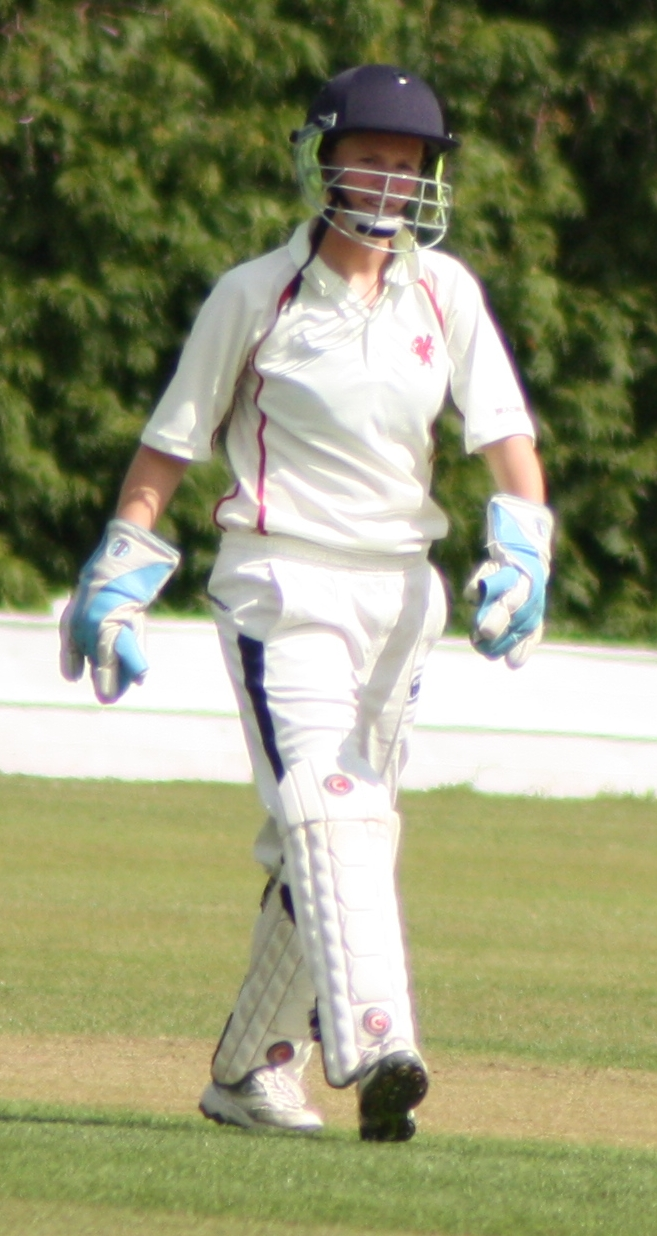
Le Marchand playing for Somerset in 2010

In 2008, Le Marchand moved from Worcestershire to Somerset, allowing her to compete in Division Two of the Women's County Championship. She made her debut in the competition against Surrey in May 2008, scoring 45 runs off 57 balls for her new county. She finished the season with a batting average of 41.00, joint second-highest on the team behind Elwyn Campbell. Playing in the middle order, her 45 on debut remained her highest score of the season, but she made useful scores in both matches against Lancashire and remained unbeaten twice. She was once again selected to play in the Super Fours, playing four of six matches for the Rubies. She failed to pass 20 runs in any of her innings, although she remained not out on 19 against the Diamonds at the close of the innings.

Promoted to open the innings alongside her captain Steph Davies for the start of the 2009 campaign, Le Marchand scored two half-centuries in her first four matches of the season before being moved back down the order. She scored 69 runs and shared an opening partnership of 128 with Davies during Somerset's opening home fixture against Surrey, helping her side to a 21 run victory. Her second half-century, a slow 57 which was scored off 136 balls, came during a 4 wicket defeat to Kent two matches later. The remaining four matches of the season saw her move around the batting order, twice playing in the middle order, and twice opening. She failed to reach double figures in any of these matches, scoring ducks on each occasion she opened, and five runs in each of the other two matches. She finished the season with 165 runs, fourth-highest in the Somerset team.

During the 2010 Women's Twenty20 Cup, Le Marchand claimed three stumpings during Somerset's victory over neighbours Devon, the second time she had achieved this feat in her career, having previously done so during the 2008 Super Fours for the Rubies against the Emeralds.

== International career ==
Le Marchand made her international debut in early August 2006, appearing for England A in a 50-over contest against the touring India women. England A won the reduced match by the Duckworth–Lewis method, with Le Marchand—playing as a wicket-keeper batsman—not required to bat. Selected as part of the England Under-21 squad which won the 2006 Women's European Under-21 Championship, Le Marchand took one stumping, and was not required to bat in either of England's two matches. The following English summer, she made four appearances for the England Development squad prior to the Women's European Championship, facing South Africa in two 50-over contests, and the New Zealand and England women's team in Twenty20s. Batting at number eight in both of the matches against South Africa, Le Marchand made scores of 23 and 0. In the subsequent Twenty20 matches she claimed three stumpings, and made two low totals, scoring 3 against England, and 2 against New Zealand.

Le Marchand played in all three matches during the England Development Squad's successful Women's European Championship campaign in 2007. She was only required to bat once as England won all three of their matches, when she scored 31 runs off 32 balls against Ireland. She claimed one catch and 4 stumpings during the tournament.

In 2016 Le Marchand was playing cricket for Bath Ladies and football for the successful Leyton Orient Women's team. Source: Neilson N. Kaufman, honorary historian Leyton Orient FC.
