= 2012 Super Fours =

- Administrator(s): England and Wales Cricket Board
- Cricket format: 50 over
- Tournament format(s): League system
- Champions: No overall winner
- Participants: 4
- Matches: 4
- Most runs: Charlotte Edwards, Diamonds (213)
- Most wickets: Beth Langston, Diamonds (9)

The 2012 Super Fours was the ninth cricket Super Fours season. It took place in May and saw 4 teams compete in 50 over and Twenty20 matches. There was no overall winner in the 50 over tournament, whilst Rubies won the Twenty20 tournament, their second title in the format.

== Competition format ==
In the one day tournament, each team played two games, with no overall winner declared.

The Twenty20 competition consisted of two semi-finals, with the winners progressing to a Final and the losers playing in a third-place play-off.

== Teams ==
Diamonds	Emeralds	Rubies	Sapphires
(England) Charlotte Edwards (c); (England) Tammy Beaumont (wk); (England) Thea Brookes; (England) Katherine Brunt; (England) Daisy Gardner; (England) Chiara Green; (England) Danielle Hazell; (England) Beth Langston; (England) Sophie Luff; (England) Bethan Moorcraft; (England) Sophie Parnell; (Australia) Ellyse Perry; (England) Cecily Scutt; (Australia) Asha Smith; (England) Susie Rowe	(England) Caroline Atkins (c); (England) Deanna Cooper; (England) Kate Cross; (Ireland) Catherine Dalton; (England) Jodie Dibble; (England) Amy Jones (wk); (England) Alice Macleod; (England) Natasha Miles; (England) Fi Morris; (England) Nat Sciver; (England) Hannah Shipman; (England) Fran Wilson	(England) Jenny Gunn (c); (England) Natalie Brown; (England) Holly Colvin; (England) Hannah Courtnell; (England) Phoebe Graham; (England) Madeline Green; (England) Lydia Greenway; (England) Alex Hartley; (England) Katie Levick; (England) Beth MacGregor; (England) Beth Morgan; (England) Hannah Phelps; (England) Anya Shrubsole; (England) Linsey Smith; (England) Sarah Taylor (wk)	(England) Heather Knight (c); (England) Arran Brindle; (England) Amara Carr (wk); (England) Alice Davidson-Richards; (Australia) Rhiannon Dick; (England) Georgia Elwiss; (England) Georgia Hennessy; (England) Sophie Luff; (England) Hayley Martinus; (England) Izi Noakes; (England) Sonia Odedra; (England) Lauren Winfield (wk); (England) Danni Wyatt

== 50 over ==
=== Results ===
19 May	Diamonds; 289/3 (50 overs)	v	Sapphires; 78 (28 overs)	Diamonds won by 211 runs
Scorecard	Diamonds; 289/3 (50 overs)	v	Sapphires; 78 (28 overs)	Haslegrave Ground, Loughborough; Umpires: Irving Lewis and Russell Warren
Scorecard	Charlotte Edwards 147 (152); Rhiannon Dick 2/59 (10 overs)		Lauren Winfield 15 (35); Beth Langston 7/23 (7 overs)	Haslegrave Ground, Loughborough; Umpires: Irving Lewis and Russell Warren
Diamonds won the toss and elected to bat.				Haslegrave Ground, Loughborough; Umpires: Irving Lewis and Russell Warren

19 May	Emeralds; 260/3 (50 overs)	v	Rubies; 233 (46.2 overs)	Emeralds won by 27 runs
Scorecard	Emeralds; 260/3 (50 overs)	v	Rubies; 233 (46.2 overs)	Brockington Ground, Loughborough; Umpires: Roger Newman and Ian Rich
Scorecard	Amy Jones 100* (119); Hannah Courtnell 2/54 (10 overs)		Jenny Gunn 81 (56); Kate Cross 3/43 (10 overs)	Brockington Ground, Loughborough; Umpires: Roger Newman and Ian Rich
Emeralds won the toss and elected to bat.				Brockington Ground, Loughborough; Umpires: Roger Newman and Ian Rich

20 May	Diamonds; 254/8 (50 overs)	v	Emeralds; 228/8 (50 overs)	Diamonds won by 26 runs
Scorecard	Diamonds; 254/8 (50 overs)	v	Emeralds; 228/8 (50 overs)	Oakham School, Oakham; Umpires: Paul Joy and Ray Medland
Scorecard	Tammy Beaumont 69 (89); Natasha Miles 4/51 (8.2 overs)		Nat Sciver 67* (57); Katherine Brunt 2/10 (7 overs)	Oakham School, Oakham; Umpires: Paul Joy and Ray Medland
Diamonds won the toss and elected to bat.				Oakham School, Oakham; Umpires: Paul Joy and Ray Medland

20 May	Rubies; 187 (50 overs)	v	Sapphires; 192/6 (50 overs)	Sapphires won by 5 runs
Scorecard	Rubies; 187 (50 overs)	v	Sapphires; 192/6 (50 overs)	Leicester Road, Hinckley; Umpires: Terry Dorr and Chris Johnson
Scorecard	Sarah Taylor 55 (78); Arran Brindle 6/30 (10 overs)		Lauren Winfield 55 (88); Alex Hartley 2/28 (10 overs)	Leicester Road, Hinckley; Umpires: Terry Dorr and Chris Johnson
Sapphires won the toss and elected to bat.				Leicester Road, Hinckley; Umpires: Terry Dorr and Chris Johnson

== Twenty20 ==
=== Semi-finals ===
12 May	Diamonds; 93/9 (20 overs)	v	Rubies; 97/2 (20 overs)	Rubies won by 8 wickets
Scorecard	Diamonds; 93/9 (20 overs)	v	Rubies; 97/2 (20 overs)	Brockington Ground, Loughborough; Umpires: Richard Ludlum and Steve Massingham
Scorecard	Katherine Brunt 55 (49); Anya Shrubsole 2/4 (4 overs)		Beth Morgan 37 (45); Thea Brookes 1/13 (3 overs)	Brockington Ground, Loughborough; Umpires: Richard Ludlum and Steve Massingham
Rubies won the toss and elected to field.; Rubies progress to the final.				Brockington Ground, Loughborough; Umpires: Richard Ludlum and Steve Massingham

12 May	Emeralds; 111/7 (20 overs)	v	Sapphires; 112/3 (18.4 overs)	Sapphires won by 7 wickets
Scorecard	Emeralds; 111/7 (20 overs)	v	Sapphires; 112/3 (18.4 overs)	Haslegrave Ground, Loughborough; Umpires: Dan Pedley and Russell Warren
Scorecard	Nat Sciver 26 (30); Rhiannon Dick 3/11 (4 overs)		Danni Wyatt 49 (46); Deanna Cooper 1/18 (2 overs)	Haslegrave Ground, Loughborough; Umpires: Dan Pedley and Russell Warren
Sapphires won the toss and elected to field.; Sapphires progress to the final.				Haslegrave Ground, Loughborough; Umpires: Dan Pedley and Russell Warren

=== Third-place play-off ===
12 May	Diamonds; 167/2 (20 overs)	v	Emeralds; 119/6 (20 overs)	Diamonds won by 48 runs
Scorecard	Diamonds; 167/2 (20 overs)	v	Emeralds; 119/6 (20 overs)	Brockington Ground, Loughborough; Umpires: Richard Ludlum and Steve Massingham
Scorecard	Tammy Beaumont 81 (57); Fi Morris 2/35 (4 overs)		Amy Jones 39* (34); Daisy Gardner 1/8 (2 overs)	Brockington Ground, Loughborough; Umpires: Richard Ludlum and Steve Massingham
Emeralds won the toss and elected to field.				Brockington Ground, Loughborough; Umpires: Richard Ludlum and Steve Massingham

=== Final ===
12 May	Rubies; 113/4 (19.2 overs)	v	Sapphires; 110/6 (20 overs)	Rubies won by 6 wickets
Scorecard	Rubies; 113/4 (19.2 overs)	v	Sapphires; 110/6 (20 overs)	Haslegrave Ground, Loughborough; Umpires: Dan Pedley and Russell Warren
Scorecard	Lydia Greenway 50 (41); Arran Brindle 2/23 (4 overs)		Heather Knight 37 (35); Jenny Gunn 2/16 (4 overs)	Haslegrave Ground, Loughborough; Umpires: Dan Pedley and Russell Warren
Rubies won the toss and elected to field.; Rubies won the Super Fours Twenty20 2012.				Haslegrave Ground, Loughborough; Umpires: Dan Pedley and Russell Warren
