= 2011 Super Fours =

- Administrator(s): England and Wales Cricket Board
- Cricket format: 50 over
- Tournament format(s): League system
- Champions: No overall winner
- Participants: 4
- Matches: 4
- Most runs: Charlotte Edwards, Diamonds (195)
- Most wickets: Holly Colvin, Rubies (7)

The 2011 Super Fours was the eighth cricket Super Fours season. This was the first time the competition had been played since 2008, having been cancelled in 2009 and 2010 due to a busy international schedule. It took place in May and saw 4 teams compete in 50 over and Twenty20 matches. There was no overall winner in the 50 over tournament, whilst Sapphires won the Twenty20 tournament, their third title in the format.

== Competition format ==
In the one day tournament, each team played two games, with no overall winner declared.

The Twenty20 competition consisted of two semi-finals, with the winners progressing to a Final and the losers playing in a third-place play-off.

== Teams ==
Diamonds	Emeralds	Rubies	Sapphires
(England) Charlotte Edwards (c); (England) Thea Brookes; (England) Katherine Brunt; (England) Deanna Cooper; (England) Hannah Courtnell; (England) Daisy Gardner; (England) Danielle Hazell; (England) Amy Jones (wk); (England) Beth Langston; (England) Alice Macleod; (England) Charlie Russell; (England) Dee Tress; (England) Fran Wilson; (England) Lauren Winfield (wk)	(England) Jo Cook (c); (England) Tammy Beaumont (wk); (England) Deanna Cooper; (England) Aylish Cranstone; (England) Kathryn Doherty; (England) Georgia Elwiss; (England) Jenny Halstead; (England) Alex Hartley; (England) Sophie Luff; (England) Beth MacGregor; (England) Natasha Miles; (England) Lily Reynolds; (England) Susie Rowe; (England) Helen Shipman; (England) Izzy Westbury	(England) Holly Colvin (c); (England) Caroline Atkins; (England) Natalie Brown; (England) Raveena Lakhtaria; (England) Katie Levick; (England) Sonia Odedra; (England) Hannah Phelps; (England) Nat Sciver; (England) Anya Shrubsole; (England) Linsey Smith; (England) Sarah Taylor (wk); (England) Laura Tonks (wk); (England) Lucy Uncles	(England) Heather Knight (c); (Ireland) Catherine Dalton; (England) Alice Davidson-Richards; (England) Phoebe Graham; (England) Lauren Griffiths (wk); (England) Laura Marsh; (England) Izi Noakes; (England) Lauren Onojaife; (South Africa) Amanda Potgieter; (England) Ebony Rainford-Brent; (England) Jasmine Titmuss; (England) Danni Wyatt

== 50 over ==
=== Results ===
7 May	Diamonds; 194/8 (40 overs)	v	Sapphires; 162 (39.3 overs)	Diamonds won by 32 runs
Scorecard	Diamonds; 194/8 (40 overs)	v	Sapphires; 162 (39.3 overs)	Haslegrave Ground, Loughborough; Umpires: Katherine Coultate and Paul Stratford
Scorecard	Charlotte Edwards 41 (44); Laura Marsh 2/33 (8 overs)		Ebony Rainford-Brent 66 (86); Hannah Courtnell 3/18 (5 overs)	Haslegrave Ground, Loughborough; Umpires: Katherine Coultate and Paul Stratford
Match reduced to 40 overs per side.				Haslegrave Ground, Loughborough; Umpires: Katherine Coultate and Paul Stratford

7 May	Emeralds; 94 (40 overs)	v	Rubies; 97/1 (22.3 overs)	Rubies won by 9 wickets
Scorecard	Emeralds; 94 (40 overs)	v	Rubies; 97/1 (22.3 overs)	Brockington Ground, Loughborough; Umpires: Brian Jones and Richard Ludlum
Scorecard	Kathryn Doherty 24 (53); Katie Levick 3/19 (7.2 overs)		Nat Sciver 47* (72); Izzy Westbury 1/29 (5 overs)	Brockington Ground, Loughborough; Umpires: Brian Jones and Richard Ludlum
Match reduced to 40 overs per side.				Brockington Ground, Loughborough; Umpires: Brian Jones and Richard Ludlum

14 May	Diamonds; 307/3 (50 overs)	v	Emeralds; 253/5 (50 overs)	Diamonds won by 54 runs
Scorecard	Diamonds; 307/3 (50 overs)	v	Emeralds; 253/5 (50 overs)	Brockington Ground, Loughborough; Umpires: Brian Hicklin and Irving Lewis
Scorecard	Charlotte Edwards 154 (149); Jenny Halstead 2/47 (8 overs)		Tammy Beaumont 128 (139); Deanna Cooper 1/22 (6 overs)	Brockington Ground, Loughborough; Umpires: Brian Hicklin and Irving Lewis
Diamonds won the toss and elected to bat.				Brockington Ground, Loughborough; Umpires: Brian Hicklin and Irving Lewis

14 May	Rubies; 173/8 (50 overs)	v	Sapphires; 75 (35.2 overs)	Rubies won by 98 runs
Scorecard	Rubies; 173/8 (50 overs)	v	Sapphires; 75 (35.2 overs)	Haslegrave Ground, Loughborough
Scorecard	Nat Sciver 57 (92); Izi Noakes 3/30 (9 overs)		Ebony Rainford-Brent 16 (44); Holly Colvin 5/14 (10 overs)	Haslegrave Ground, Loughborough
Rubies won the toss and elected to bat.				Haslegrave Ground, Loughborough

== Twenty20 ==
=== Semi-finals ===
2 May	Diamonds; 144/7 (20 overs)	v	Rubies; 147/6 (20 overs)	Rubies won by 3 runs
Scorecard	Diamonds; 144/7 (20 overs)	v	Rubies; 147/6 (20 overs)	Kibworth Cricket Club New Ground, Kibworth; Umpires: Paul Pollard and Paul Joy
Scorecard	Charlotte Edwards 62 (44); Holly Colvin 4/19 (4 overs)		Caroline Atkins 40 (26); Beth Langston 1/16 (2 overs)	Kibworth Cricket Club New Ground, Kibworth; Umpires: Paul Pollard and Paul Joy
Diamonds won the toss and elected to field.; Rubies progress to the final.				Kibworth Cricket Club New Ground, Kibworth; Umpires: Paul Pollard and Paul Joy

2 May	Emeralds; 98 (19.5 overs)	v	Sapphires; 99/2 (17.4 overs)	Sapphires won by 8 wickets
Scorecard	Emeralds; 98 (19.5 overs)	v	Sapphires; 99/2 (17.4 overs)	Kibworth Cricket Club New Ground, Kibworth; Umpires: Keith Parsons and John Hayes
Scorecard	Helen Shipman 21 (19); Amanda Potgieter 2/14 (4 overs)		Heather Knight 47* (49); Georgia Elwiss 1/19 (4 overs)	Kibworth Cricket Club New Ground, Kibworth; Umpires: Keith Parsons and John Hayes
Sapphires won the toss and elected to field.; Sapphires progress to the final.				Kibworth Cricket Club New Ground, Kibworth; Umpires: Keith Parsons and John Hayes

=== Third-place play-off ===
2 May	Diamonds; 121/7 (20 overs)	v	Emeralds; 117/3 (20 overs)	Diamonds won by 3 wickets
Scorecard	Diamonds; 121/7 (20 overs)	v	Emeralds; 117/3 (20 overs)	Kibworth Cricket Club New Ground, Kibworth; Umpires: Keith Parsons and John Hayes
Scorecard	Charlotte Edwards 58 (36); Deanna Cooper 3/25 (4 overs)		Helen Shipman 43* (44); Alice Macleod 1/17 (3 overs)	Kibworth Cricket Club New Ground, Kibworth; Umpires: Keith Parsons and John Hayes
Diamonds won the toss and elected to field.				Kibworth Cricket Club New Ground, Kibworth; Umpires: Keith Parsons and John Hayes

=== Final ===
2 May	Rubies; 125/7 (20 overs)	v	Sapphires; 126/2 (18.2 overs)	Sapphires won by 8 wickets
Scorecard	Rubies; 125/7 (20 overs)	v	Sapphires; 126/2 (18.2 overs)	Kibworth Cricket Club New Ground, Kibworth; Umpires: Paul Joy and Paul Pollard
Scorecard	Holly Colvin 39 (23); Amanda Potgieter 2/13 (4 overs)		Danni Wyatt 47 (40); Raveena Lakhtaria 1/15 (3 overs)	Kibworth Cricket Club New Ground, Kibworth; Umpires: Paul Joy and Paul Pollard
Sapphires won the Super Fours Twenty20 2011.				Kibworth Cricket Club New Ground, Kibworth; Umpires: Paul Joy and Paul Pollard
