= Thea Brookes =

English cricketer

Personal information
- Full name: Thea Francis Brookes
- Born: 15 February 1993 (age 33); Wordsley, West Midlands, England
- Batting: Right-handed
- Bowling: Right-arm off break
- Role: All-rounder

Domestic team information
- Years: Team
- 2005–2017: Worcestershire
- 2016–2017: Loughborough Lightning
- 2018–2022: Warwickshire
- 2018: Yorkshire Diamonds
- 2019: Southern Vipers
- 2020–2022: Central Sparks
- 2021: Birmingham Phoenix
- 2023–present: Surrey

Career statistics
Competition	WLA	WT20
Matches	92	100
Runs scored	1,867	1,837
Batting average	23.04	24.49
100s/50s	2/7	0/11
Top score	128	79*
Balls bowled	2,054	729
Wickets	63	32
Bowling average	21.15	19.50
5 wickets in innings	0	0
10 wickets in match	0	0
Best bowling	4/26	3/16
Catches/stumpings	36/–	21/–
- Source: CricketArchive, 23 October 2023

Thea Francis Brookes (born 15 February 1993) is an English cricketer who currently plays for Surrey. An all-rounder, she plays as a right-handed batter and right-arm off break bowler. She previously played for Worcestershire, Warwickshire and Central Sparks, as well as Loughborough Lightning, Yorkshire Diamonds and Southern Vipers in the Women's Cricket Super League and Birmingham Phoenix in The Hundred.

== Domestic career ==
Brookes made her county debut in 2005, for Worcestershire against Warwickshire. Brookes began to play regularly for Worcestershire in the 2009 season, and hit 224 runs in the County Championship that season, at an average of 37.33. In 2011, she was the seventh-highest run-scorer across the whole County Championship, with 363 runs at an average of 51.85, as well as hitting 141 runs, the most for Worcestershire, in the Twenty20 Cup. In 2013, Brookes hit her maiden county century, scoring 110* against Wales, as well as taking her List A best bowling figures, of 4/26 against Somerset. She was also the joint-second leading wicket-taker across the whole County Championship that season, with 18 wickets. In 2015 and 2016, Brookes was successful in the Twenty20 Cup, scoring 260 (third highest overall) and 270 (second highest) runs, respectively. She also hit her List A high score in 2016, with 128 against Leicestershire.

In 2018, Brookes joined Warwickshire, hitting 168 runs at an average of 33.60 in the County Championship that season. In 2019, she helped her side to the title in the Twenty20 Cup, scoring 157 runs at an average of 31.40. She was the side's second-highest run-scorer in the 2022 Women's Twenty20 Cup, with 147 runs including one half-century, as well as taking four wickets. She joined Surrey for the 2023 Women's Twenty20 Cup, taking three wickets in the competition.

Brookes also played in the Women's Cricket Super League in all four seasons. In 2016, she played for Loughborough Lightning, helping them reach the semi-final and scoring 43 runs. She continued playing for the side in 2017, and hit 48 runs in 5 innings that season. In 2018, she moved to Yorkshire Diamonds, hitting her WCSL high score of 45* against Southern Vipers and taking 3 wickets. Brookes joined Southern Vipers for the 2019 season, playing 7 matches and scoring 43 runs.

In 2020, Brookes played for Central Sparks in the Rachael Heyhoe Flint Trophy. She appeared in three matches, scoring 10 runs and taking 2 wickets at an average of 21.50. In 2021, Brookes played ten matches for the side across the Rachael Heyhoe Flint Trophy and the Charlotte Edwards Cup, with a top score of 33 in her side's Rachael Heyhoe Flint Trophy victory over South East Stars. She was also in the Birmingham Phoenix squad for The Hundred, but did not play a match and was not retained for the 2022 season. She played five matches for Central Sparks in 2022, across the Charlotte Edwards Cup and the Rachael Heyhoe Flint Trophy. Ahead of the 2023 season, it was confirmed that Brookes had left Central Sparks.

Brookes also appeared in the Super Fours in 2011 and 2012, for Diamonds.
