= 2013 Super Fours =

- Administrator(s): England and Wales Cricket Board
- Cricket format: 50 over
- Tournament format(s): League system
- Champions: No overall winner
- Participants: 4
- Matches: 4
- Most runs: Amy Jones, Rubies (120)
- Most wickets: Kate Cross, Sapphires (4)

The 2013 Super Fours was the tenth cricket Super Fours season. It took place in June and saw 4 teams compete in 50 over and Twenty20 matches. The four teams that competed in previous years were condensed into three, and Leicestershire and Rutland Under-16 Boys replaced Diamonds. There was no overall winner in the 50 over tournament, whilst Sapphires won the Twenty20 tournament, their fourth title in the format.

== Competition format ==
In the one day tournament, each team played two games, with no overall winner declared.

The Twenty20 competition consisted of two semi-finals, with the winners progressing to a Final and the losers playing in a third-place play-off.

== Teams ==
Emeralds	Leicestershire and Rutland Under-16 Boys	Rubies	Sapphires
(England) Heather Knight (c); (England) Tammy Beaumont (wk); (England) Arran Brindle; (England) Alice Davidson-Richards; (England) Alex Hartley; (England) Beth Langston; (England) Sophie Luff; (England) Carla Rudd (wk); (England) Nat Sciver; (England) Cecily Scutt; (England) Anya Shrubsole; (England) Linsey Smith; (England) Sarah Taylor (wk)	(England) Sam Nightingale (c); (England) Chris Chipman; (England) Ben Coddington (wk); (England) Joe Hack; (England) Jack Hall-Martinez; (England) Salman Mir; (England) Mackenzie Moore; (England) Harrison Norton; (England) Yuvraj Odedra; (England) Jai Pandit; (England) Teddy Read; (England) Milan Shah; (England) Cameron Sharp; (England) Ben Silver; (England) Harry Swindells (wk); (England) Samuel Ward; (England) Kieran Wordsworth (wk); (England) Cameron Yates	(England) Lydia Greenway (c); (England) Deanna Cooper; (England) Gwenan Davies (wk); (England) Georgia Elwiss; (England) Grace Gibbs; (England) Rebecca Grundy; (England) Jenny Gunn; (England) Amy Jones (wk); (England) Marie Kelly; (England) Fi Morris; (England) Izi Noakes; (England) Sonia Odedra; (England) Fran Wilson; (England) Lauren Winfield (wk)	(England) Charlotte Edwards (c); (England) Amara Carr (wk); (England) Kate Cross; (Ireland) Catherine Dalton; (England) Tash Farrant; (England) Cordelia Griffith; (England) Danielle Hazell; (England) Georgia Hennessy; (England) Marie Kelly; (England) Natasha Miles; (England) Sonia Odedra; (England) Nalisha Patel; (England) Elizabeth Reynolds; (England) Susie Rowe; (England) Danni Wyatt

== 50 over ==
=== Results ===
8 June	Emeralds; 185/4 (39.1 overs)	v	Sapphires; 184/6 (50 overs)	Emeralds won by 6 wickets
Scorecard	Emeralds; 185/4 (39.1 overs)	v	Sapphires; 184/6 (50 overs)	Haslegrave Ground, Loughborough; Umpires: C Johnson and Russell Warren
Scorecard	Arran Brindle 66* (102); Sonia Odedra 2/26 (8 overs)		Natasha Miles 69 (124); Beth Langston 2/32 (10 overs)	Haslegrave Ground, Loughborough; Umpires: C Johnson and Russell Warren
Emeralds won the toss and elected to field.				Haslegrave Ground, Loughborough; Umpires: C Johnson and Russell Warren

8 June	Leicestershire and Rutland U16 Boys; 160/9 (50 overs)	v	Rubies; 248/5 (50 overs)	Rubies won by 88 runs
Scorecard	Leicestershire and Rutland U16 Boys; 160/9 (50 overs)	v	Rubies; 248/5 (50 overs)	Brockington Ground, Loughborough
Scorecard	Ben Coddington 52 (94); Gwenan Davies 3/34 (10 overs)		Amy Jones 120* (144); Salman Mir 2/35 (10 overs)	Brockington Ground, Loughborough
Rubies won the toss and elected to bat.				Brockington Ground, Loughborough

15 June	Emeralds; 175 (45 overs)	v	Rubies	No Result
Scorecard	Emeralds; 175 (45 overs)	v	Rubies	Brockington Ground, Loughborough; Umpires: Adam Hitchcock and Dan Pedley
Scorecard	Heather Knight 73 (111); Georgia Elwiss 3/25 (10 overs)			Brockington Ground, Loughborough; Umpires: Adam Hitchcock and Dan Pedley
Rubies won the toss and elected to field.; Rubies innings curtailed due to rain.				Brockington Ground, Loughborough; Umpires: Adam Hitchcock and Dan Pedley

15 June	Leicestershire and Rutland U16 Boys; 158 (49.4 overs)	v	Sapphires; 129/2 (29.1 overs)	Sapphires won by 8 wickets (D/L)
Scorecard	Leicestershire and Rutland U16 Boys; 158 (49.4 overs)	v	Sapphires; 129/2 (29.1 overs)	Haslegrave Ground, Loughborough; Umpires: Richard Ludlum and Rob Newman
Scorecard	Sam Nightingale 50 (109); Kate Cross 4/30 (9.4 overs)		Charlotte Edwards 67 (79); Jai Pandit 1/12 (4 overs)	Haslegrave Ground, Loughborough; Umpires: Richard Ludlum and Rob Newman
Sapphires won the toss and elected to field.; Sapphires innings reduced to 32 overs.				Haslegrave Ground, Loughborough; Umpires: Richard Ludlum and Rob Newman

== Twenty20 ==
=== Semi-finals ===
1 June	Emeralds; 108/3 (19.1 overs)	v	Leicestershire and Rutland U16 Boys; 104/9 (20 overs)	Emeralds won by 7 wickets
Scorecard	Emeralds; 108/3 (19.1 overs)	v	Leicestershire and Rutland U16 Boys; 104/9 (20 overs)	Brockington Ground, Loughborough; Umpires: Adam Hitchcock and Dan Pedley
Scorecard	Arran Brindle 58* (61); Yuvraj Odedra 2/11 (3.1 overs)		Jai Pandit 36* (47); Anya Shrubsole 2/13 (4 overs)	Brockington Ground, Loughborough; Umpires: Adam Hitchcock and Dan Pedley
Emeralds won the toss and elected to field.; Emeralds progress to the final.				Brockington Ground, Loughborough; Umpires: Adam Hitchcock and Dan Pedley

1 June	Rubies; 89/8 (20 overs)	v	Sapphires; 90/1 (13.4 overs)	Sapphires won by 9 wickets
Scorecard	Rubies; 89/8 (20 overs)	v	Sapphires; 90/1 (13.4 overs)	Haslegrave Ground, Loughborough; Umpires: Trevor Riley and Kevin Smyth
Scorecard	Lydia Greenway 25 (37); Danielle Hazell 2/10 (4 overs)		Charlotte Edwards 45* (43); Rebecca Grundy 1/20 (2.4 overs)	Haslegrave Ground, Loughborough; Umpires: Trevor Riley and Kevin Smyth
Sapphires won the toss and elected to field.; Sapphires progress to the final.				Haslegrave Ground, Loughborough; Umpires: Trevor Riley and Kevin Smyth

=== Third-place play-off ===
1 June	Leicestershire and Rutland U16 Boys; 108/4 (20 overs)	v	Rubies; 109/4 (18.2 overs)	Rubies won by 6 wickets
Scorecard	Leicestershire and Rutland U16 Boys; 108/4 (20 overs)	v	Rubies; 109/4 (18.2 overs)	Brockington Ground, Loughborough; Umpires: Adam Hitchcock and Dan Pedley
Scorecard	Cameron Yates 39 (50); Sonia Odedra 1/15 (4 overs)		Lauren Winfield 56* (46); Yuvraj Odedra 1/8 (2.2 overs)	Brockington Ground, Loughborough; Umpires: Adam Hitchcock and Dan Pedley
Leicestershire and Rutland U16 Boys won the toss and elected to bat.				Brockington Ground, Loughborough; Umpires: Adam Hitchcock and Dan Pedley

=== Final ===
1 June	Emeralds; 108/3 (20 overs)	v	Sapphires; 112/5 (19.4 overs)	Sapphires won by 5 wickets
Scorecard	Emeralds; 108/3 (20 overs)	v	Sapphires; 112/5 (19.4 overs)	Haslegrave Ground, Loughborough; Umpires: Trevor Riley and Kevin Smyth
Scorecard	Arran Brindle 44 (38); Danielle Hazell 2/17 (4 overs)		Natasha Miles 41 (37); Nat Sciver 2/18 (2.4 overs)	Haslegrave Ground, Loughborough; Umpires: Trevor Riley and Kevin Smyth
Sapphires won the toss and elected to field.; Sapphires won the Super Fours Twenty20 2013				Haslegrave Ground, Loughborough; Umpires: Trevor Riley and Kevin Smyth
