= Sapphires (Super Fours) =

English women's cricket team

Personnel
- Captain: Charlotte Edwards (2013); Heather Knight (2011–2012); Alexia Walker (2008); Rosalie Birch (2007); Laura Newton (2004–2006); Clare Taylor (2002–2003)

Team information
- Colours: Dark blue
- Established: 2002

History
- SF50 wins: 3
- SFT20 wins: 4

Sapphires, previously known as V Team, were an English women's cricket team that competed in the Super Fours. The squad varied from season to season, but was made up of some of the top players in English cricket. They were captained by various England players, such as Clare Taylor, Laura Newton and Heather Knight. They won seven Super Fours titles in their history: three 50-over tournaments and four Twenty20 tournaments.

== History ==
=== 2002–2005: V Team ===
The Super Fours was established in 2002 as a way of bridging the gap between women's county cricket and international cricket, bringing together the top players in England. V Team was one of the teams established, and was captained by Clare Taylor. They finished 3rd in the first 50 over tournament that took place, winning 3 out of 6 games. After finished 4th in 2003, V Team quickly became a strong side in the Super Fours, winning both the 50 over and the newly-established Twenty20 tournament in 2004. They won the Twenty20 tournament again a year later in 2005, going unbeaten to top the group.

=== 2006–2013: Sapphires ===
In 2006 the team was renamed Sapphires and continued their form, winning their second 50 over title, with batter Claire Taylor finishing the season as leading run-scorer. They claimed another 50 over title in 2008, as well as two more Twenty20 titles, in 2011 and 2013. Sapphires therefore ended the Super Fours as the most successful side, with 7 titles.

== Seasons ==
=== Super Fours ===
Season	League standings							Notes
Season	P	W	L	T	A	Pts	Pos	Notes
2002	6	3	3	0	0	36	3rd	
2003	6	1	4	0	1	12	4th	
2004	6	3	2	1	0	51	1st	Champions
2005	6	2	3	1	0	36	3rd	
2006	6	4	2	2	0	74	1st	Champions
2007	6	0	5	0	1	11	4th	
2008	6	3	1	2	0	74	1st	Champions
2011	2	0	2	0	0	–	–	No overall standings
2012	2	1	1	0	0	–	–	No overall standings
2013	2	1	1	0	0	–	–	No overall standings

=== Super Fours Twenty20 ===
Year	Played	Wins	Losses	Tied	NR	Standing
2004	2	2	0	0	0	Beat Braves in the final
2005	3	3	0	0	0	1st in group
2006	2	1	1	0	0	Lost to Diamonds in the final
2007	Tournament Abandoned					
2008	2	1	1	0	0	Won 3rd place play-off
2011	2	2	0	0	0	Beat Rubies in the final
2012	2	1	1	0	0	Lost to Rubies in the final
2013	2	2	0	0	0	Beat Emeralds in the final
