= Susie Rowe =

English cricketer

Personal information
- Full name: Susannah Elizabeth Rowe
- Born: 14 April 1987 (age 39); Lewisham, Greater London, England
- Batting: Right-handed
- Bowling: Right-arm medium
- Role: Batter

International information
- National side: England (2010–2013)
- Only ODI (cap 119): 9 January 2011 v Australia
- T20I debut (cap 27): 19 November 2010 v Sri Lanka
- Last T20I: 5 July 2013 v Pakistan

Domestic team information
- Years: Team
- 2004–2012: Kent
- 2013–2015: Surrey
- 2020–2021: Kent
- 2020–2021: South East Stars
- 2021: London Spirit

Career statistics
Competition	WODI	WT20I	WLA	WT20
Matches	1	22	80	60
Runs scored	–	126	1,425	809
Batting average	–	21.00	33.13	26.96
100s/50s	–/–	0/0	0/6	0/3
Top score	–	29*	92	67
Balls bowled	–	–	138	84
Wickets	–	–	4	5
Bowling average	–	–	24.75	17.00
5 wickets in innings	–	–	0	0
10 wickets in match	–	–	0	0
Best bowling	–	–	1/1	2/11
Catches/stumpings	0/–	4/–	20/–	14/–
- Source: CricketArchive, 1 November 2021

Susannah Elizabeth Rowe (born 14 April 1987) is an English former cricketer who played as a right-handed batter who bowled occasional right-arm medium pace. She played for England in 1 One Day International and 22 Twenty20 Internationals between 2010 and 2013. She played domestic cricket for Kent, Surrey, South East Stars and London Spirit.

== Early life ==
Rowe was born on 14 April 1987 in Lewisham, Greater London.

== Domestic career ==
In county cricket, Rowe played for Kent from 2004 to 2012, helping them to the County Championship title in 2004, 2006, 2009, 2011 and 2012 as well as the Twenty20 Cup in 2011.

Rowe moved to Surrey ahead of the 2013 season. She made her county high score of 92 in the 2013 County Championship Division One Relegation Play-Off against Essex, helping her side to a 5-wicket win to retain their Division One status.

Rowe also played for various teams in the now-defunct Super Fours competition, including Knight Riders, Rubies, Emeralds, Diamonds and Sapphires.

Rowe stopped playing county cricket after the 2015 season but made a surprise return in 2020, playing two matches for Kent before joining South East Stars for the Rachael Heyhoe Flint Trophy. She scored 79 runs in four matches for the Stars. She made three appearances for the side in 2021, in the Stars' successful Charlotte Edwards Cup campaign. She was also in the London Spirit's squad for The Hundred, playing three matches.

Rowe announced her retirement from all forms of cricket in November 2021.

== International career ==
Rowe made her England debut in a Twenty20 International against Sri Lanka at Nondescripts Cricket Club Ground, Colombo on 19 November 2010. She did not bat or bowl in an 8-wicket win for England.

Her sole One Day International came against Australia at the WACA, Perth on 9 January 2011. She did not bat or bowl in a 7-wicket win for England.

She made her international high score of 29* from just 15 balls in a Twenty20 International against Pakistan at Haslegrave Ground, Loughborough on 5 September 2012. Her final game for England was a Twenty20 International against Pakistan at the same ground on 5 July 2013. Across her 22 Twenty20 Internationals she batted 10 times, scoring 126 runs at an average of 21.00 and a strike-rate of 107.69.

== Personal life ==
Rowe is a talented hockey player, having represented England at under-21 level. She previously represented Canterbury Hockey Club in the Women's England Hockey League Premier Division and currently plays for Sevenoaks Hockey Club in the second tier.

Rowe is the Head of Cricket at Radnor House School in Sevenoaks, Kent.
