= Steph Davies =

English cricketer

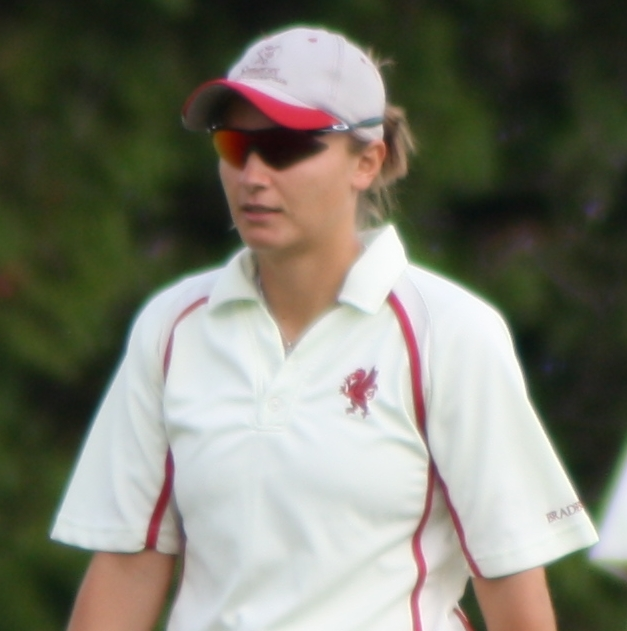
- Davies in 2010

Personal information
- Full name: Stephanie Ann Davies
- Born: 21 October 1987 (age 39); Aberdare, Glamorgan, Wales
- Nickname: Wales
- Height: 5 ft 7 in (1.70 m)
- Batting: Right-handed
- Bowling: Right-arm medium-fast

International information
- National side: England
- ODI debut (cap 111): 11 February 2008 v Australia
- Last ODI: 2 March 2008 v New Zealand

Domestic team information
- Years: Team
- 2001–2011: Somerset

Career statistics
Competition	WODI	WLA	WT20
Matches	4	86	13
Runs scored	2	1,224	94
Batting average	2.00	16.54	10.44
100s/50s	0/0	0/4	0/0
Top score	2	70	26
Balls bowled	180	3,233	207
Wickets	6	69	10
Bowling average	24.50	24.49	18.60
5 wickets in innings	0	0	0
10 wickets in match	0	0	0
Best bowling	4/47	4/5	4/21
Catches/stumpings	0/–	18/–	1/–
- Source: CricketArchive, 5 January 2021

Stephanie Ann Davies (born 21 October 1987) is a former international cricketer who represented England in four One Day Internationals (ODIs) as well as Somerset in county cricket. She was a right-arm medium-fast bowler and right-handed batter.

After making her county debut for Somerset at the age of 13, Davies quickly progressed into the England development and youth sides. She toured Australia with England Under-19s aged 15 and after two successful European tournaments, she captained the England Under-21s to victory in the 2006 Under-21 European Championships. After more matches for the development squad, and a number of tour matches for England, she made her ODI debut during the 2007–08 tour of Australia and New Zealand, playing the fifth and final one-day match against Australia, and three of the five matches against New Zealand. Following this, she continued to be involved in the England Academy, but did not make any further ODI appearances. In 2009, she took on the captaincy of Somerset.

== Career ==
=== Early years ===
After watching cricket with her father, Davies began playing Kwik cricket, and then played age-group cricket for local boys' teams, including Mountain Ash and Mid Glamorgan. At the age of 13, she took part in a women's trial match, and was selected to play with the older women cricketers in the South West of England. At this time, she began to play women's cricket for Somerset Wanderers as well as her boys' matches. She soon progressed into the Somerset county side, making her debut that same year, aged 13 against Lancashire. She played four of Somerset's five Women's County Championship matches in 2001, and claimed her first wicket for the side in the third of these, trapping Derbyshire's Jane Morris leg before wicket during an economical spell in which she conceded only five runs off four overs.

Davies progressed quickly into the England development squad, representing them in a 2002 match against British Universities Sports Association. She also played a match for Wales, helping her native country defeat Scotland by seven wickets. Although she did not appear for Somerset in the County Championship during the season, she did help Somerset Wanderers reach the semi-final of the ECB Women's National Knockout. In 2002, she made her first appearance in the Super Fours—a competition in which the England selectors place the 48 leading players into four teams—playing one match for the Knight Riders.

=== England Under-19 debut ===
She was chosen as part of the England Under-19s squad to tour Australia during the English winter of 2002–03, in which the England side took part in the Women's Australian Under-19 Championships. Davies had little impact in the competition, claiming two wickets from her nine overs, and scoring eleven runs during her two innings. She also played in one of the two matches against the Australia Under-19s side, bowling six overs in which she claimed one wicket.

In 2003, Davies was again selected for the Super Fours competition, appearing in three matches for the Braves without standing out. She played five County Championship matches for Somerset, moving up the batting order; after batting at number four in her first match of the season, she was promoted to open the innings for the remainder of the season. The move proved profitable, she passed her previous highest total during her first match in the new position, scoring 35 against Middlesex, and after a couple of lower totals, she made her highest score in women's List A cricket when she scored 70 against Hampshire. Despite this move she remained in the lower order on her next international appearance, a 50-over contest for the England development squad which served as a warm-up for the touring South Africa national women's cricket team. She claimed three wickets during her seven overs as the English side won by seven wickets.

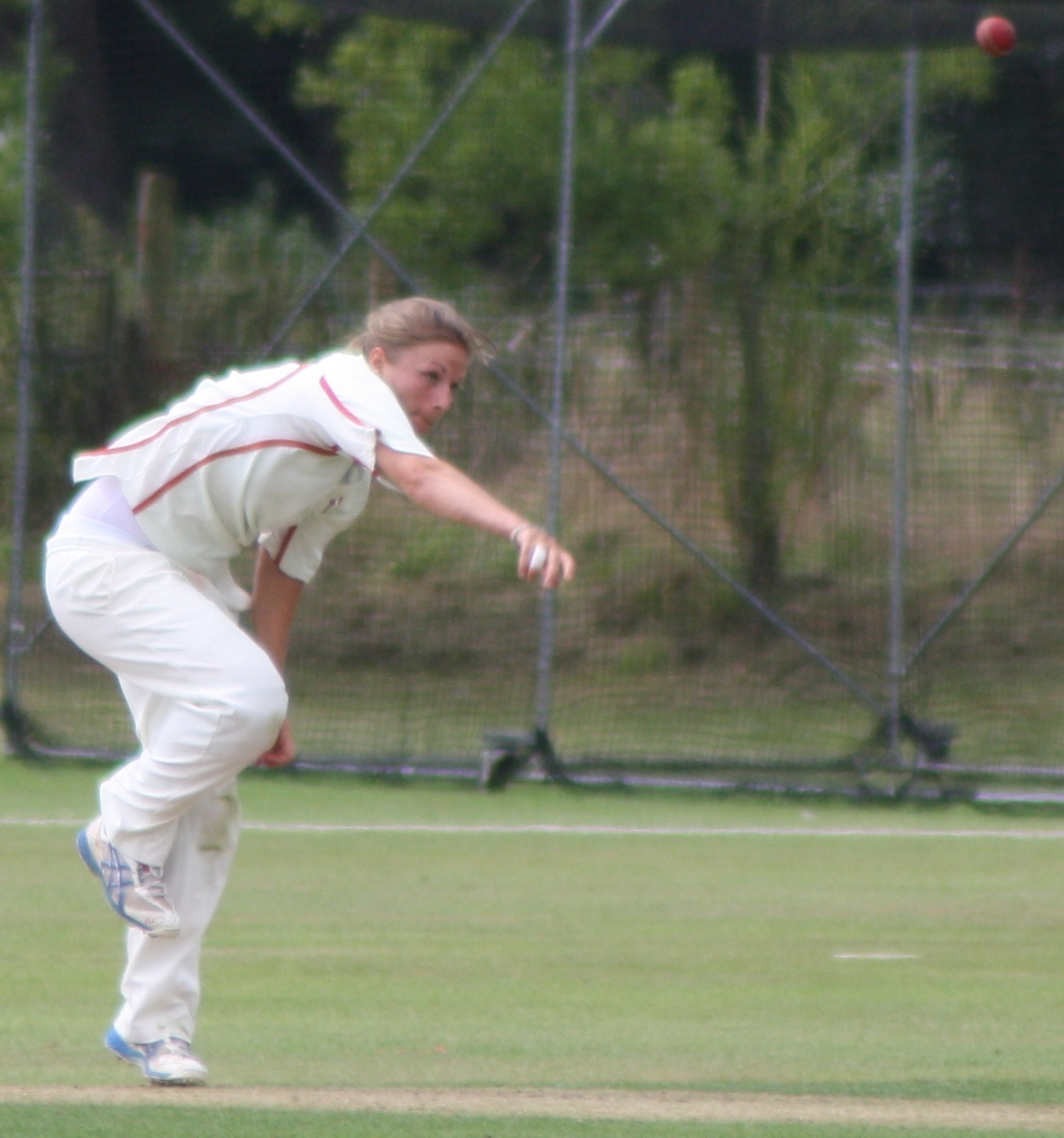
Davies bowling for Somerset in 2010

Twenty20 cricket was introduced into the English women's domestic game for the first time in 2004 as part of the Super Fours competition. Playing her first match of this format, Davies took four wickets for Braves, helping them to a 12 run victory in the semi-final of the competition. Davies had some success in the 50-over tournament; although she only claimed two wickets in her four matches, she boasted the third lowest economy rate. She continued to open the batting for Somerset, but did not pass 50 runs in a match during her four matches for the county. Upon the conclusion of the English domestic season, Davies travelled to Ireland as part of the England squad to compete in the 2004 Women's European Under-21 Championships. Davies played two different roles for England during the tournament; in the first match she was used purely as an opening batsman, scoring 25 runs off 27 balls to help chase down a small Scotland total of 57 in under 10 overs. In the subsequent two matches, she batted as part of the middle order, and bowled at least five overs in each match. Against the Netherlands, she bowled very economically, finishing with figures of 1/5 off her 5.3 overs. England won all three of their matches to win the competition.

During 2005, Davies passed 50 twice, making 65 against Nottinghamshire and 51 against Berkshire in the second half of the season. Due to her improved performances with the bat in the previous season, Davies was promoted to bat slightly higher in the order for the Braves, playing two matches at number five and two at number three. At the close of the season, she played for England A women in a match against the senior England side, scoring 8 runs after opening the batting. She was then selected as part of the England Development Squad to compete in the 2005 Women's European Championship in Wales. As with her appearances in the Under-21 European Championship, her role altered from match to match. On the two occasions on which she was asked to bat, she scored 23 at number three against Ireland, and 31 opening the innings against Netherlands. She finished the tournament as the leading bowler in terms of wickets, bowling average and economy. In total she claimed nine wickets in her four matches, coming at an average of 5.88. The highlight of her bowling came in the match against Scotland, when Davies collected four wickets in 6.2 overs, conceding just five runs during this time.

Davies had a reasonably quiet 2006 domestic season with both bat and ball. In four 50-over matches for Somerset she scored 34 runs at an average of 8.50, and took four wickets at an average of 33.75, taking a wicket in each match. Davies was again selected for the Super Fours, this time playing for the Emeralds. She made 74 runs at 14.80 in five matches with a highest score of 29, but was ineffective with the ball, taking 2 wickets at 74.00. Davies performed well for England A during a match against the touring Indian side, restricting the visitors to just fifteen runs off her ten overs, taking two wickets as she did so. Opening both the batting and bowling for England in this match, she then added an unbeaten 27, albeit off 77 balls, to help England A secure victory via the Duckworth–Lewis method. She was named as captain of the England Under-21 side for the 2006 Women's European Under-21 Championships, and led her side to three large victories to retain the competition title. She finished the tournament near the top of both the batting and bowling averages charts, boosted by her performance against Ireland, in which she took three wickets for just six runs conceded in her bowling duties, and followed it up with a score of 31 as her side chased a low Irish total of 69 to win.

=== Full international debut ===
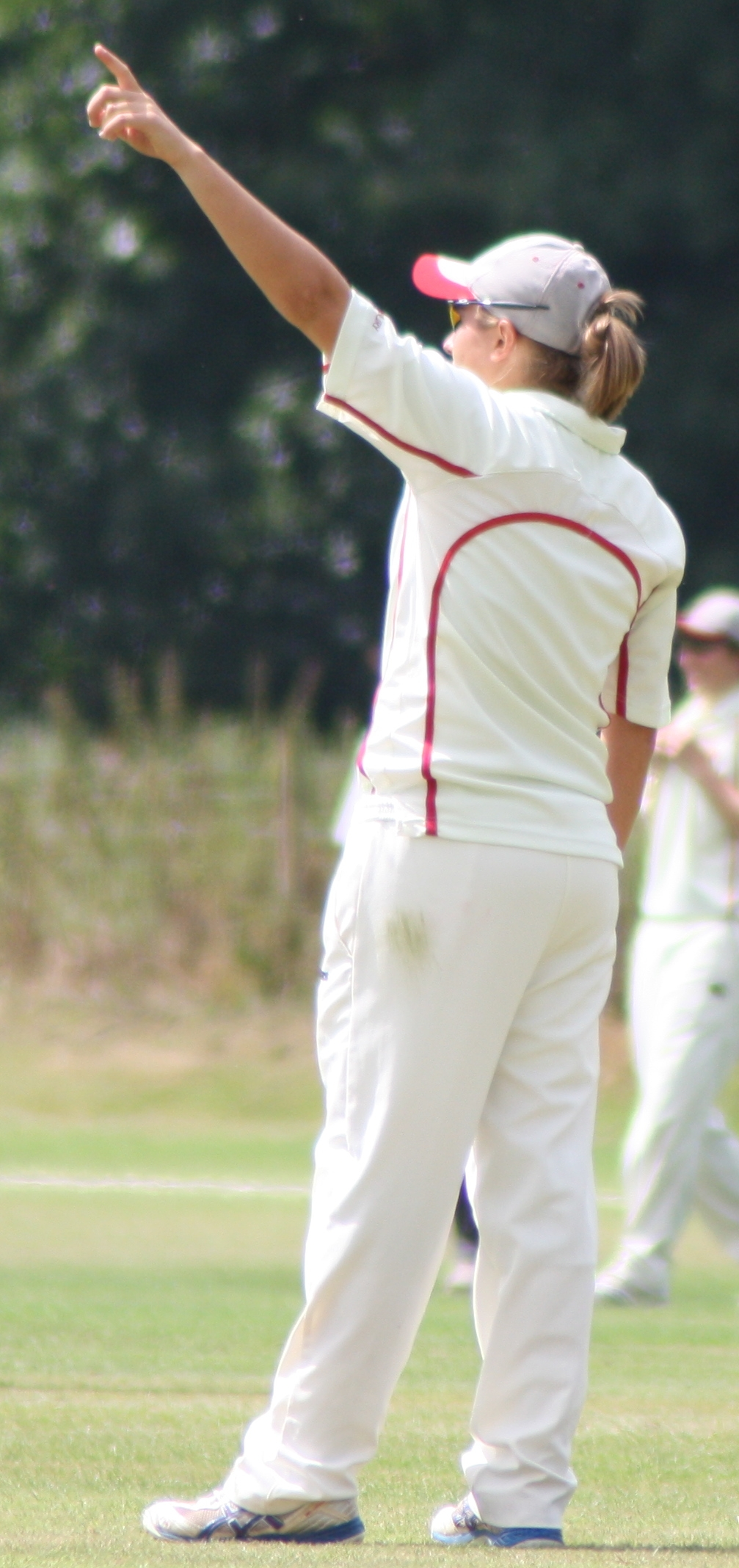
Davies directing the field as captain for Somerset in 2010

In June 2007, Davies made her first appearance for the senior England side, albeit in a non-international match against an England Cricket Board Invitational XI. She was not required to bat or bowl in the match, which England won by five wickets. As the English summer continued, she played three matches for the England development squad, making scores of 34 and 18 in matches against South Africa, and 15 against England. In November 2007, she was named as part of the England squad which travelled to Australia and New Zealand, her first tour as a member of the senior England side. She was selected to play in two of the three warm-up matches on the tour, but did not make her ODI debut until the fifth and final match of the series. Coming on to bowl as the first change, Davies claimed four wickets in her first international innings, trapping Lisa Sthalekar, Kate Blackwell and Leonie Coleman leg before wicket, and having Kirsten Pike stumped off the last ball of the innings. Despite her performance, Australia won the match by 41 runs. After playing the only warm-up match in New Zealand, in which she scored 25 from the lower order, Davies missed the first ODI, returning for the second. She bowled six wicket-less overs in this match, and was not required to bat as England chased down the hosts total for the loss of only one wicket. Her bowling was used slightly more in the next match, claiming the wicket of Amy Satterthwaite during her nine overs. As with the previous match, her batting was not required as England reached the required target with six wickets remaining. She added one more wicket the fourth ODI, but there was no result as the match was washed out, leaving Davies without a batting innings during the series.

In September 2007, Davies started studying Sport and Physical Education at the University of Wales Institute, Cardiff, meaning that she had to juggle her cricket career with her academic studies in 2008. She represented England sides twice, both in early August, playing for the academy against Ireland and for the development squad the following day against the senior England side. As an MCC Young Cricketer, she was also selected to play in an MCC side against India later in the same month. She played five Somerset's six County Championship matches, her best performance of the season coming against Warwickshire, when she claimed a wicket and scored 25 runs to help her county to victory. She also made one appearance in the Super Fours for Rubies.

=== Somerset captain ===
Davies was named Somerset captain for the 2009 season, taking over from Hannah Lloyd, who continued to play for the side. In her first match as captain—against Surrey on 10 May 2009—she scored a half-century, and shared a 128-run partnership with fellow opener Sophie Le Marchand, helping her side to a 21 run victory. That score remained her best of the season, and in a rebuilding season for the county, she finished as the leading run-scorer, with 217. She also finished the season as Somerset's most economical bowler, and her seven wickets meant that she trailed only Izzy Westbury among wicket-takers. She continued to play for both England Academy and MCC Young Cricketers, and represented the academy in two Twenty20 matches against Pakistan prior to the 2009 ICC Women's World Twenty20. She continued as captain in 2010, and in Somerset's opening fixture of the season, against Berkshire, she claimed her fourth List A four-wicket haul. She played her last match for Somerset in 2011 against Cheshire.

Sporting positions
Preceded by Hannah Lloyd	Somerset women's cricket captain 2009–2010	Succeeded by Moira Comfort
