= Nicky Shaw =

England cricketer

Personal information
- Full name: Nicola Jayne Shaw
- Born: 30 December 1981 (age 44); Nuneaton, Warwickshire, England
- Batting: Right-handed
- Bowling: Right-arm fast-medium
- Role: Bowler

International information
- National side: England (1999–2010)
- Test debut (cap 132): 24 June 2001 v Australia
- Last Test: 10 July 2009 v Australia
- ODI debut (cap 86): 19 July 1999 v Netherlands
- Last ODI: 1 March 2010 v India
- T20I debut (cap 9): 5 August 2004 v New Zealand
- Last T20I: 2 July 2010 v New Zealand

Domestic team information
- Years: Team
- 1998–1999: East Midlands
- 2000–2007: Nottinghamshire
- 2008–2010: Surrey
- 2011/12–2015/16: Western Australia
- 2015/16: Perth Scorchers

Career statistics
Competition	WTest	WODI	WT20I	WLA
Matches	5	70	22	206
Runs scored	48	353	83	2,246
Batting average	6.85	9.54	11.85	16.76
100s/50s	0/0	0/0	0/0	1/5
Top score	27	35	12*	118*
Balls bowled	795	2,394	456	8,147
Wickets	11	46	19	164
Bowling average	32.45	29.41	22.78	28.11
5 wickets in innings	0	0	0	0
10 wickets in match	0	0	0	0
Best bowling	3/67	4/34	3/17	4/17
Catches/stumpings	1/–	15/–	5/–	54/–
- Source: CricketArchive, 13 March 2021

Nicola Jayne Shaw (commonly either Nicky Shaw or Nicki Shaw, born 30 December 1981) is an English cricketer and former member of the England women's cricket team. She played for England from 1999 until 2010, making 97 international appearances. She was named as player of the match when England beat New Zealand in the 2009 Women's Cricket World Cup Final, taking a career-best four wickets for 34 runs. She retired from international cricket in 2010, ahead of a move to Australia, where she played domestic cricket until the end of the 2015–16 season.

== Biography ==
Shaw was born in Nuneaton, Warwickshire on 30 December 1981. She gained a degree in Criminology and Social Policy at Loughborough University. A right-handed batsman and right-arm fast-medium bowler, she made her debut in the Women's County Championship in 1998, appearing for the East Midlands. She was part of the East Midlands team that won the County Championship in 1999. Her international debut came the following summer, in the 1999 Women's European Championship. Facing the Netherlands, Shaw claimed one wicket and was not required to bat in a large win for England. Domestically, she played for Nottinghamshire from 2000 until 2007, and moved to Surrey in 2008, where she assumed the county captaincy. She scored her highest total in county cricket for Surrey, striking 118 runs off 133 balls against Berkshire in 2009. Her best bowling performance occurred during her time with Nottinghamshire, facing Surrey. From ten overs, Shaw claimed four wickets and conceded just 17 runs: one of only three four-wicket hauls in her career.

She played regularly for England from 2000 until 2010. She was named as England vice-captain in 2007. A year later, she was one of eight players to be awarded the first women's contracts from the England and Wales Cricket Board. She only appeared in half of the matches during the 2009 Women's Cricket World Cup, and had been omitted from the final until an injury to Jenny Gunn during the warm-up. Named to the team just minutes before the contest, she went on to collect a career-best four wickets for 34 runs, and scored 17 not out, earning herself the player of the match accolade. She was also part of the England team which won the 2009 ICC Women's World Twenty20, taking two wickets for 17 runs in the final. In addition to captaining Surrey, Shaw was selected to captain Diamonds during the 2007 Super Fours competition, and Emeralds in the subsequent 2008 tournament, designed to bring together the "top 48 players in England" in four teams. She also captained England on five occasions, deputising for Charlotte Edwards.

She retired from international cricket in July 2010 to give her time to prepare for a move to Australia. She took 46 wickets in Women's One Day International cricket at an average of 29.41, and 19 wickets in Women's Twenty20 Internationals at 22.78. She never passed 50 runs in an international match: her highest total in any international was 35, scored against New Zealand in 2000. In addition to winning the 2009 Women's Cricket World Cup and the 2009 ICC Women's World Twenty20, she was part of the England team that won The Women's Ashes in 2007–08. She played domestic cricket in Australia until the end of the 2015–16 season.
