= Rubies (Super Fours) =

English women's cricket team

Personnel
- Captain: Lydia Greenway (2013); Jenny Gunn (2012); Holly Colvin (2011); Gill Richards (2006–2008); Clare Connor (2002–2005)

Team information
- Colours: Red
- Established: 2002

History
- SF50 wins: 2
- SFT20 wins: 2

Rubies, previously known as Braves, were an English women's cricket team that competed in the Super Fours. The squad varied from season to season, but was made up of some of the top players in English cricket. They were captained by Clare Connor for their first four seasons, and were subsequently captained by various England players such as Lydia Greenway. They won four Super Fours titles in their history: two 50-over tournaments and two Twenty20 tournaments.

== History ==
=== 2002–2005: Braves ===
The Super Fours was established in 2002 as a way of bridging the gap between women's county cricket and international cricket, bringing together the top players in England. Braves was one of the teams established, and was captained by Clare Connor. They won the first 50 over tournament that took place, winning 4 out of 6 games.

Braves failed to replicate this form over the next few seasons, however, finishing 3rd, 2nd and 4th in 2003, 2004, 2005, respectively. They did reach the inaugural Twenty20 final in 2004, but lost to V Team by 8 wickets.

=== 2006–2013: Rubies ===
In 2006 the side was renamed Rubies and a season later, in 2007, they achieved their second title, winning all six of their games to win the 50 over tournament. Rubies batter Lydia Greenway was the tournament leading run-scorer, and bowler Holly Colvin was the leading wicket-taker, including taking 5/7 against Sapphires. Whilst they did not win the 50 over title again, they did add two Twenty20 titles to their honours list, winning in 2008 and 2012.

== Seasons ==
=== Super Fours ===
Season	League standings							Notes
Season	P	W	L	T	A	Pts	Pos	Notes
2002	6	4	2	0	0	48	1st	Champions
2003	6	2	3	0	1	24	3rd	
2004	6	3	3	0	0	45	2nd	
2005	6	1	5	0	0	15	4th	
2006	6	3	1	2	0	66	2nd	
2007	6	6	0	0	0	103	1st	Champions
2008	6	1	3	0	2	40	4th	
2011	2	2	0	0	0	–	–	No overall standings
2012	2	0	2	0	0	–	–	No overall standings
2013	2	1	0	0	1	–	–	No overall standings

=== Super Fours Twenty20 ===
Year	Played	Wins	Losses	Tied	NR	Standing
2004	2	1	1	0	0	Lost to V Team in the final
2005	3	0	3	0	0	4th in group
2006	2	0	2	0	0	4th
2007	Tournament Abandoned					
2008	2	2	0	0	0	Beat Diamonds in the final
2011	2	1	1	0	0	Lost to Sapphires in the final
2012	2	2	0	0	0	Beat Sapphires in the final
2013	2	1	1	0	0	Won 3rd place play-off
