= Jo Watts =

English cricketer (born 1987)

Personal information
- Full name: Joanna Karen Watts
- Born: 18 May 1987 (age 39); Maidstone, Kent, England
- Batting: Right-handed
- Bowling: Right-arm off break
- Role: Bowler

International information
- National side: England (2005)
- ODI debut (cap 105): 15 August 2005 v Australia
- Last ODI: 7 December 2005 v India

Domestic team information
- Years: Team
- 2004–2013: Kent

Career statistics
Competition	WODI	WLA	WT20
Matches	7	86	21
Runs scored	1	56	5
Batting average	0.50	4.00	1.66
100s/50s	0/0	0/0	0/0
Top score	1	9	2*
Balls bowled	297	3,853	402
Wickets	6	98	21
Bowling average	35.00	22.45	16.23
5 wickets in innings	0	1	0
10 wickets in match	–	–	–
Best bowling	2/3	5/31	2/9
Catches/stumpings	1/–	23/–	4/–
- Source: CricketArchive, 5 March 2021

Joanna Karen "Jo" Watts (born 18 May 1987) is an English former cricketer who played as a right-arm off break bowler and right-handed batter. She appeared in seven One Day Internationals for England in 2005, taking six wickets at an average of 35.00 and an economy rate of 4.24. She played county cricket for Kent between 2004 and 2013.
