= Super Fours =

- Administrator: England and Wales Cricket Board
- Format: Women's limited overs
- First edition: 2002
- Latest edition: 2013
- Tournament format: League (50 over); Semi-final, Final (Twenty20)
- Number of teams: 4
- Current champion: Rubies (50 over); Sapphires (Twenty20)

The Super Fours was a women's limited overs cricket competition which was played annually in England between 2002 and 2013, with a break in 2009 and 2010. Designed to bring together the leading 48 players in English women's cricket, it originally composed solely of a 50-over tournament, but in 2004 a Twenty20 competition was added. The tournament, which was created to bridge the gap in quality between the Women's County Championship and international cricket, first featured overseas players in 2008, when Australians Alex Blackwell and Leah Poulton were invited to take part. The competition was not held in 2009 or 2010 due to a busy international schedule caused primarily by the ICC World Twenty20.

The two competitions consisted of four teams, originally named the Braves, the Knight Riders, the Super Strikers and the V Team, but renamed to the Rubies, Diamonds, Emeralds and Sapphires, respectively, in 2006. The Sapphires (previously the V Team) were the most successful team, winning three 50-over competitions and four Twenty20 competitions. Charlotte Edwards dominated the first four years of the competition, finishing as the leading run-scorer each time.

== Tournaments ==
=== 2002 ===
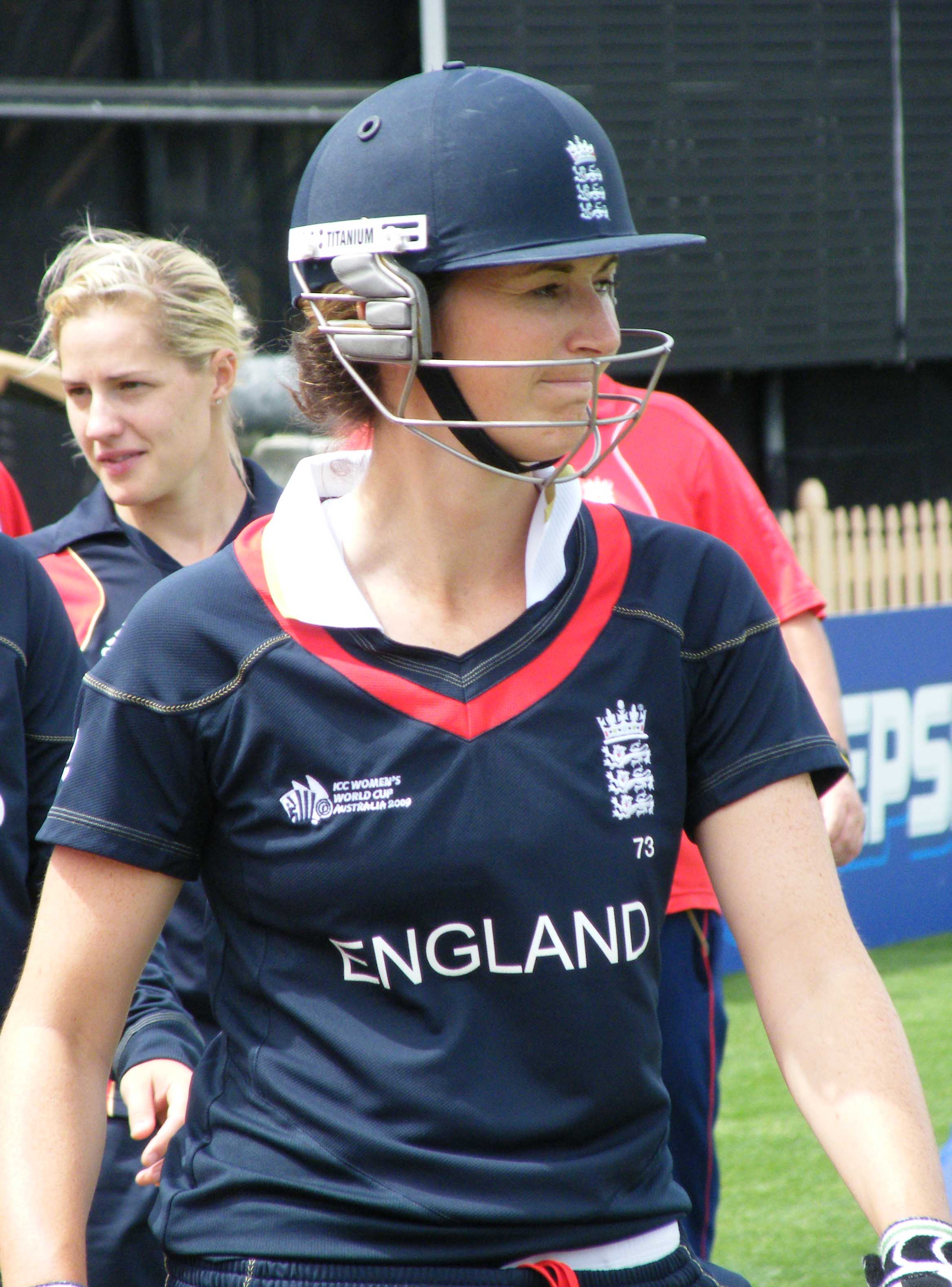
Charlotte Edwards was the leading run-scorer in three of the first four years of the competition.

In the inaugural tournament, a team-building exercise was initially held at Trent Bridge, at which four teams were selected from the 48 players invited. These teams; the Braves, the Knight Riders, the Super Strikers and the V Team, then faced each other in six contests held across five weekends. The Braves won four of their matches to win the competition, captained by Clare Connor, who also captained the England women's cricket team. The batting was led by England team-mates Charlotte Edwards and Claire Taylor, of the Knight Riders and the Super Strikers respectively, who both scored in excess of three hundred runs. Connor had the best bowling average in the competition, taking her seven wickets at 9.28, but Gill Richards of the V Team claimed the most wickets, taking eleven in total.

=== 2003 ===
For the 2003 competition, the teams kept the same core of players as they had held the previous season. The first round of matches were rained off, allowing each team to only contest five games. The Knight Riders, captained by Edwards, won four of these five matches to win the tournament. Edwards herself was the again the competition's leading run-scorer, aggregating 199 runs, though Lydia Greenway's average of 54.00 was the highest of the tournament. Marsha Davies, also of the Knight Riders, boasted the best bowling average, with eight wickets at 10.62, but Lucy Pearson took the most, claiming ten wickets.

=== 2004 ===
In 2004, the competition was refreshed: whites were replaced with coloured clothing, and a Twenty20 competition was introduced over one weekend in May. The V Team, captained by Laura Newton, won both tournaments. They won three matches, lost two and tied one in the main competition to narrowly finish top of the table, and enjoyed victories over the Knight Riders in the semi-finals and the Braves in the final to win the Twenty20. For the third consecutive season, Edwards scored the most runs in the competition, scoring 386 runs. Clare Taylor was the most prolific wicket-taker, claiming 14 wickets at 13.50.

=== 2005 ===
While the main tournament retained the same format for 2005, the Twenty20 competition altered slightly, adopting a short round-robin style league. The V Team retained their Twenty20 crown, winning all three of their matches. In the fifty over competition, the games were held over three weekends, and the Knight Riders emerged victorious; their captain, Edwards, once more finishing with the most runs in the tournament with 428. Newton took 13 wickets to lead the bowlers.

=== 2006 ===
The teams were rebranded and renamed for the 2005 competition; the original teams were replaced by the Sapphires, Diamonds, Rubies and Emeralds. Writing for Cricinfo, Jenny Thompson was scornful of the change, describing the names as "namby-pamby". In addition to the name changes, the team kits were "more stylish and flattering" according to chief executive Gill McConway. The teams were also selected based loosely on geography, giving each team more of an identity. The Sapphires (previously the V Team) won the competition, emerging victorious in four of their six matches. Claire Taylor finished as the competition's leading run-scorer with 426 runs, the first time Edwards had not taken the accolade, though she did finish second. Newton took the most wickets for the second consecutive year, claiming nine at an average of 23.55. The Twenty20 competition reverted to its original format of two semi-finals and a final, and was won by the Diamonds (formerly the Knight Riders) who beat the Rubies and the Sapphires on their way to victory.

=== 2007 ===
The Twenty20 competition was abandoned without a match played or a ball bowled in 2007 due to adverse weather conditions during the Whitsun weekend on which it was scheduled. In the main competition, the Rubies became the first team to win all their matches during the tournament to finish as winners. Both the leading batsman and bowler were drawn from the Rubies' side; Lydia Greenway's 233 runs led the competition, while the 19 wickets taken by Holly Colvin, at an average of 4.05, was 10 more than any other bowler managed.

=== 2008 ===
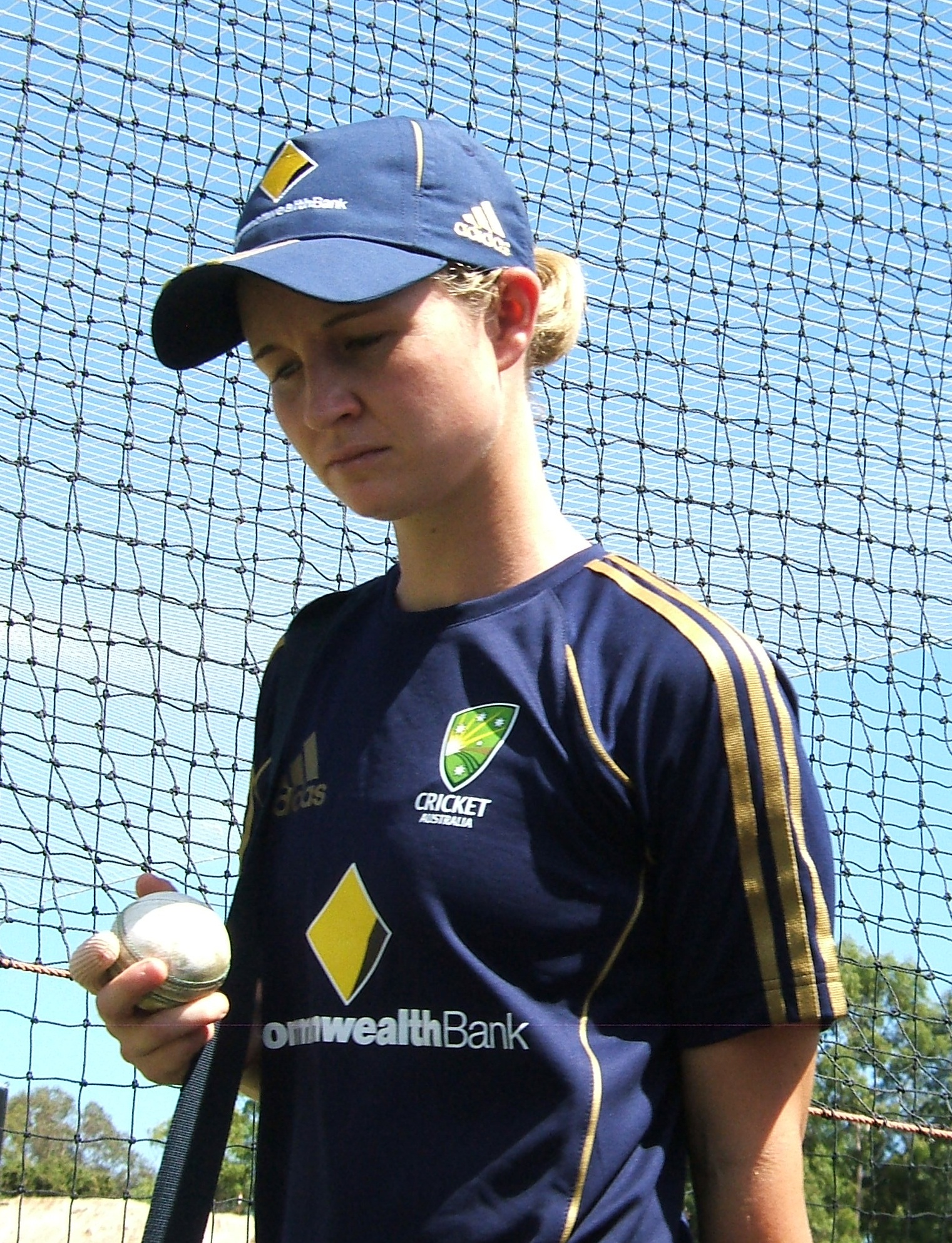
Leah Poulton (pictured) and Alex Blackwell were the first non-English players to compete in the Super Fours, in 2008.

In 2008, Australians Leah Poulton and Alex Blackwell were invited to compete in the competition, the first time any non-English players had taken part in the tournament. The move was made both to improve the quality of the competition, and to strengthen ties with Cricket Australia, in order that more English players might be able to compete there during the English winter. Poulton finished the competition as the leading run-scorer, appearing for the Sapphires, who won the 50-over competition, winning three of their four completed matches. The Twenty20 competition was won by the Rubies, for whom Blackwell played.

=== 2011 ===
Due to busy international schedules, the competition was shelved in both 2009 and 2010. It returned in 2011, but no overall winner was declared in the 50 over tournament: Diamonds and Rubies both won two games each. The Twenty20 competition, which once again followed the semi-final and final format was won by the Sapphires, who beat the Rubies in the final.

=== 2012 ===
No overall winner was again declared in the 50 over tournament, with Diamonds winning two games and Emeralds and Sapphires winning one apiece. Meanwhile, Rubies won the Twenty20 competition, beating Sapphires in the final by 6 wickets, with Lydia Greenway scoring a half-century.

=== 2013 ===
In 2013, the four teams were condensed into three, with Diamonds being disbanded. Leicestershire and Rutland Under-16 Boys competed in both formats to provide greater competition. The three women's teams won one 50 over game apiece, with one no result. In the Twenty20 competition, Sapphires claimed their fourth title, beating Emeralds in the final by 5 wickets.

== Winners ==
List of Super Fours winners
Year	Winner (50 overs)	Winners (Twenty20)
2002	Braves	Not competed
2003	Knight Riders	Not competed
2004	V Team	V Team
2005	Knight Riders	V Team
2006	Sapphires	Diamonds
2007	Rubies	Abandoned
2008	Sapphires	Rubies
2009	Not competed	
2010	Not competed	
2011	No overall winner	Sapphires
2012	No overall winner	Rubies
2013	No overall winner	Sapphires

== See also ==
- Women's County Championship
- Women's Twenty20 Cup
- Women's Cricket Super League
