= Kate Oakenfold =

English cricketer (born 1984)

Personal information
- Full name: Kate Georgina Elizabeth Oakenfold
- Born: 23 July 1984 (age 42); Brighton, East Sussex, England
- Batting: Right-handed
- Bowling: Right-arm fast-medium
- Role: All-rounder

International information
- National side: England (2001)
- ODI debut (cap 96): 10 August 2001 v Scotland
- Last ODI: 12 August 2001 v Ireland

Domestic team information
- Years: Team
- 2000–2008: Sussex
- 2005/06: Western Australia
- 2011/12–2012/13: South Australia

Career statistics
Competition	WODI	WLA	WT20
Matches	3	78	22
Runs scored	12	690	183
Batting average	4.00	12.32	11.43
100s/50s	0/0	0/1	0/0
Top score	6	61	35
Balls bowled	60	1,164	42
Wickets	0	24	1
Bowling average	–	12.32	52.00
5 wickets in innings	0	0	0
10 wickets in match	–	–	–
Best bowling	–	3/12	1/36
Catches/stumpings	2/–	16/–	2/–
- Source: CricketArchive, 6 March 2021

Kate Georgina Elizabeth Oakenfold (born 23 July 1984) is an English former cricketer who played as a right-handed batter and right-arm fast-medium bowler. She appeared in three One Day Internationals for England in August 2001, making her debut against Scotland. She played county cricket for Sussex and had spells with Australian state sides Western Australia and South Australia.
