= Diamonds (Super Fours) =

English women's cricket team

Personnel
- Captain: Charlotte Edwards (2002–2006; 2008–2012); Nicky Shaw (2007)

Team information
- Colours: Light blue
- Established: 2002

History
- SF50 wins: 2
- SFT20 wins: 1

Diamonds, previously known as Knight Riders, were an English women's cricket team that competed in the Super Fours. The squad varied from season to season, but was made up of some of the top players in English cricket. They were usually captained by Charlotte Edwards. They won three Super Fours titles in their history: two 50-over tournaments and one Twenty20 tournament.

== History ==
=== 2002–2005: Knight Riders ===
The Super Fours was established in 2002 as a way of bridging the gap between women's county cricket and international cricket, bringing together the top players in England. Knight Riders was one of the teams established, and was captained by Charlotte Edwards. They finished 2nd in the first 50 over tournament that took place, winning 3 out of 6 games.

The next season, 2003, Knight Riders won four of their matches on their way to claiming their first Super Fours title. Captain Charlotte Edwards was the leading run-scorer in the competition, with 199 runs, whilst Knight Riders bowler Lucy Pearson was the leading wicket-taker, with 10 wickets. In 2004, Knight Riders finished bottom of their group, and finished 3rd in the newly-established Twenty20 tournament. Charlotte Edwards was again the tournament leading run-scorer, with 386 runs, including 2 centuries. 2005 saw the Knight Riders claim their second 50 over title, winning four games. Edwards was once again the leading run-scorer, with 428 runs.

=== 2006–2012: Diamonds ===
In 2006 the side was renamed Diamonds and they won their first Twenty20 title, beating Sapphires by 21 runs in the final. This was to prove to be Diamonds' final title: they finished second in the 50 over in 2007 and 2008, as well as losing in the Twenty20 final in 2008. Diamonds did not compete in the final Super Fours season, 2013, with players being condensed into three teams.

== Seasons ==
=== Super Fours ===
Season	League standings							Notes
Season	P	W	L	T	A	Pts	Pos	Notes
2002	6	3	3	0	0	36	2nd	
2003	6	4	1	0	1	48	1st	Champions
2004	6	2	3	1	0	36	4th	
2005	6	4	1	1	0	66	1st	Champions
2006	6	2	3	1	0	44	3rd	
2007	6	3	3	0	0	57	2nd	
2008	6	2	2	0	2	62	2nd	
2011	2	2	0	0	0	–	–	No overall standings
2012	2	2	0	0	0	–	–	No overall standings

=== Super Fours Twenty20 ===
Year	Played	Wins	Losses	Tied	NR	Standing
2004	2	1	1	0	0	Won 3rd place play-off
2005	3	2	1	0	0	2nd in group
2006	2	2	0	0	0	Beat Sapphires in the final
2007	Tournament Abandoned					
2008	2	1	1	0	0	Lost to Rubies in the final
2011	2	1	1	0	0	Won 3rd place play-off
2012	2	1	1	0	0	Won 3rd place play-off
