= Laura Spragg =

English cricketer (born 1982)

Personal information
- Born: 16 June 1982 (age 44); Keighley, West Yorkshire, England
- Batting: Left-handed
- Bowling: Left-arm medium
- Role: Bowler

International information
- National side: England (1999–2004)
- Only Test (cap 140): 7 August 2003 v South Africa
- ODI debut (cap 89): 20 July 1999 v Denmark
- Last ODI: 10 August 2004 v New Zealand

Domestic team information
- Years: Team
- 1997–2016: Yorkshire
- 2016: Yorkshire Diamonds

Career statistics
Competition	WTest	WODI	WLA	WT20
Matches	1	13	141	8
Runs scored	2	114	1,265	64
Batting average	2.00	11.40	14.21	9.14
100s/50s	0/0	0/0	0/1	0/0
Top score	2	33	58	30
Balls bowled	114	354	5,289	168
Wickets	0	10	122	8
Bowling average	–	18.70	25.40	21.37
5 wickets in innings	–	0	1	0
10 wickets in match	–	0	0	0
Best bowling	–	3/8	5/11	2/11
Catches/stumpings	0/–	0/–	15/–	4/–
- Source: CricketArchive, 27 February 2021

Laura Spragg (born 16 June 1982) is an English former cricketer who played as a left-arm medium bowler and left-handed batter. She played for Yorkshire in domestic cricket and played for England in international cricket.

== Early life and education ==
Spragg was born in Keighley, West Yorkshire in June 1982. She attended Craven School before studying at Leeds Metropolitan University. Aside from playing cricket, Spragg also played football and rugby union.

== Domestic cricket ==
At the age of 14, Spragg made her debut for Yorkshire.

In 2016, Spragg made one appearance for Yorkshire Diamonds in the Women's Cricket Super League.

== International cricket ==
Spragg made her One Day International debut against Denmark in 1999.

She appeared in one Test match and 13 One Day Internationals for England. She also played for England under-23s. She played her sole Test match against South Africa in 2003.

Her best international bowling performance of 3 wickets for 8 runs came against the Netherlands. Her highest international score of 33 came against Scotland in the 2001 European Championship.
