= Laura Joyce =

English cricketer

Personal information
- Full name: Laura Michelle Joyce
- Born: 4 October 1983 (age 43); Islington, Greater London, England
- Batting: Right-handed
- Role: Wicket-keeper

International information
- National side: England (2001)
- ODI debut (cap 95): 10 August 2001 v Scotland
- Last ODI: 12 August 2001 v Ireland

Domestic team information
- Years: Team
- 1998–2000: Middlesex
- 2002–2008: Surrey
- 2006/07: Western Australia

Career statistics
Competition	WODI	WLA	WT20
Matches	3	97	11
Runs scored	27	1,832	88
Batting average	13.50	22.61	11.00
100s/50s	0/0	0/11	0/0
Top score	27	95	27
Balls bowled	–	30	–
Wickets	–	1	–
Bowling average	–	14.00	–
5 wickets in innings	–	0	–
10 wickets in match	–	–	–
Best bowling	–	1/14	–
Catches/stumpings	1/0	27/29	4/3
- Source: CricketArchive, 6 March 2021

Laura Michelle Joyce (born 4 October 1983) is an English former cricketer who played as a wicket-keeper and right-handed batter. She appeared in three One Day Internationals for England in August 2001, making her debut against Scotland. She batted twice, making 27 runs, and took one catch. She played county cricket for Middlesex from 1998 to 2000 and Surrey from 2002 to 2008. She had a brief stint with Western Australia in the 2006–07 Women's National Cricket League.
