= Lydia Greenway =

English cricketer

Lydia Greenway OBE
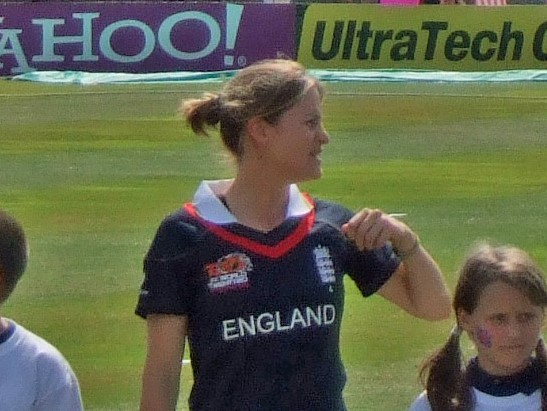
- Greenway during the 2009 World Twenty20

Personal information
- Full name: Lydia Sophie Greenway
- Born: 6 August 1985 (age 41); Farnborough, Greater London, England
- Batting: Left-handed
- Bowling: Right-arm off break
- Role: Batter

International information
- National side: England (2003–2016)
- Test debut (cap 138): 15 February 2003 v Australia
- Last Test: 11 August 2015 v Australia
- ODI debut (cap 102): 13 August 2003 v South Africa
- Last ODI: 12 February 2016 v South Africa
- ODI shirt no.: 20
- T20I debut (cap 4): 5 August 2004 v New Zealand
- Last T20I: 30 March 2016 v Australia

Domestic team information
- Years: Team
- 2000–2016: Kent
- 2016: Southern Vipers

Career statistics
Competition	WTest	WODI	WT20I	WLA
Matches	14	126	85	278
Runs scored	362	2,554	1,192	6,274
Batting average	15.73	30.04	24.32	32.17
100s/50s	0/2	1/12	0/2	3/37
Top score	70	125*	80*	125*
Balls bowled	–	–	–	682
Wickets	–	–	–	17
Bowling average	–	–	–	27.05
5 wickets in innings	–	–	–	0
10 wickets in match	–	–	–	0
Best bowling	–	–	–	3/7
Catches/stumpings	15/–	52/–	54/–	142/–
- Source: CricketArchive, 6 March 2021

Lydia Sophie Greenway OBE (born 6 August 1985) is an English cricket commentator and former cricketer who played as a left-handed batter and occasional right-arm off break bowler. She was also regarded as one of the best outfielders in the women's game. She appeared in 14 Test matches, 126 One Day Internationals and 85 Twenty20 Internationals for England between 2003 and 2016. She played county cricket for Kent and played in the 2016 Women's Cricket Super League for the Southern Vipers.

== Early life ==
Greenway was born on 6 August 1985 in Farnborough, Greater London.

In 1995, at the age of 10, Greenway helped to start a ladies team at Hayes Cricket Club. She attended Hayes School.

== International career ==
In the first Test against South Africa in August 2003 Greenway and Claire Taylor scored an England record 203 for the fourth wicket. She was a member of the team which retained the Ashes in Australia in 2008 and won the World Cup and World Twenty20 in 2009. She was named Player of the Match for her fluent half century in England's win over Australia in a One Day International at Perth on 9 January 2010 and Player of the Series in England's 4–1 win in the subsequent Twenty20 series.

On 1 June 2011, Greenway was named England's woman cricketer of the year for 2010. She scored her maiden One Day International century – an unbeaten 125 – against South Africa at Senwes Park, Potchefstroom in October 2011.

She was a holder of one of the first tranche of 18 ECB central contracts for women players, which were announced in April 2014.

She held the record for taking the most catches in a single Women's Cricket World Cup (8) until it was levelled by Amy Satterthwaite in the 2017 ICC Women's Cricket World Cup

Greenway announced her retirement from international cricket in June 2016.

Greenway was appointed Officer of the Order of the British Empire (OBE) in the 2023 Birthday Honours for services to cricket.

== Coaching career ==
In January 2017 Greenway announced the launch of her all-female cricket academy: Lydia Greenway's Cricket for Girls, which is aimed at coaching females of all abilities and ages.
