= 2013–14 Women's Ashes series =

Australia vs England cricket competition

English women's cricket team in Australia in 2014
	Australia	England
- Dates: 10 January – 2 February 2014
Captains	Jodie Fields	Charlotte Edwards
- Player of the series: Ellyse Perry (Aus)
Most runs	Ellyse Perry (286)	Charlotte Edwards (280)
Most wickets	Rene Farrell (12)	Anya Shrubsole (10)

Test series
- Result: England won the 1-match series 1–0
Most runs	Ellyse Perry (102)	Arran Brindle (103)
Most wickets	Ellyse Perry (8)	Anya Shrubsole (7)

One Day International series
- Results: Australia won the 3-match series 2–1
Most runs	Alex Blackwell (189)	Sarah Taylor (136)
Most wickets	Erin Osborne (5)	Jenny Gunn (4)

Twenty20 International series
- Results: Australia won the 3-match series 2–1
Most runs	Meg Lanning (143)	Charlotte Edwards (132)
Most wickets	Rene Farrell (5)	Arran Brindle (2); Georgia Elwiss (2); Danielle Hazell (2)

Total Ashes points
- Australia 8, England 10

The England women's cricket team toured Australia during the 2013–14 season, where they successfully defended The Women's Ashes.

The series was played five months after the Australian women's 2013 tour of England, and followed the men's 2013–14 Ashes series. It retained the same point format adopted for the 2013 Women's Ashes: the Ashes were decided based on a points system, taking into account not only of the one Test match, but also the results of limited-overs games. Six points are awarded for a Test victory (two points to each side in the event of a draw), and two points for a victory in any of the WODIs and WT20I games.

The only Test match of the tour took place on 10–13 January at Perth. England won the match by 61 runs. Three One Day Internationals were played: the first and second at Melbourne on 19 and 23 January were won by England and Australia respectively, and the third at Hobart on 26 January, was won by Australia. Three Twenty20 matches were also played, scheduled as "double-headed" events alongside the men's T20 matches between Australia and England. England won the first T20 at Hobart on 29 January, giving them an unassailable 10–4 points lead in the series, and thus retaining the Women's Ashes. The final two T20 matches played on 31 January and 2 February, at Melbourne and Sydney respectively were both won by Australia. The three T20s were double-headers along with men's T20 Matches.

In-between tourists also played a match against the Australia A Women on 6–7 January at Floreat Park Oval, Perth, which was drawn. They also played a 50-overs limited over warm-up against Cricket Australia Chairman's Women's XI on 19 January at Junction Oval, Melbourne, won by CA Women's XI by 2 wickets.

The final points total was Australia 8, England 10.

== Test Match ==
10 – 13 January 2014
Scorecard

England	v	Australia
201 (91.1 overs); Arran Brindle 68 (126); Rene Farrell 4/43 (18.1 overs)		207 (88.2 overs); Ellyse Perry 71 (172); Anya Shrubsole 4/51 (19 overs)
190 (79 overs); Charlotte Edwards 56 (76); Ellyse Perry 5/38 (20 overs)		123 (48.1 overs); Ellyse Perry 31 (54); Kate Cross 3/35 (14 overs)

England won by 61 runs
WACA Ground, Perth
Umpires: Ian Lock and Greg Davidson
Player of the match: Ellyse Perry (Aus)

- England won the toss and elected to bat.

== WODI series ==
=== 1st WODI ===
19 January 2014
10:00
Scorecard

Australia; 3/209 (50 overs)	v	England; 3/210 (46.5 overs)
Alex Blackwell 82 (121); Jenny Gunn 1/30 (10 overs)		Lydia Greenway 69* (94); Holly Ferling 1/29 (7 overs)

England won by 7 wickets
Melbourne Cricket Ground, Melbourne
Umpires: Shawn Craig and Geoff Joshua
Player of the match: Lydia Greenway (Eng)

- Australia won the toss and elected to bat.

=== 2nd WODI ===
23 January 2014
14:20
Scorecard

Australia; 7/266 (50 overs)	v	England; 240 (46.2 overs)
Nicole Bolton 124 (152); Natalie Sciver 2/23 (6 overs)		Sarah Taylor 63 (75); Erin Osborne 3/49 (8.2 overs)

Australia won by 26 runs
Melbourne Cricket Ground, Melbourne
Umpires: Ashley Barrow and Greg Davidson
Player of the match: Nicole Bolton (Aus)

- Australia won the toss and elected to bat

=== 3rd WODI ===
26 January 2014
13:00
Scorecard

England; 4/268 (50 overs)	v	Australia; 6/269 (49.3 overs)
Sarah Taylor 64 (57); Jess Jonassen 1/50 (10 overs)		Ellyse Perry 90* (95); Jenny Gunn 3/56 (10 overs)

Australia won by 4 wickets
Bellerive Oval, Hobart
Umpires: Tony Ward and Tony Wilds
Player of the match: Ellyse Perry (Aus)

- England won the toss and elected to bat

== WT20I series ==
=== 1st WT20I ===
29 January 2014
14:00
Scorecard

Australia; 3/150 (20 overs)	v	England; 1/151 (17.5 overs)
Meg Lanning 78* (54); Danielle Hazell 1/25 (4 overs)		Charlotte Edwards 92* (59); Jess Jonassen 1/29 (3 overs)

England won by 9 wickets
Bellerive Oval, Hobart
Umpires: Greg Davidson and Sam Nogajski
Player of the match: Charlotte Edwards (Eng)

- Australia won the toss and elected to bat

=== 2nd WT20I ===
31 January 2014
14:45
Scorecard

England; 6/98 (20 overs)	v	Australia; 3/99 (15.1 overs)
Charlotte Edwards 28 (34); Holly Ferling 2/14 (3 overs)		Meg Lanning 42 (28); Arran Brindle 1/9 (2 overs)

Australia won by 7 wickets
Melbourne Cricket Ground, Melbourne
Umpires: Shawn Craig and Tony Ward
Player of the match: Holly Ferling (Aus)

- Australia won the toss and elected to field

=== 3rd WT20I ===
2 February 2014
14:45
Scorecard

England; 8/101 (20 overs)	v	Australia; 3/102 (18.3 overs)
Natalie Sciver 28 (33); Rene Farrell 4/15 (3 overs)		Elyse Villani 36* (47); Georgia Elwiss 1/12 (3 overs)

Australia won by 7 wickets
Stadium Australia, Sydney
Umpires: Damien Mealey (Aus) and Tony Wilds (Aus)
Player of the match: Rene Farrell (Aus)

- Australia won the toss and elected to field.

== Results ==
Match	Date	Result	Points won		Running total	
Match	Date	Result	Australia	England	Australia	England
Only Test
WTest 135	10–13 January	England by 61 runs	0	6	0	6
ODI series
WODI 902	19 January	England by 7 wickets	0	2	0	8
WODI 905	23 January	Australia by 26 runs	2	0	2	8
WODI 907	26 January	Australia by 4 wickets	2	0	4	8
T20I series
WT20I 234	29 January	England by 9 wickets	0	2	4	10
WT20I 235	31 January	Australia by 7 wickets	2	0	6	10
WT20I 236	2 February	Australia by 7 wickets	2	0	8	10

== Statistics ==
=== Batting ===
Most runs

Player	Matches	Runs	Average	Highest
Ellyse Perry	7	286	95.33	90*
Charlotte Edwards	7	280	40.00	92*
Arran Brindle	7	244	61.00	68
Alex Blackwell	7	221	44.20	82*
Meg Lanning	7	221	31.57	78*

=== Bowling ===
Most wickets

Player	Matches	Wickets	Runs	Average	BBI
Rene Farrell	7	12	252	21.00	7/77
Ellyse Perry	7	12	306	25.50	8/79
Anya Shrubsole	4	10	268	26.80	7/99
Erin Osborne	7	8	247	30.87	3/49
Jenny Gunn	6	7	221	31.57	3/27

Preceded by 2010–11	English women's cricket team in Australia	Succeeded by 2017–18
