= 2013 Women's Ashes series =

Australian cricket tour of England

Australian women's cricket team in England in 2013
	England	Australia
- Dates: 5 August – 31 August 2013
Captains	Charlotte Edwards	Jodie Fields
- Player of the series: Heather Knight (Eng)
Most runs	Heather Knight (301)	Meg Lanning (298)
Most wickets	Katherine Brunt (9)	Erin Osborne (11)

Test series
- Result: 1-match series drawn 0–0
Most runs	Heather Knight (161)	Sarah Elliott (114)
Most wickets	Anya Shrubsole (3); Laura Marsh (3)	Erin Osborne (4)

One Day International series
- Results: England won the 3-match series 2–1
Most runs	Heather Knight (125)	Meg Lanning (120)
Most wickets	Katherine Brunt (5)	Jess Jonassen (6); Erin Osborne (6)

Twenty20 International series
- Results: England won the 3-match series 3–0
Most runs	Lydia Greenway (115)	Meg Lanning (94)
Most wickets	Danielle Hazell (4); Jenny Gunn (4)	Sarah Coyte (5)

Total Ashes points
- England 12, Australia 4

The Australian women's cricket team toured England in 2013. The visitors were defending the Women's Ashes.

The only Test match of the tour took place on 11–14 August at Wormsley Park, and was drawn. Three One-Day Internationals (ODIs) were played: the first at Lord's on 20 August, and the other two at Hove on 23 and 25 August. Also three Twenty20 International (T20I) matches were played, on 27, 29 and 31 August, at Chelmsford, Southampton and Chester-le-Street respectively (the second and third of these being followed, on the same dates and at the same venues, by T20I matches in the concurrent Australian men's tour).

The tourists also played a match against the England Academy women on 5–6 August at Brunton Memorial Ground, Radlett. Australia won the match by 116 runs.

In 2013, for the first time, the Ashes were decided based on a points system, taking account not only of the one Test match, but also the results of limited-overs games. Six points were awarded for a Test victory (two points to each side in the event of a draw), and two points for a victory in any of the ODIs and T20I games.

In that series England regained the Ashes as a result of its victory in the second T20I match. The final points total was England 12, Australia 4.

== Squads ==
Test		ODIs		T20Is	
England	Australia	England	Australia	England	Australia
Charlotte Edwards (c); Tammy Beaumont; Arran Brindle; Katherine Brunt; Lydia Greenway; Jenny Gunn; Danielle Hazell; Heather Knight; Laura Marsh; Natalie Sciver; Anya Shrubsole; Sarah Taylor (wk); Lauren Winfield; Danielle Wyatt	Jodie Fields (c) (wk); Alex Blackwell (vc); Jess Cameron; Sarah Coyte; Sarah Elliott; Holly Ferling; Rachael Haynes; Alyssa Healy (wk); Julie Hunter; Jess Jonassen; Meg Lanning; Erin Osborne; Ellyse Perry; Megan Schutt; Elyse Villani	Charlotte Edwards (c); Tammy Beaumont; Arran Brindle; Katherine Brunt; Holly Colvin; Georgia Elwiss*; Lydia Greenway; Jenny Gunn; Danielle Hazell; Heather Knight; Laura Marsh; Natalie Sciver*; Anya Shrubsole; Sarah Taylor(wk); Lauren Winfield	Jodie Fields (c) (wk); Alex Blackwell (vc); Jess Cameron; Sarah Coyte; Holly Ferling; Rachael Haynes; Alyssa Healy (wk); Julie Hunter; Jess Jonassen; Meg Lanning; Erin Osborne; Ellyse Perry; Megan Schutt; Elyse Villani	Charlotte Edwards (c); Tammy Beaumont; Arran Brindle; Katherine Brunt; Holly Colvin; Lydia Greenway; Jenny Gunn; Danielle Hazell; Heather Knight; Laura Marsh; Natalie Sciver; Anya Shrubsole; Sarah Taylor (wk); Danielle Wyatt	Jodie Fields (c) (wk); Alex Blackwell (vc); Jess Cameron; Sarah Coyte; Holly Ferling; Rachael Haynes; Alyssa Healy (wk); Julie Hunter; Jess Jonassen; Meg Lanning; Erin Osborne; Ellyse Perry; Megan Schutt; Elyse Villani

*Natalie Sciver replaced Georgia Elwiss (withdrew due to a back problem).

== Warm-up matches ==
Australia played two warm-up matches against the England Women's Academy, the first was a two-day match on 5–6 August (prior to the Test match) and the second was an ODI on 17 August (prior to the ODI and T20I series).

Warm-up matches

5 – 6 August 2013
Scorecard

Australia	v	England
340 (94.1 overs); Meg Lanning 104 (126); Kate Cross 4/48 (18 overs)		224 (82.2 overs); Lauren Winfield 74 (149); Jess Jonassen 4/16 (10.2 overs)

Australia won by 116 runs
Brunton Memorial Ground, Radlett
Umpires: M.T. Ennis and Nick Hall

- Australia won the toss and elected to bat.

17 August 2013
11:00
Scorecard

Australia; 306/9 (50 overs)	v	England; 124/9 (30 overs)
Meg Lanning 61 (52); Rebecca Grundy 2/47 (10 overs)		Danielle Wyatt 39 (42); Jess Jonassen 2/11 (3 overs)

Australia won by 101 runs (D/L method)
Wellington College, Crowthorne
Umpires: Terry Burstow (Eng) and Trevor Cox (Eng)

- Australia won the toss and elected to bat.

== Test ==
=== Test Match ===
11 – 14 August 2013
Scorecard

Australia	v	England
331/6d (124 overs); Sarah Elliott 104 (276); Anya Shrubsole 2/57 (27 overs)		314 (139.5 overs); Heather Knight 157 (338); Erin Osborne 4/67 (36.5 overs)
231/5d (86 overs); Jodie Fields 78* (122); Jenny Gunn 2/11 (9 overs)		93/2 (34 overs); Sarah Taylor 38* (79); Sarah Elliott 1/28 (7 overs)

Match drawn
Sir Paul Getty's Ground, Wormsley
Umpires: Mark Benson (Eng) and Mike Burns (Eng)
Player of the match: Heather Knight (Eng)

- Australia won the toss and elected to bat.
- Holly Ferling, Meg Lanning, Erin Osborne, Megan Schutt (all for Aus) and Tammy Beaumont, Anya Shrubsole (for Eng) made their Test debuts.

== ODI series ==
=== 1st ODI ===
20 August 2013
10:45
Scorecard

Australia; 203/8 (50 overs)	v	England; 176 (47.3 overs)
Meg Lanning 56 (64); Katherine Brunt 3/29 (10 overs)		Charlotte Edwards 61 (90); Jess Jonassen 4/38 (8.3 overs)

Australia won by 27 runs
Lord's, London
Umpires: Jeremy Lloyds (Eng) and Steve O'Shaughnessy (Eng)
Player of the match: Erin Osborne (Aus)

- Australia won the toss and elected to bat.

=== 2nd ODI ===
23 August 2013
14:20
Scorecard

England; 256/6 (50 overs)	v	Australia; 205 (48.2 overs)
Charlotte Edwards 53 (84); Jess Jonassen 2/29 (7 overs)		Jess Cameron 81 (108); Katherine Brunt 2/36 (9 overs)

England won by 51 runs
County Cricket Ground, Hove
Umpires: Martin Bodenham (Eng) and Peter Hartley (Eng)
Player of the match: Anya Shrubsole (Eng)

- England won the toss and elected to bat.

=== 3rd ODI ===
25 August 2013
10:45
Scorecard

Australia; 203/4 (36 overs)	v	England; 204/5 (33.2 overs)
Meg Lanning 64 (69); Danielle Hazell 2/36 (7 overs)		Heather Knight 69 (65); Erin Osborne 3/49 (7 overs)

England won by 5 wickets
County Cricket Ground, Hove
Umpires: Ismail Dawood (Eng) and Ian Gould (Eng)
Player of the match: Sarah Taylor (Eng)

- Australia won the toss and elected to bat.
- Due to a wet outfield the match was reduced to 36 overs per side.

== T20I series ==
=== 1st T20I ===
27 August 2013
19:00 (D/N)
Scorecard

England; 146/4 (20 overs)	v	Australia; 131/5 (20 overs)
Sarah Taylor 77 (58); Erin Osborne 1/22 (4 overs)		Jess Cameron 35 (36); Jenny Gunn 2/33 (4 overs)

England won by 15 runs
County Cricket Ground, Chelmsford
Umpires: Nick Cook (Eng) and Nigel Llong (Eng)
Player of the match: Sarah Taylor (Eng)

- England won the toss and elected to bat.

=== 2nd T20I ===
29 August 2013
14:15
Scorecard

Australia; 127/7 (20 overs)	v	England; 128/5 (19 overs)
Meg Lanning 60 (53); Danielle Hazell 2/11 (4 overs)		Lydia Greenway 80* (64); Sarah Coyte 2/29 (4 overs)

England won by 5 wickets
Rose Bowl, Southampton
Umpires: Michael Gough (Eng) and David Millns (Eng)
Player of the match: Lydia Greenway (Eng)

- Australia won the toss and elected to bat.
- Holly Ferling (Aus) made her T20I debut.

=== 3rd T20I ===
31 August 2013
10:00
Scorecard

Australia; 91/7 (20 overs)	v	England; 92/3 (16.2 overs)
Meg Lanning 32 (29); Danielle Hazell 2/20 (4 overs)		Natalie Sciver 37* (44); Sarah Coyte 2/9 (3 overs)

England won by 7 wickets
Riverside Ground, Chester-le-Street
Umpires: Tim Robinson (Eng) and Martin Saggers (Eng)
Player of the match: Katherine Brunt (Eng)

- England won the toss and elected to field.

== Results ==
Match	Date	Result	Points won		Running total	
Match	Date	Result	England	Australia	England	Australia
Test
WTest 1344	11–14 August	Draw	2	2	2	2
One-Day Internationals
WODI 881	20 August	Australia by 27 runs	0	2	2	4
WODI 882	23 August	England by 51 runs	2	0	4	4
WODI 883	25 August	England by 5 wickets	2	0	6	4
Twenty20s
WT20I 208	27 August	England by 15 runs	2	0	8	4
WT20I 209	29 August	England by 5 wickets	2	0	10	4
WT20I 210	31 August	England by 7 wickets	2	0	12	4

== Statistics ==
=== Batting ===
Most runs

Player	Team	Matches	Runs	Average	Highest	100	50
Heather Knight	England	7	301	37.62	157	1	1
Meg Lanning	Australia	7	298	37.25	64	0	3
Sarah Taylor	England	7	269	38.42	77	0	2
Jess Cameron	Australia	7	241	30.12	81	0	2
Alex Blackwell	Australia	7	206	29.42	54	0	1

=== Bowling ===
Most wickets

Player	Team	Matches	Wickets	Runs	Average	BBI	5
Erin Osborne	Australia	7	11	290	26.36	4/67	0
Sarah Coyte	Australia	7	10	220	22.00	2/9	0
Katherine Brunt	England	7	9	233	25.88	3/29	0
Jenny Gunn	England	7	8	274	34.25	2/11	0
Jess Jonassen	Australia	4	6	131	21.83	4/38	0
