= Meg Lanning =

Australian cricketer (born 1992)

Meg Lanning AM
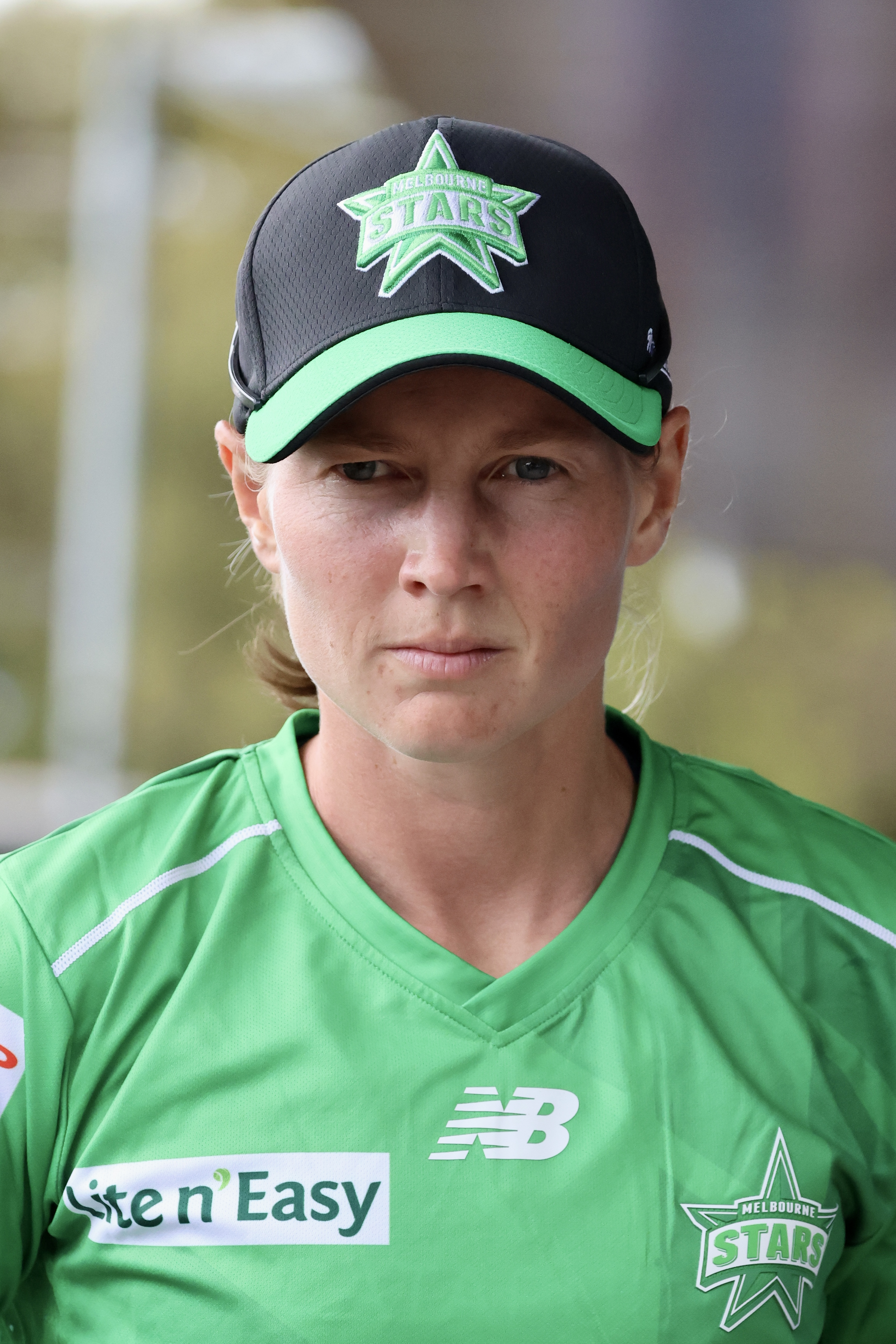
- Lanning in 2025

Personal information
- Full name: Meghann Moira Lanning
- Born: 25 March 1992 (age 34); Singapore
- Nickname: Megastar, Serious Sally
- Batting: Right-handed
- Bowling: Right-arm medium
- Role: Top-order batter
- Relatives: Anna Lanning (sister)

International information
- National side: Australia (2010–2023)
- Test debut (cap 164): 11 August 2013 v England
- Last Test: 27 January 2022 v England
- ODI debut (cap 119): 5 January 2011 v England
- Last ODI: 21 January 2023 v Pakistan
- ODI shirt no.: 17
- T20I debut (cap 32): 30 December 2010 v New Zealand
- Last T20I: 26 February 2023 v South Africa
- T20I shirt no.: 17

Domestic team information
- Years: Team
- 2007/08–present: Victoria
- 2015/16–2016/17, 2020/21–present: Melbourne Stars
- 2018: Supernovas
- 2018/19–2019/20: Perth Scorchers
- 2023–2025: Delhi Capitals
- 2024: London Spirit
- 2025: Oval Invincibles
- 2026: UP Warriorz
- 2026: Jamaica Empress

Career statistics
Competition	Test	ODI	T20I	LA
Matches	6	103	132	186
Runs scored	345	4,602	3,405	8,555
Batting average	31.36	53.51	36.61	55.19
100s/50s	0/2	15/21	2/15	24/47
Top score	93	152*	133*	190
Balls bowled	48	132	36	232
Wickets	0	1	4	1
Bowling average	–	114.00	9.75	228.00
5 wickets in innings	–	0	0	0
10 wickets in match	–	0	0	0
Best bowling	–	1/30	2/17	1/30
Catches/stumpings	3/–	53/–	45/–	86/–
Medal record
Women's Cricket
Representing Australia
Women's Cricket World Cup
Winner	2013 India
Winner	2022 New Zealand
T20 World Cup
Winner	2012 Sri Lanka
Winner	2014 Bangladesh
Winner	2018 West Indies
Winner	2020 Australia
Winner	2023 South Africa
Runner-up	2016 India
Commonwealth Games
Gold medal – first place	2022 Birmingham
- Source: ESPNcricinfo, 6 August 2025

Meghann Moira Lanning AM (born 25 March 1992) is an Australian cricketer who formerly captained the Australia women's national team. Lanning has been a member of seven successful world championship campaigns, winning two Women's Cricket World Cup and five ICC Women's World Twenty20 titles. She holds the record for the most Women's One Day International centuries and is the first Australian to score 2,000 Twenty20 International runs.

Domestically, Lanning plays for Victoria in the Women's National Cricket League and the Melbourne Stars in the Women's Big Bash League. She is also the captain of the Delhi Capitals in the Women's Premier League from the inaugural season in 2023 to 2025. For the 2026 WPL, she was bought by UP Warriorz. On 10 November 2023 she announced her retirement from international cricket.

== Early life and education ==
Lanning was born in Singapore to father Wayne, a banker, and mother Sue. Her family shortly thereafter relocated to the Sydney suburb of Thornleigh, where she attended Warrawee Public School. Lanning began playing organised cricket at the age of ten, following a suggestion from her teacher to try out for a regional team. She went on to represent New South Wales at primary school level alongside several future Australian team mates, including Ellyse Perry. While growing up, her sporting idols were Ricky Ponting and Paul Kelly.

Ahead of her first year at high school, Lanning's family uprooted again, moving to the Melbourne suburb of Kew. She attended Carey Baptist Grammar School and, at 14 years of age, made headlines by becoming the first girl to play First XI cricket for an Associated Public Schools team. In 2021, Lanning was awarded the Carey Medal, which is presented annually to a past or present student, staff member or parent in "recognition of exceptional and outstanding service to the wider community".

Lanning has a Bachelor's degree in Exercise and Health Science from the Australian Catholic University. She graduated in 2019.

== International cricket ==
=== 2010–2012: Limited overs debut, first World Twenty20 title ===
Lanning made her international cricket debut on 30 December 2010 in a T20I against New Zealand at Saxton Oval, scoring ten runs in a four-wicket victory. She then played in her first ODI on 5 January 2011 against England at the WACA Ground, scoring 20 in a 33-run victory (via the Duckworth–Lewis method). On both occasions, she appeared alongside fellow debutant Sarah Coyte.

Two days later, Lanning scored her maiden ODI century, making 103 not out off 118 balls to help Australia defeat England by nine wickets. At 18 years and 288 days, she became the country's youngest-ever centurion—a record previously held by Ricky Ponting at 21 years and 21 days.

At the 2012 ICC Women's World Twenty20, Lanning was the third-highest run-scorer with 138 across five innings. She made 25 off 24 balls against England in the final which Australia went on to win by four runs.

In an ODI against New Zealand on 17 December at North Sydney Oval, Lanning "blitzed" a century off 45 balls to lead her team to an emphatic nine-wicket victory, surpassing Karen Rolton's record for the fastest hundred by an Australian woman.

=== 2013: Cricket World Cup success, Test debut ===
During a group stage match against New Zealand at the 2013 Women's Cricket World Cup, Lanning scored 112 off 104 deliveries and formed a 182-run partnership with Jess Duffin to help chase down a target of 228 with seven wickets in hand and 70 balls remaining. She contributed 31 from 41 in the final against the West Indies, which Australia won by 114 runs to be crowned 50-over world champions.

During the 2013 Women's Ashes, Lanning made her Test debut on 11 August at Sir Paul Getty's Ground. She was run out for 48 in the first innings and made 38 in the second. The match ended in a draw.

=== 2014–2016: Assumption of captaincy, second World Twenty20 title ===
On 19 January 2014, Lanning became Australia's youngest-ever captain, standing in for Jodie Fields mid-way through the 2013–14 Women's Ashes. She scored 78 not out from 54 balls in a T20I at Bellerive Oval, although England would go on to win the match by nine wickets and consequently clinch the series.

In February 2014, Lanning was appointed as the full-time captain of Australia's T20 team. In a retrospective interview, she described the decision as "a bit of a shock because I hadn't really thought too much about leadership or anything like that". At the 2014 World Twenty20, Lanning was the tournament's top run-scorer, compiling 257 across six innings. During a group stage match against Ireland, she made 126 runs from 65 balls to set a new record for highest individual total in women's T20Is. In the final against England, she scored 44 off 30 to help Australia chase down a target of 106 with seven wickets in hand and 29 balls remaining.

Lanning was confirmed as the national team's captain for all three forms of the game in June 2014. The Sydney Morning Herald reported the appointment as a "messy captaincy handover" from incumbent Fields, who subsequently retired from international cricket despite urges from Australian selectors to reconsider.

In the second ODI of the 2015 Women's Ashes, Lanning scored 104 from 98 deliveries and formed a partnership of 132 with Ellyse Perry in a 63-run win. She followed up with another strong performance in the following match, scoring 85 off 89 to help defeat England by 89 runs. Australia went on to secure a series victory in the T20I leg of the tour, marking Lanning's first Ashes triumph as captain.

On 21 March 2016, Lanning was dismissed without scoring for the first time in a Twenty20 International, setting a record for most T20I innings (61) before registering a duck. (Note: Men's player David Miller broke the record in 2022.)

=== 2017–2018: Struggle with injury, third World Twenty20 title ===
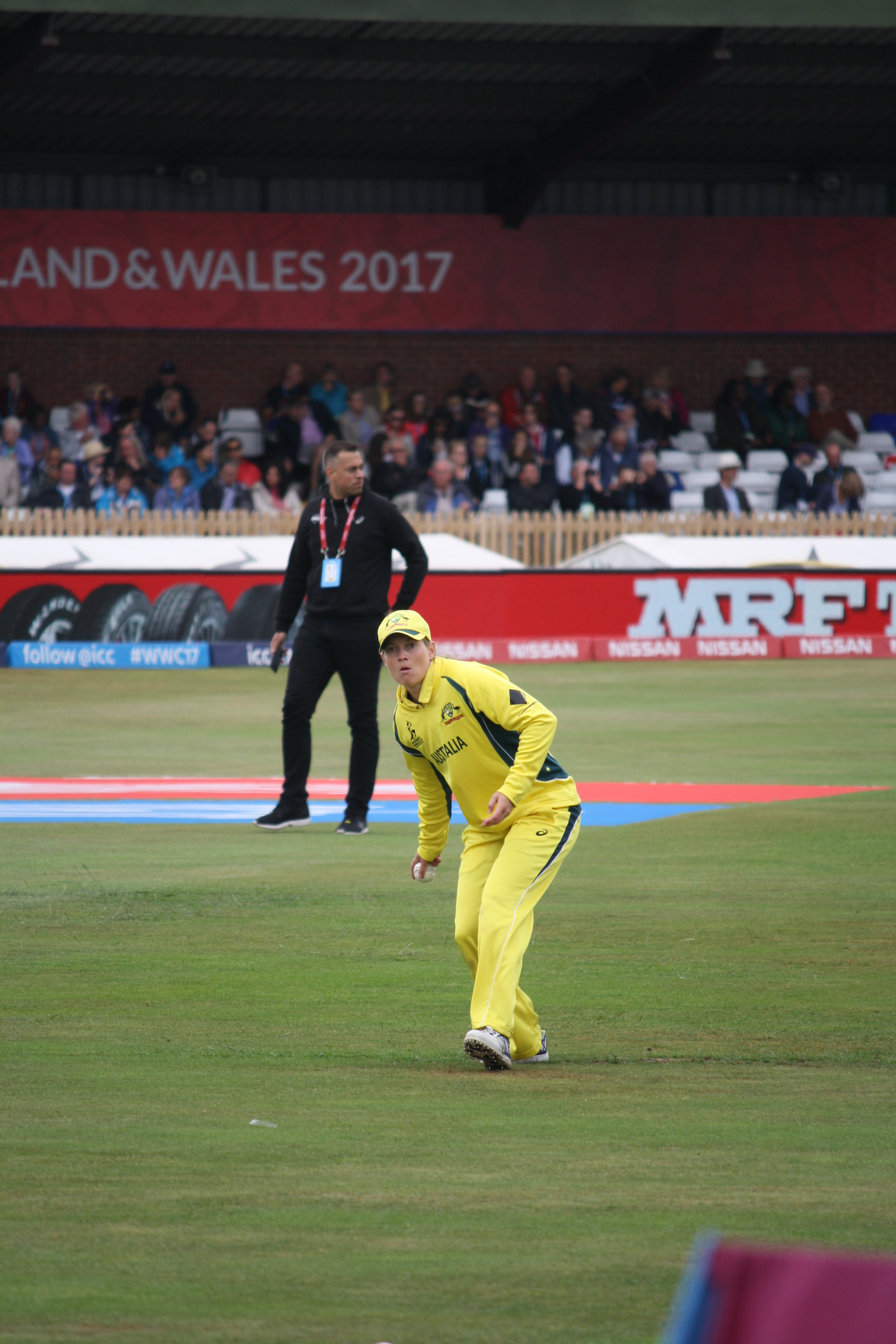
Lanning at the 2017 Women's Cricket World Cup

Having broken the record for most centuries (ten) in Women's One Day Internationals earlier in the year, Lanning entered the 2017 Women's Cricket World Cup under a fitness cloud, battling a persistent right shoulder ailment. Australia's first match of the tournament started in "chaotic fashion" at the coin toss when West Indies captain Stafanie Taylor called correctly and elected to bat before quickly changing her mind, only for Lanning to object. After much debate, match referee David Jukes adjudicated Taylor's first call had to stand. Following an eight-wicket defeat of the West Indies, Lanning shrugged off injury concerns with an innings of 152 not out from 135 balls against Sri Lanka. She would, however, go on to sit out of group stage matches against Pakistan and South Africa. At the conclusion of the tournament, from which Australia were eliminated via a 36-run semi-final loss to India, CA announced Lanning would undergo shoulder surgery that was expected to sideline her for six to eight months.

Lanning made her return to international cricket on a tour of India in March 2018, during which she became the second-fastest woman to reach 3,000 runs in ODIs and the first Australian to score 2,000 runs in T20Is. At the 2018 World Twenty20 tournament in the West Indies, Lanning scored 28 not out in the final against England and hit the winning run to secure another championship for Australia.

=== 2019–2020: Fourth T20 World Cup title ===
During the only Test of the 2019 Women's Ashes, Lanning recorded her first half-century in cricket's longest format. With the match petering out as a "dull" draw, her tactical decisions as captain—including the timing of declarations and employment of a second new ball—were questioned by several commentators amidst suggestions that "cricket was the loser" and that "a will to win and a desire to do the long format justice went astray". Regardless, the series was dominated by Australia, and outright victory was secured on 29 July at Chelmsford with a 93-run win in the first T20I of the tour. The match was notable for Lanning's innings of 133 not out off 63 balls, making it the second time she had set a new record for highest individual total in women's T20Is.

Lanning played two key innings for Australia at the 2020 Women's T20 World Cup. The first occurred in a group stage victory over Sri Lanka at the WACA Ground, during which she scored 41 not out and formed a 95-run partnership with Rachael Haynes. The match, which saw Australia recover from 3/10 to chase down a target of 123 with three balls remaining, was Lanning's 100th T20I appearance. Her second notable performance of the tournament took place in the semi-final at the Sydney Cricket Ground. She made 49 not out in a rain-affected encounter to help defeat South Africa by five runs (via the Duckworth–Lewis–Stern method). Lanning's team went on to defeat India in the final at the Melbourne Cricket Ground by 85 runs, consequently placing her alongside Lyn Larsen and Michael Clarke as the only Australian cricketers to captain a World Cup title win on home soil.

In November 2020, Lanning was nominated for the Rachael Heyhoe Flint Award for ICC Female Cricketer of the Decade, and the awards for women's ODI and T20I cricketer of the decade.

=== 2021–2022: Second Cricket World Cup title ===
On 4 April 2021, Lanning led Australia in a six-wicket victory against New Zealand, marking the team's world record-breaking 22nd ODI win in a row. She captained the team in four more consecutive victories before the streak was finally broken at 26 against India in September.

In the only Test of the 2021–22 Women's Ashes, played at Manuka Oval, Lanning became just the third cricketer after England's Charlotte Edwards and India's Mithali Raj to captain her side in 150 women's international matches. She also managed a new highest Test score, but fell short of a maiden red ball century as she was dismissed for 93 in the first innings. In contrast to the Test in 2019, Lanning was praised for her captaincy on the final day of the match—which ended in a draw—after making a "bold declaration" that helped set up a "thrilling" finish.

Lanning began the 2022 Women's Cricket World Cup with an innings of 86, and a second-wicket partnership of 196 alongside Rachael Haynes, in a twelve-run victory against England at Seddon Park. She went on to score 97 against India and 135 not out against South Africa, while Australia progressed through the group stage of the tournament undefeated. In the final, played at Hagley Oval, Australia defeated England by 71 runs to give Lanning her first 50-over world championship as captain.

She led the Australian team in 2022 Commonwealth Games. In the tournament final, against India, Lanning again scored 36 but was run out halfway through the first innings. Her team successfully defended a total of 161, winning the match by nine runs to claim the gold medal.

In August 2022, Lanning announced she would be taking an "indefinite" break from cricket for personal reasons.

=== 2023: Fifth T20 World Cup title ===
Lanning made her international cricket return against Pakistan in January 2023. The following month, she captained Australia to another major championship with her team going through the 2023 ICC Women's T20 World Cup undefeated. Having scored 41 from 33 balls in a 97-run victory against New Zealand at Boland Park to begin the tournament, she played another key innings of 49 not out from 34 balls in a memorable semi-final win against India at Newlands. The five-run victory, in which Australia pulled off an unlikely comeback, was described by Lanning as "one of the best wins I have been involved in".

== Domestic cricket ==
=== Women's National Cricket League ===
Lanning has captained Victoria since 2014 and is yet to play in a Women's National Cricket League (WNCL) championship-winning team despite consistently being a standout performer. She made her debut on 6 December 2008, scoring three runs in a win against the South Australian Scorpions. A breakout season in 2010–11 resulted in two half-centuries and an average of 67.33. Lanning recorded her first WNCL century on 29 October 2011, making 127 off 123 balls against the Queensland Fire. Her form across the 2011–12 season earned her the Sharon Tredrea Trophy as Victoria's Player of the Year. She has since won the same award on five more occasions.

On 10 November 2012, Lanning broke the record for the highest individual WNCL score, making 175 from 143 balls against the ACT Meteors, surpassing the previous record of 173 set by Karen Rolton. Eight days later, she made 241 not out off 136 balls for Box Hill in the Victorian Women's Cricket Association (the highest individual total in Women's Premier Cricket until she broke the record again six seasons later with a score of 244 off 145 balls). On 29 October 2016, Lanning surpassed her own WNCL record by scoring 190 runs off 153 balls against Tasmania. She was named Player of the Tournament for the 2016–17 season, although her team failed to qualify for the final.

=== Women's Big Bash League ===
==== Melbourne Stars ====
At the official Women's Big Bash League (WBBL) launch on 10 July 2015, Lanning was unveiled as the Melbourne Stars' first-ever player signing and captain. She was the leading run-scorer in the inaugural season, compiling 560 at an average of 56.00, and was named Player of the Tournament. Although she led the league for runs again in 2016–17, the Stars narrowly missed out on qualifying for the finals for the second consecutive season.

==== Perth Scorchers ====
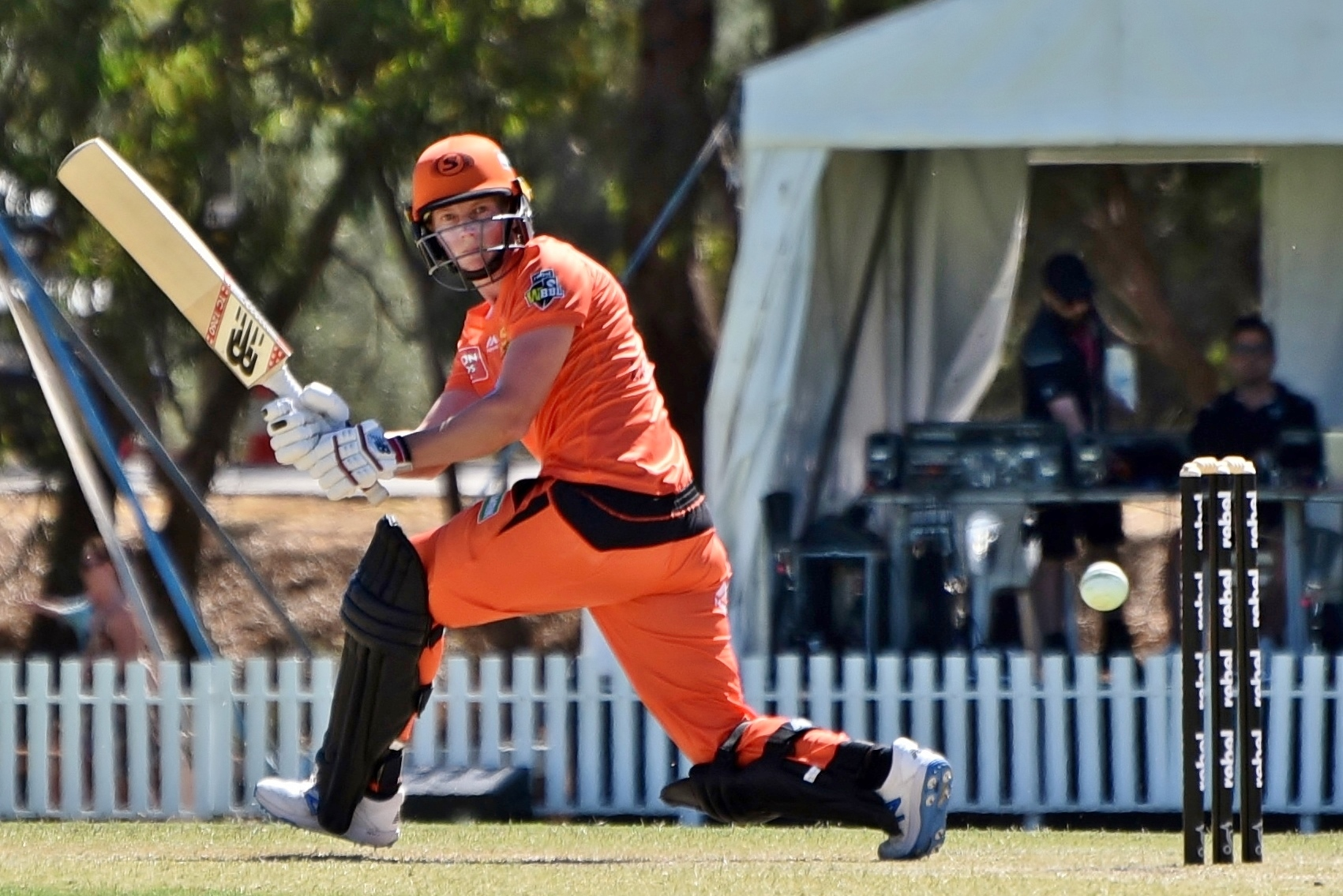
Lanning during her maiden WBBL century, playing for the Perth Scorchers in 2019

Ahead of WBBL|03, Lanning departed the Melbourne Stars and signed on to captain the Perth Scorchers. She did not play a game with the club in the 2017–18 season due to undergoing shoulder surgery. In 2018–19, Lanning continued to be troubled with injuries, consequently playing just nine of 14 games. She nevertheless "hit a rich run of form" late in the tournament, managing 389 runs at an average of 48.62, but once again her team fell less than a game short of qualifying for finals.

Lanning was the fourth-highest run-scorer in WBBL|05, finishing with 531 at an average of 40.84. She recorded her first WBBL century on 1 December 2019 in a 35-run win over the Hobart Hurricanes. The Scorchers finished the regular season in third place, resulting in Lanning's first WBBL finals appearance, although they were comfortably knocked out of the tournament via an eight-wicket semi-final loss to the Adelaide Strikers.

==== Return to the Stars ====
In June 2020, Lanning flagged the possibility of an imminent WBBL homecoming. With her contract at the Scorchers expired, she announced a return to her former team on 22 July, signing a new deal to play for the Melbourne Stars in WBBL|06. On 22 September, the Stars announced Lanning would resume her role as captain of the team. With an innings of 51 not out from 38 balls against the Perth Scorchers on 7 November at North Sydney Oval, she became the league's first player to score a half-century against all eight teams. The Stars finished the regular season in first place but suffered a comprehensive defeat in the final at the hands of the Sydney Thunder. Lanning's decision at the coin toss to bat first—a tactic she hadn't used since the 2016–17 season—was described by commentators as a "surprise", a "shock", and a "risky move" that backfired.

=== The Hundred ===
In April 2022, Lanning was bought by the Trent Rockets for the 2022 season of The Hundred in England, but she ultimately pulled out of the tournament.

=== Women's Premier League ===
Lanning was bought by the Delhi Capitals in the 2023 Women's Premier League (WPL) player auction for a price of ₹1.1 crore (US$140,000). She was subsequently named the team's captain for the inaugural WPL season. Lanning was the leading run-scorer of the tournament, amassing 345 runs in nine innings to win the Orange Cap. After finishing the regular season in first place, her team lost to the Mumbai Indians in the championship decider. In both the 2024 and 2025 editions, Lanning led DC to the final, but they lost both times to Royal Challengers Bengaluru (RCB) and Mumbai Indians (MI) respectively. Before the 2026 mega auction, DC released Lanning and she was bought in the auction by UP Warriorz for a price of ₹1.9 crore (US$2,11,238.96).

== Records and statistics ==
=== Overview ===
Lanning holds the record for the most Women's ODI centuries, having surpassed Charlotte Edwards' tally of nine on 5 March 2017 against New Zealand at Bay Oval. She retired having scored a total of 15 centuries, which combined with her two T20I hundreds, brings her career total to 17 international centuries.

=== One Day International centuries ===
Meg Lanning's One Day International centuries
No.	Score	Opponents	City/Country	Venue	Year
1	104*	England	Perth, Australia	WACA	2011
2	128	India	Mumbai, India	Wankhede Stadium	2012
3	103	New Zealand	Sydney, Australia	North Sydney Oval	2012
4	112	New Zealand	Cuttack, India	DRIEMS Ground	2013
5	135*	West Indies	Bowral, Australia	Bradman Oval	2014
6	104	England	Bristol, England	Bristol County Ground	2015
7	114*	New Zealand	Mount Maunganui, New Zealand	Bay Oval	2016
8	127	New Zealand	Mount Maunganui, New Zealand	Bay Oval	2016
9	134	South Africa	Canberra, Australia	Manuka Oval	2016
10	104*	New Zealand	Mount Maunganui, New Zealand	Bay Oval	2017
11	152*	Sri Lanka	Bristol, England	Bristol County Ground	2017
12	124	Pakistan	Bandar Kinrara, Malaysia	Kinrara Academy Oval	2018
13	121	West Indies	Antigua	Coolidge Cricket Ground	2019
14	101*	New Zealand	Brisbane, Australia	Allan Border Field	2020
15	135*	South Africa	Wellington, New Zealand	Basin Reserve	2022

=== Twenty20 International centuries ===
Meg Lanning's T20 International centuries
No.	Score	Opponents	City/Country	Venue	Year
1	126	Ireland	Sylhet, Bangladesh	Sylhet International Cricket Stadium	2014
2	133*	England	Chelmsford, England	County Ground	2019

== Personal life ==
Lanning's nicknames are "Megastar" and "Serious Sally", the latter being an allusion to her level-headedness. Early in her career, she had another nickname, "Fui": "There is a rugby league player called Fui Fui Moi Moi and as my middle name is Moira – I then got Fui."

Lanning has a strong interest in a variety of other sports, representing Victoria in hockey at junior level (and also having played at senior level for the Hawthorn Hockey Club) as well as supporting the Sydney Swans in Australian rules football. The fourth of five children, Lanning has been a member of top-level domestic cricket teams alongside her younger sister, Anna.

In August 2022, Lanning announced an indefinite hiatus from cricket, citing personal reasons. During her break, she worked in a café and also spent time travelling, and received praise among the cricket community for the "brave" decision to take time away from the sport. She returned to international cricket in January 2023, for a bilateral series against Pakistan. She retired permanently from international cricket in November 2023, later revealing the reason was an unhealthy imbalance between obsessive exercise and not eating.

== Honours ==
=== Team ===
- 2× Women's Cricket World Cup champion: 2013, 2022
- 5× ICC Women's World Twenty20 champion: 2012, 2014, 2018, 2020, 2023
- Commonwealth Games champion: 2022
- 3× Australian Women's Twenty20 Cup champion: 2009–10, 2010–11, 2011–12

=== Individual ===
- ICC Women's ODI Cricketer of the Year: 2015
- ICC Women's T20I Cricketer of the Year: 2014
- Wisden Leading Woman Cricketer in the World: 2015
- 3× Belinda Clark Award winner: 2014, 2015,
- Women's National Cricket League Player of the Tournament: 2016–17
- 6× Sharon Tredrea Trophy winner: 2011–12, 2012–13, 2014–15, 2015–16, 2016–17, 2018–19
- Women's Big Bash League Player of the Tournament: 2015–16
- 2× Melbourne Stars Player of the Season: 2015–16, 2016–17
- Australian Women's Health Sport Awards Leadership Legend: 2019
- Member of the Order of Australia
- A tunnel boring machine used in Victoria is named after her.
