= 2019 Women's Ashes series =

International cricket tour

| | England women | Australia women |
- Dates: 26 June – 31 July 2019
| Captains | Heather Knight | Meg Lanning |

Test series
- Result: 1-match series drawn 0–0
| Most runs | Nat Sciver (88) | Ellyse Perry (192) |
| Most wickets | Laura Marsh (4) | Sophie Molineux (4) |

One Day International series
- Results: Australia women won the 3-match series 3–0
| Most runs | Tammy Beaumont (134) | Alyssa Healy (143) |
| Most wickets | Anya Shrubsole (5) | Ellyse Perry (11) |

Twenty20 International series
- Results: Australia women won the 3-match series 2–1
| Most runs | Lauren Winfield (71) | Meg Lanning (178) |
| Most wickets | Sophie Ecclestone (6) | Megan Schutt (5) |
- Player of the series: Ellyse Perry (Aus)

Total Ashes points
- England women 4, Australia women 12

The Australia women's cricket team toured England in June and July 2019 to play the England women's cricket team to contest the Women's Ashes. The tour consisted of three Women's One Day Internationals (WODIs), one Women's Test match and three Women's Twenty20 Internationals (WT20Is). A points-based system was used across all three formats of the tour. The Women's Ashes were held by Australia prior to the start of the series.

Australia women won the WODI series 3–0, therefore taking a 6–0 lead in the points-based system. The one-off Test match was drawn, giving Australia an unassailable 8–2 lead in the series, and therefore the team retained the Women's Ashes. Following the conclusion of the one-off Test, the question was raised about whether Women's Test matches should be played across five days, instead of four.

During the second WT20I match, Australia's Ellyse Perry became the first player, male or female, to score 1,000 runs and take 100 wickets in Twenty20 International cricket. She scored her 1,000th run in the match, after taking her 100th wicket in the final of the 2018 ICC Women's World Twenty20 tournament in November 2018, also against England.

Australia won the WT20I series 2–1, therefore retained the Ashes 12–4 in the points-based system.

== Squads ==
| WTest | | WODIs | | WT20Is | |
| England | Australia | England | Australia | England | Australia |
|---|---|---|---|---|---|
| Heather Knight (c); Tammy Beaumont; Katherine Brunt; Kate Cross; Sophie Ecclestone; Georgia Elwiss; Kirstie Gordon; Amy Jones; Laura Marsh; Nat Sciver; Anya Shrubsole; Sarah Taylor (wk); Lauren Winfield | Meg Lanning (c); Rachael Haynes (vc); Nicole Bolton; Nicola Carey; Ashleigh Gardner; Alyssa Healy (wk); Jess Jonassen; Delissa Kimmince; Sophie Molineux; Beth Mooney; Ellyse Perry; Megan Schutt; Elyse Villani; Tayla Vlaeminck; Georgia Wareham | Heather Knight (c); Tammy Beaumont; Katherine Brunt; Kate Cross; Sophie Ecclestone; Jenny Gunn; Amy Jones; Laura Marsh; Nat Sciver; Anya Shrubsole; Sarah Taylor (wk); Fran Wilson; Lauren Winfield; Danni Wyatt | Meg Lanning (c); Rachael Haynes (vc); Nicole Bolton; Nicola Carey; Ashleigh Gardner; Alyssa Healy (wk); Jess Jonassen; Delissa Kimmince; Beth Mooney; Ellyse Perry; Megan Schutt; Elyse Villani; Tayla Vlaeminck; Georgia Wareham | Heather Knight (c); Tammy Beaumont; Katherine Brunt; Kate Cross; Sophie Ecclestone; Georgia Elwiss; ~~Jenny Gunn~~; Amy Jones (wk); Laura Marsh; Nat Sciver; Anya Shrubsole; ~~Sarah Taylor (wk)~~; Mady Villiers; Fran Wilson; Lauren Winfield; Danni Wyatt | Meg Lanning (c); Rachael Haynes (vc); Nicole Bolton; Nicola Carey; Ashleigh Gardner; Alyssa Healy (wk); Jess Jonassen; Delissa Kimmince; Sophie Molineux; Beth Mooney; Ellyse Perry; Megan Schutt; Elyse Villani; Tayla Vlaeminck; Georgia Wareham |

Sophie Molineux was added to Australia's squad for the one-off Test match and the WT20Is, after she had recovered from a shoulder injury. Ahead of the WT20I series, Jenny Gunn was ruled out of England's squad due to a side strain. Sarah Taylor withdrew herself from England's WT20I squad, due to mental health issues. She was replaced by Fran Wilson.

== Tour matches ==
=== 50-over match: England Academy v Australia ===
26 June 2019
10:30
Scorecard

| England Academy; 184/7 (39 overs) | v | Australia; 186/4 (31.2 overs) |
| Bryony Smith 68 (84); Jess Jonassen 3/19 (6 overs) | | Rachael Haynes 55* (62); Freya Davies 2/22 (7 overs) |

Australia Women won by 6 wickets
Haslegrave Ground, Loughborough
Umpires: Sue Redfern (Eng) and Mary Waldron (Ire)

- Australia Women won the toss and elected to field.
- The match was reduced to 39 overs per side due to rain.

=== 50-over match: England Academy v Australia ===
28 June 2019
10:30
Scorecard

| Australia; 337/5 (50 overs) | v | England Academy; 269/9 (50 overs) |
| Meg Lanning 96 (98); Alice Davidson-Richards 2/50 (7 overs) | | Fran Wilson 91 (87); Ashleigh Gardner 2/19 (4 overs) |

Australia Women won by 68 runs
Haslegrave Ground, Loughborough
Umpires: Sue Redfern (Eng) and Mary Waldron (Ire)

- Australia Women won the toss and elected to bat.

=== 50-over match: England v Australia A ===
29 June 2019
10:30
Scorecard

| England; 341/8 (50 overs) | v | Australia A 260/9 (50 overs) |
| Danni Wyatt 93 (100); Sammy-Jo Johnson 3/64 (10 overs) | | Rachel Trenaman 73 (118); Laura Marsh 4/48 (10 overs) |

England Women won by 81 runs
Haslegrave Ground, Loughborough
Umpires: Huw Davies (Eng) and Anthony Harris (Eng)

- England Women won the toss and elected to bat.

=== Three-day match: England Academy v Australia ===
11–13 July 2019
Scorecard

| Australia | v | England Academy |
| 360/5d (83.4 overs); Beth Mooney 101* (138); Kirstie Gordon 2/43 (13 overs) | | 165 (57.5 overs); Mady Villiers 50* (93); Tayla Vlaeminck 4/31 (8 overs) |
| 274/9d (62.3 overs); Ellyse Perry 112 (157); Kirstie Gordon 6/85 (16 overs) | | 229 (69.2 overs); Fran Wilson 52 (79); Sophie Molineux 4/30 (15 overs) |

Australia Women won by 240 runs
Marlborough College Ground, Marlborough
Umpires: Dave Gower (Eng) and Justin Pitcher (Eng)

- Australia Women won the toss and elected to bat.

=== Three-day match: England v Australia A ===
12–14 July 2019
Scorecard

| England | v | Australia A |
| 343/2d (85 overs); Amy Jones 115 (172) | | 218 (75.4 overs); Georgia Redmayne 76 (157); Katherine Brunt 2/20 (10 overs) |
| 318/5d (78 overs); Nat Sciver 103 (149); Tahlia McGrath 1/26 (9 overs) | | 124 (31.5 overs); Tahlia McGrath 33 (58); Katherine Brunt 2/11 (4 overs) |

England Women won by 319 runs
Millfield School, Street
Umpires: Sam Hollingshead (Eng) and Ben Peverall (Eng)

- England Women won the toss and elected to bat.

== WODI series ==
=== 1st WODI ===
2 July 2019
14:00 (D/N)
Scorecard

| England; 177 (46.5 overs) | v | Australia; 178/8 (42.3 overs) |
| Nat Sciver 64 (95); Ellyse Perry 3/43 (7 overs) | | Alyssa Healy 66 (71); Sophie Ecclestone 3/34 (10 overs) |

Australia Women won by 2 wickets
Grace Road, Leicester
Umpires: Tim Robinson (Eng) and Martin Saggers (Eng)
Player of the match: Ellyse Perry (Aus)

- Australia Women won the toss and elected to field.
- Ashes points: Australia Women 2, England Women 0.

=== 2nd WODI ===
4 July 2019
14:00 (D/N)
Scorecard

| England; 217 (47.4 overs) | v | Australia; 218/6 (45.2 overs) |
| Tammy Beaumont 114 (115); Delissa Kimmince 5/26 (7.4 overs) | | Ellyse Perry 62 (79); Anya Shrubsole 3/47 (10 overs) |

Australia Women won by 4 wickets
Grace Road, Leicester
Umpires: Graham Lloyd (Eng) and Tim Robinson (Eng)
Player of the match: Delissa Kimmince (Aus)

- England Women won the toss and elected to bat.
- Tammy Beaumont scored the first century in a WODI by an England cricketer in the Women's Ashes.
- Delissa Kimmince (Aus) took her first five-wicket haul in WODIs.
- Ashes points: Australia Women 2, England Women 0.

=== 3rd WODI ===
7 July 2019
11:00
Scorecard

| Australia; 269/7 (50 overs) | v | England; 75 (32.5 overs) |
| Meg Lanning 69 (68); Nat Sciver 3/51 (8 overs) | | Laura Marsh 21 (45); Ellyse Perry 7/22 (10 overs) |

Australia Women won by 194 runs
St Lawrence Ground, Canterbury
Umpires: Graham Lloyd (Eng) and Martin Saggers (Eng)
Player of the match: Ellyse Perry (Aus)

- England Women won the toss and elected to field.
- Ellyse Perry took the best bowling figures for an Australian in WODIs.
- This was England women's lowest total against Australia women in WODIs.
- Ashes points: Australia Women 2, England Women 0.

== Only Test ==
18–21 July 2019
Scorecard

| Australia | v | England |
| 420/8d (154.4 overs); Ellyse Perry 116 (281); Katherine Brunt 2/48 (22 overs) | | 275/9d (107.1 overs); Nat Sciver 88 (180); Sophie Molineux 4/95 (37 overs) |
| 230/7 (64 overs); Ellyse Perry 76* (144); Heather Knight 2/25 (8 overs) |

Match drawn
County Ground, Taunton
Umpires: Martin Saggers (Eng) and Alex Wharf (Eng)
Player of the match: Ellyse Perry (Aus)

- Australia Women won the toss and elected to bat.
- No play was possible after lunch on Day 2 due to rain.
- Kirstie Gordon, Amy Jones (Eng), Ashleigh Gardner, Sophie Molineux and Tayla Vlaeminck (Aus) all made their Test debuts.
- Ellyse Perry (Aus) set a new record for the most runs scored between dismissals in women's Test cricket (329).
- Ashes points: Australia Women 2, England Women 2.

== WT20I series ==
=== 1st WT20I ===
26 July 2019
19:15 (D/N)
Scorecard

| Australia; 226/3 (20 overs) | v | England; 133/9 (20 overs) |
| Meg Lanning 133* (63); Sophie Ecclestone 2/42 (4 overs) | | Lauren Winfield 33 (27); Megan Schutt 3/25 (4 overs) |

Australia Women won by 93 runs
County Cricket Ground, Chelmsford
Umpires: Mike Burns (Eng) and Alex Wharf (Eng)
Player of the match: Meg Lanning (Aus)

- England Women won the toss and elected to field.
- Meg Lanning (Aus) scored the highest individual total in WT20Is.
- Australia women made their highest total in WT20Is.
- This was England women's biggest defeat, in terms of runs, in WT20Is.
- Ashes points: Australia Women 2, England Women 0.

=== 2nd WT20I ===
28 July 2019
14:00
Scorecard

| England; 121/8 (20 overs) | v | Australia; 122/3 (17.5 overs) |
| Tammy Beaumont 43 (39); Jess Jonassen 2/19 (4 overs) | | Ellyse Perry 47* (39); Sophie Ecclestone 1/18 (4 overs) |

Australia Women won by 7 wickets
County Cricket Ground, Hove
Umpires: Mike Burns (Eng) and Alex Wharf (Eng)
Player of the match: Ellyse Perry (Aus)

- England Women won the toss and elected to bat.
- Ellyse Perry (Aus) became the first player, male or female, to score 1,000 runs and take 100 wickets in Twenty20 International cricket.
- Ashes points: Australia Women 2, England Women 0.

=== 3rd WT20I ===
31 July 2019
18:30 (D/N)
Scorecard

| England; 139/5 (20 overs) | v | Australia; 122/8 (20 overs) |
| Katherine Brunt 26* (20); Tayla Vlaeminck 1/9 (2 overs) | | Ellyse Perry 60* (50); Katherine Brunt 3/21 (4 overs) |

England Women won by 17 runs
Bristol County Ground, Bristol
Umpires: Mike Burns (Eng) and Alex Wharf (Eng)
Player of the match: Katherine Brunt (Eng)

- Australia Women won the toss and elected to field.
- Mady Villiers (Eng) made her WT20I debut.
- Ashes points: England Women 2, Australia Women 0.
