= Points system (cricket) =

Cricket terminology

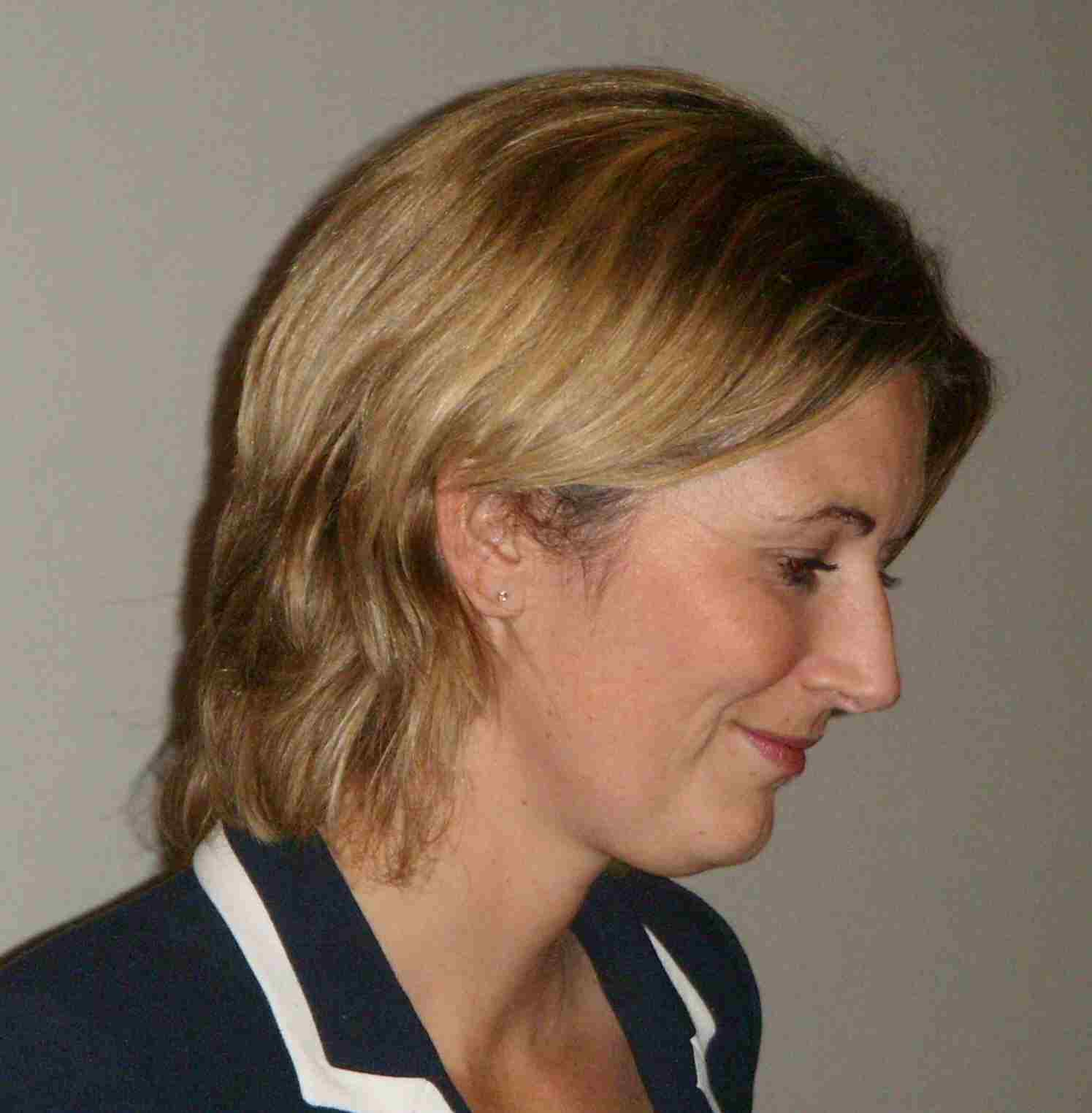
Charlotte Edwards, who captained the England women's cricket team in the 2013 Women's Ashes series, the first time a multiformat points system was used.

In cricket, a points system is a method for determining the winner of a cricket series involving multiple formats of cricket matches. The method awards teams points for winning Test, One Day International and T20I matches, with the winner being determined by the team with the highest total score. The system was first introduced in women's cricket for the 2013 Women's Ashes series, and continues to be in use for the Women's Ashes. A multi-format points system was also used in men's cricket in 2016.

== Women's cricket ==
A multi-format points system was first introduced for the 2013 Women's Ashes series in England; the series consisted of one Test match, three One Day Internationals and two Twenty20 Internationals. Six points were awarded for winning the Test match, with two points each if drawn, and two points for winning a limited overs match, and one point each if the match was drawn. Talking about the points system, then England captain Charlotte Edwards said "It preserves Test cricket, which is the most important thing, but equally we get to play the more popular formats which are one day and Twenty20 which the media and the public has a huge demand for." England won the series 12–4 after the test match was drawn, Australia won one ODI and England won two ODIs and all three T20Is. The system was used again in the 2013–14 women's Ashes in Australia, with England winning 10–8, despite winning fewer matches; England won the test match, one ODI and one T20I, while Australia won two ODIs and two T20Is.

For the 2015 Women's Ashes series, the points system was changed, so that four points were awarded for a test match win, rather than six. Australian coach Matthew Mott described this updated system as fairer, as "Whether you win or lose the Test match, it doesn't really disadvantage or advantage you." Australia won the series 10–6. The 2017–18 Women's Ashes was tied 8–8. Australia also won the 2019 Women's Ashes series 12–4.

In 2021, the points system was used for India's tour of England, the first time that it had been used in women's cricket outside of the Ashes. The points system was the same as the Women's Ashes, with four points for winning the Test match, two points if the Test is drawn, and two points for each win in the limited overs matches. England beat India 10–6 in the multi-format series. The same system was used for India's tour of Australia later in 2021; Australia won the series 11–5. The Test match was drawn, Australia won the WODI series 2–1. and the T20 series 2–0, The first WT20I finished with no result due to rain. The same points system was used in the 2022 series between England and South Africa. England won the series 14–2, after winning all the limited-overs matches; the Test match between the sides was drawn.

== Men's cricket ==
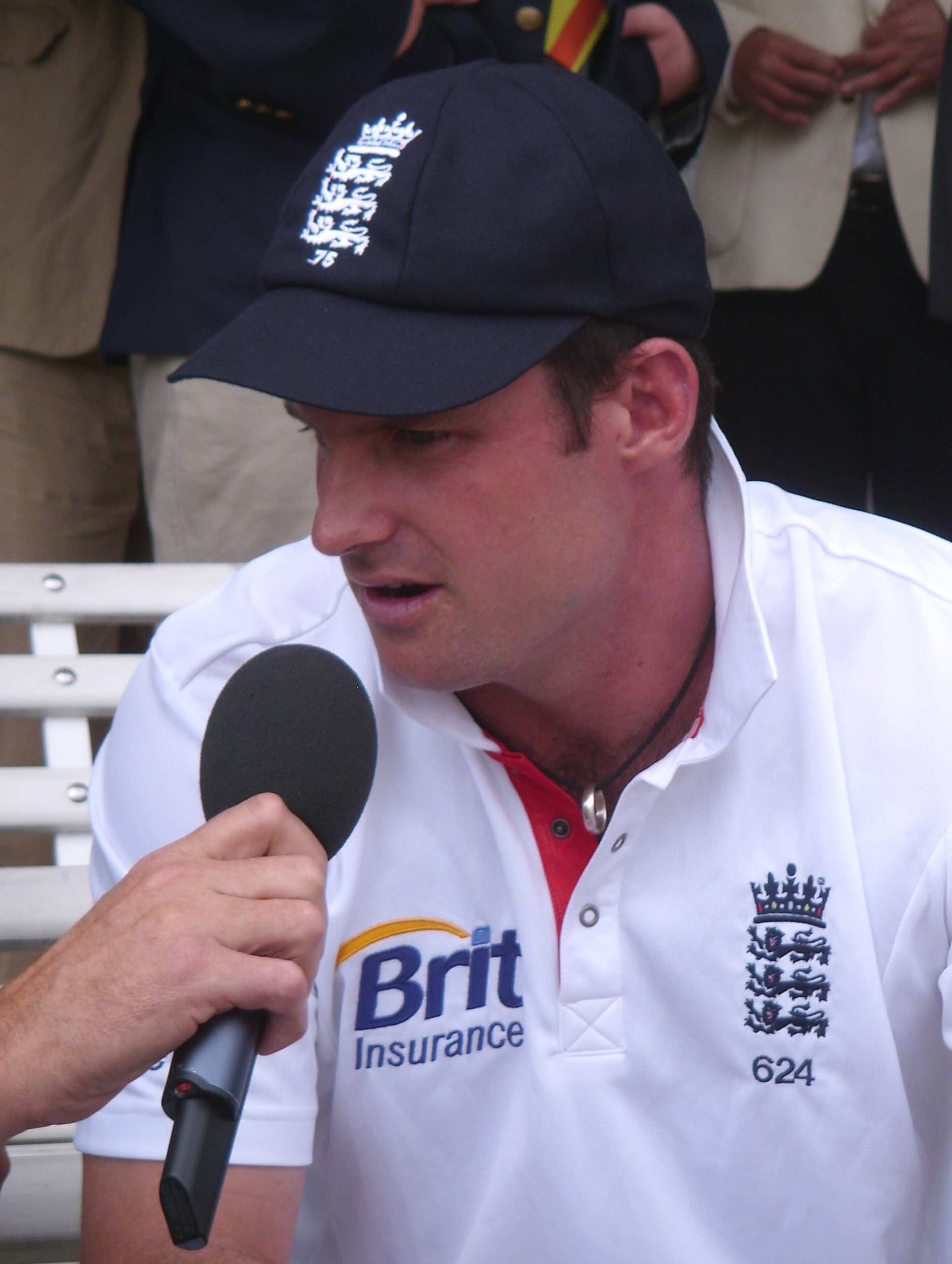
Andrew Strauss, who announced the first use of the points system in men's cricket

In May 2016, it was confirmed that a multiformat points system would be used for England's summer series against Sri Lanka and Pakistan. The points system would be the same as the system used in the 2015 Women's Ashes series, with four points being awarded for winning a Test match, and two points being awarded for winning a One Day International or Twenty20 International. The winning team under the points system will be awarded £25,000. Director of England Cricket Andrew Strauss, who announced the new points system, said that "We're trying to create more context to every game that's played." Sri Lankan captain Angelo Mathews was opposed to the points system, saying "I don’t like to move away from the traditional game but whatever the administrators decide we’ll have to go with and move on", whilst former England captain Michael Vaughan called the new system "nonsense". Former Australian bowler Jason Gillespie said that the points system was worth a trial, as it had been successful in The Women's Ashes. England won on points in both tours, 20–4 and 16–12. The points system has not been used again in men's international cricket.
