= England women's cricket team in Australia in 2010–11 =

English women's cricket team in Australia in 2010–2011
	Australia	England
Captains	Alex Blackwell	Charlotte Edwards

Test series
- Result: Australia won the 1-match series 1–0

One Day International series
- Results: Australia won the 3-match series 2–1
Most runs	Meg Lanning (124)	Charlotte Edwards (188)
Most wickets	Lisa Sthalekar (5)	Jenny Gunn (4)
- Player of the series: Charlotte Edwards (Eng)

Twenty20 International series
- Results: England won the 5-match series 4–1
Most runs	Leah Poulton (128)	Lydia Greenway (152)
Most wickets	Shelley Nitschke (8)	Holly Colvin (8)

The English women's cricket team toured Australia in early 2011, where they were defending the Women's Ashes. Australia won 2 one-day internationals to England's 1, while England won 4 Twenty20 matches to Australia's 1. The only Test match played was won by Australia, who thus regained the Women's Ashes.

== Squads ==
=== English women's squad ===
- Charlotte Edwards (captain, Kent)
- Katherine Brunt (Yorkshire)
- Holly Colvin (Sussex)
- Jenny Gunn (vice-captain, Nottinghamshire)
- Lydia Greenway (Kent)
- Lauren Griffiths (Cheshire)
- Isa Guha (Berkshire)
- Danielle Hazell (Yorkshire)
- Heather Knight (Berkshire)
- Laura Marsh (Sussex)
- Beth Morgan (Middlesex)
- Susie Rowe (Kent)
- Claire Taylor (Berkshire)
- Fran Wilson (Somerset)
- Danni Wyatt (Staffordshire)

== One Day International series ==
=== 1st ODI ===
5 January 2011
10:00
Scorecard

Australia; 194/7 (44 overs)	v	England; 151/9 (39.3 overs)
Alex Blackwell 42 (69); Jenny Gunn 3/28 (8 overs)		Charlotte Edwards 50 (85); Lisa Sthalekar 2/28 (9 overs)

Australia won by 33 runs (D/L)
WACA Ground, Perth
Umpires: Ian Lock and Mick Martell
Player of the match: Shelley Nitschke (Aus)

- Australia won the toss and elected to bat.
- Rain reduced England's target to 185 runs from 39.3 overs according to the Duckworth–Lewis method.

=== 2nd ODI ===
7 January 2011
14:30
Scorecard

England; 214/8 (50 overs)	v	Australia; 215/1 (41.3 overs)
Charlotte Edwards 90 (110); Rene Farrell 2/38 (10 overs)		Meg Lanning 104 (118); Laura Marsh 1/38 (10 overs)

Australia won by 9 wickets
WACA Ground, Perth
Umpires: Nathan Johnstone and Ian Lock
Player of the match: Meg Lanning (Aus)

- England won the toss and elected to bat.

=== 3rd ODI ===
9 January 2011
10:00
Scorecard

Australia; 212 (50 overs)	v	England; 213/3 (48 overs)
Lisa Sthalekar 60 (75); Isa Guha 2/40 (10 overs)		Lydia Greenway 59 (83); Rachael Haynes 1/5 (2 overs)

England won by 7 wickets
WACA Ground, Perth
Umpires: Nathan Johnstone and Todd Rann
Player of the match: Lydia Greenway (Eng)

- Australia won the toss and elected to bat.

== Twenty20 Internationals ==
=== 1st T20I ===
12 January 2011
14:05
Scorecard

Australia; 140/5 (20 overs)	v	England; 144/6 (18.2 overs)
Lisa Sthalekar 38 (29); Holly Colvin 2/21 (4 overs)		Lydia Greenway 39* (27); Sarah Coyte 3/18 (3.2 overs)

England won by 4 wickets
Adelaide Oval, Adelaide
Umpires: Mick Martell and Paul Wilson
Player of the match: Lydia Greenway (Eng)

- Australia won the toss and elected to bat.

=== 2nd T20I ===
14 January 2011
14:35
Scorecard

Australia; 99/3 (16 overs)	v	England; 100/5 (15.4 overs)
Shelley Nitschke 27 (30); Danielle Hazell 1/16 (3 overs)		Lydia Greenway 30* (30); Lisa Sthalekar 3/15 (4 overs)

England won by 5 wickets
Melbourne Cricket Ground, Melbourne
Umpires: Geoff Joshua and Tony Ward
Player of the match: Lydia Greenway (Eng)

- Australia won the toss and elected to bat.
- Rain reduced the match to 16 overs per side.

=== 3rd T20I ===
16 January 2011
12:05
Scorecard

Australia; 145/6 (20 overs)	v	England; 146/6 (19.5 overs)
Meg Lanning 34 (22); Isa Guha 3/24 (4 overs)		Laura Marsh 45 (44); Sarah Coyte 3/25 (4 overs)

England won by 4 wickets
Manuka Oval, Canberra
Umpires: Gerard Abood and Michael Kumutat
Player of the match: Laura Marsh (Eng)

- Australia won the toss and elected to bat.

=== 4th T20I ===
17 January 2011
15:05
Scorecard

England; 144 (19.5 overs)	v	Australia; 131/6 (20 overs)
Laura Marsh 43 (28); Shelley Nitschke 3/19 (4 overs)		Leah Poulton 32 (24); Holly Colvin 2/25 (4 overs)

England won by 13 runs
Manuka Oval, Canberra
Umpires: Gerard Abood and Michael Kumutat
Player of the match: Laura Marsh (Eng)

- England won the toss and elected to bat.

=== 5th T20I ===
18 January 2011
15:05
Scorecard

Australia; 153/8 (20 overs)	v	England; 101 (16.2 overs)
Jess Cameron 26 (21); Holly Colvin 2/30 (4 overs)		Charlotte Edwards 37 (28); Shelley Nitschke 3/16 (4 overs)

Australia won by 52 runs
Manuka Oval, Canberra
Umpires: Gerard Abood and Michael Kumutat
Player of the match: Shelley Nitschke (Aus)

- Australia won the toss and elected to bat.

== Test ==
=== Test Match ===
22 – 25 January 2011
Scorecard

England	v	Australia
207 (119.3 overs); Charlotte Edwards 114* (310); Ellyse Perry 4/56 (28 overs)		159/9d (71 overs); Alyssa Healy 37 (74); Isa Guha 3/27 (13 overs)
149 (90.4 overs); Jenny Gunn 30 (80); Rene Farrell 5/23 (17 overs)		198/3 (91.2 overs); Sarah Elliott 81* (262); Katherine Brunt 2/39 (22 overs)

Australia won by 7 wickets
Bankstown Oval, Sydney
Umpires: Ashley Barrow and Paul Wilson
Player of the match: Rene Farrell (Aus)

- England won the toss and elected to bat.
- Jess Cameron, Sarah Coyte, Sarah Elliott, Alyssa Healy (Aus), Lauren Griffiths, Danielle Hazell and Heather Knight (Eng) all made their Test debuts.
