= The Women's Ashes =

International cricket series between England and Australia

- Countries: Australia; England
- Administrator: Cricket Australia; ECB
- Format: Mixed, points based system
- First edition: 1934–35 (Australia)
- Latest edition: 2024–25 (Australia)
- Tournament format: Series
- Current champion: Australia
- Most successful: Australia (11 titles)
- Most runs: (Australia) Ellyse Perry (1761) (Note: Unfortunately, some matches from the 2021–22 series have been excluded from the record, meaning these numbers are likely an underestimation.)
- Most wickets: (Australia) Ellyse Perry (66)

The Women's Ashes is the perpetual trophy in women's international cricket series between England and Australia. The name derives from the historic precedent of the Ashes in cricket and, until 2013, was similarly decided exclusively on the outcomes of Test matches.

Since the Australian tour of England in 2013, the competition is decided on a points system, taking account of One-Day Internationals and Twenty20 International matches as well as Tests. Four (previously six) points are awarded for a Test victory (two points to each side in the event of a draw), and two points for a victory in a limited-overs game.

== History ==
Heralded in 1931, the first women's Test series between England and Australia—the first women's Test series anywhere—was played in 1934–35. At that time, according to the English captain, Betty Archdale, women played only "for love of the game" and did not wish to be associated with the male concepts of Tests and Ashes.

A total of 24 series have taken place, with 51 Test matches played (and one scheduled Test abandoned). The length of series has varied between one and five Tests. Series have been played biennially since 2001, with only one or two tests played in a series. Since the 2013 series, One Day Internationals and Twenty20 International matches have counted, as well as Tests, toward the trophy result. As of 2015, a Test victory is worth four points (two to each side for a draw), and two points are awarded for victory in a limited-overs match.

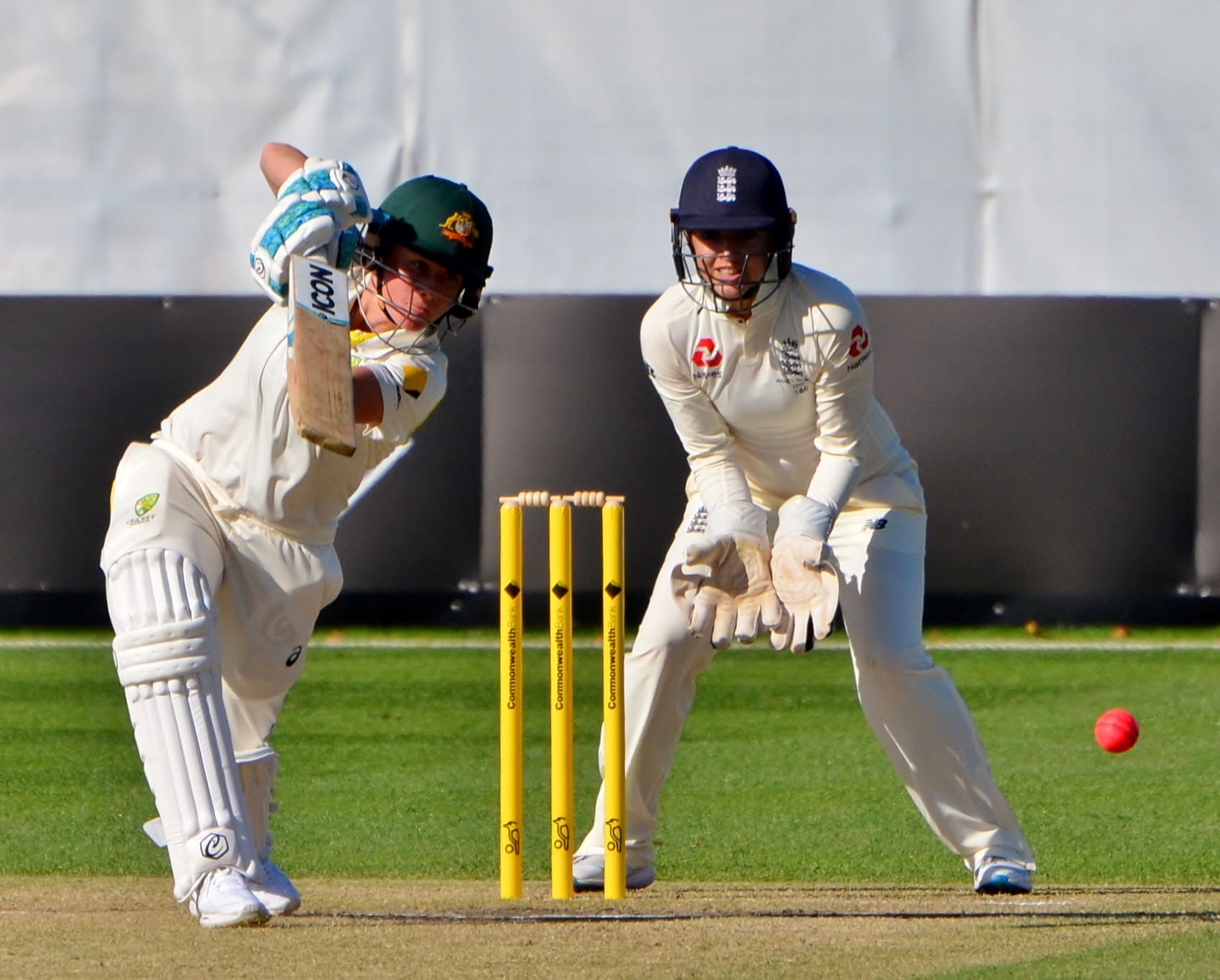
Australian Beth Mooney batting in the 2017–18 Women's Ashes Test at North Sydney Oval with England's Sarah Taylor keeping wicket behind her.

In February 2007, England Women travelled to Australia to defend the Women's Ashes, doing so successfully by winning the one-off Test in Bowral by six wickets. In July 2009, England retained the Women's Ashes after the one-off test at Worcester ended in a draw. In January 2011 Australia was victorious, winning a one-off test in Sydney. England regained the trophy on the new points system in August 2013, and successfully defended it in a series played in Australia in January–February 2014. Australia succeeded in regaining the trophy during the 2015 series played in England.

Since that series, Australia has retained the trophy in five consecutive series—2017–18, 2019, 2021–22, 2023 and 2024–25—making them the current holder of the trophy.

== Trophy ==
Before the ODI series in July 1998, the president of the Women's Cricket Association, Norma Izard devised a way for the women to have a trophy of their own, like the Ashes urn. The England and Australia players both signed a miniature cricket bat which was burned at Lord's in a wok alongside a copy of the Women's Cricket Association (WCA) constitution and rulebook, as the WCA had voted 4 months earlier to merge with England and Wales Cricket Board. Izard had commissioned a trophy to hold them: a wooden cricket ball carved from yew.

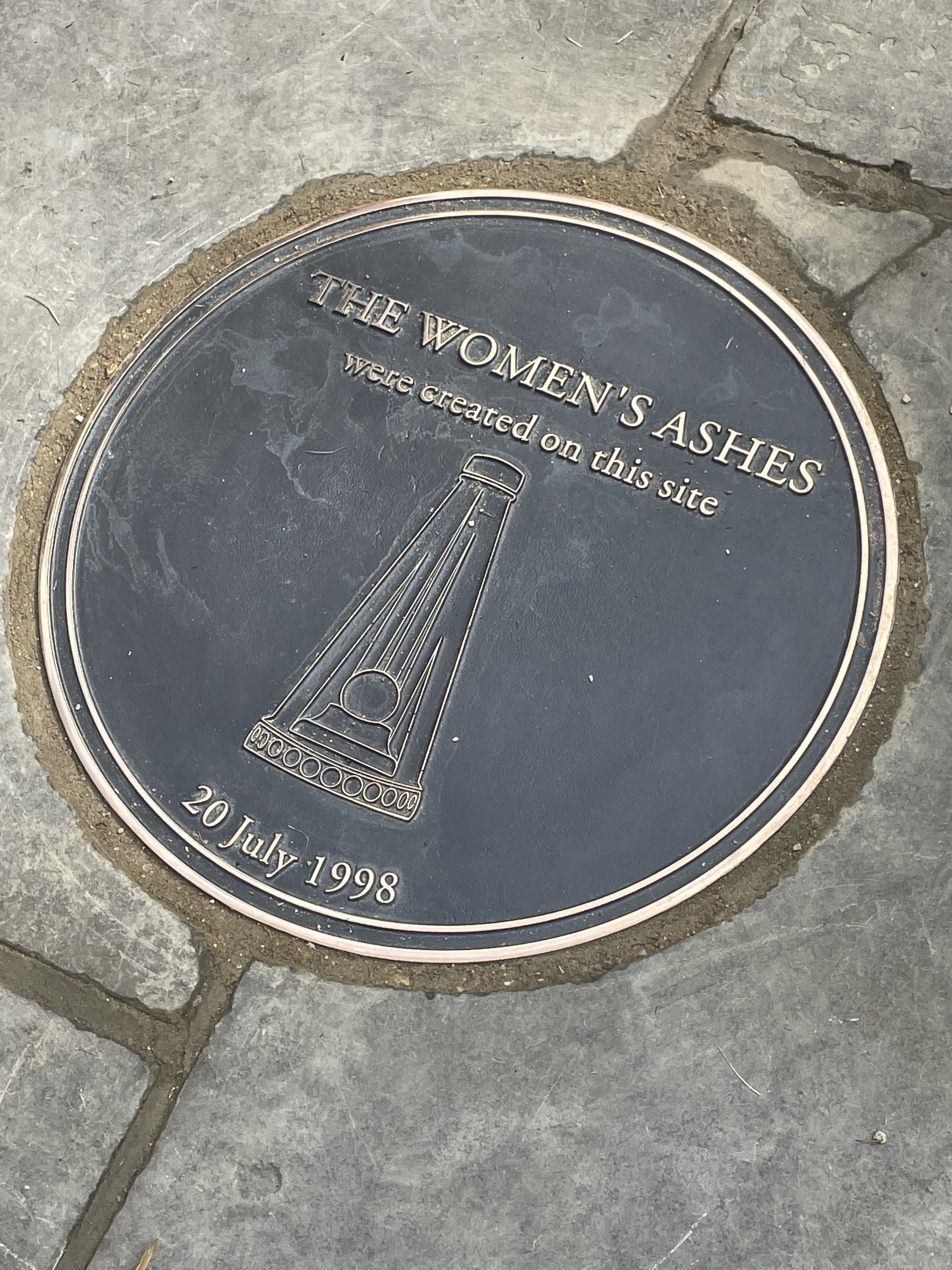
The plaque commemorating the Women's Ashes trophy creation at Lord's.

Following the 2001 series, the Australian team took an empty replica home with them and the ball containing the ashes remained in the Lord's museum. However, in the intervening years, one of the two wooden balls went missing. When the ECB and Cricket Australia commissioned a new trophy, the remaining ball became the focal point of the new trophy, inside nine stumps. Because of this, it remains unclear if the modern trophy contains those original ashes or not.

In July 2023, to mark the 25th anniversary of the trophy's creation, the MCC unveiled a plaque at Lord's.

== Results summary ==
	Played	Won by Australia	Won by England	Drawn	Ref
All series	26	11	6	9	
Series in Australia	13	7	3	3	
Series in England	13	4	3	6	

=== Test (until 2010–11) ===
	Played	Won by Australia	Won by England	Drawn	Ref
All Tests	45	11	8	26	
Tests in Australia	22	6	4	12	
Test in England	23	5	4	14	
All series	18	7	4	7	
Series in Australia	9	5	2	2	
Series in England	9	2	2	5	

=== Multi-format (from 2013) ===
	Played	Won by Australia	Won by England	Drawn	Ref
All Matches	55	31	18	4	
Matches in Australia	27	18	5	2	
Matches in England	28	13	13	2	
All series	8	4	2	2	
Series in Australia	4	2	1	1	
Series in England	4	2	1	1	

== Series ==
Series decided on Test results:

Series	Season	Played in	First match	Tests played (sched)	Tests won by Australia	Tests won by England	Tests drawn	Series result	Holder at series end
1	1934–35	Australia	28 December 1934	3	0	2	1	England	England
2	1937	England	12 June 1937	3	1	1	1	Drawn	England
3	1948–49	Australia	15 January 1949	3	1	0	2	Australia	Australia
4	1951	England	16 June 1951	3	1	1	1	Drawn	Australia
5	1957–58	Australia	7 February 1958	3 (4)	0	0	3	Drawn	Australia
6	1963	England	15 June 1963	3	0	1	2	England	England
7	1968–69	Australia	27 December 1968	3	0	0	3	Drawn	England
8	1976	England	19 June 1976	3	0	0	3	Drawn	England
9	1984–85	Australia	13 December 1984	5	2	1	2	Australia	Australia
10	1987	England	1 August 1987	3	1	0	2	Australia	Australia
11	1991–92	Australia	19 February 1992	1	1	0	0	Australia	Australia
12	1998	England	6 August 1998	3	0	0	3	Drawn	Australia
13	2001	England	24 June 2001	2	2	0	0	Australia	Australia
14	2002–03	Australia	15 February 2003	2	1	0	1	Australia	Australia
15	2005	England	9 August 2005	2	0	1	1	England	England
16	2007–08	Australia	15 February 2008	1	0	1	0	England	England
17	2009	England	10 July 2009	1	0	0	1	Drawn	England
18	2010–11	Australia	22 January 2011	1	1	0	0	Australia	Australia

Series decided on a points system:

Series	Season	Played in	First match	Test	ODIs	Twenty20s	Australia points	England points	Series result	Holder at series end
19	2013	England	11 August 2013	Drawn	Eng 2–1 Aus	Eng 3–0 Aus	4	12	England	England
20	2013–14	Australia	10 January 2014	Eng	Aus 2–1 Eng	Aus 2–1 Eng	8	10	England	England
21	2015	England	21 July 2015	Aus	Eng 1–2 Aus	Eng 2–1 Aus	10	6	Australia	Australia
22	2017–18	Australia	22 October 2017	Drawn	Aus 2–1 Eng	Aus 1–2 Eng	8	8	Drawn	Australia
23	2019	England	2 July 2019	Drawn	Eng 0–3 Aus	Eng 1–2 Aus	12	4	Australia	Australia
24	2021–22	Australia	20 January 2022	Drawn	Aus 3–0 Eng	Aus 1–0 Eng (2 no results)	12	4	Australia	Australia
25	2023	England	22 June 2023	Aus	Eng 2–1 Aus	Eng 2–1 Aus	8	8	Drawn	Australia
26	2024–25	Australia	12 January 2025	Aus	Aus 3–0 Eng	Aus 3–0 Eng	16	0	Australia	Australia

== Player statistics ==
=== Tests (until 2010–11) ===
==== Batting ====
Most runs

Runs	Player	Matches	Highest	Average	100	50	Span
1024	(England) Jan Brittin	11	167	56.88	3	5	1984–1998
919	(England) Myrtle Maclagan	12	119	43.76	2	6	1934–1951
896	(England) Charlotte Edwards	10	114*	56.00	1	7	1998–2011
874	(Australia) Karen Rolton	11	209*	58.26	2	4	1998–2009
740	(England) Rachael Heyhoe Flint	9	179	49.33	2	4	1963–1976

==== Bowling ====
Most wickets

Wickets	Player	Matches	BBI	Average	Economy	5	10	Span
53	(Australia) Betty Wilson	9	7/7	12.69	1.67	3	1	1949–1958
52	(Australia) Cathryn Fitzpatrick	9	5/29	18.26	2.01	2	0	1998–2005
51	(England) Myrtle Maclagan	12	7/10	16.90	1.68	2	0	1934–1951
47	(England) Mary Duggan	11	7/6	14.76	1.88	3	0	1949–1963
31	(Australia) Peggy Antonio	6	6/49	13.90	2.61	3	0	1934–1937

=== Multi-format (from 2013) ===
Player names in bold text are current international players.

==== Batting (all matches) ====
Most runs (Note: For any player who participated in the series prior to 2013, those scores have been subtracted to achieve their post 2013 records.)

Runs	Player	Matches	Highest	Average	100	50	Span
1693	(Australia) **Ellyse Perry**	36	213*	62.7	2	12	2013-2023
1182	(England) **Heather Knight**	33	157	35.82	1	10	2013-2023
1119	(England) **Nat Sciver-Brunt**	34	129	37.30	2	5	2013–2023
1033	(Australia) **Meg Lanning**	25	133*	39.73	2	6	2013–2019
774	(Australia) **Alyssa Healy**	32	71	25.8	0	6	2013-2023

Updated to include 2023 Women's Ashes, however some matches for the 2021-22 Women's Ashes are missing from the records.

==== Bowling (all matches) ====
Most wickets

Wickets	Player	Matches	BBI	Average	Economy	5	Span
59	(Australia) **Ellyse Perry**	42	7/22	16.29	2.79	3	2013-2023
45	(Australia) **Megan Schutt**	28	4/22	19.15	3.36	0	2013–2023
41	(Australia) **Jess Jonassen**	34	4/38	26.46	3.86	0	2013–2023
39	(England) Katherine Sciver-Brunt	26	6/69	29.03	3.6	1	2013-2022
37	(England) **Sophie Ecclestone**	17	5/63	25.08	3.57	2	2017–2023

Updated to include 2023 Women's Ashes however some matches for the 2021-22 Women's Ashes are missing from the records..
