= Sarah Taylor (cricketer) =

English cricketer (born 1989)

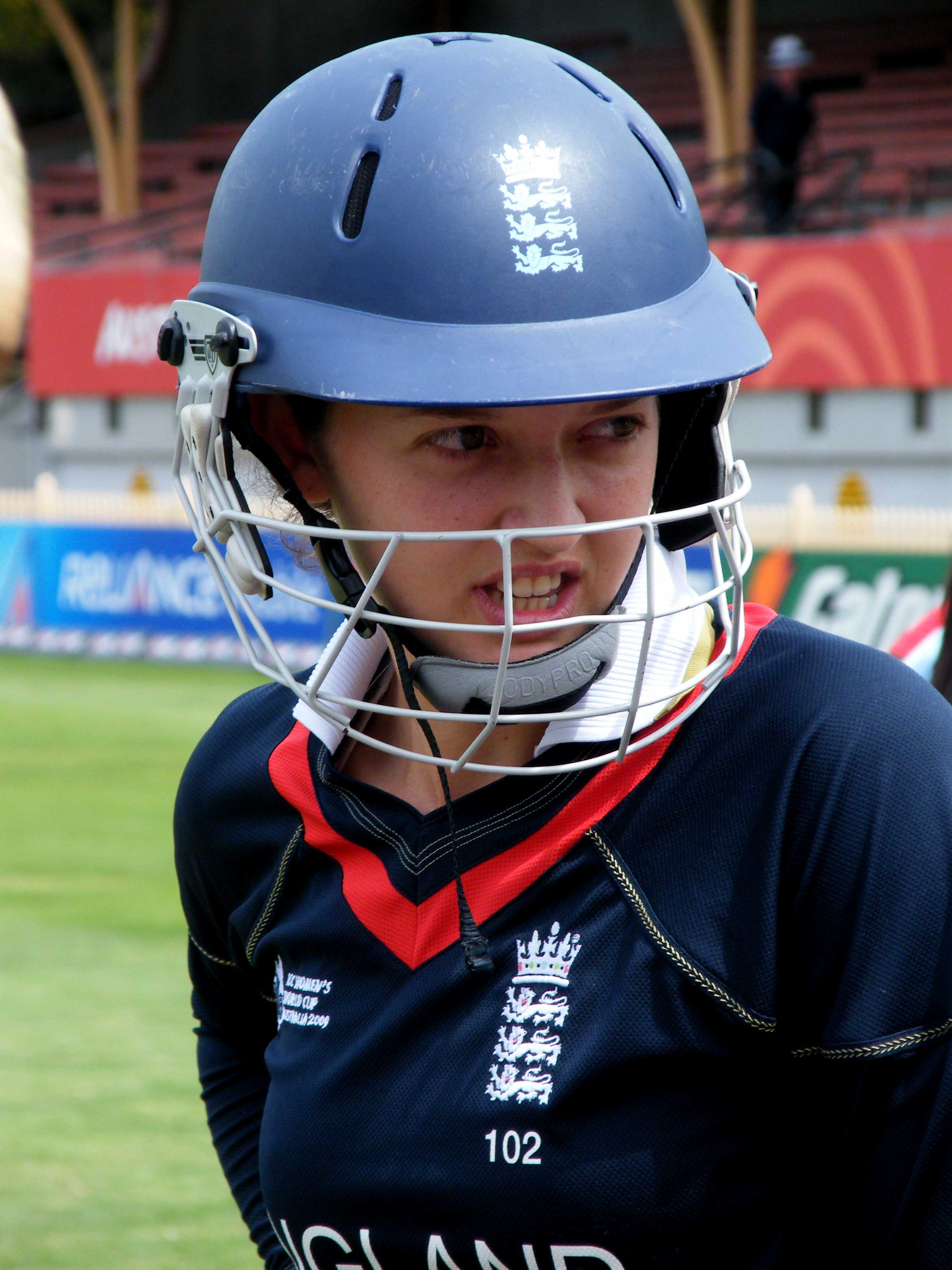
- Taylor at the 2009 Women's Cricket World Cup

Personal information
- Full name: Sarah Jane Taylor
- Born: 20 May 1989 (age 37); Whitechapel, London, England
- Batting: Right-handed
- Role: Wicket-keeper-batter

International information
- National side: England (2006–2019)
- Test debut (cap 146): 8 August 2006 v India
- Last Test: 18 July 2019 v Australia
- ODI debut (cap 102): 14 August 2006 v India
- Last ODI: 7 July 2019 v Australia
- ODI shirt no.: 30
- T20I debut (cap 17): 5 August 2006 v India
- Last T20I: 21 June 2019 v West Indies

Domestic team information
- Years: Team
- 2004–2021: Sussex
- 2010/11–2011/12: Wellington
- 2014/15–2015/16: South Australia
- 2015/16: Adelaide Strikers
- 2017: Lancashire Thunder
- 2018–2019: Surrey Stars
- 2021: Northern Diamonds
- 2021: Welsh Fire

Career statistics
Competition	WTest	WODI	WT20I	WLA
Matches	10	126	90	256
Runs scored	300	4,056	2,177	8,647
Batting average	18.75	38.26	29.02	41.97
100s/50s	0/0	7/20	0/16	13/54
Top score	40	147	77	147
Catches/stumpings	18/2	87/51	23/51	153/107
- Source: CricketArchive, 28 September 2021

Sarah Jane Taylor (born 20 May 1989) is an English former cricketer and cricket coach. She appeared in 10 Test matches, 126 One Day Internationals and 90 Twenty20 Internationals for England between 2006 and her retirement from international cricket in 2019. Taylor is the fastest cricketer, male or female, to earn their first cap in all three formats of international cricket, doing so in the space of nine days against India in 2006.

She has played domestic cricket for Sussex, Lancashire Thunder, Surrey Stars, Northern Diamonds, Welsh Fire, Wellington, South Australia and Adelaide Strikers. She is a wicket-keeper-batter known for her free-flowing stroke play, opening the batting in limited-overs matches and batting in the middle order in Test cricket.

== Playing career ==
The inclusion of Taylor and her future England team-mate Holly Colvin in the Brighton College boys' team caused some controversy within the MCC.

On 30 June 2009, she scored 120 at a run-a-ball in the 2nd One Day International at Chelmsford, overtaking Enid Bakewell's 118 in 1973 as the highest individual score against Australia by an Englishwoman. On 8 August 2008, she broke the record for the highest stand in women's One Day International cricket with a first wicket partnership of 268 with Caroline Atkins at Lord's for England against South Africa. She went on to score 129.

On 1 September 2008 she became the youngest woman cricketer to score 1000 runs in One Day Internationals when she scored 75 not out at Taunton in England's 10 wicket win against India. She reached 1000 runs when she had scored 16.

At the start of the cricket season she was the first woman player ever to play in the Darton first XI. She has also been joined at Darton by Katherine Brunt, England bowler.

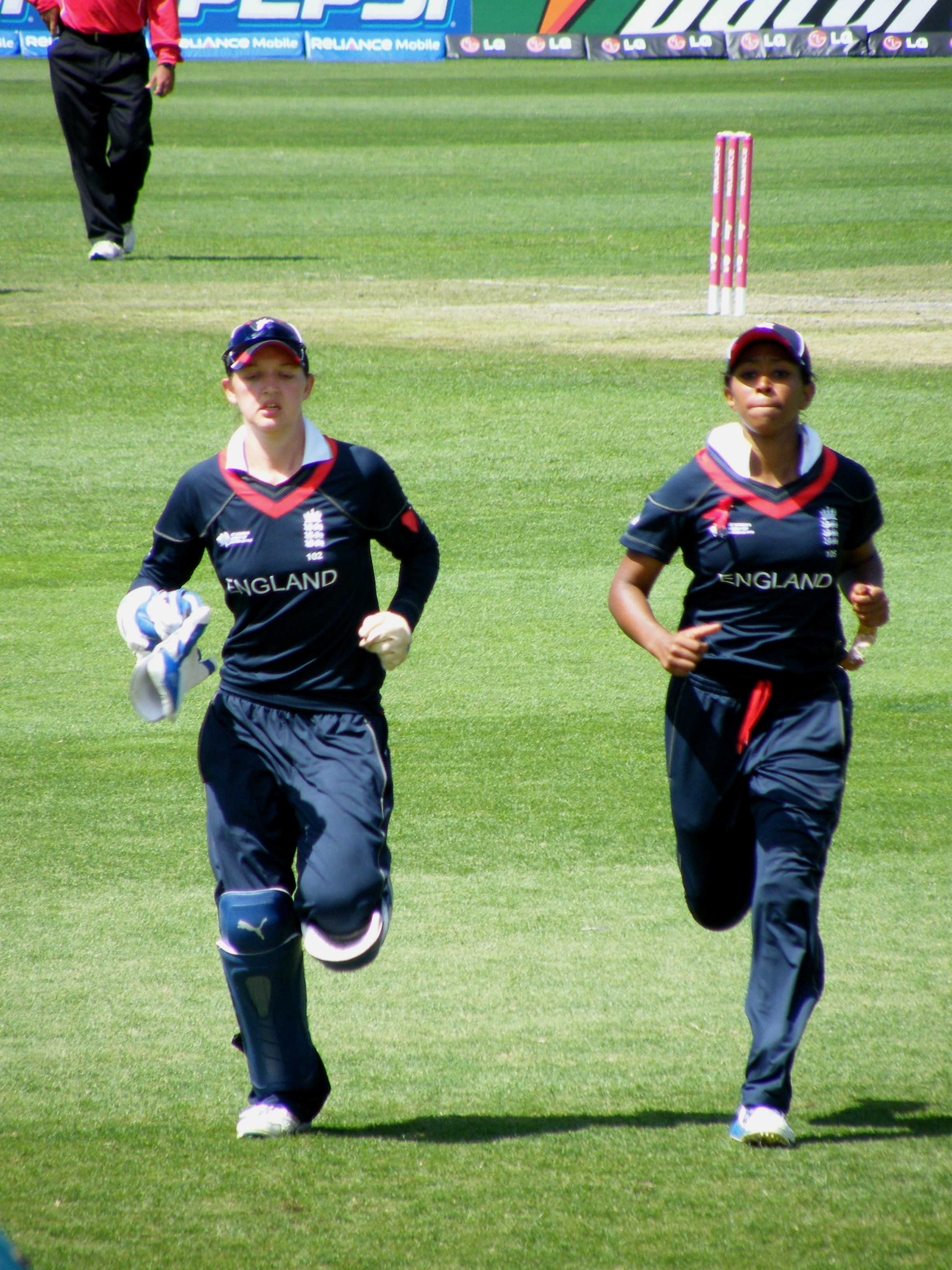
Sarah Taylor (left) & Ebony Rainford-Brent of England in March 2009 at the ICC Women's Cricket World Cup held in Sydney

She opened the batting for England in their victories in the 50 over World Cup in Australia and the World T20 in 2009. However, she pulled out of the England tours of 2010 and 2011, including the Ashes match in Australia.

She won the ICC Women's T20I Cricketer of the Year award in 2012 and 2013, and was the holder of one of the first tranche of 18 ECB central contracts for women players, which were announced in April 2014.

She was named as the ICC Women's ODI Cricketer of the Year in 2014.

In 2015, she became the first woman to be inducted in the Legends Lane at the County Cricket Ground in Hove.

Also in 2015 she became the first woman to play men's grade cricket in Australia, when she appeared as wicketkeeper for Northern Districts against Port Adelaide at Salisbury Oval in South Australia's premier men's competition.

In May 2016, Taylor announced she had been suffering from anxiety which she said had been adversely affecting her cricket performance. She announced a break from playing to 'prolong her career'. She resumed playing in April 2017 and in June she was selected for the 2017 Women's Cricket World Cup. In the tournament, she and Tammy Beaumont set the record for the highest 2nd-wicket partnership in Women's Cricket World Cup history (275) in a 68-run victory over South Africa. Taylor's innings of 147 was her career best in ODIs. Taylor was a member of the winning women's team at the 2017 Women's Cricket World Cup held in England.

In December 2017, she was named as one of the players in the ICC Women's ODI Team of the Year. In February 2019, she was awarded a full central contract by the England and Wales Cricket Board (ECB) for 2019. In June 2019, the ECB named her in England's squad for their opening match against Australia to contest the Women's Ashes.

In July 2019, ahead of the Women's Twenty20 International matches of the Women's Ashes, Taylor withdrew herself from England's squad, to take time away from the game, due to mental health issues. In September 2019, Taylor retired from international cricket due to her health issues.

== Coaching career and playing comeback ==
In an interview with ESPNcricinfo in January 2021, Taylor hinted at the prospect of coming out of retirement. She said that "I've got my cricket bag at school, ready to have a net," but also "[wasn't] saying yes, [wasn't] saying no."

On 15 March 2021, Taylor made history as the first female specialist coach for a senior English men's county team after her appointment as wicketkeeping coach for Sussex. In April 2021, Taylor's return to playing was announced, as she was signed by Welsh Fire for the 2021 season of The Hundred. She also appeared for Sussex in the 2021 Women's Twenty20 Cup, and played for Northern Diamonds as an injury replacement player. In October 2021 Taylor was appointed as assistant coach at Team Abu Dhabi, working with Paul Farbrace and Lance Klusener.

In February 2022 it was announced that she had been appointed as assistant coach at Manchester Originals for the upcoming season of The Hundred, working with both the men's and the women's sides, and had not yet ruled out returning to playing.

Taylor was appointed as the England Lions wicket-keeping coach for their tour of South Africa in November 2024. In May 2026 it was announced that she had been appointed as the fielding coach for the full England men's team for the Test series against New Zealand. Taylor continued working with the team during the Pakistan Test series that followed and was credited for helping Jamie Smith improve and use the tactic of standing up to the stumps against seam bowling.

== Awards ==
- ICC Women's T20I Cricketer of the Year – 2012, 2013
- ICC Women's ODI Cricketer of the Year – 2014

In November 2020, Taylor was nominated for the Rachael Heyhoe Flint Award for ICC Female Cricketer of the Decade.
