= Anya Shrubsole =

England cricketer

Anya Shrubsole MBE
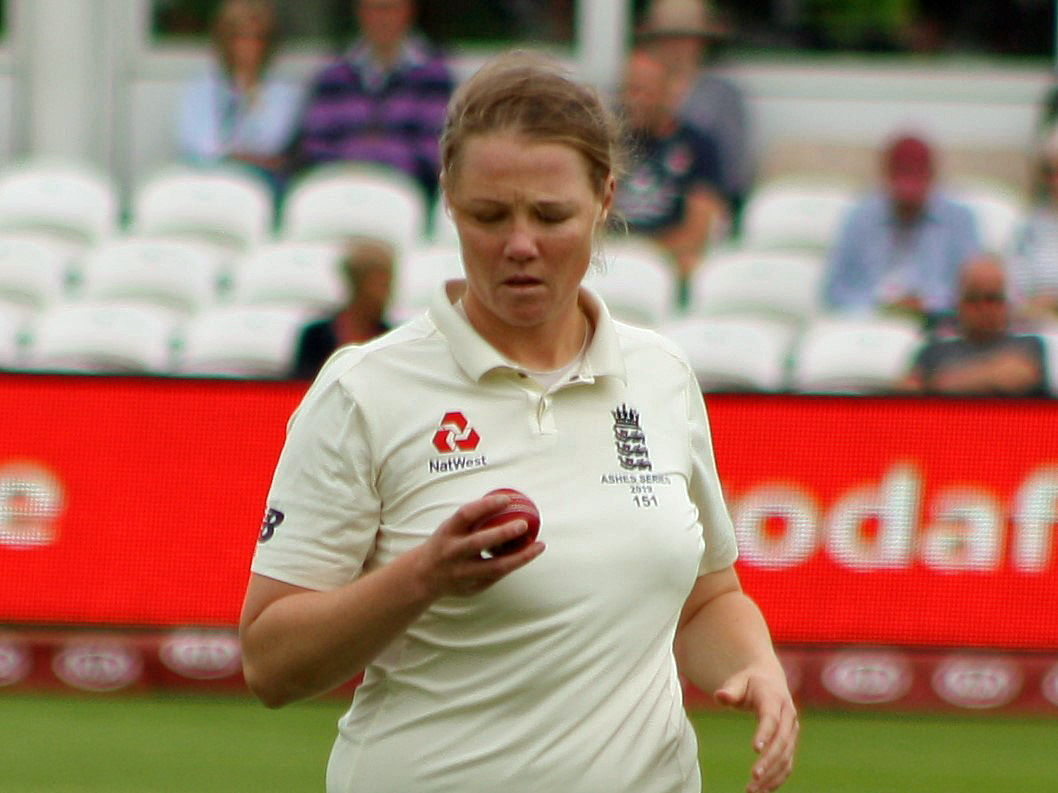

Personal information
- Born: 7 December 1991 (age 34); Bath, Somerset, England
- Nickname: Hoof
- Batting: Right-handed
- Bowling: Right-arm medium
- Role: Bowler

International information
- National side: England (2008–2022)
- Test debut (cap 151): 11 October 2013 v Australia
- Last Test: 27 January 2022 v Australia
- ODI debut (cap 112): 14 August 2008 v South Africa
- Last ODI: 3 April 2022 v Australia
- ODI shirt no.: 41
- T20I debut (cap 22): 23 August 2008 v South Africa
- Last T20I: 28 September 2020 v West Indies

Domestic team information
- Years: Team
- 2004–2018: Somerset
- 2016–2021: Western Storm
- 2016/17: Perth Scorchers
- 2019: Berkshire
- 2021–2023: Southern Brave
- 2022–2023: Southern Vipers

Career statistics
Competition	WTest	WODI	WT20I	WLA
Matches	8	86	79	189
Runs scored	118	285	104	2,175
Batting average	9.83	10.55	11.55	20.91
100s/50s	0/0	0/0	0/0	1/7
Top score	47	32*	29	105
Balls bowled	1,556	4,002	1,598	7,819
Wickets	19	106	102	217
Bowling average	33.42	26.53	15.55	21.85
5 wickets in innings	0	2	1	5
10 wickets in match	0	0	0	0
Best bowling	4/51	6/46	5/11	7/28
Catches/stumpings	4/–	23/–	20/–	57/–
- Source: CricketArchive, 6 October 2022

Anya Shrubsole MBE (born 7 December 1991) is an English former cricketer who played as a right-arm medium pace bowler and right-handed lower-order batter. She played for England between 2008 and 2022, and played domestic cricket for Somerset, Berkshire, Western Storm, Southern Vipers, Southern Brave and Perth Scorchers. She made her England debut in 2008, and was Player of the Match in the 2017 Women's Cricket World Cup Final. In 2018, she became the first woman to appear on the cover of Wisden Cricketers' Almanack. In April 2022, Shrubsole announced her retirement from international cricket. In June 2023, she announced her intention to retire from all forms of cricket after the 2023 season of The Hundred.

== Early life ==
Anya Shrubsole was born in Bath, Somerset and attended St Stephen's Primary School and later Hayesfield Girls' School. She is the daughter of Ian Shrubsole, who made two Minor Counties appearances for Wiltshire in the early 1990s. Her sister Lauren played county cricket for Somerset Women between 2010 and 2016.

== County and franchise career ==
Although she played youth cricket for Somerset, appearing in both the Under-15 and Under-17 Women's County Championships, Shrubsole made her first-team debut for the county at the age of 12. Facing Berkshire in the Women's County Championship, Shrubsole claimed two wickets in her six overs after opening the bowling alongside Steph Davies, helping Somerset to a four-wicket victory. She scored her first runs in women's List A cricket in the following match, remaining ten not out against Staffordshire. Though she only played three of Somerset's five fixtures in the 2004 competition, Shrubsole finished with the county's second-best bowling average, her five wickets in the competition coming at an average of 11.20.

In 2005 Shrubsole made her first appearance in the Super Fours – a competition in which the England selectors place the 48 leading players into four teams – playing one Twenty20 for the Braves. Shrubsole remained 16 not out at the close of the Braves innings, and claimed two wickets in the following innings as the V Team won by four wickets. Her performances in the County Championship brought her fewer wickets than in the previous season, the young bowler claiming two in the competition. In contrast, she improved significantly on her highest batting total, posting a score of 41 not out during a big victory over Surrey in July. The following season saw Shrubsole begin the season playing as a specialist batter. She did not bowl until her sixth match (Note: Only counting matches in the County Championship and Super Fours, not club matches.) of the season. She continued to bowl infrequently through the season and, despite playing all six County Championship matches for Somerset, only bowled 131 balls, 133 fewer than fellow medium-pace bowler Hannah Lloyd. Her batting during the season saw her finish as Somerset's second-highest run-scorer with 127 runs. Her performances in the Super Fours were less impressive: in three 50-over and two 20-over contests, she scored seven runs and did not claim a wicket. After the close of the English women's domestic season, Shrubsole appeared for the MCC's women's side against the touring Indians in a Twenty20.

In 2021, she was drafted by Southern Brave for the inaugural season of The Hundred. In April 2022, it was announced that Shrubsole had signed for Southern Vipers in a player-coach role. She played six matches for the Vipers in 2022, all in the Charlotte Edwards Cup, taking four wickets.

== International career ==
Shrubsole's first match of the 2007 season brought her best career bowling return in women's List A cricket. With Somerset defending 206, she opened the bowling for her county, claiming seven wickets – including those of Surrey's top six batters. After her strong start to the season, Shrubsole only managed one more wicket in the Championship, in Somerset's second match, against Berkshire. Her eight wickets were still enough for her to finish second among Somerset wicket-takers in 2007. The Rubies won all six matches in the Super Fours, during which Shrubsole claimed two wickets, though her bowling was expensive: her Economy of 4.21 was the worst on the team. Despite this, Shrubsole opened the bowling for an ECB Women's Invitation XI in a Twenty20 match against England.

Shrubsole played two matches for the England Development Squad against the touring South Africans in early August 2007, claiming a wicket in each match to help the English side win them both. She then travelled with the Development Squad to compete in the 2007 Women's European Championship, playing all three of England's matches as they remained undefeated to win the tournament.

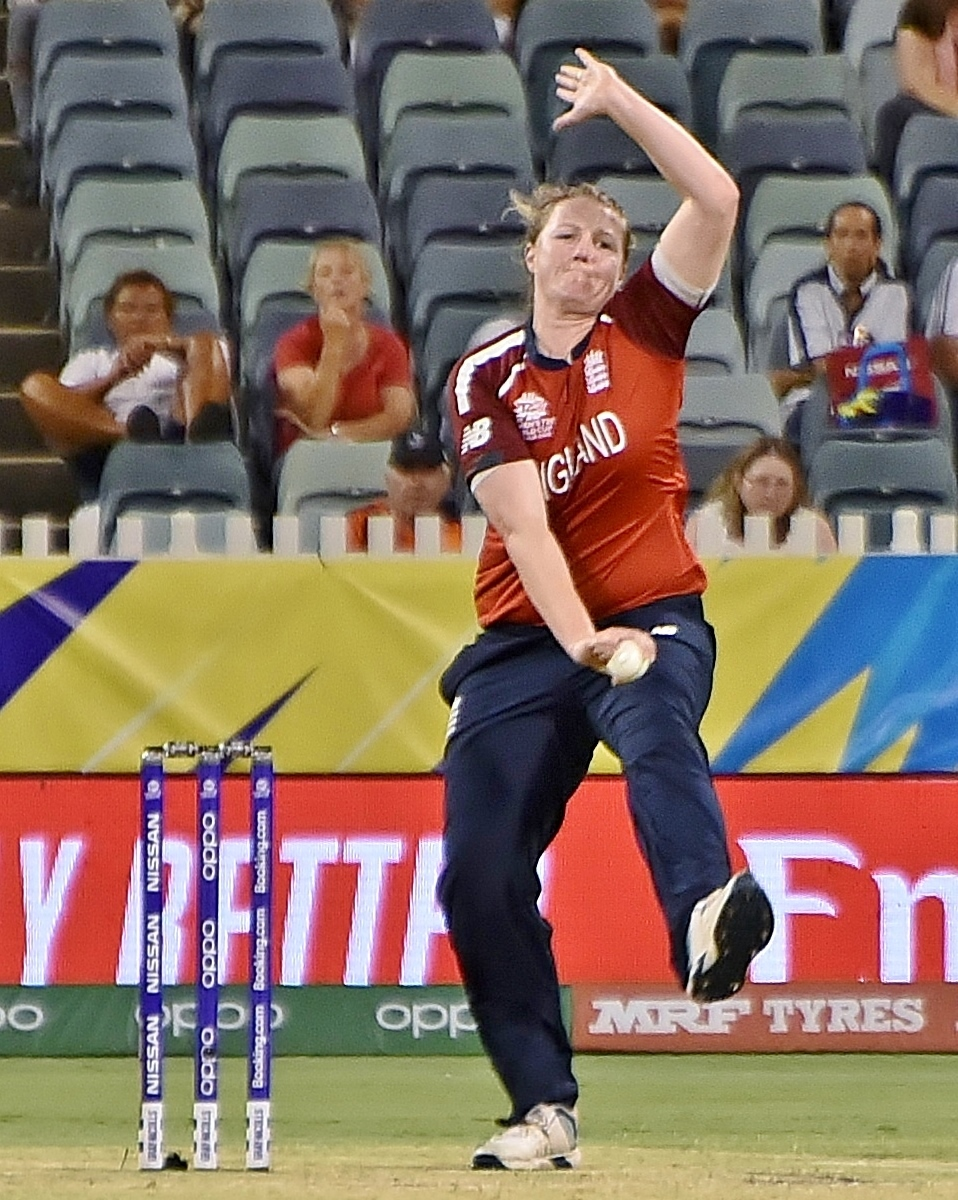
Shrubsole bowling for England during the 2020 ICC Women's T20 World Cup

Shrubsole made her ODI debut against South Africa on 14 August 2008. Opening the bowling, she took the wicket of Marcia Letsoalo as England recorded a comfortable victory. Nine days later, Shrubsole took three wickets on her Twenty20 International debut against South Africa, and was subsequently named player of the match.

She won the Most Promising Young Women's Cricketer Award at the end of the 2008 season, and was called up to England's squad for the 2009 Women's Cricket World Cup. She took a career-best 5 for 11 in the first T20 international against New Zealand in February 2012.

She is the holder of one of the first tranche of 18 ECB central contracts for women players, which were announced in April 2014.

Shrubsole was a member of the winning women's team at the 2017 World Cup held in England, and was voted player of the game in the final at Lord's with a match-winning 6/46. These are also the best bowling figures in a Women's Cricket World Cup final. Her contribution to England's success was recognised by the award of an MBE in the Queen's 2018 New Year Honours list. In April 2018 she was named one of the five Wisden Cricketers of the Year for her part in the 2017 World Cup victory.

In October 2018, she was named in England's squad for the 2018 ICC Women's World Twenty20 tournament in the West Indies. In February 2019, she was awarded a full central contract by the England and Wales Cricket Board (ECB) for 2019. In June 2019, the ECB named her in England's squad for their opening match against Australia to contest the Women's Ashes. In January 2020, she was named in England's squad for the 2020 ICC Women's T20 World Cup in Australia. In England's match against Pakistan, Shrubsole took her 100th wicket in WT20I cricket.

On 18 June 2020, Shrubsole was named in a squad of 24 players to begin training ahead of international women's fixtures starting in England following the COVID-19 pandemic.

In November 2020, Shrubsole was nominated for the ICC Women's T20I Cricketer of the Decade award. In June 2021, Shrubsole was named as in England's Test squad for their one-off match against India. In December 2021, Shrubsole was named in England's squad for their tour to Australia to contest the Women's Ashes. In February 2022, she was named in England's team for the 2022 Women's Cricket World Cup in New Zealand. A month after the conclusion of the World Cup, Shrubsole announced her retirement from international cricket.

== Personal life ==
Shrubsole's nickname is "Hoof". After England's World Cup semi-final victory against South Africa in 2017, her teammate Jenny Gunn explained to ESPNcricinfo that "We call her 'Hoof' because she sometimes walks like a show pony with her feet ..."

== Honours ==
=== Team ===
- Women's Cricket World Cup champion: 2017

=== Individual ===
- Member of the British Empire: 2018
- ICC Spirit of Cricket Award: 2017
- One of the five Wisden Cricketers of the Year: 2018
- Honorary Doctorate of the University, awarded by the University of Bath: December 2018

== Notes ==
Sporting positions
Preceded by Moira Comfort	Somerset women's cricket captain 2012–2016	Succeeded by Sophie Luff
