= Katherine Sciver-Brunt =

England cricketer (born 1985)

Katherine Sciver-Brunt OBE
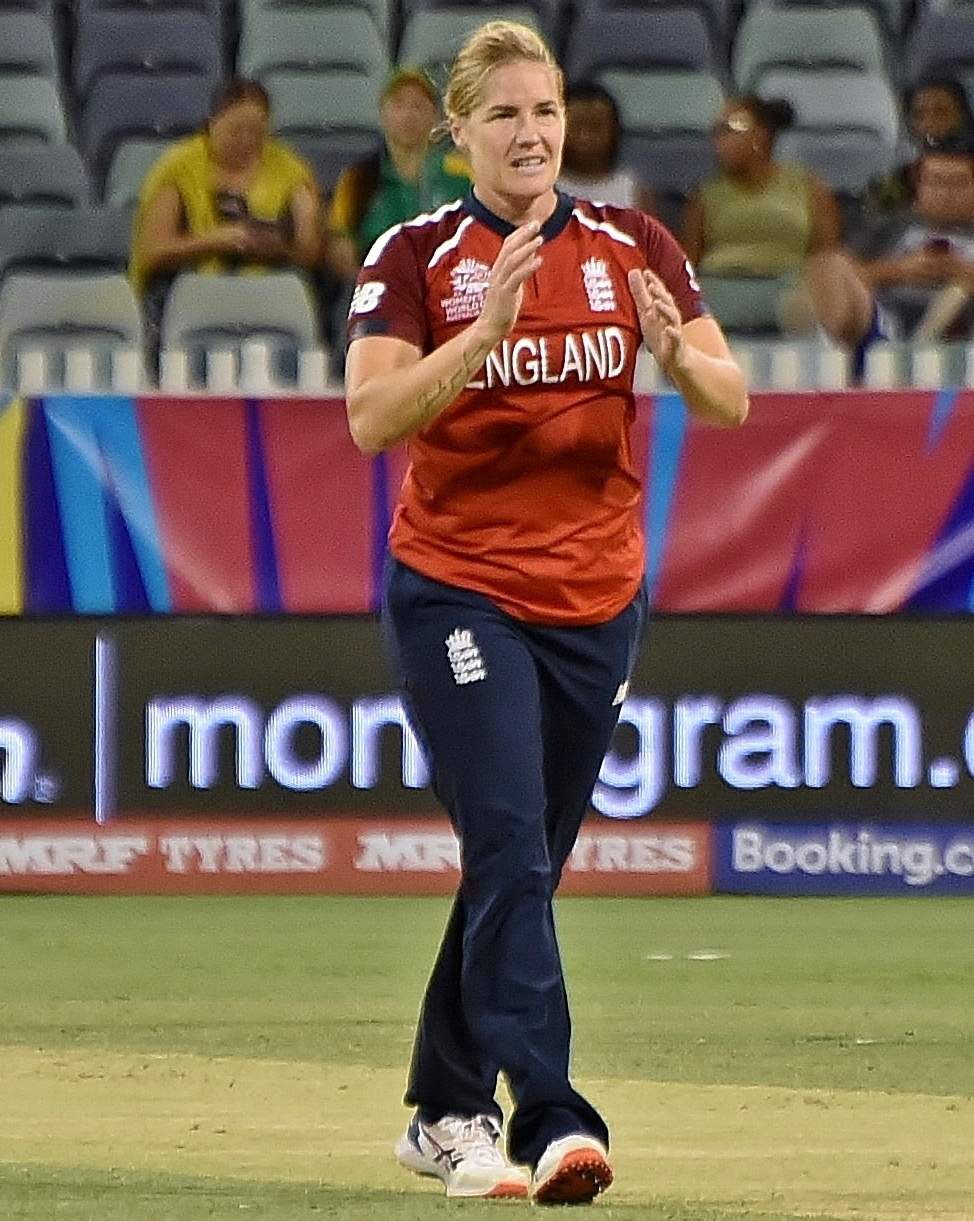
- Brunt playing for England during the 2020 ICC Women's T20 World Cup

Personal information
- Full name: Katherine Helen Sciver-Brunt
- Born: 2 July 1985 (age 41); Barnsley, South Yorkshire, England
- Nickname: Brunty, Nunny
- Batting: Right-handed
- Bowling: Right-arm medium-fast
- Role: Bowling all-rounder
- Relatives: Nat Sciver-Brunt (spouse)

International information
- National side: England (2004–2023)
- Test debut (cap 141): 21 August 2004 v New Zealand
- Last Test: 27 January 2022 v Australia
- ODI debut (cap 104): 13 March 2005 v South Africa
- Last ODI: 11 July 2022 v South Africa
- ODI shirt no.: 26
- T20I debut (cap 13): 2 September 2005 v Australia
- Last T20I: 24 February 2023 v South Africa

Domestic team information
- Years: Team
- 2004–2019: Yorkshire
- 2015/16–2017/18: Perth Scorchers (squad no. 26)
- 2016–2019: Yorkshire Diamonds
- 2020–2022: Northern Diamonds
- 2020/21: Melbourne Stars (squad no. 26)
- 2021–2023: Trent Rockets

Career statistics
Competition	WTest	WODI	WT20I	WLA
Matches	14	141	112	243
Runs scored	184	1,090	590	2,780
Batting average	13.14	18.16	15.94	23.36
100s/50s	0/1	0/2	0/0	0/11
Top score	52	72*	42*	93
Balls bowled	2,611	6,841	2,353	11,275
Wickets	51	170	114	289
Bowling average	21.52	23.96	19.19	21.73
5 wickets in innings	3	5	0	8
10 wickets in match	0	0	0	0
Best bowling	6/69	5/18	4/15	6/29
Catches/stumpings	5/–	39/–	35/–	69/–
- Source: CricketArchive, 26 August 2023

Katherine Helen Sciver-Brunt OBE (née Brunt; born 2 July 1985) is an English former cricketer who played as a right-arm fast bowler and right-handed lower-order batter. She played for England between 2004 and 2023, appearing in 14 Test matches, 141 One Day Internationals and 112 Twenty20 Internationals. She won two World Cups and one T20 World Cup, and was named England women's Cricketer of the Year four times. She played domestic cricket for Yorkshire, Yorkshire Diamonds, Northern Diamonds, Trent Rockets, Perth Scorchers and Melbourne Stars.

In June 2022, she announced her retirement from playing Test cricket. In May 2023, she announced her retirement from all international cricket, before retiring from all cricket in August 2023.

== Career ==
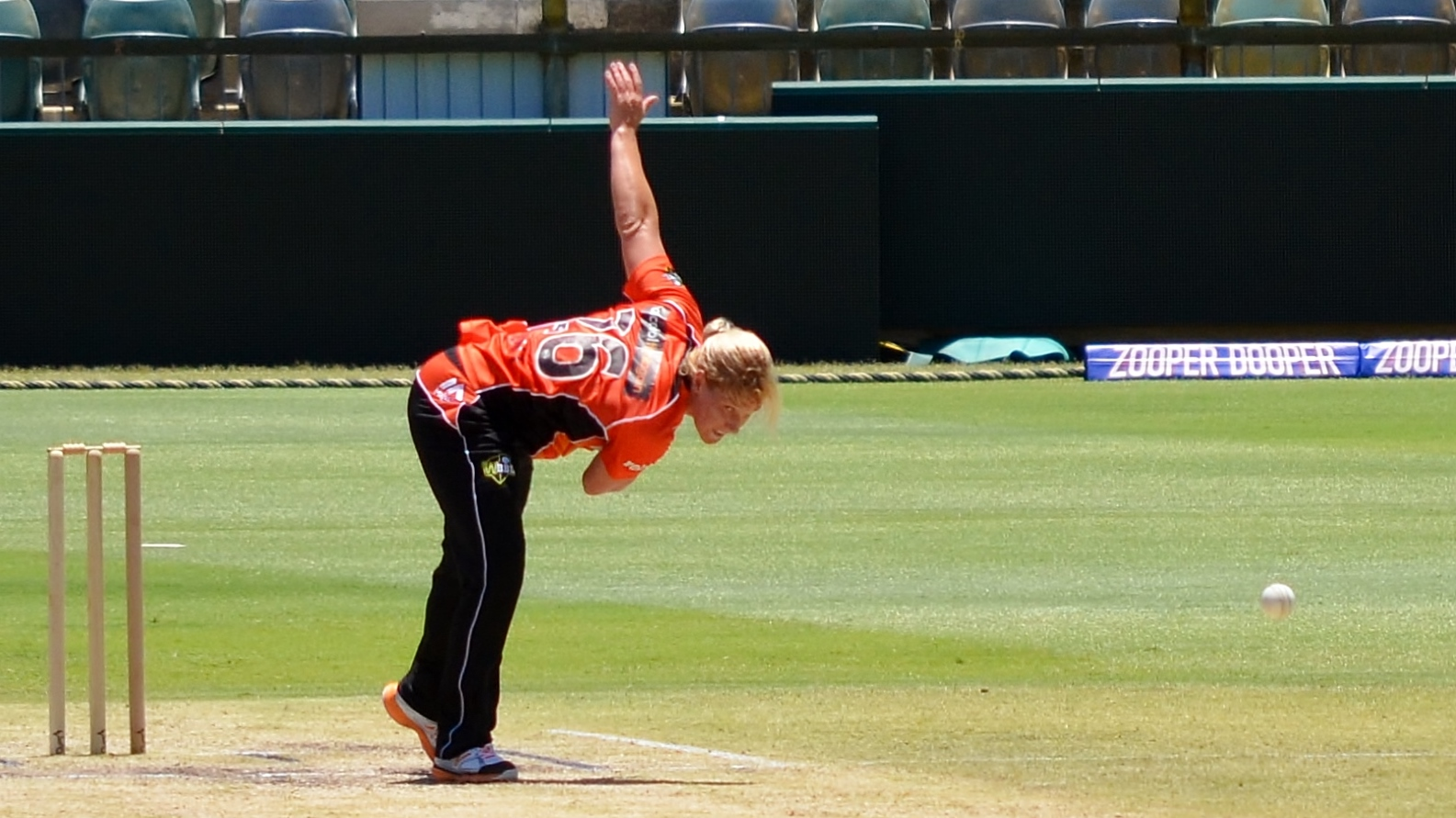
Brunt bowling for Perth Scorchers, 2015

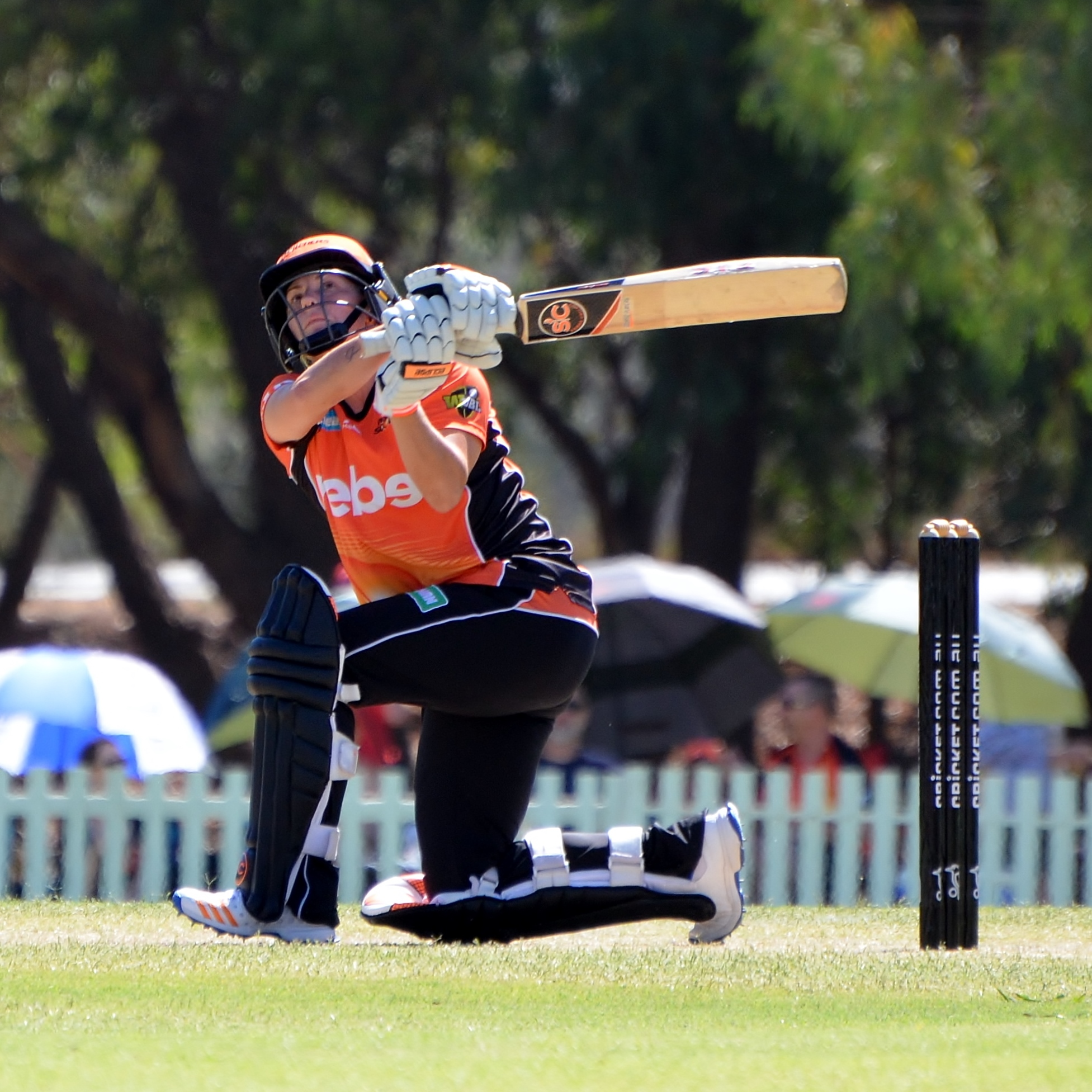
Brunt batting for Perth Scorchers, 2017

An aggressive right arm fast bowler with a classical action, she played for Yorkshire age group sides before taking a break from cricket at the age of 17 due to fitness concerns. She went to Penistone Grammar School, Barnsley, South Yorkshire. She returned for the Test against New Zealand in 2004 and was a member of the 2005 England World Cup side in South Africa. She took 14 wickets and scored her maiden half century as England won the Ashes in 2005 and opened the bowling in England's successful 2009 World Cup Campaign.

She was Player of the Match in the 2009 Twenty20 World championship final at Lords, taking 3 wickets for 6 runs in her 4 over opening spell and took a career best 6 for 69 in the one off Ashes Test which followed. Her best figures in one day internationals came in the final of the 2011 NatWest Women's Quadrangular Series where her 5 for 18 bowled England to victory over Australia.

She is the holder of one of the first tranche of 18 ECB central contracts for women players, which were announced in April 2014.

Brunt was a member of the winning women's team at the 2017 Women's Cricket World Cup held in England.

In October 2018, she was named in England's squad for the 2018 ICC Women's World Twenty20 tournament in the West Indies. However, she was ruled out of the tournament due to a back injury and was replaced by Fran Wilson.

In February 2019, she was awarded a full central contract by the England and Wales Cricket Board (ECB) for 2019. In June 2019, the ECB named her in England's squad for their opening match against Australia to contest the Women's Ashes.

In December 2019, in the opening match of England's series against Pakistan in Malaysia, Brunt took her 150th wicket in WODI matches. In January 2020, she was named in England's squad for the 2020 ICC Women's T20 World Cup in Australia.

On 18 June 2020, Brunt was named in a squad of 24 players to begin training ahead of international women's fixtures starting in England following the COVID-19 pandemic. In June 2021, Brunt was named as in England's Test squad for their one-off match against India. In December 2021, Brunt was named in England's squad for their tour to Australia to contest the Women's Ashes. In February 2022, she was named in England's team for the 2022 Women's Cricket World Cup in New Zealand.

In April 2022, she was bought by the Trent Rockets for the 2022 season of The Hundred. In July 2022, she was named in England's team for the cricket tournament at the 2022 Commonwealth Games in Birmingham, England. Later the same month, during England's home series against South Africa, Brunt took her 100th wicket in WT20I cricket. On 30 July 2022, in England's first fixture of the Commonwealth Games, against Sri Lanka, Brunt played in her 100th WT20I match. In January 2023, Brunt announced her retirement from county and regional cricket. In May 2023, Sciver-Brunt announced her retirement from all international cricket.

== Personal life ==
Brunt's nicknames are "Brunty" and "Nunny". In 2015, she explained to sports journalist Clare Balding that she is known as Nunny because she had set off a fire alarm during a residential cricket course at the Benedictine-run Ampleforth College.

In October 2019, Brunt announced her engagement to fellow England cricketer Nat Sciver. They were scheduled to get married in September 2020, but their wedding was postponed due to the COVID-19 pandemic. The couple eventually married in May 2022. Both changed their last name to Sciver-Brunt when they married, and in January 2023 it was announced that the pair would both go by the name in all cricket-related instances.

On 20 September 2024, the couple announced Katherine was pregnant with their first child.

== Honours ==
=== Team ===
- Women's Cricket World Cup champion: 2009, 2017
- ICC Women's T20 World Cup champion: 2009

=== Individual ===
- ECB Cricketer of the Year – 2006, 2010, 2012–13
- ICC Spirit of Cricket Award - 2014
