= Jodie Fields =

Australian cricketer and coach (born 1984)

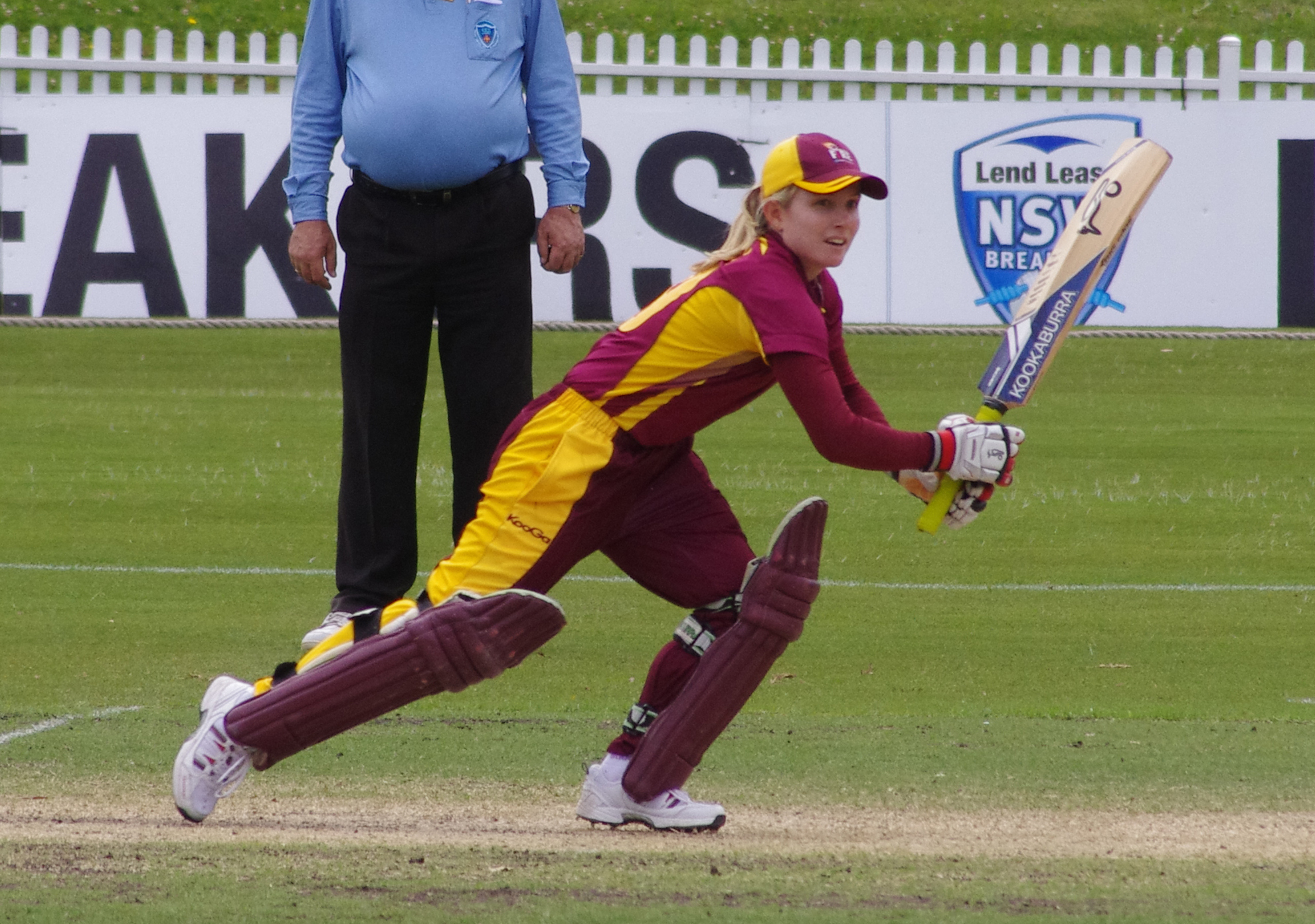
- Fields batting for Queensland

Personal information
- Full name: Jodie Maree Fields
- Born: 19 June 1984 (age 42); Toowoomba, Queensland
- Nickname: Jacko
- Batting: Right-handed
- Bowling: Right-arm medium
- Role: Wicket-keeper

International information
- National side: Australia
- Test debut (cap 150): 18 February 2006 v England
- Last Test: 10 January 2014 v England
- ODI debut (cap 105): 25 February 2006 v India
- Last ODI: 25 August 2013 v England
- T20I debut (cap 16): 18 October 2006 v New Zealand
- Last T20I: 31 August 2013 v England

Domestic team information
- Years: Team
- 2001/02–2014/15: Queensland
- 2011: Middlesex
- 2015/16: Brisbane Heat
- 2016/17: ACT Meteors

Career statistics
Competition	Test	ODI	T20I	LA
Matches	4	67	37	181
Runs scored	331	1162	249	3,938
Batting average	66.20	28.34	22.63	31.75
100s/50s	1/1	0/5	0/0	2/19
Top score	139	64*	37*	150
Catches/stumpings	11/0	57/19	25/15	144/42
- Source: Cricinfo, 7 August 2025

Jodie Maree Fields (née Purves, born 19 June 1984) is a sports administrator, coach, women's sport and physical activity advocate, and former Australian cricket player.

Fields grew up in Queensland playing boy's and men's cricket before playing women's cricket while at University. She made her debut for the Queensland Fire in 2000 and captained the team from the 2008–09 season for six years. During her career, she played 165 domestic limited overs matches and 98 Women's National Cricket League matches.

Fields made her international debut for Australia in a Test against India in Adelaide in February 2006. She was appointed Captain of the Australian Women's Cricket Team in 2009, replacing the renowned Karen Rolton. In doing so, she became the first Queensland woman to captain the Australian team. Fields first game as captain of the Australian national women's side was a T201 against England in Derby on 25 July 2009.

In Fields first Test match as captain against England in July 2009, she made her maiden Test century with a captain's knock of 139, rescuing her team from the perilous position of 5-28. The match was eventually drawn after rain on the last day.

Fields captained the Australian Women's Cricket Team to the ICC Women's World Twenty20 title in 2012 in Sri Lanka and defied the odds to defeat the favourites, England in the final. Fields led the side to another victory in the ICC Women's World Cup in India less than six months later in February 2013. Fields retired from International cricket on 12 June 2014.

Fields retired as one of the most successful Australian cricket captains, having led her side to the 2012 ICC Women's World Twenty20 and the 2013 ICC Women's World Cup and bowed out with the team holding the number one world rankings in One Day International (ODI) and T20 cricket. During her international career, she played in four Tests, 67 ODIs and 37 Women's T20 International matches. Fields made a name for herself with both the bat and gloves throughout her career. She amassed a total of 331 Test runs, 1162 ODI runs and 249 T20 runs. Her wicketkeeping statistics are equally impressive, having claimed 11 dismissals in Tests, 76 dismissals (57 catches, 19 stumpings) in ODIs and 40 dismissals (25 catches and 15 stumpings) in T20s.

Fields was arguably one of Queensland's greatest female players. To date she has notched up 98 WNCL matches and 47 WT20 matches with the Konica Minolta Queensland Fire and enjoyed individual success at domestic level. She won the Player-of-the-Year award on three occasions for Queensland and amassed 2327 WNCL runs and 829 WT20 runs. Fields captained the Queensland side to their first ever WT20 title in the 2013–14 season, although she missed the final due to injury.

Fields was the 150th woman to play Test cricket for Australia, and the 105th woman to play One Day International cricket for Australia.

In 2014, Fields launched a personal scholarship scheme, "The Jodie Fields Young Cricketer Development Scholarship" in partnership with UQ Business School, Kookaburra Sport, and QLD Cricket Association. The scholarship assists promising young female cricketers around Queensland with their sport development and professional career prospects. The scholarship has been awarded to four aspiring young girls since 2014, by assisting them with new cricket gear, financial assistance and a significant head start in their careers. Each annual Scholarship recipient is selected from a group of promising players that attend the Queensland Cricket Emerging Girls talent identification camp or are part of the Queensland Cricket Youth Pathway programs, and/or are rural based residents with a determination to succeed in cricket. The scholarship was originally designed and sponsored by Jodie with significant contributions from, Talbot and Purves Pty Ltd, Hollis Family Trust, Howzat Sports and Queensland Cricket Association. In 2015–16, Jodie partnered with University of Queensland Business School for a five-year $2,500 annual scholarship agreement. In addition to this sponsorship, Kookaburra Sport and the Queensland Cricket Association have been tremendous supporters of the initiative with equipment and mentorship opportunities. The scholarship provides significant financial assistance to families, a cricket gear sponsorship and access to Brisbane Heat and Queensland Fire training, games and mentorship from elite female players.

In 2017, Fields was an integral part behind the renewed memorandum of understanding (MOU) for Australian cricketers, secured under an in-principle agreement between Cricket Australia and the Australian Cricketers' Association, to include men and women in the same agreement for the first time. The goal for this revenue share model was to bring the female players into the same model to allow their part of the game to grow. Fields has been a standout voice for this change, "the deal recognises the contribution women make to sport in this country, both on the field and off the field. The agreement will provide a secure workplace for female cricketers both at international and domestic level. It will support female cricketers as the game moves progressively towards complete professionalisation in a sustained manner. In recent years, women’s cricket has grown both locally, domestically in Australia and globally."

Fields's nickname is "Jacko"; she has said that that is because she runs like a Jack Russell Terrier.
