= Ireland women's cricket team in England in 2010 =

| | Ireland | England |
- Dates: 5 July – 7 July
| Captains | Heather Whelan | Charlotte Edwards |

One Day International series
- Results: England won the 1-match series 1–0
| Most runs | Laura Delany (43) | Charlotte Edwards (72) |
| Most wickets | Isobel Joyce (2); Jill Whelan (2) | Holly Colvin (2) |

The Ireland women's cricket team toured England in July 2010. They played England in one One Day International, which was won by England. They also played against New Zealand in one ODI, as part of New Zealand's tour of England, which was won by New Zealand.

== Squads ==
| England | Ireland |
|---|---|
| Charlotte Edwards (c); Katherine Brunt; Holly Colvin; Lydia Greenway; Jenny Gunn; Danielle Hazell; Heather Knight; Laura Marsh; Beth Morgan; Nicky Shaw; Anya Shrubsole; Claire Taylor; Sarah Taylor (wk); Danni Wyatt | Heather Whelan (c); Laura Delany; Kim Garth; Cecelia Joyce; Isobel Joyce; Suzanne Kenealy; Sinead Lyons; Louise McCarthy; Ciara Metcalfe; Melissa Scott-Hayward; Clare Shillington; Mary Waldron (wk); Jill Whelan |

== Only ODI: Ireland v New Zealand ==
4 July 2010
Scorecard

| New Zealand; 296/8 (50 overs) | v | Ireland; 137 (44.4 overs) |
| Liz Perry 70 (69); Ciara Metcalfe 3/54 (9 overs) | | Jill Whelan 36 (81); Lucy Doolan 3/7 (5 overs) |

New Zealand Women won by 159 runs
Kibworth Cricket Club New Ground, Kibworth
Umpires: Ian Armitage (Eng) and George Wood (Eng)

- Ireland Women won the toss and elected to field.
- Laura Delany, Kim Garth, Mary Waldron (Ire) and Liz Perry (NZ) made their WODI debuts.

== Tour match: Marylebone Cricket Club v Ireland ==
5 July 2010
Scorecard

| Ireland; 270/7 (50 overs) | v | Marylebone Cricket Club; 271/8 (48.4 overs) |
| Clare Shillington 88 (78); Alice Macleod 3/51 (10 overs) | | Amanda Potgieter 108 (118); Isobel Joyce 3/64 (10 overs) |

Marylebone Cricket Club Women won by 2 wickets
Kibworth Cricket Club New Ground, Kibworth
Umpires: Christopher Jones (Eng) and Stephen Jones (Eng)

- Marylebone Cricket Club Women won the toss and elected to field.

== Only ODI: England v Ireland ==
7 July 2010
Scorecard

| England; 274/7 (50 overs) | v | Ireland; 127 (49.2 overs) |
| Charlotte Edwards 72 (101); Isobel Joyce 2/45 (10 overs) | | Laura Delany 43 (90); Holly Colvin 2/31 (10 overs) |

England Women won by 147 runs
Kibworth Cricket Club New Ground, Kibworth
Umpires: Russell Evans (Eng) and Keith Parsons (Eng)

- England Women won the toss and elected to bat.
- Louise McCarthy (Ire) made her WODI debut.
