= Ireland women's cricket team in England in 2012 =

| | England | Ireland |
- Dates: 22 June – 24 June 2012
| Captains | Charlotte Edwards | Isobel Joyce |

Twenty20 International series
- Results: England won the 1-match series 1–0
| Most runs | Charlotte Edwards (72) | Clare Shillington (29) |
| Most wickets | Danni Wyatt (2) | 4 bowlers (1) |

The Ireland women's cricket team toured England in June 2012. They played England in 1 Twenty20 International, which was won by England, and played India in 1 One Day International, which was won by India. The series preceded India's tour of England.

== Squads ==
| England | Ireland |
|---|---|
| Charlotte Edwards (c); Tammy Beaumont; Arran Brindle; Katherine Brunt; Holly Colvin; Georgia Elwiss; Lydia Greenway; Jenny Gunn; Danielle Hazell; Heather Knight; Laura Marsh; Susie Rowe; Sarah Taylor (wk); Danni Wyatt | Isobel Joyce (c); Laura Cullen; Laura Delany; Emma Flanagan; Kim Garth; Cecelia Joyce; Shauna Kavanagh; Louise McCarthy; Rebecca Rolfe; Melissa Scott-Hayward; Clare Shillington; Elena Tice; Mary Waldron (wk) |

== Tour Match: England Academy v Ireland ==
22 June 2012
Scorecard

| England Academy | v | Ireland |

Match Abandoned
Haslegrave Ground, Loughborough
Umpires: Ben Debenham (Eng) and Nigel Llong (Eng)

- No toss.
- No play possible due to rain.

== Only T20I ==
23 June 2012
Scorecard

| England; 136/4 (20 overs) | v | Ireland; 85/5 (20 overs) |
| Charlotte Edwards 72* (61); Laura Cullen 1/10 (2 overs) | | Clare Shillington 29 (38); Danni Wyatt 2/12 (3 overs) |

England Women won by 51 runs
Haslegrave Ground, Loughborough
Umpires: Ben Debenham (Eng) and Nigel Llong (Eng)
Player of the match: Charlotte Edwards (Eng)

- Ireland Women won the toss and elected to field.

== Only ODI: Ireland v India ==
24 June 2012
Scorecard

| Ireland; 107/6 (20 overs) | v | India; 109/1 (16.4 overs) |
| Cecelia Joyce 35 (45); Archana Das 2/17 (4 overs) | | Punam Raut 51* (50); Louise McCarthy 1/29 (3.4 overs) |

India Women won by 9 wickets
Haslegrave Ground, Loughborough
Umpires: Ben Debenham (Eng) and Nigel Llong (Eng)

- India Women won the toss and elected to field.
- Match reduced to 20 overs per side due to rain.
- Mona Meshram (Ind) made her WODI debut.

== See also ==
- Indian women's cricket team in England in 2012
