= England women's cricket team in the West Indies in 2009–10 =

English cricket team in West Indies in 2009
	West Indies	England
- Dates: 5 – 12 November 2009
Captains	Merissa Aguilleira	Charlotte Edwards

One Day International series
- Results: West Indies won the 3-match series 2–1
Most runs	Pamela Lavine (106)	Lydia Greenway (102)
Most wickets	Pamela Lavine (6)	Holly Colvin (7)

Twenty20 International series
- Results: West Indies won the 3-match series 2–1
Most runs	Pamela Lavine (124)	Charlotte Edwards (104)
Most wickets	Stafanie Taylor (5)	Katherine Brunt (5)
- Player of the series: Pamela Lavine (West Indies)

The English women's cricket team toured the West Indies in 2009, playing a total of three women's One Day Internationals and three women's Twenty20 Internationals in the space of eight days.

== Touring party ==
England's touring party was announced in September 2009, with first-choice wicket-keeper Sarah Taylor rested and batsman Claire Taylor choosing to miss the tour with work commitments. The Kent wicket-keeper Tammy Beaumont was called up to the national squad for the first time.

Full touring party:

- Charlotte Edwards (captain)
- Caroline Atkins
- Tammy Beaumont (wicket-keeper)
- Katherine Brunt
- Holly Colvin
- Lydia Greenway
- Isa Guha
- Jenny Gunn
- Danielle Hazell
- Laura Marsh
- Beth Morgan
- Ebony-Jewel Rainford-Brent
- Nicki Shaw
- Anya Shrubsole

== One Day International series ==
4 November 2009

West Indies; 235/6 (50 overs)	v	England; 195 (47.4 overs)
Cordel Jack 81 (116); Holly Colvin 2/47 [10]		Charlotte Edwards 58 (85); Chedean Nation 3/22 [5]

West Indies women won by 40 runs
Warner Park Stadium, Basseterre, St Kitts and Nevis
Umpires: Luther Kelly and Vernon Weekes
Player of the match: Cordel Jack

5 November 2009

England; 232/5 (50 overs)	v	West Indies; 219 (47.5 overs)
Ebony-Jewel Rainford-Brent 72 (116); Stafanie Taylor 3/29 [10]		Pamela Lavine 57 (91); Charlotte Edwards 2/17 [2.5]

England women won by 13 runs
Warner Park Stadium, Basseterre, St Kitts and Nevis
Umpires: Luther Kelly and Vernon Weekes
Player of the match: Ebony-Jewel Rainford-Brent

7 November 2009

England; 176/9 (50 overs)	v	West Indies; 179/9 (46.3 overs)
Lydia Greenway 61 (84); Pamela Lavine 3/29 [10]		Stafanie Taylor 43 (76); Holly Colvin 4/24 [10]

West Indies women won by 1 wicket
Warner Park Stadium, Basseterre, St Kitts and Nevis
Umpires: Luther Kelly and Wycliffe Mitchum
Player of the match: Stacy-Ann King

== Twenty20 International series ==
9 November 2009

England; 112/8 (20 overs)	v	West Indies; 115/6 (19.5 overs)
Charlotte Edwards 34 (34); Stafanie Taylor 3/16 [4]		Cordel Jack 39 (39); Isa Guha 3/21 [4]

West Indies women won by 4 wickets
Warner Park Stadium, Basseterre, St Kitts and Nevis
Umpires: Luther Kelly and Wycliffe Mitchum
Player of the match: Stafanie Taylor

10 November 2009

England; 99 (19.4 overs)	v	West Indies; 102/5 (19.1 overs)
Charlotte Edwards 41 (44); Pamela Lavine 4/21 [4]		Pamela Lavine 37 (40); Katherine Brunt 2/21 [4]

West Indies women won by 5 wickets
Warner Park Stadium, Basseterre, St Kitts and Nevis
Umpires: Wycliffe Mitchum and Vernon Weekes
Player of the match: Pamela Lavine

12 November 2009

West Indies; 119/6 (20 overs)	v	England; 120/4 (18.1 overs)
Pamela Lavine 61 (49); Katherine Brunt 2/27 [4]		Jenny Gunn 35 (26); Tremayne Smartt 1/16 [2]

England women won by 6 wickets
Warner Park Stadium, Basseterre, St Kitts and Nevis
Umpires: Luther Kelly and Vernon Weekes
Player of the match: Pamela Lavine
