= 2012 Women's World Twenty20 =

3rd edition of the Women's T20 World Cup

- Dates: 26 September – 7 October 2012
- Administrator: International Cricket Council
- Cricket format: Women's Twenty20 International
- Tournament format(s): Group stage and Knockout
- Host: Sri Lanka
- Champions: Australia (2nd title)
- Runners-up: England
- Participants: 8
- Matches: 15
- Player of the series: (England) Charlotte Edwards
- Most runs: (England) Charlotte Edwards (172)
- Most wickets: (Australia) Julie Hunter (11)
- Official website: iccworldtwenty20.com

The 2012 Women's World Twenty20 was the third Women's T20 World Cup competition, held in Sri Lanka from 26 September to 7 October 2012. The group stage matches were played at the Galle International Stadium in Galle and semi-finals and final were played at R. Premadasa Stadium in Colombo. The competition was held simultaneously with the equivalent men's tournament, the 2012 World Twenty20.

The eventual victors were the 2010 champions Australia, who beat pre-tournament favourites England by four runs in the final, a match which came down to the final ball. England captain Charlotte Edwards blamed this defeat on a "lack of discipline" in her side, whilst Test Match Special analyst Ebony Rainford-Brent cited underachieving bowlers and England's inability to rotate the strike.

With a total of 172 runs at an average of 43.00, Edwards was named Player of the Tournament.

== Format ==
Following warm-up matches, the eight teams were divided into two groups where matches were played in a round-robin format. The two best placed teams from each group progressed to the two-round knock-out stage, whilst the eliminated teams played each other for qualification for the 2014 tournament.

Group A	Group B
England	Sri Lanka
Australia	New Zealand
India	West Indies
Pakistan	South Africa

== Venues ==
All matches were played at the following two grounds in Galle and Colombo:

Galle	Colombo	2012 Women's World Twenty20 is located in Sri Lanka
Galle International Stadium	R. Premadasa Stadium	2012 Women's World Twenty20 is located in Sri Lanka
Capacity: 35,000	Capacity: 35,000	2012 Women's World Twenty20 is located in Sri Lanka

== Fixtures and results ==
All times given are Sri Lanka Standard Time (UTC+05:30)

=== Warm-up matches ===
4 warm-up matches were played on 23 and 24 September featuring all 8 teams.

Warm-up matches

22 September
09:30
Scorecard

Sri Lanka; 77/8 (20 overs)	v	Pakistan; 78/6 (17.2 overs)
Shashikala Siriwardene 38 (52); Asmavia Iqbal 4/11 (4 overs)		Sana Mir 18 (24); Inoka Ranaweera 2/12 (3 overs)

Pakistan Women won by 4 wickets
Nondescripts Cricket Club, Colombo
Umpires: Asoka de Silva and Ruchira Palliyaguru

- Pakistan Women won the toss and elected to field.

22 September
09:30
Scorecard

England; 180/4 (20 overs)	v	South Africa; 59 (18.4 overs)
Charlotte Edwards 54 (38); Dinesha Devnarain 1/13 (2 overs)		Shandre Fritz 33 (38); Danielle Hazell 2/5 (3 overs)

England Women won by 121 runs
Moors Sports Club Ground, Colombo
Umpires: Asoka de Silva and Tyron Wijewardene

- England Women won the toss and elected to bat.

23 September
09:30
Scorecard

Australia; 110/8 (20 overs)	v	West Indies; 91 (17.1 overs)
Jess Cameron 37 (28); Subrina Munroe 2/17 (2 overs)		Merissa Aguilleira 22 (31); Ellyse Perry 3/22 (3 overs)

Australia Women won by 19 runs
Moors Sports Club Ground, Colombo
Umpires: Asoka de Silva and Ranmore Martinesz

- Australia Women won the toss and elected to bat.

23 September
09:30
Scorecard

India; 100 (19.4 overs)	v	New Zealand; 101/6 (18.1 overs)
Amita Sharma 32 (39); Frances Mackay 3/13 (3 overs)		Suzie Bates 51 (39); Ekta Bisht 3/6 (3 overs)

New Zealand Women won by 4 wickets
Nondescripts Cricket Club, Colombo
Umpires: Tyron Wijewardene and Ruchira Palliyaguru

- India Women won the toss and elected to bat.

=== Group stage ===
==== Group A ====
Pos	Team	Pld	W	L	NR	Pts	NRR
1	England	3	3	0	0	6	1.341
2	Australia	3	2	1	0	4	0.628
3	Pakistan	3	1	2	0	2	−1.367
4	India	3	0	3	0	0	−0.607

Source: ESPNCricinfo

27 September
09:30
Scorecard

England; 133/6 (20 overs)	v	Pakistan; 90 (19.4 overs)
Laura Marsh 54 (41); Sana Mir 2/20 (4 overs)		Javeria Khan 23 (20); Holly Colvin 4/9 (3.4 overs)

England Women won by 43 runs
Galle International Stadium, Galle
Umpires: Tony Hill (NZ) and Bruce Oxenford (Aus)
Player of the match: Laura Marsh (Eng)

- Pakistan Women won the toss and elected to field.
- Sumaiya Siddiqi (Pak) made her WT20I debut.

27 September
13:30
Scorecard

India; 104/8 (20 overs)	v	Australia; 105/2 (17.2 overs)
Poonam Raut 21 (21); Erin Osborne 3/13 (3 overs)		Meg Lanning 39 (50); Jhulan Goswami 1/21 (4 overs)

Australia Women won by 8 wickets
Galle International Stadium, Galle
Umpires: Billy Bowden (NZ) and Marais Erasmus (SA)
Player of the match: Erin Osborne (Aus)

- India Women won the toss and elected to bat.

29 September
09:30
Scorecard

Australia; 146/5 (20 overs)	v	Pakistan; 38/3 (9 overs)
Jess Cameron 42 (28); Sadia Yousuf 2/39 (4 overs)		Qanita Jalil 13 (11); Ellyse Perry 2/19 (4 overs)

Australia Women won by 25 runs (D/L)
Galle International Stadium, Galle
Umpires: Billy Bowden (NZ) and Nigel Llong (Eng)
Player of the match: Jess Cameron (Aus)

- Australia Women won the toss and elected to bat.
- Pakistan's innings was reduced to 9 overs due to rain, the revised target was 64.

29 September
13:30
Scorecard

India; 116/6 (20 overs)	v	England; 118/1 (17.1 overs)
Poonam Raut 51 (57); Laura Marsh 2/22 (4 overs)		Charlotte Edwards 50* (53); Reema Malhotra 1/23 (3 overs)

England Women won by 9 wickets
Galle International Stadium, Galle
Umpires: Tony Hill (NZ) and Bruce Oxenford (Aus)
Player of the match: Charlotte Edwards (Eng)

- India Women won the toss and elected to bat.
- Anuja Patil (Ind) made her WT20I debut.
- England Women and Australia Women qualified for the semi-finals as a result of this match.

1 October
09:30
Scorecard

Pakistan; 98/9 (20 overs)	v	India; 97/8 (20 overs)
Sana Mir 26 (38); Rasanara Parwin 2/15 (4 overs)		Jhulan Goswami 21 (24); Nida Dar 3/12 (4 overs)

Pakistan Women won by 1 run
Galle International Stadium, Galle
Umpires: Billy Bowden (NZ) and Nigel Llong (Eng)
Player of the match: Nida Dar (Pak)

- Pakistan Women won the toss and elected to bat.
- Rasanara Parwin (Ind) made her WT20I debut.

1 October
13:30
Scorecard

Australia; 144/5 (20 overs)	v	England; 146/3 (18.1 overs)
Meg Lanning 39 (31); Anya Shrubsole 2/32 (4 overs)		Sarah Taylor 65* (53); Julie Hunter 1/17 (3 overs)

England Women won by 7 wickets
Galle International Stadium, Galle
Umpires: Marais Erasmus (SA) and Tony Hill (NZ)
Player of the match: Sarah Taylor (Eng)

- Australia Women won the toss and elected to bat.

==== Group B ====
Pos	Team	Pld	W	L	NR	Pts	NRR
1	West Indies	3	2	1	0	4	1.602
2	New Zealand	3	2	1	0	4	0.638
3	Sri Lanka	3	1	2	0	2	−0.692
4	South Africa	3	1	2	0	2	−1.194

Source: ESPNCricinfo

26 September
09:30
Scorecard

Sri Lanka; 79 (20 overs)	v	South Africa; 80/4 (17.2 overs)
Dilani Manodara 24 (35); Susan Benade 2/7 (4 overs)		Trisha Chetty 33 (40); Inoka Ranaweera 2/15 (4 overs)

South Africa Women won by 6 wickets
Galle International Stadium, Galle
Umpires: Billy Bowden (NZ) and Tony Hill (NZ)
Player of the match: Trisha Chetty (SA)

- South Africa Women won the toss and elected to field.
- Match start delayed due to a wet outfield.
- Inoka Ranaweera (SL) made her WT20I debut.

26 September
13:30
Scorecard

New Zealand; 117/9 (20 overs)	v	West Indies; 118/3 (18 overs)
Suzie Bates 32 (34); Anisa Mohammed 2/17 (4 overs)		Deandra Dottin 58* (42); Erin Bermingham 2/18 (4 overs)

West Indies Women won by 7 wickets
Galle International Stadium, Galle
Umpires: Nigel Llong (Eng) and Bruce Oxenford (Aus)
Player of the match: Deandra Dottin (WI)

- West Indies Women won the toss and elected to field.

28 September
09:30
Scorecard

New Zealand; 151/5 (20 overs)	v	South Africa; 129/9 (20 overs)
Sophie Devine 59 (46); Susan Benade 2/15 (4 overs)		Dane van Niekerk 34* (28); Nicola Browne 3/13 (4 overs)

New Zealand Women won by 22 runs
Galle International Stadium, Galle
Umpires: Nigel Llong (Eng) and Bruce Oxenford (Aus)
Player of the match: Sophie Devine (NZ)

- South Africa Women won the toss and elected to field.

28 September
13:30
Scorecard

Sri Lanka; 50/3 (10.3 overs)	v	West Indies; 42/8 (8 overs)
Shashikala Siriwardene 18* (18); Stafanie Taylor 1/4 (2 overs)		Stacy-Ann King 12 (7); Chamani Seneviratna 2/4 (4 overs)

Sri Lanka Women won by 5 runs (D/L)
Galle International Stadium, Galle
Umpires: Billy Bowden (NZ) and Tony Hill (NZ)
Player of the match: Shashikala Siriwardene (SL)

- West Indies Women won the toss and elected to field.
- Sri Lanka Women's innings curtailed after 10.3 overs due to rain.
- West Indies Women's innings reduced to 8 overs due to rain, the revised target was 48.

30 September
09:30
Scorecard

South Africa; 70/8 (20 overs)	v	West Indies; 71/0 (9.4 overs)
Dane van Niekerk 29 (45); Stafanie Taylor 3/10 (4 overs)		Stafanie Taylor 33 (30)

West Indies Women won by 10 wickets
Galle International Stadium, Galle
Umpires: Tony Hill (NZ) and Nigel Llong (Eng)
Player of the match: Stafanie Taylor (WI)

- West Indies Women won the toss and elected to field.
- West Indies Women qualified for the semi-finals and South Africa Women were eliminated as a result of this match.

30 September
13:30
Scorecard

Sri Lanka; 89 (17.4 overs)	v	New Zealand; 90/2 (15.4 overs)
Shashikala Siriwardene 14 (13); Morna Nielsen 2/10 (4 overs)		Amy Satterthwaite 32* (36); Chamani Seneviratna 1/27 (4 overs)

New Zealand Women won by 8 wickets
Galle International Stadium, Galle
Umpires: Marais Erasmus (SA) and Bruce Oxenford (Aus)
Player of the match: Sara McGlashan (NZ)

- Sri Lanka Women won the toss and elected to bat.
- New Zealand Women qualified for the semi-finals and Sri Lanka Women were eliminated as a result of this match.

=== Knockout stage ===
Semifinals
A1	England	94/3 (17.2 overs)
B2	New Zealand	93/8 (20 overs)
B1	West Indies	87 (19.2 overs)
A2	Australia	115/7 (20 overs)

Final
A1	England	138/9 (20 overs)
A2	Australia	142/4 (20 overs)

==== Play-offs ====
3 October
09:30
Scorecard

Pakistan; 87/8 (20 overs)	v	South Africa; 88/5 (19.5 overs)
Bismah Maroof 32 (40); Shabnim Ismail 3/18 (4 overs)		Alison Hodgkinson 25 (39); Sadia Yousuf 2/10 (4 overs)

South Africa Women won by 5 wickets
Moors Sports Club Ground, Colombo
Umpires: Tony Hill (NZ) and Nigel Llong (Eng)
Player of the match: Shabnim Ismail (SA)

- Pakistan Women won the toss and elected to bat.
- Javeria Rauf (Pak) made her WT20I debut.
- South Africa Women qualified for the 2014 ICC Women's World Twenty20.

3 October
09:30
Scorecard

Sri Lanka; 100/8 (20 overs)	v	India; 102/1 (14.4 overs)
Chamari Atapattu 28 (37); Ekta Bisht 3/16 (4 overs)		Poonam Raut 45* (38); Inoka Ranaweera 1/21 (3 overs)

India Women won by 9 wickets
Nondescripts Cricket Club, Colombo
Umpires: Billy Bowden (NZ) and Marais Erasmus (SA)
Player of the match: Ekta Bisht (Ind)

- Sri Lanka Women won the toss and elected to bat.
- India Women qualified for the 2014 ICC Women's World Twenty20.

==== Semi-finals ====
4 October
14:30
Scorecard

New Zealand; 93/8 (20 overs)	v	England; 94/3 (17.2 overs)
Amy Satterthwaite 30 (39); Holly Colvin 2/15 (4 overs)		Charlotte Edwards 33 (37); Sian Ruck 2/22 (4 overs)

England Women won by 7 wickets
R. Premadasa Stadium, Colombo
Umpires: Marais Erasmus (SA) and Bruce Oxenford (Aus)
Player of the match: Charlotte Edwards (Eng)

- England Women won the toss and elected to field.

5 October
14:30
Scorecard

Australia; 115/7 (20 overs)	v	West Indies; 87 (19.2 overs)
Lisa Sthalekar 23 (25); Shanel Daley 2/23 (4 overs)		Juliana Nero 31 (45); Julie Hunter 5/22 (3.2 overs)

Australia Women won by 28 runs
R. Premadasa Stadium, Colombo
Umpires: Billy Bowden (NZ) and Tony Hill (NZ)
Player of the match: Ellyse Perry (Aus)

- Australia Women won the toss and elected to bat.

==== Final ====
7 October
14:30
Scorecard

Australia; 142/4 (20 overs)	v	England; 138/9 (20 overs)
Jess Cameron 45 (34); Holly Colvin 2/21 (4 overs)		Charlotte Edwards 28 (23); Jess Jonassen 3/25 (4 overs)

Australia Women won by 4 runs
R. Premadasa Stadium, Colombo
Attendance: 9,321
Umpires: Billy Bowden (NZ) and Marais Erasmus (SA)
Player of the match: Jess Cameron (Aus)

- England Women won the toss and elected to field.

== Statistics ==
Source: ESPNCricinfo

Highest Individual Scores

(England) Sarah Taylor	65* (53)
(New Zealand) Sophie Devine	59 (46)
(Cricket West Indies) Deandra Dottin	58* (42)
(England) Laura Marsh	54 (41)
(India) Poonam Raut	51 (57)

Most Runs

(England) Charlotte Edwards	172
(Australia) Jess Cameron	151
(Australia) Meg Lanning	138
(England) Sarah Taylor	138
(India) Poonam Raut	135

Most Sixes

(Australia) Jess Cameron	6
(New Zealand) Sophie Devine	4
(England) Laura Marsh	3
(South Africa) Susan Benade	2
(Cricket West Indies) Deandra Dottin	2

Most Fifties

(Cricket West Indies) Deandra Dottin	1
(New Zealand) Sophie Devine	1
(India) Poonam Raut	1
(England) Charlotte Edwards	1
(England) Laura Marsh	1
(England) Sarah Taylor	1

Best Bowling in an Innings

(Australia) Julie Hunter	5/22 (3.2 overs)
(England) Holly Colvin	4/9 (3.4 overs)
(Cricket West Indies) Stafanie Taylor	3/10 (4 overs)
(Pakistan) Nida Dar	3/12 (4 overs)
(Australia) Erin Osborne	3/13 (3 overs)

Most Wickets

(Australia) Julie Hunter	11
(England) Holly Colvin	9
(New Zealand) Erin Bermingham	7
(Cricket West Indies) Stafanie Taylor	6
(Australia) Ellyse Perry	6

== See also ==
- 2012 ICC World Twenty20
