= Charlotte Edwards =

English cricketer (born 1979)

Charlotte Edwards CBE
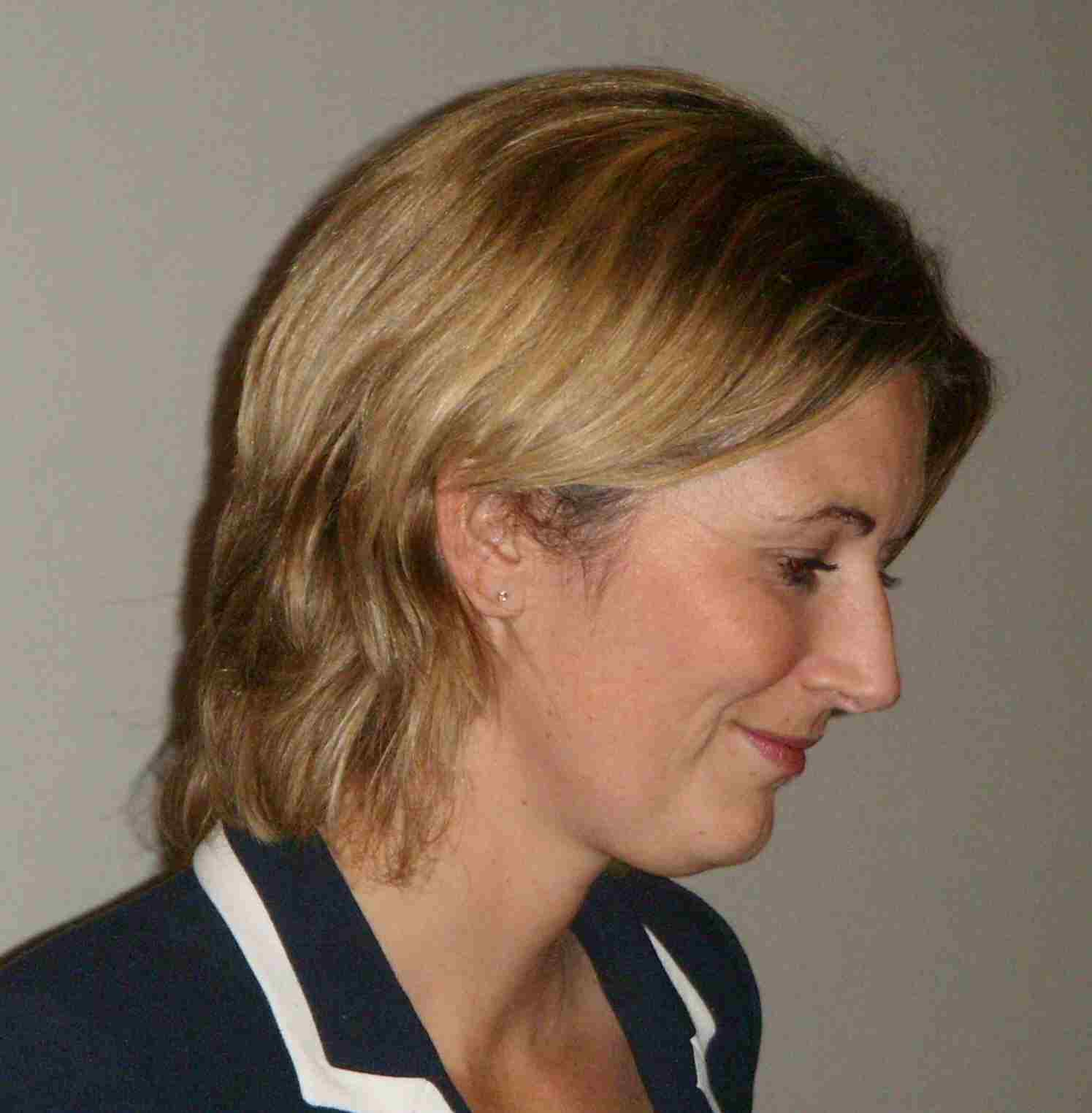
- Edwards in 2009

Personal information
- Full name: Charlotte Marie Edwards
- Born: 17 December 1979 (age 46); Huntingdon, England
- Batting: Right-handed
- Bowling: Right-arm leg break
- Role: Batter

International information
- National side: England (1996–2016)
- Test debut (cap 123): 12 July 1996 v New Zealand
- Last Test: 11 August 2015 v Australia
- ODI debut (cap 73): 15 August 1997 v South Africa
- Last ODI: 14 February 2016 v South Africa
- ODI shirt no.: 23
- T20I debut (cap 3): 5 August 2004 v New Zealand
- Last T20I: 30 March 2016 v Australia

Domestic team information
- Years: Team
- 1994–1999: East Anglia
- 2000–2016: Kent
- 2000/01: Northern Districts
- 2002/03: Northern Districts
- 2014/15: Western Australia
- 2015/16: Perth Scorchers
- 2016–2017: Southern Vipers
- 2016/17: South Australia
- 2016/17: Adelaide Strikers
- 2017–2018: Hampshire

Career statistics
Competition	WTest	WODI	WT20I	WLA
Matches	23	191	95	407
Runs scored	1,676	5,992	2,605	16,644
Batting average	44.10	38.16	32.97	51.85
100s/50s	4/9	9/46	0/12	42/104
Top score	117	173*	92*	199*
Balls bowled	1,118	1,627	303	7,593
Wickets	12	54	9	204
Bowling average	48.08	21.74	36.66	23.10
5 wickets in innings	0	0	0	1
10 wickets in match	0	0	0	0
Best bowling	2/28	4/30	3/21	5/31
Catches/stumpings	10/–	52/–	16/–	133/–
- Source: CricketArchive, 14 March 2021

Charlotte Marie Edwards CBE (born 17 December 1979) is an English former cricketer and current cricket coach and commentator. She played primarily as a right-handed batter. She appeared in 23 Test matches, 191 One Day Internationals and 95 Twenty20 Internationals for England between 1996 and 2016. She played domestic cricket in England for East Anglia, Kent, Hampshire and Southern Vipers, as well as overseas for Northern Districts, Western Australia, Perth Scorchers, South Australia and Adelaide Strikers.

Edwards is considered one of the most significant figures in women's cricket. At the time of her international debut in 1996, in a Test match against New Zealand, she was the youngest woman to play for England. In 1997, the day before her 18th birthday, she scored what remains the highest score for an English player in a Women's One Day International (WODI), scoring 173* against Ireland. She has the second most appearances in Women's Test matches, and the most appearances for England in WODIs. She is also England's second-leading run-scorer in Women's Test matches, and all-time leading run-scorer in both WODIs and Women's Twenty20 Internationals (WT20Is). She was named ICC Women's Cricketer of the Year in 2008, and PCA Women's Player of the Year and a Wisden Cricketer of the Year in 2014. She was awarded an MBE in 2009 and a CBE in 2014. In 2022, she was inducted into the ICC Cricket Hall of Fame.

Edwards first captained England in 2005, and was appointed as captain of the national side permanently in 2006, following the retirement of Clare Connor. England went on to win the 2009 Women's Cricket World Cup, the 2009 ICC Women's World Twenty20 and three outright Ashes series under her leadership. She remained captain of the side until the side's exit from the 2016 ICC Women's World Twenty20, after which she was told she was not part of the side's future plans: she subsequently retired from international cricket. She continued playing domestic cricket for Hampshire and Southern Vipers before announcing her retirement from all cricket in September 2017, playing her final match in June 2018 for Hampshire.

Following her playing career, she became Director of Women's Cricket at Hampshire in 2018. She became head coach of her former team Southern Vipers in 2020, and led them to the first two Rachael Heyhoe Flint Trophy titles. She also coaches Southern Brave in The Hundred, Sydney Sixers in the Women's Big Bash League and Mumbai Indians in the Women's Premier League. In 2021, the new English domestic women's Twenty20 competition, the Charlotte Edwards Cup, was named after her in recognition of her contribution to English cricket, with Southern Vipers first winning the trophy named after their coach in 2022. She also regularly appears as a commentator on cricket for Sky Sports, and was appointed president of the Professional Cricketers' Association in 2021.

== Early life ==
Edwards was born on 17 December 1979 in Huntingdon, Cambridgeshire, and grew up on a farm near Pidley. Her father, Clive Edwards, played for Huntingdonshire County Cricket Club (as did her uncle Hugh and later her brother Daniel). She played her first club cricket at Ramsey Cricket Club in Huntingdonshire, and later captained one of the youth sides. She attended Ramsey Abbey School, a comprehensive school.

== Domestic career ==
=== County cricket ===
Edwards played her first county cricket match in 1994, for East Anglia against East Midlands in the Women's Area Championship, in which she took 2/34 from 11 overs and scored 25 runs. She was the side's leading run-scorer that season, with 186 runs including 77* made against Surrey Second XI. Edwards played for East Anglia until the end of the 1999 season, including in the first three seasons of the Women's County Championship, which was instituted in 1997. She made her maiden List A century in 1996, scoring 113 against East Midlands. She was the leading run-scorer in the 1998 Women's County Championship, with 394 runs including three centuries.

Edwards joined Kent ahead of the 2000 season. She captained the side once in her first season, before becoming the regular captain of the side in 2002 until she departed the club at the end of the 2016 season. During her time with Kent, the side would win the Women's County Championship in 2006, 2007, 2009, 2011, 2012, 2014 and 2016, and the Women's Twenty20 Cup (which began in 2009) in 2011, 2013 and 2016. She was the leading run-scorer in the Women's County Championship in 2000, 2002, 2004, 2011 and 2014. She was also the leading wicket-taker in the Women's County Championship in 2006, and the leading run-scorer in the Women's Twenty20 Cup in 2010. Her highest score in county cricket came in 2002, scoring 151* for Kent against Middlesex. She also scored 151, dismissed, against Sussex in 2014.

After winning the County Championship and Twenty20 Cup double with Kent in 2016, Edwards announced that she was leaving the club. A week later, it was announced that she was joining Hampshire, a side she would represent for two seasons, in 2017 and 2018 (including as captain in 2018). During her time with the club, they were promoted from Division 2 of the Women's County Championship in 2017 before winning Division 1 a season later, in 2018. Having retired from international cricket in 2016, Edwards announced her retirement from all cricket in September 2017. She played her final county cricket match, and final match in all cricket, on 17 June 2018 against Somerset in the Twenty20 Cup, where she did not bat or bowl.

=== Women's Cricket Super League ===
In 2016, Edwards was named as captain of Southern Vipers in the inaugural Women's Cricket Super League. The Vipers went on to win the competition, with Edwards batting four times in five appearances, with a top score of 30 against Western Storm. She captained the side again in 2017, her final season playing in the competition, with the Vipers once again reaching the final but this time losing to Western Storm.

=== Overseas cricket ===
Edwards played for Northern Districts in New Zealand's domestic 50-over competition in 2000–01 and 2002–03. She was the side's leading run-scorer in both seasons she played, as well as scoring a century in both seasons.

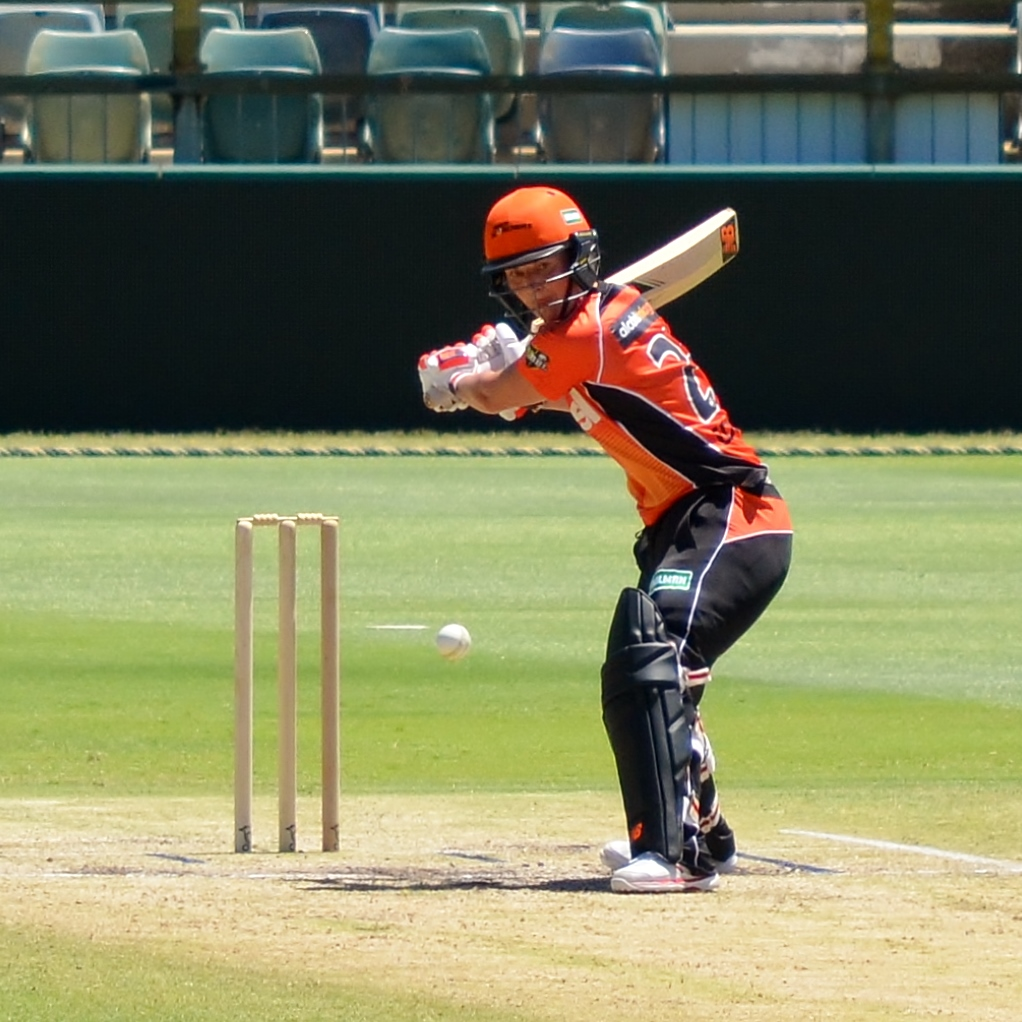
Edwards batting for Perth Scorchers, 2015.

In 2014–15, Edwards played for Western Australia in the Women's National Cricket League and the Australian Women's Twenty20 Cup. She was the side's leading run-scorer in both competitions. Edwards also captained the side, and at the end of the season was named the side's player of the year in both competitions, and awarded the Zoe Goss Medal, for being the outstanding female cricketer in Western Australia. The following season, she played in the inaugural season of the Women's Big Bash League for Perth Scorchers. She was her side's leading run-scorer, and the second-highest across the whole competition, with 462 runs including four half-centuries.

In 2016–17, Edwards played for South Australia in the Women's National Cricket League and their equivalent team Adelaide Strikers in the Women's Big Bash League. She was South Australia's leading run-scorer in the Women's National Cricket League, with 312 runs including two centuries. She scored 141 runs at an average of 20.14 in eight matches in the Women's Big Bash League.

=== Other cricket ===
Edwards also played in the Super Fours, for Diamonds between 2002 and 2012 and for Sapphires in 2013. In the opening match of the 2006 Super Fours, Edwards scored her List A high score, scoring 199* from 151 balls against Sapphires. She also took her only career five-wicket haul in the Super Fours, in 2005, taking 5/31 against V Team (the previous name of Sapphires).

== International career ==
=== Age-group international cricket ===
Edwards began playing for junior England sides in 1992, and played for the side at Under-20, Under-21 and Under-23 level. She played for Junior England against the Netherlands in a warm-up match for the 1993 Women's Cricket World Cup, and for England Under-21s at the 1997–98 Caltrate Inter-Provincial Tournament, South Africa's domestic 50-over tournament, which England Under-21s won.

=== Early years ===
Edwards made her international debut on 12 July 1996, for England against New Zealand in a Test match at Guildford. She scored 34 in the first innings and 31 in the second innings, opening the batting both times. At the time of her international debut, she was 16 years old, making her the youngest woman to have played for England at the time. The record was later broken when Holly Colvin made her debut aged 15 in 2005.

She next played for England against South Africa in 1997, making her Women's One Day International (WODI) debut in the first match of the series on 15 August. In the second match of the series, Edwards scored her maiden international century, scoring 102 from 118 deliveries at the County Ground, Taunton. At the time, she was the youngest player to score a WODI century, with the record subsequently being broken by Mithali Raj in 1997. She next played in the 1997 Women's Cricket World Cup in India and, in England's third match of the tournament and a day short of her 18th birthday, scored a then-record WODI score of 173* against Ireland.

In 1998, Edwards played against Australia, and scored three half-centuries in the three Test series, with a high score of 87. She next played against India in 1999, and scored her maiden Test century in the only Test match, with 108 from 249 deliveries. She was, and remains, the second youngest player to hit a Women's Test match century, at 19 years and 210 days.

Edwards toured Australia and New Zealand with England in early 2000, scoring two half-centuries in the WODI series against Australia. In the summer of 2000, South Africa toured England for five WODIs, with Edwards scoring two half-centuries including 96* in the fourth match. At the 2000 Women's Cricket World Cup in New Zealand, Edwards made her third WODI century, scoring 139* against the Netherlands.

=== Injury and beyond ===
In 2001, Edwards obtained a cruciate ligament injury to her right knee, requiring surgery, which meant that she missed the whole season. She returned to play for England for the 2002 Women's Tri-Series.

After appearing for England throughout 2003, in the World Series of Women's Cricket, against Australia and against South Africa, Edwards scored her first international century since 2000 in 2004, scoring 102 in a WODI against South Africa at East London. During England's next series, against New Zealand, Edwards was the leading run-scorer in the WODI series, and scored 117 in the only Test match. On the same tour, Edwards made her Women's Twenty20 International (WT20I) debut, as she played in the first-ever international Twenty20 match for either gender.

Edwards was the leading run-scorer at the 2005 Women's Cricket World Cup, with 280 runs including a high score of 99 against South Africa. She helped England win the Women's Ashes in 2005, including top-scoring with 69 in the first innings of the first Test match.

=== International captaincy ===
Ahead of England's 2005–06 tour of Sri Lanka and India, Edwards was made captain of the side, with regular captain Clare Connor out with a foot injury. She captained her side to a 2–0 WODI victory over Sri Lanka in her first series as captain. The Test match with India was drawn, with the WODI series lost 4–1, although Edwards hit two half-centuries in the WODI series.

Clare Connor retired from international cricket in March 2006, with Edwards named as her permanent replacement. Her first series in permanent charge of the side came against India in England. She scored a century in the second innings of the 2nd Test match, with 105 as her side followed-on. In 2007, Edwards led the side to third place in the 2006–07 ICC Women's Quadrangular Series, scored her maiden WT20I half-century in a one-off match against South Africa, and led the side in a victorious WT20I series and WODI series loss against New Zealand, scoring a half-century in each series.

In early 2008, Edwards led the side in a Women's Ashes series for the first time, on England's tour of Australia and New Zealand. The side won the one-off Test match to defend the Ashes, with Edwards scoring 94 in the first innings and hitting the winning runs in the second. She was also the side's leading run-scorer in the drawn WODI series. She played her 100th WODI in the 4th match of the series, in which she hit 70* to help her side to a 7-wicket victory. England won their WODI series against New Zealand 3–1, with Edwards scoring two half-centuries as well as being the leading wicket-taker in the series, with 10 wickets. In the summer of 2008, Edwards was the leading run-scorer in England's T20I series against South Africa, top-scoring in all three of England's innings, as well as scoring a half-century apiece in England's WODI series against the West Indies and in their WODI series against South Africa. Her 76* in the third T20I against South Africa was at the time the highest score in WT20Is for England. At the end of the 2008 season, she was awarded the ICC Women's Cricketer of the Year Award at the ICC Awards in Dubai.

=== 2009 World Cup double and Ashes retention ===
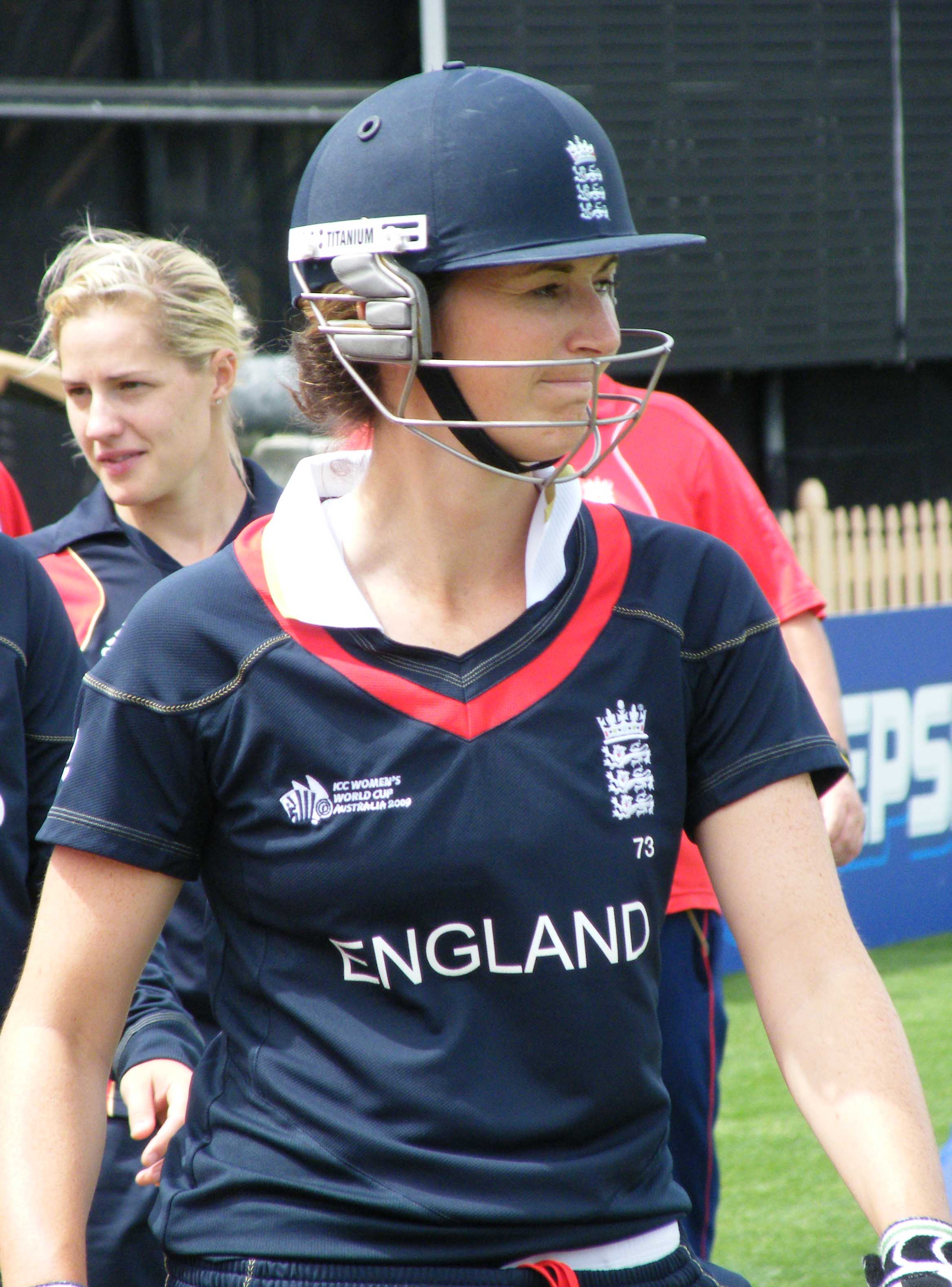
Edwards during the 2009 Women's Cricket World Cup.

In March 2009, Edwards led England at a World Cup for the first time. Edwards' best performance came against New Zealand in the Super Six round, where she scored her only half-century of the tournament, with 57, as well as taking 4/37 with the ball. The side reached the final at North Sydney Oval against New Zealand, with England emerging victorious by 4 wickets to win their third World Cup title. Edwards was named as captain of the team of the tournament at the end of the World Cup.

The following summer, she led England at the inaugural ICC Women's World Twenty20, held in England. She scored 61* in England's opening match of the tournament, helping her side to a 10-wicket victory over India. Two days later, it was announced that Edwards had received an MBE for her services to cricket. She was named Player of the Match in England's group stage victory over Pakistan, scoring 43 and taking 2/7, before leading England to the final of the tournament. Edwards scored just 9 in the final at Lord's, against New Zealand, but England were victorious by 6 wickets with three overs to spare. She was the third-highest run-scorer in the tournament.

Edwards and England topped off a victorious year by retaining the Women's Ashes, drawing the one-off Test match with Australia, with Edwards scoring 53* in the second innings to help secure the draw. Edwards was absent for part of the WODI series, but scored a half-century in the fourth match of the series. After the Ashes, she was awarded an MBE. Over the 2009–10 winter, Edwards led England on tours of the West Indies and India.

=== WODI appearance record, Ashes century, and World Cups ===
In 2010, Edwards led England in their disappointing 2010 ICC Women's World Twenty20 campaign, as they exited in the group stage. She scored one half-century against the touring New Zealand side later that summer, scoring 70 in England's 1-wicket victory in the first WODI. She also scored 72 in a one-off ODI against Ireland. In November 2010, England toured Sri Lanka, and in the 2nd WODI Edwards became the most-capped WODI player, with 142 caps, breaking the record of Karen Rolton. At the time, Clare Connor, then the England and Wales Cricket Board's Head of Women's Cricket, called her "a credit to women's cricket globally, a superb role model for girls who aspire to play for their country". The record was later broken by Mithali Raj. She also took her WODI best bowling figures in the match, with 4/30 from her 8 overs.

In England's series against Australia later that winter, Edwards made her first Test century in the Ashes, scoring 114*. She was also the leading run-scorer in the WODI series, scoring two half-centuries. In the summer of 2011, Edwards was England's leading run-scorer at the 2011 NatWest Women's T20 Quadrangular Series. Edwards led England on an unbeaten international winter in 2011–12, against South Africa and New Zealand, and scored a century in both WODI series: 138 in the 2nd ODI against South Africa and 137* in the 2nd ODI against New Zealand.

In May 2012, Edwards was appointed to the world cricket committee of the Marylebone Cricket Club, becoming the first woman to be appointed to the body. Edwards began the playing summer of 2012 by scoring 72* in a one-off WT20I against Ireland. Subsequently, she led England to series victories over India, Pakistan and West Indies in the lead-up to the 2012 ICC Women's World Twenty20.

England reached the final of the 2012 World Twenty20 before losing to Australia. Edwards top-scored in both the semi-final and final for England, and scoring 50* in England's group stage victory over India. Edwards ended the tournament as the leading run-scorer across the competition, with 172 runs, and was named Player of the Tournament. The World Twenty20 was followed by the 2013 Women's Cricket World Cup, with England finishing third. Edwards scored two centuries in the tournament, 109 against India in the Group Stage and 106* in the 3rd Place Play-off against New Zealand. She ended the tournament as the third-highest run-scorer across the competition, with 292 runs.

=== Two Ashes victories and Cricketer of the Year ===
At the start of the 2013 summer, Edwards was the leading run-scorer in England's WODI series victory against Pakistan. She then led England into the 2013 Women's Ashes series against Australia. England won the series, which was decided on a points-based system for the first time, with Edwards scoring two half-centuries in the WODI series. After the series, she described reclaiming the Ashes as the "proudest moment" of her career. After a tour of the West Indies in October and November 2013, England again contested the Ashes, this time in Australia. Edwards scored a half-century in the only Test match, and made her WT20I career high score in the first WT20I, with 92* in an England 9-wicket victory. England also won the series, becoming the third England Women's side to do so in Australia. England next played in the 2014 ICC Women's World Twenty20, again losing to Australia in the final. Edwards was the fourth-highest run-scorer across the competition, with a high score of 80 in England's victory over Bangladesh. In April 2014, in recognition of her achievements in 2013, Edwards was named one of the five Wisden Cricketers of the Year, becoming the second woman to be so honoured after Claire Taylor in 2009. She was also named the ECB Cricketer of the Year for 2013–14.

=== Professional contract ===
In May 2014, Edwards received one of the first 18 ECB central contracts, becoming one of the first English professional woman cricketers. In the summer of 2014, Edwards was the leading run-scorer in England's WODI series against India and in their WT20I series against South Africa. She scored 108* in the 2nd WODI against India, and half-centuries in two of the WT20Is against South Africa. In June 2014, Edwards was awarded a CBE in the Queen's Birthday Honours for service to cricket. At the end of the season, she was named the first PCA Women's Player of the Summer.

In the 2014–15 winter, Edwards scored one half-century in England's WODI series victory against New Zealand. In May 2015, she was named the ECB Cricketer of the Year for 2014–15. In the summer of 2015, she captained England in the Ashes against Australia, with Australia regaining the Ashes. Edwards passed fifty once in the series, in the second WODI.

=== 2016 World Twenty20 and international retirement ===
In February 2016, England played against South Africa, winning both the WODI and WT20I series. Following this, England played in the 2016 ICC Women's World Twenty20 in India, where they went out in the semi-finals against Australia. Edwards was the second-highest run-scorer in the tournament, with 202 runs including half-centuries against Bangladesh and Pakistan. England's failure at the tournament, with another knockout stages defeat to Australia, was seen as a "line-in-the-sand" moment, with things needing to change in the system. After the 2016 World Twenty20, England Head Coach Mark Robinson informed Edwards that she would not be selected for England's upcoming tours, intending instead to bring in younger players under new leadership. Following this decision, Edwards announced her retirement from international cricket. She was replaced as England captain by Heather Knight.

Edwards ended her international career with 309 appearances for England across all formats: 23 in Tests, 191 in ODIs and 95 in T20Is. She captained England on 220 occasions. At the end of her career, she had the second most appearances overall in Women's Test matches, and the most for England in WODIs. She was also England's second-leading run-scorer in Women's Test matches, and all-time leading run-scorer in both WODIs and WT20Is. She was also the first player to score 2,000 runs in WT20Is.

In November 2022, in recognition of her playing achievements, she was inducted into the ICC Cricket Hall of Fame.

== Post-playing career ==
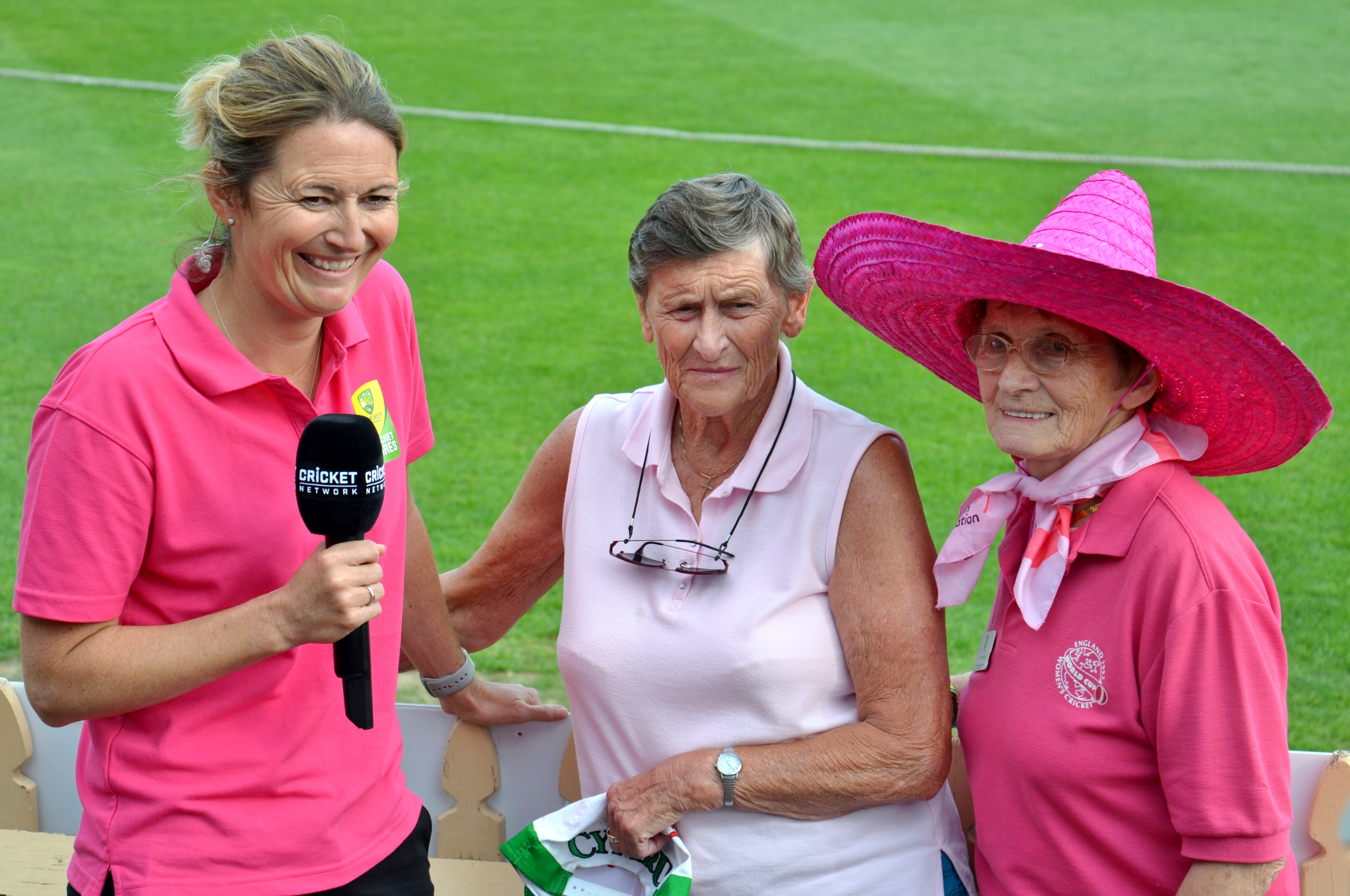
Edwards (left) alongside former England cricketers Lynne Thomas and Enid Bakewell during the 2017–18 Women's Ashes

=== Coaching ===
In October 2017, it was announced that Edwards was returning to her previous playing side Adelaide Strikers in the Women's Big Bash League as an assistant coach. She remained in the role for five seasons.

In April 2018, Edwards was appointed as Director of Women's Cricket at Hampshire, with responsibility for the management of both Hampshire Women and Southern Vipers. In July 2020, following reforms to the structure of domestic women's cricket in England, Edwards became head coach of Southern Vipers. She led the side to winning the inaugural Rachael Heyhoe Flint Trophy in her first season with the side, and won the title again in 2021. In June 2021, it was announced that the new regional Twenty20 competition would be named the Charlotte Edwards Cup, in honour of Edwards. Southern Vipers won their first Charlotte Edwards Cup in 2022. Edwards coached Southern Vipers to the domestic double in 2023.

Edwards also became coach of Southern Brave's women's side ahead of the inaugural season of The Hundred in 2021. The side reached the final of the first two editions of the tournament, but lost in the final both times. Southern Brave reached the final again in 2023, and this time won the competition.

In May 2022, Edwards was named as the head coach of Sydney Sixers in the Women's Big Bash League from the 2022–23 season onwards, moving from her assistant coach role at Adelaide Strikers. The side won a record eleven matches in the group stage of the competition during Edwards' first season in charge, but lost in the final to Adelaide Strikers.

After the departure of Lisa Keightley from the head coach role of England Women in the summer of 2022, Edwards initially expressed interest in taking on the role, but later ruled herself out. In February 2023, it was announced that Edwards would be the head coach of Mumbai Indians in the Women's Premier League. The side went on to win the inaugural edition of the tournament.

In November 2024, Edwards was named head coach at the newly professional Hampshire Women following the restructuring of English domestic women's cricket set to start in the 2025 season.

In April 2025, Edwards was named as Head Coach of the England Women's Cricket Team.

=== Other pursuits ===
Edwards regularly works as a commentator on cricket for Sky Sports. In February 2021, she became the first female president of the Professional Cricketers' Association, with her term lasting for two years.

Preceded by Jhulan Goswami	ICC Women's Cricketer of the Year; 2008	Succeeded by Claire Taylor
