= New Zealand women's cricket team in England in 2010 =

International cricket tour

| | New Zealand | England |
- Dates: 29 June – 20 July 2010
| Captains | Aimee Watkins | Charlotte Edwards |

One Day International series
- Results: England won the 5-match series 3–2
| Most runs | Maria Fahey (154) | Claire Taylor (166) |
| Most wickets | Lucy Doolan (6); Erin Bermingham (6) | Jenny Gunn (9) |
- Player of the series: Lydia Greenway (Eng)

Twenty20 International series
- Results: New Zealand won the 3-match series 2–1
| Most runs | Suzie Bates (94) | Sarah Taylor (85) |
| Most wickets | Sian Ruck (5); Lucy Doolan (5) | Danielle Hazell (8) |
- Player of the series: Suzie Bates (NZ)

The New Zealand national women's cricket team toured England from 29 June to 20 July 2010 where they played the England women's cricket team in five One Day Internationals (ODIs) and three Twenty20s Internationals (T20Is). They also played against Ireland in one ODI.

== T20I series ==
=== 1st T20I ===
29 June 2010
Scorecard

| England; 150/5 (20 overs) | v | New Zealand; 113 (18.5 overs) |
| Charlotte Edwards 46 (50); Sian Ruck 2/24 (4 overs) | | Sara McGlashan 25 (28); Danni Wyatt 3/12 (1.5 overs) |

England won by 37 runs
County Ground, Chelmsford
Umpires: Neil Bainton (Eng) and Steve O'Shaughnessy (Eng)
Player of the match: Lydia Greenway (Eng)

- England won the toss and elected to bat.

=== 2nd T20I ===
1 July 2010
Scorecard

| New Zealand; 147/8 (20 overs) | v | England; 143/8 (20 overs) |
| Suzie Bates 68 (55); Danielle Hazell 3/19 (4 overs) | | Sarah Taylor 73 (66); Sian Ruck 3/15 (4 overs) |

New Zealand won by 4 runs
The Rose Bowl, Southampton
Umpires: Trevor Jesty (Eng) and Steve Malone (Eng)
Player of the match: Suzie Bates (NZ)

- New Zealand won the toss and elected to bat.

=== 3rd T20I ===
2 July 2010
Scorecard

| New Zealand; 124/8 (20 overs) | v | England; 115/8 (20 overs) |
| Suzie Bates 26 (32); Danielle Hazell 3/16 (4 overs) | | Charlotte Edwards 19 (19); Sophie Devine 3/26 (4 overs); Lucy Doolan 3/26 (4 overs) |

New Zealand won by 9 runs
County Ground, Hove
Umpires: Martin Bodenham (Eng) and Trevor Jesty (Eng)
Player of the match: Nicola Browne (NZ)

- New Zealand won the toss and elected to bat.

== Only ODI: Ireland v New Zealand ==
The New Zealand national women's cricket team played Ireland in a One Day International (ODI) on 4 July 2010.

4 July 2010
Scorecard

| New Zealand; 296/8 (50 overs) | v | Ireland; 137 (44.4 overs) |
| Liz Perry 70 (69); Ciara Metcalfe 3/54 (9 overs) | | Jill Whelan 36 (81); Lucy Doolan 3/7 (5 overs) |

New Zealand won by 159 runs
Kibworth Cricket Club New Ground, Kibworth, Leicestershire
Umpires: Ian Armitage (Eng) and George Wood (Eng)

- Ireland won the toss and elected to field.
- Laura Delany, Kim Garth, Mary Waldron (Ire) and Liz Perry (NZ) all made their WODI debuts.

== Tour match ==
7 July 2010
Scorecard

| England Academy; 190 (49.5 overs) | v | New Zealand; 193/4 (35.3 overs) |
| Caroline Atkins 63 (108); Amy Satterthwaite 4/43 (8.5 overs) | | Suzie Bates 59 (68); Isa Guha 2/32 (6.3 overs) |

New Zealand won by 6 wickets
Kibworth Cricket Club New Ground, Kibworth, Leicestershire
Umpires: Paul Pollard (Eng) and Rob Newman (Eng)

- New Zealand won the toss and elected to field.

== ODI series ==
=== 1st ODI ===
10 July 2010
Scorecard

| New Zealand; 231/8 (50 overs) | v | England; 234/9 (49.3 overs) |
| Maria Fahey 61 (106); Katherine Brunt 3/31 (10 overs) | | Charlotte Edwards 70 (81); Nicola Browne 3/31 (10 overs) |

England won by 1 wicket
County Ground, Taunton
Umpires: David Millns (Eng) and Peter Hartley (Eng)
Player of the match: Katherine Brunt (Eng)

- New Zealand won the toss and elected to bat.

=== 2nd ODI ===
12 July 2010
Scorecard

| England; 208/9 (50 overs) | v | New Zealand; 211/6 (47.5 overs) |
| Claire Taylor 66 (87); Suzie Bates 3/27 (7 overs) | | Suzie Bates 75* (107); Laura Marsh 3/34 (10 overs) |

New Zealand won by 4 wickets
County Ground, Taunton
Umpires: David Millns (Eng) and Peter Hartley (Eng)
Player of the match: Suzie Bates (NZ)

- England won the toss and elected to bat.
- Erin Bermingham (NZ) made her WODI debut.

=== 3rd ODI ===
15 July 2010
Scorecard

| New Zealand; 220/9 (50 overs) | v | England; 223/4 (48.4 overs) |
| Aimee Watkins 68 (65); Jenny Gunn 5/31 (10 overs) | | Sarah Taylor 64 (90); Amy Satterthwaite 2/20 (7 overs) |

England won by 6 wickets
County Ground, Derby
Umpires: John Steele (Eng) and Stephen Gale (Eng)
Player of the match: Jenny Gunn (Eng)

- England won the toss and elected to field.

=== 4th ODI ===
17 July 2010
Scorecard

| New Zealand; 136/9 (50 overs) | v | England; 139/1 (46.1 overs) |
| Aimee Watkins 42 (82); Katherine Brunt 3/31 (10 overs) | | Claire Taylor 51* (99); Sophie Devine 1/30 (8 overs) |

England won by 9 wickets
Shaw Lane, Barnsley
Umpires: John Steele (Eng) and Michael Gough (Eng)
Player of the match: Sarah Taylor (Eng)

- New Zealand won the toss and elected to bat.

=== 5th ODI ===
20 July 2010
Scorecard

| England; 176/9 (50 overs) | v | New Zealand; 178/4 (46.4 overs) |
| Lydia Greenway 65 (83); Erin Bermingham 4/35 (10 overs) | | Sara McGlashan 65* (113); Katherine Brunt 2/38 (10 overs) |

New Zealand won by 6 wickets
Lord's, London
Umpires: Nick Cook (Eng) and Tim Robinson (Eng)
Player of the match: Erin Bermingham (NZ)

- England won the toss and elected to bat.
