= England women's cricket team in India in 2009–10 =

English women's cricket team in India in 2009–10
	India	England
- Dates: 17 February – 8 March 2010
Captains	Jhulan Goswami	Charlotte Edwards

One Day International series
- Results: India won the 5-match series 3–2
Most runs	Mithali Raj (287)	Ebony Rainford-Brent (120)
Most wickets	Gouher Sultana (12)	Katherine Brunt (10)
- Player of the series: Mithali Raj (Ind)

Twenty20 International series
- Results: England won the 3-match series 2–1
Most runs	Harmanpreet Kaur (74)	Jenny Gunn (74)
Most wickets	Gouher Sultana (6)	Danielle Hazell (5)

The England women's cricket team toured India in February and March 2010, playing five One Day Internationals and three Women's Twenty20 Internationals. The Indian team won the ODI series 3–2, whilst England won the T20I series 2–1.

== Touring party ==
Full touring party:

- Charlotte Edwards (captain)
- Caroline Atkins
- Tammy Beaumont (wicket-keeper)
- Katherine Brunt
- Lydia Greenway
- Isa Guha
- Jenny Gunn
- Danielle Hazell
- Laura Marsh
- Beth Morgan
- Ebony Rainford-Brent
- Nicky Shaw
- Anya Shrubsole
- Sarah Taylor (wicket-keeper)
- Danni Wyatt

Heather Knight replaced the injured Sarah Taylor after the first ODI.

== Tour match ==
=== 50-over match: Board President's XI v England ===
17 February 2010
Scorecard

England; 273/9 (50 overs)	v	(India) Indian Board President's XI; 132 (41.2 overs)
Lydia Greenway 81 (82); Diana David 2/51 (10 overs)		Babita Mandlik 33 (56); Charlotte Edwards 3/14 (4 overs)

England Women won by 141 runs
M. Chinnaswamy Stadium, Bengaluru
Umpires: Chettithody Shamshuddin (Ind) and Suresh Shastri (Ind)

- England Women won the toss and elected to bat.

== WODI series ==
=== 1st ODI ===
19 February 2010
Scorecard

India; 199/5 (50 overs)	v	England; 164 (45 overs)
Priyanka Roy 69* (98); Charlotte Edwards 1/27 (6 overs)		Ebony Rainford-Brent 64 (83); Jhulan Goswami 3/16 (8 overs)

India Women won by 35 runs
M. Chinnaswamy Stadium, Bengaluru
Umpires: Chettithody Shamshuddin (Ind) and Suresh Shastri (Ind)

- India Women won the toss and elected to bat.

=== 2nd ODI ===
21 February 2010
Scorecard

England; 183/8 (50 overs)	v	India; 180 (49.3 overs)
Jenny Gunn 64 (92); Gouher Sultana 4/30 (10 overs)		Mithali Raj 91* (138); Katherine Brunt 5/22 (10 overs)

England Women won by 3 runs
M. Chinnaswamy Stadium, Bengaluru
Umpires: K. N. Ananthapadmanabhan (Ind) and Sameer Bandekar (Ind)

- England Women won the toss and elected to bat.

=== 3rd ODI ===
24 February 2010
Scorecard

England; 130 (49.2 overs)	v	India; 133/3 (40.5 overs)
Beth Morgan 24 (54); Rumeli Dhar 4/19 (10 overs)		Anjum Chopra 61* (134); Jenny Gunn 2/19 (7 overs)

India Women won by 7 wickets
Dr. Y. S. Rajasekhara Reddy ACA–VDCA Cricket Stadium, Visakhapatnam
Umpires: K. N. Ananthapadmanabhan (Ind) and Sameer Bandekar (Ind)

- England Women won the toss and elected to bat.
- Soniya Dabir (Ind) made her WODI debut.

=== 4th ODI ===
26 February 2010
Scorecard

England; 152/9 (50 overs)	v	India; 156/5 (44.4 overs)
Charlotte Edwards 57* (112); Preeti Dimri 3/18 (10 overs)		Mithali Raj 84* (123); Charlotte Edwards 1/11 (4 overs)

India Women won by 5 wickets
Dr. Y. S. Rajasekhara Reddy ACA–VDCA Cricket Stadium, Visakhapatnam
Umpires: K. N. Ananthapadmanabhan (Ind) and Subrat Das (Ind)

- India Women won the toss and elected to field.

=== 5th ODI ===
1 March 2010
Scorecard

India; 206/9 (50 overs)	v	England; 210/8 (49.5 overs)
Harmanpreet Kaur 84 (113); Nicky Shaw 3/34 (10 overs)		Heather Knight 49 (101); Gouher Sultana 2/33 (8.5 overs)

England Women won by 2 wickets
Bandra Kurla Complex Ground, Mumbai
Umpires: Sameer Bandekar (Ind) and Subrat Das (Ind)

- England Women won the toss and elected to field.
- Danni Wyatt and Heather Knight (Eng) made their WODI debuts.

== WT20I series ==
=== 1st T20I ===
4 March 2010
Scorecard

India; 125/5 (20 overs)	v	England; 126/8 (20 overs)
Mithali Raj 30 (26); Charlotte Edwards 1/20 (4 overs)		Jenny Gunn 34 (24); Soniya Dabir 3/23 (4 overs)

England Women won by 2 wickets
Bandra Kurla Complex Ground, Mumbai
Umpires: Sudhir Asnani (Ind) and Sundaram Ravi (Ind)

- England Women won the toss and elected to field.
- Babita Mandlik, Soniya Dabir (Ind) and Danni Wyatt (Eng) made their WT20I debuts.

=== 2nd T20I ===
6 March 2008
Scorecard

India; 126/7 (20 overs)	v	England; 96 (19.2 overs)
Sulakshana Naik 36 (34); Danielle Hazell 3/20 (4 overs)		Lydia Greenway 29 (35); Gouher Sultana 2/16 (3.2 overs)

India Women won by 30 runs
Bandra Kurla Complex Ground, Mumbai
Umpires: Sundaram Ravi (Ind) and Ulhas Gandhe (Ind)

- England Women won the toss and elected to field.
- Diana David (Ind) made her WT20I debut.

=== 3rd T20I ===
8 March 2008
Scorecard

India; 125/4 (20 overs)	v	England; 126/5 (19.2 overs)
Harmanpreet Kaur 30* (25); Danielle Hazell 1/18 (4 overs)		Laura Marsh 46* (53); Gouher Sultana 3/26 (4 overs)

England Women won by 5 wickets
Bandra Kurla Complex Ground, Mumbai
Umpires: Sudhir Asnani (Ind) and Ulhas Gandhe (Ind)

- England Women won the toss and elected to field.
