= India women's cricket team in England in 2012 =

Indian women's cricket team in England in 2012
	England	India
- Dates: 23 June 2012 – 11 July 2012
Captains	Charlotte Edwards	Mithali Raj

One Day International series
- Results: England won the 5-match series 3–2
Most runs	Arran Brindle (144)	Mithali Raj (251)
Most wickets	Katherine Brunt (8)	Nagarajan Niranjana (9)
- Player of the series: Georgia Elwiss (England)

Twenty20 International series
- Results: England won the 2-match series 2–0
Most runs	Sarah Taylor (136)	Harmanpreet Kaur (49)
Most wickets	Katherine Brunt (5)	Nagarajan Niranjana (2); Gouher Sultana (2)
- Player of the series: Sarah Taylor (England)

The India national women's cricket team toured England in June and July 2012, playing five One Day Internationals (ODIs) and two Twenty20 Internationals (T20Is) against the England cricket team, and one ODI against Ireland women's cricket team. England won the one-day series 3–2, and the Twenty20 series 2–0, while India won the only ODI against Ireland.

== One Day International match against Ireland ==
24 June 2012
Scorecard

Ireland; 107/6 (20 overs)	v	India; 109/1 (16.4 overs)
Cecelia Joyce 35 (45); Archana Das 2/17 (4 overs)		Poonam Raut 51* (50); Louise McCarthy 1/29 (3.4 overs)

India won by 9 wickets
Haslegrave Ground, Loughborough
Umpires: Benjamin Debenham and Nigel Llong

- India won the toss and elected to field.
- Match was reduced to 20 overs per side due to rain.

== Twenty20 International series ==
=== 1st T20I ===
26 June 2012
Scorecard

England; 137/5 (20 overs)	v	India; 104/8 (20 overs)
Sarah Taylor 69 (49); Gouher Sultana 2/21 (4 overs)		Mithali Raj 26 (34); Danielle Wyatt 2/10 (4 overs)

England won by 33 runs
St Lawrence Ground, Canterbury
Umpires: Trevor Jesty and George Sharp
Player of the match: Sarah Taylor (England)

- India won the toss and elected to field.

=== 2nd T20I ===
28 June 2012
Scorecard

India; 114 (20 overs)	v	England; 117/2 (17.1 overs)
Harmanpreet Kaur 34 (38); Katherine Brunt 3/18 (4 overs)		Sarah Taylor 67* (48); Nagarajan Niranjana 1/18 (3 overs)

England won by 8 wickets
County Ground, Chelmsford
Umpires: Nigel Cowley and Martin Saggers
Player of the match: Sarah Taylor (England)

- India won the toss and elected to bat.

== One Day International series ==
=== 1st ODI ===
1 July 2012
scorecard

England; 229 (49.1 overs)	v	India; 230/5 (49.3 overs)
Arran Brindle 58 (73); Archana Das 4/61 (9.1 overs)		Mithali Raj 94* (111); Danielle Hazell 2/34 (6.3 overs)

India won by 5 wickets
Lord's, London
Umpires: Nick Cook and Steve O'Shaughnessy
Player of the match: Mithali Raj (India)

- England won the toss and elected to bat.

=== 2nd ODI ===
4 July 2012
scorecard

India; 129 (47.5 overs)	v	England; 115 (47.2 overs)
Amita Sharma 42* (87); Katherine Brunt 4/20 (10 overs)		Tammy Beaumont 31 (89); Jhulan Goswami 4/17 (8.2 overs)

India won by 14 runs
County Ground, Taunton
Umpires: Paul Baldwin and Peter Willey
Player of the match: Amita Sharma (India)

- England won the toss and elected to field.

=== 3rd ODI ===
5 July 2012
scorecard

India; 173/5 (50 overs)	v	England; 177/7 (47.2 overs)
Mithali Raj 92* (138); Danielle Wyatt 2/45 (10 overs)		Tammy Beaumont 44 (81); Gouher Sultana 3/26 (8 overs)

England won by 3 wickets
County Ground, Taunton
Umpires: Paul Baldwin and Peter Willey
Player of the match: Mithali Raj (India)

- England won the toss and elected to field.

=== 4th ODI ===
8 July 2012
scorecard

India; 173/9 (50 overs)	v	England; 177/7 (49 overs)
Mithali Raj 58 (111); Arran Brindle 3/20 (5 overs)		Sarah Taylor 43 (68); Nagarajan Niranjana 3/24 (10 overs)

England won by 3 wickets
Boscawen Park, Truro
Umpires: Mark Benson and Mark Eggleston
Player of the match: Jenny Gunn (England)

- England won the toss and elected to field.

=== 5th ODI ===
11 July 2012
scorecard

India; 152/8 (50 overs)	v	England; 124/4 (36 overs)
Harmanpreet Kaur 40 (106); Georgia Elwiss 3/17 (10 overs)		Lydia Greenway 37 (67); Amita Sharma 1/13 (4 overs)

England won by 29 runs (D/L)
Sir Paul Getty's Ground, Wormsley
Umpires: Neil Bainton and David Millns
Player of the match: Georgia Elwiss (England)

- England won the toss and elected to field.
- Rain stopped play after 36 overs of England's chase.
