= Claire Taylor =

English cricketer (born 1975)

Claire Taylor MBE
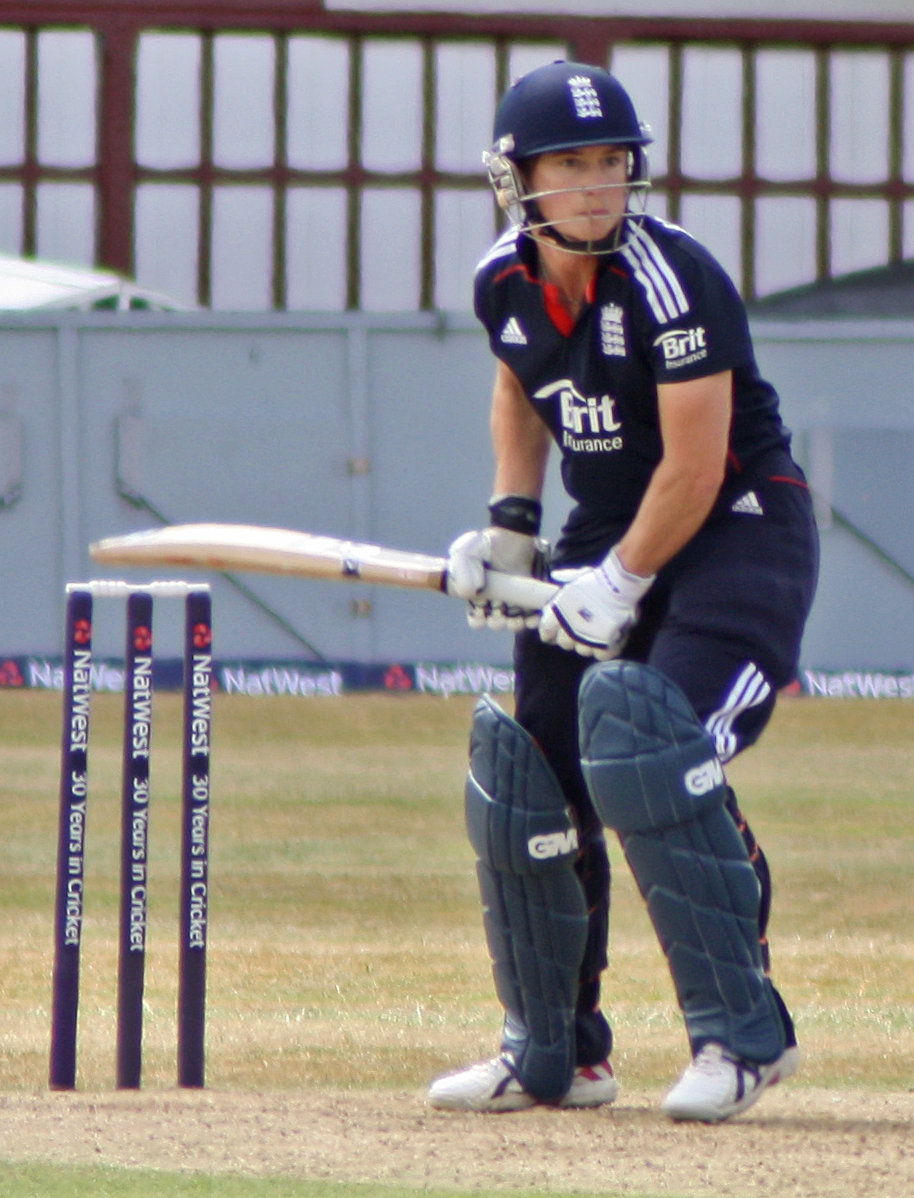

Personal information
- Full name: Samantha Claire Taylor
- Born: 25 September 1975 (age 51); Amersham, Buckinghamshire, England
- Batting: Right-handed
- Role: Batter, occasional wicket-keeper

International information
- National side: England (1998–2011)
- Test debut (cap 127): 15 July 1999 v India
- Last Test: 10 July 2009 v Australia
- ODI debut (cap 78): 19 July 1998 v Australia
- Last ODI: 7 July 2011 v Australia
- ODI shirt no.: 6
- T20I debut (cap 11): 5 August 2004 v New Zealand
- Last T20I: 27 June 2011 v Australia

Domestic team information
- Years: Team
- 1993–1999: Thames Valley
- 2000–2011: Berkshire
- 2002/03–2004/05: Canterbury

Career statistics
Competition	WTest	WODI	T20I	WLA
Matches	15	126	27	298
Runs scored	1,030	4,101	615	10,369
Batting average	41.20	40.20	27.95	43.02
100s/50s	4/2	8/23	0/3	17/66
Top score	177	156*	76*	156*
Balls bowled	–	–	–	578
Wickets	–	–	–	3/26
Bowling average	–	–	–	23.27
5 wickets in innings	–	–	–	0
10 wickets in match	–	–	–	0
Best bowling	–	–	–	3/26
Catches/stumpings	18/0	41/5	12/2	114/57
- Source: CricketArchive, 14 March 2021

Samantha Claire Taylor MBE (born 25 September 1975) is a former cricketer who represented England more than 150 times between 1998 and 2011. A top order batter, (Note: In women's cricket, "batsman" is commonly used, alongside "batter".) Taylor was the first woman to be named a Wisden Cricketer of the Year. Along with Charlotte Edwards, she was the mainstay of England's batting during the first decade of the 21st century, and played a key role in the team's two world titles in 2009.

Taylor did not play cricket until the age of 13, but four years later made her county debut. Initially considered a wicket-keeper with limited batting ability, Taylor struggled to break into the England team. She made her international debut in 1998, and within two years was a regular in the team. After an unsuccessful World Cup in 2000, Taylor left her job to become a full-time cricketer. Over the subsequent five years, she developed into one of the leading batsmen in women's cricket, but after another failure in the 2005 World Cup she resumed her career alongside cricket.

Despite her struggles at the World Cup, Taylor continued to improve as a batsman, and in 2006, she scored 156 not out, the highest individual total in an ODI at Lord's Cricket Ground. Her batting successes resulted in her being short-listed for the ICC Women's Cricketer of the Year in 2007 and 2008, and she won the award in 2009. After being the leading run-scorer in the 2009 World Cup, and player of the tournament in the World Twenty20 later that year, she was less consistent from 2010, though she performed well in the pair of quadrangular tournaments played in England during her final summer of cricket, and completed her career with batting averages in excess of 40 in both Test and ODI cricket. In July 2018, she was inducted into the ICC Hall of Fame.

== Early life and career ==
Samantha Claire Taylor was born in Amersham, Buckinghamshire, on 25 September 1975, as part of a sporting family: her father played rugby, and her mother played hockey. She attended Dolphin School in Hurst, Berkshire, where she initially played softball, participating as the only girl in the school team. Taylor did not play cricket until a summer camp at the age of 13, but thereafter improved to such a level that she captained the Dolphin School cricket team, playing alongside the boys. She subsequently moved to The Abbey School, Reading for a short time, and finally Kendrick School. Although she primarily played hockey as a teenager, at which she represented England at Under-17 and Under-19 as a forward, she began playing women's county cricket for Thames Valley, making her debut for the side in May 1993.

Taylor was awarded a place at The Queen's College, Oxford to study mathematics in 1994. At Oxford, Taylor earned three blues for hockey, and three half blues for cricket. (Note: At Oxford, sports people are awarded the Oxford "colours", some sports being categorised as "full blue" and some as "half blue".) She also played for the college men's cricket team, which included Iain Sutcliffe, who later played over three hundred county cricket matches. During her time at Oxford, Taylor continued to play for Thames Valley, and scored her maiden century in the women's County Championship, scoring 109 runs against Lancashire and Cheshire in July 1996. Her highest score prior to that innings had been 37. The following year, having graduated from Oxford with a second-class honours degree, Taylor scored successive half-centuries for Thames Valley, reaching 97 against Sussex, 77 against Lancashire and Cheshire, and an unbeaten 62 against East Midlands. She had been making intermittent appearances for England at various age group levels for the previous five years, and in September 1997, she scored 85 for England Under-21s against the touring South African side. Even so, she was not included in the team for the 1997 Women's Cricket World Cup, but she was named as a non-travelling reserve, something that Taylor said "confirmed to me my breakthrough into the senior squad."

== International breakthrough ==
In April 1998, Taylor travelled to South Africa as part of the England Under-21 squad that competed in the women's Inter-Provincial Tournament, scoring two half-centuries in the competition. Her full international debut occurred later that year, during the fourth One Day International (ODI) between England and Australia. Playing as a specialist batsman, Taylor scored one run during a heavy defeat for England. Taylor finished the 1998 women's County Championship with two strong batting performances: she struck her second century, scoring 103 runs against West, followed by 65 runs against Surrey. Towards the end of the English season, she kept wicket for England in a match against England Under-21s, scoring an unbeaten 45 runs. She retained her place in the England squad for the series against the touring Indian team in 1999. England struggled in the series, and Taylor was one of a number of inexperienced players in the squad who "failed to seize their chance", according to the Wisden Cricketers' Almanack report. Taylor's highest score in the series was 12 runs, and she had batting averages of 11.00 in the ODIs, and 5.50 in the solitary Test match.

During the subsequent English winter of 1999–2000, Taylor was part of the touring party that travelled to Australia and New Zealand for nine ODIs. The tour was a failure for the team: they lost all nine international matches, and their only win was a warm-up match against Wellington, in which Taylor scored 83 runs. She secured another half-century in the second ODI against New Zealand, scoring 56 runs after opening the innings. In a series in which England's batting was described as dismal, her half-century was one of only two in ODIs during the tour, and Wisden reported that giving Taylor an "overdue opportunity" was one saving grace of the trip. She struggled for runs in the series against the touring South Africans in 2000, aggregating 68 runs from five innings, as once again the English batting – particularly the top order – was criticised. After the conclusion of the series, Taylor struck a century in a county match, scoring 115 runs for Berkshire against Surrey.

England's "slide down the international ladder" continued during the 2000 Women's Cricket World Cup, according to Wisden. The batting was once more culpable, but Taylor provided some relief. She scored 267 runs in the tournament at an average of 66.75, ranking her among the top ten batsmen. She struck her first century in international cricket; scoring 137 not out against Sri Lanka. In doing so, she shared a partnership of 188 runs with Jane Cassar, which is a record for the fifth wicket in women's ODIs. England failed to qualify from the group stage of the competition.

== Full-time cricketer ==
After the 2000 World Cup, Taylor wanted to focus on her desire to become one of the best batsmen in the world. In order to achieve this, she decided to become a full-time cricketer. After university, she had joined Procter & Gamble, and by 2001 she was earning £38,000 as an IT assistant manager at the company. In contrast, her income from cricket totalled £7,000, and in order to afford to quit her IT job, she had to move back in with her parents. England's next series was against the World Cup runners-up, Australia, who toured in June and July 2001. England's batting remained unreliable, and Australia won all five matches between the sides: two Test matches and three ODIs. Taylor was praised as the only highlight of the English batting; her innings of 50 not out was the highest score by her side in any of the ODIs. In the second Test, she significantly improved on her previous best Test score of 18 runs, batting for over four hours in a gritty performance to reach 137 runs. Taylor missed the tour of India in January 2002 after injuring her knee in a training session, but returned the following summer with a string of good performances in the Super Fours—a competition in which the England selectors place the 48 leading players into four teams—trailing only her England teammate Charlotte Edwards as the leading run-scorer. In the four ODIs that season, against New Zealand and India, Taylor failed to make an impact, scoring just 43 runs in total.

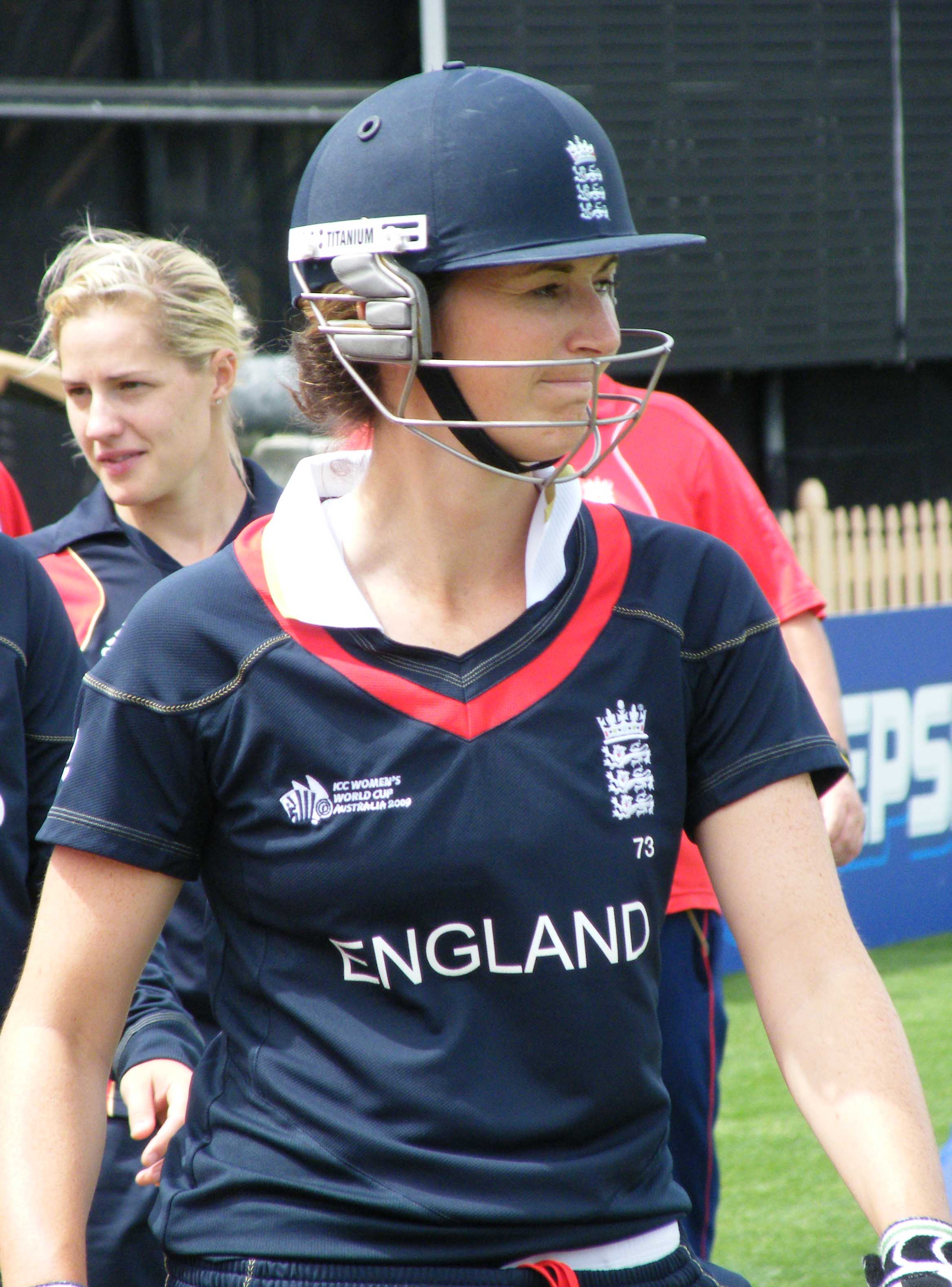
Taylor and Charlotte Edwards (pictured) were England's leading run-scorers between 2000 and 2010, accumulating over 3,000 runs each.

Ahead of a tour by the England women to New Zealand and Australia, Taylor competed in the State League, a one-day competition in New Zealand, for the Canterbury Magicians. She finished the tournament in the top-five batsmen, scoring 252 runs at an average of 42.00. Unfortunately for England, her good form did not continue into the international matches: in her seven ODI matches, she scored 87 runs. She continued to struggle at the start of the 2003 English domestic season, prompting Wisden to report that she "had barely scraped a run" in the County Championship matches. Despite her struggles, she survived an overhaul of the England squad, in which seven of the players who had toured Australia and New Zealand had been dropped. She repaid the faith shown in her, striking centuries in both Test matches against South Africa. The first, a score of 177 runs, was the highest total she made in Test cricket, and was scored over six and a half hours, and was just twelve runs short of the highest by any England woman. Two weeks later, she became one of only five women, as of 2012, to have scored centuries in consecutive Test matches, when she scored 131 runs at Taunton. Her performances in the ODI series were less eye-catching, but a half-century in the first match helped her finish second to Laura Newton as England's leading run-scorer.

Taylor competed in the State League for the second consecutive year in early 2004, and finished with the second-most runs in the competition, scoring 401 runs at an average of 44.55. From New Zealand, she travelled to South Africa to join up with the England team for five ODIs. After scoring 90 runs in a warm-up contest against an Invitational XI, she finished as England's second most prolific run-scorer behind Edwards, though she only once reached a half-century in the international matches. Back in England for the 2004 Super Fours competition, Taylor and Edwards once more headed the batting tables, Taylor narrowly trailing her international teammate in terms of runs scored, but ahead of her on batting average, having scored 351 runs at 87.75. In the subsequent series against New Zealand, Taylor was the top-scorer in the first Twenty20 International match played by either gender. Despite the quicker-scoring nature of the Twenty20 game, Taylor was praised for her measured batting and placement. In the ODIs, England possessed greater depth in their batting, making the team less reliant on Taylor and Edwards' performances. That depth helped them to win the series 3–2, despite a low-scoring sequence of matches for Taylor in which she averaged below twenty.

In preparation for the 2005 Women's Cricket World Cup in South Africa, Taylor played her third and final season in the State League, though her 229 runs at an average of 38.16 were the lowest she achieved in any year of the competition. During a short warm-up series against South Africa, she enjoyed batting success, scoring 94 and 47 in the two ODIs, and then an unbeaten 166 runs against a side from Gauteng and North West. After the first round of matches were all lost to rain, Taylor struck the highest score of the tournament in England's second match, against Sri Lanka. She scored 136 runs from 128 balls, and shared century partnerships with both Edwards and Clare Connor to help England record a large victory. She made little impact against India in the next match, but then scored 55 not out against South Africa and 46 against New Zealand to help ensure England's qualification for the semi-finals. Cricinfo reported that Australia were "undoubted favourites" for their semi-final clash with England, and that Taylor would be one of her side's key players for the contest. After the early loss of Laura Newton, Taylor was dismissed for the third duck of her ODI career, and England subsided to a five-wicket loss. She finished the tournament as one of the top-three batsmen by both runs-scored and average, aggregating 265 runs at 53.00.

== Further development ==
After the World Cup, Taylor was disheartened by both her own, and England's, lack of success. She bemoaned that the sacrifices she had made had come to nothing, and after talking to psychologists, she realised that she needed to readdress her work–life balance. An amateur violinist, she was accepted into the Reading Orchestra, and by early 2006 was working out of the University of Reading as a performance management consultant.

In the English summer of 2005, England hosted Australia for two Test matches and six limited-overs contests. The two Tests formed The Women's Ashes, an accolade that England had not won since 1963. In the first Test, Taylor scored a patient 35 runs in the first innings, and shared a partnership of 81 with Edwards, but the pair fell in quick succession, and England struggled thereafter. In the second innings, England required over 300 runs to win, but their top-order collapsed, losing three wickets for just fourteen runs. Taylor suffered a duck in the match, and only a century by Arran Brindle rescued a draw for her side. In the second Test, which England won to secure the Ashes, Taylor scored 43 runs in the first innings to help England open up a 158-run lead. Taylor finished the five-match ODI series as England's leading run-scorer, totalling 325 runs at an average of 65.00. After hitting half-centuries in the first and the third matches, she was praised by The Daily Telegraph for the quality of her "on-driving and cutting" as she scored 116 runs in the fourth match to level the series 2–2.

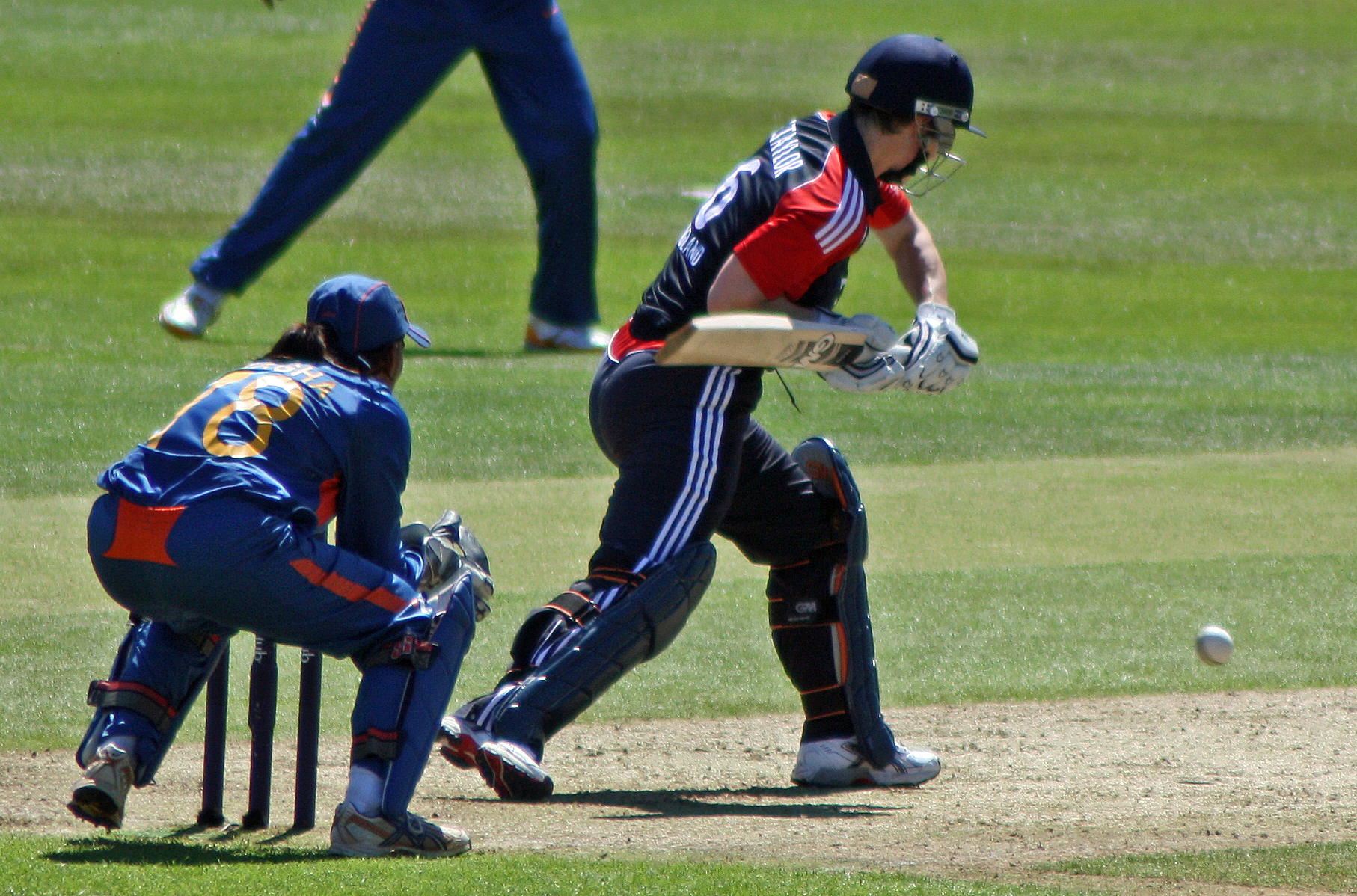
Taylor batting against India in 2011.

Taylor, and England, had a difficult tour of Sri Lanka and India in late 2005; after winning the two ODIs against Sri Lanka, England drew the only Test against India and lost the ODI series 4–1. Taylor only scored 76 runs in the seven ODI matches, and made scores of five and three in the Test. She re-found her batting form at the start of the 2006 English cricket season, topping the batting averages in the 2006 Super Fours competition, scoring two centuries and two half-centuries in six matches for the Sapphires.

Facing the touring Indians later that summer, Taylor made small totals in her first two appearances at the crease, scoring 10 in the only Twenty20 match, and 32 in the first innings of their solitary Test. She reached her fourth and final century in a Test match in the second innings, scoring 115 runs to put England into a potentially match winning position, though the match finished as a draw. The first game of the ODI series featured what the Marylebone Cricket Club describe as "Taylor's finest hour in an England shirt". Batting at number three, Taylor was called upon early, after opening batsman Edwards was run out in the third over. She was dropped twice in quick succession during her innings, but continued to reach her century from 110 balls. Having reached the milestone, she scored more rapidly and remained 156 not out at the end of the innings, hitting 9 fours in her 151-ball innings. The score was the highest of Taylor's ODI career, and is the joint fourth-highest total in women's ODI cricket. (Note: As of November 2012.) It is also the highest score made in an ODI match at Lord's by either gender, passing the 138 runs scored by Viv Richards in 1979.

In the Women's Quadrangular Series hosted by India in early 2007, Taylor was England's best performer with the bat. Despite her side losing all six of their group matches, she finished the tournament with the second-most runs of any player, totalling 346. She scored half-centuries against each of the other three teams competing—Australia, India and New Zealand—and also scored an unbeaten 113 in the first match against Australia. She had a relatively quiet domestic season in 2007, ranking sixth amongst run-scorers in the Super Fours, having passed 50 runs just once, and despite ranking second by both runs scored and batting average in the County Championship, Taylor only scored two half-centuries in her five appearances in that competition. England started the summer with four Twenty20 matches, one against South Africa and three against New Zealand, in which Taylor made three scores of 20 or more, but did not reach a half-century. In the third ODI against New Zealand, she scored her sixth century in the format, but her 110 runs came from 133 deliveries, and the Wisden series report suggests that the scoring rate was too slow: New Zealand chased down the total in fewer than 36 overs. In the next match, Taylor scored 72 as England attempted to chase down 240 runs to win, but they were eventually bowled out 43 runs short. Though she only made small totals in the other three matches of the series, Taylor finished as the leading run-scorer in the series, though New Zealand's Aimee Watkins had a superior batting average. Her performances over the year from August 2006 resulted in Taylor being shortlisted for the ICC Women's Cricketer of the Year award, alongside Australia's Lisa Sthalekar and the eventual winner, India's Jhulan Goswami. During the voting period, Taylor scored three centuries and three half-centuries in international cricket.

== Leading batsman ==
England travelled to Australia and New Zealand in early 2008 attempting to improve on their previous visits. In ten ODI matches in Australia against their hosts previously, England had only managed one win, while against New Zealand they had won just three of fifteen contests. England started badly, losing two of their warm-up matches by significant margins, and then falling 21 runs short in the Twenty20 match which opened the series. Taylor top-scored for England in their Twenty20 defeat with 34 runs from 32 balls. She made a similar score in the first ODI match against the hosts, but in the second match both Taylor and Edwards were out for ducks in a heavy defeat for England. After the third match of the series was abandoned without any play, Taylor scored her first half-century of the tour, and shared a century partnership with Edwards to help England secure a 2–1 lead in the series, guaranteeing that they would at least draw the five-match contest. After Australia won the last ODI to tie the series, the two sides met at the Bradman Oval to play the only Test of the tour. Taylor and Edwards again enjoyed a successful partnership in England's first innings; Taylor scored 79 runs as the pair put on 159 together. She scored an unbeaten half-century in the second innings to help England to retain the Ashes.

Taylor carried her good form into the subsequent series against New Zealand, starting the second leg of their trip with a half-century against New Zealand A in a warm-up match in which she was acting captain. England struggled in the first ODI however: only Taylor and Edwards reached double figures for the tourists as they suffered a 123-run loss. In the following match, Taylor scored the seventh international century of her career, remaining 111 not out as England secured a nine-wicket win over New Zealand. She scored a half-century in the third ODI of the series, and 34 runs in the fifth to finish as England's leading run-scorer of the tour, scoring 342 runs at an average of 48.85 from the nine ODI matches in Australia and New Zealand.

Playing in the first match of Berkshire's County Championship campaign, Taylor scored 146 runs from 148 balls against Nottinghamshire, out of a team total of 212: no other Berkshire batsman scored more than 10 runs, and Nottinghamshire won by six wickets. In a two match ODI series against the West Indies she made minimal impact, but was described by Cricinfo as being "at her dominant best" in the first match of the subsequent series against South Africa. She struck 7 fours during her 70-ball innings and scored 83 runs. In the three remaining matches of the series, she made modest totals, before missing the Twenty20 Internationals due to illness. Taylor reached a landmark during the third series of the summer, making her 100th ODI appearance, against India. In the five-match series, which England won 4–0, Taylor remained not out in each of her three innings, scoring 125 runs. Following that series, the ICC introduced player rankings for women's ODI cricket, for which Taylor was top of the batsmen.

== Double world champions ==
In 2009, England participated in both the Women's Cricket World Cup, and the inaugural Women's World Twenty20. Taylor was identified as one of England's key players in a preview of the tournament, and she set up victory for England in their opening match against Sri Lanka with her eighth ODI century, her third in successive World Cup matches against Sri Lanka. She asserted her dominance once more in the second match, against India, scoring quicker than a run a ball for her 69 not out, to help England chase down a modest total in under 40 overs. Not required to bat against Pakistan, and dismissed for 19 against New Zealand, Taylor helped secure England's place in the final with a rapid 65 runs, including 2 sixes and 6 fours, against the West Indies. In England's final match of the group stages, Taylor top-scored with 49 runs in a dead rubber loss against Australia: Australia could not qualify for the final, and England were already through. In the final, having restricted New Zealand to 166, England were ahead of the required rate early. An early loss of wicket brought Taylor to the crease, and she played an attacking innings of 21, including 4 fours, before being bowled. England won the match by four wickets, to become ODI world champions. Taylor finished the tournament as the leading run-scorer, having made 324 runs, and her batting average was the highest amongst batsmen with over 100 runs. She was one of five England players to be named in the team of the tournament.

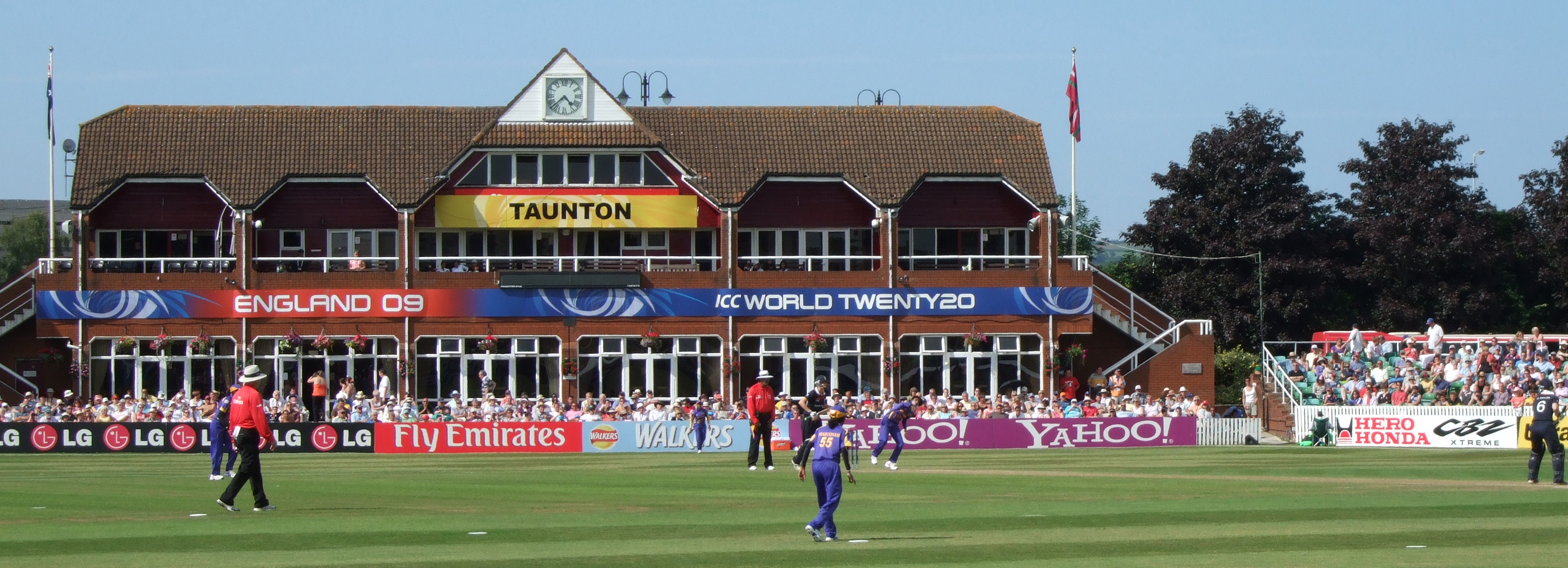
Taylor batting against Sri Lanka during the 2009 Women's World Twenty20

Taylor's next international action came during the inaugural Women's World Twenty20 tournament, held in England. Despite not being required to bat in England's opening match against India, she was the second most prolific batsmen in the competition, finishing with 199 runs, just one less than New Zealand's Aimee Watkins. In the group stage match against Sri Lanka, Taylor achieved her highest score in Twenty20 International cricket, making an unbeaten 75. Just five days later, she improved on that score, reaching 76 not out against Australia in the semi-finals. Batting with Beth Morgan, the pair maintained a run-rate of almost 10 runs an over to secure England's place in the final. Facing New Zealand in the final, England dismissed their opponents for 85 runs, but laboured to their total; Taylor top-scored for her side with 39 not out, and was the only England player to score a faster than a run a ball. Taylor was named as player of the tournament, and having only been dismissed once, finished with a batting average of 199.00. In England's subsequent series against Australia, Taylor struggled for runs, scoring 79 runs across four ODI innings, and being dismissed for under 20 runs in each innings of the only Test match. She opted to miss the tour of the West Indies in late 2009 to focus on her work commitments.

== Later career ==
Taylor returned to action for England in the 2010 Women's World Twenty20, hosted by the West Indies. England, and Taylor, struggled in the competition. Their only victory came against South Africa, after they had already been eliminated from the tournament. Taylor scored 24 runs in the tournament at an average of just 8.00. Later that summer, England hosted New Zealand. Taylor finished as England's leading run-scorer in the ODI series, scoring 166 runs at an average of 41.50, including half-centuries in two of the matches. In their next series, a tour of Sri Lanka, Taylor started strongly; scoring 73 runs in a narrow victory against their hosts, but failed to achieve double figures in an innings for the remainder of the tour. Taylor sustained a shoulder injury during the second warm-up match of their subsequent tour of Australia, which ruled her out of the rest of the visit.

Her injury had healed by the start of the 2011 season, but Taylor failed to make a significant impact on England's first two matches of the Twenty20 Quadrangular series, against New Zealand and Australia. In the third match however, ESPNcricinfo's Liam Brickhill claimed that she "roared back into form" with 66 runs from 46 balls to help England to a big win over India. England won the tournament, which was closely followed by an equivalent ODI Quadrangular. Taylor made at least 30 runs in three of her four innings of the tournament to finish among the top run-scorers in the series, which was also won by England. At the conclusion of the series, Taylor announced her retirement from international cricket. She finished her career with batting averages in excess of 40 in both Test and ODI cricket, and at the time of her retirement she trailed only Charlotte Edwards in ODI runs scored. She continued to represent Berkshire until the conclusion of the 2011 season.

== Playing style ==
During her teenage years, Taylor was considered a better hockey player than cricketer. When she began playing for Thames Valley, she was considered a wicket-keeper with no more than average batting ability. At university, she began to develop her batting, playing alongside the men for her college side. The different pace and strength required in the men's game meant that she had to learn to play off the back foot, in contrast to women's cricket, which is generally played off the front foot. After graduating from university in 1997, she made her international debut for England in 1998, but batted low in the order for England, having been picked as a wicket-keeper. Intent on improving her batting, she began one-on-one coaching with Mark Lane. At the time, it was unusual for a member of the England women's team to have individual coaching sessions, and Taylor had to pay for the meetings herself. When they began working together, Lane was critical of her batting; "She was just average, I would say." The sessions helped to improve Taylor's mental approach towards batting as well as making technical changes, though Lane promoted the use of bottom-handed hockey-style shots which came more naturally to Taylor. At her peak, she used her intelligence to help manipulate the field; in an interview she described that, "when I'm batting at my best I have a 3D awareness of the shape of the field and where the spaces are."

== Recognition ==
Taylor was the first woman to be selected as Wisden's Cricketer of the Year, in 2009. The editor of that years almanack, Scyld Berry, noted that "there is no element of political correctness or publicity-seeking about her selection," and that she had been "chosen on merit, for being pre-eminent in her form of the game." She was short-listed for the ICC Women's Cricketer of the Year in both 2007 and 2008, and won the award in 2009. She was also named as the England and Wales Cricket Board's Women's Player of the Year in May 2009. Continuing on from her success in 2009, Taylor was appointed a Member of the Order of the British Empire (MBE) on the 2010 New Year Honours list. During her career she topped the ICC batting rankings for both ODI and Twenty20 International cricket, and upon her retirement, former Test cricketer Mike Selvey suggested in The Guardian that she was "perhaps the finest batsman the women's game has seen."

== See also ==
- List of centuries in women's One Day International cricket
- List of centuries in women's Test cricket

== Bibliography ==
- Berry, Scyld (2009). Wisden Cricketers' Almanack 2009 (146 ed.). Alton, Hampshire: John Wisden & Co. Ltd. ISBN 978-1-905625-16-1.

Preceded by Charlotte Edwards	Women's Cricketer of the Year; 2009	Succeeded by Shelley Nitschke
