= 2009 Women's World Twenty20 =

Inaugural edition of the ICC Women's T20 World Cup

- Dates: 11 – 21 June 2009
- Administrator: International Cricket Council
- Cricket format: Women's Twenty20 International
- Tournament format(s): Group stage and Knockout
- Host: England
- Champions: England (1st title)
- Runners-up: New Zealand
- Participants: 8
- Matches: 15
- Player of the series: (England) Claire Taylor
- Most runs: (New Zealand) Aimee Watkins (200)
- Most wickets: (England) Holly Colvin (9)

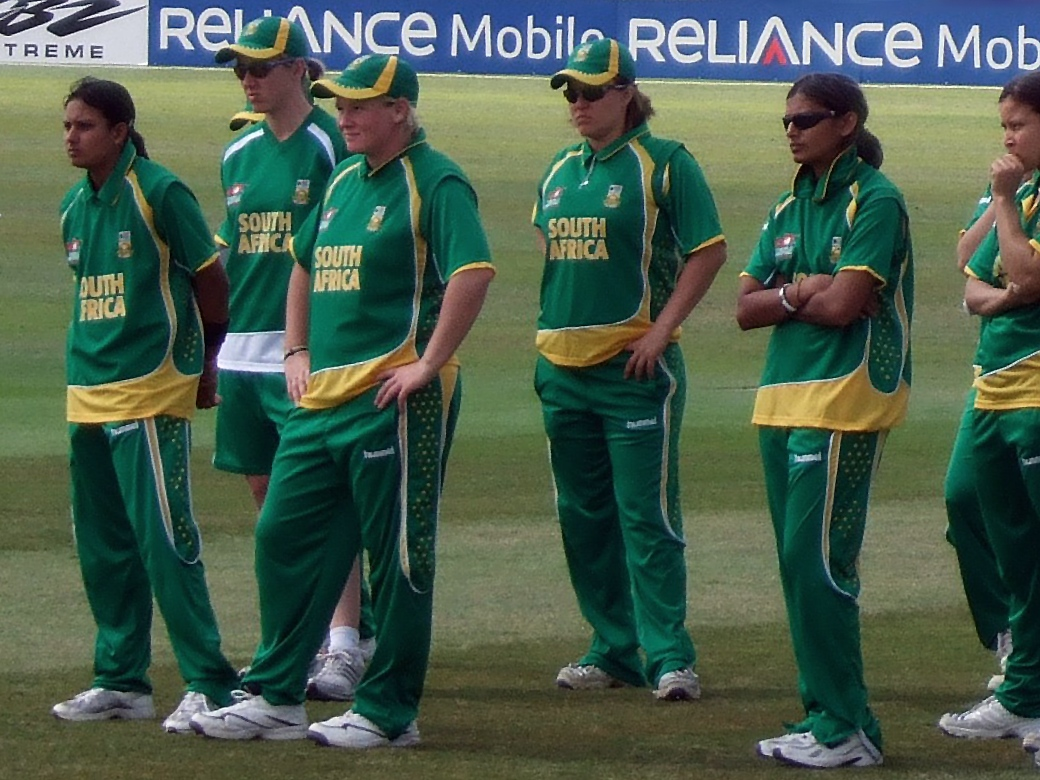
South Africa in the field during the tournament at the County Ground, Taunton.

The 2009 Women's World Twenty20 was the inaugural Women's World Twenty20 competition, taking place in England from 11 to 21 June 2009. All group stage matches were played at the County Ground in Taunton, with the semi-finals held at Trent Bridge and The Oval, and the final at Lord's. The tournament featured eight teams split into two groups.

England and New Zealand contested the final, with the host nation bowling out New Zealand for 85, helped by Player of the Match Katherine Brunt's opening spell of 3 for 6. Player of the Tournament Claire Taylor's 39* saw England home to a comfortable six wicket victory.

== Warm-up Games ==
Warm-Up Matches

8 June 2009
11:00 GMT

New Zealand; 122/8 (20 overs)	v	England; 126/3 (18.5 overs)

England won by 7 wickets
King's College Ground, Taunton
Umpires: SJ Davis (Australia) and M Erasmus (South Africa)

- Toss: England won the toss and elected to field

8 June 2009
11:00 GMT

South Africa; 118/3 (20 overs)	v	Sri Lanka; 92/8 (20 overs)

South Africa won by 26 runs
Taunton Vale Sports Club Ground, Taunton
Umpires: Aleem Dar (Pakistan) and MR Benson (England)

- Toss: South Africa won the toss and elected to bat.

8 June 2009
15:00 GMT

Australia	v	India

Match Abandoned
Taunton Vale Sports Club Ground, Taunton
Umpires: M Erasmus (South Africa) and AL Hill (New Zealand)

8 June 2009
15:00 GMT

Pakistan; 88/6 (14 overs)	v	West Indies; 114/4 (14 overs)

West Indies won by 26 runs
King's College Ground, Taunton
Umpires: Aleem Dar (Pakistan) and RE Koertzen (South Africa)

- Toss: West Indies won the toss and elected to bat.

9 June 2009
11:00 GMT

New Zealand; 123/5 (20 Overs)	v	India; 106/10(20 Overs)

New Zealand won by 17 runs
Taunton Vale Sports Club Ground, Taunton
Umpires: SJ Davis (Australia) and EAR De Silva (Sri Lanka)

- Toss: New Zealand won the toss and elected to bat.

9 June 2009
11:00 GMT

South Africa; 126/7 (20 Overs)	v	Pakistan; 90/10 (17.1 Overs)

South Africa won by 36 runs
King's College Ground, Taunton
Umpires: MR Benson (England) and RJ Tucker (Australia)

- Toss: Pakistan won the toss and elected to field.

9 June 2009
15:00 GMT

Australia; 141/5 (20 Overs)	v	England; 137/9 (20 Overs)

Australia won by 4 runs
Taunton Vale Sports Club Ground, Taunton
Umpires: EAR de Silva (Sri Lanks) and M Erasmus (South Africa)

- Toss: Australia won the toss and elected to bat.

9 June 2009
15:00 GMT

West Indies; 121/10 (19.5 Overs)	v	Sri Lanka; 81/8 (20 Overs)

West Indies won by 40 runs
King's College Ground, Taunton
Umpires: Aleem Dar (Pakistan) and RE Koertzen (South Africa)

- Toss: West Indies won the toss and elected to bat.

== Pool stage ==
=== Group A ===
==== Points Table ====
Pos	Team	Pld	W	L	T	NR	Pts	NRR
1	New Zealand	3	3	0	0	0	6	1.676
2	Australia	3	2	1	0	0	4	0.242
3	West Indies	3	1	2	0	0	2	−1.137
4	South Africa	3	0	3	0	0	0	−0.717

Source: ESPNCricinfo

==== Fixtures ====
11 June
11:00 BST
(scorecard)

West Indies; 123/7 (20 overs)	v	South Africa; 119 (19.4 overs)
Stafanie Taylor 50 (52); Shabnim Ismail 2/20 (4 overs)		Mignon du Preez 38 (33); Anisa Mohammed 2/16 (4 overs)

West Indies won by 4 runs
County Ground, Taunton
Umpires: Asad Rauf (PAK) & Amiesh Saheba (IND)
Player of the match: Stafanie Taylor (WI)

- Toss: West Indies won the toss and elected to bat.

12 June
11:00 BST
(scorecard)

Australia; 123/8 (20 overs)	v	New Zealand; 127/1 (16.2 overs)
Lisa Sthalekar 46 (38); Sian Ruck 3/12 (4 overs)		Aimee Watkins 73* (56); Lisa Sthalekar 0/18 (3.2 overs)

New Zealand won by 9 wickets
County Ground, Taunton
Umpires: Ian Gould (ENG) & Nigel Llong (ENG)
Player of the match: Sian Ruck (NZ)

- Toss: Australia won the toss and elected to bat.

13 June
11:00 BST
(scorecard)

New Zealand; 158/6 (20 overs)	v	West Indies; 106/7 (20 overs)
Suzie Bates 60 (39); Stafanie Taylor 2/25 (4 overs)		Stafanie Taylor 58 (56); Lucy Doolan 3/16 (4 overs)

New Zealand won by 52 runs
County Ground, Taunton
Umpires: Nigel Llong (ENG) & Simon Taufel (AUS)
Player of the match: Suzie Bates (NZ)

- Toss: New Zealand won the toss and elected to bat.

14 June
15:00 BST
(scorecard)

West Indies; 135/8 (20 overs)	v	Australia; 136/2 (17.2 overs)
Deandra Dottin 53 (25); Sarah Andrews 2/19 (4 overs)		Shelley Nitschke 56 (38); Cordel Jack 1/29 (4 overs)

Australia won by 8 wickets
County Ground, Taunton
Umpires: Asad Rauf (PAK) & Amiesh Saheba (IND)
Player of the match: Shelley Nitschke (Aus)

- Toss: West Indies won the toss and elected to bat.

15 June
11:00 BST
(scorecard)

South Africa; 124/4 (20 overs)	v	New Zealand; 127/4 (18.1 overs)
Cri-Zelda Brits 57* (51); Saskia Bullen 2/20 (4 overs)		Aimee Watkins 35 (28); Shabnim Ismail 2/26 (4 overs)

New Zealand won by 6 wickets
County Ground, Taunton
Umpires: Daryl Harper (AUS) & Amiesh Saheba (IND)
Player of the match: Cri-Zelda Brits (SA)

- Toss: New Zealand won the toss and elected to field.

16 June
15:00 BST
(scorecard)

Australia; 164/6 (20 overs)	v	South Africa; 140/7 (20 overs)
Karen Rolton 43 (33); Shabnim Ismail 3/27 (4 overs)		Shandre Fritz 39 (23); Shelley Nitschke 4/21 (4 overs)

Australia won by 24 runs
County Ground, Taunton
Umpires: Asoka De Silva (SL) & Tony Hill (NZ)
Player of the match: Shelley Nitschke (Aus)

- Toss: Australia won the toss and elected to bat.

=== Group B ===
==== Points Table ====
Pos	Team	Pld	W	L	T	NR	Pts	NRR
1	England	3	3	0	0	0	6	2.738
2	India	3	2	1	0	0	4	−0.025
3	Sri Lanka	3	1	2	0	0	2	−1.207
4	Pakistan	3	0	3	0	0	0	−1.481

Source: ESPNCricinfo

==== Fixtures ====
11 June
15:00 BST
(scorecard)

India; 112/8 (20 overs)	v	England; 113/0 (15.4 overs)
Mithali Raj 29 (37); Holly Colvin 3/20 (4 overs)		Charlotte Edwards 61* (53)

England won by 10 wickets
County Ground, Taunton
Umpires: Billy Doctrove (WI) & Daryl Harper (AUS)
Player of the match: Charlotte Edwards (Eng)

- Toss: India won the toss and elected to bat.

12 June
15:00 BST
(scorecard)

Pakistan; 104/7 (20 overs)	v	Sri Lanka; 105/6 (18.2 overs)
Bismah Maroof 50* (64); Eshani Kaushalya 3/16 (4 overs)		Inoka Galagedara 37 (41); Sajjida Shah 1/11 (1 over)

Sri Lanka won by 4 wickets
County Ground, Taunton
Umpires: Billy Bowden (NZ) & Nigel Llong (ENG)
Player of the match: Eshani Kaushalya (SL)

- Toss: Pakistan won the toss and elected to bat.

13 June
15:00 BST
(scorecard)

Pakistan; 75 all out (19.5 overs)	v	India; 78/5 (17.4 overs)
Nain Abidi 17 (18); Priyanka Roy 5/16 (3.5 overs)		Anjum Chopra 37* (52); Sana Mir 1/11 (4 overs)

India won by 5 wickets
County Ground, Taunton
Umpires: Billy Bowden (NZ) & Simon Taufel (AUS)
Player of the match: Priyanka Roy (Ind)

- Toss: Pakistan won the toss and elected to bat.

14 June
11:00 BST
(scorecard)

England; 140/7 (20 overs)	v	Sri Lanka; 68/8 (20 overs)
Claire Taylor 75 (54); Eshani Kaushalya 4/18 (4 overs)		Dilani Manodara 22* (40); Isa Guha 2/4 (4 overs)

England won by 72 runs
County Ground, Taunton
Umpires: Billy Doctrove (WI) & Daryl Harper (AUS)
Player of the match: Claire Taylor (Eng)

- Toss: England won the toss and elected to bat.

15 June
15:00 BST
(scorecard)

Sri Lanka; 94/6 (18 overs)	v	India; 95/5 (16.5 overs)
Deepika Rasangika 24* (20); Rumeli Dhar 2/4 (4 overs)		Mithali Raj 32* (22); Udeshika Prabodhani 1/13 (4 overs)

India won by 5 wickets
County Ground, Taunton
Umpires: Asad Rauf (PAK) & Billy Doctrove (NZ)
Player of the match: Mithali Raj (Ind)

- Toss: Sri Lanka won the toss and elected to bat.
  Match reduced to 18 overs per side.

16 June
11:00 BST
(scorecard)

England; 123 all out (20 overs)	v	Pakistan; 60 all out (16.5 overs)
Charlotte Edwards 43 (32); Urooj Mumtaz 2/26 (4 overs)		Bismah Maroof 13 (16); Holly Colvin 3/18 (4 overs)

England won by 63 runs
County Ground, Taunton
Umpires: Asoka De Silva (SL) & Tony Hill (NZ)
Player of the match: Charlotte Edwards (Eng)

- Toss: Pakistan won the toss and elected to field.

== Knockout stage ==
=== Semi-finals ===
18 June
12:30 BST
(scorecard)

New Zealand; 145/5 (20 overs)	v	India; 93/9 (20 overs)
Aimee Watkins 89* (58); Amita Sharma 2/21 (4 overs)		Amita Sharma 24 (27); Sian Ruck 2/18 (4 overs)

New Zealand won by 52 runs
Trent Bridge, Nottingham
Umpires: Asad Rauf (PAK) & Mark Benson (AUS)
Player of the match: Aimee Watkins (NZ)

- Toss: New Zealand won the toss and elected to bat.

19 June
12:30 BST
(scorecard)

Australia; 163/5 (20 overs)	v	England; 165/2 (19.3 overs)
Leah Poulton 39 (31); Laura Marsh 1/12 (4 overs)		Claire Taylor 76* (53); Rene Farrell 1/32 (4 overs); Ellyse Perry 1/32 (4 overs)

England won by 8 wickets
The Oval, London
Umpires: Billy Doctrove (WI) & Tony Hill (NZ)
Player of the match: Claire Taylor (Eng)

- Toss: England won the toss and elected to field.

=== Final ===
21 June
10:30 BST
(scorecard)

New Zealand; 85 (20 overs)	v	England; 86/4 (17 overs)
Amy Satterthwaite 19 (42); Katherine Brunt 3/6 (4 overs)		Claire Taylor 39 (32); Sophie Devine 1/12 (3 overs)

England won by 6 wickets
Lord's, London
Attendance: 12,717
Umpires: Aleem Dar (PAK) & Rudi Koertzen (SA)
Player of the match: Katherine Brunt (Eng)

- Toss: England won the toss and elected to field.

== Statistics ==
=== Most runs ===
Player	Matches	Runs	Average	HS
(New Zealand) Aimee Watkins	5	200	66.66	89*
(England) Claire Taylor	5	199	39.80	76*
(England) Charlotte Edwards	5	139	34.75	61*
(New Zealand) Suzie Bates	5	136	34.00	60
(Australia) Shelley Nitschke	4	130	32.50	56

=== Most wickets ===
Player	Matches	Wickets	Average	BBI
(England) Holly Colvin	5	9	11.77	3/18
(Sri Lanka) Eshani Kaushalya	3	8	6.87	4/18
(South Africa) Shabnim Ismail	3	7	10.42	3/27
(New Zealand) Sian Ruck	5	7	12.28	3/12
(India) Priyanka Roy	4	6	7.83	5/16

=== ICC Team of the Tournament ===
After the tournament's conclusion an ICC panel of experts picked the best composite XI from the players in the Women's World Twenty20.

1 Shelley Nitschke (Australia)

2 Charlotte Edwards (England)

3 Claire Taylor (England)

4 Aimee Watkins (New Zealand)

5 Sarah Taylor (England)

6 Suzie Bates (New Zealand)

7 Lucy Doolan (New Zealand)

8 Rumeli Dhar (India)

9 Holly Colvin (England)

10 Sian Ruck (New Zealand)

11 Laura Marsh (England)

12th man: Eshani Kaushalya (Sri Lanka)
