= Kibworth Cricket Club New Ground =

Cricket ground in Kibworth, Leicestershire, England

Coordinates: 52.5364°N 1.0081°W

Ground information
- Location: Kibworth, Leicestershire, England
- Establishment: 2006
- Capacity: n/a

International information
- First WODI: 4 July 2010: Ireland v New Zealand
- Last WODI: 7 July 2010: England v Ireland

Team information
Kibworth Cricket Club	(2005-present)
- As of 6 September 2020; Source: Ground profile

Kibworth Cricket Club New Ground is a cricket ground in Kibworth, Leicestershire, England. The ground replaced the original Kibworth Cricket Club Ground which was sold for development at the end of the 2005 season.

The New Ground is located directly next to the development which covers the old ground. The first match on the ground was in 2006, when Kibworth Cricket Club played a Leicestershire CCC XI as part of Darren Maddy's benefit year.

The Leicestershire Second XI played the Warwickshire Second XI in the grounds first Second XI Championship fixture in August 2010.

The ground held its first Women's One Day International in 2010 when Ireland women played New Zealand. Days later it held it second when England women played Ireland women.

The ground is the home venue of Kibworth Cricket Club. whose first XI play in the Leicestershire Premier Cricket League.

== Women's One Day International matches ==
The stadium has hosted following Women's ODI matches till date.

Team (A)	Team (B)	Winner	Margin	Year
Ireland	New Zealand	New Zealand	by 159 runs	2010
England	Ireland	England	by 147 runs	2010
