= Danielle Hazell =

English cricketer

Personal information
- Full name: Danielle Hazell
- Born: 13 May 1988 (age 38); Durham, County Durham, England
- Batting: Right-handed
- Bowling: Right-arm off break
- Role: Bowler

International information
- National side: England (2009–2018)
- Test debut (cap 148): 22 January 2011 v Australia
- Last Test: 10 January 2014 v Australia
- ODI debut (cap 114): 5 November 2009 v West Indies
- Last ODI: 12 April 2018 v India
- ODI shirt no.: 17
- T20I debut (cap 24): 9 November 2009 v West Indies
- Last T20I: 24 November 2018 v Australia
- T20I shirt no.: 17

Domestic team information
- Years: Team
- 2002–2007: Durham
- 2008–2018: Yorkshire
- 2016: Yorkshire Diamonds
- 2016/17: Melbourne Stars
- 2017–2018: Lancashire Thunder
- 2018: Trailblazers
- 2018/19: Adelaide Strikers

Career statistics
Competition	WTest	WODI	WT20I	WLA
Matches	3	53	85	157
Runs scored	28	361	188	2,200
Batting average	7.00	17.19	8.95	23.15
100s/50s	0/0	0/0	0/0	1/8
Top score	15	45	18*	100*
Balls bowled	390	2,613	1,905	6,944
Wickets	2	59	85	186
Bowling average	102.00	28.96	20.75	21.77
5 wickets in innings	0	0	0	4
10 wickets in match	0	–	–	–
Best bowling	2/32	4/32	4/12	6/16
Catches/stumpings	1/–	10/–	11/–	40/–
- Source: CricketArchive, 14 March 2021

Danielle Hazell (born 13 May 1988) is an English cricket coach and former player. She is currently the coach of English domestic team Durham Women. As a player she was an off break bowler who batted right-handed. She represented England in all three formats of the game, playing three Test matches, 53 One Day Internationals and 85 Twenty20 Internationals.

== Early life ==
Hazell was born on 13 May 1988 in Durham, County Durham.

== Domestic career ==
At county level Hazell initially played for Durham between 2002 and 2007, before moving to Yorkshire ahead of the 2008 season. She also played for V Team, Sapphires, Emeralds and Diamonds in the Super Fours competition. Hazell played for Yorkshire Diamonds in the inaugural season of the Women's Cricket Super League in 2016, before moving to Lancashire Thunder ahead of the 2017 season.

Hazell had two stints in the Women's Big Bash League, playing for Melbourne Stars in 2016/17 and Adelaide Strikers in 2018/19.

== International career ==
Hazell was a late inclusion in England's victorious 2009 World Twenty20 squad replacing the injured Anya Shrubsole, although she did not appear in the tournament. She made her England debut later that year in a One Day International against West Indies at Warner Park, Basseterre taking one wicket for 41 runs. She subsequently made her Twenty20 International debut against West Indies at the same ground and made four runs opening the batting.

She made her Test debut in the one-off Ashes Test at Bankstown Oval, Sydney in January 2011.

In 2013, she and Holly Colvin recorded a 9th wicket partnership of 33* against West Indies, which was a record for the 9th wicket in Women's Twenty20 Internationals until it was broken by Namibian players Dietlind Förster and Anneri van Schoor.

In 2014, she became one of the first 18 women cricketers to be awarded central contracts by the England and Wales Cricket Board.

On 15 November 2016, Hazell captained England for the first time in a One Day International against India after Heather Knight was ruled out through injury.

Hazell was a member of the England team that won the 2017 Women's Cricket World Cup, playing in five matches but missing out on the final.

In January 2019, Hazell announced her retirement from international cricket.

== Coaching career ==
After her retirement from playing, Hazell was named head coach of Yorkshire Diamonds ahead of the 2019 Women's Cricket Super League. She then became head coach of its successor team, Northern Diamonds, ahead of the 2020 Rachael Heyhoe Flint Trophy.
