= Holly Colvin =

English cricketer (born 1989)

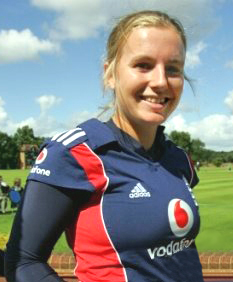
- Colvin playing against South Africa, August 2008.

Personal information
- Full name: Holly Louise Colvin
- Born: 7 September 1989 (age 37); Chichester, Sussex, England
- Batting: Right-handed
- Bowling: Left-arm orthodox spin
- Role: Bowler

International information
- National side: England (2005–2013)
- Test debut (cap 143): 9 August 2005 v Australia
- Last Test: 22 January 2011 v Australia
- ODI debut (cap 106): 14 August 2006 v India
- Last ODI: 3 November 2013 v West Indies
- T20I debut (cap 18): 10 August 2007 v South Africa
- Last T20I: 26 October 2013 v West Indies

Domestic team information
- Years: Team
- 2005–2015: Sussex

Career statistics
| Competition | WTest | WODI | WT20I | WLA |
|---|---|---|---|---|
| Matches | 5 | 72 | 50 | 157 |
| Runs scored | 59 | 180 | 91 | 874 |
| Batting average | 14.75 | 13.84 | 13.00 | 20.32 |
| 100s/50s | 0/0 | 0/0 | 0/0 | 0/2 |
| Top score | 21 | 29 | 18* | 58* |
| Balls bowled | 727 | 3,577 | 1,121 | 7,749 |
| Wickets | 13 | 98 | 63 | 257 |
| Bowling average | 29.38 | 21.80 | 15.41 | 14.84 |
| 5 wickets in innings | 0 | 0 | 0 | 10 |
| 10 wickets in match | 0 | 0 | 0 | 0 |
| Best bowling | 3/42 | 4/17 | 4/9 | 7/3 |
| Catches/stumpings | 1/– | 21/– | 19/– | 50/– |
- Source: CricketArchive, 14 March 2021

Holly Louise Colvin (born 7 September 1989) is an English former cricketer who played as a slow left-arm orthodox bowler and right-handed batter. She appeared in five Test matches, 72 One Day Internationals and 50 Twenty20 Internationals for England between 2005 and 2013.

== Playing career ==
=== School level ===
Born in Chichester, Colvin attended the nearby Westbourne House School. A right-hand bat and slow left arm bowler, she originally played as a batter and started playing for the 1st XI in year 7 and soon averaged over 100. After Westbourne House, Colvin followed in the footsteps of England women's captain Clare Connor by playing in the boys' team at Brighton College. Competing in the Lord's Taverners under-15 Cup in 2004, Colvin and fellow Brightonian Sarah Taylor were the only girls among the 1,000 participating teams. Colvin and Taylor's involvement in the competition caused controversy within the Marylebone Cricket Club (MCC), with president Robin Marlar calling their inclusion "absolutely outrageous". He proceeded to argue that, "if there's an 18-year-old who can bowl at 80mph and he's been brought up properly then he shouldn't want to hurt a lady at any cost". Richard Cairns, headmaster of Brighton College, dismissed the comments as "show[ing] a huge generation gap"; Colvin herself commented that "we just thought it was funny... [they] don't treat me any different. They bowl at me just as fast and hit the ball just as hard". On a cricket tour to Sri Lanka in December 2004, she was one of the last people to play at the Galle International Stadium before it was flattened by the tsunami of Boxing Day that year. In December 2006, Colvin was named as 'Female Pupil of the Year' by The Telegraph's 'School Sport Matters' campaign, receiving the award at Lord's from Olympic gold-medallist Kelly Holmes.

=== County level ===
Colvin played for Sussex from May 2005 to September 2015. She was part of the Sussex teams that won the women's County Championship in 2005, and again in 2008. The West Sussex Cricket League has named a trophy after her, awarded annually to the most-improved young female cricketer in the county.

=== International ===
Colvin's first involvement with international cricket came in August 2005, when the England team was preparing to face the Australian women's international team at the Hove County Cricket Ground. She was invited to bowl against the English team in the nets to give them practice against a left-arm spinner, who the Australian team was fielding in the form of Shelley Nitschke. After the practice session, Colvin was asked to be available for the four-day match by team coach Richard Bates. Team captain Clare Connor admitted that her inclusion was "pure hunch", believing that the dry, dusty wicket would be favourable to spin bowling. Bates explained to The Times that "the pitch [was] a little worn, and we felt that Holly could help us exploit it". Colvin made her England debut on 9 August 2005, becoming at 15 years and 336 days the youngest cricketer (of either sex) to play Test cricket for England. She took three wickets in her inaugural game, dismissing Kate Blackwell and Julia Price in two consecutive balls and nearly taking Julie Hayes for a hat-trick. Reminiscing over the experience in February 2008, Colvin remarked that "I think I was fortunate... I had no idea who I was playing against – all these big names that were coming up against me and I had pretty much no idea". She described her near-hat-trick as a "pretty special [moment]".

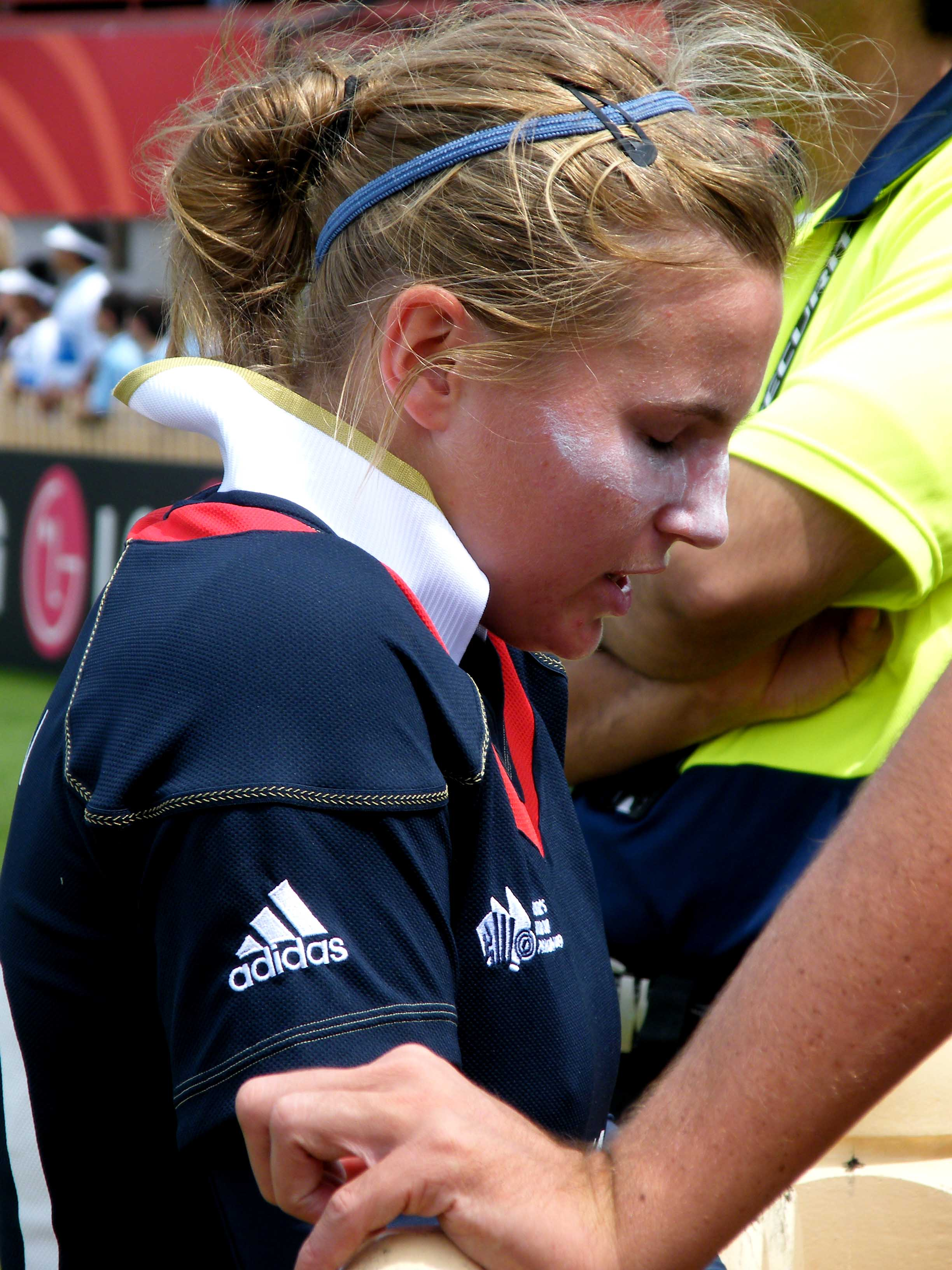
Colvin signing autographs during the 2009 Women's Cricket World Cup.

Although Bates said that "she might have to wait a few years before she gets another chance [to play for England]", Colvin became a regular member of England's international teams. By August 2007, she had two Test matches and eleven One Day Internationals to her credit. In the Women's Quadrangular Series in India in 2006, Colvin took three wickets for 47 against New Zealand, and then 3 for 50 in the 3rd–4th playoff to secure the England team 3rd place.

On 10 August 2007, Colvin took a wicket and two catches in her inaugural Twenty20 International match, against South Africa at Taunton. Despite being the smallest member of the squad – a photograph published by the BBC shows her fitting comfortably inside a cricket bag – she proved her worth in the subsequent three-match T20I series against New Zealand, taking wickets in both games that she played.

In February 2008, Colvin played her third international Test match, on tour in Australia, as part of the England Women's Team defending the Ashes won in 2005. Colvin admitted that she felt "a little under pressure" before the one-match series; England had not won the Women's Ashes for 42 years prior to the victory in 2005. She claimed that the team were "definitely looking to win... we've got more to lose". The England Team won the match by six wickets, successfully retaining the Ashes trophy. Colvin set a new personal best for Test matches, taking three for 42 during the second innings. Her best bowling analysis in ODI cricket was exceeded on 1 September 2008 when she took 4 for 20 against India in the second match of the series at Taunton.

She was an integral part of the England attack during the 2009 Women's Cricket World Cup, taking 9 wickets at 18 in the competition and hitting the winning runs in a tense finish in the final against New Zealand. She was the highest wicket taker, with nine for 106, in the inaugural Women's World Twenty20 in England in 2009.

Colvin took an indefinite break from cricket in 2013 and announced her official retirement from the international game in 2015 after being appointed as ICC women's cricket senior officer.

== Personal life ==
Colvin gained 10 A* grades in her GCSEs, three As in AS-level exams, and 4 As in her A-levels. In 2009, she started studying natural sciences at Durham University, to which is attached one of England's six University Centres of Cricketing Excellence.

After retiring from playing aged 32, Colvin worked as Sports Competition Manager for Cricket at the 2022 Commonwealth Games in Birmingham.
