= Australia women's cricket team in England in 1963 =

Australian women's cricket team in England in 1963
	England	Australia
- Dates: 20 May – 8 August 1963
Captains	Mary Duggan	Mary Allitt

Test series
- Result: England won the 3-match series 1–0
Most runs	Mary Duggan (195)	Hazel Buck (169)
Most wickets	Mary Duggan (15)	Miriam Knee (16)

The Australian women's cricket team toured England between May and August 1963. The test series against England women's cricket team was played for the Women's Ashes, which Australia were defending. England won the series 1–0, winning the third test, therefore regaining the Ashes.

== Squads ==
England	Australia
Mary Duggan (c); Edna Barker; June Bragger; Sandra Brown; Shirley Driscoll; Jacqueline Elledge; Helene Hegarty; Rachael Heyhoe Flint; Dorothy Macfarlane; Mary Pilling; Cecilia Robinson; Anne Sanders; Eileen Vigor; Ruth Westbrook (wk)	Mary Allitt (c); Liz Amos; Shirley Banfield; Hazel Buck; Lynn Denholm; Joyce Goldsmith; Margaret Jude (wk); Miriam Knee; Lorraine Kutcher; Helen Lee; Marjorie Marvell; Janice Parker; Muriel Picton; Patricia Thomson; Coralie Towers; Norma Wilson (wk)

== Tour Matches ==
=== 1-day single innings matches ===
20 May 1963
Scorecard

Australia; 222/3d (70 overs)	v	Western Counties; 90 (52.2 overs)
Mary Allitt 118* (–); Kay Green 2/52 (21 overs)		A Beaufoy 20 (–); Patricia Thomson 4/33 (18.2 overs)

Australia Women won by 132 runs
Recreation Ground, Torquay
Umpires: Doris Turner (Eng) and Anne Flann (Eng)

- Western Counties Women won the toss and elected to field.

30 May 1963
Scorecard

West Midlands; 151/6d (67.1 overs)	v	Australia; 152/0 (40.4 overs)
June Howard 79 (–); Muriel Picton 1/11 (9 overs)		Janice Parker 91* (102)

Australia Women won by 10 wickets
Danescourt, Wolverhampton
Umpires: Isabel Nowell-Smith (Eng) and Betty Snowball (Eng)

- Australia Women won the toss and elected to field.

6 June 1963
Scorecard

Australia; 193/3d (62.4 overs)	v	East Midlands; 60 (32.4 overs)
Shirley Banfield 55 (–); S Lloyd 1/13 (6 overs)		P Richardson 20 (–); Miriam Knee 3/15 (9 overs)

Australia Women won by 133 runs
Plains Road, Mapperley
Umpires: HM Bond (Eng) and P Greenwood (Eng)

- East Midlands Women won the toss and elected to field.

12 June 1963
Scorecard

Northern Counties; 152/9d (57 overs)	v	Australia; 153/6 (57.1 overs)
Margaret Rutherford 49 (–); Lorraine Kutcher 4/34 (19 overs)		Liz Amos 35 (–); Dorothy Macfarlane 5/62 (29 overs)

Australia Women won by 4 wickets
Trafalgar Road Ground, Southport
Umpires: D Elleray (Eng) and Margaret Lockwood (Eng)

- Australia Women won the toss and elected to field.

22 June 1963
Scorecard

Yorkshire; 122 (51.3 overs)	v	Australia; 125/4 (45.3 overs)
Sue Hilliam 58 (–); Patricia Thomson 6/16 (10.3 overs)		Lynn Denholm 78* (–); June Stephenson 2/29 (11.3 overs)

Australia Women won by 6 wickets
Headingley Cricket Ground, Leeds
Umpires: Ora Carse (Eng) and Barbara Wood (Eng)

- Australia Women won the toss and elected to field.

26 June 1963
Scorecard

East Anglia; 96 (50.3 overs)	v	Australia; 99/2 (31.1 overs)
Jean Lillico 17 (–); Miriam Knee 4/16 (7.3 overs)		Hazel Buck 34 (–); S Hughes 1/20 (6 overs)

Australia Women won by 8 wickets
Fenner's, Cambridge
Umpires: Doris Turner (Eng) and Elizabeth Riley (Eng)

- Australia Women won the toss and elected to field.

10 July 1963
Scorecard

Australia; 175/3d (51 overs)	v	Kent; 120/8 (43 overs)
Hazel Buck 102* (–); Jacqueline Elledge 2/29 (13 overs)		Mary Pilling 29 (–); Miriam Knee 2/22 (13 overs)

Match drawn
Vine Cricket Ground, Sevenoaks
Umpires: Iris Doble (Eng) and Elizabeth Riley (Eng)

- Kent Women won the toss and elected to field.

17 July 1963
Scorecard

Australia; 177/2d (50.1 overs)	v	Sussex; 127/7 (59 overs)
Hazel Buck 80* (–); W Dearsley 1/43 (15 overs)		W Dearsley 67* (–); Joyce Goldsmith 2/4 (7 overs)

Match drawn
Manor Sports Ground, Worthing
Umpires: Doris Turner (Eng) and Iris Doble (Eng)

- Sussex Women won the toss and elected to field.

25 July 1963
Scorecard

Combined Services; 120/5d (72 overs)	v	Australia; 121/0 (33.1 overs)
Myrtle Maclagan 81* (–); Joyce Goldsmith 2/17 (15 overs)		Janice Parker 69* (–)

Australia Women won by 10 wickets
Officers Club Services Ground, Aldershot
Umpires: Doris Turner (Eng) and Isabel Nowell-Smith (Eng)

- Australia Women won the toss and elected to field.

31 July 1963
Scorecard

Surrey; 129 (54 overs)	v	Australia; 132/1 (33.3 overs)
Marjorie Adam 40 (–); Muriel Picton 5/25 (12 overs)		Lynn Denholm 66 (–)

Australia Women won by 9 wickets
Mitcham Cricket Green, Mitcham
Umpires: Enid Stevenson (Eng) and Sylvia Swinburne (Eng)

- Australia Women won the toss and elected to field.

5 August 1963
Scorecard

Middlesex; 180 (64.2 overs)	v	Australia; 152/8 (54 overs)
Diana Brickell 58 (–); Miriam Knee 7/54 (18.2 overs)		Hazel Buck 75* (–); Mary Duggan 6/37 (21 overs)

Match drawn
Headstone Lane Staff Association Sports Ground, Harrow
Umpires: Jane Ayres (Eng) and May Howard (Eng)

- Australia Women won the toss and elected to field.

8 August 1963
Scorecard

Buckinghamshire, Berkshire and Oxfordshire	v	Australia

Match abandoned
Chalvey Road, Slough

- No toss.
- No play possible due to rain.

=== 2-day matches ===
25, 27 May 1963
Scorecard

Australia	v	West of England
246/9d (76 overs); Hazel Buck 81 (–); Pam Trosh 2/31 (14 overs)		97 (52.1 overs); Budge Stuart-Smith 25 (–); Lorraine Kutcher 4/19 (12 overs)
		74 (41.1 overs) (f/o); Pam Trosh 33 (–); Muriel Picton 3/0 (1 over)

Australia Women won by an innings and 75 runs
County Ground, Taunton
Umpires: Peggy Culver (Eng) and May Howard (Eng)

- West of England Women won the toss and elected to field.

1, 3 June 1963
Scorecard

Australia	v	Midlands
304/3d (96 overs); Liz Amos 106* (–); P Richardson 1/27 (9 overs)		176 (89 overs); Rachael Heyhoe Flint 75 (–); Miriam Knee 2/33 (20 overs)
		102/4 (52 overs) (f/o); Rachael Heyhoe Flint 47* (–); Liz Amos 2/14 (3 overs)

Match drawn
Bournville Cricket Ground, Birmingham
Umpires: V Cox (Eng) and Doris Turner (Eng)

- Midlands Women won the toss and elected to field.

8, 10 June 1963
Scorecard

Australia	v	North of England
124 (94.4 overs); Norma Wilson 63 (–); Dorothy Macfarlane 5/46 (36.4 overs)		84 (48 overs); Sue Hilliam 23 (–); Marjorie Marvell 7/10 (18 overs)
133/2d (46 overs); Mary Allitt 71* (–); Polly Marshall 1/17 (5 overs)		75/4 (46 overs); J Harkness 36* (–); Patricia Thomson 2/11 (8 overs)

Match drawn
Osborne Avenue, Jesmond
Umpires: Ora Carse (Eng) and Isabel Nowell-Smith (Eng)

- North of England Women won the toss and elected to field.

6, 8 July 1963
Scorecard

East of England	v	Australia
18/0d (9.1 overs); Jacqueline Elledge 10* (–)		8/1d (3.1 overs); Lynn Denholm 8 (–); Val Hesmondhalgh 1/5 (1.1 overs)
145/5d (68.3 overs); Ruth Westbrook 61 (–); Muriel Picton 3/17 (8.3 overs)		97/4 (42 overs); Margaret Jude 46 (–); Mary Pilling 2/25 (12 overs)

Match drawn
Wardown Park, Luton
Umpires: P Greenwood (Eng) and May Howard (Eng)

- East of England Women won the toss and elected to field.

13, 15 July 1963
Scorecard

Australia	v	South of England
191 (91 overs); Helen Lee 44* (–); Helene Hegarty 4/74 (33 overs)		92/6d (51 overs); Sandra Brown 24 (–); Marjorie Marvell 3/20 (18 overs)
24/5d (23.3 overs); Lynn Denholm 10 (–); Joan Hawes 2/14 (8 overs)		119/6 (39 overs); Shirley Driscoll 68* (–); Lorraine Kutcher 2/27 (10 overs)

Match drawn
Central Recreation Ground, Hastings
Umpires: Doris Turner (Eng) and Sylvia Swinburne (Eng)

- South of England Women won the toss and elected to field.

27, 29 July 1963
Scorecard

Australia	v	England Women Australia Touring Team
277 (93 overs); Muriel Picton 97 (–); Mary Duggan 5/55 (25 overs)		189/5d (63 overs); Ruth Westbrook 74* (–); Patricia Thomson 2/35 (14 overs)
111/3d (32.5 overs); Janice Parker 52* (–); Polly Marshall 1/24 (32.5 overs)		63 (34 overs); Ruth Westbrook 16 (–); Lorraine Kutcher 4/24 (13 overs)

Australia Women won by 136 runs
Dane Park, Margate
Umpires: Doris Turner (Eng) and Netta Rheinberg (Eng)

- Australia Women won the toss and elected to bat.

== Test Series ==
=== 1st Test ===
15 – 19 June 1963
Scorecard

Australia	v	England
173 (84.4 overs); Hazel Buck 47 (–); Mary Duggan 4/39 (20 overs)		196 (105.4 overs); Sandra Brown 57* (–); Miriam Knee 4/49 (25.4 overs)
223/5d (124 overs); Janice Parker 50 (–); June Bragger 2/21 (11 overs)		91/3 (42 overs); Jacqueline Elledge 51*; Janice Parker 1/10 (6 overs)

Match drawn
Edgbaston Cricket Ground, Birmingham
Umpires: May Howard (Eng) and Peggy Culver (Eng)

- Australia Women won the toss and elected to bat.
- June Bragger, Sandra Brown, Jacqueline Elledge, Mary Pilling, Eileen Vigor (Eng), Hazel Buck, Lynn Denholm, Lorraine Kutcher and Janice Parker (Aus) all made their WTest debuts.

=== 2nd Test ===
29 June – 3 July 1963
Scorecard

England	v	Australia
167 (86.4 overs); Mary Duggan 44 (–); Miriam Knee 5/35 (23 overs)		276 (132 overs); Miriam Knee 82 (–); Dorothy Macfarlane 3/46 (26 overs)
93/9 (92 overs); Rachael Heyhoe Flint 26 (–); Miriam Knee 3/22 (29 overs)

Match drawn
North Marine Road Ground, Scarborough
Umpires: Doris Turner (Eng) and Isabel Nowell-Smith (Eng)

- England Women won the toss and elected to bat.
- Helen Lee (Aus) made her WTest debut.

=== 3rd Test ===
20 – 24 July 1963
Scorecard

England	v	Australia
254/8d (89 overs); Mary Duggan 101* (–); Lorraine Kutcher 5/59 (24 overs)		205 (113.2 overs); Liz Amos 55 (–); Anne Sanders 4/29 (20.2 overs)
160/7d (58.3 overs); Rachael Heyhoe Flint 37* (–); Miriam Knee 3/53 (23 overs)		160 (89.2 overs); Lynn Denholm 29 (–); Mary Duggan 3/40 (27 overs)

England Women won by 49 runs
The Oval, London
Umpires: P Greenwood (Eng) and Sylvia Swinburne (Eng)

- England Women won the toss and elected to bat.
- Margaret Jude (Aus) made her WTest debut.
- Rachael Heyhoe Flint hit the first six in Women's Tests.
