= Victoria women's cricket team =

Women's representative cricket team

Victoria

Personnel
- Captain: Meg Lanning
- Coach: Jarrad Loughman

Team information
- Colours: Navy blue White; Grey
- Founded: First recorded match: 1891
- Home ground: Junction Oval, Melbourne
- Capacity: 7,000
- Secondary home ground(s): Shepley Oval, Melbourne

History
- First-class debut: New South Wales in 1934 at University Oval, Sydney
- AWCC wins: 36
- WNCL wins: 2
- WT20C wins: 3
- Official website: Victorian Cricket Team

The Victoria women's cricket team, previously known as Victorian Spirit, is the women's representative cricket team for the Australian State of Victoria. They play their home games at Junction Oval, St Kilda, a suburb of Melbourne. They compete in the Women's National Cricket League (WNCL), the premier 50-over women's cricket tournament in Australia. They previously played in the now-defunct Australian Women's Twenty20 Cup and Australian Women's Cricket Championships, a competition which they dominated, having won 36 titles.

== History ==
=== 1891–1930: Early history ===
Victoria's first recorded match was against New South Wales on 17 March 1891, however, the result is unknown. Their first match with a known result was against New South Wales Second XI, with Victoria winning a one-day, two innings match by 6 wickets on 19 April 1930.

=== 1931–1996: Australian Women's Cricket Championships ===
Victoria played alongside New South Wales and Queensland in the inaugural season of the Australian Women's Cricket Championships in 1930–31. They continued to play in the Championships until its final season in 1995–96. They won the title 36 times, making them the most successful team.

=== 1996–present: Women's National Cricket League and Twenty20 Cup ===
Victoria joined the newly established WNCL in 1996–97. They have won the title twice, in 2002–03 and 2004–05. They are the most successful side in the Australian Women's Twenty20 Cup, having won the title three times, with consecutive wins coming in 2009–10, 2010–11 and 2011–12

== Grounds ==
Victoria have used a number of grounds over the years. Their first recorded home match against Tasmania in 1906 was played at Victoria Park, Melbourne. Historically they have played the vast majority of their home matches at various grounds in Melbourne. Their first match at the Melbourne Cricket Ground was against England in 1934. Since 2002 they have also played occasional matches in Geelong.

Since 2013, Victoria have played most of their home games at Junction Oval, located in the suburb of St Kilda in Melbourne, as well as occasionally at the Melbourne Cricket Ground and Casey Fields. Their two 2019–20 WNCL home games were played at Junction Oval. Their four 2020–21 WNCL league matches, as well as the final, were also played at Junction Oval. In 2021–22, they played six matches at Junction Oval, as well as playing their first ever match at Shepley Oval in Melbourne. In 2022–23, the side returned to just using Junction Oval.

== Players ==
=== Current squad ===
Based on squad announced for the 2023/24 season. Players in bold have international caps.

No.	Name	Nat.	Birth date	Batting style	Bowling style	Notes
Batters
27	Olivia Henry	(Australia)	27 January 2004 (age 22)	Right-handed	Right-arm off break	
7	**Meg Lanning**	(Australia)	25 March 1992 (age 34)	Right-handed	Right-arm medium	Captain, Cricket Australia contract, former Australia Captain
All-rounders
25	Tess Flintoff	(Australia)	31 March 2003 (age 23)	Right-handed	Right-arm medium	
11	**Kim Garth**	(Australia) (Note: Garth has also played international cricket for Ireland.)	25 April 1996 (age 30)	Right-handed	Right-arm medium	
18	Ella Hayward	(Australia)	8 September 2003 (age 22)	Right-handed	Right-arm off break	
8	Rhys McKenna	(Australia)	17 August 2004 (age 21)	Right-handed	Right-arm fast-medium	
23	**Sophie Molineux**	(Australia)	17 January 1998 (age 28)	Left-handed	Slow left-arm orthodox	Cricket Australia contract
20	**Ellyse Perry**	(Australia)	3 November 1990 (age 35)	Right-handed	Right-arm fast-medium	Cricket Australia contract
3	**Annabel Sutherland**	(Australia)	12 October 2001 (age 24)	Right-handed	Right-arm medium-fast	Cricket Australia contract
32	**Georgia Wareham**	(Australia)	26 May 1999 (age 27)	Right-handed	Right-arm leg break	Cricket Australia contract
Wicket-keepers
4	Nicole Faltum	(Australia)	17 January 2000 (age 26)	Right-handed	Right-arm leg break	
22	Sophie Reid	(Australia)	28 August 1997 (age 28)	Left-handed	–	
Bowlers
6	Sophie Day	(Australia)	2 September 1998 (age 27)	Left-handed	Slow left-arm orthodox	
–	Poppy Gardner	(Australia)	5 January 2005 (age 21)	Right-handed	Left-arm medium	
–	Hasrat Gill	(Australia)	9 November 2005 (age 20)	Right-handed	Right-arm leg break	
21	Milly Illingworth	(Australia)	15 July 2005 (age 20)	Right-handed	Right-arm medium	
–	Sasha Moloney	(Australia)	14 June 1992 (age 34)	Right-handed	Right-arm off break	
28	Jasmine Nevins	(Australia)	7 October 2003 (age 22)	Right-handed	Right-arm medium	
16	Georgia Prestwidge	(Australia)	17 December 1997 (age 28)	Right-handed	Right-arm medium	
17	**Tayla Vlaeminck**	(Australia)	27 October 1998 (age 27)	Right-handed	Right-arm fast	Cricket Australia contract

=== Notable players ===
Players who have played for Victoria and played internationally are listed below, in order of first international appearance (given in brackets):

- (Australia) Nell McLarty (1934)
- (Australia) Kath Smith (1934)
- (Australia) Hilda Hills (1934)
- (Australia) Lorna Kettels (1934)
- (Australia) Anne Palmer (1934)
- (Australia) Peggy Antonio (1934)
- (Australia) Winnie George (1937)
- (Australia) Elsie Deane (1937)
- (Australia) Joan Schmidt (1948)
- (Australia) Una Paisley (1948)
- (Australia) Betty Wilson (1948)
- (Australia) Lorna Beal (1948)
- (Australia) Myrtle Edwards (1948)
- (Australia) Myrtle Baylis (1948)
- (Australia) Alma Vogt (1949)
- (England) Joan Wilkinson (1949)
- (Australia) Valma Batty (1951)
- (Australia) Eileen Massey (1957)
- (Australia) Joyce Bath (1957)
- (Australia) Nell Massey (1958)
- (Australia) Norma Wilson (1961)
- (Australia) Liz Amos (1961)
- (Australia) Miriam Knee (1961)
- (Australia) Lynn Denholm (1963)
- (Australia) Janice Parker (1963)
- (Australia) Lorraine Kutcher (1963)
- (New Zealand) Betty Maker (1966)
- (Australia) Elaine Bray (1968)
- (Australia) Joyce Goldsmith (1968)
- (Australia) Anne Gordon (1968)
- (Australia) Shirley Banfield (1972)
- (Australia) Dawn Rae (1972)
- (Australia) Margaret Jennings (1972)
- (Australia) Lesley Johnston (1972)
- (Australia) Raelee Thompson (1972)
- (Australia) Sharon Tredrea (1973)
- (Australia) Cathy Garlick (1973)
- (Australia) Lorraine Hill (1973)
- (Australia) Valerie Farrell (1973)
- (Australia) Janette Tredrea (1976)
- (Australia) Christine White (1977)
- (Australia) Sharyn Hill (1978)
- (Australia) Jen Jacobs (1979)
- (Australia) Lee Albon (1982)
- (Australia) Christina Matthews (1984)
- (Australia) Wendy Napier (1985)
- (Australia) Karen Brown (1985)
- (Australia) Sharlene Heywood (1986)
- (Australia) Ruth Buckstein (1986)
- (Australia) Zoe Goss (1987)
- (Australia) Kerry Saunders (1988)
- (Australia) Melissa Papworth (1990)
- (Australia) Belinda Clark (1991)
- (Australia) Cathryn Fitzpatrick (1991)
- (Australia) Charmaine Mason (1992)
- (Australia) Julie Calvert (1993)
- (Australia) Kim Bradley (1994)
- (Australia) Stephanie Theodore (1995)
- (Australia) Mel Jones (1997)
- (Australia) Jane Franklin (1998)
- (Australia) Megan White (1999)
- (Australia) Clea Smith (2000)
- (Australia) Louise Broadfoot (2000)
- (Australia) Sarah Elliott (2005)
- (Australia) Ellyse Perry (2007)
- (Australia) Jess Duffin (2009)
- (Australia) Elyse Villani (2009)
- (Australia) Rachael Haynes (2009)
- (Australia) Julie Hunter (2010)
- (England) Danni Wyatt (2010)
- (Ireland) (Australia) Kim Garth (2010) (Note: Garth has represented both Ireland and Australia in international cricket.)
- (Australia) Meg Lanning (2010)
- (Australia) Annie Maloney (2011)
- (Australia) Nicole Bolton (2014)
- (New Zealand) Hayley Jensen (2014)
- (Australia) Kristen Beams (2014)
- (Ireland) Una Raymond-Hoey (2016)
- (Australia) Molly Strano (2017)
- (Australia) Sophie Molineux (2018)
- (Australia) Georgia Wareham (2018)
- (Australia) Tayla Vlaeminck (2018)
- (Australia) Annabel Sutherland (2020)
- (Australia) Alana King (2022)

== Coaching staff ==
- Head coach: Jarrad Loughman
- Assistant coach: Dulip Samaraweera
- Head of Female Cricket: Sharelle McMahon

== Honours ==
- Australian Women's Cricket Championships:
  - Winners (36): 1933–34, 1934–35, 1935–36, 1938–39, 1939–40, 1946–47, 1947–48, 1948–49, 1949–50, 1952–53, 1953–54, 1954–55, 1955–56, 1956–57, 1959–60, 1960–61, 1963–64, 1964–65, 1965–66, 1966–67, 1967–68, 1969–70, 1970–71, 1972–73, 1973–74, 1975–76, 1976–77, 1977–78, 1978–79, 1980–81, 1981–82, 1982–83, 1985–86, 1987–88, 1990–91, 1995–96
- Women's National Cricket League:
  - Winners (2): 2002–03, 2004–05
- Australian Women's Twenty20 Cup:
  - Winners (3): 2009–10, 2010–11, 2011–12

== See also ==
- Cricket in Victoria
- Cricket Victoria
- Victoria men's cricket team
- Melbourne Stars (WBBL)
- Melbourne Renegades (WBBL)
