= Australia women's cricket team in New Zealand in 1960–61 =

Australian women's cricket team

	New Zealand	Australia
- Dates: 18 February – 24 March 1961
Captains	Rona McKenzie	Muriel Picton

Test series
- Result: 1-match series drawn 0–0
Most runs	Rona McKenzie (71)	Liz Amos (55)
Most wickets	Eris Paton (6)	Miriam Knee (4)

The Australia women's national cricket team toured New Zealand in February and March 1961. They played against New Zealand in one Test match, which was drawn.

== Squads ==
New Zealand	Australia
Rona McKenzie (c); Loretta Bayliss; Phyl Blackler; Pat Moore; Eris Paton; Joyce Powell (wk); Daphne Robinson; Betty Sinclair; Jean Stonell; Betty Thorner; Mary Webb	Muriel Picton (c); Mary Allitt; Liz Amos; Valma Batty; Joyce Christ; Miriam Knee; Marjorie Marvell; Una Paisley; Kit Raymond; Patricia Thomson; Norma Wilson (wk)

== Tour Matches ==
=== 2-day match: Auckland v Australia ===
18, 20 February 1961
Scorecard

Auckland	v	Australia
258 (115.3 overs); Joyce Powell 93 (–); Muriel Picton 3/41 (14 overs)		249/9 (128 overs); Joyce Christ 74 (–); Val Stevens 4/58 (48 overs)

Match drawn
Melville Park, Auckland

- Auckland Women won the toss and chose to bat.

=== 1-day match: Matamata and Hamilton v Australia ===
22 February 1961
Scorecard

Matamata and Hamilton	v	Australia
54 (50 overs); Joyce Powell 28 (–); Marjorie Marvell 5/6 (14 overs)		117/5d (32 overs); Una Paisley 36 (–); Val Stevens 4/58 (48 overs)
41 (33.3 overs); Joy Tristram 17 (–); Marjorie Marvell 4/6 (13 overs)

Australia Women won by an innings and 22 runs
Bedford Park, Matamata

- Matamata and Hamilton Women won the toss and chose to bat.

=== 1-day match: Wanganui v Australia ===
25 February 1961
Scorecard

Wanganui	v	Australia
43 (27 overs); Annette Crafar 22 (–); Miriam Knee 5/8 (6 overs)		140/3d (40 overs); Norma Wilson 56 (–); Annette Crafar 1/27 (7 overs)
71 (44 overs); Brenda Duncan 14 (–); Joyce Christ 3/27 (10 overs)

Australia Women won by an innings and 26 runs
Cooks Gardens, Wanganui

- Wanganui Women won the toss and chose to bat.

=== 1-day match: Nelson v Australia ===
28 February 1961
Scorecard

Nelson	v	Australia
44 (36.3 overs); Joan Linton 11 (–); Joyce Christ 3/14 (8 overs)		169/1d (40 overs); Mary Allitt 62* (–)
98/9 (47 overs); M Papps 20* (–); Patricia Thomson 5/32 (14 overs)

Match drawn
Trafalgar Park, Nelson

- Nelson Women won the toss and chose to bat.
- Australia Women won on first innings.

=== 2-day match: Wellington v Australia ===
3 – 4 March 1961
Scorecard

Wellington	v	Australia
135 (115 overs); Ina Lamason 32* (–); Joyce Christ 5/20 (26 overs)		28/1 (23 overs); Mary Allitt 16* (–); Wendy Coe 1/0 (2 overs)

Match drawn
Basin Reserve, Wellington
Umpires: James Brown (NZ) and GH Gilling (NZ)

- Wellington Women won the toss and chose to bat.

=== 2-day match: Otago v Australia ===
8 – 9 March 1961
Scorecard

Otago	v	Australia
52 (61.1 overs); Dot Ives 12 (–); Marjorie Marvell 5/5 (18.1 overs)		154 (101 overs); Janice Parker 32 (–); Eris Paton 4/29 (23 overs)
63 (74.5 overs); Eris Paton 17 (–); Patricia Thomson 3/4 (6 overs)

Australia Women won by an innings and 39 runs
Gardens Ground, Dunedin
Umpires: Phyllis Holley (NZ) and H Singleton (NZ)

- Otago Women won the toss and chose to bat.

=== 1-day match: Southland v Australia ===
11 March 1961
Scorecard

Southland	v	Australia
36 (33.1 overs); Jill Saulbrey 12 (–); Janice Parker 3/5 (8.1 overs)		99/0d (29 overs); Mary Allitt 58* (–)
31/4 (21 overs); Jill Saulbrey 11* (–); Coralie Towers 2/4 (6 overs)

Match drawn
Queens Park, Invercargill
Umpires: Harold Cassie (NZ) and Robert Pollok (NZ)

- Australia Women won the toss and chose to field.
- Australia Women won on first innings.

=== 2-day match: Canterbury v Australia ===
24 – 25 March 1961
Scorecard

Canterbury	v	Australia
251/5d (93.5 overs); Pat Moore 101 (–); Marjorie Marvell 4/47 (24.5 overs)		115 (79 overs); Una Paisley 28 (–); Ethna Rouse 3/9 (6 overs)
		79/9 (68 overs) (f/o); Norma Wilson 22 (–); Phyl Blackler 6/27 (22 overs)

Match drawn
Hagley Oval, Christchurch

- Toss not known.

== WTest Series ==
=== 1st Test ===
17 – 20 March 1961
Scorecard

New Zealand	v	Australia
241/8d (187 overs); Joyce Powell 63 (–); Patricia Thomson 2/39 (27 overs)		193 (89.2 overs); Joyce Christ 53 (–); Eris Paton 4/35 (27.2 overs)
138/7d (66 overs); Betty Thorner 37 (–); Miriam Knee 2/28 (17 overs)		100/8 (57 overs); Liz Amos 27 (–); Loretta Bayliss 5/28 (18 overs)

Match drawn
Carisbrook, Dunedin
Umpires: James Harwood (NZ) and John Ferguson (NZ)

- New Zealand Women won the toss and elected to bat.
- Liz Amos, Miriam Knee, Muriel Picton, Patricia Thomson, Norma Wilson (Aus), Loretta Bayliss, Pat Moore and Daphne Robinson (NZ) all made their WTest debuts.
