= New South Wales women's cricket team =

Australian women's cricket team

New South Wales

Personnel
- Captain: Alyssa Healy
- Coach: Gavan Twining

Team information
- Colours: Light Blue Dark Blue
- Founded: First recorded match: 1891
- Home ground: North Sydney Oval
- Capacity: 16,000
- Secondary home ground(s): Hurstville Oval, Blacktown ISP Oval

History
- First-class debut: Victoria in 1934 at University Oval, Sydney
- AWCC wins: 13
- WNCL wins: 20
- WT20C wins: 2
- Official website: NSW Breakers

The New South Wales women's cricket team, nicknamed the Breakers, is the women's representative cricket team for the Australian State of New South Wales. They play most of their home games at North Sydney Oval and they also use Hurstville Oval, Sydney and Blacktown ISP Oval, Sydney. They compete in the Women's National Cricket League (WNCL), the premier 50-over women's cricket tournament in Australia, and are by far its most successful team, having won 20 titles. They previously played in the now-defunct Australian Women's Twenty20 Cup and Australian Women's Cricket Championships.

== History ==
=== 1891–1930: Early history ===
New South Wales's first recorded match was against Victoria on 17 March 1891, however, the result is unknown. Their first match with a known result was also against Victoria, with New South Wales winning a one-day, two innings match by 53 runs on 21 April 1930.

=== 1931–1996: Australian Women's Cricket Championships ===
New South Wales played alongside Queensland and Victoria in the inaugural season of the Australian Women's Cricket Championships in 1930–31. They continued to play in the Championships until its final season in 1995–96. They won the title 13 times, making them the second most successful team after Victoria.

=== 1996–present: Women's National Cricket League and Twenty20 Cup ===
New South Wales joined the newly established WNCL in 1996–97. They are by far its most successful team, having won 20 titles, their most recent being the 2018–19 competition. New South Wales also won two Twenty20 Cups in 2012–13 and 2014–15.

== Grounds ==
New South Wales have used a number of grounds over the years. Their first recorded match against Victoria in 1891 was played at the Sydney Cricket Ground, which they have continued to use intermittently. Historically they have played the vast majority of their home matches at various grounds in Sydney as well as intermittent matches in Newcastle.

Since 2012, New South Wales have played most of their home matches at Blacktown ISP Oval as well as occasional matches at North Sydney Oval and Hurstville Oval. They played their two 2020–21 WNCL home games at North Sydney Oval. In the 2021–22 WNCL, they played three matches at North Sydney Oval and two at Hurstville Oval. In the 2022–23 WNCL, they continued to use North Sydney Oval, as well as playing their first ever WNCL matches at Wade Park, Orange.

== Players ==
=== Current squad ===
Based on squad announced for the 2023/24 season. Players in bold have international caps.

No.	Name	Nat.	Birth date	Batting style	Bowling style	Notes
Batters
44	**Elsa Hunter**	(Malaysia)	20 February 2005 (age 21)	Right-handed	Right-arm leg break	
2	Lauren Kua	(Australia)		Right-handed	Right-arm medium	
44	Anika Learoyd	(Australia)	14 April 2002 (age 24)	Right-handed	Right-arm off break	
18	**Phoebe Litchfield**	(Australia)	18 April 2003 (age 23)	Left-handed	Right-arm leg break	
85	Claire Moore	(Australia)	28 October 2003 (age 22)	Right-handed	Right-arm medium	
All-rounders
55	**Georgia Adams**	(England)	4 October 1993 (age 33)	Right-handed	Right-arm off break	Overseas player
29	**Erin Burns**	(Australia)	22 June 1988 (age 38)	Right-handed	Right-arm off break	
30	**Hannah Darlington**	(Australia)	25 January 2002 (age 24)	Right-handed	Right-arm medium	
6	**Ashleigh Gardner**	(Australia)	15 April 1997 (age 29)	Right-handed	Right-arm off break	
58	Sammy-Jo Johnson	(Australia)	5 November 1992 (age 33)	Right-handed	Right-arm medium-fast	
Wicket-keepers
77	**Alyssa Healy**	(Australia)	24 March 1990 (age 36)	Right-handed	—	Captain
10	Kate Pelle	(Australia)	17 January 2006 (age 20)	Right-handed	Right-arm medium	
21	Tahlia Wilson	(Australia)	21 October 1999 (age 26)	Right-handed	Right-arm medium	
Bowlers
9	Jade Allen	(Australia)	13 November 2003 (age 22)	Right-handed	Right-arm leg break	
30	Samantha Bates	(Australia)	29 November 1995 (age 30)	Right-handed	Left-arm slow left-arm orthodox	
66	Maitlan Brown	(Australia)	5 June 1997 (age 29)	Right-handed	Right-arm fast-medium	
16	**Stella Campbell**	(Australia)	15 June 2002 (age 24)	Right-handed	Right-arm medium	
25	**Lauren Cheatle**	(Australia)	6 November 1998 (age 27)	Left-handed	Left-arm fast-medium	
15	**Sarah Coyte**	(Australia)	30 March 1991 (age 35)	Right-handed	Right-arm medium-fast	
30	Sienna Eve	(Australia)	18 February 2005 (age 21)	Right-handed	Left-arm slow left-arm orthodox	
11	Ebony Hoskin	(Australia)	23 March 2003 (age 23)	Right-handed	Right-arm medium	
19	Isabella Malgioglio	(Australia)	22 March 2002 (age 24)	Right-handed	Right-arm leg break	
24	Frankie Nicklin	(Australia)	20 January 2005 (age 21)	Right-handed	Right-arm leg break	

=== Notable players ===
Players who have played for New South Wales and played internationally are listed below, in order of first international appearance (given in brackets):

- (Australia) Margaret Peden (1934)
- (Australia) Hazel Pritchard (1934)
- (Australia) Ruby Monaghan (1934)
- (Australia) Essie Shevill (1934)
- (Australia) Fernie Blade (1934)
- (Australia) Barbara Peden (1935)
- (Australia) Rene Shevill (1935)
- (Australia) Amy Hudson (1935)
- (Australia) Molly Flaherty (1937)
- (Australia) Alicia Walsh (1937)
- (Australia) Alice Wegemund (1937)
- (Australia) Mollie Dive (1948)
- (Australia) Norma Whiteman (1948)
- (Australia) Thelma McKenzie (1948)
- (Australia) Florence McClintock (1949)
- (Australia) Joyce Christ (1949)
- (Australia) Mary Allitt (1951)
- (Australia) Kit Raymond (1957)
- (Australia) Olive Smith (1957)
- (Australia) Joyce Dalton (1958)
- (Australia) Marjorie Marvell (1958)
- (Australia) Muriel Picton (1961)
- (Australia) Patricia Thomson (1961)
- (Australia) Hazel Buck (1963)
- (Australia) Helen Lee (1963)
- (Australia) Patsy May (1968)
- (Australia) Margaret Wilson (1969)
- (Australia) Bev Wilson (1972)
- (Australia) Tina Macpherson (1972)
- (Australia) Jackie Potter (1973)
- (Australia) Wendy Weir (1973)
- (Australia) Karen Price (1975)
- (Australia) Jan Lumsden (1976)
- (Australia) Marie Cornish (1976)
- (Australia) Julie Stockton (1976)
- (Australia) Debbie Martin (1979)
- (Australia) Judith Laing (1979)
- (Australia) Denise Emerson (1982)
- (Australia) Lindsay Reeler (1984)
- (Australia) Trish Dawson (1984)
- (Australia) Christina Matthews (1984)
- (Australia) Lyn Larsen (1984)
- (Australia) Debbie Wilson (1984)
- (Australia) Denise Annetts (1985)
- (Australia) Leonie Callaghan (1985)
- (Australia) Sally Griffiths (1985)
- (Australia) Belinda Haggett (1986)
- (Australia) Sally Moffat (1987)
- (Australia) Cathy Smith (1987)
- (Ireland) Sonia Reamsbottom (1987)
- (Australia) Bronwyn Calver (1991)
- (Australia) Belinda Clark (1991)
- (Australia) Jo Garey (1995)
- (Australia) Lisa Keightley (1995)
- (Australia) Olivia Magno (1995)
- (Australia) Michelle Goszko (1997)
- (Australia) Martha Winch (1999)
- (Australia) Terry McGregor (1999)
- (Australia) Julie Hayes (2000)
- (Australia) Lisa Sthalekar (2001)
- (Australia) Emma Liddell (2002)
- (Australia) Alex Blackwell (2003)
- (Australia) Leonie Coleman (2004)
- (Australia) Shannon Cunneen (2004)
- (Australia) Kate Blackwell (2004)
- (England) Holly Colvin (2005)
- (Australia) Sarah Andrews (2006)
- (England) Laura Marsh (2006)
- (Australia) Leah Poulton (2006)
- (Australia) Ellyse Perry (2007)
- (Australia) Rene Farrell (2007)
- (Australia) Erin Osborne (2009)
- (Australia) Rachael Haynes (2009)
- (Australia) Alyssa Healy (2010)
- (Australia) Sarah Coyte (2010)
- (Australia) Sharon Millanta (2011)
- (Australia) Naomi Stalenberg (2016)
- (Australia) Lauren Cheatle (2016)
- (Australia) Ashleigh Gardner (2017)
- (Australia) Belinda Vakarewa (2017)
- (Australia) Sarah Aley (2017)
- (Australia) Nicola Carey (2018)
- (Australia) Erin Burns (2019)
- (Australia) Hannah Darlington (2021)
- (Australia) Stella Campbell (2021)
- (Scotland) Saskia Horley (2022)
- (Australia) Phoebe Litchfield (2022)

== Coaching staff ==
- Head coach: Gavan Twining
- Assistant coach: Ben Sawyer
- Head of Female Cricket: Leah Poulton

== Honours ==
- Australian Women's Cricket Championships:
  - Winners (13): 1930–31, 1931–32, 1932–33, 1936–37, 1937–38, 1950–51, 1958–59, 1961–62, 1962–63, 1974–75, 1983–84, 1989–90, 1993–94
- Women's National Cricket League:
  - Winners (20): 1996–97, 1997–98, 1998–99, 1999–2000, 2000–01, 2001–02, 2003–04, 2005–06, 2006–07, 2007–08, 2008–09, 2009–10, 2010–11, 2011–12, 2012–13, 2013–14, 2014–15, 2016–17, 2017–18, 2018–19
- Australian Women's Twenty20 Cup:
  - Winners (2): 2012–13, 2014–15

== See also ==
- Cricket in New South Wales
- Cricket NSW
- New South Wales men's cricket team
- Sydney Sixers (WBBL)
- Sydney Thunder (WBBL)
