= List of Australia women Test cricketers =

This is a List of Australia women Test cricketers who have played Test cricket for the Australia national women's cricket team. The list is arranged in the order in which each player won her Test cap. Until 2001, players making their debut in the same Test would have their cap number determined by appearance in the batting order, except for Margaret Peden who was allocated cap number one due to being Australia's captain in the first-ever Test. Since 2001, players debuting in the same Test have had their cap number determined by alphabetical order.

== Key ==
General

- ‡ – Captain
- † – Wicket-keeper
- Mat – Number of matches played

Batting

- Inn – Number of innings batted
- Runs – Runs scored in career
- HS – Highest score
- 100 – Centuries scored
- 50 – Half-centuries scored
- Avg – Runs scored per dismissal
- * – Batsman remained not out

Bowling

- Balls – Balls bowled in career
- Wkt – Wickets taken in career
- BBI – Best bowling in an innings
- BBM – Best bowling in a match
- Ave – Average runs per wicket

Fielding

- Ca – Catches taken
- St – Stumpings effected

== Players ==
Statistics are correct as of 6 March 2026.

Australian women Test cricketers					Batting						Bowling					Fielding	
Cap	Name	First	Last	Mat	Inn	Runs	HS	50	100	Avg	Balls	Wkt	BBI	BBM	Avg	Ca	St
1	Margaret Peden	1934	1937	6	12	87	34	0	0	8.70	–	–	–	–	–	–	–
2	Hazel Pritchard	1934	1937	6	12	340	87	3	0	28.33	–	–	–	–	–	1	–
3	Ruby Monaghan	1934	1935	2	4	29	12	0	0	7.25	–	–	–	–	–	–	–
4	Nell McLarty	1934	1937	5	10	66	23	0	0	6.60	888	11	3/29	4/54	20.36	8	–
5	Essie Shevill	1934	1935	3	6	110	63*	1	0	22.00	90	1	1/2	1/39	49.00	1	–
6	Kath Smith	1934	1937	6	12	335	88	2	0	27.91	1050	13	4/50	4/47	31.53	2	–
7	Hilda Hills	1934	1934	1	1	2	2*	0	0	–	–	–	–	–	–	–	–
8	Lorna Kettels	1934	1935	2	4	19	9	0	0	4.75	132	0	–	–	–	2	–
9	Anne Palmer	1934	1935	3	6	92	39	0	0	15.33	278	10	7/18	7/27	12.00	1	–
10	Peggy Antonio	1934	1937	6	12	128	37	0	0	11.63	990	31	6/49	9/91	13.90	–	–
11	Fernie Blade	1934	1934	1	2	4	4	0	0	4.00	60	0	–	–	–	–	–
12	Joyce Brewer	1935	1935	2	4	100	34	0	0	25.00	12	0	–	–	–	–	–
13	Barbara Peden	1935	1937	4	8	94	33	0	0	13.42	120	1	1/9	1/27	50.00	2	0
14	Rene Shevill	1935	1935	2	3	15	10	0	0	7.50	–	–	–	–	–	1	–
15	Amy Hudson	1935	1951	9	16	451	81*	3	0	34.69	610	16	3/9	5/46	16.25	3	–
16	Winnie George	1937	1937	3	6	170	62*	1	0	42.50	–	–	–	–	–	2	1
17	Patricia Holmes	1937	1937	3	6	176	70	1	0	29.33	222	2	1/6	1/30	42.50	–	–
18	Molly Flaherty	1937	1949	6	8	54	14*	0	0	10.80	828	8	2/4	4/98	30.50	1	–
19	Alicia Walsh	1937	1937	3	6	56	24	0	0	9.33	330	5	2/52	2/58	41.40	1	–
20	Elsie Deane	1937	1937	1	2	2	1*	0	0	2.00	18	0	–	–	–	–	–
21	Alice Wegemund	1937	1937	2	4	14	5	0	0	4.66	–	–	–	–	–	2	5
22	Molly Dive	1948	1951	7	11	177	59	2	0	16.09	96	1	1/6	1/6	22.00	1	–
23	Joan Schmidt	1948	1951	7	12	210	42	0	0	17.50	–	–	–	–	–	8	–
24	Una Paisley	1948	1961	12	17	471	108	0	2	27.70	1365	19	3/10	3/22	22.94	7	–
25	Betty Wilson	1948	1958	11	16	862	127	3	3	57.46	2885	68	7/7	11/16	11.80	10	–
26	Lorna Larter	1948	1951	7	10	72	17	0	0	9.00	–	–	–	–	–	7	9
27	Norma Whiteman	1948	1951	7	10	151	36*	0	0	25.16	1635	22	4/33	5/50	20.54	12	–
28	Thelma McKenzie	1948	1948	1	–	–	–	–	–	–	–	–	–	–	–	–	–
29	Myrtle Edwards	1948	1948	1	–	–	–	–	–	–	21	1	1/7	1/7	7.00	1	–
30	Myrtle Baylis	1948	1951	6	6	22	9*	0	0	7.33	1242	16	2/20	4/95	19.62	3	–
31	Flo McClintock	1949	1949	2	4	40	20	0	0	13.33	126	0	–	–	–	–	–
32	Joyce Christ	1949	1961	8	10	255	73	2	0	25.50	594	6	2/11	2/29	31.33	6	–
33	Alma Vogt	1949	1949	1	1	3	3	0	0	3.00	90	0	–	–	–	–	–
34	Dot Laughton	1949	1949	1	1	47	47	0	0	47.00	–	–	–	–	–	1	–
35	Mary Allitt	1951	1963	11	20	348	76	1	0	17.40	–	–	–	–	–	3	–
36	Valma Batty	1951	1961	7	12	272	70	2	0	24.72	18	0	–	–	–	–	–
37	Mavis Jones	1951	1951	3	4	19	17	0	0	6.33	450	1	1/14	1/24	131.00	4	–
38	June James	1951	1951	1	2	7	7	0	0	3.50	144	3	2/33	3/47	15.66	–	–
39	Ruth Dow	1957	1958	3	5	120	58	1	0	30.00	696	10	4/21	5/69	17.70	2	–
40	Kit Raymond	1957	1961	2	3	11	6	0	0	3.66	6	0	–	–	–	1	–
41	Barbara Orchard	1957	1958	2	3	21	17*	0	0	10.50	102	1	1/7	1/18	26.00	–	–
42	Eileen Massey	1957	1958	4	6	53	32	0	0	17.66	504	3	2/14	2/26	58.66	2	–
43	Val Slater	1957	1957	1	1	9	9	0	0	9.00	61	4	4/13	4/13	3.25	2	–
44	Joyce Bath	1957	1958	3	3	9	8*	0	0	4.50	334	7	3/11	5/52	11.42	1	–
45	Olive Smith	1957	1969	4	2	4	4	0	0	2.00	–	–	–	–	–	6	5
46	Nell Massey	1958	1958	3	6	98	40*	0	0	19.60	–	–	–	–	–	3	6
47	Joyce Dalton	1958	1958	3	4	104	59*	1	0	34.66	–	–	–	–	–	–	–
48	Faith Coulthard	1958	1958	1	1	3	3	0	0	3.00	36	0	–	–	–	1	–
49	Marjorie Marvell	1958	1963	5	5	22	15	0	0	7.33	1230	6	2/40	2/40	50.83	4	–
50	Marie McDonough	1958	1958	1	–	–	–	–	–	–	–	–	–	–	–	1	–
51	Muriel Picton	1961	1969	7	10	111	29	0	0	18.50	818	8	2/40	3/51	38.12	5	–
52	Norma Wilson	1961	1963	3	5	19	9	0	0	3.80	–	–	–	–	–	6	1
53	Liz Amos	1961	1963	4	7	182	55	1	0	30.33	12	0	–	–	–	–	–
54	Miriam Knee	1961	1972	8	14	319	96	3	0	26.58	2274	35	5/35	8/57	16.28	4	–
55	Patricia Thomson	1961	1963	4	6	107	30	0	0	26.75	420	2	2/39	2/41	73.50	3	–
56	Lynn Denholm	1963	1977	8	14	349	93	1	0	29.08	301	5	2/10	4/46	23.60	6	–
57	Janice Parker	1963	1969	5	8	172	60	2	0	24.57	92	3	2/13	2/13	11.33	3	–
58	Hazel Buck	1963	1963	3	5	169	47	0	0	33.80	78	2	2/3	2/3	5.50	1	–
59	Lorraine Kutcher	1963	1969	4	5	68	52	1	0	22.66	881	16	5/49	6/68	18.62	1	–
60	Helen Lee	1963	1963	2	3	60	25*	0	0	30.00	292	4	3/24	4/39	17.50	2	–
61	Margaret Jude	1963	1963	1	2	9	5	0	0	4.50	–	–	–	–	–	2	2
62	Elaine Bray	1968	1977	5	8	261	86	2	0	37.28	32	0	–	–	–	2	–
63	Dawn Newman	1968	1969	3	5	154	76	2	0	30.80	–	–	–	–	–	1	–
64	Joyce Goldsmith	1968	1969	3	4	129	58	1	0	32.25	501	3	2/44	2/68	71.33	3	–
65	Anne Gordon	1968	1977	9	11	195	38*	0	0	19.50	1808	22	5/57	10/118	23.09	4	–
66	Patsy May	1968	1976	7	6	38	17	0	0	19.00	996	6	2/33	2/66	53.16	2	–
67	Jillian Need	1968	1969	2	2	4	4	0	0	4.00	216	0	–	–	–	–	–
68	Margaret Wilson	1969	1969	1	1	0	0	0	0	0.00	40	0	–	–	–	1	–
69	Shirley Banfield	1972	1972	1	2	41	21	0	0	20.50	–	–	–	–	–	–	–
70	Dawn Rae	1972	1972	1	2	53	38	0	0	26.50	145	1	1/26	1/26	26.00	1	–
71	Bev Wilson	1972	1975	2	4	88	51	1	0	22.00	–	–	–	–	–	1	–
72	Margaret Jennings	1972	1977	8	12	341	104	2	1	28.41	–	–	–	–	–	14	10
73	Lesley Johnston	1972	1972	1	2	28	22	0	0	14.00	370	8	7/24	8/112	14.00	1	–
74	Wendy Blunsden	1972	1976	7	5	53	23*	0	0	13.25	1520	7	2/13	2/13	53.85	4	–
75	Raelee Thompson	1972	1985	16	22	162	25	0	0	11.57	4304	57	5/33	8/31	18.24	12	–
76	Tina Macpherson	1972	1972	1	2	3	3	0	0	1.50	248	6	3/26	6/88	14.66	1	–
77	Jackie Potter	1975	1975	1	2	78	51	1	0	78.00	–	–	–	–	–	–	–
78	Lorraine Hill	1975	1977	7	10	499	118*	2	1	62.37	144	0	–	–	–	1	–
79	Karen Price	1975	1985	8	12	278	104*	1	1	25.27	1724	26	6/72	10/107	20.30	2	–
80	Sharon Tredrea	1975	1984	10	14	346	63	1	0	31.45	2455	30	4/22	7/47	26.13	8	–
81	Wendy Weir	1975	1979	2	1	25	25	0	0	25.00	376	4	3/46	4/107	44.50	–	–
82	Janette Tredrea	1976	1976	5	7	210	67	1	0	30.00	–	–	–	–	–	3	–
83	Wendy Hills	1976	1979	9	12	351	69*	1	0	31.90	288	1	1/8	1/8	78.00	2	–
84	Jan Lumsden	1976	1977	6	8	345	123	1	1	43.12	106	0	–	–	–	4	–
85	Marie Cornish	1976	1979	9	8	90	46*	0	0	15.00	1842	25	5/51	5/51	20.12	6	–
86	Betty McDonald	1976	1976	1	–	–	–	–	-	–	66	0	–	–	–	–	–
87	Peta Verco	1977	1985	13	20	765	105	4	1	40.26	2058	21	3/20	3/35	23.42	12	–
88	Christine White	1977	1977	1	1	1	1	0	0	1.00	40	0	–	–	–	–	–
89	Debbie Martin	1979	1979	3	4	73	36	0	0	18.25	16	0	–	–	–	–	–
90	Julie Stockton	1979	1979	3	4	162	117	0	1	40.50	24	0	–	–	–	6	1
91	Jill Kennare	1979	1985	12	19	702	131	2	3	36.94	102	1	1/0	1/0	23.00	2	–
92	Judith Laing	1979	1979	3	4	119	84	1	0	29.75	168	1	1/23	1/23	69.00	5	–
93	Sharyn Hill	1979	1979	3	4	80	38	0	0	20.00	360	4	2/17	2/19	13.50	3	–
94	Jen Jacobs	1979	1984	7	11	136	48	0	0	13.60	838	8	4/72	4/103	41.25	4	–
95	Lindsay Reeler	1984	1987	10	15	510	110*	3	1	39.23	168	2	2/27	2/45	42.00	12	0
96	Trish Dawson	1984	1984	6	10	142	72	1	0	15.77	6	0	–	–	–	4	–
97	Karen Read	1984	1985	3	6	62	21	0	0	15.50	–	–	–	–	–	–	–
98	Lyn Larsen	1984	1992	15	14	410	86	3	0	41.00	2124	26	4/33	6/73	18.73	11	–
99	Lyn Fullston	1984	1987	12	14	285	41*	0	0	31.66	3610	41	4/53	7/95	25.53	20	–
100	Christina Matthews	1984	1995	20	22	180	34*	0	0	10.58	6	0	–	–	–	46	12
101	Denise Martin	1984	1985	7	7	41	17	0	0	10.25	1332	17	4/24	6/36	17.94	5	–
102	Annette Fellows	1984	1984	3	5	53	25	0	0	10.60	48	0	–	–	–	2	–
103	Wendy Piltz	1984	1984	1	1	8	8	0	0	8.00	108	1	1/43	1/43	43.00	1	–
104	Glenda Hall	1984	1984	2	2	17	12	0	0	8.50	282	1	1/41	1/41	134.00	1	–
105	Denise Emerson	1984	1987	7	11	454	121	3	1	41.27	–	–	–	–	–	3	–
106	Debbie Wilson	1984	1991	11	9	171	92*	1	0	57.00	2812	48	5/27	9/92	18.33	4	–
107	Wendy Napier	1985	1985	2	3	21	9	0	0	7.00	–	–	–	–	–	–	–
108	Belinda Haggett	1987	1992	10	15	762	144	4	2	58.61	6	0	–	–	–	2	–
109	Denise Annetts	1987	1992	10	13	819	193	6	2	81.90	42	0	–	–	–	12	–
110	Zoe Goss	1987	1996	12	16	280	48	0	0	23.33	1956	20	3/15	5/49	25.55	1	–
111	Karen Brown	1987	1992	9	6	132	65	1	0	22.00	1590	22	5/32	5/32	15.72	10	–
112	Sally Griffiths	1987	1995	7	7	204	133	0	1	34.00	615	5	2/42	3/65	41.60	3	–
113	Jenny Owens	1987	1987	3	2	26	14	0	0	26.00	589	14	5/55	7/91	13.78	–	–
114	Ruth Buckstein	1987	1987	1	2	85	83	1	0	42.50	–	–	–	–	–	–	–
115	Katherine Raymont	1990	1990	3	5	142	47	0	0	28.40	–	–	–	–	–	2	–
116	Andrea McCauley	1990	1990	1	1	8	8	0	0	8.00	96	1	1/22	1/22	22.00	–	–
117	Joanne Broadbent	1990	1998	10	8	437	200	2	1	109.25	1177	13	3/34	4/72	23.15	2	–
118	Sally Moffat	1990	1991	5	2	13	10*	0	0	–	1025	15	4/43	5/39	12.73	1	–
119	Belinda Clark	1991	2005	15	25	919	136	6	2	45.95	78	1	1/10	1/10	28.00	4	–
120	Tunde Juhasz	1991	1991	3	5	17	9*	0	0	17.00	–	–	–	–	–	6	–
121	Cathryn Fitzpatrick	1991	2006	13	9	152	53	1	0	16.88	3603	60	5/29	9/112	19.11	5	–
122	Lee-Anne Hunter	1992	1996	2	2	40	31	0	0	40.00	72	2	2/7	2/7	3.50	–	–
123	Kim Fazackerley	1992	1996	3	1	14	14*	0	0	–	438	3	2/58	2/81	30.66	–	–
124	Charmaine Mason	1992	2001	5	1	0	0*	0	0	–	1063	13	4/40	7/79	26.07	–	–
125	Isabelle Tsakiris	1992	1992	1	–	–	–	–	–	–	300	7	4/27	7/45	6.42	–	–
126	Lisa Keightley	1995	2005	9	14	378	90	3	0	27.00	30	0	–	–	–	5	–
127	Karen Rolton	1995	2009	14	22	1002	209*	5	2	55.66	1104	14	2/6	4/68	23.35	9	–
128	Stephanie Theodore	1995	1995	1	–	–	–	–	–	–	156	1	1/48	1/74	74.00	1	–
129	Caroline Ward	1995	1995	1	2	25	24*	0	0	25.00	–	–	–	–	–	–	–
130	Avril Fahey	1995	2001	6	1	11	11	0	0	11.00	864	5	2/37	3/61	58.00	1	–
131	Jo Garey	1996	1996	1	–	–	–	–	–	–	–	–	–	–	–	–	–
132	Olivia Magno	1996	2001	5	2	41	37*	0	0	41.00	706	11	5/87	5/29	22.72	4	–
133	Julia Price	1996	2005	10	11	114	80*	1	0	19.00	–	–	–	–	–	20	2
134	Mel Jones	1998	2003	5	8	251	131	1	1	35.85	6	0	–	–	–	3	–
135	Bronwyn Calver	1998	1998	3	3	80	28	0	0	26.66	814	5	3/62	3/78	47.40	2	–
136	Jane Franklin	1998	1998	1	–	–	–	–	–	–	96	1	1/7	1/17	17.00	–	–
137	Louise Broadfoot	2001	2001	2	2	95	71	1	0	47.50	–	–	–	–	–	2	–
138	Michelle Goszko	2001	2006	4	5	217	204	0	1	43.40	–	–	–	–	–	2	–
139	Terry McGregor	2001	2003	4	3	32	23	0	0	16.00	510	10	2/7	4/20	11.20	2	–
140	Julie Hayes	2001	2006	6	9	118	57	1	0	14.75	926	10	3/9	3/29	25.70	4	–
141	Emma Liddell	2003	2005	3	4	24	24	0	0	12.00	657	12	4/57	6/75	13.00	–	–
142	Alex Blackwell	2003	2017	12	22	444	74	4	0	22.20	72	0	–	–	–	6	–
143	Lisa Sthalekar	2003	2011	8	15	416	120*	2	1	32.00	1745	23	5/30	6/114	20.95	3	–
144	Kris Britt	2003	2003	1	2	8	5	0	0	4.00	84	1	1/17	1/40	40.00	–	–
145	Kate Blackwell	2005	2008	4	7	180	72	1	0	25.71	–	–	–	–	–	7	–
146	Shelley Nitschke	2005	2011	6	11	295	88*	2	0	32.77	1180	12	3/59	3/38	27.91	–	–
147	Clea Smith	2005	2005	1	2	46	42	0	0	23.00	72	1	1/25	1/25	25.00	–	–
148	Sarah Andrews	2006	2009	3	5	33	11	0	0	11.00	447	4	2/29	2/48	33.75	3	0
149	Melissa Bulow	2006	2008	2	3	33	20	0	0	11.00	–	–	–	–	–	1	–
150	Jodie Fields	2006	2014	4	7	331	139	1	1	66.20	–	–	–	–	–	11	–
151	Leonie Coleman	2008	2008	1	2	21	13	0	0	10.50	–	–	–	–	–	3	–
152	Ellyse Perry	2008	2026	15	24	1006	213*	5	2	59.17	2061	39	6/32	9/70	21.82	6	–
153	Kirsten Pike	2008	2008	1	2	14	10	0	0	7.00	138	1	1/29	1/39	39.00	–	–
154	Emma Sampson	2008	2008	1	2	0	0*	0	0	–	267	3	2/65	3/93	31.00	–	–
155	Lauren Ebsary	2009	2009	1	2	24	21	0	0	12.00	96	2	2/35	2/43	21.50	–	–
156	Rene Farrell	2009	2014	3	5	31	11	0	0	7.75	637	17	5/23	7/55	9.88	–	–
157	Rachael Haynes	2009	2022	6	11	383	98	3	0	34.81	156	2	1/0	1/13	27.00	3	–
158	Leah Poulton	2009	2011	2	3	45	23	0	0	15.00	24	0	–	–	–	1	–
159	Jess Duffin	2011	2014	3	5	109	50	1	0	21.80	–	–	–	–	–	5	–
160	Sarah Coyte	2011	2015	4	4	19	9	0	0	4.75	691	9	2/15	4/45	20.66	–	–
161	Sarah Elliott	2011	2014	3	6	238	104	1	1	47.60	231	2	1/14	1/18	50.00	2	–
162	Alyssa Healy	2011	2026	11	17	502	99	3	0	29.52	–	–	–	–	–	23	2
163	Holly Ferling	2013	2015	3	3	5	5*	0	0	–	396	3	2/59	2/70	64.33	–	–
164	Meg Lanning	2013	2022	6	12	345	93	2	0	31.36	48	0	–	–	–	3	–
165	Erin Osborne	2013	2014	2	4	78	40	0	0	39.00	425	5	4/67	4/83	27.40	2	–
166	Megan Schutt	2013	2019	4	2	12	11	0	0	12.00	532	9	4/26	6/41	20.11	2	–
167	Elyse Villani	2013	2017	3	5	72	33	0	0	14.40	6	0	–	–	–	2	–
168	Kristen Beams	2015	2015	1	1	26	26*	0	0	–	66	0	–	–	–	–	–
169	Nicole Bolton	2015	2019	3	4	91	36	0	0	22.75	30	0	–	–	–	1	–
170	Jess Jonassen	2015	2023	6	11	291	99	2	0	29.10	833	7	2/50	2/50	46.71	3	–
171	Tahlia McGrath	2017	2026	8	11	371	73	4	0	33.72	696	11	3/24	4/52	26.72	7	–
172	Beth Mooney	2017	2026	9	14	578	106	4	1	41.28	–	–	–	–	–	16	–
173	Amanda-Jade Wellington	2017	2017	1	1	2	2	0	0	2.00	342	2	1/61	2/130	65.00	0	–
174	Ashleigh Gardner	2019	2026	8	12	326	65	3	0	29.63	1418	31	8/66	12/165	19.32	5	–
175	Sophie Molineux	2019	2024	3	4	97	41	0	0	24.25	462	7	4/95	4/95	24.85	2	–
176	Tayla Vlaeminck	2019	2019	1	–	–	–	–	–	–	66	0	–	–	–	0	–
177	Darcie Brown	2021	2026	6	5	13	8	0	0	4.33	780	16	5/21	7/68	26.81	4	–
178	Stella Campbell	2021	2021	1	1	0	0*	0	0	–	108	2	2/47	2/66	33.00	0	–
179	Annabel Sutherland	2021	2026	7	10	715	210	0	5	89.37	831	19	4/46	6/61	23.26	6	–
180	Georgia Wareham	2021	2021	1	1	2	2	0	0	2.00	66	1	1/12	1/40	40.00	0	–
181	Alana King	2022	2026	6	8	74	21	0	0	10.57	852	15	5/53	9/98	25.73	4	–
182	Kim Garth	2023	2025	4	6	103	49*	0	0	34.33	552	8	2/13	3/77	33.12	3	–
183	Phoebe Litchfield	2023	2026	5	8	156	46	0	0	22.28	–	–	–	–	–	4	–
184	Lauren Cheatle	2023	2023	1	2	6	6	0	0	6.00	54	0	–	–	–	0	–
185	Georgia Voll	2025	2026	2	3	30	16*	0	0	15.00	–	–	–	–	–	2	–
186	Lucy Hamilton	2026	2026	1	1	23	23	0	0	23.00	114	6	3/31	6/63	10.50	2	–

== See also ==
- List of Australia women ODI cricketers
- List of Australia women Twenty20 International cricketers
- List of Australia national cricket captains
