= Shevill =

Shevill is a surname. Notable people with the surname include:

- Essie Shevill (1908–1989), Australian cricketer
- Ian Shevill (1917–1988), Australian Anglican bishop
- Rene Shevill (1910–1974), Australian cricketer, sister of Essie
