= Reanna =

Reanna is a given name. Notable people with the name include:

- Reanna Blades (born 2005), English footballer
- Reanna Browne (born 1983), Australian former cricketer
- Reanna Solomon (1981–2022), Nauruan weightlifter
