= Doris Turner =

Doris Turner may refer to:

- Doris Turner (cricketer)
- Doris Turner (politician)
