= Jane Franklin (cricketer) =

Australian former cricket player

Personal information
- Full name: Jane Allanah Franklin
- Born: 11 January 1974 (age 52); Mansfield, Victoria, Australia
- Batting: Right-handed
- Bowling: Right-arm medium

International information
- National side: Australia
- Only Test (cap 136): 21 August 1998 v England
- ODI debut (cap 86): 19 July 1998 v England
- Last ODI: 27 July 1988 v Ireland

Career statistics
Competition	Test	ODI	FC	LA
Matches	1	4	6	133
Runs scored	–	39	220	1,872
Batting average	–	19.50	73.33	24.31
100s/50s	–	0/0	1/1	0/9
Top score	–	36	117*	94*
Balls bowled	96	102	453	3,580
Wickets	1	1	4	66
Bowling average	17.00	26.00	34.00	32.16
5 wickets in innings	0	0	0	0
10 wickets in match	0	0	0	0
Best bowling	1/7	1/8	2/16	3/19
Catches/stumpings	0/–	1/–	0/–	33/–
- Source: Cricinfo, 4 May 2025

Jane Allanah Franklin (born 11 January 1974 ) is an Australian former cricket player. She was born at Mansfield.

Franklin played domestic cricket for the Victoria women's cricket team between 1996 and 2009. She was a member of the Victorian Spirit team that defeated the New South Wales Breakers 2–1 in the finals series of the 2004–05 Women's National Cricket League.

Franklin played one Test and four One Day Internationals for the Australia national women's cricket team. She played two domestic Women's Twenty20 cricket matches, and 105 Women's National Cricket League matches.
