= Krystelle Jones =

Australian cricketer (born 1983)

Personal information
- Born: 30 April 1983 (age 43)
- Batting: Right-handed
- Bowling: Right-arm fast-medium

Domestic team information
- Years: Team
- 2002/03: Western Australia

Career statistics
| Competition | WLA |
|---|---|
| Matches | 2 |
| Runs scored | – |
| Batting average | – |
| 100s/50s | – |
| Top score | – |
| Balls bowled | 60 |
| Wickets | 0 |
| Bowling average | – |
| 5 wickets in innings | – |
| 10 wickets in match | – |
| Best bowling | – |
| Catches/stumpings | 0/– |
- Source: CricketArchive, 2 July 2021

Krystelle Jones (born 30 April 1983) is a former Australian cricketer. She played two List A matches for Western Australia during the 2002–03 season of the Women's National Cricket League (WNCL).
