= Patricia Holmes =

Patricia Holmes may refer to:

- Patricia Holmes (cricketer) (1917–1992), Australian cricket player
- Patricia Holmes (diplomat), Australian diplomat
- Patricia Holmes (politician) (born c. 1959), American politician in Michigan
