= North Sydney Oval =

Sports venue in North Sydney, New South Wales, Australia

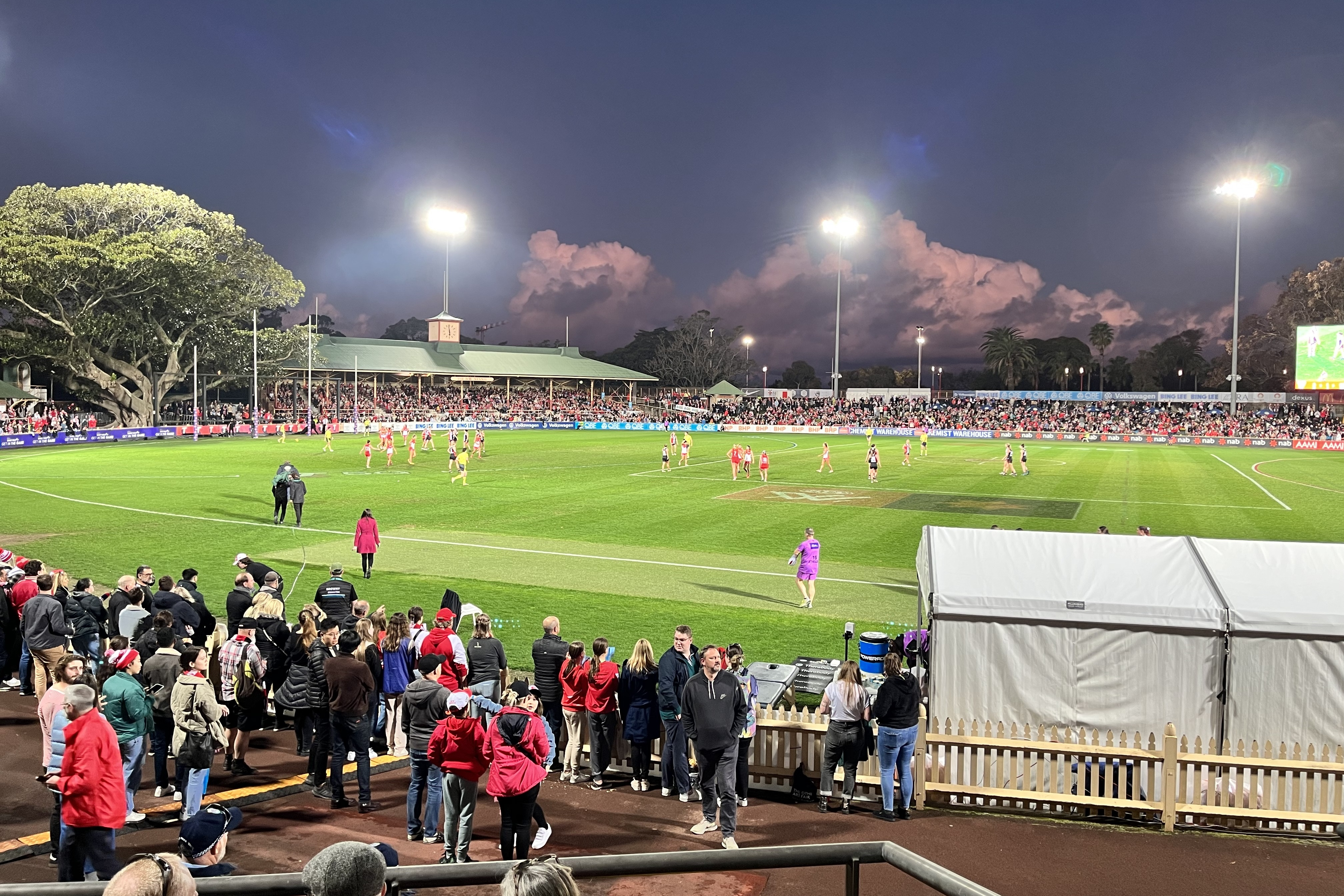
- North Sydney Oval in 2022, hosting a women's Australian rules football match
- Interactive map of North Sydney Oval
- Location: Miller Street, North Sydney
- Coordinates: 33°49′55″S 151°12′34″E
- Owner: North Sydney Council
- Operator: North Sydney Council
- Capacity: 10,000
- Surface: Grass
- Record attendance: 23,089 people, set on May 13, 1994, during a rugby league match between the North Sydney Bears and the Manly-Warringah Sea Eagles

Construction
- Opened: 1867 (redeveloped 1929, 1931, 1983, 1985)

Tenants
- North Sydney Cricket Club (1800s–present); NSW Blues Cricket (Sheffield Shield & Marsh Cup) (1800s–present); Northern Suburbs Rugby Club (1900–present); North Sydney Bears (NSWRL/NRL) (1910–1999); Northern Spirit (NSL) (1997–2003); North Sydney Bears (NSW Cup) (2000–present); Sydney Swans (AFLW) (2022-present); Sydney Sixers (BBL) (2023–present); Perth Bears (NRL) (2027-)

Ground information
- Country: Australia
- End names
- Fig Tree End; Scoreboard End

International information
- First women's Test: 25–28 January 1969: Australia v England
- Last women's Test: 9–12 November 2017: Australia v England
- First women's ODI: 3 December 1988: Australia v England
- Last women's ODI: 12 January 2025: Australia v England
- First women's T20I: 20 January 2012: Australia v New Zealand
- Last women's T20I: 2 October 2023: Australia v West Indies
- As of 12 January 2025; Source: Cricinfo; CricketArchive

North Sydney Oval (also referred to as Bear Park by North Sydney Bears fans) is a multi-use sporting facility in Miller Street, North Sydney, New South Wales, Australia, owned and operated by North Sydney Council. First used as a cricket ground in 1867, it is also used for Australian rules football, rugby league, rugby union and soccer.

== History ==
=== Development ===
The first cricket pitch was laid on 6 December 1867, making it one of the oldest cricket grounds in Australia. A simple pavilion overlooking the cricket ground was the first structure at the oval, built in 1879 and replaced in 1909. This was replaced by another pavilion which in turn was replaced by what is now the Duncan Thompson Stand in 1929.

The venue was renovated in 1931 due to complaints that the surface was 'like concrete' and that the ground was liable to cause serious injury to players. Nonetheless, as late as the 1980s, the ground was sometimes referred to as "Concrete Park". In 1935, the timber fence was replaced by a high brick wall, and a concrete terrace seating 1,200 people was built.

Major renovations were undertaken in the 1980s. The old grandstand was named after North Sydney Bears player Duncan Thompson. New stands were built and named after cricketers Bill O'Reilly, Charlie Macartney and Mollie Dive. In 1983, the venerable Bob Stand was moved to North Sydney Oval from the Sydney Cricket Ground. The hill became known as the Doug Walters Stand. Drainage and irrigation systems were installed and the pitch was re-laid in 1989.

In 1992, the oval won a Sydney Cricket Association award for "Ground of the Year".

North Sydney Oval first trialed the technology in 1998, when cricket wicket technology was in its early stages. Since then, the technology has improved substantially and is used by many premier sporting stadiums, including Sydney Showground Stadium, Adelaide Oval and the Melbourne Cricket Ground.

In 2015 it was announced that North Sydney Oval would be receiving an upgrade. The upgrades continued every year until 2019 or 2020.

== Usage ==
=== Rugby league ===
North Sydney Oval has been the home ground of the North Sydney Bears, the leading sports team on the North Shore since their inception in 1908. The first top grade rugby league match to be played at the oval came in round 1 of the 1910 NSWRL season where North Sydney defeated Glebe 13-9 in front of 3000 spectators. The club currently plays in the NSW Cup and still attracts spectators to home games at the oval. Only two grounds have hosted more first grade rugby league matches.

In 2004, South Sydney experimented with playing two home games at the ground. The first match between Souths and Manly-Warringah Sea Eagles attracted 14,855 spectators.

Legendary North Sydney, New South Wales and Australian winger Ken Irvine, who played 176 games and scored 633 points for the Bears (171 tries, 59 goals and 1 field goal) between 1958 and 1970 before transferring to Manly from 1971–73 before retiring, has the scoreboard at the oval named in his honour.

The last first grade game North Sydney played here was on August 22, 1999 against Melbourne. North Sydney won the match 24-20. The last first grade game played at the oval was on May 21, 2005 when South Sydney played a home match here against the New Zealand Warriors. The Warriors went on to win the game 34-16. As part of the Central Coast Bears' bid to enter the NRL in 2006, North Sydney planned to play one home game a year against Manly if their bid was successful.

In 2018, North Sydney Oval hosted the inaugural State of Origin women's match where New South Wales defeated Queensland 16-10. Also in 2018, North Sydney Oval was featured in a Channel 9 game for the first time since 1999 when Norths played against the Western Suburbs Magpies.

On 21 June 2019, North Sydney Oval hosted the State of Origin women's match for the second year running with a crowd of 10,515 in attendance as New South Wales defeated Queensland 14-4. In 2022, North Sydney were looking to re-enter the NRL as the 18th team. The bid would propose having some games being played at North Sydney Oval as part of the licence being awarded.

=== Cricket ===
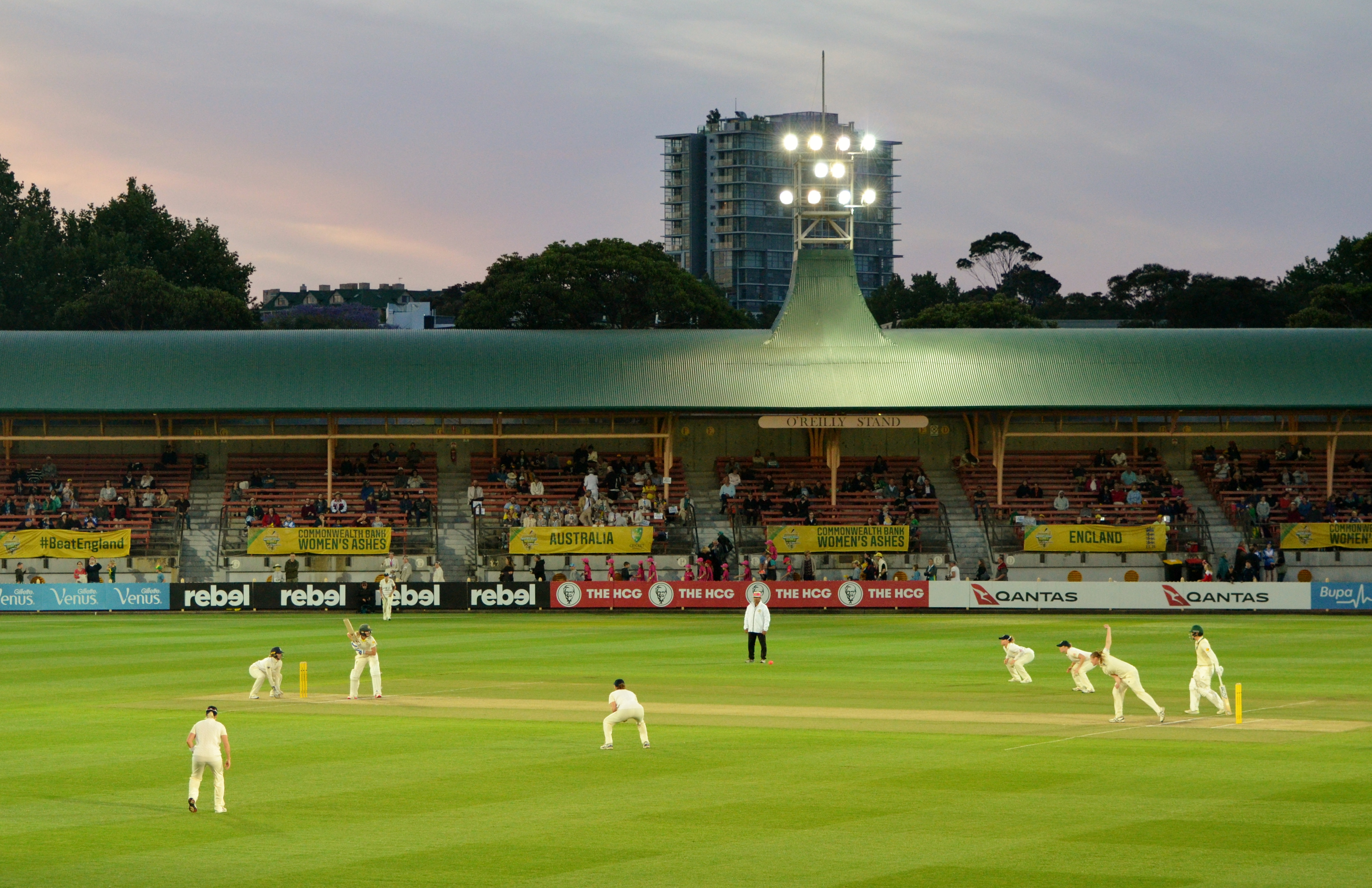
The O'Reilly Stand visible in the 2017–18 Women's Ashes series test match

The New South Wales Blues cricket team play regular Sheffield Shield, Ryobi Cup and Twenty20 Cricket matches at the Oval. The oval hosted the final of the inaugural Twenty20 domestic knock-out cup competition between NSW Blues and Victorian Bushrangers. It also plays home to the North Sydney Grade club. The ground was the host for 6 group matches and the final of the 2009 Women's Cricket World Cup.

It has hosted 5 women's test matches, with Australia playing England there in 1957/58, 1968/69 and 1991/92, 2017 (which was also the first even day-night Women's Test match) and India in 1990/91 and 12 one day internationals. New South Wales have played 3 first class matches there and 21 List A one-day games.

In September and October 2013 Sydney will host the 2013–14 Ryobi One-Day Cup. North Sydney Oval was chosen as one of the host venues along with Bankstown, Hurstville, Drummoyne ovals and the Blacktown AFL/Cricket Stadium, with North Sydney and Bankstown being the two venues used for nationally broadcast games on Channel 9 and on their HD station GEM. North Sydney will host seven games of the 20 game tournament, including the playoff for 3rd and 4th on 24 October and the final to be played on 27 October.

=== Rugby union ===
Rugby union has been played at the St Leonards Park complex since the late 1890s with the North Shore Football Club (known as the 'Pirates') playing matches there. In 1900 North Shore merged with the Wallaroos club to form Northern Suburbs Rugby Club and has had North Sydney Oval as their home ground ever since, playing all their home games in the Shute Shield at the ground.

The Sydney Rugby Union nominated North Sydney Oval to host the Grand Final of the Shute Shield in a three year deal starting in the 2016 season. This ended up coinciding with Northern Suburbs making their first Grand Final appearance in 18 years. Northern Suburbs met Sydney University Football Club who had won 7 of the last 10 premierships and ended 41 years of heartbreak winning 28-15 in front of a crowd estimated to be 18,000 strong.

Northern Suburbs made the Grand Final the following year, however lost narrowly 25-30 to Warringah in front of a second sell-out in a row and an estimated crowd of 20,000.

After another successful Shute Shield Grand Final in 201187 which saw 16,000 attendees saw Sydney University Football Club prevail 45-12 over defending premiers Warringah, the Sydney Rugby Union announced that the Grand Final would move to Western Sydney Stadium in what was received as a poor decision by fans. The 2019 Grand Final saw a crowd 40% lower than what had attended the 2018 final at North Sydney Oval

In 2025 Northern Suburbs celebrated their 125 year anniversary and use of North Sydney Oval as a home ground. The stadium was also briefly home to the Sydney Fleet during the short lived (single season) Australian Rugby Championship. With the elimination of this competition, Rugby events at the oval are limited to Northern Suburbs home games and promotional activities held by the Australian Rugby Union such as Wallaby 'Fan Days' and open training sessions.

=== Soccer ===
The oval in 2010 for the "Starlight Cinema" night

North Sydney Oval was the home ground for Northern Spirit FC (now known as GHFA Spirit FC), a now defunct club of the defunct Australian National Soccer League. In its inaugural season in 1998, an average of 15,000 spectators attended Northern Spirit FC games at North Sydney Oval including 18,985 for their first game against Sydney Olympic FC. It is generally accepted that North Sydney Oval is a poor venue for football. The ground is hard and compacted to cater for cricket, and for many months there is a cricket pitch in the middle of the ground. Northern Spirit FC paid to have a removable cricket pitch installed, but the ongoing costs of this were prohibitive. Northern Spirit also obtained government funding for half of the new lighting installed, while NSFC paid the other half. This was a major success for the club as before the new permanent lighting was installed, the older lighting was not bright enough to allow television broadcasts of night games. For 2 years Northern Spirit had hired a large amount of lighting for each game to get around the problem.

In August 2013, it was announced that Hyundai A-League side Central Coast Mariners will host a community round match against New Zealand side Wellington Phoenix at the oval on 19 December. This will be the first time an A-League match will be played at North Sydney Oval since it superseded the National Soccer League as the top Australian league in football.

In June 2014 the Mariners announced their intention to play at least one home game per season at North Sydney Oval, starting with their Round 10 fixture against Melbourne Victory.

=== Australian rules football ===
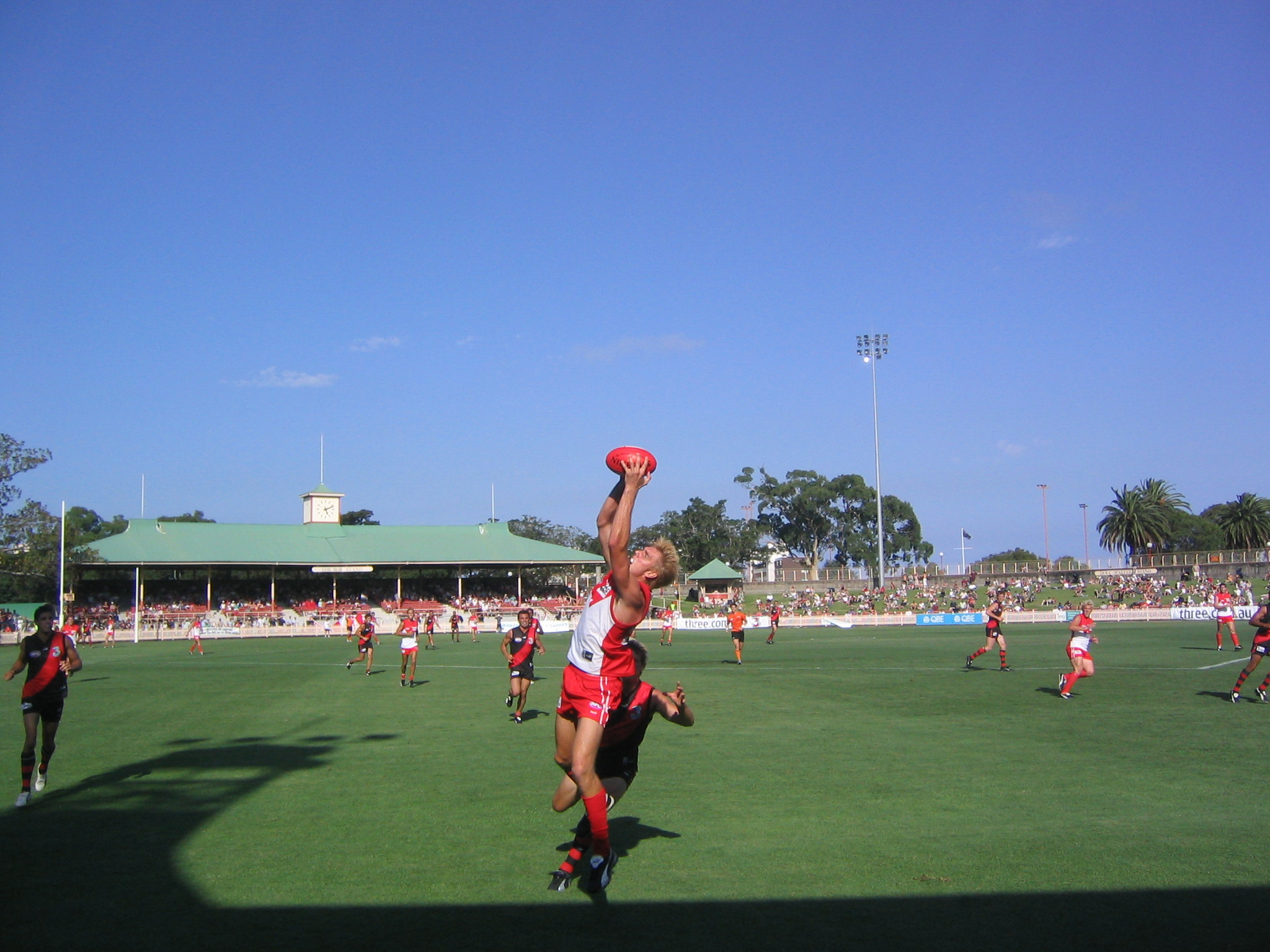
The Sydney Swans and Essendon competing in a pre-season match at North Sydney Oval in 2004.

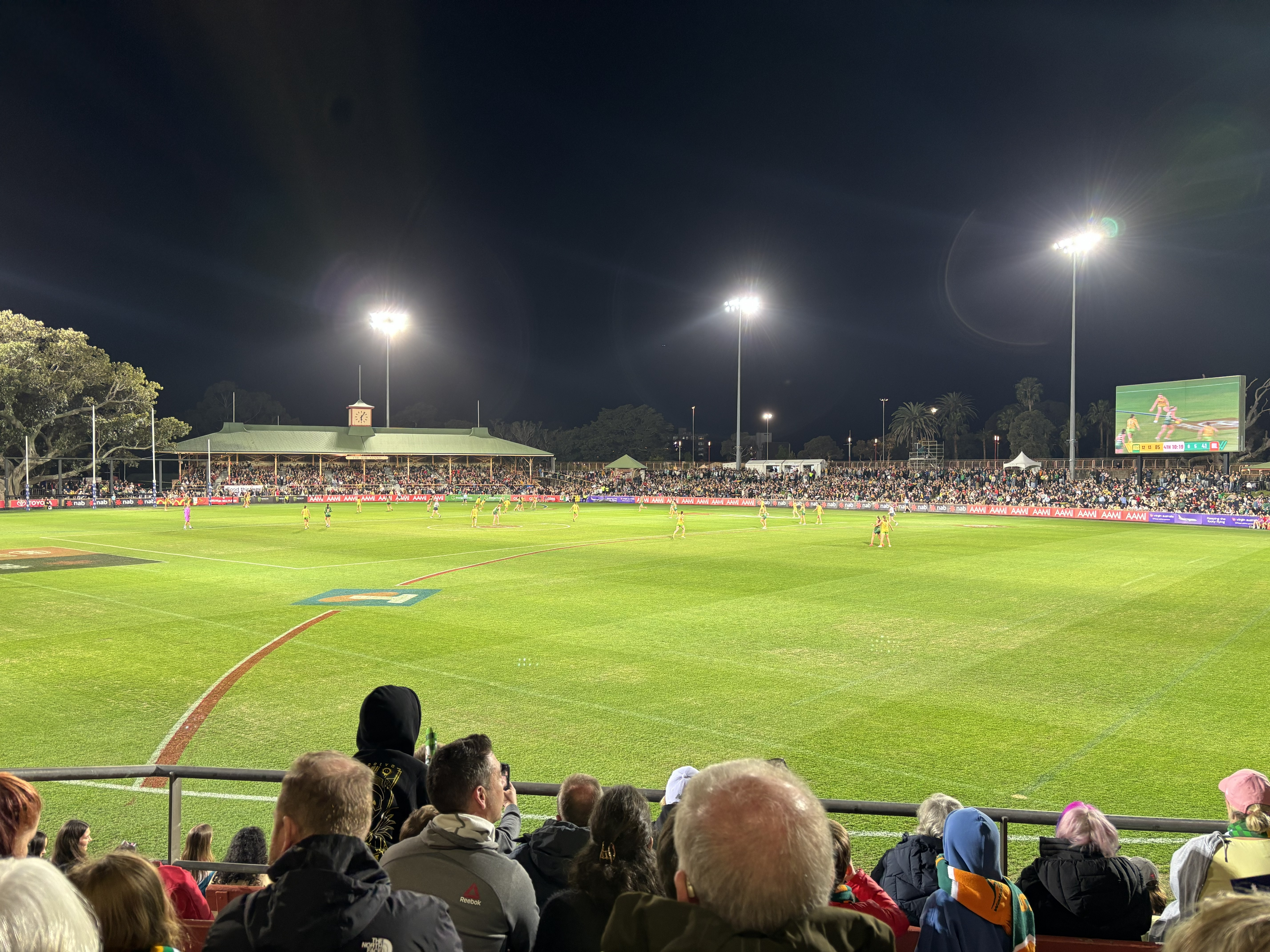
North Sydney Oval hosted the inaugural Australia v Ireland AFLW match in 2026.

The North Shore Australian Football Club played some of their home games on North Sydney Oval from 1923 up until the 1980s. Whilst rugby league matches were primarily played on Saturdays, Australian football matches were played on Sundays.

The venue hosted several Australian Football League (AFL) pre-season matches between the Sydney Swans and a rotation of opponents, the most prominent of which was Essendon. In 2007, Collingwood replaced Essendon in what had by then become a regular pre-season match at the venue, with the Swans defeating Collingwood by 15 points before a crowd of 9,560.

On 27 August 2022, the venue hosted its first AFL Women's (AFLW) premiership match when Sydney played St Kilda in round one of the 2022 season in front of 8,264 fans. The venue has hosted several AFLW fixtures featuring the Swans over the subsequent years. In 2026 it was selected as the venue for the inaugural Australia v Ireland match.

=== Sunset cinema ===
Since 2003, North Sydney Oval has been used during evenings in January and February as a venue for outdoor cinema on an inflatable screen.

== International cricket centuries ==
=== North Sydney Oval ===
==== Women's Test centuries ====
Three WTest centuries have been scored at the venue.

| No. | Score | Player | Team | Balls | Opposing team | Date | Result |
|---|---|---|---|---|---|---|---|
| 1 | 104 | Belinda Clark | Australia | – | India | 26 January 1991 | Drawn |
| 2 | 148* | Denise Annetts | Australia | 375 | England | 19 February 1992 | Won |
| 3 | 213* | Ellyse Perry | Australia | 374 | England | 9 November 2017 | Drawn |

==== Women's One Day International centuries ====
Four WODI centuries have been scored at the venue.

| No. | Score | Player | Team | Balls | Opposing team | Date | Result |
|---|---|---|---|---|---|---|---|
| 1 | 109 | Amy Satterthwaite | New Zealand | 119 | Australia | 14 December 2012 | Lost |
| 2 | 103 | Meg Lanning | Australia | 50 | New Zealand | 17 December 2012 | Won |
| 3 | 102 | Lizelle Lee | South Africa | 89 | Australia | 23 November 2016 | Lost |
| 4 | 133 | Beth Mooney | Australia | 105 | Pakistan | 21 January 2023 | Won |

==== Women's T20 International centuries ====
Four WT20I centuries has been scored at the venue.

| No. | Score | Player | Team | Balls | Opposing Team | Date | Result |
|---|---|---|---|---|---|---|---|
| 1 | 113 | Beth Mooney | Australia | 61 | Sri Lanka | 29 September 2019 | Won |
| 2 | 113 | Chamari Athapaththu | Sri Lanka | 66 | Australia | 29 September 2019 | Lost |
| 3 | 148* | Alyssa Healy | Australia | 61 | Sri Lanka | 2 October 2019 | Won |
| 4 | 132 | Hayley Matthews | West Indies | 64 | Australia | 2 October 2023 | Won |

=== North Sydney Oval No. 2 ===
==== Women's One Day International centuries ====
One WODI century has been scored at the venue.

| No. | Score | Player | Team | Balls | Opposing team | Date | Result |
|---|---|---|---|---|---|---|---|
| 1 | 114 | Nicki Turner | New Zealand | – | Netherlands | 4 December 1988 | Won |

== International cricket five-wicket hauls ==
=== Women's Test five-wicket hauls ===
There are two WTest five-wicket hauls that have been taken at this venue.

| # | Figures | Country | Player | Opponent | Date | Result |
|---|---|---|---|---|---|---|
| 1 | 5/51 | England | Lesley Clifford | Australia | 25 January 1969 | Drawn |
| 2 | 5/49 | Australia | Lorraine Kutcher | England | 25 January 1969 | Drawn |

=== Women's One Day International five-wicket hauls ===
There is one WODI five-wicket haul that has been taken at this venue.

| # | Figures | Country | Player | Opponent | Date | Result |
|---|---|---|---|---|---|---|
| 1 | 5/15 | England | Laura Marsh | Pakistan | 12 March 2009 | Won |

=== Women's T20 International five-wicket hauls ===
One WT20I five-wicket haul has been taken at this venue.

| # | Figures | Country | Player | Opponent | Date | Result |
|---|---|---|---|---|---|---|
| 1 | 5/15 | Australia | Megan Schutt | Pakistan | 24 January 2023 | Won |
