= Sandra Brown (cricketer) =

English cricketer (1939–2024)

Personal information
- Born: 14 August 1939; Sutton, Surrey, England
- Died: 22 November 2024 (aged 85); Bowral, New South Wales, Australia
- Bowling: Right-arm off break
- Role: All-rounder

International information
- National side: England (1963)
- Test debut (cap 61): 15 June 1963 v Australia
- Last Test: 20 July 1963 v Australia

Domestic team information
- Years: Team
- 1955–1968: Surrey

Career statistics
Competition	WTest	WFC
Matches	3	9
Runs scored	148	242
Batting average	37.00	22.00
100s/50s	0/1	0/1
Top score	57*	57*
Balls bowled	252	660
Wickets	0	12
Bowling average	–	20.08
5 wickets in innings	0	0
10 wickets in match	0	0
Best bowling	–	3/11
Catches/stumpings	2/–	3/–
- Source: CricketArchive, 12 December 2024

Sandra Brown (14 August 1939 – 22 November 2024) was an English cricketer who played as an all-rounder, and bowled right-arm off break. She appeared in three Test matches for England in 1963, in a series against Australia. She played domestic cricket for Surrey.
