= Hilda Hills =

Australian cricketer

Personal information
- Full name: Hilda Mary Hills
- Born: 18 July 1913
- Died: 23 March 2003 (aged 89)
- Batting: Right-handed
- Role: wicket-keeper

International information
- National side: Australia
- Only Test (cap 7): 28 December 1934 v England

Domestic team information
- Years: Team
- 1932–1936: Victoria

Career statistics
Competition	Test
Matches	1
Runs scored	2
Batting average	2
100s/50s	0/0
Top score	2*
Catches/stumpings	0/0
- Source: Cricinfo, 30 October 2014

Hilda Hills OAM, known as Hilda Spicer from 1939, (18 July 1913 – 23 March 2003) was an Australian cricketer. She was a right-handed batsman and wicket-keeper. She was born in Northcote, a northern suburb of Melbourne.

Hills began playing with the Preston Women's Cricket Club, taking up wicketkeeping as a teenager. She represented Victoria between 1932 and 1936. In 1935, she received a testimonial match, a first for a Victorian sportswoman.

Hills made a single Test appearance for Australia, in the first Women's test match in 1934. Batting in the middle order, Hills retired hurt from the first innings of the game, having broken her nose, therefore not making an appearance in the second innings of the match.

In 1983, she received the Medal of the Order of Australia (OAM) for services to "the welfare of ex-service personnel and to the community".
