= Reanna Browne =

Australian cricketer (born 1983)

Personal information
- Full name: Reanna Gail Browne
- Born: 1 December 1983 (age 42); Longreach, Queensland, Australia
- Batting: Right-handed
- Bowling: Right-arm leg break
- Role: All-rounder

Domestic team information
- Years: Team
- 2002/03–2007/08: Queensland

Career statistics
Competition	WLA
Matches	21
Runs scored	48
Batting average	5.33
100s/50s	0/0
Top score	10*
Balls bowled	383
Wickets	9
Bowling average	32.88
5 wickets in innings	0
10 wickets in match	0
Best bowling	2/9
Catches/stumpings	4/–
- Source: CricketArchive, 11 July 2021

Reanna Gail Browne (born 1 December 1983) is an Australian former cricketer. An all-rounder, she bowls right-arm leg break and is a right-handed batter. Born in Longreach, Queensland, Browne represented her home state in 21 List A matches between the 2002–03 and 2007–08 seasons of the Women's National Cricket League (WNCL). Browne represented the Australian under 19's and Shooting Stars women's cricket teams.

Browne also represented Australia in Gaelic football in 2005 touring Ireland.

Browne is an academically trained and practicing futurist, with a Master of Strategic Foresight from Swinburne University. She also holds a Bachelor of Arts in human resource management from the University of Sunshine Coast.
