= Australian Women's Cricket Championships =

Defunct Australian women's domestic cricket competition

- Countries: Australia
- Format: First-class, Limited overs
- First edition: 1930–31
- Latest edition: 1995–96
- Tournament format: Round robin and/or knockout
- Most successful: Victoria (36 titles)

The Australian Women's Cricket Championships was a women's cricket competition which ran from 1931 until 1996. It usually operated as a first-class competition, with matches played over two days. Later editions included limited overs cricket instead of, or alongside, two-day matches.

For the most part, the competition was held annually within a two-week timeframe and contested primarily by teams from the six states of Australia plus the ACT. Player performance at each tournament was used as a guide to determining Australian team selection for future international fixtures. It was the country's first formalised interstate women's cricket competition, with teams having previously only played one-off and friendly matches. Victoria was the most successful team, winning a total of 36 titles. The tournament was replaced in 1996–97 by the Women's National Cricket League.

== History ==
=== 1931–1940: Pre-War years ===
The inaugural edition of the Australian Women's Cricket Championships took place from 21 to 25 March 1931, involving New South Wales, Queensland and Victoria. Matches were played with two innings per team in a single day and are not considered to have first-class status. The first match, between New South Wales and Victoria, was abandoned without a ball bowled. New South Wales and Victoria then both won their respective matches against Queensland. A second match was played between New South Wales and Victoria, resulting in victory for the former. Records kept by Women's Cricket Australia—the national governing body for the female branch of the sport until its merger with the Australian Cricket Board in 2003—indicate New South Wales were crowned as champions.

Matches were extended to two days for the 1933–34 tournament and were considered to have first-class status for the first time. South Australia joined in 1934–35, taking the number of teams up to four, and made their second appearance in 1936–37 which coincided with the debut of Western Australia.

=== 1947–1972: Guest teams ===
After a hiatus caused by World War II, the tournament resumed in 1946–47 which saw Victoria defeat New South Wales in the final. South Australia won their first title in 1951–52. In 1956–57, New Zealand made a one-off appearance, while Queensland and South Australia fielded a combined team. For the 1959–60 tournament, New Zealand domestic team Auckland and a Victoria Second XI made sole appearances, while Queensland and South Australia—for the second and last time—once again fielded a combined team. In 1960–61, Queensland and Western Australia fielded a combined team for the first and only time. In 1962–63, Canterbury featured for a single occasion, while in 1967–68 fellow New Zealand domestic team Otago also made a one-off appearance.

=== 1973–1978: Single-innings matches added ===
Following the introduction of One Day International cricket, the 1972–73 season saw the addition of single-innings matches to the competition for the first time. The tournament, which was won by Victoria, used a 60-overs-per-side format for all games as preparation for the inaugural Women's Cricket World Cup. The next three editions reverted to two-day first-class matches, before the 1976–77 tournament was once again played as a limited overs competition ahead of the second Women's Cricket World Cup.

=== 1978–1990: Expansion ===
Australian Capital Territory joined the competition in 1978–79 and Tasmania made their first appearance in 1985–86. Matches from 1978–79 to 1989–90 were held over two days with the exceptions of 1981–82 and 1987–88, when they played as 60-over affairs as preparation for upcoming World Cup tournaments. The number of matches increased during this period, with each team playing as many as 12 matches in 1987–88. Western Australia won their first title in 1986–87.

=== 1990–1996: Hybrid format, WNCL succession ===
The 1990–91 tournament introduced a hybrid format whereby group stage games were played as 60-over matches, followed by a finals series with matches played over two days. From 1991–92, 50-over matches were played instead of 60-over matches. The hybrid format lasted for five seasons.

The 1995–96 tournament was the final edition of the Australian Women's Cricket Championships. It was played as a 50-over competition with no two-day matches. Victoria won the tournament, beating New South Wales in the final by ten runs. The competition was succeeded by the Women's National Cricket League (WNCL) which took place for the first time in 1996–97. The introduction of the WNCL meant the country's top domestic competition would change from a two-week tournament to a fully-fledged national league in which games would be played on a home-and-away basis across the course of a season. Women's cricket in Australia has since undergone a highly successful transformative phase, especially with regards to the sport's rising level of professionalism among its elite female players.

== Teams ==
Team	First	Last	Titles
Auckland	1959–60	1959–60	0
Australian Capital Territory	1978–79	1994–95	0
Canterbury	1962–63	1962–63	0
New South Wales	1930–31	1995–96	13
New Zealand	1956–57	1956–57	0
Otago	1967–68	1967–68	0
Queensland	1930–31	1995–96	0
Queensland–South Australia	1956–57	1959–60	0
Queensland–Western Australia	1960–61	1960–61	0
South Australia	1934–35	1995–96	5
Tasmania	1985–86	1990–91	0
Victoria	1930–31	1995–96	36
Victoria Second XI	1959–60	1959–60	0
Western Australia	1936–37	1995–96	1

== Results ==
Season	Winner	Runners-up	Match format	Ref
1930–31	New South Wales	Victoria	1 day	
1931–32	New South Wales	Victoria	1 day	
1932–33	New South Wales	Victoria	1 day	
1933–34	Victoria	New South Wales	2 days	
1934–35	Victoria	New South Wales	2 days	
1935–36	Victoria	New South Wales	2 days	
1936–37	New South Wales	Victoria	2 days	
1937–38	New South Wales	Victoria	2 days	
1938–39	Victoria	Queensland	2 days	
1939–40	Victoria	New South Wales	2 days	
1940–41	Not contested due to World War II			
1941–42	Not contested due to World War II			
1942–43	Not contested due to World War II			
1943–44	Not contested due to World War II			
1944–45	Not contested due to World War II			
1945–46	Not contested due to World War II			
1946–47	Victoria	New South Wales	2 days	
1947–48	Victoria		2 days	
1948–49	Victoria		2 days	
1949–50	Victoria		2 days	
1950–51	New South Wales		2 days	
1951–52	South Australia		2 days	
1952–53	Victoria		2 days	
1953–54	Victoria		2 days	
1954–55	Victoria		2 days	
1955–56	Victoria		2 days	
1956–57	Victoria	New South Wales	2 days	
1957–58	Not contested due to English tour of Australia			
1958–59	New South Wales		2 days	
1959–60	Victoria		2 days	
1960–61	Victoria		2 days	
1961–62	New South Wales		2 days	
1962–63	New South Wales		2 days	
1963–64	Victoria		2 days	
1964–65	Victoria	New South Wales	2 days	
1965–66	Victoria	South Australia	2 days	
1966–67	Victoria	New South Wales	2 days	
1967–68	Victoria	South Australia	2 days	
1968–69	Not contested due to English tour of Australia			
1969–70	Victoria		2 days	
1970–71	Victoria	New South Wales	2 days	
1971–72	Not contested			
1972–73	Victoria	New South Wales	60 overs	
1973–74	Victoria	New South Wales	2 days	
1974–75	New South Wales	Victoria	2 days	
1975–76	Victoria	New South Wales	2 days	
1976–77	Victoria	Western Australia	60 overs	
1977–78	Victoria		2 days	
1978–79	Victoria	New South Wales	2 days	
1979–80	South Australia		2 days	
1980–81	Victoria	South Australia	2 days	
1981–82	Victoria	New South Wales	60 overs	
1982–83	Victoria	South Australia	2 days	
1983–84	New South Wales	South Australia	2 days	
1984–85	Not contested due to English tour of Australia			
1985–86	Victoria		2 days	
1986–87	Western Australia	New South Wales	2 days	
1987–88	Victoria	New South Wales	60 overs	
1988–89	Not contested due to World Cup in Australia			
1989–90	New South Wales	Victoria	2 days	
1990–91	Victoria	New South Wales	60 overs, 2 days	
1991–92	South Australia	New South Wales	50 overs, 2 days	
1992–93	South Australia	New South Wales	50 overs, 2 days	
1993–94	New South Wales	Victoria	50 overs, 2 days	
1994–95	South Australia	Victoria	50 overs, 2 days	
1995–96	Victoria	New South Wales	50 overs	

== See also ==
- Australia women's national cricket team
- Women's cricket in Australia
- Women's National Cricket League
