= Ross Taylor (Australian cricketer) =

Australian cricketer (1938–1996)

Personal information
- Born: 8 May 1938; Tamworth, New South Wales, Australia
- Died: 7 December 1996 (aged 58); Tamworth, New South Wales, Australia
- Relatives: Helen Lee (wife)
- Source: ESPNcricinfo, 25 November 2020

Ross Taylor (8 May 1938 – 7 December 1996) was an Australian cricketer. He played one first-class match for New South Wales in 1959/60. He was married to Helen Lee, who played Women's Test cricket for Australia.

== See also ==
- List of New South Wales representative cricketers
