= Jacqueline Elledge =

English cricketer

Personal information
- Full name: Jacqueline Lucienne Marie-Louise Marguerite Elledge
- Born: 8 January 1937 (age 89); Wolverhampton, Staffordshire, England
- Role: Batter

International information
- National side: England (1963)
- Test debut (cap 62): 15 June 1963 v Australia
- Last Test: 20 July 1963 v Australia

Domestic team information
- Years: Team
- 1957–1964: Kent

Career statistics
Competition	WTest	WFC
Matches	3	7
Runs scored	147	287
Batting average	29.40	23.91
100s/50s	0/2	0/3
Top score	59	59
Balls bowled	18	36
Wickets	0	0
Bowling average	–	–
5 wickets in innings	–	–
10 wickets in match	–	–
Best bowling	–	–
Catches/stumpings	2/–	3/–
- Source: CricketArchive, 6 March 2021

Jacqueline Lucienne Marie-Louise Marguerite Elledge (born 8 January 1937) is an English former cricketer who played primarily as a batter. She appeared in 3 Test matches for England in 1963, in a series against Australia. She played domestic cricket for Kent.

Elledge was educated at Wolverhampton Girls' High School, where she played in the cricket team alongside Rachael Heyhoe Flint and Ann Jago.
