= Joyce Brewer =

Australian cricketer (1915–2011)

Personal information
- Full name: Phyllis Joyce Brewer
- Born: 22 March 1915; Cordalba, Queensland
- Died: 26 June 2011 (aged 96); Brisbane, Queensland
- Batting: Right-handed
- Bowling: Right-arm medium

International information
- National side: Australia
- Test debut (cap 12): 4 January 1935 v England
- Last Test: 18 January 1935 v England

Career statistics
Competition	Test
Matches	2
Runs scored	100
Batting average	25.00
100s/50s	0/0
Top score	34
Catches/stumpings	0/–
- Source: CricInfo, 15 October 2014

Phyllis Joyce Bonwick née Brewer (22 March 1915 – 26 June 2011) was an Australian cricket player. She played two Test matches for the Australia national women's cricket team.

Brewer was the twelfth woman to play Test cricket for Australia.

Brewer was awarded the Australian Sports Medal on 30 November 2000 for her contributions to sports administration.
