= Danielle Blunden =

Australian cricketer

Domestic team information
- Years: Team
- 1996/97: Western Australia

Career statistics
Competition	WLA
Matches	5
Runs scored	21
Batting average	5.25
100s/50s	0/0
Top score	10
Balls bowled	66
Wickets	1
Bowling average	47.00
5 wickets in innings	0
10 wickets in match	0
Best bowling	1/25
Catches/stumpings	1/–
- Source: CricketArchive, 5 July 2021

Danielle Blunden is a former Australian cricketer. She played five List A matches for Western Australia during the 1996–97 season of the Women's National Cricket League (WNCL).
