= Elaine Bray =

Australian cricketer (1940–1998)

Personal information
- Full name: Elaine Joy Bray
- Born: 22 March 1940
- Died: 10 January 1998 (aged 57)
- Batting: Right-handed
- Bowling: Slow left-arm orthodox

International information
- National side: Australia
- Test debut (cap 62): 27 December 1968 v England
- Last Test: 15 December 1977 v India
- ODI debut (cap 2): 23 June 1973 v Young England
- Last ODI: 13 January 1978 v England

Domestic team information
- Years: Team
- Victoria women

Career statistics
Competition	WTest	WODI
Matches	5	8
Runs scored	261	89
Batting average	37.28	17.80
100s/50s	0/2	0/0
Top score	86	40
Balls bowled	32	–
Wickets	0	–
Bowling average	–	–
5 wickets in innings	–	–
10 wickets in match	–	–
Best bowling	–	–
Catches/stumpings	2/–	0/–
- Source: CricInfo, 23 April 2014

Elaine Joy Bray (22 March 1940 – 10 January 1998) was an Australian cricketer. She played five Test matches and eight One Day Internationals for the Australia national women's cricket team.
