= Fernie Blade =

Australian cricketer

Personal information
- Full name: Fernie Leone Shevill
- Batting: Right-handed
- Bowling: Right-arm fast
- Relatives: Rene Shevill (twin sister); Essie Shevill (sister)

International information
- National side: Australia
- Only Test (cap 11): 28 December 1934 v England

Domestic team information
- Years: Team
- 1934–35: New South Wales women's cricket team

Career statistics
Competition	WTest
Matches	1
Runs scored	4
Batting average	17.00
100s/50s	0/0
Top score	4
Balls bowled	60
Wickets	0
Bowling average	–
5 wickets in innings	–
10 wickets in match	–
Best bowling	–
Catches/stumpings	0/–
- Source: Cricinfo, 11 September 2014

Fernie Leone Blade (née Shevill) (20 August 1910 – 28 September 1988) was an Australian cricketer. Blade was born in Sydney, New South Wales. She played one Test match for the Australia national women's cricket team in 1934. Blade was the eleventh woman to play test cricket for Australia. She died in Forster, New South Wales.
