= Jasmine Nevins =

Australian cricketer

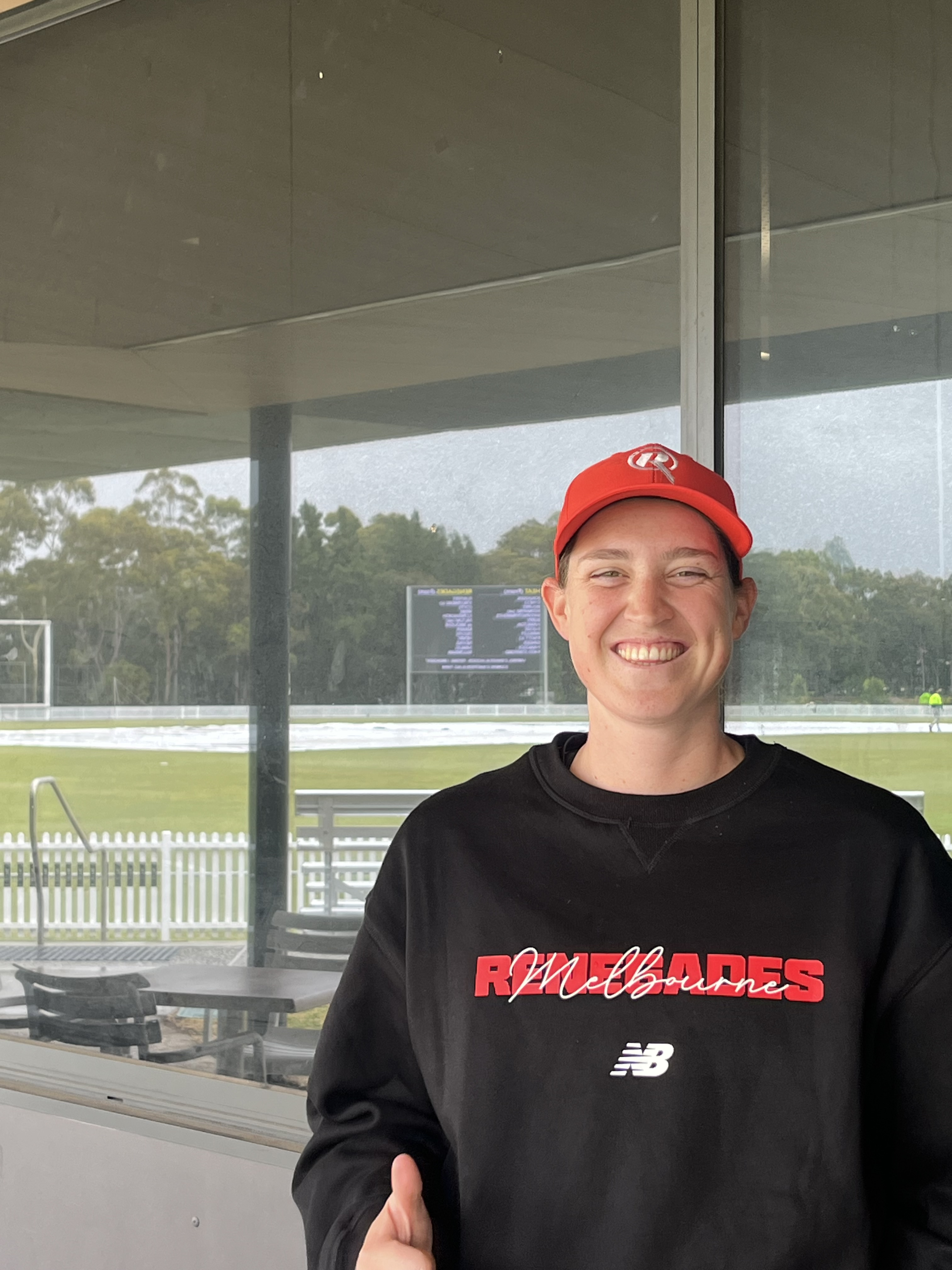

Personal information
- Full name: Jasmine Nevins
- Born: 7 October 2003 (age 23)
- Batting: Right-handed
- Bowling: Right-arm medium
- Role: Bowler

Domestic team information
- Years: Team
- 2022/23–present: Victoria

Career statistics
Competition	WLA
Matches	10
Runs scored	89
Batting average	14.20
100s/50s	0/0
Top score	36
Balls bowled	210
Wickets	4
Bowling average	49.25
5 wickets in innings	0
10 wickets in match	0
Best bowling	3/40
Catches/stumpings	1/–
- Source: CricketArchive, 3 March 2023

Jasmine Nevins (born 7 October 2003) is an Australian cricketer who currently plays for Victoria in the Women's National Cricket League (WNCL). She plays primarily as a right-arm medium bowler.

== Domestic career ==
Nevins plays grade cricket for Carlton Cricket Club.

In December 2022, Nevins played for Victoria in the Cricket Australia Under-19 National Female Championships, scoring one half-century and taking four wickets. In January 2023, Nevins was added to a senior Victoria squad for the first time. She made her debut for the side on 17 January 2022, against Queensland, scoring 11 runs and bowling three overs. She went on to play five matches overall for the side that season, scoring 71 runs and taking one wicket.
