= Shirley Banfield (cricketer) =

Australian cricketer (1937–2026)

Personal information
- Full name: Shirley Adele Banfield
- Born: 16 October 1937; Richmond, Melbourne, Victoria, Australia
- Died: 20 September 2026 (aged 88)
- Batting: Left-handed
- Bowling: Right-arm medium
- Role: Batter

International information
- National side: Australia (1972)
- Only Test (cap 69): 5 February 1972 v New Zealand

Domestic team information
- Years: Team
- 1956/57–1972/73: Victoria

Career statistics
Competition	WTest	WFC	WLA
Matches	1	29	5
Runs scored	41	797	47
Batting average	20.50	24.15	15.66
100s/50s	0/0	1/6	0/0
Top score	21	100*	22*
Balls bowled	–	40	–
Wickets	–	5	–
Bowling average	–	8.60	–
5 wickets in innings	–	0	–
10 wickets in match	–	0	–
Best bowling	–	3/14	–
Catches/stumpings	0/–	9/–	0/–
- Source: CricketArchive, 1 October 2026

Shirley Adele Banfield (16 October 1937 – 20 September 2026) was an Australian cricketer who played as a left-handed batter. She appeared in one Test match for Australia in 1972. Banfield played domestic cricket for Victoria. She died on 20 September 2026, at the age of 88.
