= Myrtle Edwards (sportswoman) =

Australian cricketer and softball player

Personal information
- Born: 7 June 1921; Clifton Hill, Victoria
- Died: 30 August 2010 (aged 89)
- Batting: Right-handed
- Bowling: Right arm leg-spin

International information
- National side: Australia
- Only Test (cap 29): 20 March 1948 v New Zealand

Career statistics
Competition	WTest
Matches	1
Runs scored	-
Batting average	-
100s/50s	-/-
Top score	-
Balls bowled	21
Wickets	1
Bowling average	7.00
5 wickets in innings	0
10 wickets in match	0
Best bowling	1/7
Catches/stumpings	1/-
- Source: CricInfo, 29 January 2015

Myrtle Edwards (7 June 1921 – 30 August 2010) was an Australian softball and cricket player.

Edwards was born in Clifton Hill, Victoria. In 1949, she was named the captain of the first Australian Open Women's Team to play a test series against New Zealand. She coached in four Women's World Championships from 1965–1978, winning gold at the inaugural 1965 ISF Women's World Championships in Melbourne. For her contribution to the sport she was inducted into both the Softball Australia and the ISF Halls of Fame, as well as becoming a Life Member of Softball Victoria.

Edwards also played one Test match for Australia against New Zealand in 1948.

Edwards died on 30 August 2010.
