= Elsie Deane =

Australian cricketer (1910–1978)

Personal information
- Full name: Elsie May Deane
- Born: 22 June 1910; Brighton, Victoria
- Died: 22 July 1978 (aged 68); Healesville, Victoria
- Batting: Right-handed
- Bowling: Right-arm medium

International information
- National side: Australia
- Only Test (cap 20): 12 June 1937 v England

Career statistics
Competition	Test
Matches	1
Runs scored	2
Batting average	2.00
100s/50s	0/0
Top score	1*
Balls bowled	18
Wickets	0
Bowling average	–
5 wickets in innings	–
10 wickets in match	–
Best bowling	–
Catches/stumpings	0/–
- Source: CricInfo, 23 November 2014

Elsie May Deane (22 June 1910 – 22 July 1978) was an Australian cricket player. Deane played one Test match for the Australia national women's cricket team. Deane was the 20th woman to play cricket for Australia.
