= Winnie George =

Australian cricketer (1914–1988)

Personal information
- Full name: Winifred Una Margaretta George
- Batting: Right-handed
- Role: wicket-keeper

International information
- National side: Australia
- Test debut (cap 16): 12 June 1937 v England
- Last Test: 10 July 1937 v England

Career statistics
Competition	Test
Matches	3
Runs scored	170
Batting average	42.50
100s/50s	0/1
Top score	62*
Balls bowled
Wickets
Bowling average
5 wickets in innings
10 wickets in match
Best bowling
Catches/stumpings	2/1
- Source: CricInfo, 7 November 2014

Winifred Una Margaretta George (19 January 1914 – 19 March 1988) was an Australian cricket player. George played three tests for the Australia national women's cricket team. George was born in Mordialloc, Victoria, and was the sixteenth woman to play Women's Test cricket for Australia. She died in Dandenong, Victoria.
