= Thelma McKenzie =

Australian cricketer (1915–2019)

Personal information
- Full name: Thelma Norma Meryl Murden
- Born: 6 April 1915; Wallerawang, New South Wales, Australia
- Died: 12 March 2019 (aged 103)
- Batting: Right-handed
- Role: Wicket-keeper

International information
- National side: Australia
- Only Test (cap 28): 20 March 1948 v New Zealand

Career statistics
Competition	WTest
Matches	1
Runs scored	–
Batting average	–
100s/50s	–
Top score	–
Balls bowled	–
Wickets	–
Bowling average	–
5 wickets in innings	–
10 wickets in match	–
Best bowling	–
Catches/stumpings	–
- Source: ESPNcricinfo

Thelma Norma Meryl McKenzie (née Murden; 6 April 1915 – 12 March 2019) was an Australian Test cricket player.

== Biography ==
Thelma Murden was born in Wallerawang, New South Wales. She attended Lithgow High School and was prominent in sport in Lithgow. She married George McKenzie.

McKenzie played one Test for Australia in Wellington in 1948, but she did not bat, bowl or keep wicket. She also played against the touring England team and was New South Wales' regular wicket-keeper in state games. She played for the Annandale Cricket Club and worked for a dentist.

McKenzie died on 12 March 2019, at the age of 103.
