= Joyce Bath =

Australian cricketer

Cricket information
- Batting: Right-handed
- Bowling: Right-arm off-break

International information
- National side: Australia
- Test debut (cap 44): 18 January 1957 v New Zealand
- Last Test: 21 March 1958 v England

Career statistics
Competition	WTest
Matches	3
Runs scored	9
Batting average	4.50
100s/50s	0/0
Top score	8*
Balls bowled	334
Wickets	7
Bowling average	11.42
5 wickets in innings	0
10 wickets in match	0
Best bowling	5/52
Catches/stumpings	1/–
- Source: Cricinfo, 25 February 2015

Joyce Bath (27 February 1925 – 19 March 2006) was an Australian cricketer.

Having made her Test debut against New Zealand in 1957, Bath played three Test matches for the Australia national women's cricket team.
