= Eileen Massey =

Australian cricketer (1935–2019)

Personal information
- Born: 28 December 1935; Albany, Western Australia
- Died: 22 January 2019 (aged 83)
- Batting: Right-handed
- Bowling: Right-arm medium

International information
- National side: Australia
- Test debut (cap 42): 18 January 1957 v New Zealand
- Last Test: 8 March 1958 v England

Career statistics
| Competition | Test |
|---|---|
| Matches | 4 |
| Runs scored | 53 |
| Batting average | 17.66 |
| 100s/50s | 0/0 |
| Top score | 32 |
| Balls bowled | 504 |
| Wickets | 3 |
| Bowling average | 11.42 |
| 5 wickets in innings | 0 |
| 10 wickets in match | 0 |
| Best bowling | 2/26 |
| Catches/stumpings | 2/– |
- Source: Cricinfo, 27 February 2015

Eileen Mabel Uebergang (née Massey; 28 December 1935 – 22 January 2019) was an Australian cricket player. Massey played four Test matches for the Australia national women's cricket team.
