= Lorna Kettels =

Australian cricketer

Personal information
- Full name: Lorna Winifred Kettels
- Born: 5 April 1912; Nagambie, Victoria, Australia
- Died: 30 July 1997 (aged 85)

International information
- National side: Australia
- Test debut (cap 8): 28 December 1934 v England
- Last Test: 18 January 1935 v England

Career statistics
Competition	Test
Matches	2
Runs scored	19
Batting average	4.75
100s/50s	0/0
Top score	9
Balls bowled	132
Wickets	0
Bowling average	–
5 wickets in innings	0
10 wickets in match	0
Best bowling	–
Catches/stumpings	2/0
- Source: ESPNcricinfo, 3 March 2013

Lorna Winifred Kettels (5 April 1912 – 30 July 1997) was a former cricketer who played women's international cricket for Australia in 1934 and 1935. She played two women's Test matches for Australia, appearing in the very first women's Test match, against England in December 1934. A right-handed batsman and right-arm medium-fast bowler, she scored 19 runs and took no wickets in international cricket.
