= Florence McClintock =

Australian cricketer (1916–2008)

Flo McClintock
Personal information
- Born: 21 March 1916; New South Wales, Australia
- Died: 15 October 2008 (aged 92)
- Batting: Right-handed
- Bowling: Right arm fast
- Role: bowler

International information
- National side: Australia
- Test debut (cap 31): 15 January 1949 v England
- Last Test: 28 January 1949 v England

Career statistics
Competition	WTests
Matches	2
Runs scored	40
Batting average	13.33
100s/50s	0/0
Top score	20
Balls bowled	126
Wickets	8
Bowling average	?
5 wickets in innings	0
10 wickets in match	0
Best bowling	?
Catches/stumpings	0/-
- Source: CricInfo, 17 February 2015

Florence McClintock (or McLintock, 21 March 1916 – 15 October 2008) was an Australian cricket player. McClintock played two Test matches for the Australia national women's cricket team. McLintock married George Albert Bowe in October 1939. McClintock died on 15 October 2008, at the age of 92.
