= Sue Hilliam =

English cricketer (born 1941)

Personal information
- Full name: Susan Hilliam
- Born: 1941 (age 84–85); Yorkshire, England
- Role: Bowler

International information
- National side: England (1973)
- ODI debut (cap 5): 23 June 1973 v International XI
- Last ODI: 28 July 1973 v Australia

Domestic team information
- Years: Team
- 1963–1980: Yorkshire

Career statistics
Competition	WODI	WFC	WLA
Matches	4	7	9
Runs scored	1	105	89
Batting average	–	13.12	22.25
100s/50s	0/0	0/0	0/0
Top score	1*	23	41
Balls bowled	173	672	413
Wickets	6	8	12
Bowling average	12.66	28.75	13.16
5 wickets in innings	0	0	0
10 wickets in match	–	0	–
Best bowling	3/6	2/15	3/6
Catches/stumpings	1/–	2/–	2/–
- Source: CricketArchive, 13 March 2021

Susan Hilliam (born 1941) is an English former cricketer who played as a bowler. She appeared in four One Day Internationals for England in the 1973 Women's Cricket World Cup. She took six wickets at 12.66 with a best performance of three wickets for six runs as England won the tournament. She played domestic cricket for Yorkshire.
