= Daphne Robinson =

New Zealand cricketer

Personal information
- Full name: Daphne Maureen May Robinson
- Born: 16 February 1932; Dunedin, New Zealand
- Died: 7 February 2008 (aged 75); Dunedin, New Zealand
- Batting: Left-handed
- Bowling: Right-arm medium
- Role: All-rounder

International information
- National side: New Zealand (1961)
- Only Test (cap 43): 17 March 1961 v Australia

Domestic team information
- Years: Team
- 1950/51–1980/81: Otago

Career statistics
Competition	WTest	WFC	WLA
Matches	1	90	2
Runs scored	2	1,318	20
Batting average	–	10.29	20.00
100s/50s	0/0	0/3	0/0
Top score	2*	68	17*
Balls bowled	54	12,792	146
Wickets	1	229	2
Bowling average	16.00	18.65	17.00
5 wickets in innings	0	10	0
10 wickets in match	0	0	0
Best bowling	1/16	6/17	1/16
Catches/stumpings	0/–	13/–	1/–
- Source: CricketArchive, 23 November 2021

Daphne Maureen May Robinson (née Meek; 16 February 1932 – 7 February 2008) was a New Zealand cricketer who played as a right-arm medium bowler and left-handed batter. She appeared in one Test match for New Zealand in 1961. She played domestic cricket for Otago.
