= 2002–03 Women's National Cricket League season =

Cricket tournament

Women's National Cricket League 2002–03 season
- Dates: 9 November 2002 – 18 January 2003
- Administrator(s): Cricket Australia
- Cricket format: Limited overs cricket (50 overs)
- Tournament format(s): Group stage and finals series
- Champions: Victoria (1st title)
- Runners-up: New South Wales
- Participants: 5
- Matches: 22
- Player of the series: (South Australia) Karen Rolton
- Most runs: (South Australia) Karen Rolton (468)
- Most wickets: (Victoria (state)) Cathryn Fitzpatrick (17)
- Official website: cricket.com.au

The 2002–03 Women's National Cricket League season was the seventh season of the Women's National Cricket League, the women's domestic limited overs cricket competition in Australia. The tournament started on 9 November 2002 and finished on 18 January 2003. Victorian Spirit won the tournament for the first time after topping the ladder at the conclusion of the group stage and beating New South Wales Breakers by two games to zero in the finals series, ending the Breakers' six-tournament winning streak.

== Ladder ==
As of 12 January 2003

Pos	Team	Pld	W	L	T	NR	BP	Pts	NRR
1	Victoria	8	6	2	0	0	4	40	0.615
2	New South Wales	8	6	2	0	0	0	36	0.210
3	South Australia	8	5	3	0	0	4	34	0.713
4	Queensland	8	3	5	0	0	1	19	−0.344
5	Western Australia	8	0	8	0	0	0	0	−1.275

Updated to match(es) played on 12 January 2003. Source:
Rules for classification: The top two ranked teams qualified for the finals series.
- Points system: 6 for a win, 3 each for a tie or a no result, 0 for a loss, 1 each for an abandoned match.

== Fixtures ==
=== 1st final ===
17 January 2003
Scorecard

New South Wales; 6/200 (50 overs)	v	Victoria; 7/203 (50 overs)
Lisa Keightley 94* (156); Cathryn Fitzpatrick 3/31 (10 overs)		Belinda Clark 83 (137); Emma Liddell 1/23 (10 overs)

Victoria won by 3 wickets
Melbourne Cricket Ground
Umpires: Bob Parry and John Ward

- New South Wales won the toss and elected to bat.

=== 2nd final ===
18 January 2003
Scorecard

Victoria; 181 (50 overs)	v	New South Wales; 141 (47.3 overs)
Belinda Clark 63 (107); Julie Hayes 3/23 (10 overs)		Lisa Sthalekar 45 (61); Megan Pauwels 2/20 (4 overs)

Victoria won by 40 runs
Melbourne Cricket Ground
Umpires: Bob Parry and John Ward

- Victoria won the toss and elected to bat.
- Victoria won the 2002–03 Women's National Cricket League.
