= Loretta Bayliss =

New Zealand cricketer

Personal information
- Full name: Loretta Irene Bayliss
- Born: 1939; Christchurch, New Zealand
- Died: 30 June 1966 (aged 26–27); Christchurch, New Zealand
- Batting: Left-handed
- Bowling: Left-arm fast-medium
- Role: Bowler

International information
- National side: New Zealand (1961)
- Only Test (cap 41): 17 March 1961 v Australia

Domestic team information
- Years: Team
- 1956/57–1960/61: Canterbury

Career statistics
Competition	WTest	WFC
Matches	1	17
Runs scored	–	79
Batting average	–	4.93
100s/50s	–	0/0
Top score	–	19
Balls bowled	198	1,921
Wickets	5	43
Bowling average	14.00	13.81
5 wickets in innings	1	2
10 wickets in match	0	0
Best bowling	5/28	5/20
Catches/stumpings	0/–	6/–
- Source: CricketArchive, 23 November 2021

Loretta Irene Bayliss (1939 – 30 June 1966) was a New Zealand cricketer who played as a left-arm fast-medium bowler. She only appeared in a single Test match for New Zealand, in 1961. Playing against Australia, she took 5/28 in the final innings of the match to become the 6th player to take a five-wicket haul on their Women's Test debut. She played domestic cricket for Canterbury.
