= Margaret Jude =

Australian cricketer

Personal information
- Full name: Margaret Bowman Jude
- Born: 1 August 1940 (age 86); Adelaide, Australia
- Batting: Right-handed
- Role: Wicket-keeper

International information
- National sides: Australia (1963); International XI (1973)
- Only Test (cap 61): 20 July 1963; Australia v England
- ODI debut (cap 5): 23 June 1973; International XI v England
- Last ODI: 21 July 1973; International XI v Australia

Domestic team information
- Years: Team
- 1957/58–1974/75: South Australia

Career statistics
Competition	WTest	WODI	WFC
Matches	1	5	27
Runs scored	9	22	604
Batting average	4.50	7.33	16.77
100s/50s	0/0	0/0	0/1
Top score	5	17	86
Balls bowled	–	–	64
Wickets	–	–	2
Bowling average	–	–	14.00
5 wickets in innings	–	–	0
10 wickets in match	–	–	0
Best bowling	–	–	1/13
Catches/stumpings	2/2	3/0	20/8
- Source: CricketArchive, 13 March 2022

Margaret Bowman Jude (born 1 August 1940) is an Australian former cricketer who played as a wicket-keeper and right-handed batter. She appeared in one Test match for Australia in 1963, and five One Day Internationals for International XI at the 1973 World Cup. She played domestic cricket for South Australia, as well as playing in various friendly matches for Middlesex and Thames Valley.
