= Essie Shevill =

Australian cricketer

Personal information
- Full name: Essie Mabel Shevill
- Batting: Right-handed
- Bowling: Right-arm leg-spin
- Relatives: Rene Shevill (sister); Fernie Blade (sister)

International information
- National side: Australia
- Test debut (cap 5): 28 December 1934 v England
- Last Test: 18 January 1935 v England

Domestic team information
- Years: Team
- 1934/35: New South Wales women's cricket team

Career statistics
Competition	WTest
Matches	3
Runs scored	110
Batting average	22.00
100s/50s	0/1
Top score	63*
Balls bowled	90
Wickets	1
Bowling average	49.00
5 wickets in innings	0
10 wickets in match	0
Best bowling	1/39
Catches/stumpings	0/–
- Source: Cricinfo, 28 September 2014

Essie Shevill (6 April 1908 – 19 October 1989) was an Australian cricketer. Shevill played three Test matches for the Australia national women's cricket team.
