= Rene Shevill =

Australian cricketer

Personal information
- Full name: Irene Henrietta Shevill
- Batting: Right-handed
- Role: Wicket-keeper
- Relatives: Fernie Blade (twin sister); Essie Shevill (sister)

International information
- National side: Australia
- Test debut (cap 14): 4 January 1935 v England
- Last Test: 18 January 1935 v England

Career statistics
Competition	WTest
Matches	2
Runs scored	15
Batting average	7.50
100s/50s	0/0
Top score	10
Catches/stumpings	1/–
- Source: CricInfo, 11 September 2014

Rene Shevill (20 August 1910 – 10 May 1974) was an Australian cricketer. Shevill played two Tests for the Australia national women's cricket team. Rene Shevill was the fourteenth woman to play test cricket for Australia.
