= Joyce Christ =

Australian cricketer (1921–1997)

Joyce Christ (nee Mcculloch)
Cricket information
- Batting: Right-handed
- Bowling: Right arm fast-medium

International information
- National side: Australia
- Test debut (cap 32): 20 March 1949 v New Zealand
- Last Test: 17 March 1961 v New Zealand

Career statistics
Competition	WTests
Matches	8
Runs scored	255
Batting average	25.50
100s/50s	0/2
Top score	73
Balls bowled	594
Wickets	6
Bowling average	31.33
5 wickets in innings	0
10 wickets in match	0
Best bowling	1/7
Catches/stumpings	6/-
- Source: CricInfo, 16 February 2015

Joyce Isabella Christ nee McCulloch (7 March 1921 in Waverley, New South Wales – 17 October 1997 in Arncliffe, New South Wales) was an Australian cricket player. She played eight Test matches for the Australia national women's cricket team, over a 12-year period.
