= Lynn Denholm =

Australian cricketer (born 1939)

Personal information
- Born: 22 October 1939 (age 87); Melbourne, Victoria
- Batting: Right-handed
- Bowling: Right-arm leg-break

International information
- National side: Australia
- Test debut (cap 56): 15 June 1963 v England
- Last Test: 15 January 1977 v India

Career statistics
Competition	Test
Matches	8
Runs scored	349
Batting average	29.08
100s/50s	0/1
Top score	93
Balls bowled	301
Wickets	5
Bowling average	23.60
5 wickets in innings	0
10 wickets in match	0
Best bowling	4/46
Catches/stumpings	6/–
- Source: CricInfo, 23 March 2015

Lynn Denholm (born 22 October 1939) is a retired Australian cricket player. Denholm played eight Test matches for the Australia national women's cricket team.
