= Hazel Buck =

Australian cricketer (born 1932)

Personal information
- Full name: Hazel Doreen Buck
- Born: 28 March 1932 (age 94); Wyong, New South Wales
- Batting: Right-handed
- Bowling: Right-arm medium

International information
- National side: Australia
- Test debut (cap 58): 18 June 1963 v England
- Last Test: 20 July 1963 v England

Career statistics
Competition	Test
Matches	3
Runs scored	169
Batting average	33.80
100s/50s	0/0
Top score	47
Balls bowled	78
Wickets	2
Bowling average	5.50
5 wickets in innings	0
10 wickets in match	0
Best bowling	2/3
Catches/stumpings	1/–
- Source: CricInfo, 22 March 2015

Hazel Doreen Ronay (née Buck; born 8 March 1932) is an Australian former cricketer.

Buck's Test debut was against England, in June 1963. She played three Tests for the Australia national women's cricket team.
