= Helen Lee (cricketer) =

Australian cricketer (born 1943)

Personal information
- Born: 3 January 1943 (age 83)
- Batting: Right-handed
- Bowling: Left-arm medium-fast
- Relatives: Ross Taylor (husband)

International information
- National side: Australia
- Test debut (cap 60): 29 June 1963 v England
- Last Test: 20 July 1963 v England

Career statistics
Competition	WTest
Matches	2
Runs scored	60
Batting average	30.00
100s/50s	0/0
Top score	25*
Balls bowled	292
Wickets	4
Bowling average	17.50
5 wickets in innings	0
10 wickets in match	0
Best bowling	4/39
Catches/stumpings	2/–
- Source: CricInfo, 2 April 2015

Helen Lee (born 3 January 1943) is an Australian former cricketer. Lee played two Test matches for the Australia women's national cricket team. She was married to Ross Taylor, who played first-class cricket for New South Wales.
