= Mary Allitt =

Australian cricketer

Personal information
- Full name: Mary Loy (née Allitt)
- Born: 1 November 1925; Deniliquin, New South Wales, Australia
- Died: 10 December 2013 (aged 88); Australia
- Batting: Right-handed
- Bowling: Right-arm off-break
- Role: Batsman

International information
- National side: Australia
- Test debut (cap 35): 16 June 1951 v England
- Last Test: 20 July 1963 v England

Domestic team information
- Years: Team
- 1940s–1960s: New South Wales

Career statistics
Competition	Test
Matches	11
Runs scored	348
Batting average	17.40
100s/50s	0/1
Top score	76
Catches/stumpings	3/–
- Source: CricketArchive, 6 January 2014

Mary Loy (née Allitt) OAM (1 November 1925 – 10 December 2013) was an Australian cricketer who captained the national women's team on three occasions in 1963. She played 11 Tests, having made her debut against England in 1951, making a top score of 76. Her last Test was also against England. She also played for New South Wales.

On 23 August 2000, Allitt was awarded the Australian Sports Medal and on 1 January 2001, she was awarded the Centenary Medal for her contribution to cricket. Under her married name of Mary Loy she was awarded the Medal of the Order of Australia in June 2007 in recognition of her lifelong commitment to the game. Allitt died in December 2013, and was described as a "trailblazer" and "pioneer of women's cricket" in a Cricket Australia obituary.
