= Valma Batty =

Australian cricketer

Personal information
- Full name: Valma Lorraine Batty
- Born: 25 September 1928; Port Melbourne, Victoria, Australia
- Died: November 1995 (aged 67); South Melbourne, Victoria, Australia
- Batting: Right-handed

International information
- National side: Australia
- Test debut (cap 36): 16 June 1951 v England
- Last Test: 17 March 1961 v New Zealand

Career statistics
Competition	WTest
Matches	7
Runs scored	272
Batting average	24.72
100s/50s	0/2
Top score	70
Balls bowled	18
Wickets	0
Bowling average	–
5 wickets in innings	–
10 wickets in match	–
Best bowling	–
Catches/stumpings	0/–
- Source: Cricinfo, 25 February 2015

Valma Lorraine Batty (25 September 1928 – November 1995) was an Australian cricketer from Melbourne. Batty made her Test debut against England in 1951. In a Test career spanning a decade, she played seven Test matches for the Australia national women's cricket team.
