= Patricia Holmes (cricketer) =

Australian cricketer

Personal information
- Born: 17 March 1915
- Batting: Right-handed
- Bowling: Right arm medium pace, off-spin

International information
- National side: Australia
- Test debut: 12 June 1937 v England
- Last Test: 10 July 1937 v England

Career statistics
Competition	WTests
Matches	3
Runs scored	176
Batting average	29.33
100s/50s	0/1
Top score	70
Balls bowled	222
Wickets	2
Bowling average	42.50
5 wickets in innings	0
10 wickets in match	0
Best bowling	1/6
Catches/stumpings	0/–
- Source: CricInfo, 30 November 2014

Patricia Holmes (17 March 1915 – 1992) was an Australian cricket player. Holmes played three test matches for the Australia national women's cricket team.
