= Doris Turner (cricketer) =

English cricketer and umpire

Doris Coysh
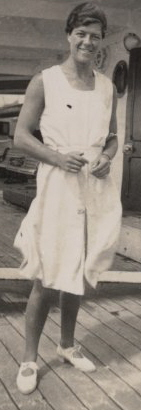

Personal information
- Full name: Doris Mildred Coysh
- Born: 3 March 1908; Weobley, Herefordshire, England
- Died: April 1986 (aged 78); Wandsworth, Greater London, England
- Role: Bowler

International information
- National side: England (1934–1935)
- Test debut (cap 10): 28 December 1934 v Australia
- Last Test: 18 February 1935 v New Zealand

Domestic team information
- Years: Team
- 1937: Middlesex
- 1949–1951: Kent
- 1953: Sussex

Umpiring information
- WTests umpired: 2 (1963–1966)

Career statistics
Competition	WTest	WFC
Matches	4	14
Runs scored	17	175
Batting average	5.66	10.29
100s/50s	0/0	0/1
Top score	9	50
Balls bowled	222	1,287
Wickets	1	21
Bowling average	46.00	22.90
5 wickets in innings	–	0
10 wickets in match	–	0
Best bowling	1/12	3/11
Catches/stumpings	1/–	4/–
- Source: CricketArchive, 11 March 2021

Doris Mildred Coysh (née Turner; 3 March 1908 – April 1986) was an English cricketer and umpire. She played primarily as a bowler. She appeared in the first four Test matches in England's history, in 1934 and 1935. She also umpired two Tests, in 1963 and 1966. She played domestic cricket for Middlesex, Kent and Sussex.

== Career ==
Turner was a member of the England women's cricket team that travelled to Australia in 1934 and 1935 for the first Women's Test cricket series. Making her Test debut in the first match starting 28 December 1934, she played all four Test matches in the series. In 1959, Turner became the first women's cricket umpire. She later umpired two women's Test matches, in 1963 and 1966.

== Personal life ==
Coysh was born Doris Mildred Turner in 1908. In 1936, Turner married Arthur William Henry Coysh (1896–1992).
