= Joyce Goldsmith =

Australian cricketer

Personal information
- Born: 8 January 1942 (age 84); Melbourne, Australia
- Batting: Left-handed
- Bowling: Right-arm fast

International information
- National side: Australia
- Test debut (cap 64): 27 December 1968 v England
- Last Test: 25 January 1969 v England

Career statistics
Competition	Test
Matches	3
Runs scored	129
Batting average	32.25
100s/50s	0/1
Top score	58
Balls bowled	501
Wickets	3
Bowling average	17.50
5 wickets in innings	0
10 wickets in match	0
Best bowling	2/68
Catches/stumpings	3/–
- Source: CricInfo, 19 April 2015

Joyce Goldsmith (born 8 January 1942) is an Australian former cricket player. Goldsmith played three Test matches for the Australia women's national cricket team.
