= Kit Raymond =

Australian cricketer

Personal information
- Full name: Kit Arthurine Raymond
- Born: 21 May 1930; Winton, Queensland
- Died: 25 January 2009 (aged 78)
- Batting: Right-handed
- Role: Wicketkeeper

International information
- National side: Australia
- Test debut (cap 40): 18 January 1957 v New Zealand
- Last Test: 17 March 1961 v New Zealand

Career statistics
Competition	Test
Matches	2
Runs scored	11
Batting average	3.66
100s/50s	0/0
Top score	6
Balls bowled	6
Wickets	0
Bowling average	–
5 wickets in innings	–
10 wickets in match	–
Best bowling	–
Catches/stumpings	1/0
- Source: CricInfo, 1 March 2015

Kit Arthurine Raymond (21 May 1930 – 25 January 2009) was an Australian cricket player. Raymond played two Test matches for the Australia national women's cricket team.
