= Liz Amos =

Australian former cricket player

Personal information
- Full name: Elizabeth Amos
- Batting: Left-handed
- Bowling: Right-arm

International information
- National side: Australia
- Test debut (cap 53): 17 March 1961 v New Zealand
- Last Test: 20 July 1963 v England

Career statistics
Competition	Test
Matches	4
Runs scored	182
Batting average	30.33
100s/50s	0/1
Top score	55
Balls bowled	12
Wickets	0
Bowling average	–
5 wickets in innings	–
10 wickets in match	–
Best bowling	–
Catches/stumpings	0/–
- Source: CricInfo, 11 March 2015

Elizabeth Amos (born 26 May 1938) is an Australian former cricketer. Amos played four Test matches for the Australia national women's cricket team.
