= Lorraine Kutcher =

Australian cricketer (born 1938)

Personal information
- Born: 22 January 1938 (age 88); Sunshine, Victoria
- Batting: Right-handed
- Bowling: Right-arm medium-fast

International information
- National side: Australia
- Test debut (cap 59): 15 June 1963 v England
- Last Test: 15 January 1969 v England

Career statistics
Competition	Test
Matches	4
Runs scored	68
Batting average	22.66
100s/50s	0/1
Top score	52
Balls bowled	881
Wickets	16
Bowling average	18.62
5 wickets in innings	2
10 wickets in match	0
Best bowling	6/68
Catches/stumpings	1/–
- Source: CricInfo, 27 March 2015

Lorraine Kutcher (born 29 January 1938) is an Australian former cricket player.

Kutcher played four Test matches for the Australia national women's cricket team.
