= Norma Wilson (cricketer) =

Australian cricketer

Cricket information
- Batting: Right-handed
- Role: Wicket-keeper

International information
- National side: Australia
- Test debut (cap 52): 17 March 1961 v New Zealand
- Last Test: 29 June 1963 v England

Career statistics
Competition	WTest
Matches	3
Runs scored	19
Batting average	3.80
100s/50s	0/0
Top score	9
Catches/stumpings	6/1
- Source: CricInfo, 16 March 2015

Norma Wilson (14 September 1929 – 15 January 2022) was an Australian cricketer. Wilson played three tests for the Australia national women's cricket team.

Wilson died in January 2022, aged 92.
