= Muriel Picton =

Australian cricketer

Cricket information
- Batting: Right-handed
- Bowling: Right-arm offbreak

International information
- National side: Australia
- Test debut (cap 53): 17 March 1961 v New Zealand
- Last Test: 25 January 1969 v England

Career statistics
Competition	Test
Matches	7
Runs scored	111
Batting average	18.50
100s/50s	0/0
Top score	29
Balls bowled	818
Wickets	8
Bowling average	38.12
5 wickets in innings	0
10 wickets in match	0
Best bowling	2/40
Catches/stumpings	5/–
- Source: Cricinfo, 13 March 2015

Muriel Picton AM is an Australian former cricketer who captained the Australia national women's cricket team on four occasions. She was born on 31 October 1930 in Singleton, New South Wales and made her Test debut against New Zealand, at Dunedin in March 1961. She played her last test against England in 1969. In 7 matches overall she scored 111 runs and took 8 wickets with her off breaks. She played state cricket for New South Wales Women.

Picton was appointed a Member of the Order of Australia (AM) in the 2022 Queen's Birthday Honours for "significant service to cricket as a player, administrator and coach".
