= Miriam Knee =

Australian cricketer

Personal information
- Born: 19 January 1938 (age 88); Ringwood, Victoria, Australia
- Batting: Left-handed
- Bowling: Right-arm

International information
- National side: Australia
- Test debut (cap 54): 17 March 1961 v New Zealand
- Last Test: 5 February 1972 v New Zealand
- ODI debut (cap 5): 23 June 1973 v Young England
- Last ODI: 28 July 1973 v England

Career statistics
Competition	Test	ODI
Matches	8	6
Runs scored	319	86
Batting average	26.58	28.66
100s/50s	0/3	0/0
Top score	96	30*
Balls bowled	2,274	282
Wickets	35	8
Bowling average	16.28	16.25
5 wickets in innings	2	0
10 wickets in match	0	0
Best bowling	5/35	4/26
Catches/stumpings	4/–	2/–
- Source: Cricinfo, 14 November 2007

Miriam Knee OAM (born 19 January 1938) is an Australian former cricketer who played eight women's Test matches and six women's One Day Internationals for the Australia national women's cricket team. She was awarded the Medal of the Order of Australia in the 2023 King's Birthday Honours List for her contribution to cricket and the community.
