= Marjorie Marvell =

Australian cricketer (born 1938)

Personal information
- Full name: Marjorie Evelyn Marvell
- Batting: Right-handed
- Bowling: Left-arm fast

International information
- National side: Australia
- Test debut (cap 49): 8 March 1958 v England
- Last Test: 21 March 1958 v England

Career statistics
Competition	WTest
Matches	5
Runs scored	22
Batting average	7.33
100s/50s	0/0
Top score	15
Balls bowled	1230
Wickets	6
Bowling average	50.83
5 wickets in innings	0
10 wickets in match	0
Best bowling	2/40
Catches/stumpings	4/–
- Source: CricInfo, 9 March 2015

Marjorie Marvell (born 7 July 1938) is an Australian former cricketer. Making her Test debut against England, Marvell played five Test matches for the Australia national women's cricket team.
