= Patricia Thomson =

Australian cricketer

Personal information
- Full name: Patricia Ann Thomson
- Born: 26 November 1937; Leeton, New South Wales
- Died: October 2024 (aged 86)
- Batting: Right-handed
- Bowling: Right-arm Off-spin

International information
- National side: Australia
- Test debut (cap 55): 17 March 1961 v New Zealand
- Last Test: 20 July 1963 v England

Career statistics
Competition	Test
Matches	4
Runs scored	107
Batting average	26.75
100s/50s	0/0
Top score	30
Balls bowled	420
Wickets	2
Bowling average	73.50
5 wickets in innings	0
10 wickets in match	0
Best bowling	2/39
Catches/stumpings	3/–
- Source: CricketArchive, 9 August 2025

Patricia Ann Thomson (26 November 1937 – October 2024) was an Australian cricket player. Born in Leeton, New South Wales, her family moved to Sydney when she was three where she began playing cricket as a teenager. On her Test debut against New Zealand in 1961, she scored 31 runs and took two wickets for 41 runs. Thomson played four Tests for the Australia national women's cricket team. Outside cricket, she worked for the Northern Territory Police Force.

Thomson died in October 2024, at the age of 86.
