= Janice Parker =

Australian cricketer

Personal information
- Full name: Janice Lovenia Parker
- Born: 13 November 1937; Australia
- Died: 9 February 2025 (aged 87); Bendigo, Victoria, Australia
- Batting: Right-handed
- Bowling: Right-arm medium

International information
- National side: Australia
- Test debut (cap 57): 15 June 1963 v England
- Last Test: 25 January 1969 v England

Career statistics
Competition	Test
Matches	5
Runs scored	172
Batting average	24.57
100s/50s	0/2
Top score	60
Balls bowled	92
Wickets	3
Bowling average	11.33
5 wickets in innings	2
10 wickets in match	0
Best bowling	2/13
Catches/stumpings	3/–
- Source: CricInfo, 9 August 2025

Janice Lavinia Parker (née Wady; 13 November 1937 – 9 February 2025) was an Australian cricketer. She played five Tests for the Australia national women's cricket team in the 1960s.
