= Australia women's cricket team in England in 1951 =

Australian women's cricket team in England in 1951
| | England | Australia |
- Dates: 19 May – 4 August 1951
| Captains | Myrtle Maclagan (1st & 2nd Tests); Molly Hide (3rd Test) | Mollie Dive |

Test series
- Result: 3-match series drawn 1–1
| Most runs | Cecilia Robinson (201) | Betty Wilson (175); Amy Hudson (175) |
| Most wickets | Mary Duggan (20) | Betty Wilson (16) |

The Australian women's cricket team toured England between May and August 1951. The test series against England women's cricket team was played for the Women's Ashes, which Australia were defending. The series was drawn 1–1, meaning that Australia retained the Ashes.

== Squads ==
| England | Australia |
|---|---|
| Myrtle Maclagan (c); Betty Birch; Mary Duggan; Annie Geeves; Molly Hide; Mary Johnson; Winifred Leech; Margaret Lockwood (wk); Dorothy McEvoy; Grace Morgan (wk); Barbara Murrey; Cecilia Robinson; Hazel Sanders; Mary Spry; Joan Wilkinson | Mollie Dive (c); Mary Allitt; Valma Batty; Myrtle Baylis; Ruth Dow; Amy Hudson; June James; Mavis Jones; Lorna Larter (wk); Dot Laughton; Una Paisley; Gladys Phillips; Joan Schmidt; Alma Vogt; Norma Whiteman; Betty Wilson |

== Tour Matches ==
=== Single innings matches ===
30 May 1951
Scorecard

| Australia; 153/6d (52 overs) | v | Buckinghamshire and Leicestershire; 62 (40 overs) |
| Betty Wilson 33 (–); L Freestone 2/23 (12 overs) | | L Freestone 16* (–); Betty Wilson 3/12 (8 overs) |

Australia Women won by 91 runs
Wilton Park, Beaconsfield
Umpires: Isabel Nowell-Smith (Eng) and E White (Eng)

- Australia Women won the toss and elected to bat.

2 June 1951
Scorecard

| Australia; 237/3d (65 overs) | v | Yorkshire; 108 (50 overs) |
| Betty Wilson 100* (–); B Nelson 1/20 (5 overs) | | Mona Greenwood 34 (–); Betty Wilson 5/15 (12 overs) |

Australia Women won by 129 runs
Headingley Cricket Ground, Leeds
Umpires: Fawell (Eng) and Roker (Eng)

- Australia Women won the toss and elected to bat.

5 June 1951
Scorecard

| Australia; 161/1d (53 overs) | v | Northern Counties; 181/9 (68 overs) |
| Mary Allitt 80 (–); Dorothy Macfarlane 1/56 (15 overs) | | H Mullen 65 (–); Mavis Jones 3/29 (13 overs) |

Northern Counties Women won by 3 wickets
Osborne Avenue, Jesmond
Umpires: Alys Iceton (Eng) and Barbara Wood (Eng)

- Australia Women won the toss and elected to bat.
- Northern Counties Women batted on after winning.

13 June 1951
Scorecard

| Australia; 203/5d (65 overs) | v | Warwickshire and Nottinghamshire; 97/9 (55 overs) |
| Mary Allitt 82 (–); Annie Geeves 3/79 (26 overs) | | Constance Holden 31 (–); Una Paisley 4/23 (16 overs) |

Match drawn
Edgbaston Cricket Ground, Birmingham
Umpires: M Bloom (Eng) and V Brain (Eng)

- Australia Women won the toss and elected to bat.

27 June 1951
Scorecard

| Australia; 218/0d (47 overs) | v | West of England; 56 (45.1 overs) |
| Mary Allitt 150* (–) | | J Bond 12 (–); Betty Wilson 3/19 (7 overs) |

Australia Women won by 162 runs
The Victoria Ground, Cheltenham
Umpires: V Brain (Eng) and MJ Townsend (Eng)

- Australia Women won the toss and elected to bat.

5 July 1951
Scorecard

| Dorset and Hampshire; 80 (46.1 overs) | v | Australia; 304/7 (70.2 overs) |
| Nancy Joy 31 (–); Myrtle Baylis 3/1 (9 overs) | | Dot Laughton 103 (–); Kay Green 3/59 (10 overs) |

Australia Women won by 8 wickets
King George V Sports Ground, Winchester
Umpires: M Bloom (Eng) and Norah Wilcox (Eng)

- Australia Women won the toss and elected to field.
- Australia Women batted on after winning.

11 July 1951
Scorecard

| Surrey; 172 (61.2 overs) | v | Australia; 120/6 (61 overs) |
| Jean Cummins 35 (–); Una Paisley 3/54 (20 overs) | | Amy Hudson 51* (–); Dorothy McEvoy 2/22 (16 overs) |

Match drawn
Mitcham Cricket Green, Mitcham
Umpires: M Oliver (Eng) and Enid Stephenson (Eng)

- Surrey Women won the toss and elected to bat.

16 July 1951
Scorecard

| Australia; 297/1d (49 overs) | v | Oxfordshire, Berkshire and Sussex; 107 (57.1 overs) |
| Gladys Phillips 130* (–); Iris Doble 1/39 (11 overs) | | Joan Wilkinson 33 (–); Mavis Jones 3/7 (9 overs) |

Australia Women won by 190 runs
Christ Church Ground, Oxford
Umpires: M Bloom (Eng) and Norah Wilcox (Eng)

- Oxfordshire, Berkshire and Sussex Women won the toss and elected to field.

18 July 1951
Scorecard

| Australia; 206/4d (59 overs) | v | Middlesex; 129/8 (59 overs) |
| Mary Allitt 84 (–); Mary Duggan 3/56 (22 overs) | | Betty Birch 34 (–); Alma Vogt 3/22 (11 overs) |

Match drawn
Ealing Dean Cricket Club, Perivale, London
Umpires: M Bloom (Eng) and Doris Turner (Eng)

- Middlesex Women won the toss and elected to field.

25 July 1951
Scorecard

| Combined Services; 160 (63.3 overs) | v | Australia; 209/4 (37 overs) |
| Joan Wilkinson 112 (–); June James 4/30 (13.3 overs) | | Mollie Dive 128 (–); A Simpson 2/40 (9 overs) |

Australia Women won by 8 wickets
Officers Club Services Ground, Aldershot
Umpires: Louie Hibbs (Eng) and B Lloyd (Eng)

- Australia Women won the toss and elected to field.
- Australia Women batted on after winning.

4 August 1951
Scorecard

| Australia; 213 (60 overs) | v | ME Hide's XI; 193/6 (49 overs) |
| Una Paisley 72 (–); Mary Duggan 4/61 (24 overs) | | Myrtle Maclagan 81 (–); Una Paisley 3/55 (12 overs) |

Match drawn
Hindhead Playing Field, Hindhead
Umpires: Netta Rheinberg (Eng) and Enid Stevenson (Eng)

- ME Hide's XI won the toss and elected to field.

=== Two innings matches ===
19 May 1951
Scorecard

| Kent | v | Australia |
| 70 (33.1 overs); Doris Turner 20 (–); Norma Whiteman 3/9 (8.1 overs) | | 165/7d (46.3 overs); Mollie Dive 59 (–); Doris Turner 4/57 (19 overs) |
| 53/5 (27 overs); Cecilia Robinson 37* (–); Norma Whiteman 2/15 (7 overs) |

Match drawn
Vine Cricket Ground, Sevenoaks
Umpires: Isabel Nowell-Smith (Eng) and Enid Stevenson (Eng)

- Australia Women won the toss and elected to field.
- Australia Women won by 7 wickets on first innings.

23 May 1951
Scorecard

| Australia | v | Lincolnshire, Essex and Hertfordshire |
| 193/2d (53 overs); Joan Schmidt 85 (–); Joan Robinson 1/31 (9 overs) | | 56 (34.5 overs); Sue Sutherland 16 (–); Myrtle Baylis 6/8 (7.5 overs) |
| | | 50/5 (16 overs) (f/o); Joan Robinson 19 (–); Una Paisley 1/7 (3 overs) |

Match drawn
Richmond Drive, Skegness
Umpires: Ida Freestone (Eng) and Elizabeth Riley (Eng)

- Australia Women won the toss and elected to bat.
- Australia Women won by 137 runs on first innings.

25 – 26 May 1951
Scorecard

| Australia | v | East of England |
| 309/4d (85 overs); Valma Batty 112* (–); D Knowler 1/16 (3 overs) | | 82 (44.1 overs); Joan Smith 16 (–); Betty Wilson 3/14 (6 overs) |
| 59/5d (22 overs); Alma Vogt 21 (–); Mickey Bradley 3/14 (4 overs) | | 92/1 (39 overs); Cecilia Robinson 40* (–); Amy Hudson 1/13 (4 overs) |

Match drawn
Clarence Park, St Albans
Umpires: Ida Freestone (Eng) and Norah Wilcox (Eng)

- Australia Women won the toss and elected to bat.

8 – 9 June 1951
Scorecard

| Australia | v | North of England |
| 282 (95 overs); Betty Wilson 98 (–); Ivy Bewley 2/43 (13 overs) | | 127 (46.2 overs); Mary Johnson 33 (–); Betty Wilson 3/31 (14 overs) |
| | | 114 (51.3 overs) (f/o); Joan Stephens 27 (–); Betty Wilson 3/33 (13.3 overs) |

Australia Women won by an innings and 41 runs
Old Trafford Cricket Ground, Manchester
Umpires: Barbara Wood (Eng) and Norah Wilcox (Eng)

- Australia Women won the toss and elected to bat.

23, 25 June 1951
Scorecard

| Midlands | v | Australia |
| 82 (50 overs); B Beacham 20 (–); June James 3/27 (20 overs) | | 335/6d (121 overs); Una Paisley 104 (–); B Bonham 2/31 (9 overs) |
| 199/5 (84 overs); Eileen White 79 (–); Mollie Dive 2/31 (5 overs) |

Match drawn
Trent Bridge, Nottingham
Umpires: Elizabeth Riley (Eng) and Norah Wilcox (Eng)

- Midlands Women won the toss and elected to bat.

7, 9 July 1951
Scorecard

| Australia | v | West of England |
| 261/2d (88.3 overs); Joan Schmidt 122* (–); Nancy Joy 1/18 (3 overs) | | 110 (79.2 overs); Nancy Joy 22 (–); Betty Wilson 3/13 (17 overs) |
| | | 141 (67.3 overs) (f/o); Kay Green 37 (–); June James 4/33 (17.3 overs) |

Australia Women won by an innings and 10 runs
Dean Park Cricket Ground, Bournemouth
Umpires: M Bloom (Eng) and E White (Eng)

- Australia Women won the toss and elected to bat.

13 – 14 July 1951
Scorecard

| England Women Australia Touring Team | v | Australia |
| 199 (67 overs); Cecilia Robinson 87 (–); Una Paisley 6/43 (15 overs) | | 179 (63.4 overs); Valma Batty 61* (–); Mary Duggan 5/76 (21 overs) |
| 133/9d (43 overs); Mary Hide 77 (–); Betty Wilson 3/25 (9 overs) | | 158/6 (50.3 overs); Lorna Larter 40* (–); Myrtle Maclagan 4/31 (13 overs) |

Match drawn
Chalkwell Park, Southend-on-Sea
Umpires: M Oliver (Eng) and Enid Stevenson (Eng)

- England Women Australia Touring Team won the toss and elected to bat.

21, 23 July 1951
Scorecard

| Australia | v | South of England |
| 262 (87 overs); Una Paisley 99* (–); Mary Duggan 4/54 (27 overs) | | 214/9d (88 overs); Mary Hide 37 (–); Mavis Jones 2/30 (15 overs) |
| 93/3d (35 overs); Mollie Dive 47 (–); Myrtle Maclagan 1/8 (5 overs) | | 80/3 (19 overs); Hazel Sanders 34 (–); Mavis Jones 2/37 (10 overs) |

Match drawn
The Saffrons, Eastbourne
Umpires: Netta Rheinberg (Eng) and Enid Stevenson (Eng)

- Australia Women won the toss and elected to bat.

== Test Series ==
=== 1st Test ===
16 – 20 June 1951
Scorecard

| England | v | Australia |
| 283 (154 overs); Cecilia Robinson 105 (–); Amy Hudson 2/21 (10 overs) | | 248 (98 overs); Betty Wilson 81 (–); Myrtle Maclagan 5/43 (28 overs) |
| 178/8d (75.3 overs); Cecilia Robinson 36 (–); Myrtle Baylis 2/39 (22 overs) | | 111/2 (47 overs); Amy Hudson 48* (–); Winifred Leech 1/23 (11 overs) |

Match drawn
North Marine Road Ground, Scarborough
Umpires: Elizabeth Riley (Eng) and Isabel Nowell-Smith (Eng)

- England Women won the toss and elected to bat.
- Annie Geeves, Winifred Leech, Margaret Lockwood, Barbara Murrey, Mary Spry (Eng), Mary Allitt, Valma Batty and Mavis Jones (Aus) all made their WTest debuts.

=== 2nd Test ===
30 June – 4 July 1951
Scorecard

| England | v | Australia |
| 158 (73.3 overs); Barbara Murrey 39* (–); Betty Wilson 3/40 (20 overs) | | 120 (72.2 overs); Joan Schmidt 42 (–); Mary Duggan 5/40 (22.2 overs) |
| 120 (55.3 overs); Barbara Murrey 34 (–); Betty Wilson 4/42 (15.3 overs) | | 160/8 (60.5 overs); Betty Wilson 35 (–); Mary Duggan 4/68 (24 overs) |

Australia Women won by 2 wickets
New Road, Worcester
Umpires: Ida Freestone (Eng) and Betty Snowball (Eng)

- England Women won the toss and elected to bat.

=== 3rd Test ===
28 July – 1 August 1951
Scorecard

| England | v | Australia |
| 238 (98 overs); Molly Hide 65 (–); Norma Whiteman 4/56 (31 overs) | | 192 (110 overs); Norma Whiteman 36* (–); Mary Duggan 4/74 (37 overs) |
| 174/7d (74 overs); Molly Hide 42 (–); June James 2/33 (16 overs) | | 83 (59.4 overs); Amy Hudson 17* (–); Mary Duggan 5/30 (20 overs) |

England Women won by 137 runs
The Oval, London
Umpires: Enid Stevenson (Eng) and Elizabeth Riley (Eng)

- England Women won the toss and elected to bat.
- Betty Birch (Eng) and June James (Aus) made their WTest debuts.
