= England women's cricket team in Australia and New Zealand in 1948–49 =

The England women's cricket team toured Australia and New Zealand from January to March 1949, playing three Test matches against Australia, followed by one against New Zealand. The series against Australia was retrospectively recognised as the third series of the Women's Ashes; England entered the series as notional holders of the Ashes, having won the first series in 1934–35, and retained them by drawing the second series, in 1937. Australia claimed their first series victory over England in 1949, winning 1–0, with two drawn matches.

== Australia Test series ==
=== 1st Test ===
15–18 January 1949
Scorecard

Australia	v	England
213 (81.3 overs); Betty Wilson 111; Molly Hide 3/24 (10 overs)		72 (84.5 overs); Cecilia Robinson 34; Betty Wilson 6/23 (26.5 overs)
173/5 dec (71 overs); Amy Hudson 81; Myrtle Maclagan 2/42 (16 overs)		128 (62.3 overs); Molly Hide 30; Norma Whiteman 4/33 (19 overs)

Australia won by 186 runs
Adelaide Oval, Adelaide

- Australia won the toss and elected to bat.
- Flo McClintock, Joyce Christ, Alma Vogt (Aus), Cecilia Robinson, Mary Duggan, Netta Rheinberg, Hazel Sanders, Dorothy McEvoy, Megan Lowe and Mary Johnson (Eng) all made their Women Test debuts.
- No play on Sunday 16 January, which was a rest day

=== 2nd Test ===
28–31 January 1949
Scorecard

Australia	v	England
265 (112.1 overs); Joyce Christ 42; Megan Lowe 3/34 (26 overs)		118 (81.1 overs); Cecilia Robinson 41; Betty Wilson 4/25 (21 overs)
158/4 dec (42 overs); Betty Wilson 74; Myrtle Maclagan 3/69 (17 overs)		171/7 (112 overs); Myrtle Maclagan 77; Amy Hudson 2/37 (19 overs)

Match drawn
Melbourne Cricket Ground, Melbourne

- Australia won the toss and elected to bat.
- Joan Wilkinson and Barbara Wood (Eng) both made their Women's Test debuts.
- No play on Sunday 30 January, which was a rest day

=== 3rd Test ===
19–22 February 1949
Scorecard

England	v	Australia
172 (97.1 overs); Molly Hide 63; Amy Hudson 3/11 (5 overs)		272 (133 overs); Amy Hudson 55; Myrtle Maclagan 4/67 (38 overs)
205/4 (115 overs); Molly Hide 124*; Norma Whiteman 1/29 (16 overs)

Match drawn
Sydney Cricket Ground, Sydney

- England won the toss and elected to bat.
- Dot Laughton (Aus) made her Women's test debut.
- No play on Sunday 20 February, which was a rest day

== New Zealand Test series ==
=== Test Match ===
26–29 March 1949
Scorecard

England	v	New Zealand
204 (103.2 overs); Hazel Sanders 54; Grace Gooder 6/42 (23.2 overs)		61 (55.2 overs); Joan Francis 19; Dorothy McEvoy 5/23 (19.2 overs)
164/7 dec (73 overs); Myrtle Maclagan 47; Phyl Blackler 2/16 (12 overs)		122 (86.3 overs); Una Wickham 34; Mary Duggan 3/21 (22 overs)

England won by 185 runs
Eden Park, Auckland

- England won the toss and elected to bat.
- No play on Sunday 27 March, which was a rest day
