= List of centuries in women's Test cricket =

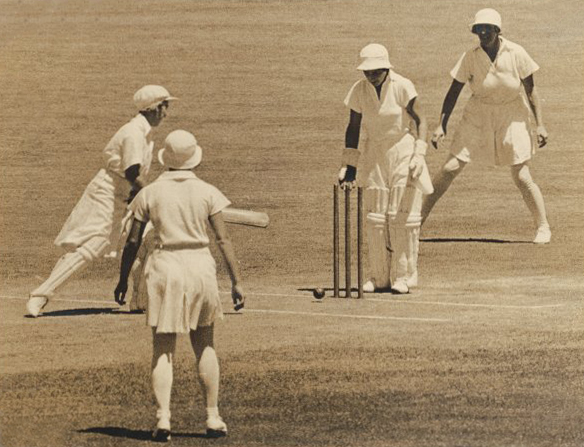
Second women's Test match between Australia and England in Sydney in 1935; Myrtle Maclagan (not pictured) scored the first century in women's Test cricket during this match while Betty Snowball (wicketkeeper, third from left) scored a century two Tests later.

Test cricket is the longest version of the sport of cricket. Test matches are played between international teams of eleven players each over four innings; each team bats twice. In the women's variant, the game is scheduled to last four days of play. The Women's Cricket Association was formed in England in 1926, and the first women's Test was played between England and Australia in 1934. The English team were on a tour of Australia and New Zealand, arranged by the WCA. The International Women's Cricket Council was formed in 1958 as the governing body for women's cricket. In 2005, women's cricket was brought under the International Cricket Council along with men's cricket; at that time 89 of the council's 104 members had started developing women's cricket. As of March 2026, a total of ten teams have played a total of 154 women's Test matches and 2 matches were abandoned. England have played the most matches (102) while Sri Lanka, Ireland and the Netherlands have played only one Test each.

A century is a score of a hundred or more runs in an innings. The first century in women's Test cricket was scored in 1935 by Myrtle Maclagan, who made 119 runs for England against Australia. Since then, a total of 119 centuries, including nine double centuries, have been scored. Betty Snowball of England (189 runs) held the record for the highest individual score for over 51 years. She was the second cricketer to hold the record after Maclagan, a record which stood until Sandhya Agarwal of India surpassed it by a single run in 1986. Following Agarwal the record was held by Denise Annetts (Australia, 1987), Kirsty Flavell (New Zealand, 1996), Karen Rolton (Australia, 2001), Mithali Raj (India, 2002), and the current record holder Kiran Baluch of Pakistan who, in 2004, scored 242 runs against the West Indies. Janette Brittin of England has scored five centuries in a Test career spanning 27 matches and 44 innings, the most hundreds in women's Test match history. Flavell scored the first double century in women's Test cricket in 1996; later nine more double centuries were scored, by Joanne Broadbent (Australia, 1998), Michelle Goszko (Australia, 2001), Karen Rolton (Australia, 2001), Mithali Raj (India, 2002), Kiran Baluch (Pakistan, 2004), Ellyse Perry (Australia, 2017) and Shafali Verma (India, 2024). As of January 2025, Australia and England have the most centurions (25 players each) while English players have scored the most centuries (47 times).

The first part of this list includes all players who have scored a Test century. The list is organised in chronological order; in cases where more than one player has scored a century in the same match or innings, the player who started batting earlier is listed first. The second part of the list provides an overview of century scores by Test playing teams. Teams are listed in the order of debut; in cases where two teams played their first match together, the host team is listed first.

== Key ==
Symbol	Meaning
Runs	Number of runs scored
*	Batsman remained not out
BF	Number of balls faced
4s	Number of fours hit
6s	Number of sixes hit
SR	Runs scored per 100 balls
Inn	Innings in which the score was made
–	Statistic was not recorded
†	Score was a world record at that time

== Centuries ==
List of centuries in women's Test cricket
No.	Player	Runs	BF	4s	6s	SR	Inns	Team	Opposition	Date	Ground	Result
1	Myrtle Maclagan † (1/2)	119	–	5	0	–	2	England	Australia	4 January 1935	Sydney Cricket Ground, Sydney	Won
2	Betty Snowball †	189	–	23	0	–	2	England	New Zealand	16 February 1935	Lancaster Park, Christchurch	Won
3	Molly Hide (1/2)	110	–	5	0	–	2	England	New Zealand	16 February 1935	Lancaster Park, Christchurch	Won
4	Myrtle Maclagan (2/2)	115	–	0	0	–	1	England	Australia	26 June 1937	Stanley Park, Blackpool	Won
5	Una Paisley (1/2)	108	–	10	0	–	1	Australia	New Zealand	20 March 1948	Basin Reserve, Wellington	Won
6	Betty Wilson (1/3)	111	–	12	0	–	1	Australia	England	15 January 1949	Adelaide Oval, Adelaide	Won
7	Molly Hide (2/2)	124*	–	–	0	–	3	England	Australia	19 February 1949	Sydney Cricket Ground, Sydney	Drawn
8	Cecilia Robinson (1/2)	105	–	8	0	–	1	England	Australia	16 June 1951	North Marine Road, Scarborough	Drawn
9	Una Paisley (2/2)	101	–	0	0	–	1	Australia	New Zealand	18 January 1957	Adelaide Oval, Adelaide	Won
10	Mary Duggan (1/2)	108	–	12	0	–	2	England	New Zealand	29 November 1957	Lancaster Park, Christchurch	Drawn
11	Betty Wilson (2/3)	100	–	3	0	–	3	Australia	England	21 February 1958	Junction Oval, Melbourne	Drawn
12	Betty Wilson (3/3)	127	–	6	0	–	1	Australia	England	8 March 1958	Adelaide Oval, Adelaide	Drawn
13	Cecilia Robinson (2/2)	102	–	0	0	–	2	England	Australia	8 March 1958	Adelaide Oval, Adelaide	Drawn
14	Helen Sharpe	126	–	7	0	–	2	England	South Africa	31 December 1960	Kingsmead, Durban	Won
15	Yvonne van Mentz	105*	–	7	0	–	2	South Africa	England	13 January 1961	Newlands, Cape Town	Drawn
16	Mary Duggan (2/2)	101*	–	–	0	–	1	England	Australia	20 July 1963	The Oval, London	Won
17	Rachael Heyhoe Flint (1/3)	113	–	11	0	–	1	England	New Zealand	18 June 1966	North Marine Road, Scarborough	Drawn
18	Enid Bakewell (1/4)	113	–	–	0	–	1	England	Australia	27 December 1968	Adelaide Oval, Adelaide	Drawn
19	Edna Barker	100	–	–	0	–	1	England	Australia	10 January 1969	Junction Oval, Melbourne	Drawn
20	Trish McKelvey (1/2)	155*	–	–	0	–	1	New Zealand	England	15 February 1969	Basin Reserve, Wellington	Drawn
21	Enid Bakewell (2/4)	124	–	–	0	–	2	England	New Zealand	15 February 1969	Basin Reserve, Wellington	Drawn
22	Judi Doull	103	–	–	0	–	1	New Zealand	England	7 March 1969	Hagley Oval, Christchurch	Lost
23	Enid Bakewell (3/4)	114	–	–	0	–	2	England	New Zealand	7 March 1969	Hagley Oval, Christchurch	Won
24	Trish McKelvey (2/2)	117*	–	–	0	–	3	New Zealand	South Africa	25 February 1972	Newlands, Cape Town	Drawn
25	Brenda Williams	100	–	4	0	–	3	South Africa	New Zealand	24 March 1972	Wanderers Stadium, Johannesburg	Drawn
26	Lorraine Hill	118*	–	–	0	–	2	Australia	New Zealand	21 March 1975	Basin Reserve, Wellington	Drawn
27	Rachael Heyhoe Flint (2/3)	110	–	9	0	–	2	England	Australia	19 June 1976	Old Trafford, Manchester	Drawn
28	Margaret Jennings	104	–	9	0	–	2	Australia	England	3 July 1976	Edgbaston, Birmingham	Drawn
29	Jan Lumsden	123	–	12	0	–	2	Australia	England	24 July 1976	The Oval, London	Drawn
30	Rachael Heyhoe Flint (3/3)	179	–	28	0	–	3	England	Australia	24 July 1976	The Oval, London	Drawn
31	Shanta Rangaswamy	108	–	–	0	–	2	India	New Zealand	8 January 1977	Carisbrook, Dunedin	Drawn
32	Barb Bevege	100*	–	–	0	–	3	New Zealand	India	8 January 1977	Carisbrook, Dunedin	Drawn
33	Julie Stockton	117	–	11	0	–	2	Australia	New Zealand	12 January 1979	University Oval, Sydney	Drawn
34	Enid Bakewell (4/4)	112*	–	15	0	–	3	England	West Indies	1 July 1979	Edgbaston, Birmingham	Won
35	Peta Verco	105	–	6	0	–	2	Australia	India	3 February 1984	Sardar Vallabhbhai Patel Stadium, Ahmedabad	Drawn
36	Jill Kennare (1/3)	131	–	17	1	–	2	Australia	India	3 February 1984	Sardar Vallabhbhai Patel Stadium, Ahmedabad	Drawn
37	Karen Price	104*	–	12	0	–	2	Australia	India	3 February 1984	Sardar Vallabhbhai Patel Stadium, Ahmedabad	Drawn
38	Sandhya Agarwal (1/4)	134	–	16	0	–	1	India	Australia	10 February 1984	Wankhede Stadium, Bombay	Drawn
39	Janette Brittin (1/5)	144*	304	12	0	47.36	2	England	New Zealand	6 July 1984	Headingley Cricket Ground, Leeds	Drawn
40	Debbie Hockley (1/4)	107*	241	11	0	44.39	2	New Zealand	England	27 July 1984	St Lawrence Ground, Canterbury	Drawn
41	Carole Hodges (1/2)	158*	323	21	0	48.91	3	England	New Zealand	27 July 1984	St Lawrence Ground, Canterbury	Drawn
42	Janette Brittin (2/5)	112	162	10	0	69.13	3	England	Australia	13 December 1984	WACA, Perth	Drawn
43	Jill Kennare (2/3)	103	165	11	0	62.42	4	Australia	England	13 December 1984	WACA, Perth	Drawn
44	Denise Emerson	121	329	7	0	36.77	2	Australia	England	21 December 1984	Adelaide Oval, Adelaide	Lost
45	Jill Kennare (3/3)	104	204	9	0	50.98	2	Australia	England	25 January 1985	Queen Elizabeth Oval, Bendigo	Won
46	Sandhya Agarwal (2/4)	106	–	10	0	–	2	India	New Zealand	7 March 1985	Barabati Stadium, Cuttack	Drawn
47	Shubhangi Kulkarni	118	285	17	0	41.40	1	India	England	26 June 1986	Collingham Cricket Club, Collingham	Drawn
48	Lesley Cooke	117	186	13	0	62.90	4	England	India	26 June 1986	Collingham Cricket Club, Collingham	Drawn
49	Sandhya Agarwal (3/4)	132	328	9	0	40.24	1	India	England	3 July 1986	Stanley Park, Blackpool	Drawn
50	Jane Powell	115*	257	8	0	44.74	2	England	India	3 July 1986	Stanley Park, Blackpool	Drawn
51	Janette Brittin (3/5)	125	211	13	0	59.24	1	England	India	12 July 1986	New Road, Worcester	Drawn
52	Carole Hodges (2/2)	121*	282	9	0	42.90	1	England	India	12 July 1986	New Road, Worcester	Drawn
53	Sandhya Agarwal † (4/4)	190	523	19	0	36.32	2	India	England	12 July 1986	New Road, Worcester	Drawn
54	Sarah Potter	102	293	12	0	34.81	3	England	India	12 July 1986	New Road, Worcester	Drawn
55	Belinda Haggett (1/2)	126	254	18	0	49.60	2	Australia	England	1 August 1987	New Road, Worcester	Won
56	Lindsay Reeler	110*	406	11	0	27.09	2	Australia	England	21 August 1987	Collingham Cricket Club, Collingham	Drawn
57	Denise Annetts † (1/2)	193	365	30	0	52.87	2	Australia	England	21 August 1987	Collingham Cricket Club, Collingham	Drawn
58	Sally Griffiths	133	279	12	0	47.67	1	Australia	New Zealand	18 January 1990	Cornwall Park, Auckland	Drawn
59	Debbie Hockley (2/4)	126*	407	15	0	30.95	2	New Zealand	Australia	18 January 1990	Cornwall Park, Auckland	Drawn
60	Belinda Clark (1/2)	104	170	11	0	61.17	1	Australia	India	26 January 1991	North Sydney Oval, Sydney	Drawn
61	Belinda Haggett (2/2)	144	355	4	0	40.56	2	Australia	India	9 February 1991	Richmond Cricket Ground, Melbourne	Won
62	Denise Annetts (2/2)	148*	375	7	0	39.46	2	Australia	England	19 February 1992	North Sydney Oval, Sydney	Won
63	Debbie Hockley (3/4)	107	382	11	0	28.01	2	New Zealand	India	7 February 1995	Trafalgar Park, Nelson	Drawn
64	Emily Drumm (1/2)	161*	270	21	0	59.62	1	New Zealand	Australia	28 February 1995	Hagley Oval, Christchurch	Drawn
65	Anju Jain	110	278	10	0	39.56	2	India	England	17 November 1995	CCFG, Calcutta	Drawn
66	Barbara Daniels	160	268	19	0	59.70	1	England	New Zealand	24 June 1996	North Marine Road, Scarborough	Drawn
67	Kathryn Leng	144	229	15	0	62.88	1	England	New Zealand	24 June 1996	North Marine Road, Scarborough	Drawn
68	Kirsty Flavell †	204	504	24	0	40.47	2	New Zealand	England	24 June 1996	North Marine Road, Scarborough	Drawn
69	Debbie Hockley (4/4)	115	259	16	0	44.40	2	New Zealand	England	4 July 1996	New Road, Worcester	Drawn
70	Emily Drumm (2/2)	112*	186	11	0	60.21	3	New Zealand	England	12 July 1996	Woodbridge Road, Guildford	Drawn
71	Chamani Seneviratna	105*	108	12	0	97.22	3	Sri Lanka	Pakistan	17 April 1998	Colts Cricket Club Ground, Colombo	Won
72	Janette Brittin (4/5)	146	490	15	0	29.79	1	England	Australia	6 August 1998	Woodbridge Road, Guildford	Drawn
73	Joanne Broadbent	200	476	25	0	42.01	2	Australia	England	6 August 1998	Woodbridge Road, Guildford	Drawn
74	Mel Jones	131	240	21	0	54.58	2	Australia	England	6 August 1998	Woodbridge Road, Guildford	Drawn
75	Janette Brittin (5/5)	167	402	17	0	41.54	2	England	Australia	11 August 1998	St George's Road, Harrogate	Drawn
76	Belinda Clark (2/2)	136	227	12	0	59.91	2	Australia	England	21 August 1998	New Road, Worcester	Drawn
77	Karen Rolton (1/2)	176*	236	21	0	74.57	2	Australia	England	21 August 1998	New Road, Worcester	Drawn
78	Charlotte Edwards (1/4)	108	249	6	0	43.37	1	England	India	15 July 1999	Denis Compton Oval, Shenley	Drawn
79	Michelle Goszko	204	345	24	0	59.13	2	Australia	England	24 June 2001	Denis Compton Oval, Shenley	Won
80	Karen Rolton † (2/2)	209*	313	29	1	66.77	2	Australia	England	6 July 2001	Headingley Cricket Ground, Leeds	Won
81	Claire Taylor (1/4)	137	232	21	0	59.05	3	England	Australia	6 July 2001	Headingley Cricket Ground, Leeds	Lost
82	Hemlata Kala (1/2)	110	236	15	1	46.61	2	India	England	14 January 2002	K. D. Singh Babu Stadium, Lucknow	Drawn
83	Mithali Raj †	214	407	19	0	52.57	2	India	England	14 August 2002	County Ground, Taunton	Drawn
84	Lisa Sthalekar	120*	329	4	0	36.47	3	Australia	England	22 February 2003	Bankstown Oval, Sydney	Drawn
85	Claire Taylor (2/4)	177	287	22	0	61.67	2	England	South Africa	7 August 2003	Denis Compton Oval, Shenley	Drawn
86	Claire Taylor (3/4)	131	179	23	0	73.18	2	England	South Africa	20 August 2003	County Ground, Taunton	Won
87	Hemlata Kala (2/2)	110	280	7	0	39.28	2	India	New Zealand	27 November 2003	Bilakhiya Stadium, Vapi	Drawn
88	Kiran Baluch †	242	488	38	0	49.59	1	Pakistan	West Indies	15 March 2004	National Stadium, Karachi	Drawn
89	Nadine George	118	185	15	0	63.78	3	West Indies	Pakistan	15 March 2004	National Stadium, Karachi	Drawn
90	Charlotte Edwards (2/4)	117	251	12	0	46.61	2	England	New Zealand	21 August 2004	North Marine Road, Scarborough	Drawn
91	Laura Newton	103	150	14	1	68.66	2	England	New Zealand	21 August 2004	North Marine Road, Scarborough	Drawn
92	Arran Brindle	101*	249	16	0	40.56	4	England	Australia	9 August 2005	County Ground, Hove	Drawn
93	Claire Taylor (4/4)	115	233	9	0	49.35	3	England	India	8 August 2006	Grace Road, Leicester	Drawn
94	Charlotte Edwards (3/4)	105	223	21	0	47.08	3	England	India	29 August 2006	County Ground, Taunton	Lost
95	Jodie Fields	139	254	21	0	54.72	1	Australia	England	10 July 2009	New Road, Worcester	Drawn
96	Charlotte Edwards (4/4)	114*	310	7	0	36.77	1	England	Australia	22 January 2011	Bankstown Oval, Sydney	Lost
97	Sarah Elliott	104	276	14	0	37.68	1	Australia	England	11 August 2013	Sir Paul Getty's Ground, Wormsley	Drawn
98	Heather Knight (1/2)	157	338	20	0	46.44	2	England	Australia	11 August 2013	Sir Paul Getty's Ground, Wormsley	Drawn
99	Thirush Kamini	192	430	24	1	44.65	1	India	South Africa	16 November 2014	Gangotri Glades Cricket Ground, Mysore	Won
100	Poonam Raut	130	355	18	0	36.61	1	India	South Africa	16 November 2014	Gangotri Glades Cricket Ground, Mysore	Won
101	Mignon du Preez	102	253	15	0	40.31	2	South Africa	India	16 November 2014	Gangotri Glades Cricket Ground, Mysore	Lost
102	Ellyse Perry (1/2)	213*	374	26	1	56.95	1	Australia	England	9 November 2017	North Sydney Oval, Sydney	Drawn
103	Ellyse Perry (2/2)	116	281	16	0	41.28	1	Australia	England	18 July 2019	County Ground, Taunton	Drawn
104	Smriti Mandhana (1/2)	127	216	22	1	58.8	1	India	Australia	30 September 2021	Carrara Oval, Queensland	Drawn
105	Heather Knight (2/2)	168*	294	17	1	57.14	2	England	Australia	27 January 2022	Manuka Oval, Canberra	Drawn
106	Marizanne Kapp	150	213	26	0	70.42	1	South Africa	England	27 June 2022	County Ground, Taunton	Drawn
107	Nat Sciver-Brunt (1/2)	169*	263	21	0	64.25	2	England	South Africa	27 June 2022	County Ground, Taunton	Drawn
108	Alice Davidson-Richards	107	194	17	0	55.15	2	England	South Africa	27 June 2022	County Ground, Taunton	Drawn
109	Annabel Sutherland (1/4)	137*	184	14	1	74.45	1	Australia	England	22 June 2023	Trent Bridge, Nottingham	Won
110	Tammy Beaumont	208	331	27	0	62.83	2	England	Australia	22 June 2023	Trent Bridge, Nottingham	Lost
111	Annabel Sutherland (2/4)	210	256	27	2	82.03	2	Australia	South Africa	15 February 2024	WACA Ground, Perth	Won
112	Shafali Verma	205	197	23	8	104.06	1	India	South Africa	28 June 2024	M. A. Chidambaram Stadium, Chennai	Won
113	Smriti Mandhana (2/2)	149	161	27	1	92.54	1	India	South Africa	28 June 2024	M. A. Chidambaram Stadium, Chennai	Won
114	Laura Wolvaardt	122	314	16	0	38.85	3	South Africa	India	28 June 2024	M. A. Chidambaram Stadium, Chennai	Lost
115	Suné Luus	109	203	18	0	53.69	3	South Africa	India	28 June 2024	M. A. Chidambaram Stadium, Chennai	Lost
116	Maia Bouchier	126	154	22	2	81.81	1	England	South Africa	15 December 2024	Mangaung Oval, Bloemfontein	Won
117	Nat Sciver-Brunt (2/2)	128	145	18	0	88.27	1	England	South Africa	15 December 2024	Mangaung Oval, Bloemfontein	Won
118	Annabel Sutherland (3/4)	163	258	21	1	63.17	2	Australia	England	30 January 2025	Melbourne Cricket Ground, Melbourne	Won
119	Beth Mooney	106	173	7	0	61.27	2	Australia	England	30 January 2025	Melbourne Cricket Ground, Melbourne	Won
120	Annabel Sutherland (4/4)	129	171	17	0	75.43	2	Australia	India	6 March 2026	WACA Ground, Perth	Won
121	Yastika Bhatia	113	158	14	0	71.51	3	India	England	10 July 2026	Lord's, London	Won

== Team overview ==
Team statistics for century scores
No.	Team	First Test	No. of Tests	No. of players	No. of centurions	No. of centuries	Highest individual score	Highest scorer
1	Australia	1934	80	185	25	38	213*	Ellyse Perry
2	England	1934	102	170	25	47	208	Tammy Beaumont
3	New Zealand	1935	45	125	6	11	204	Kirsty Flavell
4	South Africa	1960	16	66	6	6	150	Marizanne Kapp
5	West Indies	1976	12	29	1	1	118	Nadine George
6	India	1976	43	99	11	16	214	Mithali Raj
7	Sri Lanka	1998	1	11	1	1	105*	Chamani Seneviratne
8	Pakistan	1998	3	20	1	1	242	Kiran Baluch
9	Ireland	2000	1	11	0	0	68*	Caitriona Beggs
10	Netherlands	2007	1	11	0	0	49	Violet Wattenberg

== Bibliography ==
- Heyhoe Flint, Rachael; Rheinberg, Netta (1976). Fair Play: The Story of Women's Cricket. London: Angus and Robertson. ISBN 0-207-95698-7.
