= Joyce Haddelsey =

English cricketer

Personal information
- Full name: Margaret Joyce Haddelsey
- Born: 1 December 1897; Moseley, Warwickshire, England
- Died: 1977 (aged 79–80); Cambridge, Cambridgeshire, England
- Bowling: Slow left-arm orthodox
- Role: Bowler
- Relatives: ME Haddelsey (sister)

International information
- National side: England (1937)
- Test debut (cap 16): 12 June 1937 v Australia
- Last Test: 26 June 1937 v Australia

Career statistics
Competition	WTest	WFC
Matches	2	3
Runs scored	18	50
Batting average	4.50	8.33
100s/50s	0/0	0/0
Top score	8	29
Balls bowled	204	450
Wickets	1	4
Bowling average	84.00	39.25
5 wickets in innings	0	0
10 wickets in match	0	0
Best bowling	1/9	3/56
Catches/stumpings	1/–	1/–
- Source: CricketArchive, 11 March 2021

Margaret Joyce Haddelsey (1 December 1897 – 1977) was an English cricketer who played as a slow left-arm orthodox bowler. She appeared in two Test matches for England in 1937, both against Australia. Her sister, Muriel, also played one match on the tour. She played domestic cricket for various regional and local teams, including Midlands Women.
