= Josephine Batson =

English cricketer

Personal information
- Full name: Josephine Anne Batson
- Born: 23 February 1929; Richmond, Surrey, England
- Died: 7 March 2000 (aged 57); Eastbourne, East Sussex, England
- Batting: Left-handed
- Role: Batter

International information
- National side: England (1958)
- Only Test (cap 50): 8 March 1958 v Australia

Domestic team information
- Years: Team
- 1949–1960: Surrey

Career statistics
Competition	WTest	WFC
Matches	1	17
Runs scored	2	259
Batting average	2.00	17.26
100s/50s	0/0	0/2
Top score	2	81*
Balls bowled	0	96
Wickets	–	0
Bowling average	–	–
5 wickets in innings	–	0
10 wickets in match	–	0
Best bowling	–	–
Catches/stumpings	0/–	6/–
- Source: CricketArchive, 7 March 2021

Josephine Anne Batson (23 February 1929 – 7 March 2000) was an English cricketer who played as a left-handed batter. She appeared in one Test match for England in 1958, against Australia. She played domestic cricket for Surrey, from 1949 till 1960.
