= Joan Westbrook =

English cricketer

Personal information
- Full name: Joan Hilda Westbrook
- Born: 17 February 1923; Hackney, Middlesex, England
- Died: 25 January 2000 (aged 76); Sutton, London, England
- Batting: Right-handed
- Role: Wicket-keeper

International information
- National side: England (1954)
- Test debut (cap 40): 12 June 1954 v New Zealand
- Last Test: 24 July 1954 v New Zealand

Domestic team information
- Years: Team
- 1949–1981: Surrey

Career statistics
Competition	WTest	WFC
Matches	3	16
Runs scored	34	199
Batting average	6.80	9.04
100s/50s	0/0	0/0
Top score	19	31
Catches/stumpings	3/0	17/6
- Source: CricketArchive, 9 March 2021

Joan Hilda Westbrook (17 February 1923 – 25 January 2000) was an English cricketer who played as a wicket-keeper. She appeared in 3 Test matches for England in 1954, all against New Zealand. She played domestic cricket for Surrey.
