= Betty Belton =

English cricketer

Personal information
- Full name: Margaret Betty Belton
- Born: 1 February 1916; Lowdham, Nottinghamshire, England
- Died: 24 January 1989 (aged 72); Coventry, West Midlands, England
- Role: Bowler

International information
- National side: England (1937)
- Test debut (cap 13): 12 June 1937 v Australia
- Last Test: 13 July 1937 v Australia

Domestic team information
- Years: Team
- 1934: Nottinghamshire

Career statistics
| Competition | WTest | WFC |
|---|---|---|
| Matches | 3 | 6 |
| Runs scored | 54 | 125 |
| Batting average | 10.80 | 12.50 |
| 100s/50s | 0/0 | 0/0 |
| Top score | 25 | 38 |
| Balls bowled | 528 | 1,168 |
| Wickets | 6 | 19 |
| Bowling average | 31.00 | 20.10 |
| 5 wickets in innings | 0 | 1 |
| 10 wickets in match | 0 | 0 |
| Best bowling | 3/65 | 7/62 |
| Catches/stumpings | 3/– | 6/– |
- Source: CricketArchive, 11 March 2021

Margaret Betty Belton (1 February 1916 – 24 January 1989) was an English cricketer who played primarily as a bowler. She appeared in three Test matches for England in 1937, all against Australia. She played domestic cricket for Nottinghamshire.
