= List of England women Test cricketers =

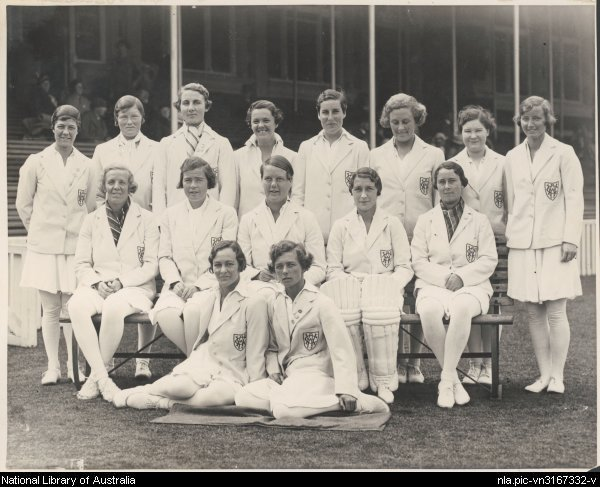
The England women's cricket team that toured Australia and New Zealand in 1934–35.

This is a list of English women Test cricketers. A Test match is an international cricket match between two of the leading cricketing nations.

The list is arranged in the order in which each player won her Test cap. Where more than one player won her first Test cap in the same Test match, those players are listed alphabetically by the surname the player was using at the time of the match.

== Key ==
General

- ‡ – Captain
- † – Wicket-keeper
- First – Year of debut
- Last – Year of latest game
- Mat – Number of matches played
- Win% – Winning percentage

Batting

- Runs – Runs scored in career
- HS – Highest score
- Avg – Runs scored per dismissal
- * – Batsman remained not out

Bowling

- Balls – Balls bowled in career
- Wkt – Wickets taken in career
- BBI – Best bowling in an innings
- Ave – Average runs per wicket

Fielding

- Ca – Catches taken
- St – Stumpings taken

== Players ==
Statistics are correct as of 10 July 2026 after the match against India.

General					Batting			Bowling				Fielding		Ref
Cap	Name	First	Last	Mat	Runs	HS	Avg	Balls	Wkt	BBI	Ave	Ca	St	Ref
1	Betty Archdale ‡	1934	1937	5	133	32*	26.60	0	–	–	–	1	0	
2	Mollie Child	1934	1937	6	151	86*	25.16	0	–	–	–	3	0	
3	Molly Hide ‡	1934	1954	15	872	124*	36.33	2,064	36	5/20	15.25	10	0	
4	Joy Liebert	1934	1935	4	14	13	4.66	0	–	–	–	2	0	
5	Myrtle Maclagan ‡	1934	1951	14	1,007	119	41.95	3,432	60	7/10	15.58	12	0	
6	Joy Partridge	1934	1935	4	33	26*	8.25	637	12	6/96	22.91	5	0	
7	Betty Snowball †	1934	1949	10	613	189	40.86	0	–	–	–	13	8	
8	Mary Spear	1934	1935	4	16	9	16.00	702	14	5/15	5.78	3	0	
9	Peta Taylor	1934	1937	7	31	10*	4.42	627	9	3/6	17.88	1	0	
10	Doris Turner	1934	1935	4	17	9	5.66	222	1	1/12	46.00	1	0	
11	Carol Valentine	1934	1934	1	0	0	0.00	30	1	1/9	9.00	0	0	
12	Mary Richards	1935	1935	3	100	48*	33.33	60	0	–	–	2	0	
13	Betty Belton	1937	1937	3	54	25	10.80	528	6	3/65	31.00	3	0	
14	Joan Davis	1937	1937	3	44	19	8.80	258	11	5/31	11.36	3	0	
15	Muriel Haddelsey	1937	1937	1	8	8	8.00	0	–	–	–	2	0	
16	Joyce Haddelsey	1937	1937	2	18	8	4.50	204	1	1/9	84.00	1	0	
17	Muriel Lowe	1937	1937	3	148	57	29.60	168	2	2/40	52.00	2	0	
18	Eileen Whelan	1937	1949	7	38	10	4.75	594	10	3/35	23.00	3	0	
19	Mona Greenwood	1937	1937	2	36	23	12.00	0	–	–	–	1	0	
20	Audrey Collins	1937	1937	1	28	27	28.00	0	–	–	–	0	0	
21	Mary Duggan ‡	1949	1963	17	652	108	24.14	3,734	77	7/6	13.49	9	0	
22	Mary Johnson	1949	1954	10	113	25*	9.41	1,689	18	4/18	28.55	5	0	
23	Megan Lowe	1949	1949	4	77	25	15.40	384	4	3/34	31.75	0	0	
24	Dorothy McEvoy	1949	1951	5	33	16	8.25	930	13	5/23	19.15	4	0	
25	Netta Rheinberg	1949	1949	1	0	0	0.00	0	–	–	–	0	0	
26	Cecilia Robinson ‡	1949	1963	14	829	105	33.16	0	–	–	–	9	0	
27	Hazel Sanders	1949	1958	12	318	54	15.14	30	0	–	–	15	0	
28	Joan Wilkinson	1949	1958	13	436	90	19.81	360	4	1/9	43.75	7	0	
29	Barbara Wood	1949	1949	1	4	4	4.00	90	1	1/53	53.00	0	0	
30	Grace Morgan †	1949	1951	2	51	37	17.00	0	–	–	–	2	0	
31	Annie Geeves	1951	1951	1	5	5	5.00	72	0	–	–	2	0	
32	Winifred Leech	1951	1951	2	38	15	9.50	258	5	2/10	19.00	0	0	
33	Margaret Lockwood †	1951	1951	2	2	1*	1.00	0	–	–	–	5	0	
34	Barbara Murrey	1951	1954	6	288	62	32.00	0	–	–	–	5	0	
35	Mary Spry	1951	1951	3	71	35	14.20	0	–	–	–	1	0	
36	Betty Birch	1951	1958	8	286	83*	23.83	18	0	–	–	2	0	
37	Jean Cummins	1954	1954	3	90	32	18.00	0	–	–	–	0	0	
38	Kay Green	1954	1954	1	4	4*	–	126	2	2/26	23.00	0	0	
39	Helene Hegarty	1954	1963	7	46	34	9.20	1,581	21	5/48	19.76	1	0	
40	Joan Westbrook †	1954	1954	3	34	19	6.80	0	–	–	–	3	0	
41	Anne Sanders	1954	1969	11	150	40*	13.63	2,123	32	4/29	16.62	12	0	
42	Polly Marshall	1954	1966	13	378	81	22.23	1,056	11	3/14	22.18	2	0	
43	Edna Barker	1957	1969	15	426	100	25.05	1,886	16	4/94	37.50	6	0	
44	Audrey Disbury	1957	1969	10	391	47	24.43	340	2	1/13	65.00	4	0	
45	Dorothy Macfarlane	1957	1963	7	28	17	4.46	1,616	14	4/82	30.57	3	0	
46	Ruth Westbrook †	1957	1963	11	476	87	31.73	0	–	–	–	13	9	
47	Shirley Driscoll	1957	1963	7	235	72	21.36	0	–	–	–	7	0	
48	Joan Hawes	1957	1958	3	5	5	1.66	564	10	4/36	17.80	2	0	
49	Helen Sharpe ‡†	1957	1961	5	296	126	37.00	54	0	–	–	1	1	
50	Josephine Batson	1958	1958	1	2	2	2.00	0	–	–	–	0	0	
51	Rachael Heyhoe Flint ‡	1960	1979	22	1,594	179	45.54	402	3	1/3	68.00	13	0	
52	Mollie Hunt	1960	1961	3	35	29	11.66	228	1	1/31	124.00	0	0	
53	Esme Irwin	1960	1961	4	3	2*	–	1,056	10	4/46	25.00	0	0	
54	Sheila Plant †	1960	1968	8	106	46	10.60	306	5	2/11	14.60	4	1	
55	Alison Ratcliffe	1960	1961	4	226	95	45.20	420	12	4/50	17.58	5	0	
56	Margaret Rutherford	1960	1961	4	7	4	2.33	822	5	2/13	36.40	7	0	
57	Kathleen Smith	1960	1960	1	30	29	15.00	0	–	–	–	0	0	
58	Barbara Pont	1960	1960	2	–	–	–	30	0	–	–	2	0	
59	Ann Jago	1960	1961	2	7	6	7.00	270	1	1/17	59.00	1	0	
60	June Bragger	1963	1966	5	48	12	9.60	312	3	2/21	30.66	3	0	
61	Sandra Brown	1963	1963	3	148	57*	37.00	252	0	–	–	2	0	
62	Jacqueline Elledge	1963	1963	3	147	59	29.40	18	0	–	–	2	0	
63	Mary Pilling	1963	1976	11	43	17*	7.16	1,947	18	4/53	38.33	4	0	
64	Eileen Vigor	1963	1966	5	23	16*	11.50	1,204	13	3/24	20.46	4	0	
65	Lesley Clifford	1966	1969	9	183	42	30.50	1,486	14	5/51	35.07	4	0	
66	June Stephenson	1966	1976	12	345	60*	26.53	1,928	18	4/38	30.72	8	0	
67	Jacqueline Whitney	1966	1966	3	75	40	15.00	42	0	–	–	1	0	
68	Lynne Thomas	1966	1976	10	610	90	40.66	880	7	3/33	44.28	4	0	
69	Rosemary Goodchild	1966	1966	1	1	1	1.00	162	2	2/40	24.00	0	0	
70	Enid Bakewell	1968	1979	12	1,078	124	59.88	2,697	50	7/61	16.62	9	0	
71	Jean Clark	1968	1968	1	7	7	7.00	128	0	–	–	0	0	
72	Carol Evans	1968	1969	3	3	3	3.00	498	10	4/45	15.00	0	0	
73	Chris Watmough	1968	1985	13	397	70	18.04	191	5	1/2	24.00	7	0	
74	Shirley Hodges †	1969	1979	11	98	34*	19.60	0	–	–	–	19	17	
75	Heather Dewdney	1969	1969	1	4	4	2.00	104	2	1/22	28.50	2	0	
76	Jill Cruwys	1969	1976	5	61	40	10.16	0	–	–	–	2	0	
77	Jan Southgate ‡	1976	1985	13	490	74	23.33	238	2	1/13	50.50	9	0	
78	Julia Greenwood	1976	1979	6	16	11	5.33	1,123	29	6/46	16.13	0	0	
79	Glynis Hullah	1976	1979	4	4	3*	4.00	408	3	2/32	66.66	0	0	
80	Megan Lear	1976	1985	9	286	39	19.06	0	–	–	–	12	0	
81	Jacqueline Court	1976	1987	17	577	90	20.60	1,007	8	2/31	61.25	11	0	
82	Jan Brittin	1979	1998	27	1,935	167	49.61	1,188	9	2/15	46.11	12	0	
83	Susan Goatman ‡	1979	1979	3	158	71	31.60	0	–	–	–	3	0	
84	Catherine Mowat	1979	1984	5	0	0	0.00	726	15	4/25	17.53	0	0	
85	Jacqueline Wainwright	1979	1979	2	6	6*	–	132	0	–	–	1	0	
86	Katherine Brown	1979	1979	1	16	16	16.00	138	2	2/35	28.00	0	0	
87	Jill Powell	1979	1979	1	17	17	8.50	0	–	–	–	0	0	
88	Janet Tedstone	1984	1992	12	266	55*	22.16	1,425	12	3/26	40.75	3	0	
89	June Edney †	1984	1985	8	284	51*	28.40	0	–	–	–	11	2	
90	Carole Hodges ‡	1984	1992	18	1,164	158*	40.13	2,556	23	4/21	29.47	25	0	
91	Gillian McConway	1984	1987	14	106	28*	9.63	3,826	40	7/34	25.47	8	0	
92	Susan Metcalfe	1984	1996	13	365	66	24.33	450	3	1/20	71.00	2	0	
93	Avril Starling	1984	1996	11	30	9	6.00	2,738	37	5/36	24.64	4	0	
94	Sarah Potter	1984	1987	7	360	102	32.72	957	8	3/52	48.00	1	0	
95	Jane Powell †	1984	1987	6	281	115*	35.12	0	–	–	–	1	0	
96	Jill Stockdale	1984	1984	1	–	–	–	72	0	–	–	1	0	
97	Helen Stother	1984	1986	7	70	20	5.38	1,185	15	3/58	30.66	1	0	
98	Lesley Cooke	1986	1986	3	290	117	48.33	0	–	–	–	0	0	
99	Julie May	1986	1986	3	7	4*	3.50	402	1	1/75	143.00	2	0	
100	Gillian Smith	1986	1987	4	4	4	1.33	706	6	2/30	54.50	2	0	
101	Amanda Stinson †	1986	1987	4	18	7	6.00	0	–	–	–	8	3	
102	Joan Lee †	1986	1986	1	–	–	–	0	–	–	–	0	0	
103	Jo Chamberlain	1987	1995	9	197	59	17.90	1,840	28	5/26	24.75	0	0	
104	Karen Jobling	1987	1987	1	6	5	3.00	66	0	–	–	1	0	
105	Wendy Watson	1987	1992	7	289	70	28.90	78	1	1/26	42.00	1	0	
106	Elaine Wulcko	1987	1987	2	18	12	6.00	170	1	1/32	94.00	0	0	
107	Karen Smithies ‡	1987	1999	15	445	64	22.15	2,196	16	3/63	45.56	11	0	
108	Suzie Kitson	1992	1992	4	43	35	14.33	546	6	2/16	26.66	2	0	
109	Debra Maybury	1992	1995	5	52	17	7.42	484	5	3/37	32.40	4	0	
110	Lisa Nye †	1992	1992	4	33	16	16.50	0	–	–	–	10	3	
111	Helen Plimmer ‡	1992	1996	9	243	46	18.69	0	–	–	–	9	0	
112	Debra Stock	1992	1996	7	91	22	10.11	1,150	15	4/32	28.66	1	0	
113	Janet Godman	1992	1996	2	14	12	4.66	0	–	–	–	0	0	
114	Jane Smit †	1992	2006	21	554	69	24.08	0	–	–	–	39	4	
115	Barbara Daniels	1995	1998	9	441	160	31.50	98	3	1/9	26.33	4	0	
116	Kathryn Leng	1995	2003	12	436	144	24.22	1,429	17	3/49	39.76	2	0	
117	Melissa Reynard	1995	1999	6	82	60*	13.66	654	5	2/39	65.60	4	0	
118	Clare Taylor	1995	2003	16	226	43	16.14	2,383	25	4/38	40.44	5	0	
119	Sue Redfern	1995	1999	6	146	30	29.20	858	6	2/27	64.50	5	0	
120	Clare Connor ‡	1995	2005	16	502	61	20.08	2,061	24	5/65	27.91	7	0	
121	Sarah-Jane Cook	1996	1996	1	2	2	2.00	168	0	–	–	0	0	
122	Ruth Lupton	1996	1996	1	0	0	0.00	0	–	–	–	1	0	
123	Charlotte Edwards ‡	1996	2015	23	1,676	117	44.10	1,118	12	2/28	48.08	10	0	
124	Lucy Pearson	1996	2004	12	33	18*	4.12	2,194	30	7/51	29.36	3	0	
125	Sarah Collyer	1998	2003	7	155	37	17.22	1,276	8	2/17	50.62	4	0	
126	Laura Newton	1999	2006	13	448	103	21.33	925	12	3/10	33.91	13	0	
127	Claire Taylor †	1999	2009	15	1,030	177	41.20	0	–	–	–	18	0	
128	Caroline Atkins	2001	2011	9	357	90	21.00	90	1	1/9	44.00	5	0	
129	Laura Harper	2001	2005	6	182	31	22.75	1,026	11	5/66	35.63	3	0	
130	Dawn Holden	2001	2002	3	51	24	12.75	330	3	2/62	46.66	1	0	
131	Kate Lowe	2001	2002	3	60	23	12.00	0	–	–	–	0	0	
132	Nicky Shaw	2001	2009	5	48	27	6.85	795	11	3/67	32.45	1	0	
133	Arran Brindle	2001	2014	11	551	101*	30.61	78	0	–	–	5	0	
134	Jackie Hawker	2002	2002	1	13	13	13.00	24	0	–	–	0	0	
135	Helen Wardlaw	2002	2003	3	56	36	18.66	741	8	3/35	33.12	2	0	
136	Mandie Godliman †	2002	2002	1	66	65	66.00	0	–	–	–	2	0	
137	Isa Guha	2002	2011	8	113	31*	16.14	1,491	29	5/40	18.93	3	0	
138	Lydia Greenway	2003	2015	14	362	70	15.73	0	–	–	–	15	0	
139	Rosalie Birch	2003	2008	7	158	62	17.55	860	13	3/57	30.15	4	0	
140	Laura Spragg	2003	2003	1	2	2	2.00	114	0	–	–	0	0	
141	Katherine Sciver-Brunt	2004	2022	14	184	52	13.14	2,611	51	6/69	21.52	5	0	
142	Jenny Gunn	2004	2014	11	391	62*	23.00	2,189	29	5/19	22.24	6	0	
143	Holly Colvin	2005	2011	5	59	21	14.75	727	13	3/42	29.38	1	0	
144	Beth Morgan	2005	2009	7	244	58	24.40	1,025	6	1/17	62.33	1	0	
145	Laura Marsh	2006	2019	9	151	55	12.58	2,045	24	3/44	33.79	4	0	
146	Sarah Taylor †	2006	2019	10	300	40	18.75	0	–	–	–	18	2	
147	Lauren Griffiths †	2011	2011	1	3	3	3.00	0	–	–	–	2	0	
148	Danielle Hazell	2011	2014	3	28	15	7.00	390	2	2/32	102.00	1	0	
149	Heather Knight ‡	2011	2026	15	970	168*	42.17	419	7	2/7	24.42	12	0	
150	Tammy Beaumont	2013	2026	12	612	208	34.00	0	–	–	–	13	0	
151	Anya Shrubsole	2013	2022	8	118	47	9.83	1556	19	4/51	33.42	4	0	
152	Kate Cross	2014	2023	8	58	16	6.44	1464	25	4/63	30.72	2	0	
153	Nat Sciver-Brunt ‡	2014	2026	13	883	169*	46.47	1,057	12	3/41	38.41	10	0	
154	Sonia Odedra	2014	2014	1	2	1	1.00	162	1	1/25	50.00	0	0	
155	Lauren Winfield-Hill	2014	2022	5	166	35	18.44	0	–	–	–	1	0	
156	Georgia Elwiss	2015	2021	4	145	46	29.00	174	1	1/40	91.00	1	0	
157	Sophie Ecclestone	2017	2026	9	196	35	17.81	2,509	40	5/63	29.75	7	0	
158	Fran Wilson	2017	2017	1	13	13	13.00	0	–	–	–	0	0	
159	Kirstie Gordon	2019	2019	1	–	–	–	220	3	2/50	39.66	0	0	
160	Amy Jones †	2019	2026	8	188	64	14.46	0	–	–	–	20	0	
161	Sophia Dunkley	2021	2025	6	228	74*	25.33	18	0	–	–	1	0	
162	Charlie Dean	2022	2024	3	32	20*	10.66	408	7	4/68	35.57	0	0	
163	Lauren Bell	2022	2026	6	19	8	9.50	750	18	4/27	24.11	2	0	
164	Alice Davidson-Richards	2022	2022	1	107	107	107.00	84	1	1/39	43.00	0	0	
165	Emma Lamb	2022	2023	2	76	38	25.33	12	0	–	–	2	0	
166	Issy Wong	2022	2026	2	–	–	–	163	3	2/46	33.00	1	0	
167	Lauren Filer	2023	2026	5	41	14	5.85	588	9	2/49	44.00	1	0	
168	Danni Wyatt-Hodge	2023	2025	4	188	54	23.50	0	–	–	–	1	0	
169	Maia Bouchier	2024	2026	3	129	126	32.25	0	–	–	–	0	0	
170	Ryana MacDonald-Gay	2024	2025	2	22	15*	7.33	210	3	2/50	43.66	0	0	
171	Alice Capsey	2026	2026	1										
172	Mady Villiers	2026	2026	1										
