= Sandra Dawson (cricketer) =

Irish cricketer

Personal information
- Full name: Sandra Wendy Dawson
- Born: 30 October 1962 (age 64); Dublin, Ireland
- Batting: Right-handed
- Role: Wicket-keeper

International information
- National side: Ireland (1993–2000)
- ODI debut (cap 25): 20 July 1993 v New Zealand
- Last ODI: 16 December 2000 v South Africa

Domestic team information
- Years: Team
- 1994–1996: Middlesex
- 1998: Surrey

Career statistics
Competition	WODI	WLA
Matches	24	39
Runs scored	52	210
Batting average	7.42	14.00
100s/50s	0/0	0/1
Top score	13*	54*
Catches/stumpings	10/5	15/9
- Source: CricketArchive, 12 April 2021

Sandra Wendy Dawson (born 30 October 1962) is a former Irish international cricketer who played for the Irish national team between 1993 and 2000. She played in 24 One Day International (ODI) matches, including games at the 1993, 1997 and 2000 World Cups.

Dawson was born in Dublin. She made her ODI debut for Ireland at the 1993 World Cup in England, against New Zealand. A wicket-keeper who generally batted in the lower order, Dawson was Ireland's primary wicket-keeper throughout the remainder of the 1990s. She had little success as a batsman, with her highest ODI score being only 13 not out. That innings came in what was to be her final ODI, played against South Africa at the 2000 World Cup in New Zealand, and included an unbroken ten-wicket partnership of 37 runs with Barbara McDonald, which set a new Irish record. Dawson's ODI career batting average was just 7.42. While not playing internationally, she played several seasons of English county cricket, representing Middlesex and Surrey.
