= Jacqueline Whitney =

English cricketer (born 1943)

Jackie Whitney
Personal information
- Full name: Jacqueline Florence Olive Whitney
- Born: 5 February 1943 (age 83); Surrey, England
- Batting: Right-handed
- Bowling: Right-arm medium
- Role: Batter

International information
- National side: England (1966)
- Test debut (cap 67): 18 Jun 1966 v New Zealand
- Last Test: 6 August 1966 v New Zealand

Domestic team information
- Years: Team
- 1965–1979: Surrey

Career statistics
Competition	WTest	WFC
Matches	3	4
Runs scored	75	167
Batting average	15.00	23.85
100s/50s	0/0	0/1
Top score	40	86
Balls bowled	42	42
Wickets	0	0
Bowling average	–	–
5 wickets in innings	0	0
10 wickets in match	0	0
Best bowling	–	–
Catches/stumpings	1/–	2/–
- Source: CricketArchive, 5 March 2021

Jacqueline Florence Olive "Jackie" Whitney (married name Williams; born 5 February 1943) is an English former cricketer who played as a right-handed batter. She appeared in three Test matches for England in 1966, in a test series against New Zealand. She played domestic cricket for Surrey.
