= Muriel Lowe =

English cricketer (1906–1966)

Personal information
- Full name: Muriel Annie Lowe
- Born: 17 June 1906; Long Eaton, Derbyshire, England
- Died: 25 June 1966 (aged 60); Winchester, Hampshire, England
- Batting: Right-handed
- Bowling: Right-arm medium
- Role: All-rounder

International information
- National side: England (1937)
- Test debut (cap 17): 12 June 1937 v Australia
- Last Test: 10 July 1937 v Australia

Career statistics
Competition	WTest	WFC
Matches	3	7
Runs scored	148	237
Batting average	29.60	21.54
100s/50s	0/1	0/2
Top score	57	57
Balls bowled	168	336
Wickets	2	4
Bowling average	52.00	53.00
5 wickets in innings	0	0
10 wickets in match	0	0
Best bowling	2/40	2/40
Catches/stumpings	2/–	2/–
- Source: CricketArchive, 11 March 2021

Muriel Annie Lowe (17 June 1906 – 25 June 1966) was an English cricketer who played as a right-handed batter and right-arm medium bowler. She appeared in three Test matches for England in 1937, all against Australia. She played domestic cricket for various composite XIs, including South of England.

She later founded a travel agency in Winchester, where she died in 1966.
