= Muriel Haddelsey =

English cricketer

Personal information
- Full name: Muriel Ethel Haddelsey
- Born: 7 August 1894; Moseley, Warwickshire, England
- Died: 1983 (aged 88–89); Malvern, Worcestershire, England
- Role: Batter
- Relatives: MJ Haddelsey (sister)

International information
- National side: England (1937)
- Only Test (cap 15): 12 June 1937 v Australia

Domestic team information
- Years: Team
- 1937: Warwickshire

Career statistics
Competition	WTest	WFC
Matches	1	2
Runs scored	8	44
Batting average	4.00	11.00
100s/50s	0/0	0/0
Top score	8	35
Catches/stumpings	2/–	2/–
- Source: CricketArchive, 11 March 2021

Muriel Ethel Haddelsey (7 August 1894 – 1983) was an English cricketer who played as a batter. She appeared in one Test match for England in 1937, against Australia. Her sister, Joyce, also played two Tests in the series. She played domestic cricket for various composite XIs, as well as Midlands and Warwickshire.
