= Middlesex Women cricket team =

English county cricket team

Middlesex Women

Personnel
- Captain: Saskia Horley
- Coach: Marc Broom

Team information
- Founded: 1935
- Home ground: Various including Mill Hill School Ground

History
- WCC wins: 0
- T20 Cup wins: 1
- T20 Blast League Two wins: 1 (2025)
- Official website: Middlesex Cricket

The Middlesex Women's cricket team is the women's representative cricket team for the English historic county of Middlesex. They are a tier two county side and play their home games at various grounds, including Lord's, Merchant Taylors' School and Radlett Cricket Club. They are captained by Saskia Horley. They won Division 2 of the Women's County Championship in 2019 and won the Women's Twenty20 Cup in 2018. Prior to the 2025 restructure of women's county cricket they were partnered with the regional side Sunrisers.

== History ==
=== 1935–1996: Early History ===
Middlesex Women played their first recorded match in 1935, against Civil Service Women, and went on to play various one-off games over the following years, most often against surrounding teams such as Surrey Women. They joined the Women's Area Championship in 1980, winning the first two titles, and winning again in 1985.

=== 1997– : Women's County Championship ===
After the Area Championship ended in 1996, Middlesex Women were one of the founding teams for the Women's County Championship, beginning in 1997, finishing 5th in Division Two in their first season. After being relegated to Division Three the following season, Middlesex then began a steady rise up through the divisions, finally reaching Division One for the first time in 2011. From here, they remained a mid-table side over subsequent seasons, until they were relegated in 2018, the same year in which they won their first major title, the Twenty20 Cup (after being runners-up in 2014 and 2017). In 2019, the final year of the County Championship, Middlesex won Division 2. Since 2015, Middlesex have also competed in the London Cup, in which they play a Twenty20 match against Surrey. Middlesex won the first five competitions, but Surrey have won three of the four matches played since 2020. The side has also competed in the Women's London Championship since 2020. In 2021, they competed in the South East Group of the Twenty20 Cup, finishing 5th with 3 wins, and regained the London Cup, beating Surrey by 8 wickets. They won their group of the Twenty20 Cup in 2022, going unbeaten. In the 2023 Women's Twenty20 Cup, Middlesex finished top of their group and reached the group final, but the title was shared due to rain. In 2024, the side finished 3rd in their group in the Twenty20 Cup and 5th in their group in the new ECB Women's County One-Day tournament. They also won the Women's London Championship for the first time, winning all of their matches.

== Players ==
=== Current squad ===
Based on appearances in the 2023 season. ‡ denotes players with international caps.

Name	Nationality	Birth date	Batting style	Bowling style	Notes
Batters
Cordelia Griffith	England	19 September 1995 (age 31)	Right-handed	Right-arm medium	
Gemma Marriott	England	Unknown	Unknown	Unknown	Dual-registration with Hertfordshire
Natasha Miles ‡	Hong Kong	19 October 1988 (age 38)	Right-handed	Right-arm medium	
Louise Poulter	England	18 March 1998 (age 28)	Unknown	Unknown	
Isabella Routledge	England	2 November 2002 (age 24)	Right-handed	Right-arm off break	
All-rounders
Chloe Abel ‡	Scotland	Unknown	Right-handed	Right-arm medium	
Kate Coppack	England	30 August 1994 (age 32)	Right-handed	Right-arm medium	
Naomi Dattani	England	28 April 1994 (age 32)	Left-handed	Left-arm medium	
Mariko Hill ‡	Hong Kong	20 November 1995 (age 30)	Right-handed	Right-arm medium	
Saskia Horley ‡	Scotland	23 February 2000 (age 26)	Right-handed	Right-arm off break	Club captain
Riva Pindoria	England	Unknown	Right-handed	Right-arm off break	
Lucy Porter	England	Unknown	Unknown	Unknown	
Amuruthaa Surenkumar	England	24 October 2006 (age 20)	Right-handed	Right-arm medium	
Wicket-keepers
Hermione Baxter-Chinery	England	February 2001 (age 25)	Unknown	–	
Amara Carr	England	17 April 1994 (age 32)	Right-handed	–	
Iqraa Hussain	England	21 September 1999 (age 27)	Unknown	–	
Amelie Munday	England	Unknown	Unknown	–	Dual-registration with Devon
Bowlers
Jenny Bloefeld	England	Unknown	Unknown	Unknown	
Anisha Dissanayake	England	Unknown	Unknown	Right-arm leg break	
Bhavika Gajipra	England	Unknown	Right-handed	Right-arm off break	
Gayatri Gole	England	22 July 1998 (age 28)	Right-handed	Right-arm medium	
Katie Green	England	Unknown	Unknown	Unknown	
Abtaha Maqsood ‡	Scotland	11 June 1999 (age 27)	Right-handed	Right-arm leg break	
Sonali Patel	England	23 May 2003 (age 23)	Right-handed	Right-arm medium	
Emily Thorpe	England	27 January 1999 (age 27)	Right-handed	Right-arm leg break	
Lauren Turner	England	28 April 2004 (age 22)	Right handed	Unknown	

=== Notable players ===
Players who have played for Middlesex and played internationally are listed below, in order of first international appearance (given in brackets):

- (England) Doris Turner (1934)
- (England) Joan Davis (1937)
- (England) Eileen Whelan (1937)
- (England) Audrey Collins (1937)
- (England) Mary Duggan (1949)
- (England) Megan Lowe (1949)
- (England) Netta Rheinberg (1949)
- (England) Winifred Leech (1951)
- (England) Mary Spry (1951)
- (England) Betty Birch (1951)
- (England) Anne Sanders (1954)
- (England) Helen Sharpe (1957)
- (England) Esme Irwin (1960)
- (Australia) Liz Amos (1961)
- (Australia) Margaret Jude (1963)
- (New Zealand) Bev Brentnall (1966)
- (England) Jacqueline Court (1973)
- (England) Ros Heggs (1973)
- (England) Glynis Hullah (1976)
- (England) Catherine Mowat (1978)
- (England) Avril Starling (1982)
- (England) Helen Stother (1982)
- (England) Gillian Smith (1986)
- (England) Lisa Nye (1988)
- (England) Debra Stock (1992)
- (Ireland) Sandra Dawson (1993)
- (India) Chanderkanta Kaul (1993)
- (Pakistan) Shaiza Khan (1997)
- (Pakistan) Sharmeen Khan (1997)
- (England) Beth Morgan (1999)
- (England) Laura Joyce (2001)
- (Australia) Kate Blackwell (2005)
- (Netherlands) Isabelle Westbury (2005)
- (Australia) Jodie Fields (2006)
- (Australia) Lauren Ebsary (2008)
- (Australia) Julie Hunter (2010)
- (England) Fran Wilson (2010)
- (New Zealand) Holly Huddleston (2014)
- (Ireland) Catherine Dalton (2015)
- (England) Alex Hartley (2016)
- (Scotland) Abtaha Maqsood (2018)
- (England) Sophia Dunkley (2018)
- (Hong Kong) Mariko Hill (2019)
- (England) Maia Bouchier (2021)
- (Hong Kong) Natasha Miles (2021)
- (England) Lauren Bell (2022)
- (Scotland) Saskia Horley (2022)
- (Scotland) Chloe Abel (2023)

== Seasons ==
=== Women's County Championship ===
Season	Division	League standings								Notes
Season	Division	P	W	L	T	A/C	BP	Pts	Pos	Notes
1997	Division 2	5	1	4	0	0	26	38	5th	
1998	Division 2	5	1	4	0	0	26	38	6th	Relegated
1999	Division 3	5	3	2	0	0	39	75	2nd	
2000	Division 3	5	3	2	0	0	40	76	2nd	
2001	Division 3	4	4	0	0	0	38.5	86.5	1st	Promoted
2002	Division 2	5	0	3	0	2	20	42	5th	
2003	Division 2	5	4	1	0	0	38.5	86.5	2nd	
2004	Division 2	5	2	3	0	0	31.5	55.5	5th	
2005	Division 3	6	2	3	0	1	36.5	71.5	2nd	
2006	Division 3	6	3	2	0	1	6	74	3rd	
2007	Division 3	6	2	2	0	2	7	77	2nd	
2008	Division 3	6	3	3	0	0	10	70	2nd	Promoted
2009	Division 2	10	7	3	0	0	14	154	2nd	
2010	Division 2	10	8	2	0	0	64	144	1st	Promoted
2011	Division 1	10	5	3	0	2	45	95	3rd	
2012	Division 1	8	1	2	0	5	18	28	4th	
2013	Division 1	8	2	6	0	0	45	65	7th	
2014	Division 1	8	2	3	0	3	28	48	6th	
2015	Division 1	8	3	4	0	1	44	74	5th	
2016	Division 1	8	4	3	0	1	36	76	6th	
2017	Division 1	7	3	4	0	0	46	76	5th	
2018	Division 1	7	2	4	0	1	32	52	7th	Relegated
2019	Division 2	7	5	1	1	0	47	102	1st	

=== Women's Twenty20 Cup ===
Season	Division	League standings								Notes
Season	Division	P	W	L	T	A/C	NRR	Pts	Pos	Notes
2009	Division 3	3	1	1	0	1	–0.25	3	3rd	
2010	Division S1	3	1	2	0	0	–1.84	2	3rd	
2011	Division S1	3	1	2	0	0	–1.52	2	3rd	
2012	Division S1	3	0	2	0	1	–1.23	2	3rd	
2013	Division S1	3	2	1	0	0	+0.34	8	3rd	
2014	Division 1A	4	3	1	0	0	+0.31	6	2nd	
2015	Division 1	8	5	3	0	0	+1.34	20	4th	
2016	Division 1	7	3	2	0	2	+0.29	14	3rd	
2017	Division 1	8	5	3	0	0	+0.76	20	2nd	
2018	Division 1	8	7	1	0	0	+0.55	28	1st	Champions
2019	Division 1	8	2	4	0	2	–0.61	10	8th	
2021	South East	8	3	4	0	1	+0.18	13	5th	
2022	South East	6	6	0	0	0	+5.13	24	1st	Group winners
2023	Group 6	6	4	0	0	2	+1.34	18	1st	Shared group winners
2024	Group 3	8	4	2	0	2	+0.13	73	3rd	

=== ECB Women's County One-Day ===
Season	Group	League standings								Notes
Season	Group	P	W	L	T	A/C	BP	Pts	Pos	Notes
2024	Group 4	4	1	3	0	0	1	5	5th	

== Honours ==
- Women's Area Championship:
  - Champions (3) – 1980, 1981 & 1985
- County Championship:
  - Division Two Champions (2) – 2010 & 2019
  - Division Three Champions (1) – 2001
- Twenty20 Cup:
  - Division One Champions (1) – 2018
  - Group winners (1) – 2022; shared (1): 2023

== See also ==
- Middlesex County Cricket Club
- Sunrisers (women's cricket)
