= Mollie Child =

English cricketer

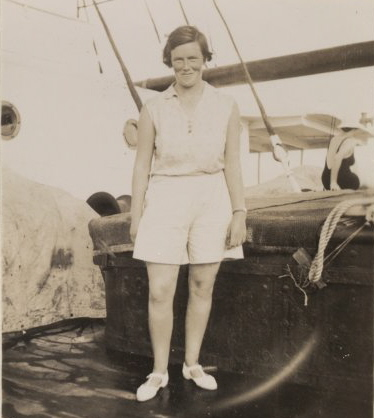

Personal information
- Full name: Elizabeth Mary Child
- Born: 8 August 1908; Harpenden, Hertfordshire, England
- Died: October 1989 (aged 81); Sussex, England
- Nickname: Mollie
- Role: Batter

International information
- National side: England (1934–1937)
- Test debut (cap 2): 28 December 1934 v Australia
- Last Test: 29 June 1937 v Australia

Domestic team information
- Years: Team
- 1937: Surrey

Career statistics
Competition	WTest	WFC
Matches	6	12
Runs scored	151	242
Batting average	25.16	18.61
100s/50s	0/1	0/1
Top score	86*	86*
Catches/stumpings	3/–	3/–
- Source: CricketArchive, 12 March 2021

Elizabeth Mary "Mollie" Child (8 August 1908 – October 1989) was an English cricketer who played as a batter. She appeared in 6 Test matches for England between 1934 and 1937. She played domestic cricket for various regional sides, as well as Surrey.
