= Shirley Driscoll =

English cricketer (born 1935)

Personal information
- Full name: Shirley Driscoll
- Born: 25 October 1935 (age 91); Mortlake, Surrey, England
- Batting: Right-handed
- Role: Batter

International information
- National side: England (1957–1963)
- Test debut (cap 47): 27 December 1957 v New Zealand
- Last Test: 20 July 1963 v Australia

Domestic team information
- Years: Team
- 1955–1964: Surrey

Career statistics
| Competition | WTest | WFC |
|---|---|---|
| Matches | 7 | 26 |
| Runs scored | 235 | 1,135 |
| Batting average | 21.36 | 31.52 |
| 100s/50s | 0/1 | 0/8 |
| Top score | 72 | 98 |
| Catches/stumpings | 7/– | 14/– |
- Source: CricketArchive, 7 March 2021

Shirley Driscoll (born 25 October 1935) is an English former cricketer who played as a right-handed batter. She appeared in seven Test matches for England between 1957 and 1963. She played domestic cricket for Surrey for a decade.
