= Peta Taylor =

English cricketer

Personal information
- Full name: Mary Isabella Taylor
- Born: 11 July 1912; Wimbledon, Surrey, England
- Died: 22 March 1989 (aged 76); Monreith, Wigtownshire, Scotland
- Nickname: Peta
- Bowling: Right-arm medium
- Role: Bowler

International information
- National side: England (1934–1937)
- Test debut (cap 9): 28 December 1934 v Australia
- Last Test: 13 July 1937 v Australia

Career statistics
| Competition | WTest | WFC |
|---|---|---|
| Matches | 7 | 12 |
| Runs scored | 31 | 58 |
| Batting average | 4.42 | 5.27 |
| 100s/50s | 0/0 | 0/0 |
| Top score | 10* | 17* |
| Balls bowled | 627 | 1,148 |
| Wickets | 9 | 14 |
| Bowling average | 17.88 | 22.21 |
| 5 wickets in innings | 0 | 0 |
| 10 wickets in match | 0 | 0 |
| Best bowling | 3/6 | 3/6 |
| Catches/stumpings | 1/– | 1/– |
- Source: CricketArchive, 11 March 2021

Mary Isabella "Peta" Taylor, married name Mary Jager, (11 July 1912 – 22 March 1989) was an English cricketer who played as a right-arm medium bowler. She appeared in seven Test matches for England between 1934 and 1937, including the first ever women's Test match. She played domestic cricket for various composite XIs, as well as South Women.
