= Ruth Lupton =

English cricketer (born 1964)

Personal information
- Full name: Ruth Lupton
- Born: 9 December 1964 (age 61); Claro, Yorkshire, England
- Role: Batter

International information
- National side: England (1995–1996)
- Only Test (cap 122): 24 June 1996 v New Zealand
- ODI debut (cap 70): 19 July 1995 v Denmark
- Last ODI: 20 July 1995 v Ireland

Domestic team information
- Years: Team
- 1985–1991: Lancashire and Cheshire
- 1993–2000: Surrey

Career statistics
Competition	WTest	WODI	WFC	WLA
Matches	1	2	3	73
Runs scored	0	21	30	2,313
Batting average	0.00	21.00	6.00	37.30
100s/50s	0/0	0/0	0/0	3/16
Top score	0	19	15	151*
Balls bowled	–	–	–	318
Wickets	–	–	–	13
Bowling average	–	–	–	13.69
5 wickets in innings	–	–	–	0
10 wickets in match	–	–	–	0
Best bowling	–	–	–	3/12
Catches/stumpings	1/–	0/–	5/–	19/–
- Source: CricketArchive, 13 February 2021

Ruth Lupton (born 9 December 1964) is an English cricketer and former member of the England women's cricket team. She was born in 1964 and played one test, against New Zealand at Scarborough, and two one day internationals, both at the 1995 Women's European Cricket Cup.
