= Una Paisley =

Australian cricketer

Cricket information
- Batting: Right-handed
- Bowling: Right-arm off-break

Career statistics
Competition	Test
Matches	12
Runs scored	471
Batting average	27.70
100s/50s	2/0
Top score	108
Balls bowled	1,365
Wickets	19
Bowling average	22.94
5 wickets in innings	0
10 wickets in match	0
Best bowling	3/10
Catches/stumpings	7/–
- Source: Cricinfo, 2 January 2008

Una Lillian Paisley (18 November 1922 – 1977) was an Australian cricketer. She played twelve Test matches for the Australia national women's cricket team captaining the team in four of those Test matches, against New Zealand and England.

A right-handed batter and off break bowler, she played 12 Test matches in all from 1948 to 1961, scoring 471 runs with a best of 108, one of her two centuries. She also took 19 wickets at a bowling average of 22.94 runs per wicket. Paisley was born at Kew in Melbourne, Victoria in 1922 and died there in 1977

== Test centuries ==
Paisley scored two centuries in Test matches, both against New Zealand.

Una Paisley's Test centuries
No.	Runs scored	Opponents	Venue	Year
1	108	New Zealand	Basin Reserve, Wellington, New Zealand	1948
2	101	New Zealand	King's College Oval, Adelaide, Australia	1957

== See also ==
- List of centuries in women's Test cricket
