= June James (cricketer) =

Australian cricketer

Personal information
- Born: 22 April 1925; South Perth, Western Australia
- Died: 1 October 1997 (aged 72); South Perth, Western Australia
- Batting: Right-handed
- Bowling: Right-arm medium-fast

International information
- National side: Australia
- Only Test (cap 38): 16 June 1951 v England
- Source: CricketArchive, 25 February 2015

June James (married name June Morey, 22 April 1925 – 1 October 1997) was an Australian cricket player.

James played one Test match for the Australia national women's cricket team in 1951. She was Western Australia's first female Test player.
