= Grace Morgan =

English cricketer

Personal information
- Full name: Grace Angela Morgan
- Born: 5 May 1909; Richmond-upon-Thames, Surrey, England
- Died: 20 October 1996 (aged 87); Guildford, Surrey, England
- Role: Wicket-keeper

International information
- National side: England (1949–1951)
- Test debut (cap 30): 26 March 1949 v New Zealand
- Last Test: 28 July 1951 v Australia

Domestic team information
- Years: Team
- 1949–1951: Surrey

Umpiring information
- WTests umpired: 1 (1954)

Career statistics
Competition	WTest	WFC
Matches	2	20
Runs scored	51	490
Batting average	17.00	24.50
100s/50s	0/0	0/2
Top score	37	69
Catches/stumpings	2/0	9/9
- Source: CricketArchive, 10 March 2021

Grace Angela Morgan (5 May 1909 – 20 October 1996) was an English cricketer who played as a wicket-keeper and was also a cricket umpire. She appeared in two Test matches for England between 1949 and 1951. She played domestic cricket for Surrey.

Her two Test matches were against New Zealand at Eden Park, Auckland in 1949, and against Australia at The Oval in 1951. She also umpired one test match, between England and New Zealand at New Road, Worcester in 1954.
