= Richmond Drive =

Cricket ground in Skegness, Lincolnshire, England

Coordinates: 53°08′31.93″N 0°20′10.70″E

Ground information
- Location: Skegness, Lincolnshire
- Establishment: 1879 (first recorded match)

Team information
Lincolnshire	(1907-1914 & 1924-1936)
Minor Counties	(1935)
- As of 18 August 2010; Source: Ground profile

Richmond Drive is a cricket ground in Skegness, Lincolnshire. The first recorded match on the ground was in 1879, when a Lincolnshire team played against Notts Castle. The first Minor Counties Championship match played at the ground saw Lincolnshire play the Yorkshire Second XI in 1907. From between 1907 and 1936, the ground hosted 14 Minor Counties Championship matches, the last of which saw Lincolnshire play Hertfordshire.

The ground also held a single first-class match in 1935, when a combined Minor Counties team played the touring South Africans.
