= Kay Green =

Welsh cricketer (1927–1997)

Personal information
- Full name: Kathleen Mary Green
- Born: 25 September 1927; Swansea, Glamorgan, Wales
- Died: 30 November 1997 (aged 70); Child Okeford, Dorset, England
- Batting: Right-handed
- Bowling: Right-arm leg break
- Role: Bowler

International information
- National side: England (1954–1973)
- Only Test (cap 38): 12 June 1954 v New Zealand
- ODI debut (cap 12): 14 July 1973 v New Zealand
- Last ODI: 18 July 1973 v Young England

Domestic team information
- Years: Team
- 1949: Sussex
- 1950–1974: West

Umpiring information
- WODIs umpired: 1 (1976)

Career statistics
Competition	WTest	WODI	WFC	WLA
Matches	1	2	15	3
Runs scored	4	1	215	2
Batting average	–	–	13.43	2.00
100s/50s	0/0	0/0	0/0	0/0
Top score	4*	1*	40	1*
Balls bowled	126	36	1,162	36
Wickets	2	1	23	1
Bowling average	23.00	21.00	21.56	21.00
5 wickets in innings	0	0	0	0
10 wickets in match	0	–	0	–
Best bowling	2/26	1/21	4/14	1/21
Catches/stumpings	0/–	1/–	14/1	2/–
- Source: CricketArchive, 9 March 2021

Kathleen Mary "Kay" Green (25 September 1927 – 30 November 1997) was a Welsh cricketer who played primarily as a right-arm leg break bowler, as well as an occasional wicket-keeper. She appeared in one Test match in 1954 and two One Day Internationals in 1973 for England. She mainly played domestic cricket for West of England.

Green is the oldest woman cricketer to make debut in Women's ODI history (at the age of 45 years and 292 days).
