= Joan Schmidt =

Australian cricketer

Personal information
- Full name: Lindsay Joan Schmidt
- Born: 24 January 1920; Maroona, Victoria, Australia
- Died: 19 March 2003 (aged 83)
- Batting: Left-handed
- Role: Batter

International information
- National side: Australia
- Test debut (cap 23): 20 March 1948 v New Zealand
- Last Test: 28 July 1951 v England

Career statistics
Competition	WTest
Matches	7
Runs scored	210
Batting average	17.50
100s/50s	0/0
Top score	42
Catches/stumpings	8/-
- Source: CricInfo, 5 February 2015

Lindsay Joan Schmidt (24 January 1920 in Maroona, Victoria - 19 March 2003) was an Australian former cricket player.

Schmidt played seven Test matches for the Australia women's national cricket team.
