= Mary Duggan =

English cricketer (1925–1973)

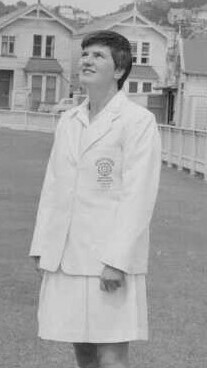
- Posing for a coin toss photo in 1957

Personal information
- Full name: Mary Beatrice Duggan
- Born: 7 November 1925; Worcester, Worcestershire, England
- Died: 10 March 1973 (aged 47); Colwall, Herefordshire, England
- Batting: Right-handed
- Bowling: Left-arm medium-fast Slow left-arm orthodox
- Role: All-rounder
- Relatives: Jonathan Agnew (cousin)

International information
- National side: England (1949–1963)
- Test debut (cap 21): 15 January 1949 v Australia
- Last Test: 20 July 1963 v Australia

Domestic team information
- Years: Team
- 1949: Yorkshire
- 1951–1963: Middlesex

Career statistics
Competition	WTest	WFC
Matches	17	65
Runs scored	652	1,708
Batting average	24.14	21.89
100s/50s	2/1	2/3
Top score	108	108
Balls bowled	3,734	10,616
Wickets	77	246
Bowling average	13.49	12.52
5 wickets in innings	5	15
10 wickets in match	0	3
Best bowling	7/6	8/21
Catches/stumpings	9/–	31/–
- Source: CricketArchive, 10 March 2021

Mary Beatrice Duggan (7 November 1925 – 10 March 1973) was an English cricketer who played as an all-rounder. She appeared in 17 Test matches for England between 1949 and 1963, and captained the side from 1957 onwards. Most of her domestic career was spent with Middlesex.

== Life and career ==
Duggan was the youngest of three children of Mary Heath (née Gattey) and Norman Duggan, a physician and surgeon. She attended the Alice Ottley School, Worcester and Royal High School, Bath, before training as a physical education teacher at Dartford College of Physical Education.

A right-handed batter, Duggan scored 652 runs in Tests at an average of 24.14, and in her last game hit an unbeaten century against Australia at the Oval (the first there by a woman at Test match level). She was also an effective bowler, and bowled both medium pace and left-arm orthodox spin. Her tally of 77 Test wickets, taken at an average of just 13.49, remains an all-time record. In February 1958, she took a remarkable 7 wickets for 6 runs in the first innings of the second Test against Australia, played at the St Kilda Cricket Ground, Melbourne. Until 1995 these were the best figures in women's Test history, and as of 1 January 2024, have been surpassed only twice. In 1957, she took over the England captaincy from Molly Hide. In addition to her hundred in her final match, she took 7 for 72, and was instrumental in England winning the match and the series.

In 1962, Duggan and Ruth Westbrook became the first women to be awarded the MCC's advanced coaching certificate. At the time of her death, she was president of the Women's Cricket Association, and for 10 years had been vice-principal of Dartford College of Education. Amongst the students she taught there was her successor as England captain, Rachael Heyhoe Flint, who picked out Duggan as being one of the institution's "first-class lecturers".

Duggan was a first cousin of England cricketer and cricket commentator Jonathan Agnew.

== Test centuries ==
Runs	Match	Opponents	City	Venue	Year
108	11	New Zealand	Christchurch, New Zealand	Lancaster Park	1957
101*	17	Australia	London, England	The Oval	1963

- Source: CricInfo

== See also ==
- List of centuries in women's Test cricket
