= Surrey Women cricket team =

English cricket team

Surrey Women

Personnel
- Captain: Bryony Smith
- Coach: Johann Myburgh
- Overseas player: TBA

Team information
- Founded: Unknown First recorded match: 1811 Reformed: 2024
- Home ground: Various

History
- WCC wins: 0
- T20 Cup wins: 1
- T20 Blast League One wins: 1 (2025)
- Official website: Surrey Women's Cricket
T20
One Day

The Surrey Women's cricket team is the women's representative cricket team for the English historic county of Surrey, and was a replacement for regional team South East Stars. They play their home games at various grounds across the county, including The Oval, as well as County Cricket Ground, Beckenham and Woodbridge Road, Guildford. They are captained by Bryony Smith and coached by Johann Myburgh. They currently play in the Women's One-Day Cup and the Women's T20 Blast

== History ==
=== 1811–1996: Early History ===
Surrey Women played their first recorded match in 1811, against Hampshire Women. They went on to play various one-off matches, including regular games against Middlesex, as well as against touring sides such as Australia. Surrey joined the Women's Area Championship in 1980, and continued to play in the competition until it was discontinued, in 1996.

=== 1997–2024: Women's County Championship ===
Surrey Women joined the Women's County Championship in 1997, its inaugural season, finishing 3rd in Division One. After finishing 2nd in 1998, they battled relegation in subsequent seasons, before suffering two successive relegations in 2004 and 2005. Surrey bounced back with a rapid climb back up through the Divisions, winning Division 3 in 2006 and Division 2 in 2008. In 2009, they were again relegated from Division 1, but did find success in the first season of the Women's Twenty20 Cup, where they were crowned champions of Division 1. Surrey were unable to find further success in the Twenty20 Cup however, and soon became a regular lower-table Division 1 side in both competitions.

Since 2015, Surrey have also competed in the London Cup, in which they play a Twenty20 match against Middlesex. After losing the first five competitions, Surrey finally triumphed in 2020, winning the match by 4 wickets. The side also won the inaugural Women's London Championship in 2020. In 2021, they played in the South East Group of the Twenty20 Cup, finishing 2nd with 4 wins, as well as losing the London Cup to Middlesex by 8 wickets and finishing second to Kent in the London Championship. They finished bottom of their group in the 2022 Women's Twenty20 Cup, but regained their title in the Women's London Championship. They finished third in their group in the 2023 Women's Twenty20 Cup. In 2024, the side finished 6th in their group in the Twenty20 Cup and 2nd in their group in the new ECB Women's County One-Day tournament.

=== 2024–Present: Reformation of Surrey Women ===
In 2024, with reforms to the structure of domestic cricket in England, the regional side South East Stars was replaced with a professionalised Surrey team.

== Players ==
=== Current squad ===
- No. denotes the player's squad number, as worn on the back of their shirt.
- ‡ denotes players with international caps.

No.	Name	Nationality	Birth date	Batting style	Bowling style	Notes
Batters
22	Danni Wyatt-Hodge ‡	England	22 April 1991 (age 35)	Right-handed	Right-arm off break	England central contract
28	Aylish Cranstone	England	28 August 1994 (age 32)	Left-handed	Left-arm medium	
All-rounders
4	Bryony Smith ‡	England	12 December 1997 (age 28)	Right-handed	Right-arm off break	Club captain
7	Paige Scholfield ‡	England	19 December 1995 (age 30)	Right-handed	Right-arm medium	
10	Phoebe Franklin	England	18 February 1998 (age 28)	Right-handed	Right-arm medium	
11	Priyanaz Chatterji ‡	Scotland	12 August 1993 (age 33)	Right-handed	Right-arm medium	
24	Alice Davidson-Richards ‡	England	29 May 1994 (age 32)	Right-handed	Right-arm medium	
26	Alice Capsey ‡	England	11 August 2004 (age 22)	Right-handed	Right-arm off break	England central contract
27	Kalea Moore	England	27 March 2003 (age 23)	Right-handed	Right-arm off break	
30	Emily Burke	England	30 September 2005 (age 21)	Right-handed	Right-arm medium	
47	Sophia Dunkley ‡	England	16 July 1998 (age 28)	Right-handed	Right-arm leg break	England central contract
66	Alice Monaghan	England	20 March 2000 (age 26)	Right-handed	Right-arm medium	
—	Freya Kemp ‡	England	21 April 2005 (age 21)	Left-handed	Left-arm medium	England central contract
Wicket-keepers
17	Rachel King	England	1 October 2004 (age 22)	Right-handed	—	
20	Kira Chathli	England	29 July 1999 (age 27)	Right-handed	—	Captain (LA)
67	Jemima Spence	England	6 July 2006 (age 20)	Right-handed	—	
Bowlers
18	Izzy Sidhu	England	18 October 2003 (age 22)	Right-handed	Slow left-arm unorthodox	
19	Danielle Gregory	England	4 December 1998 (age 27)	Right-handed	Right-arm leg break	
21	Tilly Corteen-Coleman ‡	England	23 August 2007 (age 19)	Left-handed	Slow left-arm orthodox	
29	Ryana MacDonald-Gay ‡	England	12 February 2004 (age 22)	Right-handed	Right-arm medium	England skills contract
38	Bethan Miles	England	25 November 2003 (age 22)	Right-handed	Slow left-arm orthodox	
56	Kate Coppack	England	30 August 1994 (age 32)	Right-handed	Right-arm medium	
Source: Updated: 1 October 2026

=== Notable players ===
Players who have played for Surrey and played internationally are listed below, in order of first international appearance (given in brackets):

- (England) Mollie Child (1934)
- (England) Molly Hide (1934)
- (England) Myrtle Maclagan (1934)
- (England) Dorothy McEvoy (1949)
- (England) Grace Morgan (1949)
- (England) Hazel Sanders (1949)
- (England) Barbara Murrey (1951)
- (England) Jean Cummins (1954)
- (England) Helene Hegarty (1954)
- (England) Joan Westbrook (1954)
- (England) Edna Barker (1957)
- (England) Shirley Driscoll (1957)
- (England) Joan Hawes (1957)
- (England) Josephine Batson (1958)
- (England) Sheila Plant (1960)
- (England) Sandra Brown (1963)
- (England) Eileen Vigor (1963)
- (England) Jacqueline Whitney (1966)
- (England) Enid Bakewell (1968)
- (England) Chris Watmough (1968)
- (England) Geraldine Davies (1973)
- (England) Jan Southgate (1976)
- (England) Jan Brittin (1979)
- (England) Margaret Peear (1979)
- (England) Gill McConway (1982)
- (England) Patsy Lovell (1987)
- (England) Caroline Barrs (1988)
- (Ireland) Sandra Dawson (1993)
- (England) Ruth Lupton (1995)
- (Australia) Olivia Magno (1996)
- (Australia) Melanie Jones (1997)
- (England) Nicky Shaw (1999)
- (England) Sarah Clarke (2001)
- (England) Laura Joyce (2001)
- (England) Ebony Rainford-Brent (2001)
- (Ireland) Emma Beamish (2003)
- (Australia) Emma Sampson (2007)
- (New Zealand) Rachel Candy (2007)
- (South Africa) Olivia Anderson (2008)
- (Cricket West Indies) (Barbados) Shakera Selman (Note: Selman has represented both the West Indies and Barbados in international cricket.) (2008)
- (South Africa) Marizanne Kapp (2009)
- (England) Susie Rowe (2010)
- (New Zealand) Lea Tahuhu (2011)
- (England) Nat Sciver-Brunt (2013)
- (England) Sophia Dunkley (2016)
- (England) Bryony Smith (2018)
- (Scotland) Priyanaz Chatterji (2018)
- (Hong Kong) Natasha Miles (2021)
- (England) Alice Capsey (2022)
- (England) Danni Wyatt-Hodge (2025)

== Seasons ==
=== Women's County Championship ===
Season	Division	League standings								Notes
Season	Division	P	W	L	T	A/C	BP	Pts	Pos	Notes
1997	Division 1	5	3	2	0	0	31	67	3rd	
1998	Division 1	5	4	1	0	0	34.5	82.5	2nd	
1999	Division 1	5	2	3	0	0	32.5	56.5	4th	
2000	Division 1	5	1	4	0	0	31.5	43.5	5th	
2001	Division 1	5	1	4	0	0	27	39	5th	
2002	Division 1	5	1	2	0	2	15	49	5th	
2003	Division 1	5	2	3	0	0	30.5	54.5	5th	
2004	Division 1	5	0	5	0	0	26	26	6th	Relegated
2005	Division 2	6	0	5	0	1	22	33	4th	Relegated
2006	Division 3	6	3	1	0	2	11	79	1st	Promoted
2007	Division 2	6	3	2	0	1	6	91	2nd	
2008	Division 2	6	5	1	0	0	6	106	1st	Promoted
2009	Division 1	10	1	9	0	0	31	51	6th	Relegated
2010	Division 2	10	5	4	0	1	46	96	4th	
2011	Division 2	10	6	3	0	1	59	119	2nd	Promoted
2012	Division 1	8	1	2	0	5	12	22	7th	
2013	Division 1	8	1	6	0	1	37	47	9th	
2014	Division 1	8	5	2	0	1	46	96	2nd	
2015	Division 1	8	3	5	0	0	53	83	6th	
2016	Division 1	8	1	7	0	0	43	53	8th	Relegated
2017	Division 2	7	4	3	0	0	47	87	4th	
2018	Division 2	7	6	1	0	0	49	109	2nd	Promoted
2019	Division 1	7	2	5	0	0	39	59	7th	

=== Women's Twenty20 Cup ===
Season	Division	League standings								Notes
Season	Division	P	W	L	T	A/C	NRR	Pts	Pos	Notes
2009	Division 1	3	2	0	0	1	−0.36	5	1st	Champions
2010	Division S1	3	0	3	0	0	−2.62	0	4th	Relegated
2011	Division S2	3	3	0	0	0	+2.44	6	1st	Promoted
2012	Division S1	3	0	2	0	1	−5.53	1	4th	Relegated
2013	Division S2	3	3	0	0	0	+2.05	6	1st	
2014	Division 1B	4	3	1	0	0	+0.78	12	6th	
2015	Division 1	8	0	6	0	2	−2.12	2	9th	Relegated
2016	Division 2	7	4	1	0	2	+0.71	18	2nd	Promoted
2017	Division 1	8	4	4	0	0	−0.36	16	5th	
2018	Division 1	8	3	5	0	0	−0.77	12	7th	
2019	Division 1	8	4	3	0	1	+0.95	17	5th	
2021	South East	8	4	3	0	1	–0.16	17	2nd	
2022	Group 6	6	1	5	0	0	–1.35	4	4th	
2023	Group 6	6	2	2	0	2	+0.11	10	3rd	
2024	Group 3	8	5	1	0	2	+1.24	59	6th	

=== ECB Women's County One-Day ===
Season	Group	League standings								Notes
Season	Group	P	W	L	T	A/C	BP	Pts	Pos	Notes
2024	Group 4	4	2	1	0	1	2	11	2nd	

== Honours ==
- County Championship:
  - Division Two champions (1) – 2008
  - Division Three champions (1) – 2006
- Women's Twenty20 Cup:
  - Champions (1) – 2009

== See also ==
- Surrey County Cricket Club
- South East Stars
