= Winifred Leech =

English cricketer

Personal information
- Full name: Winifred Constance Leech
- Born: 5 August 1920; Tooting, Surrey, England
- Died: 10 May 2000 (aged 79); Tooting, London, England
- Batting: Right-handed
- Role: All-rounder

International information
- National side: England (1951)
- Test debut (cap 32): 16 June 1951 v Australia
- Last Test: 30 June 1951 v Australia

Domestic team information
- Years: Team
- 1949–1955: Middlesex

Career statistics
Competition	WTest	WFC
Matches	2	6
Runs scored	38	195
Batting average	9.50	19.50
100s/50s	0/0	0/1
Top score	15	67
Balls bowled	258	366
Wickets	5	6
Bowling average	19.00	25.33
5 wickets in innings	0	0
10 wickets in match	0	0
Best bowling	2/10	2/10
Catches/stumpings	0/–	0/–
- Source: CricketArchive, 9 March 2021

Winifred Constance Leech (5 August 1920 – 10 May 2000) was an English cricketer who played as an all-rounder. She appeared in two Test matches for England in 1951, both against Australia. She played domestic cricket for Middlesex.
