= Mollie Dive =

Australian cricketer

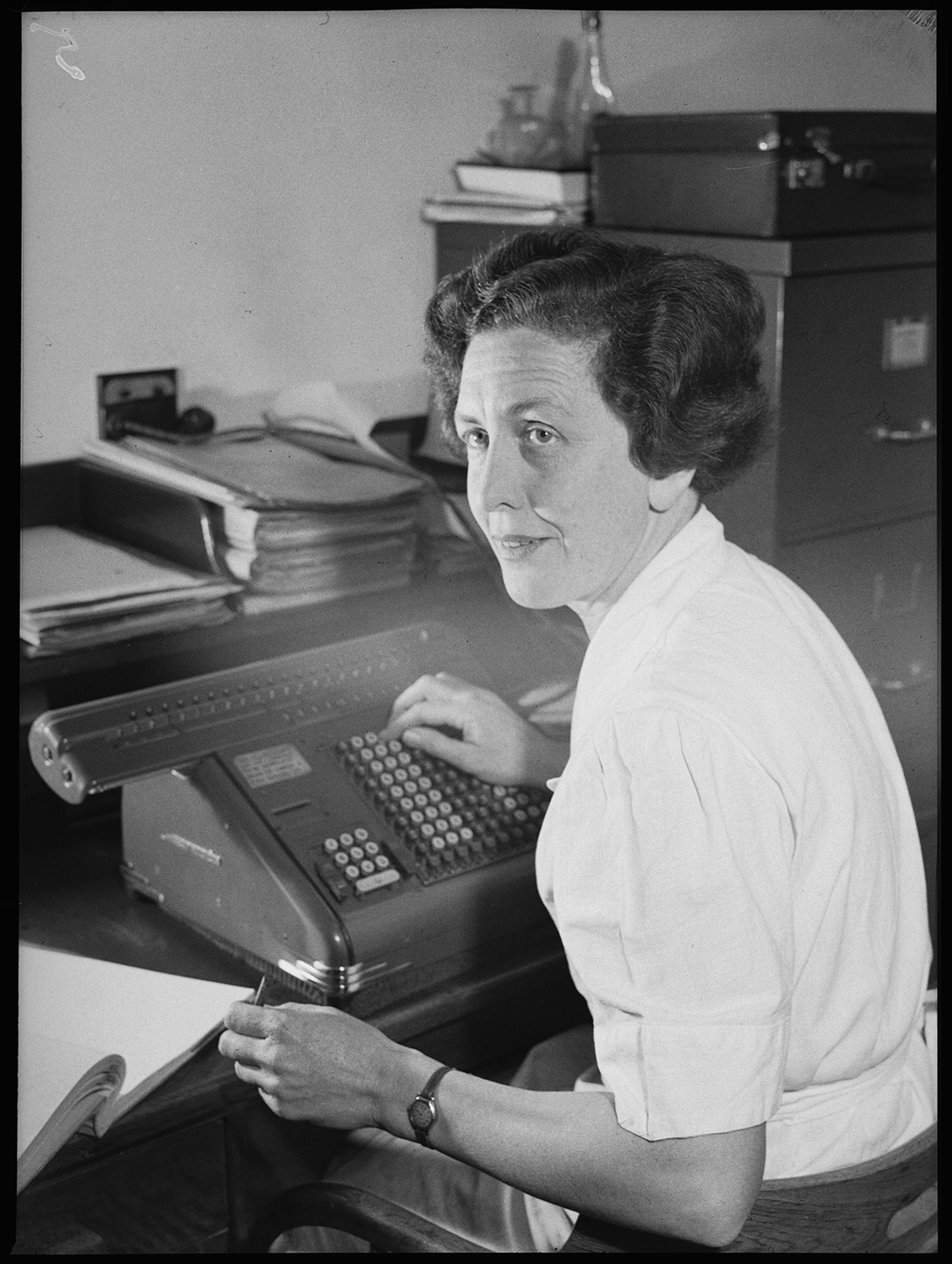

Personal information
- Born: 26 June 1913
- Died: 10 September 1997 (aged 84)
- Batting: Right-handed

International information
- National side: Australia

Career statistics
Competition	Test
Matches	7
Runs scored	177
Batting average	16.09
100s/50s	0/2
Top score	59
Balls bowled	96
Wickets	1
Bowling average	22.00
5 wickets in innings	0
10 wickets in match	0
Best bowling	1/6
Catches/stumpings	1/–
- Source: Cricinfo, 2 January 2008

Mary Clouston Dive OAM (26 June 1913 – 10 September 1997) was a scientist and an Australian cricketer who played seven women's Test matches between 1948 and 1951. Dive graduated from Sydney University with a science degree and was employed by the Commonwealth Scientific and Industrial Research Organisation (CSIRO) for most of her life. She was usually known as Mollie Dive or, less often, Molly Dive.

Dive was awarded the Medal of the Order of Australia in the 1987 Queen's Birthday Honours for "service to the sport of women's hockey and women's cricket".
