= Betty Birch =

English cricketer

Personal information
- Full name: Betty Dorothy Birch
- Born: 12 September 1923; Fulham, London, England
- Died: 20 September 2016 (aged 93); Devon, England
- Batting: Right-handed
- Bowling: Right-arm leg break
- Role: Batter

International information
- National side: England (1951–1958)
- Test debut (cap 36): 28 July 1951 v Australia
- Last Test: 21 March 1958 v Australia

Domestic team information
- Years: Team
- 1949–1960: Middlesex

Career statistics
Competition	WTest	WFC
Matches	8	33
Runs scored	286	943
Batting average	23.83	26.19
100s/50s	0/2	0/5
Top score	83*	83*
Balls bowled	18	240
Wickets	0	5
Bowling average	–	18.40
5 wickets in innings	0	0
10 wickets in match	0	0
Best bowling	–	2/7
Catches/stumpings	2/–	6/–
- Source: CricketArchive, 9 March 2021

Betty Dorothy Birch (12 September 1923 – 20 September 2016) was an English cricketer who played primarily as a right-handed batter. She appeared in eight Test matches for England between 1951 and 1958. She played domestic cricket for Middlesex for 12 years.
