= Barbara Murrey =

English cricketer

Personal information
- Full name: Barbara Murrey
- Born: 19 May 1924; Epsom, Surrey, England
- Died: August 2004 (aged 80); Hampshire, England
- Batting: Right-handed
- Role: Batter

International information
- National side: England (1951–1954)
- Test debut (cap 34): 16 June 1951 v Australia
- Last Test: 24 July 1954 v New Zealand

Domestic team information
- Years: Team
- 1949–1951: Surrey
- 1952: West

Career statistics
Competition	WTest	WFC
Matches	6	13
Runs scored	288	448
Batting average	32.00	24.88
100s/50s	0/2	0/2
Top score	62	62
Balls bowled	–	36
Wickets	–	1
Bowling average	–	36.00
5 wickets in innings	–	0
10 wickets in match	–	0
Best bowling	–	1/36
Catches/stumpings	5/–	9/–
- Source: CricketArchive, 9 March 2021

Barbara Murrey (19 May 1924 – August 2004), also known by her married name Barbara Sharrock, was an English cricketer who played as a right-handed batter. She appeared in 6 Test matches for England between 1951 and 1954. She mainly played domestic cricket for Surrey.
