= Jean Cummins =

English cricketer

Personal information
- Full name: Jean Mary Cummins
- Born: 3 July 1920; Croydon, Surrey, England
- Died: 29 March 1981 (aged 60); Croydon, Surrey, England
- Role: Batter

International information
- National side: England (1954)
- Test debut (cap 37): 12 June 1954 v New Zealand
- Last Test: 24 July 1954 v New Zealand

Domestic team information
- Years: Team
- 1949–1963: Surrey

Career statistics
Competition	WTest	WFC
Matches	3	20
Runs scored	90	661
Batting average	18.00	22.79
100s/50s	0/0	1/2
Top score	32	100
Catches/stumpings	0/–	6/–
- Source: CricketArchive, 9 March 2021

Jean Mary Cummins (3 July 1920 – 29 March 1981) was an English cricketer who played as an opening batter. She appeared in three Test matches for England in 1954, all against New Zealand. She played domestic cricket for Surrey.
