= Mary Spry =

English cricketer (1922-2002)

Personal information
- Full name: Florence Mary Spry
- Born: 9 August 1922; Birkenhead, Cheshire, England
- Died: November 2002 (aged 80); Southend-on-Sea, Essex, England
- Batting: Right-handed
- Role: Batter

International information
- National side: England (1951)
- Test debut (cap 35): 16 June 1951 v Australia
- Last Test: 28 June 1951 v Australia

Domestic team information
- Years: Team
- 1951: Middlesex

Career statistics
Competition	WTest	WFC
Matches	3	6
Runs scored	71	167
Batting average	14.20	18.55
100s/50s	0/0	0/0
Top score	35	44*
Catches/stumpings	1/–	2/–
- Source: CricketArchive, 9 March 2021

Florence Mary Spry (9 August 1922 – November 2002) was an English cricketer who played as a right-handed batter. She appeared in 3 Test matches for England in 1951, all against Australia. Her highest score of 35 came in her last match, which England won by 137 runs. She played domestic cricket for Middlesex.
