= Mavis Jones =

Australian cricketer

Cricket information
- Batting: Right-handed
- Bowling: Right-arm medium-fast

International information
- National side: Australia
- Test debut (cap 37): 16 June 1951 v England
- Last Test: 28 July 1951 v England

Career statistics
Competition	WTest
Matches	3
Runs scored	92
Batting average	15.33
100s/50s	0/0
Top score	39
Balls bowled	278
Wickets	10
Bowling average	12.00
5 wickets in innings	1
10 wickets in match	0
Best bowling	7/27
Catches/stumpings	1/–
- Source: Cricinfo, 22 February 2015

Mavis Jones (10 December 1922 - 1990) was an Australian cricketer. Jones was born in Melbourne, Victoria, and played three women's Test matches for the Australia national women's cricket team. She died in Lakes Entrance, Victoria.
