= Annie Geeves =

English cricketer

Personal information
- Full name: Annie Doris Geeves
- Born: 4 November 1914; Mansfield, Nottinghamshire, England
- Died: February 2006 (aged 91); Derbyshire, England
- Batting: Left-handed
- Bowling: Left-arm medium
- Role: Bowler

International information
- National side: England (1951)
- Only Test (cap 31): 16 June 1951 v Australia

Domestic team information
- Years: Team
- 1949: Nottinghamshire

Career statistics
Competition	WTest	WFC
Matches	1	8
Runs scored	5	106
Batting average	5.00	8.83
100s/50s	0/0	0/0
Top score	5	30
Balls bowled	72	1,320
Wickets	0	28
Bowling average	–	18.85
5 wickets in innings	0	2
10 wickets in match	0	0
Best bowling	–	5/43
Catches/stumpings	2/–	3/–
- Source: CricketArchive, 9 March 2021

Annie Doris Geeves (née Taylor; 4 November 1914 – February 2006) was an English cricketer who played as a left-arm medium bowler. She appeared in one Test match for England in 1951, against Australia. She scored five runs and failed to take a wicket. She played domestic cricket for Nottinghamshire.
