= Cecilia Robinson (cricketer) =

English cricketer (1924–2021)

Personal information
- Full name: Mary Cecilia Robinson
- Born: 22 May 1924; Canterbury, Kent, England
- Died: 3 November 2021 (aged 97)
- Batting: Right-handed
- Role: Batter

International information
- National side: England (1949–1963)
- Test debut (cap 26): 15 January 1949 v Australia
- Last Test: 29 June 1963 v Australia

Domestic team information
- Years: Team
- 1949–1967: Kent

Career statistics
Competition	WTest	WFC
Matches	14	58
Runs scored	829	2,809
Batting average	33.16	35.11
100s/50s	2/2	3/16
Top score	105	105*
Balls bowled	–	54
Wickets	–	1
Bowling average	–	27.00
5 wickets in innings	–	0
10 wickets in match	–	0
Best bowling	–	1/18
Catches/stumpings	9/–	47/–
- Source: CricketArchive, 10 March 2021

Mary Cecilia Robinson (22 May 1924 – 3 November 2021) was an English cricketer who played as a right-handed batter. Described in her Daily Telegraph obituary as a "dogged opener", she appeared in 14 Test matches for England, in as many years, between 1949 and 1963, captaining the side in six of those matches. She played domestic cricket for Kent. She was known by her fellow players as "Robbie".

Robinson is the first person born in Canterbury to play Test cricket for England. She scored two Test centuries, both against Australia, one in 1951 and the other in 1958. In 2020, Kent County Cricket Club awarded her a county cap, their seventh such award to a female cricketer.

== Life outside cricket ==
Her father, Arthur, was a canon of Canterbury Cathedral. She had two brothers, one of whom - John - became Bishop of Woolwich. She was educated at St Paul's Girls' School in London, where she learnt to play cricket, before going to a physical training college in Bedford. After World War Two, she became a games teacher at St Saviour's and St Olave's Church of England School in London. She had to leave when she decided to accept an invitation to take part in England's tour of Australia in 1948-9, raising money for the sea voyage by working on a poultry farm. The players had to raise about £200 each (then a substantial sum) for their return fare, as well as provide their own spending money.

Subsequently she taught games at Roedean School in Sussex for 32 years, as well as becoming senior house mistress of the junior house. She was also women's golf captain at Tenterden Golf Club in Kent. She never married.

Robinson died on 3 November 2021 in Folkestone, at the age of 97.

== Test centuries ==
Cecilia Robinson's Test centuries
No.	Runs	Match	Opponents	City/Country	Venue	Year
1	105	5	Australia	Scarborough, England	North Marine Road Ground	1951
2	102	11	Australia	Adelaide, Australia	Adelaide Oval	1958

== See also ==
- List of centuries in women's Test cricket
