= Myrtle Maclagan =

English cricketer (1911–1993)

Myrtle Maclagan MBE
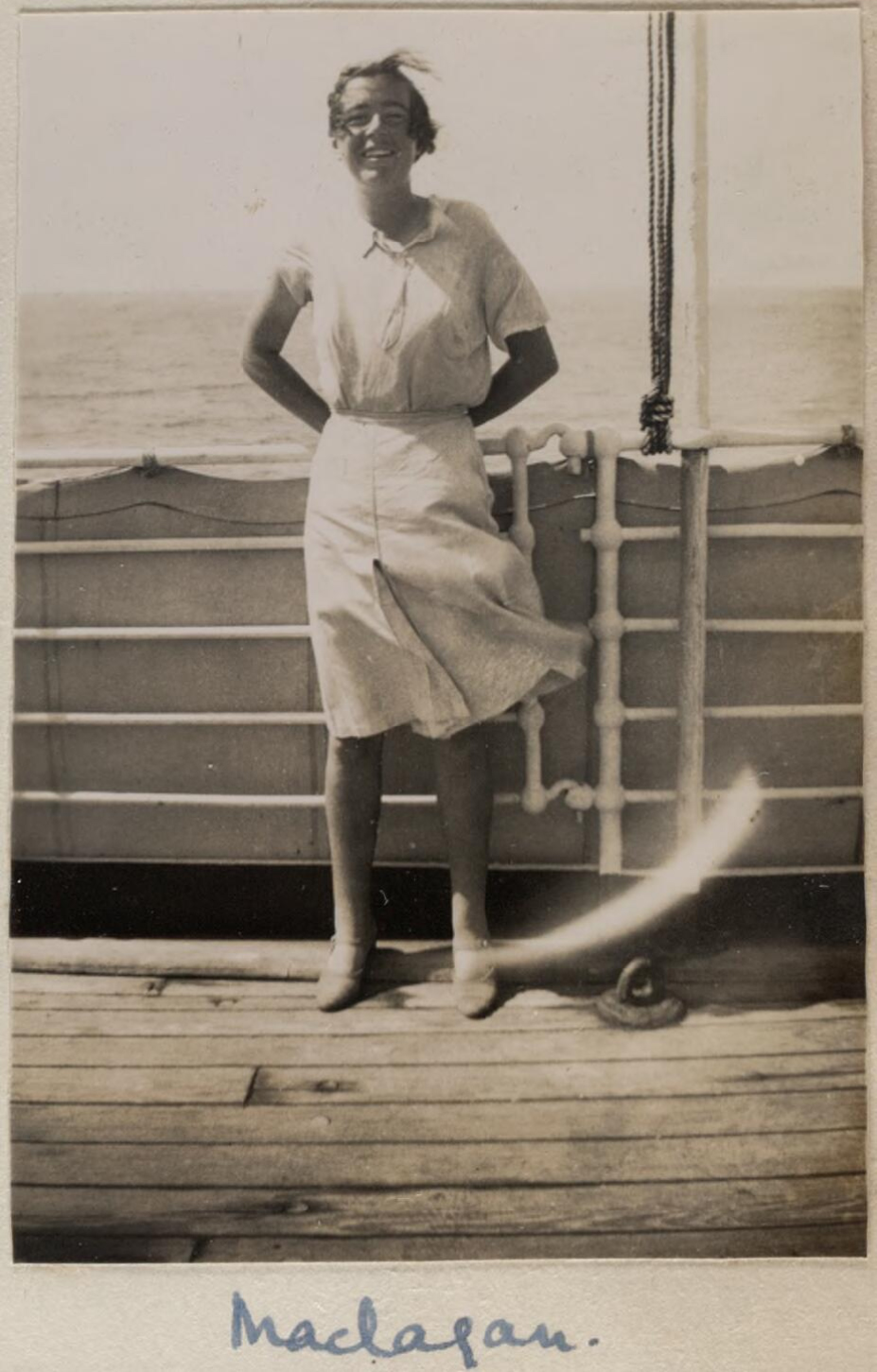

Personal information
- Full name: Myrtle Ethel Maclagan
- Born: 2 April 1911; Ambala, United Provinces, British India
- Died: 11 March 1993 (aged 81); Surrey, England
- Batting: Right-handed
- Bowling: Right arm off break
- Role: All-rounder

International information
- National side: England (1934–1951)
- Test debut (cap 5): 28 December 1934 v Australia
- Last Test: 31 July 1951 v Australia

Domestic team information
- Years: Team
- 1937–1951: Surrey

Career statistics
Competition	WTest	WFC
Matches	14	41
Runs scored	1007	2,282
Batting average	41.95	41.49
100s/50s	2/6	6/11
Top score	119	119
Balls bowled	3432	9,061
Wickets	60	185
Bowling average	15.58	12.02
5 wickets in innings	3	10
10 wickets in match	0	1
Best bowling	7/10	7/10
Catches/stumpings	12/–	33/–
- Source: CricketArchive, 12 March 2021

Myrtle Ethel Maclagan MBE (2 April 1911 – 11 March 1993) was an English cricketer who played as a right-handed batter and right-arm off break bowler. She appeared in 14 Test matches for England between 1934 and 1951. She played in the first-ever women's Test match, as well as captaining for England for two matches in 1951. She played domestic cricket for Surrey.

== Cricket career ==
Maclagan attended the Royal School, Bath, where she was in the cricket team for six years, once taking five wickets in five balls in an inter-school match. She played in the first women's Test match in 1934, and was one of the best-known women cricketers of her day, famous for making high scores against Australia.

On the very first day of women's Test cricket, at Brisbane in December 1934, Maclagan bowled the first ball, took the first wicket, had 7 wickets for 10 runs in the Australian innings and opened the England innings to score 72 runs. She scored the first Test century in women's cricket on 4 January 1935, when she made 119 for England against Australia at Sydney Cricket Ground. The English men's team had lost the Ashes a few months earlier, and The Morning Post praised Maclagan's batting prowess with the quatrain:

What matter that we lost, mere nervy men
Since England's women now play England's game,
Wherefore Immortal Wisden, take your pen
And write MACLAGAN on the scroll of fame.

After the 1934–35 tour to Australia and New Zealand, Maclagan also played against Australia in England in 1937. After the war, she returned to cricket, touring Australia and New Zealand again in 1948–49 and then appearing against Australia in England in 1951.

== Test centuries ==
Myrtle Maclagan's Test centuries
No.	Runs	Match	Opponents	City/Country	Venue	Year
1	119	2	Australia	Sydney, Australia	Sydney Cricket Ground	1935
2	115	6	Australia	Blackpool, England	Stanley Park	1937

== Later life ==
Maclagan served as an officer in the Auxiliary Territorial Service during World War II. She rejoined the Army in 1951, serving as Inspector PT in the Women's Royal Army Corps. In 1966 she was awarded an MBE for Army services.

== See also ==
- List of centuries in women's Test cricket
