= Mona Greenwood =

English cricketer

Personal information
- Full name: Mary Mona Greenwood
- Born: 10 August 1901; Halifax, Yorkshire, England
- Died: 4 April 1976 (aged 74); Scarborough, North Yorkshire, England
- Role: Batter

International information
- National side: England (1937)
- Test debut (cap 19): 26 June 1937 v Australia
- Last Test: 10 July 1937 v Australia

Domestic team information
- Years: Team
- 1937–1951: Yorkshire

Career statistics
Competition	WTest	WFC
Matches	2	11
Runs scored	36	342
Batting average	12.00	17.10
100s/50s	0/0	0/2
Top score	23	61
Balls bowled	–	132
Wickets	–	0
Bowling average	–	–
5 wickets in innings	–	0
10 wickets in match	–	0
Best bowling	–	–
Catches/stumpings	1/–	2/–
- Source: CricketArchive, 10 March 2021

Mary Mona Greenwood, married name Mona Bradbury (10 August 1901 – 4 April 1976) was an English cricketer who played as a batter. She appeared in two Test matches for England in 1937, both against Australia. She played domestic cricket for Yorkshire.
