= Megan Lowe =

English cricketer

Personal information
- Full name: Dorothy Megan Lowe
- Born: 17 November 1915; Syston, Leicestershire, England
- Died: 16 May 2017 (aged 101); Canterbury, Kent, England
- Bowling: Right-arm medium
- Role: Bowler

International information
- National side: England (1949)
- Test debut (cap 23): 15 January 1949 v Australia
- Last Test: 26 March 1949 v New Zealand

Domestic team information
- Years: Team
- 1949: Middlesex

Career statistics
| Competition | WTest | WFC |
|---|---|---|
| Matches | 4 | 21 |
| Runs scored | 77 | 170 |
| Batting average | 15.40 | 10.00 |
| 100s/50s | 0/0 | 0/0 |
| Top score | 25 | 25 |
| Balls bowled | 384 | 3,038 |
| Wickets | 4 | 49 |
| Bowling average | 31.75 | 19.63 |
| 5 wickets in innings | 0 | 1 |
| 10 wickets in match | 0 | 0 |
| Best bowling | 3/34 | 5/41 |
| Catches/stumpings | 0/– | 10/– |
- Source: CricketArchive, 10 March 2021

Dorothy Megan Lowe (17 November 1915 – 16 May 2017) was an English cricketer who played primarily as a right-arm medium bowler. She appeared in four Test matches for England in 1949. She played domestic cricket for Middlesex, as well as various composite XIs.

Lowe made her Test debut against Australia at Adelaide in January 1949. She played her last Test on the same tour, against New Zealand, at Auckland in March of the same year. She scored a total of 77 runs, with a highest score of 25 and took 4 wickets, with a best of 3/34.

She turned 100 in November 2015. In May 2017, Lowe died at home in Canterbury, aged 101.

== See also ==
- List of centenarians (sportspeople)
