= Dot Laughton =

Irene Doris Laughton
Personal information
- Born: 29 September 1913; Adelaide, South Australia
- Died: 8 March 1982 (aged 68); Adelaide, South Australia
- Nickname: Dot
- Batting: Right-handed
- Bowling: Right arm off break
- Role: Wicketkeeper

International information
- National side: Australia
- Only Test (cap 34): 19 February 1949 v England

Career statistics
Competition	Tests
Matches	1
Runs scored	47
Batting average	47.00
100s/50s	0/0
Top score	47
Balls bowled	-
Wickets	-
Bowling average	-
5 wickets in innings	-
10 wickets in match	-
Best bowling	-
Catches/stumpings	1/0
- Source: CricInfo, 10 December 2021

Irene Doris "Dot" Laughton (29 September 1913 – 8 March 1982) was a top-ranking sportswoman in South Australia representing Australia and South Australia in cricket and field hockey during the 1930s until retirement in 1953.

In Cricket, Laughton scored 40 centuries in first class cricket domestically and made the world-record score of 390 in 1949. A State captain, she was selected for Australia tour to England in 1951 where she scored 47 runs from her only appearance. An award 'The Dot Laughton Trophy' is awarded to outstanding South Australian women cricketers.

In field hockey, she was selected as left-full back for Australia in 1947 in a series versus New Zealand.
