= Joan Wilkinson =

English cricketer (1919–2002)

Personal information
- Full name: Joan Wilkinson
- Born: 5 April 1919; Foulridge, Lancashire, England
- Died: 17 April 2002 (aged 83); Foulridge, Lancashire, England
- Batting: Right-handed
- Bowling: Right-arm leg break
- Role: All-rounder

International information
- National side: England (1949–1958)
- Test debut (cap 28): 28 January 1949 v Australia
- Last Test: 21 March 1958 v Australia

Career statistics
Competition	WTest	WFC
Matches	13	53
Runs scored	436	1,819
Batting average	19.81	24.58
100s/50s	0/3	1/9
Top score	90	131
Balls bowled	360	1,353
Wickets	4	34
Bowling average	43.75	17.02
5 wickets in innings	0	1
10 wickets in match	0	0
Best bowling	1/9	5/29
Catches/stumpings	7/–	25/–
- Source: CricketArchive, 10 March 2021

Joan "Wilkie" Wilkinson (5 April 1919 – 17 April 2002) was an English cricketer who played as a right-handed batter and right-arm off break bowler. Making her Test debut against Australia, she appeared in 13 Test matches for England between 1949 and 1958. She played domestic cricket for various composite XIs, including teams representing the North of England.
