= Betty Wilson =

Australian cricketer (1921–2010)

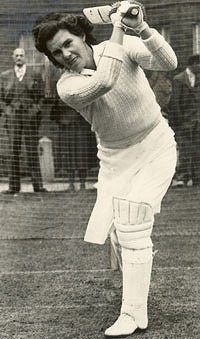
- Betty Wilson padded up in 1951

Personal information
- Full name: Betty Rebecca Wilson
- Born: 21 November 1921; Melbourne, Australia
- Died: 22 January 2010 (aged 88); Melbourne, Australia
- Batting: Right-handed
- Bowling: Right arm off break

International information
- National side: Australia
- Test debut (cap 25): 20 March 1948 v New Zealand
- Last Test: 24 March 1958 v England

Domestic team information
- Years: Team
- 1937/38–1957/58: Victoria

Career statistics
Competition	WTest	WFC
Matches	11	49
Runs scored	862	2,197
Batting average	57.46	43.94
100s/50s	3/3	6/8
Top score	127	145
Balls bowled	2,885	4,752
Wickets	68	200
Bowling average	11.80	9.80
5 wickets in innings	4	14
10 wickets in match	2	5
Best bowling	7/7	7/7
Catches/stumpings	10/–	29/–
- Source: CricketArchive, 13 January 2022

Betty Rebecca Wilson (21 November 1921 – 22 January 2010) was considered one of the greatest woman cricketers of all time. She represented Australia in Women's Test cricket between 1947–48 and 1957–58. Wilson batted right-handed, was a good off spin bowler and a superb fielder.

== Early life ==
Born in Melbourne, Wilson grew up in the inner neighbourhood of Collingwood and learned the game by playing against a lamp post in her street. At the age of 10, she joined the Collingwood Women's Cricket Club where she played with the adults. She made it to the Victoria second XI at the age of 14, and to the senior side at 16.

== Cricket career ==
The Second World War delayed her Test appearances till 1948. On her debut against New Zealand, she scored 90 and took 4/37 and 6/28. In her second Test in 1949, she scored 111 against England becoming the first Australian woman to score a Test century against England, and took nine more wickets. This made her the first woman cricketer to score a century and to take a five wicket haul in an innings of a Women's Test match.

She toured England in 1951 and scored 81 in the first Test at Scarborough. Against Yorkshire, she scored 100* in 77 minutes, leading Australia to a last ball win. After this series, she stayed in England for two and a half years.

In the St. Kilda Test against England in 1957–58, she became the first cricketer, male or female, to score a 100 and to take 10 wickets in a Test. On a wet wicket, she took 7/7 in the first innings which included the first ever hat-trick in a women's Test. The feat was not repeated until Shaiza Khan of Pakistan did the same in 2004. Wilson top scored with 12 in Australia's low first innings and a 100 in the second. Taking 4/9 in 19 overs in the second, she set another record for the best bowling of 11/16 in a match, which also stood as a record till 2004, Pakistan's Shazia Khan took 13/226 against the West Indies in Karachi.

Wilson played 11 Tests in her career, scoring 862 runs at 57.46 and taking 68 wickets at 11.80.

== Test match centuries ==
Betty Wilson's Test centuries
No.	Runs	Opponents	City/Country	Venue	Year
1	111	England	Adelaide, Australia	Adelaide Oval	1949
2	100	England	Melbourne, Australia	Junction Oval	1958
3	127	England	Adelaide, Australia	Adelaide Oval	1958

== Honours ==
In 1985, Wilson became the first woman cricketer to be inducted into the Australian Sporting Hall of Fame. In 1985–86, the Under-21 National Women's Cricket Championship was renamed the Betty Wilson Shield. In 1996–97, the age group was changed to Under-19.

In 2015, Wilson was inducted into the ICC Cricket Hall of Fame.

In 2017, Wilson was inducted into the Australian Cricket Hall of Fame. The Betty Wilson Young Player of the Year award was inaugurated at the 2017 Allan Border Medal Ceremony, to recognise a female cricketer who, prior to 5 December 2015, was aged under 25 and had played 10 or fewer matches.
