= Mary Johnson (cricketer) =

English cricketer (born 1924)

Personal information
- Full name: Winifred Mary Johnson
- Born: 7 November 1924; Hull, Yorkshire, England
- Bowling: Right-arm fast
- Role: Bowler

International information
- National side: England (1949–1954)
- Test debut (cap 22): 15 January 1949 v Australia
- Last Test: 24 July 1954 v New Zealand

Domestic team information
- Years: Team
- 1949–1956: Yorkshire

Career statistics
| Competition | WTest | WFC |
|---|---|---|
| Matches | 10 | 34 |
| Runs scored | 113 | 557 |
| Batting average | 9.41 | 13.26 |
| 100s/50s | 0/0 | 0/3 |
| Top score | 25* | 71 |
| Balls bowled | 1,689 | 5,286 |
| Wickets | 18 | 74 |
| Bowling average | 28.55 | 23.02 |
| 5 wickets in innings | 0 | 2 |
| 10 wickets in match | 0 | 0 |
| Best bowling | 4/18 | 6/43 |
| Catches/stumpings | 5/– | 11/– |
- Source: CricketArchive, 10 March 2021

Winifred Mary Johnson (born 7 November 1924) is an English former cricketer who played primarily as a right-arm pace bowler. She appeared in 10 Test matches for England between 1949 and 1954. She played domestic cricket for Yorkshire.

Johnson was also a PE teacher, employed at the Arnold School for Girls in Blackpool.
