= Barbara Wood (cricketer) =

English cricketer

Personal information
- Full name: Ruth Barbara Wood
- Born: 19 March 1917
- Died: 1998 (aged 80–81); Yorkshire, England
- Role: Bowler

International information
- National side: England (1949)
- Only Test (cap 29): 28 January 1949 v Australia

Domestic team information
- Years: Team
- 1937–1949: Yorkshire

Umpiring information
- WTests umpired: 1 (1954)

Career statistics
Competition	WTest	WFC
Matches	1	8
Runs scored	4	6
Batting average	4.00	2.00
100s/50s	0/0	0/0
Top score	4	4
Balls bowled	90	864
Wickets	1	14
Bowling average	53.00	20.71
5 wickets in innings	0	0
10 wickets in match	0	0
Best bowling	1/53	3/10
Catches/stumpings	0/–	1/–
- Source: CricketArchive, 10 March 2021

Ruth Barbara Wood (19 March 1917 – 1998) was an English cricketer who played as a pace bowler. She appeared in one Test match for England in 1949, against Australia. She played domestic cricket for Yorkshire.

In her only test innings, batting at 10, she scored 4 runs before being stumped. She took one wicket for 53 in Australia's first innings. The match, the second of the series, was drawn in three days.
