= Norma Whiteman =

Australian cricketer (1927–2023)

Personal information
- Full name: Betty Norma Johnston
- Born: 28 December 1927; Bathurst, New South Wales, Australia
- Died: 9 January 2023 (aged 95); Sydney, New South Wales, Australia
- Batting: Right-handed
- Bowling: Right-arm fast

International information
- National side: Australia
- Test debut (cap 27): 20 March 1948 v New Zealand
- Last Test: 28 July 1951 v England

Domestic team information
- Years: Team
- 1946/47–1950/51: New South Wales

Career statistics
Competition	WTest	WFC
Matches	7	31
Runs scored	151	449
Batting average	25.16	17.26
100s/50s	0/0	0/1
Top score	36*	53
Balls bowled	1,635	3,265
Wickets	22	74
Bowling average	20.54	16.17
5 wickets in innings	0	2
10 wickets in match	0	1
Best bowling	4/33	6/8
Catches/stumpings	12/–	32/–
- Source: ESPNcricinfo, 28 December 2022

Betty Norma Johnston (née Whiteman; 28 December 1927 – 9 January 2023) was an Australian cricketer. Whiteman played seven Test matches for the Australia women's national cricket team between 1948 and 1951.

Whiteman died on 9 January 2023, aged 95. At the time of her death, she was Australia's oldest living Test cricketer.
