= Alma Vogt =

Australian cricketer

Personal information
- Born: 25 February 1925; Melbourne, Victoria
- Died: 4 May 2006 (aged 81); Queensland
- Batting: Right-handed
- Bowling: Right arm fast

International information
- National side: Australia
- Only Test (cap 33): 15 January 1949 v England

Career statistics
| Competition | WTests |
|---|---|
| Matches | 1 |
| Runs scored | 3 |
| Batting average | 3.00 |
| 100s/50s | 0/0 |
| Top score | 3 |
| Balls bowled | 90 |
| Wickets | 0 |
| Bowling average |
| 5 wickets in innings | 0 |
| 10 wickets in match | 0 |
| Best bowling | - |
| Catches/stumpings | 0/- |
- Source: CricInfo, 19 February 2015

Alma Vogt (25 February 1925 – 4 May 2006) was an Australian cricket player. Vogt played one Test match for the Australia national women's cricket team. Vogt died in Queensland on 4 May 2006, at the age of 81.
