= Hazel Sanders =

English cricketer

Personal information
- Full name: Hazel Mary Sanders
- Born: 16 July 1926; Mitcham, Surrey, England
- Died: 29 December 1995 (aged 69); Shepway, Kent, England
- Batting: Right-handed
- Bowling: Right-arm slow
- Role: Batter

International information
- National side: England (1949–1958)
- Test debut (cap 27): 15 January 1949 v Australia
- Last Test: 21 February 1958 v Australia

Domestic team information
- Years: Team
- 1949–1959: Surrey

Career statistics
Competition	WTest	WFC
Matches	12	48
Runs scored	318	1,069
Batting average	15.14	18.43
100s/50s	0/2	0/4
Top score	54	54
Balls bowled	30	428
Wickets	0	15
Bowling average	–	14.13
5 wickets in innings	–	1
10 wickets in match	–	0
Best bowling	–	5/15
Catches/stumpings	15/–	33/–
- Source: CricketArchive, 10 March 2021

Hazel Mary Sanders (16 July 1926 – 29 December 1995) was an English cricketer who played as a right-handed batter. She appeared in 12 Test matches for England between 1949 and 1958. She played domestic cricket for Surrey for 11 years.

Sanders made her debut during England's first post-war tour of Australia and New Zealand in early 1949, reaching 54, her highest Test score, in a victory over New Zealand at Auckland. She scored another half-century, against Australia, at Scarborough in 1951.

Off the field, Sanders was a biochemist, who worked on lipids at the Courtauld Institute of Biochemistry at Middlesex Hospital. She published scientific papers on Lipids and Lipid Metabolism, describing a modification of an existing scientific process using column chromatography to separate and identify lipids from human brain cell matter, allowing phosphatidylserine to be isolated more simply and quickly.
