= Amy Hudson =

Australian cricketer

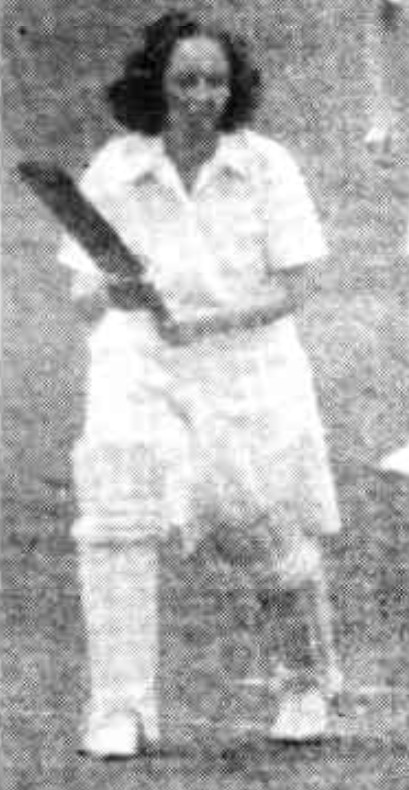

Personal information
- Full name: Amy Nielson Hudson
- Born: 5 February 1916; Penrith, New South Wales
- Died: 7 June 2003 (aged 87); New South Wales
- Batting: Right-handed
- Bowling: Right-arm leg-break; Right-arm medium

International information
- National side: Australia
- Test debut (cap 15): 18 January 1935 v England
- Last Test: 28 July 1951 v England

Career statistics
Competition	Test
Matches	9
Runs scored	451
Batting average	34.69
100s/50s	0/3
Top score	81*
Balls bowled	610
Wickets	16
Bowling average	16.25
5 wickets in innings	0
10 wickets in match	0
Best bowling	5/46
Catches/stumpings	3/–
- Source: CricInfo, 1 November 2014

Amy Nelson Hudson (5 February 1916 – 7 June 2003) was an Australian cricket player. She played in nine Test matches for the Australia national women's cricket team. Hudson was the 15th woman to play test cricket for the Australia national women's cricket team.
