= Dorothy McEvoy =

English cricketer

Personal information
- Full name: Dorothy Evelyn McEvoy
- Born: 30 July 1910; Liverpool, Lancashire, England
- Died: 20 April 1994 (aged 83); Worthing, West Sussex, England
- Bowling: Right-arm fast-medium
- Role: Bowler

International information
- National side: England (1949–1951)
- Test debut (cap 24): 15 January 1949 v Australia
- Last Test: 28 July 1951 v Australia

Domestic team information
- Years: Team
- 1937–1951: Surrey

Career statistics
Competition	WTest	WFC
Matches	5	23
Runs scored	33	237
Batting average	8.25	13.16
100s/50s	0/0	0/0
Top score	16	38
Balls bowled	930	4,169
Wickets	13	61
Bowling average	19.15	20.22
5 wickets in innings	1	2
10 wickets in match	0	0
Best bowling	5/23	5/23
Catches/stumpings	4/–	15/–
- Source: CricketArchive, 10 March 2021

Dorothy Evelyn McEvoy (30 July 1910 – 20 April 1994) was an English cricketer who played as a right-arm pace bowler. She appeared in five Test matches for England between 1949 and 1951. She played domestic cricket for Surrey.
