= Molly Hide =

English cricketer

Personal information
- Full name: Mary Edith Hide
- Born: 24 October 1913; Shanghai, China
- Died: 10 September 1995 (aged 81); Guildford, Surrey, England
- Batting: Right-handed
- Bowling: Right arm medium
- Role: All-rounder

International information
- National side: England (1934–1954)
- Test debut (cap 3): 28 December 1934 v Australia
- Last Test: 27 July 1954 v New Zealand

Domestic team information
- Years: Team
- 1937–1958: Surrey

Career statistics
Competition	WTest	WFC
Matches	15	48
Runs scored	872	2,967
Batting average	36.33	43.63
100s/50s	2/5	10/14
Top score	124*	145
Balls bowled	2,064	5,033
Wickets	36	115
Bowling average	15.25	13.37
5 wickets in innings	1	2
10 wickets in match	0	0
Best bowling	5/20	6/22
Catches/stumpings	10/–	29/–
- Source: CricketArchive, 12 March

Mary Edith "Molly" Hide (24 October 1913 – September 10, 1995) was an English cricketer who played as a right-handed batter and right-arm medium bowler. She appeared in 15 Test matches for England between 1934 and 1954. She was one of the great early women cricketers in England, and captained England for 17 years, between 1937 and 1954. She played domestic cricket for Surrey. In 1973 she was president of the Women's Cricket Association.

== Early life ==
Molly Hide was born in Shanghai, China and moved to England at the age of six. She learned to play cricket at the girls' school of Wycombe Abbey and later studied agriculture at Reading University.

== Career ==
Hide represented Worcestershire in representative matches in 1932 and 1933 and toured Australia and New Zealand with Betty Archdale's first English women touring team to those countries. She scored a hundred in the Christchurch Test, where England defeated New Zealand in a one-sided match.

Hide was given the captaincy of the South of England team in 1936 and, one year later, that of England against the touring Australia. The series ended 1-1, Hide's major contribution was 5 for 20 in the second innings at Blackpool where England won by 25 runs.

During World War II, she worked in her father's farm in Haslemere. Test cricket resumed after 11 years with a tour of Australia which England lost 0–1. Hide scored 63 & 124* in the drawn match at Sydney. She scored five hundreds in the tour including one in Colombo. She also captained England at home against Australia in 1951 and New Zealand in 1954. Hide was a quick scoring right-handed batsman and bowled medium-paced off-spinners.

In her youth she also played lacrosse for England and was thus a dual international for England. Hide never married.

According to G. D. Martineau,

The chief characteristic of Molly Hide on the cricket field was a very positive attitude that asserted what a game of cricket should be like. She put her ideas into practice, making great declarations, trusting her keen eyes, ready to hit the first ball for four, and always on the attack. There have been less chancy batsmen but her aim was ever to get on top of the bowling, so that the rate of scoring almost always quickened on her arrival. With a particularly strong on drive 'off her toes', she put character into her strokes, and there has been no better batsman.

== Test centuries ==
Molly Hide's Test centuries
No.	Runs	Match	Opponents	City/Country	Venue	Year
1	110	4	New Zealand	Christchurch, New Zealand	Lancaster Park	1935
2	124*	10	Australia	Sydney, Australia	Sydney Cricket Ground	1949
