= England women's cricket team in South Africa in 1960–61 =

English women's cricket team in South Africa in 1960-61
| | South Africa | England |
- Dates: 12 November 1960 – 16 January 1961
| Captains | Sheelagh Nefdt | Helen Sharpe |

Test series
- Result: England won the 4-match series 1–0
| Most runs | Eileen Hurly (240) | Polly Marshall (315) |
| Most wickets | Lorna Ward (9); Jennifer Gove (9) | Anne Sanders (17) |

The England women's cricket team toured South Africa in 1960–61, the first women's Test series ever in South Africa. England won the four match series 1–0, with three drawn Tests.

== Test series ==
=== 1st Test ===
2–5 December 1960
Scorecard

| South Africa | v | England |
| 211 (90.2 overs); Eileen Hurly 96*; Anne Sanders 4/57 (18.2 overs) | | 187 (76.1 overs); Ruth Westbrook 58; Lorna Ward 4/47 (23 overs) |
| 260/8d (139 overs); Sheelagh Nefdt 62*; Esme Irwin 3/42 (30 overs) | | 202/4 (59 overs); Helen Sharpe 49; Jennifer Gove 2/34 (12 overs) |

Match drawn
St George's Park, Port Elizabeth
Umpires: Tim Gibbon (SA) and G Minnaar (SA)

- South Africa Women won the toss and elected to bat.
- This was South African women's first ever Women's Test.
- Rachael Heyhoe-Flint, Mollie Hunt, Esme Irwin, Sheila Plant, Alison Ratcliffe, Margaret Rutherford and Kathleen Smith (Eng); Barbara Cairncross, Jennifer Gove, Pamela Hollett, Eileen Hurly, Joy Irwin, Audrey Jackson, Eleanor Lambert, Jean McNaughton, Sheelagh Nefdt, Yvonne van Mentz and Lorna Ward (SA) made their Test debut.

=== 2nd Test ===
17–20 December 1960
Scorecard

| England | v | South Africa |
| 351/6d (104 overs); Alison Ratcliffe 95; Yvonne van Mentz 4/95 (25 overs) | | 134 (95 overs); Eileen Hurly 37; Esme Irwin 4/46 (33 overs) |
| | | 140/8 (f/o) (82 overs); Beverly Lang 51; Sheila Plant 2/11 (12 overs) |

Match drawn
Wanderers, Johannesburg
Umpires: George Parry (SA) and Steward (SA)

- England Women won the toss and elected to bat.
- Barbara Pont (Eng); Beverly Lang and Maureen Payne (SA) made their Test debut.

=== 3rd Test ===
31 December 1960 –
3 January 1961
Scorecard

| South Africa | v | England |
| 151 (102.4 overs); Eileen Hurly 29; Anne Sanders 4/41 (27.4 overs) | | 269/8d (95.5 overs); Helen Sharpe 126; Jean McNaughton 6/39 (19 overs) |
| 166 (127.3 overs); Sheelagh Nefdt 68; Anne Sanders 3/28 (28.3 overs) | | 49/2 (19 overs); Ruth Westbrook 22*; Jennifer Gove 2/22 (8 overs) |

England Women won by 8 wickets
Kingsmead Cricket Ground, Durban
Umpires: Peter A'Bear (SA) and James Draper (SA)

- South Africa Women won the toss and elected to bat.
- Ann Jago (Eng) and Patricia Klesser (SA) made their Test debut.

=== 4th Test ===
13–16 January 1961
Scorecard

| England | v | South Africa |
| 223 (108.3 overs); Ruth Westbrook 87; Lorna Ward 5/18 (14.3 overs) | | 266/8d (137 overs); Yvonne van Mentz 105*; Anne Sanders 2/38 (31 overs) |
| 236/4d (88 overs); Helen Sharpe 70; Jennifer Gove 3/57 (22 overs) | | 126/4 (37 overs); Beverly Lang 58; Alison Ratcliffe 3/33 (6 overs) |

Match drawn
Newlands Cricket Ground, Cape Town
Umpires: Dal Collins (SA) and Neville Howell (SA)

- England Women won the toss and elected to bat.
- Dulcie Wood (SA) made her Test debut.

== Tour matches ==
=== 1-day tour match: England Women v Western Province Combined XI Women ===
12 November 1960
Scorecard

| Western Province Combined XI Women | v | England |
| 59 (42.3 overs); Christine Bald 17; Esme Irwin 3/10 (11.3 overs) | | 193/3d (38 overs); Helen Sharpe 88; G Ronaldson 1/21 (5 overs) |
| 75/4 (37 overs); J Littlewort 25*; Ruth Westbrook 1/2 (2 overs) |

Match drawn
Paarl Cricket Club Ground, Boland
Umpires: Rousseau and Walley

- Western Province won the toss and elected to bat.

=== 2-day tour match: England Women v Western Province Women ===
14,15 November 1960
Scorecard

| England | v | Western Province Women |
| 189 (66.4 overs); Polly Marshall 84*; Maureen Payne 9/56 (22.4 overs) | | 143 (94 overs); C Peirce 37; Mollie Hunt 6/27 (23 overs) |
| 106/3d (48 overs); Alison Ratcliffe 33*; N Dowling 1/21 (17 overs) | | 32 (18.2 overs); N Dowling 21; Mollie Hunt 7/12 (7.2 overs) |

England Women won by 120 runs
Newlands Cricket Ground, Cape Town
Umpires: Gunther Goldman (SA) and P Kruger (SA)

- England Women won the toss and elected to bat.

=== 2-day tour match: England Women v South African XI Women ===
19,21 November 1960
Scorecard

| England | v | South African XI Women |
| 205/6d (67.2 overs); Ruth Westbrook 58; Maureen Payne 3/84 (26 overs) | | 104 (52 overs); Eileen Hurly 52; Sheila Plant 6/30 (17 overs) |
| 19/1 (6.5 overs); Ruth Westbrook 10*; D Evenden 1/10 (3.5 overs) | | 171/9d (f/o) (63 overs); Joy Irwin 34; Anne Sanders 4/33 (14 overs) |

Match drawn
Ramblers Cricket Club Ground, Bloemfontein
Umpires: Harold Melzer and G Niddrie

- England Women won the toss and elected to bat.

=== 2-day tour match: England Women v Southern Transvaal Women ===
25,26 November 1960
Scorecard

| Southern Transvaal Women | v | England |
| 147 (68.3 overs); Yvonne van Mentz 68; Barbara Pont 4/16 (15 overs) | | 206/1d (52 overs); Helen Sharpe 103*; R Campbell 1/35 (14 overs) |
| 106/2 (53 overs); Barbara Cairncross 48*; Barbara Pont 1/13 (6 overs) |

Match drawn
Wanderers Stadium, Johannesburg
Umpires: Frank Osman and D Sutherland

- Southern Transvaal Women won the toss and elected to bat.

=== 2-day tour match: England Women v South African XI Women ===
9,10 December 1960
Scorecard

| South African XI Women | v | England |
| 190 (106.5 overs); Beverly Lang 56; Alison Ratcliffe 2/13 (4 overs) | | 190 (65 overs); Ruth Westbrook 34; Maureen Payne 5/54 (19 overs) |
| 91/7d (61 overs); Sheelagh Nefdt 36*; Polly Marshall 3/18 (21 overs) | | 94/0 (13.3 overs); Ruth Westbrook 61* |

England Women won by 10 wickets
Loftus Versfeld, Pretoria
Umpires: TV Burnard and George Hawkins

- South African XI Women won the toss and elected to bat.

=== 1-day tour match: England Women v Southern Transvaal B Women ===
14 December 1960
Scorecard

| Southern Transvaal B Women | v | England |
| 72 (50.2 overs); L Walker 19; Barbara Pont 2/8 (6.2 overs) | | 231/3d (58.4 overs); Rachael Heyhoe-Flint 102*; Doris Ten-Cate 1/97 (29.4 overs) |
| 69 (33 overs); Doris Ten-Cate 29; Ruth Westbrook 4/5 (5 overs) |

England Women won by an innings and 90 runs
Willowmoore Park, Benoni
Umpires: Louw and van der Sadt

- Southern Transvaal B Women won the toss and elected to bat.

=== 2-day tour match: England Women v Natal Women ===
22,23 December 1960
Scorecard

| Natal Women | v | England |
| 92 (104.2 overs); C Mortimer 24; Margaret Rutherford 2/4 (17 overs) | | 149/2d (40 overs); Ruth Westbrook 60*; Joy Irwin 1/22 (7 overs) |
| 41 (37 overs); Joy Irwin 6 Lorna Ward 6 Ann Jago 5/14 (16 overs) |

England Women won by an innings and 16 runs
Kingsmead Cricket Ground, Durban
Umpires: Leslie Lamble and Pritchard

- England Women won the toss and elected to field.

=== 1-day tour match: England Women v Border Women ===
7 January 1961
Scorecard

| Border Women | v | England |
| 60 (36 overs); R Knott 26; Ann Jago 4/3 (11 overs) | | 246/5d (53 overs); Kathleen Smith 102; S Gersowsky 4/62 (16 overs) |
| 61/3 (43 overs); A Cronin 30*; Esme Irwin 2/5 (8 overs) |

Match drawn
Jan Smuts Ground, East London
Umpires: TMA Gunton and Arthur Kidson

- Border Women won the toss and elected to bat.

=== 1-day single-innings tour match: England Women v Eastern Province Women ===
9 January 1961
Scorecard

| England; 251/9d (92 overs) | v | Eastern Province Women; 139 (61.4 overs) |
| Pamela Crain 44; Audrey Jackson 4/30 (22 overs) | | Audrey Jackson 39; Polly Marshall 5/30 (14.4 overs) |

England Women won by 112 runs
St George's Park, Port Elizabeth
Umpires: Millar and G Minnaar

- Eastern Province Women won the toss and elected to field.
