= Audrey Jackson =

South African cricketer

Personal information
- Full name: Audrey Jackson
- Born: 1944 (age 81–82); Port Elizabeth, South Africa
- Nickname: Little Audrey
- Batting: Left-handed
- Bowling: Right-arm fast
- Role: Bowler

International information
- National side: South Africa (1960–1961)
- Test debut (cap 6): 2 December 1960 v England
- Last Test: 13 January 1961 v England

Domestic team information
- Years: Team
- 1955/56–1960/61: Eastern Province

Career statistics
Competition	WTest
Matches	2
Runs scored	35
Batting average	17.50
100s/50s	0/0
Top score	24
Balls bowled	144
Wickets	2
Bowling average	29.50
5 wickets in innings	0
10 wickets in match	0
Best bowling	1/6
Catches/stumpings	0/–
- Source: CricketArchive, 22 February 2022

Audrey Wood (née Jackson; born 1944) is a South African former cricketer who played as a right-arm pace bowler. She appeared in two Test matches for South Africa in 1960 and 1961, both against England, and took South Africa's first ever Women's Test wicket. She played domestic cricket for Eastern Province, making her debut at age 12. She batted left-handed.

== Early life and career ==
Jackson grew up in Sydenham and, being the only girl on the street, played cricket there with the local boys. She was unaware of women's cricket until she saw a game in progress one afternoon in 1956. Later that year, she made her first appearance in provincial cricket. Her debut for Eastern Province, coming at the age of 12, almost certainly makes her the youngest senior provincial player in South African history.

Jackson was well known in South Africa for her fast bowling, and was even advised by teammates that it was not necessary to bowl so quickly. Recalling this, Jackson recounts: "Shame, I still remembers how I split one of the girl's fingers open with one of my deliveries." In 1960, eight days of trials were held to select a Test side to play the touring England team. Jackson, Eastern Province's only representative at the trials, caused an upset when she claimed the wickets of Joy Irwin and Eleanor Lambert, Natal's record-breaking openers for only 20 runs. Only the final day of the trial, she took the wickets of three of the previous day's high-scorers for 23 runs.

== Test career ==
Playing in South Africa's first Test match, Jackson opened the bowling alongside Lorna Ward. When she trapped Kathleen Smith lbw she became the first woman to take a Test wicket in South Africa. Jackson had put on 11 runs in South Africa's first-innings, and didn't bat as they declared the second-innings. She only bowled 11 overs in the match; five in the first-innings and six in the second, finishing with match figures of 1/29 as the match was drawn. Due to the expense involved, Jackson couldn't participate in the second and third Tests; "We had to pay all our own travelling expenses and all our kit. I remember paying £18 for my Springbok blazer. The hotels were paid for fortunately," Jackson remembers.

Just before the fourth Test, the England side played Eastern Province in a single-innings tour match. Jackson took 4/30 in the English innings, and then top-scored in the Eastern Province innings, scoring 39 before hitting her wicket. Jackson was able to travel with the English team to Cape Town to play in the fourth Test.

Jackson went wicket-less in the first-innings of the fourth Test, conceding 17 runs in her 7 overs. She followed this up with her highest Test score of 24, partnering Yvonne van Mentz for 74 runs. In the second-innings, she took 1/13 in 6 overs, and finished her Test career with a bowling average of 29.50.
