= Sheelagh Nefdt =

South African cricketer

Personal information
- Full name: Sheelagh Mary Nefdt
- Role: All-rounder

International information
- National side: South Africa (1960–1961)
- Test debut (cap 9): 2 December 1960 v England
- Last Test: 13 January 1961 v England

Domestic team information
- Years: Team
- 1951/52–1955/56: Western Province

Career statistics
Competition	WTest
Matches	4
Runs scored	211
Batting average	30.14
100s/50s	0/2
Top score	68
Balls bowled	174
Wickets	2
Bowling average	54.00
5 wickets in innings	0
10 wickets in match	0
Best bowling	1/16
Catches/stumpings	0/–
- Source: CricketArchive, 2 March 2021

Sheelagh Mary Nefdt (née Charlton) is a South African former cricketer who played as an all-rounder. She appeared in four Test matches for South Africa in 1960 and 1961, all against England, and captained the side throughout the series.

She played domestic cricket for Western Province, and in 1953–54, she made the first recorded hattrick in South African women's cricket at Cape Town, taking a double hattrick. Western Province went on to win the Simon Trophy that season, as they had in the two previous to it.

== Test career ==
She was named captain of the South African squad to play the touring English women in 1960–61. Sheelagh Nefdt batted at number five in the first Test, scoring 24 runs in the first-innings before being stumped. For the second-innings, she dropped herself one place down the batting order, to allow Eileen Hurly, scorer of 96* in the first-innings to come ahead of her. Hurly, however, was run out for just 38, while Nefdt made 62 before declaring the innings with South African leading by 284 runs. Nefdt bowled 16 overs between the two innings, claiming the wicket of Anne Sanders in the first, and Rachael Heyhoe in the second.

In the second Test, after England won the toss and scored 351, Nefdt and her South African team scored slowly, a first-innings of 134 taking 95 overs, with Nefdt contributing 8 to the score. Similar slow scoring in the second innings helped South Africa force the draw, still trailing by 77 runs with eight wickets down in their second innings following on when the match finished.

The third Test again saw South Africa dismissed cheaply twice. A 55-run fourth-wicket partnership in the first-innings between Nefdt and Hurly, and an 83-run fifth-wicket partnership between Nefdt and Barbara Cairncross in the second were the only highlights in a match that South Africa lost by eight wickets. Nefdt scored her second half-century in Test cricket during the second-innings, top-scoring among the South Africans with 68.

Sheelagh Nefdt fell for a duck in the first-innings of the final Test in Cape Town, a pitch that saw high-scoring innings from Ruth Westbrook and Helen Sharpe for England, while Yvonne van Mentz scored South Africa's first century in Test cricket. By promoting herself to open in the second-innings, Nefdt added 11 to the score before being caught and bowled by Anne Sanders for the second time in the match.
