= Beverly Lang =

South African cricketer

Personal information
- Full name: Beverly Lang
- Role: All-rounder

International information
- National side: South Africa (1960–1961)
- Test debut (cap 12): 17 December 1960 v England
- Last Test: 13 January 1961 v England

Domestic team information
- Years: Team
- 1952/53–1960/61: Western Province

Career statistics
Competition	WTest
Matches	3
Runs scored	177
Batting average	29.50
100s/50s	0/2
Top score	58
Balls bowled	462
Wickets	2
Bowling average	62.00
5 wickets in innings	0
10 wickets in match	0
Best bowling	1/31
Catches/stumpings	4/–
- Source: CricketArchive, 2 March 2022

Beverly Lang is a South African former cricketer who played as an all-rounder. She appeared in three Test matches for South Africa in 1960 and 1961, all against England. She played domestic cricket for Western Province.

== Career ==
An all-rounder, Lang made her first appearance against the touring England team in a tour match for Western Province. Opening the bowling, she remained wicket-less in the first-innings, with Maureen Payne taking all nine English wickets (Ann Jago retired hurt). She scored 30 with the bat playing at number four, and claimed the wicket of Mollie Hunt in the second-innings. In a match that England won by 120 runs, she could only manage one run as South Africa chased 153 in their second-innings. After missing the first Test at St George's Park, Lang was selected to play for South Africa XI Women the following week. Opening the batting alongside Eleanor Lambert, she made 56 runs in two hours and followed it up by taking two wickets as England matched the South African XI total of 190. With limited overs remaining in the two-day match, Lang scored 16 runs in a declared total of 91 for 7 in South Africa's second-innings; a total the English chased down in just 13.3 overs.

She made her Test debut during the second Test against England at Wanderers Stadium.
