= Barbara Cairncross =

South African cricketer

Personal information
- Full name: Barbara Cairncross
- Batting: Right-handed
- Role: Batter

International information
- National side: South Africa (1960–1961)
- Test debut (cap 1): 2 December 1960 v England
- Last Test: 31 December 1960 v England

Domestic team information
- Years: Team
- 1953/54–1960/61: Southern Transvaal

Career statistics
Competition	WTest
Matches	3
Runs scored	65
Batting average	10.83
100s/50s	0/0
Top score	24
Catches/stumpings	1/–
- Source: CricketArchive, 6 March 2022

Barbara Cairncross is a South African former cricketer who played as a right-handed batter. She appeared in three Test matches for South Africa in 1960 and 1961, all against England, scoring 65 runs in her six innings. She played domestic cricket for Southern Transvaal.

Cairncross made her first appearance in the series against England for South African XI Women, opening the innings alongside captain Joy Irwin. After making a duck in the first-innings, she scored 27 in the second, putting on 53 for the first-wicket with Irwin. In the subsequent tour match, she captained a Southern Transvaal side that included five players who would go on to play Test cricket for South Africa. Opening the batting once more, with Eileen Hurly this time, Cairncross fell for 17 as her side could only muster 147 runs, rescued by 68 from Yvonne van Mentz. In the second innings, needing 59 to avoid defeat, Cairncross remained 48* as the match was drawn.

On South Africa's Test debut, Cairncross scored 24 runs in the first-innings and then added 9 in the second before being run out. She failed to make double-figures in the second Test, falling for eight in the first-innings, and four in the second-innings as South Africa were forced to follow-on. Playing in the third Test, she lost her wicket for a duck in the first-innings, but managed to add 83 for the fifth-wicket with Sheelagh Nefdt to provide the only resistance as South Africa lost by an innings and eight wickets.
