= List of South Africa women Test cricketers =

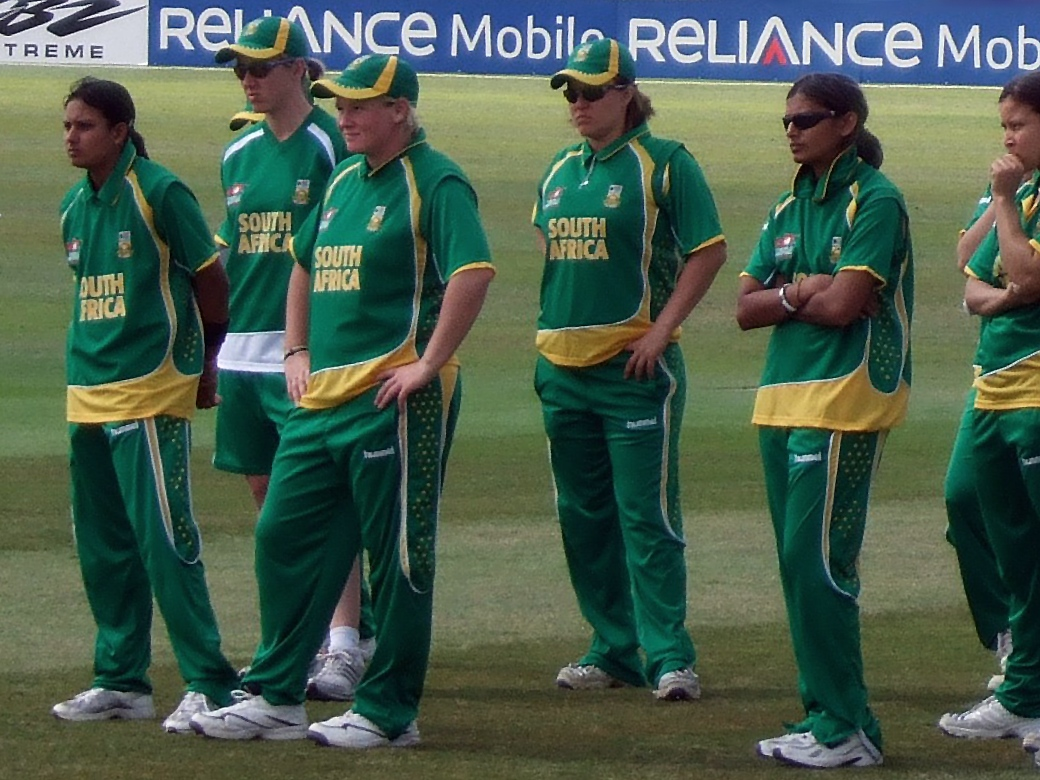
South Africa women at Taunton, 2009 ICC Women's World Twenty20

A women's Test match is an international four-innings cricket match held over a maximum of four days between two of the leading cricketing nations. Women's cricket was played in South Africa fairly regularly throughout the beginning of the 20th century, but died out during the Second World War. It was revived in 1949 by a group of enthusiasts, and in 1951 Netta Rheinberg, on behalf of the Women's Cricket Association, suggested that a South Africa Women's Cricket Association be formed, and encouraged the possibility that a series of matches could be played between the two associations. The South Africa & Rhodesian Women's Cricket Association (SA&RWCA) was officially formed in 1952. At their annual general meeting in January 1955, the SA&RWCA accepted an invitation from the Women's Cricket Association to join an International Women's Cricket Council that, in addition to South Africa, included England, Australia and New Zealand. They also agreed that international matches would be played between the four nations. In 1959, arrangements were made for the first international women's cricket tour of South Africa, as they would play host to the English team in 1960.

The first Test involving South Africa women was held at St George's Park, Port Elizabeth, the same venue as the one for first men's Test match in the country in 1889, and ended in a draw. South Africa then played a subsequent series against New Zealand in 1971–72. As part of the international campaign against apartheid, the Commonwealth of Nations signed the Gleneagles Agreement in 1977, excluding South Africa from competing in international sporting events. Because of this exclusion, they did not play another Test until hosting India in 2001–02, before facing England again in 2003, the Netherlands in 2007, India in 2014 and most recently England in 2022.

South Africa have played fourteen Test matches, seven of which were played pre-exclusion. Two players, Jennifer Gove and Lorna Ward, have played all seven matches pre-exclusion. Yvonne van Mentz, Brenda Williams, Mignon du Preez, and Marizanne Kapp are the only South African women to have scored Test centuries, while Jean McNaughton, Lorna Ward and Sunette Loubser have all taken five-wicket hauls, with Ward doing it on three occasions. This list contains every woman who has played Test cricket for South Africa. The list is initially arranged in the order in which each player won her Test cap. Where more than one player won her first Test cap in the same Test match, those players are initially listed alphabetically by the surname the player was using at the time of the match.

== Key ==
General

- ‡ – Captain
- † – Wicket-keeper
- First – Year of debut
- Last – Year of latest game
- Mat – Number of matches played
- Win% – Winning percentage

Batting

- Inn – Number of innings batted
- NO – Number of innings not out
- Runs – Runs scored in career
- HS – Highest score
- 100 – Centuries scored
- 50 – Half-centuries scored
- Avg – Runs scored per dismissal
- * – Batsman remained not out

Bowling

- Balls – Balls bowled in career
- Wkt – Wickets taken in career
- BBI – Best bowling in an innings
- BBM – Best bowling in a match
- Ave – Average runs per wicket

Fielding

- Ca – Catches taken
- St – Stumpings effected

== Test cricketers ==
Statistics are correct as of 17 December 2024 after South Africa's most recent Test match, against England.

South Africa women Test cricketers
No.	Name	First	Last	Mat	Batting							Bowling					Fielding		Ref
No.	Name	First	Last	Mat	Inn	NO	Runs	HS	100	50	Avg	Balls	Wkt	BBI	BBM	Ave	Ca	St	Ref
1	Barbara Cairncross	1960	1961	3	6	0	65	24	0	0	10.83	–	–	–	–	–	1	-	
2	Jennifer Gove	1960	1972	7	14	4	256	51*	0	1	25.60	683	9	3/57	4/91	31.55	10	-	
3	Pamela Hollett	1960	1961	4	7	0	71	21	0	0	10.14	102	1	1/46	1/46	59.00	1	-	
4	Eileen Hurly	1960	1961	4	8	1	240	96*	0	1	34.28	6	0	–	–	–	0	-	
5	Joy Irwin	1960	1961	3	6	0	40	20	0	0	6.66	42	0	–	–	–	0	-	
6	Audrey Jackson	1960	1961	2	2	0	35	24	0	0	17.50	144	2	1/6	1/29	29.50	0	-	
7	Eleanor Lambert †	1960	1960	2	4	0	65	34	0	0	16.25	–	–	–	–	–	1	0	
8	Jean McNaughton	1960	1961	3	6	1	45	28	0	0	9.00	276	6	6/39	6/54	19.33	4	-	
9	Sheelagh Nefdt ‡	1960	1961	4	8	1	211	68	0	2	30.14	174	2	1/16	2/58	54.00	0	-	
10	Yvonne van Mentz	1960	1961	4	8	2	186	105*	1	0	31.00	565	8	4/95	4/95	31.25	0	-	
11	Lorna Ward	1960	1972	7	11	2	52	17*	0	0	5.77	1,420	27	6/48	7/76	17.29	1	-	
12	Beverly Lang	1960	1961	3	6	0	177	58	0	2	29.50	462	2	1/31	1/53	62.00	4	-	
13	Maureen Payne ‡	1960	1972	5	5	1	39	33	0	0	9.75	814	8	2/31	3/101	40.50	2	-	
14	Patricia Klesser †	1960	1961	1	2	1	4	4	0	0	4.00	–	–	–	–	–	1	0	
15	Dulcie Wood †	1961	1961	1	1	1	3	3*	0	0	–	–	–	–	–	–	0	0	
16	Beverly Botha	1972	1972	3	6	2	139	72	0	1	34.75	6	0	–	–	–	3	-	
17	Carole Gildenhuys †	1972	1972	3	6	0	184	94	0	2	30.66	–	–	–	–	–	9	0	
18	Moira Jones	1972	1972	1	1	0	0	0	0	0	0.00	–	–	–	–	–	0	-	
19	Dawn Moe	1972	1972	3	6	0	108	39	0	0	18.00	270	1	1/51	1/66	98.00	1	-	
20	Wea Skog	1972	1972	3	4	3	19	11*	0	0	19.00	420	3	1/24	1/31	42.00	1	-	
21	Juanita van Zyl	1972	1972	1	1	0	6	6	0	0	6.00	–	–	–	–	–	1	-	
22	Denise Weyers	1972	1972	3	4	0	6	5	0	0	1.50	660	5	3/33	4/67	40.80	3	-	
23	Gloria Williamson	1972	1972	3	4	1	14	9	0	0	4.66	686	12	3/28	4/57	18.41	2	-	
24	Myrna Katz	1972	1972	2	3	0	46	29	0	0	15.33	–	–	–	–	–	1	-	
25	Brenda Williams	1972	1972	2	4	0	162	100	1	0	40.50	120	0	–	–	–	2	-	
26	Josephine Barnard	2002	2003	3	6	0	93	31	0	0	15.50	86	3	2/25	2/25	21.66	1	-	
27	Cri-Zelda Brits ‡	2002	2007	4	8	1	150	61	0	1	21.42	507	6	2/68	2/68	42.50	2	-	
28	Cindy Eksteen ‡	2002	2002	1	2	0	42	25	0	0	21.00	228	2	2/64	2/64	32.00	1	-	
29	Alison Hodgkinson ‡	2002	2003	3	6	0	239	95	0	2	39.83	–	–	–	–	–	3	-	
30	Kerri Laing	2002	2002	1	2	0	16	9	0	0	8.00	144	1	1/72	1/72	72.00	1	-	
31	Madelein Lotter	2002	2002	1	2	0	10	10	0	0	5.00	–	–	–	–	–	0	-	
32	Denise Reid	2002	2002	1	2	1	50	36	0	0	50.00	36	0	–	–	–	1	-	
33	Daleen Terblanche †	2002	2007	4	7	0	186	83	0	1	26.57	24	0	–	–	–	3	0	
34	Yulandi van der Merwe	2002	2003	3	6	1	79	52*	0	1	15.80	462	3	2/81	2/81	76.66	1	-	
35	Sune van Zyl	2002	2003	2	4	1	58	37	0	0	19.33	258	1	1/63	1/74	121.00	0	-	
36	Sunette Viljoen	2002	2002	1	2	0	88	71	0	1	44.00	–	–	–	–	–	0	-	
37	Claire Cowan	2003	2003	2	4	0	54	23	0	0	13.50	–	–	–	–	–	1	-	
38	Leighshe Jacobs	2003	2003	2	3	2	4	3*	0	0	4.00	276	4	2/72	2/72	44.50	0	-	
39	Johmari Logtenberg	2003	2007	3	5	0	109	74	0	1	21.80	162	1	1/47	1/47	71.00	0	-	
40	Alicia Smith	2003	2007	3	5	2	86	24*	0	0	28.66	336	4	2/4	3/18	34.00	1	-	
41	Charlize van der Westhuizen	2003	2003	2	4	0	159	83	0	1	39.75	240	3	2/49	2/49	38.66	0	-	
42	Nolu Ndzundzu	2003	2003	1	2	1	8	8	0	0	8.00	36	0	–	–	–	0	-	
43	Susan Benade	2007	2007	1	2	0	51	51	0	1	25.50	24	2	2/1	2/1	0.50	1	-	
44	Trisha Chetty †	2007	2014	2	3	0	93	56	0	1	31.00	–	–	–	–	–	2	3	
45	Shabnim Ismail	2007	2007	1	1	0	1	1	0	0	1.00	150	3	2/5	3/20	6.66	0	-	
46	Ashlyn Kilowan	2007	2007	1	1	1	28	28*	0	0	–	66	0	–	–	–	0	-	
47	Marcia Letsoalo	2007	2014	2	3	0	9	6	0	0	3.00	240	0	–	–	–	1	-	
48	Sunette Loubser	2007	2014	2	3	1	8	5	0	0	4.00	523	11	5/37	8/59	13.54	1	-	
49	Claire Terblanche	2007	2007	1	2	0	56	30	0	0	28.00	108	2	2/11	2/14	7.00	1	-	
50	Mignon du Preez ‡	2014	2014	1	2	0	119	102	1	0	59.50	6	0	–	–	–	0	-	
51	Yolani Fourie	2014	2014	1	2	0	0	00	0	0	0.00	108	1	1/79	1/79	79.00	0	-	
52	Marizanne Kapp	2014	2024	4	8	1	395	150	1	2	56.42	288	1	1/20	1/22	89.00	2	-	
53	Lizelle Lee	2014	2022	2	4	0	42	36	0	0	10.50	–	–	–	–	–	1	-	
54	Nadine Moodley	2014	2014	1	2	0	49	40	0	0	24.50	–	–	–	–	–	0	-	
55	Nonkhululeko Thabethe	2014	2014	1	2	0	2	2	0	0	1.00	–	–	–	–	–	0	-	
56	Chloe Tryon	2014	2024	3	6	1	119	64	0	1	23.80	302	4	3/81	3/81	50.00	0	-	
57	Dane van Niekerk	2014	2014	1	2	0	22	15	0	0	11.00	222	1	1/90	1/90	90.00	0	-	
58	Anneke Bosch	2022	2024	4	7	0	88	39	0	0	12.57	132	3	3/77	3/77	35.66	3	-	
59	Nadine de Klerk	2022	2024	4	7	0	114	61	0	1	16.28	481	4	2/96	2/96	82.00	1	-	
60	Lara Goodall	2022	2022	1	2	0	36	26	0	0	18.00	–	–	–	–	–	0	-	
61	Sinalo Jafta †	2022	2024	4	7	0	36	15	0	0	5.14	–	–	–	–	–	5	0	
62	Suné Luus ‡	2022	2024	4	8	0	299	109	1	2	37.37	276	0	–	–	–	3	-	
63	Nonkululeko Mlaba	2022	2024	4	7	1	46	15	0	0	7.66	769	13	6/67	10/157	37.38	0	-	
64	Tumi Sekhukhune	2022	2024	3	6	5	61	33*	0	0	61.00	324	5	2/35	3/72	43.80	1	-	
65	Andrie Steyn	2022	2022	1	2	0	11	8	0	0	5.50	–	–	–	–	–	1	-	
66	Laura Wolvaardt ‡	2022	2024	4	8	0	255	122	1	1	31.87	–	–	–	–	–	1	-	
67	Tazmin Brits	2024	2024	1	2	0	36	31	0	0	18.00	–	–	–	–	–	0	-	
68	Ayanda Hlubi	2024	2024	2	3	0	6	5	0	0	2.00	192	3	2/40	3/41	40.00	0	-	
69	Masabata Klaas	2024	2024	2	4	2	15	10*	0	0	7.50	228	3	3/85	3/85	53.00	0	-	
70	Delmi Tucker	2024	2024	2	4	0	64	64	0	0	16.00	254	3	2/141	2/160	76.00	1	-	
71	Annerie Dercksen	2024	2024	2	4	0	60	41	0	0	15.00	180	0	–	–	–	1	-	

== Test captains ==
No.	Name	First	Last	Mat	Won	Lost	Tied	Draw	Win%
1	Sheelagh Nefdt	1960	1961	4	0	1	0	3	0%
2	Maureen Payne	1972	1972	3	0	1	0	2	0%
3	Cindy Eksteen	2002	2002	1	0	1	0	0	0%
4	Alison Hodgkinson	2003	2003	2	0	1	0	1	0%
5	Cri-Zelda Brits	2007	2007	1	1	0	0	0	100%
6	Mignon du Preez	2014	2014	1	0	1	0	0	0%
7	Suné Luus	2022	2022	1	0	0	0	1	0%
8	Laura Wolvaardt	2024	2024	3	0	3	0	0	0%
Total		1960	2024	16	1	8	0	7	6.25%
