= South Africa women's national cricket team record by opponent =

Team's performance record

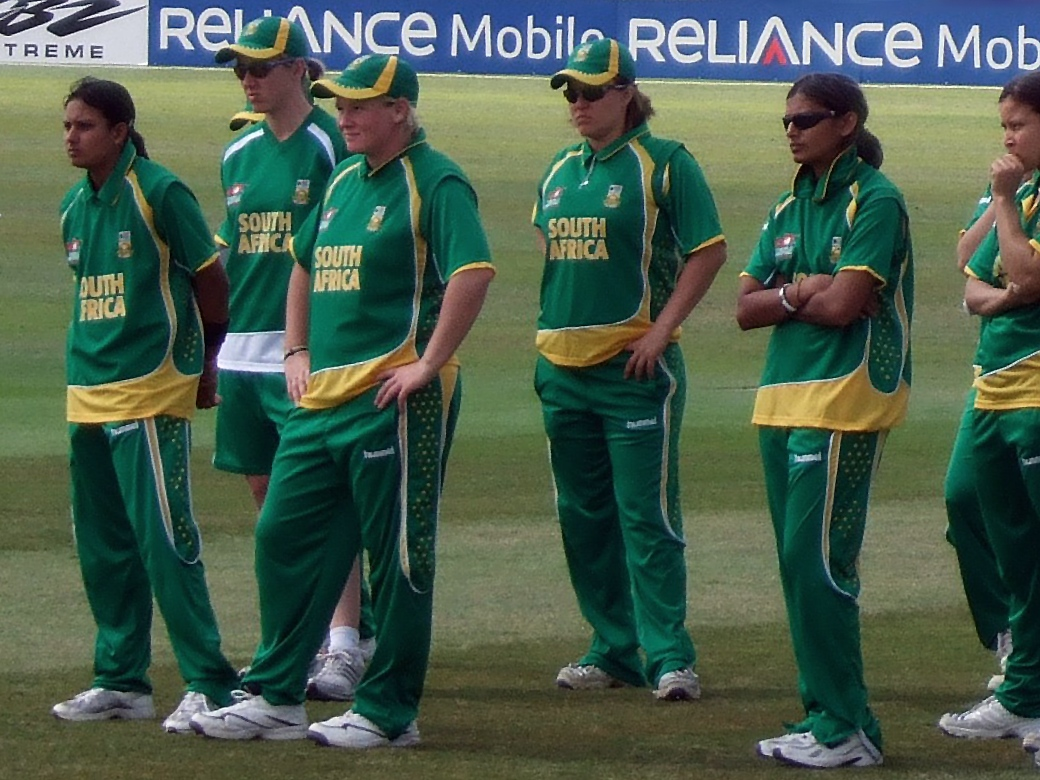
South Africa women at Taunton, 2009 ICC Women's World Twenty20

The South Africa women's national cricket team has represented South Africa in international women's cricket since 1960, when they hosted England, contesting four Test matches. Their next officially recognised series was against New Zealand, more than eleven years later. In 1977, they were excluded from competing in international sporting events, when the Commonwealth of Nations signed the Gleneagles Agreement as part of the international campaign against apartheid. Although the men's national team returned to international cricket in 1991, the women's team did not compete again until 1997, when they toured Ireland and England. Since then, the team has played regularly in One Day Internationals (ODI). The introduction of Twenty20 cricket in the early part of the 21st century has all but eliminated Test cricket from the woman's game. South Africa have played five Test matches since their return, and 71 Twenty20 Internationals (T20I) since their first such contest in 2007.

South Africa have played four different sides in women's Test cricket, with England their most frequent opponent, having faced them in six Tests. The only side that South Africa have beaten in Test cricket are the Netherlands, who South Africa have played once, in 2007. South Africa have similarly faced England more times than any other team in women's One Day International cricket, playing 43 matches. As such, England have recorded the most victories against South Africa, beating them 33 times. South Africa have beaten Pakistan more times than any other country, triumphing on 21 occasions against them. In women's T20Is, South Africa have as well played England the most, and lost to them on thirteen occasions. South Africa have recorded the most victories against Ireland, beating them in nine of their meetings.

== Key ==
- M – Denotes the number of matches played
- W – Denotes the number of wins for South Africa against the listed opponent
- L – Denotes the number of losses for South Africa against the listed opponent
- T – Denotes the number of ties between South Africa and the listed opponent
- D – Denotes the number of draws between South Africa and the listed opponent
- NR – Denotes the number of no results between South Africa and the listed opponent
- Win% – Win percentage (in ODI and T20I cricket, a tie counts as half a win, and no results are disregarded)
- Loss% – Loss percentage
- Draw% – Draw percentage
- First – Year of the first match between South Africa and the listed opponent
- Last – Year of the latest match between South Africa and the listed opponent

== Test cricket ==
South Africa women Test cricket record by opponent
Opponent	M	W	L	T	D	Win%	Loss%	Draw%	First	Last
England	6	0	2	0	4	0.00	33.33	66.66	1960	2003
India	2	0	2	0	0	0.00	100.00	0.00	2002	2014
Netherlands	1	1	0	0	0	100.00	0.00	0.00	2007	2007
New Zealand	3	0	1	0	2	0.00	33.33	66.66	1972	1972
Total	12	1	5	0	6	8.33	41.66	50.00	1960	2014

== One Day International ==
South Africa women One Day International record by opponent
Opponent	M	W	L	T	NR	Win%	First	Last
Australia	15	0	14	1	0	3.33	1997	2022
Bangladesh	20	17	3	0	0	85.00	2012	2023
Denmark	1	1	0	0	0	100.00	1997	1997
England	43	9	33	0	1	21.42	1997	2022
India	28	12	15	0	1	44.44	1997	2022
Ireland	20	18	1	0	1	94.73	1997	2022
Netherlands	7	7	0	0	0	100.00	2000	2011
New Zealand	20	8	12	0	0	40.00	1999	2023
Pakistan	28	21	5	1	1	79.62	1997	2023
Sri Lanka	20	14	4	0	2	77.77	2000	2019
West Indies	33	16	10	3	4	60.34	2005	2022
Total	235	123	97	5	10	55.77	1997	2023

== Twenty20 International ==
South Africa women Twenty20 International record by opponent
Opponent	M	W	L	T	NR	Win%	First	Last
Australia	10	1	9	0	0	10.00	2009	2024
Bangladesh	14	11	2	0	1	78.57	2012	2023
England	24	4	19	0	1	16.66	2007	2023
India	16	5	9	0	2	31.25	2014	2023
Ireland	13	11	2	0	0	84.61	2008	2022
Namibia	1	0	1	0	0	0.00	2024	2024
Netherlands	1	1	0	0	0	100.00	2010	2010
New Zealand	16	4	11	0	1	25.00	2007	2023
Pakistan	21	11	10	0	0	52.38	2010	2023
Sri Lanka	14	10	4	0	0	71.42	2012	2023
Tanzania	1	1	0	0	0	100.00	2024	2024
Thailand	1	1	0	0	0	100.00	2020	2020
West Indies	22	7	14	0	1	31.81	2009	2023
Total	154	67	81	0	6	43.13	2007	2024
