= Jean McNaughton =

South African cricketer

Personal information
- Full name: Jean Fay McNaughton
- Born: 10 April 1936 (age 90); Johannesburg, South Africa
- Batting: Right-handed
- Bowling: Right-arm medium-fast
- Role: Bowler

International information
- National side: South Africa (1960–1961)
- Test debut (cap 8): 2 December 1960 v England
- Last Test: 13 January 1961 v England

Domestic team information
- Years: Team
- 1954/55–1960/61: Southern Transvaal

Career statistics
Competition	WTest
Matches	3
Runs scored	45
Batting average	9.00
100s/50s	0/0
Top score	28
Balls bowled	276
Wickets	6
Bowling average	19.33
5 wickets in innings	1
10 wickets in match	0
Best bowling	6/39
Catches/stumpings	4/–
- Source: CricketArchive, 6 March 2022

Jean Fay Field (née McNaughton; born 10 April 1936) is a South African former cricketer who played as a right-arm medium-fast bowler. She appeared in three Test matches for South Africa in 1960 and 1961, all against England. She was the first South African woman to take a five-wicket haul in a Test match. She played domestic cricket for Southern Transvaal.

== Career ==
Part of the Southern Transvaal women's cricket team, McNaughton made her first appearance on the English tour in 1960–61 for her club side. Batting at number five, she scored 15 runs in 22 minutes. In the English innings, she only bowled four overs, taking no wickets and conceding 22 runs.

Playing in South Africa's first Test match she made a pair, becoming only the second woman, after England's player/manager Netta Rheinberg in 1949, to do so on debut. She also remained wicket-less in the match, bowling a total of nine overs. She did not play in the second Test, and scored one run in each of her two innings for South African XI women against England during a tour match.

Back in the team for the third Test at Sahara Stadium Kingsmead, Durban, McNaughton claimed six of the eight English wickets to fall in their first-innings, making her the first South African woman to take a five-wicket haul in Test cricket. In spite of her achievement, England won the match by eight wickets. In the final Test of the series, she scored her highest total in Test cricket, hitting 28 runs to help give her team a first-innings lead, and support Yvonne van Mentz as she closed in on her century.
