= Dulcie Wood =

South African cricketer

Personal information
- Full name: Dulcie Wood
- Role: Wicket-keeper

International information
- National side: South Africa (1961)
- Only Test (cap 15): 13 January 1961 v England

Domestic team information
- Years: Team
- 1953/54–1960/61: Southern Transvaal

Career statistics
Competition	WTest
Matches	1
Runs scored	3
Batting average	–
100s/50s	0/0
Top score	3*
Catches/stumpings	0/0
- Source: CricketArchive, 5 March 2022

Dulcie Wood is a South African former cricketer who played as a wicket-keeper. She appeared in one Test match for South Africa in 1961, against England. She played domestic cricket for Southern Transvaal.

She made appearances against England during the 1960–61 tour for both South African XI and Southern Transvaal before replacing Patricia Klesser as wicket-keeper for the fourth Test. After scoring ducks in both the tour matches, she batted at number ten in the Test match. She scored three runs before South Africa declared; the match ended a draw.
