= Dawn Moe =

South African cricketer (born 1952)

Personal information
- Full name: Dawn Moe
- Born: 1952 (age 73–74); South Africa
- Batting: Right-handed
- Bowling: Right-arm off break
- Role: All-rounder

International information
- National side: South Africa (1972)
- Test debut (cap 19): 25 February 1972 v New Zealand
- Last Test: 24 March 1972 v New Zealand

Domestic team information
- Years: Team
- 1968/69–1978/79: Natal

Career statistics
Competition	WTest
Matches	3
Runs scored	108
Batting average	18.00
100s/50s	0/0
Top score	39
Balls bowled	270
Wickets	1
Bowling average	98.00
5 wickets in innings	0
10 wickets in match	0
Best bowling	1/51
Catches/stumpings	1/–
- Source: CricketArchive, 4 March 2022

Dawn Moe (born 1952) is a South African former cricketer who played as a right-handed batter and right-arm off break bowler. She appeared in three Test matches for South Africa in 1972, all against New Zealand, scoring 108 runs and taking one wicket. She played domestic cricket for Natal.
