= Beverly Botha =

South African cricketer (born 1953)

Personal information
- Full name: Beverly Anne Botha
- Born: 23 October 1953 (age 73); Johannesburg, South Africa
- Batting: Right-handed
- Role: Batter

International information
- National side: South Africa (1972)
- Test debut (cap 16): 25 February 1972 v New Zealand
- Last Test: 24 March 1972 v New Zealand

Domestic team information
- Years: Team
- 1971/72–1975/76: Southern Transvaal

Career statistics
Competition	WTest
Matches	3
Runs scored	139
Batting average	34.75
100s/50s	0/1
Top score	72
Balls bowled	6
Wickets	0
Bowling average	–
5 wickets in innings	0
10 wickets in match	0
Best bowling	–
Catches/stumpings	3/–
- Source: CricketArchive, 5 March 2022

Beverly Anne Botha (born 23 October 1953) is a South African former cricketer who played as a right-handed batter. She appeared in three Test matches for South Africa in 1972, all against New Zealand, scoring 139 runs with a high score of 72. She played domestic cricket for Southern Transvaal.
