= Moira Jones =

South African cricketer (born 1942)

Personal information
- Full name: Moira Jones
- Born: 1942 (age 83–84); South Africa
- Role: Batter

International information
- National side: South Africa (1972)
- Only Test (cap 18): 25 February 1972 v New Zealand

Domestic team information
- Years: Team
- 1965/66–1971/72: Natal

Career statistics
Competition	WTest
Matches	1
Runs scored	0
Batting average	0.00
100s/50s	0/0
Top score	0
Catches/stumpings	0/–
- Source: CricketArchive, 4 March 2022

Moira Jones (born 1942) is a South African former cricketer who played as a batter. She appeared in one Test match for South Africa in 1972, against New Zealand, falling for a duck in her only innings. She played domestic cricket for Natal.
