= Jennifer Gove =

South African cricketer

Personal information
- Full name: Jennifer Anne Gove
- Born: 28 August 1940 (age 86); Durban, South Africa
- Batting: Right-handed
- Role: All-rounder

International information
- National side: South Africa (1960–1972)
- Test debut (cap 2): 2 December 1960 v England
- Last Test: 24 March 1972 v New Zealand

Domestic team information
- Years: Team
- 1958/59–1971/72: Natal

Career statistics
Competition	WTest
Matches	7
Runs scored	256
Batting average	25.60
100s/50s	0/1
Top score	51*
Balls bowled	683
Wickets	9
Bowling average	31.55
5 wickets in innings	0
10 wickets in match	0
Best bowling	3/57
Catches/stumpings	10/–
- Source: CricketArchive, 5 March 2022

Jennifer Anne Gove (born 28 August 1940) is a South African former cricketer who played as an all-rounder. She appeared in seven Test matches for South Africa between 1960 and 1972, and is the side's leading run-scorer in Test cricket, with 256 runs. She played domestic cricket for Natal.

== Cricket career ==
Gove made her debut for South Africa in their maiden Test match. Facing the touring England at St George's Park in Port Elizabeth, Gove batted at number eight in the first innings and number nine in the second, scoring 4 and 40 runs respectively. Her bowling was also used in the match, and she claimed two wickets in the second innings, dismissing Kathleen Smith caught and bowled, and trapping Ruth Westbrook leg before wicket. She scored 13 runs in the second match of the series, and did not take a wicket. She took wickets in both of the final two matches, collecting three at Durban and four in Cape Town, and though she did not surpass her innings of 40 runs from the first match, she did accumulate 90 runs across the two games. At the end of the series, she was South Africa's joint-leading wicket-taker, with nine wickets, though Lorna Ward had a superior average, taking her nine at 25.33, in contrast to Gove's 30.55.

Over eleven years later, Gove participated in South Africa's next officially sanctioned women's Test series, played against New Zealand. In the first Test, Gove scored 13 runs in the first innings, and 36* in the second, but in the following match, she failed to reach double figures in either innings. In the third and final Test of the series, after a first innings score of 3, Gove remained unbeaten on 51 when South Africa declared their second innings closed. It was the final match of Gove's international career, and the score of 51* remained her highest total in Test cricket. Her seven women's Test appearances for South Africa is the most for the country, level with Ward. Although Gove's total of 256 runs in women's Test cricket is the highest by a South African, her career average of 25.60 is ranked eighteenth amongst her compatriots.
