= New Zealand women's cricket team in South Africa in 1971–72 =

New Zealand women's cricket team in South Africa in 1971-72
	South Africa	New Zealand
- Dates: 19 February 1972 – 24 March 1972
Captains	Maureen Payne	Trish McKelvey

Test series
- Result: New Zealand won the 3-match series 1–0
Most runs	Carole Gildenhuys (184)	Judi Doull (228)
Most wickets	Lorna Ward (18)	Jill Saulbrey (15)

The New Zealand women's cricket team toured South Africa in 1971–72, playing three Test matches. New Zealand won the series 1–0, with two drawn Tests.

== Test series ==
=== 1st Test ===
25–28 February 1972
Scorecard

New Zealand	v	South Africa
251 (107.4 overs); Janice Stead 49; Lorna Ward 5/47 (21 overs)		165 (121.3 overs); Beverly Botha 72; Jill Saulbrey 4/34 (48 overs)
222/4d (111 overs); Trish McKelvey 117*; Gloria Williamson 2/27 (16 overs)		173/2 (92 overs); Carole Gildenhuys 94; Pat Carrick 1/43 (18 overs)

Match drawn
Newlands Cricket Ground, Cape Town
Umpires: BF Hubbard and Ronnie Pilowski

- New Zealand Women won the toss and elected to bat.
- Ethna Rouse (NZ); Beverly Botha, Carole Gildenhuys, Moira Jones, Dawn Moe, Wea Skog, Juanita van Zyl, Denise Weyers and Gloria Williamson (SA) made their Test debut.

=== 2nd Test ===
10–13 March 1972
Scorecard

New Zealand	v	South Africa
168 (96.2 overs); Janice Stead 40; Gloria Williamson 3/28 (18.2 overs)		111 (91 overs); Carole Gildenhuys 62; Jill Saulbrey 5/32 (39 overs)
220/8d (129 overs); Carol Marett 45*; Lorna Ward 3/38 (28 overs)		89 (81.2 overs); Brenda Williams 28; Jackie Lord 5/24 (23.2 overs)

New Zealand Women won by 188 runs
Kingsmead Cricket Ground, Durban
Umpires: Pieter Elffers and Lionel Hornby (SA)

- South Africa Women won the toss and elected to field.
- Carol Marett (NZ); Myrna Katz and Brenda Williams (SA) made their Test debut.

=== 3rd Test ===
24–27 March 1972
Scorecard

South Africa	v	New Zealand
114 (83.4 overs); Brenda Williams 30; Jackie Lord 4/30 (24 overs)		209 (108.1 overs); Judi Doull 52; Lorna Ward 6/48 (32.1 overs)
242/3d (146 overs); Brenda Williams 100; Carol Marett 1/50 (26 overs)		117/4 (39 overs); Judi Doull 52*; Gloria Williamson 2/40 (12 overs)

Match drawn
Wanderers, Johannesburg
Umpires: Unknown

- South Africa Women won the toss and elected to bat.

== Tour matches ==
New Zealand played six matches, coming against:

19–21 February 1972
Scorecard

New Zealand	v	Transvaal

Match drawn
Wanderers Stadium, Johannesburg

23 February 1972
Scorecard

Western Province	v	New Zealand

Match drawn
Stellenbosch

3–4 March 1972
Scorecard

New Zealand	v	South African XI Women

Match drawn
St George's Park, Port Elizabeth

6–7 March 1972
Scorecard

Women's Invitation XI	v	New Zealand
41 (33.1 overs); Doris Ten-Cate 12; Pat Carrick 4/7 (9.1 overs)		164/5d (56 overs); Judi Doull 80; Doris Ten-Cate 2/36 (14 overs)
226 (116 overs); LJ Clifford 66; Carol Marett 4/31 (20 overs)		104/3 (34.5 overs); Jackie Lord 28*; L van der Maas 2/27 (12 overs)

New Zealand Women won by 7 wickets
Jan Smuts Ground, East London

- New Zealand Women won the toss and elected to field.

15–16 March 1972
Scorecard

Natal	v	New Zealand
84 (69.4 overs); Moira Jones 37; Jenny Olson 4/13 (15 overs)		215/2d (65.4 overs); Shirley Cowles 105; I Iverson 1/59 (24 overs)
56 (53.5 overs); Dawn Moe 41*; Glenys Page 5/13 (16.5 overs)

New Zealand Women won by an innings and 75 runs
Kingsmead Cricket Ground, Durban

- Natal Women won the toss and elected to bat.

18 March 1972
Scorecard

Transvaal B 124	v	New Zealand; 128/4

New Zealand Women won by 6 wickets
Marks Park Sports Club, Johannesburg
