= Myrna Katz =

South African cricketer

Personal information
- Full name: Myrna Aileen Katz
- Born: Johannesburg, South Africa
- Role: Batter

International information
- National side: South Africa (1972)
- Test debut (cap 24): 10 March 1972 v New Zealand
- Last Test: 24 March 1972 v New Zealand

Domestic team information
- Years: Team
- 1965/66–1971/72: Southern Transvaal

Career statistics
Competition	WTest
Matches	2
Runs scored	46
Batting average	15.33
100s/50s	0/0
Top score	29
Catches/stumpings	1/–
- Source: CricketArchive, 5 March 2022

Myrna Aileen Katz is a retired South African cricketer who played as a batter. She played in two Test matches for South Africa in 1972, both against New Zealand, and scored 46 runs in three innings. She also played domestic cricket for Southern Transvaal.
