= Gloria Williamson =

Gloria Williamson may refer to:

- Gloria Williamson (cricketer)
- Gloria Williamson (politician)
- Gloria Williams, American singer born Gloria Jean Williamson
