= Patricia Klesser =

South African cricketer

Personal information
- Full name: Patricia Klesser
- Role: Wicket-keeper

International information
- National side: South Africa (1960–1961)
- Only Test (cap 14): 31 December 1960 v England

Domestic team information
- Years: Team
- 1951/52–1957/58: Northern Transvaal

Career statistics
Competition	WTest
Matches	1
Runs scored	4
Batting average	4.00
100s/50s	0/0
Top score	4
Catches/stumpings	1/0
- Source: CricketArchive, 4 March 2022

Patricia Klesser is a South African former cricketer who played as a wicket-keeper. She made appearances against England during their 1960/61 tour for both South African XI and Southern Transvaal B before replacing Eleanor Lambert as wicket-keeper for the third Test match, the only match she played for South Africa. She batted at number eleven in both innings, and scored 4 & 0* as South Africa lost by 8 wickets. She primarily played domestic cricket for Northern Transvaal.
