= Joy Irwin =

South African cricketer

Personal information
- Full name: Joy Irwin
- Role: Batter

International information
- National side: South Africa (1960–1961)
- Test debut (cap 5): 2 December 1960 v England
- Last Test: 31 December 1960 v England

Domestic team information
- Years: Team
- 1951/52: Durban
- 1952/53–1960/61: Natal

Career statistics
Competition	WTest
Matches	3
Runs scored	40
Batting average	6.66
100s/50s	0/0
Top score	20
Balls bowled	42
Wickets	0
Bowling average	–
5 wickets in innings	0
10 wickets in match	0
Best bowling	–
Catches/stumpings	0/–
- Source: CricketArchive, 5 March 2022

Joy Irwin is a South African former cricketer who played as a batter. She appeared in three Test matches for South Africa in 1960 and 1961, all against England, scoring 40 runs in her six innings. She played domestic cricket for Durban and Natal.

== Career ==
Irwin, a record-breaking opening batsman for Natal, was selected to play for South Africa women against the touring English women in 1960–61. In the first tour match, playing for South African XI Women, Irwin scored 5 & 34 opening alongside Barbara Cairncross as the South African team forced a draw after following on.
