= Esme Irwin =

English cricketer

Personal information
- Full name: Esme Irwin
- Born: 13 June 1931; Hanwell, Middlesex, England
- Died: 18 August 2001 (aged 70); Ickenham, Middlesex, England
- Bowling: Right-arm medium
- Role: Bowler

International information
- National side: England (1960–1961)
- Test debut (cap 53): 2 December 1960 v South Africa
- Last Test: 13 January 1961 v South Africa

Domestic team information
- Years: Team
- 1955–1970: Middlesex

Umpiring information
- WODIs umpired: 2 (1976–1979)
- WT20Is umpired: 4 (1973–1990)

Career statistics
| Competition | WTest | WFC |
|---|---|---|
| Matches | 4 | 8 |
| Runs scored | 3 | 44 |
| Batting average | – | 14.66 |
| 100s/50s | 0/0 | 0/0 |
| Top score | 2* | 35 |
| Balls bowled | 1,056 | 1,440 |
| Wickets | 10 | 15 |
| Bowling average | 25.00 | 29.73 |
| 5 wickets in innings | 0 | 0 |
| 10 wickets in match | 0 | 0 |
| Best bowling | 4/46 | 4/46 |
| Catches/stumpings | 0/– | 0/– |
- Source: CricketArchive, 7 March 2021

Esme Rosemary Irwin (13 June 1931 – 18 August 2001) was an English cricketer who played primarily as a right-arm pace bowler. She appeared in 4 Test matches for England in 1960 and 1961, all against South Africa. She played domestic cricket for Middlesex.
