= Brenda Williams =

South African cricketer (born 1949)

Personal information
- Full name: Brenda Glynis Williams
- Born: 6 December 1949 (age 76); Johannesburg, South Africa
- Batting: Right-handed
- Bowling: Right-arm off break
- Role: All-rounder

International information
- National side: South Africa (1972)
- Test debut (cap 25): 10 March 1972 v New Zealand
- Last Test: 24 March 1972 v New Zealand

Domestic team information
- Years: Team
- 1971/72–1980/81: Southern Transvaal

Career statistics
Competition	WTest
Matches	2
Runs scored	162
Batting average	40.50
100s/50s	1/0
Top score	100
Balls bowled	120
Wickets	0
Bowling average	–
5 wickets in innings	0
10 wickets in match	0
Best bowling	–
Catches/stumpings	2/–
- Source: CricketArchive, 5 March 2022

Brenda Glynis Williams (born 6 December 1949) is a South African former cricketer who played as a right-handed batter and right-arm off break bowler. She appeared in two Test matches for South Africa in 1972, both against New Zealand, and scored the side's second century in Women's Test matches, scoring 100 her second match. She played domestic cricket for Southern Transvaal.
