= Alison Ratcliffe =

English cricketer

Personal information
- Full name: Alison Barbara Ratcliffe
- Born: 10 October 1934 (age 92); Bacup, Lancashire, England
- Batting: Right-handed
- Bowling: Right-arm leg break
- Role: All-rounder

International information
- National side: England (1960–1961)
- Test debut (cap 55): 2 December 1960 v South Africa
- Last Test: 13 January 1961 v South Africa

Domestic team information
- Years: Team
- 1954: East Anglia
- 1963–1965: Kent

Career statistics
Competition	WTest	WFC
Matches	4	7
Runs scored	226	284
Batting average	45.20	35.50
100s/50s	0/1	0/1
Top score	95	95
Balls bowled	420	420
Wickets	12	12
Bowling average	17.58	17.58
5 wickets in innings	0	0
10 wickets in match	0	0
Best bowling	4/50	4/50
Catches/stumpings	5/–	6/–
- Source: CricketArchive, 7 March 2021

Alison Barbara Ratcliffe (born 10 October 1934) is an English former cricketer who played as a right-handed batter and right-arm leg break bowler. She appeared in four Test matches for England in 1960 and 1961, all against South Africa. She mainly played domestic cricket for Kent, as well as one match for East Anglia.
