= Pamela Hollett =

South African cricketer

Personal information
- Full name: Pamela Hollett
- Role: All-rounder

International information
- National side: South Africa (1960–1961)
- Test debut (cap 3): 2 December 1960 v England
- Last Test: 13 January 1961 v England

Domestic team information
- Years: Team
- 1958/59–1960/61: Southern Transvaal

Career statistics
Competition	WTest
Matches	4
Runs scored	71
Batting average	10.14
100s/50s	0/0
Top score	21
Balls bowled	102
Wickets	1
Bowling average	59.00
5 wickets in innings	0
10 wickets in match	0
Best bowling	1/46
Catches/stumpings	1/–
- Source: CricketArchive, 6 March 2022

Pamela Hollett is a South African former cricketer who played as an all-rounder. She appeared in four Test matches for South Africa between in 1960 and 1961, all against England, scoring 71 runs in her seven innings. She played domestic cricket for Southern Transvaal.
