= Ann Jago =

English cricketer (born 1939)

Personal information
- Full name: Ann Jago
- Born: 20 February 1939 (age 87); Kingston upon Hull, Yorkshire, England
- Role: Bowler

International information
- National side: England (1960–1961)
- Test debut (cap 59): 31 December 1960 v South Africa
- Last Test: 13 January 1961 v South Africa

Domestic team information
- Years: Team
- 1957–1961: Kent

Career statistics
Competition	WTest	WFC
Matches	2	7
Runs scored	7	16
Batting average	7.00	8.00
100s/50s	0/0	0/0
Top score	6	6*
Balls bowled	270	600
Wickets	1	8
Bowling average	59.00	14.75
5 wickets in innings	0	1
10 wickets in match	0	0
Best bowling	1/17	5/14
Catches/stumpings	1/–	4/–
- Source: CricketArchive, 16 November 2023

Ann Stubbs (née Jago; born 20 February 1939) is an English former cricketer who played primarily as a bowler. She appeared in two Test matches for England in 1960 and 1961, against South Africa. She played domestic cricket for Kent.

Jago's parents were both full-time artists. She was educated at Wolverhampton Girls' High School, where she played in the cricket team alongside Rachael Heyhoe Flint and Jacqueline Elledge. She studied at Dartford College of Physical Education in Kent, founded as Madame Bergman Österberg's Physical Training College and now part of the University of Greenwich, where Heyhoe was a fellow student. Jago and Heyhoe are said to have chosen Dartford as their college because Mary Duggan, the England cricket captain and "the best coach they knew of", was a lecturer there, Jago later worked as a physical education teacher at Hatton School in Sevenoaks.

She married New Zealander Alister Stubbs, who she met when touring New Zealand after her cricket tour. They live at Waitomo on North Island, with their three adult children and several grandchildren, on land where the grandchildren are the fifth generations of Stubbs. She enjoys watercolour painting. Caves on the Stubbs' land are of interest to scientists, and have been the location for the discovery of new species of spiders.
