= Wendy Flavell =

British physics professor

Wendy Flavell CChem CPhys FInstP
- Born: Wendy Ruth Flavell; 1 September 1961 (age 65); Bilston, England
- Education: Wolverhampton Girls' High School; University of Oxford (BA, DPhil)
- Awards: Royal Society University Research Fellow
- Scientific career
- Fields: Photoemission; Photovoltaics
- Workplaces: University of Manchester; UMIST; Daresbury Laboratory; Imperial College London
- Thesis: Electron spectroscopy of metal oxides (1986)
- Doctoral advisor: P. A. Cox
- Website: www.research.manchester.ac.uk/portal/wendy.flavell.html

Wendy Ruth Flavell CChem CPhys FInstP (born 1 September 1961) is Vice Dean for Research and a Professor of Surface Physics in the School of Physics and Astronomy at the University of Manchester. Her research investigates the electronic structure of complex metal oxides, chalcogenides, photoemission and photovoltaics.

== Education and early life ==
Flavell was born in Bilston to Maurice and June Flavell. She was educated at Wolverhampton Girls' High School and studied physics (Bachelor of Arts) at the University of Oxford followed by a Doctor of Philosophy degree in 1986. Her doctoral research investigated electron spectroscopy of metal oxides and supervised by P.A. Cox.

== Career and research ==
Flavell joined Imperial College London as a Royal Society University Research Fellow. In 1990 Flavell joined the University of Manchester Institute of Science and Technology (UMIST) in the Department of Chemistry. In 1998 Flavell became the sixth woman in the United Kingdom to be appointed Professor of Physics. She launched a scheme to promote women in science. She was part of the strategy group that designed the 4GLS at Daresbury Laboratory in 2004. She is a member of the University of Manchester Living Lab.

Flavell is interested in using nanoparticles and Quantum dots for efficient fuel cells and new materials for photovoltaics. She works on scanning tunnelling microscopy (STM), X-ray absorption near edge structure (NEXAFS) and extended X-ray absorption fine structure. She has studied titanium dioxide and Tin(IV) Oxide. She is interested in the surface reactivity of nanocrystals and dynamics of charge carriers in solar cells. She attempts to understand how solar cells age at the surface, in efforts to design passivation strategies. Flavell demonstrated that cadmium telluride quantum dots can have near unity quantum yields. In 2014 she served as deputy chair of the physics panel of the Research Excellence Framework (REF). She served on the Council of the Institute of Physics in 2017 and on the Newton International Fellowship committee for the Royal Society. Her research has been funded by the Engineering and Physical Sciences Research Council (EPSRC) and Science and Technology Facilities Council (STFC).

=== Public engagement ===
In 2011 Flavell's research group demonstrated their work on quantum dots at the Royal Society Summer Exhibition. She has delivered a Pint of Science talk and discussed the photon on In Our Time in 2015.
