= Constance Wood =

British radiotherapist

Dr Constance Wood FRCR
- Born: Constance Annie Poyser Wood; 1897; Wolverhampton
- Died: 11 October 1985 (aged 88)
- Education: Wolverhampton Girls' High School, Newnham College, Cambridge, King's College Hospital
- Known for: pioneering radiology
- Medical career
- Profession: Doctor
- Field: Oncology
- Institutions: Royal Cancer Hospital, Hammersmith Hospital
- Sub-specialties: Radiology
- Notable works: First medical linear accelerator and cyclotron

Constance "Connie" Annie Poyser Wood (1897–1985) was a pioneer of radiotherapy, leading research units in London when the speciality was being established.

== Early life and education ==
She was born in Wolverhampton in 1897. She went to Wolverhampton Girls' High School where she was captain of the hockey team and head girl. She gave up an interest in languages after nursing her brother who was wounded in the Great War. She then studied medicine at Newnham College, Cambridge from 1917 to 1920 and was then one of the first three female medical students to be trained at King's College Hospital, despite resistance to the admission of women at that time.

== Radiology ==
From 1927, she worked as a clinical assistant at the Royal Cancer Hospital in Fulham Road, specialising in the use of radium to treat cancer. She had to resign from her position there after a favourable report on her work by Sir William Bragg was broadcast by BBC News on 6 December 1938, which was thought to breach a requirement for prior approval by the hospital. She continued as head of research at the Radium Institute in London. In 1942, she became director of the Radiotherapeutic Research Unit at Hammersmith Hospital where, in 1952, she introduced an 8 MeV linear accelerator – the first to be used for medical treatment. With her deputy, Louis Harold Gray, she then organised the construction of the first cyclotron to be installed in a hospital and this was inaugurated by the Queen in 1955.

One of her patients was the brother of Máire Mhac an tSaoi, Séamus MacEntee. While she was lecturing students about his case, he put his pet white rat down her neck and the "reaction was gratifyingly feminine".
