= Barbara Pont =

English cricketer

Personal information
- Full name: Barbara Grace Pont
- Born: 20 December 1933 (age 92); Hastings, Sussex, England
- Batting: Right-handed
- Bowling: Right-arm medium
- Role: Bowler

International information
- National side: England (1960–1961)
- Test debut (cap 58): 17 December 1960 v South Africa
- Last Test: 31 December 1960 v South Africa

Domestic team information
- Years: Team
- 1955–1968: Sussex

Career statistics
Competition	WTest
Matches	2
Runs scored	–
Batting average	–
100s/50s	–/–
Top score	–
Balls bowled	30
Wickets	0
Bowling average	–
5 wickets in innings	0
10 wickets in match	0
Best bowling	–
Catches/stumpings	2/–
- Source: CricketArchive, 6 March 2021

Barbara Grace Pont (born 20 December 1933) is an English former cricketer who played as a right-handed batter and right-arm medium bowler. She appeared in two Test matches for England in 1960 and 1961, both against South Africa. She played domestic cricket for Sussex.
