= Wolverhampton Girls' High School =

Location
- Tettenhall Road; Wolverhampton, West Midlands, WV6 0BY; England; 52.591°N 2.156°W

Information
- Other names: WGHS, Wolverhampton Girls' High, Girls' High
- Type: Grammar school; academy
- Motto: Latin: Ludus Supra Praemium (The Game Before the Prize)
- Religious affiliation: N/A
- Established: 1911
- Department for Education URN: 140798 Tables
- Ofsted: Reports
- Chairman of governors: Peter Ribbins
- Headteacher: Trudi Young
- Staff: ~60
- Gender: Girls
- Age: 11 to 18
- Enrolment: ~1015
- Average class size: 30
- Houses: Audley, Ferrers, Paget and Stafford
- Colours: Red, navy blue, black
- Publication: WGHS News, WGHS Old Girls' Newsletter
- Former pupils: WGHS Old Girls Union
- Website: www.wghs.org.uk

Wolverhampton Girls' High School is a grammar school for girls in Wolverhampton in the West Midlands of England.

== Overview ==
Wolverhampton Girls' High School, founded in 1911, educates girls from the age of 11 to 18. There are 1178 girls enrolled, including about two hundred in the sixth form. It was previously awarded the status of Language College in the UK's Specialist Schools Programme, and converted to academy status on 1 April 2014.

== Entrance ==
Entry to the school is via the Shropshire, Walsall and Wolverhampton Grammar Schools Consortium (Adams' Grammar, Newport Girls High, Queen Mary Grammar and High School and Wolverhampton Girls High School), testing Verbal Reasoning, Non-Verbal Reasoning and Numerical Reasoning. These tests take place during Year 6 of primary education (in September). 11+ examinations must be taken in order to be enrolled in the school.

== Curriculum ==
There used to be four forms according to which house a student belonged to, however the school now has six forms in each year. Subjects are taught in form groups in years 7 to 9 and then in option groups for the more senior years.

Girls take English and at least three foreign languages, religious studies, history, geography, mathematics, physics, biology, chemistry, technology, information technology, art, music and physical education. Foreign languages are chosen from French, German, Latin, Russian and Spanish.

At GCSE level, alongside English, mathematics, biology, chemistry and physics, students are required to take at least one foreign language, and one of geography, history, and religious studies. Further, girls take two more subjects of their choice, and in year 11 are given the option to take GCSE-level further mathematics if they desire.

== Results ==
The 2006 A-level results placed the school in fifth place in the performance league table for all maintained schools in the West Midlands.

In 2009, 100% of girls who sat GCSE examinations gained 5 or more A*–C GCSEs.

Since the 2017 GCSE reforms, WGHS has continued to perform highly in subjects. Notably, in 2019, three-quarters of results were a grade 7 to 9, and 87% of students achieved at least a grade 4 in all 5 EBacc subjects.

== Notable former pupils ==
- Lindsay Ashford, author
- Narinder Dhami, author
- Jacqueline Elledge, England cricketer
- Wendy Flavell, professor of surface physics at the University of Manchester
- Helene Hayman, Baroness Hayman, Labour politician, first Lord Speaker of the House of Lords
- Rachael Heyhoe-Flint, captain of the England women's cricket team
- Ann Jago, England cricketer
- Betty Joseph (1917-2013), British psychoanalyst
- Caitlin Moran, author and journalist
- Pauline Perry, Baroness Perry of Southwark, Conservative politician and educationalist
- Patience Wheatcroft, Baroness Wheatcroft, journalist and Conservative peer, former editor of The Sunday Telegraph and Wall Street Journal Europe
- Anne Rafferty, High Court judge
- Sarah Clarke, first woman to be appointed Black Rod in the UK Parliament
- Constance Wood, pioneer of radiotherapy
- Jane Stevenson, Conservative Member of Parliament for Wolverhampton North East and Councillor for Tettenhall Wightwick
