= Daleen Terblanche =

South African cricketer

Personal information
- Full name: Magdalena Terblanche
- Born: 19 October 1969 (age 57); Pretoria, South Africa
- Batting: Right-handed
- Role: Wicket-keeper

International information
- National side: South Africa (1997–2008)
- Test debut (cap 33): 19 March 2002 v India
- Last Test: 28 July 2007 v Netherlands
- ODI debut (cap 11): 5 August 1997 v Ireland
- Last ODI: 14 August 2008 v England
- T20I debut (cap 33): 1 August 2008 v Ireland
- Last T20I: 23 August 2008 v England

Domestic team information
- Years: Team
- 1995/96–2008/09: Gauteng

Career statistics
| Competition | WTest | WODI | WT20I | WLA |
|---|---|---|---|---|
| Matches | 4 | 61 | 2 | 108 |
| Runs scored | 186 | 1,256 | 46 | 2,782 |
| Batting average | 26.57 | 23.69 | 23.00 | 30.91 |
| 100s/50s | 0/1 | 1/5 | 0/0 | 2/15 |
| Top score | 83 | 114* | 37 | 114* |
| Balls bowled | 24 | 36 | – | 1,042 |
| Wickets | 0 | 0 | – | 32 |
| Bowling average | – | – | – | 14.96 |
| 5 wickets in innings | 0 | 0 | – | 0 |
| 10 wickets in match | 0 | 0 | – | 0 |
| Best bowling | – | – | – | 4/6 |
| Catches/stumpings | 3/0 | 28/11 | 0/– | 50/21 |
- Source: CricketArchive, 21 February 2021

Magdalena "Daleen" Terblanche (born 19 October 1969) is a South African former cricketer who played as a wicket-keeper and right-handed batter. She appeared in four Test matches, 61 One Day Internationals and two Twenty20 Internationals for South Africa between 1997 and 2008. She was the first South African woman to pass 1,000 runs in One Day Internationals, doing so in a match against West Indies in April 2005, during her 46th innings. She played domestic cricket for Gauteng.

== Career ==
Following South Africa's expulsion from international cricket, South Africa women played their first match for 25 years in August 1997. Playing against Ireland, Terblanche and her ten teammates made their international debuts. After losing the toss, South Africa put on 175 runs, Terblanche hitting 28 from number six. In reply, Ireland were bowled out for just 82, giving South Africa the victory on their return. South Africa went on to win the three-match series 3–0, and went straight into a four-match series against England, which they lost 2–1.

For the 1997 Women's Cricket World Cup, Terblanche continued as wicket-keeper, but was promoted to open the batting alongside Linda Olivier in all but two of the matches. She finished the tournament with 124 runs, second amongst the South Africans only to Olivier. Against Denmark, she shared a 102 run first-wicket partnership with Olivier to help set up a 99 run victory for South Africa.

Three years later in the 2000 Women's Cricket World Cup, Terblanche once again trailed only Olivier in the South African's batting charts, and courtesy of 3 not outs, she had the superior batting average, her 200 runs coming at 40.00. She played a key-role in securing a semi-final berth for South Africa, playing a strong supporting role in a five-wicket victory over England, her 41 runs coming off 117 runs. She hit her maiden half-century in the fourth group match, played against Sri Lanka, remaining not out as the team won by six wickets.

After defeat in the World Cup semi-final, South Africa didn't play another international match for over a year, when they hosted India. Following the retirement of Olivier, South Africa struggled to score runs, with Terblanche managing just 64 in her four innings. Despite this, South Africa won the one day series 2–1, and then played their first Test match since 1972. In a four-day match, Terblanche scored 25 & 2 as South Africa chased 404, eventually losing by 10 wickets.
