= Lorna Ward =

South African cricketer

Personal information
- Full name: Lorna Grace Ward
- Born: 3 June 1939 (age 87); Port Elizabeth, South Africa
- Batting: Right-handed
- Bowling: Right-arm fast
- Role: Bowler

International information
- National side: South Africa (1960–1972)
- Test debut (cap 11): 2 December 1960 v England
- Last Test: 24 March 1972 v New Zealand

Domestic team information
- Years: Team
- 1958/59–1964/65: Natal
- 1971/72–1974/75: Southern Transvaal

Career statistics
Competition	WTest
Matches	7
Runs scored	52
Batting average	5.77
100s/50s	0/0
Top score	17*
Balls bowled	1,420
Wickets	27
Bowling average	17.29
5 wickets in innings	3
10 wickets in match	0
Best bowling	6/48
Catches/stumpings	1/–
- Source: CricketArchive, 6 March 2022

Lorna Grace Ward (born 3 June 1939) is a South African former cricketer who played as a right-arm pace bowler. She appeared in seven Test matches for South Africa between 1960 and 1972, taking 27 wickets including three five-wicket hauls. She is South Africa's leading wicket-taker in women's Test cricket. She played domestic cricket for Natal and Southern Transvaal.

== Test career ==
=== England 1960–61 ===
Playing in South Africa's first Test against the touring English side, Ward was the third South African to be run out in the first-innings as they posted a total of 211. Bowling in the reply, Ward took four wickets in the first innings to help restrict the English to 187 runs, giving South Africa a small first-innings lead. In a second innings in which South Africa captain Sheelagh Nefdt was criticised for not declaring earlier, Ward made 17 runs in support of her captain as they added an unbeaten 52 for the ninth-wicket. Ward was wicket-less in the fourth innings as England chased 284, the match eventually finishing in a draw with another 83 runs or 6 wickets required for a result.

Ward had minimal involvement in the second Test; she only bowled two overs, taking no wickets and conceding seven runs, and as South Africa were forced to follow-on, she scored a duck in the first-innings and was 0* when the match finished in a draw in South Africa's second-innings. She was again wicket-less in the third Test, conceding 74 runs in her 26 overs in the first-innings. South Africa lost the match by eight wickets and, having been promoted to number nine, Ward only made seven runs in the two innings.

The fourth Test saw Ward take a remarkable five-wicket haul in the first-innings. All five of her wickets were bowled as she finished the innings with 5/18. She failed to take a wicket in the second-innings, bowling expensively for her 18 overs, conceding 44 runs as England set a total of 194 for South Africa to win. In reply, South Africa managed a fast 126 from their 37 overs, but could not prevent the draw.

=== Netherlands 1968–69 ===
Ward was named as part of the squad to play the unofficial Test matches against the Netherlands when England failed to fulfil their fixtures. South Africa won all three Tests, and Ward claimed figures of 3/26 in the first-innings of the third Test followed by 4/36 in the second-innings.

=== New Zealand 1971–72 ===
One of only three survivors from the squad that faced the touring English side in 1960–61, Ward appeared in all three Tests against New Zealand eleven years later. She started the series well, taking five wickets in New Zealand's first-innings. She fell for another duck in the Springboks first-innings and didn't take a wicket in the second-innings as the match finished a draw.

The South Africans bowled well in the first-innings of the second Test, with Ward, Gloria Williamson and Denise Weyers taking three wickets apiece to restrict the Kiwis to 168. In reply, South Africa could only manage 111, and in spite of another three wickets from Ward, taking an economical 3/38 in her 28 overs, New Zealand declared 277 ahead. South Africa were bowled out for 89 and lost the match.

In her final Test, Ward achieved her best bowling performance, taking six wickets in the Kiwi's first-innings as they posted a lead of 98 runs. As South Africa managed 242 in the second-innings, New Zealand returned to bat needing 148 runs to win. Ward took 1/28 as the Kiwis finished just 31 runs short of their target.
