= Carole Gildenhuys =

South African cricketer (born 1943)

Personal information
- Full name: Carole Anne Gildenhuys
- Born: 19 November 1943 (age 82); Port Elizabeth, South Africa
- Role: Wicket-keeper

International information
- National side: South Africa (1972)
- Test debut (cap 17): 25 February 1972 v New Zealand
- Last Test: 24 March 1972 v New Zealand

Domestic team information
- Years: Team
- 1971/72–1972/73: Southern Transvaal

Career statistics
Competition	WTest
Matches	3
Runs scored	184
Batting average	30.66
100s/50s	0/2
Top score	94
Catches/stumpings	9/0
- Source: CricketArchive, 5 March 2022

Carole Anne Gildenhuys (born 19 November 1943) is a South African former cricketer who played as a wicket-keeper. She appeared in three Test matches for South Africa in 1972, all against New Zealand, scoring 184 runs with a high score of 94. She played domestic cricket for Southern Transvaal.
