= Roger Prideaux =

English cricketer

Personal information
- Full name: Roger Malcolm Prideaux
- Born: 31 July 1939 (age 87); Chelsea, London
- Batting: Right-handed
- Bowling: Right-arm medium
- Relatives: Ruth Westbrook (spouse)

International information
- National side: England
- Test debut: 25 July 1968 v Australia
- Last Test: 28 February 1969 v Pakistan

Career statistics
Competition	Test	First-class
Matches	3	446
Runs scored	102	25,136
Batting average	20.39	34.29
100s/50s	0/1	41/130
Top score	64	202*
Balls bowled	12	333
Wickets	–	3
Bowling average	–	58.66
5 wickets in innings	–	0
10 wickets in match	–	0
Best bowling	–	2/13
Catches/stumpings	0/–	301/–
- Source: CricInfo, 4 June 2020

Roger Malcolm Prideaux (born 31 July 1939) is an English former cricketer, who played in three Tests for England from 1968 to 1969.

== Life and career ==
Prideaux was educated at Tonbridge School and Sidney Sussex College, Cambridge. A talented, stroke playing opening batsman, he won blues at Cambridge University from 1958 to 1960, and began his first-class cricket career at Kent. Moving to Northants, he scored a thousand runs in his first season, formed a powerful opening combination with the pugnacious Colin Milburn and captained the county from 1967 to 1970. He marked his Test debut in 1968, against Australia at Headingley with a 64, but missed the final Test of the series, at the Oval, with pleurisy. His absence allowed the selection of Basil D'Oliveira, and the subsequent controversy led to the abandonment of the 1968/9 tour to South Africa, for which Prideaux had been selected. He played in two Tests on tour against Pakistan, but was dropped thereafter.

In 1967, Prideaux was elected as the first chairman of the fledgling Professional Cricketers' Association. Prideaux ended his long career at Sussex, batting in the middle order. He also played for Orange Free State in the early 1970s, and later emigrated to South Africa.

His former wife Ruth (1930–2016) (née Westbrook) was also involved in international cricket, managing and coaching the England women's cricket team. Under her maiden name, she had earlier played eleven Tests between 1957 and 1963. They are one of the few married couples who have both played Test cricket.
