= Helen Sharpe =

English cricketer

Personal information
- Full name: Helen Margaret Sharpe
- Born: 23 February 1927; Huddersfield, Yorkshire, England
- Died: 7 December 1996 (aged 69)
- Role: Batter

International information
- National side: England (1957–1961)
- Test debut (cap 49): 27 December 1957 v New Zealand
- Last Test: 13 January 1961 v South Africa

Domestic team information
- Years: Team
- 1947–1949: Yorkshire
- 1951–1963: Middlesex

Career statistics
Competition	WTest	WFC
Matches	5	19
Runs scored	296	497
Batting average	37.00	21.60
100s/50s	1/1	1/2
Top score	126	126
Balls bowled	54	63
Wickets	0	1
Bowling average	–	34.00
5 wickets in innings	0	0
10 wickets in match	0	0
Best bowling	–	1/10
Catches/stumpings	1/1	21/12
- Source: CricketArchive, 7 March 2021

Helen Margaret Sharpe (23 February 1927 – 7 December 1996) was an English cricketer who played as a batter and occasional wicket-keeper. She made her Test debut against New Zealand in December 1957. She appeared in five Test matches for England between 1957 and 1961, and captained them on their tour of South Africa in 1960/61. She played domestic cricket for Yorkshire and Middlesex.
