= Alison Hodgkinson =

South African cricketer (born 1977)

Personal information
- Full name: Alison Lucille Hodgkinson
- Born: 30 January 1977 (age 49); East London, Cape Province, South Africa
- Batting: Right-handed
- Bowling: Right-arm leg break
- Role: Batter

International information
- National side: South Africa (2000–2012)
- Test debut (cap 29): 19 March 2002 v India
- Last Test: 20 August 2003 v England
- ODI debut (cap 24): 20 June 2000 v England
- Last ODI: 9 September 2012 v Bangladesh
- T20I debut (cap 26): 27 October 2011 v England
- Last T20I: 3 October 2012 v Pakistan

Domestic team information
- Years: Team
- 2003/04–2006/07: Western Province
- 2007/08–2014/15: Boland

Career statistics
Competition	WTest	WODI	WT20I	WLA
Matches	3	38	8	144
Runs scored	239	598	161	4,030
Batting average	39.83	18.12	23.00	35.04
100s/50s	0/2	0/2	0/1	5/22
Top score	95	71	51	183*
Balls bowled	–	114	–	216
Wickets	–	1	–	6
Bowling average	–	59.00	–	23.16
5 wickets in innings	–	0	–	0
10 wickets in match	–	0	–	0
Best bowling	–	1/18	–	2/12
Catches/stumpings	3/–	11/–	0/–	46/–
- Source: CricketArchive, 28 April 2021

Alison Lucille Hodgkinson (born 30 January 1977) is a South African former cricketer who played as a right-handed batter. She appeared in 3 Test matches, 38 One Day Internationals and 8 Twenty20 Internationals for South Africa between 2000 and 2012, and captained the side between 2003 and 2005. She played domestic cricket for Western Province and Boland.
