= Eileen Hurly =

South African cricketer (born 1932)

Eileen Mary Ann Hurly
Personal information
- Full name: Eileen Hurly
- Born: 6 May 1932 (age 94); Benoni, Transvaal, South Africa
- Role: Batter

International information
- National side: South Africa (1960–1961)
- Test debut (cap 4): 2 December 1960 v England
- Last Test: 13 January 1961 v England

Domestic team information
- Years: Team
- 1953/54–1971/72: Southern Transvaal

Career statistics
Competition	WTest
Matches	4
Runs scored	240
Batting average	34.28
100s/50s	0/1
Top score	96*
Balls bowled	6
Wickets	0
Bowling average	–
5 wickets in innings	0
10 wickets in match	0
Best bowling	–
Catches/stumpings	0/–
- Source: CricketArchive, 6 March 2022

Eileen Mary Ann Hurly (born 6 May 1932) is a South African former cricketer who played as a batter. She appeared in four Test matches for South Africa between 1960 and 1961, all against England, scoring 240 runs including a top-score of 96* in her first Test. She was particularly strong playing the square cut. She played domestic cricket for Southern Transvaal.

== Career ==
Born to James William, Eileen Hurly attended the Dominican Convent in Benoni. During her first league match in 1947, aged only 13, she hit the first recorded century in women's cricket in South Africa. She made her provincial debut for Southern Transvaal later that year. She continued to set records, and in 1953/54, she made the first recorded inter-provincial century, scoring 106*.

During the English tour of South Africa, Hurly was South Africa's most prolific run-scorer, consistently out-scoring her teammates. In each of the first three Tests of the series she top-scored for South Africa in the first-innings, posting scores of 37 and 29 after narrowly missing out on a century in the opening match.

In 1968–69 South Africa were due to play England again, but at the last minute the English were unable to fulfil the fixtures and a Dutch women's cricket team toured South Africa instead. Hurly was named captain of the South African squad for this tour, which South Africa whitewashed. During this series, Hurly was involved in a 124 run partnership with Jennifer Gove made in under an hour.

By the end of her playing career, Hurly had made over 100 appearances provincially, served on the Transvaal executive committee and the South African and Rhodesian Women's Cricket Association.
