= Denise Weyers =

South African cricketer

Personal information
- Full name: Denise Weyers
- Born: 1942; Cape Town, South Africa
- Died: 6 May 2022 (aged 79–80)
- Role: All-rounder

International information
- National side: South Africa (1972)
- Test debut (cap 22): 25 February 1972 v New Zealand
- Last Test: 24 March 1972 v New Zealand

Domestic team information
- Years: Team
- 1968/69–1978/79: Western Province

Career statistics
Competition	WTest
Matches	3
Runs scored	6
Batting average	1.50
100s/50s	0/0
Top score	5
Balls bowled	660
Wickets	5
Bowling average	40.80
5 wickets in innings	0
10 wickets in match	0
Best bowling	3/33
Catches/stumpings	3/–
- Source: CricketArchive, 2 March 2022

Denise Weyers (1942 – 6 May 2022) was a South African cricketer who played as an all-rounder. She appeared in three Test matches for South Africa in 1972, all against New Zealand, scoring six runs and taking five wickets. She played domestic cricket for Western Province.
