= Simon Trophy =

- Administrator: SA & Rhodesian Women's Cricket Association
- First edition: 1951–52
- Tournament format: League system

The Simon Trophy was a South African women's cricket club cup trophy, awarded annually to the Annual Inter Provincial Tournament champions. The trophy was presented to the Southern Transvaal Association by Tilly Mary Simon to hand over to the South African Association upon its formation. It was first awarded in the 1950–51 season.

== Past winners (incomplete) ==
Year	Champions
1952	Western Province (1)
1953	Western Province (2)
1954	Western Province (3)
1955	Southern Transvaal (1)
1956	Natal (1)
1957	Eastern Province (1)
1958	Southern Transvaal (2)
1959	Southern Transvaal (3)
1960	Natal (2)
1961	Not presented in view of the English tour
1962	Southern Transvaal (4)
1963	Eastern Province (2)
1964	Natal (3)
1965	Natal (4)
1966	Southern Transvaal (5)
1967	Natal (5)
1968	Southern Transvaal (6)
1969	Southern Transvaal (7)
1970	Southern Transvaal (8)
