= Mollie Hunt =

English cricketer (1936–2018)

Personal information
- Full name: Mollie Elaine Hunt
- Born: 29 July 1936; Leeds, Yorkshire, England
- Died: 2 February 2018 (aged 81); Harpenden, Hertfordshire, England
- Batting: Right-handed
- Bowling: Right-arm off break
- Role: All-rounder

International information
- National side: England (1960–1961)
- Test debut (cap 52): 2 December 1960 v South Africa
- Last Test: 13 January 1961 v South Africa

Domestic team information
- Years: Team
- 1953: Yorkshire
- 1956–1973: Kent

Career statistics
Competition	WTest	WFC
Matches	3	5
Runs scored	35	39
Batting average	11.66	6.50
100s/50s	0/0	0/0
Top score	29	29
Balls bowled	228	228
Wickets	1	1
Bowling average	124.00	124.00
5 wickets in innings	0	0
10 wickets in match	0	0
Best bowling	1/31	1/31
Catches/stumpings	0/–	2/–
- Source: CricketArchive, 7 March 2021

Mollie Elaine Hunt (29 July 1936 – 2 March 2018) was an English cricketer who played as a right-handed batter and right-arm off break bowler. She appeared in 3 Test matches for England in 1960 and 1961, all against South Africa. She mainly played domestic cricket for Kent.

1960 -1962 she was Kent WCA Fixtures Secretary.

1963 - 1965 she moved to Trinidad W.I. And was a member of a committee responsible for the formation of The Northern Trinidad WCA which was the first steps towards a national team.

1965 - 1973 Mollie Hunt returned to Kent. During that time she played Kent 1st XI, was Kent WCA Secretary, then Kent WCA Chairman. She also introduced cricket into all the girls schools in Orpington, Kent.

During that time she was also Vice Chair Women’s Cricket Association, Vice Chair International Women’s Cricket Council and earned the Advance Cricket Coaches Award (one of the first 12)

In 1973 Mollie stopped playing cricket and moved to Hertfordshire. She became selector for Kent, Middlesex & East Anglia, she coached in Holland and for Young England. She was also Senior Coach at the first Centre of Excellence for Women’s Cricket.

In 2000 she was involved in organising annual reunions and served on the committee and in 2009 took an interest in the archives of the WCA. The first step in this venture was to produce a leaflet containing the ‘sign post dates’ in the development of Women’s Cricket. No individual names are mentioned because for every player who reached the heights of the game, there were many others working ‘unsung’ for the WCA and who made its success possible.

In 2011 Mollie was involved as Chair of a committee that was set up to work with a website company to preserve the detailed archives of the Women’s Cricket Association 1926-1998.
