= Anne Sanders =

English cricketer (born 1931)

Personal information
- Full name: Elizabeth Anne Sanders
- Born: 20 July 1931 (age 95); Chelsea, Middlesex, England
- Batting: Right-handed
- Bowling: Right-arm off break
- Role: Bowler

International information
- National side: England (1954–1969)
- Test debut (cap 41): 3 July 1954 v New Zealand
- Last Test: 15 February 1969 v New Zealand

Domestic team information
- Years: Team
- 1949–1974: Middlesex

Career statistics
Competition	WTest	WFC
Matches	11	34
Runs scored	150	600
Batting average	13.63	15.78
100s/50s	0/0	0/1
Top score	40*	51
Balls bowled	2,123	4,860
Wickets	32	75
Bowling average	16.62	19.50
5 wickets in innings	0	0
10 wickets in match	0	0
Best bowling	4/29	4/29
Catches/stumpings	12/–	16/–
- Source: CricketArchive, 9 March 2021

Elizabeth Anne Sanders (born 20 July 1931) is an English former cricketer who played primarily as a right-arm off break bowler. She appeared in 11 Test matches for England between 1954 and 1969. She played domestic cricket for Middlesex.
