= Kathleen Smith (cricketer) =

English cricketer (1927–1998)

Personal information
- Full name: Kathleen Smith
- Born: 27 April 1927; Ecclesall Bierlow, Yorkshire, England
- Died: March 1998 (aged 70); Meopham, Kent, England
- Role: Batter

International information
- National side: England (1960)
- Only Test (cap 57): 2 December 1960 v South Africa

Domestic team information
- Years: Team
- 1952–1962: Kent

Career statistics
Competition	WTest
Matches	1
Runs scored	30
Batting average	15.00
100s/50s	0/0
Top score	29
Catches/stumpings	0/–
- Source: CricketArchive, 6 March 2021

Kathleen Smith (27 April 1927 – March 1998) was an English cricketer who played as a batter. She appeared in one Test match for England in 1960, against South Africa. She played domestic cricket for Kent. Smith died in Meopham, Kent in March 1998, at the age of 70.
