= Eleanor Lambert (cricketer) =

South African cricketer

Personal information
- Died: 1994; South Africa
- Role: Wicket-keeper

International information
- National side: South Africa (1960–1961)
- Test debut (cap 7): 2 December 1960 v England
- Last Test: 17 December 1960 v England

Domestic team information
- Years: Team
- 1954/55–1960/61: Natal

Career statistics
Competition	WTest
Matches	2
Runs scored	65
Batting average	16.25
100s/50s	0/0
Top score	34
Catches/stumpings	1/0
- Source: CricketArchive, 5 March 2022

Eleanor Lambert (died 1994) was a South African cricketer who played as a wicket-keeper. She appeared in two Test matches for South Africa in 1960 and 1961, both against England. Opening the batting, she scored 12 runs in the first innings of the first Test, and scored 34 in the second innings as South Africa drew the match. Opening again in the second Test, she could only manage 2 runs in the first-innings, and with South Africa following on, 17 runs in the second. She did not appear in the last two Tests of the series, and was not to play for South Africa again. She played domestic cricket for Natal.
