= Maureen Payne =

South African cricketer

Personal information
- Full name: Maureen Payne
- Died: 1997; South Africa
- Bowling: Slow left-arm orthodox
- Role: Bowler

International information
- National side: South Africa (1960–1972)
- Test debut (cap 13): 17 December 1960 v England
- Last Test: 24 March 1972 v New Zealand

Domestic team information
- Years: Team
- 1958/59–1974/75: Western Province

Career statistics
Competition	WTest
Matches	5
Runs scored	39
Batting average	9.75
100s/50s	0/0
Top score	33
Balls bowled	814
Wickets	8
Bowling average	40.50
5 wickets in innings	0
10 wickets in match	0
Best bowling	2/31
Catches/stumpings	2/–
- Source: CricketArchive, 2 March 2022

Maureen Payne was a South African cricketer who played as a slow left-arm orthodox bowler. She appeared in five Test matches for South Africa between 1960 and 1972, including captaining the side in their series against New Zealand. She played domestic cricket for Western Province.
