= Gloria Williamson (cricketer) =

South African cricketer (born 1938)

Personal information
- Full name: Gloria Williamson
- Born: 7 December 1938 (age 87); Roodepoort, Johannesburg, South Africa
- Bowling: Right-arm medium
- Role: Bowler

International information
- National side: South Africa (1972)
- Test debut (cap 23): 25 February 1972 v New Zealand
- Last Test: 24 March 1972 v New Zealand

Domestic team information
- Years: Team
- 1964/65–1983/84: Southern Transvaal

Career statistics
Competition	WTest
Matches	3
Runs scored	14
Batting average	4.66
100s/50s	0/0
Top score	9
Balls bowled	686
Wickets	12
Bowling average	18.41
5 wickets in innings	0
10 wickets in match	0
Best bowling	3/28
Catches/stumpings	2/–
- Source: CricketArchive, 5 March 2022

Gloria Williamson (born 7 December 1938) is a South African former cricketer who played as a right-arm medium bowler. She appeared in three Test matches for South Africa in 1972, all against New Zealand, taking 12 wickets. She played domestic cricket for Southern Transvaal.
