= Netta Rheinberg =

English cricketer, administrator, and journalist

Personal information
- Full name: Netta Rheinberg
- Born: 24 October 1911; Willesden, Middlesex, England
- Died: 18 June 2006 (aged 94); Hertfordshire, England
- Role: Batter

International information
- National side: England (1949)
- Only Test (cap 25): 15 January 1949 v Australia

Domestic team information
- Years: Team
- 1937–1951: Middlesex

Career statistics
Competition	WTest	WFC
Matches	1	4
Runs scored	0	80
Batting average	0.00	13.33
100s/50s	0/0	0/1
Top score	0	51
Catches/stumpings	0/–	1/–
- Source: CricketArchive, 10 March 2021

Netta Rheinberg MBE (24 October 1911 – 18 June 2006) was an English cricketer, journalist and administrator. She appeared in one Test match for England in 1949, against Australia. She played domestic cricket for Middlesex.

== Early life and education ==
Rheinberg was born in Brondesbury in London. Her father was a businessman and inventor, Julius Rheinberg. Netta attended South Hampstead High School, studied languages abroad, and then went to secretarial college.

== Career ==
Rheinberg started her career as temporary secretary at Stowe School, moved to a hearing aid company, and from there to her parents' textile business.

== Cricket ==
Rheinberg's single Test match came on England's tour of Australia in 1948/49. She was the team's manager, and had to play in the match because of injuries to other players. She made a "pair", becoming the first woman to do so on Test debut.

She was the manager of the 1957-58 tour of Australia and New Zealand, and commented that each woman on the team had to raise £400 for their costs. "Some sawed and sold logs, others packed chocolates and sold jam jars."

Rheinberg was most notable in the women's game as an administrator and journalist. Rachael Heyhoe-Flint, the former England captain, said of her work as an administrator, "Netta was an action girl. We had very few people then, and she galvanised activity, partly just by having a great personality and a sense of humour."

"For a north London Jew, playing cricket for England and being one of the game’s most important administrators is about as well-trodden a career path as prime minister or bacon-buttie salesman," wrote Rob Steen shortly after her death aged 94 in 2006. "That Rheinberg happened to be a woman made her accomplishments all the more admirable."

She was secretary of the Women's Cricket Association in 1945 and from 1948 to 1958. She was also membership secretary and vice-chairman of the Cricket Society. She edited the magazine Women's Cricket, reported on women's cricket for Wisden for more than thirty years, and wrote a regular column for The Cricketer.

With Heyhoe-Flint as co-author, Rheinberg wrote a history of the women's game, Fair Play - the story of women's cricket, Angus & Robertson, 1976.

In 1999 she was one of the first ten women to be awarded honorary membership of MCC.
