= Ruth Westbrook =

English cricketer (1930-2016)

Ruth Prideaux
Personal information
- Full name: Ruth Emily Prideaux
- Born: 12 July 1930; Greenhithe, Kent, England
- Died: 7 April 2016 (aged 85); Eastbourne
- Batting: Right-handed
- Role: Wicket-keeper
- Relatives: Roger Prideaux (husband)

International information
- National side: England (1957–1963)
- Test debut (cap 46): 29 November 1957 v New Zealand
- Last Test: 20 July 1963 v Australia

Domestic team information
- Years: Team
- 1953–1958: Yorkshire
- 1959–1964: Kent

Career statistics
Competition	WTest	WFC
Matches	11	33
Runs scored	476	1,073
Batting average	31.73	29.80
100s/50s	0/3	0/6
Top score	87	88
Catches/stumpings	13/9	28/20
- Source: CricketArchive, 7 March 2021

Ruth Emily Prideaux (née Westbrook; 12 July 1930 – 7 April 2016) was an English cricketer who played as a wicket-keeper. She appeared in 11 Test matches for England between 1957 and 1963. She was also England's first full-time head coach, and was in the role from 1988 to 1993, retiring after the side won the 1993 World Cup. She played domestic cricket for Yorkshire and Kent.

== Personal life ==
Prideaux's husband, Roger, also played Test cricket for England.
