= Yvonne van Mentz =

South African cricketer

Personal information
- Full name: Yvonne van Mentz
- Role: All-rounder

International information
- National side: South Africa (1960–1961)
- Test debut (cap 10): 2 December 1960 v England
- Last Test: 13 January 1961 v England

Domestic team information
- Years: Team
- 1957/58–1960/61: Southern Transvaal
- 1962/63–1964/65: Natal

Career statistics
Competition	WTest
Matches	4
Runs scored	186
Batting average	31.00
100s/50s	1/0
Top score	105*
Balls bowled	565
Wickets	8
Bowling average	31.25
5 wickets in innings	0
10 wickets in match	0
Best bowling	4/95
Catches/stumpings	0/–
- Source: CricketArchive, 5 March 2022

Yvonne van Mentz is a South African former cricketer who played as an all-rounder. She appeared in four Test matches for South Africa in 1960 and 1961, all against England. She scored South African's first century in Women's Test cricket, with 105* in the fourth Test of the series. She played domestic cricket for Southern Transvaal and Natal.

== Career ==
All of van Mentz's appearances for South Africa occurred during the England women's cricket team tour of South Africa in 1960–61. She first faced England during a warm-up match for the touring side, appearing for Southern Transvaal. Batting as part of the top order, she top-scored for her side, scoring nine fours as part of her 68 runs. She also opened the bowling for Southern Transvaal, but bowled for 15 overs without taking a wicket. In the first Test against England, she batted at number seven, and made scores of 11 and 15 in the two innings. She also claimed three wickets in the match. After playing for a South African XI against England without making a significant impact, van Mentz was South Africa's leading wicket-taker in the second Test, taking four wickets as England declared their innings closed on 351 for 6. She then scored 17 and 11 in each innings as South Africa were forced to follow on, eventually forcing a draw. She had little impact in the third Test, making scores of three in both innings, and taking no wickets. In the fourth Test, van Mentz scored South Africa's first century in women's Test cricket, remaining 105 not out when South Africa declared on 266 for 8. The match eventually concluded as a draw. Her score is the highest of just two centuries by South African women in Test cricket, the other being a total of exactly 100 by Brenda Williams. She still holds the record for the highest Test score by any woman cricketer when batting at number 6 (105*), and she was the first female cricketer to score a Test century when batting at number 6 or lower in Women's Test history.
