= South Africa women's national cricket team =

South African women's sports team

South Africa
- South Africa cricket crest
- Nickname: Proteas
- Association: Cricket South Africa

Personnel
- Captain: Laura Wolvaardt
- Coach: Mandla Mashimbyi

International Cricket Council
- ICC status: Full member (1909)
- ICC region: Africa
ICC Rankings	Current	Best-ever
ODI	4th	2nd (18 March 2021)
T20I	5th	5th

Tests
- First Test: v England at St George's Park Cricket Ground, Port Elizabeth; 2–5 December 1960
- Last Test: v England at Mangaung Oval, Bloemfontein; 15–17 December 2024
Tests	Played	Won/Lost
Total	16	1/8 (7 draws)

One Day Internationals
- First ODI: v Ireland at Stormont, Belfast; 5 August 1997
- Last ODI: v New Zealand at Basin Reserve, Wellington; 4 April 2026
ODIs	Played	Won/Lost
Total	276	144/116 (5 ties, 11 no results)
- World Cup appearances: 8 (first in 1997)
- Best result: Runners-up (2025)

T20 Internationals
- First T20I: v New Zealand at County Ground, Taunton; 10 August 2007
- Last T20I: v Zimbabwe at Queens Sports Club, Bulawayo; 19 September 2026
T20Is	Played	Won/Lost
Total	199	93/99 (0 ties, 7 no results)
- T20 World Cup appearances: 10 (first in 2009)
- Best result: Runners-up (2023, 2024)
Test kit
ODI kit
T20I kit
- As of 19 September 2026

The South Africa women's national cricket team, nicknamed the Proteas, represents South Africa in international women's cricket. One of eight teams competing in the ICC Women's Championship (the highest level of the sport), the team is organised by Cricket South Africa (CSA), a full member of the International Cricket Council (ICC).

South Africa made its Test debut in 1960, against England, becoming the fourth team to play at that level (after Australia, England, and New Zealand). Because of the sporting boycott of South Africa and other factors, the team did not play any international fixtures between 1972 and 1997. South Africa returned to international competition in August 1997, in a One Day International (ODI) match against Ireland, and later in the year participated in the 1997 Women's Cricket World Cup in India. The team has participated in every edition of the Women's Cricket World Cup since then, and made the tournament semi-finals in 2000 and 2017. South Africa has likewise participated in every edition of the Women's T20 World Cup, and reached the finals twice in 2023 and 2024, but ended up by losing both times to Australia and New Zealand respectively.

== History ==
=== Early history ===
The first report of women's cricket in South Africa is from 1888, when Harry Cadwallader, later the first secretary of South Africa Cricket Association, observed "a number of the fair sex indulging in practice... and they showed they are possessed of not inconsiderable talent...". The following year, students from the South African College played against 'a team of ladies', with the male students forced to bat, bowl and field left-handed, and bat using pick-handles. The women won the match by an innings. There are other references to similar conditions being placed on male competitors in matches against women at the time, a tradition carried over from England. Women's cricket was played in South Africa fairly regularly throughout the beginning of the 20th century, and in 1922, Winfred Kingswell set-up, and became the first president of, the Peninsula Girls' School Games Union. Ten years later, she helped found the Peninsula Ladies Cricket Club (PLCC), which with 30 members, played regular matches against men's sides on level terms. They played 33 matches in two seasons with limited success, winning nine of them. In 1934, the PLCC affiliated to the Women's Cricket Association in England, which governed international cricket at the time. The intention was to organise women's cricket in South Africa, and eventually send teams to play in England, Scotland and Australia. Little progress was reported, although regular women's cricket continued until the Second World War. It was revived in 1947 by a group of enthusiasts, and in 1951 Netta Rheinberg, on behalf of the Women's Cricket Association, suggested that a South Africa Women's Cricket Association be formed, and encouraged the possibility that a series of matches could be played between the two associations. The South African & Rhodesian Women's Cricket Association (SA&RWCA) was officially formed in 1952. At their annual general meeting in January 1955, the SA&RWCA accepted an invitation from the Women's Cricket Association to join an International Women's Cricket Council that, in addition to South Africa, included England, Australia and New Zealand. They also agreed that international matches would be played between the four nations. In 1959, arrangements were made for the first international women's cricket tour of South Africa, as they would play host to the English team in 1960.

=== First international women's tours of South Africa ===
The touring English side played nine tour matches in addition to the scheduled four Test matches, beginning with a one-day contest against a Western Province Combined XI. South Africa began their first women's Test match on 2 December 1960 at St George's Oval, Port Elizabeth — the same venue as used for the first men's Test match in the country in 1889 — and ended in a draw. After another draw in the second Test, England claimed victory in the third by eight wickets, and a draw in the final Test gave the touring side a 1–0 series victory. The series saw South Africa become the fourth women's Test playing nation, after England and Australia who contested the first ever women's Test match in 1934, and New Zealand who played their first women's Test in 1935.

Due to South African apartheid laws, which introduced legal racial segregation to the country in 1948, no non-white (defined under the legislation as either "black", "coloured" or "Indian") player was eligible to play Test cricket for South Africa. In fact, overseas teams wishing to tour South Africa were also limited by these rules. These laws led to Basil D'Oliveira, a 'Cape Coloured' South African emigrating to England, where he began to play Test cricket. He was subsequently named as a late replacement as part of the England team to tour South African in 1968–69, but South African Prime Minister John Vorster refused to allow D'Oliveira into the country as part of the touring side, declaring: "We are not prepared to receive a team thrust upon us by people whose interests are not in the game but to gain certain political objectives which they do not even attempt to hide. The MCC team is not the team of the MCC but of the anti-apartheid movement." A week later, the Marylebone Cricket Club (MCC) called off the tour. South Africa's cricket team toured Australia the following winter, but a tour of England in 1970, and of Australia in 1971–72 were both cancelled after anti-apartheid protests. Despite this growing sporting isolation, a New Zealand women's team toured South Africa in the 1971–72 season. Only three members of the 1960 South Africa team returned to compete against New Zealand: Jennifer Gove, Lorna Ward and Maureen Payne. New Zealand played six tour matches and three Test matches in a tour lasting just over a month spanning February and March 1972. New Zealand won the series 1–0, with both the first and the last Tests being drawn.

=== Exclusion from international cricket ===
Although the D'Oliveira affair had drawn international condemnation, cricket administrators in England and Australia were reluctant to sever their playing links with South Africa. Other international sports had already cut their ties with the country, exclusion from the 1964 and 1968 Olympics were followed by expulsion from the Olympic Movement in 1970. Later in the same year South African athletes were suspended from international competition by the International Amateur Athletics Federation. The invitation for the South African men's tour of England was initially maintained, but threats of physical disruption to matches from anti-apartheid militants saw the British government step-in to cancel the tour. In May 1970, the Cricket Council made the decision that there should be no further tours to and from South Africa until cricket within the country was played on a multi-racial basis, and the national team was selected purely on merit. In 1976, three different organisations; the South Africa Cricket Association (SACA), South African Board of Cricket Control (SACBOC) and the South African African Cricket Board (SAACB) agreed to establish one single board to govern South African cricket, and that all future cricket in the country would be played on an integrated basis regardless of race or colour. The new governing body; the South African Cricket Union formally took over the running of cricket in the republic in September 1977. However, a group within the SACBOC did not recognise this body, and set up a rival organisation, the South African Cricket Board, led by Hassan Howa, who claimed that there could be "no normal sport in an abnormal society". The International Cricket Conference (ICC) imposed a moratorium on tours in 1970. Despite the official boycott, cricket tours of South Africa did continue. Derrick Robins took teams in 1973, 1974 and 1975, while an 'International Wanderers' side also toured in 1976.

In 1977, heads of state of the Commonwealth of Nations met to discuss the situation with apartheid in South Africa and the consequences of maintaining sporting ties with the country. They unanimously adopted the Gleneagles Agreement, which discouraged sporting contact and competition with organisations, teams and individuals from South Africa. This agreement temporarily stopped cricketing tours of South Africa. However, in 1982 the first of the rebel tours began. Geoffrey Boycott and Graham Gooch lead an English XI in a month-long tour of three 'Test' matches and three 'One Day Internationals'. The reaction in England and South Africa was severely polarised. The English press and politicians alike were outraged; dubbing the touring part the 'Dirty Dozen'. In South Africa, it was heralded by the government and white press as the return of international cricket. The English rebels all received three-year bans from international cricket. Sri Lanka toured during the following South African summer, and were followed by a team from the West Indies, who justified their actions by claiming they were showing white South Africa that black men were their equals. However, they received life-bans from Caribbean cricket in 1983, and were ostracised in their own countries. An Australian XI, led by former Test captain Kim Hughes toured twice in 1985/86 and 1986/87, while a second English XI, this time led by Mike Gatting represented the final rebel tour in 1990. There were some women's rebel tours from England, although these attracted much less interest than those in the men's game. Kim Price, who captained South African women between 1997 and 2000 following their return to international cricket, made her first appearances in the mid-1980s against these rebel teams.

=== Return to international cricket ===
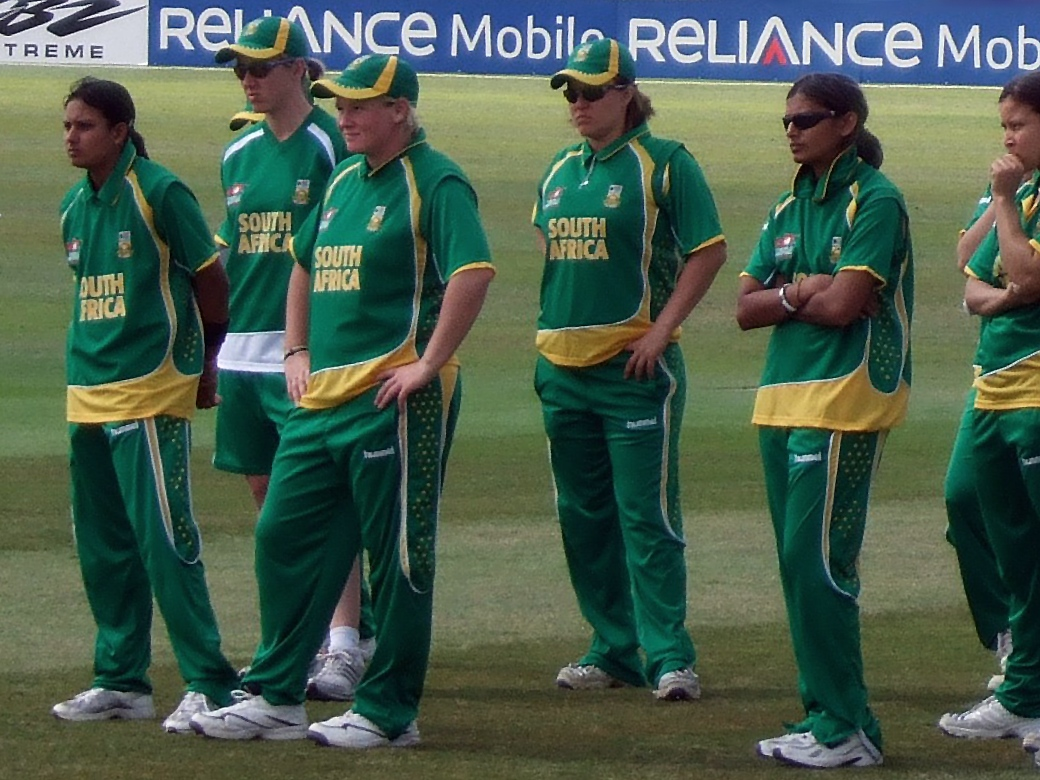
South Africa women at Taunton, 2009 ICC Women's World Twenty20

In June 1991, the South African Cricket Union and the South African Cricket Board merged to form the United Cricket Board of South Africa (UCB). The unification ended enforced racial separation, and only a month later, on 10 July 1991, South Africa was re-admitted as a full member of the ICC. South Africa's men played their first match since their enforced absence in November 1991, a One Day International against India. Just under six years later, and twenty five years after their home series against New Zealand, South Africa returned to international women's cricket with a tour of Ireland and England in 1997. In addition to marking their return, the three-match women's One Day International (ODI) series against Ireland also represented South Africa's first taste of ODI cricket, as the first women's ODI had been played in 1973, during their exclusion. Despite their inexperience in the format, and the lack of international experience of their players—none of the team from the 1971–72 series remained—South Africa whitewashed Ireland 3–0. South Africa fared less well as they progressed onto the English segment of their tour. After narrowly beating England Under-23s women in a 50-over warm-up match, they fell to a 79-run loss in the first ODI. They improved in the second ODI to beat the hosts by two wickets, but a seven wicket defeat in the third, followed by rain abandonments in the final two matches saw South Africa lose the series 2–1.

Later in that year, South Africa women competed in their first Women's Cricket World Cup. South Africa qualified from the group stage courtesy of their third-place finish—behind Australia and England—and met hosts India in the quarter-finals. Batting first, South Africa only managed to make 80, with Daleen Terblanche and Cindy Eksteen the sole South Africans to make a double figure score. India reached their target in 28 overs, and progressed to the semi-finals at South Africa's expense.

=== Series losses in Australia, New Zealand and England ===
After a 1998 season without any international cricket for South Africa women, they toured Australia and New Zealand in 1998–99. A three match ODI series against the world champions, Australia, resulted in a 2–0 defeat; the third match was abandoned without a ball being bowled. South Africa struggled to compete in either match, suffering a 92-run loss followed by a 100-run loss. The subsequent series in New Zealand brought further defeat; after losing both 50-over warm-up matches to New Zealand women's 'A' sides, South Africa were whitewashed in the ODI series, only managing scores of 82, 101 and 96 when batting.

South Africa were again on tour in 2000, returning once more to England, this time contesting a five-match ODI series. Two warm-up matches against England women 'A' resulted in a narrow victory followed by a tie, not an auspicious start. However, unlike their previous two ODI series, South Africa managed to win two matches, winning both the third and the fifth ODIs. Despite these victories England won the series 3–2, subjecting South Africa to their fourth straight series defeat.

=== Raising the profile of South African women's cricket ===
The 2000 Women's World Cup saw an improvement in form, as South Africa finished ahead of England in the group stage, courtesy of a five-wicket victory over them. Their finish saw them qualify for the semi-finals, where they were beaten by Australia, who had remained undefeated in the group stage of the competition. The achievement of South Africa's women raised publicity of the sport in their own country, where South African Women's Cricket Association president Colleen Roberts described the exposure of the women's game as "pathetic". Roberts explained that one of the main problems surrounding the promotion of the sport was the lack of teams touring South Africa, due to women's cricket in the country having no sponsor. South Africa did manage to attract a team to tour in 2001–02, with India travelling to the country to contest four ODIs and a Test match. After winning the ODI series 2–1, South Africa were defeated by 10 wickets in their first Test since their readmittance to international cricket.

South Africa then played three consecutive series against England women, touring the country in 2003, and then hosting series in both 2003–04 and 2004–05. The 2003 series saw the two nations compete in two Test matches in addition to three ODIs. After a series of tour matches against county and representative sides in which South Africa mustered only one win in four attempts, the first Test match was drawn. The ODI series was scheduled before the second Test, and South Africa won the second of the limited over contests, but suffered big defeats in both of the matches either side. The tour finished with another heavy loss in the second Test, England winning by an innings and 96 runs as South Africa only managed to score 130 and 229. In 2003–04, South Africa began the series with a final-ball victory in the first ODI, but lost all the remaining ODIs to lose the series 4–1. In 2004–05 the sides played two ODIs in the weeks leading up to the 2005 Women's Cricket World Cup which was being held in South Africa, two years after they had hosted the men's competition. South Africa lost both matches, and went on to have an unsuccessful tournament; in seven matches (of which one was abandoned and one had no result) South Africa only managed one victory; against West Indies. They finished the World Cup in seventh, and were eliminated. Following their elimination they hastily arranged a three-match ODI series against the West Indies, who had also been knocked out of the competition.

=== Late 2000s ===
Pakistan toured South Africa in 2007, a series that South Africa won 4–0, with no result. They then toured England and Netherlands. They won all their matches in the 2008 Women's Cricket World Cup Qualifier, beating Pakistan by 8 wickets in the final, and securing their place in the 2009 Women's Cricket World Cup.

== Governing body ==
Before 1952, women's cricket in South Africa was for the most part ungoverned. In 1952, following advice from the Women's Cricket Association, the South Africa & Rhodesian Women's Cricket Association (SA&RWCA) was formed to administer and organise the running of women's cricket in the country. During the years of isolation in the 1970s and 1980s, women's cricket was strong in South Africa, but with a lack of international competition, the game and governing body became defunct. The game was rejuvenated by the United Cricket Board of South Africa in 1995, when they ran a successful Women's/Girls' Tournament, and the South Africa Women's Cricket Association was formed.

== Tournament history ==
A red box around the year indicates tournaments played within South Africa

Key
Champions
Runners-up
Semi-finals

=== ODI World Cup ===
World Cup record
Year	Round	Position	GP	W	L	T	NR
(England) 1973 to (England) 1993	Did not participate						
(India) 1997	Quarterfinals	5th place	6	3	3	0	0
(New Zealand) 2000	Semifinals	4th place	8	4	4	0	0
(South Africa) 2005	Group Stage	7th place	7	1	4	0	2
(Australia) 2009	Group Stage	7th place	3	0	3	0	0
(India) 2013	Super sixes	6th place	9	2	7	0	0
(England) 2017	Semifinals	4th place	8	4	3	0	1
(New Zealand) 2022	Semifinals	4th place	8	5	2	0	1
(India) 2025	Final	Runners-Up	9	6	3	0	0
Total	8/13	0 Titles	58	25	29	0	4

=== T20 World Cup ===
T20 World Cup records
Host Year	Round	Position	GP	W	L	T	NR
(England) 2009	Group stage	8th	3	0	3	0	0
(Cricket West Indies) 2010	Group stage	8th	3	0	3	0	0
(Sri Lanka) 2012	Group stage	8th	3	1	2	0	0
(Bangladesh) 2014	Semifinals	4th	5	3	2	0	0
(India) 2016	Group stage	8th	4	1	3	0	0
(Cricket West Indies) 2018	Group stage	5th	4	2	2	0	0
(Australia) 2020	Semifinals	4th	5	3	1	0	1
(South Africa) 2023	Final	Runners-up	6	3	3	0	0
(United Arab Emirates) 2024	Final	Runners-up	6	4	2	0	0
(England) 2026	Qualified						
(Pakistan) 2028	To be determined						
Total	9/9	0 Titles	39	17	21	0	1

=== ICC Women's Championship ===
T20 World Cup records
Host Year	Round	Position	GP	W	L	T	NR
2014–16	Group Stage	6th place	21	8	12	0	1
2017–20	Group Stage	3rd place	21	14	6	0	1
2022–25	Group Stage	4th place	24	12	11	0	1
Total	3/3	0 Titles	66	34	29	0	3

=== Commonwealth Games ===
Commonwealth Games records
Host Year	Round	Position	GP	W	L	T	NR
(England) 2022	Group Stage	5th	3	1	2	0	0
Total	0 Title	-	3	1	2	0	0

=== World Cup Qualifier ===
T20 World Cup records
Host Year	Round	Position	GP	W	L	T	NR
2008	Final	1st place	5	5	0	0	0
2011	Semifinals	4th place	6	4	2	0	0
2017	Final	2nd place	9	8	1	0	0
Total	-	1 Title	20	17	3	0	0

=== ODI Cricket Challenge ===
ICC Women's Cricket Challenge records
Host Year	Round	Position	GP	W	L	T	NR
(South Africa) 2010	Final	1st	5	5	0	0	0
Total	1/1	1 Title	5	5	0	0	0

=== T20 Cricket Challenge ===
- 2010: 3rd place

== Honours ==
=== ICC ===
- Women's T20 World Cup:
  - Runners-up (2): 2023, 2024
- Women's ODI World Cup:
  - Runners-up (1): 2025

=== Other ===
- African Games
  - Silver medal (1): 2023

== Players ==
=== Current squad ===
This lists all the players who are centrally contracted with Cricket South Africa or was named in a recent squad. Updated on 1 July 2022.

Centrally contracted players are listed in bold.

Name	Age	Batting style	Bowling style	Forms	S/N
Batters
Tazmin Brits	8 January 1991 (age 35)	Right-handed		Test, ODI, T20I	1
**Lara Goodall**	26 April 1996 (age 30)	Right-handed	Right arm medium	Test, ODI, T20I	26
Andrie Steyn	23 November 1996 (age 29)	Right-handed	Right arm medium	Test, ODI, T20I	66
**Laura Wolvaardt**	26 April 1999 (age 27)	Right-handed	—	Test, ODI, T20I	14
All-rounders
**Suné Luus**	5 January 1996 (age 30)	Right-handed	Right arm leg spin	Test, ODI, T20I	96
Anneke Bosch	17 August 1993 (age 33)	Right-handed	Right arm medium	Test, ODI, T20I	27
**Nadine de Klerk**	16 January 2000 (age 26)	Right-handed	Right arm medium	Test, ODI, T20I	32
**Marizanne Kapp**	4 January 1990 (age 36)	Right-handed	Right arm medium	Test, ODI, T20I	7
**Chloe Tryon**	25 January 1994 (age 32)	Right-handed	Left arm medium-fast	Test, ODI, T20I	25
Delmi Tucker	5 March 1997 (age 29)	Right-handed	Right arm off spin	Test, ODI, WT20I	16
**Dane van Niekerk**	14 May 1993 (age 33)	Right-handed	Right arm leg spin	Test, ODI, T20I	81
Wicket-keepers
**Trisha Chetty**	26 June 1988 (age 38)	Right-handed		Test, ODI, T20I	8
**Sinalo Jafta**	22 December 1994 (age 31)	Left-handed		Test, ODI, T20I	10
Faye Tunnicliffe	9 December 1998 (age 27)	Right-handed		ODI, T20I	3
Spin Bowlers
Nonkululeko Mlaba	27 June 2000 (age 26)	Right-handed	Slow left-arm orthodox	Test, ODI, T20I	28
Raisibe Ntozakhe	29 November 1996 (age 29)	Right-handed	Right arm off spin	ODI, T20I	29
Nondumiso Shangase	5 April 1996 (age 30)	Right-handed	Right arm off spin	ODI, T20I	4
Pace Bowlers
**Shabnim Ismail**	5 October 1988 (age 38)	Left-handed	Right arm fast-medium	Test, ODI, T20I	89
**Ayabonga Khaka**	18 July 1992 (age 34)	Right-handed	Right arm medium	ODI, T20I	99
**Masabata Klaas**	3 February 1991 (age 35)	Right-handed	Right arm medium	Test, ODI, T20I	5
**Tumi Sekhukhune**	21 November 1998 (age 27)	Left-handed	Right arm fast-medium	Test, ODI, T20I	12

== Coaches ==
- 1997: Conrad Hunte
- 2000: Rodney Willemburg
- 2004–2005: Stephen Jones
- 2006–2010: Noor Rhode
- 2010–2012: Yashin Ebrahim
- 2012–2023: Hilton Moreeng
- 2024: Dillon du Preez (interim coach)
- 2024–: Mandla Mashimbyi

== Records ==
=== Test cricket ===
Despite being the oldest, and originally only, form of cricket played by women internationally, South Africa have played just sixteen Test matches (half of them against England), with the most recent Test being played against England in 2024. Their only win came against the Netherlands in 2007. Twenty20 cricket has taken on a far more prominent and lucrative role, almost eliminating Test cricket from the women's game altogether.

Highest total	373 v India	28 June 2024

Result summary

Opposition	Span	Matches	Won	Lost	Tied	Draw
Australia	2024	1	0	1	0	0
England	1960–2024	8	0	3	0	5
India	2001–2024	3	0	3	0	0
Netherlands	2007	1	1	0	0	0
New Zealand	1972	3	0	1	0	2
Total	1960–2024	16	1	8	0	7

As of 18 December 2024

==== Individual records ====
===== Most matches =====
Position	Player	Span	Matches
1	Jennifer Gove	1960–1972	7
1	Lorna Ward	1960–1972	7
3	Maureen Payne	1960–1972	5
4	Cri-Zelda Brits	2002–2007	4
4	Pamela Hollett	1960–1961	4
4	Eileen Hurly	1960–1961	4
4	Sheelagh Nefdt	1960–1961	4
4	Daleen Terblanche	2002–2007	4
4	Yvonne van Mentz	1960–1961	4
4	Anneke Bosch†	2022–2024	4
4	Nadine de Klerk†	2022–2024	4
4	Sinalo Jafta†	2022–2024	4
4	Marizanne Kapp†	2014–2024	4
4	Sune Luus†	2022–2024	4
4	Nonkululeko Mlaba†	2022–2024	4
4	Laura Wolvaardt†	2022–2024	4

As of 18 December 2024

===== Most runs =====
Position	Player	Span	Mat	Inns	Runs	HS	Ave	100	50
1	Marizanne Kapp†	2014–2024	4	8	395	150	56.42	1	2
2	Sune Luus†	2022–2024	4	8	299	109	37.37	1	2
3	Jennifer Gove	1960–1972	7	14	256	51*	25.60	0	1
4	Laura Wolvaardt†	2022–2024	4	8	255	122	31.87	1	1
5	Eileen Hurly	1960–1961	4	8	240	96*	34.28	0	1
6	Alison Hodgkinson	2002–2003	3	6	239	95	39.83	0	2
7	Sheelagh Nefdt	1960–1961	4	8	211	68	30.14	0	2
8	Daleen Terblanche	2002–2007	4	7	186	83	26.57	0	1
9	Yvonne van Mentz	1960–1961	4	7	186	105*	31.00	1	0
10	Carole Gildenhuys	1972	3	8	184	94	30.66	0	2

As of 18 December 2024

===== High scores =====
Position	Player	High score	Balls	4s	6s	Opponent	Date
1	Marizanne Kapp	150	213	26	0	England	27 June 2022
2	Laura Wolvaardt	122	314	16	0	New Zealand	28 June 2024
3	Sune Luus	109	203	18	0	England	28 June 2024
4	Yvonne van Mentz	105*	-	7	0	England	13 January 1961
5	Mignon du Preez	102	253	15	0	India	16 November 2014

As of 28 June 2024

===== Most wickets =====
Position	Player	Span	Mat	Inns	Wkts	BBI	BBM	Ave	Econ	SR	5	10
1	Lorna Ward	1960–1972	7	12	27	6/48	7/76	17.29	1.97	52.5	3	0
2	Nonkululeko Mlaba†	2022–2024	4	6	13	6/67	10/157	37.38	3.79	59.1	1	1
3	Gloria Williamson	1972–1972	3	6	12	3/28	4/57	18.41	1.93	57.1	0	0
4	Sunette Loubser	2007–2014	2	3	11	5/37	8/59	13.54	1.70	47.5	1	0
5	Jennifer Gove	1960–1972	7	8	9	3/57	4/91	31.55	2.49	75.8	0	0
6	Yvonne van Mentz	1960–1961	4	6	8	4/95	4/95	31.25	2.65	70.6	0	0
6	Maureen Payne	1960–1972	5	9	8	2/31	3/101	40.50	2.38	101.7	0	0
8	Jean McNaughton	1960–1961	3	6	6	6/39	6/54	19.33	2.52	46.0	1	0
9	Cri-zelda Brits	2002–2007	4	4	6	2/68	2/68	42.50	3.01	84.5	0	0
10	Denise Weyers	1972	3	6	5	3/33	4/67	40.80	1.85	132.0	0	0

As of 18 December 2024

===== Best bowling figures in an innings =====
Position	Player	Figures (wickets/runs)	Opponent	Date
1	Jean McNaughton	6/39	England	31 December 1960
2	Lorna Ward	6/48	New Zealand	24 March 1972
3	Nonkululeko Mlaba	6/67	England	15 December 2024
4	Lorna Ward	5/18	England	13 January 1961
5	Sunette Loubser	5/37	Netherlands	28 July 2007

As of 18 December 2024

=== ODI cricket ===
Highest total	337/5 (50 overs) v Ireland	11 May 2017

Result summary

Opposition	Span	Matches	Won	Lost	Tied	NR
Australia	1997–2025	19	1	17	1	0
Bangladesh	2012–2025	22	19	3	0	0
Denmark	1997–1997	1	1	0	0	0
England	1997–2025	48	11	36	0	1
India	1997–2025	35	13	21	0	1
Ireland	1997–2022	20	18	1	0	1
Netherlands	2000–2011	7	7	0	0	0
New Zealand	1999–2025	21	9	12	0	0
Pakistan	1997–2025	32	24	6	1	1
Sri Lanka	2000–2025	26	17	6	0	2
West Indies	2005–2025	36	18	11	1	2
Total	1997–2025	267	138	113	3	8

As of 2 November 2025

==== Individual records ====
===== Most matches =====
Position	Player	Span	Matches
1	Marizanne Kapp†	2009–2025	162
2	Mignon du Preez	2007–2022	154
3	Sune Luus†	2012–2025	143
4	Trisha Chetty	2007–2022	134
5	Shabnim Ismail	2007–2022	127

As of 2 November 2025

===== Most runs =====
Position	Player	Span	Mat	Inns	Runs	HS	Ave	100	50
1	Laura Wolvaardt†	2016–2025	120	119	5253	184*	50.50	11	38
2	Mignon du Preez	2007–2022	154	141	3760	116*	32.98	2	18
3	Marizanne Kapp†	2009–2025	162	139	3511	121*	35.11	4	17
4	Lizelle Lee	2013–2022	100	99	3315	132*	36.42	3	23
5	Sune Luus†	2012–2025	143	123	2738	107*	26.07	1	18
6	Trisha Chetty	2007–2022	134	113	2703	95	27.86	0	16
7	Chloe Tryon†	2011–2025	124	102	2292	92	26.65	0	14
8	Dane van Niekerk†	2009–2025	108	84	2175	102	36.25	1	9
9	Tazmin Brits†	2021–2025	49	49	1681	171*	36.54	7	3
10	Cri-zelda Brits	2002–2013	69	63	1622	107*	28.96	1	11

As of 2 November 2025

===== High scores =====
Position	Player	High score	Balls	4s	6s	SR	Opponent	Date
1	Laura Wolvaardt	184*	147	23	4	125.17	Sri Lanka	17 April 2024
2	Tazmin Brits	171*	182	20	4	121.27	Pakistan	19 September 2025
3	Laura Wolvaardt	169	143	20	4	118.18	England	29 October 2025
4	Johmari Logtenberg	153*	160	12	1	95.62	Netherlands	5 August 2007
5	Laura Wolvaardt	149	149	17	0	100.00	Ireland	11 May 2017

As of 29 October 2025

===== Most wickets =====
Position	Player	Span	Mat	Inns	Wkts	BBI	Ave	Econ	SR	4	5
1	Shabnim Ismail	2007–2022	127	126	191	6/10	19.95	3.70	32.3	6	2
2	Marizanne Kapp†	2009–2025	162	152	181	5/20	24.24	3.84	37.8	4	2
3	Ayabonga Khaka†	2012–2025	119	118	142	5/26	27.20	4.28	38.0	2	1
4	Dane van Niekerk†	2009–2025	108	103	138	5/17	19.14	3.46	33.1	6	2
5	Suné Luus†	2012–2025	143	102	118	6/36	23.88	4.54	31.5	3	5
6	Masabata Klaas†	2010–2025	87	84	84	4/25	32.15	5.00	38.5	2	0
7	Sunette Loubser	2007–2014	60	57	80	5/27	17.40	3.06	34.0	2	1
8	Nadine de Klerk†	2017–2025	58	55	68	4/32	27.45	5.00	32.8	1	0
9	Chloe Tryon†	2011–2025	124	92	62	5/34	39.74	4.42	53.8	0	1
10	Nonkululeko Mlaba†	2021–2025	47	46	54	4/33	32.46	4.81	40.4	2	0

As of 14 December 2025

===== Best bowling figures in an innings =====
Position	Player	Figures (wickets/runs)	Overs	Opponent	Date
1	Shabnim Ismail	6/10	8.3	Netherlands	18 November 2011
2	Suné Luus	6/36	10.0	Ireland	5 August 2016
3	Suné Luus	6/45	10.0	New Zealand	30 January 2020
4	Alicia Smith	5/7	8.0	Pakistan	24 February 2008
5	Shabnim Ismail	5/8	8.5	Ireland	17 June 2022

As of 1 July 2022

=== Twenty20 International cricket ===
Highest total	205/1 (20 overs) v Netherlands	14 October 2010

Result summary

Opposition	Span	Matches	Won	Lost	Tied	NR
Australia	2009–2024	10	1	9	0	0
Bangladesh	2012–2023	14	11	2	0	1
England	2007–2023	24	4	19	0	1
India	2014–2023	16	5	9	0	2
Ireland	2008–2022	13	11	2	0	0
Netherlands	2010	1	1	0	0	0
Namibia	2024	1	0	1	0	0
New Zealand	2007–2023	16	4	11	0	1
Pakistan	2010–2021	21	11	10	0	0
Sri Lanka	2012–2023	14	10	4	0	0
Tanzania	2024	1	1	0	0	0
Thailand	2020	1	1	0	0	0
West Indies	2009–2023	22	7	14	0	1
Total	2007–2024	154	67	81	0	6

As of 8 March 2024

==== Individual records ====
===== Most matches =====
Position	Player	Span	Matches
1	Mignon du Preez	2007–2022	114
2	Shabnim Ismail	2007–2023	107
3	Suné Luus	2007–2023	96
4	Marizanne Kapp	2009–2021	88
5	Dane van Niekerk	2009–2021	86

As of 2 February 2023

===== Most runs =====
Position	Player	Span	Mat	Inns	Runs	HS	Ave	SR	100	50	4s	6s
1	Lizelle Lee	2013–2021	82	82	1896	101	25.62	25.62	1	13	227	48
2	Dane van Niekerk	2009–2021	86	77	1877	90*	28.08	94.94	0	10	197	31
3	Mignon du Preez	2007–2022	114	104	1805	69	20.98	101.23	0	7	179	21
4	Marizanne Kapp	2009–2023	88	73	1120	56*	19.64	95.48	0	2	83	12
5	Trisha Chetty	2007–2022	82	72	1117	55	17.18	88.09	0	3	99	3

As of 1 July 2022

===== High scores =====
Position	Player	High score	Balls	4s	6s	SR	Opponent	Date
1	Shandre Fritz	116*	71	12	2	163.38	Netherlands	14 October 2010
2	Lizelle Lee	101	60	16	3	168.33	Thailand	28 February 2020
3	Dane van Niekerk	90*	66	13	1	136.36	Pakistan	23 March 2014
4	Lizelle Lee	84	47	15	1	136.36	India	4 October 2019
5	Lizelle Lee	75*	48	11	2	156.26	Pakistan	23 May 2019

As of 1 July 2022

===== Most wickets =====
Position	Player	Span	Mat	Inns	Wkts	BBI	Ave	Econ	SR	4	5
1	Shabnim Ismail	2007–2022	100	99	112	5/12	18.10	5.76	18.8	0	2
2	Marizanne Kapp	2009–2021	84	73	66	4/6	19.96	5.45	21.9	1	0
3	Dane van Niekerk	2009–2021	86	82	65	4/17	20.96	5.45	23.0	1	0
4	Suné Luus	2012–2022	86	64	48	5/8	21.72	6.55	19.8	1	2
5	Ayabonga Khaka	2007–2022	37	37	33	4/23	22.90	6.34	21.6	1	0

As of 1 July 2022

===== Best bowling figures in an innings =====
Position	Player	Figures (wickets/runs)	Overs	Opponent	Date
1	Suné Luus	5/8	4.0	Ireland	23 March 2016
2	Shabnim Ismail	5/12	4.0	Pakistan	31 January 2021
3	Nondumiso Shangase	5/13	3.3	Tanzania	8 March 2024
4	Suné Luus	5/14	3.4	Sri Lanka	3 February 2019
5	Shabnim Ismail	5/30	3.5	India	18 February 2018

^{1} Included a hat-trick.

As of 8 March 2024

== See also ==
- South African men's cricket team
- List of South Africa women ODI cricketers
- List of South Africa women Twenty20 International cricketers

== Bibliography ==
- Booth, Douglas (1998). The Race Game: Sport and Politics in South Africa. Routledge. ISBN 0-7146-4799-3.
- Heyhoe Flint, Rachael; Rheinberg, Netta (1976). Fair Play. London: Angus and Robertson. ISBN 0-207-95698-7.
- May, Peter (2009). The Rebel Tours: Cricket's Crisis of Conscience. Sportsbooks. p. 320. ISBN 978-1-899807-80-2.
- Odendaal, André (2003). The Story of an African Game: Black Cricketers and the Unmasking of One of South Africa's Greatest Myths. David Philip, Publishers. p. 367. ISBN 978-0-86486-638-7.
- Williams, Jack (2001). Cricket and Race. Oxford: Berg. p. 224. ISBN 978-1-85973-309-7.
