= New Zealand women's cricket team in England in 1966 =

Cricket team

	England	New Zealand
- Dates: 21 May – 6 August 1966
Captains	Rachael Heyhoe Flint	Trish McKelvey

Test series
- Result: 3-match series drawn 0–0
Most runs	Rachael Heyhoe Flint (356)	Carol Oyler (174)
Most wickets	Eileen Vigor (11)	Jos Burley (13)

The New Zealand women's national cricket team toured England between May and August 1966. They played against England in three Test matches, with all three matches being drawn.

== Squads ==
England	New Zealand
Rachael Heyhoe Flint (c); Edna Barker; June Bragger; Lesley Clifford; Audrey Disbury; Rosemary Goodchild; Polly Marshall; Mary Pilling; Sheila Plant (wk); Anne Sanders; June Stephenson; Lynne Thomas; Eileen Vigor; Jacqueline Whitney	Trish McKelvey (c); Phyl Blackler; Bev Brentnall (wk); Jos Burley; Wendy Coe; Judi Doull; Shirley Englehardt; Wendy Fitzwilliam; Jackie Lord; Betty Maker; Pat Moore; Carol Oyler; Jill Saulbrey; Janice Stead; Jean Stonell

== Tour Matches ==
=== 1-day single innings match: Middlesex v New Zealand ===
21 May 1966
Scorecard

New Zealand; 184/4d (76 overs)	v	Middlesex; 124/9 (56 overs)
Phyl Blackler 83* (–); Sylvia Stapleton 3/49 (17 overs)		Anne Sanders 41 (–); Wendy Fitzwilliam 5/37 (15 overs)

Match drawn
Headstone Recreation Ground, Harrow
Umpires: Jayne Ayres (Eng) and May Howard (Eng)

- Middlesex Women won the toss and elected to field.

=== 1-day single innings match: Kent v New Zealand ===
25 May 1966
Scorecard

New Zealand; 25/1 (10 overs)	v	Kent
Betty Maker 10* (–); Mary Pilling 1/12 (5 overs)

Match drawn
Vine Cricket Ground, Sevenoaks
Umpires: Iris Doble (Eng) and Elizabeth Riley (Eng)

- New Zealand Women won the toss and elected to bat.

=== 2-day match: East of England v New Zealand ===
28 – 29 May 1966
Scorecard

New Zealand	v	East of England
307/3d (84 overs); Pat Moore 143 (–); Heather Dewdney 2/15 (3 overs)		164 (86.3 overs); Pat Duberley 42 (–); Jos Burley 5/40 (27.3 overs)
74 (51.2 overs) (f/o); Jean Lillico 26 (–); Phyl Blackler 6/22 (14.2 overs)

New Zealand Women won by an innings and 69 runs
Parker's Piece, Cambridge
Umpires: May Howard (Eng) and Isabel Nowell-Smith (Eng)

- New Zealand Women won the toss and elected to bat.

=== 1-day single innings match: East Anglia v New Zealand ===
1 June 1966
Scorecard

New Zealand; 237/4d (67 overs)	v	East Anglia; 60 (39.2 overs)
Carol Oyler 106* (–); Isabel Cranwell 2/49 (20 overs)		Pamela Crain 32 (–); Phyl Blackler 6/18 (13 overs)

New Zealand Women won by 177 runs
Eltisley Cricket Ground, Eltisley
Umpires: May Howard (Eng) and Sylvia Swinburne (Eng)

- East Anglia Women won the toss and elected to field.

=== 1-day single innings match: Midlands v New Zealand ===
4 June 1966
Scorecard

New Zealand; 205/5d (86 overs)	v	Midlands; 100 (39.4 overs)
Trish McKelvey 57* (–); June Bragger 2/43 (27 overs)		June Bragger 42 (–); Wendy Fitzwilliam 3/4 (3.4 overs)

New Zealand Women won by 105 runs
GIC Sports Ground, Borrowash
Umpires: HM Bond (Eng) and Margaret Lockwood (Eng)

- Midlands Women won the toss and elected to field.

=== 1-day match: Northern Counties v New Zealand ===
8 June 1966
Scorecard

Northern Counties	v	New Zealand
72 (29.5 overs); Ann Hall 22 (–); Jos Burley 4/7 (8 overs)		139/0d (55 overs); Judi Doull 71* (–)
114/8 (42 overs); Ann Hall 39 (–); Jos Burley 3/9 (10 overs)

Match drawn (New Zealand Women won on first innings)
Stockport Road, Timperley
Umpires: Jane Ayres (Eng) and J Dines (Eng)

- New Zealand Women won the toss and elected to field.

=== 2-day match: North of England v New Zealand ===
11, 13 June 1966
Scorecard

New Zealand	v	North of England
99 (78.2 overs); Wendy Coe 20 (–); June Stephenson 4/23 (20.2 overs)		140/8d (62.1 overs); Brenda Rothera 41* (–); Jill Saulbrey 3/27 (18 overs)
27/4 (28.2 overs); Phyl Blackler 18 (–); Dorothy Macfarlane 2/13 (8 overs)

Match drawn
Church Road, Lytham St Annes
Umpires: Jane Ayres (Eng) and Margaret Lockwood (Eng)

- New Zealand Women won the toss and elected to bat.

=== 1-day single innings match: Yorkshire v New Zealand ===
15 June 1966
Scorecard

New Zealand; 161/7d (84 overs)	v	Yorkshire; 92/8 (50 overs)
Jos Burley 29* (–); L Ayres 4/17 (19 overs)		Lesley Clifford 33 (–); Jos Burley 3/11 (16 overs)

Match drawn
College Grove, Wakefield
Umpires: Ora Carse (Eng) and Margaret Lockwood (Eng)

- Yorkshire Women won the toss and elected to field.

=== 1-day single innings match: Midlands v New Zealand ===
25 June 1966
Scorecard

New Zealand; 26/3 (27.3 overs)	v	Midlands
Pat Moore 13 (–); B Richards 1/3 (7 overs)

Match drawn
Courtaulds Cricket Club Ground, Wolverhampton
Umpires: HM Bond (Eng) and P Greenwood (Eng)

- New Zealand Women won the toss and elected to bat.

=== 1-day single innings match: Midlands v New Zealand ===
29 June 1966
Scorecard

Midlands; 97 (65 overs)	v	New Zealand; 100/1 (45 overs)
Ruth Wheeler 46 (–); Pat Moore 4/20 (14 overs)		Pat Moore 62* (–); Dawn Francis 1/17 (16 overs)

New Zealand Women won by 9 wickets
Swans Nest Lane, Stratford-upon-Avon
Umpires: HM Bond (Eng) and M Cox (Eng)

- New Zealand Women won the toss and elected to field.

=== 2-day match: West of England v New Zealand ===
4 – 5 July 1966
Scorecard

New Zealand	v	West of England
166 (84 overs); Trish McKelvey 40 (–); Lynne Thomas 4/43 (18 overs)		110/8d (74 overs); Kay Green 40 (–); Jackie Lord 5/22 (12 overs)

Match drawn
Recreation Ground, Torquay
Umpires: Peg Culver (Eng) and Anne Flann (Eng)

- West of England Women won the toss and elected to field.

=== 1-day single innings match: Western Counties v New Zealand ===
7 July 1966
Scorecard

Western Counties; 133 (80.4 overs)	v	New Zealand; 134/8 (40.2 overs)
Kay Green 35 (–); Jackie Lord 7/34 (19.4 overs)		Phyl Blackler 34 (–); M Riley 3/16 (6.5 overs)

New Zealand Women won by 2 wickets
Racecourse Ground, Hereford, Hereford
Umpires: Peg Culver (Eng) and Anne Flann (Eng)

- New Zealand Women won the toss and elected to field.

=== 1-day single innings match: Sussex v New Zealand ===
14 July 1966
Scorecard

Sussex; 217/4d (70 overs)	v	New Zealand; 207/5 (51 overs)
Sheila Richards 83* (–); Shirley Englehardt 2/40 (13 overs)		Phyl Blackler 70 (–); Hilary Smith 2/33 (9 overs)

Match drawn
County Ground, Hove
Umpires: Doris Turner (Eng) and Iris Doble (Eng)

- New Zealand Women won the toss and elected to field.

=== 2-day match: South of England v New Zealand ===
16, 18 July 1966
Scorecard

South of England	v	New Zealand
137 (68 overs); Pat Smyth 55 (–); Jos Burley 5/33 (20 overs)		142/5d (81 overs); Trish McKelvey 55* (–); Rosemary Goodchild 3/52 (30 overs)
154/3d (36 overs); Sheila Plant 59* (–); Jos Burley 1/34 (9 overs)		71/6 (38 overs); Wendy Coe 30 (–); Rosemary Goodchild 2/23 (11 overs)

Match drawn
Central Recreation Ground, Hastings
Umpires: Elizabeth Riley (Eng) and Sylvia Swinburne (Eng)

- New Zealand Women won the toss and elected to field.

=== 1-day single innings match: Surrey v New Zealand ===
20 July 1966
Scorecard

Surrey	v	New Zealand

Match Abandoned
Mitcham Cricket Green, Mitcham

- No toss.
- No play possible due to rain.

=== 2-day match: Women's Cricket Association v New Zealand ===
23, 25 July 1966
Scorecard

New Zealand	v	Women's Cricket Association
94 (55.5 overs); Pat Moore 21 (–); Rosemary Goodchild 4/26 (16 overs)		103/8d (57 overs); Lynne Thomas 18 (–); Jos Burley 3/24 (14 overs)
189/2d (88 overs); Judi Doull 117* (–); Pam Trosh 1/15 (5 overs)		175 (51.4 overs); Jacqueline Whitney 86 (–); Jill Saulbrey 6/73 (20.4 overs)

New Zealand Women won by 5 runs
Convent Lane, Cobham
Umpires: Doris Turner (Eng) and May Howard (Eng)

- Women's Cricket Association won the toss and elected to field.

=== 1-day single innings match: Young England v New Zealand ===
27 July 1966
Scorecard

New Zealand; 184/5d (78 overs)	v	Young England; 68 (47 overs)
Judi Doull 60 (–); E Bramhall 2/21 (9 overs)		Prue Hyman 25 (–); Pat Moore 3/1 (7 overs)

New Zealand Women won by 116 runs
Arden Field, Finchley
Umpires: Peg Culver (Eng) and Isabel Nowell-Smith (Eng)

- Young England Women won the toss and elected to field.

=== 1-day single innings match: Women's Cricket Association President's XI v New Zealand ===
30 July 1966
Scorecard

New Zealand; 109 (64.4 overs)	v	Women's Cricket Association President's XI; 0/0 (3.2 overs)
Trish McKelvey 38 (–); Mary Pilling 3/10 (8.4 overs)		Cecilia Robinson 0* (–)

Match drawn
Dartford College of Physical Education, Dartford
Umpires: Netta Rheinberg (Eng) and Sylvia Swinburne (Eng)

- Women's Cricket Association President's XI won the toss and elected to field.

=== 1-day single innings match: Buckinghamshire v New Zealand ===
3 August 1966
Scorecard

Buckinghamshire	v	New Zealand

Match Abandoned
Wilton Park, Beaconsfield

- No toss.
- No play possible due to rain.

== WTest Series ==
=== 1st Test ===
18 – 21 June 1966
Scorecard

England	v	New Zealand
273/6d (100 overs); Rachael Heyhoe Flint 113 (–); Jos Burley 3/68 (36 overs)		178 (161.4 overs); Judi Doull 74 (–); June Stephenson 4/38 (38 overs)
134/2d (41 overs); Rachael Heyhoe Flint 59* (–); Betty Maker 1/31 (7 overs)		79/2 (54 overs); Carol Oyler 36* (–); Eileen Vigor 2/7 (16 overs)

Match drawn
North Marine Road Ground, Scarborough
Umpires: Isabel Nowell-Smith (Eng) and Jayne Ayres (Eng)

- England Women won the toss and elected to bat.
- Lesley Clifford, June Stephenson, Jacqueline Whitney (Eng), Bev Brentnall, Jos Burley, Judi Doull, Jackie Lord, Betty Maker, Trish McKelvey, Carol Oyler, Jill Saulbrey and Janice Stead (NZ) all made their WTest debuts.

=== 2nd Test ===
9 – 12 July 1966
Scorecard

New Zealand	v	England
131 (85 overs); Jill Saulbrey 32* (–); Eileen Vigor 3/24 (19 overs)		275/7d (106 overs); Rachael Heyhoe Flint 85 (–); Jackie Lord 2/56 (27 overs)
300/7d (172 overs); Bev Brentnall 84* (–); Edna Barker 4/94 (44 overs)		58/4 (24 overs); Rachael Heyhoe Flint 26 (–); Jackie Lord 2/17 (7 overs)

Match drawn
Edgbaston Cricket Ground, Birmingham
Umpires: May Howard (Eng) and Peg Culver (Eng)

- New Zealand Women won the toss and elected to bat.
- Lynne Thomas (Eng) and Wendy Coe (NZ) both made their WTest debuts.

=== 3rd Test ===
6 – 9 August 1966
Scorecard

England	v	New Zealand
154/9d (78 overs); Audrey Disbury 44 (–); Betty Maker 3/34 (18 overs)		224/9d (112 overs); Phyl Blackler 68 (–); Eileen Vigor 3/64 (28 overs)
153 (114.2 overs); Lesley Clifford 32 (–); Jos Burley 7/41 (34.2 overs)		35/0 (9 overs); Judi Doull 20* (–)

Match drawn
The Oval, London
Umpires: Doris Turner (Eng) and Sylvia Swinburne (Eng)

- England Women won the toss and elected to bat.
- Rosemary Goodchild (Eng) made her WTest debut.
