= New Zealand women's cricket team in Australia in 1971–72 =

	Australia	New Zealand
- Dates: 2 January – 15 February 1972
Captains	Miriam Knee	Trish McKelvey

Test series
- Result: New Zealand won the 1-match series 1–0
Most runs	Dawn Rae (53)	Janice Stead (120)
Most wickets	Lesley Johnston (8)	Pat Carrick (9)

The New Zealand women's national cricket team toured Australia in January and February 1972. They played against Australia in one Test match, which they won by 143 runs. The tour preceded New Zealand's tour of South Africa.

== Squads ==
Australia	New Zealand
Miriam Knee (c); Shirley Banfield; Wendy Blunsden; Elaine Bray; Margaret Jennings (wk); Lesley Johnston; Tina Macpherson; Patsy May; Dawn Rae; Raelee Thompson; Bev Wilson	Trish McKelvey (c); Liz Allan; Bev Brentnall (wk); Pat Carrick; Shirley Cowles; Judi Doull; Jackie Lord; Lynda Prichard; Jill Saulbrey; Janice Stead; Elaine White

== Tour Matches ==
=== 2-day match: New South Wales Under-25s v New Zealand ===
2 – 3 January 1972
Scorecard

New Zealand	v	New South Wales Under-25s
108 (54.3 overs); Trish McKelvey 48 (–); Denise Eggleton 5/33 (20.3 overs)		73 (31.6 overs); Marie Cornish 16 (–); Jackie Lord 4/28 (10 overs)
193/4d (56.2 overs); Shirley Cowles 56 (–); Elizabeth Franks 1/13 (6 overs)		131 (41.5 overs); Denise Eggleton 53* (–); Jackie Lord 5/35 (10.5 overs)

New Zealand Women won by 97 runs
Raleigh Park, Sydney
Umpires: A MacDonald (Aus) and N Welfare (Aus)

- New South Wales Under-25s Women won the toss and elected to field.

=== 1-day single innings match: North Harbour v New Zealand ===
5 January 1972
Scorecard

New Zealand; 145/6d (51 overs)	v	North Harbour; 85/8 (28 overs)
Bev Brentnall 42 (–); Tina Macpherson 3/28 (14 overs)		Sue Prell 16 (–); Pat Carrick 3/11 (7 overs)

Match drawn
Manly Oval, Sydney
Umpires: A Debnam (Aus) and David Frede (Aus)

- North Harbour Women won the toss and elected to field.

=== 1-day single innings match: South Harbour v New Zealand ===
6 January 1972
Scorecard

New Zealand; 126/3d (28.7 overs)	v	South Harbour; 4/0 (1 over)
Janice Stead 60 (–); Patsy May 1/24 (10.7 overs)		Jackie Potter 0* (8)

Match drawn
Caringbah Oval, Sydney
Umpires: David Frede (Aus) and R Watson (Aus)

- South Harbour Women won the toss and elected to field.

=== 2-day match: New South Wales v New Zealand ===
8 – 9 January 1972
Scorecard

New South Wales	v	New Zealand
154 (41.6 overs); Wendy Weir 48* (–); Jill Saulbrey 4/32 (15 overs)		222/9d (82 overs); Judi Doull 70 (–); Patsy May 4/54 (25 overs)
157/9d (50 overs); Bev Wilson 40 (–); Jackie Lord 8/63 (17 overs)		36/2 (10 overs); Liz Allan 18 (–); Ann Mitchell 1/7 (1 over)

Match drawn
Caringbah Park, Sydney

- New Zealand Women won the toss and elected to field.

=== 1-day match: Australian Women's Cricket Council President's XI v New Zealand ===
11 January 1972
Scorecard

Australian Women's Cricket Council President's XI	v	New Zealand
164 (53.3 overs); Tina Macpherson 37 (–); Glenys Page 4/47 (19 overs)		171/7 (48 overs); Trish McKelvey 76* (–); Jackie Potter 2/8 (3 overs)

Match drawn
Forsyth Park, Sydney
Umpires: David Frede (Aus) and B Wilson (Aus)

- New Zealand Women won the toss and elected to field.
- New Zealand Women won on first innings.

=== 2-day match: South Australia Junior v New Zealand ===
14 – 15 January 1972
Scorecard

New Zealand	v	South Australia Junior
215/1d (62 overs); Judi Doull 104* (–); E Briscoe 1/24 (11 overs)		78 (39.2 overs); Sue Adair 29 (–); Carol Marett 3/9 (11 overs)
		74 (53.2 overs) (f/o); E Briscoe 18 (–); Jackie Lord 5/20 (13.2 overs)

New Zealand Women won by an innings and 63 runs
St Peter's College, Adelaide
Umpires: Wendy Blunsden (Aus) and J Hinkley (Aus)

- New Zealand Women won the toss and elected to bat.

=== 2-day match: South Australia v New Zealand ===
18 – 19 January 1972
Scorecard

New Zealand	v	South Australia
189/8d (69.7 overs); Janice Stead 48 (–); K Smith 3/48 (12 overs)		66 (37.1 overs); Lyn Mays 22 (–); Pat Carrick 3/11 (8 overs)
		84 (40 overs) (f/o); Christine Garwood 26* (–); Jackie Lord 4/26 (12 overs)

New Zealand Women won by an innings and 39 runs
St Peter's College, Adelaide
Umpires: Robin Bailhache (Aus) and A Cooper (Aus)

- South Australia Women won the toss and elected to field.

=== 2-day match: South Australia v New Zealand ===
21 – 22 January 1972
Scorecard

South Australia	v	New Zealand
128 (66.5 overs); Sue Adair 40 (–); Jackie Lord 4/29 (16.5 overs)		194/8d (76 overs); Trish McKelvey 36 (–); K Smith 3/54 (14 overs)
105/6d (48 overs); D Ayling 36* (–); Jill Saulbrey 2/15 (13 overs)		32/2 (7 overs); Jill Saulbrey 10 (–); K Smith 2/14 (2 overs)

Match drawn
St Peter's College, Adelaide
Umpires: Liz Allan (NZ) and K Laburn (Aus)

- South Australia Women won the toss and elected to bat.

=== 45-over match: South Australia Junior v New Zealand ===
24 January 1972
Scorecard

South Australia Junior; 104 (39.7 overs)	v	New Zealand; 105/5 (25 overs)
Sue Adair 46 (–); Jenny Olson 4/17 (7.7 overs)		Ethna Rouse 57* (–); R Shillaker 2/14 (4 overs)

New Zealand Women won by 5 wickets
St Peter's College, Adelaide

- New Zealand Women won the toss and elected to field.

=== 2-day match: Victoria Invitation XI v New Zealand ===
27 – 28 January 1972
Scorecard

Victoria Invitation XI	v	New Zealand
190/9d (78 overs); Cathy Garlick 81* (–); Jill Saulbrey 4/32 (25 overs)		208/1d (75.3 overs); Janice Stead 100* (–); Helen Morgan 1/45 (19.3 overs)
107/1 (37 overs); Jenny Howe 41* (–)

Match drawn
Scotch College Ground, Melbourne
Umpires: C Anderson (Aus) and R Gray (Aus)

- Victoria Women's Invitation XI won the toss and elected to bat.

=== 2-day match: Victoria Invitation XI v New Zealand ===
30 – 31 January 1972
Scorecard

New Zealand	v	Victoria
111 (63.7 overs); Bev Brentnall 33* (–); Dawn Rae 3/9 (6.7 overs)		206/7d (90 overs); Dawn Rae 69 (–); Jackie Lord 3/42 (14 overs)
64/8 (49 overs); Shirley Cowles 19 (–); Raelee Thompson 6/21 (16 overs)

Match drawn
Melbourne Grammar School, Melbourne
Umpires: J Gray (Aus) and R Marsden (Aus)

- Victoria Women won the toss and elected to field.

=== 40-over match: Victoria Junior v New Zealand ===
2 February 1972
Scorecard

Victoria Junior; 111/8 (40 overs)	v	New Zealand; 112/4 (26.5 overs)
B Page 32 (–); Elaine White 2/12 (6 overs)		Janice Stead 33 (–); B Page 3/18 (6.5 overs)

New Zealand Women won by 6 wickets
Scotch College Ground, Melbourne

- Victoria Junior Women won the toss and elected to bat.

=== 2-day match: Western Australia v New Zealand ===
12 – 13 February 1972
Scorecard

Western Australia	v	New Zealand
98 (51.6 overs); Jan Law-Davis 20 (–); Jackie Lord 4/32 (16 overs)		189/4d (64 overs); Trish McKelvey 78* (–); Betty Ellis 2/27 (15 overs)
95 (47 overs); C King 35 (–); Jackie Lord 4/24 (10 overs)		5/0 (2.6 overs); Glenys Page 5* (–)

New Zealand Women won by 10 wickets
College Oval, Trinity College, Perth

- Toss not known.

=== 40-over match: Australian Women's Cricket Council President's XI v New Zealand ===
15 February 1972
Scorecard

Australian Women's Cricket Council President's XI; 132 (40 overs)	v	New Zealand; 134/1 (31.3 overs)
Judy Shearman 56* (–); Carol Marett 3/38 (8 overs)		Janice Stead 60* (–); Jan Law-Davis 1/26 (7 overs)

New Zealand Women won by 9 wickets
Richardson Park, Perth

- New Zealand Women won the toss and elected to field.

== WTest Series ==
=== 1st Test ===
5 – 8 February 1972
Scorecard

New Zealand	v	Australia
89 (42.2 overs); Janice Stead 25 (–); Lesley Johnston 7/24 (13.2 overs)		129 (65.4 overs); Dawn Rae 38 (–); Pat Carrick 6/29 (19.4 overs)
335 (136.1 overs); Janice Stead 95 (–); Tina Macpherson 3/62 (23 overs)		152 (85.1 overs); Raelee Thompson 25 (–); Jill Saulbrey 4/50 (38 overs)

New Zealand Women won by 143 runs
St Kilda Cricket Ground, Melbourne
Umpires: J Gray (Aus) and R Marsden (Aus)

- New Zealand Women won the toss and elected to bat.
- Shirley Banfield, Wendy Blunsden, Margaret Jennings, Lesley Johnston, Tina Macpherson, Dawn Rae, Raelee Thompson, Bev Wilson (Aus), Liz Allan, Lynda Prichard and Elaine White (NZ) all made their WTest debuts.
