= England women's cricket team in Australia and New Zealand in 1957–58 =

International cricket tour

English women's cricket team in New Zealand in 1957–58
	New Zealand	England
- Dates: 5 November 1957 – 2 January 1958
Captains	Rona McKenzie	Mary Duggan

Test series
- Result: 2-match series drawn 0–0
Most runs	Eris Paton (120)	Mary Duggan (210)
Most wickets	Jean Coulston (10)	Mary Duggan (14)

The English women's cricket team toured New Zealand and Australia between November 1957 and March 1958. Against New Zealand they played two Test matches, which were both drawn.

Against Australia, they contested The Women's Ashes for the fifth time. The four match Test series was drawn 0–0, which resulted in Australia retaining the Ashes.

== Tour of New Zealand ==
=== Tour matches ===
==== 2-day match: North Island vs England ====
5–6 November 1957
Scorecard

North Island	v	England
175 (107.1 overs); Verna Coutts 74; Mary Duggan 4/32 (36 overs)		3d/80 (39.4 overs); Joan Wilkinson 34; Joyce Currie 1/10 (12 overs)
5d/82 (58 overs); Rona McKenzie 31; Betty Birch 2/7 (6 overs)		0/20 (25 overs); Joan Wilkinson 12

Match drawn
Basin Reserve, Wellington
Umpires: Ron Dore (NZ) and Mandy Maris (NZ)

- North Island Women won the toss and elected to bat.

==== 2-day match: Canterbury vs England ====
9, 11 November 1957
Scorecard

England	v	Canterbury
4d/208 (75 overs); Joan Wilkinson 53; Phyl Blackler 2/62 (16 overs)		8d/213 (134 overs); Phyl Blackler 43; Audrey Disbury 3/42 (21 overs)
9/85 (36 overs); Mary Duggan 19; Loretta Bayliss 5/20 (13 overs)

Match drawn
Hagley Oval, Christchurch

- England Women won the toss and elected to bat.

==== 2-day match: Otago vs England ====
15–16 November 1957
Scorecard

Otago	v	England
102 (60.5 overs); Mary Webb 34; Audrey Disbury 3/29 (16 overs)		3d/198 (70.4 overs); Helen Sharpe 53; Eris Paton 1/21 (8 overs)
9/65 (51 overs); Mary Webb 26; Dorothy Macfarlane 3/9 (14 overs)

Match drawn
North Ground, Dunedin
Umpires: Jim Harwood (NZ) and H Singleton (NZ)

- Otago Women won the toss and elected to bat.

==== 1-day match: Southland vs England ====
20 November 1957
Scorecard

Southland	v	England
25 (31 overs); Irene West 8 Edna Barker 4/9 (8 overs)		8d/202 (47 overs); Joan Wilkinson 56; Rona Cross 3/54 (16 overs)
0/0 (2 overs); Noelene Pay 0*

Match drawn
Waverley Park, Invercargill
Umpires: George Ayres (NZ) and Bob Pollok (NZ)

- Southland Women won the toss and elected to bat.
- England Women won by 10 wickets on first innings.

==== 2-day match: South Island vs England ====
23, 25 November 1957
Scorecard

South Island	v	England
141 (87 overs); Eris Paton 41; Mary Duggan 6/30 (19 overs)		2d/134 (48 overs); Betty Birch 69*; Phyl Blackler 1/19 (6 overs)
0/12 (12 overs); Mary Webb 10*

Match drawn
Carisbrook, Dunedin
Umpires: Jim Harwood (NZ) and Eric Proctor (NZ)

- England Women won the toss and elected to field.

==== 1-day match: Nelson vs England ====
4 December 1957
Scorecard

England; 8d/191 (48.1 overs)	v	Nelson; 71 (56.5 overs)
Edna Barker 74; Dorothy Bennett 3/18 (6 overs)		Sally Davies 18; Polly Marshall 3/6 (17 overs)

England Women won by 120 runs
Trafalgar Park, Nelson
Umpires: A Paterson (NZ) and Laurie Quinton (NZ)

- England Women won the toss and elected to bat.

==== 2-day match: Wellington vs England ====
23, 25 November 1957
Scorecard

Wellington	v	England
115 (86 overs); Joyce Currie 29; Joan Hawes 4/22 (20 overs)		4d/182 (69.5 overs); Cecilia Robinson 78*; Jean Coulston 2/56 (26.5 overs)
130 (82.4 overs); Gwen Sutherland 26; Edna Barker 4/36 (23 overs)		5/65 (11 overs); Hazel Sanders 14; Joyce Currie 2/25 (5 overs)

England Women won by 5 wickets
Basin Reserve, Wellington
Umpires: Tony Ferrers (NZ) and Jack Loftus (NZ)

- Wellington Women won the toss and elected to bat.

==== 1-day match: Wanganui and Wellington vs England ====
9 December 1957
Scorecard

England; 9d/180 (59.5 overs)	v	Wanganui and Wellington; 101 (41.1 overs)
Polly Marshall 57; Gwen Sutherland 3/16 (8 overs)		Gwen Sutherland 60; Polly Marshall 4/4 (6.1 overs)

England Women won by 79 runs
Cooks Gardens, Wanganui
Umpires: Frank Gilligan (NZ) and Ina Lamason (NZ)

- England Women won the toss and elected to bat.

==== 2-day match: Auckland vs England ====
14, 16 December 1957
Scorecard

Auckland	v	England
80 (83.2 overs); Joyce Powell 34; Joan Wilkinson 3/9 (7 overs)		155 (67.5 overs); Polly Marshall 35; Joan Rich 4/41 (10 overs)
89 (84 overs); Carolyn Sinton 32; Mary Duggan 4/18 (21 overs)		1/15 (5.2 overs); Mary Duggan 11*; Maureen Taylor 1/12 (3 overs)

England Women won by 9 wickets
Melville Park, Auckland
Umpires: David Bindon (NZ) and Alf Jones (NZ)

- Auckland Women won the toss and elected to bat.

==== 1-day match: Matamata vs England ====
21 December 1957
Scorecard

Matamata; 81 (51.4 overs)	v	England; 191/9 (72 overs)
Joyce Powell 37; Helene Hegarty 4/25 (15.4 overs)		Joan Wilkinson 76; Anne Skinner 4/46 (29 overs)

England Women won by 7 wickets
Bedford Park, Matamata
Umpires: Rona McKenzie (NZ) and Joan Rich (NZ)

- Matamata Women won the toss and elected to bat.

==== 2-day match: New Zealand England Touring Team vs England ====
1–2 January 1958
Scorecard

England	v	New Zealand England Touring Team
7d/227 (81 overs); Josephine Batson 81; Rona McKenzie 3/33 (10 overs)		9d/210 (104.1 overs); Joyce Powell 85; Helene Hegarty 2/45 (26 overs)
3d/112 (84 overs); Cecilia Robinson 40*; Joyce Currie 2/34 (14 overs)		6/99 (23 overs); Phyl Blackler 39*; Polly Marshall 2/12 (2 overs)

Match drawn
Cornwall Park, Auckland
Umpires: Roy Blennerhassett (NZ) and Bill Sewell (NZ)

- England Women won the toss and elected to bat.

=== Test series ===
==== 1st Test ====
29, 30 November, 2 December 1957
Scorecard

New Zealand	v	England
223 (137.2 overs); Rona McKenzie 60; Mary Duggan 6/55 (40 overs)		7d/255 (106 overs); Mary Duggan 108; Jean Coulston 4/73 (31 overs)
7d/177 (115 overs); Evon Dickson 65; Dorothy Macfarlane 2/35 (33 overs)		4/48 (36 overs); Joan Wilkinson 11; Joyce Currie 3/36 (18 overs)

Match drawn
Lancaster Park, Christchurch
Umpires: Eric Milne (NZ) and WH Barnes (NZ)

- New Zealand Women won the toss and elected to bat.
- Edna Barker, Audrey Disbury, Dorothy Macfarlane, Ruth Westbrook (Eng) and Evon Dickson (NZ) all made their women's Test debuts.

==== 2nd Test ====
27, 28, 29 December 1957
Scorecard

England	v	New Zealand
186 (86.1 overs); Joan Wilkinson 90; Phyl Blackler 4/46 (17.1 overs)		130 (71.1 overs); Eris Paton 77*; Joan Hawes 4/36 (23.1 overs)
7d/171 (79 overs); Mary Duggan 85; Mary Webb 3/32 (15 overs)		9/203 (79 overs); Eris Paton 43; Mary Duggan 5/47 (28 overs)

Match drawn
Eden Park, Auckland

- England Women won the toss and elected to bat.
- Shirley Driscoll, Joan Hawes, Helen Sharpe (Eng) and Carolyn Sinton (NZ) all made their women's Test debuts.

== Tour of Australia ==
English women's cricket team in Australia in 1957–58
	Australia	England
- Dates: 11 January – 24 March 1958
Captains	Una Paisley	Mary Duggan; Cecilia Robinson (4th Test)

Test series
- Result: 4-match series drawn 0–0
Most runs	Betty Wilson (282)	Cecilia Robinson (256)
Most wickets	Betty Wilson (21)	Mary Duggan (9)

=== Tour matches ===
==== 1-day match: Bathurst vs England ====
11 January 1958
Scorecard

England	v	Bathurst
8d/179 (48.2 overs); Marjorie Holdsworth 51; M Rawlinson 3/53 (17 overs)		32 (20.3 overs); G Bradley 12; Joan Hawes 4/14 (7 overs)
		8/77 (27 overs) (f/o); A Long (27); Mary Duggan 5/23 (10 overs)

Match drawn
Bathurst Sportsground, Bathurst
Umpires: W Hadley (Aus) and C Stone (Aus)

- England Women won the toss and elected to bat.

==== 2-day match: Queensland vs England ====
17–18 January 1958
Scorecard

Queensland	v	England
66 (27.3 overs); D Byrne 28; Dorothy Macfarlane 4/20 (7 overs)		2d/253 (70 overs); Cecilia Robinson 105*; T Crouch 1/32 (8 overs)
74 (28.3 overs); V Beddington 11; Edna Barker 3/23 (6 overs)

England Women won by an innings and 113 runs
Athletic Oval, Toowoomba
Umpires: T Harvey (Aus) and J Sommerfield (Aus)

- Queensland Women won the toss and elected to bat.

==== 1-day match: Queensland vs England ====
18 January 1958
Scorecard

England; 323 (69.3 overs)	v	Queensland
Marjorie Holdsworth 70; Val Slater 3/35 (12 overs)

Match drawn
Athletic Oval, Toowoomba
Umpires: T Harvey (Aus) and J Sommerfield (Aus)

- England Women won the toss and elected to bat.

==== 1-day match: Brisbane vs England ====
22 January 1958
Scorecard

England; 5d/151 (47.4 overs)	v	Brisbane; 66 (58.3 overs)
Hazel Sanders 50*; H Doherty 3/21 (9 overs)		D Adams 30; Audrey Disbury 3/16 (10.3 overs)

England Women won by 85 runs
The Gabba, Brisbane
Umpires: T Harvey (Aus) and Reg Tickle (Aus)

- England Women won the toss and elected to bat.

==== 2-day match: Australian XI vs England ====
24–25 January 1958
Scorecard

Australian XI	v	England
133 (69.5 overs); Joyce Christ 40; Mary Duggan 4/28 (18.5 overs)		4d/171 (64 overs); Joan Wilkinson 46; J Coulthard 2/53 (14 overs)
58 (47.5 overs); Joyce Christ 14; Mary Duggan 2/11 (13 overs)		0/23 (6 overs); Shirley Driscoll 12*

England Women won by 10 wickets
The Gabba, Brisbane
Umpires: Col Hoy (Aus)

- Australian XI Women won the toss and elected to bat.

==== 1-day match: Metropolitan XI vs England ====
27 January 1958
Scorecard

England; 9d/186 (54.1 overs)	v	Metropolitan XI; 6/128 (65 overs)
Mary Duggan 52; Muriel Picton 3/40 (13 overs)		Joyce Christ 38*; Dorothy Macfarlane 3/33 (24 overs)

Match drawn
Grahame Park, Gosford

- England Women won the toss and elected to bat.

==== 2-day match: New South Wales vs England ====
31 January – 1 February 1958
Scorecard

New South Wales	v	England
107 (69.5 overs); Patricia Thomson 16; Edna Barker 5/28 (25 overs)		9d/114 (48.4 overs); Betty Birch 30; Hazel Buck 7/24 (16.4 overs)
1d/31 (17 overs); Mary Allitt 15; Joan Hawes 1/6 (7 overs)		1/25 (3.4 overs); Mary Duggan 11; Joyce Christ 1/8 (2 overs)

England Women won by 9 wickets
University Oval, Sydney
Umpires: Paul Berridge (Aus)

- England Women won the toss and elected to field.

==== 1-day match: New South Wales XI vs England ====
3 February 1958
Scorecard

England; 2d/169 (52 overs)	v	New South Wales XI; 126 (45.3 overs)
Josephine Batson 62*; S Collins 1/21 (12 overs)		Mollie Dive 46; Dorothy Macfarlane 4/31 (18 overs)

England Women won by 43 runs
Goulburn Sportsground, Goulburn
Umpires: O Bishop (Aus) and J Korff (Aus)

- England Women won the toss and elected to bat.

==== 2-day match: Victoria vs England ====
18–19 February 1958
Scorecard

England	v	(Victoria (state)) Victoria
4d/103 (54 overs); Betty Birch 31; Betty Wilson 2/10 (5 overs)		0/6 (8 overs); Nell Massey 4*

Match drawn
Junction Oval, Melbourne

- The result of the toss is unknown.
- There was no play on Day 2 due to rain.

==== 2-day match: South Australia vs England ====
28 February – 1 March 1958
Scorecard

England	v	South Australia
8d/176 (78 overs); Audrey Disbury 47*; Val Bungay 2/26 (15 overs)		45 (46.4 overs); Ruth Dow 18; Helene Hegarty 5/21 (20 overs)
		84 (53.4 overs); Barbara Orchard 21; Audrey Disbury 4/31 (17.4 overs)

England Women won by an innings and 47 runs
Vansittart Park, Mount Gambier
Umpires: M Burke (Aus) and J Ingham (Aus)

- England Women won the toss and elected to bat.

==== 1-day match: South Australia vs England ====
1 March 1958
Scorecard

England; 7/87 (41 overs)	v	South Australia
Shirley Driscoll 27; Ruth Dow 5/22 (14 overs)

Match drawn
Vansittart Park, Mount Gambier
Umpires: M Burke (Aus) and J Ingham (Aus)

- The result of the toss is unknown.

==== 1-day match: Western Australia vs England ====
17 March 1958
Scorecard

England; 4d/160 (52 overs)	v	Western Australia; 55 (47 overs)
Cecilia Robinson 45; Betty Newman 3/46 (18 overs)		P Mace 15; Joan Wilkinson 5/1 (7 overs)

England Women won by 105 runs
WACA Ground, Perth

- Western Australia Women won the toss and elected to field.

=== Test series ===
==== 1st Test ====
7, 8, 10 February 1958
Scorecard

Australia	v	England

Match abandoned
North Sydney Oval, Sydney

==== 2nd Test ====
21, 22, 24 February 1958
Scorecard

Australia	v	England
38 (43.5 overs); Betty Wilson 12; Mary Duggan 7/6 (14.5 overs)		35 (30.3 overs); Mary Duggan 12; Betty Wilson 7/7 (10.3 overs)
9d/202 (109.5 overs); Betty Wilson 100; Joan Hawes 3/32 (17.5 overs)		8/76 (64 overs); Shirley Driscoll 24; Betty Wilson 4/9 (19 overs)

Match drawn
Junction Oval, Melbourne

- England Women won the toss and elected to field.
- No play was possible on Day 1 due to rain.
- Faith Coulthard, Joyce Dalton and Nell Massey (Aus) all made their women's Test debut.
- Betty Wilson (Aus) became the first bowler to take a hat-trick in women's Test cricket.
- Wilson became the first Test player (man or woman) to score a century and take ten wickets in a match.
- Both Australia and England scored their lowest first innings total.

==== 3rd Test ====
8, 10, 11 March 1958
Scorecard

Australia	v	England
292 (159.3 overs); Betty Wilson 127; Helene Hegarty 4/70 (46.3 overs)		325 (192.4 overs); Cecilia Robinson 102; Betty Wilson 6/71 (49 overs)
2/78 (59 overs); Ruth Dow 30*; Helene Hegarty 1/12 (10 overs)

Match drawn
Adelaide Oval, Adelaide
Umpires: Arthur Cocks (Aus) and John McMenamin (Aus)

- Australia Women won the toss and elected to bat.
- Marjorie Marvell (Aus) and Josephine Batson (Eng) both made their women's Test debut.

==== 4th Test ====
21, 22, 24 March 1958
Scorecard

England	v	Australia
6d/253 (121 overs); Betty Birch 72*; Joyce Bath 2/41 (24 overs)		7d/280 (137 overs); Valma Batty 70; Joan Hawes 2/54 (27 overs)
188 (102.5 overs); Cecilia Robinson 96*; Joyce Bath 3/11 (8 overs)		1/59 (21 overs); Nell Massey 40*

Match drawn
WACA Ground, Perth
Umpires: Jack Gillott (Aus) and Stanley McDonald (Aus)

- England Women won the toss and elected to bat.
- Marie McDonough (Aus) made her women's Test debut.
- Cecilia Robinson (Eng) was the first batter to carry the bat in women's Test cricket.
