= List of women's international cricket hat-tricks =

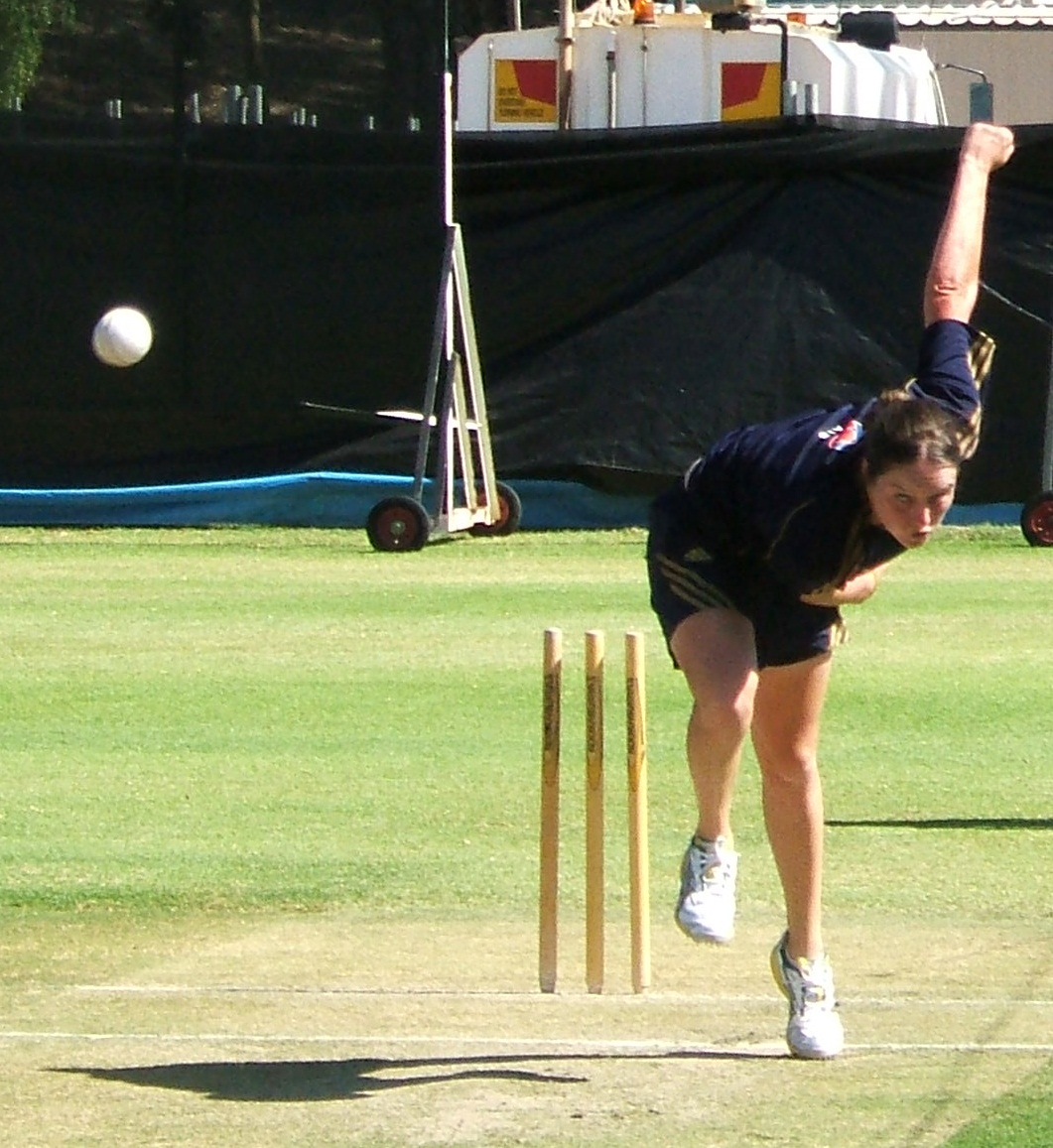
Rene Farrell is the most recent bowler to have taken a hat-trick in a women's Test match.

A hat-trick in cricket is when a bowler takes three wickets from consecutive deliveries. It is a relatively rare feat in women's international cricket. (Note: Test, One Day Internationals, and Twenty20 Internationals.) The first hat-trick was taken in a Test match between Australia and England in February 1958, by Australia's Betty Wilson. Two further hat-tricks have been taken in women's Tests; by Pakistan's Shaiza Khan in 2004, and Australia's Rene Farrell in 2011. The first hat-trick in women's One Day Internationals was taken by Carole Hodges during the 1993 Women's Cricket World Cup.

In September 2019, against the West Indies, Megan Schutt became the first female bowler to take two hat-tricks in international cricket.

The most recent bowler to achieve the feat was New Zealand's Amelia Kerr, against Zimbabwe during a Women's One Day International (WODI) in March 2026.

== Key ==
| Notation | Meaning |
|---|---|
| Inn. | The innings of the match in which the player took her hat-trick. |
| Dismissals | The three players dismissed by the bowler, with the method of dismissal in parentheses. |
| Date | The date on which the match began. |
| * | The match was part of the Women's Cricket World Cup or the ICC Women's World Twenty20. |
| ^{S} | The hat-trick was split over two overs. |

| Notation | Meaning |
|---|---|
| b | Bowled |
| lbw | Leg before wicket |
| c & b | Caught, by the bowler |
| c Player | Caught, by the fielder noted |
| c sub | Caught, by a substitute fielder |
| st Player | Stumped, by the fielder noted |
| † | Indicates that the noted fielder is the designated wicket-keeper |

== Hat-tricks ==
=== Tests ===
Women's Test cricket hat-tricks
| No. | Bowler | For | Against | Inn. | Match | Dismissals | Venue | Date | Ref. |
|---|---|---|---|---|---|---|---|---|---|
| 1 | Betty Wilson | Australia | England | 2 | 2/4 | Edna Barker (b); Joan Hawes (st †Nell Massey); Dorothy Macfarlane (lbw) | (Australia) St Kilda Cricket Club Ground, Melbourne | 21 February 1958 | |
| 2 | Shaiza Khan ^{S} | Pakistan | West Indies | 2 | 1/1 | Verena Felicien (c Nazia Nazir); Doris Francis (b); Stephanie Power (c Sadia Butt) | (Pakistan) National Stadium, Karachi | 15 March 2004 | |
| 3 | Rene Farrell | Australia | England | 3 | 1/1 | Charlotte Edwards (lbw); Katherine Brunt (b); Danielle Hazell (lbw) | (Australia) Bankstown Oval, Sydney | 22 January 2011 | |

=== One Day Internationals ===
Women's One Day International cricket hat-tricks
| No. | Bowler | For | Against | Inn. | Dismissals | Venue | Date | Ref. |
|---|---|---|---|---|---|---|---|---|
| 1 | Carole Hodges | England | Denmark | 2 | Susanne Nielsen (c Karen Smithies); Pia Thomsen (c Barbara Daniels); Heidi Kjaer (c Gill Smith) | (England) Recreation Ground, Banstead | 20 July 1993* | |
| 2 | Julie Harris | New Zealand | West Indies | 1 | Eugena Gregg (lbw); Cherry-Ann Singh (lbw); Patricia Felicien (lbw) | (England) Civil Service Sports Ground, Chiswick | 26 July 1993* | |
| 3 | Emily Drumm | New Zealand | Australia | 1 | Zoe Goss (c †Sarah Illingworth); Jo Garey (lbw); Joanne Broadbent (st †Sarah Illingworth) | (Australia) Adelaide Oval, Adelaide | 3 February 1996 | |
| 4 | Clare Connor | England | India | 1 | Rupi Shastri (b); Hemlata Kala (c Lucy Pearson); Anjum Chopra (c Laura Newton) | (England) County Ground, Northampton | 9 July 1999 | |
| 5 | Saibh Young | Ireland | England | 2 | Laura Harper (c Barbara McDonald); Ebony Rainford-Brent (b); Sarah Clarke (b) | (England) Bradfield College, Reading | 12 August 2001 | |
| 6 | Lotte Egging | Netherlands | Pakistan | 1 | Asmavia Iqbal (lbw); Qanita Jalil (b); Sadia Yousuf (c Helmien Rambaldo) | (South Africa) University No 2 Ground, Stellenbosch | 22 February 2008 | |
| 7 | Dane van Niekerk ^{1} | South Africa | West Indies | 2 | Shaquana Quintyne (b); Anisa Mohammed (b); Tremayne Smartt (lbw) | (Saint Kitts and Nevis) Warner Park, Basseterre | 7 January 2013 | |
| 8 | Inoka Ranaweera | Sri Lanka | New Zealand | 1 | Anna Peterson (b); Erin Bermingham (c Nilakshi de Silva); Lea Tahuhu (c Ama Kanchana) | (New Zealand) Bert Sutcliffe Oval, Lincoln | 3 November 2015 | |
| 9 | Rumana Ahmed | Bangladesh | Ireland | 2 | Kim Garth (lbw); Clare Shillington (lbw); Mary Waldron (lbw) | (Northern Ireland) Shaw's Bridge Lower Ground, Belfast | 10 September 2016 | |
| 10 | Masabata Klaas | South Africa | Pakistan | 1 | Aliya Riaz (c Shabnim Ismail); Omaima Sohail (c †Sinalo Jafta); Sidra Nawaz (c †Sinalo Jafta) | (South Africa) Senwes Park, Potchefstroom | 9 May 2019 | |
| 11 | Megan Schutt | Australia | West Indies | 1 | Chinelle Henry (b); Karishma Ramharack (c Ellyse Perry); Afy Fletcher (b) | (Cricket West Indies) Sir Vivian Richards Stadium, Antigua | 11 September 2019 | |
| 12 | Charlie Dean | England | South Africa | 1 | Marizanne Kapp (c Sophie Ecclestone); Nadine de Klerk (c Heather Knight); Sinalo Jafta (lbw) | (South Africa) Kingsmead Cricket Ground, Durban | 8 December 2024 | |
| 13 | Chloe Tryon | South Africa | Sri Lanka | 2 | Dewmi Vihanga (c Nadine de Klerk); Sugandika Kumari (c Nadine de Klerk); Malki Madara (c †Sinalo Jafta) | (Sri Lanka) R. Premadasa Stadium, Colombo | 9 May 2025 | |
| 14 | Amelia Kerr | New Zealand | Zimbabwe | 2 | Adel Zimunu (b); Audrey Mazvishaya (lbw); Tendai Makusha (b) | (New Zealand) University of Otago Oval, Dunedin | 11 March 2026 | |

^{1} Dane van Niekerk took 4 wickets in 5 balls during this spell. She dismissed Shemaine Campbelle (st †Trisha Chetty) and bowled a dot ball before she took the hat-trick.

=== Twenty20 Internationals ===
As of June 2026, 62 hat-tricks have been taken in over 2,800 WT20I matches.

== See also ==
- List of Test cricket hat-tricks
- List of One Day International cricket hat-tricks
