= Margaret Lockwood (disambiguation) =

Margaret Lockwood may refer to:

- Margaret Lockwood (1916–1990), British actress
- Margaret Lockwood (badminton) (born 1952), badminton player from England
- Margaret Lockwood (cricketer) (1911–1999), cricketer from England
- Margaret Lockwood (bowls), England international lawn bowler
