= David Stead =

David Stead may refer to:

- David George Stead (1877–1957), Australian marine biologist, conservationist and writer
- David Stead (cricketer) (born 1947), New Zealand cricketer
