= Betty Maker =

New Zealand cricketer

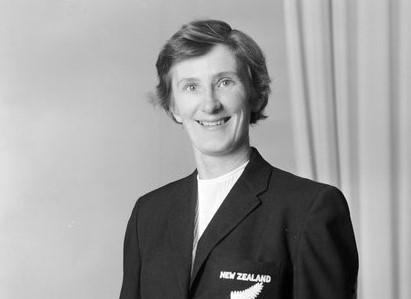
- Maker in 1966

Personal information
- Full name: Betty Jean Maker
- Born: 10 December 1925; Melbourne, Victoria, Australia
- Died: 2 February 2004 (aged 78); Wellington, New Zealand
- Batting: Left-handed
- Bowling: Left-arm medium
- Role: All-rounder

International information
- National side: New Zealand (1966)
- Test debut (cap 49): 18 June 1966 v England
- Last Test: 6 August 1966 v England

Domestic team information
- Years: Team
- 1952/53–1956/57: Victoria
- 1959/60–1970/71: Wellington

Career statistics
Competition	WTest	WFC
Matches	3	60
Runs scored	10	805
Batting average	2.50	11.66
100s/50s	0/0	0/2
Top score	5	85
Balls bowled	384	5,797
Wickets	5	125
Bowling average	31.20	15.20
5 wickets in innings	0	4
10 wickets in match	0	1
Best bowling	3/34	7/25
Catches/stumpings	1/–	23/–
- Source: CricketArchive, 22 November 2021

Betty Jean Maker (10 December 1925 – 2 February 2004) was an Australian-born New Zealand cricketer who played as an all-rounder, batting left-handed and bowling left-arm medium. She appeared in three Test matches for New Zealand in 1966. She played domestic cricket for Victoria and Wellington.
