= Pat Moore (cricketer) =

New Zealand cricketer (born 1930)

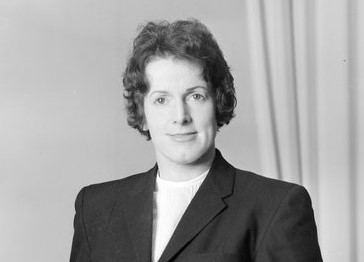
- Moore in 1966

Personal information
- Full name: Patricia Nellie Moore
- Born: 13 August 1930 (age 96); Christchurch, New Zealand
- Batting: Left-handed
- Bowling: Right-arm medium
- Role: All-rounder

International information
- National side: New Zealand (1961–1966)
- Test debut (cap 42): 17 March 1961 v Australia
- Last Test: 6 August 1966 v England

Domestic team information
- Years: Team
- 1947/48–1967/68: Canterbury

Career statistics
Competition	WTest	WFC
Matches	2	74
Runs scored	80	2,771
Batting average	40.00	29.79
100s/50s	0/0	6/12
Top score	47*	143
Balls bowled	54	7,332
Wickets	0	170
Bowling average	–	15.56
5 wickets in innings	0	8
10 wickets in match	0	1
Best bowling	–	6/14
Catches/stumpings	3/–	38/–
- Source: CricketArchive, 23 November 2021

Patricia Nellie Moore (born 13 August 1930) is a New Zealand former cricketer who played as an all-rounder, batting left-handed and bowling right-arm medium. She appeared in two Test matches for New Zealand, one in 1961 and one in 1966. She played domestic cricket for Canterbury.
