= Elaine White =

New Zealand cricketer (born 1944)

Personal information
- Full name: Elaine Grace White
- Born: 9 July 1944 (age 82); Auckland, New Zealand
- Batting: Right-handed
- Bowling: Right-arm medium
- Role: All-rounder

International information
- National side: New Zealand (1972)
- Test debut (cap 61): 5 February 1972 v Australia
- Last Test: 24 March 1972 v South Africa

Domestic team information
- Years: Team
- 1964/65–1967/68: Auckland
- 1968/69–1972/73: North Shore

Career statistics
Competition	WTest	WFC
Matches	3	37
Runs scored	33	620
Batting average	6.60	18.78
100s/50s	0/0	0/4
Top score	17	68
Balls bowled	326	2,647
Wickets	2	49
Bowling average	42.50	17.91
5 wickets in innings	0	0
10 wickets in match	0	0
Best bowling	1/5	4/1
Catches/stumpings	0/–	20/–
- Source: CricketArchive, 21 November 2021

Elaine Grace White (born 9 July 1944) is a New Zealand former cricketer who played as an all-rounder, batting right-handed and bowling right-arm medium. She appeared in three Test matches for New Zealand in 1972. She played domestic cricket for Auckland and North Shore.
