= Rosemary Goodchild =

English cricketer

Personal information
- Full name: Rosemary P Goodchild
- Born: 1936 (age 89–90); London, England
- Role: Bowler

International information
- National side: England (1966)
- Only Test (cap 69): 6 August 1966 v New Zealand

Domestic team information
- Years: Team
- 1956–1958: Yorkshire
- 1959–1960: Warwickshire
- 1961–1970: Buckinghamshire
- 1972–1982: Thames Valley

Career statistics
Competition	WTest	WFC	WLA
Matches	1	8	2
Runs scored	1	65	4
Batting average	1.00	8.12	2.00
100s/50s	0/0	0/0	0/0
Top score	1	30*	4
Balls bowled	162	1,228	132
Wickets	2	23	3
Bowling average	24.00	18.52	6.66
5 wickets in innings	0	1	0
10 wickets in match	0	0	–
Best bowling	2/40	6/46	2/7
Catches/stumpings	0/–	5/–	0/–
- Source: CricketArchive, 4 March 2021

Rosemary P Goodchild (born 1936) is an English former cricketer who played primarily as a pace bowler. She appeared in one Test match for England in 1966. She played domestic cricket for Yorkshire, Warwickshire, Buckinghamshire and Thames Valley.

During her one test match, played against New Zealand, Goodchild opened the bowling alongside June Stephenson in both innings, and took two wickets. She batted at number ten for England, and was unbeaten without scoring in the first innings, and made one run in the second innings. The match was drawn.
