= Ruth Dow =

Australian cricketer

Cricket information
- Batting: Right-handed
- Bowling: Right-arm

International information
- National side: Australia
- Test debut (cap 39): 18 January 1957 v New Zealand
- Last Test: 8 March 1958 v England

Career statistics
Competition	WTest
Matches	3
Runs scored	120
Batting average	30.00
100s/50s	0/1
Top score	58
Balls bowled	696
Wickets	10
Bowling average	11.42
5 wickets in innings	0
10 wickets in match	0
Best bowling	5/39
Catches/stumpings	2/–
- Source: Cricinfo, 26 February 2015

Lorna Ruth Dow (28 June 1926 – 1989) was an Australian cricketer. Dow's Test debut was against New Zealand in January 1957. She played three Test matches for the Australia national women's cricket team.
