= David Stead (cricketer) =

New Zealand cricketer (born 1947)

Personal information
- Full name: David William Stead
- Born: 26 May 1947 (age 79); Christchurch, New Zealand
- Batting: Right-handed
- Bowling: Right-arm medium Right-arm leg-spin
- Relatives: Gary Stead (son); Janice Stead (sister)

Domestic team information
- Years: Team
- 1968/69–1985/86: Canterbury

Career statistics
Competition	First-class	List A
Matches	80	43
Runs scored	3,205	564
Batting average	25.03	16.58
100s/50s	1/20	0/2
Top score	193*	67*
Balls bowled	11,505	1,614
Wickets	170	57
Bowling average	29.78	21.02
5 wickets in innings	6	0
10 wickets in match	0	0
Best bowling	7/99	3/24
Catches/stumpings	69/0	9/0
- Source: Cricinfo, 18 August 2018

David William Stead (born 26 May 1947) is a former New Zealand cricketer who played first-class cricket for Canterbury from 1969 to 1986.

A right-handed batsman and right-arm medium-pace and leg-spin bowler, Stead had his most successful season with the bat in 1980/81, when he made 479 runs at an average of 43.54, including his only century, 193 not out against Central Districts. He also took 6 for 79 in the first innings of the same match, but Central Districts won by three wickets. His best figures in first-class cricket were 7 for 99 against Otago in 1982–83, when Canterbury nevertheless lost by an innings.

His son Gary played Test cricket for New Zealand in 1999 and was appointed coach of the national team in August 2018. David's elder sister Janice also played cricket for New Zealand.
