= Glenys Page =

New Zealand cricketer

Personal information
- Full name: Glenys Lynne Page
- Born: 11 August 1940; Auckland, New Zealand
- Died: 7 November 2012 (aged 72); Auckland, New Zealand
- Batting: Right handed
- Bowling: Slow left-arm orthodox
- Role: Bowler

International information
- National side: New Zealand (1973)
- ODI debut (cap 8): 23 June 1973 v Trinidad and Tobago
- Last ODI: 21 July 1973 v Young England

Domestic team information
- Years: Team
- 1965/66–1981/82: Auckland

Career statistics
| Competition | WODI | WFC | WLA |
|---|---|---|---|
| Matches | 2 | 64 | 16 |
| Runs scored | 5 | 616 | 96 |
| Batting average | 5.00 | 10.80 | 10.66 |
| 100s/50s | 0/0 | 0/1 | 0/0 |
| Top score | 5 | 51 | 23 |
| Balls bowled | 104 | 9,165 | 848 |
| Wickets | 6 | 232 | 26 |
| Bowling average | 7.66 | 14.52 | 13.00 |
| 5 wickets in innings | 1 | 14 | 1 |
| 10 wickets in match | 0 | 3 | 0 |
| Best bowling | 6/20 | 8/54 | 6/20 |
| Catches/stumpings | 0/– | 32/– | 1/– |
- Source: CricketArchive, 14 November 2021

Glenys Lynne Page (11 August 1940 – 7 November 2012) was a New Zealand cricketer who played as a slow left-arm orthodox bowler. She appeared in two One Day Internationals for New Zealand, both at the 1973 World Cup. She played domestic cricket for Auckland.

Page made her debut in New Zealand's inaugural ODI match, against Trinidad and Tobago, in which she took six wickets for twenty runs – the best bowling figures by a player on debut in a WODI, and the only bowler to take a six-wicket haul on WODI debut.

She held the record for best bowling figures by a New Zealander in WODIs from 1973 to 1982, surpassed by Jackie Lord's performance of 6/10 against India at the 1982 Women's Cricket World Cup.

Page died in Auckland on 7 November 2012, aged 72.
