= Liz Allan (cricketer) =

New Zealand cricketer (born 1948)

Personal information
- Full name: Elizabeth Patricia Norris Allan
- Born: 6 November 1948 (age 78); Auckland, New Zealand
- Batting: Right-handed
- Bowling: Right-arm medium
- Role: Bowler

International information
- National side: New Zealand (1972–1978)
- Test debut (cap 59): 5 February 1972 v Australia
- Last Test: 8 January 1977 v India
- ODI debut (cap 12): 30 June 1973 v International XI
- Last ODI: 8 January 1978 v England

Domestic team information
- Years: Team
- 1966/67–1978/79: North Shore

Career statistics
Competition	WTest	WODI	WFC	WLA
Matches	4	7	45	9
Runs scored	87	42	614	62
Batting average	43.50	8.40	21.17	10.33
100s/50s	0/0	0/0	0/2	0/0
Top score	29*	17	61*	17
Balls bowled	536	354	3,386	469
Wickets	5	3	43	7
Bowling average	27.60	54.00	25.09	29.71
5 wickets in innings	0	0	0	0
10 wickets in match	0	0	0	0
Best bowling	3/38	1/22	4/21	2/20
Catches/stumpings	1/–	2/–	28/–	5/–
- Source: CricketArchive, 14 November 2021

Elizabeth Patricia Norris Allan (born 6 November 1948) is a New Zealand former cricketer who played primarily as a right-arm medium bowler. She appeared in 4 Test matches and 7 One Day Internationals for New Zealand between 1972 and 1978. She played domestic cricket for North Shore.
