= Gary Stead =

New Zealand cricketer

Personal information
- Full name: Gary Raymond Stead
- Born: 9 January 1972 (age 54); Christchurch, New Zealand
- Batting: Right-handed
- Bowling: Legbreak
- Relatives: David Stead (father); Janice Stead (aunt)

International information
- National side: New Zealand (1999)
- Test debut (cap 207): 11 March 1999 v South Africa
- Last Test: 26 December 1999 v West Indies

Head coaching information
- Years: Team
- 2018–2025: New Zealand

Career statistics
Competition	Test	FC	LA
Matches	5	101	103
Runs scored	278	4,984	2,173
Batting average	34.75	32.15	27.85
100s/50s	0/2	10/24	2/10
Top score	78	190	101*
Balls bowled	6	1,053	48
Wickets	0	9	1
Bowling average	–	65.22	43.00
5 wickets in innings	–	0	0
10 wickets in match	–	0	0
Best bowling	–	4/58	1/20
Catches/stumpings	2/–	46/–	37/–
Medal record
Men's Cricket
Representing New Zealand (as coach)
ICC Cricket World Cup
Runner-up	2019 England and Wales
ICC World Test Championship
Winner	2019–2021
ICC Men's T20 World Cup
Runner-up	2021 UAE and Oman
Champions Trophy
Runner-up	2025 Pakistan & UAE
- Source: Cricinfo, 1 May 2017

Gary Raymond Stead (born 9 January 1972) is a New Zealand cricket coach and former cricketer. He was the head coach of the New Zealand cricket team from August 2018 to June 2025, and coached the New Zealand squad to the 2019–2021 ICC World Test Championship, New Zealand's first International Cricket Council (ICC) trophy since the KnockOut Trophy in 2000.

A top-order batsman, Stead played five Tests in nine months in 1999, averaging 34.75 and never being dismissed in single figures. Against South Africa he showed his great character at Wellington, scoring 68 and 33, but after two mediocre performances against West Indies he was dropped. His Test call-up had come after eight years of first-class cricket with Canterbury, and he led them for five seasons from 1998–99 in a period when they struggled.

After he finished playing, he took up coaching and became coach of the successful New Zealand women's team. In August 2018, New Zealand Cricket appointed Stead coach of the New Zealand men's team, succeeding Mike Hesson.

After New Zealand's loss in a Super over against England in the 2019 World Cup, Stead criticised the decision of the ICC to go to a tie break and raised the idea of sharing the World Cup Trophy.

On 4 June 2025, Stead stepped down as New Zealand coach after seven years in the role. He had suggested remaining in the role as Test coach, but New Zealand Cricket opted to appoint a single coach across all formats, replacing Stead with Rob Walter. In September 2025 Stead returned to New Zealand Cricket as their high-performance coach.
