= Eileen Vigor =

English cricketer

Personal information
- Full name: Eileen R Vigor
- Born: 1935 (age 90–91); Bermondsey, Surrey, England
- Bowling: Right-arm off break
- Role: Bowler

International information
- National side: England (1963–1966)
- Test debut (cap 64): 15 June 1963 v Australia
- Last Test: 6 August 1966 v New Zealand

Domestic team information
- Years: Team
- 1960–1966: Surrey

Career statistics
Competition	WTest	WFC
Matches	5	11
Runs scored	23	38
Batting average	11.50	9.50
100s/50s	0/0	0/0
Top score	16*	16*
Balls bowled	1,204	1,925
Wickets	13	25
Bowling average	20.46	19.16
5 wickets in innings	0	0
10 wickets in match	0	0
Best bowling	3/24	4/25
Catches/stumpings	4/–	7/–
- Source: CricketArchive, 6 March 2021

Eileen Vigor (née Rump; born 1935) is an English former cricketer and international lawn bowler. She played as a right-arm off break bowler, and played in five test matches for the England women's cricket team between 1963 and 1966. She played domestic cricket for Surrey. Vigor also played for the England bowls team, and took part in the 1991 World Indoor Bowls Championship.
