= Evon Dickson =

New Zealand cricketer

Personal information
- Full name: Evon Joan Dickson
- Born: 11 September 1934; Christchurch, New Zealand
- Died: 16 August 2012 (aged 77); Christchurch, New Zealand
- Batting: Right-handed
- Bowling: Right-arm medium
- Role: Batter

International information
- National side: New Zealand (1957)
- Test debut (cap 39): 29 November 1957 v England
- Last Test: 27 December 1957 v England

Domestic team information
- Years: Team
- 1949/50–1960/61: Canterbury

Career statistics
Competition	WTest	WFC
Matches	2	34
Runs scored	114	734
Batting average	28.50	14.68
100s/50s	0/1	0/3
Top score	65	65
Balls bowled	–	42
Wickets	–	0
Bowling average	–	–
5 wickets in innings	–	0
10 wickets in match	–	0
Best bowling	–	–
Catches/stumpings	0/–	8/6
- Source: CricketArchive, 23 November 2021

Evon Joan Fraser (née Dickson; 11 September 1934 – 16 August 2012) was a New Zealand cricketer who played as a right-handed batter. She appeared in two Test matches for New Zealand in 1957. She played domestic cricket for Canterbury.
