= Carolyn Sinton =

New Zealand cricketer (born 1938)

Personal information
- Full name: Carolyn Marie Sinton
- Born: 23 January 1938 (age 88); Auckland, New Zealand
- Batting: Right-handed
- Role: Batter

International information
- National side: New Zealand (1957)
- Only Test (cap 40): 27 December 1957 v England

Domestic team information
- Years: Team
- 1954/55–1957/58: Auckland

Career statistics
| Competition | WTest | WFC |
|---|---|---|
| Matches | 1 | 12 |
| Runs scored | 14 | 208 |
| Batting average | 7.00 | 14.85 |
| 100s/50s | 0/0 | 0/1 |
| Top score | 10 | 60 |
| Catches/stumpings | 0/– | 4/– |
- Source: CricketArchive, 23 November 2021

Carolyn Marie Sinton (born 23 January 1938) is a New Zealand former cricketer who played as a right-handed batter. She appeared in one Test match for New Zealand, against England, in 1957. She played domestic cricket for Auckland.
