= Mary Webb (cricketer) =

New Zealand cricketer

Personal information
- Full name: Mary Averil Webb
- Born: 9 April 1936 (age 90); Dunedin, New Zealand
- Batting: Right-handed
- Bowling: Right-arm off break
- Role: All-rounder

International information
- National side: New Zealand (1957–1961)
- Test debut (cap 38): 18 January 1957 v Australia
- Last Test: 17 March 1961 v Australia

Domestic team information
- Years: Team
- 1951/52–1960/61: Otago

Career statistics
Competition	WTest	WFC
Matches	4	31
Runs scored	110	1,290
Batting average	13.75	25.80
100s/50s	0/0	0/9
Top score	42	94
Balls bowled	186	1,398
Wickets	6	31
Bowling average	11.00	22.16
5 wickets in innings	0	0
10 wickets in match	0	0
Best bowling	3/32	3/30
Catches/stumpings	0/–	19/3
- Source: CricketArchive, 25 November 2021

Mary Averil Webb (née Speight; born 9 April 1936) is a New Zealand former cricketer who played as a right-handed batter, right-arm off break bowler and occasional wicket-keeper. Making her Test debut against Australia in 1957, She appeared in four Test matches for New Zealand between 1957 and 1961. She played domestic cricket for Otago.
