= Dawn Rae =

Australia cricketer (born 1941)

Personal information
- Full name: Dawn Lillian Rae
- Born: 4 January 1941 (age 85); North Fitzroy, Melbourne, Australia
- Batting: Right-handed
- Bowling: Right-arm off break Right-arm medium
- Role: Batter

International information
- National side: Australia (1972–1973)
- Only Test (cap 70): 5 February 1972 v New Zealand
- ODI debut (cap 9): 23 June 1973 v Young England
- Last ODI: 11 July 1973 v Jamaica

Domestic team information
- Years: Team
- 1961/62–1972/73: Victoria

Career statistics
Competition	WTest	WODI	WFC	WLA
Matches	1	4	13	14
Runs scored	53	16	750	402
Batting average	26.50	4.00	50.00	33.50
100s/50s	0/0	0/0	2/4	1/2
Top score	38	10	115	125*
Balls bowled	153	–	288	180
Wickets	1	–	5	2
Bowling average	26.00	–	10.00	42.50
5 wickets in innings	0	–	0	0
10 wickets in match	0	–	0	0
Best bowling	1/26	–	3/9	1/5
Catches/stumpings	1/–	3/–	3/–	3/–
- Source: CricketArchive, 16 November 2023

Dawn Lillian Rae (née Adams; born 4 January 1941) is an Australian former cricketer who played primarily as a right-handed batter. She appeared in one Test match and four One Day Internationals for Australia in 1972 and 1973. She played domestic cricket for Victoria.
