= Gwen Sutherland =

New Zealand cricketer

Personal information
- Full name: Gwendoline Anne Sutherland
- Born: 1921; Perth, Australia
- Died: 1995 (aged 73–74); Australia
- Batting: Right-handed
- Bowling: Right-arm off break
- Role: All-rounder

International information
- National side: New Zealand (1957)
- Test debut (cap 36): 18 January 1957 v Australia
- Last Test: 27 December 1957 v England

Domestic team information
- Years: Team
- 1950/51–1957/58: Wellington

Career statistics
Competition	WTest	WFC
Matches	3	26
Runs scored	66	500
Batting average	11.00	15.15
100s/50s	0/0	0/0
Top score	22	48
Balls bowled	288	1,949
Wickets	2	43
Bowling average	43.00	13.92
5 wickets in innings	0	2
10 wickets in match	0	0
Best bowling	1/29	6/63
Catches/stumpings	1/–	13/–
- Source: CricketArchive, 12 October 2021

Gwendoline Anne Sutherland (1921–1995) was a New Zealand cricketer who played as a right-arm off break bowler and right-handed batter. Having made her Test debut against Australia in 1957, she played in three Test matches for New Zealand in 1957. She played domestic cricket for Wellington.
