= Carol Oyler =

New Zealand cricketer (born 1947)

Personal information
- Full name: Carol Mary Oyler
- Born: 12 August 1947 (age 79); Auckland, New Zealand
- Batting: Right-handed
- Bowling: Right-arm medium
- Role: Batter

International information
- National side: New Zealand (1966–1969)
- Test debut (cap 50): 18 June 1966 v England
- Last Test: 7 March 1969 v England

Domestic team information
- Years: Team
- 1965/66–1968/69: North Shore

Career statistics
Competition	WTest	WFC
Matches	5	26
Runs scored	212	899
Batting average	35.33	27.24
100s/50s	0/1	0/4
Top score	67*	98
Balls bowled	–	60
Wickets	–	0
Bowling average	–	–
5 wickets in innings	–	0
10 wickets in match	–	0
Best bowling	–	–
Catches/stumpings	2/–	5/–
- Source: CricketArchive, 22 November 2021

Carol Mary Oyler (born 12 August 1947) is a New Zealand former cricketer who played as a right-handed batter. She appeared in five Test matches for New Zealand between 1966 and 1969. She played domestic cricket for North Shore.
