= Janice Stead =

New Zealand cricketer (born 1939)

Janice Stead MNZM
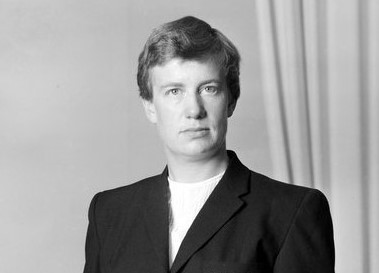
- Stead in 1966

Personal information
- Full name: Janice Ellen Stead
- Born: 1 November 1939 (age 87); Christchurch, New Zealand
- Batting: Right-handed
- Role: Batter
- Relatives: David Stead (brother); Gary Stead (nephew); Wayne Stead (nephew)

International information
- National side: New Zealand (1966–1972)
- Test debut (cap 52): 18 June 1966 v England
- Last Test: 24 March 1972 v South Africa

Domestic team information
- Years: Team
- 1958/59–1971/72: Canterbury

Career statistics
Competition	WTest	WFC
Matches	9	61
Runs scored	433	2,325
Batting average	27.06	25.27
100s/50s	0/3	0/12
Top score	95	95
Catches/stumpings	3/–	34/–
- Source: CricketArchive, 22 November 2021

Janice Ellen Stead MNZM (born 1 November 1939) is a New Zealand former cricketer who played as a right-handed batter. She appeared in nine Test matches for New Zealand between 1966 and 1972, with a high score of 95, scored against Australia in 1972. She played domestic cricket for Canterbury.

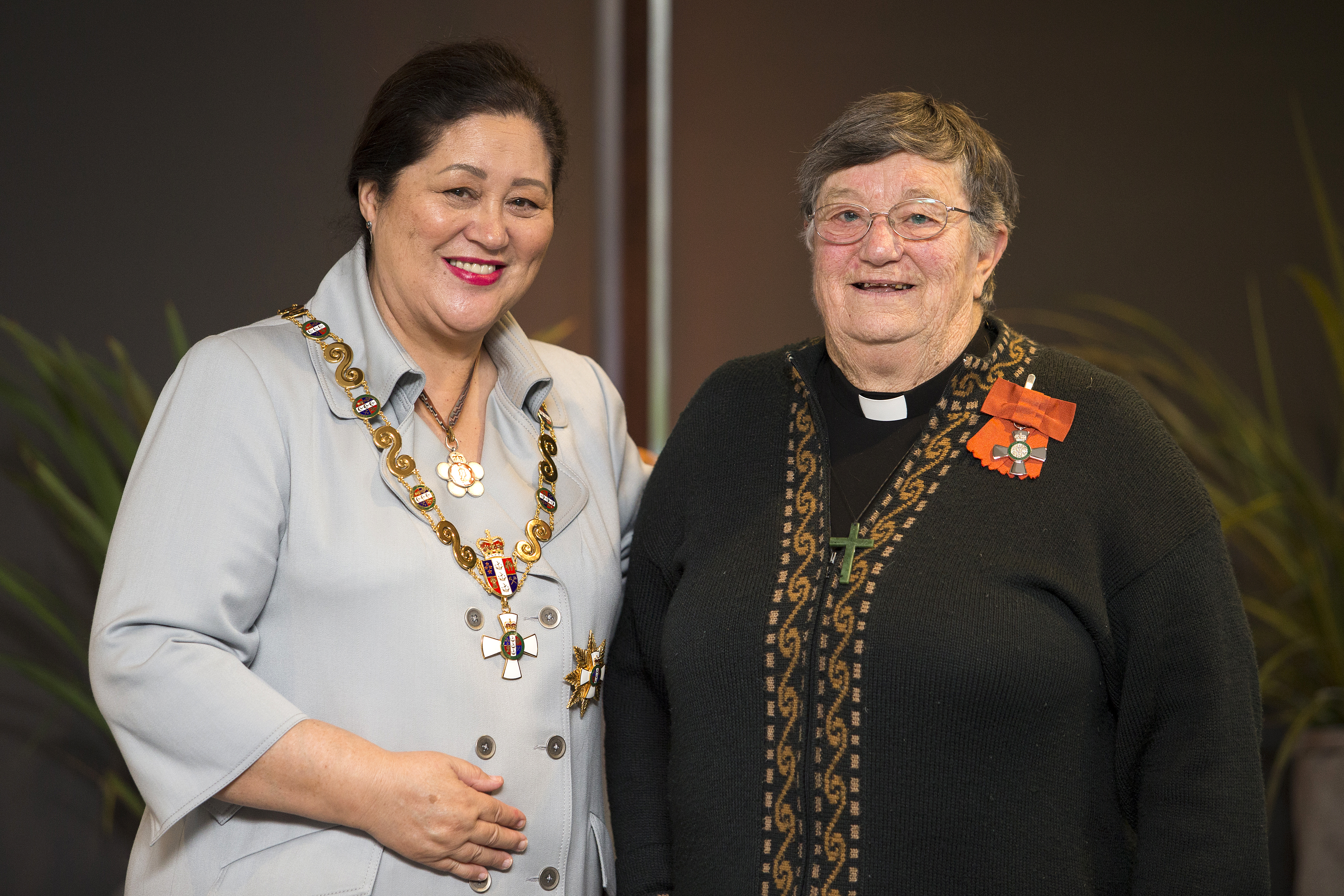
Stead (right), after her investiture as a Member of the New Zealand Order of Merit by the governor-general, Dame Cindy Kiro, at Christchurch Town Hall on 7 July 2022

In the 2021 Birthday Honours, Stead was appointed a Member of the New Zealand Order of Merit, for services to sport and the community.
