= Polly Marshall =

English cricketer

Personal information
- Full name: Olive Mary Marshall
- Born: 17 May 1932; Pickering, Yorkshire, England
- Died: March 1995 (aged 62); Kingston upon Hull, England
- Batting: Right-handed
- Bowling: Right-arm medium
- Role: All-rounder

International information
- National side: England (1954–1966)
- Test debut (cap 42): 24 July 1954 v New Zealand
- Last Test: 6 August 1966 v New Zealand

Domestic team information
- Years: Team
- 1954–1967: Yorkshire

Career statistics
Competition	WTest	WFC
Matches	13	38
Runs scored	378	870
Batting average	22.23	21.75
100s/50s	0/3	0/4
Top score	81	93*
Balls bowled	1,056	2,279
Wickets	11	32
Bowling average	22.18	18.84
5 wickets in innings	0	0
10 wickets in match	0	0
Best bowling	3/14	3/14
Catches/stumpings	2/–	12/–
- Source: CricketArchive, 9 March 2021

Olive Mary "Polly" Marshall (17 May 1932 – March 1995) was an English cricketer who played, as a right-handed batter and right-arm medium bowler. She appeared in 13 Test matches for England between 1954 and 1966. She played domestic cricket for Yorkshire for 14 years.
