= Joan Hawes =

English cricketer (1933–2019)

Personal information
- Full name: Joan Lillian Hawes
- Born: 18 November 1933; Lambeth, Surrey, England
- Died: 6 December 2019 (aged 86); Warminster, Wiltshire, England
- Batting: Right-handed
- Bowling: Right-arm medium
- Role: Bowler

International information
- National side: England (1957–1958)
- Test debut (cap 48): 27 December 1957 v New Zealand
- Last Test: 21 March 1958 v Australia

Domestic team information
- Years: Team
- 1955–1964: Surrey

Career statistics
Competition	WTest	WFC
Matches	3	20
Runs scored	5	50
Batting average	1.66	6.25
100s/50s	0/0	0/0
Top score	5	16
Balls bowled	564	2,770
Wickets	10	43
Bowling average	17.80	17.69
5 wickets in innings	0	0
10 wickets in match	0	0
Best bowling	4/36	4/22
Catches/stumpings	2/–	12/–
- Source: CricketArchive, 7 March 2021

Joan Lillian Hawes (18 November 1933 – 6 December 2019) was an English cricketer who played as a right-arm medium bowler. Having made her Test debut against New Zealand in December 1957, she appeared in three Test matches for England in 1957 and 1958. She played domestic cricket for Surrey.
