= South Africa women's cricket team in the West Indies in 2012–13 =

South African women's cricket team in the West Indies in 2012–13
	West Indies	South Africa
- Dates: 3 – 20 January 2013
Captains	Merissa Aguilleira	Mignon du Preez

One Day International series
- Results: 5-match series drawn 2–2
Most runs	Stafanie Taylor (178)	Mignon du Preez (133)
Most wickets	Shaquana Quintyne (9)	Dane van Niekerk (10)
- Player of the series: Stafanie Taylor (WI)

Twenty20 International series
- Results: West Indies won the 2-match series 2–0
Most runs	Deandra Dottin (65)	Mignon du Preez (58)
Most wickets	Shanel Daley (5)	Marizanne Kapp (3)
- Player of the series: Shanel Daley (WI)

The South Africa women's national cricket team toured the West Indies in January 2013. They played the West Indies in 5 One Day Internationals and 2 Twenty20 Internationals, drawing the ODI series 2–2 and losing the T20I series 2–0. The series preceded both teams' participation in the 2013 World Cup, held in India.

== Squads ==
West Indies	South Africa
Merissa Aguilleira (c) (wk); Shemaine Campbelle; Shanel Daley; Deandra Dottin; Kycia Knight; Kyshona Knight; Natasha McLean; Anisa Mohammed; Subrina Munroe; Juliana Nero; June Ogle; Shaquana Quintyne; Shakera Selman; Tremayne Smartt; Stafanie Taylor	Mignon du Preez (c); Susan Benade; Cri-Zelda Brits; Trisha Chetty (wk); Savanna Cordes (wk); Dinesha Devnarain; Shandre Fritz; Marizanne Kapp; Marcia Letsoalo; Sunette Loubser; Yolandi Potgieter; Elriesa Theunissen-Fourie; Chloe Tryon; Dane van Niekerk

== Tour Matches ==
=== 50-over match: Saint Kitts Under-17 Boys v South Africa ===
3 January 2013
Scorecard

Saint Kitts Under-17 Boys; 220/6 (45 overs)	v	South Africa; 221/1 (39.1 overs)
Shane Venner 90 (91); Chloe Tryon 4/44 (9 overs)		Shandre Fritz 78* (106); Osborne Hewitt 1/46 (9 overs)

South Africa Women won by 9 wickets
Conaree Sports Club, Saint Kitts
Umpires: Luther Kelly (WI) and Wycliffe Mitchum (WI)

- No toss.

=== 50-over match: Saint Kitts Under-17 Boys v South Africa ===
5 January 2013
Scorecard

South Africa; 238/8 (50 overs)	v	Saint Kitts Under-17 Boys; 199 (46 overs)
Trisha Chetty 64 (77); Harvey 2/38 (8 overs)		Cameron Pennyfeather 50 (59); Yolandi Potgieter 3/31 (10 overs)

South Africa Women won by 39 runs
Conaree Sports Club, Saint Kitts

- No toss.

== WODI Series ==
=== 1st ODI ===
7 January 2013
Scorecard

South Africa; 206/8 (50 overs)	v	West Indies; 126 (35.3 overs)
Trisha Chetty 57 (83); Shaquana Quintyne 2/30 (10 overs)		Merissa Aguilleira 40 (43); Dane van Niekerk 5/28 (7 overs)

South Africa Women won by 80 runs
Warner Park, Basseterre, Saint Kitts
Umpires: Norman Malcolm (WI) and Zahid Bassarath (WI)

- South Africa Women won the toss and elected to bat.
- Yolandi Potgieter (SA) made her WODI debut.

=== 2nd ODI ===
9 January 2013
Scorecard

West Indies; 128 (48.2 overs)	v	South Africa; 129/6 (47.5 overs)
Stafanie Taylor 29 (46); Sunette Loubser 4/11 (8 overs)		Dane van Niekerk 33* (70); Shanel Daley 1/19 (10 overs)

South Africa Women won by 4 wickets
Warner Park, Basseterre, Saint Kitts
Umpires: Norman Malcolm (WI) and Zahid Bassarath (WI)
Player of the match: Sunette Loubser (SA)

- West Indies Women won the toss and elected to bat.

=== 3rd ODI ===
12 January 2013
Scorecard

South Africa; 120 (47.1 overs)	v	West Indies; 121/2 (29.2 overs)
Mignon du Preez 20 (44); Shaquana Quintyne 4/14 (10 overs)		Stafanie Taylor 71 (98); Sunette Loubser 1/13 (3 overs)

West Indies Women won by 8 wickets
Windsor Park, Roseau, Dominica
Umpires: Danesh Ramdhanie (WI) and Lennox Abraham (WI)
Player of the match: Stafanie Taylor (WI)

- West Indies Women won the toss and elected to field.

=== 4th ODI ===
13 January 2013
Scorecard

South Africa; 139 (43 overs)	v	West Indies; 8/0 (2 overs)
Cri-Zelda Brits 36 (59); Shanel Daley 3/19 (9 overs)		Kycia Knight 4* (9)

No result
Windsor Park, Roseau, Dominica
Umpires: Danesh Ramdhanie (WI) and Lennox Abraham (WI)

- West Indies Women won the toss and elected to field.
- No further play possible due to rain.
- Match reduced to 43 overs per side due to rain.
- West Indies Women were set a revised target of 141 runs from 43 overs.
- Kyshona Knight (WI) made her WODI debut.

=== 5th ODI ===
15 January 2013
Scorecard

West Indies; 177/8 (50 overs)	v	South Africa; 155 (46.3 overs)
Stafanie Taylor 76 (107); Dane van Niekerk 3/31 (10 overs)		Marizanne Kapp 40 (56); Shakera Selman 2/14 (6 overs)

West Indies Women won by 22 runs
Windsor Park, Roseau, Dominica
Umpires: Danesh Ramdhanie (WI) and Lennox Abraham (WI)
Player of the match: Stafanie Taylor (WI)

- South Africa Women won the toss and elected to field.
- Savanna Cordes (SA) made her WODI debut.

== WT20I Series ==
=== 1st T20I ===
19 January 2013
Scorecard

South Africa; 113/7 (20 overs)	v	West Indies; 114/2 (18.2 overs)
Mignon du Preez 39 (48); Shanel Daley 2/14 (4 overs)		Deandra Dottin 48* (30); Sunette Loubser 1/19 (3 overs)

West Indies Women won by 8 wickets
Beausejour Stadium, Gros Islet, Saint Lucia
Umpires: Gregory Brathwaite (WI) and Leslie Reifer (WI)
Player of the match: Deandra Dottin (WI)

- South Africa Women won the toss and elected to bat.
- Savanna Cordes, Elriesa Theunissen-Fourie (SA) and Kyshona Knight (WI) all made their WT20I debuts.

=== 2nd T20I ===
20 January 2013
Scorecard

South Africa; 94/6 (20 overs)	v	West Indies; 97/4 (17.2 overs)
Mignon du Preez 26 (41); Shanel Daley 3/22 (4 overs)		Shemaine Campbelle 33 (28); Marizanne Kapp 3/3 (4 overs)

West Indies Women won by 6 wickets
Beausejour Stadium, Gros Islet, Saint Lucia
Umpires: Joel Wilson (WI) and Peter Nero (WI)
Player of the match: Shanel Daley (WI)

- West Indies Women won the toss and elected to field.
- Yolandi Potgieter (SA) made her WT20I debut.
