= Pat Carrick =

New Zealand cricketer and umpire

Pat Carrick-Clarke KSM
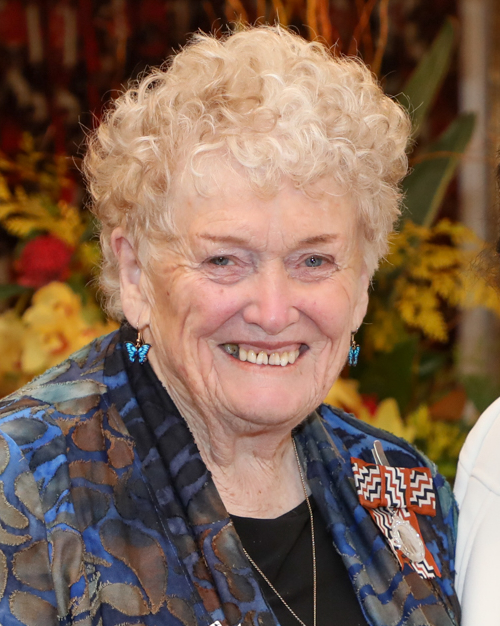
- Carrick-Clarke in 2024

Personal information
- Full name: Patricia Frances Carrick-Clarke
- Born: 27 September 1941 (age 85); Dunedin, New Zealand
- Batting: Right-handed
- Bowling: Right-arm medium
- Role: Bowler

International information
- National side: New Zealand (1969–1978)
- Test debut (cap 55): 7 March 1969 v England
- Last Test: 8 January 1977 v India
- ODI debut (cap 17): 1 January 1978 v Australia
- Last ODI: 8 January 1978 v England

Domestic team information
- Years: Team
- 1961/62–1963/64: Canterbury
- 1966/67–1971/72: North Shore
- 1972/73–1979/80: Canterbury

Umpiring information
- WTests umpired: 1 (1990)
- WODIs umpired: 1 (1990)
- FC umpired: 1 (1990)

Career statistics
| Competition | WTest | WODI | WFC | WLA |
|---|---|---|---|---|
| Matches | 7 | 3 | 72 | 12 |
| Runs scored | 63 | 7 | 688 | 60 |
| Batting average | 7.87 | 7.00 | 10.26 | 8.57 |
| 100s/50s | 0/0 | 0/0 | 0/1 | 0/0 |
| Top score | 21 | 6* | 96 | 31 |
| Balls bowled | 1,617 | 174 | 10,597 | 830 |
| Wickets | 21 | 6 | 217 | 25 |
| Bowling average | 23.28 | 17.66 | 13.58 | 13.52 |
| 5 wickets in innings | 1 | 0 | 7 | 0 |
| 10 wickets in match | 0 | 0 | 1 | 0 |
| Best bowling | 6/29 | 3/43 | 8/43 | 4/27 |
| Catches/stumpings | 4/– | 1/– | 38/– | 3/– |
- Source: CricketArchive, 12 November 2021

Patricia Frances Carrick-Clarke KSM (formerly Carrick, née Adair; born 27 September 1941) is a retired New Zealand cricketer and umpire. She played as a right-arm medium bowler. Making her international debut in a Test match against England in 1969, she appeared in seven Test matches and three One Day Internationals for New Zealand between 1969 and 1978. Her best bowling performance came in 1972, when she claimed 6/29 against Australia. She played domestic cricket for Canterbury and North Shore. In 1988, she became the first woman to umpire a men's first-class match.

In the 2024 King’s Birthday Honours, Carrick-Clarke was awarded the King's Service Medal, for services to sport, particularly cricket.
