= Jos Burley =

New Zealand cricketer (born 1942)

Personal information
- Full name: Jocelyn Anne Burley
- Born: 2 September 1942 (age 84); Auckland, New Zealand
- Batting: Right-handed
- Bowling: Right-arm fast-medium
- Role: Bowler

International information
- National side: New Zealand (1966–1973)
- Test debut (cap 45): 18 June 1966 v England
- Last Test: 28 March 1969 v England
- ODI debut (cap 3): 23 June 1973 v Trinidad and Tobago
- Last ODI: 30 June 1973 v International XI

Domestic team information
- Years: Team
- 1959/60–1967/68: Auckland
- 1968/69–1972/73: North Shore
- 1974/75: Southern Transvaal

Career statistics
Competition	WTest	WODI	WFC
Matches	6	2	46
Runs scored	110	7	1,072
Batting average	12.22	7.00	20.22
100s/50s	0/0	0/0	0/4
Top score	46	7	87
Balls bowled	1,571	78	8,996
Wickets	21	0	175
Bowling average	26.33	–	14.71
5 wickets in innings	1	0	13
10 wickets in match	0	0	2
Best bowling	7/41	–	8/33
Catches/stumpings	3/–	0/–	19/–
- Source: CricketArchive, 16 November 2021

Jocelyn Ann Burley (born 2 September 1942) is a New Zealand former cricketer who played primarily as a right-arm fast-medium bowler. She appeared in six Test matches and two One Day Internationals for New Zealand between 1966 and 1973. She played domestic cricket for Auckland, North Shore and Southern Transvaal.

Burley's Test match best bowling came in 1966, when she took 7/41 against England.
