= Judi Doull =

New Zealand cricketer

Personal information
- Full name: Judith Diana McCarthy
- Born: 15 July 1937 (age 89); Whakatāne, New Zealand
- Batting: Right-handed
- Role: Batter

International information
- National side: New Zealand (1966–1975)
- Test debut (cap 46): 18 June 1966 v England
- Last Test: 21 March 1975 v Australia
- ODI debut (cap 5): 23 June 1973 v Trinidad & Tobago
- Last ODI: 21 July 1973 v Young England

Domestic team information
- Years: Team
- 1962/63–1967/68: Auckland
- 1968/69–1974/75: North Shore

Career statistics
Competition	WTest	WODI	WFC
Matches	11	5	70
Runs scored	779	64	3,571
Batting average	43.27	12.80	40.12
100s/50s	1/5	0/0	7/21
Top score	103	42	136*
Balls bowled	78	0	630
Wickets	0	–	6
Bowling average	–	–	42.00
5 wickets in innings	0	–	0
10 wickets in match	0	–	0
Best bowling	–	–	2/75
Catches/stumpings	6/–	2/–	52/–
- Source: CricketArchive, 15 November 2021

Judith Diana McCarthy (née Doull; born 15 July 1937) is a New Zealand former cricketer who played as a right-handed batter. She appeared in 11 Test matches and 5 One Day Internationals for New Zealand between 1966 and 1975. In Test cricket, she scored five half-centuries and one century, 103 against England. She played domestic cricket for Auckland and North Shore.
