= Jill Saulbrey =

New Zealand cricketer (born 1943)

Personal information
- Full name: Jillian Margaret Saulbrey
- Born: 22 February 1943 (age 83); Lower Hutt, New Zealand
- Batting: Right-handed
- Bowling: Left-arm fast-medium
- Role: All-rounder

International information
- National side: New Zealand (1966–1975)
- Test debut (cap 51): 18 June 1966 v England
- Last Test: 21 March 1975 v Australia
- ODI debut (cap 11): 23 June 1973 v Trinidad and Tobago
- Last ODI: 21 June 1973 v Young England

Domestic team information
- Years: Team
- 1963/64–1964/65: Otago
- 1965/66–1976/77: Wellington

Career statistics
| Competition | WTest | WODI | WFC | WLA |
|---|---|---|---|---|
| Matches | 11 | 5 | 72 | 6 |
| Runs scored | 198 | 75 | 926 | 85 |
| Batting average | 16.50 | 37.50 | 11.57 | 28.33 |
| 100s/50s | 0/1 | 0/0 | 0/1 | 0/0 |
| Top score | 62 | 22* | 62 | 22* |
| Balls bowled | 3,623 | 258 | 15,805 | 258 |
| Wickets | 35 | 4 | 309 | 4 |
| Bowling average | 27.17 | 25.00 | 12.30 | 25.00 |
| 5 wickets in innings | 1 | 0 | 20 | 0 |
| 10 wickets in match | 0 | 0 | 5 | 0 |
| Best bowling | 5/32 | 2/32 | 9/22 | 2/32 |
| Catches/stumpings | 6/– | 0/– | 23/– | 0/– |
- Source: CricketArchive, 14 November 2021

Jillian Margaret Saulbrey (born 22 February 1943) is a New Zealand former cricketer who played as an all-rounder, bowling left-arm fast-medium and batting right-handed. She appeared in eleven Test matches and five One Day Internationals for New Zealand between 1966 and 1975, and she was part of the New Zealand side that finished third in the 1973 Women's Cricket World Cup. She played domestic cricket for Otago and Wellington.

In 1976, in a Hallyburton Johnstone Shield match for Wellington against Auckland, Saulbrey took 9/22 in 16 overs in the second innings to bowl Auckland out for 51.
