= Dorothy Macfarlane =

English cricketer

Personal information
- Full name: Dorothy Irene Macfarlane
- Born: 2 December 1931; Newcastle upon Tyne, England
- Bowling: Right-arm medium
- Role: Bowler

International information
- National side: England (1957–1963)
- Test debut (cap 45): 29 November 1957 v New Zealand
- Last Test: 29 June 1963 v Australia

Domestic team information
- Years: Team
- 1949–1964: Northumberland

Career statistics
Competition	WTest	WFC
Matches	7	29
Runs scored	28	89
Batting average	4.66	7.41
100s/50s	0/0	0/0
Top score	17	17
Balls bowled	1,616	4,842
Wickets	14	64
Bowling average	30.57	21.45
5 wickets in innings	0	1
10 wickets in match	0	0
Best bowling	4/82	5/46
Catches/stumpings	3/–	13/–
- Source: CricketArchive, 7 March 2021

Dorothy Irene Macfarlane was an English cricketer who played as a right-arm pace bowler. She appeared in seven Test matches for England between 1957 and 1963. She played domestic cricket for Northumberland, for 15 years.
