= Edna Barker =

English cricketer (1936–2019)

Personal information
- Full name: Edna Barker
- Born: 24 November 1936; Beddington, Surrey, England
- Died: 25 March 2019 (aged 82)
- Batting: Right-handed
- Bowling: Right-arm off break
- Role: All-rounder

International information
- National side: England (1957–1969)
- Test debut (cap 43): 29 November 1957 v New Zealand
- Last Test: 28 March 1969 v New Zealand

Domestic team information
- Years: Team
- 1956–1968: Surrey

Career statistics
Competition	WTest	WFC
Matches	15	45
Runs scored	426	919
Batting average	25.05	23.56
100s/50s	1/3	1/5
Top score	100	100
Balls bowled	1,886	4,018
Wickets	16	66
Bowling average	37.50	20.03
5 wickets in innings	0	1
10 wickets in match	0	0
Best bowling	4/94	5/28
Catches/stumpings	6/–	29/–
- Source: CricketArchive, 8 March 2021

Edna Barker (24 November 1936 – 25 March 2019) was an English cricketer who played as a right-handed batter and right-arm off break bowler. She appeared in 15 Test matches for England between 1957 and 1969. She played domestic cricket for Surrey for 13 years.
