= Nell Massey =

Australian cricketer (born 1938)

Cricket information
- Batting: Right-handed
- Role: Wicket-keeper

International information
- National side: Australia
- Test debut (cap 46): 21 February 1958 v England
- Last Test: 21 March 1958 v England

Career statistics
Competition	Test
Matches	3
Runs scored	98
Batting average	19.60
100s/50s	0/0
Top score	40*
Catches/stumpings	3/6
- Source: CricInfo, 9 March 2015

Nell Massey (born 21 February 1938) is an Australian former international cricketer. She made her Test debut against England at Melbourne in February 1958. Massey played three Test matches for the Australia national women's cricket team.
