= Margaret Lockwood (cricketer) =

English cricketer

Personal information
- Full name: Margaret Lockwood
- Born: 28 March 1911; Huddersfield, Yorkshire, England
- Died: 14 January 1999 (aged 87); Leeds, West Yorkshire, England
- Role: Wicket-keeper

International information
- National side: England (1951)
- Test debut (cap 33): 16 June 1951 v Australia
- Last Test: 30 June 1951 v Australia

Domestic team information
- Years: Team
- 1949–1963: Yorkshire

Career statistics
Competition	WTest	WFC
Matches	2	12
Runs scored	2	99
Batting average	1.00	7.61
100s/50s	0/0	0/1
Top score	1*	60
Catches/stumpings	5/0	13/10
- Source: CricketArchive, 9 March 2021

Margaret Lockwood (28 March 1911 – 14 January 1999) was an English cricketer who played primarily as a wicket-keeper. She appeared in two Test matches for England in 1951, both against Australia. She played domestic cricket for Yorkshire.
