= Trish McKelvey =

New Zealand cricketer (born 1942)

Trish McKelvey CNZM MBE
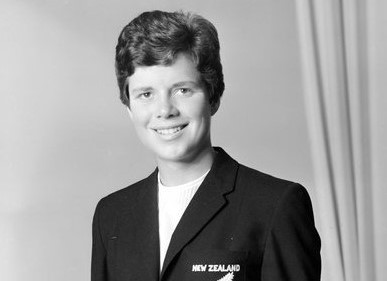

Personal information
- Full name: Patricia Frances McKelvey
- Born: 5 January 1942 (age 84); Lower Hutt, New Zealand
- Batting: Right-handed
- Bowling: Right-arm medium
- Role: Batter

International information
- National sides: New Zealand (1966–1982); International XI (1973)
- Test debut (cap 48): 18 June 1966; New Zealand v England
- Last Test: 26 January 1979; New Zealand v Australia
- ODI debut (cap 20/8): 23 June 1973; International XI v England
- Last ODI: 6 February 1982; New Zealand v Australia

Domestic team information
- Years: Team
- 1960/61–1961/62: Wellington
- 1962/63: Otago
- 1963/64–1981/82: Wellington

Career statistics
Competition	WTest	WODI	WFC	WLA
Matches	15	21	106	38
Runs scored	699	320	3,206	503
Batting average	29.12	21.33	25.64	21.86
100s/50s	2/1	0/1	4/14	0/1
Top score	155*	54	155*	54
Balls bowled	–	–	314	–
Wickets	–	–	9	–
Bowling average	–	–	9.44	–
5 wickets in innings	–	–	0	–
10 wickets in match	–	–	0	–
Best bowling	–	–	3/17	–
Catches/stumpings	8/–	3/–	55/1	8/–
- Source: CricketArchive, 11 November 2021

Patricia Frances McKelvey CNZM MBE (born 5 January 1942), often known as Trish McKelvey, is a New Zealand former cricketer, cricket administrator and educator. She appeared in 15 Test matches and 15 One Day Internationals for New Zealand between 1966 and 1982. She also appeared in 6 One Day Internationals for International XI at the 1973 World Cup. She played domestic cricket for Wellington and Otago.

== Early life ==
McKelvey was born in Lower Hutt in 1942. She was educated at Wellington Girls' College from 1955 to 1959, where she was captain of both the senior 'A' netball and 1st XI cricket teams.

== Cricket career ==
She played 15 Test matches for New Zealand, captaining the team in all of them. The record was two wins, three defeats and ten draws. Her Test career spanned the period 1966 to 1979, and included Tests against not only traditional rivals England and Australia, but also against South Africa and India. The three-Test tour of South Africa in 1971–72, which was won 1–0, was the last official representative match any South African cricket team, men's or women's, would play for 18 years as teams boycotted South Africa because of the apartheid regime.

McKelvey scored 699 Test runs at an average of 29.12, with a highest score of 155*. She also captained New Zealand in all 15 One Day Internationals she played in, winning seven, losing seven, with one tie. McKelvey also played for the International XI in the 1973 Women's Cricket World Cup, finishing fourth out of seven teams.

McKelvey's 15 Tests as captain means she has captained New Zealand more times than the next two women in the list combined. As of July 2005, she remains the only New Zealand women's Test captain to have won a Test match.

In 1992, McKelvey became the first woman board member of New Zealand Cricket. She has also served on the board of Bowls New Zealand.

== Education career ==
Outside of cricket, McKelvey had a distinguished career in education. She trained as a physical education teacher and taught at Hutt Valley Memorial College, Solway College and Wellington High School. She was principal of Wellington High School for seven years, retiring in 1994. She has since served on the boards of other educational institutions, including being a member of the Council of Victoria University of Wellington from 2007 to 2012 and chair of The Correspondence School board of trustees.

== Honours ==
McKelvey was appointed a Member of the Order of the British Empire, for services to women's cricket, in the 1981 Queen's Birthday Honours. In the 2005 Queen's Birthday Honours, she was made a Companion of the New Zealand Order of Merit, for services to education.

== See also ==
- List of centuries in women's Test cricket
