= Jackie Lord =

English-born New Zealand cricketer (born 1947)

Personal information
- Full name: Jacqueline Lord
- Born: 1 August 1947 (age 79); Rochdale, Lancashire, England
- Batting: Right-handed
- Bowling: Right-arm leg break
- Role: Bowler

International information
- National side: New Zealand (1966–1982)
- Test debut (cap 47): 18 June 1966 v England
- Last Test: 26 January 1979 v Australia
- ODI debut (cap 13): 30 June 1973 v International XI
- Last ODI: 6 February 1982 v Australia

Domestic team information
- Years: Team
- 1965/66–1971/72: North Shore
- 1972/73–1975/76: Canterbury
- 1976/77–1981/82: Wellington Blaze

Career statistics
Competition	WTest	WODI	WFC	WLA
Matches	15	15	94	25
Runs scored	258	101	1,507	299
Batting average	13.57	7.76	17.12	14.23
100s/50s	0/0	0/0	0/6	0/1
Top score	39*	25	84	53
Balls bowled	3,108	795	13,824	1,431
Wickets	55	25	449	43
Bowling average	19.07	12.72	10.66	12.72
5 wickets in innings	4	1	35	1
10 wickets in match	1	0	8	0
Best bowling	6/119	6/10	8/63	6/10
Catches/stumpings	5/–	2/–	42/–	5/–
- Source: CricketArchive, 12 November 2021

Jacqueline Lord (born 1 August 1947) is an English-born New Zealand former cricketer who played as a right-arm leg break bowler. She appeared in 15 Test matches and 15 One Day Internationals for New Zealand between 1966 and 1982. She played domestic cricket for North Shore, Canterbury and Wellington.

Lord holds the record for the best bowling figures in the Women's Cricket World Cup history, taking 6/10 against India on 14 January 1982.
