= New Zealand women's national cricket team =

New Zealand
- Nickname: White Ferns
- Association: New Zealand Cricket

Personnel
- Captain: Amelia Kerr
- Coach: Ben Sawyer

International Cricket Council
- ICC status: Full member (1926)
- ICC region: East Asia-Pacific
ICC Rankings	Current	Best-ever
ODI	5th	2nd
T20I	3rd	3rd

Tests
- First Test: v England at Lancaster Park, Christchurch; 16–18 February 1935
- Last Test: v England at North Marine Road Ground, Scarborough; 21–24 August 2004
Tests	Played	Won/Lost
Total	45	2/10 (33 draws)

One Day Internationals
- First ODI: v Trinidad and Tobago at Clarence Park, St Albans; 23 June 1973
- Last ODI: v England at Sophia Gardens, Cardiff; 16 May 2026
ODIs	Played	Won/Lost
Total	409	197/197 (3 ties, 12 no results)
This year	9	6/2 (0 ties, 1 no result)
- World Cup appearances: 11 (first in 1973)
- Best result: Champions (2000)

T20 Internationals
- First T20I: v England at the County Cricket Ground, Hove; 5 August 2004
- Last T20I: v Australia at North Sydney Oval, Sydney; 22 October 2026
T20Is	Played	Won/Lost
Total	207	110/89 (3 ties, 5 no results)
This year	19	10/8 (0 ties, 1 no result)
- T20 World Cup appearances: 9 (first in 2009)
- Best result: Champions (2024)
- Official website: www.nzc.nz/international/white-ferns/
Test kit
ODI kit
T20I kit
- As of 22 October 2026

The New Zealand women's national cricket team, nicknamed the White Ferns, represents New Zealand in international women's cricket. One of eight teams competing in the ICC Women's Championship (the highest level of international women's cricket), the team is organised by New Zealand Cricket, a full member of the International Cricket Council (ICC).

New Zealand made its Test debut in 1935, against England, becoming the third team to play at that level. With Australia and England, New Zealand is one of only three teams to have participated in all ten editions of the Women's Cricket World Cup. The team has made the final of the tournament on four occasions, winning in 2000 and placing second in 1993, 1997, and 2009. At the Women's T20 World Cup, New Zealand were champions in 2024 and runners up in 2009 and 2010.

== Tournament history ==
A red box around the year indicates tournaments played within New Zealand

Key
Champions
Runners-up
Semi-finals

=== ICC Women's Cricket World Cup ===
World Cup record
Year	Round	GP	W	L	T	NR
(England) 1973	Third place	6	3	2	0	1
(India) 1978	Third place	3	1	2	0	0
(New Zealand) 1982	Third place	12	6	5	1	0
(Australia) 1988	Third place	9	6	3	0	0
(England) 1993	Runners-up	8	7	1	0	0
(India) 1997	Runners-up	6	4	1	1	0
(New Zealand) 2000	Champions	9	8	1	0	0
(South Africa) 2005	Semi finalists	8	4	2	0	2
(Australia) 2009	Runners-up	7	5	2	0	0
(India) 2013	Super Sixes	7	3	4	0	0
(England) 2017	Group stage	7	3	3	0	1
(New Zealand) 2022	Group Stage	7	3	4	0	0
(India) (Sri Lanka) 2025	Group stage	7	1	4	0	2
Total	1 Title	94	55	34	2	3

=== ICC Women's T20 World Cup ===
T20 World Cup record
Year	Round	GP	W	L	T	NR
(England) 2009	Runners-up	5	4	1	0	0
(Cricket West Indies) 2010	Runners-up	5	4	1	0	0
(Sri Lanka) 2012	Semi-finalists	4	2	2	0	0
(Bangladesh) 2014	Group stage	5	4	1	0	0
(India) 2016	Semi-finalists	5	4	1	0	0
(Cricket West Indies) 2018	Group stage	4	2	2	0	0
(Australia) 2020	Group stage	4	2	2	0	0
(South Africa) 2023	Group stage	4	2	2	0	0
(United Arab Emirates) 2024	Champions	6	5	1	0	0
(England) 2026	Group stage	5	2	3	0	0
Total	1 Title	47	31	16	0	0

=== Commonwealth Games ===
Commonwealth Games record
Year	Round	Position	GP	W	L	T	NR
(England) 2022	Bronze medal	3/8	5	3	2	0	0
Total	0 Title	-	5	3	2	0	0

== Honours ==
=== ICC ===
- Women's World Cup:
  - Champions (1): 2000
  - Runners-up (3): 1993, 1997, 2009
- Women's T20 World Cup:
  - Champions (1): 2024
  - Runners-up (2): 2009, 2010

=== Others ===
- Commonwealth Games
  - Bronze medal (1): 2022

== Current squad ==
This lists all the players are centrally contracted with NZC or were named in the most recent ODI or T20I squad. Updated as on 02 April 2026

Uncapped players are listed in italics

Name	Age	Batting style	Bowling style	Formats	Contract	Club	Notes
Batters
Suzie Bates	16 September 1987 (age 39)	Right-handed	Right arm medium	ODI, T20I	Y	Otago Sparks	
Lauren Down	7 May 1995 (age 31)	Right-handed	Right arm medium	ODI, T20I	Y	Auckland Hearts	
Maddy Green	20 October 1992 (age 34)	Right-handed	Right arm off spin	ODI, T20I	Y	Auckland Hearts	
Brooke Halliday	30 October 1995 (age 30)	Left-handed	Right arm medium	ODI, T20I	Y	Auckland Hearts	
Georgia Plimmer	8 February 2004 (age 22)	Right-handed	—N/a	ODI, T20I	Y	Wellington Blaze	
All-rounders
Amelia Kerr	13 October 2000 (age 26)	Right-handed	Right arm leg spin	ODI, T20I	Y	Wellington Blaze	Captain
Hannah Rowe	3 October 1996 (age 30)	Right-handed	Right arm medium	ODI, T20I	Y	Central Districts Hinds	
Flora Devonshire	13 February 2003 (age 23)	Left-handed	Left arm off spin	ODI, T20I	N	Central Districts Hinds	
Wicket-keepers
Izzy Gaze	8 May 2004 (age 22)	Right-handed	—N/a	ODI, T20I	Y	Auckland Hearts	
Polly Inglis	31 May 1996 (age 30)	Right-handed	Right arm medium	ODI, T20I	Y	Otago Sparks	
Bella James	27 January 1999 (age 27)	Right-handed	—N/a	ODI, T20I	Y	Otago Sparks	
Izzy Sharp	1 December 2004 (age 21)	Right-handed	—N/a	ODI, T20I	N	Canterbury Magicians	
Spin Bowlers
Eden Carson	8 August 2001 (age 25)	Right-handed	Right arm off spin	ODI, T20I	Y	Otago Sparks	
Fran Jonas	8 April 2004 (age 22)	Right-handed	Slow left-arm orthodox	ODI, T20I	Y	Auckland Hearts	
Nensi Patel	27 May 2002 (age 24)	Right-handed	Right arm off spin	ODI, T20I	N	Northern Districts Brave	
Pace Bowlers
Bree Illing	29 September 2003 (age 23)	Left-handed	Left arm medium	ODI, T20I	Y	Auckland Hearts	
Jess Kerr	18 January 1998 (age 28)	Right-handed	Right arm medium	ODI, T20I	Y	Wellington Blaze	
Rosemary Mair	7 November 1998 (age 27)	Right-handed	Right arm medium	ODI, T20I	Y	Central Districts Hinds	
Molly Penfold	15 June 2001 (age 25)	Right-handed	Right arm medium	ODI, T20I	Y	Auckland Hearts	
Lea Tahuhu	23 September 1990 (age 36)	Right-handed	Right arm medium-fast	ODI, T20I	Y	Canterbury Magicians	
Kayley Knight	20 October 2003 (age 23)	Right-handed	Right arm medium	ODI, T20I	N	Northern Districts Brave	

== Coaching staff ==
Position	Name
Head coach	Ben Sawyer
Assistant coaches	Martin Guptill, Andre Adams
Physiotherapist	Helen Littleworth
Media Correspondent	Willy Nicholls

As of 9 October 2026

== Records and statistics ==
International Match Summary — New Zealand Women

Result summary of the New Zealand women's cricket team
Format	M	W	L	T	NR	Inaugural match
Women's Test	45	2	10	0	33	16 February 1935
Women's One-Day Internationals	406	196	196	3	11	7 July 1973
Women's Twenty20 Internationals	196	107	82	3	4	5 August 2004
Last updated: 4 April 2026

=== Women's Test cricket ===
- Highest team total: 517/8 v. England on 24 June 1996 at North Marine Road Ground, Scarborough.
- Highest individual score: 204, Kirsty Flavell v. England on 24 June 1996 at North Marine Road Ground, Scarborough.
- Best innings bowling: 7/41, Jos Burley v. England on 6 August 1966 at The Oval, London.

Most Test runs for New Zealand Women

Player	Runs	Average	Career span
Debbie Hockley	1301	52.04	1979–1996
Judi Doull	779	43.27	1966–1975
Trish McKelvey	699	29.12	1966–1979
Jackie Clark	482	26.77	1984–1992
Kirsty Flavell	473	67.57	1995–1996

Most Test wickets for New Zealand Women

Player	Wickets	Average	Career span
Jackie Lord	55	19.07	1966–1979
Jill Saulbrey	35	27.17	1966–1975
Pat Carrick	21	23.28	1969–1977
Jos Burley	21	26.33	1966–1969

Highest individual innings in Women's Test

Player	Score	Opposition	Venue	Match date
Kirsty Flavell	204	England	Scarborough	24 June 1996
Emily Drumm	161*	Australia	Christchurch	28 February 1995
Trish McKelvey	155*	England	Wellington	15 February 1969
Debbie Hockley	126*	Australia	Auckland	18 January 1990
Trish McKelvey	117*	South Africa	Cape Town	25 February 1972

Best bowling figures in an innings in Women's Test

Player	Score	Opposition	Venue	Match date
Jos Burley	7/41	England	London	6 August 1966
Pat Carrick	6/29	Australia	Melbourne	5 February 1972
Grace Gooder	6/42	England	Auckland	26 March 1949
Katrina Keenan	6/73	England	Worcester	4 July 1996
Jackie Lord	6/119	Australia	Melbourne	26 January 1979

Women's Test record versus other nations

Records complete to Women's Test #123. Last updated 24 August 2004.

Opponent	Matches	Won	Lost	Tied	Draw	First match	First win
Australia	13	1	4	0	8	20–23 March 1948	5–8 February 1972
England	23	0	6	0	17	16–18 February 1935	
India	6	0	0	0	6	8–11 January 1977	
South Africa	3	1	0	0	2	25–28 February 1972	10–13 March 1972

=== Women's One-Day International ===
- Highest team total: 491/4 v. Ireland on 8 June 2018 at YMCA Cricket Club, Dublin.
- Highest individual score: 232*, Amelia Kerr v. Ireland on 13 June 2018 at YMCA Cricket Club, Dublin.
- Best innings bowling: 7/34, Amelia Kerr v. Zimbabwe on 8 March 2026 at University of Otago Oval, Dunedin.
- Highest successful run chase: 350 (49.4) v. South Africa on 1 April 2026 at Basin Reserve, Wellington.

Top 5 individual innings in Women's ODI

Player	Score	Opposition	Venue	Match date
Amelia Kerr	232*	Ireland	Dublin	13 June 2018
Amelia Kerr	179*	South Africa	Wellington	1 April 2026
Suzie Bates	168	Pakistan	Sydney	19 March 2009
Brooke Halliday	157*	Zimbabwe	Dunedin	5 March 2026
Rachel Priest	157	Sri Lanka	Lincoln	7 November 2015

Top 5 best bowling figures in an innings in Women's ODI

Player	Score	Opposition	Venue	Match date
Amelia Kerr	7/34	Zimbabwe	Dunedin	8 March 2026
Jackie Lord	6/10	India	Auckland	14 January 1982
Glenys Page	6/20	Trinidad and Tobago	St Albans	23 June 1973
Beth McNeill	6/32	England	Lincoln	24 February 2008
Leigh Kasperek	6/46	Australia	Bay Oval	7 February 2021

Most WODI runs for New Zealand Women

Player	Runs	Average	Career span
Suzie Bates	5964	38.47	2006–present
Amy Satterthwaite	4639	38.33	2007–2023
Sophie Devine	4279	32.66	2006–2025
Debbie Hockley	4064	41.89	1982–2000
Haidee Tiffen	2919	30.72	1999–2009

Most WODI wickets for New Zealand Women

Player	Wickets	Average	Career span
Amelia Kerr	126	27.54	2016–present
Lea Tahuhu	125	28.01	2011–2025
Sophie Devine	111	36.27	2006–2025
Aimee Watkins	92	31.04	2002–2011
Nicola Browne	88	34.14	2002–2014

WODI record versus other nations

Opponent	Matches	Won	Lost	Tied	N/R	First match	First win
ICC Full members
Australia	136	31	103	0	2	7 July 1973	8 February 1985
Bangladesh	5	3	0	0	2	7 March 2022	7 March 2022
England	86	37	47	1	1	14 July 1973	14 July 1973
India	58	34	23	1	0	5 January 1978	5 January 1978
Ireland	20	18	0	0	2	29 November 1988	29 November 1988
Pakistan	18	15	1	1	1	28 January 1997	28 January 1997
South Africa	24	14	10	0	0	13 February 1999	13 February 1999
Sri Lanka	17	13	2	0	2	13 December 1997	13 December 1997
West Indies	23	13	9	0	1	26 July 1993	26 July 1993
Zimbabwe	3	3	0	0	0	5 March 2026	5 March 2026
ICC Associate members
Denmark	1	1	0	0	0	24 July 1993	24 July 1993
International XI	4	3	1	0	0	30 June 1973	12 January 1982
Netherlands	9	9	0	0	0	8 August 1984	8 August 1984
Trinidad and Tobago	1	1	0	0	0	23 June 1973	23 June 1973
Young England	1	1	0	0	0	21 July 1973	21 July 1973
Last updated: 11 March 2026

=== Women's T20I cricket ===
- Highest team total: 216/1, v. South Africa on 20 June 2018 at County Ground, Taunton.
- Highest individual innings: 124*, Suzie Bates v. South Africa on 20 June 2018 at County Ground, Taunton.
- Best innings bowling: 6/17, Amy Satterthwaite v. England on 16 August 2007 at County Ground, Taunton.

Top 5 individual innings in Women's T20I

Player	Score	Opposition	Venue	Match date
Suzie Bates	124*	South Africa	Taunton	20 June 2018
Sophie Devine	105	South Africa	Wellington	10 February 2020
Amelia Kerr	105	South Africa	Christchurch	25 March 2026
Amelia Kerr	101*	Zimbabwe	Hamilton	25 February 2026
Suzie Bates	94*	Pakistan	Sylhet	27 March 2014

Top 5 Best bowling figures in an innings in Women's T20I

Player	Score	Opposition	Venue	Match date
Amy Satterthwaite	6/17	England	Taunton	16 August 2007
Lea Tahuhu	4/6	Bangladesh	Christchurch	2 December 2022
Leigh Kasperek	4/7	Australia	Wellington	28 February 2016
Morna Nielsen	4/10	England	Invercargill	26 February 2012
Sophie Devine	4/10	South Africa	Mount Maunganui	15 March 2026

Most WT20I runs for New Zealand Women

Player	Runs	Average	Career span
Suzie Bates	4717	28.93	2007–present
Sophie Devine	3587	28.25	2006–present
Amelia Kerr	1912	32.96	2016–present
Amy Satterthwaite	1784	21.49	2007–2021
Maddy Green	1270	17.39	2012–present

Most WT20I wickets for New Zealand Women

Player	Wickets	Average	Career span
Sophie Devine	128	18.87	2006–present
Amelia Kerr	104	20.12	2011–present
Lea Tahuhu	98	19.85	2016–present
Leigh Kasperek	81	14.86	2015–2024
Suzie Bates	62	23.80	2007–present

WT20I record versus other nations

Opponent	Matches	Won	Lost	Tied	N/R	First match	First win
ICC Full members
Australia	55	21	32	1	1	18 October 2006	6 March 2008
Bangladesh	5	5	0	0	0	29 February 2020	29 February 2020
England	40	8	32	0	0	5 August 2004	5 August 2004
India	14	10	4	0	0	18 June 2009	18 June 2009
Ireland	4	4	0	0	0	25 March 2014	25 March 2014
Pakistan	12	10	2	0	0	10 May 2010	10 May 2010
South Africa	22	16	5	0	1	10 August 2007	10 August 2007
Sri Lanka	17	14	2	0	1	8 May 2010	8 May 2010
West Indies	24	16	5	2	1	13 June 2009	13 June 2009
Zimbabwe	3	3	0	0	0	25 February 2026	25 February 2026
Last updated: 20 March 2026

Note: New Zealand Women lost a Super Over against Australia Women and won a Super Over against West Indies Women.

== See also ==
- New Zealand men's team
