= England women's cricket team in Australia and New Zealand in 1991–92 =

England women's cricket team in New Zealand in 1991–92
	New Zealand	England
- Dates: 8 January – 15 February 1992
Captains	Karen Plummer	Helen Plimmer

Test series
- Result: England won the 3-match series 1–0
Most runs	Debbie Hockley (195)	Carole Hodges (214)
Most wickets	Jennifer Turner (11)	Jo Chamberlain (14)

The England women's cricket team toured Australia and New Zealand in January and February 1992. England played three Test matches against New Zealand, one Test match against Australia, and against both sides in a ODI tri-series. The Test match against Australia was played for the Women's Ashes, which Australia won, therefore retaining the Ashes. Australia also won the tri-series, by virtue of winning the group stage after the final against England ended in a no result due to rain, whilst England beat New Zealand in their Test series 1–0.

== Tour of New Zealand ==
=== Squads ===
New Zealand	England
Karen Plummer (c); Jackie Clark; Emily Drumm; Shelley Fruin (wk); Karen Gunn; Julie Harris; Debbie Hockley; Yvonne Kainuku; Penny Kinsella; Maia Lewis; Kim McDonald; Sarah McLauchlan; Jennifer Turner; Nancy Williams; Tania Woodbury	Helen Plimmer (c); Jan Brittin; Jane Cassar (wk); Jo Chamberlain; Carole Hodges; Suzie Kitson; Debra Maybury; Sue Metcalfe; Lisa Nye (wk); Karen Smithies; Debra Stock; Janet Tedstone; Wendy Watson

=== Tour matches ===
==== 60-over match: Northern Selection v England ====
8 January 1992
Scorecard

England; 184/7 (60 overs)	v	Northern Selection; 85 (46.3 overs)
Sue Metcalfe 56* (86); Kathryn Ramel 2/62 (12 overs)		Losi Harford 13 (20); Jo Chamberlain 3/15 (11.3 overs)

England Women won by 99 runs
Melville Park, Auckland
Umpires: Ness Khan (NZ) and Tim Parlane (NZ)

- Northern Selection Women won the toss and elected to field.

==== 60-over match: Northern Selection v England ====
9 January 1992
Scorecard

England; 142/9 (60 overs)	v	Northern Selection; 91 (46.1 overs)
Suzie Kitson 31* (83); Emily Drumm 4/27 (12 overs)		Michelle Morland 18 (67); Jo Chamberlain 5/26 (11.1 overs)

England Women won by 51 runs
Devonport Domain, Auckland
Umpires: Ness Khan (NZ) and Tim Parlane (NZ)

- Northern Selection Women won the toss and elected to field.

==== 3-day match: New Zealand President's XI v England ====
27 – 29 January 1992
Scorecard

England	v	New Zealand President's XI
244/8d (84 overs); Wendy Watson 92 (175); Antoinette Spain 3/62 (20 overs)		209/5d (157.1 overs); Penny Kinsella 55 (166); Jo Chamberlain 3/71 (29 overs)
198/5d (198 overs); Sue Metcalfe 62* (117); Kathryn Ryan 2/42 (11 overs)		83 (61.1 overs); Karen Musson 21 (50); Suzie Kitson 3/11 (14 overs)

England Women won by 150 runs
Hagley Oval, Christchurch
Umpires: Gary Beer (NZ) and Graeme Clark (NZ)

- England Women won the toss and elected to bat.

==== 3-day match: New Zealand Under-23s v England ====
1 – 3 February 1992
Scorecard

England	v	New Zealand Under-23s
247/6d (91 overs); Wendy Watson 153* (269); Emily Drumm 3/58 (17 overs)		248/8d (104.1 overs); Maia Lewis 67 (193); Debra Maybury 2/46 (18 overs)
238/9d (65.5 overs); Carole Hodges 83 (122); Justine Russell 3/38 (12.5 overs)		157/8 (72 overs); Michelle Morland 28 (101); Karen Smithies 2/26 (11 overs)

Match drawn
McLean Park, Napier
Umpires: Malcolm MacLean (NZ) and Trevor Taylor (NZ)

- England Women won the toss and elected to bat.

=== Test Series ===
==== 1st Test ====
11 – 14 January 1992
Scorecard

England	v	New Zealand
356/9d (159.5 overs); Jan Brittin 68 (160); Karen Gunn 3/68 (44.5 overs)		214/9 (138 overs); Karen Gunn 49 (62); Carole Hodges 4/21 (38 overs)

Match drawn
Cornwall Park, Auckland
Umpires: Owen Paul (NZ) and Thomas McCall (NZ)
Player of the match: Carole Hodges (Eng)

- England Women won the toss and elected to bat.
- Suzie Kitson, Debra Maybury, Lisa Nye, Helen Plimmer (Eng), Shelley Fruin, Yvonne Kainuku, Maia Lewis and Kim McDonald (NZ) all made their WTest debuts.

==== 2nd Test ====
6 – 9 February 1992
Scorecard

New Zealand	v	England
212 (131.4 overs); Debbie Hockley 79 (348); Jo Chamberlain 5/84 (33 overs)		144 (98 overs); Helen Plimmer 46 (231); Debbie Hockley 2/9 (12 overs)
104 (88.1 overs); Maia Lewis 24 (107); Jo Chamberlain 3/42 (20.1 overs)		173/6 (124.2 overs); Carole Hodges 48 (263); Jennifer Turner 3/42

England Women won by 4 wickets
Cooks Gardens, Wanganui
Umpires: Ray Hutchison (NZ) and Danny Rice (NZ)

- New Zealand Women won the toss and elected to bat.
- Debra Stock (Eng), Sarah McLauchlan and Tania Woodbury (NZ) all made their WTest debuts.

==== 3rd Test ====
12 – 15 February 1992
Scorecard

New Zealand	v	England
142 (105 overs); Debbie Hockley 65 (270); Jo Chamberlain 5/26 (23 overs)		228/7 (113 overs); Carole Hodges 96 (308); Jennifer Turner 3/49 (20 overs)

Match drawn
Pukekura Park, New Plymouth
Umpires: Bob Pitcairn (NZ) and Graeme Webby (NZ)

- New Zealand Women won the toss and elected to bat.
- Emily Drumm (NZ) made her WTest debut.

== Tri-Series ==
=== Squads ===
New Zealand	Australia	England
Karen Plummer (c); Jackie Clark; Emily Drumm; Shelley Fruin (wk); Karen Gunn; Julie Harris; Debbie Hockley; Yvonne Kainuku; Maia Lewis; Kim McDonald; Sarah McLauchlan; Jennifer Turner; Nancy Williams	Lyn Larsen (c); Denise Annetts; Joanne Broadbent; Karen Brown; Belinda Clark; Kim Fazackerley; Zoe Goss; Sally Griffiths; Belinda Haggett; Lee-Anne Hunter; Tunde Juhasz; Christina Matthews; Sally Moffat (wk)	Helen Plimmer (c); Jan Brittin; Jane Cassar (wk); Jo Chamberlain; Janet Godman; Carole Hodges; Suzie Kitson; Debra Maybury; Sue Metcalfe; Lisa Nye (wk); Karen Smithies; Debra Stock; Janet Tedstone; Wendy Watson

=== Group stage ===
17 January 1992
Scorecard

New Zealand	v	England

Match Abandoned
Basin Reserve, Wellington

- No toss.
- Match abandoned due to rain.
- Points: New Zealand Women 1, England Women 1

18 January 1992
Scorecard

Australia; 192/7 (60 overs)	v	England; 150/9 (60 overs)
Belinda Haggett 59 (117); Carole Hodges 2/28 (12 overs)		Jan Brittin 69 (117); Joanne Broadbent 3/26 (12 overs)

Australia Women won by 42 runs
Basin Reserve, Wellington
Umpires: Doug Davies (NZ) and Evan Watkin (NZ)

- Australia Women won the toss and elected to bat.
- Debra Stock (Eng) made her WODI debut.
- Points: Australia Women 2, England Women 0

20 January 1992
Scorecard

England; 168/9 (60 overs)	v	New Zealand; 126 (56.4 overs)
Carole Hodges 49 (119); Karen Gunn 3/11 (12 overs)		Maia Lewis 29* (73); Jo Chamberlain 3/20 (12 overs)

England Women won by 42 runs
Basin Reserve, Wellington
Umpires: Bill Sommer (NZ) and Danny Rice (NZ)
Player of the match: Carole Hodges (Eng)

- Australia Women won the toss and elected to bat.
- Points: England Women 2, New Zealand Women 0

22 January 1992
Scorecard

England; 178/8 (60 overs)	v	Australia; 179/4 (49 overs)
Jan Brittin 40 (70); Lee-Anne Hunter 2/19 (12 overs)		Belinda Clark 59 (90); Jo Chamberlain 1/20 (12 overs)

Australia Women won by 6 wickets
Dudley Park, Rangiora
Umpires: Graeme Clark (NZ) and Nook Ebert (NZ)
Player of the match: Lee-Anne Hunter (Aus)

- England Women won the toss and elected to bat.
- Points: Australia Women 2, England Women 0

=== Final ===
25 January 1992
Scorecard

Australia; 282/4 (60 overs)	v	England
Denise Annetts 100* (104); Carole Hodges 2/43 (10 overs)

No Result
AMI Stadium, Christchurch
Umpires: Brian Aldridge (NZ) and Rodger McHarg (NZ)

- England Women won the toss and elected to field.
- No further play due to rain.
- Australia won the 1991/92 Shell Tri-Series by virtue of better group stage record.

== Tour of Australia ==
England women's cricket team in Australia in 1991–92
	Australia	England
- Dates: 19 February – 23 February 1992
Captains	Lyn Larsen	Helen Plimmer

Test series
- Result: Australia won the 1-match series 1–0
Most runs	Denise Annetts (148)	Wendy Watson (64)
Most wickets	Isabelle Tsakiris (7); Charmaine Mason (7)	Carole Hodges (2)

=== Squads ===
Australia	England
Lyn Larsen (c); Denise Annetts; Karen Brown; Belinda Clark; Kim Fazackerley; Zoe Goss; Belinda Haggett; Lee-Anne Hunter; Christina Matthews (wk); Charmaine Mason; Isabelle Tsakiris	Helen Plimmer (c); Jan Brittin; Jane Cassar (wk); Jo Chamberlain; Janet Godman; Carole Hodges; Suzie Kitson; Debra Maybury; Sue Metcalfe; Lisa Nye (wk); Karen Smithies; Debra Stock; Janet Tedstone; Wendy Watson

=== Test Match ===
19 – 23 February 1992
Scorecard

England	v	Australia
146 (103.5 overs); Wendy Watson 35 (159); Isabelle Tsakiris 4/27 (27 overs)		346/4d (150 overs); Denise Annetts 148* (375); Carole Hodges 2/65 (38 overs)
115 (102.2 overs); Wendy Watson 29 (115); Isabelle Tsakiris 3/18 (23 overs)

Australia Women won by an innings and 85 runs
North Sydney Oval, Sydney
Umpires: Graham Reed (Aus) and Stevenie Harman (Aus)

- England Women won the toss and elected to bat.
- Jane Cassar, Janet Godman (Eng), Kim Fazackerley, Lee-Anne Hunter, Charmaine Mason and Isabelle Tsakiris (Aus) all made their WTest debuts.

== See also ==
- 1991–92 Shell Tri-Series
