= 1991–92 Shell Tri-Series =

- Date: 17–25 January 1992
- Location: New Zealand
- Result: Australia won the tri-series
Teams
Australia	England	New Zealand
Captains
Lyn Larsen	Helen Plimmer	Karen Plummer
Most runs
Belinda Clark (212)	Jan Brittin (114)	Karen Gunn (116)
Most wickets
Kim Fazackerley (6) Karen Brown (6)	Carole Hodges (5); Janet Tedstone (5)	Karen Gunn (6)

The 1991–92 Shell Tri-Series was a Women's One Day International (WODI) cricket tournament that was held in New Zealand in January 1992. It was a tri-nation series between Australia, England and New Zealand. It was part of England's tour of Australia and New Zealand.

Australia progressed to the final after winning the group with three wins from four matches, joined by England, who finished second. The final ended in a no result due to rain, with Australia therefore winning the tournament as the group winners.

== Squads ==
New Zealand	Australia	England
Karen Plummer (c); Jackie Clark; Emily Drumm; Shelley Fruin (wk); Karen Gunn; Julie Harris; Debbie Hockley; Yvonne Kainuku; Maia Lewis; Kim McDonald; Sarah McLauchlan; Jennifer Turner; Nancy Williams	Lyn Larsen (c); Denise Annetts; Joanne Broadbent; Karen Brown; Belinda Clark; Kim Fazackerley; Zoe Goss; Sally Griffiths; Belinda Haggett; Lee-Anne Hunter; Tunde Juhasz; Christina Matthews; Sally Moffat (wk)	Helen Plimmer (c); Jan Brittin; Jane Cassar (wk); Jo Chamberlain; Janet Godman; Carole Hodges; Suzie Kitson; Debra Maybury; Sue Metcalfe; Lisa Nye (wk); Karen Smithies; Debra Stock; Janet Tedstone; Wendy Watson

== Points table ==
Team	Pld	W	L	T	NR	Pts
Australia (Q)	4	3	1	0	0	6
England (Q)	4	1	2	0	1	3
New Zealand	4	1	2	0	1	3

Source: ESPN Cricinfo

== Fixtures ==
=== 1st ODI ===
17 January 1992
Scorecard

New Zealand	v	England

Match Abandoned
Basin Reserve, Wellington

- No toss.
- Match abandoned due to rain.
- Points: New Zealand Women 1, England Women 1

=== 2nd ODI ===
18 January 1992
Scorecard

Australia; 192/7 (60 overs)	v	England; 150/9 (60 overs)
Belinda Haggett 59 (117); Carole Hodges 2/28 (12 overs)		Jan Brittin 69 (117); Joanne Broadbent 3/26 (12 overs)

Australia Women won by 42 runs
Basin Reserve, Wellington
Umpires: Doug Davies (NZ) and Evan Watkin (NZ)

- Australia Women won the toss and elected to bat.
- Debra Stock (Eng) made her WODI debut.
- Points: Australia Women 2, England Women 0

=== 3rd ODI ===
19 January 1992
Scorecard

New Zealand; 130 (57 overs)	v	Australia; 131/3 (39.3 overs)
Karen Gunn 49 (94); Kim Fazackerley 3/18 (12 overs)		Belinda Clark 51* (103); Karen Gunn 2/33 (8 overs)

Australia Women won by 7 wickets
Basin Reserve, Wellington
Umpires: Bill Sommer (NZ) and Danny Rice (NZ)

- New Zealand Women won the toss and elected to bat.
- Emily Drumm, Maia Lewis, Sarah McLauchlan, Shelley Fruin, Yvonne Kainuku (NZ) and Kim Fazackerley all made their WODI debuts.
- Points: Australia Women 2, New Zealand Women 0

=== 4th ODI ===
20 January 1992
Scorecard

England; 168/9 (60 overs)	v	New Zealand; 126 (56.4 overs)
Carole Hodges 49 (119); Karen Gunn 3/11 (12 overs)		Maia Lewis 29* (73); Jo Chamberlain 3/20 (12 overs)

England Women won by 42 runs
Basin Reserve, Wellington
Umpires: Bill Sommer (NZ) and Danny Rice (NZ)
Player of the match: Carole Hodges (Eng)

- Australia Women won the toss and elected to bat.
- Points: England Women 2, New Zealand Women 0

=== 5th ODI ===
22 January 1992
Scorecard

England; 178/8 (60 overs)	v	Australia; 179/4 (49 overs)
Jan Brittin 40 (70); Lee-Anne Hunter 2/19 (12 overs)		Belinda Clark 59 (90); Jo Chamberlain 1/20 (12 overs)

Australia Women won by 6 wickets
Dudley Park, Rangiora
Umpires: Graeme Clark (NZ) and Nook Ebert (NZ)
Player of the match: Lee-Anne Hunter (Aus)

- England Women won the toss and elected to bat.
- Points: Australia Women 2, England Women 0

=== 6th ODI ===
23 January 1992
Scorecard

Australia; 190/7 (60 overs)	v	New Zealand; 191/7 (53.4 overs)
Lee-Anne Hunter 47 (62); Julie Harris 2/55 (12 overs)		Debbie Hockley 57 (74); Karen Brown 2/24 (12 overs)

New Zealand Women won by 3 wickets
Hagley Oval, Christchurch
Umpires: Graeme Clark (NZ) and Nook Ebert (NZ)

- New Zealand Women won the toss and elected to field.
- Points: New Zealand Women 2, Australia Women 0

== Final ==
25 January 1992
Scorecard

Australia; 282/4 (60 overs)	v	England
Denise Annetts 100* (104); Carole Hodges 2/43 (10 overs)

No Result
AMI Stadium, Christchurch
Umpires: Brian Aldridge (NZ) and Rodger McHarg (NZ)

- England Women won the toss and elected to field.
- No further play due to rain.
- Australia won the 1991/92 Shell Tri-Series by virtue of better group stage record.

== See also ==
- English women's cricket team in Australia and New Zealand in 1991–92
