= Australia women's cricket team in New Zealand in 1989–90 =

Australian women's cricket team

	New Zealand	Australia
- Dates: 18 January – 11 February 1990
Captains	Lesley Murdoch	Lyn Larsen

Test series
- Result: Australia won the 3-match series 1–0
Most runs	Debbie Hockley (213)	Belinda Haggett (167)
Most wickets	Jennifer Turner (8)	Debbie Wilson (14)

One Day International series
- Results: Australia won the 3-match series 2–1
Most runs	Debbie Hockley (87)	Denise Annetts (87)
Most wickets	Karen Gunn (6)	Karen Brown (5)

The Australia women's national cricket team toured New Zealand in January and February 1990. They first played against New Zealand in three Test matches, winning the series 1–0. They then played against New Zealand in three One Day Internationals, which were competed for the Rose Bowl, winning the series 2–1.

== Squads ==
New Zealand	Australia
Lesley Murdoch (c); Catherine Campbell; Jackie Clark; Kirsty Flavell; Karen Gunn; Julie Harris; Debbie Hockley; Ingrid Jagersma (wk); Brigit Legg; Penny Kinsella; Jennifer Turner; Nicki Turner	Lyn Larsen (c); Denise Annetts; Joanne Broadbent; Karen Brown; Zoe Goss; Sally Griffiths; Belinda Haggett; Christina Matthews (wk); Andrea McCauley; Sally Moffat; Melissa Papworth; Katherine Raymont; Debbie Wilson

== Tour Matches ==
=== 60-over match: New Zealand Emerging Players v Australia ===
23 January 1990
Scorecard

Australia; 239/3 (60 overs)	v	New Zealand Emerging Players; 145/9 (60 overs)
Zoe Goss 91* (107); Nancy Williams 1/42 (12 overs)		Kirsty Flavell 81* (161); Andrea McCauley 3/23 (10 overs)

Australia Women won by 94 runs
Fitzherbert Park, Palmerston North

- Toss not known.

=== 50-over match: Canterbury Women's Invitation XI v Australia ===
8 February 1990
Scorecard

Canterbury Women's Invitation XI; 124/9 (50 overs)	v	Australia; 125/1 (40.5 overs)
Lisa Astle 21 (47); Karen Brown 2/14 (2 overs)		Belinda Haggett 60* (127); Delwyn Brownlee 1/33 (6 overs)

Australia Women won by 9 wickets
Aorangi Oval, Timaru

- Australia Women won the toss and elected to field.

== WTest Series ==
=== 1st Test ===
18 – 21 January 1990
Scorecard

Australia	v	New Zealand
371 (180.3 overs); Sally Griffiths 133 (–); Catherine Campbell 3/106 (44 overs)		229 (151.1 overs); Debbie Hockley 126* (–); Debbie Wilson 4/58 (34 overs)
52/1 (37 overs); Belinda Haggett 27* (–)

Match drawn
Cornwall Park, Auckland
Umpires: CB Paul (NZ) and Malcolm Glenny (NZ)

- New Zealand Women won the toss and elected to field.
- Joanne Broadbent, Andrea McCauley, Katherine Raymont (Aus), Catherine Campbell, Julie Harris, Penny Kinsella, Brigit Legg and Jennifer Turner (NZ) all made their WTest debuts.

=== 2nd Test ===
26 – 29 January 1990
Scorecard

Australia	v	New Zealand
325/9d (147 overs); Belinda Haggett 70 (–); Julie Harris 2/53 (28 overs)		198/7 (125 overs); Nicki Turner 65* (–); Lyn Larsen 3/22 (19 overs)

Match drawn
Basin Reserve, Wellington
Umpires: Bryan Malin (NZ) and Evan Watkin (NZ)

- Australia Women won the toss and elected to bat.
- Sally Moffat (Aus) made her WTest debut.

=== 3rd Test ===
26 – 29 January 1990
Scorecard

New Zealand	v	Australia
197/9d (117.2 overs); Debbie Hockley 77 (–); Debbie Wilson 4/50 (27.2 overs)		292/9d (127 overs); Karen Brown 65 (–); Jennifer Turner 3/62 (28 overs)
152 (123.4 overs); Catherine Campbell 29 (–); Debbie Wilson 5/42 (29.4 overs)		58/2 (23 overs); Katherine Raymont 23 (–); Karen Gunn 1/14 (5 overs)

Australia Women won by 8 wickets
Hagley Oval, Christchurch
Umpires: Nook Ebert (NZ) and Pat Carrick (NZ)

- New Zealand Women won the toss and elected to bat.

== WODI Series ==
=== 1st ODI ===
6 February 1990
Scorecard

New Zealand; 200 (60 overs)	v	Australia; 201/7 (58.2 overs)
Debbie Hockley 56 (–); Debbie Wilson 2/24 (12 overs)		Denise Annetts 75 (–); Brigit Legg 2/25 (11.2 overs)

Australia Women won by 3 wickets
Lancaster Park, Christchurch
Umpires: Dave Quested (NZ) and Pat Carrick (NZ)

- New Zealand Women won the toss and elected to bat.
- Joanne Broadbent, Andrea McCauley and Melissa Papworth (Aus) all made their WODI debuts.

=== 2nd ODI ===
10 February 1990
Scorecard

Australia; 122 (54 overs)	v	New Zealand; 123/2 (49.4 overs)
Debbie Wilson 29* (–); Karen Gunn 5/22 (9 overs)		Lesley Murdoch 48* (–); Karen Brown 1/12 (9 overs)

New Zealand Women won by 8 wickets
Hutt Recreation Ground, Lower Hutt
Umpires: Danny Rice (NZ) and Doug Davies (NZ)

- Australia Women won the toss and elected to bat.

=== 3rd ODI ===
11 February 1990
Scorecard

Australia; 168 (60 overs)	v	New Zealand; 111 (55.2 overs)
Zoe Goss 50 (–); Julie Harris 2/18 (12 overs)		Kirsty Flavell 26 (–); Lyn Larsen 3/19 (12 overs)

Australia Women won by 57 runs
Hutt Recreation Ground, Lower Hutt
Umpires: Bryan Malin (NZ) and Danny Rice (NZ)

- Australia Women won the toss and elected to bat.
- Katherine Raymont (Aus) made her WODI debut.
