= New Zealand women's cricket team in Australia in 1992–93 =

	Australia	New Zealand
- Dates: 13 – 17 January 1993
Captains	Lyn Larsen	Sarah Illingworth

One Day International series
- Results: Australia won the 3-match series 2–1
Most runs	Belinda Clark (172)	Penny Kinsella (84)
Most wickets	Joanne Broadbent (5)	Karen Gunn (4); Catherine Campbell (4)
- Player of the series: Belinda Clark (Aus); Denise Annetts (Aus)

The New Zealand women's national cricket team toured Australia in January 1993. They played against Australia in three One Day International (ODI) matches, which were to contest the Rose Bowl. Australia won the series 2–1.

== Squads ==
Australia	New Zealand
Lyn Larsen (c); Denise Annetts; Sharyn Bow; Joanne Broadbent; Karen Brown; Bronwyn Calver; Belinda Clark; Zoe Goss; Sally Griffiths; Belinda Haggett; Lee-Anne Hunter; Christina White (wk)	Sarah Illingworth (c) (wk); Trudy Anderson; Kirsty Bond; Catherine Campbell; Emily Drumm; Karen Gunn; Julie Harris; Penny Kinsella; Maia Lewis; Sarah McLauchlan; Karen Musson; Jennifer Turner

== ODI Series ==
=== 1st ODI ===
13 January 1993
Scorecard

Australia; 188/2 (50 overs)	v	New Zealand; 102 (44.2 overs)
Denise Annetts 63 (72); Catherine Campbell 1/41 (9 overs)		Kirsty Flavell 23 (83); Joanne Broadbent 5/10 (6.2 overs)

Australia won by 86 runs
Oakes Oval, Lismore
Umpires: Stevenie Harman (Aus) and Arthur Watson (Aus)

- Australia won the toss and elected to bat.
- Trudy Anderson (NZ) made her ODI debut.

=== 2nd ODI ===
16 January 1993
Scorecard

New Zealand; 160/6 (50 overs)	v	Australia; 161/1 (42.2 overs)
Penny Kinsella 57 (118); Sharyn Bow 3/34 (10 overs)		Belinda Clark 80* (111); Catherine Campbell 1/32 (10 overs)

Australia won by 9 wickets
The Gabba, Brisbane
Umpires: Peter Parker (Aus) and Michael Ralston (Aus)

- New Zealand won the toss and elected to bat.
- Sharyn Bow (Aus) and Karen Musson (NZ) both made their ODI debuts.

=== 3rd ODI ===
17 January 1993
Scorecard

Australia; 170/8 (50 overs)	v	New Zealand; 171/5 (49.1 overs)
Belinda Clark 36 (84); Karen Gunn 4/41 (10 overs)		Sarah Illingworth 43* (54); Bronwyn Calver 2/27 (9 overs)

New Zealand won by 5 wickets
The Gabba, Brisbane
Umpires: Peter Parker (Aus) and Tony McQuillan (Aus)

- Australia won the toss and elected to bat.
