= 1988 Women's Cricket World Cup final =

Cricket match

1988 Women's Cricket World Cup Final
- Event: 1988 Women's Cricket World Cup
England	Australia
(England)	(Australia)
127/7	129/2
60 overs	44.5 overs
- Australia won by 8 wickets
- Date: 18 December 1988
- Venue: Melbourne Cricket Ground, Melbourne, Australia
- Umpires: Robin Bailhache (Aus) and Len King (Aus)
- Attendance: 3,326

The 1988 Women's Cricket World Cup Final was a one-day cricket match between Australia and England played on 18 December 1988 at the Melbourne Cricket Ground in Melbourne, Australia. It marked the culmination of the 1988 Women's Cricket World Cup, the fourth edition of the tournament. Both Australia and England had previously won the competition; England won the inaugural tournament in 1973, while Australia won in both 1978 and 1982. Australia won the match by eight wickets to claim their third world title.

Australia and England finished first and second in the league-stage to claim their places in the final. England batted first in the final, but were hindered by a slow outfield, and found scoring difficult. The humid conditions helped Australia's spin bowlers, Lyn Fullston and Lyn Larsen, who combined for five wickets. Jan Brittin top-scored for England with 46 runs, as they made 127 for seven. In response, Australia initially struggled, losing two early wickets for 14 runs. An unbroken partnership of 115 runs between Lindsay Reeler and Denise Annetts saw Australia to victory with more than 15 overs remaining.

== Background ==
The 1988 Women's Cricket World Cup was the fourth Women's Cricket World Cup. The first had been held in 1973, pre-dating the first men's Cricket World Cup by two years. The 1988 tournament featured five teams; Australia, England, Ireland, the Netherlands and New Zealand. It took place between 29 November and 18 December 1988, featuring 22 matches over 20 days. England had won the first World Cup on home soil, before Australia claimed both the next two. Neither of the first two tournaments had featured a final, but had rather been league competitions, in which the team which finished with the most points won. Australia had defeated England by three wickets in the final of the 1982 World Cup.

== Route to the final ==
Each team played eight matches during the round-robin stage of the tournament, facing each other twice. The top two teams would progress directly to the final. Australia won all but one of their matches. Their 255-run win over the Netherlands on the opening day of the tournament remained the largest win by runs until 1997. Australia's only loss came against England, who beat them by 15 runs. Australia's opening batters, Lindsay Reeler and Ruth Buckstein, scored four of the five centuries made during the tournament; Reeler's 108 not out against New Zealand was the only one that was not scored against the Netherlands. England won six of their matches, and lost two; against Australia and New Zealand. Australia finished top of the group with 28 points, followed by England whose 24 points were four more than New Zealand in third. Ireland and the Netherlands were well behind, with 8 and 0 points respectively.

== Match ==
=== Summary ===
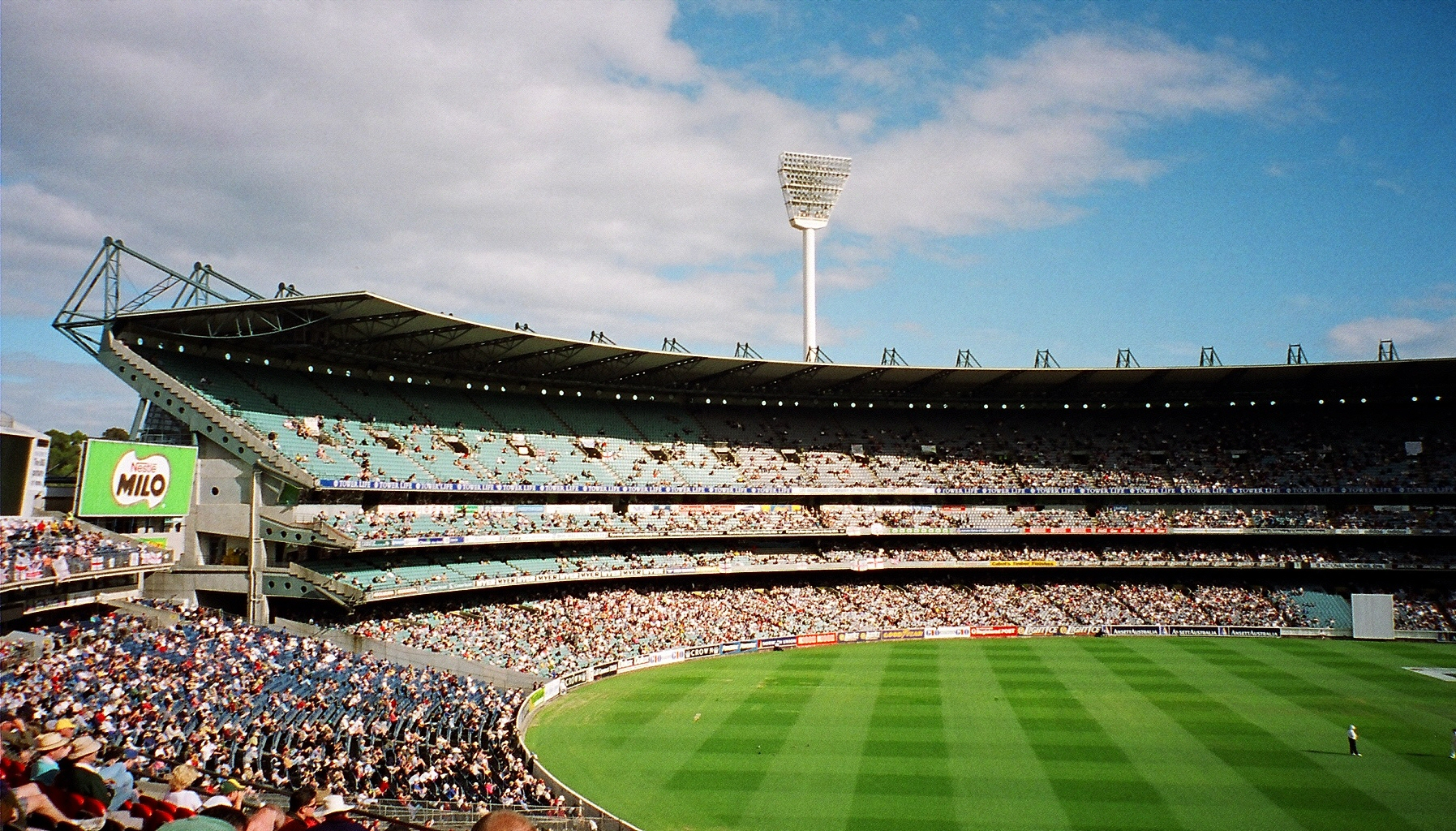
The Melbourne Cricket Ground hosted the final. (Pictured during the 1998 Boxing Day Test.)

The final was held at the Melbourne Cricket Ground, in Melbourne, Australia, on 18 December 1988. The match was broadcast live on radio and on ABC Television in Australia, and in front of a crowd of 3,326. The Melbourne Cricket Ground was a large ground, capable of seating 90,000 people; England's Jan Brittin later said: "The ground was wall-to-wall seating with no one sitting in them, which didn't lend itself to a big-match atmosphere." There had been a thunderstorm overnight, and the rain had left the outfield very wet. The England captain, Jane Powell, won the toss and decided to bat first. Her decision was primarily based on Australia's public aversion to batting second, and having to chase a target. Heather Smith of The Sydney Morning Herald suggested that, due to the wet conditions, "England may have unwittingly helped their own downfall".

Carole Hodges and Wendy Watson opened the batting for England, and neither scored a run until the sixth over; the only runs attributed to England before that were wides bowled by the Australians, which The Age attributed to the "excitement of playing on the MCG for the first time". After 25 overs, England had scored 40 runs without losing a wicket, but both openers were frustrated by the slow run-rate. Watson was dismissed two overs later for 17; playing an aggressive shot, she was caught by Denise Annetts at cover off the bowling of Lyn Fullston. She had shared a 42-run opening partnership with Hodges, but John Woodcock of The Times complained that they "lacked pace between the wickets, when something very spritely was needed". England added ten more runs before Hodges was bowled by a delivery from Lyn Larsen which dislodged her off-bail. Hodges had scored 23, and England were 52 for two. Three of England's middle-order batters were dismissed for low scores: their captain, Powell, was caught behind off Larsen's bowling for one run; Karen Hicken was bowled by Fullston for five; Janet Aspinall was caught and bowled by Fullston for two. Brittin, who had come to the crease when Watson was out, remained not out; England were 74 for five.

After lunch, Brittin and Jo Chamberlain scored more quickly for England, earning praise from both The Sydney Morning Herald and The Times, but after putting on 26 runs together, Chamberlain was run out for 14 after the ball deflected off the bowler. Woodcock suggested that Brittin was England's only remaining hope. Patsy Lovell was trapped leg before wicket for four runs, while Suzie Kitson remained one not out at the end of the innings. Brittin had made England's highest score, 46 not out. Woodcock said that: "It was a pity, really, that Brittin had not got in before the 27th over, with the touch she has." England scored 127 runs, a total The Sydney Morning Herald said "was never going to be enough". Throughout their 60-over innings, England scored two boundaries. In humid conditions, they especially struggled against spin bowling; Fullston took three wickets and allowed 29 runs, while Larsen took two wickets for 22. The wet outfield also slowed scoring; this dried as the match went on, giving Australia the better of the batting conditions. In the Wisden Cricketers' Almanack, Carol Salmon estimated that the slow outfield cost England between 20 and 30 runs.

Aspinall, who opened the bowling for England, struggled for accuracy; conceding extras, particularly wides, had been a problem for England all tournament and the final was no exception. In spite of this, England made an early breakthrough: Chamberlain, who according to The Age "worried the Australians with her accurate medium-pacers", trapped the Australian opener Buckstein leg before wicket without scoring in the second over. Australia's next batter, Sharlene Heywood only scored five runs in nine minutes until confusion between herself and Reeler led to Heywood being run out, leaving Australia on 14 for two. Annetts joined Reeler at the crease, and early in her innings was criticised by The Age for "[dangling] a dangerously limp bat". Reeler was troubled by the quicker bowling of Kitson, and in the 14th over, England were convinced that they had dismissed her, caught behind, but the umpire turned down the appeal. Reeler claimed the ball had clipped her pads, rather than her bat, before being caught by the wicket-keeper. After the appeal, Reeler played more circumspectly for a while, before taking the offensive with "elegant driving and delicate cutting", according to The Age. In contrast to Reeler's technical style, Annetts played powerful shots, predominantly into the leg side. Reeler brought up her 50 and Australia's 100 from successive deliveries; the first a cover drive which went for a boundary, and the second an on drive. Annetts secured victory with a pull through the on side. Reeler finished with 59 runs, and Annetts with 48. The pair shared an unbroken 115-run partnership, and secured victory for Australia with eight wickets and more than 15 overs remaining.

=== Scorecard ===
- Toss: England won the toss and elected to field first
- Result: Australia won by eight wickets

England batting innings
Batsman	Method of dismissal	Runs	Balls	SR
Carole Hodges	b Lyn Larsen	23	89	25.84
Wendy Watson	c Denise Annetts b Lyn Fullston	17	86	19.77
Jan Brittin	not out	46	108	42.59
Jane Powell *	c Christina Matthews † b Lyn Larsen	1	9	11.11
Karen Hicken	b Lyn Fullston	5	27	18.52
Janet Aspinall	c & b Lyn Fullston	2	13	15.38
Jo Chamberlain	run out	14	19	73.68
Patsy Lovell	lbw b Zoe Goss	4	9	44.44
Suzie Kitson	not out	1	10	10.00
Extras	(4 leg byes, 10 wides)	14		
Totals	(60 overs)	127/7	2.11 runs per over	
Did not bat: Lisa Nye †, Gill Smith

Australia bowling
Bowler	Overs	Maidens	Runs	Wickets	Economy
Zoe Goss	12	4	33	1	2.75
Karen Brown	12	2	15	0	1.25
Sharon Tredrea	12	1	24	0	2.00
Lyn Larsen	12	1	22	2	1.83
Lyn Fullston	12	3	29	3	2.41

Australia batting innings
Batsman	Method of dismissal	Runs	Balls	SR
Lindsay Reeler	not out	59	147	40.14
Ruth Buckstein	lbw b Jo Chamberlain	0	3	0.00
Sharlene Heywood	run out	5	7	71.43
Denise Annetts	not out	48	127	37.80
Extras	(3 leg byes, 14 wides)	17		
Totals	(44.5 overs)	129/2	2.87 runs per over	
Did not bat: Belinda Haggett, Sharon Tredrea, Lyn Larsen *, Christina Matthews †, Zoe Goss, Karen Brown, Lyn Fullston

England bowling
Bowler	Overs	Maidens	Runs	Wickets	Economy
Janet Aspinall	4	0	16	0	4.00
Jo Chamberlain	8	1	23	1	2.87
Carole Hodges	4	1	14	0	3.50
Gill Smith	8	4	11	0	1.37
Karen Smithies	10	2	23	0	2.30
Patsy Lovell	6	2	23	0	3.83
Suzie Kitson	4.5	0	16	0	3.31

Umpires:

- Robin Bailhache and Len King

Key

- * – Captain
- † – Wicket-keeper
- c Fielder – Indicates that the batsman was dismissed by a catch by the named fielder
- b Bowler – Indicates which bowler gains credit for the dismissal
- c & b Bowler – Indicates that the batsman was dismissed by a catch by the bowler

== Aftermath ==
Reeler finished the tournament as the leading run-scorer, with 448 runs, while for the second successive World Cup, Fullston took the most wickets, with 16. After the tournament, Sharon Tredrea, Australia's vice-captain and former captain, announced her retirement. She was the only player who had appeared in all four World Cups. Between them, Australia and England have won ten of the eleven Women's Cricket World Cups; only in 2000 did one of the pair fail to win, when New Zealand beat Australia in the final.
