= New Zealand women's cricket team in Australia in 1990–91 =

New Zealand women's cricket team

	Australia	New Zealand
- Dates: 17 – 20 January 1991
Captains	Lyn Larsen	Debbie Hockley

One Day International series
- Results: Australia won the 3-match series 2–1
Most runs	Belinda Haggett (150)	Kirsty Flavell (107)
Most wickets	Zoe Goss (8)	Jennifer Turner (6)

The New Zealand women's national cricket team toured Australia in January 1991. They played against Australia in three One Day Internationals, which were to contest the Rose Bowl. Australia won the series 2–1.

== Squads ==
Australia	New Zealand
Lyn Larsen (c); Denise Annetts; Joanne Broadbent; Karen Brown; Bronwyn Calver; Belinda Clark; Zoe Goss; Belinda Haggett; Sharlene Heywood; Tunde Juhasz (wk); Sally Moffat; Kerry Saunders; Debbie Wilson	Debbie Hockley (c); Catherine Campbell; Jackie Clark; Kirsty Flavell; Karen Gunn; Julie Harris; Sarah Illingworth (wk); Kim McDonald; Jennifer Turner; Nicki Turner; Nancy Williams

== WODI Series ==
=== 1st ODI ===
17 January 1991
Scorecard

New Zealand; 158/8 (60 overs)	v	Australia; 159/2 (57.3 overs)
Kirsty Flavell 54 (–); Zoe Goss 3/30 (12 overs)		Belinda Haggett 80 (–); Jennifer Turner 1/33 (11 overs)

Australia Women won by 8 wickets
Bellerive Oval, Hobart
Umpires: PT Clark (Aus) and Steve Randell (Aus)

- New Zealand Women won the toss and elected to bat.
- Bronwyn Calver, Belinda Clark, Tunde Juhasz (Aus) and Kim McDonald (NZ) all made their WODI debuts.

=== 2nd ODI ===
19 January 1991
Scorecard

Australia; 180 (59.1 overs)	v	New Zealand; 94 (48.2 overs)
Belinda Haggett 70 (–); Jennifer Turner 3/35 (12 overs)		Karen Gunn 29 (–); Joanne Broadbent 3/17 (12 overs)

Australia Women won by 86 runs
Melbourne Grammar School, Melbourne
Umpires: Bill Sheahan (Aus) and Stephen Walpole (Aus)

- Australia Women won the toss and elected to bat.

=== 3rd ODI ===
20 January 1991
Scorecard

Australia; 167/9 (60 overs)	v	New Zealand; 171/5 (59.3 overs)
Denise Annetts 67 (–); Karen Gunn 2/10 (12 overs)		Debbie Hockley 76* (–); Zoe Goss 2/27 (12 overs)

New Zealand Women won by 5 wickets
Albert Cricket Ground, Melbourne
Umpires: Darrell Holt (Aus) and Tony Chapman (Aus)

- New Zealand Women won the toss and elected to field.
