= 1993 Women's Cricket World Cup final =

Cricket match

1993 Women's Cricket World Cup Final
- Event: 1993 Women's Cricket World Cup
England	New Zealand
(England)	(New Zealand)
195/5	128
60 overs	55.1 overs
- England won by 67 runs
- Date: 1 August 1993
- Venue: Lord's, London, England
- Player of the match: Jo Chamberlain (Eng)
- Umpires: Valerie Gibbens (Eng) and Judith West (Eng)
- Attendance: 5,000

The 1993 Women's Cricket World Cup Final was a one-day cricket match between England and New Zealand played on 1 August 1993 at Lord's in London, England. It marked the culmination of the 1993 Women's Cricket World Cup, the fifth edition of the tournament. England won the final by 67 runs, clinching their second World Cup title; their first since the inaugural tournament in 1973. It was England's third appearance in a World Cup final, while New Zealand made their debut at this stage of the tournament.

New Zealand remained unbeaten through the round-robin league stage of the tournament, while England only lost once: to New Zealand. They finished first and second in the league to qualify directly for the final. New Zealand were considered slight favourites for the final. The New Zealand captain, Sarah Illingworth, won the toss, and opted to field first. England scored patiently throughout most of their innings; Jan Brittin and Carole Hodges had a partnership of 85, before runs were added more quickly towards the end, led by 38 runs from 33 balls by the English all-rounder Jo Chamberlain. England finished on 195 for five. In their response, New Zealand regularly lost wickets. Debbie Hockley getting run out just before the tea interval was identified as a key moment for England, who eventually bowled New Zealand out for 128 to secure victory. Chamberlain was named as player of the match, for her all-round performance.

== Background ==
The 1993 Women's Cricket World Cup was the fifth Women's Cricket World Cup. The first had been held in 1973, pre-dating the first men's Cricket World Cup by two years. The 1993 tournament featured eight teams; Australia, Denmark, England, India, Ireland, Netherlands, New Zealand and the West Indies. It took place between 20 July and 1 August, featuring 29 matches over 13 days. England had won the first World Cup on home soil, before Australia won each of the next three, beating England in the 1982 and 1988 finals.

== Route to the final ==
Each team played seven matches during the round-robin stage of the tournament, facing each other once. The top two teams would progress directly to the final. England started their campaign against Denmark. Aided by a hat-trick from Carole Hodges—both the first by an Englishwoman in international cricket, and the first at any Women's World Cup—England won by 239 runs; at the time, the second-biggest winning margin in Women's One Day International cricket. In their second match, they faced New Zealand, who only managed to score 127 runs batting first. However, in response, New Zealand enacted five run outs to help secure a 25-run victory. The New Zealand captain, Sarah Illingworth recalled: "As captain that day I felt as if I knew what was going to happen before it did in the field. [It was the] best fielding performance I’ve ever been involved in." The English cricket writer, Raf Nicholson, blamed England rather than praised New Zealand, saying that England "threw away the game with five suicidal run-outs and unnecessary slogging in between". England subsequently beat Ireland by 162 runs—during which Hodges and Helen Plimmer both scored centuries for England—and narrowly defeated India, who had only needed four runs to win when their last batter was dismissed. Their results meant that England had to beat Australia to give themselves a realistic chance of reaching the final. England scored 208 for five; aided by another century from Hodges, and then five wickets by Gill Smith helped England to bowl Australia out for 165. England convincingly won their final two group matches; a four-wicket win over the West Indies, with more than 13 overs remaining, and a 133-run win over the Netherlands.

New Zealand opened their tournament against Ireland, achieving a seven-wicket win after restricting the Irish to 82 for six from their reduced allocation of 39 overs. After beating England in their second match, New Zealand secured another large victory, defeating Denmark by nine wickets after bowling them out for 93 runs. New Zealand's bowlers dominated again in the next match: Jennifer Turner took five wickets and conceded only five runs as the Netherlands were bowled out for 40, at the time the third-lowest score in Women's One Day Internationals. During New Zealand's next match, a seven-wicket win over the West Indies, Julie Harris took New Zealand's first hat-trick in Women's One Day Internationals. In their penultimate group match, New Zealand were restricted to 154 runs by India, but three run outs and economic bowling helped them to a 42-run victory. New Zealand faced Australia in their final group match: victory would ensure them a place in the final, but a loss would leave Australia, England and New Zealand all on the same number of points, and run rate would have to be used to determine which teams reached the final. No such tie-breaker was needed; New Zealand bowled Australia out for 77 runs, which as of 2020 remains their lowest total in Women's One Day Internationals. New Zealand reached their target without loss to win by ten wickets. Having won all of their matches, New Zealand finished top of the league on 28 points, while England finished second with 24 points.

== Match ==
=== Summary ===
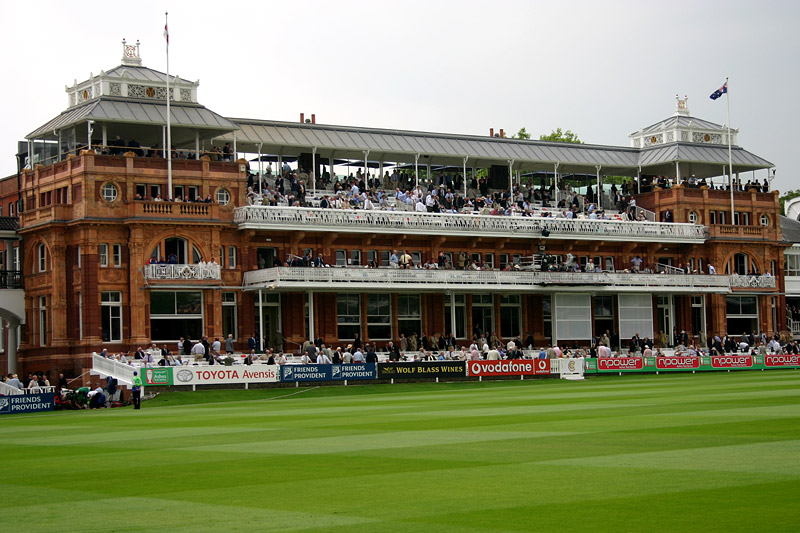
Lord's hosted the final. (Pavilion pictured during the 2005 Ashes series.)

The final was played on a "clear and bright" day at Lord's cricket ground in London. Although Lord's is famously described as "the home of cricket", it was only the third time that a women's One Day International had been played at the ground. At the time of the match, women were not allowed to be members of the Marylebone Cricket Club (the MCC; who owned the ground), nor were they allowed in the pavilion. The BBC made a late schedule change to broadcast the match live on Grandstand, where it attracted 2.5 million viewers. The match began at 10:45 BST, and was played in front of a crowd of around 5,000 people, who were all on one side of the ground, as the MCC kept the other side closed.

The New Zealand captain, Illingworth, won the toss and chose to field first. Jan Brittin and Wendy Watson opened the batting for England; Watson was dropped in the first over, but only added five runs before being bowled by Sarah McLauchlan. That wicket brought Hodges to the crease: Brittin and Hodges were the leading run-scorers during the tournament, and Alan Lee of The Times described their partnership as "accomplished and assured" as they patiently put on 85 runs together. During her innings, Brittin became the first player to score 1,000 runs in Women's World Cup matches. Brittin was dismissed 15 minutes before lunch, caught at mid-wicket by Karen Gunn off the bowling of McLauchlan for 48 runs, leaving England 96 for two. After the wicket, Hodges and Plimmer scored 18 runs in just under 10 overs before both were dismissed in quick succession: Hodges was stumped by Illingworth off the bowling of Catherine Campbell for 45, while Plimmer was run out for 11. Their wickets brought Jo Chamberlain and Barbara Daniels in to bat. The pair played more positively, working the ball into gaps in the field and taking quick singles. Chamberlain was dropped when she had scored seven runs: in all, New Zealand dropped four catches during the final, in stark contrast to the excellent fielding that had earned them plaudits during the group stage. Chamberlain scored 38 runs from 33 deliveries before missing the ball while aiming a big shot at the Tavern Stand, and being bowled by Julie Harris. She was given a standing ovation by the MCC members as she walked off the pitch. Daniels and Karen Smithies added another 20 runs in the final few overs to take England to 195 for five: they scored 81 of their 195 runs from the last 12 overs.

New Zealand opened the batting with Penny Kinsella and Debbie Hockley; England started with the medium pace bowling of Clare Taylor at one end, and the off spin of Hodges at the other. Writing for The Guardian, Mike Selvey said that the use of Hodges "at a stroke [rendered] Debbie Hockley both moribund and, with helmet, grill and armguard, faintly ridiculous." Kinsella was the first wicket to fall, caught behind by Jane Smit off the bowling of Taylor for 15. Hockley and Kirsty Bond then built a partnership, taking the score on to 51 for one before Chamberlain was introduced into the bowling attack, and Bond was soon "brilliantly caught by Suzy Kitson at gully", according to Martin Williamson of ESPNcricinfo. Hockley and Maia Lewis began to rebuild the New Zealand innings, but after adding nine runs in seven overs, the left-handed Chamberlain hit the stumps with a right-arm throw to run out Hockley for 24, a moment identified as the turning point of the match by both Selvey and Taylor. Tea was taken after 30 overs of the New Zealand innings. Shortly thereafter two more wickets fell: Illingworth was caught and bowled by Smithies for 4, while Emily Drumm was caught by Chamberlain off the bowling of Smith for a duck. From 55 for one, New Zealand had collapsed to 71 for five. Lewis and Gunn added 39 runs together, but once Lewis was dismissed for 28, trapped leg before wicket by Smith, New Zealand subsided, and were bowled out for 128. England won by 67 runs, and secured their second World Cup title.

=== Scorecard ===
- Toss: New Zealand won the toss and elected to field first
- Result: England won by 67 runs

England batting innings
Batsman	Method of dismissal	Runs	Balls	SR
Jan Brittin	c Karen Gunn b Sarah McLauchlan	48	117	41.02
Wendy Watson	b Sarah McLauchlan	5	25	20.00
Carole Hodges	c Sarah Illingworth † b Catherine Campbell	45	119	37.81
Helen Plimmer	run out	11	30	36.66
Jo Chamberlain	b Julie Harris	38	33	115.15
Barbara Daniels	not out	21	27	77.77
Karen Smithies *	not out	10	9	111.11
Extras	(8 byes, 7 leg byes, 2 wides)	17		
Totals	(60 overs)	195/5	3.25 runs per over	
Did not bat: Jane Smit †, Clare Taylor, Gill Smith, Suzie Kitson

New Zealand bowling
Bowler	Overs	Maidens	Runs	Wickets	Economy
Jennifer Turner	8	1	32	0	4.00
Julie Harris	12	3	31	1	2.58
Sarah McLauchlan	10	2	25	2	2.50
Catherine Campbell	12	2	45	1	3.75
Karen Gunn	12	5	33	0	2.75
Emily Drumm	6	1	14	0	2.33

New Zealand batting innings
Batsman	Method of dismissal	Runs	Balls	SR
Penny Kinsella	c Jane Smit † b Clare Taylor	15	35	42.85
Debbie Hockley	run out	24	64	37.50
Kirsty Bond	c Suzie Kitson b Jo Chamberlain	12	38	31.57
Maia Lewis	lbw b Clare Taylor	28	87	32.18
Sarah Illingworth * †	c & b Karen Smithies	4	10	40.00
Emily Drumm	c Jo Chamberlain b Gill Smith	0	4	0.00
Karen Gunn	b Gill Smith	19	46	41.30
Sarah McLauchlan	c Jan Brittin b Suzie Kitson	0	5	0.00
Jennifer Turner	c Clare Taylor b Gill Smith	2	17	11.76
Julie Harris	not out	5	12	41.66
Catherine Campbell	c Jan Brittin b Suzie Kitson	6	13	46.15
Extras	(8 leg byes, 5 wides)	13		
Totals	(55.1 overs)	128	2.32 runs per over	

England bowling
Bowler	Overs	Maidens	Runs	Wickets	Economy
Clare Taylor	12	3	27	2	2.25
Carole Hodges	5	2	11	0	2.20
Jo Chamberlain	9	2	28	1	3.11
Karen Smithies	12	4	14	1	1.16
Gill Smith	12	1	29	3	2.41
Suzie Kitson	5.1	1	11	2	2.12

Umpires:

- Valerie Gibbens and Judith West

Key

- * – Captain
- † – Wicket-keeper
- c Fielder – Indicates that the batsman was dismissed by a catch by the named fielder
- b Bowler – Indicates which bowler gains credit for the dismissal
- c & b Bowler – Indicates that the batsman was dismissed by a catch by the bowler

== Aftermath ==
"It was her violently struck 38 from 33 balls that lifted the England innings above dangerous mediocrity. It was her lively left-arm bowling that ended the most threatening stand in the New Zealand reply and her direct hit from cover, athletically precise, that terminated the innings of the prolific Debbie Hockley and, with it, the contest."

— Alan Lee's description of Jo Chamberlain in The Times

Chamberlain was selected as the player of the match: in The Times, Lee said that "she did all but everything", praising her batting, bowling and fielding performances alike. In The Guardian, Selvey said that she had put in an "unstinting all-round performance". The consensus was that New Zealand had been overwhelmed by their nerves in the final; one of the New Zealand players, Campbell said "We weren't very experienced at finals, and we choked." Throughout the group stage, New Zealand had never had to chase more than 96 runs, so their middle and lower order batters had not had much match practice in English conditions. Before the match, England's women had received a good luck message from the England men's team, who had just lost the Ashes to Australia. Smithies, speaking after the victory, aimed a good-natured dig at them; "Perhaps they could learn a few things from this."

England's victory gave women's cricket unprecedented coverage in the English press; it was featured in all the national newspapers, and was even on the front pages of some. There was an item on the win in the BBC Evening News. The England captain, Smithies, reflected that the response surprised her; "It changed my life completely for about six months ... It lit up women's cricket again."

In amongst all the plaudits were a few notes of caution; Lee suggested that "This final illustrated the athleticism of the game and the status to which it can aspire; what is needed now is firmer and more enterprising administration." Former England player Sarah Potter said "Progress has been held back by lack of hard cash and column inches, and buckets of male condescension." England failed to reach another World Cup final until 2009, when they once again beat New Zealand. New Zealand faced Australia in the final in both 1997 and 2000; losing the first and winning the second.
