= Australia women's cricket team in England in 1987 =

Australian women's cricket team in England in 1987
	England	Australia
- Dates: 8 July – 29 August 1987
Captains	Carole Hodges	Lyn Larsen

Test series
- Result: Australia won the 3-match series 1–0
Most runs	Carole Hodges (152)	Denise Annetts (352)
Most wickets	Gillian McConway (8)	Jenny Owens (14)

One Day International series
- Results: 3-match series drawn 1–1
Most runs	Jacqueline Court (77)	Lindsay Reeler (129)
Most wickets	Sarah Potter (3)	Lyn Fullston (4)

The Australian women's cricket team toured England 8 July – 29 August 1987 to contest The Women's Ashes for the tenth time. Australia won the three match Test series 1–0 to retain the Ashes.

Prior to the Test series, a three match WODI series was drawn at one match each. Australia also played 15 tour matches – winning 8, losing none, drawing 3, 1 match was abandoned and for 3 of the matches, the result is unknown.

In the lead up to this tour, Australia toured Ireland and won all three WODI matches.

== Tour matches ==
=== 55-over match: Middlesex Women vs Australia Women ===
8 July 1987
Scorecard

Australia; 177/4 (49 overs)	v	Middlesex Women; 128 (48.4 overs)
Belinda Haggett 76 (112); Avril Starling 2/31 (10 overs)		Rosalind Heggs 48 (86); Zoe Goss 3/20 (9.4 overs)

Australia Women won by 49 runs
The Paulin Ground, London
Umpires: Esme Irwin (Eng) and K. Merritt (Eng)

- Australia Women won the toss and elected to bat.
- The match was reduced before play started to 49 overs per side.

=== 1-day single innings match: Surrey Women vs Australia Women ===
9 July 1987
Scorecard

Australia; 294/4d (58 overs)	v	Surrey Women; 121/8 (55 overs)
Lindsay Reeler 109 (112); Patsy Lovell 2/55 (16 overs)		Patsy Lovell 53* (109); Jenny Owens 3/20 (11 overs)

Match drawn
Recreation Ground, Banstead
Umpires: Valerie Gibbens (Eng) and Sheila Keen (Eng)

- Surrey Women won the toss and elected to field.

=== 55-over match: South Women vs Australia Women ===
11 July 1987
Scorecard

Australia; 177/6 (52 overs)	v	South Women; 136 (48.2 overs)
Lyn Larsen 71* (86); Patsy Lovell 2/25 (11 overs)		Jan Brittin 42 (81); Lyn Fullston 5/32 (11 overs)

Australia Women won by 41 runs
Milk Marketing Board Ground, Thames Ditton
Umpires: Esme Irwin (Eng) and Judith West (Eng)

- Australia Women won the toss and elected to bat.
- The match was reduced before play started to 52 overs per side.

=== 1-day single innings match: South Women vs Australia Women ===
12 July 1987
Scorecard

South Women; 145/8d (71 overs)	v	Australia; 99/2 (55 overs)
Patsy Lovell 26 (55); Zoe Goss 3/9 (15 overs)		Denise Emerson 40* (98); Catherine Mowat 1/13 (4 overs)

Match drawn
Bank of England Ground, London
Umpires: Valerie Gibbens (Eng) and Esme Irwin (Eng)

- Australia Women won the toss and elected to field.

=== 55-over match: Women's Cricket Association President's XI vs Australia Women ===
14 July 1987
Scorecard

Australia; 175/7 (55 overs)	v	Women's Cricket Association President's XI; 95 (48.2 overs)
Ruth Buckstein 42 (91); Helen Stother 3/36 (9 overs)		Julie May 20 (53); Zoe Goss 3/10 (11 overs)

Australia Women won by 80 runs
Old Actonians Sport Club Ground, London
Umpires: Lorraine Baker (Eng) and Pip Vyvyan (Eng)

- Women's Cricket Association President's XI won the toss and elected to field.

=== 55-over match: South East Women vs Australia Women ===
18 July 1987
Scorecard

South East Women	v	Australia

Match abandoned
Lindfield Cricket Club Ground, Lindfield

=== Kent Women vs Australia Women ===
19 July 1987

Kent Women	v	Australia

Unknown
Crabble Athletic Ground, River

=== 1-day single innings match: East Anglia and Thames Valley Women vs Australia Women ===
27 July 1987
Scorecard

Australia; 202/3d (55 overs)	v	East Anglia and Thames Valley Women; 88/6 (64 overs)
Denise Annetts 96; Gillian McConway 1/32 (15 overs)		Alison Elder 32; Karen Brown 3/14 (13 overs)

Match drawn
Tring Park Cricket Club Ground, Tring
Umpires: Sheila Keen (Eng) and Pip Vyvyan (Eng)

- East Anglia and Thames Valley Women won the toss and elected to field.

=== 55-over match: East Midlands Women vs Australia Women ===
30 July 1987
Scorecard

East Midlands Women; 78 (45.1 overs)	v	Australia; 79/3 (32.1 overs)
Enid Bakewell 25; Jenny Owens 4/24 (11 overs)		Lindsay Reeler 23; Jo Chamberlain 2/25 (11 overs)

Australia Women won by 7 wickets
Leicester Road, Hinckley

- East Midlands Women won the toss and elected to bat.

=== 55-over match: West and West Midlands Women vs Australia Women ===
7 August 1987
Scorecard

Australia; 190/2 (55 overs)	v	West and West Midlands Women; 112 (43.4 overs)
Denise Emerson 81* (147); Judy Wilmot 1/11 (6 overs)		Margaret Frost 32* (87); Jenny Owens 3/31 (10.4 overs)

Australia Women won by 78 runs
Stowe Lane, Colwall
Umpires: Alan Fox (Eng) and H. Whelan (Eng)

- Australia Women won the toss and elected to bat.

=== 55-over match: West and West Midlands Women vs Australia Women ===
8 August 1987
Scorecard

Australia; 207/6 (55 overs)	v	West and West Midlands Women; 127/7 (55 overs)
Ruth Buckstein 85 (144); Sarah Potter 2/32 (6 overs)		Beverley Godley 38 (97); Lyn Fullston 3/18 (11 overs)

Australia Women won by 80 runs
Malvern College Ground, Malvern
Umpires: June Bragger (Eng) and Alan Fox (Eng)

- Australia Women won the toss and elected to bat.

=== 55-over match: North Women vs Australia Women ===
17 August 1987
Scorecard

Australia; 232/5 (55 overs)	v	North Women; 66 (35.1 overs)
Lindsay Reeler 105 (164); Janet Aspinall 3/41 (11 overs)		Mary-Pat Moore 16 (76); Jenny Owens 4/7 (5 overs)

Australia Women won by 166 runs
Trafalgar Road Ground, Southport
Umpires: Alan Heath (Eng) and I. Jackson (Eng)

- North Women won the toss and elected to field.

=== North Women vs Australia Women ===
18 August 1987

North Women	v	Australia

Unknown
Trafalgar Road Ground, Southport

=== 55-over match: Yorkshire Women vs Australia Women ===
19 August 1987
Scorecard

Australia; 211/5 (55 overs)	v	Yorkshire Women; 65 (29.3 overs)
Denise Annetts 68 (86); R. Powell 2/53 (11 overs)		Jane Powell 30 (59); Zoe Goss 4/12 (8 overs)

Australia Women won by 146 runs
Racecourse Ground, Thirsk
Umpires: P. Aspinall (Eng) and Sally Marshall (Eng)

- Yorkshire Women won the toss and elected to field.

=== Young England Women vs Australia Women ===
26 August 1987

Young England	v	Australia

Unknown
Church Lane, Mobberley

== WODI series ==
=== 1st WODI ===
16 July 1987
Scorecard

Australia; 174/3 (31 overs)	v	England; 104/5 (31 overs)
Lindsay Reeler 69 (73); Gillian McConway 1/44 (7 overs)		Jacqueline Court 35 (51); Lyn Fullston 4/12 (6 overs)

Australia Women won by 70 runs
Lord's, London
Umpires: Anne Garton (Eng) and Veronica Reichwald (Eng)

- England Women won the toss and elected to field.
- Jo Chamberlain and Wendy Watson (Eng) both made their WODI debut.
- The match was reduced before play started to 31 overs per side.

=== 2nd WODI ===
22 July 1987
Scorecard

England	v	Australia

Match abandoned
Woodbridge Road, Guildford

=== 3rd WODI ===
25 July 1987
Scorecard

Australia; 177/7 (53 overs)	v	England; 178/4 (49.3 overs)
Lindsay Reeler 60 (124); Sarah Potter 3/41 (10 overs)		Carole Hodges 54 (125); Lyn Larsen 1/23 (11 overs)

England Women won by 6 wickets
St Lawrence Ground, Canterbury
Umpires: Sheila Keen (Eng) and Pip Vyvyan (Eng)

- Australia Women won the toss and elected to bat.
- Patsy Lovell and Elaine Wulcko (Eng) both made their WODI debut.
- The match was reduced before play started to 53 overs per side.

== Test series ==
=== 1st Test ===
1–3 August 1987
Scorecard

England	v	Australia
134 (78.3 overs); Wendy Watson 50 (100); Karen Brown 3/17 (14 overs)		293 (133.2 overs); Belinda Haggett 126 (254); Gillian McConway 6/71 (40 overs)
138 (90.5 overs); Carole Hodges 55 (253); Jenny Owens 4/18 (16.5 overs)

Australia Women won by an innings and 21 runs
New Road, Worcester
Umpires: Janet Burns (Eng) and Anne Garton (Eng)

- England Women won the toss and elected to bat.
- Denise Annetts, Karen Brown, Zoe Goss, Sally Griffiths, Belinda Haggett, Jenny Owens (Aus), Jo Chamberlain, Karen Jobling, Wendy Watson and Elaine Wulcko (Eng) made their women's Test debut.
- Belinda Haggett (Aus) became the sixth batsman to score a century on debut in a women's Test match.

=== 2nd Test ===
21–24 August 1987
Scorecard

England	v	Australia
201 (89.2 overs); Wendy Watson 69* (145); Jenny Owens 5/55 (20.2 overs)		346/3d (139.4 overs); Denise Annetts 193 (?); Jo Chamberlain 2/74 (28 overs)
116/4 (63 overs); Jan Brittin 70* (191); Jenny Owens 2/36 (14 overs)

Match drawn
Collingham and Linton Cricket Club Ground, Collingham
Umpires: Sheila Keen (Eng) and Judith West (Eng)

- England Women won the toss and elected to bat.
- Karen Smithies (Eng) made her women's Test debut.
- Lindsay Reeler (Aus) scored her first and only women's Test century.
- Jenny Owens (Aus) took her first and only five-wicket haul in women's Test cricket.

=== 3rd Test ===
29 August – 1 September 1987
Scorecard

Australia	v	England
366/7d (171 overs); Ruth Buckstein 83* (283); Karen Smithies 3/63 (39 overs)		265/8d (154 overs); Karen Smithies 64 (158); Karen Brown 5/32 (32 overs)
262/8d (114.5 overs); Lindsay Reeler 75 (160); Jacqueline Court 2/31 (11.5 overs)

Match drawn
County Cricket Ground, Hove
Umpires: June Bragger (Eng) and Valerie Gibbens (Eng)

- England Women won the toss and elected to bat.
- Ruth Buckstein (Aus) made her only women's Test appearance.
- Karen Brown (Aus) took her first and only five-wicket haul in women's Test cricket.
