= Raymont =

Raymont may refer to:

== People ==
- Katherine Raymont (born 1959), Australian cricket player
- Peter Raymont (born 1950), Canadian filmmaker and producer
- Raymont Harris (born 1970), former American football running back

== Other uses ==
- Raymont Residential College, a student residential college
