= List of New Zealand women ODI cricketers =

A One Day International (ODI) is an international cricket match between two teams, each having ODI status, as determined by the International Cricket Council. The women's variant of the game is similar to the men's version, with minor modifications to umpiring and pitch requirements. The first women's ODI was played in 1973, between England and Australia. The New Zealand women's national cricket team played their first ODI during the 1973 Women's Cricket World Cup, when they faced Trinidad and Tobago.

== List of ODI cricketers ==
Statistics are correct as of 4 April 2026.

| No | Name | First | Last | Mat | Batting | | | | | Bowling | | | | | Fielding | | Ref |
| No | Name | First | Last | Mat | Runs | HS | Avg | 50 | 100 | Balls | Wkt | BBM | 5WI | Ave | Ca | St | Ref |
|---|---|---|---|---|---|---|---|---|---|---|---|---|---|---|---|---|---|
| 1 | Barbara Bevege | 1973 | 1982 | 16 | 488 | 101 | 32.53 | 3 | 1 | 134 | 3 | 3/17 | 0 | 16.00 | 3 | — | |
| 2 | Bev Brentnall | 1973 | 1973 | 5 | 40 | 18 | 13.33 | 0 | 0 | — | — | — | — | — | 3 | — | |
| 3 | Jos Burley | 1973 | 1973 | 2 | 7 | 7 | 7.00 | 0 | 0 | 78 | 0 | — | — | — | 0 | — | |
| 4 | Shirley Cowles | 1973 | 1973 | 5 | 93 | 46 | 18.60 | 0 | 0 | 30 | 0 | — | — | — | 2 | — | |
| 5 | Judi Doull | 1973 | 1973 | 5 | 64 | 42 | 12.80 | 0 | 0 | — | — | — | — | — | 2 | — | |
| 6 | Carol Marett | 1973 | 1982 | 14 | 149 | 24 | 14.90 | 0 | 0 | 761 | 16 | 3/14 | 0 | 19.37 | 0 | — | |
| 7 | Jenny Olson | 1973 | 1973 | 4 | 17 | 9* | 5.66 | 0 | 0 | 162 | 4 | 3/16 | 0 | 13.00 | 0 | — | |
| 8 | Glenys Page | 1973 | 1973 | 2 | 5 | 5 | 5.00 | 0 | 0 | 104 | 6 | 6/20 | 1 | 7.66 | 0 | — | |
| 9 | Maureen Peters | 1973 | 1982 | 16 | 79 | 24 | 11.28 | 0 | 0 | 935 | 19 | 2/3 | 0 | 15.31 | 3 | — | |
| 10 | Lynda Prichard | 1973 | 1973 | 5 | 73 | 70 | 18.25 | 1 | 0 | — | — | — | — | — | 1 | — | |
| 11 | Jill Saulbrey | 1973 | 1973 | 5 | 75 | 22* | 37.50 | 0 | 0 | 258 | 4 | 2/32 | 0 | 25.00 | 0 | — | |
| 12 | Liz Allan | 1973 | 1978 | 7 | 42 | 17 | 8.40 | 0 | 0 | 354 | 3 | 1/22 | 0 | 54.00 | 2 | — | |
| 13 | Jackie Lord | 1973 | 1982 | 15 | 101 | 25 | 7.76 | 0 | 0 | 795 | 25 | 6/10 | 1 | 12.72 | 2 | — | |
| 14 | Ethna Rouse | 1973 | 1973 | 3 | 90 | 48 | 30.00 | 0 | 0 | — | — | — | — | — | 0 | — | |
| 15 | Eileen Badham | 1973 | 1982 | 19 | 172 | 51* | 14.33 | 1 | 0 | 1164 | 19 | 4/19 | 0 | 22.21 | 10 | — | |
| 16 | Vicki Burtt | 1978 | 1982 | 9 | 168 | 46 | 21.00 | 0 | 0 | 36 | 2 | 2/31 | 0 | 15.50 | 4 | — | |
| 17 | Pat Carrick | 1978 | 1978 | 3 | 7 | 6* | 7.00 | 0 | 0 | 174 | 6 | 3/43 | 0 | 17.66 | 1 | — | |
| 18 | Sheree Harris | 1978 | 1978 | 2 | 1 | 1* | — | — | — | 18 | 0 | — | — | — | 0 | — | |
| 19 | Cheryl Henshilwood | 1978 | 1978 | 2 | 15 | 15* | — | 0 | 0 | — | — | — | — | — | 0 | — | |
| 20 | Trish McKelvey | 1973 | 1982 | 21 | 320 | 54 | 21.33 | 1 | 0 | — | — | — | — | — | 3 | — | |
| 21 | Sue Rattray | 1973 | 1985 | 30 | 576 | 68 | 27.42 | 3 | 0 | 1441 | 26 | 4/33 | 0 | 29.00 | 4 | — | |
| 22 | Edna Ryan † | 1978 | 1982 | 15 | 17 | 6* | 4.25 | 0 | 0 | — | — | — | — | — | 13 | 8 | |
| 23 | Viv Sexton | 1978 | 1978 | 2 | 12 | 9 | 6.00 | 0 | 0 | — | — | — | — | — | 0 | — | |
| 24 | Linda Lindsay | 1978 | 1978 | 2 | 27 | 27 | 0 | 0 | 27.00 | 78 | 2 | 2/26 | 0 | 21.00 | 0 | — | |
| 25 | Karen Marsh | 1978 | 1978 | 1 | 14 | 14 | 14.00 | 0 | 0 | — | — | — | — | — | 0 | — | |
| 26 | Sue Brown | 1982 | 1986 | 18 | 59 | 17* | 11.80 | 0 | 0 | 1020 | 19 | 2/3 | 0 | 16.21 | 5 | — | |
| 27 | Debbie Hockley | 1982 | 2000 | 118 | 4064 | 117 | 41.89 | 34 | 4 | 1522 | 20 | 3/49 | 0 | 42.65 | 41 | — | |
| 28 | Lesley Murdoch | 1982 | 1990 | 25 | 417 | 69 | 21.94 | 1 | 0 | — | — | — | — | — | 4 | — | |
| 29 | Karen Plummer | 1982 | 1992 | 11 | 100 | 32 | 11.11 | 0 | 0 | 60 | 0 | — | — | — | 2 | — | |
| 30 | Nicki Turner | 1982 | 1991 | 28 | 624 | 114 | 26.00 | 2 | 1 | — | — | — | — | — | 4 | — | |
| 31 | Linda Fraser | 1982 | 1987 | 13 | 31 | 8 | 5.16 | 0 | 0 | 702 | 12 | 3/21 | 0 | 24.50 | 2 | — | |
| 32 | Di Caird | 1984 | 1984 | 4 | 72 | 45 | 24.00 | 0 | 0 | — | — | — | — | — | 0 | — | |
| 33 | Jeanette Dunning | 1984 | 1988 | 22 | 346 | 89 | 20.35 | 1 | 0 | 942 | 13 | 3/29 | 0 | 40.53 | 4 | — | |
| 34 | Ingrid Jagersma † | 1984 | 1990 | 34 | 453 | 58* | 19.69 | 2 | 0 | 132 | 4 | 2/14 | 0 | 12.00 | 24 | 9 | |
| 35 | Ann McKenna | 1984 | 1987 | 14 | 214 | 39 | 16.46 | 0 | 0 | — | — | — | — | — | 0 | — | |
| 36 | Rose Signal | 1984 | 1985 | 6 | 12 | 8 | 6.00 | 0 | 0 | 162 | 2 | 1/10 | 0 | 44.50 | 2 | — | |
| 37 | Liz Signal | 1984 | 1988 | 19 | 79 | 28* | 11.28 | 0 | 0 | 783 | 7 | 2/26 | 0 | 70.85 | 5 | — | |
| 38 | Shona Gilchrist | 1984 | 1985 | 8 | 19 | 12 | 4.75 | 0 | 0 | 462 | 7 | 3/20 | 0 | 28.85 | 4 | — | |
| 39 | Jackie Clark | 1985 | 1992 | 31 | 875 | 85 | 29.16 | 7 | 0 | — | — | — | — | — | 5 | — | |
| 40 | Delwyn Costello | 1985 | 1985 | 7 | 1 | 1 | 1.00 | 0 | 0 | 340 | 2 | 2/37 | 0 | 69.50 | 1 | — | |
| 41 | Karen Gunn | 1985 | 1994 | 45 | 461 | 52 | 18.44 | 1 | 0 | 2753 | 53 | 5/22 | 1 | 21.00 | 14 | — | |
| 42 | Lois Simpson | 1985 | 1988 | 12 | 95 | 23* | 9.50 | 0 | 0 | — | — | — | — | — | 1 | — | |
| 43 | Katrina Molloy | 1985 | 1985 | 5 | 0 | 0* | 0.00 | 0 | 0 | 216 | 4 | 2/16 | 0 | 24.75 | 2 | — | |
| 44 | Nancy Williams | 1985 | 1992 | 19 | 80 | 21* | 7.27 | 0 | 0 | 665 | 15 | 3/37 | 0 | 24.93 | 1 | — | |
| 45 | Brigit Legg | 1987 | 1990 | 18 | 79 | 17 | 7.90 | 0 | 0 | 1198 | 20 | 3/4 | 0 | 19.70 | 2 | — | |
| 46 | Julie Harris | 1987 | 1997 | 45 | 99 | 19* | 8.25 | 0 | 0 | 2486 | 61 | 4/8 | 0 | 18.42 | 9 | — | |
| 47 | Penny Kinsella | 1988 | 1995 | 20 | 443 | 57 | 26.05 | 2 | 0 | — | — | — | — | — | 0 | — | |
| 48 | Kirsty Flavell | 1988 | 1996 | 38 | 719 | 54 | 29.95 | 2 | 0 | 420 | 7 | 2/5 | 0 | 22.28 | 5 | — | |
| 49 | Sarah Illingworth † | 1988 | 1996 | 37 | 342 | 51 | 15.54 | 1 | 0 | — | — | — | — | — | 27 | 21 | |
| 50 | Sue Morris | 1988 | 1988 | 8 | 5 | 5 | 5.00 | 0 | 0 | 414 | 7 | 2/13 | 0 | 25.00 | 0 | — | |
| 51 | Jennifer Turner | 1988 | 1994 | 30 | 54 | 15 | 4.50 | 0 | 0 | 1592 | 28 | 5/5 | 1 | 24.82 | 6 | — | |
| 52 | Debbie Ford | 1988 | 1988 | 3 | 46 | 35 | 23.00 | 0 | 0 | 36 | 0 | — | — | — | 1 | — | |
| 53 | Catherine Campbell | 1988 | 2000 | 85 | 69 | 12 | 4.60 | 0 | 0 | 4518 | 78 | 3/15 | 0 | 25.87 | 15 | — | |
| 54 | Kim McDonald | 1991 | 1992 | 6 | 80 | 34 | 13.33 | 0 | 0 | — | — | — | — | — | 1 | — | |
| 55 | Emily Drumm | 1992 | 2006 | 101 | 2844 | 116 | 35.11 | 19 | 2 | 1542 | 37 | 4/31 | 0 | 21.02 | 24 | — | |
| 56 | Shelley Fruin † | 1992 | 1997 | 23 | 385 | 51 | 20.26 | 1 | 0 | — | — | — | — | — | 4 | 1 | |
| 57 | Yvonne Kainuku | 1992 | 1992 | 2 | 4 | 4 | 2.00 | 0 | 0 | 72 | 0 | — | — | — | 0 | — | |
| 58 | Maia Lewis | 1992 | 2005 | 78 | 1372 | 105 | 22.49 | 4 | 1 | 30 | 0 | — | — | — | 30 | — | |
| 59 | Sarah McLauchlan | 1992 | 1997 | 29 | 137 | 34* | 8.56 | 0 | 0 | 1361 | 19 | 2/6 | 0 | 35.00 | 6 | — | |
| 60 | Trudy Anderson | 1993 | 1997 | 26 | 440 | 85 | 17.60 | 2 | 0 | — | — | — | — | — | 9 | — | |
| 61 | Karen Musson | 1993 | 1996 | 13 | 86 | 31 | 10.75 | 0 | 0 | 524 | 10 | 3/22 | 0 | 25.30 | 3 | — | |
| 62 | Lisa Astle | 1993 | 1993 | 1 | — | — | — | — | — | — | — | — | — | — | 0 | — | |
| 63 | Katrina Keenan | 1995 | 2000 | 54 | 348 | 57* | 12.88 | 1 | 0 | 2701 | 70 | 4/5 | 0 | 17.82 | 8 | — | |
| 64 | Clare Nicholson | 1995 | 2000 | 35 | 195 | 73* | 16.25 | 1 | 0 | 1636 | 38 | 4/18 | 0 | 18.60 | 13 | — | |
| 65 | Justine Russell | 1995 | 1996 | 5 | 8 | 8* | 2.66 | 0 | 0 | 156 | 1 | 1/20 | 0 | 84.00 | 0 | — | |
| 66 | Kelly Brown | 1996 | 1997 | 14 | 19 | 9* | 6.33 | 0 | 0 | 520 | 10 | 2/8 | 0 | 25.20 | 4 | — | |
| 67 | Karen Le Comber | 1996 | 1997 | 15 | 442 | 135* | 44.20 | 2 | 1 | — | — | — | — | — | 2 | — | |
| 68 | Helen Daly | 1997 | 1997 | 3 | — | — | — | — | — | 120 | 2 | 1/12 | 0 | 28.50 | 1 | — | |
| 69 | Justine Fryer | 1997 | 1997 | 7 | 1 | 1* | — | 0 | 0 | 198 | 10 | 3/8 | 0 | 11.50 | 0 | — | |
| 70 | Rebecca Rolls † | 1997 | 2007 | 104 | 2201 | 114 | 25.01 | 12 | 2 | — | — | — | — | — | 89 | 44 | |
| 71 | Losi Harford | 1997 | 1997 | 3 | 20 | 9 | 6.66 | 0 | 0 | 42 | 0 | — | — | — | 0 | — | |
| 72 | Rachel Pullar | 1997 | 2005 | 51 | 253 | 27* | 12.04 | 0 | 0 | 2592 | 74 | 5/7 | 2 | 16.48 | 14 | — | |
| 73 | Kathryn Ramel | 1997 | 2002 | 47 | 519 | 41 | 17.30 | 0 | 0 | 1226 | 35 | 3/26 | 0 | 20.82 | 13 | — | |
| 74 | Kate Pulford | 1999 | 2010 | 46 | 743 | 95 | 18.57 | 3 | 0 | 1202 | 30 | 4/5 | 0 | 26.36 | 11 | — | |
| 75 | Anna Smith | 1999 | 2002 | 19 | 497 | 91* | 33.13 | 3 | 0 | — | — | — | — | — | 0 | — | |
| 76 | Donna Trow | 1999 | 1999 | 2 | 1 | 1* | — | 0 | 0 | 72 | 4 | 3/8 | 0 | 4.50 | 1 | — | |
| 77 | Haidee Tiffen | 1999 | 2009 | 117 | 2919 | 100 | 30.72 | 18 | 1 | 1656 | 49 | 4/43 | 0 | 19.48 | 32 | — | |
| 78 | Helen Watson | 1999 | 2008 | 66 | 580 | 115* | 15.26 | 0 | 1 | 2487 | 54 | 3/14 | 0 | 23.87 | 21 | — | |
| 79 | Paula Gruber | 2000 | 2000 | 2 | 0 | 0 | 0.00 | 0 | 0 | 60 | 0 | — | — | — | 0 | — | |
| 80 | Nicola Payne (Note: Nicola Payne has also played 37 One Day Internationals for Netherlands, before playing for New Zealand. Only her record for New Zealand is given above.) | 2000 | 2003 | 28 | 547 | 93 | 24.86 | 2 | 0 | 30 | 1 | 1/22 | 0 | 22.00 | 1 | — | |
| 81 | Munokoa Tunupopo | 2000 | 2000 | 3 | — | — | — | — | — | 108 | 0 | — | — | — | 2 | — | |
| 82 | Paula Flannery | 2000 | 2004 | 17 | 258 | 49* | 17.20 | 0 | 0 | — | — | — | — | — | 3 | — | |
| 83 | Erin McDonald | 2000 | 2000 | 3 | — | — | — | — | — | 144 | 5 | 2/17 | 0 | 10.00 | 1 | — | |
| 84 | Emily Travers | 2000 | 2000 | 3 | — | — | — | — | — | — | — | — | — | — | 0 | — | |
| 85 | Nicola Browne | 2002 | 2014 | 125 | 2002 | 63 | 27.05 | 10 | 0 | 4571 | 88 | 4/20 | 0 | 34.14 | 33 | — | |
| 86 | Anna Dodd | 2002 | 2006 | 31 | 155 | 20* | 17.22 | 0 | 0 | 1243 | 28 | 3/13 | 0 | 26.85 | 10 | — | |
| 87 | Aimee Watkins | 2002 | 2011 | 103 | 1889 | 111 | 21.71 | 6 | 2 | 4392 | 92 | 4/2 | 0 | 31.04 | 37 | — | |
| 88 | Frances King | 2002 | 2003 | 15 | 80 | 31 | 11.57 | 0 | 0 | 649 | 21 | 4/14 | 0 | 19.23 | 2 | — | |
| 89 | Louise Milliken | 2002 | 2007 | 48 | 110 | 21 | 11.00 | 0 | 0 | 2220 | 59 | 5/25 | 1 | 23.88 | 13 | — | |
| 90 | Fiona Fraser | 2002 | 2002 | 5 | 94 | 54* | 94.00 | 1 | 0 | — | — | — | — | — | 1 | — | |
| 91 | Sara McGlashan | 2002 | 2016 | 134 | 2438 | 97* | 22.36 | 11 | 0 | — | — | — | — | — | 36 | — | |
| 92 | Amanda Green | 2003 | 2004 | 14 | 23 | 17* | 7.66 | 0 | 0 | 646 | 12 | 5/15 | 1 | 32.25 | 3 | — | |
| 93 | Michelle Lynch | 2003 | 2003 | 6 | 105 | 29 | 17.50 | 0 | 0 | — | — | — | — | — | 0 | — | |
| 94 | Rebecca Steele | 2003 | 2005 | 32 | 41 | 8* | 6.83 | 0 | 0 | 1758 | 34 | 3/10 | 0 | 24.44 | 6 | — | |
| 95 | Sarah Burke | 2003 | 2008 | 36 | 73 | 10* | 8.11 | 0 | 0 | 1536 | 25 | 3/17 | 0 | 40.76 | 3 | — | |
| 96 | Maria Fahey | 2003 | 2010 | 54 | 1403 | 91 | 27.50 | 2 | 0 | — | — | — | — | — | 15 | — | |
| 97 | Katey Martin † | 2003 | 2022 | 103 | 1793 | 81 | 22.13 | 7 | 0 | — | — | — | — | — | 62 | 19 | |
| 98 | Natalee Scripps | 2003 | 2005 | 7 | 12 | 9* | — | 0 | 0 | 302 | 6 | 2/17 | 0 | 34.33 | 0 | — | |
| 99 | Beth McNeill | 2004 | 2009 | 23 | 193 | 88* | 19.30 | 1 | 0 | 1051 | 23 | 6/32 | 1 | 29.56 | 8 | — | |
| 100 | Suzie Bates | 2006 | 2025 | 181 | 5964 | 168 | 38.23 | 37 | 13 | 3407 | 83 | 4/7 | 0 | 34.13 | 93 | — | |
| 101 | Sarah Tsukigawa | 2006 | 2009 | 42 | 730 | 78* | 22.12 | 2 | 0 | 1535 | 35 | 4/43 | 0 | 32.02 | 9 | — | |
| 102 | Sophie Devine | 2006 | 2025 | 159 | 4279 | 145 | 32.66 | 18 | 9 | 5262 | 111 | 3/24 | 0 | 36.27 | 44 | — | |
| 103 | Ros Kember | 2006 | 2008 | 10 | 155 | 64 | 15.50 | 1 | 0 | — | — | — | — | — | 3 | — | |
| 104 | Selena Charteris | 2007 | 2007 | 5 | 20 | 20* | 10.00 | 0 | 0 | 96 | 1 | 1/32 | 0 | 102.00 | 0 | — | |
| 105 | Rowan Milburn † | 2007 | 2007 | 8 | 89 | 25 | 14.83 | 0 | 0 | — | — | — | — | — | 6 | 0 | |
| 106 | Amy Satterthwaite | 2007 | 2022 | 145 | 4639 | 137* | 38.33 | 27 | 7 | 1930 | 50 | 4/13 | 0 | 29.72 | 57 | — | |
| 107 | Rachel Priest † | 2007 | 2020 | 87 | 1694 | 157 | 28.35 | 9 | 2 | — | — | — | — | — | 72 | 21 | |
| 108 | Rachel Candy | 2007 | 2013 | 18 | 27 | 8 | 6.75 | 0 | 0 | 720 | 18 | 5/19 | 1 | 30.61 | 3 | — | |
| 109 | Ingrid Cronin-Knight | 2008 | 2008 | 3 | 41 | 36 | 13.66 | 0 | 0 | — | — | — | — | — | 0 | — | |
| 110 | Lucy Doolan | 2008 | 2013 | 40 | 674 | 76 | 21.74 | 1 | 0 | 1287 | 32 | 3/7 | 0 | 31.34 | 18 | — | |
| 111 | Abby Burrows | 2009 | 2010 | 9 | 5 | 3* | — | 0 | 0 | 337 | 7 | 3/27 | 0 | 38.14 | 2 | — | |
| 112 | Emma Campbell | 2010 | 2010 | 2 | 14 | 8* | 14.00 | 0 | 0 | 84 | 2 | 1/19 | 0 | 34.50 | 2 | — | |
| 113 | Victoria Lind | 2010 | 2010 | 8 | 178 | 68 | 22.25 | 1 | 0 | — | — | — | — | — | 5 | — | |
| 114 | Sian Ruck | 2010 | 2013 | 27 | 48 | 12* | 12.00 | 0 | 0 | 1279 | 24 | 4/31 | 0 | 32.75 | 3 | — | |
| 115 | Morna Nielsen | 2010 | 2016 | 52 | 121 | 20 | 6.05 | 0 | 0 | 2352 | 53 | 5/21 | 2 | 26.75 | 7 | — | |
| 116 | Natalie Dodd | 2010 | 2021 | 18 | 224 | 52 | 13.17 | 1 | 0 | — | — | — | — | — | 6 | — | |
| 117 | Kate Ebrahim | 2010 | 2018 | 31 | 181 | 24 | 10.64 | 0 | 0 | 1099 | 20 | 3/33 | 0 | 36.75 | 7 | — | |
| 118 | Liz Perry | 2010 | 2017 | 17 | 201 | 70 | 22.33 | 1 | 0 | 48 | 0 | — | — | — | 3 | — | |
| 119 | Erin Bermingham | 2010 | 2017 | 34 | 187 | 35 | 11.68 | 0 | 0 | 1565 | 43 | 4/16 | 0 | 24.24 | 10 | — | |
| 120 | Kelly Anderson | 2011 | 2011 | 6 | 22 | 9* | 7.33 | 0 | 0 | 228 | 5 | 3/45 | 0 | 37.40 | 0 | — | |
| 121 | Frances Mackay | 2011 | 2022 | 30 | 313 | 39* | 16.47 | 0 | 0 | 994 | 26 | 4/34 | 0 | 27.69 | 12 | — | |
| 122 | Lea Tahuhu | 2011 | 2025 | 103 | 442 | 26 | 9.82 | 0 | 0 | 4628 | 125 | 5/37 | 1 | 28.01 | 28 | — | |
| 123 | Janet Brehaut | 2011 | 2011 | 3 | 40 | 23* | 20.00 | 0 | 0 | — | — | — | — | — | 3 | — | |
| 124 | Katie Perkins | 2012 | 2020 | 73 | 1198 | 78 | 27.22 | 4 | 0 | — | — | — | — | — | 35 | — | |
| 125 | Anna Peterson | 2012 | 2019 | 32 | 279 | 46 | 16.41 | 0 | 0 | 826 | 27 | 4/25 | 0 | 17.85 | 9 | — | |
| 126 | Samantha Curtis | 2014 | 2017 | 20 | 346 | 55* | 23.06 | 2 | 0 | 60 | 2 | 1/15 | 0 | 27.00 | 5 | — | |
| 127 | Holly Huddleston | 2014 | 2020 | 36 | 67 | 16* | 6.09 | 0 | 0 | 1527 | 46 | 5/25 | 3 | 24.30 | 2 | — | |
| 128 | Hayley Jensen | 2014 | 2022 | 35 | 296 | 53 | 11.84 | 1 | 0 | 1217 | 28 | 3/32 | 0 | 35.78 | 1 | — | |
| 129 | Maddy Green | 2014 | 2026 | 94 | 2220 | 141* | 31.71 | 10 | 3 | 148 | 2 | 1/5 | 0 | 72.00 | 43 | — | |
| 130 | Felicity Leydon-Davis | 2014 | 2014 | 1 | 10 | 10* | — | 0 | 0 | 50 | 5 | 5/18 | 1 | 3.60 | 0 | — | |
| 131 | Georgia Guy | 2014 | 2015 | 7 | 2 | 2* | 2.00 | 0 | 0 | 289 | 9 | 3/23 | 0 | 19.66 | 1 | — | |
| 132 | Hannah Rowe | 2015 | 2025 | 60 | 352 | 52 | 12.57 | 0 | 0 | 2360 | 65 | 5/55 | 1 | 27.83 | 19 | — | |
| 133 | Leigh Kasperek | 2015 | 2021 | 39 | 299 | 113 | 17.58 | 0 | 1 | 1904 | 65 | 6/46 | 2 | 19.43 | 12 | — | |
| 134 | Thamsyn Newton | 2016 | 2017 | 10 | 57 | 19* | 9.50 | 0 | 0 | 384 | 11 | 5/31 | 1 | 25.00 | 5 | — | |
| 135 | Amelia Kerr | 2016 | 2026 | 90 | 2659 | 232* | 43.59 | 11 | 5 | 4531 | 126 | 7/34 | 3 | 27.54 | 47 | — | |
| 136 | Lauren Down | 2018 | 2024 | 35 | 486 | 90 | 16.75 | 3 | 0 | — | — | — | — | — | 9 | — | |
| 137 | Bernadine Bezuidenhout † (Note: Bernadine Bezuidenhout had played 4 ODI matches for South Africa. Only her records for New Zealand are given above.) | 2014 | 2024 | 16 | 289 | 86 | 24.08 | 1 | 0 | — | — | — | — | — | 9 | 1 | |
| 138 | Jess Watkin | 2018 | 2018 | 6 | 86 | 62 | 17.20 | 1 | 0 | 177 | 6 | 2/30 | 0 | 18.83 | 0 | — | |
| 139 | Rosemary Mair | 2019 | 2026 | 28 | 42 | 7* | 3.81 | 0 | 0 | 1201 | 25 | 5/50 | 1 | 42.12 | 5 | — | |
| 140 | Jess Kerr | 2020 | 2026 | 51 | 365 | 38 | 11.77 | 0 | 0 | 2342 | 68 | 4/23 | 0 | 25.41 | 15 | — | |
| 141 | Brooke Halliday | 2021 | 2026 | 53 | 1414 | 157* | 33.66 | 9 | 1 | 312 | 8 | 1/11 | 0 | 36.12 | 16 | — | |
| 142 | Fran Jonas | 2021 | 2025 | 26 | 14 | 5* | 3.50 | 0 | 0 | 1110 | 20 | 3/40 | 0 | 42.55 | 5 | — | |
| 143 | Molly Penfold | 2021 | 2026 | 16 | 12 | 5 | 2.00 | 0 | 0 | 576 | 14 | 4/42 | 0 | 34.71 | 2 | — | |
| 144 | Isabella Gaze † | 2022 | 2026 | 36 | 557 | 68 | 24.41 | 3 | 0 | — | — | — | — | — | 39 | 6 | |
| 145 | Eden Carson | 2022 | 2025 | 24 | 12 | 4* | 1.71 | 0 | 0 | 992 | 18 | 3/31 | 0 | 45.72 | 8 | 0 | |
| 146 | Georgia Plimmer | 2022 | 2025 | 34 | 556 | 112 | 21.38 | 0 | 1 | — | — | — | — | — | 11 | 0 | |
| 147 | Jess McFadyen † | 2022 | 2022 | 3 | — | — | — | — | — | — | — | — | — | — | 1 | 1 | |
| 148 | Bella James† | 2024 | 2024 | 2 | 51 | 27 | 25.50 | 0 | 0 | — | — | — | — | — | 1 | 0 | |
| 149 | Bree Illing | 2025 | 2026 | 11 | 2 | 1* | 2.00 | 0 | 0 | 534 | 13 | 3/60 | 0 | 35.15 | 3 | 0 | |
| 150 | Polly Inglis† | 2025 | 2026 | 6 | 48 | 34* | 48.00 | 0 | 0 | — | — | — | — | — | 5 | 0 | |
| 151 | Emma McLeod | 2025 | 2026 | 6 | 61 | 35 | 15.25 | 0 | 0 | — | — | — | — | — | 3 | 0 | |
| 152 | Nensi Patel | 2026 | 2026 | 4 | 12 | 12* | — | 0 | 0 | 174 | 3 | 1/16 | 0 | 34.00 | 3 | 0 | |
| 153 | Izzy Sharp | 2026 | 2026 | 6 | 61 | 25 | 15.25 | 0 | 0 | — | — | — | — | — | 1 | 0 | |
| 154 | Flora Devonshire | 2026 | 2026 | 1 | 9 | 9 | 9.00 | 0 | 0 | 12 | 0 | — | — | — | 0 | 0 | |
| 155 | Kayley Knight | 2026 | 2026 | 2 | 1 | 1* | — | 0 | 0 | 102 | 3 | 2/65 | 37.66 | 0 | 0 | 0 | |
