= Isabelle Tsakiris =

Australian cricketer (born 1960)

Personal information
- Full name: Isabelle Tsakiris
- Born: 19 November 1960 (age 65); Adelaide, Australia
- Batting: Right-handed
- Bowling: Right-arm off break
- Role: Bowler

International information
- National side: Australia (1992)
- Only Test (cap 125): 19 February 1992 v England

Domestic team information
- Years: Team
- 1982/83–1992/93: South Australia

Career statistics
Competition	WTest	WFC	WLA
Matches	1	17	25
Runs scored	–	29	29
Batting average	–	7.25	3.22
100s/50s	–	0/0	0/0
Top score	–	7*	5
Balls bowled	300	1,911	1,512
Wickets	7	34	21
Bowling average	6.42	14.61	25.47
5 wickets in innings	0	0	0
10 wickets in match	0	0	0
Best bowling	4/27	4/23	3/1
Catches/stumpings	0/–	4/–	7/–
- Source: CricketArchive, 10 January 2022

Isabelle Tsakiris (born 19 November 1960) is an Australian former cricketer who played as a right-arm off break bowler. She appeared in one Test match for Australia in 1992, against England, taking 7 wickets in the match. She played domestic cricket for South Australia.
