= Katherine Raymont =

Australian cricketer (born 1959)

Personal information
- Full name: Katherine Gayle Raymont
- Born: 31 October 1959 (age 67); Laidley, Queensland, Australia
- Batting: Right-handed
- Role: Wicket-keeper

International information
- National side: Australia (1990)
- Test debut (cap 115): 18 January 1990 v New Zealand
- Last Test: 1 February 1990 v New Zealand
- Only ODI (cap 64): 11 February 1990 v New Zealand

Domestic team information
- Years: Team
- 1980/81-1996/97: Queensland

Career statistics
Competition	WTest	WODI	WFC	WLA
Matches	3	1	33	45
Runs scored	142	2	844	527
Batting average	28.40	2.00	19.62	12.54
100s/50s	0/0	0/0	0/2	0/2
Top score	47	2	85	63
Catches/stumpings	2/–	0/–	37/15	19/6
- Source: CricketArchive, 3 January 2023

Katherine Gayle Raymont (born 31 October 1959) is an Australian former cricketer who played as a wicket-keeper and right-handed batter. She appeared in three Test matches and one One Day Internationals for Australia in 1990, all against New Zealand. She played domestic cricket for Queensland.

Raymont was the first woman from Queensland to play a One Day International for Australia.
