= Gillian Smith =

English cricketer (born 1965)

Personal information
- Full name: Gillian Anne Smith
- Born: 22 November 1965 (age 60); Middlesbrough, Yorkshire, England
- Batting: Right-handed
- Bowling: Left-arm medium
- Role: Bowler

International information
- National side: England (1986–1993)
- Test debut (cap 100): 26 June 1986 v India
- Last Test: 1 August 1987 v Australia
- ODI debut (cap 41): 22 June 1986 v India
- Last ODI: 1 August 1993 v New Zealand

Domestic team information
- Years: Team
- 1985–1986: Yorkshire
- 1988–1993: Middlesex

Career statistics
Competition	WTest	WODI	WFC	WLA
Matches	4	31	5	68
Runs scored	4	13	31	144
Batting average	1.33	6.50	7.75	7.20
100s/50s	0/0	0/0	0/0	0/0
Top score	4	6*	26*	20
Balls bowled	706	1,521	844	3,429
Wickets	6	41	8	110
Bowling average	54.50	12.53	47.37	12.51
5 wickets in innings	0	2	0	4
10 wickets in match	0	0	0	0
Best bowling	2/30	5/15	2/26	5/4
Catches/stumpings	2/–	10/–	3/–	22/–
- Source: CricketArchive, 22 February 2021

Gillian Anne Smith (born 22 November 1965) is an English former cricketer who played as a right-handed batter and left-arm medium bowler. She appeared in 4 Test matches and 31 One Day Internationals for England between 1986 and 1993. She was part of England's winning 1993 World Cup team, taking three wickets in the Final, and, as of 2026, has the lowest bowling average in Women's One Day International cricket history (minimum 1000 balls). Her final WODI appearance was in the final of the 1993 Women's Cricket World Cup. She played domestic cricket for Yorkshire and Middlesex.

On 27 March 2026, Smith and photographer Neil Brinsdon launched the books What Cricket Means To Me and What Yorkshire Cricket Means To Me. The books contain reflections from cricket players, broadcasters, administrators, fans and grassroots volunteers about how cricket has shaped their lives. Proceeds of the books go to the Cricketers' Trust, the charitable arm of the Professional Cricketers' Association, and the Yorkshire County Cricket Club Players' Association.
