= Tania Woodbury =

New Zealand cricketer (born 1964)

Personal information
- Full name: Tania Lorraine Woodbury
- Born: 6 July 1964 (age 62); Lower Hutt, New Zealand
- Batting: Right-handed
- Bowling: Left-arm medium
- Role: Bowler

International information
- National side: New Zealand (1992)
- Test debut (cap 99): 6 February 1992 v England
- Last Test: 12 February 1992 v England

Domestic team information
- Years: Team
- 1989/90–1991/92: Auckland
- 1992/93: Canterbury

Career statistics
Competition	WTest	WFC	WLA
Matches	2	11	1
Runs scored	7	12	–
Batting average	–	4.00	–
100s/50s	0/0	0/0	–
Top score	7*	7*	–
Balls bowled	294	1,308	?
Wickets	4	28	2
Bowling average	25.00	15.25	8.50
5 wickets in innings	0	2	0
10 wickets in match	0	0	0
Best bowling	2/29	6/36	2/17
Catches/stumpings	0/–	1/–	0/–
- Source: CricketArchive, 29 April 2021

Tania Lorraine Woodbury (born 6 July 1964) is a New Zealand former cricketer who played as a left-arm medium bowler. She appeared in two Test matches for New Zealand in 1992. She played domestic cricket for Auckland and Canterbury.
