= Karen Plummer =

New Zealand cricketer (born 1951)

Personal information
- Full name: Karen Vi Plummer
- Born: 14 September 1951 (age 75); Auckland, New Zealand
- Batting: Right-handed
- Bowling: Right-arm medium
- Role: All-rounder

International information
- National side: New Zealand (1982–1992)
- Test debut (cap 78): 6 July 1984 v England
- Last Test: 12 February 1992 v England
- ODI debut (cap 29): 10 January 1982 v England
- Last ODI: 23 January 1992 v Australia

Domestic team information
- Years: Team
- 1967/68–1984/85: North Shore
- 1987/88–1991/92: Auckland

Career statistics
Competition	WTest	WODI	WFC	WLA
Matches	4	11	63	41
Runs scored	28	100	1,470	724
Batting average	4.66	11.11	17.09	19.56
100s/50s	0/0	0/0	1/3	0/2
Top score	13	32	114*	72
Balls bowled	–	60	3,332	696
Wickets	–	0	70	18
Bowling average	–	–	18.52	21.77
5 wickets in innings	–	0	3	0
10 wickets in match	–	0	0	0
Best bowling	–	–	6/16	4/8
Catches/stumpings	2/–	2/–	26/–	13/–
- Source: CricketArchive, 3 August 2021

Karen Vi Plummer (born 14 September 1951) is a New Zealand former cricketer who played as an all-rounder, batting right-handed and bowling right-arm medium. She appeared in 4 Test matches and 11 One Day Internationals for New Zealand between 1982 and 1992. She also captained New Zealand during England's tour of the country in 1991–92. She played domestic cricket for North Shore and Auckland.
