= Ray Hutchison (cricketer) =

New Zealand cricketer

Personal information
- Full name: Raymond William Hutchison
- Born: 21 July 1944 (age 82); Dunedin, Otago, New Zealand
- Batting: Left-handed
- Bowling: Slow left-arm orthodox

Domestic team information
- Years: Team
- 1965/66–1971/72: Otago
- 1973–1975: Buckinghamshire
- 1974–1975: Minor Counties South
- 1975/76: Central Districts

Umpiring information
- WTests umpired: 1 (1992)

Career statistics
Competition	First-class	List A
Matches	37	13
Runs scored	1,234	198
Batting average	20.22	18.00
100s/50s	0/3	0/1
Top score	66	56*
Balls bowled	1,326	282
Wickets	6	7
Bowling average	85.16	40.71
5 wickets in innings	0	0
10 wickets in match	0	0
Best bowling	2/12	4/68
Catches/stumpings	16/–	4/–
- Source: Cricinfo, 22 June 2011

Raymond William Hutchison (born 21 July 1944) is a former New Zealand cricketer and umpire. Hutchison was a left-handed batsman who bowled slow left-arm orthodox. He was born in Dunedin, Otago and worked professionally as a dentist.

== Career ==
Hutchison made his first-class debut for Otago against Northern Districts in 1966. Hutchison played 29 further first-class matches for Otago, the last coming in 1971 against Central Districts. In his 30 first-class matches for Otago, he scored 963 runs and an average of 19.65. He made 3 half centuries, with his highest score of 66 coming against Wellington in 1968. With the ball, he took 3 wickets, which came at an expensive bowling average of 114.33. It was for Otago that he made his debut in List A cricket for, making a single appearance in that format against Canterbury. He scored 36 runs in this match, before being dismissed by David Trist. His playing career with Otago ended at the end of the 1971/72 New Zealand cricket season.

He 1973, he joined English county Buckinghamshire, making his debut for the county in that season Minor Counties Championship against Bedfordshire. Hutchison played Minor counties cricket for Buckinghamshire from 1973 to 1975, making 31 Minor Counties Championship appearances. Playing for Buckinghamshire allowed him to play List A cricket for Minor Counties South, with his first List A appearance for the team coming in the 1974 Benson & Hedges Cup against Glamorgan. He played 7 further List A matches for the team which were spread over the 1974 Benson & Hedges Cup and the 1975 Benson & Hedges Cup. In total, he made 8 appearances for the team, scoring 73 runs at an average of 9.12, while with the ball he took 6 wickets at an average of 28.16, with best figures of 4/68. During his time in England, he also played limited-overs cricket for Buckinghamshire on 2 occasions: against Kent in the 1974 Gillette Cup and Middlesex in the 1975 Gillette Cup.

Returning to New Zealand, Hutchison joined Central Districts for the 1975/76 season, making 7 first-class appearances in that season, the last of which came against Auckland. In his 7 first-class appearances for the team, he scored 271 runs at an average of 22.58, with a high score of 45. He also took 3 first-class wickets for Central Districts, which came at an average of 56.00. He also made 2 List A appearances in that season against Northern Districts and Wellington, with the match against Wellington being the one in which he recorded his only List A half century, making an unbeaten 56. He did not feature for the team in any form of cricket after that season.

Following his retirement, Hutchison umpired in first-class and List A cricket from 1990 to 1992, during which he also umpired in a Women's Test match between New Zealand women and England women.
