= Gary Beer =

New Zealand cricketer (born 1941)

Personal information
- Full name: Gary Douglas Beer
- Born: 10 October 1941 (age 85); Christchurch, New Zealand
- Batting: Right-handed
- Bowling: Right-arm medium
- Role: Batsman

Domestic team information
- Years: Team
- 1963/64–1964/65: Central Districts
- 1965/66–1967/68: Otago
- FC debut: 22 March 1963 New Zealand under-23 v Northern Districts
- Last FC: 5 January 1968 Otago v Central Districts

Career statistics
Competition	First-class
Matches	19
Runs scored	572
Batting average	16.82
100s/50s	0/1
Top score	57
Balls bowled	6
Wickets	1
Bowling average	7.00
5 wickets in innings	0
10 wickets in match	0
Best bowling	1/7
Catches/stumpings	10/–
- Source: CricInfo, 8 January 2022

Gary Douglas Beer (born 10 October 1941), was a New Zealand cricketer who played 19 first-class matches for the Central Districts and Otago in the 1960s.

Beer was born at Christchurch in New Zealand, educated at Christchurch West High School and played club cricket for Sydenham Cricket Club in the city. He was described in 1961, before his first-class debut, as "one of the most promising cricketers in Canterbury" and as an "aggressive opening bat, a fine fielder with a good arm, and a useful, medium-pace bowler". He played under-20 and under-23 cricket for Canterbury in 1961/62 and under-23 cricket for Central Districts the following season, during which he made his first-class debut in March 1963, playing for a New Zealand under-23 team against Northern Districts. He went on to make his Plunket Shield debut for Central Districts in December of the same year. He played six matches for Central Districts over the following two seasons, his final first-class appearance for the team coming against the touring Pakistanis in February 1965.

The following season, Beer moved to play for Otago. He played in 12 senior matches for the team, his final first-class appearance coming in January 1968 in a Plunket Shield match against Central Districts. He played in a non-first-class match for the team against the touring Australians in February 1967. In his 19 first-class matches he scored a total of 572 runs with a highest score of 57―his only half-century in first-class cricket. Beer played Hawke Cup cricket for Hawke's Bay in 1963/64 and 1964/65 and for Wairarapa in 1970/71 and 1971/72.
