= Melissa Papworth =

Australian cricketer (born 1966)

Personal information
- Full name: Melissa Mary Papworth
- Batting: Right-handed
- Bowling: Right-arm off-break

International information
- National side: Australia
- ODI debut (cap 63): 6 February 1990 v New Zealand
- Last ODI: 11 February 1990 v New Zealand

Domestic team information
- Years: Team
- 1987/88–1993/94: Victoria

Career statistics
Competition	ODI
Matches	3
Runs scored	39
Batting average	13.00
100s/50s	0/0
Top score	19
Catches/stumpings	0/–
- Source: CricInfo, 19 May 2014

Melissa Mary Papworth (born 18 June 1966) is an Australian former cricket player. Papworth played domestic cricket for the Victorian women's state cricket team between 1987 and 1994. She played three One Day Internationals for the Australia women's national cricket team. She was born at Melbourne.
