= Dudley Park, Rangiora =

Cricket ground in Rangiora, New Zealand

Coordinates: 43°18′24.73″S 172°35′17.61″E

Dudley Park
- Interactive map of Dudley Park

Ground information
- Location: Rangiora, New Zealand
- Country: New Zealand
- Establishment: 1929

International information
- First women's ODI: 6 February 1982: New Zealand v Australia
- Last women's ODI: 22 February 1982: Australia v England

Team information
Canterbury Women	(1998–2003)
Canterbury	(1981–2002)
- As of 1 September 2020; Source: Ground profile

Dudley Park is a cricket ground in Rangiora, Canterbury, New Zealand. The park precincts, situated between Church and White Streets, also include an aquatic centre, netball courts and hockey ground. It was the main cricket ground in Rangiora between 1929 and 2004.

== History ==
Dudley Park was developed by the Rangiora Borough Council as a public sports ground in the 1920s, and named after a former owner of the land, Archdeacon Dudley. It was officially opened in May 1928 when two football games and two hockey games were played simultaneously. An artificial cricket pitch was laid down at the ground and the first match was played there in February 1929.

The first major match on the ground was between North Canterbury and Central Otago in the 1963/64 Hawke Cup. A single Youth One Day International was played there in 1987 when New Zealand Young Cricketers played Australia Young Cricketers. The ground first held a List A match in the 1980/81 Shell Cup when Canterbury played Central Districts. Canterbury played six further List A matches there, the last of which came in the 1996/97 Shell Cup. Dudley Park has also hosted first-class matches, the first of which saw Canterbury play Wellington in the 1984/85 Shell Trophy. Fourteen further first-class matches have been held there, the last of which saw Canterbury play Wellington in the 2002/03 State Championship. The ground has twice held the final of the Shell Trophy, with Canterbury winning on both occasions.

Two Women's One Day Internationals have been played at Dudley Park, the first came in the 1982 Women's World Cup when New Zealand Women played Australia Women, while the second saw Australia Women play England Women in the 1991/92 Shell Tri-Series. The ground was also used a home venue for Canterbury Women in the State League between the 1998/99 and 2002/03 seasons.

Dudley Park was the main cricket ground in Rangiora between 1929 and 2004, when cricket's local base moved to Rangiora Recreation Ground.
