= Yvonne Kainuku =

New Zealand cricketer (born 1968)

Personal information
- Full name: Yvonne Joan Kainuku
- Born: 1968 (age 57–58); Auckland, New Zealand
- Batting: Right-handed
- Bowling: Right-hand fast-medium
- Role: Bowler

International information
- National side: New Zealand (1992)
- Only Test (cap 95): 11 January 1992 v England
- ODI debut (cap 57): 19 January 1992 v Australia
- Last ODI: 20 January 1992 v England

Domestic team information
- Years: Team
- 1984/85–1991/92: Auckland

Career statistics
Competition	WTest	WODI	WFC	WLA
Matches	1	2	22	19
Runs scored	23	4	278	143
Batting average	–	2.00	18.53	11.00
100s/50s	0/0	0/0	0/0	0/0
Top score	23*	4	44	25
Balls bowled	90	72	2,069	911
Wickets	1	0	55	21
Bowling average	50.00	–	20.38	21.23
5 wickets in innings	0	0	1	1
10 wickets in match	0	0	0	0
Best bowling	1/50	–	5/45	6/30
Catches/stumpings	0/–	0/–	9/–	1/–
- Source: CricketArchive, 29 April 2021

Yvonne Joan Kainuku (born 1968) is a New Zealand former cricketer who played as a right-arm fast-medium bowler. She appeared in 1 Test match and 2 One Day Internationals for New Zealand in 1992. She played domestic cricket for Auckland.
