= Susan Metcalfe =

English cricketer (born 1965)

Personal information
- Full name: Susan Jacqueline Metcalfe
- Born: 25 May 1965 (age 61); Kilnsey, Yorkshire, England
- Batting: Right-handed
- Bowling: Right-arm medium
- Role: Batter

International information
- National side: England (1984–1998)
- Test debut (cap 92): 6 July 1984 v New Zealand
- Last Test: 12 July 1996 v New Zealand
- ODI debut (cap 39): 3 February 1985 v Australia
- Last ODI: 21 July 1998 v Australia

Domestic team information
- Years: Team
- 1984–2004: Yorkshire

Career statistics
Competition	WTest	WODI	WFC	WLA
Matches	13	36	19	156
Runs scored	365	534	555	2,898
Batting average	24.33	24.27	27.75	29.57
100s/50s	0/2	0/1	0/4	1/8
Top score	66	51*	71*	109*
Balls bowled	450	36	776	712
Wickets	3	0	8	11
Bowling average	71.00	–	45.12	38.54
5 wickets in innings	0	–	0	0
10 wickets in match	0	–	0	0
Best bowling	1/20	–	2/38	3/48
Catches/stumpings	2/–	8/–	4/–	48/19
- Source: CricketArchive, 26 February 2021

Susan Jacqueline Metcalfe (born 25 May 1965) is an English former cricketer who played as a right-handed batter and right-arm medium bowler. She appeared in 13 Test matches and 36 One Day Internationals for England between 1984 and 1998. She played domestic cricket for Yorkshire.
