= Shelley Fruin =

New Zealand cricketer (born 1961)

Personal information
- Full name: Michelle Kay Fruin
- Born: 31 December 1961 (age 64); Pukekohe, New Zealand
- Batting: Right-handed
- Role: Wicket-keeper

International information
- National side: New Zealand (1992–1997)
- Test debut (cap 94): 11 January 1992 v England
- Last Test: 12 July 1996 v England
- ODI debut (cap 56): 19 January 1992 v Australia
- Last ODI: 29 December 1997 v Australia

Domestic team information
- Years: Team
- 1984/85–2001/02: Auckland

Career statistics
Competition	WTest	WODI	WFC	WLA
Matches	6	23	29	109
Runs scored	188	385	851	2,310
Batting average	23.50	20.26	20.75	23.81
100s/50s	0/2	0/1	1/3	0/10
Top score	80	51	106	97
Balls bowled	–	–	48	–
Wickets	–	–	0	–
Bowling average	–	–	–	–
5 wickets in innings	–	–	0	–
10 wickets in match	–	–	0	–
Best bowling	–	–	–	–
Catches/stumpings	3/1	4/1	27/3	29/6
- Source: CricketArchive, 26 April 2021

Michelle Kay "Shelley" Fruin (born 31 December 1961) is a New Zealand former cricketer who played as a wicket-keeper and right-handed batter. She appeared in 6 Test matches and 23 One Day Internationals for New Zealand between 1992 and 1997. Her final WODI appearance was in the final of the 1997 Women's Cricket World Cup. She played domestic cricket for Auckland.
