= Janet Godman =

English cricketer (born 1966)

Personal information
- Full name: Janet Louise Godman
- Born: 16 March 1966 (age 60); Wycombe, Buckinghamshire, England
- Batting: Right-handed
- Bowling: Right-arm medium
- Role: Batter

International information
- National side: England (1991–1996)
- Test debut (cap 113): 19 February 1992 v Australia
- Last Test: 4 July 1996 v New Zealand
- ODI debut (cap 60): 17 July 1991 v Netherlands
- Last ODI: July 26 1993 v Australia

Domestic team information
- Years: Team
- 1981–1993: Thames Valley
- 1995–1998: West
- 2000–2011: Somerset
- 2013–2014: Wiltshire
- 2016–2019: Buckinghamshire

Career statistics
Competition	WTest	WODI	WLA	WT20
Matches	2	7	109	19
Runs scored	14	58	2,795	414
Batting average	4.66	9.66	34.08	37.63
100s/50s	0/0	0/0	2/21	0/3
Top score	12	17	117*	89
Balls bowled	–	–	1,337	153
Wickets	–	–	37	8
Bowling average	–	–	19.75	15.37
5 wickets in innings	–	–	1	0
10 wickets in match	–	–	0	0
Best bowling	–	–	5/13	2/4
Catches/stumpings	0/–	4/–	32/–	2/–
- Source: CricketArchive, 14 February 2021

Janet Louise Godman (née Siderfin; born 16 March 1966) is an English former cricketer who played as a right-handed batter. She played two Test matches and seven One Day Internationals for England between 1991 and 1996. She played domestic cricket for Thames Valley, West of England, Somerset, Wiltshire, and Buckinghamshire.
