= Kim Fazackerley =

Australian cricketer (born 1967)

Personal information
- Born: 16 February 1967 (age 59); Hobart, Tasmania, Australia
- Batting: Right-handed
- Bowling: Right-arm medium-fast
- Role: Bowler
- Relatives: Erin Fazackerley (niece)

International information
- National side: Australia (1992–1996)
- Test debut (cap 123): 19 February 1992 v England
- Last Test: 8 February 1996 v New Zealand
- ODI debut (cap 68): 19 January 1992 v New Zealand
- Last ODI: 4 February 1996 v New Zealand

Domestic team information
- Years: Team
- 1985/86–1990/91: Tasmania
- 1991/92–1993/94: Australian Capital Territory
- 1994/95–1996/97: Queensland

Career statistics
Competition	WTest	WODI	WFC	WLA
Matches	3	9	16	54
Runs scored	14	14	342	727
Batting average	–	7.00	22.80	21.38
100s/50s	0/0	0/0	0/1	0/2
Top score	14*	8*	56*	52
Balls bowled	438	436	2,035	1,828
Wickets	3	9	28	60
Bowling average	30.66	19.33	22.07	22.21
5 wickets in innings	0	0	1	0
10 wickets in match	0	0	0	0
Best bowling	2/58	3/18	5/42	4/36
Catches/stumpings	0/–	1/–	6/–	14/–
- Source: CricketArchive, 2 February 2021

Kim M Fazackerley (born 16 February 1967) is an Australian former cricketer who played primarily as a right-arm medium fast bowler. She appeared in three Test matches and nine One Day Internationals for Australia between 1992 and 1996. She played domestic cricket for Tasmania, Australian Capital Territory and Queensland.

Fazackerley was the first Tasmanian woman to play for Australia. Her niece, Erin Fazackerley, is also a cricketer, having played in the Women's Big Bash League and the Women's National Cricket League.
