= Debra Stock =

English cricketer (born 1962)

Personal information
- Full name: Debra Ann Stock
- Born: 17 July 1962 (age 64); Oxford, Oxfordshire, England
- Batting: Right-handed
- Bowling: Right-arm off break
- Role: All-rounder

International information
- National side: England (1992–1996)
- Test debut (cap 112): 6 February 1992 v New Zealand
- Last Test: 12 July 1996 v New Zealand
- ODI debut (cap 62): 18 January 1992 v Australia
- Last ODI: 18 June 1996 v New Zealand

Domestic team information
- Years: Team
- 1989–1999: Thames Valley
- 2000–2004: Berkshire

Career statistics
Competition	WTest	WODI	WFC	WLA
Matches	7	15	12	115
Runs scored	91	153	235	2,408
Batting average	10.11	19.12	15.66	28.00
100s/50s	0/0	0/0	0/0	2/13
Top score	22	46	42	119*
Balls bowled	1,150	724	1,648	5,556
Wickets	15	13	18	114
Bowling average	28.66	27.46	35.27	21.85
5 wickets in innings	0	0	0	0
10 wickets in match	0	0	0	0
Best bowling	4/32	2/2	4/32	4/14
Catches/stumpings	1/–	2/–	2/–	30/–
- Source: CricketArchive, 14 February 2021

Debra Ann Stock (born 17 July 1962) is a former English international cricketer. A right-handed batter and right-arm off break bowler, she played in seven Test matches and fifteen One Day Internationals for England between 1992 and 1996, and was part of the squad that won the World Cup in 1993. She played domestic cricket for Thames Valley and Berkshire.
