= Kim McDonald =

New Zealand cricketer (born 1964)

Personal information
- Full name: Kim Lorraine McDonald
- Born: 9 May 1967 (age 59); Morrinsville, New Zealand
- Batting: Right-handed
- Role: Batter

International information
- National side: New Zealand (1991–1992)
- Only Test (cap 97): 11 January 1992 v England
- ODI debut (cap 54): 17 January 1991 v Australia
- Last ODI: 23 January 1992 v Australia

Domestic team information
- Years: Team
- 1983/84–1991/92: Auckland

Career statistics
Competition	WTest	WODI	WFC	WLA
Matches	1	6	25	24
Runs scored	1	80	1,204	341
Batting average	1.00	13.33	34.40	14.82
100s/50s	0/0	0/0	1/8	0/0
Top score	1	34	143*	46
Balls bowled	–	–	347	–
Wickets	–	–	7	–
Bowling average	–	–	30.28	–
5 wickets in innings	–	–	0	–
10 wickets in match	–	–	0	–
Best bowling	–	–	2/9	–
Catches/stumpings	0/–	1/–	5/–	3/–
- Source: CricketArchive, 29 April 2021

Kim Lorraine McDonald (born 9 May 1967) is a New Zealand former cricketer who played as a right-handed batter. She appeared in 1 Test match and 6 One Day Internationals for New Zealand between 1991 and 1992. She played domestic cricket for Auckland.
