= Suzie Kitson =

English cricketer (born 1969)

Suzie Clarke
Personal information
- Full name: Suzanne Jane Clarke
- Born: 1 May 1969 (age 57); Cambridge, Cambridgeshire, England
- Bowling: Left-arm medium
- Role: All-rounder

International information
- National side: England (1988–1993)
- Test debut (cap 108): 11 January 1992 v New Zealand
- Last Test: 19 February 1992 v Australia
- ODI debut (cap 49): 30 November 1988 v New Zealand
- Last ODI: 1 August 1993 v New Zealand

Domestic team information
- Years: Team
- 1988–1993: East Anglia

Career statistics
Competition	WTest	WODI	WFC	WLA
Matches	4	23	6	57
Runs scored	43	105	154	1,062
Batting average	14.33	9.54	30.80	31.23
100s/50s	0/0	0/0	0/1	0/5
Top score	35	29	76	79*
Balls bowled	546	807	911	2,625
Wickets	6	19	13	57
Bowling average	26.66	17.68	19.53	19.33
5 wickets in innings	0	0	0	0
10 wickets in match	0	0	0	0
Best bowling	2/16	3/13	4/54	4/8
Catches/stumpings	2/–	11/–	3/–	24/–
- Source: CricketArchive, 20 February 2021

Suzie Jane Clarke (née Kitson; born 1 May 1969), is an English former cricketer who played for England between 1988 and 1993. She appeared in 4 Test matches and 23 One Day Internationals. In 1993, Clarke took the winning wicket in the World Cup final as England won their second title. Her final WODI appearance was in the final of the 1993 Women's Cricket World Cup. She played domestic cricket for East Anglia.
