= Helen Plimmer =

English cricketer (born 1965)

Personal information
- Full name: Helen Clare Plimmer
- Born: 3 June 1965 (age 61); Solomon Islands
- Batting: Right-handed
- Role: Batter

International information
- National side: England (1989–1997)
- Test debut (cap 111): 11 January 1992 v New Zealand
- Last Test: 4 July 1996 v New Zealand
- ODI debut (cap 55): 19 July 1989 v Netherlands
- Last ODI: 26 December 1997 v New Zealand

Domestic team information
- Years: Team
- 1985–1997: Yorkshire

Career statistics
Competition	WTest	WODI	WFC	WLA
Matches	9	37	12	88
Runs scored	243	886	373	2,536
Batting average	18.69	25.31	20.72	32.93
100s/50s	0/0	1/5	0/1	3/15
Top score	46	118	65	148
Catches/stumpings	9/–	11/–	12/–	29/–
- Source: CricketArchive, 15 February 2021

Helen Clare Plimmer (born 3 June 1965) is an English former cricketer who played as a right-handed batter. She appeared in 9 Test matches and 37 One Day Internationals for England between 1989 and 1997, including being part of England's 1993 World Cup winning squad. She played domestic cricket for Yorkshire.
