= Lee-Anne Hunter =

Australian cricketer (born 1964)

Personal information
- Full name: Lee-Anne Hunter
- Born: 14 July 1964 (age 62); Adelaide, South Australia
- Batting: Right-handed
- Bowling: Right-arm medium
- Role: All-rounder

International information
- National side: Australia (1985–1996)
- Test debut (cap 122): 19 February 1992 v England
- Last Test: 8 February 1996 v New Zealand
- ODI debut (cap 47): 7 February 1985 v New Zealand
- Last ODI: 4 February 1996 v New Zealand

Domestic team information
- Years: Team
- 1981/82–1997/98: South Australia

Career statistics
Competition	WTest	WODI	WFC	WLA
Matches	2	24	28	88
Runs scored	40	267	625	2,064
Batting average	40.00	16.68	20.83	29.07
100s/50s	0/0	0/0	0/2	3/9
Top score	31	47	83	115*
Balls bowled	72	778	3,280	3,755
Wickets	2	15	39	79
Bowling average	3.50	15.40	23.25	18.60
5 wickets in innings	0	0	1	1
10 wickets in match	0	0	0	0
Best bowling	2/7	3/19	5/52	5/18
Catches/stumpings	0/–	3/–	10/–	15/–
- Source: CricketArchive, 31 December 2022

Lee-Anne Hunter (born 14 July 1964) is an Australian former cricketer who played as a right-handed batter and right-arm medium bowler. She appeared in two Test matches and 24 One Day Internationals for Australia between 1985 and 1996. She played domestic cricket for South Australia.
