= Denise Annetts =

Australian cricketer

Personal information
- Full name: Denise Audrey Annetts
- Born: 30 January 1964 (age 62); Sydney, Australia
- Batting: Right-handed
- Bowling: Right-arm leg break
- Role: Batter

International information
- National side: Australia (1985–1993)
- Test debut (cap 109): 1 August 1987 v England
- Last Test: 19 February 1992 v England
- ODI debut (cap 43): 7 February 1985 v New Zealand
- Last ODI: 29 July 1993 v New Zealand

Domestic team information
- Years: Team
- 1983/84–1993/94: New South Wales

Career statistics
Competition	Test	ODI	FC	LA
Matches	10	43	36	79
Runs scored	819	1,126	1,947	2,015
Batting average	81.90	41.70	62.80	39.50
100s/50s	2/6	1/8	4/14	1/14
Top score	193	100*	193	100*
Balls bowled	42	–	398	6
Wickets	0	–	8	0
Bowling average	–	–	19.62	–
5 wickets in innings	–	–	0	–
10 wickets in match	–	–	0	–
Best bowling	–	–	2/6	–
Catches/stumpings	12/–	23/–	29/–	36/–
- Source: CricketArchive, 9 January 2023

Denise Audrey Annetts (married name Denise Anderson; born 30 January 1964) is an Australian former cricketer who played as a right-handed batter. She appeared in 10 Test matches and 43 One Day Internationals for Australia between 1985 and 1993. She played domestic cricket for New South Wales.

== Career ==
Annetts first appeared for New South Wales in the 1983/84 season, and after a couple of low scores, she made her first half-century against Australian Capital Territory in her third match before being run out on 51. Her following match brought another half century, improving slightly to 56 before being caught. In January 1985 she was selected for the Women's Cricket Association of Australia President's XI to play the touring England side, and was subsequently named in the Australia team to face New Zealand the following month. She scored 26* on her One Day International debut as Australia chased down a low New Zealand total to win by nine wickets.

Her maiden ODI half-century came the following season when she made 57 runs opening the batting with Belinda Haggett against New Zealand in Wellington. In 1987, during Australia's tours of Ireland and England, Annetts scored her second half-century during the Third ODI against Ireland, before making a century against Surrey, including a 184-second-wicket partnership with Lindsay Reeler, a portent of things to come. She scored 36* and 50 in the two ODIs followed by 34 on her Test debut, a match dominated by Haggett's 126.

On her second Test appearance, Annetts came in to partner Lindsay Reeler with the score on 2/37 after Denise Emerson and Belinda Haggett had fallen early. The pair put on a record wicket partnership for any wicket in Women's Test cricket history of 309 runs, with Annetts making her top score of 193, while Reeler finished on 110*. She also holds the record of highest average in Women's Test Cricket.

In January 1994, she claimed her omission from the Australian team was because she was not a lesbian. The Australian Anti-Discrimination Board could not investigate the complaint as the discrimination law only protected homosexuals.

== International centuries ==
Test centuries
Runs	Match	Opponents	City	Venue	Year
193	2	England	Wetherby, England	Collingham and Linton Cricket Club Ground	1987
148*	10	England	Sydney, Australia	North Sydney Oval	1992

- Source: CricInfo

One-Day International centuries
Runs	Match	Opponents	City	Venue	Year
100*	34	England	Christchurch, New Zealand	AMI Stadium	1992

- Source: CricInfo
