= Penny Kinsella =

New Zealand cricketer

Personal information
- Full name: Penelope Dale Kinsella
- Born: 14 August 1963 (age 63); Palmerston North, New Zealand
- Batting: Right-handed
- Bowling: Right-arm leg break
- Role: Batter
- Relatives: David Kinsella (father)

International information
- National side: New Zealand (1988–1995)
- Test debut (cap 91): 18 January 1990 v Australia
- Last Test: 7 February 1995 v India
- ODI debut (cap 47): 20 January 1988 v Australia
- Last ODI: 20 February 1995 v Australia

Domestic team information
- Years: Team
- 1981/82–1987/88: Central Districts
- 1988/89–1996/97: Wellington

Career statistics
| Competition | WTest | WODI | WFC | WLA |
|---|---|---|---|---|
| Matches | 6 | 20 | 46 | 76 |
| Runs scored | 131 | 443 | 1,927 | 1,637 |
| Batting average | 16.37 | 26.05 | 29.19 | 23.05 |
| 100s/50s | 0/1 | 0/2 | 0/15 | 0/8 |
| Top score | 53 | 57 | 90 | 93 |
| Balls bowled | – | – | 170 | 12 |
| Wickets | – | – | 11 | 1 |
| Bowling average | – | – | 11.45 | 9.00 |
| 5 wickets in innings | – | – | 0 | 0 |
| 10 wickets in match | – | – | 0 | 0 |
| Best bowling | – | – | 4/35 | 1/9 |
| Catches/stumpings | 3/– | 0/– | 33/– | 18/– |
- Source: CricketArchive, 29 April 2021

Penelope Dale Kinsella (born 14 August 1963) is a New Zealand former cricketer who played as a right-handed batter. She appeared in 6 Test matches and 20 One Day Internationals for New Zealand between 1988 and 1995. She played domestic cricket for Central Districts and Wellington.

In 1992–93 she scored the highest aggregate ever made by a Wellington club cricketer in one season, 1259 runs. The Penny Kinsella Trophy is awarded to the Wellington U19 Women's Most Valuable Player.

She is a teacher at Onslow College in Wellington. Her father was cricketer and cricket umpire David Kinsella.
