= Carole Hodges =

English cricketer (born 1959)

Personal information
- Full name: Carole Ann Hodges
- Born: 1 September 1959 (age 67); Blackpool, Lancashire, England
- Batting: Right-handed
- Bowling: Right-arm off break
- Role: All-rounder

International information
- National side: England (1982–1993)
- Test debut (cap 90): 6 July 1984 v New Zealand
- Last Test: 19 February 1992 v Australia
- ODI debut (cap 32): 14 January 1982 v International XI
- Last ODI: 1 August 1993 v New Zealand

Domestic team information
- Years: Team
- 1976–1993: Lancashire and Cheshire

Career statistics
Competition	WTest	WODI	WFC	WLA
Matches	18	47	36	101
Runs scored	1,164	1,073	2,051	3,403
Batting average	40.13	32.51	37.29	48.61
100s/50s	2/6	2/3	3/11	8/14
Top score	158*	113	158*	182*
Balls bowled	2,556	2,207	5,242	4,966
Wickets	23	58	68	118
Bowling average	29.47	15.06	23.94	17.10
5 wickets in innings	0	0	1	2
10 wickets in match	0	0	0	0
Best bowling	4/21	4/3	7/35	5/18
Catches/stumpings	25/–	22/–	44/–	38/–
- Source: CricketArchive, 27 February 2021

Carole Ann Hodges (married name Carole Cornthwaite; born 1 September 1959) is an English former cricketer who played as a right-handed batter and right-arm off break bowler. She appeared in 18 Test matches and 47 One Day Internationals for England between 1982 and 1993. She was part of the England team that won the 1993 World Cup, and took the first ever WODI hattrick in England's first game of the tournament, against Denmark. Her final WODI appearance was in the final of the 1993 Women's Cricket World Cup. She played domestic cricket for Lancashire and Cheshire.
