= Sarah McLauchlan =

New Zealand cricketer (born 1973)

Personal information
- Full name: Sarah McLauchlan
- Born: 6 April 1973 (age 53); Christchurch, New Zealand
- Batting: Right-handed
- Bowling: Right-arm medium
- Role: Bowler

International information
- National side: New Zealand (1992–1997)
- Test debut (cap 98): 6 February 1992 v England
- Last Test: 8 February 1996 v Australia
- ODI debut (cap 59): 19 January 1992 v Australia
- Last ODI: 29 December 1997 v Australia

Domestic team information
- Years: Team
- 1990/91–1994/95: Canterbury
- 1995/96–1998/99: Auckland

Career statistics
Competition	WTest	WODI	WFC	WLA
Matches	4	29	21	80
Runs scored	4	137	181	629
Batting average	1.00	8.56	10.64	13.38
100s/50s	0/0	0/0	0/0	0/1
Top score	4	34*	33	56
Balls bowled	232	11,361	2,261	3,355
Wickets	2	19	48	80
Bowling average	41.50	35.00	15.66	23.21
5 wickets in innings	0	0	1	1
10 wickets in match	0	0	1	0
Best bowling	1/7	2/6	6/49	5/12
Catches/stumpings	1/–	6/–	9/–	19/–
- Source: CricketArchive, 27 April 2021

Sarah McLauchlan (born 6 April 1973) is a New Zealand former cricketer who played as a right-arm medium bowler. She appeared in 4 Test matches and 29 One Day Internationals for New Zealand between 1992 and 1997. Her final WODI appearance was in the final of the 1997 Women's Cricket World Cup. She played domestic cricket for Canterbury and Auckland.
