= Nancy Williams =

New Zealand cricketer (born 1959)

Personal information
- Full name: Nancy May Williams
- Born: 4 March 1959 (age 67); Christchurch, New Zealand
- Batting: Right-handed
- Bowling: Right-arm off break; Right-arm medium
- Role: All-rounder

International information
- National side: New Zealand (1985–1992)
- Test debut (cap 88): 7 March 1985 v India
- Last Test: 6 February 1992 v England
- ODI debut (cap 44): 10 February 1985 v Australia
- Last ODI: 20 January 1992 v England

Domestic team information
- Years: Team
- 1981/82–1984/85: Canterbury
- 1985/86–1993/94: Wellington

Career statistics
Competition	WTest	WODI	WFC	WLA
Matches	4	19	42	57
Runs scored	70	80	1,348	614
Batting average	17.50	7.27	38.51	16.59
100s/50s	0/0	0/0	0/8	0/1
Top score	35*	21*	85*	51
Balls bowled	596	665	3,248	2,274
Wickets	3	15	70	53
Bowling average	52.66	24.93	14.67	19.58
5 wickets in innings	0	0	2	0
10 wickets in match	0	0	0	0
Best bowling	2/19	3/37	5/20	4/9
Catches/stumpings	1/–	1/–	15/–	18/–
- Source: CricketArchive, 30 April 2021

Nancy May Williams (born 4 March 1959) is a New Zealand former cricketer who played as an all-rounder, batting right-handed and bowling either right-arm off break or medium pace. She appeared in 4 Test matches and 19 One Day Internationals for New Zealand between 1985 and 1992. She played domestic cricket for Canterbury and Wellington.
