= Christina Matthews =

Australian cricketer (born 1959)

Christina Matthews AM
Personal information
- Full name: Christina Matthews
- Born: 26 December 1959 (age 66); Kew, Melbourne, Australia
- Batting: Right-handed
- Role: Wicket-keeper

International information
- National side: Australia (1984–1995)
- Test debut (cap 100): 21 January 1984 v India
- Last Test: 28 February 1995 v New Zealand
- ODI debut (cap 36): 19 January 1984 v India
- Last ODI: 20 February 1995 v New Zealand

Domestic team information
- Years: Team
- 1983/84–1987/88: Victoria
- 1989/90–1990/91: Australian Capital Territory
- 1991/92–1994/95: New South Wales

Career statistics
Competition	WTest	WODI	WFC	WLA
Matches	20	47	45	87
Runs scored	180	141	569	239
Batting average	10.58	9.40	15.80	8.53
100s/50s	0/0	0/0	0/0	0/0
Top score	34*	9.40	43	41*
Balls bowled	6	–	18	–
Wickets	0	–	2	–
Bowling average	–	–	5.50	–
5 wickets in innings	0	–	0	–
10 wickets in match	0	–	0	–
Best bowling	–	–	2/3	–
Catches/stumpings	46/12	35/14	29/25	73/34
- Source: CricketArchive, 23 January 2023

Christina Matthews AM (née White; born 26 December 1959) is an Australian former cricketer who played as a wicket-keeper and right-handed batter. She appeared in 20 Test matches and 47 One Day Internationals for Australia between 1984 and 1995, including playing at the 1988 and 1993 World Cups. She played domestic cricket for Victoria, Australian Capital Territory and New South Wales.

She is Australia's most capped female Test player, and holds the record for the most dismissals by a wicket-keeper in Women's Test matches.

Matthews has held a number of senior positions in cricket administration in Australia, including from 2011 Chief Executive of the Western Australian Cricket Association, replacing Graeme Wood.

She was appointed a Member of the Order of Australia in the 2024 Australia Day Honours for her "significant service to cricket as a player and administrator, and to women".
