= Karen Smithies =

English cricketer (born 1969)

Karen Smithies OBE
Personal information
- Full name: Karen Smithies
- Born: 20 March 1969 (age 57); Ashby-de-la-Zouch, Leicestershire, England
- Batting: Left-handed
- Bowling: Right-arm medium
- Role: All-rounder

International information
- National side: England (1986–2000)
- Test debut (cap 107): 21 August 1987 v Australia
- Last Test: 15 July 1999 v India
- ODI debut (cap 43): 26 July 1986 v India
- Last ODI: 15 February 2000 v New Zealand

Domestic team information
- Years: Team
- 1985–1999: East Midlands
- 2000: Nottinghamshire

Career statistics
Competition	WTest	WODI	WFC	WLA
Matches	15	69	17	154
Runs scored	443	921	536	2,930
Batting average	22.15	23.61	23.30	30.84
100s/50s	0/3	1/1	0/4	1/14
Top score	64	110*	64	110*
Balls bowled	2,196	2,681	2,527	6,644
Wickets	16	64	20	177
Bowling average	45.56	18.65	41.10	15.37
5 wickets in innings	0	0	0	1
10 wickets in match	0	0	0	0
Best bowling	3/63	3/6	3/63	6/15
Catches/stumpings	11/–	21/–	12/–	43/1
- Source: CricketArchive, 21 February 2021

Karen Smithies OBE (née Hicken; born 20 March 1969) is a former England cricketer who played as a left-handed batter and right-arm medium bowler. She appeared in 15 Test matches and 69 One Day Internationals between 1986 and 2000, and was captain of England between 1993 and 2000. In 1993, she led England to their second World Cup title, and was the joint leading wicket-taker in the tournament. She played domestic cricket for East Midlands and Nottinghamshire. Following her playing career, Smithies has worked in South Africa, managing teams in their domestic competitions.

Smithies was appointed Officer of the Order of the British Empire (OBE) in the 1994 New Year Honours for services to ladies' cricket.
