= Karen Gunn =

New Zealand cricketer (born 1962)

Personal information
- Full name: Karen Vivienne Gunn
- Born: 12 May 1962 (age 64); Christchurch, New Zealand
- Batting: Right-handed
- Bowling: Right-arm medium
- Role: All-rounder; occasional wicket-keeper

International information
- National side: New Zealand (1985–1993)
- Test debut (cap 85): 23 February 1985 v India
- Last Test: 12 February 1992 v England
- ODI debut (cap 41): 7 February 1985 v Australia
- Last ODI: 1 August 1993 v England

Domestic team information
- Years: Team
- 1982/83–1992/93: Canterbury

Career statistics
Competition	WTest	WODI	WFC	WLA
Matches	9	45	45	65
Runs scored	194	461	624	715
Batting average	16.16	18.44	20.80	20.42
100s/50s	0/0	0/1	0/1	0/1
Top score	49	52	52	52
Balls bowled	1,903	2,753	3,351	3,669
Wickets	11	53	49	70
Bowling average	38.90	21.00	17.30	19.90
5 wickets in innings	0	1	0	1
10 wickets in match	0	0	0	0
Best bowling	3/40	5/22	4/18	5/22
Catches/stumpings	6/1	14/–	25/6	21/–
- Source: Cricinfo, 30 April 2021

Karen Vivienne Gunn (born 12 May 1962) is a former cricketer from New Zealand who played as a right-handed batter, right-arm medium bowler and occasional wicket-keeper. She appeared in nine test matches and forty-five One Day Internationals for New Zealand between 1985 and 1993. Her final professional appearance was in the final of the 1993 Women's Cricket World Cup. She played domestic cricket for Canterbury.
