= Jan Brittin =

English cricketer

Jan Brittin MBE
Personal information
- Full name: Janette Ann Brittin
- Born: 4 July 1959; Kingston upon Thames, Surrey, England
- Died: 11 September 2017 (aged 58); Sussex, England
- Batting: Right-handed
- Bowling: Right-arm off break
- Role: All-rounder

International information
- National side: England (1979–1998)
- Test debut (cap 82): 16 June 1979 v West Indies
- Last Test: 21 August 1998 v Australia
- ODI debut (cap 25): 6 June 1979 v West Indies
- Last ODI: 18 July 1998 v Australia

Domestic team information
- Years: Team
- 1978–1980: Sussex
- 1981–1997: Surrey

Career statistics
Competition	WTest	WODI	WFC	WLA
Matches	27	63	43	135
Runs scored	1,935	2,120	2,878	4,905
Batting average	49.61	42.42	43.60	46.71
100s/50s	5/11	5/8	7/16	6/29
Top score	167	138*	167	138*
Balls bowled	1,188	296	1,902	1,191
Wickets	9	8	28	33
Bowling average	46.11	23.75	26.71	20.33
5 wickets in innings	0	0	0	0
10 wickets in match	0	0	0	0
Best bowling	2/15	3/16	4/16	3/5
Catches/stumpings	12/–	26/–	23/–	62/–
- Source: CricketArchive, 28 February 2021

Janette Ann Brittin MBE (4 July 1959 – 11 September 2017) was an English cricketer who played as a right-handed batter and right-arm off break bowler. She appeared in 27 Tests and 63 ODIs for England between 1979 and 1998. She played domestic cricket for Sussex and Surrey.

Brittin was part of the England team that triumphed in the 1993 Women's Cricket World Cup, and was appointed a Member of the Order of the British Empire (MBE) in the 1999 Birthday Honours for services to women's cricket.

One of England's most successful batters, her total of 1,935 runs is a Test record, as are her five Test centuries. She was also the first woman to score 1,000 runs in ODIs for England. Brittin holds the record for taking the most catches, 19, in Women's Cricket World Cup history.

As a child, Brittin lived in Chessington, Surrey. She represented English schools at athletics, and later became a rare triple international, in indoor hockey and indoor cricket as well as cricket. She was well known for her feats of athleticism on the cricket field; her England team-mate Enid Bakewell has said that "One of the reasons they changed from playing in skirts to trousers was JB’s diving stops!"

After retiring from the game in 1998 she became a teacher, but also coached at Surrey County Cricket Club. She died of cancer on 11 September 2017, aged 58. In July 2019, Surrey County Cricket Club named a room in the members' pavilion in her honour. In November 2021, she was inducted to the ICC Cricket Hall of Fame.
