= Jennifer Turner (cricketer) =

New Zealand cricketer (born 1969)

Personal information
- Full name: Jennifer Ann Turner
- Born: 5 September 1969 (age 57); Lincoln, New Zealand
- Batting: Right-handed
- Bowling: Right-arm medium
- Role: Bowler

International information
- National side: New Zealand (1988–1994)
- Test debut (cap 93): 18 January 1990 v Australia
- Last Test: 12 February 1992 v England
- ODI debut (cap 51): 29 November 1988 v Ireland
- Last ODI: 22 January 1994 v Australia

Domestic team information
- Years: Team
- 1985/86–1986/87: Southern Districts
- 1987/88–1995/96: Canterbury

Career statistics
Competition	WTest	WODI	WFC	WLA
Matches	6	30	31	64
Runs scored	30	54	247	182
Batting average	4.28	4.50	13.00	10.70
100s/50s	0/0	0/0	0/0	0/0
Top score	11*	15	36	31
Balls bowled	1,312	1,592	3,7346	2,969
Wickets	19	28	78	86
Bowling average	24.68	24.82	15.20	14.39
5 wickets in innings	0	1	0	1
10 wickets in match	0	0	0	0
Best bowling	3/42	5/5	4/12	5/5
Catches/stumpings	2/–	5/–	9/–	7/–
- Source: CricketArchive, 29 April 2021

Jennifer Ann Turner (born 5 September 1969) is a New Zealand former cricketer who played as a right-arm medium bowler. She appeared in 6 Test matches and 30 One Day Internationals for New Zealand between 1988 and 1994. She played domestic cricket for Southern Districts and Canterbury.
