= Julie Harris (cricketer) =

New Zealand cricketer (born 1960)

Personal information
- Full name: Julie Elizabeth Harris
- Born: 24 November 1960 (age 65); Lower Hutt, New Zealand
- Batting: Right-handed
- Bowling: Right-arm medium
- Role: Bowler

International information
- National side: New Zealand (1987–1997)
- Test debut (cap 90): 18 January 1990 v Australia
- Last Test: 12 July 1996 v England
- ODI debut (cap 46): 21 January 1987 v Australia
- Last ODI: 22 February 1997 v Australia

Domestic team information
- Years: Team
- 1982/83–1997/98: Wellington

Career statistics
Competition	WTest	WODI	WFC	WLA
Matches	10	45	52	103
Runs scored	26	99	740	650
Batting average	6.50	8.25	17.20	13.00
100s/50s	0/0	0/0	0/2	0/0
Top score	9	19*	63	44*
Balls bowled	1,796	2,486	6,492	5,640
Wickets	15	61	139	131
Bowling average	46.06	18.42	18.36	19.16
5 wickets in innings	0	0	2	0
10 wickets in match	0	0	0	0
Best bowling	4/119	4/8	6/42	4/8
Catches/stumpings	1/–	9/–	16/–	22/–
- Source: CricketArchive, 27 April 2021

Julie Elizabeth Harris (born 24 November 1960) is a New Zealand former cricketer who played as a right-arm medium bowler. She appeared in 10 Test matches and 45 One Day Internationals for New Zealand between 1987 and 1997. She played domestic cricket for Wellington.

Harris took a hat-trick at the 1993 World Cup, the second in World Cup history, in a match against the West Indies.
