= Lyn Larsen =

Australian cricketer (born 1963)

Lyn Larsen AM
Personal information
- Full name: Lynette Ann Larsen
- Born: 3 February 1963 (age 63); Lismore, New South Wales, Australia
- Batting: Right-handed
- Bowling: Right-arm leg break
- Role: All-rounder

International information
- National side: Australia (1984–1994)
- Test debut (cap 98): 21 January 1984 v India
- Last Test: 19 February 1992 v England
- ODI debut (cap 40): 8 February 1984 v India
- Last ODI: 22 January 1994 v New Zealand

Domestic team information
- Years: Team
- 1979/80–1993/94: New South Wales
- 1994/95: Australian Capital Territory

Career statistics
Competition	WTest	WODI	WFC	WLA
Matches	15	49	58	98
Runs scored	410	426	1,249	927
Batting average	41.00	20.28	31.22	23.17
100s/50s	0/3	0/2	0/7	0/3
Top score	86	62	86	71*
Balls bowled	2,124	1,870	5,679	4,101
Wickets	26	24	82	70
Bowling average	18.73	31.79	17.26	21.15
5 wickets in innings	0	0	2	0
10 wickets in match	0	0	0	0
Best bowling	4/33	3/19	6/20	4/8
Catches/stumpings	11/–	11/–	27/–	24/–
- Source: CricketArchive, 25 January 2023

Lynette Ann Larsen AM (born 3 February 1963) is an Australian former cricketer who played as an all-rounder, batting right-handed and bowling right-arm leg break. She appeared in 15 Test matches and 49 One Day Internationals for Australia between 1984 and 1994, and captained the side between 1986 and 1993. She played domestic cricket for New South Wales and Australian Capital Territory.

She captained Australia in ten Test matches, including 5 victories. The number of Test matches in which she was captain, number of matches won, and percentage of victories, are all records for Australia. She also captained the side in 39 One Day Internationals, winning 27 and losing 10, including winning the World Cup in 1988.

In all, Larsen played in 15 Test matches, scoring 410 runs at a batting average of 41.00 with a high score of 86. She also bowled 354 overs of leg spin, taking 26 wickets at a bowling average of 18.73 and giving away under 1.5 runs per over.

Larsen was inducted into the Sport Australia Hall of Fame in 1999. She was inducted into the New South Wales Cricket Hall of Fame in 2010, along with Stan McCabe and Mark Waugh. In 2013 Larsen became the first female cricketer to be appointed to the Sydney Cricket Ground Trust.
