= Belinda Haggett =

Australian cricketer (born 1962)

Personal information
- Full name: Belinda Jane Haggett
- Born: 12 October 1962 (age 64); Sydney, Australia
- Batting: Right-handed
- Bowling: Right-arm medium
- Role: All-rounder

International information
- National side: Australia (1986–1993)
- Test debut (cap 108): 1 August 1987 v England
- Last Test: 19 February 1992 v England
- ODI debut (cap 49): 20 January 1986 v New Zealand
- Last ODI: 29 July 1993 v New Zealand

Domestic team information
- Years: Team
- 1981/82–1992/93: New South Wales

Career statistics
Competition	WTest	WODI	WFC	WLA
Matches	10	37	37	77
Runs scored	762	913	1,424	1,970
Batting average	58.61	30.43	37.47	31.77
100s/50s	2/4	0/6	3/5	0/13
Top score	144	80	144	80
Balls bowled	6	228	1,044	804
Wickets	0	3	16	11
Bowling average	–	33.66	15.25	22.63
5 wickets in innings	0	0	0	0
10 wickets in match	0	0	0	0
Best bowling	–	1/13	4/30	2/11
Catches/stumpings	2/–	9/–	15/–	21/–
- Source: CricketArchive, 10 January 2023

Belinda Jane Haggett (married name Belinda Robertson; born 12 October 1962) is an Australian former cricketer who played as a right-handed batter and right-arm medium bowler. She appeared in 10 Test matches and 37 One Day Internationals for Australia between 1986 and 1993. She played domestic cricket for New South Wales.

== Cricket career ==
A right-handed batter and occasional right-arm medium pace bowler, Haggett played 10 Test matches for Australia between 1987 and 1992, scoring 762 runs including four half-centuries and two centuries. On her Test debut, she scored 126 runs against England. She made a further century, and her highest Test score, in February 1991 against India, scoring 144.

Haggett also played 37 One Day Internationals for Australia, scoring 913 runs with an average in the low-thirties.
