= Australia women's cricket team in England in 1976 =

International cricket tour

Australian women's cricket team in England in 1976
	England	Australia
- Dates: 29 May – 8 August 1976
Captains	Rachael Heyhoe Flint	Anne Gordon

Test series
- Result: 3-match series drawn 0–0
Most runs	Rachael Heyhoe Flint (350)	Jan Lumsden (260)
Most wickets	Enid Bakewell (10)	Raelee Thompson (10)

One Day International series
- Results: England won the 3-match series 2–1
Most runs	Megan Lear (109)	Lorraine Hill (132)
Most wickets	Jacqueline Court (5)	Karen Price (3)

The Australian women's cricket team toured England between May and August 1976. The test series against England women's cricket team was played for the Women's Ashes, which England were defending. The series was drawn 0–0, meaning that England retained the Ashes. England won the three-match ODI series 2–1. The second ODI, won by England, was the first women's cricket match ever played at Lord's.

== Squads ==
England	Australia
Rachael Heyhoe Flint (c); Enid Bakewell; Katherine Brown; Jacqueline Court; Jill Cruwys; Julia Greenwood; Shirley Hodges (wk); Glynis Hullah; Megan Lear; Mary Pilling; Lynne Read; June Stephenson; Jan Southgate; Lynne Thomas; Chris Watmough	Anne Gordon (c); Wendy Blunsden; Lorraine Hill; Wendy Hills; Margaret Jennings (wk); Jan Lumsden; Marie Lutschini; Patsy May; Betty McDonald; Kerry Mortimer; Karen Price; Julie Robinson (wk); Raelee Thompson; Janette Tredrea; Sharon Tredrea

== Tour Matches ==
=== 1-day single innings matches ===
29 May 1976
Scorecard

Thames Valley; 64 (35.5 overs)	v	Australia; 66/0 (15.3 overs)
Pauline Gibbon 28 (–); Lorraine Hill 4/18 (6 overs)		Lorraine Hill 40* (–)

Australia Women won by 10 wickets
Aspro Sports Ground, Slough
Umpires: Sheila Hill (Eng) and Pip Vyvyan (Eng)

- Australia Women won the toss and elected to field.

30 May 1976
Scorecard

Women's Cricket Association President's XI; 198/2d (70 overs)	v	Australia; 162/5 (44 overs)
Susan Goatman 101* (–); Anne Gordon 1/3 (7 overs)		Anne Gordon 47* (–); Julia Greenwood 3/15 (10 overs)

Match drawn
Uxbridge Cricket Club Ground, Uxbridge
Umpires: Peggy Culver (Eng) and Isabel Nowell-Smith (Eng)

- Australia Women won the toss and elected to field.

2 June 1976
Scorecard

Australia; 210/5d (53 overs)	v	Middlesex; 98/7 (57 overs)
Janette Tredrea 64 (–); Val Castle 2/55 (12 overs)		June Green 32 (–); Lorraine Hill 2/10 (8 overs)

Match drawn
Uxbridge Cricket Club Ground, Uxbridge
Umpires: May Howard (Eng) and G Irwin (Eng)

- Toss not known.

4 June 1976
Scorecard

Australia; 177/3d (48 overs)	v	Civil Service; 88 (47.4 overs)
Margaret Jennings 66 (–); Dot Fearnley 1/69 (20 overs)		Julia Goodwin 19 (–); Marie Lutschini 3/20 (9 overs)

Australia Women won by 89 runs
Civil Service Sports Ground, Chiswick
Umpires: Peggy Culver (Eng) and Esme Irwin (Eng)

- Australia Women won the toss and elected to bat.

9 June 1976
Scorecard

Australia; 213/0d (54.1 overs)	v	Yorkshire; 62/6 (57 overs)
Lorraine Hill 108* (–)		June Stephenson 46 (–); Kerry Mortimer 2/6 (6 overs)

Match drawn
Tickhill Sports Ground, Tickhill
Umpires: Margaret Loomes (Eng) and G York (Eng)

- Australia Women won the toss and elected to bat.

16 June 1976
Scorecard

Australia; 111/1 (26 overs)	v	Lancashire and Cheshire
Wendy Hills 45* (–); Ann Hall 1/35 (10 overs)

Match drawn
The Oval, St Helens
Umpires: A Cotter (Eng) and Mike Leddy (Eng)

- Lancashire and Cheshire Women won the toss and elected to field.

23 June 1976
Scorecard

Australia; 209/6d (57.4 overs)	v	West of England; 86 (56.2 overs)
Lorraine Hill 58 (–); Lynne Thomas 2/42 (16 overs)		Lynne Thomas 40 (–); Betty McDonald 4/11 (15.2 overs)

Australia Women won by 123 runs
The Maer Ground, Exmouth
Umpires: Peggy Culver (Eng) and Kay Green (Eng)

- West of England Women won the toss and elected to field.

30 June 1976
Scorecard

Australia; 230/4d (55 overs)	v	West Midlands; 150/8 (68 overs)
Anne Gordon 77 (–); Rosalind Heggs 2/68 (14 overs)		Rachael Heyhoe Flint 63 (–); Betty McDonald 4/32 (21 overs)

Match drawn
Danescourt, Wolverhampton
Umpires: L Evans (Eng) and T Pritchard (Eng)

- West Midlands Women won the toss and elected to field.

7 July 1976
Scorecard

Australia; 224/2d (50 overs)	v	East Midlands; 73 (46.2 overs)
Lorraine Hill 108* (–); Mal Deeman 2/115 (22 overs)		Mal Deeman 37 (–); Karen Price 5/10 (10 overs)

Australia Women won by 151 runs
Snibston Colliery Ground, Coalville
Umpires: F Palmer (Eng) and A Swift (Eng)

- Australia Women won the toss and elected to bat.

14 July 1976
Scorecard

Australia; 188/3d (56 overs)	v	East Anglia; 139/7 (74 overs)
Janette Tredrea 86 (–); Jacqueline Wainwright 2/33 (14 overs)		Julia Lloyd 45 (–); Raelee Thompson 3/21 (15 overs)

Match drawn
Heath Park, Hemel Hempstead
Umpires: Isabel Norwell-Smith (Eng) and Pip Vyvyan (Eng)

- Australia Women won the toss and elected to bat.

18 July 1976
Scorecard

Australia; 211/0d (52 overs)	v	Kent; 184/4 (62 overs)
Lorraine Hill 108* (–)		Megan Lear 86* (–); Marie Lutschini 3/21 (15 overs)

Match drawn
The Bat and Ball Ground, Gravesend
Umpires: Sheila Hill (Eng) and Elizabeth Riley (Eng)

- Kent Women won the toss and elected to field.

21 July 1976
Scorecard

Australia; 173/8d (57 overs)	v	Surrey; 104 (54.5 overs)
Anne Gordon 56 (–); Patsy Lovell 2/22 (9 overs)		Margaret Peear 23 (–); Anne Gordon 2/8 (8 overs)

Australia Women won by 69 runs
Mitcham Cricket Green, Mitcham
Umpires: B Hill (Eng) and Veronica Reichwald (Eng)

- Australia Women won the toss and elected to bat.

29 July 1976
Scorecard

Australia; 174/4d (53.4 overs)	v	Sussex; 134/3 (63 overs)
Janette Tredrea 101* (–); E Stones 1/8 (2 overs)		Shirley Hodges 72* (–); Kerry Mortimer 1/3 (12 overs)

Match drawn
Nyewood Lane, Bognor Regis
Umpires: May Howard (Eng) and Esme Irwin (Eng)

- Australia Women won the toss and elected to bat.

6 August 1976
Scorecard

Young England; 122 (77.5 overs)	v	Australia; 123/3 (30.3 overs)
Jan Southgate 50 (–); Karen Price 4/31 (17 overs)		Janette Tredrea 56* (–); Catherine Mowat 2/16 (5.3 overs)

Australia Women won by 7 wickets
Kew Green, Kew
Umpires: Jane Ayres (Eng) and Anne Garton (Eng)

- Australia Women won the toss and elected to field.

=== 2-day matches ===
6 – 7 June 1976
Scorecard

South of England	v	Australia
130 (91.2 overs); Eleanor Tarbox 26 (–); Sharon Tredrea 5/21 (19 overs)		140/2d (47 overs); Lorraine Hill 52 (–); June Green 1/4 (4 overs)
80 (56.1 overs); Shirley Hodges 26* (–); Sharon Tredrea 4/12 (14 overs)		74/4 (30.4 overs); Anne Gordon 26* (–); Jacqueline Court 2/13 (7 overs)

Australia Women won by 6 wickets
Recreation Ground, Banstead
Umpires: Veronica Reichwald (Eng) and Pyp Vyvyan (Eng)

- Australia Women won the toss and elected to field.

13 – 14 June 1976
Scorecard

Australia	v	North of England
148 (69 overs); Margaret Jennings 34 (–); Julia Greenwood 5/21 (16 overs)		125 (70 overs); Enid Bakewell 98 (–); Raelee Thompson 4/25 (17 overs)
149/0d (41.1 overs); Lorraine Hill 100* (–)		125/2 (44 overs); Enid Bakewell 81 (–); Anne Gordon 1/13 (9 overs)

Match drawn
College Grove Ground, Wakefield
Umpires: May Howard (Eng) and Margaret Loomes (Eng)

- Australia Women won the toss and elected to bat.

26 – 27 June 1976
Scorecard

Australia	v	West of England
188/6d (76 overs); Lorraine Hill 73 (–); Wendy Williams 3/31 (13 overs)		143 (64.3 overs); Lynne Thomas 67 (–); Raelee Thompson 4/23 (12.3 overs)
142/1d (48 overs); Lorraine Hill 84* (–); Carol Evans 1/17 (10 overs)		88/9 (56 overs); Jill Cruwys 33 (–); Sharon Tredrea 4/10 (14 overs)

Match drawn
Wagon Works Ground, Gloucester
Umpires: Peggy Culver (Eng) and June Bragger (Eng)

- Australia Women won the toss and elected to bat.

10 – 11 July 1976
Scorecard

Australia	v	East of England
225/8d (81 overs); Wendy Blunsden 46* (–); Isobel Crocker 3/55 (20 overs)		144/9d (75 overs); Chris Watmough 94 (–); Karen Price 2/15 (9 overs)
110/3d (25.3 overs); Wendy Hills 43 (–); Christine Mason 2/24 (6.3 overs)		129/6 (58 overs); Julia Lloyd 41 (–); Wendy Blunsden 2/49 (15 overs)

Match drawn
Woodside, Watford
Umpires: Sheila Hill (Eng) and Esme Irwin (Eng)

- East of England Women won the toss and elected to field.

== Test Series ==
=== 1st Test ===
19 – 21 June 1976
Scorecard

Australia	v	England
273/6d (94.1 overs); Janette Tredrea 67 (–); June Stephenson 2/40 (18 overs)		254/6d (127 overs); Rachael Heyhoe Flint 110 (–); Raelee Thompson 3/79 (36 overs)
125/6 (56 overs); Margaret Jennings 52 (–); Enid Bakewell 3/11 (11 overs)

Match drawn
Old Trafford, Manchester
Umpires: Esme Irwin (Eng) and Peggy Culver (Eng)

- England Women won the toss and elected to field.
- Glynis Hullah, Jan Southgate and Julia Greenwood (Eng) all made their WTest debuts.

=== 2nd Test ===
3 – 5 July 1976
Scorecard

England	v	Australia
242/9d (109 overs); Enid Bakewell 75 (–); Raelee Thompson 3/42 (24 overs)		236/7d (104.4 overs); Margaret Jennings 104 (–); Glynis Hullah 2/32 (16 overs)
228/2d (77.5 overs); Lynne Thomas 90 (–)		169/6 (57 overs); Lorraine Hill 47 (–); June Stephenson 2/20 (11 overs)

Match drawn
Edgbaston, Birmingham
Umpires: June Bragger (Eng) and Pip Vyvyan (Eng)

- England Women won the toss and elected to bat.
- Megan Lear (Eng) and Betty McDonald (Aus) made their WTest debuts.

=== 3rd Test ===
24 – 27 July 1976
Scorecard

England	v	Australia
134 (102.2 overs); Lynne Thomas 73 (–); Karen Price 3/6 (14.2 overs)		379 (139.4 overs); Jan Lumsden 123 (–); June Stephenson 2/58 (39 overs)
326 (264 overs); Rachael Heyhoe Flint 179 (–); Marie Cornish 3/70 (54 overs)

Match drawn
The Oval, London
Umpires: May Howard (Eng) and Sheila Hill (Eng)

- England Women won the toss and elected to bat.
- Jacqueline Court (Eng) made her WTest debut.

== WODI Series ==
=== 1st ODI ===
1 August 1976
Scorecard

Australia; 214/5 (40 overs)	v	England; 127/6 (40 overs)
Lorraine Hill 106 (–); Jacqueline Court 2/37 (8 overs)		Megan Lear 53* (–); Karen Price 3/12 (8 overs)

Australia Women won by 87 runs
St Lawrence Ground, Canterbury
Umpires: Elizabeth Riley (Eng) and Kay Green (Eng)

- Australia Women won the toss and elected to bat.
- Jan Southgate (Eng), Marie Cornish, Jan Lumsden, Karen Price, Julie Stockton and Janette Tredrea (Aus) all made their WODI debuts.

=== 2nd ODI ===
4 August 1976
Scorecard

Australia; 161 (59.4 overs)	v	England; 162/2 (56.2 overs)
Sharon Tredrea 54 (–); Jan Southgate 2/28 (9 overs)		Chris Watmough 50* (–); Patsy May 1/24 (12 overs)

England Women won by 8 wickets
Lord's, London
Umpires: Isabel Nowell-Smith (Eng) and June Bragger (Eng)

- Australia Women won the toss and elected to bat.
- Wendy Hills (Aus) made her WODI debut.

=== 3rd ODI ===
8 August 1976
Scorecard

Australia; 119/9 (40 overs)	v	England; 120/1 (36.1 overs)
Anne Gordon 50* (–); Jacqueline Court 3/20 (8 overs)		Megan Lear 56* (–); Anne Gordon 1/28 (8 overs)

England Women won by 9 wickets
Trent Bridge, Nottingham
Umpires: May Howard (Eng) and Sheila Hill (Eng)

- Australia Women won the toss and elected to bat.
- Kerry Mortimer (Aus) made her WODI debut.
