= Australia women's cricket team in the West Indies in 1975–76 =

Australian women's cricket team in the West Indies in 1975–76
	West Indies	Australia
- Dates: 7 May – 14 May 1976
Captains	Louise Browne	Anne Gordon

Test series
- Result: 2-match series drawn 0–0
Most runs	Louise Browne (139)	Lorraine Hill (113)
Most wickets	Vivalyn Latty-Scott (8)	Marie Lutschini (9)

The Australian women's cricket team toured the West Indies in May 1976. They played the West Indies women's cricket team in two Test matches, which were both drawn. Only one innings was completed in the first Test, and two in the second Test. The matches were the first ever played by a combined West Indies women's team.

== Squads ==
West Indies	Australia
Louise Browne (c); Sheryl Bayley; Beverly Browne; Peggy Fairweather; Yolande Geddes-Hall (wk); Gloria Gill; Vivalyn Latty-Scott; Janet Mitchell (wk); Jasmine Sammy; Nora St. Rose; Menota Tekah; Patricia Whittaker; Grace Williams	Anne Gordon (c); Wendy Blunsden; Lorraine Hill; Wendy Hills; Margaret Jennings (wk); Jan Lumsden; Marie Lutschini; Patsy May; Karen Price; Raelee Thompson; Janette Tredrea; Sharon Tredrea

== Tour matches ==
=== 1-day single innings match: Jamaica v Australia ===
12 May 1976
Scorecard

Australia; 180/5d (50 overs)	v	Jamaica; 141 (– overs)
Janette Tredrea 88* (–); Peggy Fairweather 2/13 (– overs)		Vivalyn Latty-Scott 23 (–); Karen Price 3/23 (9 overs)

Australia Women won by 39 runs
Up-Park Camp, Kingston, Jamaica

- Toss unknown.
- Full scorecard unavailable.

== Test Series ==
=== 1st Test ===
7 – 9 May 1976
Scorecard

West Indies	v	Australia
282 (112.5 overs); Louise Browne 67 (–); Marie Lutschini 4/48 (22 overs)		268/8 (119 overs); Lorraine Hill 73 (–); Vivalyn Latty-Scott 5/48 (41 overs)

Match drawn
Jarrett Park, Montego Bay, Jamaica
Umpires: Johnny Gayle (WI) and Wesley Malcolm (WI)

- West Indies Women won the toss and elected to bat.
- Wendy Hills, Jan Lumsden, Marie Lutschini, Janette Tredrea (Aus), Louise Browne, Sheryl Bayley, Beverly Browne, Peggy Fairweather, Gloria Gill, Vivalyn Latty-Scott, Janet Mitchell, Jasmine Sammy, Menota Tekah, Patricia Whittaker and Grace Williams (WI) all made their WTest debuts.

=== 2nd Test ===
14 – 16 May 1976
Scorecard

West Indies	v	Australia
226 (134 overs); Patricia Whittaker 61 (–); Marie Lutschini 5/51 (37 overs)		218 (121.3 overs); Janette Tredrea 43 (–); Vivalyn Latty-Scott 3/36 (33.3 overs)
89/3 (35 overs); Louise Browne 52* (–); Anne Gordon 2/18 (7 overs)

Match drawn
Sabina Park, Kingston, Jamaica
Umpires: Johnny Gayle (WI) and R Maxwell (WI)

- West Indies Women won the toss and elected to bat.
- Yolande Geddes-Hall and Nora St. Rose (WI) both made their WTest debuts.
