= Australia women's cricket team in New Zealand in 1974–75 =

	New Zealand	Australia
- Dates: 21 February – 21 March 1975
Captains	Trish McKelvey	Wendy Blunsden

Test series
- Result: 1-match series drawn 0–0
Most runs	Barbara Bevege (140)	Lorraine Hill (118)
Most wickets	Jackie Lord (4)	Sharon Tredrea (7)

The Australia women's national cricket team toured New Zealand in February and March 1975. They played against New Zealand in one Test match, which was drawn.

== Squads ==
New Zealand	Australia
Trish McKelvey (c); Barbara Bevege; Shirley Cowles; Judi Doull; Jackie Lord; Carol Marett; Maureen Peters; Lynda Prichard; Sue Rattray; Edna Ryan (wk); Jill Saulbrey	Wendy Blunsden (c); Lynn Denholm; Lorraine Hill; Margaret Jennings (wk); Patsy May; Jackie Potter; Karen Price; Raelee Thompson; Sharon Tredrea; Wendy Weir; Bev Wilson

== Tour Matches ==
=== 60-over match: Canterbury President's XI v Australia ===
21 February 1975
Scorecard

Australia; 207/4 (60 overs)	v	Canterbury President's XI; 120/7 (60 overs)
Bev Wilson 49 (–); Sally Russell 1/8 (6 overs)		Lesley Murdoch 29 (–); Wendy Blunsden 2/9 (9 overs)

Australia Women won by 87 runs
Hagley Oval, Christchurch
Umpires: Frank Fielding (NZ) and Lewis Johnston (NZ)

- Canterbury President's XI won the toss and elected to field.

=== 2-day match: Canterbury v Australia ===
23 – 24 February 1975
Scorecard

Australia	v	Canterbury
77/3d (62 overs); Bev Wilson 41 (–); Jackie Lord 2/14 (15 overs)		54/3d (39 overs); Ann McKenna 23* (–); Raelee Thompson 1/9 (7 overs)
99/6d (46.3 overs); Margaret Jennings 22 (–); Sue Rattray 4/39 (15 overs)

Match drawn
Hagley Oval, Christchurch

- Canterbury Women won the toss and elected to field.

=== 60-over match: Otago v Australia ===
26 February 1975
Scorecard

Australia; 233/4 (60 overs)	v	Otago; 139/4 (60 overs)
Bev Wilson 110 (–); Daphne Robinson 1/18 (13 overs)		June Gill 51 (–); Sharon Tredrea 1/12 (12 overs)

Australia Women won by 94 runs
Logan Park, Dunedin

- Toss not known.

=== 1-day single-innings match: Otago v Australia ===
1 March 1975
Scorecard

Australia; 204/4d (60 overs)	v	Otago; 77 (42.3 overs)
Lynn Denholm 137 (–); Carol Marett 2/52 (23 overs)		June Gill 13 (–); Patsy May 4/1 (5.3 overs)

Australia Women won by 127 runs
Logan Park, Dunedin

- Otago Women won the toss and elected to field.
- Match was originally scheduled to begin on 28 February 1975 as a 2-day match, but after rain prevented any play on the first day the game was reduced to a 1-day single-innings match.

=== 45-over match: Wellington v Australia ===
3 March 1975
Scorecard

Wellington; 158/6 (45 overs)	v	Australia; 159/1 (41 overs)
Barbara Bevege 66* (–); Wendy Weir 3/56 (9 overs)		Lynn Denholm 92* (–); Carol Salmon 1/30 (6 overs)

Australia Women won by 9 wickets
Anderson Park, Wellington

- Australia Women won the toss and elected to field.

=== 2-day match: Wellington v Australia ===
5 – 6 March 1975
Scorecard

Australia	v	Wellington
155/7d (70 overs); Jackie Potter 72* (–); Jill Saulbrey 3/33 (26 overs)		96/6d (55 overs); Prue Hyman 42* (–); Sharon Tredrea 3/19 (16 overs)
115/3d (50 overs); Bev Wilson 34 (–); Carol Salmon 2/22 (12 overs)		47/2 (20 overs); Barbara Bevege 18* (–); Karen Price 1/13 (7 overs)

Match drawn
Hutt Recreation Ground, Lower Hutt
Umpires: David Abbott (NZ) and Dave Greenfield (NZ)

- Wellington Women won the toss and elected to field.

=== 2-day match: Auckland v Australia ===
8, 10 March 1975
Scorecard

Auckland	v	Australia
136 (96.6 overs); Glenys Page 30* (–); Wendy Weir 6/43 (18.6 overs)		181/5d (58.5 overs); Bev Wilson 94 (–); Glenys Page 3/46 (12 overs)
187 (98.1 overs); Lynda Prichard 61 (–); Raelee Thompson 4/46 (22 overs)		118/7 (26 overs); Lynn Denholm 47 (–); Lynda Prichard 2/14 (5 overs)

Match drawn
Melville Park, Auckland

- Australia Women won the toss and elected to field.

=== 60-over match: Auckland v Australia ===
11 March 1975
Scorecard

Auckland	v	Australia

Match Abandoned
Melville Park, Auckland

- No toss.
- No play possible due to rain.

=== 1-day match: South Auckland v Australia ===
13 March 1975
Scorecard

Australia	v	South Auckland
119/5d (42 overs); Karen Price 42 (–); Jeanette Dunning 2/37 (10 overs)		73/8d (– overs); Kathie Longhurst 34 (–); Wendy Weir 4/7 (– overs)
59/1d (– overs); Jackie Potter 29* (–); Jeanette Dunning 1/5 (– overs)		66/9 (– overs); Jeanette Dunning 42* (–); Wendy Blunsden 7/31 (– overs)

Match drawn
Bledisloe Park, Pukekohe

- South Auckland Women won the toss and elected to field.

=== 2-day match: North Shore v Australia ===
14 – 15 March 1975
Scorecard

North Shore	v	Australia
61/2d (– overs); Judi Doull 33* (–); Raelee Thompson 1/9 (– overs)		70/4d (– overs); Lynn Denholm 42 (–); Eileen Badham 2/20 (– overs)
73 (– overs); Chris Miller 20 (–); Wendy Weir 4/20 (– overs)

Match drawn
Stanley Bay, Auckland

- Australia Women won the toss and elected to field.

== WTest Series ==
=== 1st Test ===
21 – 24 March 1975
Scorecard

New Zealand	v	Australia
359 (169 overs); Jill Saulbrey 62 (–); Sharon Tredrea 4/100 (46 overs)		362 (177.3 overs); Lorraine Hill 118* (–); Jackie Lord 4/120 (55 overs)
276/6d (145.4 overs); Barbara Bevege 96 (–); Sharon Tredrea 3/71 (20 overs)		47/1 (21 overs); Jackie Potter (27*; Maureen Peters 1/11 (9 overs)

Match drawn
Basin Reserve, Wellington
Umpires: Bruce Bricknell (NZ) and Arthur Hart (NZ)

- New Zealand Women won the toss and elected to bat.
- Lorraine Hill, Jackie Potter, Karen Price, Sharon Tredrea, Wendy Weir (Aus), Barbara Bevege, Maureen Peters, Sue Rattray and Edna Ryan (NZ) all made their WTest debuts.
