= Wendy Weir =

Wendy Weir may refer to:

- Wendy Stites, Australian costume designer, sometimes credited Wendy Weir
- Wendy Weir (cricketer) (1948–2020), Australian cricket player
