= South Australia women's cricket team =

Women's cricket team

South Australia

Personnel
- Captain: Jemma Barsby
- Coach: Mick Delaney

Team information
- Colours: Red Gold Blue
- Founded: First recorded match: 1935
- Home ground: Adelaide Oval; Karen Rolton Oval
- Capacity: 53,500; 5,000

History
- First-class debut: Victoria in 1935 at Albert Cricket Ground, Melbourne
- AWCC wins: 5
- WNCL wins: 1
- WT20C wins: 0
- Official website: SA Scorpions

The South Australia women's cricket team, formerly known as the South Australian Scorpions, is the women's representative cricket team for the Australian State of South Australia. They play their home games at Adelaide Oval and Karen Rolton Oval. They compete in the Women's National Cricket League (WNCL), the premier 50-over women's cricket tournament in Australia. They previously played in the now-defunct Australian Women's Twenty20 Cup and Australian Women's Cricket Championships.

The team is selected and supported by the South Australian Cricket Association (SACA).

== History ==
=== 1935–1996: Australian Women's Cricket Championships ===
South Australia's first recorded match was against Victoria in the Australian Women's Cricket Championships on 10 to 11 January 1935, which they lost by an innings and 184 runs. They continued to regularly play in the Championships until its final season in 1995–96. They won the title five times, making them the third most successful team after Victoria and New South Wales.

=== 1996–present: Women's National Cricket League and Twenty20 Cup ===
The former logo used while the team was known as the Scorpions

South Australia joined the newly established WNCL in 1996–97. They have won one title, in 2015–16. Their best finish in the Australian Women's Twenty20 Cup was third in 2010–11.

== Grounds ==
South Australia have used a number of grounds over the years. Their first recorded home match against Western Australia in 1936 was played at Hindmarsh Oval, Adelaide. Historically they have played the vast majority of their home matches at various grounds in Adelaide.

After the inception of the WNCL in 1996, South Australia began playing regular matches at the Adelaide Oval and its adjacent ground, Adelaide Oval No 2, as well as various other grounds in Adelaide such as Park 25 and University Oval. Outside Adelaide, they played two matches in the 2006–07 WNCL at Centennial Park in Nuriootpa.

In the 2019–20 WNCL, South Australia played all of their home games at the Karen Rolton Oval, a newly upgraded ground located at Park 25 in Adelaide. They also played their three 2020–21 WNCL home games, their two 2021–22 WNCL home games and their six 2022–23 WNCL home games at the Karen Rolton Oval.

== Players ==
=== Current squad ===
Based on squad announced for the 2024/25 season. Players in bold have international caps.

No.	Name	Nat.	Birth date	Batting style	Bowling style	Notes
Batters
2	Emma de Broughe	(Australia)	6 September 2000 (age 26)	Right-handed	Right-arm off break	
21	Bridget Patterson	(Australia)	12 April 1994 (age 32)	Right-handed	Right-arm medium	
17	Courtney Webb	(Australia)	30 November 1999 (age 26)	Right-handed	Right-arm leg break	
All-rounders
57	**Hollie Armitage**	(England)	14 June 1997 (age 29)	Right-handed	Right-arm leg break	
15	Jemma Barsby	(Australia)	4 October 1995 (age 31)	Left-handed	Right-arm off break, Slow left-arm orthodox	Captain
35	Eleanor Larosa	(Australia)	26 November 2005 (age 20)	Left-handed	Left-arm medium	
9	**Tahlia McGrath**	(Australia)	10 November 1995 (age 30)	Right-handed	Right-arm medium	
11	Madeline Penna	(Australia)	30 August 2000 (age 26)	Right-handed	Right-arm leg break	
33	Kate Peterson	(Australia)	3 December 2002 (age 23)	Right-handed	Right-arm fast-medium	
10	**Amanda-Jade Wellington**	(Australia)	29 May 1997 (age 29)	Right-handed	Right-arm leg break	
Wicket-keepers
13	Josie Dooley	(Australia)	21 January 2000 (age 26)	Right-handed	—	
23	Paris Hall	(Australia)	3 November 2003 (age 22)	Left-handed	—	
77	Ellie Johnston	(Australia)	29 January 2003 (age 23)	Right-handed	Right-arm leg break	
Bowlers
20	**Darcie Brown**	(Australia)	7 March 2003 (age 23)	Right-handed	Right-arm medium-fast	
13	Maggie Clark	(Australia)	15 March 2007 (age 19)	Left-handed	Right-arm fast-medium	
24	Emmerson Filsell	(Australia)	15 January 2005 (age 21)	Right-handed	Right-arm medium-fast	
86	Courtney Neale	(Australia)	4 July 1998 (age 28)	Right-handed	Right-arm medium-fast	
27	**Megan Schutt**	(Australia)	15 January 1993 (age 33)	Right-handed	Right-arm medium-fast	
8	Ella Wilson	(Australia)	17 November 2003 (age 22)	Right-handed	Right-arm medium	

=== Notable players ===
Players who have played for South Australia and played internationally are listed below, in order of first international appearance (given in brackets):

- (Australia) Dot Laughton (1949)
- (Australia) Ruth Dow (1957)
- (Australia) Barbara Orchard (1957)
- (Australia) Faith Thomas (1958)
- (Australia) Margaret Jude (1963)
- (Australia) Jill Need (1968)
- (Australia) Wendy Blunsden (1972)
- (Australia) Betty McDonald (1973)
- (Australia) Janette Tredrea (1976)
- (Australia) Jan Lumsden (1976)
- (Australia) Kerry Mortimer (1976)
- (Australia) Jill Kennare (1979)
- (Australia) Jen Jacobs (1979)
- (Australia) Lyn Fullston (1982)
- (Australia) Lynley Hamilton (1982)
- (Australia) Rhonda Kendall (1982)
- (Australia) Annette Fellows (1984)
- (Australia) Wendy Piltz (1984)
- (Australia) Lee-Anne Hunter (1985)
- (Australia) Andrea McCauley (1990)
- (Australia) Joanne Broadbent (1990)
- (Australia) Tunde Juhasz (1991)
- (Australia) Isabelle Tsakiris (1992)
- (Australia) Caroline Ward (1994)
- (Australia) Olivia Magno (1995)
- (Australia) Karen Rolton (1995)
- (England) Charlotte Edwards (1996)
- (England) Beth Morgan (1999)
- (England) Leanne Davis (2000)
- (England) Caroline Atkins (2001)
- (England) Kate Oakenfold (2001)
- (Australia) Kris Britt (2003)
- (England) Jenny Gunn (2004)
- (Australia) Shelley Nitschke (2004)
- (New Zealand) Suzie Bates (2006)
- (England) Sarah Taylor (2006)
- (New Zealand) Sophie Devine (2006)
- (Australia) Emma Sampson (2007)
- (New Zealand) Lucy Doolan (2008)
- (Australia) Lauren Ebsary (2008)
- (Australia) Sarah Coyte (2010)
- (Australia) Megan Schutt (2012)
- (Australia) Tahlia McGrath (2016)
- (Australia) Amanda-Jade Wellington (2016)
- (Australia) Ashleigh Gardner (2017)
- (Fiji) Alicia Dean (2019)
- (Australia) Darcie Brown (2021)

== Coaching staff ==
- Head coach: Mick Delaney
- Assistant coach: Jude Coleman

== Honours ==
- Australian Women's Cricket Championships:
  - Winners (5): 1951–52, 1979–80, 1991–92, 1992–93, 1994–95
- Women's National Cricket League:
  - Winners (1): 2015–16
- Australian Women's Twenty20 Cup:
  - Winners (0):
  - Best finish: 3rd (2010–11)

== 'All Time Best Team' ==
In 2024 SACA members voted for and selected a greatest ever South Australian Women's team consisting of 12 players - called the 'All Time Best Team'.

Women's All Time Best Team
Lauren Ebsary
Jill Kennare
Karen Rolton
Shelley Nitschke
Ruth Dow
Joanne Broadbent
Tegan McPharlin
Lyn Fullston
Megan Schutt
Betty McDonald
Faith Coulthard
Margaret Jude

== See also ==
- South Australian Cricket Association
- South Australia men's cricket team
- Adelaide Strikers (WBBL)
