= Julia Lloyd =

Julia Lloyd may refer to:

- Julia Lloyd (cricketer), English cricketer
- Julia Lloyd (kindergarten) (1867–1955), British philanthropist and educationalist
