= List of Australia women ODI cricketers =

Since the 1973 Women's Cricket World Cup, 149 women have represented the Australia national women's cricket team in Women's One Day International cricket. This list includes all players who have played at least one ODI match and is initially arranged in the order of debut appearance. Where more than one player won their first cap in the same match, those players are initially listed alphabetically by last name at the time of debut (cap criteria used by CricInfo).

== Key ==
General

- † – Wicket-keeper
- First – Year of debut
- Last – Year of latest game
- Mat – Number of matches played

Batting

- Runs – Runs scored in career
- HS – Highest score
- Avg – Runs scored per dismissal
- * – Batsman remained not out
- 50 – Number of half centuries
- 100 – Centuries scored

Bowling

- Balls – Balls bowled in career
- Wkt – Wickets taken in career
- BBI – Best bowling in an innings
- Ave – Average runs per wicket
- 5WI – Five wickets or more in a match

Fielding

- Ca – Catches taken
- St – Stumpings taken

== Players ==
Statistics are correct as of 2 April 2026.

General					Batting					Bowling					Fielding		Ref
Cap	Name	First	Last	Mat	Runs	HS	Avg	50	100	Balls	Wkt	BBI	Ave	5WI	Ca	St	Ref
1	Wendy Blunsden	1973	1976	8	20	10	20.00	0	0	224	1	1/7	129.00	0	0	—	
2	Elaine Bray	1973	1978	8	89	40	17.80	0	0	—	—	—	—	—	0	—	
3	Anne Gordon	1973	1976	8	99	50*	19.80	1	0	304	7	3/25	21.28	0	5	—	
4	Margaret Jennings†	1973	1978	12	221	57*	31.57	1	0	—	—	—	—	—	9	1	
5	Miriam Knee	1973	1973	6	86	30*	28.66	0	0	282	8	4/26	16.25	0	2	—	
6	Tina Macpherson	1973	1973	5	14	14	14.00	0	0	253	9	5/14	11.00	1	0	—	
7	Patsy May	1973	1976	9	16	6*	8.00	0	0	409	7	2/3	23.71	0	0	—	
8	Jackie Potter	1973	1973	6	167	57	83.50	2	0	—	—	—	—	—	1	—	
9	Dawn Rae	1973	1973	4	16	10	4.00	0	0	—	—	—	—	—	3	—	
10	Sharon Tredrea	1973	1988	31	528	69	27.78	4	0	1680	32	4/25	16.28	0	8	—	
11	Bev Wilson	1973	1973	6	130	50	26.00	1	0	—	—	—	—	—	2	—	
12	Raelee Thompson	1973	1985	23	207	50*	25.87	1	0	1368	24	3/16	18.66	0	6	—	
13	Lorraine Hill	1973	1978	8	143	106	23.83	0	1	237	5	4/11	16.80	0	2	—	
14	Wendy Weir	1973	1978	1	—	—	—	—	—	—	—	—	—	—	0	—	
15	Marie Cornish	1976	1982	16	147	55*	24.50	1	0	866	16	3/22	17.06	0	2	—	
16	Jan Lumsden	1976	1978	5	62	45	12.40	0	0	—	—	—	—	—	0	—	
17	Karen Price	1976	1986	16	39	16	4.33	0	0	903	21	3/12	18.90	0	5	—	
18	Julie Stockton	1976	1978	3	7	4	3.50	0	0	—	—	—	—	—	1	—	
19	Janette Tredrea	1976	1978	5	66	37*	16.50	0	0	—	—	—	—	—	2	—	
20	Wendy Hills	1976	1978	4	93	64	23.25	1	0	—	—	—	—	—	0	—	
21	Kerry Mortimer	1976	1976	1	4	4*	—	0	0	18	0	—	—	—	0	—	
22	Valerie Farrell	1978	1978	3	28	17	14.00	0	0	24	0	—	—	—	3	—	
23	Sharyn Hill	1978	1982	14	184	76	20.44	1	0	342	9	3/16	12.11	0	5	—	
24	Peta Verco	1978	1985	20	300	52	20.00	2	0	817	9	3/9	36.55	0	2	—	
25	Denise Emerson	1982	1987	21	820	84	41.00	8	0	—	—	—	—	—	2	—	
26	Lyn Fullston	1982	1988	41	134	27	16.75	0	0	2366	73	5/27	13.26	2	18	—	
27	Jen Jacobs	1982	1984	13	235	43	21.36	0	0	102	3	2/35	26.33	0	0	—	
28	Jill Kennare	1982	1987	19	789	122	46.41	3	2	—	—	—	—	—	2	—	
29	Denise Martin	1982	1987	17	17	5*	4.25	0	0	1086	27	3/8	13.92	0	4	—	
30	Terri Russell †	1982	1982	13	0	0	0.00	0	0	—	—	—	—	—	8	11	
31	Christine White	1982	1982	6	24	16*	24.00	0	0	318	2	2/19	52.00	0	1	—	
32	Lee Albon	1982	1982	4	38	17*	12.66	0	0	—	—	—	—	—	3	—	
33	Karen Read	1982	1986	20	336	56	21.00	1	0	—	—	—	—	—	5	—	
34	Trish Dawson	1984	1984	4	182	77*	91.00	2	0	—	—	—	—	—	2	—	
35	Annette Fellows	1984	1984	3	48	35*	24.00	0	0	—	—	—	—	—	1	—	
36	Christina Matthews †	1984	1995	47	141	22	9.40	0	0	—	—	—	—	—	35	14	
37	Wendy Piltz	1984	1984	3	0	0	0.00	0	0	180	0	—	—	—	1	—	
38	Lindsay Reeler	1984	1988	23	1034	143*	57.44	8	2	—	—	—	—	—	10	—	
39	Glenda Hall	1984	1986	2	0	0	0.00	0	0	36	0	—	—	—	1	—	
40	Lyn Larsen	1984	1994	49	426	62	20.28	2	0	1870	24	3/19	31.79	0	11	—	
41	Debbie Wilson	1985	1991	11	35	29*	17.50	0	0	656	7	2/24	44.71	0	1	—	
42	Wendy Napier	1985	1985	4	11	9	5.50	0	0	—	—	—	—	—	2	—	
43	Denise Annetts	1985	1993	43	1136	100*	41.70	8	1	—	—	—	—	—	23	—	
44	Karen Brown	1985	1993	43	230	38	12.77	0	0	2484	52	4/4	16.71	0	15	—	
45	Leonie Callaghan	1985	1985	1	—	—	—	—	—	60	1	1/13	13.00	0	0	—	
46	Judy Esmond †	1985	1985	3	2	2*	—	0	0	—	—	—	—	—	4	1	
47	Lee-Anne Hunter	1985	1996	24	267	47	16.68	0	0	778	15	3/19	15.40	0	3	—	
48	Sally Griffiths	1985	1995	32	309	34	18.17	0	0	831	17	3/17	20.05	0	6	—	
49	Belinda Haggett	1986	1993	37	913	80	30.43	6	0	228	3	1/13	33.66	0	9	—	
50	Sharlene Heywood	1986	1991	14	243	76	24.30	3	0	—	—	—	—	—	2	—	
51	Ruth Buckstein	1986	1988	16	511	105*	42.58	1	2	—	—	—	—	—	2	—	
52	Frances Leonard	1986	1986	1	2	2	2.00	0	0	48	0	—	—	—	0	—	
53	Zoe Goss	1987	2000	65	1099	96*	29.70	7	0	2773	64	4/10	19.15	0	11	—	
54	Rhonda Kendall	1987	1987	3	71	40	35.50	0	0	24	0	—	—	—	0	—	
55	Sally Moffat	1987	1992	15	13	7*	4.33	0	0	888	10	3/19	38.50	0	0	—	
56	Cathy Smith †	1987	1987	5	9	9	9.00	0	0	—	—	—	—	—	2	4	
57	Lynette Cook	1987	1987	2	0	0	0.00	0	0	60	0	—	—	—	0	—	
58	Jenny Owens	1987	1987	3	—	—	—	—	—	158	7	5/29	8.85	1	0	—	
59	Kerry Saunders	1988	1991	13	31	15*	7.75	0	0	516	9	2/17	21.77	0	2	—	
60	Jodie Davis	1988	1988	1	10	10	10.00	0	0	—	—	—	—	—	0	—	
61	Joanne Broadbent	1990	2000	60	993	85	28.37	6	0	1359	38	5/10	16.47	1	14	—	
62	Andrea McCauley	1990	1990	1	7	7	7.00	0	0	42	0	—	—	—	0	—	
63	Melissa Papworth	1990	1990	3	39	19	13.00	0	0	—	—	—	—	—	0	—	
64	Katherine Raymont	1990	1990	1	2	2	2.00	0	0	—	—	—	—	—	0	—	
65	Belinda Clark	1991	2005	118	4844	229*	47.49	30	5	90	3	1/7	17.00	0	45	—	
66	Bronwyn Calver	1991	1998	34	534	81*	53.40	3	0	1659	29	4/4	22.37	0	8	—	
67	Tunde Juhasz	1991	1992	5	38	21	12.66	0	0	—	—	—	—	—	4	—	
68	Kim Fazackerley	1992	1996	9	14	8*	7.00	0	0	436	9	3/18	19.33	0	0	—	
69	Sharyn Bow	1993	1994	11	14	5	4.66	0	0	561	19	4/21	13.94	0	4	—	
70	Julie Calvert	1993	1994	6	96	34	24.00	0	0	—	—	—	—	—	0	—	
71	Cathryn Fitzpatrick	1993	2007	109	651	43	16.69	0	0	6017	180	5/14	16.79	4	25	—	
72	Kim Bradley	1994	1994	2	0	0*	—	0	0	120	1	1/24	38.00	0	0	—	
73	Caroline Ward	1994	1994	1	8	8	8.00	0	0	—	—	—	—	—	1	—	
74	Jo Garey	1995	1996	6	9	7	3.00	0	0	306	9	2/12	15.11	0	2	—	
75	Lisa Keightley †	1995	2005	82	2630	156*	39.84	21	4	150	8	4/19	10.87	0	27	2	
76	Olivia Magno	1995	2001	44	258	38	15.17	0	0	2005	51	4/10	18.47	0	29	—	
77	Karen Rolton	1995	2009	141	4814	154*	48.14	33	8	3267	85	4/29	20.81	0	25	—	
78	Stephanie Theodore	1995	1995	1	5	5	5.00	0	0	—	—	—	—	—	1	—	
79	Julia Price †	1996	2005	84	365	38	15.86	0	0	6	0	—	—	—	70	30	
80	Cherie Bambury	1997	2000	15	227	66	22.70	2	0	18	0	—	—	—	6	—	
81	Avril Fahey	1997	2001	40	28	12*	9.33	0	0	1623	37	3/11	21.94	0	5	—	
82	Mel Jones	1997	2005	61	1028	58	21.41	4	0	12	0	—	—	—	15	—	
83	Charmaine Mason	1997	2001	46	66	11*	6.00	0	0	2366	83	5/9	13.85	2	16	—	
84	Jodi Dannatt	1997	1999	10	61	43	15.25	0	0	462	11	3/5	18.36	0	2	—	
85	Michelle Goszko	1997	2006	34	669	51*	25.73	1	0	36	1	1/3	15.00	0	13	—	
86	Jane Franklin	1998	1998	4	39	36	19.50	0	0	102	1	1/8	26.00	0	1	—	
87	Martha Winch	1999	2000	7	122	54	24.40	1	0	24	1	1/11	11.00	0	2	—	
88	Megan White	1999	1999	1	—	—	—	—	—	30	0	—	—	—	0	—	
89	Terry McGregor	1999	2002	26	157	28*	52.33	0	0	1344	36	4/8	17.52	0	8	—	
90	Clea Smith	2000	2011	48	85	27*	14.16	0	0	2198	45	4/32	25.68	0	9	—	
91	Julie Hayes	2000	2006	59	241	44	14.17	0	0	3161	65	4/31	24.23	0	12	—	
92	Louise Broadfoot	2000	2005	10	52	21	10.40	0	0	168	4	1/4	19.25	0	1	—	
93	Lisa Sthalekar	2001	2013	125	2728	104*	30.65	16	2	5964	146	5/35	24.97	1	49	—	
94	Sally Cooper	2001	2002	7	106	85	21.20	1	0	—	—	—	—	—	0	—	
95	Emma Liddell	2002	2005	33	3	2*	1.50	0	0	1595	32	4/17	29.40	0	1	—	
96	Kris Britt	2003	2008	17	103	34*	9.36	0	0	372	11	4/16	24.54	0	11	—	
97	Alex Blackwell	2003	2017	144	3492	114	36.00	25	3	132	6	2/8	10.50	0	55	—	
98	Melissa Bulow	2003	2007	19	499	85	26.26	6	0	—	—	—	—	—	7	—	
99	Leonie Coleman †	2004	2009	24	119	44	14.87	0	0	—	—	—	—	—	15	8	
100	Shannon Cunneen	2004	2004	4	49	39	16.33	0	0	—	—	—	—	—	1	—	
101	Shelley Nitschke	2004	2011	80	2047	113*	34.11	14	1	3632	98	7/24	22.14	1	31	—	
102	Kate Blackwell	2004	2008	41	475	57*	19.00	2	0	18	0	—	—	—	12	—	
103	Kirsten Pike	2005	2008	26	50	17	8.33	0	0	1291	34	4/23	23.97	0	8	—	
104	Sarah Elliott	2005	2010	22	416	96	32.00	4	0	78	2	2/14	28.00	0	9	—	
105	Jodie Fields †	2006	2013	67	1162	64*	28.34	5	0	—	—	—	—	—	57	19	
106	Sarah Andrews	2006	2010	39	102	21*	10.20	0	0	1666	54	4/50	21.14	0	10	—	
107	Leah Poulton	2006	2012	48	1033	104*	25.19	4	2	144	3	2/9	32.66	0	12	—	
108	Emma Sampson	2007	2009	30	27	9*	9.00	0	0	1500	39	5/30	24.02	1	8	—	
109	Ellyse Perry	2007	2026	168	4581	112*	48.22	37	3	5806	166	7/22	25.56	3	56	—	
110	Rene Farrell	2007	2017	44	182	39*	18.20	0	0	1869	42	3/17	30.78	0	9	—	
111	Delissa Kimmince	2008	2020	16	79	42	79.00	0	0	640	14	5/26	29.42	1	8	—	
112	Lauren Ebsary	2008	2010	19	402	86	28.71	2	0	126	3	1/13	28.33	0	6	—	
113	Jess Cameron	2009	2015	50	1265	90*	37.20	9	0	18	1	1/16	16.00	0	32	—	
114	Erin Osborne	2009	2016	60	359	47*	22.43	0	0	2594	68	3/9	25.57	0	18	—	
115	Rachael Haynes	2009	2022	77	2585	130	39.76	19	2	108	7	3/10	13.42	0	25	—	
116	Alyssa Healy ‡†	2010	2026	126	3777	170	37.02	19	8	12	0	—	—	—	85	38	
117	Julie Hunter	2010	2014	24	22	16*	22.00	0	0	973	24	3/31	24.87	0	5	—	
118	Sarah Coyte	2011	2016	30	286	51*	22.00	1	0	1418	44	4/39	22.27	0	4	—	
119	Meg Lanning	2011	2023	103	4602	152*	53.51	21	15	132	1	1/30	114.00	0	53	—	
120	Sharon Millanta	2011	2012	6	21	15*	21.00	0	0	293	4	1/40	72.50	0	0	—	
121	Annie Maloney	2011	2011	1	—	—	—	—	—	36	0	—	—	—	0	—	
122	Jess Jonassen	2012	2023	93	610	39	19.06	0	0	4161	141	5/27	19.60	2	28	—	
123	Megan Schutt	2012	2026	111	111	18	6.16	0	0	4988	148	5/19	24.15	1	23	—	
124	Renee Chappell	2013	2013	2	8	5	4.00	0	0	24	0	—	—	—	0	—	
125	Holly Ferling	2013	2016	22	9	4	3.00	0	0	721	24	3/4	22.00	0	9	—	
126	Elyse Villani	2014	2019	34	603	75	21.53	3	0	252	7	3/42	35.71	0	16	—	
127	Nicole Bolton	2014	2019	50	1896	124	41.21	12	4	30	2	2/18	18.00	0	14	—	
128	Kristen Beams	2014	2017	30	34	11*	6.80	0	0	1490	42	4/15	22.45	0	10	—	
129	Grace Harris	2016	2025	12	16	7*	2.66	0	0	402	12	3/31	20.33	0	7	—	
130	Beth Mooney †	2016	2026	97	3275	138	50.38	21	6	—	—	—	—	—	54	2	
131	Tahlia McGrath	2016	2026	61	882	74	25.94	5	0	1172	32	3/4	31.96	0	22	—	
132	Amanda-Jade Wellington	2016	2022	14	17	11	2.83	0	0	672	18	3/24	29.77	0	3	—	
133	Lauren Cheatle	2017	2019	4	13	7	13.00	0	0	144	2	1/42	71.00	0	1	—	
134	Ashleigh Gardner	2017	2026	93	1699	115	32.05	8	3	3883	124	5/30	22.43	1	46	—	
135	Belinda Vakarewa	2017	2017	1	—	—	—	—	—	24	0	—	—	—	1	—	
136	Sarah Aley	2017	2017	1	15	15*	—	0	0	60	2	2/29	14.50	0	1	—	
137	Nicola Carey	2018	2026	28	266	49	38.00	0	0	929	21	3/19	31.85	0	9	—	
138	Sophie Molineux‡	2018	2026	19	143	47	14.30	0	0	842	32	4/14	17.00	0	13	—	
139	Georgia Wareham	2018	2026	52	342	42	26.30	0	0	1973	55	3/23	25.96	0	19	—	
140	Tayla Vlaeminck	2018	2021	8	—	—	—	—	—	306	7	2/14	28.71	0	3	—	
141	Erin Burns	2019	2019	1	—	—	—	—	—	24	0	—	—	—	0	—	
142	Heather Graham	2019	2019	1	4	4*	—	0	0	48	1	1/29	29.00	0	0	—	
143	Annabel Sutherland	2020	2026	52	1062	110	40.84	4	3	1755	63	5/40	21.77	1	34	—	
144	Darcie Brown	2021	2026	30	19	14*	19.00	0	0	1104	29	4/33	31.89	0	9	—	
145	Hannah Darlington	2021	2021	2	–	—	—	—	—	72	2	2/29	32.50	0	0	—	
146	Stella Campbell	2021	2021	1	0	0*	—	0	0	54	1	1/41	41.00	0	0	—	
147	Alana King	2022	2026	53	295	51*	18.43	1	0	2240	85	7/18	18.81	3	15	—	
148	Phoebe Litchfield	2023	2026	42	1604	119	44.55	11	3	—	—	—	—	—	27	—	
149	Kim Garth	2023	2026	32	176	42*	19.55	0	0	1341	45	3/8	20.64	0	12	—	
150	Georgia Voll	2024	2026	13	549	101	49.90	2	2	—	—	—	—	—	13	—	
151	Lucy Hamilton	2026	2026	2	—	—	—	—	—	78	1	1/22	68.00	0	1	—	
152	Tahlia Wilson†	2026	2026	1	7	7*	—	0	0	—	—	—	—	—	1	1	

=== Notes ===
- Valerie Farrell played two One Day Internationals for the International XI women's cricket team before playing for Australia.
- Rhonda Kendall played twelve One Day Internationals for the International XI women's cricket team before playing for Australia.
- Jenny Owens played twelve One Day Internationals for the International XI women's cricket team before playing for Australia.
- Kim Garth played thirty-three One Day Internationals for the Ireland women's cricket team before playing for Australia.

== See also ==
- List of Australia women Test cricketers
- List of Australia women Twenty20 International cricketers
- List of Australia national cricket captains
