= Caroline Ward =

Australian cricketer (born 1969)

Personal information
- Full name: Caroline M Ward
- Born: 30 September 1969 (age 57); Adelaide, South Australia
- Batting: Right-handed
- Bowling: Right-arm medium

International information
- National side: Australia
- Only Test (cap 129): 28 February 1995 v New Zealand
- Only ODI (cap 73): 20 January 1994 v New Zealand

Career statistics
Competition	Test	ODI	FC	LA
Matches	1	1	8	43
Runs scored	25	8	170	743
Batting average	24.00	8.00	24.28	20.08
100s/50s	0/0	0/0	0/1	0/3
Top score	24*	8	56	82
Catches/stumpings	0/–	1/–	2/–	19/–
- Source: CricInfo, 30 May 2014

Caroline M Ward (born 30 September 1969) is an Australian former cricket player.

She played domestic cricket for the South Australian Women's cricket team between 1990 and 2002. Ward played one Test and one One Day International for the Australia national women's cricket team.

As of May 2014 Ward shares the record of four catches taken in a Women's National Cricket League match with Jude Coleman and Belinda Clark.
