= Shelley Nitschke =

Australian cricket player (born 1976)

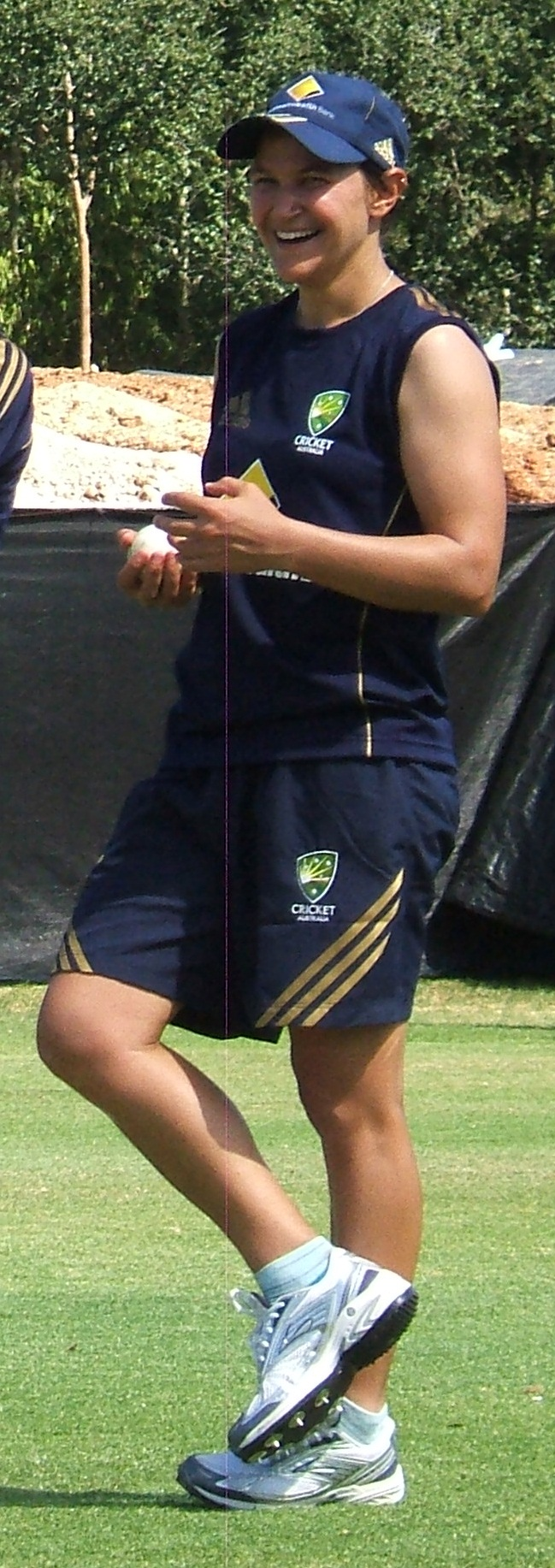

Personal information
- Born: 3 December 1976 (age 49); Adelaide, South Australia
- Batting: Left-handed
- Bowling: Slow left-arm orthodox

International information
- National side: Australia
- Test debut (cap 146): 9 May 2005 v England
- Last Test: 15 February 2008 v England
- ODI debut (cap 101): 11 December 2004 v India
- Last ODI: 21 March 2009 v India

Domestic team information
- Years: Team
- 2000/01–2011/12: South Australia
- 2015/16–2016/17: Adelaide Strikers

Career statistics
| Competition | Test | ODI | T20I | LA |
|---|---|---|---|---|
| Matches | 6 | 80 | 36 | 170 |
| Runs scored | 295 | 2,047 | 776 | 4,392 |
| Batting average | 32.77 | 34.11 | 23.51 | 31.37 |
| 100s/50s | 0/2 | 1/14 | 0/3 | 3/29 |
| Top score | 88* | 113* | 56 | 119* |
| Balls bowled | 1180 | 3,632 | 768 | 7,240 |
| Wickets | 12 | 98 | 43 | 172 |
| Bowling average | 27.91 | 22.14 | 16.39 | 25.11 |
| 5 wickets in innings | 0 | 1 | 0 | 1 |
| 10 wickets in match | 0 | 0 | 0 | 0 |
| Best bowling | 3/59 | 7/24 | 4/21 | 7/24 |
| Catches/stumpings | 0/– | 31/– | 6/– | 58/– |
- Source: Cricinfo, 7 August 2025

Shelley Nitschke (born 3 December 1976) is an Australian former cricketer who played for South Australia and Australia. A left-handed batter and left arm orthodox spinner, she was one of the leading all-rounders in the world until her retirement in 2011. In May 2022 Nitschke became the interim head coach of the Australian women's team and was appointed full-time on a four-year contract in September 2022.

Nitschke made her senior debut in the Women's National Cricket League (WNCL) for South Australia at the relatively old age of 24 in 2000–01. She started her career as a specialist batter and had little effect in her first two seasons, scoring 191 runs at 12.73. Having only taken one wicket to this point, she began bowling regularly and took 13 at 25.38 over the next two seasons and scored 326 runs at 27.16.

During the 2004–05 WNCL season, Nitschke scored 144 runs at 36.00 and took ten wickets at 17.50 and was rewarded with selection in the Australian team for a One Day International (ODI) series in India. She did not have a successful initiation to international cricket and was in and out of the team, ending her debut series with 10 runs and a total of 1/99. Playing as a specialist bowler and batting in the lower-order, Nitschke was retained for the 2005 World Cup in South Africa. After being overlooked for the first two matches, she played in the remaining matches and took 11 wickets at 8.27 to establish herself as an international bowler. She claimed 2/14 in the final as Australia defeated India to win the World Cup without defeat. She only batted once because Australia's strong line-up was rarely threatened, scoring one run.

Nitschke made her Test debut in the subsequent tour of England, and showed her batting ability at international level, scoring 81 and 88 in the two Tests. She then took a record 7/24 in an ODI at Kidderminster. She returned home for the 2005–06 WNCL, scoring 287 runs and taking nine wickets and was retained for the home series against India and New Zealand, again used in the lower order. At the end of the 2006–07 season, the Australians played in a quadrangular tournament in Chennai and Nitschke batted in the upper-order for the first time, making 200 runs at 28.57 and top-scoring with 81, hermaiden ODI half-century, as Australia defeated New Zealand in the final. Since then, Nitschke has batted in the upper-order. During the 2007–08 season, Nitschke made three ODI half-centuries. At the start of the 2008–09 season, Nitschke struck 94 in a seven-wicket win over India, a new highest ODI score.

During the 2009 World Cup, Nitschke made 275 runs at 39.28 and took seven wickets at 28.14 at an economy rate of 3.45. Her best performance was an 87 and 3/43 in a group match against South Africa as Australia eventually came fourth after losing the third-place playoff to India.

In the inaugural Women's World Twenty20 in England in 2009, Nitschke made 130 runs at 32.50 and took five wickets at 17.80 at an economy rate of 5.56 as Australia were eliminated in the semi-finals by the hosts.

Having ended in the nineties on three previous occasions in the WNCL, Nitschke broke through for her maiden century, making two for the season and ending the competition with 486 runs. In the subsequent Rose Bowl series, she made her maiden international century, 113 not out in Invercargill, ending the eight ODIs with 343 runs at 57.16 and 12 wickets at 13.25.

Nitschke won the Belinda Clark Award in 2009, 2010, 2011 and 2012.

In the South Australian Cricket Association Women's Grade competition Nitschke played for Sturt District Cricket Club.

In July 2011, she announced her retirement from international cricket.

== Domestic debut ==
Nitschke made her debut for South Australia at the relatively old age of 24, playing in all of her state's eight matches in the 2000–01 Women's National Cricket League (WNCL). In her debut match against reigning champions New South Wales, Nitschke made a solitary run before being run out as South Australia lost by seven wickets. At this stage of her career, Nitschke was effectively a specialist batter, and she took her only wicket of the season on the following day, taking 1/9 from three overs—the only time she bowled during the season—and scoring five as New South Wales won again. Nitschke did not pass 15 until the sixth match of the season, scoring 43 to help guide South Australia to a six-wicket win over Queensland. She ended the season with 79 runs at 9.87.

The following season, Nitschke did not bowl at all, and scored 112 runs at 16.00 with a top-score of 27 against Western Australia. South Australia won four of their eight matches and did not reach the final. In 2002–03, Nitschke began bowling on a regular basis and her batting also improved. In the second match of the season, she took 3/18 to help secure a ten-run win over the defending champions New South Wales, and later made an unbeaten 92 in a 132-run win over Western Australia, more than doubling her previous best score in the WNCL. She took 2/18 from ten overs in the final match of the season against Victoria, helping to secure a 38-run win. South Australia won five of their eight matches and did not make the final, but Nitschke scored 190 runs at 27.14 and took seven wickets at 16.57 with an economy rate of 2.57. In 2003–04, Nitschke made 136 runs at 27.20 and took six wickets at 35.66 at an economy rate of 3.24 in a consistent but unspectatular WNCL season; her two best scores of 36 and 35, both unbeaten, came in two wins against Western Australia, and she never took more than one wicket per match. South Australia won four of seven completed matches and did not reach the final.

== International debut ==
In her first three WNCL matches in 2004–05, Nitschke scored 25 not out, 55 and 19, and took a total of 1/81 from 25 overs. This was enough to gain her selection for Australia for the first time, for a seven-match One Day International (ODI) tour to India. Nitschke was used as a specialist bowler on the dry, spin-friendly pitches of India, batting in the tail. She made her debut in the first match of the series in Mysore, taking 0/19 from six overs in a 14-run win; she was not required to bat despite the loss of six wickets. In the second game, she took her maiden international wicket, ending with 1/24 from four overs in a three-wicket win, scoring an unbeaten one from six balls as Australia reached their target with four balls remaining. In the third match in Mumbai, Nitschke made a duck and was hit for 13 runs in her first two overs and removed from the attack as the hosts won by six wickets, and was dropped for the next match. She was recalled after one match on the sidelines but then hit for 17 runs in two overs in the fifth ODI and dropped again, before taking 0/26 from seven overs in the final match and scoring 8 from 27 balls, trying to hold up the tail as Australia were dismissed for 77 and suffered an 88-run defeat. Nitschke's debut ODI series was not a success; she ended with 10 runs at 5.00 with a strike rate of 24.39 and a solitary wicket at 99.00 at an economy rate of 4.71, a high figure for women's cricket.

After the difficult initiation to international cricket, Nitschke returned to Australia for the resumption of the WNCL. She took 4/37 and 2/13 in her first two matches back, helping South Australia to successive victories over Western Australia. She followed this with 33 and 3/19 against Victoria, but was not able to prevent a 12-run defeat. Nitschke ended the season with 144 runs at 36.00 and 10 wickets at 17.50 at an economy rate of 3.43.

The late-season form was enough for Nitschke to be retained for the Rose Bowl series against New Zealand held in Western Australia before the Australians departed to South Africa for the 2005 World Cup. Nitschke played in only the third and final ODI against New Zealand, taking 1/16 from her nine overs as the hosts took victory.

== 2005 World Cup win and ODI regular ==
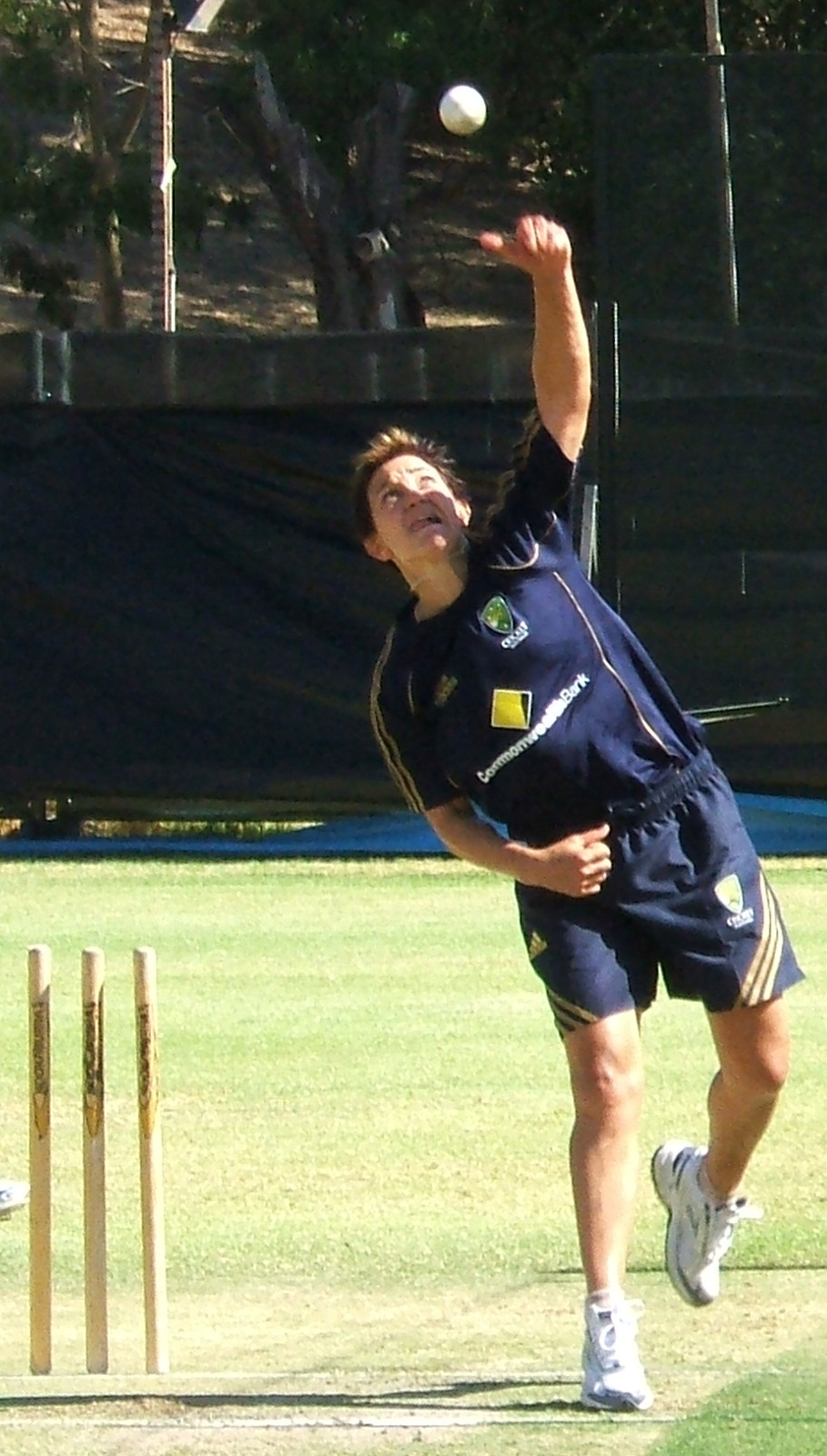
Nitschke bowling in the nets

After arriving in South Africa, Nitschke was left on the sidelines for the first two round-robin matches against England and New Zealand. She was called into the third match against the West Indies. After scoring one run from her only delivery in the lower-order before being run out in the death overs in pursuit of quick runs, she took 1/15 from eight overs and claimed a catch in a 79-run win. Australia's batting line-up was not threatened and Nitschke was not required to bat in the remaining five matches. She took 2/32 and a catch in a 97-run win over the hosts, and then took 3/5 from six overs and took one catch as Australia dismissed Sri Lanka for 57 and won by eight wickets. In the next match she took 1/3 from six overs, conceding one single each in three of the overs as Ireland managed only 8/66 before Australia completed a ten-wicket victory. The final pool match against India was abandoned without a ball being bowled due to inclement weather, and Australia met England in the semi-finals, where Nitschke took 2/22 from seven overs before Australia overhauled the target of 159 with five wickets in hand. In the final, she took 2/14 from nine overs as Australia bowled India out for 117 to win by 98 runs. Nitschke ended the tournament with 11 wickets at 8.27 and an economy rate of 2.06, establishing herself as a bowler at international level.

== Test debut ==
In the northern hemisphere summer of 2005, Australia toured England and Nitschke established her batting at international level on this campaign. Australia started with a stopover in Ireland, and only the second of the three ODIs was not washed out entirely. Nitschke took 4/15 in a 240-run win. Australia played two Tests in England and Nitschke made her debut in the First Test at County Ground in Hove, Sussex. She became the 146th woman to play Test cricket for Australia. Nitschke was listed to bat at No. 10 as the visitors won the toss and batted first. However, she was soon in action as Australia collapsed to be 8/191 on the first day. Joining fellow bowler Julie Hayes at the crease, Nitschke helped take the score to 236 before her partner was out for 57. Last batter Clea Smith came in and helped Nitschke to add 92 before Australia reached stumps at 9/328 with Nitschke on 70 not out. The next morning, they added a further 27 before Smith was out for 42, ending a rapid final-wicket partnership of 119 from only 101 minutes. The last two wickets put on 164 runs in 159 minutes and Nitschke ended on 81 not out with 13 fours and a six, the top-score of the innings, from 144 balls. After reaching her half-century in 111 balls, Nitschke accelerated, scoring 31 from her last 34 balls, 24 of which came in boundaries.

Nitshcke then took 3/59 from 30 overs as Australia made 355 and took an 82-run lead. She bowled top-scorer Charlotte Edwards for 69 to take her maiden Test wicket and then removed Jenny Gunn and Katherine Brunt at the end of the innings. Batting at No. 11, Nitschke made five in the second innings as Australia were all out for 223 to leave the hosts a target of 306. She hit a four in a one-minute stay at the crease, before being stumped while trying to get quick runs, ending with five from four runs. Nitschke was unable to take a wicket in the second innings, taking 0/40 from 22 overs as the hosts hung on for a draw with three wickets in hand. In the Second Test at New Road, Worcester, Nitschke was promoted to No. 9 but struggled. Coming in at 7/113, she batted 43 minutes but scored only one run from 46 balls as Australia were out for 131. and took 1/30, removing Arran Brindle as England took a 158-run first innings lead. Australia was facing an innings win when they fell to be 4/18 and 7/67 when Nitschke came in to join Kate Blackwell during the third day. The pair saw Australia to 7/179 by the end of the third and penultimate day with Nitschke unbeaten on 60. However, Australia's chances of saving the match was struck a blow at the start of the final day when Blackwell was out for 72 without further addition to the score and Julia Price was out for a first-ball duck. Nitschke and Emma Liddell then put on 53 to take the score to 232 before Liddell was out for 24. Nitschke top-scored with 88 not out from 231 balls from a long innings of four and a half hours. She had hit 16 fours and a six. However, this was not enough as England reached their target of 75 with six wickets in hand. Nitschke's bowling was not used in the second innings. Nitschke ended the series with 175 runs at 87.50 and 4 wickets at 32.25.

Despite her performances with the bat in the Tests, Nitschke was left in the lower-order in the ODIs, batting at Nos. 8 and 9. She played in the first four ODIs, scoring 4, 2 not out and 0 not out. Nitschke also had an uneven run with the ball. After conceding 33 runs from six wicketless overs in a 12-run win in the first ODI, she took unprecedented figures of 7/24 from 7.4 overs in Kidderminster, playing the main role in a 65-run win. She took 1/34 from ten overs in the third ODI and was taken off in the fourth match after conceding 20 runs from three overs. Nitschke ended the series with eight wickets at 13.87 and an economy rate of 4.16.

In the opening match of the 2005–06 WNCL, Nitschke struck 92 to help set up a five-wicket win over Queensland. In the third match, against Victoria, she took 4/11 and then scored 33 as South Australia scraped home to a one-wicket victory over Victoria. However, she failed to make an impact in the two matches against the reigning champions New South Wales, making 12 and 1 and failing to take a wicket as South Australia lost both matches. In the penultimate match of the season, she made an unbeaten 60 in a nine-wicket win over Western Australia. She then took 2/25 from ten overs and scored 30 to help secure a three-wicket win. South Australia won four of their eight matches and failed to reach the finals series, but Nitschke was productive, scoring 287 runs at 41.00 and taking nine wickets at 32.44 at an economy rate of 4.42.

The Australian season ended with a home series against India in Adelaide. In the one-off Test, Nitschke—now promoted to No. 7—came in at 5/130 and made 18 from 27 balls before falling at 6/159, before Australia was out for 250. She then took 2/9 from eight overs, removing Devika Palshikar and Amita Sharma, as the hosts took a 157-run first innings lead and then enforced the follow on. She then took 1/29 from 26 overs, including 15 maidens, again dismissing Sharma, to help dismiss the tourists for 153 and seal victory by an innings and four runs. Nitschke played in all three matches as Australia swept the ODIs. She had a small workload, making six runs in her only innings and totalling 0/30 from 12 overs. In her only innings, she was given an opportunity to bat in the middle-order for the first time for Australia, but she made only six from 22 balls before being bowled.

The following 2006–07 season started with the Rose Bowl series against New Zealand, which the Australians hosted at Allan Border Field in Brisbane. The five ODIs were preceded by a T20 match, a tie in which Nitschke did not play. She again started in the lower-order after failing to capitalise on her previous opportunity against India, but gradually worked her way up the order from No. 10 to No. 5 by the end of the series.

She made 87 runs at 43.50 in five innings as Australia took a clean sweep of the ODIs. In the second match, Nitschke took 1/6 from eight overs and then made 31 from 36 balls as Australia reached their target of 176 with one wicket to spare, having been six not out from 14 balls in a one-run win in the opening match. In the fourth ODI, having been elevated to No. 7, Nitschke made 20 not out from 19 balls at the death and took 3/32 in an 85-run win, and she ended the series with 2/36 and three catches in a four-wicket win. In this match, she was promoted to No. 5, but she made only 16 runs from 23 balls before being caught. Nitschke ended with seven wickets at 18.28 and an economy rate of 3.04.

Nitschke started the 2006–07 WNCL with 93 and 1/38, setting up a 12-run win over Western Australia. In the final match of her campaign, she took 3/24 and scored 34 in a seven-wicket win over Queensland. She missed the last two matches against New South Wales and South Australia did not make the finals. She ended with 155 runs at 31.00 and took six wickets at 30.66 with an economy rate of 3.14 from five matches.

After the end of the Australian season, Nitschke was selected for a four-nations ODI tournament in Chennai, India. In addition to the hosts and Australia, New Zealand and England were also participating, and each team played each other twice in round-robin phase. In the first match, Nitschke made 33 as Australia amassed 9/260 but her bowling was attacked by New Zealand, who took 35 runs with the loss of only one wicket from her seven overs en route to a six-wicket win. Nitschke made 17 as Australia reached 8/213 against the hosts, but managed only 1/46 from her ten overs as they reached the target with three wickets in hand. Australia won the next four matches to reach the final, but Nitschke continued to make starts without capitalising, registering scores of 21, 14, 21 and 13. She took 2/27 from seven in the second of the matches against New Zealand, but was then attacked by the English batters, ending with 2/74 from ten overs.

In the final against New Zealand, Nitschke took 0/39 from nine overs. Again pushed up to open, she top-scored with 81 from as many balls, hitting 12 fours and a six to help set up a six-wicket win to take the competition. She has played as an opener since then.

Nitschke ended the series with 200 runs at 28.57. Her bowling was neither penetrative nor economical; she took seven wickets at 41.85 at an economy rate of 4.88.

Australia hosted the Rose Bowl series held in tropical Darwin in July 2007, the middle of the southern hemisphere winter. Nitschke played in all five ODIs. In the first match, she took 2/29 from her ten overs and scored 27 in a seven-wicket win. She then took 3/34 in the third match, which Australia won by six wickets. Nitschke made 47 in the final match but it was not enough to prevent a four-wicket defeat. She ended the series with 112 runs at 22.40 and took eight wickets at 21.12 at an economy rate of 3.52. In the T20 match that preceded the series, she took 1/13 from two overs and was out for 12 as Australia scraped home by one run.

Nitschke started the 2007–08 WNCL season by taking two wickets and being run out in each of the two matches against New South Wales. She then went wicketless in both matches against Queensland while conceding 2.64 runs per over. Up to this point Nitschke had made only 71 runs and South Australia had only won one of their four matches. In the next match, Nitschke took 2/17 from six overs and top-scored with 61 in a seven-wicket win over Western Australia. In the penultimate round-robin match, she hit 74 and took 2/31 in a 140-run win over Victoria. Although South Australia succumbed to the same team the next day, they had won four of their eight matches, and this was enough to qualify them in second place for the final against New South Wales. However, inclement weather washed out the final entirely and New South Wales were awarded the WNCL for placing first in the round-robin phase. Nitschke ended the series with 250 runs at 31.25 and took ten wickets at 25.20 at an economy rate of 3.64. In two T20 matches for her state, Nitschke made 24 runs at 12.00 and totalled 2/34 from six overs.

The domestic competition was followed by two international series against England and New Zealand. Nitschke made 14 and took 1/23 from four overs as Australia won the T20 international against England at the Melbourne Cricket Ground. In the ODIs that followed, drawn 2–2, Nitschke scored 140 runs at 35.00 and took four wickets at 28.25 at an economy rate of 3.53. In the first match, she took 2/38 from ten overs and made 24 in a 56-run loss. With the series levelled at 1–1 she made 54 in a seven-wicket loss in the third match, before making 50 in a 41-run in the final match. In the one-off Test at Bowral, Nitschke batted at No. 5 and scored four as Australia fell to 5/59 before ending on 154 all out. She then took 2/27 from 24.4 overs, removing Lydia Greenway and Isa Guha as England ended on 244 all out with a 90-run lead. She contributed 36 of the hosts' second innings of 9/231 declared. After coming in at 3/34 with Australia still 56 runs in arrears, Nitschke consolidated the innings with Sthalekar, compiling a partnership of 107 runs in 43.2 overs. Nitschke was eventually out after a 122-ball, 159-minute stay at the crease. She took 1/24 in the second innings, trapping Greenway for 26 as the tourists reached their target of 142 with six wickets in hand.

The Australians then headed to Bert Sutcliffe Oval in Lincoln, New Zealand, for a T20 international and five ODIs. Nitschke made a duck and took 2/17 from four overs as the hosts won the T20 by four wickets. She then made 38 of 5/189 and conceded only 12 runs from her six overs in the first ODI to help secure a 63-run win, before making 25 and a duck, both run out as the hosts claimed both matches to take the series lead. Nitschke took 2/45 in the third match but was expensive, conceding 5.62 runs per over. Australia thus needed to win the remaining two matches. In the fourth match, Nitschke made 17 and took 0/20 from an economical quota of ten overs in a six-run Australian win. In the final match, she took 0/23 from 10 wicketless overs. She then made 82 to help steer Australia to their target of 250 and a series-clinching eight-wicket win. Nitschke ended the series with 162 runs at 32.40 and three wickets at 46.00 at an economy rate of 3.13.

The 2008–09 Australian season started with a tour by India. Nitschke started well in two warm-up matches against the Australian Under-21 team, making 57 and 56 and totalling 2/63 from 13 overs. The opposition could not dismiss here; she retired in the first match to give other batsmen an opportunity and retired hurt in the next match.

Nitschke missed the first four matches due to injury. Returning for the final match at Manuka Oval in Canberra, she took 2/16 from her ten overs, and then top-scored with 94 as Australia made 3/178 to win by seven wickets and complete a 5–0 whitewash.

By her standards, Nitschke's performances in the 2008–09 WNCL were mediocre. In eight matches, she scored 181 runs at 22.62 and took five wickets at 51.20 with an economy rate of 3.71. In the third match of the season, she took 2/30 from ten overs and made 41 in a 45-run defeat to Victoria. This was the only time that she took more than one wicket in a match. In the sixth match against New South Wales, she made her top-score for the series, 62. South Australia won by 39 runs despite Nitschke being hit for 42 runs from seven wicketless overs, part of a run of three wicketless matches. South Australia did not make the final. In two T20 matches, she made 6 and 0 and took a total of 2/49 from six overs.

== 2009 World Cup and World Twenty20 ==
After the WNCL ended, the Australians headed to New Zealand for the Rose Bowl series ahead of the World Cup. Nitschke took one wicket and made single-digit scores in each of the first two matches as Australia went 2–0 down. Australia needed to win the remaining three matches to win the series, and Nitschke made 73 and took 1/20 from seven overs in a 104-run win in the third ODI. She then made 58 and took 1/51 from nine overs to help square the series 2–2. The last match was washed out and Nitschke ended with 144 runs at 36.00 and four wickets at 29.75 at an economy rate of 4.10. The teams returned to Australia for the one-off T20 match, and Nitschke took 3/16 from three overs and then scored 54 not out as Australia won under the Duckworth–Lewis method. In a warm-up matches against England ahead of the World Cup in New South Wales and Canberra, Nitschke made six and took 2/31 from eight overs.

In the opening match of the World Cup campaign, Nitschke was attacked and took 0/37 from her six overs as New Zealand made 205 all out. She then made 27 as Australia fell short of their target on the Duckworth–Lewis method. Australia then needed to win their two remaining group matches to reach the Super Six phase. Nitschke made 87 and took 3/43 from ten overs as Australia defeated South Africa by 61 runs. She then scored 45 and took 0/25 from six overs in a 47-run win over the West Indies. In the first Super Six match, Nitschke was economical, taking 1/19 from six overs against India. She then made 17 as Australia made 7/218, falling 17 runs of their target. She then scored 56 and took 1/29 from ten overs in a win over Pakistan by 107 runs. She returned for Australia's final Super Six match against England, and although the hosts won, it was not enough for them to place in the top two in the standings and qualify for the final. Nitschke took 2/14 from ten overs and made 37 as Australia reached the target of 162 with eight wickets in hand. In the third-place playoff against India, she made 6 of Australia's 142, and then took 0/30 from her nine overs in a three-wicket defeat.

Nitschke ended the tournament with 275 runs at 39.28 and took seven wickets at 28.14 at an economy rate of 3.45.

Nitschke was selected for Australia's team for the inaugural Women's World Twenty20 held in England in 2009. The Australians hosted New Zealand for a three-match series in tropical Darwin at the beginning of June before the World Cup, and Nitschke played in the first two matches, making 1 and 25 and taking 1/27 and 1/14, both from four overs. Arriving in the northern hemisphere she made 16 and was hit for 18 runs from two overs in the team's only warm-up on English soil, a five-run win against the hosts.

After making 18 in Australia's 8/123, she conceded 23 runs from her four overs as New Zealand claimed a nine-wicket win in the first match. She then took 1/23 in four overs against the West Indies before sealing an eight-wicket win by top-scoring with 56. Nitschke then made 16 and took 4/21 from four overs as Australia defeated South Africa by 24 runs. This put Australia into the semi-final against England.

Nitschke made 37 of Australia's 5/163, and was economical in taking 0/22 from four overs, but most of her colleagues were attacked by the local batters, who overhauled Australia's score to reach the final, which they won. Nitschke ended the tournament with 130 runs at 32.50 and five wickets at 17.80 at an economy rate of 5.56.

Nitschke and the Australians stayed in England for a bilateral series against the hosts, who were the reigning world champions in both ODIs and T20s, after the end of the World Twenty20. She scored 32 and took 1/21 from four overs as Australia upset the hosts in the only T20 match. In the first ODI, Nitschke made a duck and conceded 23 runs from five overs in a nine-wicket loss. She was then attacked and hit for 58 runs from seven wicketless overs in the next match. Despite making 47 herself, Australia fell to a 55-run defeat. Nitschke made another duck in the third ODI, before claiming 2/29, her first wickets of the series, but this was not enough to prevent a two-wicket defeat. She then made 71 and took 2/34 in the fourth match, but England again won by two wickets. Nitschke ended the ODIs with 21 in the final match, which was abandoned due to rain soon after the start of the hosts' chase. Nitschke ended the series with 139 runs at 27.80 and four wickets at 36.00. Her economy rate of 5.76 was far higher than her career norm.

Nitschke played in the one-off Test match at County Road in Worcestershire. Opening the batting for the first time in Tests, she saw her partner Blackwell and Rolton fall for ducks and Sthalekar for six. Nitschke scored 15 and fell at 4/23. The tourists then fell to 5/38 before recovering to make 309. before taking 1/46 from 19 overs, dismissing Sarah Taylor to help Australia take a 41-run lead. She then made 25, putting on a stand of 49 for the first wicket with Blackwell as Australia set the hosts a target of 273 before the match was drawn. She took 0/20 from five overs in the second innings.

== Maiden limited-overs centuries ==
Nitschke started the 2009–10 WNCL season with a series of strong batting performances. After finishing in the nineties in three previous WNCL innings, Nitschke broke through for her maiden century. After hitting 119 not out and 66 in the double-header against the Australian Capital Territory, she made 12 and 82 against Western Australia, before striking her second century in five innings, 109 against Queensland. The centuries set up wins by 34 runs and two wickets respectively. Nitschke was not able to maintain her form in the remaining five matches, scoring 0, 3, 57, 0 and 38 to end the season with 486 runs at 54.00. After taking three wickets in each of the first two pairs of matches, Nitschke went wicketless in two matches against Queensland before totalling four wickets in the last four matches against Victoria and New South Wales. Her best figures of 2/26 came in the final match against New South Wales and she ended with 10 wickets at 36.50 and an economy rate of 4.10, a poor bowling season by her standards. South Australia won only two of then ten matches and missed the finals.

During the 2009–10 season, there was a full T20 domestic tournament was introduced. In six matches, Nitschke scored 161 runs at 26.83 with a best of 67 against Tasmania, and took four wickets at 31.00 at an economy rate of 5.20. South Australia won two of their six matches and missed the final.

After the series, Nitschke played in the Rose Bowl series against New Zealand, starting with five ODIs in Australia. Nitschke played in all of the matches and opened the batting, scoring 172 runs at 43.00 and regular got the hosts off to a strong start, passing 30 in each match bar the third. In the second match, she took 2/7 from seven overs and top-scored with 38 in a four-wicket win. In the third match at the Junction Oval, she took 3/31 from ten overs to seal a 102-run win and an unassailable 3–0 series lead. Nitschke took 2/29 from ten overs in the next match and made 44 not out in an unbroken opening stand of 163 with Leah Poulton to guide Australia to a ten-wicket win. In the final match, she hit 43, and then took 4/24 and two catches to help secure a 103-run win. Nitschke ended the series with 11 wickets at 10.36 and an economy rate of 2.85.

The ODIs were followed by three T20s at Bellerive Oval in Hobart and two more in New Zealand at the start of the second phase of the bilateral contests. Nitschke played in every match and was the leading scorer as Australia was whitewashed. In the first match, she took 2/14 from four overs and top-scored with 46. However, Australia lost momentum after her dismissal and ended on 7/115, losing by two runs. She took 1/23 from three overs and made 15 as Australia lost by one run the next day. In the third match, Nitschke was attacked by the touring batters, ending with 2/52 from her four overs. She then top-scored with 56 as Australia lost by seven runs. She went wicketless in the two matches in New Zealand, and scored 12 and 45, top-scoring in the latter match. Australia were bowled out for 73 and 98, losing by 59 and 17 runs respectively. Nitschke ended with 174 runs at 34.80 and took five wickets at 23.20 and the high economy rate of 7.73.

Australia then swept New Zealand 3–0 in the ODIs in New Zealand. In the first match, Nitschke took 1/12 from six overs and made 51 as Australia were able to scrape home by two wickets. The series then ended with matches on consecutive days in Invercargill. Nitschke was attacked on the first day, conceding 18 runs from three overs without taking a wicket, before opening the batting and scoring 113 not out of the tourists' 4/256 in a six-wicket win, registering her maiden ODI century. She made six and was wicketless in a six-wicket win in the final match. Nitschke ended the series with 170 runs at 85.00 and took 1/45 from 13 overs.

== 2010 World Twenty20 triumph ==
Nitschke was part of the 2010 World Twenty20 winning team in the West Indies and played in all of Australia's matches.

In the first warm-up match against New Zealand, which Australia lost by 18 runs, Nitschke had a hand in three dismissals. She took 1/20 from her four overs, removing Sara McGlashan before running out Sophie Devine and catching Elizabeth Perry. She then made 31 from 29 balls, hitting two sixes. In the last warm-up match against Pakistan, Nitschke made 11 from 15 balls and hit a six as Australia made 5/166. She then took a catch and 2/15 from three overs as Australia won by 82 runs.

Australia were grouped with defending champions England, South Africa and the West Indies. In the first match against England, Nitschke bowled Beth Morgan for 17, ending the largest partnership of the match (44) with top-scorer Sarah Taylor. This started a collapse as England lost their last eight wickets for 41 runs to be bowled out for 104 with 15 balls unused. Nitschke ended with 1/21 from four overs. In pursuit of 105 for victory, Nitschke and her partner Elyse Villani struggled and Australia lost both to be 2/10 from 3.1 overs; Nitschke made 3 from 8 balls. Eventually, Rene Farrell was run out going for the winning run from the third last ball available, leaving the scores tied.

A Super Over eventuated, and Nitschke was not used as Australia made 2/6 from their over. She was called upon to bowl Australia's over. On the third ball of the over, Claire Taylor was run out by Jess Cameron while trying to take a second run and England were at 1/5 after five balls. Beth Morgan hit Nitschke away and attempted to runs to take England to seven runs and a victory, but was not fast enough for Cameron's throw and was run out, tying the scores once again. Australia was awarded the match because they had hit more sixes in the match—Cameron scored the solitary six.

In the next match against South Africa, Nitschke was prominent with both bat and ball as Australia batted first. After Villani was out in the first over, Nitschke and new batsman Poulton counter-attacked. They brought up Australia's 50 in 33 balls, scoring 41 from 27 balls. Poulton was out for 39 after a stand of 58 runs in 37 balls, and Nitschke was eventually out for the top-score of 44 from 32 balls, including seven fours. This left the score at 3/101 after 11.2 overs, but Australia were unable to capitalise, and were bowled out for 155 in the last over after losing 6/16. Nitschke then took 2/21 from her four overs, removing Trisha Chetty and Susan Benade in the 11th and 13th overs as Australia completed a 22-run win. She was named the player of the match for her effort.

In the final group match against the West Indies, Nitschke scored 19 from 11 balls with four fours to help Australia to reach 33 without loss after 3.2 overs before being dismissed, Australia finished on 7/133. She was the most economical bowler in the match, taking 1/15 from her four overs, dismissing Britney Cooper to end the largest partnership in the match (46) as Australia won by nine runs to finish the group stage unbeaten at the top of their quartet.

Australia went on to face India in the semi-final. Nitschke was the most uneconomical Australian bowler, taking 0/26 from her four overs. In the run-chase of 120, her opening partner Villani fell in the first over. Joined by captain Blackwell, Nitschke counter-attacked and the pair put on 74 runs in 60 balls before Nitschke was out for 22 from 25 balls. The Australians eventually reached their target with seven wickets and seven balls to spare.

Australia batted first in the final against New Zealand, and Nitschke made only three runs from five balls before being trapped lbw by Sian Ruck, leaving Australia at 1/10 after 2.2 overs, and they later fell to be 3/20 in the sixth over, and 6/72 in the 16th over, before ending on 8/106. During the run-chase, Nitschke was the most economical Australian bowler, taking 1/10 from her four overs, dismissing Rachel Priest in the middle of the innings to leave New Zealand were at 5/36 after 11 overs, leaving them with 71 runs to score from the last 54 balls. Australian went on to win by three runs to take the tournament.

== Coaching career ==
Following the appointment of Matthew Mott as England men's limited overs coach, in May 2022 Nitschke became the interim head coach of the Australia women's national cricket team.

In September 2022, she was appointed as the full-time head coach of the Australia women's cricket team.

== Awards ==
- ICC Women's Cricketer of the Year – 2010
- Belinda Clark Award – 2009, 2010, 2011, 2012

| Preceded by Claire Taylor | ICC Women's Cricketer of the Year; 2010 | Succeeded by Stafanie Taylor |
