= Gary Tredrea =

Australian rules footballer and coach

Personal information
- Full name: Gary Tredrea
- Born: 6 October 1951 (age 75); Victoria
- Original team: Reservoir (MFL)
- Height: 175 cm (5 ft 9 in)
- Weight: 73 kg (161 lb)
- Positions: Half forward flank, midfielder

Playing career^{1}
Years	Club	Games (Goals)
1970–1972	Collingwood (VFL)	19 (6)
1973–76, 1978–79	Port Adelaide (SANFL)	65 (56)
1977	West Adelaide (SANFL)	6 (2)
Total		90 (64)
- ^{1} Playing statistics correct to the end of 1972.

Gary Tredrea (born 6 October 1951) is a former Australian rules footballer with Collingwood Football Club in the Victorian Football League (VFL) and Port Adelaide and West Adelaide in the South Australian National Football League (SANFL).

== Career ==
Originally from Metropolitan Football League (MFL) club Reservoir, the half forward flanker played 19 games and kicked 6 goals for Collingwood between 1970 and 1972.

Tredrea was initially going to head to Queensland but instead moved to South Australia where he played for Port Adelaide in the SANFL, making his SANFL debut in 1973.

Tredrea played 65 games with Port Adelaide and six games with West Adelaide before his premature retirement in 1979 due to a knee injury.

Following his retirement, Tredrea has remained involved with the SANFL and AFL arms of Port Adelaide, coaching junior and reserves grades before his appointment as reserves/assistant coach to Stephen Williams for the 1997 SANFL season.

== Personal life ==
Tredrea currently lives in Adelaide. He is the brother of Australian cricketers Sharon and Janette Tredrea and the father of Port Adelaide player Warren Tredrea.
