= Tunde Juhasz =

Australian cricketer (born 1969)

Personal information
- Full name: Tunde Juhasz
- Born: 25 June 1969 (age 57); Adelaide, Australia
- Batting: Right-handed
- Role: Wicket-keeper

International information
- National side: Australia (1991–1992)
- Test debut (cap 120): 26 January 1991 v India
- Last Test: 9 February 1991 v India
- ODI debut (cap 67): 17 January 1991 v New Zealand
- Last ODI: 22 January 1992 v England

Domestic team information
- Years: Team
- 1985/86–1995/96: South Australia

Career statistics
Competition	WTest	WODI	WFC	WLA
Matches	3	5	25	44
Runs scored	17	38	709	619
Batting average	17.00	12.66	28.36	17.68
100s/50s	0/0	0/0	0/5	0/2
Top score	9*	21	93	69*
Balls bowled	–	–	18	–
Wickets	–	–	0	–
Bowling average	–	–	–	–
5 wickets in innings	–	–	0	–
10 wickets in match	–	–	0	–
Best bowling	–	–	–	–
Catches/stumpings	6/–	4/0	21/5	25/9
- Source: CricketArchive, 31 December 2022

Tunde Juhasz (born 25 June 1969) is an Australian former cricketer who played as a wicket-keeper and right-handed batter. She appeared in three Test matches and five One Day Internationals for Australia in 1991 and 1992. She played domestic cricket for South Australia.
