= Reservoir Football Club =

Names
- Full name: Reservoir Sporting Club
- Nickname(s): The Mustangs

2024 season

Club details
- Founded: 1923
- Colours: Royal blue and light blue
- Competition: Northern Football League
- Coach: Rohan Davies
- Ground(s): Crispe Park

Other information
- Official website: reservoirfc.com.au

The Reservoir Football Club is an Australian rules football club located 12 km north of Melbourne in the suburb of Reservoir.

== History ==
Founded in 1923, the club initially competed in the Bourke-Evelyn Football League. After moving from Diamond Valley, Metropolitan, and Panton Hill football leagues, the club settled in the Diamond Valley Football League, now known as the Northern Football League, in 1981 where the club has remained since.

The club has juniors which have won several under-age premierships in DVFL and the PDJFA.

Due to a shortage of players for season 2007, the Reservoir Football Club went into recess but resumed in 2008.

In 2009 the NFL Division 2 split. The bottom 6 teams (out of 14) dropped down and created Division 3. Reservoir were placed 13th and were relegated to Division 3 where they have competed ever since.

== Premiership years ==
- 1946, 1947, 1959, 1972, 1975, 1976, 1984, 2015

== VFL/AFL players ==
- Ross Lyon (Reservoir Colts)
- Jason Heatley (Reservoir Colts)
- Trent Cotchin (Reservoir Colts)
- Gary Tredrea (Reservoir Colts)
