= Debbie Wilson (cricketer) =

Australian cricketer

Personal information
- Full name: Deborah Lea Wilson
- Born: 23 March 1961 (age 65); Sydney, Australia
- Batting: Left-handed
- Bowling: Right-arm fast
- Role: Bowler
- Relatives: Bev Wilson (sister)

International information
- National side: Australia (1984–1991)
- Test debut (cap 106): 13 December 1984 v England
- Last Test: 9 February 1991 v India
- ODI debut (cap 40): 31 January 1985 v England
- Last ODI: 20 January 1991 v New Zealand

Domestic team information
- Years: Team
- 1978/79–1985/86: New South Wales
- 1986/87–1990/91: Western Australia

Career statistics
Competition	WTest	WODI	WFC	WLA
Matches	11	11	41	36
Runs scored	170	35	407	202
Batting average	56.66	17.50	21.42	13.46
100s/50s	0/1	0/0	0/2	0/0
Top score	91*	29*	91*	38
Balls bowled	2,812	656	7,173	2,332
Wickets	48	7	147	51
Bowling average	18.33	44.71	14.76	17.11
5 wickets in innings	2	0	8	1
10 wickets in match	0	0	0	0
Best bowling	5/27	2/24	6/14	5/15
Catches/stumpings	4/–	1/–	16/–	10/–
- Source: CricketArchive, 13 January 2023

Deborah Lea "Debbie" Wilson (born 23 March 1961) is an Australian former cricketer who played primarily as a right-arm fast bowler. She appeared in 11 Test matches and 11 One Day Internationals for Australia between 1984 and 1991. She played domestic cricket for New South Wales and Western Australia.

Wilson's older sister, Bev, also played international cricket for Australia.

Wilson holds the record for the highest individual Test score by a woman cricketer when batting at number 9 position or lower in women's Test history, with 91*.
