= Annette Fellows =

Australian cricketer

Personal information
- Full name: Annette Fellows
- Born: 8 April 1955 (age 71); Adelaide, Australia
- Batting: Right-handed
- Bowling: Right-arm off break
- Role: Batter

International information
- National side: Australia (1984)
- Test debut (cap 102): 28 January 1984 v India
- Last Test: 21 December 1984 v England
- ODI debut (cap 34): 19 January 1984 v India
- Last ODI: 8 February 1984 v India

Domestic team information
- Years: Team
- 1976/77–1991/92: South Australia

Career statistics
Competition	WTest	WODI	WFC	WLA
Matches	3	3	28	35
Runs scored	53	48	829	381
Batting average	10.60	24.00	28.58	12.29
100s/50s	0/0	0/0	2/1	0/0
Top score	25	35*	119*	42
Balls bowled	48	–	414	66
Wickets	0	–	1	3
Bowling average	–	–	66.00	10.66
5 wickets in innings	0	–	0	0
10 wickets in match	0	–	0	0
Best bowling	–	–	1/6	2/12
Catches/stumpings	2/–	1/–	19/–	12/–
- Source: CricketArchive, 21 April 2022

Annette Fellows (born 8 April 1955) is an Australian former cricketer who played primarily as a right-handed batter. She appeared in three Test matches and three One Day Internationals for Australia in 1984. She played domestic cricket for South Australia.
