= Jodi Dannatt =

Australian former cricket player

Personal information
- Full name: Jodi Maree Dannatt
- Batting: Right-handed
- Bowling: Right-arm medium-fast
- Role: Bowler

International information
- National side: Australia
- ODI debut (cap 84): 8 November 1997 v New Zealand
- Last ODI: 7 February 1999 v South Africa

Career statistics
Competition	ODI	FC	LA
Matches	10	4	48
Runs scored	61	149	402
Batting average	15.25	49.66	12.96
100s/50s	0/0	0/1	0/1
Top score	43	74*	51
Balls bowled	462	366	2,231
Wickets	11	5	45
Bowling average	18.36	27.80	24.11
5 wickets in innings	0	0	0
10 wickets in match	0	0	0
Best bowling	3/5	2/22	3/5
Catches/stumpings	2/-	1/–	14/–
- Source: Cricinfo, 4 May 2025

Jodi Dannatt (born 26 April 1971) is an Australian former cricket player. She played domestic cricket for the Queensland Women's cricket team between 1993 and 2000. Dannatt played ten One Day Internationals for the Australia national women's cricket team.
