= Sheila Hill =

English cricketer and umpire (1928–2022)

Sheila Hill MBE
Personal information
- Full name: Sheila Dorothy Hill
- Born: 10 August 1928; Pinner, Middlesex, England
- Died: 26 January 2022 (aged 93)
- Batting: Right-handed
- Bowling: Medium-pace
- Role: All-rounder

Domestic team information
- Years: Team
- 1954–1966: Kent
- 1974: Middlesex

Umpiring information
- WTests umpired: 3 (1976–1984)
- WODIs umpired: 8 (1973–1986)
- Source: CricketArchive, 4 March 2022

Sheila Dorothy Hill MBE (10 August 1928 – 26 January 2022) was an English cricketer, umpire, scorer and administrator, who was appointed an MBE in 2011. She was also a mathematics teacher. She played domestic cricket for the Kent county side as well as one match for Middlesex, and for Kent Nomads and the East of England. She was a right-handed middle-order batter and an accurate medium-paced bowler, though The Times says that she bowled only occasionally. She could also keep wicket. Because some scorebooks from the period have been lost, her complete statistics are unknown. Her highest known score for Kent, in 24 matches, was only 14, but she once made 83 not out for Kent Nomads.

She achieved much greater distinction as an umpire and administrator than as a player. She was an umpire between 1972 and 1999, and had a natural authority as well as making good use of humour to defuse potentially awkward situations. She umpired in three women's Test matches and eight one-day internationals, including in the last match of the inaugural Women's Cricket World Cup in 1973, in which England beat Australia to win the competition (it was run on a league rather than a knock-out basis).

After retiring from teaching, in 1988 she became chair of Gunnersbury Women's Cricket Club, before being in charge of the development of the Women's Southern League. She joined the council of the Women's Cricket Association which ran the women's game in England.

Her administrative roles extended beyond women's cricket. She helped with the development of the Association of Cricket Umpires and Scorers, and in 1975 she was the first woman to be elected to its general council. In 1989 she became chairman, the first woman to head a major international cricketing organisation. She also revised the Association's textbook Cricket Umpiring and Scoring. For a quarter of a century she was a member of the MCC's Laws sub-committee, not stepping down till she was 87. She made a significant contribution to the revision of the Laws adopted in 2000. According to Robert Griffiths QC, who chaired the committee, "Sheila combined an analytical mind of a natural logician and conceptual thinker with a deep understanding of the role of a legislator." In 1999, amid great media attention, she was one of the first ten women granted honorary MCC membership, entitling her to enter the Lord's pavilion and its Long Room.

== Life outside cricket ==
She was the middle daughter of Stuart Hill, an electrical engineer, and his wife Dorothy. Though born in Pinner, she spent most of her childhood in Kent, where she attended Bromley Girls' Grammar School. She read mathematics at Somerville College, Oxford, from 1946 to 1949, and captained the college cricket team.

She started work as a teacher in Blackheath, before moving to Caterham. Around this time, she briefly had tuberculosis and had to recuperate in a sanatorium. She went to St Paul's Girls' School in London in 1959 as head of mathematics, where she was an inspirational teacher for three decades. She never married.
