= Marie Cornish =

Australian cricketer

Personal information
- Full name: Marie Janice Cornish
- Born: 1 October 1956 (age 70); Wellington, New South Wales, Australia
- Batting: Right-handed
- Bowling: Right-arm off break
- Role: All-rounder

International information
- National side: Australia (1976–1982)
- Test debut (cap 85): 7 May 1976 v West Indies
- Last Test: 26 January 1979 v New Zealand
- ODI debut (cap 15): 1 August 1976 v England
- Last ODI: 7 February 1982 v England

Domestic team information
- Years: Team
- 1974/75–1981/82: New South Wales

Career statistics
Competition	WTest	WODI	WFC	WLA
Matches	9	16	32	33
Runs scored	90	147	446	289
Batting average	15.00	24.50	17.15	19.26
100s/50s	0/0	0/1	0/2	0/1
Top score	46*	55*	56	55*
Balls bowled	1,845	866	4,815	1,782
Wickets	25	16	76	36
Bowling average	20.12	17.06	16.56	16.61
5 wickets in innings	1	0	1	0
10 wickets in match	0	0	0	0
Best bowling	5/51	3/22	5/51	3/8
Catches/stumpings	6/–	2/–	17/–	6/–
- Source: CricketArchive, 10 November 2023

Marie Janice Cornish OAM (née Lutschini; born 1 October 1956) is an Australian former cricketer who played as a right-arm off break bowler and right-handed batter. She appeared in nine Test matches and 16 One Day Internationals for Australia between 1976 and 1982. She was vice-captain of the national team and played in Australia's victorious teams at the 1978 and 1982 Women's Cricket World Cups. She played domestic cricket for New South Wales.

== Personal life ==
Cornish was born Marie Janice Lutschini on 1 October 1956 in Wellington, New South Wales. She was the daughter of Peter and Jan Lutschini. Her paternal grandfather immigrated to Australia from the Soviet Union via Italy and Canada; his original Russian surname was Italianised. Her mother is of South African descent. Her brother Mitchell is a businessman in Papua New Guinea and has served as deputy chairman of Cricket PNG.

Cornish grew up in country New South Wales where her father worked as a farmhand. She spent her early years in Ivanhoe before the family settled in Wellington, where she attended Wellington High School.

== Cricket career ==
From a young age Cornish played cricket on boys' teams. At the age of 15 she top-scored for the New South Wales Under-25s against New Zealand.

=== International career ===
Cornish made her international debut for Australia on a 1976 tour of the West Indies, aged 19. In the second Test of the series she took 5/51.

Named vice-captain of Australia at the age of 22, Cornish played at the 1978 World Cup in India and the 1982 in New Zealand. She was at the crease when the winning runs were scored in the 1982 World Cup final against England, finishing with 24 not out as Australia won by three wickets with one over to spare.

== Personal life ==
Cornish retired from international cricket at the age of 25 to work full-time at the Commonwealth Bank. She had two children with her husband Peter, and remained involved in cricket as a coach, manager, and selector.

In 2008, Cornish was awarded the Medal of the Order of Australia (OAM) for services to cricket and the Wellington community. She was named a life member of Cricket New South Wales in 2012 and the Marie Cornish Trophy is awarded to the winner of the state schoolgirls' knockout competition.
