= Bev Wilson =

Australian cricketer (born 1949)

Personal information
- Full name: Beverley Wilson
- Born: 1 January 1949 (age 77); Sydney, Australia
- Batting: Right-handed
- Role: Batter
- Relatives: Debbie Wilson (sister)

International information
- National side: Australia (1972–1975)
- Test debut (cap 71): 5 February 1972 v New Zealand
- Last Test: 21 March 1975 v New Zealand
- ODI debut (cap 11): 23 June 1973 v Young England
- Last ODI: 28 July 1973 v England

Domestic team information
- Years: Team
- 1966/67–1982/83: New South Wales

Career statistics
Competition	WTest	WODI	WFC	WLA
Matches	2	6	30	35
Runs scored	88	130	1,142	1,195
Batting average	22.00	26.00	24.82	39.83
100s/50s	0/1	0/1	0/6	2/8
Top score	51	50	94	110
Balls bowled	–	–	16	–
Wickets	–	–	0	–
Bowling average	–	–	–	–
5 wickets in innings	–	–	0	–
10 wickets in match	–	–	0	–
Best bowling	–	–	–	–
Catches/stumpings	1/–	2/–	7/–	3/–
- Source: CricketArchive, 15 November 2023

Beverley Wilson (born 1 January 1949) is an Australian former cricketer who played as a right-handed batter. She appeared in two Test matches and six One Day Internationals for Australia between 1972 and 1975. She played domestic cricket for New South Wales.

Wilson was the captain of New South Wales for three seasons from 1970/71 to 1973/74.

Wilson's younger sister Debbie also played Test and One Day International cricket for Australia.
