= Lynda Prichard =

New Zealand cricketer (born 1950)

Personal information
- Full name: Lynda Myra Prichard
- Born: 12 March 1950 (age 76); Taumarunui, King Country, New Zealand
- Batting: Right-handed
- Bowling: Right-arm medium
- Role: Batter

International information
- National side: New Zealand (1972–1975)
- Test debut (cap 60): 5 February 1972 v Australia
- Last Test: 21 March 1975 v Australia
- ODI debut (cap 10): 23 June 1973 v Trinidad and Tobago
- Last ODI: 21 July 1973 v Young England

Domestic team information
- Years: Team
- 1966/67–1981/82: Auckland

Career statistics
Competition	WTest	WODI	WFC	WLA
Matches	5	5	54	16
Runs scored	188	73	2,093	337
Batting average	20.88	18.25	23.51	22.46
100s/50s	0/1	0/1	0/10	0/3
Top score	66	70	77	70
Balls bowled	18	–	30	–
Wickets	0	–	0	–
Bowling average	–	–	–	–
5 wickets in innings	0	–	0	–
10 wickets in match	0	–	0	–
Best bowling	–	–	–	–
Catches/stumpings	2/–	1/–	31/–	4/–
- Source: CricketArchive, 14 November 2021

Lynda Myra Prichard (born 12 March 1950) is a New Zealand former cricketer who played as a right-handed batter. She appeared in five Test matches and five One Day Internationals for New Zealand between 1972 and 1975. She played domestic cricket for Auckland.
