= Julie Stockton =

Australian cricketer

Personal information
- Full name: Julie Mary Stockton
- Born: 19 April 1959 (age 67); Sydney, Australia
- Batting: Right-handed
- Role: Wicket-keeper

International information
- National side: Australia (1976–1979)
- Test debut (cap 90): 12 January 1979 v New Zealand
- Last Test: 26 January 1979 v New Zealand
- ODI debut (cap 18): 1 August 1976 v England
- Last ODI: 1 January 1978 v New Zealand

Domestic team information
- Years: Team
- 1975/76–1978/79: New South Wales

Career statistics
Competition	WTest	WODI	WFC
Matches	3	3	13
Runs scored	162	7	308
Batting average	40.50	3.50	30.80
100s/50s	1/0	0/0	1/0
Top score	117	4	117
Balls bowled	24	0	24
Wickets	0	–	0
Bowling average	–	–	–
5 wickets in innings	0	–	0
10 wickets in match	0	–	0
Best bowling	–	–	–
Catches/stumpings	6/1	1/–	20/1
- Source: Cricket Archive, 16 March 2023

Julie Mary Stockton (née Robinson; born 19 April 1959) is an Australian former cricketer who played as a wicket-keeper and right-handed batter. She appeared in three Test matches and three One Day Internationals for Australia between 1976 and 1979. She scored a century on her Test match debut, with 117 against New Zealand. She played domestic cricket for New South Wales.

Stockton was the captain of New South Wales during the 1978/79 season. At the time of her appointment, she was the youngest person to lead a New South Wales cricket team.
