= Betty McDonald =

Australian cricketer (born 1950)

Personal information
- Full name: Betty McDonald
- Born: 1950 (age 75–76); Western Australia, Australia
- Batting: Left-handed
- Bowling: Left-arm medium
- Role: Bowler

International information
- National sides: International XI (1973); Australia (1976)
- Only Test (cap 86): 3 July 1976; Australia v England
- ODI debut (cap 7): 23 June 1973; International XI v England
- Last ODI: 21 July 1973; International XI v Australia

Domestic team information
- Years: Team
- 1972/73: Western Australia
- 1974/75–1981/82: South Australia

Career statistics
Competition	WTest	WODI	WFC	WLA
Matches	1	6	14	23
Runs scored	–	22	72	148
Batting average	–	22.00	9.00	11.38
100s/50s	–	0/0	0/0	0/0
Top score	–	10*	22*	27*
Balls bowled	66	354	1,490	1,203
Wickets	0	4	34	14
Bowling average	–	34.60	13.96	29.50
5 wickets in innings	0	0	2	1
10 wickets in match	0	0	0	0
Best bowling	–	2/33	7/44	6/17
Catches/stumpings	0/–	0/–	1/–	1/–
- Source: CricketArchive, 14 March 2022

Betty McDonald (born 1950) is an Australian former cricketer who played as a left-arm medium bowler. She appeared in one Test match for Australia in 1976, and six One Day Internationals for International XI at the 1973 World Cup. She played domestic cricket for Western Australia and South Australia.
