= Watford Town Cricket Club Ground =

Cricket ground in Watford, England

Coordinates: 51°41′36.66″N 0°23′44.41″W

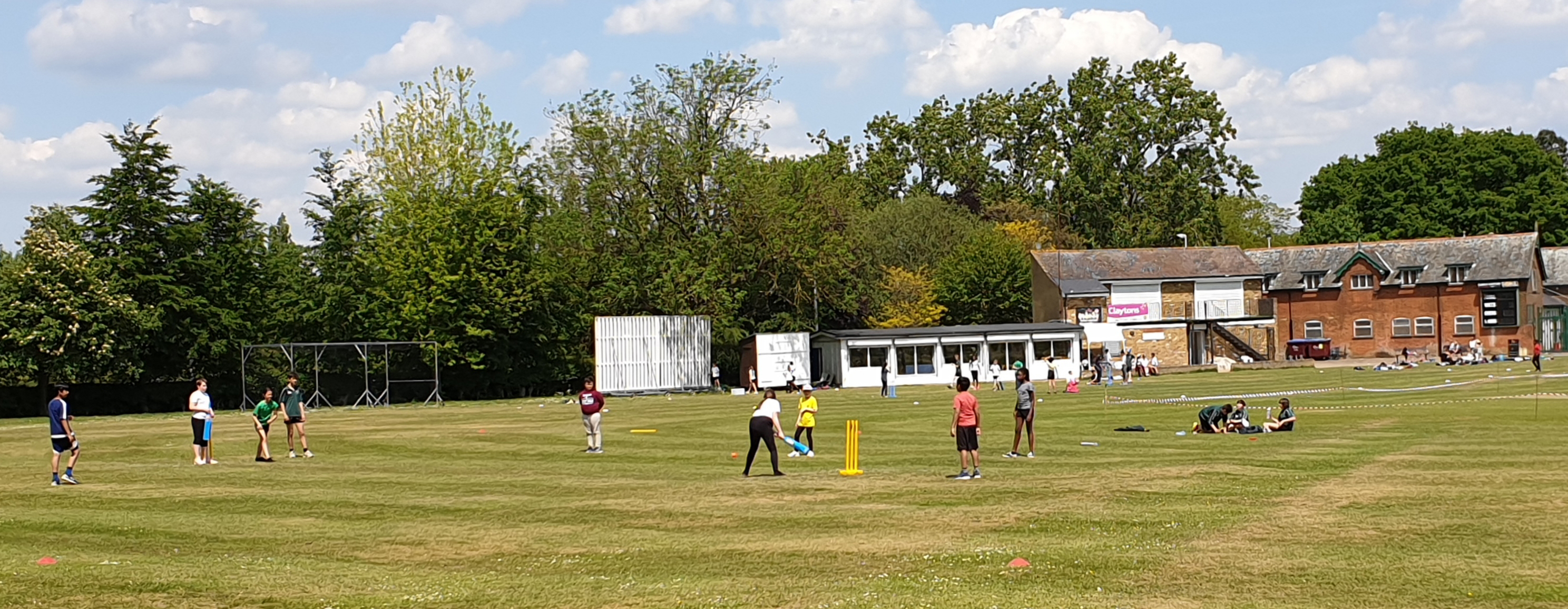
- Interactive map of Watford Town Cricket Club Ground

Ground information
- Location: Watford, Hertfordshire
- Country: England
- Establishment: 1944 (first recorded match)

Team information
Middlesex	(1981)
Hertfordshire	(1976–1991)
- As of 25 July 2010; Source: Ground profile

Watford Town Cricket Club Ground, at Woodside Playing Fields, is a cricket ground on the northern outskirts of Watford, Hertfordshire. The first recorded match on the ground was in 1944, when the Combined Services played Northamptonshire. In 1976, the ground hosted its first Minor Counties Championship match when Hertfordshire played Norfolk. From 1976 to 1991, the ground played host to 11 Minor Counties Championship matches and a single MCCA Knockout Trophy match.

The ground has also hosted List-A matches. The first List-A match held on the ground came in the 1977 Benson & Hedges Cup when Minor Counties West played Derbyshire. The following year the ground was used once again by Minor Counties West in the 1978 competition against Lancashire. The following year Minor Counties South used the ground as a home venue, in a match against Glamorgan. In 1980, a combined Minor Counties team played against Essex in the 1980 Benson & Hedges Cup. In 1981, Middlesex used the ground for a List-A match against the touring Sri Lankans.

In 1983 the ground was selected to host a 'warm-up' match ahead of the World Cup, between India and New Zealand. The quality of the pitches was the main reason for the selection of an amateur club's ground, thanks to the efforts and expertise of groundsman Peter Southam who was an employee of Watford Borough (which still owns Woodside) and devoted his time and attention to the Woodside sports pitches, especially cricket and bowls.

In local domestic cricket, Watford Town Cricket Club Ground is the home ground of Watford Town Cricket Club.

In May 2021 Watford Borough Council announced plans to improve the Woodside Playing Fields park area, including a new cricket pavilion.
