= Janet Mitchell (cricketer) =

Barbadian cricketer

Personal information
- Full name: Janet Mitchell
- Born: Barbados
- Batting: Right-handed
- Role: Wicket-keeper

International information
- National side: West Indies (1976)
- Only Test (cap 7): 7 May 1976 v Australia

Domestic team information
- Years: Team
- 1975/76–1980: Barbados

Career statistics
Competition	WTest	WFC	WLA
Matches	1	4	4
Runs scored	4	43	47
Batting average	4.00	14.33	11.75
100s/50s	0/0	0/0	0/0
Top score	4	24	33
Catches/stumpings	0/0	7/1	2/1
- Source: CricketArchive, 18 December 2021

Janet Mitchell is a Barbadian former cricketer who played as a wicket-keeper and right-handed batter. She appeared in one Test match for the West Indies in 1976. She scored 4 runs in the only batting innings for the West Indies. She did not claim any victims behind the stumps as all but one of the eight Australian wicket to fall were either leg before wicket or bowled. She played domestic cricket for Barbados.
