= Karen Price =

American actress (born 1960)

Playboy centerfold appearance
- January 1981
- Preceded by: Terri Welles
- Succeeded by: Vicki Lasseter

Personal details
- Born: July 17, 1960 (age 65) Pasadena, California
- Height: 5 ft 5 in (1.65 m)

Karen Elaina Price (born July 17, 1960) is an American model, actress, stunt woman and television producer. She is sometimes credited as Karen Castoldi. She was Playboy magazine's Playmate of the Month in January 1981. Her centerfold was photographed by Ken Marcus.

== Career ==
After she became a Playmate, Price started acting, but soon switched to performing stunts for over two dozen movies including Leonard Part 6 (1987), Police Academy 2: Their First Assignment (1985), The Golden Child (1986) and The Running Man (1987). After a hiatus, she began a new career as an associate producer of television programs such as Amazing Vacation Homes (2004) and Amazing Babies (2005).

Price made a cameo appearance of sorts in the early Mel Gibson film The Road Warrior - her centerfold is pasted onto a tailfin of Gyro Captain's Benson gyrocopter.

== See also ==
- List of people in Playboy 1980–1989

Karen Price	Vicki Lasseter	Kymberly Herrin	Lorraine Michaels	Gina Goldberg	Cathy Larmouth
Heidi Sorenson	Debbie Boostrom	Susan Smith	Kelly Tough	Shannon Tweed	Patricia Farinelli
