= Karen Price (cricketer) =

Australian cricketer

Personal information
- Full name: Karen Price
- Born: 7 May 1955 (age 71); Sydney, Australia
- Batting: Right-handed
- Bowling: Right-arm medium
- Role: All-rounder

International information
- National side: Australia (1975–1986)
- Test debut (cap 79): 21 March 1975 v New Zealand
- Last Test: 1 January 1985 v England
- ODI debut (cap 17): 1 August 1976 v England
- Last ODI: 25 January 1986 v New Zealand

Domestic team information
- Years: Team
- 1972/73–1986/87: New South Wales

Career statistics
Competition	WTest	WODI	WFC	WLA
Matches	8	16	36	26
Runs scored	278	39	475	112
Batting average	25.27	4.33	15.83	7.00
100s/50s	1/1	0/0	1/1	0/0
Top score	104*	16	104*	25
Balls bowled	1,724	903	4,729	1,219
Wickets	26	21	87	33
Bowling average	20.30	18.90	15.04	15.66
5 wickets in innings	1	0	3	0
10 wickets in match	1	0	1	0
Best bowling	6/72	3/12	7/22	3/5
Catches/stumpings	2/–	5/–	19/–	8/–
- Source: CricketArchive, 12 November 2023

Karen Price (née Hill; born 7 May 1955) is an Australian former cricketer who played as a right-arm medium bowler and right-handed batter. She appeared in eight Test matches and 16 One Day Internationals for Australia between 1975 and 1986. She played domestic cricket for New South Wales.

Price scored a Test match century and took a Test match five-wicket haul. She took 6/72 against India on 28 January 1984, and scored 104* in the following Test match on 3 February. She took 21 wickets at an average 18.90 in One Day Internationals.
