= Wendy Weir (cricketer) =

Australian cricketer (1948–2020)

Personal information
- Full name: Wendy Margaret Weir
- Born: 12 November 1948; Cronulla, Sydney, Australia
- Died: 28 November 2020 (aged 72)
- Batting: Right-handed
- Bowling: Slow left-arm orthodox
- Role: All-rounder

International information
- National side: Australia (1973–1979)
- Test debut (cap 81): 21 March 1975 v New Zealand
- Last Test: 12 January 1979 v New Zealand
- Only ODI (cap 14): 21 July 1973 v International XI

Domestic team information
- Years: Team
- 1967/68–1978/79: New South Wales

Career statistics
Competition	WTest	WODI	WFC	WLA
Matches	2	1	30	14
Runs scored	25	–	445	111
Batting average	25.00	–	17.80	15.85
100s/50s	0/0	–	0/1	0/0
Top score	25	–	74	47
Balls bowled	376	–	2,692	436
Wickets	4	–	78	13
Bowling average	44.50	–	12.34	17.92
5 wickets in innings	0	–	5	0
10 wickets in match	0	–	0	0
Best bowling	3/46	–	6/43	3/18
Catches/stumpings	0/–	0/–	5/–	0/–
- Source: CricketArchive, 11 November 2023

Wendy Margaret Weir (12 November 1948 – 28 November 2020) was an Australian cricketer who played as a slow left-arm orthodox bowler and right-handed batter. She appeared in two Test matches and one One Day International for Australia between 1973 and 1979. She played domestic cricket for New South Wales.
