= Anne Gordon =

Australian cricketer (born 1941)

Personal information
- Full name: Dorothy Anne Gordon
- Born: 24 December 1941 (age 84); Australia
- Batting: Right-handed
- Bowling: Left-arm medium
- Role: Bowler

International information
- National side: Australia (1968–1977)
- Test debut (cap 65): 27 December 1968 v England
- Last Test: 15 January 1977 v India
- ODI debut (cap 3): 23 June 1973 v Young England
- Last ODI: 8 August 1976 v England

Domestic team information
- Years: Team
- 1967/68–1976/77: Victoria
- 1986: West

Career statistics
Competition	WTest	WODI	WFC	WLA
Matches	9	8	33	26
Runs scored	195	99	608	261
Batting average	19.50	19.80	20.26	17.40
100s/50s	0/0	0/1	0/0	0/1
Top score	38*	50*	46	50*
Balls bowled	1,808	304	4,499	1,090
Wickets	22	7	93	27
Bowling average	23.09	21.28	13.09	18.55
5 wickets in innings	2	0	8	0
10 wickets in match	1	0	2	0
Best bowling	5/57	3/25	7/30	4/21
Catches/stumpings	4/–	5/–	15/–	7/–
- Source: CricketArchive, 24 November 2023

Dorothy Anne Gordon AM (born 24 December 1941) is an Australian former cricketer who played as a left-arm medium bowler. She appeared in nine Test matches and eight One Day Internationals for Australia between 1968 and 1977, including captaining the side in 1976. She played domestic cricket for Victoria, as well as playing one match for West.

She was the first fielder to take three catches in a Women's Cricket World Cup match.

Gordon lived and grew up in Moe, Gippsland, Victoria. After retiring from playing she became a selector for the Victoria Women's Cricket Association, Surrey and then England Selector and Chairwoman of England Selectors from 1992 to 1996. She was awarded life membership of Cricket Victoria in 2018.

Gordon was appointed a Member of the Order of Australia in the 2026 Australia Day Honours for "significant service to cricket as player, selector and administrator".
