= Janette Tredrea =

Australian cricketer (born 1956)

Personal information
- Full name: Janette Ruth Tredrea
- Born: 24 July 1956 (age 70); Carlton, Melbourne, Australia
- Batting: Right-handed
- Role: Batter
- Relatives: Gary Tredrea (brother); Sharon Tredrea (sister); Warren Tredrea (nephew)

International information
- National side: Australia (1976–1978)
- Test debut (cap 82): 7 May 1976 v West Indies
- Last Test: 24 July 1976 v England
- ODI debut (cap 19): 1 August 1976 v England
- Last ODI: 13 January 1978 v England

Domestic team information
- Years: Team
- 1974/75–1975/76: Victoria
- 1983/84–1984/85: South Australia

Career statistics
Competition	WTest	WODI	WFC	WLA
Matches	5	5	18	8
Runs scored	210	66	629	183
Batting average	30.00	16.50	33.10	36.60
100s/50s	0/1	0/0	1/2	0/1
Top score	67	37*	104*	88*
Catches/stumpings	3/–	2/–	5/–	2/–
- Source: CricketArchive, 11 November 2023

Janette Ruth Tredrea (born 24 July 1956) is an Australian former cricketer who played as a right-handed batter. She appeared in five Test matches and five One Day Internationals for Australia between 1976 and 1978. She played domestic cricket for Victoria and South Australia.

Janette Tredrea is the sister of Sharon Tredrea, who played ten Tests and 31 ODIs for Australia.
