= Kerry Mortimer =

Australian cricketer (born 1955)

Personal information
- Born: 30 July 1955 (age 71)
- Batting: Right-handed
- Bowling: Right-arm medium-fast

International information
- National side: Australia
- Only ODI (cap 21): 8 August 1976 v England

Career statistics
Competition	ODI
Matches	1
Runs scored	4
Batting average	–
100s/50s	0/0
Top score	4*
Balls bowled	18
Wickets	0
Bowling average	–
5 wickets in innings	–
10 wickets in match	–
Best bowling	–
Catches/stumpings	0/–
- Source: CricInfo, 19 April 2014

Kerry Mortimer (born 30 July 1955) is an Australian former cricket player. Mortimer played one Women's One Day International for the Australia women's national cricket team. She was born at Adelaide.
