= Jan Lumsden =

Australian cricketer

Personal information
- Full name: Janette Kennedy Lumsden
- Born: 2 October 1945 (age 81); Musselburgh, East Lothian, Scotland
- Batting: Right-handed
- Bowling: Right-arm off break
- Role: Batter

International information
- National side: Australia (1976–1978)
- Test debut (cap 84): 7 May 1976 v West Indies
- Last Test: 15 January 1977 v India
- ODI debut (cap 16): 1 August 1976 v England
- Last ODI: 8 January 1978 v India

Domestic team information
- Years: Team
- 1966/67–1968/69: South Australia
- 1969/70–1978/79: New South Wales

Career statistics
Competition	Test	ODI	WFC	WLA
Matches	6	5	35	20
Runs scored	345	62	1,036	314
Batting average	43.12	12.40	22.52	17.44
100s/50s	1/1	0/0	1/2	0/0
Top score	123	45	123	45
Balls bowled	106	–	1,148	277
Wickets	0	–	12	8
Bowling average	–	–	34.33	21.25
5 wickets in innings	0	–	0	0
10 wickets in match	0	–	0	0
Best bowling	–	–	2/15	3/51
Catches/stumpings	4/–	0/–	20/–	1/–
- Source: CricketArchive, 11 November 2023

Janette Kennedy Lumsden (born 2 October 1945) is an Australian former cricketer who played primarily as a right-handed batter. She appeared in six Test matches and five One Day Internationals for Australia between 1976 and 1978. She played domestic cricket for South Australia and New South Wales.

Lumsden scored one Test century, against England on 24 July 1976.
