= Wendy Hills =

Australian cricketer (born 1954)

Personal information
- Full name: Wendy Joan Hills
- Born: 1 August 1954 (age 72); Merredin, Western Australia
- Batting: Right-handed
- Bowling: Right-arm medium
- Role: All-rounder

International information
- National side: Australia (1976–1979)
- Test debut (cap 83): 7 May 1976 v West Indies
- Last Test: 26 January 1979 v New Zealand
- ODI debut (cap 20): 4 August 1976 v England
- Last ODI: 13 January 1978 v England

Domestic team information
- Years: Team
- 1972/73–1978/79: Western Australia

Career statistics
Competition	WTest	WODI	WFC	WLA
Matches	9	5	25	20
Runs scored	351	93	817	414
Batting average	31.90	23.25	27.23	27.60
100s/50s	0/1	0/1	0/3	0/3
Top score	69*	64	69*	75
Balls bowled	288	–	2,263	836
Wickets	1	–	28	16
Bowling average	78.00	–	21.60	20.93
5 wickets in innings	0	–	1	0
10 wickets in match	0	–	0	0
Best bowling	1/8	–	5/7	3/13
Catches/stumpings	2/–	0/–	5/–	4/–
- Source: CricketArchive, 11 November 2023

Wendy Joan Hills (born 1 August 1954) is an Australian former cricketer who played as a right-handed batter and right-arm medium bowler. She appeared in nine Test matches and five One Day Internationals for Australia between 1976 and 1979. She played domestic cricket for Western Australia.

Hills was a member of the Australian team that won the 1978 Women's Cricket World Cup.
