= Margaret Jennings (cricketer) =

Australian cricketer (born 1949)

Personal information
- Full name: Margaret Jean Jennings
- Born: 1 June 1949 (age 77); Essendon, Melbourne, Australia
- Batting: Right-handed
- Role: Wicket-keeper

International information
- National side: Australia (1972–1978)
- Test debut (cap 72): 5 February 1972 v New Zealand
- Last Test: 15 January 1977 v India
- ODI debut (cap 4): 23 June 1973 v Young England
- Last ODI: 13 January 1978 v England

Domestic team information
- Years: Team
- 1970/71–1978/79: Victoria

Career statistics
Competition	WTest	WODI	WFC	WLA
Matches	8	12	31	27
Runs scored	341	221	935	385
Batting average	28.41	31.57	25.97	29.61
100s/50s	1/2	0/1	1/4	0/1
Top score	104	57*	104	57*
Catches/stumpings	14/10	9/1	59/16	11/3
- Source: CricketArchive, 15 November 2023

Margaret Jean Jennings (born 1 June 1949) is an Australian former cricketer who played as a right-handed batter and wicket-keeper. She appeared in eight Test matches and 12 One Day Internationals for Australia between 1972 and 1978, and captained Australia in one Test match and three One Day Internationals. She played domestic cricket for Victoria.

She scored 341 Test match runs with a best of 104, her only century. Jennings was the first woman cricketer to keep wicket, open the batting and captain in a One Day International. She is also the only woman to do this in Test cricket.

After retiring from playing, Jennings was a selector for the Australian women's team for a number of years. She stepped down from the position in February 2013.

Jennings was inducted onto the Victorian Honour Roll of Women in 2009.
