= Sharon Tredrea =

Australian cricketer (born 1954)

Personal information
- Full name: Sharon Ann Tredrea
- Born: 30 June 1954 (age 72); Melbourne, Australia
- Batting: Right-handed
- Bowling: Right-arm fast
- Role: All-rounder
- Relatives: Gary Tredrea (brother); Janette Tredrea (sister); Warren Tredrea (nephew)

International information
- National side: Australia (1973–1988)
- Test debut (cap 80): 21 March 1975 v New Zealand
- Last Test: 13 December 1984 v England
- ODI debut (cap 10): 23 June 1973 v Young England
- Last ODI: 18 December 1988 v England

Domestic team information
- Years: Team
- 1972/73–1990/91: Victoria

Career statistics
Competition	WTest	WODI	WFC	WLA
Matches	10	31	48	64
Runs scored	346	528	1,434	1,107
Batting average	31.45	27.78	34.14	33.54
100s/50s	0/1	0/4	0/10	1/6
Top score	63	69	87	108*
Balls bowled	2,457	1,680	7,153	3,380
Wickets	30	32	133	73
Bowling average	26.13	16.28	14.66	14.55
5 wickets in innings	0	0	5	1
10 wickets in match	0	0	0	0
Best bowling	4/22	4/25	6/12	5/17
Catches/stumpings	8/–	8/–	19/–	16/–
Medal record
Women's Cricket
Representing Australia
ICC Women's Cricket World Cup
Runner-up	1973 England
Winner	1978 India
Winner	1982 New Zealand
Winner	1988 Australia
- Source: CricketArchive, 12 November 2023

Sharon Ann Tredrea (born 30 June 1954) is an Australian former cricketer who played as a right-arm fast bowler and right-handed batter. She appeared in 10 Test matches and 31 One Day Internationals for Australia between 1973 and 1988, including playing at the 1973, 1978, 1982 and 1988 World Cups. She is the only female player in history to be part of 3 World Cup winning teams. Her final international appearance was in the final of the 1988 World Cup. She played domestic cricket for Victoria.

In 2020 she was inducted into the Australian Cricket Hall of Fame. The best female player for Victoria is awarded the Sharon Tredrea Award.

Sharon Tredrea is the sister of Janette Tredrea, who played five Test matches and five One Day Internationals for Australia, and Australian rules footballer Gary Tredrea.
