= Wendy Blunsden =

Australian cricketer (1942–2020)

Personal information
- Full name: Wendy Ann Blunsden
- Born: 2 September 1942; Adelaide, Australia
- Died: 1 August 2020 (aged 77)
- Batting: Left-handed
- Bowling: Right-arm off break
- Role: Bowler

International information
- National side: Australia (1972–1976)
- Test debut (cap 74): 5 February 1972 v New Zealand
- Last Test: 24 July 1976 v England
- ODI debut (cap 1): 23 June 1973 v Young England
- Last ODI: 8 August 1976 v England

Domestic team information
- Years: Team
- 1961/62–1979/80: South Australia

Career statistics
Competition	WTest	WODI	WFC	WLA
Matches	7	7	58	20
Runs scored	53	20	826	138
Batting average	13.25	20.00	14.75	17.25
100s/50s	0/0	0/0	0/2	0/0
Top score	23*	10	52	41*
Balls bowled	1,520	224	8,028	936
Wickets	7	1	141	20
Bowling average	53.85	129.00	17.79	16.15
5 wickets in innings	0	0	6	0
10 wickets in match	0	0	1	0
Best bowling	2/13	1/7	8/16	4/8
Catches/stumpings	4/–	0/–	24/–	3/–
- Source: CricketArchive, 15 November 2023

Wendy Ann Blunsden (9 February 1942 – 1 August 2020) was an Australian cricketer who played primarily as a right-arm off break bowler. She appeared in seven Test matches and seven One Day Internationals for Australia between 1972 and 1976, and captained Australia in one Test match in 1975. She played domestic cricket for South Australia.
