= Raelee Thompson =

Australian cricketer

Raelee Thompson AM
Personal information
- Full name: Raelee Helen Thompson
- Born: 3 August 1945 (age 81); Shepparton, Victoria, Australia
- Batting: Right-handed
- Bowling: Right-arm medium
- Role: Bowler

International information
- National side: Australia (1972–1985)
- Test debut (cap 75): 5 February 1972 v New Zealand
- Last Test: 25 January 1985 v England
- ODI debut (cap 12): 30 June 1973 v Trinidad and Tobago
- Last ODI: 3 February 1985 v England

Domestic team information
- Years: Team
- 1969/70–1986/87: Victoria

Career statistics
| Competition | WTest | WODI | WFC | WLA |
|---|---|---|---|---|
| Matches | 16 | 23 | 66 | 47 |
| Runs scored | 162 | 207 | 537 | 339 |
| Batting average | 11.57 | 25.87 | 14.13 | 22.60 |
| 100s/50s | 0/0 | 0/1 | 0/0 | 0/1 |
| Top score | 25 | 50* | 43* | 50* |
| Balls bowled | 4,304 | 1,368 | 11,145 | 2,803 |
| Wickets | 57 | 24 | 213 | 67 |
| Bowling average | 18.24 | 18.66 | 11.84 | 13.76 |
| 5 wickets in innings | 1 | 0 | 12 | 2 |
| 10 wickets in match | 0 | 0 | 1 | 0 |
| Best bowling | 5/33 | 3/16 | 8/31 | 6/22 |
| Catches/stumpings | 12/– | 6/– | 31/– | 11/– |
- Source: CricketArchive, 13 November 2023

Raelee Thompson (born 3 August 1945) is an Australian former cricketer who played as a right-arm medium bowler. She appeared in 16 Test matches and 23 One Day Internationals for Australia between 1972 and 1985. She captained Australia during their 1984–85 series against England. She played domestic cricket for Victoria.

Thompson became the oldest player in Test cricket to take a maiden five-wicket haul in 1985, doing so against England at 39 years and 175 days of age. During that same series, Thompson captained Australia to victory, reclaiming The Women's Ashes for the first time in 30 years.

She was awarded life membership of Cricket Victoria in 2018, and was inducted into the Australian Cricket Hall of Fame in 2022.
