= Lorraine Hill =

Australian cricketer (born 1946)

Personal information
- Born: 24 October 1946 (age 80); Perth, Western Australia
- Batting: Left-handed
- Bowling: Right-arm medium
- Role: All-rounder

International information
- National side: Australia (1973–1978)
- Test debut (cap 78): 21 March 1975 v New Zealand
- Last Test: 15 January 1977 v India
- ODI debut (cap 13): 11 July 1973 v Jamaica
- Last ODI: 13 January 1978 v England

Domestic team information
- Years: Team
- 1969/70–1978/79: Victoria

Career statistics
Competition	WTest	WODI	WFC	WLA
Matches	7	8	29	24
Runs scored	499	143	1,182	730
Batting average	62.37	23.83	47.28	52.14
100s/50s	1/2	1/0	2/7	2/5
Top score	118*	106	118*	114
Balls bowled	144	237	1,371	724
Wickets	0	5	19	20
Bowling average	–	16.80	16.21	12.25
5 wickets in innings	–	0	0	0
10 wickets in match	–	0	0	0
Best bowling	–	4/11	4/12	4/11
Catches/stumpings	1/–	2/–	17/–	2/–
- Source: CricketArchive, 12 November 2023

Lorraine Hill (born 24 October 1946) is an Australian former cricketer who played as a left-handed batter and right-arm medium bowler. She appeared in seven Test matches and eight One Day Internationals for Australia between 1973 and 1978, and scored a century on Test debut. She played domestic cricket for Victoria.
