= Patsy May =

Australian cricketer (born 1947)

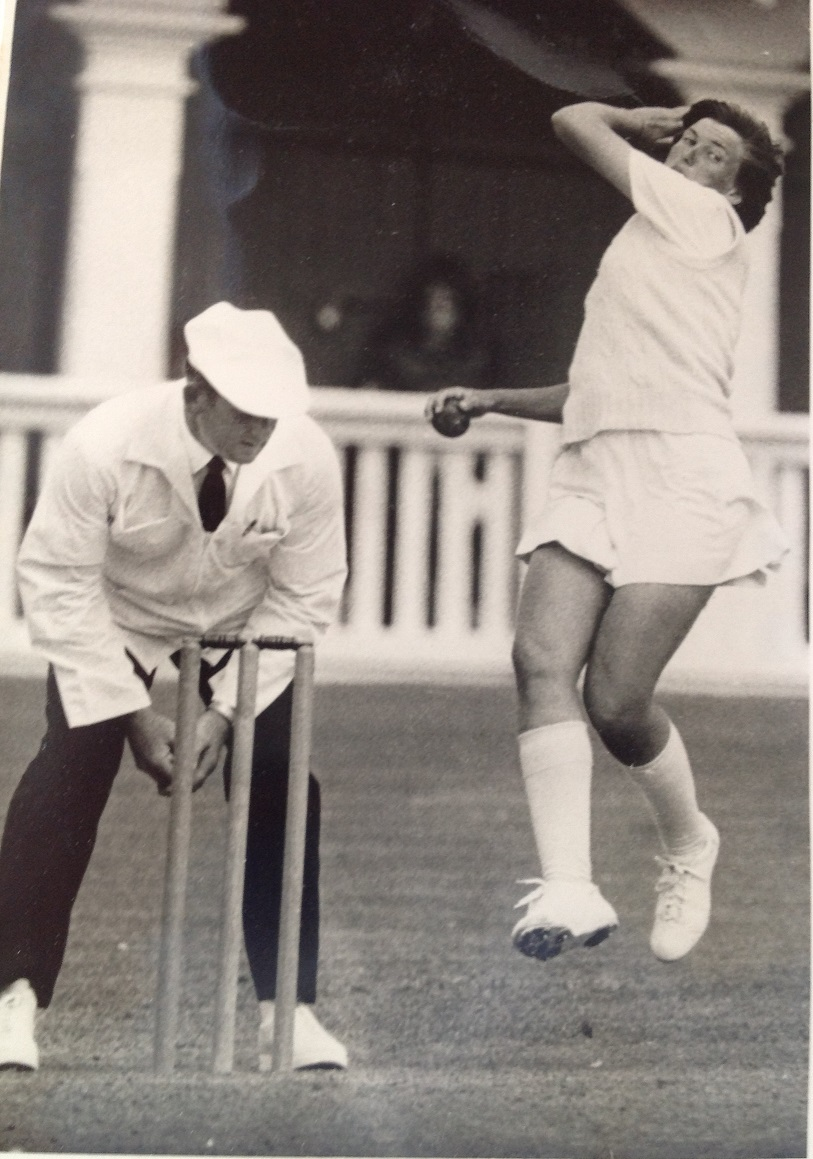
- May bowling in 1971

Personal information
- Full name: Patricia May
- Born: 22 August 1947 (age 79); Camberwell, Melbourne, Australia
- Batting: Right-handed
- Bowling: Right-arm medium
- Role: Bowler

International information
- National side: Australia (1968–1976)
- Test debut (cap 66): 27 December 1968 v England
- Last Test: 19 June 1976 v England
- ODI debut (cap 7): 23 June 1973 v Young England
- Last ODI: 8 August 1976 v England

Domestic team information
- Years: Team
- 1966/67–1975/76: New South Wales

Career statistics
Competition	WTest	WODI	WFC	WLA
Matches	7	9	35	19
Runs scored	38	16	202	45
Batting average	19.00	8.00	13.46	7.50
100s/50s	0/0	0/0	0/1	0/0
Top score	17	6*	56*	10*
Balls bowled	996	409	4,995	867
Wickets	6	7	85	16
Bowling average	53.16	23.71	13.84	16.31
5 wickets in innings	0	0	2	0
10 wickets in match	0	0	0	0
Best bowling	2/33	2/3	5/12	2/3
Catches/stumpings	2/–	0/–	14/–	1/–
- Source: CricketArchive, 22 November 2023

Patricia May (born 22 August 1947, married name Patricia Fayne) is an Australian former cricketer who played as a right-arm medium bowler. She appeared in seven Test matches and nine One Day Internationals for Australia between 1968 and 1976. She played domestic cricket for New South Wales.

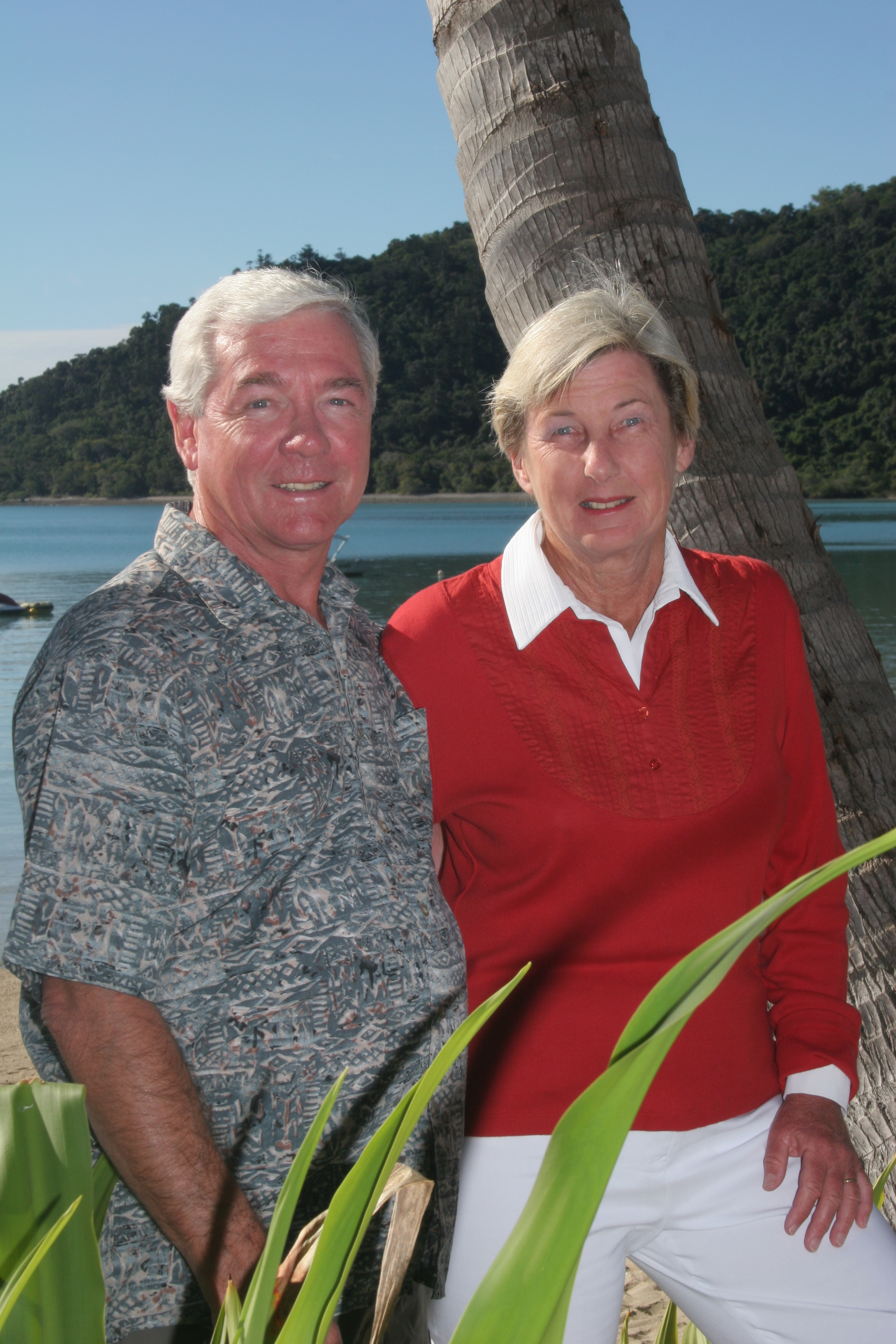
Patsy May and her husband Michael in 2006

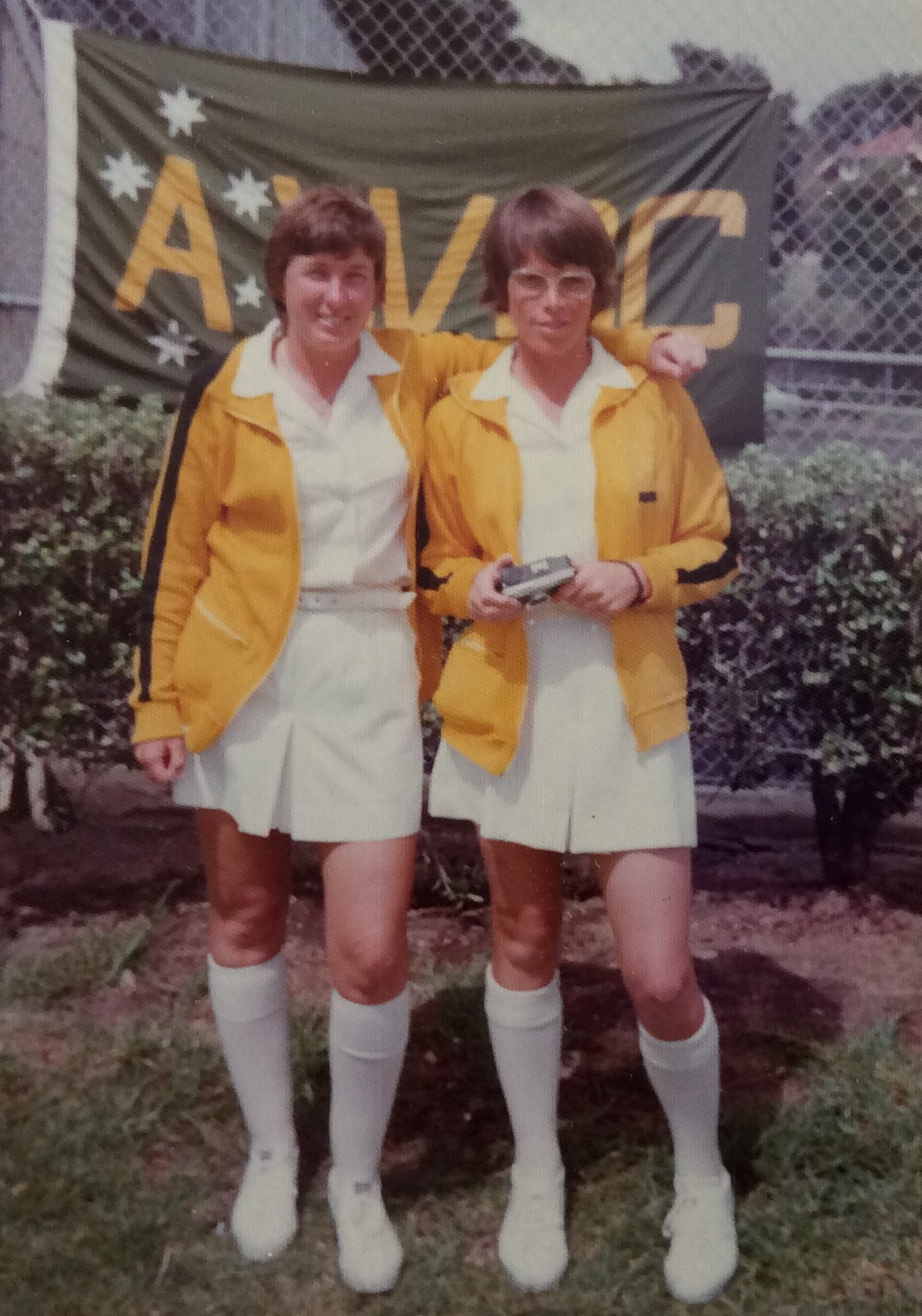
Patsy May (left) with Ann Mitchell in 1975

May was educated at Lindfield East Public School (1952–1959) and Wenona, North Sydney (1960–1964). She studied for a Bachelor of Education at The University of Sydney (1965–1968) where she was awarded a double Blue in Cricket and Softball.

May spent her working life with the NSW Department of Education teaching in the western suburbs of Sydney and retired as Deputy Principal of Dapto High School in 2000. She married Michael James Fayne in 1991, settling in Gerroa on the South Coast of NSW.

Her cricket story began in the back yard with brother David and continued with an annual game, Day Girls v Boarders, at Wenona. Her competitive cricket career began at Sydney University alongside Ann Mitchell (1965–1968) then with Graduates (1969–1985) She played for NSW Juniors (1965–1968), NSW Seniors (1966–1975) and the Australian Women's Cricket team (1968–1976). The highlight of her cricketing career was being the first Australian woman to take a wicket at Lord's.
