= New Zealand women's cricket team in Australia in 1986–87 =

New Zealand women's cricket team

	Australia	New Zealand
- Dates: 18 – 21 January 1987
Captains	Lyn Larsen	Debbie Hockley

One Day International series
- Results: New Zealand won the 3-match series 2–1
Most runs	Belinda Haggett (99)	Debbie Hockley (147)
Most wickets	Belinda Haggett (3)	Karen Gunn (5)

The New Zealand women's national cricket team toured Australia in January 1987. They played against Australia in three One Day Internationals, which were to contest the Rose Bowl. New Zealand won the series 2–1.

== Squads ==
Australia	New Zealand
Lyn Larsen (c); Karen Brown; Ruth Buckstein; Lynette Cook; Zoe Goss; Sally Griffiths; Belinda Haggett; Rhonda Kendall; Jill Kennare; Denise Martin; Sally Moffat; Lindsay Reeler; Cathy Smith (wk)	Debbie Hockley (c); Jackie Clark; Jeanette Dunning; Linda Fraser; Karen Gunn; Julie Harris; Ingrid Jagersma (wk); Brigit Legg; Ann McKenna; Liz Signal; Lois Simpson; Nancy Williams

== WODI Series ==
=== 1st ODI ===
18 January 1987
Scorecard

Australia; 181 (56.5 overs)	v	New Zealand; 182/2 (55.1 overs)
Jill Kennare 46 (–); Karen Gunn 2/26 (8 overs)		Debbie Hockley 89* (–); Belinda Haggett 1/23 (8 overs)

New Zealand Women won by 8 wickets
Willetton Sports Club No. 1, Perth
Umpires: R Gates (Aus) and R Zoch (Aus)

- New Zealand Women won the toss and elected to field.
- Zoe Goss, Sally Moffat, Cathy Smith (Aus) and Brigit Legg (NZ) all made their WODI debuts.

=== 2nd ODI ===
19 January 1987
Scorecard

Australia; 183/8 (60 overs)	v	New Zealand; 185/6 (59.5 overs)
Lindsay Reeler 73 (–); Karen Gunn 3/30 (12 overs)		Jackie Clark 51 (–); Sally Moffat 2/35 (12 overs)

New Zealand Women won by 4 wickets
Willetton Sports Club No. 1, Perth
Umpires: C Borsboom (Aus) and C Bambury (Aus)

- New Zealand Women won the toss and elected to field.
- Lynette Cook (Aus) made her WODI debut.

=== 3rd ODI ===
21 January 1987
Scorecard

New Zealand; 117/9 (56 overs)	v	Australia; 118/2 (45.4 overs)
Ingrid Jagersma 26 (–); Sally Griffiths 2/14 (10 overs)		Belinda Haggett 52* (–); Julie Harris 2/25 (12 overs)

Australia Women won by 8 wickets
Rosalie Parks, Perth
Umpires: C Borsboom (Aus) and R Hawks (Aus)

- Australia Women won the toss and elected to field.
- Match reduced to 56 overs per side due to rain.
- Julie Harris (NZ) made her WODI debut.
