= Australia women's cricket team in New Zealand in 1987–88 =

Australian women's cricket team

	New Zealand	Australia
- Dates: 20 – 25 January 1988
Captains	Debbie Hockley	Lyn Larsen

One Day International series
- Results: Australia won the 3-match series 3–0
Most runs	Ingrid Jagersma (90)	Zoe Goss (115); Sharlene Heywood (115)
Most wickets	Brigit Legg (5); Nancy Williams (5)	Lyn Fullston (5); Karen Brown (5)

The Australia women's national cricket team toured New Zealand in January 1988. They played against New Zealand in three One Day Internationals, which were competed for the Rose Bowl. Australia won the series 3–0.

== Squads ==
New Zealand	Australia
Debbie Hockley (c); Jackie Clark; Jeanette Dunning; Karen Gunn; Julie Harris; Ingrid Jagersma (wk); Penny Kinsella; Brigit Legg; Lesley Murdoch; Liz Signal; Lois Simpson; Nancy Williams	Lyn Larsen (c); Denise Annetts; Karen Brown; Ruth Buckstein; Jodie Davis; Lyn Fullston; Zoe Goss; Belinda Haggett; Glenda Hall; Sharlene Heywood; Christina Matthews (wk); Sally Moffat; Kerry Saunders

== WODI Series ==
=== 1st ODI ===
20 January 1988
Scorecard

Australia; 197 (60 overs)	v	New Zealand; 189 (59.5 overs)
Sharlene Heywood 50 (–); Nancy Williams 3/37 (12 overs)		Penny Kinsella 53 (–); Lyn Larsen 2/25 (12 overs)

Australia Women won by 8 runs
Eden Park, Auckland

- New Zealand Women won the toss and elected to field.
- Kerry Saunders (Aus) and Penny Kinsella (NZ) both made their WODI debuts.

=== 2nd ODI ===
23 January 1988
Scorecard

Australia; 209/6 (60 overs)	v	New Zealand; 181 (59 overs)
Sharlene Heywood 54 (–); Jeanette Dunning 1/29 (9 overs)		Jackie Clark 35 (–); Lyn Fullston 3/32 (12 overs)

Australia Women won by 28 runs
Lancaster Park, Christchurch

- Australia Women won the toss and elected to bat.

=== 3rd ODI ===
25 January 1988
Scorecard

New Zealand; 168 (59.5 overs)	v	Australia; 169/6 (53 overs)
Ingrid Jagersma 58* (–); Karen Brown 3/35 (11.5 overs)		Zoe Goss 96* (–); Brigit Legg 2/24 (12 overs)

Australia Women won by 4 wickets
Basin Reserve, Wellington

- New Zealand Women won the toss and elected to bat.
- Jodie Davis (Aus) made her WODI debut.
