= New Zealand women's cricket team in England and the Netherlands in 1984 =

New Zealand women's cricket team in England in 1984
	England	New Zealand
- Dates: 16 June – 4 August 1984
Captains	Jan Southgate	Debbie Hockley

Test series
- Result: 3-match series drawn 0–0
Most runs	Jan Brittin (338)	Ann McKenna (229)
Most wickets	Carole Hodges (6); Avril Starling (6)	Shona Gilchrist (6)

One Day International series
- Results: England won the 3-match series 3–0
Most runs	Jan Brittin (258)	Debbie Hockley (90); Sue Rattray (90)
Most wickets	Avril Starling (4)	Linda Fraser (6)

The New Zealand women's national cricket team toured England and the Netherlands between June and August 1984. They played England in three Test matches and three One Day Internationals, with the Test series ending as a 0–0 draw and the ODI series ending as a 3–0 victory for England. They then played the Netherlands in 1 ODI, as part of the Nederlandsche Dames Cricket Bond 50th Anniversary Tournament, which was Netherlands' first full international match.

== Squads ==
England	New Zealand
Jan Southgate (c); Jan Brittin; Jacqueline Court; June Edney (wk); Carole Hodges; Megan Lear; Gillian McConway; Sue Metcalfe; Catherine Mowat; Sarah Potter; Jane Powell; Avril Starling; Jill Stockdale; Helen Stother; Janet Tedstone; Chris Watmough	Debbie Hockley (c); Sue Brown; Jackie Clark; Di Caird; Jeanette Dunning; Linda Fraser; Shona Gilchrist; Ingrid Jagersma (wk); Ann McKenna; Karen Plummer; Sue Rattray; Liz Signal; Rose Signal; Nicki Turner

== Tour Matches ==
=== England ===
==== 1-day single innings match: Thames Valley and Middlesex Second XI v New Zealand ====
16 June 1984
Scorecard

New Zealand; 263/4d (57 overs)	v	Thames Valley and Middlesex Second XI; 44 (26.1 overs)
Ann McKenna 92 (–); Brenda Hague 1/29 (5 overs)		Judith Walmsley 18 (–); Sue Rattray 4/8 (6 overs)

New Zealand Women won by 219 runs
Little Missenden Cricket Club, Little Missenden
Umpires: Jane Ayres (Eng) and Peter Forsyth (Eng)

- New Zealand Women won the toss and elected to bat.

==== 40-over match: Middlesex v New Zealand ====
17 June 1984
Scorecard

Middlesex; 49 (37.2 overs)	v	New Zealand; 28/1 (19 overs)
Caroline Nolder 12 (–); Jeanette Dunning 6/13 (10 overs)		Nicki Turner 13 (–); Susan Everitt 1/12 (4 overs)

New Zealand Women won on faster scoring rate
CAV and Rotax Sports Ground, Northolt
Umpires: Sheila Hill (Eng) and Esme Irwin (Eng)

- Middlesex Women won the toss and elected to bat.
- When play was stopped due to rain, New Zealand Women needed to have scored 24 runs to win.

==== 1-day single innings match: Surrey v New Zealand ====
20 June 1984
Scorecard

New Zealand; 150 (73.3 overs)	v	Surrey; 122/8 (44 overs)
Karen Plummer 32 (–); Joanne Gaydon 3/23 (17.3 overs)		Jan Brittin 35 (–); Sue Rattray 4/25 (10 overs)

Match drawn
Recreation Ground, Banstead
Umpires: Janet Burns (Eng) and Sheila Keen (Eng)

- New Zealand Women won the toss and elected to bat.

==== 50-over match: Sussex v New Zealand ====
22 June 1984
Scorecard

Sussex; 115/6 (50 overs)	v	New Zealand; 118 (35.1 overs)
Shirley Hodges 36 (–); Karen Plummer 2/15 (6 overs)		Nicki Turner 74* (–)

New Zealand Women won by 10 wickets
Central Recreation Ground, Hastings
Umpires: Janet Burns (Eng) and Esme Irwin (Eng)

- New Zealand Women won the toss and elected to field.

==== 1-day single innings match: East Anglia v New Zealand ====
26 June 1984
Scorecard

New Zealand; 182/4d (60.5 overs)	v	East Anglia; 37 (38.1 overs)
Jeanette Dunning 81 (–); Jean Wright 1/14 (8 overs)		Jacqueline Wainwright 14 (–); Shona Gilchrist 4/0 (9 overs)

New Zealand Women won by 145 runs
London Road, Tring
Umpires: Pip Vyvyan (Eng) and Judith West (Eng)

- East Anglia Women won the toss and elected to field.

==== 1-day single innings match: East Midlands v New Zealand ====
28 June 1984
Scorecard

New Zealand; 222/8d (61.2 overs)	v	East Midlands; 100/2 (52 overs)
Nicki Turner 50 (–); Enid Bakewell 2/52 (19.2 overs)		Enid Bakewell 57 (–); Sue Brown 1/13 (9 overs)

Match drawn
Leicester University Sports Ground, Leicester

- East Midlands Women won the toss and elected to field.

==== 55-over match: Yorkshire v New Zealand ====
3 July 1984
Scorecard

New Zealand; 224/6d (55 overs)	v	Yorkshire; 111 (55 overs)
Debbie Hockley 115* (127); Sue Metcalfe 1/32 (11 overs)		Ruth Limeburn 50 (83); Sue Brown 4/21 (11 overs)

New Zealand Women won by 113 runs
Leyburn Road, Bedale
Umpires: E Long (Eng) and Sally Marshall (Eng)

- Yorkshire Women won the toss and elected to field.

==== 1-day single innings match: Yorkshire, Lancashire and Cheshire v New Zealand ====
4 July 1984
Scorecard

New Zealand; 175/8d (66.3 overs)	v	Yorkshire, Lancashire and Cheshire; 135/8 (55 overs)
Rose Signal 55* (133); Janet Tedstone 3/30 (15 overs)		Janet Tedstone 42* (81); Liz Signal 3/33 (11 overs)

Match drawn
College Grove, Wakefield
Umpires: E Long (Eng) and Sally Marshall (Eng)

- New Zealand Women won the toss and elected to bat.

==== 1-day single innings match: Women's Cricket Association President's XI v New Zealand ====
11 July 1984
Scorecard

New Zealand; 183/6d (64 overs)	v	Women's Cricket Association President's XI; 125/7 (43 overs)
Jackie Clark 58 (–); Jill Stockdale 3/27 (9 overs)		Jill Stockdale 31* (–); Linda Fraser 4/25 (13 overs)

Match drawn
Church Lane, Mobberley
Umpires: Sheila Keen (Eng) and Pip Vyvyan (Eng)

- New Zealand Women won the toss and elected to bat.

==== 1-day single innings match: West Midlands v New Zealand ====
19 July 1984
Scorecard

West Midlands; 86 (46.1 overs)	v	New Zealand; 88/5 (36.3 overs)
Tracy Britton 26 (92); Liz Signal 5/26 (12.1 overs)		Ingrid Jagersma 31 (74); Margaret Leath 3/25 (13.3 overs)

New Zealand Women won by 5 wickets
Wolverhampton Cricket Club Ground, Wolverhampton
Umpires: E Cull (Eng) and K Freeman (Eng)

- West Midlands Women won the toss and elected to bat.

==== 15-over match: West Midlands v New Zealand ====
19 July 1984
Scorecard

New Zealand; 71/3 (15 overs)	v	West Midlands; 68/9 (15 overs)
Debbie Hockley 19 (12); Sandra Martin 1/8 (3 overs)		Wendy Williams 14 (25); Liz Signal 2/13 (3 overs)

New Zealand Women won by 3 runs
Wolverhampton Cricket Club Ground, Wolverhampton
Umpires: E Cull (Eng) and K Freeman (Eng)

- Toss not known.
- After the previous 1-day match between the two sides finished early, this match was scheduled to use the remaining time.

==== 2-day match: West of England v New Zealand ====
23 – 24 July 1984
Scorecard

West of England	v	New Zealand
167/3d (57.2 overs); Julia Goodwin 80 (–); Debbie Hockley 1/21 (5 overs)		152/4d (36.1 overs); Jackie Clark 50* (–); Sarah Potter 2/41 (11.1 overs)
77 (42 overs); Pauline Black 15* (–); Liz Signal 4/19 (10 overs)		95/1 (24 overs); Ann McKenna 60* (–); Margaret Frost 1/26 (6 overs)

New Zealand Women won by 9 wickets
Combe Park, Bath
Umpires: David Fardell (Eng) and Judith West (Eng)

- West of England Women won the toss and elected to bat.

==== 1-day single innings match: Kent v New Zealand ====
1 August 1984
Scorecard

New Zealand; 204/3d (56 overs)	v	Kent; 141/4 (51 overs)
Jackie Clark 66 (–); Angie Bainbridge 2/58 (16 overs)		Anne Stuart 49* (–); Rose Signal 1/13 (6 overs)

Match drawn
Crabble Athletic Ground, Dover
Umpires: Sheila Hill (Eng) and Pip Vyvyan (Eng)

- Kent Women won the toss and elected to field.

==== 2-day match: Young England v New Zealand ====
4 – 5 August 1984
Scorecard

Young England	v	New Zealand

Match Abandoned
Fenner's, Cambridge

- No toss.

=== Netherlands ===
==== 55-over match: Women's Cricket Association v New Zealand ====
10 August 1984
Scorecard

Women's Cricket Association; 121/8 (55 overs)	v	New Zealand; 124/5 (45.2 overs)
Barbara Daniels 51 (120); Shona Gilchrist 3/15 (11 overs)		Di Caird 34 (99); Barbara Daniels 1/5 (1 over)

New Zealand Women won by 5 wickets
Sportpark Crailoo, Hilversum
Umpires: C Boonen (Net) and Willem Molenaar (Net)

- New Zealand Women won the toss and elected to field.

== WODI Series ==
=== 1st ODI ===
24 June 1984
Scorecard

England; 194/8 (55 overs)	v	New Zealand; 148/7 (55 overs)
Jan Brittin 101 (–); Linda Fraser 2/23 (11 overs)		Debbie Hockley 51 (–); Avril Starling 3/18 (11 overs)

New Zealand Women won by 46 runs
Central Recreation Ground, Hastings
Umpires: Janet Burns (Eng) and Anne Garton (Eng)

- England Women won the toss and elected to bat.
- June Edney, Sarah Potter, Jane Powell (Eng), Di Caird, Jeanette Dunning, Ann McKenna and Rose Signal (NZ) all made their WODI debuts.

=== 2nd ODI ===
30 June 1984
Scorecard

New Zealand; 149/7 (53 overs)	v	England; 151/4 (45.5 overs)
Ann McKenna 37 (132); Janet Tedstone 2/29 (10 overs)		Jan Brittin 88* (148); Linda Fraser 3/27 (11 overs)

England Women won by 6 wickets
Grace Road, Leicester
Umpires: Esme Irwin (Eng) and Jane Ayres (Eng)

- England Women won the toss and elected to field.
- Match reduced to 53 overs per side due to rain.
- Liz Signal (NZ) made her WODI debut.

=== 3rd ODI ===
21 July 1984
Scorecard

England; 222/4 (54 overs)	v	New Zealand; 167/6 (54 overs)
Jan Southgate 82 (113); Shona Gilchrist 1/32 (10 overs)		Sue Rattray 60* (69); Gillian McConway 2/32 (11 overs)

England Women won by 55 runs
County Ground, Bristol
Umpires: June Bragger (Eng) and Veronica Reichwald (Eng)

- England Women won the toss and elected to bat.
- Match reduced to 54 overs per side due to rain.
- Shona Gilchrist (NZ) made her WODI debut.

== WTest Series ==
=== 1st Test ===
6 – 8 July 1984
Scorecard

New Zealand	v	England
147/7d (100.5 overs); Ann McKenna 51 (299); Janet Tedstone 3/26 (13 overs)		256/5d (96 overs); Jan Brittin 144* (304); Linda Fraser 2/61 (28 overs)
194/8 (124 overs); Jeanette Dunning 71 (180); Carole Hodges 2/25 (28 overs)

Match drawn
Headingley, Leeds
Umpires: June Bragger (Eng) and Valerie Gibbens (Eng)

- New Zealand Women won the toss and elected to bat.
- June Edney, Carole Hodges, Gillian McConway, Sue Metcalfe, Avril Starling, Janet Tedstone (Eng), Jeanette Dunning, Linda Fraser, Ingrid Jagersma, Karen Plummer, Liz Signal, Rose Signal and Nicki Turner (NZ) all made their WTest debuts.

=== 2nd Test ===
14 – 17 July 1984
Scorecard

New Zealand	v	England
225/6d (95 overs); Sue Rattray 57* (90); Gillian McConway 2/20 (15 overs)		271/6d (98.4 overs); Jan Brittin 96 (188); Shona Gilchrist 3/42 (16.4 overs)
311/7 (140 overs); Jackie Clark 79 (186); Avril Starling 3/37 (20 overs)

Match drawn
County Ground, Worcester
Umpires: Anne Garton (Eng) and Pip Vyvyan (Eng)

- England Women won the toss and elected to field.
- Jackie Clark and Shona Gilchrist (NZ) both made their WTest debuts.

=== 3rd Test ===
27 – 29 July 1984
Scorecard

England	v	New Zealand
214/7d (79.3 overs); Jan Brittin 63 (169); Liz Signal 2/34 (8 overs)		239/4d (92.3 overs); Debbie Hockley 107* (241); Carole Hodges 1/26 (7 overs)
297/5d (101 overs); Carole Hodges 158* (323); Shona Gilchrist 2/41 (15 overs)		145/4 (55 overs); Debbie Hockley 62 (111); Jan Brittin 1/15 (7 overs)

Match drawn
St Lawrence Ground, Canterbury
Umpires: Sheila Hill (Eng) and Veronica Reichwald (Eng)

- England Women won the toss and elected to bat.
- Sarah Potter, Jane Powell, Jill Stockdale and Helen Stother (Eng) all made their WTest debuts.

== Only ODI: Netherlands v New Zealand ==
8 August 1984
Scorecard

New Zealand; 184/6 (55 overs)	v	Netherlands; 117/9 (55 overs)
Di Caird 45 (–); Cor van der Flier 4/24 (11 overs)		Anita van Lier 45 (–); Rose Signal 1/10 (6 overs)

New Zealand Women won by 67 runs
Sportpark Koninklijke HFC, Haarlem
Umpires: Gerrit Gordinou de Gouberville (Net) and Willem Molenaar (Net)

- New Zealand Women won the toss and elected to bat.
- Mickey de Boer, Chantal Grevers, Saskia Keijzer-Klein, Dorine Loman, Barbara Meihuizen, Lonneke Offenberg, Irene Schoof, Cor van der Flier, Anita van Lier and Liesbeth Vernout (Net) all made their WODI debuts.
