= New Zealand women's cricket team in Australia in 1984–85 =

New Zealand women's cricket team

	Australia	New Zealand
- Dates: 7 – 10 February 1985
Captains	Denise Emerson	Debbie Hockley

One Day International series
- Results: Australia won the 3-match series 2–1
Most runs	Denise Emerson (154)	Debbie Hockley (88)
Most wickets	Lyn Fullston (8)	Karen Gunn (3)

The New Zealand women's national cricket team toured Australia in February 1985. They played against Australia in three One Day Internationals, which were to contest the Rose Bowl. Australia won the series 2–1.

== Squads ==
Australia	New Zealand
Denise Emerson (c); Denise Annetts; Karen Brown; Leonie Callaghan; Judy Esmond (wk); Lyn Fullston; Sally Griffiths; Lee-Anne Hunter; Lyn Larsen; Wendy Napier; Karen Price; Karen Read	Debbie Hockley (c); Jackie Clark; Delwyn Costello; Jeanette Dunning; Shona Gilchrist; Karen Gunn; Ingrid Jagersma (wk); Ann McKenna; Katrina Molloy; Sue Rattray; Liz Signal; Lois Simpson; Nancy Williams

== WODI Series ==
=== 1st ODI ===
7 February 1985
Scorecard

New Zealand; 58 (56.3 overs)	v	Australia; 59/1 (27 overs)
Jeanette Dunning 20 (–); Lyn Fullston 4/19 (12 overs)		Denise Annetts 26* (–); Jeanette Dunning 1/10 (4 overs)

Australia Women won by 9 wickets
Aberfeldie Park, Melbourne
Umpires: A Crawley (Aus) and E Jackson (Aus)

- Australia Women won the toss and elected to field.
- Denise Annetts, Karen Brown, Leonie Callaghan, Judy Esmond, Lee-Anne Hunter (Aus), Jackie Clark, Delwyn Costello, Karen Gunn and Lois Simpson (NZ) all made their WODI debuts.

=== 2nd ODI ===
8 February 1985
Scorecard

Australia; 155 (59.5 overs)	v	New Zealand; 156/5 (59 overs)
Denise Emerson 54 (–); Shona Gilchrist 2/26 (12 overs)		Debbie Hockley 72* (–); Sally Griffiths 3/17 (9 overs)

New Zealand Women won by 5 wickets
Aberfeldie Park, Melbourne

- New Zealand Women won the toss and elected to field.
- Sally Griffiths (Aus) made her WODI debut.

=== 3rd ODI ===
10 February 1985
Scorecard

Australia; 214/7 (60 overs)	v	New Zealand; 106 (54.2 overs)
Denise Emerson 75 (–); Karen Gunn 2/40 (11 overs)		Sue Rattray 24 (–); Karen Brown 3/21 (8 overs)

Australia Women won by 108 runs
Aberfeldie Park, Melbourne
Umpires: Daniel Bomford (Aus) and Graeme Bugge (Aus)

- Australia Women won the toss and elected to bat.
- Katrina Molloy and Nancy Williams (NZ) both made their WODI debuts.
