= Australia women's cricket team in New Zealand in 1985–86 =

Australian women's cricket team

	New Zealand	Australia
- Dates: 20 – 25 January 1986
Captains	Lesley Murdoch	Lyn Larsen

One Day International series
- Results: 3-match series drawn 1–1
Most runs	Jackie Clark (176)	Belinda Haggett (83)
Most wickets	Sue Brown (4)	Lyn Fullston (4)

The Australia women's national cricket team toured New Zealand in January 1986. They played against New Zealand in three One Day Internationals, which were competed for the Rose Bowl. The series was drawn 1–1 after the final match ended as a no result due to rain.

== Squads ==
New Zealand	Australia
Lesley Murdoch (c); Sue Brown; Jackie Clark; Jeanette Dunning; Linda Fraser; Karen Gunn; Debbie Hockley; Ingrid Jagersma (wk); Liz Signal; Nicki Turner; Nancy Williams	Lyn Larsen (c); Denise Annetts; Karen Brown; Ruth Buckstein; Lyn Fullston; Belinda Haggett; Sharlene Heywood; Frances Leonard; Christina Matthews (wk); Karen Price; Karen Read; Lindsay Reeler; Debbie Wilson

== WODI Series ==
=== 1st ODI ===
20 January 1986
Scorecard

Australia; 211/6 (60 overs)	v	New Zealand; 207/9 (60 overs)
Denise Annetts 57 (–); Sue Brown 2/37 (12 overs)		Jackie Clark 81 (–); Lyn Fullston 2/36 (12 overs)

Australia Women won by 4 runs
Basin Reserve, Wellington
Umpires: Stan Cowman (NZ) and Diana Malthus (NZ)

- Australia Women won the toss and elected to bat.
- Belinda Haggett and Sharlene Heywood (Aus) both made their WODI debuts.

=== 2nd ODI ===
23 January 1986
Scorecard

Australia; 171 (59.3 overs)	v	New Zealand; 172/5 (58.2 overs)
Belinda Haggett 33 (–); Karen Gunn 2/13 (12 overs)		Jackie Clark 59 (–); Lyn Fullston 2/32 (12 overs)

New Zealand Women won by 5 wickets
Hutt Recreation Ground, Lower Hutt
Umpires: Bob Bradley (NZ) and Sue Wardill (NZ)

- Australia Women won the toss and elected to bat.
- Ruth Buckstein and Frances Leonard (Aus) both made their WODI debuts.

=== 3rd ODI ===
25 January 1986
Scorecard

New Zealand; 60/1 (17 overs)	v	Australia
Jackie Clark 36* (–); Debbie Wilson 1/22 (4 overs)

No result
Lancaster Park, Christchurch

- Australia Women won the toss and elected to field.
- No further play possible due to rain.
