= New Zealand women's cricket team in Australia in 1978–79 =

	Australia	New Zealand
- Dates: 7 January – 1 February 1979
Captains	Sharon Tredrea	Trish McKelvey

Test series
- Result: Australia won the 3-match series 1–0
Most runs	Julie Stockton (162)	Lesley Murdoch (183)
Most wickets	Sharon Tredrea (16)	Jackie Lord (18)

The New Zealand women's national cricket team toured Australia in January and February 1979. They played against Australia in three Test matches, with Australia winning the series 1–0.

== Squads ==
Australia	New Zealand
Sharon Tredrea (c); Marie Cornish; Sharyn Hill; Wendy Hills; Jen Jacobs; Jill Kennare; Judith Laing; Debbie Martin; Julie Stockton (wk); Raelee Thompson; Peta Verco; Wendy Weir	Trish McKelvey (c); Eileen Badham; Barbara Bevege; Sue Brown; Vicki Burtt; Debbie Hockley; Jackie Lord; Carol Marett; Ev Miller; Lesley Murdoch; Sue Rattray; Edna Ryan (wk)

== Tour Matches ==
=== 40-over match: New South Wales Junior v New Zealand ===
7 January 1979
Scorecard

New South Wales Junior; 63 (29 overs)	v	New Zealand; 87 (32.4 overs)
M Wykes 20 (–); Carol Marett 2/3 (4 overs)		Vicki Burtt 24 (–); Lyn Larsen 3/8 (6.4 overs)

New Zealand Women won by 7 wickets
St Andrew's Cricket Ground, Sydney

- New Zealand Women won the toss and elected to field.
- New Zealand Women batted on after winning.

=== 2-day match: Western Australia v New Zealand ===
8 – 9 January 1979
Scorecard

New Zealand	v	Australia
213/7d (93 overs); Barbara Bevege 56 (–); Wendy Hills 4/35 (27 overs)		191 (90.6 overs); Rhonda Kendall 72 (–); Eileen Badham 6/33 (25.6 overs)

Match drawn
University Oval, Sydney

- New Zealand Women won the toss and elected to bat.

=== 40-over match: South Australia v New Zealand ===
17 January 1979
Scorecard

New Zealand; 107/7 (40 overs)	v	Australia; 106 (39.7 overs)
Barbara Bevege 34 (–); Jill Need 2/18 (5 overs)		K Virgo 25 (–); Eileen Badham 4/36 (14.7 overs)

New Zealand Women won by 1 run
Women's Memorial Playing Fields, Adelaide

- South Australia Women won the toss and elected to field.

=== 45-over match: Victoria Women's Cricket Association President's XI v New Zealand ===
24 January 1979
Scorecard

Victoria Women's Cricket Association President's XI; 144/5 (45 overs)	v	New Zealand; 200/6 (45 overs)
Pat O'Meara 61 (–); Carol Marett 3/44 (9 overs)		Barbara Bevege 63 (–); Glenis Brown 3/45 (12 overs)

New Zealand Women won by 8 wickets
Monash University No. 1 Oval, Melbourne

- New Zealand Women won the toss and elected to field.
- New Zealand Women batted on after winning.

=== 2-day match: Victoria v New Zealand ===
31 January – 1 February 1979
Scorecard

New Zealand	v	Australia
194 (72.3 overs); Sue Rattray 59 (–); B Crouch 6/39 (12.3 overs)		147 (73.5 overs); Ruth Buckstein 36 (–); Eileen Badham 6/30 (22 overs)
90/5 (35 overs); Debbie Hockley 29 (–); B Crouch 2/27 (8 overs)

Match drawn
AG Gillon Oval, Melbourne
Umpires: FA Clodd (Aus) and Terence Meehan (Aus)

- Victoria Women won the toss and elected to bat.

== WTest Series ==
=== 1st Test ===
12 – 15 January 1979
Scorecard

New Zealand	v	Australia
254 (111.4 overs); Carol Marett 49 (–); Wendy Weir 3/46 (12 overs)		282/8d (94.5 overs); Julie Stockton 117 (–); Jackie Lord 3/103 (28.5 overs)
256 (107.5 overs); Barbara Bevege 81 (–); Raelee Thompson 3/37 (23 overs)

Match drawn
University Oval, Sydney
Umpires: Austin Chapman (Aus) and Alan Marshall (Aus)

- New Zealand Women won the toss and elected to bat.
- Sharyn Hill, Jill Kennare, Judith Laing, Debbie Martin, Julie Stockton (Aus), Eileen Badham, Sue Brown, Ev Miller and Lesley Murdoch (NZ) all made their WTest debuts.

=== 2nd Test ===
19 – 22 January 1979
Scorecard

New Zealand	v	Australia
78 (57 overs); Lesley Murdoch 16 (–); Raelee Thompson 4/14 (17 overs)		239 (81.5 overs); Wendy Hills 48 (–); Jackie Lord 5/78 (18.5 overs)
87 (43.5 overs); Ev Miller 32 (–); Raelee Thompson 4/17 (14 overs)

Australia Women won by an innings and 74 runs
Unley Oval, Adelaide
Umpires: Tony Crafter (Aus) and P Remington (Aus)

- New Zealand Women won the toss and elected to bat.
- Jen Jacobs (Aus) made her WTest debut.

=== 3rd Test ===
26 – 29 January 1979
Scorecard

Australia	v	New Zealand
129 (66.5 overs); Sharon Tredrea 36 (–); Jackie Lord 4/18 (10 overs)		277 (119.3 overs); Lesley Murdoch 72 (–); Sharon Tredrea 3/90 (29 overs)
311 (124.4 overs); Judith Laing 84 (–); Jackie Lord 6/119 (45.4 overs)		88/8 (69 overs); Lesley Murdoch 29 (–); Sharyn Hill 2/17 (12 overs)

Match drawn
Albert Cricket Ground, Melbourne
Umpires: Bill Copeland (Aus) and Rex Whitehead (Aus)

- Australia Women won the toss and elected to bat.
- Debbie Hockley (NZ) made her WTest debut.
