= Australia women's cricket team in New Zealand in 1993–94 =

	New Zealand	Australia
- Dates: 18 January – 22 January 1994
Captains	Sarah Illingworth	Belinda Clark

One Day International series
- Results: New Zealand won the 3-match series 2–1
Most runs	Emily Drumm (91)	Zoe Goss (99)
Most wickets	Emily Drumm (8)	Zoe Goss (9)

The Australia women's national cricket team toured New Zealand in January 1994. They played against New Zealand in three One Day Internationals, which were competed for the Rose Bowl. New Zealand won the series 2–1.

== Squads ==
New Zealand	Australia
Sarah Illingworth (c) (wk); Trudy Anderson; Catherine Campbell; Emily Drumm; Kirsty Flavell; Julie Harris; Debbie Hockley; Penny Kinsella; Maia Lewis; Sarah McLauchlan; Karen Musson; Jennifer Turner	Belinda Clark (c); Sharyn Bow; Kim Bradley; Joanne Broadbent; Bronwyn Calver; Julie Calvert; Cathryn Fitzpatrick; Zoe Goss; Sally Griffiths; Lee-Anne Hunter; Lyn Larsen; Christina Matthews (wk); Caroline Ward

== WODI Series ==
=== 1st ODI ===
18 January 1994
Scorecard

Australia; 138/9 (50 overs)	v	New Zealand; 139/7 (47.4 overs)
Zoe Goss 51 (106); Emily Drumm 4/31 (10 overs)		Debbie Hockley 50 (102); Zoe Goss 3/30 (10 overs)

New Zealand Women won by 3 wickets
Eden Park, Auckland
Umpires: Mike Brooks (NZ) and Peter Wright (NZ)

- Australia Women won the toss and elected to bat.

=== 2nd ODI ===
20 January 1994
Scorecard

Australia; 163/8 (50 overs)	v	New Zealand; 120 (46.4 overs)
Belinda Clark 35 (77); Emily Drumm 2/16 (8 overs)		Penny Kinsella 38 (67); Sharyn Bow 3/17 (10 overs)

Australia Women won by 43 runs
Levin Domain, Levin
Umpires: Bryan Malin (NZ) and Kevin Kerr (NZ)

- New Zealand Women won the toss and elected to field.
- Kim Bradley and Caroline Ward (Aus) both made their WODI debuts.

=== 3rd ODI ===
22 January 1994
Scorecard

New Zealand; 183/9 (50 overs)	v	Australia; 181 (49 overs)
Emily Drumm 51 (51); Zoe Goss 3/26 (5 overs)		Zoe Goss 44 (82); Julie Harris 4/33 (10 overs)

New Zealand Women won by 2 runs
Basin Reserve, Wellington
Umpires: Bill Sommer (NZ) and Doug Davies (NZ)

- New Zealand Women won the toss and elected to bat.
