= Jody Davis =

Jody Davis is the name of:

- Jody Davis (baseball) (born 1956), former baseball player for the Chicago Cubs (1981–1988) and Atlanta Braves (1989–1990), later a manager
- Jody Davis (musician), guitarist for the Christian pop rock band The Newsboys

== See also ==
- Jodie Davis, cricketer
