= Judith Laing =

Australian cricketer

Personal information
- Full name: Judith Laing
- Born: 27 May 1957 (age 69); Darlinghurst, Sydney, Australia
- Batting: Right-handed
- Bowling: Left-arm medium
- Role: All-rounder

International information
- National side: Australia (1979)
- Test debut (cap 92): 12 January 1979 v New Zealand
- Last Test: 26 January 1979 v New Zealand

Domestic team information
- Years: Team
- 1974/75–1981/82: New South Wales

Career statistics
Competition	WTest	WFC	WLA
Matches	3	18	17
Runs scored	119	540	260
Batting average	29.75	28.42	17.33
100s/50s	0/1	0/2	0/0
Top score	84	90	33
Balls bowled	168	531	214
Wickets	1	10	3
Bowling average	69.00	21.30	26.66
5 wickets in innings	0	0	0
10 wickets in match	0	0	0
Best bowling	1/23	2/5	2/15
Catches/stumpings	5/–	11/–	2/–
- Source: CricketArchive, 3 February 2023

Judith Laing (born 27 May 1957) is an Australian former cricketer who played as an all-rounder, batting right-handed and bowling left-arm medium. She appeared in three Test matches for Australia, all during their series against New Zealand in 1979. She played domestic cricket for New South Wales.
