= Helen Daly =

New Zealand cricketer (born 1976)

Personal information
- Full name: Helen Rachel Daly
- Born: 26 May 1976 (age 50); Hamilton, New Zealand
- Batting: Right-handed
- Bowling: Left-arm medium
- Role: Bowler

International information
- National side: New Zealand (1996–1997)
- Only Test (cap 111): 24 June 1996 v England
- ODI debut (cap 68): 28 January 1997 v Pakistan
- Last ODI: 23 February 1997 v Australia

Domestic team information
- Years: Team
- 1993/94: North Harbour
- 1995/96: Central Districts
- 1996/97–2004/05: Canterbury

Career statistics
Competition	WTest	WODI	WFC	WLA
Matches	1	3	8	50
Runs scored	–	–	8	48
Batting average	–	–	1.33	6.00
100s/50s	–	–	0/0	0/0
Top score	–	–	4*	11*
Balls bowled	96	120	1,134	2,361
Wickets	0	2	15	59
Bowling average	–	28.50	31.06	17.11
5 wickets in innings	0	0	0	1
10 wickets in match	0	0	0	0
Best bowling	–	1/12	4/64	5/19
Catches/stumpings	0/–	1/–	1/–	10/–
- Source: CricketArchive, 20 April 2021

Helen Rachel Daly (born 26 May 1976) is a New Zealand former cricketer who played as a left-arm medium bowler. She appeared in 1 Test match and 3 One Day Internationals for New Zealand between 1996 and 1997. She played domestic cricket for North Harbour, Central Districts and Canterbury.
