= Australia women's cricket team in New Zealand in 2008–09 =

	New Zealand	Australia
- Dates: 1 – 12 February 2009
Captains	Haidee Tiffen	Karen Rolton

One Day International series
- Results: 5-match series drawn 2–2
Most runs	Amy Satterthwaite	Shelley Nitschke (144)
Most wickets	Suzie Bates (6)	Emma Sampson (6)

The Australia women's national cricket team toured New Zealand in February 2009. They played against New Zealand in five One Day Internationals, which were competed for the Rose Bowl. The series was drawn 2–2 after the final match was abandoned due to rain.

== Squads ==
New Zealand	Australia
Haidee Tiffen (c); Suzie Bates; Nicola Browne; Abby Burrows; Sophie Devine; Lucy Doolan; Katey Martin (wk); Sara McGlashan; Beth McNeill; Rachel Priest (wk); Kate Pulford; Amy Satterthwaite; Sarah Tsukigawa; Aimee Watkins	Karen Rolton (c); Sarah Andrews; Alex Blackwell; Leonie Coleman (wk); Jess Duffin; Lauren Ebsary; Rene Farrell; Jodie Fields (wk); Delissa Kimmince; Shelley Nitschke; Erin Osborne; Ellyse Perry; Leah Poulton; Emma Sampson; Lisa Sthalekar

== WODI Series ==
=== 1st ODI ===
1 February 2009
Scorecard

Australia; 150/8 (50 overs)	v	New Zealand; 151/8 (45.4 overs)
Jodie Fields 52 (94); Abby Burrows 2/15 (7 overs)		Amy Satterthwaite 49* (91); Rene Farrell 3/26 (8 overs)

New Zealand Women won by 2 wickets
Cobham Oval, Whangārei
Umpires: Billy Bowden (NZ) and Derek Walker (NZ)
Player of the match: Amy Satterthwaite (NZ)

- New Zealand Women won the toss and elected to field.
- Jess Duffin, Erin Osborne (Aus) and Abby Burrows (NZ) all made their WODI debuts.

=== 2nd ODI ===
3 February 2009
Scorecard

New Zealand; 218/7 (50 overs)	v	Australia; 214/9 (50 overs)
Haidee Tiffen 64* (103); Lisa Sthalekar 2/40 (10 overs)		Lisa Sthalekar 72 (116); Suzie Bates 3/40 (10 overs)

New Zealand Women won by 4 runs
Cobham Oval, Whangārei
Umpires: Barry Frost (NZ) and Gary Baxter (NZ)
Player of the match: Suzie Bates (NZ)

- New Zealand Women won the toss and elected to bat.

=== 3rd ODI ===
6 February 2009 (D/N)
Scorecard

Australia; 258/8 (50 overs)	v	New Zealand; 154 (39.5 overs)
Shelley Nitschke 73 (85); Nicola Browne 2/51 (10 overs)		Aimee Watkins 34 (32); Lisa Sthalekar 3/16 (7.5 overs)

Australia Women won by 104 runs
Seddon Park, Hamilton
Umpires: Evan Watkin (NZ) and Phil Jones (NZ)
Player of the match: Shelley Nitschke (Aus)

- New Zealand Women won the toss and elected to field.

=== 4th ODI ===
8 February 2009
Scorecard

Australia; 307/9 (50 overs)	v	New Zealand; 263 (48 overs)
Lauren Ebsary 86 (76); Beth McNeill 2/52 (10 overs)		Amy Satterthwaite 67 (76); Emma Sampson 3/34 (6 overs)

Australia Women won by 44 runs
Seddon Park, Hamilton
Umpires: Dave Quested (NZ) and Evan Watkin (NZ)
Player of the match: Lauren Ebsary (Aus)

- Australia Women won the toss and elected to bat.

=== 5th ODI ===
12 February 2009
Scorecard

New Zealand	v	Australia

Match Abandoned
Basin Reserve, Wellington
Umpires: Billy Bowden (NZ) and Chris Gaffaney (NZ)

- No toss.
- No play possible due to rain.
