= Vera Burt =

New Zealand cricketer

Vera Burt MBE
- Born: Vera Esther Robinson; 14 January 1927; Pātea, New Zealand
- Died: 21 September 2017 (aged 90); Takapuna, New Zealand
- Spouse: Halstead Burt
- Children: 3
- Cricket career

Cricket information
- Batting: Right-handed
- Bowling: Slow left-arm orthodox
- Role: All-rounder

International information
- National side: New Zealand (1948–1969)
- Test debut (cap 13): 20 March 1948 v Australia
- Last Test: 15 February 1969 v England

Domestic team information
- Years: Team
- 1944/45–1960/61: Auckland
- 1965/66–1970/71: North Shore

Career statistics
Competition	WTest	WFC
Matches	3	44
Runs scored	40	1,871
Batting average	8.00	31.18
100s/50s	0/0	0/13
Top score	15	84
Balls bowled	42	955
Wickets	0	31
Bowling average	–	17.51
5 wickets in innings	0	0
10 wickets in match	0	0
Best bowling	–	3/5
Catches/stumpings	0/–	7/–
- Source: CricketArchive, 28 November 2021

Vera Esther Burt MBE (née Robinson; 14 January 1927 – 21 September 2017) was a New Zealand cricketer and field hockey player, representing her country in both sports. She went on to be hockey umpire, coach, and administrator.

== Early life and family ==
Burt was born in Pātea on 14 January 1927, and educated at Epsom Girls' Grammar School in Auckland. She studied at Auckland Teachers' Training College from 1944 to 1945, and then at Dunedin Teachers' College in 1946, becoming a physical education teacher. In 1952, she married Halstead Burt, and the couple went on to have three children.

== Sporting career ==
=== Cricket ===
Burt played as an all-rounder, batting right-handed and bowling slow left-arm orthodox. She played in three Test matches for New Zealand between 1948 and 1969. She played domestic cricket for Auckland and North Shore.

=== Hockey ===
Beginning her hockey career in Auckland in the mid-1940s, Burt then represented Otago briefly. She subsequently returned to Auckland and represented that province from 1947 to 1958. She gained national honours, playing for New Zealand against Australia in 1960.

Burt went on to be an umpire for 34 years, and was an A-grade international umpire during the 1970s. During the 1980s she served on the New Zealand Hockey Umpires' Council. She was also a successful coach, taking the North Shore women's hockey team to the K Cup title in 1978.

As an administrator, Burt served on the executive of the Auckland Women's Hockey Association for 21 years, and was instrumental in the establishment of the North Shore Women's Hockey Association in 1972.

== Honours and awards ==
Burt was made a life member of Auckland Hockey in 1983, the New Zealand Women's Hockey Association in 1985, the New Zealand Umpires' Federation in 1988, and the North Shore Women's Hockey Association, also in 1988.

In the 1990 New Year Honours, Burt was appointed a Member of the Order of the British Empire, for services to sport, especially women's hockey, and the community.

In 2009, Burt was an inaugural inductee into Harbour Sport's hall of fame.

== Death ==
Burt died at Takapuna on 21 September 2017.
