= North Harbour women's cricket team =

New Zealand women's cricket team

North Harbour Women
Team information
- Founded: 1990
- Dissolved: 1994

History
- First-class debut: Auckland in 1990 at Hagley Oval, Christchurch
- HBJS wins: 0

The North Harbour women's cricket team was the women's representative cricket team for the North Shore and Rodney District. From 1990–91 to 1993–94 they competed in the New Zealand Pub Charities National Tournament, replacing North Shore. The team merged with Auckland ahead of the 1994–95 season.

== History ==
North Harbour joined the New Zealand Pub Charities National Tournament in 1990–91, replacing North Shore. They finished bottom of the league in their first season, losing all five of their matches.

The following season, they recorded their first win, against Canterbury B, and finished 4th overall. They finished bottom of the group again in 1992–93, but recorded their best finish in 1993–94, placing joint-second in the league stage before losing the semi-final against eventual winners Canterbury.

Following that season, North Harbour merged with Auckland.

== Players ==
=== Notable players ===
Players who played for North Harbour and played internationally are listed below, in order of first international appearance (given in brackets):

- (New Zealand) Ingrid Jagersma (1984)
- (New Zealand) Maia Lewis (1992)
- (New Zealand) Clare Nicholson (1995)
- (New Zealand) Helen Daly (1996)

== Honours ==
- Hallyburton Johnstone Shield:
  - Winners (0):
  - Best finish: Semi-Final (1993–94)

== See also ==
- North Shore women's cricket team
- Auckland Hearts
