= North Shore women's cricket team =

New Zealand women's cricket team

North Shore Women
Team information
- Founded: Unknown First recorded match: 1965
- Dissolved: 1990
- Home ground: Devonport Domain, Devonport, Auckland

History
- First-class debut: Canterbury in 1965 at Melville Park, Auckland
- HBJS wins: 3

The North Shore women's cricket team was the women's representative cricket team for North Shore. They played their home games primarily at Devonport Domain, Devonport. From 1965–66 to 1989–90 they competed in the Hallyburton Johnstone Shield, and won the tournament three times. They were replaced in the competition by North Harbour, who in turn merged with Auckland.

== History ==
North Shore joined the Hallyburton Johnstone Shield in 1965–66, when the tournament was 2-day competition, finishing third out of five teams in their first year of competing. In 1968–69, they won their first title, topping the table with 3 wins from 4 games.

They went on to win the title two more times, two seasons in a row, in 1970–71 and 1971–72, winning three out of four and two out of four, respectively.

North Shore did not win the title again, but were runners-up to Canterbury in every season between 1983–84 and 1988–89. The following season, 1989–90, was their final season in existence, in which they finished fourth out of five. The following season, they were replaced by North Harbour, who eventually merged with Auckland ahead of the 1994–95 season.

== Grounds ==
North Shore's primary home ground throughout their time in existence was Devonport Domain in Devonport, Auckland, which they used from 1968–69 until their dissolution after the 1989–90 season. In the 1973–74 season, they used North Shore, Auckland as their only home ground. They also played various tourist matches at a ground in Stanley Bay, Auckland.

== Players ==
=== Notable players ===
Players who played for North Shore and played internationally are listed below, in order of first international appearance (given in brackets):

- (New Zealand) Vera Burt (1948)
- (New Zealand) Bev Brentnall (1966)
- (New Zealand) Jos Burley (1966)
- (New Zealand) Judi Doull (1966)
- (New Zealand) Jackie Lord (1966)
- (New Zealand) Carol Oyler (1966)
- (New Zealand) Pat Carrick (1969)
- (New Zealand) Liz Allan (1972)
- (New Zealand) Elaine White (1972)
- (New Zealand) Carol Marett (1972)
- (New Zealand) Eileen Badham (1973)
- (New Zealand) Sue Rattray (1973)
- (New Zealand) Ev Miller (1979)
- (New Zealand) Debbie Hockley (1979)
- (New Zealand) Karen Plummer (1982)
- (New Zealand) Linda Fraser (1982)
- (New Zealand) Chris Miller (1982)
- (New Zealand) Di Caird (1984)
- (New Zealand) Jeanette Dunning (1984)
- (New Zealand) Ingrid Jagersma (1984)
- (New Zealand) Lois Simpson (1985)
- (New Zealand) Katrina Molloy (1985)
- (New Zealand) Clare Nicholson (1995)

== Honours ==
- Hallyburton Johnstone Shield:
  - Winners (3): 1968–69, 1970–71, 1971–72

== See also ==
- North Harbour women's cricket team
- Auckland Hearts
