= Patsy Lovell =

English cricketer (1954–2024)

Patsy Lovell MBE
Personal information
- Full name: Patricia Ann Lovell
- Born: 3 May 1954; Croydon, Surrey, England
- Died: 27 April 2024 (aged 69)
- Batting: Right-handed
- Bowling: Right-arm off break
- Role: All-rounder

International information
- National side: England (1987–1988)
- ODI debut (cap 47): 25 July 1987 v Australia
- Last ODI: 18 December 1988 v Australia

Domestic team information
- Years: Team
- 1974–1999: Surrey

Career statistics
| Competition | WODI | WFC | WLA |
|---|---|---|---|
| Matches | 10 | 5 | 92 |
| Runs scored | 41 | 43 | 1,320 |
| Batting average | 6.83 | 6.14 | 22.37 |
| 100s/50s | 0/0 | 0/0 | 2/3 |
| Top score | 12 | 23 | 177 |
| Balls bowled | 444 | 514 | 4,925 |
| Wickets | 8 | 7 | 110 |
| Bowling average | 25.00 | 24.85 | 16.96 |
| 5 wickets in innings | 0 | 0 | 0 |
| 10 wickets in match | 0 | 0 | 0 |
| Best bowling | 3/15 | 3/8 | 4/18 |
| Catches/stumpings | 3/0 | 1/– | 24/0 |
Medal record
Women's cricket
Representing England
World Cup
| Runner-up | 1988 Australia |
- Source: CricketArchive, 13 March 2021

Patricia Ann "Patsy" Lovell MBE (3 May 1954 – 27 April 2024) was an English cricketer who played as an all-rounder. She was a right-arm off break bowler and right-handed batter. She appeared in 10 One Day Internationals (ODIs) for England, making her debut against Australia in July 1987. She played in all nine of England's matches in the 1988 Women's Cricket World Cup, including the final loss to Australia. Overall, she took eight wickets with a best of three for 15 and scored 41 runs in ODI cricket. Her final WODI appearance was in the final of the 1988 Women's Cricket World Cup. She played domestic cricket for Surrey.

In the 2006 Birthday Honours, Lovell was awarded an MBE for services to cricket. She died on 27 April 2024, at the age of 69.
