= Bev Brentnall =

New Zealand woman cricketer

Personal information
- Full name: Beverley Anne Brentnall
- Born: 21 February 1936 (age 90); Devonport, Auckland, New Zealand
- Batting: Right-handed
- Role: Wicket-keeper

International information
- National side: New Zealand (1966–1973)
- Test debut (cap 44): 18 June 1966 v England
- Last Test: 24 March 1972 v South Africa
- ODI debut (cap 2): 23 June 1973 v Trinidad and Tobago
- Last ODI: 21 July 1973 v Young England

Domestic team information
- Years: Team
- 1964: Middlesex
- 1965/66–1972/73: North Shore
- 1973/74: Southern Transvaal

Career statistics
Competition	WTest	WODI
Matches	10	5
Runs scored	301	40
Batting average	21.50	13.33
100s/50s	0/1	0/0
Top score	84*	18
Catches/stumpings	16/12	3/3
- Source: CricketArchive, 12 April 2021

Beverley Anne Brentnall (born 21 February 1936) is a New Zealand former cricketer who played as a wicket-keeper. She appeared in 10 Test matches and 5 One Day Internationals for New Zealand between 1966 and 1973. She was New Zealand's first ODI captain, leading them at the 1973 World Cup. Three of the five ODIs in which Brentnall captained were won by her team. She played domestic cricket for North Shore, as well as playing three matches for Middlesex in 1964 and playing in South Africa in the 1970s, including for Southern Transvaal.

== Career highlights ==
1966 tour to England. Conceded only 1 bye in the 3 Test series. Scored 84 not out, 2nd Test, 2nd innings at Edgbaston.

1969 v England at Auckland. 5 dismissals in an innings (3c 2st).

1972 v South Africa at Johannesburg. 6 dismissals in an innings (2c 4st).
