= Rose Bowl series =

Rose Bowl Series
- series trophy
- Format: Women's ODI
- First edition: 1985
- Latest edition: 2020
- Tournament format: Bilateral series
- Number of teams: 2
- Current champion: Australia
- Most successful: Australia (22 times)
- Most runs: (Australia) Belinda Clark (1967)
- Most wickets: (Australia) Cathryn Fitzpatrick (70)

The Rose Bowl series is a series of Women's One Day International cricket matches between Australia and New Zealand that has been running since February 1985. It was originally known as the Shell Rose Bowl; the name was changed to the Rose Bowl Series in 2001.

Until 2000, the tournament took place annually, with matches alternating between the two countries. However, since then the format has changed regularly. The most recent series, held in Australia, took place in late 2020 in Brisbane.

Australia has dominated the tournament, winning 22 series to New Zealand's three, and New Zealand have only won 4 of 36 matches in the 21st century. New Zealand's last series victory came in the 1998-99 cricket season, when they defeated Australia over three matches in Palmerston North in New Zealand. Their only series victory in Australia was achieved in 1987, when they won two of the three matches in Perth.

== Results summary ==
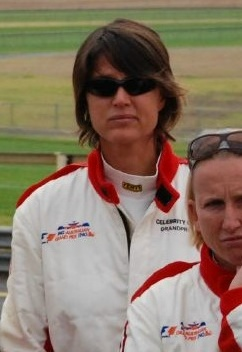
Zoe Goss, Australian cricketer

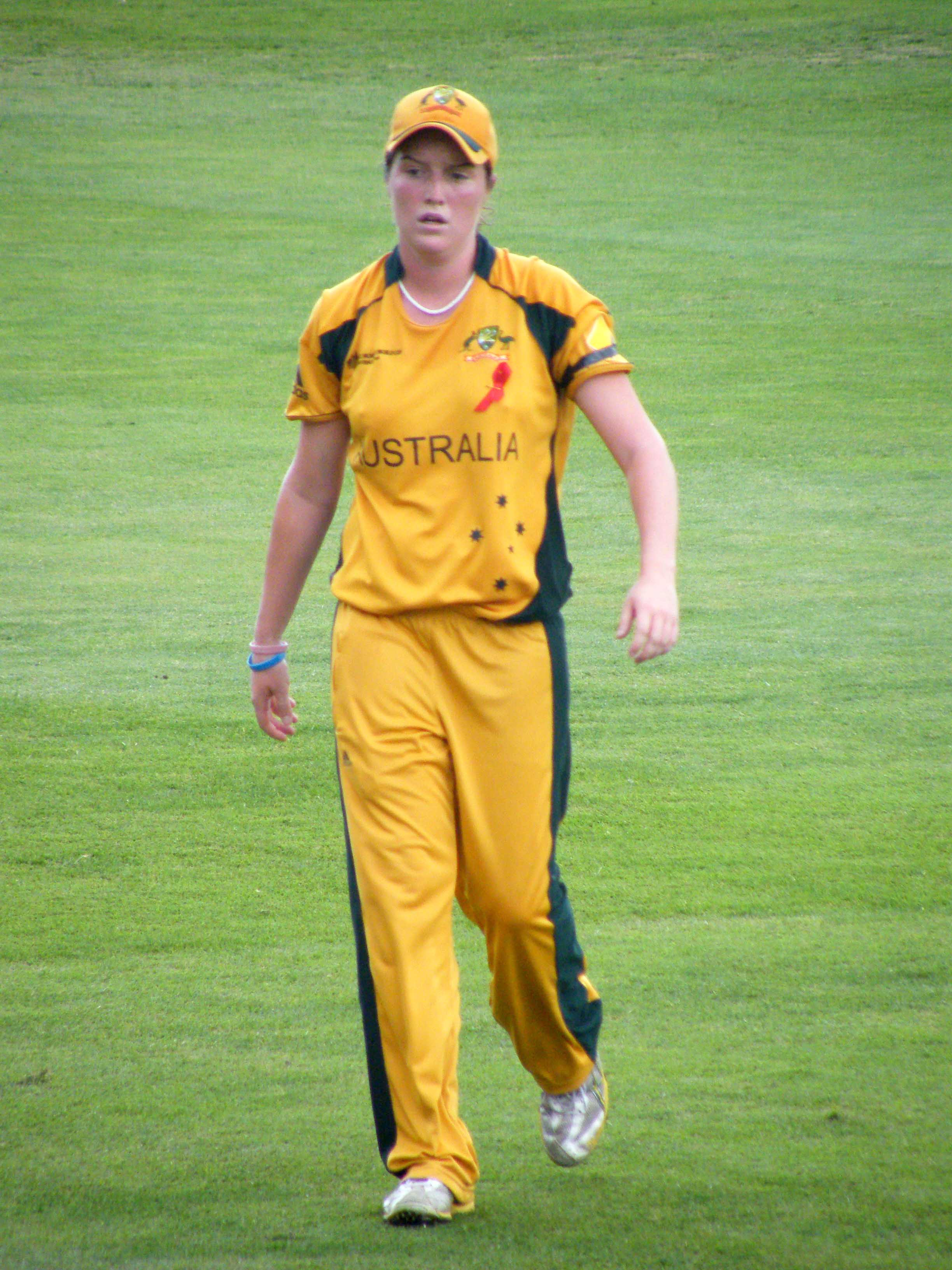
Rene Farrell, Australian bowler

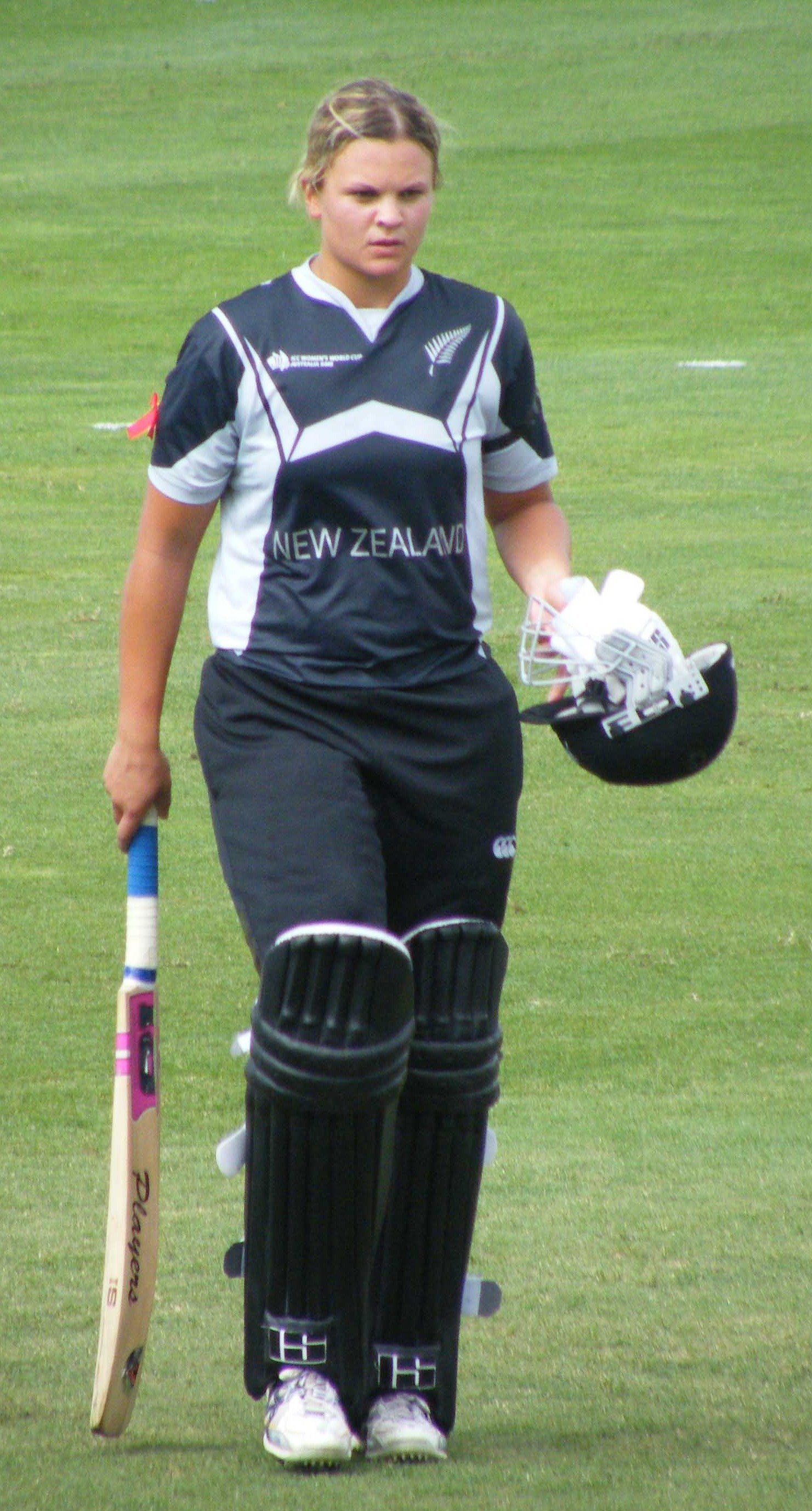
Suzie Bates, New Zealand cricketer

	Played	Won by Australia	Won by New Zealand	Drawn	No result
ODI matches	97	71	24	0	2
ODIs in Australia	53	41	11	0	1
ODIs in New Zealand	44	30	13	0	1
All Series	29	22	3	4	–
Series in Australia	15	13	1	1	–
Series in New Zealand	10	5	2	3	–
Series in both countries	4	4	0	0	–

== Series results ==
Series	Season	Played in	First Match	Winner	Series result	Match venue	Match result	Notes
1	1984–85	Australia	7 February 1985	Australia	2–1	Aberfeldie Park, Melbourne	Australia won by 9 wickets	
1	1984–85	Australia	7 February 1985	Australia	2–1	Aberfeldie Park, Melbourne	New Zealand won by 5 wickets	
1	1984–85	Australia	7 February 1985	Australia	2–1	Aberfeldie Park, Melbourne	Australia won by 108 runs	
2	1985–86	New Zealand	20 January 1986	Drawn	1–1	Basin Reserve, Wellington	Australia won by 4 runs	
2	1985–86	New Zealand	20 January 1986	Drawn	1–1	Hutt Recreation Ground, Lower Hutt	New Zealand won by 5 wickets	
2	1985–86	New Zealand	20 January 1986	Drawn	1–1	Lancaster Park, Christchurch	No result	
3	1986–87	Australia	18 January 1987	New Zealand	2–1	Willetton Sports Club No. 1, Perth	New Zealand won by 8 wickets	
3	1986–87	Australia	18 January 1987	New Zealand	2–1	Willetton Sports Club No. 1, Perth	New Zealand won by 4 wickets	
3	1986–87	Australia	18 January 1987	New Zealand	2–1	Rosalie Parks, Perth	Australia won by 8 wickets	
4	1987–88	New Zealand	20 January 1988	Australia	3–0	Eden Park, Auckland	Australia won by 8 runs	
4	1987–88	New Zealand	20 January 1988	Australia	3–0	Lancaster Park, Christchurch	Australia won by 28 runs	
4	1987–88	New Zealand	20 January 1988	Australia	3–0	Basin Reserve, Wellington	Australia won by 4 wickets	
5	1988–89	Australia	7 December 1988	Australia	2–0	Manuka Oval, Canberra	Australia won by 46 runs	^{[A]}
5	1988–89	Australia	7 December 1988	Australia	2–0	Albert Cricket Ground, Melbourne	Australia won by 75 runs	^{[A]}
6	1989–90	New Zealand	6 February 1990	Australia	2–1	Lancaster Park, Christchurch	Australia won by 3 wickets	
6	1989–90	New Zealand	6 February 1990	Australia	2–1	Hutt Recreation Ground, Lower Hutt	New Zealand won by 8 wickets	
6	1989–90	New Zealand	6 February 1990	Australia	2–1	Hutt Recreation Ground, Lower Hutt	Australia won by 57 runs	
7	1990–91	Australia	17 January 1991	Australia	2–1	Bellerive Oval, Hobart	Australia won by 8 wickets	
7	1990–91	Australia	17 January 1991	Australia	2–1	Melbourne Grammar School, Melbourne	Australia won by 86 runs	
7	1990–91	Australia	17 January 1991	Australia	2–1	Albert Cricket Ground, Melbourne	New Zealand won by 5 wickets	
8	1991–92	Australia	13 January 1993	Drawn	1–1	Basin Reserve, Wellington	Australia won by 7 wickets	^{[B]}
8	1991–92	Australia	13 January 1993	Drawn	1–1	Hagley Oval, Christchurch	New Zealand won by 3 wickets	^{[B]}
9	1992–93	Australia	13 January 1993	Australia	2–1	Oakes Oval, Lismore	Australia won by 86 runs	
9	1992–93	Australia	13 January 1993	Australia	2–1	The Gabba, Brisbane	Australia won by 9 wickets	
9	1992–93	Australia	13 January 1993	Australia	2–1	The Gabba, Brisbane	New Zealand won by 5 wickets	
10	1993–94	New Zealand	18 January 1994	New Zealand	2–1	Eden Park, Auckland	New Zealand won by 3 wickets	
10	1993–94	New Zealand	18 January 1994	New Zealand	2–1	Levin Domain, Levin	Australia won by 43 runs	
10	1993–94	New Zealand	18 January 1994	New Zealand	2–1	Basin Reserve, Wellington	New Zealand won by 2 runs	
11	1994–95	New Zealand	14 January 1995	Drawn	1–1	Victoria Park, Whanganui	New Zealand won by 1 run	^{[C]}
11	1994–95	New Zealand	14 January 1995	Drawn	1–1	Eden Park, Auckland	Australia won by 6 wickets	^{[C]}
12	1995–96	Australia	1 February 1996	Australia	2–1	St Peter's College, Adelaide	New Zealand won by 11 runs	
12	1995–96	Australia	1 February 1996	Australia	2–1	Adelaide Oval, Adelaide	Australia won by 4 runs	
12	1995–96	Australia	1 February 1996	Australia	2–1	Adelaide Oval, Adelaide	Australia won by 7 wickets	
13	1996–97	Australia	13 February 1997	Australia	4–1	McLean Park, Napier	New Zealand won by 22 runs	
13	1996–97	Australia	13 February 1997	Australia	4–1	Eden Park, Auckland	Australia won by 89 runs	
13	1996–97	Australia	13 February 1997	Australia	4–1	Lancaster Park, Christchurch	Australia won by 11 runs	
13	1996–97	Australia	13 February 1997	Australia	4–1	Basin Reserve, Wellington	Australia won by 6 wickets	
13	1996–97	Australia	13 February 1997	Australia	4–1	Basin Reserve, Wellington	Australia won by 3 wickets	
14	1997–98	Australia	5 November 1997	Australia	2–1	Bankstown Oval, Sydney	Australia won by 5 runs	
14	1997–98	Australia	5 November 1997	Australia	2–1	Bankstown Oval, Sydney	Australia won by 61 runs	
14	1997–98	Australia	5 November 1997	Australia	2–1	Bankstown Oval, Sydney	New Zealand won by 1 wicket	
15	1998–99	New Zealand	13 February 1999	New Zealand	2–1	Fitzherbert Park, Palmerston North	New Zealand won by 3 wickets	
15	1998–99	New Zealand	13 February 1999	New Zealand	2–1	Fitzherbert Park, Palmerston North	New Zealand won by 23 runs	
15	1998–99	New Zealand	13 February 1999	New Zealand	2–1	Basin Reserve, Wellington	Australia won by 131 runs	
16	1999–2000	Australia	6 February 2000	Australia	3–0	Albert Cricket Ground, Melbourne	Australia won by 13 runs	
16	1999–2000	Australia	6 February 2000	Australia	3–0	Albert Cricket Ground, Melbourne	Australia won by 6 wickets	
16	1999–2000	Australia	6 February 2000	Australia	3–0	Junction Oval, Melbourne	Australia won by 7 wickets	
17	2001–02	Australia and New Zealand	20 February 2002	Australia	5–1	Adelaide Oval, Adelaide	Australia won by 53 runs	^{[D]}
17	2001–02	Australia and New Zealand	20 February 2002	Australia	5–1	Adelaide Oval, Adelaide	Australia won by 3 wickets (D/N)	^{[D]}
17	2001–02	Australia and New Zealand	20 February 2002	Australia	5–1	Melbourne Cricket Ground, Melbourne	Australia won by 57 runs	^{[D]}
17	2001–02	Australia and New Zealand	20 February 2002	Australia	5–1	Bert Sutcliffe Oval, Lincoln	New Zealand won by 22 runs	^{[D]}
17	2001–02	Australia and New Zealand	20 February 2002	Australia	5–1	Bert Sutcliffe Oval, Lincoln	Australia won by 17 runs	^{[D]}
17	2001–02	Australia and New Zealand	20 February 2002	Australia	5–1	Bert Sutcliffe Oval, Lincoln	Australia won by 6 wickets	^{[D]}
18	2002–03	New Zealand	26 January 2003	Australia	3–0	Bert Sutcliffe Oval, Lincoln	Australia won by 63 runs	^{[E]}
18	2002–03	New Zealand	26 January 2003	Australia	3–0	Bert Sutcliffe Oval, Lincoln	Australia won by 6 wickets	^{[E]}
18	2002–03	New Zealand	26 January 2003	Australia	3–0	Bert Sutcliffe Oval, Lincoln	Australia won by 109 runs	^{[E]}
19	2003–04	Australia and New Zealand	11 February 2004	Australia	5–1	Eden Park Outer Oval, Auckland	Australia won by 78 runs	
19	2003–04	Australia and New Zealand	11 February 2004	Australia	5–1	Westpac Park, Hamilton	Australia won by 8 wickets	
19	2003–04	Australia and New Zealand	11 February 2004	Australia	5–1	Westpac Park, Hamilton	Australia won by 83 runs	
19	2003–04	Australia and New Zealand	11 February 2004	Australia	5–1	Bankstown Oval, Sydney	New Zealand won by 20 runs	
19	2003–04	Australia and New Zealand	11 February 2004	Australia	5–1	Albert Cricket Ground, Melbourne	Australia won by 40 runs	
19	2003–04	Australia and New Zealand	11 February 2004	Australia	5–1	Bellerive Oval, Hobart	Australia won by 4 wickets	
20	2004–05	Australia	10 March 2005	Australia	3–0	Lilac Hill Park, Perth	Australia won by 87 runs	
20	2004–05	Australia	10 March 2005	Australia	3–0	WACA Ground, Perth	Australia won by 7 runs	
20	2004–05	Australia	10 March 2005	Australia	3–0	Western Australia Cricket Association Ground, Perth	Australia won by 3 wickets	
21	2006–07	Australia	20 October 2006	Australia	5–0	Allan Border Field, Brisbane	Australia won by 1 run	
21	2006–07	Australia	20 October 2006	Australia	5–0	Allan Border Field, Brisbane	Australia won by 1 wicket	
21	2006–07	Australia	20 October 2006	Australia	5–0	Allan Border Field, Brisbane	Australia won by 5 runs	
21	2006–07	Australia	20 October 2006	Australia	5–0	Allan Border Field, Brisbane	Australia won by 85 runs	
21	2006–07	Australia	20 October 2006	Australia	5–0	Allan Border Field, Brisbane	Australia won by 4 wickets	
22	2007	Australia	21 July 2007	Australia	3–2	Gardens Oval, Darwin	Australia won by 7 wickets	
22	2007	Australia	21 July 2007	Australia	3–2	Gardens Oval, Darwin	New Zealand won by 35 runs	
22	2007	Australia	21 July 2007	Australia	3–2	Gardens Oval, Darwin	Australia won by 6 wickets	
22	2007	Australia	21 July 2007	Australia	3–2	Gardens Oval, Darwin	Australia won by 2 runs	
22	2007	Australia	21 July 2007	Australia	3–2	Gardens Oval, Darwin	New Zealand won by 4 wickets	
23	2007–08	New Zealand	8 March 2008	Australia	3–2	Bert Sutcliffe Oval, Lincoln	Australia won by 63 runs	
23	2007–08	New Zealand	8 March 2008	Australia	3–2	Bert Sutcliffe Oval, Lincoln	New Zealand won by 82 runs	
23	2007–08	New Zealand	8 March 2008	Australia	3–2	Bert Sutcliffe Oval, Lincoln	New Zealand won by 5 wickets	
23	2007–08	New Zealand	8 March 2008	Australia	3–2	Bert Sutcliffe Oval, Lincoln	Australia won by 6 runs	
23	2007–08	New Zealand	8 March 2008	Australia	3–2	Bert Sutcliffe Oval, Lincoln	Australia won by 8 wickets	
24	2008–09	New Zealand	1 February 2009	Drawn	2–2	Cobham Oval, Whangārei	New Zealand won by 2 wickets	
24	2008–09	New Zealand	1 February 2009	Drawn	2–2	Cobham Oval, Whangārei	New Zealand won by 4 runs	
24	2008–09	New Zealand	1 February 2009	Drawn	2–2	Seddon Park, Hamilton	Australia won by 104 runs (D/N)	
24	2008–09	New Zealand	1 February 2009	Drawn	2–2	Seddon Park, Hamilton	Australia won by 44 runs	
24	2008–09	New Zealand	1 February 2009	Drawn	2–2	Basin Reserve, Wellington	Match abandoned without a ball being bowled	
25	2009–10	Australia and New Zealand	10 February 2010	Australia	8–0	Adelaide Oval, Adelaide	Australia won by 115 runs	
25	2009–10	Australia and New Zealand	10 February 2010	Australia	8–0	Adelaide Oval, Adelaide	Australia won by 4 wickets (D/L method)	
25	2009–10	Australia and New Zealand	10 February 2010	Australia	8–0	Junction Oval, Melbourne	Australia won by 102 runs	
25	2009–10	Australia and New Zealand	10 February 2010	Australia	8–0	Junction Oval, Melbourne	Australia won by 10 wickets	
25	2009–10	Australia and New Zealand	10 February 2010	Australia	8–0	Junction Oval, Melbourne	Australia won by 103 runs	
25	2009–10	Australia and New Zealand	10 February 2010	Australia	8–0	Queenstown Events Centre, Queenstown	Australia won by 2 wickets	
25	2009–10	Australia and New Zealand	10 February 2010	Australia	8–0	Queen's Park, Invercargill	Australia won by 6 wickets	
25	2009–10	Australia and New Zealand	10 February 2010	Australia	8–0	Queen's Park, Invercargill	Australia won by 6 wickets	
26	2010–11	Australia and New Zealand	24 February 2011	Australia	2–0	Bert Sutcliffe Oval, Lincoln	Match cancelled	
26	2010–11	Australia and New Zealand	24 February 2011	Australia	2–0	Bert Sutcliffe Oval, Lincoln	Match cancelled	
26	2010–11	Australia and New Zealand	24 February 2011	Australia	2–0	Bert Sutcliffe Oval, Lincoln	Match cancelled	
26	2010–11	Australia and New Zealand	24 February 2011	Australia	2–0	Allan Border Field, Brisbane	Match abandoned without a ball bowled	
26	2010–11	Australia and New Zealand	24 February 2011	Australia	2–0	Allan Border Field, Brisbane	Australia won by 6 wickets	
26	2010–11	Australia and New Zealand	24 February 2011	Australia	2–0	Allan Border Field, Brisbane	Australia won by 19 runs	
27	2011–12	Australia	25 January 2012	Australia	1–0	Sydney Cricket Ground, Sydney	No result	
27	2011–12	Australia	25 January 2012	Australia	1–0	Blacktown Olympic Park Oval, Sydney	Match abandoned without a ball bowled	
27	2011–12	Australia	25 January 2012	Australia	1–0	Blacktown Olympic Park Oval, Sydney	Australia won by 9 wickets	
28	2012–13	Australia	12 December 2012	Australia	3–1	Sydney Cricket Ground, Sydney	New Zealand won by 8 wickets	
28	2012–13	Australia	12 December 2012	Australia	3–1	North Sydney Oval, Sydney	Australia won by 4 wickets	
28	2012–13	Australia	12 December 2012	Australia	3–1	North Sydney Oval, Sydney	Australia won by 9 wickets	
28	2012–13	Australia	12 December 2012	Australia	3–1	North Sydney Oval, Sydney	Australia won by 7 runs	
29	2015–16	New Zealand	20 February 2016	Australia	2–1	Bay Oval, Mount Maunganui	New Zealand won by 9 runs	
29	2015–16	New Zealand	20 February 2016	Australia	2–1	Bay Oval, Mount Maunganui	Australia won by 8 wickets	
29	2015–16	New Zealand	20 February 2016	Australia	2–1	Bay Oval, Mount Maunganui	Australia won by 6 wickets	
30	2016–17	New Zealand	26 February 2017	Australia	2–1	Eden Park No 2, Auckland	New Zealand won by 5 wickets	
30	2016–17	New Zealand	26 February 2017	Australia	2–1	Bay Oval, Mount Maunganui	Australia won by 4 wickets	
30	2016–17	New Zealand	26 February 2017	Australia	2–1	Bay Oval, Mount Maunganui	Australia won by 5 wickets	
31	2018–19	Australia	22 February 2019	Australia	3–0	WACA Ground, Perth	Australia won by 5 runs	
31	2018–19	Australia	22 February 2019	Australia	3–0	Karen Rolton Oval, Adelaide	Australia won by 95 runs	
31	2018–19	Australia	22 February 2019	Australia	3–0	Junction Oval, Melbourne	Australia won by 7 wickets	
32	2020–21	Australia	3 October 2020	Australia	3–0	Allan Border Field, Brisbane	Australia won by 7 wickets	
32	2020–21	Australia	3 October 2020	Australia	3–0	Allan Border Field, Brisbane	Australia won by 4 wickets	
32	2020–21	Australia	3 October 2020	Australia	3–0	Allan Border Field, Brisbane	Australia won by 232 runs	
33	2020–21	New Zealand	4 April 2021	Australia	3–0	Bay Oval, Mount Maunganui	Australia won by 6 wickets	
33	2020–21	New Zealand	4 April 2021	Australia	3–0	Bay Oval, Mount Maunganui	Australia won by 71 runs	
33	2020–21	New Zealand	4 April 2021	Australia	3–0	Bay Oval, Mount Maunganui	Australia won by 21 runs	
34	2024–25	New Zealand	19 December 2024	Australia	2–0	Basin Reserve, Wellington	Match abandoned	
34	2024–25	New Zealand	19 December 2024	Australia	2–0	Basin Reserve, Wellington	Australia won by 65 runs (DLS method)	
34	2024–25	New Zealand	19 December 2024	Australia	2–0	Basin Reserve, Wellington	Australia won by 75 runs	

== Notes ==
A. ^{a} The 1988–89 series was part of the 1988 World Cup.
B. ^{b} The 1991–92 series was part of a triangular series also including England, shared between England and Australia.
C. ^{c} The 1994–95 series was part of the New Zealand Women's Centenary Tournament, a triangular tournament won by India.
D. ^{d} The 2001–02 series was won by Australia on points, 14–2, where home wins were awarded two points and away wins three.
E. ^{e} The 2002–03 series was part of the World Series of Women's Cricket, a four-team tournament also involving England and India. The final match of the series was the final of the tournament.
