= New Zealand women's cricket team in Australia in 2011–12 =

	Australia	New Zealand
- Dates: 20 January – 3 February 2012
Captains	Jodie Fields	Suzie Bates

One Day International series
- Results: Australia won the 3-match series 1–0
Most runs	Leah Poulton (61)	Lucy Doolan (43)
Most wickets	Ellyse Perry (3); Julie Hunter (3)	Lea Tahuhu (1)
- Player of the series: Julie Hunter (Aus)

Twenty20 International series
- Results: Australia won the 5-match series 4–1
Most runs	Alex Blackwell (99)	Amy Satterthwaite (89)
Most wickets	Lisa Sthalekar (10)	Frances Mackay (7)
- Player of the series: Lisa Sthalekar (Aus)

The New Zealand women's national cricket team toured Australia in January and February 2012. They played against Australia in five Twenty20 Internationals and three One Day Internationals, as part of the Rose Bowl. Australia won both series: the T20Is 4–1 and the ODIs 1–0.

== Squads ==
Australia	New Zealand
Jodie Fields (c) (wk); Alex Blackwell; Sarah Coyte; Jess Duffin; Rachael Haynes; Alyssa Healy; Julie Hunter; Jess Jonassen; Meg Lanning; Sharon Millanta; Erin Osborne; Ellyse Perry; Leah Poulton; Clea Smith (withdrawn); Lisa Sthalekar	Aimee Watkins (c); Suzie Bates; Rachel Candy; Lucy Doolan; Kate Ebrahim; Maddy Green; Frances Mackay; Katey Martin (wk); Sara McGlashan; Morna Nielsen; Katie Perkins; Liz Perry; Amy Satterthwaite; Sian Ruck; Lea Tahuhu

== WT20I Series ==
=== 1st T20I ===
20 January 2012
Scorecard

New Zealand; 145/7 (20 overs)	v	Australia; 148/6 (19.5 overs)
Suzie Bates 33 (29); Ellyse Perry 2/27 (4 overs); Julie Hunter 2/27 (4 overs)		Jess Duffin 59 (41); Sian Ruck 2/19 (4 overs)

Australia Women won by 4 wickets
North Sydney Oval, Sydney
Umpires: Sam Nogajski (Aus) and Tony Ward (Aus)
Player of the match: Jess Duffin (Aus)

- Australia Women won the toss and elected to field.
- Jess Jonassen (Aus), Morna Nielsen and Katie Perkins (NZ) all made their WT20I debuts.

=== 2nd T20I ===
21 January 2012
Scorecard

Australia; 128/5 (20 overs)	v	New Zealand; 69 (17.1 overs)
Lisa Sthalekar 52 (32); Frances Mackay 2/15 (2 overs)		Katie Perkins 19 (16); Lisa Sthalekar 3/16 (3.1 overs)

Australia Women won by 59 runs
North Sydney Oval, Sydney
Umpires: Sam Nogajski (Aus) and Damien Mealey (Aus)
Player of the match: Lisa Sthalekar (Aus)

- New Zealand Women won the toss and elected to field.

=== 3rd T20I ===
22 January 2012
Scorecard

Australia; 134/8 (20 overs)	v	New Zealand; 127/8 (20 overs)
Alex Blackwell 41 (43); Frances Mackay 3/18 (3 overs)		Amy Satterthwaite 45 (40); Lisa Sthalekar 4/18 (4 overs)

Australia Women won by 7 runs
North Sydney Oval, Sydney
Umpires: Damien Mealey (Aus) and Tony Ward (Aus)
Player of the match: Lisa Sthalekar (Aus)

- Australia Women won the toss and elected to bat.

=== 4th T20I ===
1 February 2012
Scorecard

Australia; 92/7 (18 overs)	v	New Zealand; 95/4 (17.1 overs)
Jodie Fields 37* (40); Kate Ebrahim 3/9 (4 overs)		Suzie Bates 40* (42); Lisa Sthalekar 2/19 (4 overs)

New Zealand Women won by 6 wickets
Stadium Australia, Sydney
Umpires: Sam Nogajski (Aus) and Simon Fry (Aus)
Player of the match: Suzie Bates (NZ)

- Australia Women won the toss and elected to bat.
- Match reduced to 18 overs per side due to rain.
- Sharon Millanta (Aus) and Maddy Green (NZ) both made their WT20I debuts.

=== 5th T20I ===
3 February 2012
Scorecard

Australia; 129/7 (20 overs)	v	New Zealand; 109/7 (20 overs)
Alyssa Healy 30 (27); Lucy Doolan 3/21 (4 overs)		Frances Mackay 21* (19); Julie Hunter 2/15 (4 overs)

Australia Women won by 20 runs
Melbourne Cricket Ground, Melbourne
Umpires: Geoff Joshua (Aus) and Paul Reiffel (Aus)
Player of the match: Ellyse Perry (Aus)

- Australia Women won the toss and elected to bat.

== WODI Series ==
=== 1st ODI ===
25 January 2012
Scorecard

New Zealand; 100/2 (22.3 overs)	v	Australia
Lucy Doolan 43 (74); Erin Osborne 1/3 (1 over)

No Result
Sydney Cricket Ground, Sydney
Umpires: Gerard Abood (Aus) and Nathan Johnstone (Aus)

- Australia Women won the toss and elected to field.
- No further play possible due to rain.
- Jess Jonassen (Aus) and Katie Perkins (NZ) both made their WODI debuts.

=== 2nd ODI ===
27 January 2012
Scorecard

Australia	v	New Zealand

Match Abandoned
Blacktown Olympic Park Oval, Sydney
Umpires: Michael Kumutat (Aus) and Nathan Johnstone (Aus)

- No toss.
- No play possible due to rain.

=== 3rd ODI ===
29 January 2012
Scorecard

New Zealand; 125 (39.1 overs)	v	Australia; 126/1 (16.4 overs)
Katie Perkins 33 (71); Ellyse Perry 3/16 (8.1 overs)		Leah Poulton 61* (53); Lea Tahuhu 1/30 (5 overs)

Australia Women won by 9 wickets
Blacktown Olympic Park Oval, Sydney
Umpires: Michael Kumutat (Aus) and Nathan Johnstone (Aus)
Player of the match: Julie Hunter (Aus)

- New Zealand Women won the toss and elected to bat.
