= Barbara Bevege =

New Zealand cricketer

Personal information
- Full name: Barbara Lynette Bevege
- Born: 25 November 1942; Wellington, New Zealand
- Died: 29 April 1999 (aged 56); Wellington, New Zealand
- Batting: Right-handed
- Bowling: Right-arm medium
- Role: All-rounder

International information
- National side: New Zealand (1973–1982)
- Test debut (cap 64): 21 March 1975 v Australia
- Last Test: 26 January 1979 v Australia
- ODI debut (cap 1): 23 June 1973 v Trinidad and Tobago
- Last ODI: 6 February 1982 v Australia

Domestic team information
- Years: Team
- 1962/63: Auckland
- 1967/68–1981/82: Wellington

Career statistics
Competition	WTest	WODI	WFC	WLA
Matches	5	16	67	33
Runs scored	400	488	2,803	1,215
Batting average	44.44	32.53	31.49	43.39
100s/50s	1/2	1/3	2/14	1/9
Top score	100*	101	123	101
Balls bowled	202	134	1,018	209
Wickets	0	3	25	4
Bowling average	–	16.00	17.52	17.75
5 wickets in innings	0	0	1	0
10 wickets in match	0	0	0	0
Best bowling	–	3/17	5/44	3/17
Catches/stumpings	3/–	3/–	48/–	12/–
- Source: CricketArchive, 16 November 2021

Barbara Lynette Bevege (25 November 1942 – 29 April 1999) was a New Zealand cricketer who played as a right-handed batter and right-arm medium bowler. She appeared in five Test matches and 16 One Day Internationals for New Zealand between 1973 and 1982. She mainly played domestic cricket for Wellington, as well as appearing once for Auckland.

She was the first woman to score both a Test century and a One Day International century for New Zealand. Her Test hundred came against India in Dunedin in 1976–77 while her One Day International (ODI) century came against International XI at the 1982 World Cup, when she put on 180 with Lesley Murdoch. She also set the record for the oldest woman to score her maiden ODI hundred, at the age of 39 years and 48 days. She scored 400 runs in Test match cricket at an average of 44.44. In One Day Internationals, she scored 488 runs at 32.53. She also took 3 for 17 against Australia, her only ODI wickets.

She died in 1999 after a long illness.
