= Debbie Martin (cricketer) =

Australian cricketer

Personal information
- Full name: Deborah Leila Martin
- Born: 23 February 1955 (age 71); Sydney, Australia
- Batting: Right-handed
- Bowling: Right-arm medium
- Role: All-rounder

International information
- National side: Australia (1979)
- Test debut (cap 89): 12 January 1979 v New Zealand
- Last Test: 26 January 1979 v New Zealand

Domestic team information
- Years: Team
- 1976/77–1980/81: New South Wales

Career statistics
Competition	WTest	WFC	WLA
Matches	3	22	10
Runs scored	73	567	154
Batting average	18.25	21.80	19.25
100s/50s	0/0	0/1	1/0
Top score	36	78	100
Balls bowled	16	852	258
Wickets	0	17	10
Bowling average	–	13.17	7.80
5 wickets in innings	0	0	0
10 wickets in match	0	0	0
Best bowling	–	4/26	3/21
Catches/stumpings	0/–	2/–	1/–
- Source: CricketArchive, 10 November 2023

Deborah Leila Martin (born 23 February 1955) is an Australian former cricketer who played as a right-handed batter and right-arm medium bowler. She appeared in three Test matches for Australia, all during their series against New Zealand in 1979, scoring 73 runs at an average of 18.25. She played domestic cricket for New South Wales.
