= Kim Bradley (cricketer) =

Australian former cricket player

Personal information
- Born: 7 September 1967 (age 59)
- Batting: Right-handed
- Bowling: Right-arm medium

International information
- National side: Australia
- ODI debut (cap 72): 20 January 1994 v New Zealand
- Last ODI: 22 January 1994 v New Zealand

Career statistics
Competition	ODI	FC	LA
Matches	2	6	17
Runs scored	0	86	70
Batting average	–	43.00	11.66
100s/50s	0/0	0/0	0/0
Top score	0*	39	23
Balls bowled	120	573	756
Wickets	1	11	12
Bowling average	38.00	14.45	23.58
5 wickets in innings	0	0	0
10 wickets in match	0	0	0
Best bowling	1/24	4/22	3/17
Catches/stumpings	0/–	1/–	5/–
- Source: Cricinfo, 4 May 2025

Kim Bradley (born 7 September 1967 in Melbourne, Victoria) is an Australian former cricket player. She played for the Victorian state women's cricket team between 1992 and 1998. Bradley played two One Day Internationals for the Australia national women's cricket team.
