= Cor van der Flier =

Dutch cricketer (born 1947)

Personal information
- Full name: Cor Z van der Flier
- Born: 1947 (age 78–79); Netherlands
- Bowling: Right-arm off break
- Role: Bowler

International information
- National side: Netherlands (1984)
- Only ODI (cap 8): 8 August 1984 v New Zealand

Career statistics
Competition	WODI
Matches	1
Runs scored	4
Batting average	4.00
100s/50s	0/0
Top score	4
Balls bowled	66
Wickets	4
Bowling average	6.00
5 wickets in innings	0
10 wickets in match	0
Best bowling	4/24
Catches/stumpings	0/–
- Source: CricketArchive, 12 June 2021

Cor Z van der Flier (born 1947) is a Dutch former cricketer who played as a right-arm off break bowler. She appeared in one One Day International for the Netherlands in 1984, the team's first. Against New Zealand, van der Flier took 4/24 from her 11 overs, which at the time was the 6th best bowling figures taken on WODI debut.

van der Flier also played for the Netherlands on various tours, such as of South Africa in 1969 and England between 1977 and 1981, where they played against various club and county sides. In a match against Bedale Women in 1977, van der Flier took 5/36 and scored 67* in a 4 wicket victory.
