= Carol Marett =

New Zealand cricketer (born 1944)

Personal information
- Full name: Carol Elizabeth Marett
- Born: 11 May 1944 (age 82); Auckland, New Zealand
- Batting: Right-handed
- Bowling: Right-arm medium
- Role: All-rounder

International information
- National side: New Zealand (1972–1982)
- Test debut (cap 63): 10 March 1972 v South Africa
- Last Test: 26 January 1979 v Australia
- ODI debut (cap 6): 23 June 1973 v Trinidad and Tobago
- Last ODI: 6 February 1982 v Australia

Domestic team information
- Years: Team
- 1962/63–1966/67: Auckland
- 1967/68–1976/77: Otago
- 1977/78–1979/80: Auckland
- 1980/81–1983/84: North Shore

Career statistics
Competition	WTest	WODI	WFC	WLA
Matches	7	14	81	26
Runs scored	304	148	2,506	324
Batting average	33.77	14.80	23.42	20.25
100s/50s	0/0	0/0	2/9	0/1
Top score	49	24	125*	59
Balls bowled	922	761	10,187	1,553
Wickets	9	16	186	27
Bowling average	29.77	19.37	20.72	25.37
5 wickets in innings	0	0	3	0
10 wickets in match	0	0	0	0
Best bowling	2/16	3/14	6/42	3/13
Catches/stumpings	3/–	0/–	32/–	2/–
- Source: CricketArchive, 15 November 2021

Carol Elizabeth Marett (née Early; born 11 May 1944) is a New Zealand former cricketer who played as an all-rounder, batting right-handed and bowling right-arm medium. She appeared in 7 Test matches and 14 One Day Internationals for New Zealand between 1972 and 1982. She played domestic cricket for Auckland, Otago and North Shore.
