= Sharyn Bow =

Australian former cricket player

Personal information
- Full name: Sharyn Lena Bow
- Born: 16 October 1971 (age 55); Australia
- Batting: Right-handed
- Bowling: Right-arm Leg-break

International information
- National side: Australia
- ODI debut (cap 69): 16 January 1993 v New Zealand
- Last ODI: 22 January 1994 v New Zealand

Domestic team information
- Years: Team
- 1991/92–1995/96: Queensland

Career statistics
Competition	ODI
Matches	11
Runs scored	14
Batting average	4.66
100s/50s	0/0
Top score	5
Balls bowled	561
Wickets	19
Bowling average	13.94
5 wickets in innings	0
10 wickets in match	0
Best bowling	4/21
Catches/stumpings	4/–
- Source: CricInfo, 24 May 2014

Sharyn Lena Bow (born 16 October 1971) is an Australian former cricket player. Bow played eleven One Day Internationals for the Australia national women's cricket team. Bow was a member of the Australian cricket team at the 1993 Women's Cricket World Cup.
