= Lynette Cook =

Australian former cricket player

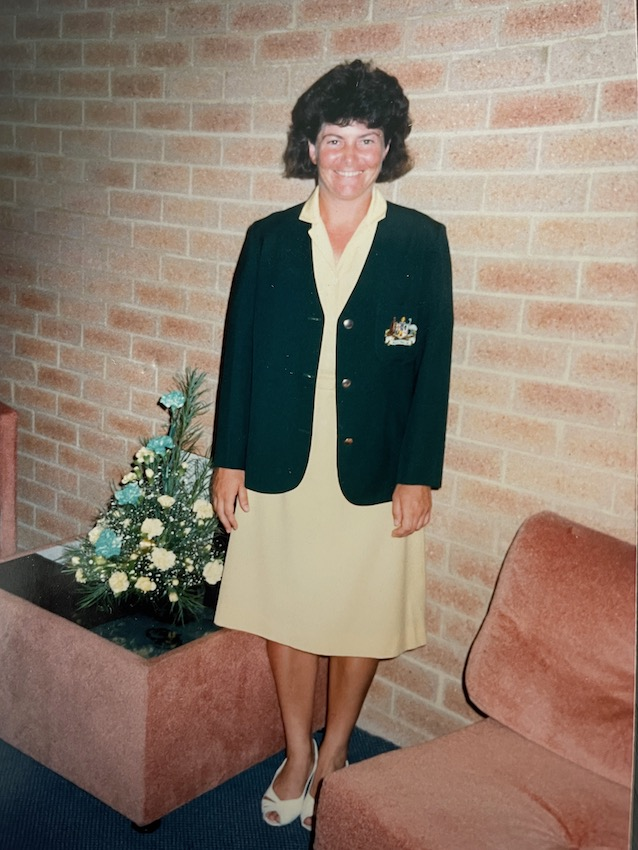

Personal information
- Full name: Lynette Gai Cook
- Batting: Right-handed
- Bowling: Right-arm Medium pace

International information
- National side: Australia
- ODI debut (cap 57): 19 January 1987 v New Zealand
- Last ODI: 21 January 1987 v New Zealand

Domestic team information
- Years: Team
- 1982/83–1989/90: ACT women's cricket team

Career statistics
Competition	ODI
Matches	2
Runs scored	0
Batting average	0
100s/50s	0/0
Top score	0
Balls bowled	60
Wickets	0
Bowling average	–
5 wickets in innings	–
10 wickets in match	–
Best bowling	–
Catches/stumpings	0/–
- Source: Cricinfo, 19 May 2014

Lynette Gai Cook (born 4 May 1959) is an Australian former cricketer. She played for the ACT women's cricket team between 1982 and 1990. Cook played two One Day Internationals for the Australia national women's cricket team.
