= Rose Signal =

New Zealand cricketer (born 1962)

Personal information
- Full name: Rosemary Jill Signal
- Born: 4 May 1962 (age 64); Feilding, New Zealand
- Batting: Right-handed
- Bowling: Right-arm medium
- Role: All-rounder
- Relatives: Liz Signal (twin sister)

International information
- National side: New Zealand (1984–1985)
- Only Test (cap 80): 6 July 1984 v England
- ODI debut (cap 36): 24 June 1984 v England
- Last ODI: 15 March 1985 v India

Domestic team information
- Years: Team
- 1979/80–1984/85: Central Districts

Career statistics
Competition	WTest	WODI	WFC	WLA
Matches	1	6	27	9
Runs scored	8	12	889	46
Batting average	8.00	6.00	23.39	11.50
100s/50s	0/0	0/0	0/6	0/0
Top score	8*	8	94*	31
Balls bowled	54	162	1,964	210
Wickets	0	2	34	2
Bowling average	–	44.50	17.97	53.50
5 wickets in innings	0	0	0	0
10 wickets in match	0	0	0	0
Best bowling	–	1/10	3/25	1/10
Catches/stumpings	0/–	2/–	10/–	2/–
- Source: CricketArchive, 6 May 2021

Rosemary Jill Signal (born 4 May 1962) is a New Zealand former cricketer who played as an all-rounder, batting right-handed and bowling right-arm medium. She appeared in 1 Test match and 6 One Day Internationals for New Zealand in 1984 and 1985. She played domestic cricket for Central Districts.

Her twin sister Liz also played cricket for New Zealand. They were the first twins to play test cricket together.
