= Frances Leonard =

Australian cricketer (born 1964)

Personal information
- Full name: Frances Jane Leonard
- Batting: Right-handed
- Bowling: Right arm medium

International information
- National side: Australia
- Only ODI (cap 52): 23 January 1986 v New Zealand

Career statistics
Competition	ODI	FC	LA
Matches	1	17	11
Runs scored	2	248	80
Batting average	2	24.80	8.88
100s/50s	0/0	0/0	0/0
Top score	2	49	27
Balls bowled	48	1,673	762
Wickets	0	30	7
Bowling average	–	16.03	45.57
5 wickets in innings	–	1	0
10 wickets in match	–	0	0
Best bowling	–	5/22	3/45
Catches/stumpings	0/–	9/–	0/–
- Source: Cricinfo, 4 May 2025

Frances Leonard (born 23 August 1964) is an Australian former cricket player. She was born at Mildura in Victoria.

Leonard played domestic cricket for the Australian Capital Territory women's cricket team between 1978 and 1982 and the Western Australian women's cricket team between 1985 and 1990. She played eleven "List A cricket" limited overs matches.

Leonard played one One Day International for the Australia national women's cricket team.
