= Cathy Smith (cricketer) =

Australian cricketer (born 1961)

Personal information
- Full name: Catherine Margaret Smith
- Batting: Right-handed
- Role: Wicket-keeper

International information
- National side: Australia
- ODI debut (cap 56): 18 January 1987 v New Zealand
- Last ODI: 2 July 1987 v Ireland

Domestic team information
- Years: Team
- 1985/86–1989/90: New South Wales women's cricket team

Career statistics
Competition	WODI
Matches	5
Runs scored	9
Batting average	9
100s/50s	0/0
Top score	9
Catches/stumpings	2/4
- Source: Cricinfo, 14 May 2014

Cathy Smith (born 12 January 1961) is an Australian former cricketer. Smith played domestic cricket New South Wales women's cricket team between 1985 and 1990. Smith played five One Day International matches for the Australia national women's cricket team.
