= Ev Miller =

New Zealand cricketer (born 1952)

Personal information
- Full name: Evelyn Luella Miller
- Born: 3 January 1952 (age 74); Auckland, New Zealand
- Batting: Right-handed
- Bowling: Right-arm medium
- Role: Batter

International information
- National side: New Zealand (1979)
- Test debut (cap 72): 12 January 1979 v Australia
- Last Test: 26 January 1979 v Australia

Domestic team information
- Years: Team
- 1972/73–1981/82: North Shore

Career statistics
Competition	WTest	WFC	WLA
Matches	3	36	12
Runs scored	92	1,207	215
Batting average	15.33	22.35	17.91
100s/50s	0/0	0/6	0/0
Top score	32	84*	39
Balls bowled	–	18	–
Wickets	–	0	–
Bowling average	–	–	–
5 wickets in innings	–	0	–
10 wickets in match	–	0	–
Best bowling	–	–	–
Catches/stumpings	1/–	20/–	2/–
- Source: Cricinfo, 13 October 2021

Evelyn Luella Miller (née Cooper; born 3 January 1952) is a New Zealand former cricketer who played as a right-handed batter. She appeared in three Test matches for New Zealand in 1979. She played domestic cricket for North Shore.
