= Delwyn Costello =

New Zealand cricketer (1960–2018)

Personal information
- Full name: Delwyn Anne Costello
- Born: 14 January 1960; Wellington, New Zealand
- Died: 4 August 2018 (aged 58); Christchurch, New Zealand
- Batting: Right-handed
- Bowling: Right-arm medium
- Role: Bowler

International information
- National side: New Zealand (1985)
- Only Test (cap 84): 23 February 1985 v India
- ODI debut (cap 40): 7 February 1985 v Australia
- Last ODI: 24 March 1985 v India

Domestic team information
- Years: Team
- 1980/81–1986/87: Canterbury

Career statistics
Competition	WTest	WODI	WFC	WLA
Matches	1	7	24	14
Runs scored	0	1	12	17
Batting average	0.00	1.00	6.00	17.00
100s/50s	0/0	0/0	0/0	0/0
Top score	0	1	10*	9*
Balls bowled	240	340	1,993	722
Wickets	2	2	50	11
Bowling average	52.00	69.50	16.56	27.45
5 wickets in innings	0	0	2	0
10 wickets in match	0	0	0	0
Best bowling	2/77	2/37	5/33	4/4
Catches/stumpings	0/–	1/–	3/–	3/–
- Source: CricketArchive, 30 April 2021

Delwyn Anne Costello (14 January 1960 – 4 August 2018) was a New Zealand cricketer who played as a right-arm medium bowler. She appeared in 1 Test match and 7 One Day Internationals for New Zealand in 1985. She played domestic cricket for Canterbury.
