= June Edney =

English cricketer (born 1956)

Personal information
- Full name: June Elizabeth Edney
- Born: 27 April 1956 (age 70); Folkestone, Kent, England
- Batting: Right-handed
- Role: Wicket-keeper

International information
- National side: England (1984–1985)
- Test debut (cap 89): 6 July 1984 v New Zealand
- Last Test: 25 January 1985 v Australia
- ODI debut (cap 34): 24 June 1984 v New Zealand
- Last ODI: 3 February 1985 v Australia

Domestic team information
- Years: Team
- 1976–1987: Kent

Career statistics
Competition	WTest	WODI	WFC	WLA
Matches	8	6	17	27
Runs scored	284	65	801	497
Batting average	28.40	13.00	36.40	21.60
100s/50s	0/2	0/0	0/6	1/1
Top score	51*	35	95*	106
Catches/stumpings	11/2	4/1	18/6	20/6
- Source: CricketArchive, 27 February 2021

June Elizabeth Edney (née Law; born 27 April 1956) is an English former cricketer who played as a right-handed batter and wicket-keeper. She appeared in 8 Test matches and 6 One Day Internationals for England between 1984 and 1985. She played domestic cricket for Kent.
