= Jill Stockdale =

English cricketer (born 1963)

Personal information
- Full name: Jill Stockdale
- Born: October 1963 (age 63); Wharfedale, Yorkshire, England
- Role: Bowler

International information
- National side: England (1984–1985)
- Only Test (cap 96): 27 July 1984 v New Zealand
- ODI debut (cap 38): 31 January 1985 v Australia
- Last ODI: 2 February 1985 v Australia

Domestic team information
- Years: Team
- 1981–1984: Yorkshire

Career statistics
Competition	WTest	WODI	WFC	WLA
Matches	1	2	5	13
Runs scored	0	15	80	85
Batting average	–	7.50	20.00	12.14
100s/50s	–	0/0	0/0	0/0
Top score	–	13	42*	30
Balls bowled	72	54	378	578
Wickets	0	0	3	7
Bowling average	–	–	63.33	37.57
5 wickets in innings	–	–	0	0
10 wickets in match	–	–	0	0
Best bowling	–	–	2/19	2/14
Catches/stumpings	1/–	0/–	5/–	3/–
- Source: CricketArchive, 24 February 2021

Jill Stockdale (born October 1963) is an English cricketer and former member of the England women's cricket team. She played one Test match, against New Zealand, and two One Day Internationals, against Australia. She played domestic cricket for Yorkshire.
