= Leonie Callaghan =

Australian former cricket player

Cricket information
- Batting: Right-handed
- Bowling: Right-arm fast-medium

International information
- National side: Australia
- Only ODI (cap 44): 7 February 1985 v New Zealand

Career statistics
Competition	ODI
Matches	1
Runs scored	–
Batting average	–
100s/50s	–
Top score	–
Balls bowled	60
Wickets	1
Bowling average	13.00
5 wickets in innings	0
10 wickets in match	0
Best bowling	1/13
Catches/stumpings	0/–
- Source: CricInfo, 5 May 2014

Leonie Callaghan (born 1959) is an Australian former cricket player. Callaghan played for New South Wales women's cricket team between 1980 and 1985, and played one One Day International for the Australia national women's cricket team.
