= Danescourt, Wolverhampton =

Cricket ground in Wolverhampton, England

Danescourt
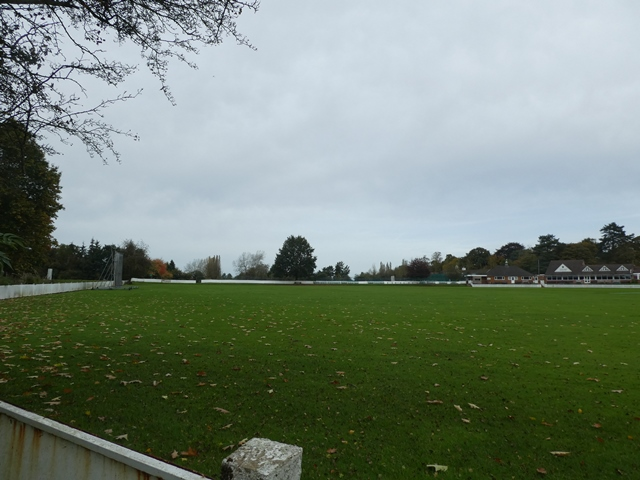
- Interactive map of Danescourt

Ground information
- Location: Wolverhampton, Staffordshire
- Country: England
- Coordinates: 52.6025°N 2.1711°W
- Establishment: 1890

International information
- Only women's ODI: 20 July 1973: England v Trinidad and Tobago

Team information
Staffordshire	(1900-1995)
- As of 6 September 2020; Source: Ground profile

Danescourt is a cricket ground in Wolverhampton, Staffordshire. The ground is located along the Danescourt Road, off of the A41 Road. It has played host to a Women's One Day International, in addition to playing host to Staffordshire County Cricket Club in minor counties cricket.

== History ==
Danescourt was established in 1890 as the homeground of Wolverhampton Cricket Club, which was founded in 1835. Staffordshire first played minor counties cricket there in 1900, hosting Northumberland in the Minor Counties Championship. Staffordshire used Danecourt intermittently throughout the 20th-century, with the ground hosting 35 Minor Counties Championship matches up to 1995. Danescourt was selected as one of the venues of the 1973 Women's World Cup, hosting a single Women's One Day International match between England Women and Trinidad and Tobago Women, which England, captained by Rachael Heyhoe Flint, won by 8 wickets.
