= Judy Esmond =

Australian cricketer (born 1960)

Cricket information
- Batting: Right-handed
- Role: Wicket-keeper

International information
- National side: Australia
- ODI debut (cap 46): 7 February 1985 v New Zealand
- Last ODI: 10 February 1985 v New Zealand

Career statistics
Competition	ODI
Matches	3
Runs scored	2
Batting average	–
100s/50s	0/0
Top score	2*
Catches/stumpings	4/1
- Source: CricInfo, 6 May 2014

Judy Esmond (born 27 January 1960) is a former Australian cricket player. Born at Perth, Esmond played for the Western Australian women's cricket team between 1982 and 1987, and played three One Day Internationals for the Australia national women's cricket team.
