= Kerry Saunders =

Australian cricketer (born 1960)

Cricket information
- Batting: Right-handed
- Bowling: Right-arm medium

International information
- National side: Australia
- ODI debut (cap 59): 20 January 1988 v New Zealand
- Last ODI: 20 January 1991 v New Zealand

Domestic team information
- Years: Team
- 1983/84–1993/94: Victorian state women's cricket team

Career statistics
Competition	WODI
Matches	13
Runs scored	31
Batting average	7.75
100s/50s	0/0
Top score	15 *
Balls bowled	516
Wickets	9
Bowling average	21.77
5 wickets in innings	0
10 wickets in match	0
Best bowling	2/17
Catches/stumpings	2/–
- Source: Cricinfo, 11 May 2014

Kerry Saunders (born 6 December 1960) is an Australian former cricketer. She played for the Victorian state women's cricket team between 1983 and 1994. Saunders played thirteen One Day Internationals for the Australia national women's cricket team.
