= Di Caird =

New Zealand cricketer (born 1958)

Personal information
- Full name: Susan Diana Caird
- Born: 24 November 1958 (age 67); Christchurch, New Zealand
- Batting: Right-handed
- Bowling: Right-arm off break
- Role: Batter

International information
- National side: New Zealand (1984)
- ODI debut (cap 32): 24 June 1984 v England
- Last ODI: 8 August 1984 v Netherlands

Domestic team information
- Years: Team
- 1979/80–1980/81: Central Districts
- 1981/82: Wellington
- 1982/83–1987/88: North Shore

Career statistics
Competition	WODI	WFC	WLA
Matches	4	27	26
Runs scored	72	959	451
Batting average	24.00	23.97	20.50
100s/50s	0/0	0/4	0/0
Top score	45	88	45
Balls bowled	–	771	–
Wickets	–	18	–
Bowling average	–	21.50	–
5 wickets in innings	–	0	–
10 wickets in match	–	0	–
Best bowling	–	3/60	–
Catches/stumpings	0/–	12/–	7/–
- Source: CricketArchive, 17 June 2021

Susan Diana Caird (born 24 November 1958) is a New Zealand former cricketer who played as a right-handed batter. She appeared in four One Day Internationals for New Zealand in 1984. She played domestic cricket for Central Districts, Wellington and North Shore.
