= Sally Moffat =

Australian cricketer (born 1964)

Personal information
- Full name: Sally-Ann Moffat
- Born: 29 December 1964 (age 61); Sydney, New South Wales, Australia
- Batting: Right-handed
- Bowling: Right-arm medium
- Role: Bowler

International information
- National side: Australia (1987–1992)
- Test debut (cap 118): 26 January 1990 v New Zealand
- Last Test: 9 February 1991 v India
- ODI debut (cap 55): 18 January 1987 v New Zealand
- Last ODI: 23 January 1992 v New Zealand

Domestic team information
- Years: Team
- 1980/81–1993/94: New South Wales

Career statistics
Competition	WTest	WODI	WFC	WLA
Matches	5	15	27	49
Runs scored	13	13	119	71
Batting average	–	4.33	11.90	10.14
100s/50s	0/0	0/0	0/0	0/0
Top score	10*	7*	119	19*
Balls bowled	1,025	888	3,814	2,831
Wickets	15	10	65	54
Bowling average	12.73	38.50	13.35	17.27
5 wickets in innings	0	0	0	1
10 wickets in match	0	0	0	0
Best bowling	4/33	3/19	4/15	5/22
Catches/stumpings	1/–	5/–	8/–	10/–
- Source: CricketArchive, 31 December 2022

Sally-Ann Moffat (born 29 December 1964) is an Australian former cricketer who played as a right-arm medium bowler. She appeared in five Test matches and 15 One Day Internationals for Australia between 1987 and 1992. She played domestic cricket for New South Wales.
