= Sharlene Heywood =

Australian cricketer (born 1963)

Personal information
- Full name: Sharlene Inez Heywood
- Batting: Right-handed
- Bowling: Right arm off spin

International information
- National side: Australia
- ODI debut (cap 50): 20 January 1986 v New Zealand
- Last ODI: 20 January 1991 v New Zealand

Career statistics
| Competition | ODI |
|---|---|
| Matches | 14 |
| Runs scored | 243 |
| Batting average | 24.30 |
| 100s/50s | 0/3 |
| Top score | 76 |
| Catches/stumpings | 2/– |
- Source: Cricinfo, 8 May 2014

Sharlene Heywood (born 22 February 1963) is an Australian former cricket player. Heywood played for the Victorian state women's cricket team between 1985 and 1991, and played fourteen One Day Internationals for the Australia national women's cricket team. She was born at Carlton, Victoria.
