= Shona Gilchrist =

New Zealand cricketer (born 1958)

Personal information
- Full name: Shona Mary Gilchrist
- Born: 8 October 1958 (age 68); Dunedin, New Zealand
- Batting: Right-handed
- Bowling: Right-arm medium
- Role: Bowler

International information
- National side: New Zealand (1984–1985)
- Test debut (cap 83): 14 July 1984 v England
- Last Test: 17 March 1985 v India
- ODI debut (cap 38): 21 July 1984 v England
- Last ODI: 13 March 1985 v India

Domestic team information
- Years: Team
- 1976/77–1978/79: Otago
- 1979/80–1985/86: Auckland

Career statistics
Competition	WTest	WODI	WFC	WLA
Matches	5	8	50	20
Runs scored	12	19	767	133
Batting average	12.00	4.75	16.67	10.23
100s/50s	0/0	0/0	0/3	0/0
Top score	7*	12	86	38
Balls bowled	1,033	462	7,140	1,043
Wickets	14	7	194	19
Bowling average	27.42	28.85	15.13	23.89
5 wickets in innings	0	0	11	0
10 wickets in match	0	0	3	0
Best bowling	3/42	3/20	8/26	3/20
Catches/stumpings	5/–	4/–	21/–	6/–
- Source: CricketArchive, 30 April 2021

Shona Mary Gilchrist (born 8 October 1958) is a New Zealand former cricketer who played as a right-arm medium bowler. She appeared in 5 Test matches and 8 One Day Internationals for New Zealand in 1984 and 1985. She played domestic cricket for Otago and Auckland.
