= Jodie Davis =

Australian cricketer and coach

Personal information
- Full name: Jodie Elizabeth Davis
- Born: 25 December 1966 (age 59)
- Batting: Right-handed
- Bowling: Right arm medium

International information
- National side: Australia
- Only ODI (cap 60): 25 January 1988 v New Zealand

Career statistics
| Competition | ODI |
|---|---|
| Matches | 1 |
| Runs scored | 10 |
| Batting average | 10 |
| 100s/50s | 0/0 |
| Top score | 10 |
| Catches/stumpings | 0/– |
- Source: Cricinfo, 10 May 2014

Jodie Davis (born 25 December 1966) is an Australian cricket coach and former cricketer. She coached the Pakistan women's team at the 1997 Women's Cricket World Cup in India. She was born at Canberra.

== Playing career ==
Davis initially played netball at school but played backyard cricket with her friends and joined a club in 1984. In only her second full season in club competition, she was selected in the senior ACT Team for the 1985/86 National Championships in Adelaide. Davis was selected in the Australian B squad in 1987. She was selected in the 1988 Australian team for the Shell Cup tour to New Zealand and played in one One Day International. She was a member of the Australian World Cup Squad in 1988 and narrowly missed out on playing in a home World Cup eventually won by Australia. She was in Australian squads in 89/90 and in 1992, she broke her leg playing soccer, disrupting her cricket career. She continued to play for ACT at Nationals until 1995 when ACT last attended a National Championships.

From 1992, she travelled from Canberra to Sydney with Australian player Bronwyn Calver to play for Gordon Cricket Club in the Sydney women's competition. She played for Gordon Cricket Club for 14 years with players such as Lisa Sthalekar and Alex and Kate Blackwell including a period as club captain and was awarded life membership of the club.

Davis' state representative cricket career included: member and captain of the ACT Women's Cricket Team (1985–1995, 2000) and member and captain of the ACT Women's Indoor Cricket Team (1987–1989, 1992, 1999). She played in the Inaugural Women's over 40s Cricket Championships held in Bowral in Nov 2019.

In 1989, Davis won her third consecutive Margaret Reid Perpetual Trophy for batting in the ACT Women's Cricket Association awards. In the ACT women's competition, Davis has played for Forsevin XI, Canberra North and Weston Creek. In 2019, she returned to play several games in the ACT Premier League, scoring 120* in one match.

She also represented ACT in baseball in 2010-11 and broomball in 2013-15

In 2023, Davis was named in Cricket ACT Women's Team of the Century.

== Coaching career ==
In 1988, Davis took up a Research Scholarship position in Biomechanics at the Australian Institute of Sport (AIS) working on a Swimming Telemetry initiative with Bruce Mason. She continued at the AIS (and then the Australian Sports Commission) in a range of positions until 2004.

Davis was sponsored by the Australian Sports Commission to coach the Pakistan women's team at the 1997 Women's Cricket World Cup in India. It was Pakistan's first entry into the Women's World Cricket Cup. In 2000, Davis completed the Cricket Australia Level 3 Elite Coaching Course.

She was ACT State Assistant Coach U16/U17 Boys (1993–1999, 2001–2000), ACT Senior and U19 State Women's Coach (1997, 2000, 2006, 2007), Australian Satellite Coach 1997-2000 and has been an individual coach to Bronwyn Calver and Kris Britt.

Davis has a sports science degree and a graduate diploma in information management from the University of Canberra.
