= Lois Simpson =

New Zealand cricketer and field hockey player

Personal information
- Full name: Lois Jane Simpson
- Born: 11 June 1961 (age 65); Feilding, New Zealand
- Batting: Right-handed
- Role: Batter

International information
- National side: New Zealand (1985–1988)
- Only Test (cap 86): 23 February 1985 v India
- ODI debut (cap 42): 7 February 1985 v Australia
- Last ODI: 25 January 1988 v Australia

Domestic team information
- Years: Team
- 1980/81–1982/83: Auckland
- 1983/84–1987/88: North Shore

Career statistics
Competition	WTest	WODI	WFC	WLA
Matches	1	12	30	28
Runs scored	6	95	1,179	386
Batting average	3.00	9.50	28.07	16.08
100s/50s	0/0	0/0	1/7	0/1
Top score	4	23*	103	75
Balls bowled	–	–	54	108
Wickets	–	–	2	2
Bowling average	–	–	5.00	37.00
5 wickets in innings	–	–	0	0
10 wickets in match	–	–	0	0
Best bowling	–	–	2/2	2/10
Catches/stumpings	0/–	1/–	4/–	3/–
- Source: Cricket Archive, 27 April 2021

Lois Jane Simpson (born 11 June 1961) is a New Zealand former cricketer and field hockey player. In cricket, she played as a right-handed batter and appeared in 1 Test match and 12 One Day Internationals for New Zealand between 1985 and 1988. She played domestic cricket for Auckland and North Shore. In hockey, she appeared six times for New Zealand.
