= Linda Fraser =

New Zealand cricketer (born 1953)

Personal information
- Full name: Linda Mary Fraser
- Born: 30 October 1953 (age 73); Napier, New Zealand
- Batting: Right-handed
- Bowling: Left-arm medium
- Role: Bowler

International information
- National side: New Zealand (1982–1987)
- Test debut (cap 76): 6 July 1984 v England
- Last Test: 27 July 1984 v England
- ODI debut (cap 31): 12 January 1982 v International XI
- Last ODI: 19 January 1987 v Australia

Domestic team information
- Years: Team
- 1978/79: Auckland
- 1979/80: Central Districts
- 1980/81–1984/85: Wellington
- 1985/86–1987/88: North Shore

Career statistics
Competition	WTest	WODI	WFC	WLA
Matches	3	13	34	30
Runs scored	–	31	433	68
Batting average	–	5.16	14.43	7.55
100s/50s	–	0/0	0/0	0/0
Top score	–	8	49*	18*
Balls bowled	546	702	4,464	1,710
Wickets	4	12	101	33
Bowling average	52.50	24.50	16.89	19.69
5 wickets in innings	0	0	7	0
10 wickets in match	0	0	0	0
Best bowling	2/61	3/21	6/28	4/25
Catches/stumpings	0/–	2/–	5/–	5/–
- Source: CricketArchive, 2 August 2021

Linda Mary Fraser (born 30 October 1953) is a New Zealand former cricketer who played as a left-arm medium bowler. She appeared in 3 Test matches and 13 One Day Internationals for New Zealand between 1982 and 1987. She played domestic cricket for Auckland, Central Districts, Wellington and North Shore.
