= Lyn Fullston =

Australian cricketer

Personal information
- Full name: Lynette Ann Fullston
- Born: 3 March 1956; Karoonda, South Australia
- Died: 1 June 2008 (aged 52); Adelaide, South Australia
- Nickname: Lefty
- Batting: Left-handed
- Bowling: Slow left-arm orthodox
- Role: All-rounder

International information
- National side: Australia (1985–1988)
- Test debut (cap 99): 21 January 1984 v India
- Last Test: 29 August 1987 v England
- ODI debut (cap 26): 10 January 1982 v India
- Last ODI: 18 December 1988 v England

Domestic team information
- Years: Team
- 1978/79–1992/93: South Australia

Career statistics
Competition	WTest	WODI	WFC	WLA
Matches	12	41	47	83
Runs scored	285	134	669	375
Batting average	31.66	16.75	23.89	14.42
100s/50s	0/0	0/0	0/1	0/0
Top score	41*	27	52*	27
Balls bowled	3,610	2,366	8,725	4,345
Wickets	41	73	157	148
Bowling average	25.53	13.26	16.61	12.22
5 wickets in innings	0	2	7	6
10 wickets in match	0	0	1	0
Best bowling	4/53	5/27	7/35	7/3
Catches/stumpings	20/–	18/–	46/–	33/–
- Source: CricketArchive, 24 January 2023

Lynette Ann Fullston (3 March 1956 – 1 June 2008) was an Australian cricketer and netballer. In cricket, she played as a slow left-arm orthodox bowler and left-handed batter. She appeared in 12 Test matches and 41 One Day Internationals for Australia between 1982 and 1988. Her final international appearance was in the final of the 1988 Women's Cricket World Cup. She played domestic cricket for South Australia. She also played netball for Australia.

== Cricket career ==
Fullston had a 15-year, 123-match career at first-class level, claiming 73 one-day international and 41 Test wickets, and twice took five wickets in an ODI innings with best figures of 5-27. A handy all-rounder, Fullston averaged 31.67 in Test cricket with a top score of 41 not out against England in 1987. Until 2013 she held the world record for most wickets (39) taken in World Cup matches by an individual female. She is currently third on that list. Fullston was the first woman cricketer to take two five-wicket hauls in Women's Cricket World Cup history She also has the record for taking the most number of wickets in a single Women's Cricket World Cup (23 wickets).

Fullston began her cricket career while at teacher's college, where peers and friends encouraged her to have a go. She started playing for Adelaide College of Advanced Education in 1977. She moved on to be captain/coach at Flinders Uni in 1982 and then to Eencee in the same role in 1988, before as a club they joined forces with Port Adelaide Cricket Club in 1994, where she played and coached until retiring in 2007. Under her eye Port became one of the most successful women's clubs in South Australia, becoming the first in history to win the premiership in all three grades in one season.

Fullston also coached at State level, coaching the 1985/86 South Australian Under 21 team, which won the National Championships.

Fullston taught in South Australia as a girls' Physical Education, Maths and Geography teacher for 28 years. She was an advocate for the construction of a new Gymnasium at Le Fevre High School where she taught; it was built, and named in her honor after her death.

Cricket Australia's chairman said after her death that Fullston was an ambassador for women's sport from community to international level.

She holds the record for delivering the most number of balls in a single Women's Test match (677). She also holds the record for delivering the most number of balls in an innings of a Women's Test match (407).

== Netball ==
Fullston represented Garville Netball Club, South Australia and the Australia national netball team. She was honoured with a life membership with Garville.

== Death and legacy ==
Fullston died on 1 June 2008 after a long illness. Her death was reported in the cricket world, but received little attention from the mainstream of South Australia's and Australia's media. This prompted Jenny Williams to begin the South Australian Women's Sport Network - a social media campaign to address the lack of media coverage and profile for South Australia's sports women.
