= Sally Griffiths =

Australian cricketer (born 1963)

Personal information
- Full name: Sally Jane Griffiths
- Born: 9 April 1963 (age 63); Newcastle, New South Wales, Australia
- Batting: Right-handed
- Bowling: Right-arm fast
- Role: All-rounder

International information
- National side: Australia (1985–1995)
- Test debut (cap 112): 1 August 1987 v England
- Last Test: 28 February 1995 v New Zealand
- ODI debut (cap 48): 8 February 1985 v New Zealand
- Last ODI: 20 February 1995 v New Zealand

Domestic team information
- Years: Team
- 1984/85–1999/00: New South Wales

Career statistics
Competition	WTest	WODI	WFC	WLA
Matches	7	32	31	105
Runs scored	204	309	748	1,458
Batting average	34.00	18.17	34.00	21.13
100s/50s	1/0	0/0	2/2	0/6
Top score	133	34	133	95
Balls bowled	615	831	3,069	2,745
Wickets	5	17	46	58
Bowling average	41.60	20.05	19.28	19.53
5 wickets in innings	0	0	0	1
10 wickets in match	0	0	0	0
Best bowling	0/0	3/17	4/19	5/14
Catches/stumpings	3/–	6/–	9/–	25/–
- Source: CricketArchive, 5 January 2023

Sally Jane Griffiths (born 9 April 1963) in an Australian former cricketer who played as an all-rounder, batting right-handed and bowling right-arm pace. She appeared in 7 Test matches and 32 One Day Internationals for Australia between 1985 and 1995. She scored one Test match century, against New Zealand in January 1990, and scored 309 runs and took 17 wickets at an average of 20.05 in ODIs. She played domestic cricket for New South Wales.

In April 2022, in recognition of her outstanding service to New South Wales as a player, Griffiths was inducted into the Cricket NSW Hall of Fame.
