= Ann McKenna =

New Zealand cricketer (1943–2025)

Personal information
- Full name: Ann McKenna
- Born: 27 October 1943; Christchurch, New Zealand
- Died: 24 January 2025 (aged 81); Nelson, New Zealand
- Batting: Right-handed
- Role: Batter

International information
- National side: New Zealand (1969–1987)
- Test debut (cap 58): 28 March 1969 v England
- Last Test: 17 March 1985 v India
- ODI debut (cap 35): 24 June 1984 v England
- Last ODI: 21 January 1987 v Australia

Domestic team information
- Years: Team
- 1961/62–1987/88: Canterbury

Career statistics
Competition	WTest	WODI	WFC	WLA
Matches	7	14	79	36
Runs scored	465	214	3,341	767
Batting average	35.76	16.46	30.37	28.40
100s/50s	0/3	0/0	3/16	1/4
Top score	97*	39	194*	113
Balls bowled	6	–	927	–
Wickets	0	–	15	–
Bowling average	–	–	27.80	–
5 wickets in innings	0	–	0	–
10 wickets in match	0	–	0	–
Best bowling	–	–	3/14	–
Catches/stumpings	7/–	0/–	25/–	25/–
- Source: CricketArchive, 3 November 2021

Ann McKenna (née Colville; 27 October 1943 – 24 January 2025) was a New Zealand cricketer and field hockey player. She first represented New Zealand at hockey, doing so twice in 1967 and 1971. In cricket, she played in seven Test matches and fourteen One Day Internationals for New Zealand between 1969 and 1987. She played domestic cricket for Canterbury.

McKenna played club cricket for St Albans, making a club record partnership of 242* with Vicki Burtt, with McKenna making 88* and Burtt making 148*. In 2005, she held the St Albans record for most appearances for the club, at 330.

She coached New Zealand at the 1993 and 1997 Women's Cricket World Cups, with the team finishing as runners-up on both occasions.

McKenna died in Nelson on 24 January 2025, at the age of 81.
