= Jackie Clark (cricketer) =

New Zealand cricketer (born 1963)

Personal information
- Full name: Jacqueline Clark
- Born: 14 March 1963 (age 63); New Plymouth, New Zealand
- Batting: Left-handed
- Bowling: Right-arm medium
- Role: Batter

International information
- National side: New Zealand (1984–1992)
- Test debut (cap 82): 14 July 1984 v England
- Last Test: 12 February 1992 v England
- ODI debut (cap 39): 7 February 1985 v Australia
- Last ODI: 23 January 1992 v Australia

Domestic team information
- Years: Team
- 1980/81–1989/90: Central Districts
- 1990/91–1994/95: Wellington

Career statistics
Competition	WTest	WODI	WFC	WLA
Matches	11	31	60	67
Runs scored	482	875	2,545	1,644
Batting average	26.77	29.16	29.59	24.90
100s/50s	0/2	0/7	2/11	0/12
Top score	79	85	119*	85
Balls bowled	6	–	270	12
Wickets	0	–	8	0
Bowling average	–	–	18.00	–
5 wickets in innings	0	–	0	0
10 wickets in match	0	–	0	0
Best bowling	–	–	3/2	–
Catches/stumpings	7/–	5/–	19/–	11/–
- Source: CricketArchive, 6 May 2021

Jacqueline Clark (born 14 March 1963) is a New Zealand former cricketer who played as a left-handed opening batter. She appeared in 11 Test matches and 31 One Day Internationals for New Zealand between 1984 and 1992, including playing for New Zealand at the 1988 Women's Cricket World Cup. She played domestic cricket for Central Districts and Wellington.

On her Test debut, against England in 1984, Clark was New Zealand's top scorer, with 79 in the second innings. When Australia played a three-match series of one-day matches in New Zealand in January 1986, Clark top-scored for New Zealand in every match, with 81, 59 and 36 not out. She was one of the leading scorers at the 1988 Women's World Cup, with 266 runs at an average of 44.33, including 85 against The Netherlands and 76 against Ireland.
