= Lesley Murdoch =

Cricketer and field hockey player

Lesley Murdoch ONZM MBE
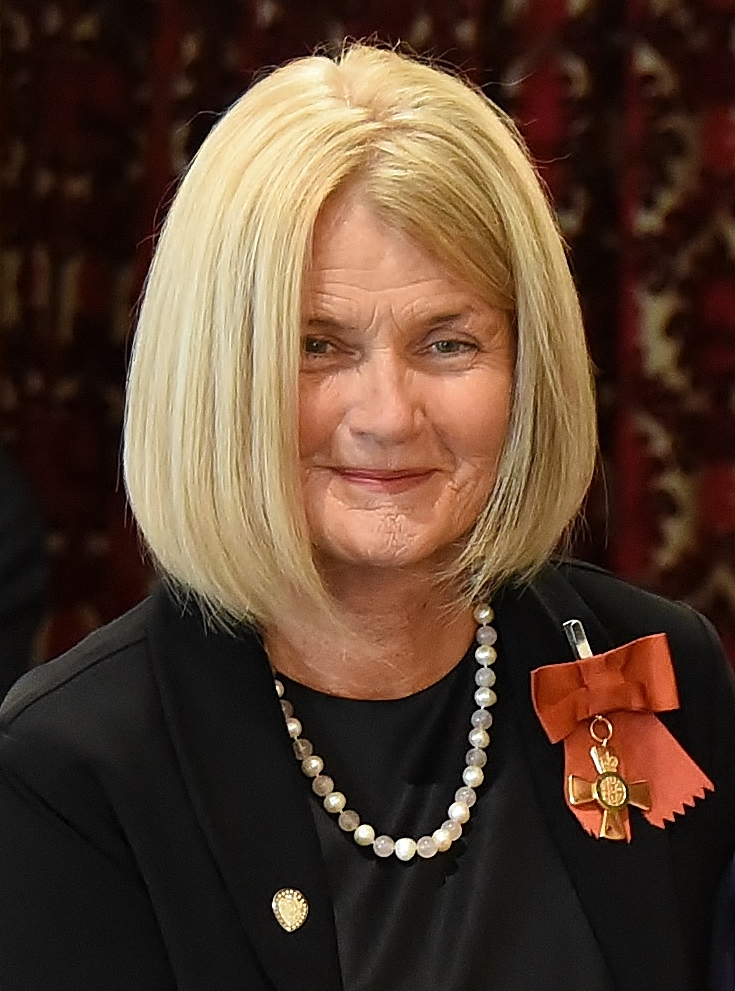
- Murdoch in 2016

Personal information
- Full name: Lesley Jean Murdoch
- Born: 18 March 1956 (age 70); Christchurch, New Zealand
- Batting: Right-handed
- Bowling: Right-arm off break
- Role: Batter

International information
- National side: New Zealand (1979–1990)
- Test debut (cap 73): 12 January 1979 v Australia
- Last Test: 1 February 1990 v Australia
- ODI debut (cap 28): 10 January 1982 v England
- Last ODI: 11 February 1990 v Australia

Domestic team information
- Years: Team
- 1975/76–1990/91: Canterbury

Career statistics
Competition	WTest	WODI	WFC	WLA
Matches	6	25	56	51
Runs scored	253	417	2,280	1,172
Batting average	25.30	21.94	37.37	27.90
100s/50s	0/1	0/1	0/18	1/6
Top score	72	69	96	117
Balls bowled	–	–	24	16
Wickets	–	–	0	0
Bowling average	–	–	–	–
5 wickets in innings	–	–	0	0
10 wickets in match	–	–	0	0
Best bowling	–	–	–	–
Catches/stumpings	1/–	4/–	18/–	8/–
- Source: CricketArchive, 3 August 2021

Lesley Jean Murdoch ONZM MBE (née Shankland; born 18 March 1956) is a New Zealand former cricketer and field hockey player. Between 1979 and 1990 she appeared in 6 Test matches and 25 One Day Internationals for New Zealand as a batter. Murdoch also captained New Zealand in three Tests, drawing two and losing one, and fifteen One Day Internationals, winning eight and losing six, with one no result. She played domestic cricket for Canterbury. In hockey, she was a member of the New Zealand team that finished sixth at the 1984 Los Angeles Olympics.

In the 1987 New Year Honours, Murdoch was made a Member of the Order of the British Empire, for services to cricket and hockey. In the 2016 Queen's Birthday Honours, she was appointed an Officer of the New Zealand Order of Merit for services to sport.

At the 128th AGM of New Zealand Cricket in November 2022 Murdoch was elected president of the organisation.

Murdoch is currently a commentator for Sky Network Television calling netball, hockey and cricket. She also is a sideline reporter for Radio Sport during rugby matches at AMI Stadium and hosts a Saturday morning sports show on Christchurch's Newstalk ZB.

She is also a commentator for the OBS.
