= Ruth Buckstein =

Australian cricketer (born 1955)

Personal information
- Full name: Ruth Buckstein
- Born: 28 July 1955 (age 71); Melbourne, Australia
- Batting: Right-handed
- Bowling: Right arm medium
- Role: Batter

International information
- National side: Australia (1986–1988)
- Only Test (cap 114): 29 August 1987 v England
- ODI debut (cap 51): 23 January 1986 v New Zealand
- Last ODI: 18 December 1988 v England

Domestic team information
- Years: Team
- 1978/79–1987/88: Victoria

Career statistics
Competition	WTest	WODI	WFC	WLA
Matches	1	16	26	43
Runs scored	85	511	957	1,136
Batting average	42.50	42.58	34.17	31.55
100s/50s	0/1	2/1	1/6	2/4
Top score	83	105*	121*	105*
Balls bowled	–	–	42	–
Wickets	–	–	1	–
Bowling average	–	–	19.00	–
5 wickets in innings	–	–	0	–
10 wickets in match	–	–	0	–
Best bowling	–	–	1/2	–
Catches/stumpings	0/–	2/–	9/–	4/–
- Source: CricketArchive, 4 January 2023

Ruth Buckstein (born 28 July 1955) is an Australian former cricketer who played as a right-handed batter. She appeared in one Test match and 16 One Day Internationals for Australia between 1986 and 1988. She played domestic cricket for Victoria.

== Early life ==
Buckstein played softball for the Victorian state team before her first club cricket match appearance in 1973. At the time, Buckstein was an undergraduate student at Monash University.

== Cricket career ==
A right-handed batter, Buckstein played one Test match and 16 WODIs, including scoring two WODI centuries. Her final WODI appearance was in the final of the 1988 Women's Cricket World Cup, which was won by Australia.

Buckstein played as an opener. As of 2014 Buckstein and Julien Wiener are the only Jewish Australians to have represented Australia in Test cricket.

== One Day International centuries ==
Runs	Match	Opponents	City	Venue	Year
100	10	Netherlands	Perth, Australia	Willetton Sports Club (No. 1 Oval)	1988
105*	15	Netherlands	Melbourne, Australia	Carey Grammar School Oval No.2	1988

- Source: CricInfo
