= Liz Signal =

New Zealand cricketer (born 1962)

Personal information
- Full name: Elizabeth Ann Signal
- Born: 4 May 1962 (age 64); Feilding, New Zealand
- Batting: Right-handed
- Bowling: Right-arm medium
- Role: Bowler
- Relatives: Rose Signal (twin sister)

International information
- National side: New Zealand (1984–1988)
- Test debut (cap 79): 6 July 1984 v England
- Last Test: 17 March 1985 v India
- ODI debut (cap 37): 30 June 1984 v England
- Last ODI: 25 January 1988 v Australia

Domestic team information
- Years: Team
- 1979/80–1988/89: Central Districts

Career statistics
Competition	WTest	WODI	WFC	WLA
Matches	6	19	41	47
Runs scored	82	79	455	325
Batting average	20.50	11.28	14.67	12.03
100s/50s	0/1	0/0	0/1	0/0
Top score	55*	28*	55*	28*
Balls bowled	606	783	4,628	2,338
Wickets	8	7	122	58
Bowling average	40.62	70.71	17.68	21.24
5 wickets in innings	0	0	4	0
10 wickets in match	0	0	1	0
Best bowling	2/34	2/26	6/22	4/35
Catches/stumpings	3/–	5/–	15/–	13/–
- Source: CricketArchive, 7 May 2021

Elizabeth Ann Signal (born 4 May 1962) is a New Zealand former cricketer who played as a right-arm medium bowler. She appeared in 6 Test matches and 19 One Day Internationals for New Zealand between 1984 and 1988. She played domestic cricket for Central Districts.

Her twin sister Rose also played cricket for New Zealand. They were the first twins to play test cricket together.
