= Jeanette Dunning =

New Zealand cricketer (born 1957)

Personal information
- Full name: Jeanette Rose Dunning
- Born: 4 March 1957 (age 69); Wellsford, New Zealand
- Batting: Right-handed
- Bowling: Right-arm off break
- Role: All-rounder

International information
- National side: New Zealand (1984–1988)
- Test debut (cap 75): 6 July 1984 v England
- Last Test: 17 March 1985 v India
- ODI debut (cap 33): 24 June 1984 v England
- Last ODI: 25 January 1988 v Australia

Domestic team information
- Years: Team
- 1975/76: Auckland
- 1976/77–1989/90: North Shore

Career statistics
Competition	WTest	WODI	WFC	WLA
Matches	6	22	57	52
Runs scored	320	346	1,951	1,081
Batting average	32.00	20.35	27.87	27.02
100s/50s	0/2	0/1	0/10	0/4
Top score	71	89	95	91
Balls bowled	390	942	3,900	2,543
Wickets	6	13	122	51
Bowling average	28.33	40.53	14.93	23.88
5 wickets in innings	0	0	2	1
10 wickets in match	0	0	0	0
Best bowling	2/16	3/29	5/9	6/13
Catches/stumpings	5/–	4/–	19/–	12/–
- Source: CricketArchive, 17 July 2021

Jeanette Rose Dunning (born 4 March 1957) is a New Zealand former cricketer who played as an all-rounder, batting right-handed and bowling right-arm off break. She appeared in 6 Test matches and 22 One Day Internationals for New Zealand between 1984 and 1988. She played domestic cricket for Auckland and North Shore.
