= Ingrid Jagersma =

New Zealand cricketer (born 1959)

Personal information
- Full name: Ingrid Catriena Petronella Jagersma
- Born: 8 May 1959 (age 67); Christchurch, New Zealand
- Batting: Right-handed
- Bowling: Right-arm off break
- Role: Wicket-keeper

International information
- National side: New Zealand (1984–1990)
- Test debut (cap 77): 6 July 1984 v England
- Last Test: 1 February 1990 v Australia
- ODI debut (cap 34): 24 June 1984 v England
- Last ODI: 11 February 1990 v Australia

Domestic team information
- Years: Team
- 1975/76–1977/78: Canterbury
- 1980/81–1989/90: North Shore
- 1990/91: Canterbury
- 1992/93: North Harbour

Career statistics
Competition	WTest	WODI	WFC	WLA
Matches	9	34	52	67
Runs scored	271	453	1,408	783
Batting average	33.87	19.69	26.56	17.40
100s/50s	0/1	0/2	0/6	0/2
Top score	52	58*	98	58*
Balls bowled	54	132	300	272
Wickets	4	4	12	10
Bowling average	9.50	12.00	10.50	13.20
5 wickets in innings	0	0	1	0
10 wickets in match	0	0	0	0
Best bowling	4/38	2/14	7/20	3/5
Catches/stumpings	10/2	24/9	58/21	44/27
- Source: CricketArchive, 15 April 2021

Ingrid Catriena Petronella Jagersma (born 8 May 1959) is a New Zealand former cricketer who played as a wicket-keeper and right-handed batter. She appeared in 9 Test matches and 34 One Day Internationals for New Zealand between 1984 and 1990. She captained New Zealand in one ODI, which was won. She played domestic cricket for Canterbury, North Shore and North Harbour.
