= Jill Kennare =

Australian cricketer

Personal information
- Full name: Jill Kennare
- Born: 16 August 1956 (age 70); Glenelg, South Australia
- Batting: Right-handed
- Bowling: Right-arm medium
- Role: Batter

International information
- National side: Australia (1979–1987)
- Test debut (cap 91): 12 January 1979 v New Zealand
- Last Test: 25 January 1985 v England
- ODI debut (cap 28): 10 January 1982 v India
- Last ODI: 21 January 1987 v New Zealand

Domestic team information
- Years: Team
- 1977/78–1986/87: South Australia

Career statistics
Competition	WTest	WODI	WFC	WLA
Matches	12	19	38	30
Runs scored	702	789	1,889	1,049
Batting average	36.94	46.41	42.93	38.85
100s/50s	3/2	2/3	5/9	2/5
Top score	131	122	131	122
Balls bowled	102	–	204	313
Wickets	1	–	4	4
Bowling average	23.00	–	17.75	25.50
5 wickets in innings	0	–	0	0
10 wickets in match	0	–	0	0
Best bowling	1/0	–	3/20	2/23
Catches/stumpings	2/–	2/–	20/–	6/–
- Source: CricketArchive, 8 February 2023

Jill Kennare (16 August 1956) is an Australian former cricketer who played as a right-handed batter. She appeared in 12 Test matches and 19 One Day Internationals for Australia between 1979 and 1987, including captaining the side on their 1984 tour of India. She played domestic cricket for South Australia.

In 1985, Kennare and Denise Emerson hit a record partnership for Australia against the England women's cricket team of 176 runs for the third wicket. The record was surpassed in 2001 by Belinda Clark and Joanne Broadbent who shared an opening partnership of 197 runs against England. In late January 1985, Kennare hit the winning run in the third and final match of the 1984-1985 Women's Ashes, which was Australia's first series win against England since 1949.

== International centuries ==
Kennare scored three centuries in Test matches and two in One Day Internationals.

=== Test centuries ===
Century	Runs	Opponents	Location	Venue	Year
1	131	India	Ahmedabad, India	Sardar Vallabhbhai Patel Stadium	1984
2	103	England	Perth, Australia	WACA Ground	1984
3	104	England	Bendigo, Australia	Queen Elizabeth Oval	1985

=== One Day International centuries ===
Century	Runs	Opponents	Location	Venue	Year
1	122	England	Melbourne, Australia	Aberfeldie Park	1985
2	100 not out	England	Melbourne, Australia	Aberfeldie Park	1985

== Other sports ==
In addition to cricket, Kennare was an accomplished lacrosse player, representing Australia in 1980 and 1981 and was a member of the team to first defeat the United States when they did so in 1981.
