= England women's cricket team in Australia in 1984–85 =

English women's cricket team in Australia in 1984–85
	Australia	England
- Dates: 7 December 1984 – 3 February 1985
Captains	Sharon Tredrea (1st Test); Raelee Thompson	Jan Southgate

Test series
- Result: Australia won the 5-match series 2–1
Most runs	Denise Emerson (453)	Jan Brittin (429)
Most wickets	Debbie Wilson; Lyn Fullston (19)	Avril Starling (21)

One Day International series
- Results: Australia won the 3-match series 3–0
Most runs	Jill Kennare (237)	Carole Hodges (88)
Most wickets	Karen Price (8)	Janet Aspinall (5)

The English women's cricket team toured Australia between 7 December 1984 and 3 February 1985 to contest The Women's Ashes for the ninth time. Australia won the five match Test series 2–1 to claim the Ashes for the first time since 1963.

A three match WODI series was also played where Australia won 3–0. Prior to and in between the Test matches, England played 11 tour matches – winning 6, losing 3, drawing 1 and 1 ended in no result.

== Tour matches ==
=== 50-over match: Western Australia Women vs England Women ===
7 December 1984
Scorecard

England; 7/121 (50 overs)	v	Western Australia; 123 (48.1 overs)
Jan Brittin 50; Peta Verco 3/28 (10 overs)		Peta Verco 57; Carole Hodges 2/24 (7 overs)

Western Australia Women won by 5 wickets
Rosalie Park, Perth
Umpires: R. Gates (Aus) and Don Weser (Aus)

- England Women won the toss and elected to bat.

=== 50-over match: Western Australia Women vs England Women ===
9 December 1984
Scorecard

England; 7/127 (50 overs)	v	Western Australia; 2/128 (45.2 overs)
Jan Southgate 42; Tania Meintanis 2/12 (4 overs)		Peta Verco 40; Carole Hodges 2/19 (8 overs)

Western Australia Women won by 8 wickets
Rosalie Park, Perth
Umpires: Graham Bibby (Aus) and B. Robertson (Aus)

- Western Australia Women won the toss and elected to field.

=== 50-over match: Western Australia Women vs England Women ===
10 December 1984
Scorecard

Western Australia; 7/115 (50 overs)	v	England; 9/119 (50 overs)
Carol Caporn 23 (65); Jacqueline Court 2/20 (10 overs)		Megan Lear 37 (87); Tania Meintanis 3/16 (9 overs)

England Women won by 1 wicket
Rosalie Park, Perth
Umpires: R. Gates (Aus) and Terry Prue (Aus)

- England Women won the toss and elected to field.

=== 60-over match: South Australia Women vs England Women ===
19 December 1984
Scorecard

England; 130 (55.4 overs)	v	South Australia; 8/123 (60 overs)
Chris Watmough 46 (69); Lee-Anne Hunter 4/7 (9.4 overs)		Robbie Ellis 29* (82); Gillian McConway 3/21 (12 overs)

England Women won by 7 runs
Thebarton Oval, Adelaide

- England Women won the toss and elected to bat.

=== 60-over match: Queensland Women vs England Women ===
29 December 1984
Scorecard

England; 5/99 (47 overs)	v	Queensland
Megan Lear 45; Ailsa Rowell 3/15 (12 overs)

No result
St Joseph's College, Brisbane

- England Women won the toss and elected to bat.

=== 60-over match: Queensland Women vs England Women ===
30 December 1984
Scorecard

England; 5/202 (60 overs)	v	Queensland; 7/145 (60 overs)
Carole Hodges 65; Sharon Wass 1/24 (10 overs)		Lyn Hughes (47); Jacqueline Court 2/18 (5 overs)

England Women won by 57 runs
St Joseph's College, Brisbane

- England Women won the toss and elected to bat.

=== 2-day match: New South Wales Women vs England Women ===
7–8 January 1985
Scorecard

New South Wales	v	England
222 (104.2 overs); Lyn Larsen 51 (158); Janet Aspinall 2/23 (18.2 overs)		9d/129 (70.1 overs); Janet Aspinall 35 (123); Sally Griffiths 3/8 (14 overs)
1d/30 (8.2 overs); Lisa Davies 24 (34); Susan Metcalfe 1/19 (4.2 overs)		4/78 (29 overs); Carole Hodges 51 (78); Sally Griffiths 2/12 (9 overs)

Match drawn
Pratten Park, Sydney

- New South Wales Women won the toss and elected to bat.

=== 50-over match: New South Wales Country Women vs England Women ===
10 January 1985
Scorecard

New South Wales Country; 9/113 (50 overs)	v	England; 6/114 (49.1 overs)
S. McMicking 28; Jacqueline Court 4/25 (10 overs)		Jan Brittin 28; D. Scurr 2/18 (7 overs)

England Women won by 4 wickets
Primary Club Field, Dooralong

- New South Wales Country Women won the toss and elected to bat.

=== 55-over match: Australian Women's Cricket Council President's XI vs England Women ===
17 January 1985
Scorecard

Australian Women's Cricket Council President's XI (Australia); 182 (54.2 overs)	v	England; 5/183 (54.2 overs)
Lynette Cook 42 (97); Gillian McConway 2/31 (11 overs)		Jane Powell 53* (87); Marie Cornish 2/20 (11 overs)

England Women won by 5 wickets
Manuka Oval, Canberra
Umpires: BC Richings

- Australian Women's Cricket Council President's XI won the toss and elected to bat.

=== 55-over match: Victoria Women vs England Women ===
20 January 1985
Scorecard

Victoria (Victoria (state)); 9/127 (55 overs)	v	England; 2/128 (48.4 overs)
Karen Brown 43* (38); Jan Brittin 3/5 (11 overs)		Carole Hodges 53 (94); Leah Gallagher 1/24 (11 overs)

England Women won by 8 wickets
Aberfeldie Park, Melbourne
Umpires: Adrian Grant

- Victoria Women won the toss and elected to bat.

=== 55-over match: Victoria Women vs England Women ===
21 January 1985
Scorecard

England; 136 (52.5 overs)	v	(Victoria (state)) Victoria; 6/139 (50.4 overs)
Jan Southgate 47 (95); Karen Brown 3/29 (10.5 overs)		Wendy Napier 35 (80); Carole Hodges 2/27 (8 overs)

Victoria Women won by 4 wickets
Aberfeldie Park, Melbourne
Umpires: Adrian Grant

- Victoria Women won the toss and elected to field.

== Test series ==
=== 1st Test ===
13–16 December 1984
Scorecard

England	v	Australia
290 (133.1 overs); Jacqueline Court 90 (149); Lyn Fullston 4/61 (40.1 overs)		251 (118.3 overs); Denise Emerson 84 (238); Avril Starling 3/40 (32 overs)
9d/242 (105 overs); Jan Brittin 112 (162); Raelee Thompson 4/47 (20 overs)		8/209 (80 overs); Jill Kennare 103 (165); Helen Stother 2/44 (13 overs)

Match drawn
WACA Ground, Perth
Umpires: Peter McConnell (Aus) and Donald Weser (Aus)

- England Women won the toss and elected to bat.
- Denise Emerson and Debbie Wilson (Aus) made their women's Test debut.

=== 2nd Test ===
21–24 December 1984
Scorecard

England	v	Australia
91 (67.4 overs); Jan Brittin 22 (39); Karen Price 4/22 (17 overs)		262 (119 overs); Denise Emerson 121 (329); Gillian McConway 4/32 (27 overs)
296 (174.1 overs); Chris Watmough 70 (123); Lyn Fullston 4/96 (54 overs)		120 (65.5 overs); Karen Price 51 (74); Avril Starling 5/36 (16.5 overs)

England Women won by 5 runs
Adelaide Oval, Adelaide
Umpires: Tony Crafter (Aus) and Max O'Connell (Aus)

- England Women won the toss and elected to bat.

=== 3rd Test ===
1–4 January 1985
Scorecard

England	v	Australia
275 (152 overs); Jan Southgate 74 (160); Lyn Larsen 4/33 (21 overs)		9d/326 (166 overs); Denise Emerson 84 (264); Avril Starling 4/50 (36 overs)
7/204 (120 overs); Carole Hodges 95 (244); Raelee Thompson 2/25 (15 overs)

Match drawn
The Gabba, Brisbane
Umpires: Michael King (Aus) and Colin Timmins (Aus)

- England Women won the toss and elected to bat.
- Wendy Napier (Aus) made her women's Test debut.

=== 4th Test ===
12–15 January 1985
Scorecard

Australia	v	England
8d/232 (110 overs); Denise Emerson 58 (186); Gillian McConway 3/39 (26 overs)		140 (81.1 overs); Jan Brittin 45 (122); Denise Martin 4/24 (19 overs)
9d/153 (95 overs); Raelee Thompson 24* (98); Avril Starling 4/57 (26 overs)		128 (106 overs); Jan Brittin 65 (280); Lyn Fullston 4/53 (25 overs)

Australia Women won by 117 runs
Grahame Park, Gosford
Umpires: Alf Debnam (Aus) and Don Gray (Aus)

- England Women won the toss and elected to field.

=== 5th Test ===
25–28 January 1985
Scorecard

England	v	Australia
196 (109.1 overs); Jan Southgate 59 (158); Raelee Thompson 5/33 (28 overs)		8d/285 (122.1 overs); Jill Kennare 104 (204); Gillian McConway 2/52 (28.1 overs)
204 (141.4 overs); Jacqueline Court 41 (131); Peta Verco 3/30 (24.4 overs)		3/118 (50 overs); Jill Kennare 42 (49); Jan Brittin 1/11 (3 overs)

Australia Women won by 7 wickets
Queen Elizabeth Oval, Bendigo
Umpires: Michael Gandy (Aus) and Angelo Nicosia (Aus)

- England Women won the toss and elected to bat.

== WODI series ==
=== 1st WODI ===
31 January 1985
Scorecard

Australia; 6/169 (57 overs)	v	England; 163 (56.2 overs)
Denise Emerson 70 (162); Janet Aspinall 2/16 (10 overs)		Jan Brittin 73 (113); Denise Martin 2/19 (12 overs)

Australia Women won by 6 runs
South Melbourne Cricket Ground, Melbourne
Umpires: Robin Baillache (Aus) and Graham Bugge (Aus)

- Australia Women won the toss and elected to bat.
- Debbie Wilson (Aus) and Jan Southgate (Eng) both made their WODI debut.
- The match was reduced before play started to 57 overs per side.

=== 2nd WODI ===
2 February 1985
Scorecard

Australia; 7/253 (59 overs)	v	England; 115 (47.1 overs)
Jill Kennare 122 (139); Janet Aspinall 3/48 (12 overs)		June Edney 35 (72); Denise Martin 3/8 (7.1 overs)

Australia Women won by 138 runs
Aberfeldie Park, Melbourne
Umpires: Daryl Holt (Aus) and Alan Richardson (Aus)

- Australia Women won the toss and elected to bat.
- The match was reduced to 59 overs per side.
- Jill Kennare (Aus) made her maiden women's ODI century.

=== 3rd WODI ===
3 February 1985
Scorecard

England; 9/157 (60 overs)	v	Australia; 1/158 (46.5 overs)
Jacqueline Court 45 (98); Karen Price 3/15 (12 overs)		Jill Kennare 100* (149); Avril Starling 1/15 (9 overs)

Australia Women won by 9 wickets
Aberfeldie Park, Melbourne
Umpires: Dan Bomford (Aus) and David Holden (Aus)

- England Women won the toss and elected to bat.
- Wendy Napier (Aus) and Susan Metcalfe (Eng) both made their WODI debut.
