= Perth Cricket Club =

- League: Western Australian Grade Cricket

Team information
- City: Perth
- Founded: May 1862
- Home ground: Fletcher Park
- Official website: https://perthcc.com

Perth Cricket Club is a cricket team based in Perth, Western Australia. The club competes in the Western Australian Grade Cricket (Premier cricket) competition.

== History ==
The club was officially formed on 23 May 1862. at a meeting held at the Freemason's Hotel, on the corner of St Georges Tce and William St. Mr James B. Roe (son of John Septimus Roe) was the first chairman and captain of the club.

The club is a founding member in the formation of Western Australian Cricket Association in 1885.

There is some evidence of games being played prior to 1862. Newspaper articles speak of members of the Perth Cricket club meeting in 1839, each Saturday at The Flats, near where the Supreme Court Gardens are to this day. On Easter Eve 1839 the Perth Cricket Club defeated Guildford in a ‘stirring struggle’ by 40 runs. Games were held in 1846 between the Tradesmen of Perth v Perth Club.

In 1871 the Weld Club was established in Perth by ‘members of the establishment of Perth’. Many of the members of the Weld Club were also members of the Metropolitan's Cricket Club, and matches would be held between the ‘Weld Club’ versus the ‘World’. Sir Walter James was a prominent figure of the time, being Premier of WA, president of the Weld Club in the early 1930s, and he also served as president of the East Perth (Perth) cricket club for two seasons from 1908 to 1910.

In March 1878, a meeting was held to approve the merger of the Perth and Metropolitans Clubs. Strong consideration was given to using the name Perth Cricket Club, but the name Metropolitans was decided to be the name of the club going forward. Mr J.C.H. James moved a motion (that was subsequently withdrawn) that whatever name is used, the club should be generally referred to as the “Perth Club”. Mr J.H. Thomas was elected chairman and Mr James the club captain.

The WA Cricket Association was formed in November 1885. The Metropolitans club was mainly instrumental in its formation. George Parker, captain of Metropolitans, was chairman of the first W.A.C.A. committee. P.L. (Percy) Hussey of Metropolitans would serve as secretary of the committee. Metropolitans win the inaugural first grade premiership, under the leadership of club president George Randell.

Notable office bearers in the early days include Sir Stephen Parker Chief Justice WA and his brother George (of Parker and Parker law firm), who both serve as president of the club. Sir John Forrest and Septimus Burt both occupied a time as the club vice president. Another prominent politician, Sir Walter Kingsmill, was president for four seasons.

With the introduction of electorate cricket in 1899, the Metropolitans/Perth club became the East Perth Cricket Club in the new seven team competition. At the turn of the 20th century, the leading batsman in WA cricket was undoubtedly Ernie Parker. Several of his records remain to this day, including his 246 at the WACA against East Fremantle in 1903. He still holds the club 2nd and 3rd wicket partnership records.

East Perth won numerous premierships in its early years. It won the first grade premiership on nine occasions from 1899 to 1925, which was the final year of a hat-trick of flags. Its final premiership under the East Perth name was in the 1948–49 season under Captain Keith Carmody. In 1955, the club changed name from East Perth back to the original Perth name, whilst still playing home matches at the WACA Ground. In 1958, with Sheffield Shield cricket now restricting playing access to the WACA, the club moved to Lathlain Park.

In 1968 the club relocated to its current ground, Fletcher Park in Carlisle. Perth played its first A grade game at Fletcher Park on 12 October versus North Perth. In 2018, the club marked 50 years of Western Australian Grade Cricket played at Fletcher Park.

Australian Test match representatives, whilst playing at Perth, are Dennis Lillee, Rod Marsh and Adam Gilchrist

=== Team of the century ===
In November 2012, the club recognised its 150th year since formation. At a function held at the club a Team of the Century comprising the best players of the past one hundred years was announced. The team is Paul Terry, Ron Sarre, Bert Rigg (capt.), Basil Rigg, Adam Gilchrist, Luke Ronchi, Leo Bott, Allan Evans, Dennis Lillee, Bob Paulsen, Harry Price and Harry Gorringe. Gordon Becker was named coach.
