= Harry Gorringe =

Australian cricketer

Personal information
- Full name: Harrison Reginald Gorringe
- Born: 7 March 1928; Carlisle, Western Australia
- Died: 25 June 2017 (aged 89); Cottesloe, Western Australia
- Batting: Right-handed
- Bowling: Right-arm fast-medium
- Role: Bowler

Domestic team information
- Years: Team
- 1951/52–1958/59: Western Australia

Career statistics
Competition	First-class
Matches	28
Runs scored	228
Batting average	7.12
100s/50s	0/0
Top score	25
Balls bowled	5,942
Wickets	89
Bowling average	34.88
5 wickets in innings	2
10 wickets in match	1
Best bowling	8/56
Catches/stumpings	12/–
- Source: Cricket Archive, 4 January 2016

Harrison Reginald Gorringe (7 March 1928 – 25 June 2017) was a first-class cricketer who played for Western Australia from 1951 to 1958.

A right-arm fast-medium bowler, Gorringe was a regular member of the West Australian team for eight seasons. His best performance came in the Sheffield Shield in 1952-53 when he took 3 for 82 and 8 for 56 against Queensland at the WACA in Perth. He began the Queensland second innings by taking four wickets before conceding a run, and later took three wickets in one over.

In a long career at Perth Cricket Club, Gorringe took 550 wickets from 1945 to 1962. He is a member of the Perth CC Team of the Century.
