= Bob Paulson =

Bob Paulson may refer to:

- Bob Paulson (police commissioner) (born 1958), commissioner of the Royal Canadian Mounted Police
- Bob Paulson (politician) (fl. 2020s), member of the North Dakota Senate
- Bob Paulson (speedway rider) (1942–1982), English motorcycle speedway rider

== See also ==
- Robert Paulson, a character in the 1996 novel and 1999 film, Fight Club
- Bob Paulsen (born 1947), Australian cricketer
- Rob Paulsen (born 1956), American voice actor and voice director
