= Bert Rigg =

Australian cricketer

Personal information
- Full name: Herbert William Hardy Rigg
- Born: 18 August 1923; Highgate, Western Australia
- Died: 16 March 2015 (aged 91); Perth, Western Australia
- Batting: Right-handed
- Bowling: Leg-spin
- Role: Batsman
- Relatives: Basil Rigg (brother)

Domestic team information
- Years: Team
- 1946/47–1958/59: Western Australia

Career statistics
Competition	First-class
Matches	12
Runs scored	431
Batting average	23.94
100s/50s	0/1
Top score	76
Balls bowled	216
Wickets	2
Bowling average	56.50
5 wickets in innings	0
10 wickets in match	0
Best bowling	1/13
Catches/stumpings	12/–
- Source: Cricinfo, 25 March 2016

Herbert William Hardy Rigg (18 August 1923 – 16 March 2015) was an Australian cricketer. He played twelve first-class matches for Western Australia between 1946 and 1959.

Rigg had a long association with the Perth Cricket Club, playing from 1939–40 to 1965–66 in a club record 284 matches, scoring 9,005 runs with eight centuries. In 1951-52, Rigg (90) and Ron Sarre (191) put on a club record opening partnership of 215 against Nedlands at the WACA Ground.

Later he was one of Western Australia's leading cricket administrators. He served as chairman of the state's Cricket Council, and as state delegate to the Australian Cricket Board.

Rigg's brother Basil also played cricket for Western Australia in the Sheffield Shield. Their sister Marjorie and their mother represented Western Australia at hockey.
