= Basil Rigg =

Australian cricketer (1926–2025)

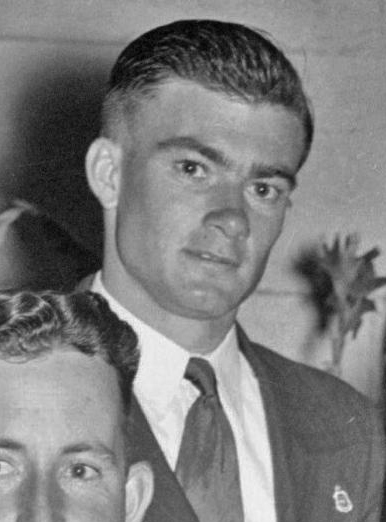
- Rigg in 1948

Personal information
- Full name: Basil Augustus Rigg
- Born: 12 August 1925; Highgate, Western Australia, Australia
- Died: 15 March 2025 (aged 99)
- Batting: Right-handed
- Bowling: Leg break
- Role: All-rounder
- Relatives: Bert Rigg (brother)

Domestic team information
- Years: Team
- 1947–48–1956–57: Western Australia

Career statistics
Competition	First-class
Matches	18
Runs scored	511
Batting average	17.03
100s/50s	0/2
Top score	65
Balls bowled	952
Wickets	8
Bowling average	86.12
5 wickets in innings	0
10 wickets in match	0
Best bowling	2/46
Catches/stumpings	11/–
- Source: CricketArchive, 29 May 2020

Basil Augustus Rigg (12 August 1925 – 15 March 2025) was an Australian cricketer who played for Western Australia in the Sheffield Shield.

== Life and career ==
The son of Herbert William Rigg (1896–1960) and Bertha Mary Rigg, nee Hardy (1895–1957), Basil Augustus Rigg was born at Nurse Harvey's Hospital in Bulwer street, Highgate on 12 August 1925.

Rigg attended Aquinas College, Perth, and was playing first-grade cricket while still at school. He played Australian rules football and was the leading goal-kicker for WANFL club Perth in 1943. The following year he enlisted in the Australian Army and served overseas. A rover, he had a stint at West Perth before returning to Perth after the war. Towards the end of the decade he gave up football so he could concentrate on his promising cricket career. He however still remained active outside of cricket by playing baseball, and was a state representative in the Claxton Shield.

An all-rounder, Rigg was a member of the Western Australian Sheffield Shield-winning team in 1947–48. He played in two matches, including their win over Queensland which secured the Shield for the first time in the state's history. Rigg's contribution towards a successful campaign was limited, with 34 runs in four innings and no wickets. In all first-class matches that summer, he took just three wickets with his leg spin, despite bowling over 500 balls. His bowling was used less frequently in future seasons. He scored both of his first-class half-centuries in 1947/48, and both against national teams. He scored 54 not out against the touring Indian team and also put in his best performance with the ball by dismissing two batsmen, including their best in Vijay Hazare. Playing against an Australian XI soon after, Rigg made 65 in the first innings, after initially retiring hurt on five. He also took the wicket of opener Bill Brown but conceded 65 runs in his six overs. It was perhaps his best match, as he had made his half-century against an attack featuring Keith Miller and four other bowlers who would later form part of "The Invincibles".

In a long and successful career with the Perth Cricket Club, Rigg was one of the finest all-rounders in the club's history. In 252 matches from 1941 to 1964 he scored over 8,200 runs and took 325 wickets. He was a Life Member and named in the Team of the Century at the 150th Anniversary function held in 2012.

Rigg's brother Bert also played cricket for Western Australia from 1946 to 1959. Their sister Marjorie and their mother represented Western Australia at hockey.

Rigg died on 15 March 2025, at the age of 99.
