= Bob Paulsen =

Australian cricketer (born 1947)

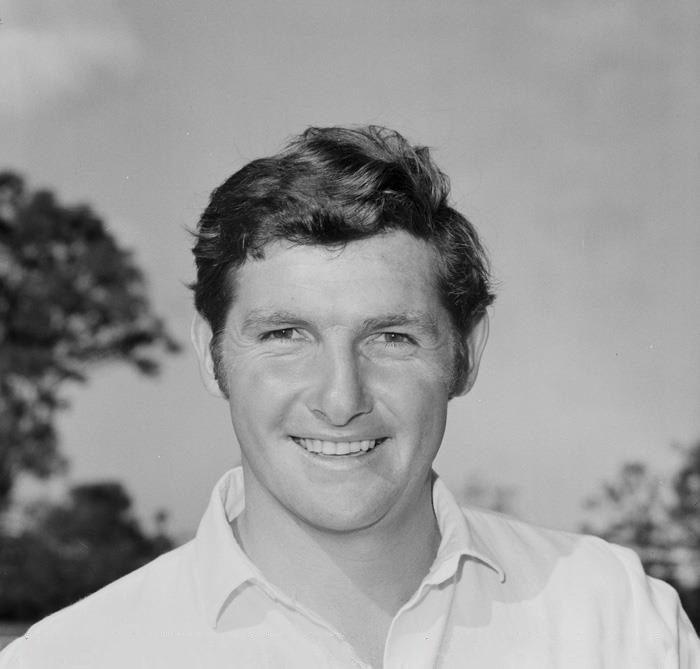
- Paulsen in 1971

Personal information
- Full name: Robert George Paulsen
- Born: 18 October 1947 (age 79); Brisbane, Queensland, Australia
- Batting: Right-handed
- Bowling: Right-arm leg-breaks and googlies
- Role: Bowler

Domestic team information
- Years: Team
- 1966–67 to 1971–72: Queensland
- 1973–74 to 1978–79: Western Australia

Career statistics
Competition	FC	List A
Matches	75	2
Runs scored	1053	12
Batting average	13.16	12.00
100s/50s	0/0	0/0
Top score	46	12
Balls bowled	12,991	112
Wickets	197	2
Bowling average	36.01	40.00
5 wickets in innings	7	0
10 wickets in match	0	0
Best bowling	8/71	1/39
Catches/stumpings	46/–	2/–
- Source: Cricket Archive, 1 November 2015

Robert George Paulsen (born 18 October 1947) is a former Australian cricketer who played first-class cricket from 1966 to 1978.

== First-class career ==
Paulsen was educated at Anglican Church Grammar School in East Brisbane. A leg-spinner, he made his first-class debut for Queensland in 1966–67 at the age of 19 and took 31 wickets at an average of 31.61, including 7 for 73 in the second innings against South Australia in Brisbane.

Paulsen was considered a contender for the 1968 tour of England, but his form in the 1967–68 season was not quite sufficient to justify his selection. He took 22 wickets at 39.40. He took 25 wickets in 1968–69, and 24 in 1969–70, but after that his form declined, and he lost his place in the Queensland team to Malcolm Francke.

Paulsen moved to Perth, and represented Western Australia regularly for three seasons. Against MCC in 1974–75 he took 7 for 41 to dismiss MCC for 177 after they had been set 298 to win in just over four hours. He had similar success the next season against the West Indians, taking his best figures of 8 for 71 as the West Indians chased 333 in 220 minutes and were dismissed for 217. With this form, Paulsen was considered a possible inclusion in the Australian side to play New Zealand and Pakistan in the 1976–77 Australian season. He was less successful in the Sheffield Shield, however, and after a few more matches in 1976–77 and 1977–78 he lost his place in the side.

== Later career ==
Playing for Perth, Paulsen was the leading bowler in Western Australian Grade Cricket in 1978–79 with 59 wickets, and again in 1981–82 with 70 wickets. Perth won the Toyota Cup 50-over competition in 1979–80, largely due to Paulsen's spell in the final played at the WACA Ground. He was named a member of the Team of the Century at the club's 150th celebration in 2012.

Paulsen later served as one of the Directors of Cricket Australia, representing Western Australia, and managed the Australian under-19 team in 2001.
