= Terry Alderman =

Australian cricketer

Personal information
- Full name: Terence Michael Alderman
- Born: 12 June 1956 (age 70); Subiaco, Western Australia
- Height: 187 cm (6 ft 2 in)
- Batting: Right-handed
- Bowling: Right-arm fast-medium
- Role: Bowler
- Relatives: Denise Emerson (sister); Ross Emerson (brother-in-law)

International information
- National side: Australia (1981–1991)
- Test debut (cap 310): 18 June 1981 v England
- Last Test: 27 April 1991 v West Indies
- ODI debut (cap 66): 6 June 1981 v England
- Last ODI: 15 January 1991 v New Zealand

Domestic team information
- Years: Team
- 1974/75–1992/93: Western Australia
- 1984–1986: Kent
- 1988: Gloucestershire

Career statistics
Competition	Test	ODI	FC	LA
Matches	41	65	245	166
Runs scored	203	32	1,307	163
Batting average	6.54	2.66	8.32	5.82
100s/50s	0/0	0/0	0/1	0/0
Top score	26*	9*	52*	26*
Balls bowled	10,181	3,371	48,701	8,829
Wickets	170	88	956	232
Bowling average	27.15	23.36	23.74	23.15
5 wickets in innings	14	2	53	4
10 wickets in match	1	0	8	0
Best bowling	6/47	5/17	8/46	5/17
Catches/stumpings	27/–	29/-	190/–	67/–
- Source: CricInfo, 24 July 2013

Terence Michael Alderman (born 12 June 1956) is a former Australian international cricketer who played primarily as a right-arm fast-medium bowler.

He began his first-class cricket career during the 1974–75 season with Western Australia in the Sheffield Shield and came to international prominence when he was chosen for the Australian national team to tour England in 1981. He was a poor batsman, passing fifty just once in his career and averaging barely eight in first-class cricket. He had three seasons in English county cricket, playing with Kent County Cricket Club in 1984 and 1986 and with Gloucestershire County Cricket Club in 1988.

In the 1981 Ashes series he took 42 Test wickets, including nine on debut, the biggest haul in a series since Jim Laker's 46 in 1956 and the fourth-highest total of all time. Alderman's 42 wickets is the record for the most wickets taken in a series without taking 10 wickets in a match. He was named as a Wisden Cricketer of the Year in the Almanack's 1982 edition.

Alderman took part in an unofficial Australian tour of South Africa in 1985–86 and 1986–87, when that country was banned from Test cricket as a Commonwealth anti-apartheid sanction. As a result, he received a three-year ban from international cricket which disqualified him from playing in the 1985 Ashes series in England. Following the end of his ban, Alderman returned to the Australian team and resumed his success against England, taking 41 wickets in the 1989 Ashes series and another 16 in the 1990–91 series, his final Ashes appearance. He rarely enjoyed similar success against other countries. His final Test series was against the West Indies in 1990–91, where he ended his career with 170 Test wickets.

== Early life ==
Alderman was born at Subiaco, Western Australia, the fourth of five children. His father, William, represented Western Australia in Australian Rules Football and opened the batting and bowling for Western Australia Colts without ever playing first-class cricket.

Alderman studied at Aquinas College in Perth, playing both football and cricket. He bowled in his high school team's first eleven from his third year at high school onwards and was coached by Bert Rigg during his last two years. Alderman represented Western Australia at a schoolboys' carnival in Melbourne in 1972–73 and was chosen in the Australian schoolboys team to play a governors eleven.

== Cricket career ==
In 1973–74 Alderman played for WA Colts in Melbourne and Adelaide. He took six wickets in a game in Melbourne. He made his first-class debut in 1974/75. In his first game, a Gillette Cup match, Ian Chappell took 24 runs off his second over. He was twelfth man for two Sheffield Shield games against South Australia and Victoria before being picked against New South Wales in Sydney. He took 5/63 but pulled a hamstring and had to return home. In total he took 18 first-class wickets that summer at an average of 28.

The following summer he took 17 wickets at 26 and in 1976/77 he only took 8 wickets at 17. During World Series Cricket, Alderman took 28 wickets at 21 during the 1977/78 summer. The following season he took 26 wickets at 18.69, but was overlooked for national selection.

Alderman had his best season in 1979/80 taking 42 wickets at 28.09 before going to play for Watsonians in Scotland in the northern summer of 1980. In 1980–81 he took 32 wickets at 26, a performance which earned him selection on the 1981 Ashes tour.

=== 1981 Ashes ===
Alderman had a superb Ashes series.

He was picked in the first Test and took 4/68 and 5/62, helping bowl Australia to victory. He found things harder going in the second, with 1–79 and 1–42, a game that ended in a draw. In the third Test Alderman took 3/59 in the first innings; England followed on, and Alderman helped reduce England to 7–135 with 4 wickets and two catches. Ian Botham counter-attacked and Alderman's final figures were 6/135 – Australia collapsed chasing and lost the game.

In the fourth Test Alderman bowled beautifully for figures of 5/42 and 3/65 but Australia's batsman collapsed again and lost the game. Australia lost the fifth Test, Alderman taking 4/88 and 5/109. In the sixth drawn Test Alderman took 3/84 and 2/60. He had taken 42 wickets in the Test series at 51 first-class wickets on tour at 20.86.

Alderman was picked as one of Wisden's five cricketers of the year.

=== 1981–82 ===
Alderman kept in the Australian team the following summer. In the first Test against Pakistan he took 4/36 and 2/43, helping Australia win. The going was harder in the second Test, with 2/74 and 0/37. In the third Test Alderman went for 0/62.

Alderman played in two Tests against the West Indies. He took 2/54 and 2/23 in the first match, but is probably best remembered for his batting in the first innings – he joined Kim Hughes when the score was 9/155 and stuck around for 43 more runs which proved crucial. Alderman made 10 runs in the 43-run partnership and helped Hughes reach an unbeaten 100, which won him the player of the match. He suffered in the second Test, taking 0/73 and 1/46. Alderman did not play in the third Test, which the West Indies won.

He took 37 first-class wickets that summer at 16.94.

Alderman toured New Zealand in 1982 taking 12 wickets at 30 and was picked for the 1982 tour of Pakistan. Australia went with a two-spin attack for the first two Tests and Alderman was left out. He returned for the third Test despite barely bowling during the tour, taking 2/144 in an Australian defeat. He only took four first-class wickets on tour at 65.

=== 1982–83: Injury ===
Alderman was injured in the first Test of the 1982/83 Ashes. He had taken 1/84 in the first innings when there was a pitch invasion. Alderman was hit in the back of the head by a member of the crowd, Gary Donnison. Alderman recalled, "he ran off, and I could see that there were no police in the vicinity so I attempted to apprehend him." Alderman charged at Donnison and tackled him to the ground but fell on his shoulder and injured himself. "I can't remember a lot of how I fell ... but I was immediately aware I was injured ... it was very painful indeed," Alderman said. "At the time I thought it would just pop back in – little did I know that it would be a year before I could bowl in a competitive match again," he said. "I had to learn to swim a mile a day for eight months. What is tough in sport, is that if you have a physical injury or problem, no one wants to know you. In a way, when I came back, it was like starting another career."

He took 18 first-class wickets that summer at 19.61.

Alderman was unable to force his way back into the Australian team over the 1983/84 summer. However 30 first-class wickets at 25.26 saw him picked for the West Indies.

=== Return to Test cricket ===
Alderman was selected for the tour of the West Indies in 1984. He took 1/64 and 0/43 in the first Test. In the second Test he took 2/91 but had some success with the bat, scoring 21 in Australia's second innings and taking part in a 61-run partnership with Allan Border. In the third Test Alderman took 1/152 and 0/18. He was dropped for the final two Tests. Alderman took 15 first-class wickets on tour at 43.6. After the tour he played his first season of county cricket in England with Kent County Cricket Club.

Alderman made his way back into the Australian team for the first Test against the West Indies during 1984/85. He took 6/128 but the West Indies won by an innings. He took 3/107 in the second Test, which ended with Kim Hughes' resignation as Australian captain. After going wicketless in the third Test he was dropped for the final two Tests of the series.

Alderman took 44 wickets at 28.34 that summer. He was picked to tour England in 1985 but lost his spot when it was revealed he had signed to play in South Africa. Alderman says he was motivated by financial conditions after being left off the contract list of Australian players in 1984. "The board was; not thinking of me for the future.! I was 28 and I had a family to think of, The opportunity to go to South Africa and to get a nest egg came up. It pointed out to me the lack of security you have when you play this, game. 'It's so fickle: one minute you are up,'the next you are down."

=== Playing in South Africa, 1985/86–1986/87 ===
In South Africa Alderman took 23 wickets at 21.21 in 1985/86. He played for Kent again in 1986 and took 98 wickets at 19.20. In 1986/87 he took 18 wickets at 32.77. Alderman later admitted his trips to South Africa had been disappointing bowling-wise and he set himself the goal of getting back in the Australian team by the 1989 Ashes.

=== Return to Australia ===
Alderman returned to domestic cricket in Australia in 1987/88, taking 39 wickets at 24.20. He played for Gloucestershire County Cricket Club in England in 1988, taking 75 wickets at 22.81.

Alderman was available for international selection from the 1988/89 season onwards. He was overlooked for the first two Tests but back for the third, taking 4/68 and 3/78. Alderman took 48 first-class wickets in 1988/89 at 20.93 and was selected for the 1989 Ashes in England.

=== 1989 Ashes ===
Alderman toured for Australia in 1989. In the first Test he took 5/107 and 5/44, helping Australia to a big win. In the second he took 3/60 and 6/128. In the third he went for 3/61; the fourth, 0/49 and 5/66; the fifth 5/69 and 2/32; the sixth 5–66 and 2–30.

He took 70 first-class wickets on tour at 15.64.

=== Final Test years ===
In Australia, Alderman took 3/73 and 1/59 against New Zealand in November 1989 and 3/81 against Sri Lanka in the first Test in December. He took 2/71 and 0/38 in the second Test. Against Pakistan in January 1990 he took 3/30 and 5/105 in the first Test. He took 34 first-class wickets over the 1989/90 summer at 23.05.

He toured New Zealand in 1990 taking 4/46 and 0/27 in the only Test played on the tour. Alderman kept his place in the Australian team to play England in the 1990/91 Ashes. He took 2/44 and 6/47 in the first Test; 2/86 and 0/19 in the second; 3/62 and 0/29 in the third; he did not play in the fourth but took 0/66 and 3/75 in the fifth. He took 31 first-class wickets at 28.38 that summer and was picked to tour the West Indies.

Alderman's final Test was on the tour of the West Indies in 1991 when he took nine wickets at 38.44 on the tour, playing in just one of the Test matches, taking one wicket in the match.

=== Final years of cricket ===
In 1991/92 Alderman took 29 wickets at 31.82 but was overlooked for national selection. His last first-class season was in 1992/93. He took 20 wickets at 36.35.

== Awards ==
In 2000, Alderman was awarded the Australian Sports Medal for being the all-time leading wicket taker for Western Australia.

== Family and personal life ==
Alderman's sister Denise Emerson is married to former Test umpire Ross Emerson and herself played seven Tests for the Australian women's cricket team.

Alderman is an alumnus of Aquinas College, Perth.
