= Wendy Napier =

Australian cricketer (born 1957)

Personal information
- Full name: Wendy Napier
- Born: 1 October 1957 (age 69); Caulfield, Victoria Australia
- Batting: Right-handed
- Role: Batter

International information
- National side: Australia (1985)
- Test debut (cap 107): 1 January 1985 v England
- Last Test: 12 January 1985 v England
- ODI debut (cap 42): 3 February 1985 v England
- Last ODI: 10 February 1985 v England

Domestic team information
- Years: Team
- 1979/80–1986/87: Victoria

Career statistics
Competition	WTest	WODI	WFC	WLA
Matches	2	4	19	16
Runs scored	21	11	400	315
Batting average	7.00	5.50	18.18	24.23
100s/50s	0/0	0/0	0/2	0/2
Top score	9	9	59	79*
Catches/stumpings	0/–	2/–	3/–	3/–
- Source: CricketArchive, 12 January 2023

Wendy Napier (born 1 October 1957) is an Australian former cricketer who played as a right-handed batter. She appeared in two Test matches and four One Day Internationals for Australia in 1985, all against England. She played domestic cricket for Victoria.

When she was first selected for Australia, Napier was the captain of the Melbourne University Cricket Club women's team.
