= John Charles Horsey James =

Australian judge

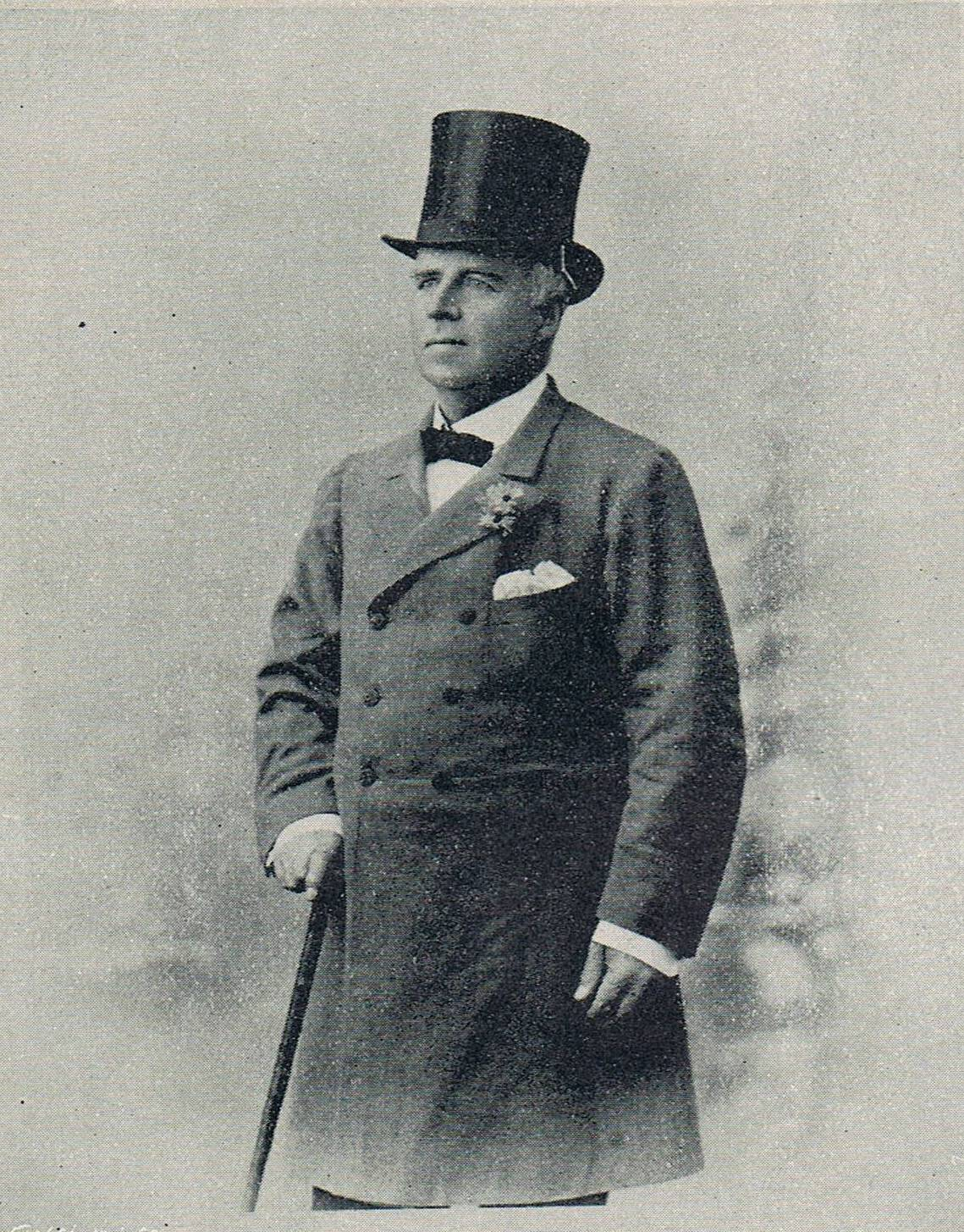
J. C. H. James

John Charles Horsey James (30 January 1841 – 3 February 1899) was a magistrate in Western Australia and the inaugural president of the Western Australian Cricket Association from 1885.

He was the son of Rev. John H. James of Highfield, rector of Avington, Berkshire and his second wife Theodosia Mary Tennant, of 'Romansleigh' in North Devon. He was educated at Rugby School between 1854 and 1860, and later at Oxford University, where he was awarded his law degree in 1864. At Rugby he sat under Dr Frederick Temple, the Archbishop of Canterbury and at Oxford played cricket in the first eleven of Exeter College.

Choosing law as his profession, he enrolled at the Inner Temple and in November 1866 was called to the bar, where he practised on the Oxford circuit. In 1875, the Secretary of State for the Colonies, Earl Carnarvon offered James the position of Commissioner of Titles for Western Australia, with the task of implementing the Torrens title transfer of lands system at that colony. He accepted the offer, becoming one of the last imperial appointments to colonial administrative positions made direct from the home government.

== Western Australia ==
James arrived in Western Australia in July 1875 with the task of expanding and improving the Titles Office. He held the position until his death in 1899.

At times, James acted as Registrar of the Supreme Court of Western Australia, Registrar in bankruptcy, and Stipendiary Magistrate of Perth. He was gazetted as a justice of the peace for the colony in 1886 and Police Magistrate in June 1897. In June 1887 he was appointed as the fourth nominee member of the Western Australian Legislative Council during the absence of Sir John Forrest in London. He sat for two sessions and retired in February 1888. He also held positions of Resident Magistrate, Guildford from September 1887 for a time and again between about 1897 and 1898. He was acting Puisne Judge between February 1898 and January 1899.

Together with George Parker (brother of Stephen Henry Parker) and Josceline Amherst, James established the Western Australian Cricket Association in 1884, obtaining a 15-acre (61,000 m^{2}) grant the following year on the foreshore at East Perth and the 'Association Ground'. He held the presidency of the Association from 1884 to 1899. James played with the Metropolitans/Perth Cricket Club.

He married Rebecca Catherine Clifton, eldest daughter of Charles Hippuff Clifton at St George's Church in Perth on 16 September 1885. They had seven children, the youngest being actor and soldier M. E. Clifton James.

As well as having an avid interest in cricket, James was involved in a number of other sports and sporting associations including being a steward of the Western Australian Turf Club from 1887 to 1897. He was also president of the Swan River Mechanics' Institute from 1887 and was involved in the arts with an interest in amateur Shakespearean theatre as well as in music, painting and sculpture. Socially, he was a leading figure in the community.

After his father's death in 1886, he inherited the family Gloucester and Devon estates. James built a grand English style residence in Goderich Street, Perth called Romansleigh, named after the Devon property. He was a member of the Carlton Club in London and Hurlingham Yacht Club and Royal Yacht Squadron of England.

John James died in Perth on 3 February 1899 after a short illness and was buried at East Perth Cemeteries.
