= Aberfeldie Park =

Cricket ground in Melbourne, Australia

Coordinates: 37°45′45″S 144°54′1″E

Ground information
- Location: Essendon, Melbourne, Australia

International information
- First WODI: 2 February 1985: Australia v England
- Last WODI: 10 February 1985: Australia v New Zealand
- As of 8 September 2020; Source: Ground profile

Aberfeldie Park is a cricket ground in Essendon, a suburb of Melbourne, Australia. It is the home of the Aberfeldie Park Cricket Club, and hosted several Rose Bowl series Women's One Day International cricket matches during the winter of 1984–85.

Aberfeldie Park has won the VTCA ground of the year in the 2001/2 season as well as being awarded curator of the year in the 2014/15 season. Aberfeldie Park Cricket Club also produced Paul Hibbert who played one test for Australia in the 1977–78 season.
