= WACA Ground =

Cricket venue in Perth, Western Australia

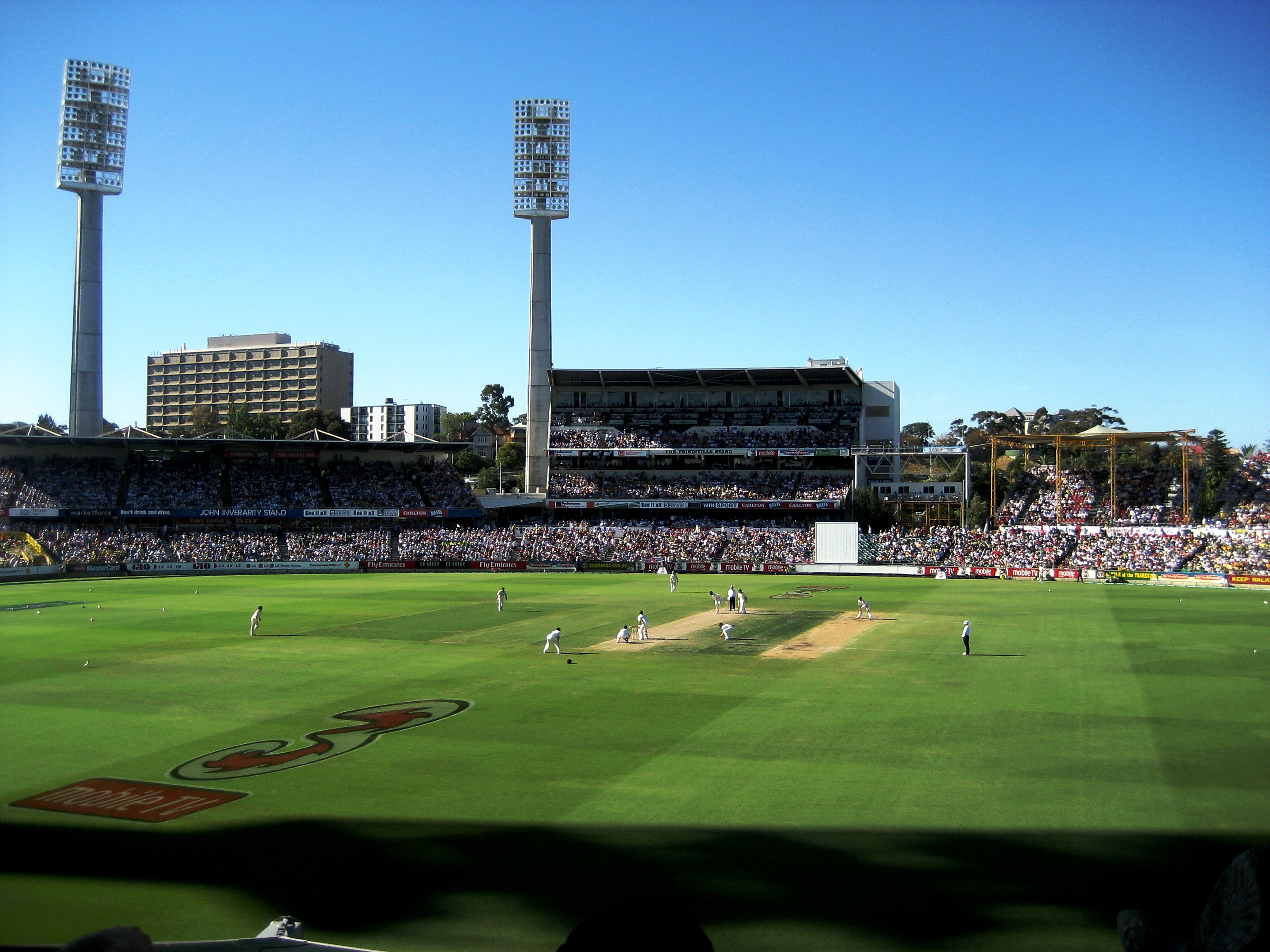
- During the 3rd Test of the 2006/07 Ashes
- Interactive map of WACA Ground
- Location: East Perth, Western Australia
- Coordinates: 31°57′35″S 115°52′46″E
- Owner: Western Australian Cricket Association
- Operator: Western Australian Cricket Association
- Capacity: 10,000
- Surface: Grass
- Record attendance: 34,317 – 1994 AFL finals

Construction
- Opened: 1890; 136 years ago

Website
- https://wacaground.com.au/

Ground information
- End names
- Gloucester Park End (formerly Prindiville Stand End) Members' (or Lillee-Marsh Stand) End

International information
- First men's Test: 11–16 December 1970: Australia v England
- Last men's Test: 14–18 December 2017: Australia v England
- First men's ODI: 9 December 1980: India v New Zealand
- Last men's ODI: 19 January 2017: Australia v Pakistan
- First men's T20I: 11 December 2007: Australia v New Zealand
- Last men's T20I: 31 October 2010: Australia v Sri Lanka
- First women's Test: 21–24 March 1958: Australia v England
- Last women's Test: 6–10 March 2026: Australia v India
- First women's ODI: 12 March 2005: Australia v New Zealand
- Last women's ODI: 22 February 2019: Australia v New Zealand
- First women's T20I: 22 February 2020: Thailand v West Indies
- Last women's T20I: 24 February 2020: India v Bangladesh

Team information
Western Australia (Cricket)	(1899–)
Perth Football Club (WAFL)	(1899–1958)
West Coast Eagles (AFL)	(1987–2000)
Fremantle Football Club (AFL)	(1995–2000)
Perth Scorchers (BBL)	(2011–2018)
Perth Scorchers Women (WBBL)	(2015–)
WA Reds (ARL/SL)	(1995–1997)
East Fremantle Football Club (WAFL)	(2022–2023)
- As of 17 February 2024; Source: ESPN Cricinfo

The WACA Ground (/ˈwækə/) is a sports stadium in Perth, Western Australia. The stadium's name derives from the initials of its owners and operators, the Western Australian Cricket Association (WACA).

The WACA has been referred to as Western Australia's "home of cricket" since the early 1890s, with Test cricket played at the ground since the 1970–71 season. The ground is the home venue of Western Australia's first-class cricket team, the Western Warriors, and the state's Women's National Cricket League side, the Western Fury. The Perth Scorchers, a Big Bash League franchise, played home matches at the ground until 2019. The Scorchers and Australian national team have shifted most matches to the nearby 60,000-seat Perth Stadium.

The pitch at the WACA is regarded as one of the quickest and bounciest in the world. These characteristics, in combination with the afternoon sea-breezes which regularly pass the ground (the Fremantle Doctor), have historically made the ground an attractive place for pace and swing bowlers. The outfield is exceptionally fast, contributing to the ground seeing some very fast scoring; as of 2026, four of the ten fastest Test centuries have been scored at the WACA.

Throughout its history, the ground has also been used for a range of other sports, including athletics carnivals, Australian rules football, baseball, soccer, rugby league, rugby union, and international rules football; however, recent years have seen most of these activities relocated to other venues. It has also been used for major rock concerts. The WACA Museum is located on-site and features exhibits about Western Australian cricket.

== Early history ==
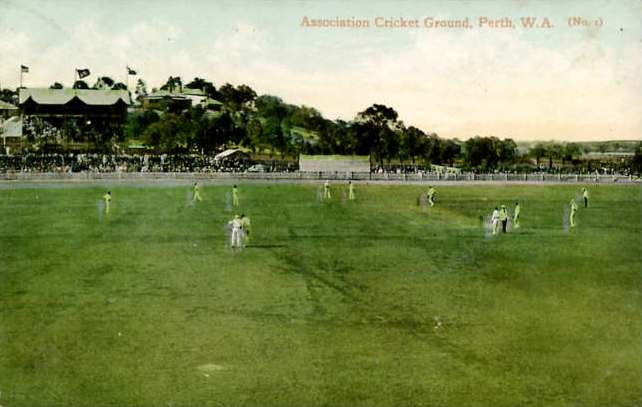
An early coloured image of the Association ground in about 1910, looking north, with a large crowd watching a game in progress. Note the original 1890s stand is evidently packed.

William Henry Wise, a gardener who came to WA from England in 1880, laid the first turf wicket at the WACA. Wise was personal gardener to Sir George Shenton, of Crawley. In addition to his work at the WACA Ground, he laid the first tennis court on the Perth Esplanade.

The Western Australian Cricket Association was officially established on 25 November 1885 under the Presidency of JCH James. In 1893, the WACA ground was officially opened, occupying a site of old swamp land to the east of the city. The association has a 999-year lease over the land (which expires in 2888). The long term of the lease means that, effectively, the association has freehold title (save that it cannot divest itself of any part of the land without the state government's consent). Originally, the title covered 29 acres (117,000 m^{2}), and took in what is now Gloucester Park. However, the latter part of the land was divested to the Trotting Association in the early 1920s. Between 1977 and 1979, (then-rebel) World Series Cricket matches were played at Gloucester Park because the Kerry Packer-led organisation was not granted access to the WACA.

The first match played on the turf wickets took place in February 1894. However, difficulties encountered in transporting teams to Western Australia meant that the ground was not part of Australia's main cricket community for many years. Even with the building of a transcontinental railway, the trip from the eastern states still took several days. It took the introduction of scheduled flights to Western Australia to make the WACA readily accessible to interstate or overseas teams.

James Gardiner, president of the WACA for three terms between 1897 and 1924, proposed the adoption of 'electorate' cricket (as it was first known) whereby teams were established on a district basis for competition. He also inaugurated Country Week cricket, during which country teams compete against each other. In 1907, the WACA ground was under threat of being controlled by the Perth City Council to recover debts. Gardiner led the bid to save the ground and secured a government loan. Further financial difficulties led Gardiner to again raise funds and donations with a cricket match by the Australian XI team in 1912.

From 1928 to 1935, motorcycle speedway took place around the outside of the oval. The Australian champion in 1928 and 1929 Sig Schlam, lost his life in a crash at the ground on 1 November 1930.

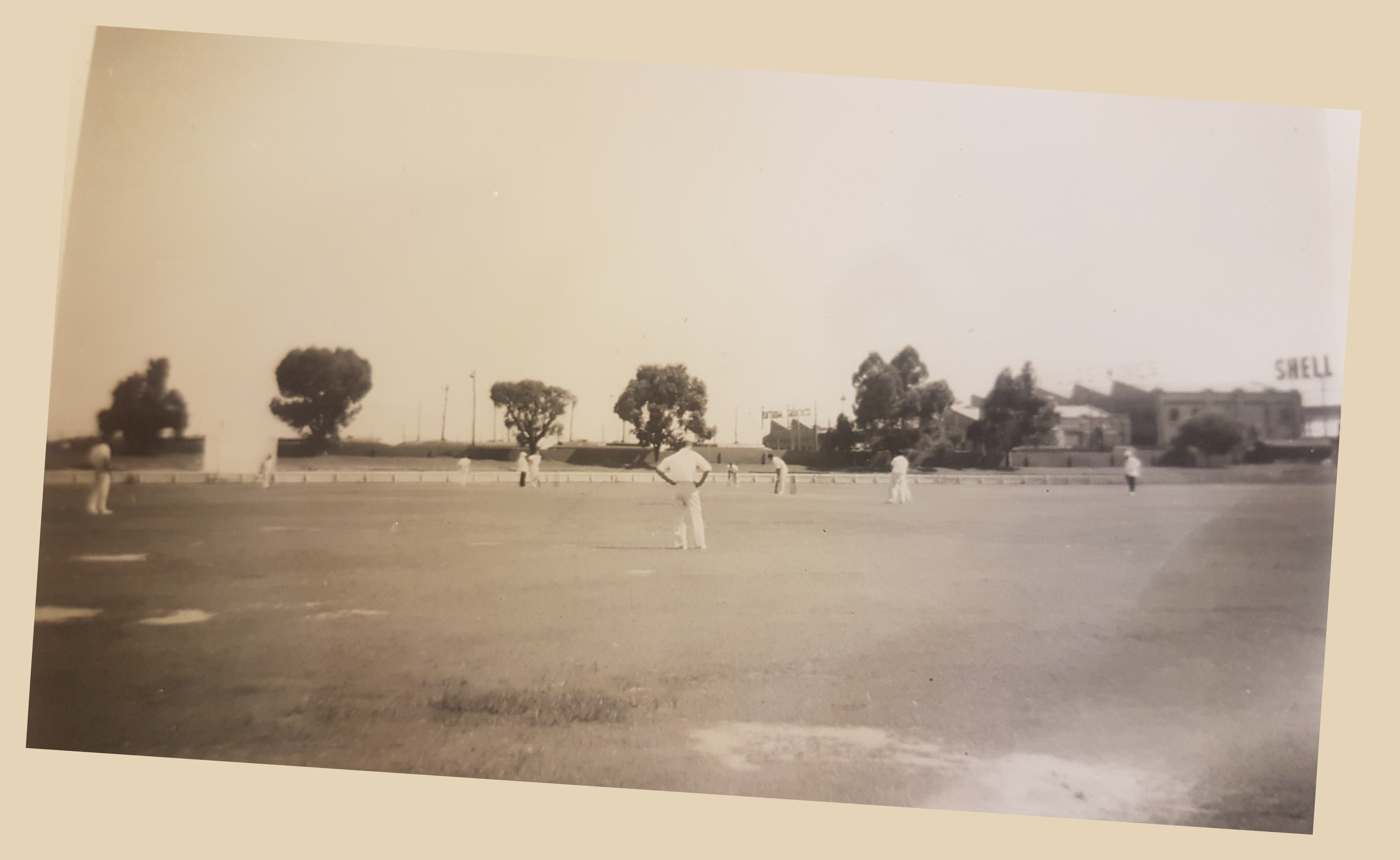
Photo taken during a domestic match at the WACA Ground in 1951.

== Ground developments ==
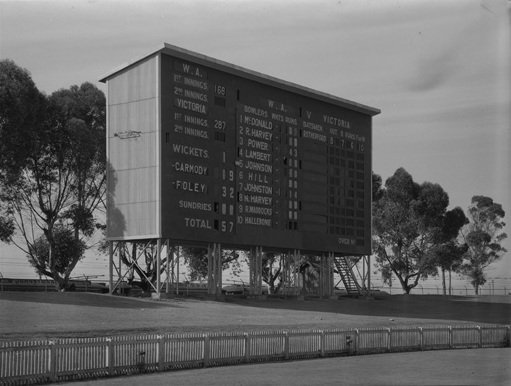
The WACA scoreboard at its opening in December 1953

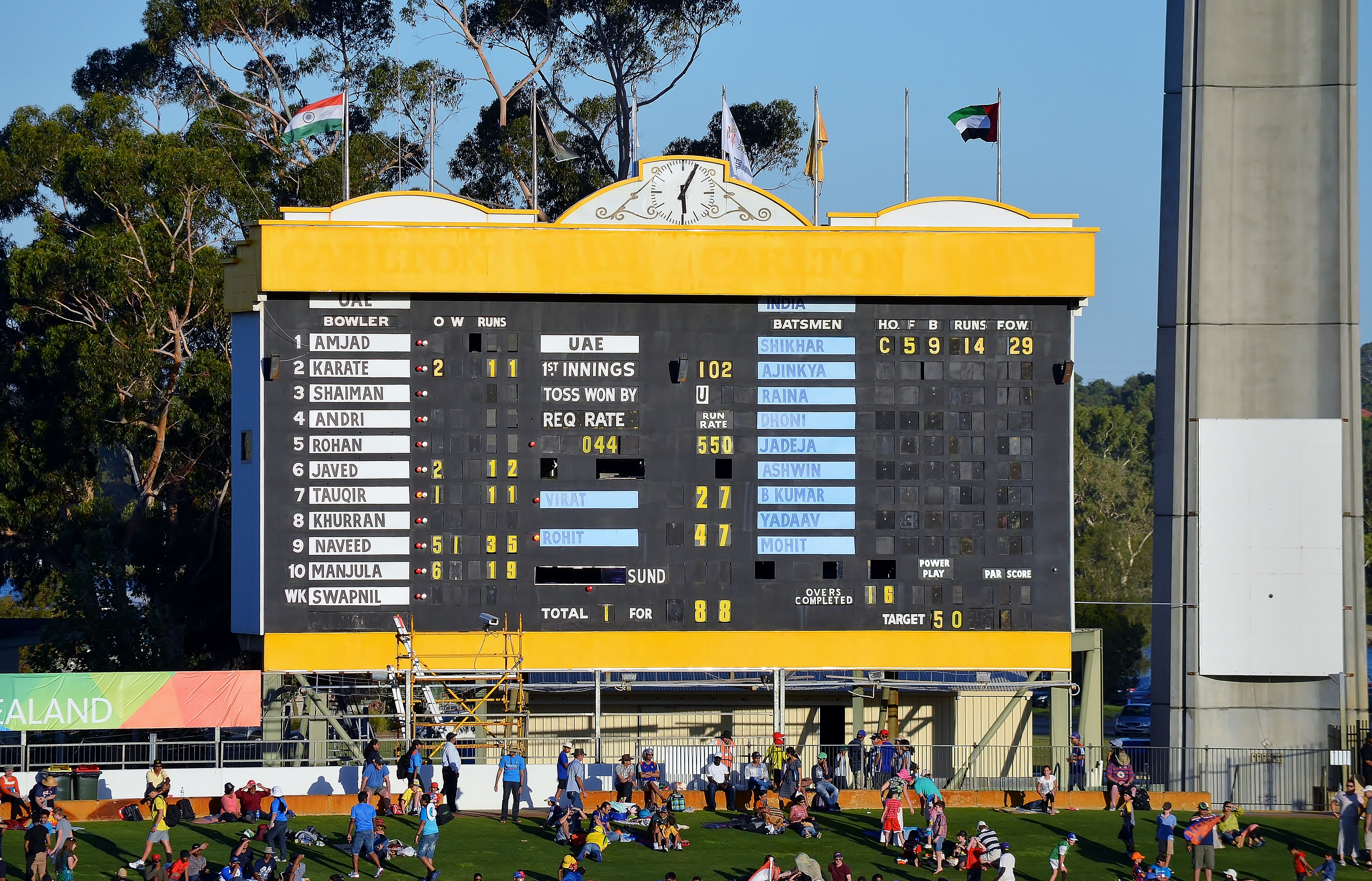
The WACA Scoreboard in 2015

The WACA ground, like many stadiums of its era, has undergone various re-developments. The most notable are:

- The building, in 1895, of the first grandstand; seating 500 people and incorporating dressing rooms, a dining room, bathrooms, members' rooms and bars.
- In 1931 the Farley Stand was opened, named after W.J. Farley, the association's president from 1915–1916 to 1916–17 and secretary from 1917–1918 to 1928–1929.
- In 1948 the scoreboard at the WACA was destroyed by a storm. In 1954 a replacement scoreboard was built, a donation from the North West Murchison Cricket Association; this, now iconic, scoreboard remains in operation.
- In the 1960s the Players Pavilion was built to provide facilities for the players and the WACA administration. Additional seating was later added, initially to accommodate the first Test match to be played at the WACA (Australia v England in 1970).
- Also to welcome Test cricket to the WACA, 1970 saw the opening of the "Test Stand". It was later renamed the Inverarity Stand, after Western Australian, South Australian and Australian player John Inverarity.
- From 1984 to 1988 the WACA underwent major renovations, including a realignment and a complete resurfacing of the ground and the construction of new terracing and seating in the outer.

Also built were: –

- the three-tiered Prindiville Stand, named after the then WACA president Bernie Prindiville in 1985
- the two-tiered Lillee-Marsh Stand named after the former WA Australian cricketers Dennis Lillee and Rod Marsh in 1988, which increased the ground's seating capacity.

Six large light towers were also installed in 1986 at a cost of $4.2 million, allowing for night-time sports such as day-night cricket matches to be played at the ground. An icon of the WACA, the floodlights are 70 metres high and cost $600 per hour to run.

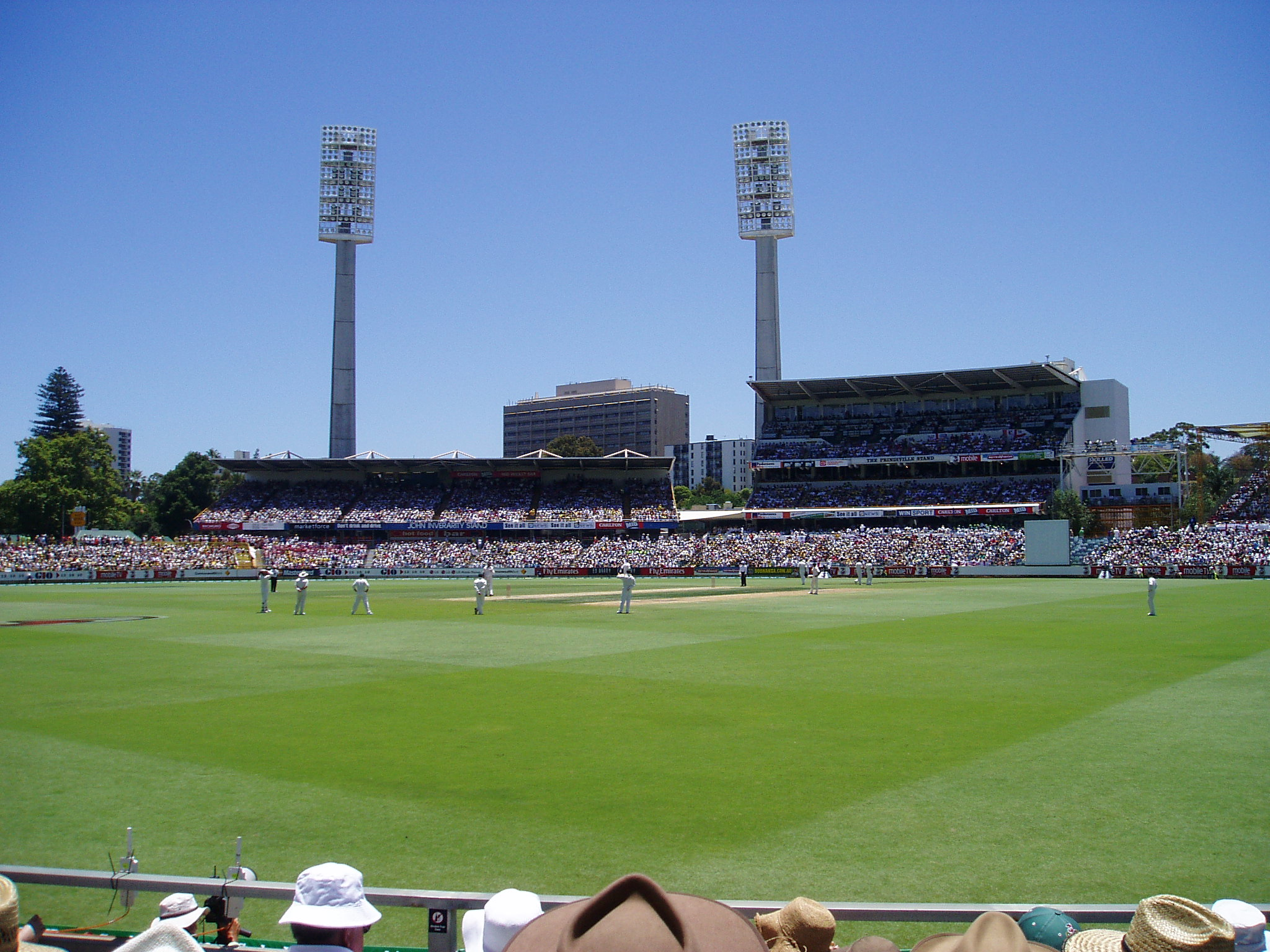
The WACA facing north, showing the Inverarity Stand (left) and the Prindiville Stand (right)

These redevelopments also made the venue an attractive venue for sports other than cricket, and it was during the late 1980s and early 1990s that the ground saw its greatest use as a multi-sports venue. From 1987 to 2000, the ground was used by the West Coast Eagles, and from 1995 by the Fremantle Dockers, both Western Australian-based AFL teams. 72 AFL matches were held at the ground during this time. From 1995 to 1997 the WACA also served as the home ground for the Western Reds rugby league team. In the late 1990s the ground played host to the Perth Heat in the former Australian Baseball League (1989-1999).

However, for various reasons, these sports moved away from the WACA (in the case of night football, to Subiaco Oval), and as a consequence, the WACA was again redeveloped in 2002. The capacity of the ground was reduced to around 20,000 with the demolition of the Farley Stand and the old Players Pavilion with the stands being replaced by podiums for temporary stands, replacing the seats square of the wickets with grass hills, the construction of a new Players Pavilion in between the Lillee-Marsh Stand and the Scoreboard, replacement of seats in the remaining grandstands and the dimensions of the playing arena were also decreased by a total of 31 metres at the eastern and western boundaries, meaning Australian rules football could no longer be played at the ground. From time to time, temporary stands are used to boost the ground's capacity to 24,500.

In 2013, a new video screen was installed at the WACA near the old scoreboard, replacing one of the old temporary screens.

=== Rejected proposals ===
In April 2007 the Western Australian Cricket Association announced a $250m redevelopment of the stadium. Seating capacity was to be increased, with residential and commercial buildings built in the surrounding areas. The project was to be done in partnership with Ascot Capital Limited with a three- to four-year time frame. WACA members gave final approval for the project in July 2010 and construction was expected to commence in March 2011. However, by November 2011 work on the redevelopment had still yet to commence, and it was reported that delays could continue for years. Although the project received finance, tax office and members' approval, adverse market conditions were believed to have made the project unfeasible. The redevelopment was also the subject of a dispute between the WACA and the Australian Cricketers Association, with the players' union seeking 26 per cent of the value of the project.

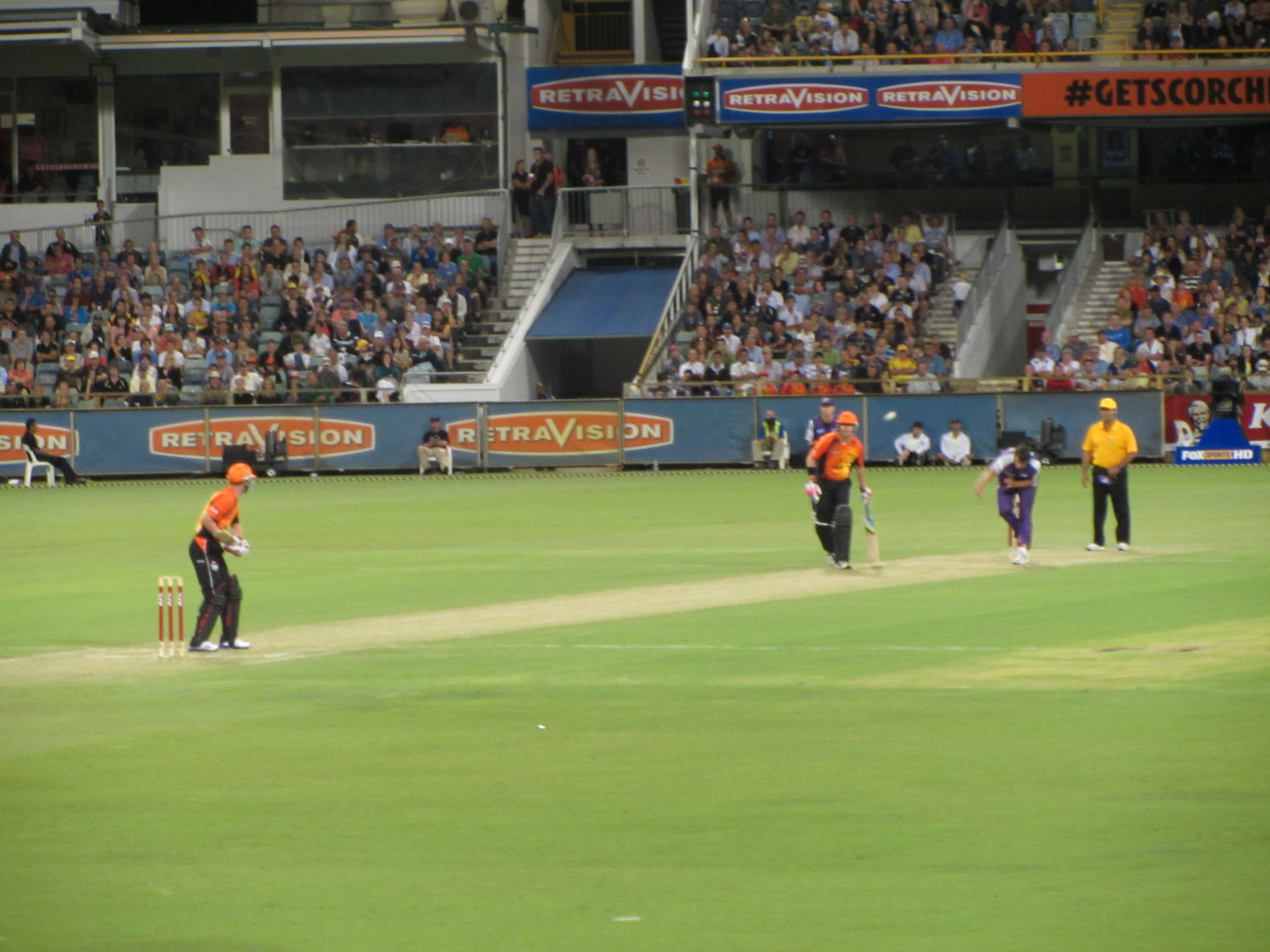
Perth Scorchers taking on Hobart Hurricanes at The WACA Ground in 2011 – the first BBL match played at the ground.

In November 2012 the WACA and Ascot Capital Limited commenced selling 137 apartments in "The Gardens", a planned 10-story residential complex to be located on the western boundary line of the ground. Construction of The Gardens was expected to commence mid-2013 and be completed by mid-2015. The agreement between the WACA and Ascot Capital would have seen new northern grandstands, an increase in ground capacity and a long term revenue stream. However, in December 2013 the WACA released a statement that it had abandoned the so-called Gardens Development because it was unable to achieve the pre-sales target in order to finance the project.

In September 2013 Cricket Australia announced that the WACA ground would not host a Test match in the shortened 2014/15 season to accommodate the 2015 Cricket World Cup, a decision which left Perth without a summer test match for the first time in nearly 40 years. Cricket Australia said the WACA Ground required significant improvements, given it has the smallest capacity of the five mainland capital city venues.

=== 2019–2025 redevelopments ===
By the 2018/19 summer, the WACA Ground was no longer the primary international cricket venue in Perth, having been replaced by Perth Stadium in Burswood for most limited overs internationals, Test matches and domestic Big Bash League matches for the Perth Scorchers. Several years before construction of Perth Stadium concluded, the WACA proposed developing the ground into a 15,000-capacity boutique stadium with improved facilities. In March 2019 the WACA unveiled plans to improve cricket training facilities and enable the ground to host large-scale community events. The plans also included a proposal to reshape the ground to once again be capable of hosting Australian rules football matches, notably marquee West Australian Football League matches. The total cost would be $75 million, of which $60 million would need to be either privately financed or granted by state and federal governments.

In August 2019, the Government of Western Australia provided a $100,000 grant to the Western Australian Cricket Association to construct two new change rooms under the Lillee-Marsh Stand to support women's cricket in the state. Construction of the change rooms was completed in time for the 2020 ICC Women's T20 World Cup. In December 2019 the WACA confirmed a $30 million grant had been granted from the Federal Government for major upgrade works. This was later matched with an identical grant from the Government of Western Australia.

Redevelopment works began in August 2021. The Inverarity and Prindiville stands were demolished to be replaced by a community sports hub and a new multi-level public pavilion, and the grass hills at either end have been partially excavated to allow Australian rules football matches to again be played at the ground. New facilities include a high-performance cricket centre, a new museum, cafe, gym, and a six-lane, 50-metre outdoor swimming pool. A new aquatic centre will include an indoor learn-to-swim pool and waterslides. As part of the redevelopment, five of the light towers were also upgraded with the replacement of the older lights with LED sports lighting as well as the ability to be lit up in various colours in a similar way to Perth Stadium's exterior and were first switched on in December 2022. Light tower no.2, located next the site of the original Players Pavilion was not upgraded and was demolished to make way for the high-performance centre.

In November 2023, a contract was awarded to ADCO Constructions with an expected 2025 completion date. Since the redevelopments the ground's capacity has been reduced to 10,000 patrons.

The East Fremantle Football Club played their home matches at the WACA during the 2022, 2023 and 2024 seasons while East Fremantle Oval was redeveloped.

== Notable events at the WACA ==
1899

- The first first-class match was played on the ground between Western Australia and South Australia between 3 and 6 April 1899. South Australia was victorious, winning by 4 wickets.

1930s

- In 1932, Donald Bradman played at the ground for the first time and attracted a crowd in excess of 20,000 in 1932.
- On 24 and 26 November 1934, the world's first international women's cricket match was played at the WACA Ground between Western Australia and a touring England team. The visitors batted first and declared at 3/201, with Molly Hide scoring an even 100. Western Australia was then dismissed for 82, and, after following on, was 3/59 when stumps were drawn early to enable the visitors to be driven to Fremantle and embark on the SS Balranald for Adelaide.

1950s

- In March 1958, the first women's cricket Test match to be held in Perth was played at the WACA Ground, and ended in a draw (Scorecard). The match was also the WACA Ground's first Test match.

1960s

- In October 1967, Western Australia's Ian Brayshaw collected 10 for 44 against Victoria in Victoria's first innings (Scorecard), the second best bowling figures in an innings in Sheffield Shield history.

1970s

- During the first men's Test match at the WACA, Australia's Greg Chappell scored 108 on Test debut versus England, batting at 7, on 13 December 1970. Brian Luckhurst, Ian Redpath and John Edrich also scored centuries in the draw (Scorecard).
- On 24 February 1973, The Rolling Stones performed at the WACA during their 1973 Pacific Tour.
- Doug Walters hit a century in a session against England in 1974, where he hit Bob Willis for six from the last ball of the day (Scorecard).
- In December 1975 West Indian Roy Fredericks scored a century in just 71 balls against Australia, which was at the time the second fastest century (in terms of balls faced) in Test history. Fredericks went on to score 169, which is the record for the highest score at the WACA by an overseas player (Scorecard).
- In the semi-final of the 1976/77 Gillette Cup domestic one day competition, which became known as the "Miracle Match", Western Australia was bowled out by Queensland for 77, before dismissing Queensland for 62 to win the match.(Scorecard).
- Australian batsman Tony Mann scored 108 against India as nightwatchman in 1977/1978. This is one of only five centuries by a nightwatchman in Test match cricket (Scorecard).
- In 1977–1978, the Domestic One-Day Final was played at the WACA for the first time, with Western Australia defeating Tasmania.
- On the last day of a Test match in March 1979, Pakistani tailender Sikander Bakht was Mankaded by Australia's Alan Hurst to end Pakistan's innings. Later in the day, Australian Andrew Hilditch was dismissed handled the ball after he interrupted a throw from mid-on and passed the ball to the bowler Sarfraz Nawaz, who appealed. Both dismissals were considered to have been against the spirit of cricket, and Nawaz' appeal was considered to have been retribution for Bakht's Mankading. (Scorecard).
- England's only men's Test win at the ground came during the World Series Cricket split in 1978/1979, when David Gower scored 102. Rodney Hogg took ten wickets for Australia (Scorecard).
- In December 1979, on the second day of the Test match between Australia and England, Dennis Lillee came out to bat with a cricket bat made from aluminium, known as a ComBat, rather than the traditional willow. After four deliveries and three runs, England captain Mike Brearley complained it was damaging the ball. Play was held up for ten minutes as the umpires persuaded Lillee to change to a wooden bat (Video). In the same match, Ian Botham took 11 for 176 (6 for 78 and 5 for 98), which were his best figures against Australia (Scorecard).

1980s

- On 9 December 1980, a one-day international match was played at the ground for the first time, between India and New Zealand, which India won by 5 runs (Scorecard).
- In a 1981 incident described by Wisden Cricketers' Almanack as "one of the most undignified incidents in Test history", Dennis Lillee and Pakistani batsman Javed Miandad clashed after the two collided with each other on the pitch. After colliding, Lillee turned and kicked Miandad from behind; Miandad lifted his bat above his head as if to strike Lillee and Lillee backed off. The umpire Tony Crafter stepped in to separate the two. Lillee was fined and suspended for two matches – (Video, Scorecard).
- Terry Alderman suffered a serious shoulder injury in 1982/1983 while tackling an English ground invader in the Test match against England. Greg Chappell led his team off the ground for 14 minutes and 26 arrests were made (Video, Scorecard).
- On 5 February 1984 the record one-day cricket match crowd at WACA Ground of 27,057 was recorded, for the game contested by Australia and the West Indies.(Scorecard).
- In December 1984, the WACA hosted its second women's Test match, between Australia and England. Local Test debutante Denise Emerson (sister of Terry Alderman) top scored for Australia with 84 in the team's first innings, but Jan Brittin achieved the overall top score with 112 in England's second innings (Scorecard). The match was drawn.
- In 1986 Western Australia played Victoria in a McDonald's Cup fixture as the ground's first cricket match under lights.
- The Benson & Hedges Perth Challenge, a one-off One Day International tournament, was held in late December 1986 and early January 1987 to help celebrate Australia's defence of the America's Cup yachting competition. Australia, England, Pakistan and the West Indies were the competitors, with England winning the tournament (Scorecards).
- Merv Hughes took a hat-trick in the Test against the West Indies in 1988/1989, and went on to take 8–87 in the innings. He ended up with 13–217 for the match, the most wickets taken at the ground in a Test match. In the same Test, Australian tail-end batsman Geoff Lawson had his jaw broken by a Curtly Ambrose bouncer (Scorecard).
- New Zealander Mark Greatbatch scored 146 not out off 485 balls against Australia in November 1989. The match was drawn. Greatbatch was at the crease for almost 11 hours over two days, and saved New Zealand from defeat (Scorecard).
- Geoff Marsh scored 355* for Western Australia v South Australia in December 1989 (Scorecard). This is the highest ever individual score at the ground by a Western Australian and the seventh highest score in Sheffield Shield history. During this innings, Marsh shared a 1st wicket partnership of 431 with Mike Veletta, the highest ever first wicket partnership in interstate cricket.

1990s

- Steve Waugh and Mark Waugh put on a partnership of 464* for New South Wales against Western Australia in 1990,(Scorecard), which is the highest partnership in Sheffield Shield history.
- On 30 January 1993, Curtly Ambrose had a stunning spell of 7–1 (eventually 7/25) as Australia crashed from 3–85 to 119 all out (Scorecard).
- The largest cricket crowd at the WACA, 28,210, was recorded on 16 January 1994 when Australia played South Africa in a One Day International match. (Scorecard).
- The largest crowd at the WACA of 34,317 attended the AFL Preliminary Final between the West Coast Eagles and the Melbourne Football Club, 24 September 1994.
- In 1995, watched by a record 24,392, the Western Reds Rugby League team made its debut in ARL competition, defeating St George 28–16.
- On 24 June 1995, First ever international friendly soccer played at the WACA of 11,634. Socceroos vs Ghana and lost 0–1.
- The Western Warriors defeated the Queensland Bulls in the final of the 1999/2000 Australian one-day domestic competition. WA batted first and made 301. Queensland was in a comfortable position at 1/202 in the 30th over, only to collapse to be all out for 256 in the 46th over.

2000s

- On 1 December 2000, Australia's Glenn McGrath took a Test hat-trick, dismissing the West Indian batsmen Sherwin Campbell, Brian Lara, and captain Jimmy Adams, taking his 300th Test wicket in the process (Lara). This also lead the way to Australia's first ever win against the West Indies at the WACA after 5 losses (including 3 by an innings) from previous encounters stretching back as far as 1975.(Scorecard)
- In February 2001, Australia's Damien Martyn scored 144* against Zimbabwe in a one-day international, the highest ODI score for an individual at the ground. Australia won the game by one run.(Scorecard)
- Australia's Matthew Hayden scored a then Test-record 380 against Zimbabwe in 2003, surpassing Brian Lara's world record highest score of 375. Australia declared at 735–6, the highest ever team total compiled at the ground in Tests (Scorecard).
- In 2004, at the age of 34, Glenn McGrath took eight wickets for 24 runs against Pakistan, his best Test bowling figures, and the best ever Test bowling figures at the WACA (Scorecard).
- On 8 May 2004, Kiss kicked off their Rock the Nation Tour at the WACA.
- On 12 January 2005, the WACA hosted Australia's first Twenty20 match, played between the Western Warriors and the Victorian Bushrangers. It drew a sellout crowd of 20,700 – the largest seen at the ground for many years.
- Chris Rogers and Marcus North put on a partnership of 459, Western Australia v Victoria, in October 2006 (Scorecard). This is the third highest partnership and highest partnership for the third wicket in Sheffield Shield history. Rogers' score of 279 was at the time the second highest ever by a West Australian, behind the 355* that Geoff Marsh scored at the same ground in December 1989.
- Australian wicket keeper Adam Gilchrist hit the second fastest hundred in Test match history (now the fourth fastest), off 57 balls, in the 3rd Ashes Test match, in December 2006.(Scorecard)This was just one more ball than the record set by Viv Richards in 1985–1986. It eclipsed the previous Australian record of a hundred off 67 balls set by Jack Gregory at Johannesburg in 1921–1922. Gilchrist did not score a run from seven of his first nine deliveries.
- The WACA hosted its first Twenty20 International match on 11 December 2007. Australia defeated New Zealand by 55 runs (Scorecard).
- India defeated Australia by 72 runs to end Australia's record-equaling Test match winning streak of 16 consecutive wins, in January 2008 (Scorecard).
- South Africa defeated Australia by six wickets in a Test match in December 2008, achieving the second-highest successful run chase in Test history when they reached the victory target of 414 late in the second session on the final day, for the loss of just four wickets. In the match, Australian fast bowler Mitchell Johnson became the first left-arm paceman to take eight wickets in a Test innings with figures of 8/61 in South Africa's first innings (Scorecard).
- In December 2009, West Indian Chris Gayle scored the fifth-fastest hundred in Test cricket history, against Australia (now the eighth fastest). His hundred came off just 70 balls and included six sixes and nine fours.(Scorecard).

2010s

- During a one-day international between Australia and Pakistan in January 2010, Pakistan captain Shahid Afridi was captured by television cameras making two solid biting motions into the ball; he was suspended for two matches after pleading guilty to ball tampering. In the same game, Pakistan player Khalid Latif was crash-tackled to the ground by a spectator who had run onto the ground to reach the cricketer, later leading to intense scrutiny of the WACA's security measures.
- In January 2012, Australian batsman David Warner scored a century off 69 balls against India, the equal fourth fastest hundred in Test cricket history shared with Shivnarine Chanderpaul of the West Indies (now equal sixth fastest).(Scorecard).
- Liam Davis and Adam Voges had a 343-run partnership for Western Australia v New South Wales in February 2012 (Scorecard). This ranks inside the top-five WA partnerships of all time and marked the best third-wicket WA partnership against NSW. Davis' score of 303* is the 16th highest score in Sheffield Shield history.
- The Guinness World Record for the highest basketball shot in the world was thrown from one of the four flood-light towers at the WACA (Video).
- In January 2014, the WACA hosted its third women's Test match, between England and Australia. In a low-scoring contest, in which the momentum ebbed and flowed until the final morning, England emerged the winner, by 61 runs, but Ellyse Perry of Australia was awarded player of the match (Scorecard). England's veteran captain Charlotte Edwards has since described the Test as "the most incredible match I'll ever play in".
- On 13 November 2015 David Warner scored 253 against New Zealand, which at the time was the second highest test score at the ground In the same game on 15 November, Ross Taylor scored 290, the highest total against an Australian team in Australia. Also he overtook Warner's score in the previous innings to make the second highest test score at the ground.
- On 14 December 2017, WACA hosted its final Ashes Test, and possibly final international match. In that match, both Dawid Malan (140) and Mitchell Marsh scored their maiden Test centuries (Marsh reached 181) and Jonny Bairstow scored his first century in Australia, Steve Smith scored his maiden home Test double-century, then went on to his highest Test score (239). Smith and Marsh also achieved the highest partnership for the 5th wicket at the WACA (301). The match ended with Australia regaining the Ashes.(Scorecard).
- On 25 January 2018, the WACA hosted its final Big Bash League match – Perth Scorchers V Adelaide Strikers.

2020s

- Between 6–9 March 2026, the WACA Ground hosted its first Day Night Test Match and first Women's Day Night Test Match between Australia and India.

== Test cricket records ==
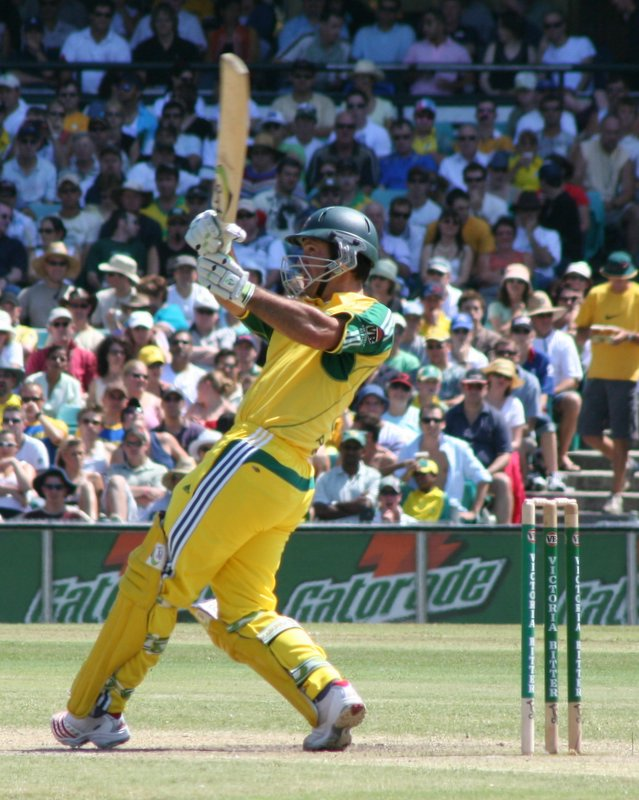
Ricky Ponting holds the record for most career runs at the WACA.

=== Batting ===
Most career runs
Runs	Player	Period
965 (26 innings)	(Australia) Ricky Ponting	1995–2012
931 (26 innings)	(Australia) Allan Border	1979–1993
846 (19 innings)	(Australia) David Boon	1985–1995
843 (21 innings)	(Australia) Steve Waugh	1986–2003
825 (10 innings)	(Australia) David Warner	2012–2017

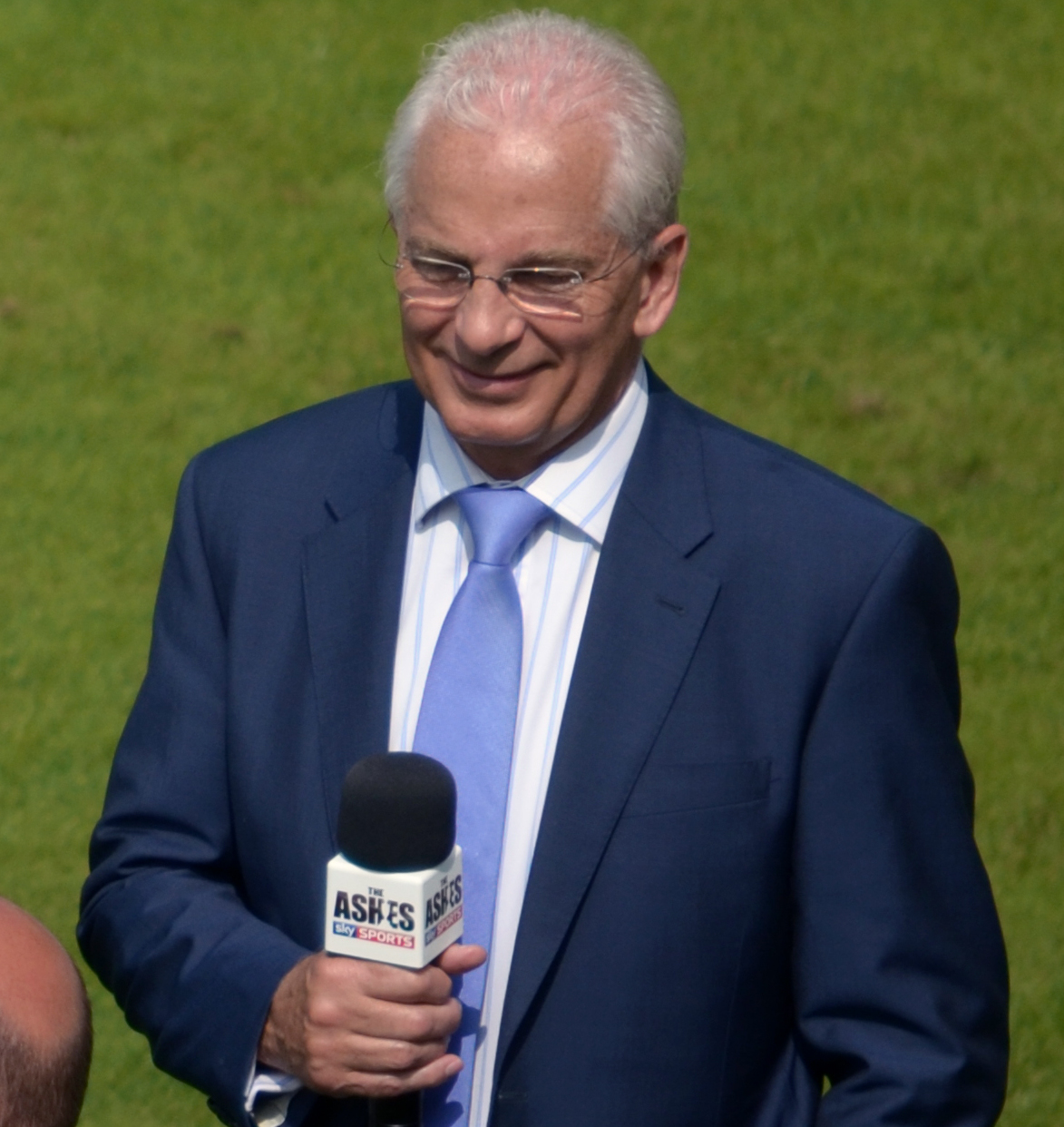
David Gower holds the record for most career runs at the ground by a non-Australian.

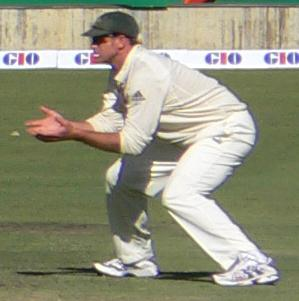
Matthew Hayden scored 380 against Zimbabwe in 2003, the highest score at the ground.

Most career runs (non-Australia)
Runs	Player	Period
471 (10 innings)	(England) David Gower	1978–1991
422 (6 innings)	(South Africa) AB de Villiers	2005–2012
326 (2 innings)	(New Zealand) Ross Taylor	2015–2015
320 (6 innings)	(South Africa) Graeme Smith	2005–2012
319 (6 innings)	(England) Geoffrey Boycott	1970–1979

Highest individual scores
Runs	Player	Date
380 v. Zimbabwe	(Australia) Matthew Hayden	9 Oct 2003
290 v. Australia	(New Zealand) Ross Taylor	13 Nov 2015
253 v. New Zealand	(Australia) David Warner	13 Nov 2015
239 v. England	(Australia) Steve Smith	14 Dec 2017
231 v. Sri Lanka	(Australia) Michael Slater	8 Dec 1995

Most centuries
Centuries	Player	Period
3 (9 innings)	(Australia) Steve Smith	2010–2024
3 (10 innings)	(Australia) David Warner	2012–2017
2 (6 innings)	(South Africa) AB de Villiers	2005–2012
2 (7 innings)	(Australia) Dean Jones	1986–1992
2 (9 innings)	(Australia) Michael Slater	1993–2000
2 (10 innings)	(England) David Gower	1978–1991
2 (13 innings)	(Australia) Greg Chappell	1970–1983
2 (14 innings)	(Australia) Adam Gilchrist	1999–2008
2 (15 innings)	(Australia) Michael Hussey	2005–2012
2 (16 innings)	(Australia) Mark Waugh	1991–2001
2 (16 innings)	(Australia) Justin Langer	1993–2006
2 (19 innings)	(Australia) David Boon	1985–1995
2 (26 innings)	(Australia) Allan Border	1979–1993

Highest batting average (3+ matches)
Average	Player	Period
84.40 (6 innings, 1 NO)	(South Africa) AB de Villiers	2005–2012
82.50 (10 innings, 0 NO)	(Australia) David Warner	2012–2017
81.33 (7 innings, 1 NO)	(Australia) Dean Jones	1986–1992
70.75 (6 innings, 2 NO)	(Australia) Ian Redpath	1970–1975
69.50 (6 innings, 2 NO)	(New Zealand) Martin Crowe	1985–1993

=== Bowling ===
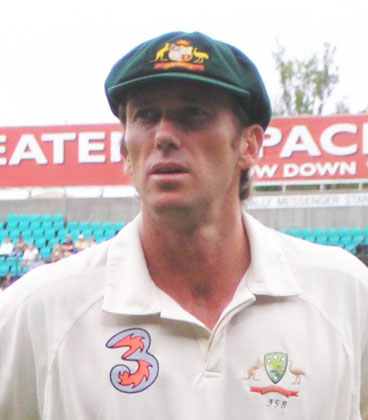
Glenn McGrath took 52 wickets in 24 innings, the most by any bowler.

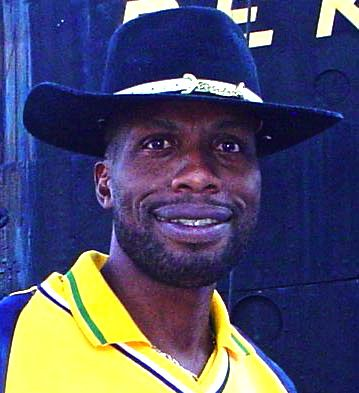
Curtly Ambrose took 24 wickets in six innings, the most by a non-Australian.

Most career wickets
Wickets	Player	Period
52 (24 innings)	(Australia) Glenn McGrath	1993–2006
45 (14 innings)	(Australia) Mitchell Johnson	2008–2015
40 (16 innings)	(Australia) Brett Lee	2000–2008
39 (11 innings)	(Australia) Merv Hughes	1988–1993
38 (15 innings)	(Australia) Craig McDermott	1985–1995

Most career wickets (non-Australia)
Wickets	Player	Period
24 (6 innings)	(Cricket West Indies) Curtly Ambrose	1988–1997
18 (4 innings)	(New Zealand) Richard Hadlee	1980–1985
14 (8 innings)	(England) Ian Botham	1978–1986
14 (8 innings)	(England) Bob Willis	1974–1982
13 (4 innings)	(Cricket West Indies) Ian Bishop	1993–1997

Best innings figures
Figures	Player	Date
8/24 v. Pakistan	(Australia) Glenn McGrath	1 Dec 2004
8/61 v. South Africa	(Australia) Mitchell Johnson	17 Dec 2008
8/87 v. West Indies	(Australia) Merv Hughes	2 Dec 1988
8/97 v. England	(Australia) Craig McDermott	1 Feb 1991
7/25 v. Australia	(Cricket West Indies) Curtly Ambrose	30 Jan 1993
7/27 v. India	(Australia) Mike Whitney	1 Feb 1992
7/54 v. Australia	(Cricket West Indies) Andy Roberts	12 Dec 1975

Best match figures
Figures	Player	Date
13/217 v. West Indies	(Australia) Merv Hughes	2 Dec 1988
11/95 v. India	(Australia) Mike Whitney	1 Feb 1992
11/118 v. Pakistan	(Australia) Carl Rackemann	11 Nov 1983
11/155 v. Australia	(New Zealand) Richard Hadlee	30 Nov 1985
11/157 v. England	(Australia) Craig McDermott	1 Feb 1991
11/159 v. South Africa	(Australia) Mitchell Johnson	17 Dec 2008
11/176 v. Australia	(England) Ian Botham	14 Dec 1979

Lowest strike rate (4+ innings)
Strike rate	Player	Period
26.5 (13 wickets)	(Cricket West Indies) Ian Bishop	1993–1997
26.6 (24 wickets)	(Cricket West Indies) Curtly Ambrose	1988–1997
28.0 (18 wickets)	(Australia) Michael Kasprowicz	1997–2004
30.7 (14 wickets)	(Australia) Damien Fleming	1998–1999
32.9 (11 wickets)	(Cricket West Indies) Michael Holding	1975–1984

=== Team records ===
Highest innings scores
Score	Team	Date
6/735d	Australia v. Zimbabwe	9 Oct 2003
6/662d	Australia v. England	14 Dec 2017
624	New Zealand v. Australia	13 Nov 2015
5/617d	Australia v. Sri Lanka	8 Dec 1995
8/592d	England v. Australia	28 Nov 1986

Lowest completed innings
Score	Team	Date
62	Pakistan v. Australia	13 Nov 1981
72	Pakistan v. Australia	16 Dec 2004
76	Australia v. West Indies	9 Nov 1984
104	Australia v. India	22 Nov 2024
112	England v. Australia	28 Nov 1998

=== Partnership records ===
Highest partnerships
Runs	Wicket	Players	Match	Date
327	5th	Ricky Ponting (197) & Justin Langer (144)	Australia v. Pakistan	26 Nov 1999
302	2nd	David Warner (253) & Usman Khawaja (121)	Australia v. New Zealand	13 Nov 2015
301	5th	Steve Smith (239) & Mitchell Marsh (181)	Australia v. England	14 Dec 2017
265	3rd	Ross Taylor (290) & Kane Williamson (166)	New Zealand v. Australia	13 Nov 2015
259	2nd	Wayne Phillips (159) & Graham Yallop (141)	Australia v. Pakistan	11 Nov 1983

Highest partnerships by wicket
Runs	Wicket	Players	Match	Date
228	1st	Michael Slater (219) & Mark Taylor (96)	Australia v. Sri Lanka	8 Dec 1995
302	2nd	David Warner (253) & Usman Khawaja (121)	Australia v. New Zealand	13 Nov 2015
265	3rd	Ross Taylor (290) & Kane Williamson (166)	New Zealand v. Australia	13 Nov 2015
207	4th	Matthew Hayden (380) & Steve Waugh (78)	Australia v. Zimbabwe	9 Oct 2003
327	5th	Ricky Ponting (197) & Justin Langer (144)	Australia v. Pakistan	26 Nov 1999
233	6th	Matthew Hayden (380) & Adam Gilchrist (113*)	Australia v. Zimbabwe	9 Oct 2003
149	7th	Jeff Dujon (139) & Larry Gomes (127)	(Cricket West Indies) West Indies v. Australia	9 Nov 1984
253	8th	Nathan Astle (156*) & Adam Parore (110)	New Zealand v. Australia	30 Nov 2001
81	9th	Sachin Tendulkar (114) & Kiran More (43)	India v. Australia	1 Feb 1992
87	10th	Mitchell Starc (68*) & Nathan Lyon (31)	Australia v. South Africa	30 Nov 2012

Last updated 4 July 2022.

== Cricket museum ==
The WACA has a temporarily closed cricket museum just next to the ground. Visitors can view memorabilia of Australian cricket. They display not only the history of cricket, but also other sports played at the WACA. This will be reopened with the Prindiville Building redevelopment in late 2025 / early 2026.
