= Denise Emerson =

Australian cricketer (born 1960)

Personal information
- Full name: Denise Emerson
- Born: 13 May 1960 (age 66); Subiaco, Perth, Western Australia
- Batting: Right-handed
- Role: Batter
- Relatives: Terry Alderman (brother); Ross Emerson (husband)

International information
- National side: Australia (1982–1987)
- Test debut (cap 105): 13 December 1984 v England
- Last Test: 21 August 1987 v England
- ODI debut (cap 25): 10 January 1982 v India
- Last ODI: 25 July 1987 v England

Domestic team information
- Years: Team
- 1978/79–1983/84: Western Australia
- 1986/87–1987/88: New South Wales

Career statistics
Competition	WTest	WODI	WFC	WLA
Matches	7	21	23	47
Runs scored	454	820	1,347	1,478
Batting average	41.27	41.00	51.80	35.19
100s/50s	1/3	0/8	3/7	0/12
Top score	121	84	141	99*
Balls bowled	–	–	22	–
Wickets	–	–	0	–
Bowling average	–	–	–	–
5 wickets in innings	–	–	0	–
10 wickets in match	–	–	0	–
Best bowling	–	–	–	–
Catches/stumpings	3/–	2/–	11/–	9/–
- Source: CricketArchive, 17 January 2023

Denise Emerson (née Alderman; born 13 May 1960) is an Australian former cricketer who played as a right-handed batter. She appeared in seven Test matches and 21 One Day Internationals for Australia between 1982 and 1987, including playing at the 1982 World Cup. She played domestic cricket for Western Australia and New South Wales.

Her brother Terry Alderman played at Test level for the Australian men's team. She is married to the umpire Ross Emerson.
