= 2026 Women's Super50 Cup =

Women's cricket tournament in the West Indies

- Dates: 27 January – 31 January 2026
- Administrator: Cricket West Indies
- Cricket format: List A
- Tournament format(s): Single round-robin and playoffs
- Host: St. Vincent and the Grenadines
- Champions: Jamaica
- Participants: 6
- Matches: 9
- Most runs: –
- Most wickets: –

The 2026 Women's Super50 Cup was the 38th edition of the Women's Super50 Cup, a women's List A cricket competition played in the West Indies. The tournament began from 24 February and concluded on 7 March 2025, with the 6 local teams that participated and all matches were held in St. Vincent and the Grenadines. The tournament was followed by the 2026 Twenty20 Blaze. Trinidad and Tobago were the defending champions.

== Competition format ==
The matches were played in a round-robin format with 50 overs per side in a group of six, therefore each team played 3 matches overall, The top team in the group was crowned the Champions. This year, the teams competed for a championship prize of US$30,000 with the runners-up securing US$15,000.

The group worked on a points system with positions being based on the total points. Points were awarded as follows:

Win: 4 points
Abandoned/No Result: 2 points.
Loss: 0 points.

== Fixtures ==
In January 2026, CWI announced the fixtures for the tournament.

== Squads ==
Barbados	Guyana	Jamaica	Leeward Islands	Trinidad and Tobago	Windward Islands
Aaliyah Alleyne (c); Elecia Bowman; Eboni Brathwaite; Shanika Bruce; Asabi Callender; Dicoreya Collymore; Shamilia Connell; Naijanni Cumberbatch; Keila Elliott; Allison Gordon; Theanny Herbert-Mayers; Trishan Holder; Alisa Scantlebury; Shakera Selman	Shemaine Campbelle (c); Feona Benjamin; Analesia D'Aguiar; Shabika Gajnabi; Realeanna Grimmond; Sheneta Grimmond; Mandy Mangru; Danellie Manns; Tramaine Marks; Plaffiana Millington; Ashmini Munisar; Kaysia Schultz; Latoya Williams; Laurene Williams	Rashada Williams (c); Adanya Baugh; Abigail Bryce; Sherene Burnett; Jaunel Deers; Chrishana McKenzie; Aneisha Miller; Chedean Nation; Lena Scott; Stafanie Taylor; Neisha-Ann Waisome; Vanessa Watts; Celina Whyte; Kate Wilmott	Amanda Edwards (c); Kimberly Anthony; Katherine Bean-Rosario; Reniece Boyce; Kayzg Boyles; Jahzara Claxton; Shawnisha Hector; Qiana Joseph; Rozel Liburd; Tonya Martin; Davronique Maynard; Chey-Anne Moses; Jess St. John; Aaliyah Weekes	Karishma Ramharack (c); Kirbyina Alexander; Britney Cooper; Brianna Harricharan; Shriya Jairam; Djenaba Joseph; Amelia Khan; Lee-Ann Kirby; Anisa Mohammed; Nadia Mohammed; Samara Ramnath; Amrita Ramtahal; Shalini Samaroo; Shunelle Sawh	Zaida James (c); Holly Charles; Nerissa Crafton; Ashlene Edward; Afy Fletcher; Earnisha Fontaine; Aldith Gasper; Amiah Gilbert; Jannillea Glasgow; Shanel Mckie; Carena Noel; Selena Ross; Abini St. Jean; Jaeda Tyrell

== Points table ==
Pos	Team	Pld	W	L	NR	Pts	NRR
1	Jamaica (C)	3	2	1	0	10	—
2	Windward Islands	3	2	1	0	10	—
3	Guyana	3	2	1	0	10	—
4	Trinidad and Tobago	3	2	1	0	10	—
5	Barbados	3	1	2	0	5	—
6	Leeward Islands	3	0	3	0	0	—

(C) Champions

=== Match summary ===
Visitor team →	BAR	GUY	JAM	LEE	TTO	WWI
Home team ↓	BAR	GUY	JAM	LEE	TTO	WWI
Barbados				Barbados; 79 runs		
Guyana			Guyana; 5 wickets			
Jamaica						
Leeward Islands						
Trinidad and Tobago						Windward Islands; 91 runs
Windward Islands						

Home team won	Visitor team won

- Note: Results listed are according to the home (horizontal) and visitor (vertical) teams.
- Note: Click on a result to see a summary of the match.
