= 2024 Women's Super50 Cup =

Cricket tournament

- Dates: 4 – 13 March 2024
- Administrator(s): Cricket West Indies
- Cricket format: List A
- Tournament format(s): Round-robin
- Champions: Jamaica (6th title)
- Participants: 6
- Matches: 15
- Most runs: Kycia Knight (272)
- Most wickets: Ashmini Munisar (12)

The 2024 Women's Super50 Cup, was the 36th edition of the Women's Super50 Cup, a women's List A cricket competition played in the West Indies. It took place from 4 to 13 March 2024, with 6 teams taking part and all matches taking place in Saint Kitts. The tournament was followed by the 2024 Twenty20 Blaze.

Jamaica won the tournament, winning their first title since 2014.

== Competition format ==
Teams played in a round-robin in a group of six, therefore playing 5 matches overall. Matches were played using a one day format with 50 overs per side. The top team in the group was crowned the Champions.

The group worked on a points system with positions being based on the total points. Points were awarded as follows:

Win: 4 points
Loss: 0 points.
Abandoned/No Result: 2 points.

== Points table ==
Team	Pld	W	L	T	NR	A	Pts	NRR
Jamaica (C)	5	4	1	0	0	0	16	+1.855
Guyana	5	4	1	0	0	0	16	+0.932
Windward Islands	5	3	2	0	0	0	12	+0.347
Barbados	5	3	2	0	0	0	12	–0.776
Trinidad and Tobago	5	1	4	0	0	0	4	–0.467
Leeward Islands	5	0	5	0	0	0	0	–1.642

Source: CricketArchive

== Fixtures ==
4 March 2024
Scorecard

Jamaica; 293 (46.5 overs)	v	Barbados; 89 (37.4 overs)
Stafanie Taylor 99 (99); Aaliyah Alleyne 3/24 (8.5 overs)		Naijanni Cumberbatch 22 (49); Stafanie Taylor 2/16 (6.4 overs)

Jamaica won by 204 runs
Warner Park Sporting Complex, Basseterre, Saint Kitts
Umpires: Vicki Daniel and Candace la Borde

- Jamaica won the toss and elected to bat.

4 March 2024
Scorecard

Guyana; 142 (36.4 overs)	v	Leeward Islands; 86 (36.5 overs)
Realeanna Grimmond 37 (66); Shawnisha Hector 3/11 (6.3 overs)		Divya Saxena 19 (86); Plaffiana Millington 4/10 (9.5 overs)

Guyana won by 56 runs
St. Paul's Sports Complex, Basseterre, Saint Kitts
Umpires: Maria Abbott and Carolyn Brown

- Leeward Islands won the toss and elected to field.

4 March 2024
Scorecard

Trinidad and Tobago; 185 (48.2 overs)	v	Windward Islands; 186/8 (49 overs)
Lee-Ann Kirby 59 (40); Afy Fletcher 3/40 (10 overs)		Jannillea Glasgow 62 (115); Karishma Ramharack 2/19 (10 overs)

Windward Islands won by 2 wickets
Conaree Sports Club, Basseterre, Saint Kitts
Umpires: Javed Persaud and Jacqueline Williams

- Trinidad and Tobago won the toss and elected to bat.

6 March 2024
Scorecard

Barbados; 186 (48.4 overs)	v	Trinidad and Tobago; 178/8 (50 overs)
Kycia Knight 90 (134); Karishma Ramharack 4/20 (9.4 overs)		Britney Cooper 34 (60); Aaliyah Alleyne 2/31 (10 overs)

Barbados won by 8 runs
St. Paul's Sports Complex, Basseterre, Saint Kitts
Umpires: Carolyn Brown and Jacqueline Williams

- Barbados won the toss and elected to bat.

6 March 2024
Scorecard

Guyana; 207/8 (50 overs)	v	Windward Islands; 163 (40.2 overs)
Shabika Gajnabi 61 (102); Carena Noel 3/47 (7 overs)		Nerissa Crafton 47 (54); Plaffiana Millington 2/23 (9 overs)

Guyana won by 44 runs
Warner Park Sporting Complex, Basseterre, Saint Kitts
Umpires: Ayanna Holder and Candace la Borde

- Windward Islands won the toss and elected to bowl.

6 March 2024
Scorecard

Leeward Islands; 98 (35.1 overs)	v	Jamaica; 99/1 (11.2 overs)
Reniece Boyce 37 (70); Vanessa Watts 3/15 (7.1 overs)		Chedean Nation 61* (29); Amanda Edwards 1/39 (5 overs)

Jamaica won by 9 wickets
Conaree Sports Club, Basseterre, Saint Kitts
Umpires: Maria Abbott and Javed Persaud

- Leeward Islands won the toss and elected to bat.

8 March 2024
Scorecard

Guyana; 128 (37.1 overs)	v	Barbados; 129 (41.2 overs)
Shemaine Campbelle 53 (84); Allison Gordon 4/19 (7.1 overs)		Kycia Knight 69* (124); Nyia Latchman 2/19 (10 overs)

Barbados won by 4 wickets
St. Paul's Sports Complex, Basseterre, Saint Kitts
Umpires: Vicki Daniel and Jacqueline Williams

- Guyana won the toss and elected to bat.

8 March 2024
Scorecard

Trinidad and Tobago; 168 (43.1 overs)	v	Jamaica; 172/5 (31.4 overs)
Lee-Ann Kirby 48 (56); Kate Wilmott 3/33 (7 overs)		Chedean Nation 70 (78); Samara Ramnath 3/24 (6 overs)

Jamaica won by 5 wickets
Conaree Sports Club, Basseterre, Saint Kitts
Umpires: Maria Abbott and Javed Persaud

- Trinidad and Tobago won the toss and elected to bat.

8 March 2024
Scorecard

Windward Islands; 270/5 (50 overs)	v	Leeward Islands; 155 (31.3 overs)
Zaida James 67 (73); Shawnisha Hector 2/34 (9 overs)		Jahzara Claxton 40* (55); Qiana Joseph 3/28 (7 overs)

Windward Islands won by 115 runs
Warner Park Sporting Complex, Basseterre, Saint Kitts
Umpires: Carolyn Brown and Candace la Borde

- Leeward Islands won the toss and elected to bowl.

11 March 2024
Scorecard

Guyana; 156/8 (50 overs)	v	Trinidad and Tobago; 94 (42 overs)
Shemaine Campbelle 52 (81); Karishma Ramharack 3/26 (10 overs)		Samara Ramnath 20 (52); Ashmini Munisar 5/15 (8 overs)

Guyana won by 62 runs
Conaree Sports Club, Basseterre, Saint Kitts
Umpires: Ayanna Holder and Jacqueline Williams

- Trinidad and Tobago won the toss and elected to bowl.

11 March 2024
Scorecard

Jamaica; 175/9 (45 overs)	v	Windward Islands; 176/7 (36.1 overs)
Pearl Etienne 58 (75); Chinelle Henry 6/31 (8 overs)		Rashada Williams 72 (101); Carena Noel 2/22 (4 overs)

Jamaica won by 3 wickets
St. Paul's Sports Complex, Basseterre, Saint Kitts
Umpires: Vicki Daniel and Candace la Borde

- Windward Islands won the toss and elected to bat.
- Match reduced to 45 overs per side due to rain.

11 March 2024
Scorecard

Leeward Islands; 255/5 (50 overs)	v	Barbados; 256/5 (46.2 overs)
Shawnisha Hector 56 (61); Naijanni Cumberbatch 1/33 (8 overs)		Kyshona Knight 88* (107); Shawnisha Hector 2/48 (9.2 overs)

Barbados won by 5 wickets
Warner Park Sporting Complex, Basseterre, Saint Kitts
Umpires: Maria Abbott and Javed Persaud

- Leeward Islands won the toss and elected to bat.

13 March 2024
Scorecard

Windward Islands; 233/9 (50 overs)	v	Barbados; 189/9 (50 overs)
Afy Fletcher 72 (81); Shamilia Connell 4/38 (10 overs)		Kycia Knight 64 (62); Qiana Joseph 2/21 (10 overs)

Windward Islands won by 44 runs
Conaree Sports Club, Basseterre, Saint Kitts
Umpires: Vicki Daniel and Javed Persaud

- Windward Islands won the toss and elected to bat.

13 March 2024
[ Scorecard]

Jamaica; 72 (27.1 overs)	v	Guyana; 74/5 (17.4 overs)
Rashada Williams 31 (55); Ashmini Munisar 3/11 (6 overs)		Mandy Mangru 24 (38); Jaunel Deers 2/4 (1.4 overs)

Guyana won by 5 wickets (DLS)
St. Paul's Sports Complex, Basseterre, Saint Kitts
Umpires: Maria Abbott and Candace la Borde

- Jamaica won the toss and elected to bat.
- Match reduced to 44 overs per side due to rain.

13 March 2024
Scorecard

Leeward Islands; 151 (40.2 overs)	v	Trinidad and Tobago; 152/6 (41.1 overs)
Reniece Boyce 48 (77); Caniesha Isaac 3/33 (8.2 overs)		Lee-Ann Kirby 48 (38); Amanda Edwards 3/17 (10 overs)

Trinidad and Tobago won by 4 wickets
Warner Park Sporting Complex, Basseterre, Saint Kitts
Umpires: Carolyn Brown and Jacqueline Williams

- Leeward Islands won the toss and elected to bat.

== Statistics ==
=== Most runs ===
Player	Team	Matches	Innings	Runs	Average	HS	100s	50s
Kycia Knight	Barbados	5	5	272	68.00	90	0	3
Chedean Nation	Jamaica	5	5	192	48.00	70	0	2
Shemaine Campbelle	Guyana	5	5	181	36.20	53	0	2
Lee-Ann Kirby	Trinidad and Tobago	5	5	181	36.20	59	0	1
Jannillea Glasgow	Windward Islands	5	5	170	42.50	62	0	2

Source: CricketArchive

=== Most wickets ===
Player	Team	Overs	Wickets	Average	BBI	5w
Ashmini Munisar	Guyana	38.0	12	8.25	5/15	1
Nyia Latchman	Guyana	34.1	11	9.90	3/27	0
Karishma Ramharack	Trinidad and Tobago	43.4	11	12.18	4/20	0
Samara Ramnath	Trinidad and Tobago	43.0	10	15.40	3/24	0
Vanessa Watts	Jamaica	42.1	9	12.77	3/15	0

Source: CricketArchive
