= 2024 Twenty20 Blaze =

Cricket tournament

- Dates: 17 – 25 March 2024
- Administrator: Cricket West Indies
- Cricket format: Twenty20
- Tournament format: Round-robin
- Champions: Jamaica (4th title)
- Participants: 6
- Matches: 15
- Most runs: Rashada Williams (183)
- Most wickets: Plaffiana Millington (11)

The 2024 Twenty20 Blaze was the eighth season of the Twenty20 Blaze, a women's Twenty20 cricket competition played in the West Indies. The tournament took place from 17 to 25 March 2024. Six teams took part in the competition, with all the matches being played at Warner Park. In February 2024, Cricket West Indies (CWI) confirmed the fixtures for the tournament. The tournament formed part of West Indies' preparation ahead of the 2024 ICC Women's T20 World Cup. Barbados were the defending champions.

Jamaica won the tournament, winning all five of their matches.

== Teams ==
The following teams took part in the tournament:

- Barbados
- Guyana
- Jamaica
- Leeward Islands
- Trinidad and Tobago
- Windward Islands

== Competition format ==
Teams played in a round-robin in a group of six, therefore playing 5 matches overall. Matches were played using a Twenty20 format. The top team in the group was crowned the Champions.

The group worked on a points system with positions being based on the total points. Points were awarded as follows:

Win: 4 points.
Loss: 0 points.
Abandoned/No Result: 2 points.

== Squads ==
The following squads were named for the competition:

Barbados Coach: Sherwin Campbell	Guyana Coach: Clive Grimmond	Jamaica Coach: Shane Brooks	Leeward Islands Coach: Percy Daniel	Trinidad and Tobago Coach: Gibran Mohammed	Windward Islands Coach: Petra Lynch
Kycia Knight (c); Kyshona Knight; Aaliyah Alleyne; Shanika Bruce; Asabi Callender; Zaliya Camobelle; Shamilia Connell; Naijanni Cumberbatch; Erin Deane; Keila Elliott; Allison Gordon; Theanny Herbert-Mayers; Trishan Holder; Alisa Scantlebury	Shemaine Campbelle (c); Naomi Barkoye; Shabika Gajnabi; Trisha Hardat; Plaffianna Millington; Sheneta Grimmond; Realeanna Grimmond; Ashmini Munisar; Cherry-Ann Fraser; Mandy Mangru; Kaysia Schultz; Cyanna Retemiah; Nyia Latchman	Stafanie Taylor (c); Rashada Williams; Natasha McLean; Vanessa Watts; Keneshia Ferron; Neisha-Ann Waisome; Chedean Nation; Kate Wilmott; Nicole Campbell; Celina Whyte; Abigail Bryce; Jaunel Deers; Jessica Garcia	Amanda Edwards (c); Terez Parker; Tyynetta McKoy; Reniece Boyce; Melicia Clarke; Rozel Liburd; Shawnisha Hector; Tonya Martin; Chey-Anne Moses; Shebani Bhaskar; Kimberley Anthony; Jahzara Claxton; Divya Saxena; Saneldo Willett	Britney Cooper (c); Steffie Soogrim; Karishma Ramharack; Djenaba Joseph; Kirbyina Alexander; Shunelle Sawh; Samara Ramnath; Selene Oneil; Shalini Samaroo; Lee-Ann Kirby; KD Jazz Mitchell; Caneisha Isaac; Shanice Pascall; Brianna Harricharan	Afy Fletcher (c); Malika Edward; Zaida James; Qiana Joseph; Kimone Homer; Carena Noel; Jannelia Glasgow; Pearl Etienne; Earnisha Fontaine; Tracy Byron; Nerissa Crafton; Amiah Gilbert; Namiah Marcellin; Selena Ross

== Points table ==
Team	Pld	W	L	T	NR	A	Pts	NRR
Jamaica (C)	5	5	0	0	0	0	20	+1.316
Guyana	5	3	2	0	0	0	12	+1.502
Trinidad and Tobago	5	2	3	0	0	0	8	–0.219
Barbados	5	2	3	0	0	0	8	–0.737
Leeward Islands	5	2	3	0	0	0	8	–0.825
Windward Islands	5	1	4	0	0	0	4	–0.988
Source: CricTracker

== Fixtures ==
17 March 2024
Scorecard

Leeward Islands; 139/7 (20 overs)	v	Barbados; 127/5 (20 overs)
Reniece Boyce 67 (52); Naijanni Cumberbatch 4/9 (4 overs)		Kyshona Knight 50 (53); Rozel Liburd 2/18 (3 overs)

Leeward Islands won by 12 runs
Warner Park Sporting Complex, Basseterre
Umpires: Vicki Daniel and Javed Persaud

- Leeward Islands won the toss and elected to bat.

17 March 2024
Scorecard

Trinidad and Tobago; 66 (18.3 overs)	v	Guyana; 67/3 (11 overs)
Shunelle Sawh 15 (16); Plaffiana Millington 4/5 (3.3 overs)		Shabika Gajnabi 24* (31); Brianna Harricharan 1/6 (1 over)

Guyana won by 7 wickets
Warner Park Sporting Complex, Basseterre
Umpires: Maria Abbott and Carolyn Brown

- Trinidad and Tobago won the toss and elected to bat.

17 March 2024
Scorecard

Windward Islands; 117/5 (20 overs)	v	Jamaica; 118/3 (16 overs)
Qiana Joseph 56 (55); Chedean Nation 3/19 (3 overs)		Rashada Williams 52 (35); Zaida James 2/16 (4 overs)

Jamaica won by 7 wickets
Warner Park Sporting Complex, Basseterre
Umpires: Ayanna Holder and Joel Wilson

- Windward Islands won the toss and elected to bat.

19 March 2024
Scorecard

Barbados; 123/5 (20 overs)	v	Windward Islands; 104/8 (20 overs)
Trishan Holder 68* (54); Zaida James 2/28 (4 overs)		Afy Fletcher 28 (32); Erin Deane 2/12 (4 overs)

Barbados won by 19 runs
Warner Park Sporting Complex, Basseterre
Umpires: Vicki Daniel and Joel Wilson

- Barbados won the toss and elected to bat.

19 March 2024
Scorecard

Leeward Islands; 78/6 (20 overs)	v	Trinidad and Tobago; 79/1 (11.4 overs)
Jahzara Claxton 25* (36); Steffi Soogrim 1/6 (4 overs)		Djenaba Joseph 22* (28); Shawnisha Hector 1/10 (3 overs)

Trinidad and Tobago won by 9 wickets
Warner Park Sporting Complex, Basseterre
Umpires: Carolyn Brown and Javed Persaud

- Leeward Islands won the toss and elected to bat.

19 March 2024
Scorecard

Guyana; 107/7 (20 overs)	v	Jamaica; 108/5 (18.1 overs)
Mandy Mangru 36 (39); Stafanie Taylor 2/12 (4 overs)		Rashada Williams 42 (55); Nyia Latchman 2/15 (3.1 overs)

Jamaica won by 5 wickets
Warner Park Sporting Complex, Basseterre
Umpires: Maria Abbott and Candace la Borde

- Guyana won the toss and elected to bat.

21 March 2024
Scorecard

Windward Islands; 81 (20 overs)	v	Trinidad and Tobago; 84/8 (18.2 overs)
Jannillea Glasgow 36 (45); Shalini Samaroo 3/14 (4 overs)		Djenaba Joseph 43 (43); Zaida James 3/10 (4 overs)

Trinidad and Tobago won by 2 wickets
Warner Park Sporting Complex, Basseterre
Umpires: Carolyn Brown and Javed Persaud

- Trinidad and Tobago won the toss and elected to bowl.

21 March 2024
Scorecard

Barbados; 63 (17.3 overs)	v	Jamaica; 69/4 (11.4 overs)
Nanijanni Cumberbatch 25 (42); Chinelle Henry 4/9 (3.3 overs)		Rashada Williams 21 (15); Naijanni Cumberbatch 1/12 (1.1 overs)

Jamaica won by 6 wickets
Warner Park Sporting Complex, Basseterre
Umpires: Candace la Borde and Joel Wilson

- Barbados won the toss and elected to bat.

21 March 2024
Scorecard

Leeward Islands; 104/9 (20 overs)	v	Guyana; 100/9 (20 overs)
Divya Saxena 42 (39); Nyia Latchman 2/10 (4 overs)		Shabika Gajnabi 44 (52); Jahzara Claxton 3/13 (3 overs)

Leeward Islands won by 4 runs
Warner Park Sporting Complex, Basseterre
Umpires: Maria Abbott and Ayanna Holder

- Guyana won the toss and elected to bowl.

23 March 2024
Scorecard

Trinidad and Tobago; 98/8 (20 overs)	v	Jamaica; 99/2 (17.1 overs)
Britney Cooper 44* (53); Vanessa Watts 3/10 (4 overs)		Natasha McLean 41 (34); Steffi Soogrim 1/15 (4 overs)

Jamaica won by 8 wickets
Warner Park Sporting Complex, Basseterre
Umpires: Maria Abbott and Javed Persaud

- Jamaica won the toss and elected to bowl.

23 March 2024
Scorecard

Guyana; 108/6 (20 overs)	v	Barbados; 66 (19.5 overs)
Shabika Gajnabi 52 (53); Allison Gordon 2/16 (3 overs)		Kycia Knight 17 (30); Ashmini Munisar 3/8 (4 overs)

Guyana won by 42 runs
Warner Park Sporting Complex, Basseterre
Umpires: Carolyn Brown and Joel Wilson

- Barbados won the toss and elected to bowl.

23 March 2024
Scorecard

Leeward Islands; 89/7 (20 overs)	v	Windward Islands; 91/4 (15 overs)
Amanda Edwards 30 (37); Pearl Etienne 2/5 (4 overs)		Qiana Joseph 37 (39); Rozel Liburd 3/19 (3 overs)

Windward Islands won by 6 wickets
Warner Park Sporting Complex, Basseterre
Umpires: Vicki Daniel and Candace la Borde

- Windward Islands won the toss and elected to bowl.

25 March 2024
Scorecard

Guyana; 131/4 (20 overs)	v	Windward Islands; 62 (15.3 overs)
Mandy Mangru 51* (50); Pearl Etienne 2/18 (4 overs)		Zaida James 21 (28); Kaysia Schultz 5/14 (4 overs)

Guyana won by 69 runs
Warner Park Sporting Complex, Basseterre
Umpires: Ayanna Holder and Candace la Borde

- Guyana won the toss and elected to bat.

25 March 2024
Scorecard

Leeward Islands; 124/5 (20 overs)	v	Jamaica; 127/2 (18.2 overs)
Amanda Edwards 35* (25); Chedean Nation 2/21 (4 overs)		Stafanie Taylor 48* (33); Shawnisha Hector 1/23 (2.2 overs)

Jamaica won by 8 wickets
Warner Park Sporting Complex, Basseterre
Umpires: Vicki Daniel and Joel Wilson

- Jamaica won the toss and elected to bowl.

25 March 2024
Scorecard

Barbados; 96 (19.5 overs)	v	Trinidad and Tobago; 83 (18.1 overs)
Kyshona Knight 25 (27); Steffi Soogrim 5/8 (4 overs)		Lee-Ann Kirby 30 (32); Erin Deane 5/14 (4 overs)

Barbados won by 13 runs
Warner Park Sporting Complex, Basseterre
Umpires: Maria Abbott and Carolyn Brown

- Barbados won the toss and elected to bat.

== Statistics ==
=== Most runs ===
Player	Team	Matches	Innings	Runs	Average	HS	100s	50s
Rashada Williams	Jamaica	5	5	183	45.75	52	0	1
Shabika Gajnabi	Guyana	5	5	138	34.50	52	0	1
Shemaine Campbelle	Guyana	5	5	128	25.60	47	0	0
Stafanie Taylor	Jamaica	5	5	128	25.60	48*	0	0
Mandy Mangru	Guyana	5	4	111	37.00	51*	0	1

Source: CricketArchive

=== Most wickets ===
Player	Team	Overs	Wickets	Average	BBI	5w
Plaffiana Millington	Guyana	18.2	11	4.81	4/5	0
Erin Deane	Barbados	18.0	10	8.80	5/14	1
Chinelle Henry	Jamaica	18.3	8	12.25	4/9	0
Steffi Soogrim	Trinidad and Tobago	15.0	7	4.71	5/8	1
Kaysia Schultz	Guyana	11.0	7	6.42	5/14	1

Source: CricketArchive
