= 2026 Twenty20 Blaze =

Cricket tournament

- Dates: 13 – 23 January 2026
- Administrator: Cricket West Indies
- Cricket format: Twenty20
- Tournament format: Round-robin
- Host: Saint Vincent and the Grenadines
- Champions: Leeward Islands (1st title)
- Participants: 6
- Matches: 18
- Most runs: Shawnisha Hector (136)
- Most wickets: Ashmini Munisar (13)

The 2026 Twenty20 Blaze was the tenth season of the Twenty20 Blaze, a women's Twenty20 cricket competition played in the West Indies. The tournament took place from 13 to 23 January 2026. Six teams took part in the competition, with all the matches being played at Arnos Vale Playing Field in Kingstown. In January 2026, Cricket West Indies (CWI) confirmed the fixtures for the tournament. Guyana were the defending champions.

Leeward Islands won the tournament, defeating Barbados by six runs in the final using the DLS method. The victory gave Leeward Islands their first Twenty20 Blaze title.

== Teams ==
The following teams took part in the tournament:

- Barbados
- Guyana
- Jamaica
- Leeward Islands
- Trinidad and Tobago
- Windward Islands

== Competition format ==
Teams played in a round-robin in a group of six, therefore playing 5 matches overall. Matches were played using a Twenty20 format with the top two teams advanced to the final. This year, the teams competed for a championship prize of US$30,000 with the runners-up securing US$15,000.

The group worked on a points system with positions being based on the total points. Points were awarded as follows:

Win: 4 points
Abandoned/No Result: 2 points.
Loss: 0 points.

== Squads ==
Barbados	Guyana	Jamaica	Leeward Islands	Trinidad and Tobago	Windward Islands
Aaliyah Alleyne (c); Elecia Bowman; Eboni Brathwaite; Shanika Bruce; Asabi Callender; Dicoreya Collymore; Shamilia Connell; Naijanni Cumberbatch; Keila Elliott; Allison Gordon; Theanny Herbert-Mayers; Trishan Holder; Alisa Scantlebury; Shakera Selman	Shemaine Campbelle (c); Feona Benjamin; Analesia D'Aguiar; Shabika Gajnabi; Realeanna Grimmond; Sheneta Grimmond; Mandy Mangru; Danellie Manns; Tramaine Marks; Plaffiana Millington; Ashmini Munisar; Kaysia Schultz; Latoya Williams; Laurene Williams	Rashada Williams (c); Adanya Baugh; Abigail Bryce; Sherene Burnett; Jaunel Deers; Chrishana McKenzie; Aneisha Miller; Chedean Nation; Lena Scott; Stafanie Taylor; Neisha-Ann Waisome; Vanessa Watts; Celina Whyte; Kate Wilmott	Amanda Edwards (c); Kimberly Anthony; Katherine Bean-Rosario; Reniece Boyce; Kayzg Boyles; Jahzara Claxton; Shawnisha Hector; Qiana Joseph; Rozel Liburd; Tonya Martin; Davronique Maynard; Chey-Anne Moses; Jess St. John; Aaliyah Weekes	Karishma Ramharack (c); Kirbyina Alexander; Britney Cooper; Brianna Harricharan; Shriya Jairam; Djenaba Joseph; Amelia Khan; Lee-Ann Kirby; Anisa Mohammed; Nadia Mohammed; Samara Ramnath; Amrita Ramtahal; Shalini Samaroo; Shunelle Sawh	Zaida James (c); Holly Charles; Nerissa Crafton; Ashlene Edward; Afy Fletcher; Earnisha Fontaine; Aldith Gasper; Amiah Gilbert; Jannillea Glasgow; Shanel Mckie; Carena Noel; Selena Ross; Abini St. Jean; Jaeda Tyrell

== Points table ==
Pos	Team	Pld	W	L	NR	Pts	NRR	Qualification
1	Leeward Islands (C)	5	5	0	0	43	0.000	Advanced to the final
2	Barbados (R)	5	4	1	0	32	0.000	Advanced to the final
3	Trinidad and Tobago	5	2	3	0	23	0.000	Advanced to the 3rd place playoff
4	Guyana	5	2	3	0	18	0.000	Advanced to the 3rd place playoff
5	Jamaica	5	2	3	0	17	0.000	Advanced to the 5th place playoff
6	Windward Islands	5	0	5	0	5	0.000	Advanced to the 5th place playoff

Source: Cricket West Indies
(C) Champions; (R) Runners-up

=== Match summary ===
Visitor team →	BAR	GUY	JAM	LEE	TTO	WWI
Home team ↓	BAR	GUY	JAM	LEE	TTO	WWI
Barbados			Barbados; 6 wickets			Barbados; 3 wickets
Guyana	Barbados; 22 runs			Leeward Islands; 7 runs	Trinidad and Tobago; 8 wickets	
Jamaica		Guyana; 4 wickets		Leeward Islands; 9 runs		
Leeward Islands	Leeward Islands; 31 runs				Leeward Islands; 4 wickets	
Trinidad and Tobago	Barbados; 3 wickets		Jamaica; 3 wickets			
Windward Islands		Guyana; 7 runs	Jamaica; 7 wickets	Leeward Islands; 7 wickets	Trinidad and Tobago; 16 runs	

Home team won	Visitor team won

- Note: Results listed are according to the home (horizontal) and visitor (vertical) teams.
- Note: Click on a result to see a summary of the match.

== Fixtures ==
In January 2026, CWI announced the fixtures for the tournament.

Match 1
13 January 2026
09:30
Scorecard

Windward Islands; 89/5 (20 overs)	v	Guyana; 96/5 (20 overs)
Shabika Gajnabi 38 (37); Carena Noel 1/14 (3 overs)		Shabika Gajnabi 38 (37); Afy Fletcher 1/20 (4 overs)

Guyana won by 7 runs
Arnos Vale Playing Field, Kingstown
Umpires: Patrick Gustard and Carolyn Brown

- Windward Islands won the toss and elected to field.

Match 2
13 January 2026
13:30
Scorecard

Jamaica; 99/8 (20 overs)	v	Leeward Islands; 108/5 (20 overs)
Stafanie Taylor 31 (34); Chedean Nation 2/15 (4 overs)		Shawnisha Hector 56 (55); Chedean Nation 2/15 (4 overs)

Leeward Islands won by 9 runs
Arnos Vale Playing Field, Kingstown
Umpires: Patrick Gustard and Afron Byam

- Jamaica won the toss and elected to field.

Match 3
13 January 2026
17:30
Scorecard

Trinidad and Tobago; 97/5 (20 overs)	v	Barbados; 99/7 (18.3 overs)
Britney Cooper 33 (36); Naijanni Cumberbatch 2/18 (4 overs)		Aaliyah Alleyne 24 (23); Naijanni Cumberbatch 2/18 (4 overs)

Barbados won by 3 wickets
Arnos Vale Playing Field, Kingstown
Umpires: Jacqueline Williams and Maria Abbott

- Barbados won the toss and elected to field.

Match 4
15 January 2026
09:30
Scorecard

Barbados; 111/4 (17 overs)	v	Jamaica; 110/6 (20 overs)

Barbados won by 6 wickets
Arnos Vale Playing Field, Kingstown
Umpires: Shannon Crawford and Maria Abbott

- Barbados won the toss and elected to field.

Match 5
15 January 2026
13:30
Scorecard

Windward Islands; 79 (19.3 overs)	v	Trinidad and Tobago; 95/7 (20 overs)
		Anisa Mohammed 29 (30); Carena Noel 3/15 (4 overs)

Trinidad and Tobago won by 16 runs
Arnos Vale Playing Field, Kingstown
Umpires: Shannon Crawford and Jacqueline Williams

- Windward Islands won the toss and elected to field.

Match 6
15 January 2026
17:30
Scorecard

Guyana; 99 (20 overs)	v	Leeward Islands; 106/9 (20 overs)
		Reniece Boyce 51 (54); Ashmini Munisar 4/15 (4 overs)

Leeward Islands won by 7 runs
Arnos Vale Playing Field, Kingstown
Umpires: Carolyn Brown and Afron Byam

- Guyana won the toss and elected to field.

Match 7
17 January 2026
09:30
Scorecard

Leeward Islands; 75/6 (16.1 overs)	v	Trinidad and Tobago; 74/9 (20 overs)

Leeward Islands won by 4 wickets
Arnos Vale Playing Field, Kingstown
Umpires: Patrick Gustard and Afron Byam

- Leeward Islands won the toss and elected to field.

Match 8
17 January 2026
13:30
Scorecard

Barbados; 87/7 (16.1 overs)	v	Windward Islands; 86/8 (20 overs)

Barbados won by 3 wickets
Arnos Vale Playing Field, Kingstown

Match 9
17 January 2026
17:30
Scorecard

Jamaica; 87/9 (20 overs)	v	Guyana; 88/6 (15.3 overs)

Guyana won by 4 wickets
Arnos Vale Playing Field, Kingstown

Match 10
19 January 2026
09:30
Scorecard

Leeward Islands; 118/9 (20 overs)	v	Barbados; 87/9 (20 overs)
Naijanni Cumberbatch 5/15 (4 overs)

Leeward Islands won by 31 runs
Arnos Vale Playing Field, Kingstown
Umpires: Shannon Crawford and Maria Abbott

- Barbados won the toss and elected to field.

Match 11
19 January 2026
13:30
Scorecard

Trinidad and Tobago; 58/2 (13.2 overs)	v	Guyana; 57 (17 overs)

Trinidad and Tobago won by 8 wickets
Arnos Vale Playing Field, Kingstown

Match 12
19 January 2026
17:30
Scorecard

Jamaica; 100/3 (16.5 overs)	v	Windward Islands; 99/7 (20 overs)

Jamaica won by 7 wickets
Arnos Vale Playing Field, Kingstown

Match 13
21 January 2026
09:30
Scorecard

Trinidad and Tobago; 76/8 (17 overs)	v	Jamaica; 79/7 (15.2 overs)
Djenaba Joseph 27 (30); Stafanie Taylor 3/9 (3 overs)

Jamaica won by 3 wickets (DLS method)
Arnos Vale Playing Field, Kingstown
Umpires: Leslie Reifer and Carolyn Brown

- Jamaica won the toss and elected to field.
- The match was reduced to 17 overs per side due to rain.

Match 14
21 January 2026
13:30
Scorecard

Guyana; 70 (19.4 overs)	v	Barbados; 92/8 (20 overs)

Barbados won by 22 runs
Arnos Vale Playing Field, Kingstown

Match 15
21 January 2026
17:30
Scorecard

Windward Islands; 69/9 (20 overs)	v	Leeward Islands; 59/3 (8.4 overs)

Leeward Islands won by 7 wickets (DLS method)
Arnos Vale Playing Field, Kingstown

- The match was reduced to 14 overs per side due to rain.

== Play-offs ==
5th place playoff
23 January 2026
10:00
Scorecard

Jamaica; 65/0 (3.4 overs)	v	Windward Islands; 62/9 (20 overs)

Jamaica won by 10 wickets
Arnos Vale Playing Field, Kingstown

3rd place playoff
23 January 2026
14:00
Scorecard

Trinidad and Tobago; 104/7 (20 overs)	v	Guyana; 97 (19.4 overs)

Trinidad and Tobago won by 7 runs
Arnos Vale Playing Field, Kingstown

Final
23 January 2026
18:00
Scorecard

Leeward Islands; 111/6 (20 overs)	v	Barbados; 79/5 (16 overs)
Shawnisha Hector 58 (44)

Leeward Islands won by 6 runs (DLS method)
Arnos Vale Playing Field, Kingstown

- Match reduced to 16 overs per side due to rain
- Barbados' revised target was 86 runs
