= 2023 Women's Super50 Cup =

Cricket tournament

- Dates: 8 – 17 May 2023
- Administrator(s): Cricket West Indies
- Cricket format: 50 over
- Tournament format(s): Round-robin
- Champions: Barbados (5th title)
- Participants: 6
- Matches: 15

The 2023 Women's Super50 Cup, known for sponsorship reasons as the CG Insurance Women's Super50 Cup, was a women's 50-over cricket competition played in the West Indies. It took place from 8 to 17 May 2023, with 6 teams taking part and all matches taking place in Saint Kitts. The tournament was followed by the 2023 Twenty20 Blaze.

Barbados won the tournament, going unbeaten to win their fourth title in a row.

== Competition format ==
Teams played in a round-robin in a group of six, therefore playing 5 matches overall. Matches were played using a one day format with 50 overs per side. The top team in the group was crowned the Champions.

The group worked on a points system with positions being based on the total points. Points were awarded as follows:

Win: 4 points
Loss: 0 points.
Abandoned/No Result: 2 points.

== Points table ==
Team	Pld	W	L	T	NR	A	Pts	NRR
Barbados (C)	5	5	0	0	0	0	20	+2.902
Trinidad and Tobago	5	3	1	0	1	0	14	+0.564
Windward Islands	5	2	3	0	0	0	8	+0.310
Jamaica	5	2	3	0	0	0	8	–0.784
Guyana	5	2	3	0	0	0	8	–1.199
Leeward Islands	5	0	4	0	1	0	2	–2.109

Source: Windies Cricket

== Fixtures ==
Source: Windies Cricket

8 May 2023
Scorecard

Guyana; 79 (27.1 overs)	v	Windward Islands; 80/1 (21.2 overs)
Realeanna Grimmond 20 (39); Qiana Joseph 4/18 (10 overs)		Afy Fletcher 44* (52); Plaffiana Millington 1/24 (6 overs)

Windward Islands won by 9 wickets
Conaree Sports Club, Basseterre, Saint Kitts

8 May 2023
Scorecard

Leeward Islands; 120 (28.4 overs)	v	Jamaica; 121/4 (24.1 overs)
Terez Parker 32 (44); Celina Whyte 5/31 (8.4 overs)		Natasha McLean 33* (29); Amanda Edwards 2/17 (5 overs)

Jamaica won by 6 wickets
St. Paul's Sports Complex, Basseterre, Saint Kitts

8 May 2023
Scorecard

Trinidad and Tobago; 161 (43.5 overs)	v	Barbados; 162/4 (38.3 overs)
Shunelle Sawh 68 (113); Allison Gordon 4/36 (10 overs)		Aaliyah Alleyne 48* (51); Steffi Soogrim 2/36 (9 overs)

Barbados won by 6 wickets
Warner Park Sporting Complex, Basseterre, Saint Kitts

10 May 2023
Scorecard

Jamaica; 123 (39.4 overs)	v	Trinidad and Tobago; 127/9 (42 overs)
Natasha McLean 59* (60); Samara Ramnath 5/13 (7.4 overs)		Britney Cooper 52 (57); Vanessa Watts 3/16 (10 overs)

Trinidad and Tobago won by 1 wicket
St. Paul's Sports Complex, Basseterre, Saint Kitts

10 May 2023
Scorecard

Guyana; 121 (34.3 overs)	v	Barbados; 122/1 (17.1 overs)
Sheneta Grimmond 24 (30); Shakera Selman 2/16 (5 overs)		Hayley Matthews 72* (42); Sheneta Grimmond 1/22 (3.1 overs)

Barbados won by 9 wickets
Conaree Sports Club, Basseterre, Saint Kitts

10 May 2023
Scorecard

Leeward Islands; 59 (19 overs)	v	Windward Islands; 63/2 (15.1 overs)
Divya Saxena 44* (44); Qiana Joseph 5/14 (5 overs)		Malika Edward 31 (53); Davronique Maynard 1/5 (1 over)

Windward Islands won by 8 wickets
Warner Park Sporting Complex, Basseterre, Saint Kitts

12 May 2023
Socrecard

Windward Islands; 150 (44.3 overs)	v	Trinidad and Tobago; 152/8 (38.3 overs)
Afy Fletcher 50 (71); Karishma Ramharack 3/24 (9.3 overs)		Reniece Boyce 53 (47); Qiana Joseph 6/20 (10 overs)

Trinidad and Tobago won by 2 wickets
St. Paul's Sports Complex, Basseterre, Saint Kitts

12 May 2023
Scorecard

Barbados; 318/8 (50 overs)	v	Jamaica; 113 (28.4 overs)
Kyshona Knight 144 (119); Neisha-Ann Waisome 3/65 (10 overs)		Chedean Nation 32 (49); Keila Elliott 4/19 (5.4 overs)

Barbados won by 205 runs
Conaree Sports Club, Basseterre, Saint Kitts

12 May 2023
Scorecard

Guyana; 167/9 (5 overs)	v	Leeward Islands; 166/9 (50 overs)
Shabika Gajnabi 49 (61); Tanya Martin 4/36 (10 overs)		Amanda Edwards 74 (124); Sheneta Grimmond 3/26 (10 overs)

Guyana won by 1 run
Warner Park Sporting Complex, Basseterre, Saint Kitts

15 May 2023
Scorecard

Jamaica; 94 (40.3 overs)	v	Guyana; 67/7 (22.4 overs)
Natasha McLean 31 (39); Plaffiana Millington 3/21 (10 overs)		Mandy Mangru 19 (52); Celina Whyte 3/14 (6 overs)

Guyana won by 4 wickets (DLS)
Warner Park Sporting Complex, Basseterre, Saint Kitts

- Guyana innings reduced to 28 overs due to rain; target was 67.

15 May 2023
Scorecard

Trinidad and Tobago; 253/6 (50 overs)	v	Leeward Islands
Djenaba Joseph 90 (131); Tynetta McKay 1/7 (1 over)

No Result
Conaree Sports Club, Basseterre, Saint Kitts

- No further play possible due to rain.

15 May 2023
Scorecard

Barbados; 228/6 (50 overs)	v	Windward Islands; 155 (32.2 overs)
Hayley Matthews 64 (74); Zaida James 2/38 (10 overs)		Afy Fletcher 43 (36); Hayley Matthews 6/28 (10 overs)

Barbados won by 73 runs
St. Paul's Sports Complex, Basseterre, Saint Kitts

17 May 2023
Scorecard

Leeward Islands; 74 (27.2 overs)	v	Barbados; 75/3 (12 overs)
Terez Parker 12 (34); Shakera Selman 3/9 (5 overs)		Aaliyah Alleyne 21* (8); Kimberley Anthony 2/20 (4 overs)

Barbados won by 7 wickets
Warner Park Sporting Complex, Basseterre, Saint Kitts

17 May 2023
Scorecard

Trinidad and Tobago; 132/8 (50 overs)	v	Guyana; 56 (35.4 overs)
Anisa Mohammed 54* (118); Shabika Gajnabi 3/17 (10 overs)		Plaffiana Millington 15 (51); Steffi Soogrim 6/14 (10 overs)

Trinidad and Tobago won by 77 runs
St. Paul's Sports Complex, Basseterre, Saint Kitts

17 May 2023
Scorecard

Jamaica; 105 (38.2 overs)	v	Windward Islands; 97 (22.5 overs)
Jody-Ann Brown 23 (60); Afy Fletcher 6/29 (10 overs)		Malika Edward 35 (39); Vanessa Watts 4/20 (6 overs)

Jamaica won by 8 runs
Warner Park Sporting Complex, Basseterre, Saint Kitts

== Statistics ==
=== Most runs ===
Player	Team	Matches	Innings	Runs	Average	HS	100s	50s
Kyshona Knight	Barbados	5	4	240	80.00	144	1	1
Hayley Matthews	Barbados	5	4	177	59.00	72*	0	2
Natasha McLean	Jamaica	5	5	159	53.00	59*	0	1
Afy Fletcher	Windward Islands	5	5	149	49.66	50	0	1
Aaliyah Alleyne	Barbados	5	4	134	67.00	48*	0	0

Source: Windies Cricket

=== Most wickets ===
Player	Team	Overs	Wickets	Average	BBI	5w
Qiana Joseph	Windward Islands	45.0	16	6.43	6/20	2
Keila Elliott	Barbados	35.1	13	10.46	4/19	0
Celina Whyte	Jamaica	33.4	12	10.33	5/31	1
Vanessa Watts	Jamaica	40.0	12	10.66	4/20	0
Afy Fletcher	Windward Islands	39.1	12	10.41	6/29	1

Source: Windies Cricket
