= 2023 Twenty20 Blaze =

Cricket tournament

- Dates: 20 – 27 May 2023
- Administrator: Cricket West Indies
- Cricket format: Twenty20
- Tournament format: Round-robin
- Champions: Barbados (3rd title)
- Participants: 6
- Matches: 15
- Most runs: Kycia Knight (165)
- Most wickets: Afy Fletcher (10)

The 2023 Twenty20 Blaze was the seventh season of the women's Twenty20 cricket competition played in the West Indies. It took place from 20 to 27 May 2023, with six teams taking part and all matches taking place in Basseterre. The tournament followed the 2023 Women's Super50 Cup.

Barbados won the tournament, their third Twenty20 title.

== Competition format ==
Teams played in a round-robin in a group of six, therefore playing 5 matches overall. Matches were played using a Twenty20 format. The top team in the group was crowned the Champions.

The group worked on a points system with positions being based on the total points. Points were awarded as follows:

Win: 4 points
Loss: 0 points.
Abandoned/No Result: 2 points.

In case of a tie in the standings, teams were separated by head-to-head record.

== Points table ==
Team	Pld	W	L	T	NR	A	Pts	NRR
Barbados (C)	5	4	1	0	0	0	16	–0.046
Guyana	5	4	1	0	0	0	16	+0.244
Windward Islands	5	3	2	0	0	0	12	+0.800
Jamaica	5	2	3	0	0	0	8	+0.022
Trinidad and Tobago	5	2	3	0	0	0	8	+0.218
Leeward Islands	5	0	5	0	0	0	0	–1.467

Source: Windies Cricket

== Fixtures ==
Source: Windies Cricket

20 May 2023
Scorecard

Guyana; 88/7 (20 overs)	v	Windward Islands; 84/8 (20 overs)
Katana Mentore 32 (33); Afy Fletcher 4/10 (4 overs)		Qiana Joseph 19 (29); Ashmini Munisar 1/7 (4 overs)

Guyana won by 4 runs
Warner Park Sporting Complex, Basseterre, Saint Kitts

20 May 2023
Scorecard

Leeward Islands; 68/7 (20 overs)	v	Jamaica; 70/2 (11.5 overs)
Terez Parker 22* (43); Celina Whyte 2/7 (4 overs)		Rashada Williams 36* (29); Divya Saxena 1/12 (1 over)

Jamaica won by 8 wickets
Warner Park Sporting Complex, Basseterre, Saint Kitts

20 May 2023
Scorecard

Barbados; 80/6 (20 overs)	v	Trinidad and Tobago; 82/5 (12.3 overs)
Shakera Selman 29* (41); Lee-Ann Kirby 3/10 (4 overs)		Lee-Ann Kirby 25* (33); Keila Elliott 2/16 (2.3 overs)

Trinidad and Tobago won by 5 wickets
Warner Park Sporting Complex, Basseterre, Saint Kitts

21 May 2023
Scorecard

Windward Islands; 127/4 (20 overs)	v	Leeward Islands; 82/6 (20 overs)
Jannillea Glasgow 37 (49); Divya Saxena 1/15 (2 overs)		Amanda Edwards 39* (61); Zaida James 2/21 (4 overs)

Windward Islands won by 45 runs
Warner Park Sporting Complex, Basseterre, Saint Kitts

21 May 2023
Scorecard

Guyana; 91/3 (20 overs)	v	Barbados; 92/7 (19.5 overs)
Cherry-Ann Fraser 35* (51); Allison Gordon 1/8 (3 overs)		Shakera Selman 17* (20); Kaysia Schultz 3/13 (4 overs)

Barbados won by 3 wickets
Warner Park Sporting Complex, Basseterre, Saint Kitts

21 May 2023
Scorecard

Jamaica; 115/9 (20 overs)	v	Trinidad and Tobago; 109/9 (20 overs)
Rashada Williams 32 (32); Anisa Mohammed 3/19 (4 overs)		Britney Cooper 29 (32); Neisha-Ann Waisome 3/16 (4 overs)

Jamaica won by 6 runs
Warner Park Sporting Complex, Basseterre, Saint Kitts

23 May 2023
Scorecard

Trinidad and Tobago; 59 (17.4 overs)	v	Windward Islands; 62/3 (16.2 overs)
Reniece Boyce 12 (22); Carena Noel 2/11 (4 overs)		Qiana Joseph 18* (15); Samara Ramnath 3/12 (4 overs)

Windward Islands won by 7 wickets
Warner Park Sporting Complex, Basseterre, Saint Kitts

23 May 2023
Scorecard

Jamaica; 98/4 (20 overs)	v	Barbados; 102/1 (16.5 overs)
Stafanie Taylor 34* (43); Keila Elliott 2/9 (3 overs)		Aaliyah Alleyne 55* (55); Chedean Nation 1/20 (3 overs)

Barbados won by 9 wickets
Warner Park Sporting Complex, Basseterre, Saint Kitts

23 May 2023
Scorecard

Leeward Islands; 93/6 (20 overs)	v	Guyana; 94/5 (17.4 overs)
Divya Saxena 31 (43); Plaffiana Millington 3/21 (4 overs)		Sheneta Grimmond 26 (29); Jahzara Claxton 1/10 (2 overs)

Guyana won by 5 wickets
Warner Park Sporting Complex, Basseterre, Saint Kitts

25 May 2023
Scorecard

Jamaica; 109/6 (20 overs)	v	Guyana; 110/2 (18 overs)
Stafanie Taylor 48 (49); Cherry-Ann Fraser 3/18 (3 overs)		Shemaine Campbelle 50* (49); Celina Whyte 2/11 (4 overs)

Guyana won by 8 wickets
Warner Park Sporting Complex, Basseterre, Saint Kitts

25 May 2023
Scorecard

Leeward Islands; 120/5 (20 overs)	v	Trinidad and Tobago; 121/4 (17.4 overs)
Divya Saxena 37 (36); Kirbyina Alexander 2/15 (3 overs)		Shunelle Sawh 26 (21); Amanda Edwards 1/13 (3.4 overs)

Trinidad and Tobago won by 6 wickets
Warner Park Sporting Complex, Basseterre, Saint Kitts

25 May 2023
Scorecard

Windward Islands; 128/8 (20 overs)	v	Barbados; 129/6 (20 overs)
Qiana Joseph 50 (50); Shamilia Connell 3/16 (4 overs)		Kycia Knight 49 (49); Zaida James 2/27 (4 overs)

Barbados won by 4 wickets
Warner Park Sporting Complex, Basseterre, Saint Kitts

27 May 2023
Scorecard

Leeward Islands; 121/5 (20 overs)	v	Barbados; 122/2 (17.3 overs)
Divya Saxena 33* (50); Theanny Herbert-Mayers 2/12 (4 overs)		Kycia Knight 63* (51); Amanda Edwards 2/12 (4 overs)

Barbados won by 8 wickets
Warner Park Sporting Complex, Basseterre, Saint Kitts

27 May 2023
Scorecard

Guyana; 39 (19.3 overs)	v	Trinidad and Tobago; 38 (18.4 overs)
Shemaine Campbelle 13 (18); Anisa Mohammed 4/5 (4 overs)		Djenaba Joseph 9 (35); Mandy Mangru 4/11 (3.4 overs)

Guyana won by 1 run
St. Paul's Sports Complex, Basseterre, Saint Kitts

27 May 2023
Scorecard

Jamaica; 102/6 (20 overs)	v	Windward Islands; 103/4 (17 overs)
Keneshia Ferron 32 (41); Afy Fletcher 2/11 (4 overs)		Zaida James 28 (42); Rashada Williams 1/8 (3 overs)

Windward Islands won by 6 wickets
Conaree Cricket Centre, Basseterre, Saint Kitts

== Statistics ==
=== Most runs ===
Player	Team	Matches	Innings	Runs	Average	HS	100s	50s
Kycia Knight	Barbados	5	5	165	41.25	63*	0	1
Qiana Joseph	Windward Islands	5	5	112	37.33	50	0	1
Stafanie Taylor	Jamaica	4	4	110	36.66	48	0	0
Divya Saxena	Leeward Islands	5	5	109	27.25	37	0	0
Amanda Edwards	Leeward Islands	5	5	104	26.00	39*	0	0

Source: Windies Cricket

=== Most wickets ===
Player	Team	Overs	Wickets	Average	BBI	5w
Afy Fletcher	Windward Islands	19.0	10	6.40	4/10	0
Anisa Mohammed	Trinidad and Tobago	20.0	9	7.55	4/5	0
Shamilia Connell	Barbados	20.0	7	15.71	3/16	0
Ashmini Munisar	Guyana	19.0	6	10.50	2/8	0
Celina Whyte	Jamaica	19.0	6	12.16	2/7	0

Source: Windies Cricket
