= South Africa women's cricket team in the West Indies in 2021 =

International cricket tour

	West Indies women	South Africa women
- Dates: 31 August – 19 September 2021
Captains	Anisa Mohammed (Note: Deandra Dottin captained the West Indies Women for the fifth WODI.)	Dane van Niekerk

One Day International series
- Results: South Africa women won the 5-match series 4–1
Most runs	Rashada Williams (157)	Lizelle Lee (248)
Most wickets	Qiana Joseph (5)	Dane van Niekerk (8)

Twenty20 International series
- Results: 3-match series drawn 1–1
Most runs	Deandra Dottin (54)	Lizelle Lee (114)
Most wickets	Hayley Matthews (4)	Marizanne Kapp (4)
- Player of the series: Lizelle Lee (SA)

The South Africa women's cricket team played the West Indies women's cricket team in August and September 2021. The tour consisted of five Women's One Day Internationals (WODIs) and three Women's Twenty20 Internationals (WT20Is). The WODI matches were used as the West Indies' preparation for the 2021 Women's Cricket World Cup Qualifier tournament.

The first WT20I match ended as a no result due to rain. South Africa then won the second WT20I match by 50 runs, with the West Indies winning the third match by five wickets, with the series being drawn 1–1. In the first two WODI matches, South Africa recorded big wins, of eight and nine wickets respectively, taking a 2–0 lead in the series. South Africa won the third WODI by eight wickets to win the series with two matches to play. South Africa also won the fourth WODI to take a 4–0 lead in the series. The final match ended in a tie, with the West Indies winning the Super Over. Therefore, South Africa won the five-match series 4–1.

== Squads ==
West Indies		South Africa
WODIs	WT20Is	WODIs and WT20Is
Anisa Mohammed (c); Deandra Dottin (vc); Aaliyah Alleyne; Reniece Boyce; Britney Cooper; Shamilia Connell; Cherry-Ann Fraser; Shabika Gajnabi; Sheneta Grimmond; Chinelle Henry; Qiana Joseph; Kycia Knight; Kyshona Knight; Hayley Matthews; Chedean Nation; Karishma Ramharack; Shakera Selman; Rashada Williams	Anisa Mohammed (c); Deandra Dottin (vc); Aaliyah Alleyne; Shamilia Connell; Britney Cooper; Cherry-Ann Fraser; Shabika Gajnabi; Chinelle Henry; Qiana Joseph; Kycia Knight; Kyshona Knight; Hayley Matthews; Chedean Nation; Karishma Ramharack; Shakera Selman	Dane van Niekerk (c); Tazmin Brits; Trisha Chetty; Nadine de Klerk; Mignon du Preez; Lara Goodall; Shabnim Ismail; Sinalo Jafta; Marizanne Kapp; Ayabonga Khaka; Masabata Klaas; Lizelle Lee; Suné Luus; Nonkululeko Mlaba; Tumi Sekhukhune; Nondumiso Shangase; Chloe Tryon; Laura Wolvaardt

South Africa did not name individual squads for the WODI and WT20I matches, opting instead to name a combined squad of 18 players for the tour. Cricket West Indies (CWI) named Anisa Mohammed as the captain for the WT20I matches, after Stafanie Taylor was ruled out due to being a close contact of someone with COVID-19. For the third WT20I match, CWI announced that Cherry-Ann Fraser and Karishma Ramharack had been added to the squad, replacing Shamilia Connell and Shakera Selman. CWI also named Anisa Mohammed as the WODI captain, after Stafanie Taylor was unavailable after returning home. The West Indies added Shakera Selman and Rashada Williams to their WODI squad ahead of the third match, and Britney Cooper was ruled out of the rest of the series due to a medical reason. Reniece Boyce, Cherry-Ann Fraser and Sheneta Grimmond were added to the West Indies' squad for the fourth WODI, with Qiana Joseph, Chedean Nation, and Karishma Ramharack all being rested. Deandra Dottin captained the West Indies for the fifth WODI, after Anisa Mohammed was ruled out of the match with a fractured finger.

== WT20I series ==
=== 1st WT20I ===
31 August 2021
14:00
Scorecard

South Africa; 135/3 (20 overs)	v	West Indies; 21/1 (2.5 overs)
Marizanne Kapp 36 (43); Anisa Mohammed 1/23 (4 overs)		Hayley Matthews 8 (8); Marizanne Kapp 1/15 (1.5 overs)

No result
Sir Vivian Richards Stadium, Antigua
Umpires: Danesh Ramdhanie (WI) and Jacqueline Williams (WI)

- South Africa Women won the toss and elected to bat.
- Rain during the West Indies' innings prevented any further play.
- Qiana Joseph (WI) made her WT20I debut.

=== 2nd WT20I ===
2 September 2021
14:00
Scorecard

South Africa; 165/3 (20 overs)	v	West Indies; 115/8 (20 overs)
Lizelle Lee 75 (52); Hayley Matthews 2/43 (3 overs)		Britney Cooper 26 (15); Marizanne Kapp 3/31 (4 overs)

South Africa Women won by 50 runs
Sir Vivian Richards Stadium, Antigua
Umpires: Jonathan Blades (WI) and Danesh Ramdhanie (WI)
Player of the match: Lizelle Lee (SA)

- West Indies Women won the toss and elected to field.

=== 3rd WT20I ===
4 September 2021
14:00
Scorecard

South Africa; 80/9 (19 overs)	v	West Indies; 81/5 (11.5 overs)
Suné Luus 23 (37); Karishma Ramharack 3/8 (3 overs)		Deandra Dottin 31 (21); Dane van Niekerk 2/8 (2.5 overs)

West Indies Women won by 5 wickets
Sir Vivian Richards Stadium, Antigua
Umpires: Jacqueline Williams (WI) and Joel Wilson (WI)
Player of the match: Karishma Ramharack (WI)

- South Africa Women won the toss and elected to bat.

== WODI series ==
=== 1st WODI ===
7 September 2021
14:45 (D/N)
Scorecard

West Indies; 153 (46.4 overs)	v	South Africa; 157/2 (39.3 overs)
Kycia Knight 39 (78); Ayabonga Khaka 2/17 (7.4 overs)		Lizelle Lee 91* (127); Qiana Joseph 1/26 (8 overs)

South Africa women won by 8 wickets
Coolidge Cricket Ground, Antigua
Umpires: Danesh Ramdhanie (WI) and Joel Wilson (WI)
Player of the match: Lizelle Lee (SA)

- West Indies Women won the toss and elected to bat.

=== 2nd WODI ===
10 September 2021
10:00
Scorecard

West Indies; 120 (44.2 overs)	v	South Africa; 121/1 (25.4 overs)
Kycia Knight 22 (37); Marizanne Kapp 3/24 (9 overs)		Laura Wolvaardt 71* (84); Hayley Matthews 1/13 (4 overs)

South Africa Women won by 9 wickets
Coolidge Cricket Ground, Antigua
Umpires: Danesh Ramdhanie (WI) and Joel Wilson (WI)
Player of the match: Laura Wolvaardt (SA)

- West Indies Women won the toss and elected to bat.

=== 3rd WODI ===
13 September 2021
10:00
Scorecard

West Indies; 157 (48.4 overs)	v	South Africa; 158/2 (36.4 overs)
Deandra Dottin 71 (123); Shabnim Ismail 3/31 (10 overs)		Lizelle Lee 78* (120); Qiana Joseph 2/24 (7.4 overs)

South Africa women won by 8 wickets
Coolidge Cricket Ground, Antigua
Umpires: Jonathan Blades (WI) and Jacqueline Williams (WI)
Player of the match: Shabnim Ismail (SA)

- South Africa Women won the toss and elected to field.
- Deandra Dottin (WI) scored her 3,000th run in WODIs.

=== 4th WODI ===
16 September 2021
10:00
Scorecard

South Africa; 186/6 (50 overs)	v	West Indies; 150/9 (50 overs)
Mignon du Preez 65* (91); Anisa Mohammed 2/26 (10 overs)		Rashada Williams 42 (90); Dane van Niekerk 3/23 (8 overs)

South Africa Women won by 35 runs
Sir Vivian Richards Stadium, Antigua
Umpires: Jonathan Blades (WI) and Jacqueline Williams (WI)
Player of the match: Dane van Niekerk (SA)

- West Indies Women won the toss and elected to field.
- Cherry-Ann Fraser (WI) made her WODI debut.

=== 5th WODI ===
19 September 2021
10:00
Scorecard

West Indies; 192/5 (50 overs)	v	South Africa; 192/7 (50 overs)
Rashada Williams 78* (138); Nadine de Klerk 3/33 (10 overs)		Lizelle Lee 61 (78); Sheneta Grimmond 4/33 (10 overs)

Match tied
(West Indies Women won the Super Over)
Sir Vivian Richards Stadium, Antigua
Umpires: Jacqueline Williams (WI) and Joel Wilson (WI)
Player of the match: Sheneta Grimmond (WI)

- West Indies Women won the toss and elected to bat.
- First WODI to go to a Super Over.
