= 2026 Ireland Women's Tri-Nation Series =

- Date: 28 May - 4 June 2026
- Location: Ireland
- Result: West Indies won the series
- Player of the series: (Ireland) Ava Canning
Teams
| Ireland | Pakistan | West Indies |
Captains
| Orla Prendergast | Fatima Sana | Hayley Matthews |
Most runs
| Orla Prendergast (129) | Saira Jabeen (73) | Hayley Matthews (123) |
Most wickets
| Ava Canning (6) | Rameen Shamim (3) | Qiana Joseph (5) |

The 2026 Ireland Women's Tri-Nation Series was an international cricket series which took place in Ireland from 28 May to 4 June 2026. It was a tri-nation series contested by the women's national teams of Ireland, Pakistan and the West Indies. All matches were played at the Castle Avenue Cricket Ground in Clontarf. This tournament served as preparation for all three teams ahead of the 2026 Women's T20 World Cup.

== Squads ==
| Ireland | Pakistan | West Indies |
|---|---|---|
| Orla Prendergast (c); Ava Canning; Christina Coulter Reilly; Alana Dalzell; ~~Laura Delany~~; Georgina Dempsey; Amy Hunter (wk); Arlene Kelly; Louise Little; Aimee Maguire; Lara McBride; Cara Murray; Leah Paul; Rebecca Stokell; Alice Tector | Fatima Sana (c); Muneeba Ali (wk); Diana Baig; Eyman Fatima; Gull Feroza; Tuba Hassan; Sadia Iqbal; Saira Jabeen; Iram Javed; Natalia Pervaiz; Aliya Riaz; Tasmia Rubab; Nashra Sandhu; Rameen Shamim; Ayesha Zafar | Hayley Matthews (c); Chinelle Henry (vc); Aaliyah Alleyne; Shemaine Campbelle (wk); Jahzara Claxton; Deandra Dottin; Afy Fletcher; Jannillea Glasgow; Shawnisha Hector; Zaida James; Qiana Joseph; Mandy Mangru; Ashmini Munisar; Karishma Ramharack; Stafanie Taylor |

On 27 May, Laura Delany was ruled out of the series and was replaced by Alice Tector.

== Points table ==
| Pos | Team | Pld | W | L | NR | Pts | NRR |
|---|---|---|---|---|---|---|---|
| 1 | West Indies | 4 | 2 | 1 | 1 | 10 | 1.839 |
| 2 | Ireland | 4 | 2 | 1 | 1 | 10 | −1.171 |
| 3 | Pakistan | 4 | 0 | 2 | 2 | 4 | −0.850 |

Source: Cricinfo

== Fixtures ==
28 May 2026
16:00
Scorecard

| Ireland; 103 (17 overs) | v | West Indies; 104/2 (11.3 overs) |
| Orla Prendergast 25 (22); Qiana Joseph 3/8 (2 overs) | | Hayley Matthews 82* (44); Ava Canning 2/16 (4 overs) |

West Indies won by 8 wickets
Castle Avenue, Clontarf
Umpires: Gareth Morrison (Ire) and Jonathan Kennedy (Ire)
Player of the match: Hayley Matthews (WI)

- West Indies won the toss and elected to field.
- Alice Tector (Ire) made her T20I debut.

29 May 2026
16:00
Scorecard

| West Indies; 199/6 (20 overs) | v | Pakistan; 174/8 (20 overs) |
| Jannillea Glasgow 42 (25); Rameen Shamim 2/27 (4 overs) | | Aliya Riaz 37 (28); Chinelle Henry 2/13 (2 overs) |

West Indies won by 25 runs
Castle Avenue, Clontarf
Umpires: George Brolly (Ire) and Gareth Morrison (Ire)
Player of the match: Chinelle Henry (WI)

- West Indies won the toss and elected to bat.

31 May 2026
16:00
Scorecard

| Pakistan; 176/6 (20 overs) | v | Ireland; 177/3 (19.1 overs) |
| Muneeba Ali 65 (41); Ava Canning 2/35 (4 overs) | | Rebecca Stokell 60* (42); Ayesha Zafar 2/24 (3 overs) |

Ireland won by 7 wickets
Castle Avenue, Clontarf
Umpires: George Brolly (Ire) and Jonathan Kennedy (Ire)
Player of the match: Rebecca Stokell (Ire)

- Pakistan won the toss and elected to bat.

1 June 2026
16:00
Scorecard

| West Indies; 141/8 (20 overs) | v | Ireland; 99/5 (14.1 overs) |
| Jannillea Glasgow 36 (26); Ava Canning 2/11 (4 overs) | | Orla Prendergast 71* (46); Shawnisha Hector 2/21 (2 overs) |

Ireland won by 1 run (DLS method)
Castle Avenue, Clontarf
Umpires: Azam Baig (Ire) and Gareth Morrison (Ire)
Player of the match: Orla Prendergast (Ire)

- West Indies won the toss and elected to bat.
- No further play was possible due to rain.

3 June 2026
16:00
Scorecard

| Pakistan; 111/7 (16.5 overs) | v | West Indies |
| Aliya Riaz 24 (23); Chinelle Henry 2/13 (2 overs) |

No result
Castle Avenue, Clontarf
Umpires: Azam Baig (Ire) and Jonathan Kennedy (Ire)

- West Indies won the toss and elected to field.
- No further play was possible due to rain.

4 June 2026
16:00
Scorecard

| Ireland | v | Pakistan |

Match abandoned
Castle Avenue, Clontarf
Umpires: Gareth Morrison (Ire) and Jonathan Kennedy (Ire)

- No toss.
- No play was possible due to rain.
