= West Indies women's cricket team in England in 2020 =

International cricket tour

	England women	West Indies women
- Dates: 21 – 30 September 2020
Captains	Heather Knight	Stafanie Taylor

Twenty20 International series
- Results: England women won the 5-match series 5–0
Most runs	Tammy Beaumont (120)	Deandra Dottin (185)
Most wickets	Sarah Glenn (7)	Shamilia Connell (7)
- Player of the series: Sarah Glenn (Eng)

The West Indies women's cricket team toured England to play the England women's cricket team in September 2020. The tour consisted of five Women's Twenty20 International (WT20I) matches. The England and Wales Cricket Board (ECB) confirmed the fixtures, after the planned tour by the South African women's team was cancelled due to the COVID-19 pandemic. All of the matches were played behind closed doors at the County Cricket Ground in Derby.

The last time the two teams played a match was against each other in the 2020 ICC Women's T20 World Cup on 1 March 2020. England won the match by 46 runs. The tour was the first women's bilateral series to use the Decision Review System (DRS) in all the matches. The third match of the series, on 26 September 2020, was shown free-to-air on the BBC. It was the first time a women's cricket match was shown live on the BBC in the United Kingdom since the 1993 Women's Cricket World Cup.

On 26 August 2020, Cricket West Indies named their squad for the tour. The West Indies team left Antigua on 30 August 2020, and arrived in England the following day. England won the first two matches by the same margin of 47 runs. They then won the third match by 20 runs, to take an unassailable lead in the series. England won the final two matches to take the series 5–0, the first time the England Women's cricket team had won a bilateral series 5–0.

== Squads ==
WT20Is
England	West Indies
Heather Knight (c); Tammy Beaumont; Katherine Brunt; Kate Cross; Freya Davies; Sophia Dunkley; Sophie Ecclestone; Katie George; Sarah Glenn; Amy Jones (wk); Nat Sciver; Anya Shrubsole; Mady Villiers; Fran Wilson; Lauren Winfield-Hill; Danni Wyatt	Stafanie Taylor (c); Aaliyah Alleyne; Shemaine Campbelle; Britney Cooper; Shamilia Connell; Deandra Dottin; Afy Fletcher; Cherry-Ann Fraser; Shabika Gajnabi; Sheneta Grimmond; Chinelle Henry; Lee-Ann Kirby; Hayley Matthews; Natasha McLean; Chedean Nation; Karishma Ramharack; Kaysia Schultz; Shakera Selman

Bryony Smith and Linsey Smith were named as standby players for the England team.

== WT20I series ==
=== 1st WT20I ===
21 September 2020
18:00 (N)
Scorecard

England; 163/8 (20 overs)	v	West Indies; 116/6 (20 overs)
Tammy Beaumont 62 (49); Shakera Selman 3/26 (4 overs)		Deandra Dottin 69 (59); Nat Sciver 2/16 (4 overs)

England Women won by 47 runs
County Cricket Ground, Derby
Umpires: Mike Burns (Eng) and Sue Redfern (Eng)
Player of the match: Tammy Beaumont (Eng)

- England Women won the toss and elected to bat.
- Amy Jones (Eng) played in her 50th WT20I.

=== 2nd WT20I ===
23 September 2020
18:00 (N)
Scorecard

England; 151/8 (20 overs)	v	West Indies; 104/8 (20 overs)
Sarah Glenn 26 (19); Stafanie Taylor 2/12 (4 overs)		Deandra Dottin 38 (40); Mady Villiers 2/10 (3 overs)

England Women won by 47 runs
County Cricket Ground, Derby
Umpires: Graham Lloyd (Eng) and David Millns (Eng)
Player of the match: Sarah Glenn (Eng)

- West Indies Women won the toss and elected to field.
- Stafanie Taylor (WI) became the second cricketer to score 3,000 runs in WT20Is.

=== 3rd WT20I ===
26 September 2020
13:00
Scorecard

England; 154/6 (20 overs)	v	West Indies; 134/5 (20 overs)
Nat Sciver 82 (61); Shamilia Connell 2/13 (3 overs)		Deandra Dottin 63 (56); Sarah Glenn 2/18 (4 overs)

England Women won by 20 runs
County Cricket Ground, Derby
Umpires: David Millns (Eng) and Sue Redfern (Eng)
Player of the match: Nat Sciver (Eng)

- England Women won the toss and elected to bat.
- Hayley Matthews (WI) took her 50th wicket in WT20Is.

=== 4th WT20I ===
28 September 2020
18:00 (N)
Scorecard

England; 166/6 (20 overs)	v	West Indies; 122/9 (20 overs)
Amy Jones 55 (37); Aaliyah Alleyne 2/25 (4 overs)		Chedean Nation 30 (25); Sarah Glenn 2/15 (3 overs)

England Women won by 44 runs
County Cricket Ground, Derby
Umpires: Graham Lloyd (Eng) and Mike Burns (Eng)
Player of the match: Amy Jones (Eng)

- England Women won the toss and elected to bat.

=== 5th WT20I ===
30 September 2020
18:00 (N)
Scorecard

West Indies; 41/3 (5 overs)	v	England; 42/7 (4.3 overs)
Stafanie Taylor 15* (10); Freya Davies 1/11 (1 over)		Tammy Beaumont 9 (5); Shamilia Connell 3/14 (2 overs)

England Women won by 3 wickets
County Cricket Ground, Derby
Umpires: Graham Lloyd (Eng) and Sue Redfern (Eng)
Player of the match: Shamilia Connell (WI)

- England Women won the toss and elected to field.
- The match was reduced to 5 overs per side due to rain.
- Cherry-Ann Fraser (WI) made her WT20I debut.
- Deandra Dottin (WI) became the first cricketer to hit 100 sixes in WT20Is.
