= England women's cricket team in the West Indies in 2022–23 =

International cricket tour

	West Indies	England
- Dates: 4 – 22 December 2022
Captains	Hayley Matthews	Heather Knight (Note: Amy Jones captained England in the third ODI.)

One Day International series
- Results: England won the 3-match series 3–0
Most runs	Rashada Williams (88)	Nat Sciver (180)
Most wickets	Hayley Matthews (6)	Charlie Dean (7)
- Player of the series: Nat Sciver (Eng)

Twenty20 International series
- Results: England won the 5-match series 5–0
Most runs	Hayley Matthews (74)	Sophia Dunkley (154)
Most wickets	Hayley Matthews (6)	Charlie Dean (11)
- Player of the series: Charlie Dean (Eng)

The England women's cricket team toured the West Indies in December 2022 to play three Women's One Day Internationals (WODIs) and five Women's Twenty20 Internationals (WT20Is). The WODI matches formed part of the 2022–2025 ICC Women's Championship.

England won the first ODI by 142 runs, helped by an innings of 90 runs from Nat Sciver and a four-wicket haul from Charlie Dean. The second ODI saw England win by the same margin, with Lauren Bell taking four wickets. England completed a 3–0 series sweep after beating the hosts by 151 runs in the final ODI.

England began the T20I series with a comfortable win, successfully chasing down the West Indies score of 105/7 inside 13 overs. No West Indian batters scored more than 18 in the second match, which was again won by the tourists. England sealed the series with a 17-run victory in the third match. The fourth match was also won by England, this time by a comfortable margin of 49 runs. West Indies were bowled out for only 43 runs in the fifth and final T20I, which was their lowest total in the format. England won the match by 8 wickets to confirm a 5–0 series victory.

== Squads ==
WODIs		WT20Is	
West Indies	England	West Indies	England
Hayley Matthews (c); Shakera Selman (vc); Aaliyah Alleyne; Shemaine Campbelle (wk); Afy Fletcher; Cherry-Ann Fraser; Shabika Gajnabi; Sheneta Grimmond; Chinelle Henry; Kycia Knight (wk); Kyshona Knight; Chedean Nation; ~~Karishma Ramharack~~; Kaysia Schultz; Rashada Williams (wk)	Heather Knight (c, wk); Amy Jones (vc, wk); Tammy Beaumont (wk); Lauren Bell; Alice Capsey; Kate Cross; Alice Davidson-Richards; Freya Davies; Charlie Dean; Sophia Dunkley; Sophie Ecclestone; Freya Kemp; Emma Lamb; Nat Sciver; Danni Wyatt	Hayley Matthews (c); Shemaine Campbelle (vc); Aaliyah Alleyne; Afy Fletcher; Cherry-Ann Fraser; Shabika Gajnabi; Sheneta Grimmond; Chinelle Henry; Trishan Holder; Djenaba Joseph; Kycia Knight (wk); Kyshona Knight; Karishma Ramharack; Kaysia Schultz; Rashada Williams (wk)	Heather Knight (c, wk); Amy Jones (vc, wk); Lauren Bell; Maia Bouchier; Katherine Brunt; ~~Alice Capsey~~; Alice Davidson-Richards; Freya Davies; Charlie Dean; Sophia Dunkley; Sophie Ecclestone; Sarah Glenn; ~~Freya Kemp~~; Nat Sciver; Lauren Winfield-Hill; Issy Wong; Danni Wyatt

Alice Capsey was ruled out of the remainder of the tour after sustaining a broken collarbone during the first ODI. Maia Bouchier and Alice Davidson-Richards were added to England's T20I squad as a result. Kyshona Knight replaced the injured Karishma Ramharack in the West Indies' squad for the 3rd ODI. Before the start of the T20I series, Freya Kemp was ruled out of England's squad because of a back injury. It was later announced that Kemp had been diagnoses with a stress fracture in her back, that also ruled her out of the 2023 ICC Women's T20 World Cup. Kyshona Knight replaced the injured Chinelle Henry in West Indies' squad for the final T20I.

== WODI series ==
=== 1st WODI ===
4 December 2022
14:00 (D/N)
Scorecard

England; 307/7 (50 overs)	v	West Indies; 165 (40.3 overs)
Nat Sciver 90 (96); Chinelle Henry 3/59 (10 overs)		Kycia Knight 39 (61); Charlie Dean 4/35 (9 overs)

England won by 142 runs
Sir Vivian Richards Stadium, North Sound
Umpires: Leslie Reifer (WI) and Jacqueline Williams (WI)
Player of the match: Nat Sciver (Eng)

- West Indies won the toss and elected to field.
- Women's Championship points: England 2, West Indies 0.

=== 2nd WODI ===
6 December 2022
14:00 (D/N)
Scorecard

England; 260 (48.1 overs)	v	West Indies; 118 (31.3 overs)
Amy Jones 70* (63); Hayley Matthews 3/50 (9.1 overs)		Rashada Williams 54* (80); Lauren Bell 4/32 (8 overs)

England won by 142 runs
Sir Vivian Richards Stadium, North Sound
Umpires: Nigel Duguid (WI) and Leslie Reifer (WI)
Player of the match: Amy Jones (Eng)

- England won the toss and elected to bat.
- Women's Championship points: England 2, West Indies 0.

=== 3rd WODI ===
9 December 2022
14:00 (D/N)
Scorecard

England; 256 (43.3 overs)	v	West Indies; 105 (37.3 overs)
Nat Sciver 85 (69); Shakera Selman 3/29 (9 overs)		Hayley Matthews 28 (39); Sophie Ecclestone 3/9 (9 overs)

England won by 151 runs
Sir Vivian Richards Stadium, North Sound
Umpires: Nigel Duguid (WI) and Jacqueline Williams (WI)
Player of the match: Nat Sciver (Eng)

- England won the toss and elected to bat.
- Kaysia Schultz (WI) made her WODI debut.
- Women's Championship points: England 2, West Indies 0.

== WT20I series ==
=== 1st WT20I ===
11 December 2022
18:00 (N)
Scorecard

West Indies; 105/7 (20 overs)	v	England; 106/2 (12.4 overs)
Rashada Williams 23 (26); Lauren Bell 3/22 (4 overs)		Danni Wyatt 59* (34)

England won by 8 wickets
Sir Vivian Richards Stadium, North Sound
Umpires: Leslie Reifer (WI) and Jacqueline Williams (WI)
Player of the match: Lauren Bell (Eng)

- England won the toss and elected to field.
- Djenaba Joseph (WI) made her T20I debut.

=== 2nd WT20I ===
14 December 2022
18:00 (N)
Scorecard

England; 141/6 (20 overs)	v	West Indies; 125/8 (20 overs)
Sophia Dunkley 43 (43); Hayley Matthews 3/15 (4 overs)		Afy Fletcher 18 (13); Charlie Dean 3/22 (4 overs)

England won by 16 runs
Kensington Oval, Bridgetown
Umpires: Patrick Gustard (WI) and Leslie Reifer (WI)
Player of the match: Sophia Dunkley (Eng)

- England won the toss and elected to bat.

=== 3rd WT20I ===
17 December 2022
18:00 (N)
Scorecard

England; 157/6 (20 overs)	v	West Indies; 140/8 (20 overs)
Sophia Dunkley 44 (31); Aaliyah Alleyne 1/12 (2 overs)		Rashada Williams 38 (29); Charlie Dean 4/19 (4 overs)

England won by 17 runs
Kensington Oval, Bridgetown
Umpires: Nigel Duguid (WI) and Patrick Gustard (WI)
Player of the match: Charlie Dean (Eng)

- England won the toss and elected to bat.
- Trishan Holder made her WT20I debut for the West Indies, having previously played 3 T20Is for Barbados.

=== 4th WT20I ===
18 December 2022
18:00 (N)
Scorecard

England; 131/8 (20 overs)	v	West Indies; 82 (16 overs)
Sophia Dunkley 35 (32); Cherry-Ann Fraser 3/20 (4 overs)		Hayley Matthews 23 (18); Lauren Bell 4/12 (3 overs)

England won by 49 runs
Kensington Oval, Bridgetown
Umpires: Nigel Duguid (WI) and Jacqueline Williams (WI)
Player of the match: Charlie Dean (Eng)

- England won the toss and elected to bat.
- Kaysia Schultz (WI) made her WT20I debut.

=== 5th WT20I ===
22 December 2022
18:00 (N)
Scorecard

West Indies; 43 (16.2 overs)	v	England; 44/2 (5.3 overs)
Djenaba Joseph 11 (22); Freya Davies 3/2 (2.2 overs)		Nat Sciver 20* (12); Karishma Ramharack 1/1 (1 over)

England won by 8 wickets
Kensington Oval, Bridgetown
Umpires: Patrick Gustard (WI) and Jacqueline Williams (WI)
Player of the match: Freya Davies (Eng)

- West Indies won the toss and elected to bat.
