= Australia women's cricket team in the West Indies in 2019–20 =

International cricket tour

	West Indies women	Australia women
- Dates: 5 – 18 September 2019
Captains	Stafanie Taylor	Meg Lanning (Note: Rachael Haynes captained Australia Women for the second WODI.)

One Day International series
- Results: Australia women won the 3-match series 3–0
Most runs	Stafanie Taylor (114)	Alyssa Healy (241)
Most wickets	Afy Fletcher (2); Shamilia Connell (2); Chinelle Henry (2)	Georgia Wareham (6)
- Player of the series: Ellyse Perry (Aus)

Twenty20 International series
- Results: Australia women won the 3-match series 3–0
Most runs	Britney Cooper (68)	Alyssa Healy (108)
Most wickets	Afy Fletcher (3)	Jess Jonassen (7)
- Player of the series: Alyssa Healy (Aus)

The Australia women's cricket team played the West Indies women's cricket team in September 2019. The tour consisted of three Women's One Day Internationals (WODIs), which formed part of the 2017–20 ICC Women's Championship, and three Women's Twenty20 International (WT20I) matches. The first fixture of the tour, at the Coolidge Cricket Ground in Antigua, was the Australia's first ever WODI match in the Caribbean. Australia won the WODI series 3–0, their fifth-consecutive series sweep and their fifteenth win in WODIs in a row. As a result, they became the first team to qualify for the 2021 Women's Cricket World Cup. Australia also won the WT20I series 3–0.

== Squads ==
WODIs		WT20Is	
West Indies	Australia	West Indies	Australia
Stafanie Taylor (c); ~~Hayley Matthews~~ (vc); Reniece Boyce (wk); Shamilia Connell; Britney Cooper; Afy Fletcher; Shabika Gajnabi; Sheneta Grimmond; Chinelle Henry; Stacy-Ann King; Kycia Knight; Kyshona Knight; Natasha McLean; Anisa Mohammed; Karishma Ramharack	Meg Lanning (c); Rachael Haynes (vc); Erin Burns; Nicola Carey; Ashleigh Gardner; Heather Graham; Alyssa Healy (wk); Jess Jonassen; Delissa Kimmince; Beth Mooney; Ellyse Perry; Megan Schutt; Tayla Vlaeminck; Georgia Wareham	Stafanie Taylor (c); Reniece Boyce (wk); Shamilia Connell; Britney Cooper; Afy Fletcher; Shabika Gajnabi; Sheneta Grimmond; Chinelle Henry; Stacy-Ann King; Kyshona Knight; Natasha McLean; Anisa Mohammed; Karishma Ramharack	Meg Lanning (c); Rachael Haynes (vc); Erin Burns; Nicola Carey; Ashleigh Gardner; Heather Graham; Alyssa Healy (wk); Jess Jonassen; Delissa Kimmince; Beth Mooney; Ellyse Perry; Megan Schutt; Tayla Vlaeminck; Georgia Wareham

Ahead of the tour, Hayley Matthews was withdrawn from the West Indies' squad after breaching Cricket West Indies' code of conduct. She was replaced by Sheneta Grimmond. Britney Cooper was added to the West Indies' squad for the third WODI match, replacing Kycia Knight, who was ruled out due to an injury.

== WODI series ==
=== 1st WODI ===
ICC Women's Championship
5 September 2019
14:00 (D/N)
Scorecard

Australia; 308/4 (50 overs)	v	West Indies; 130 (37.3 overs)
Alyssa Healy 122 (106); Shamilia Connell 2/53 (10 overs)		Stafanie Taylor 70* (114); Ellyse Perry 3/17 (5 overs)

Australia Women won by 178 runs
Coolidge Cricket Ground, Antigua
Umpires: Jonathan Blades (WI) and Patrick Gustard (WI)
Player of the match: Alyssa Healy (Aus)

- West Indies Women won the toss and elected to field.
- Shabika Gajnabi (WI) made her WODI debut.
- Meg Lanning (Aus) became the fastest player, male or female, to score thirteen centuries in ODI cricket (76 innings).
- Points: Australia Women 2, West Indies Women 0.

=== 2nd WODI ===
ICC Women's Championship
8 September 2019
09:30
Scorecard

Australia; 308/2 (50 overs)	v	West Indies; 157/8 (50 overs)
Ellyse Perry 112* (118); Stacy-Ann King 1/58 (9 overs)		Kyshona Knight 32 (81); Georgia Wareham 2/30 (10 overs)

Australia Women won by 151 runs
Sir Vivian Richards Stadium, Antigua
Umpires: Patrick Gustard (WI) and Christopher Taylor (WI)
Player of the match: Ellyse Perry (Aus)

- Australia Women won the toss and elected to bat.
- Sheneta Grimmond (WI) and Erin Burns (Aus) both made their WODI debuts.
- Points: Australia Women 2, West Indies Women 0.

=== 3rd WODI ===
ICC Women's Championship
11 September 2019
09:30
Scorecard

West Indies; 180 (50 overs)	v	Australia; 182/2 (31.1 overs)
Kyshona Knight 40 (72); Megan Schutt 3/24 (10 overs)		Alyssa Healy 61 (32); Stafanie Taylor 1/25 (6 overs)

Australia Women won by 8 wickets
Sir Vivian Richards Stadium, Antigua
Umpires: Jonathan Blades (WI) and Christopher Taylor (WI)
Player of the match: Alyssa Healy (Aus)

- West Indies Women won the toss and elected to bat.
- Ellyse Perry (Aus) became the third bowler to take 150 wickets in WODIs.
- Megan Schutt became the first Australian bowler to take a hat-trick in WODIs, and the first female bowler to take two hat-tricks in international cricket.
- Points: Australia Women 2, West Indies Women 0.

== WT20I series ==
=== 1st WT20I ===
14 September 2019
19:00 (N)
Scorecard

West Indies; 106/8 (20 overs)	v	Australia; 108/4 (18.5 overs)
Stafanie Taylor 44* (51); Megan Schutt 3/31 (4 overs)		Meg Lanning 54* (54); Chinelle Henry 2/15 (4 overs)

Australia Women won by 6 wickets
Kensington Oval, Bridgetown
Umpires: Jonathan Blades (WI) and Verdayne Smith (WI)
Player of the match: Meg Lanning (Aus)

- West Indies Women won the toss and elected to bat.
- Shabika Gajnabi, Sheneta Grimmond (WI) and Erin Burns (Aus) all made their WT20I debuts.

=== 2nd WT20I ===
16 September 2019
19:00 (N)
Scorecard

West Indies; 97/9 (20 overs)	v	Australia; 98/1 (14.3 overs)
Britney Cooper 39 (33); Jess Jonassen 2/19 (4 overs)		Alyssa Healy 58* (43); Afy Fletcher 1/13 (4 overs)

Australia Women won by 9 wickets
Kensington Oval, Bridgetown
Umpires: Verdayne Smith (WI) and Christopher Taylor (WI)
Player of the match: Alyssa Healy (Aus)

- Australia Women won the toss and elected to field.

=== 3rd WT20I ===
18 September 2019
19:00 (N)
Scorecard

West Indies; 81 (20 overs)	v	Australia; 83/1 (7.3 overs)
Britney Cooper 29 (35); Jess Jonassen 4/7 (4 overs)		Alyssa Healy 38 (16); Afy Fletcher 1/20 (2 overs)

Australia Women won by 9 wickets
Kensington Oval, Bridgetown
Umpires: Christopher Taylor (WI) and Jonathan Blades (WI)
Player of the match: Jess Jonassen (Aus)

- West Indies women won the toss and elected to bat.
- Stafanie Taylor (WI) played in her 100th WT20I match.
- This was both the biggest win for Australia Women and the biggest defeat for the West Indies Women, in terms of balls remaining, in WT20Is (75).
