= West Indies women's cricket team in South Africa in 2021–22 =

International cricket tour

	South Africa women	West Indies women
- Dates: 28 January – 6 February 2022
Captains	Suné Luus	Stafanie Taylor (Note: Anisa Mohammed captained the West Indies Women for the fourth WODI.)

One Day International series
- Results: South Africa women won the 4-match series 2–1
Most runs	Laura Wolvaardt (171)	Deandra Dottin (235)
Most wickets	Shabnim Ismail (10); Ayabonga Khaka (10)	Shamilia Connell (7)
- Player of the series: Ayabonga Khaka (SA)

The West Indies women's cricket team played the South Africa women's cricket team in January and February 2022. The tour consisted of four Women's One Day International (WODI) matches. Originally the tour was scheduled to consist of five WODIs and three Women's Twenty20 International (WT20I) matches, but a revised schedule was issued ahead of the 2022 Women's Cricket World Cup.

In January 2022, South Africa's captain Dane van Niekerk suffered a fractured ankle, ruling her out this series and the 2022 Women's Cricket World Cup. Lizelle Lee was also ruled out of South Africa's squad due to COVID-19, with Suné Luus named as the team's captain for the series in Lee's absence.

The first WODI match ended as a no result, with rain ending South Africa's run chase after 17.4 overs. Earlier, Deandra Dottin had made her career-best total, with 150 not out before the rain came. The second match finished in a tie, with the West Indies winning the Super Over. In the third match, Laura Wolvaardt scored a century as South Africa won by 96 runs to level the series. South Africa won the fourth and final match by six wickets to win the series 2–1. It was South Africa's fifth consecutive WODI series win, starting with a 3–0 win against New Zealand in January 2020.

== Squads ==
WODIs
South Africa	West Indies
Suné Luus (c); Chloe Tryon (vc); Anneke Bosch; Tazmin Brits; Trisha Chetty (wk); Lara Goodall; Shabnim Ismail; Sinalo Jafta (wk); Marizanne Kapp; Ayabonga Khaka; Masabata Klaas; Nadine de Klerk; Nonkululeko Mlaba; Raisibe Ntozakhe; Mignon du Preez; Tumi Sekhukhune; Andrie Steyn; Laura Wolvaardt	Stafanie Taylor (c); Anisa Mohammed (vc); Aaliyah Alleyne; Shemaine Campbelle; Shamilia Connell; Deandra Dottin; Afy Fletcher; Cherry-Ann Fraser; Jannillea Glasgow; Chinelle Henry; Kycia Knight; Mandy Mangru; Hayley Matthews; Chedean Nation; Karishma Ramharack; Kaysia Schultz; Shakera Selman; Rashada Williams

== Warm-up match ==
25 January 2022
10:00
Scorecard

West Indies XI; 196 (46.5 overs)	v	South Africa XI; 149 (37 overs)
Shemaine Campbelle 42 (48); Nadine de Klerk 3/27 (7 overs)		Tazmin Brits 32 (33); Cherry-Ann Fraser 3/11 (4 overs)

West Indies XI won by 53 runs
Wanderers Stadium, Johannesburg
Umpires: Siphelele Gasa (SA) and Stephen Harris (SA)

- West Indies XI won the toss and elected to bat.

== WODI series ==
=== 1st WODI ===
28 January 2022
14:00 (D/N)
Scorecard

West Indies; 234/3 (45.3 overs)	v	South Africa; 87/5 (17.4 overs)
Deandra Dottin 150* (158); Shabnim Ismail 1/24 (8 overs)		Tazmin Brits 33 (37); Karishma Ramharack 2/18 (4.4 overs)

No result
Wanderers Stadium, Johannesburg
Umpires: Siphelele Gasa (SA) and Stephen Harris (SA)

- South Africa Women won the toss and elected to field.
- No further play was possible due to rain.

=== 2nd WODI ===
31 January 2022
10:00
Scorecard

South Africa; 160 (40.4 overs)	v	West Indies; 160 (37.4 overs)
Suné Luus 46 (52); Hayley Matthews 2/21 (7.4 overs)		Deandra Dottin 37 (31); Ayabonga Khaka 5/26 (8 overs)

Match tied
(West Indies Women won the Super Over)
Wanderers Stadium, Johannesburg
Umpires: Siphelele Gasa (SA) and Arno Jacobs (SA)
Player of the match: Chinelle Henry (WI)

- West Indies Women won the toss and elected to field.
- The match was reduced to 41 overs per side due to rain.
- Ayabonga Khaka (SA) took her first five-wicket haul in WODIs.

=== 3rd WODI ===
3 February 2022
14:00 (D/N)
Scorecard

South Africa; 299/8 (50 overs)	v	West Indies; 203 (44.4 overs)
Laura Wolvaardt 117 (123); Shamilia Connell 4/54 (10 overs)		Kycia Knight 69 (93); Shabnim Ismail 4/37 (8.4 overs)

South Africa Women won by 96 runs
Wanderers Stadium, Johannesburg
Umpires: Lubabalo Gcuma (SA) and Arno Jacobs (SA)
Player of the match: Laura Wolvaardt (SA)

- South Africa Women won the toss and elected to bat.
- Aaliyah Alleyne replaced Stafanie Taylor as a concussion substitute for the West Indies Women.

=== 4th WODI ===
6 February 2022
10:00
Scorecard

West Indies; 174 (49.2 overs)	v	South Africa; 175/4 (39.5 overs)
Kycia Knight 48 (76); Shabnim Ismail 4/44 (10 overs)		Andrie Steyn 52 (73); Anisa Mohammed 2/31 (9 overs)

South Africa Women won by 6 wickets
Wanderers Stadium, Johannesburg
Umpires: Lubabalo Gcuma (SA) and Stephen Harris (SA)
Player of the match: Shabnim Ismail (SA)

- West Indies Women won the toss and elected to bat.
- Mandy Mangru (WI) made her WODI debut.
