= Conaree Sports Club =

Cricket ground

- Interactive map of Conaree Sports Club
- Location: Basseterre, Saint Kitts and Nevis
- Country: Saint Kitts and Nevis
- Coordinates: 17.3112°N 62.7092°W
- Establishment: 2007
- Last used: 2024
- As of 7 April 2024; Source: CricketArchive

Conaree Sports Club is a cricket ground located in Basseterre, Saint Kitts and Nevis. The ground is being used for hosting local and domestic cricket competitions of the West Indies since 2007.

== History ==
The first List A match was played at the ground on 10 November 2019, between Leeward Islands and Jamaica in the 2019–20 Regional Super50. The venue hosted matches of the 2022 Under-19 Men's Cricket World Cup.

The first women's List A match was held at the ground on 8 May 2023, between Guyana and Windward Islands in the 2023 Women's Super50 Cup. It hosted a first-class match for the first time on 7 February 2024, between Guyana and Trinidad and Tobago in the 2023–24 West Indies Championship.
