= Divya Saxena =

Canadian cricketer (born 1993)

Personal information
- Full name: Divya Ray Saxena
- Born: 16 September 1993 (age 33)
- Batting: Right-handed
- Bowling: Right-arm medium-fast
- Role: Bowler

International information
- National sides: Kenya (2006); Canada (2021–present)
- T20I debut (cap 15): 19 October 2021; Canada v Argentina
- Last T20I: 11 September 2023; Canada v USA

Domestic team information
- Years: Team
- 2023–present: Leeward Islands

Career statistics
Competition	WT20I
Matches	12
Runs scored	354
Batting average	44.25
100s/50s	0/2
Top score	70*
Balls bowled	198
Wickets	8
Bowling average	16.62
5 wickets in innings	0
10 wickets in match	0
Best bowling	2/3
Catches/stumpings	5/–
- Source: Cricinfo, 7 October 2024

Divya Saxena (born 16 September 1993) is a Canadian cricketer. She plays for the national women's cricket team as an all-rounder and has also previously played for the Kenya women's cricket team. She is currently the vice-captain of the Canadian team.

== Domestic career statistics ==
Ahead of the 2023 season, it was announced that Saxena would be in the Leeward Islands squad for the Women's Super50 Cup and Twenty20 Blaze. She was also named in Leeward Islands' squad for the 2024 Twenty20 Blaze.

== International career ==
=== Kenya ===
Saxena began her international career with the Kenya team. On 9 December 2006, at the age of 13 years, 84 days, she made her debut for Kenya against Zimbabwe at the Aga Khan Sports Club Ground, Nairobi, during that year's ICC Women's World Cup Qualifying Series Africa Region tournament. The following day, she played her second and final match for Kenya against Uganda at the Premier Club Ground, Nairobi. Both matches were played in a 50-over format.

=== Canada ===
On 7 October 2021, Saxena was named vice-captain of the Canada squad selected for the 2021 ICC Women's T20 World Cup Americas Qualifier, to be played later that month at the Reforma Athletic Club in Naucalpan, Mexico. She made her WT20I debut for Canada on 18 October 2021, against Argentina. She opened the batting, top scored for the match with 70*, and was awarded player of the match, which Canada won by 72 runs.

Three days later, on 22 October 2021, in Canada's second match against Argentina, Saxena again opened the batting, and top scored for the match with 39*. Once again, Canada won the match, by 9 wickets, and again, Saxena was player of the match.

On 24 October 2021, against the United States, Saxena opened the batting and top scored for the match with 40 runs to guide Canada to victory by seven runs. However, in that match, she also generated substantial controversy worldwide by allegedly obstructing the field in preventing the United States fielders from catching a ball she had edged into the air while she was yet to score any runs. To the surprise of many, she was given "not out" by the umpire. At the end of the tournament, she was also named MVP for scoring 180 runs in six innings and being not out in three of them. Canada nevertheless finished only third; the United States was the winner.
