= Jonathan Blades =

Barbadian cricket umpire (born 1975)

Personal information
- Born: 3 February 1975 (age 51); Christ Church, Barbados
- Role: Umpire

Umpiring information
- WODIs umpired: 1 (2021)
- WT20Is umpired: 1 (2021)
- Source: Cricinfo, 18 February 2017

Jonathan Blades (born 3 February 1975) is a Barbadian cricket umpire. He has stood in matches in the 2016–17 Regional Four Day Competition and the 2016–17 Regional Super50.
