= Steffi Soogrim =

West Indian cricketer

International information
- National side: West Indies
- Source: Cricinfo, 25 June 2021

Steffi Soogrim is a Trinidadian cricketer who plays for the Trinidad and Tobago women's national cricket team in the Women's Super50 Cup and the Twenty20 Blaze tournaments. In April 2021, Soogrim was named in Cricket West Indies' high-performance training camp in Antigua. In June 2021, Soogrim was named in the West Indies A Team for their series against Pakistan.
