= Guyana women's national cricket team =

Guyana
- Flag of Guyana

Personnel
- Captain: Shemaine Campbelle
- Coach: Clive Grimmond

Team information
- Founded: First recorded match: 1977
- Home ground: Providence Stadium, Providence

History
- First-class debut: Barbados in 1977 at Tanteen Recreation Ground, St. George's
- S50 wins: 0
- T20 Blaze wins: 0

The Guyana women's national cricket team is the women's representative cricket team of the country of Guyana. They compete in the Women's Super50 Cup and the Twenty20 Blaze.

== History ==
Guyana joined the West Indies domestic structure in 1977, competing in the Federation Championships, in which they finished 4th out of 5 teams. They competed again in the next edition of the tournament, 1980, winning two matches, against Grenada and Barbados.

Guyana then did not compete in any tournaments until 2001, losing every match in their return season. They have competed in most tournaments since, with a brief hiatus in 2006 and 2007, and joined the Twenty20 Blaze for its inaugural season in 2012. In 2013, they reached the semi-finals of the T20 competition before losing to eventual winners Jamaica. They achieved their best finish in the 50-over competition in 2014, reaching the final before losing to Jamaica.

In 2023, Guyana finished as runners-up in the Twenty20 Blaze and finished 5th in the Super50 Cup.

In the 2024 Twenty20 Blaze again, they were the runners-up, behind Jamaica. In the 2025 edition, Guyana became the champions after defeating Jamaica in super over.

== Players ==
=== Current squad ===
Based on squad announced for the 2023 season. Players in bold have international caps.

| Name | Nationality | Birth date | Batting style | Bowling style | Notes |
Batters
| **Realeanna Grimmond** | West Indies | 24 February 2005 (age 20) | Right-handed | Right-hand medium | |
| Tilleya Madramootoo | West Indies | Unknown | Right-handed | Unknown | |
| Katana Mentore | West Indies | 10 July 1994 (age 31) | Right-handed | Right-hand medium | |
All-rounders
| Analesia D'Aguiar | West Indies | Unknown | Unknown | Unknown | |
| **Cherry-Ann Fraser** | West Indies | 21 July 1999 (age 26) | Left-handed | Right-arm medium | |
| **Sheneta Grimmond** | West Indies | 9 August 1998 (age 27) | Right-handed | Right-arm off break | |
| **Mandy Mangru** | West Indies | 22 September 1999 (age 26) | Right-handed | Right-arm off break | |
| **Ashmini Munisar** | West Indies | 7 December 2003 (age 22) | Right-handed | Right-hand medium | |
Wicket-keepers
| **Shemaine Campbelle** | West Indies | 14 October 1992 (age 33) | Right-handed | Right-arm medium-fast | Captain |
Bowlers
| **Shabika Gajnabi** | West Indies | 14 July 2000 (age 25) | Right-handed | Right-arm medium | |
| Nyia Latchman | West Indies | Unknown | Unknown | Unknown | |
| Plaffiana Millington | West Indies | 6 January 1998 (age 28) | Right-handed | Right-arm off break | |
| Cyanna Retemiah | West Indies | Unknown | Right-handed | Right-hand medium | |
| **Kaysia Schultz** | West Indies | 17 April 1997 (age 28) | Right-handed | Slow left-arm orthodox | |

=== Notable players ===
Players who have played for Guyana and played internationally are listed below, in order of first international appearance (given in brackets):

- (Cricket West Indies) (United States) Candacy Atkins (Note: Atkins represented both the West Indies and the USA in international cricket.) (2003)
- (Cricket West Indies) (Canada) Indomatie Goordial-John (Note: Goordial-John represented both the West Indies and Canada in international cricket.) (2003)
- (Cricket West Indies) Shemaine Campbell (2009)
- (Cricket West Indies) Tremayne Smartt (2009)
- (Cricket West Indies) Subrina Munroe (2010)
- (Cricket West Indies) June Ogle (2011)
- (Cricket West Indies) Erva Giddings (2016)
- (United States) Onika Wallerson (2019)
- (Cricket West Indies) Shabika Gajnabi (2019)
- (Cricket West Indies) Sheneta Grimmond (2019)
- (Cricket West Indies) Cherry-Ann Fraser (2020)
- (Cricket West Indies) Mandy Mangru (2022)
- (Cricket West Indies) Kaysia Schultz (2022)
- (Cricket West Indies) Ashmini Munisar (2023)
- (Cricket West Indies) Realeanna Grimmond (2025)

== Honours ==
- Women's Super50 Cup:
  - Winners (0):
  - Best finish: Runners-up (2014 & 2024)
- Twenty20 Blaze:
  - Winners (0):
  - Best finish: Runners-up (2023)

== See also ==
- Guyana national cricket team
- Guyana Amazon Warriors (WCPL)
