= Warner Park Sporting Complex =

Cricket stadium in St. Kitts and Nevis

Warner Park
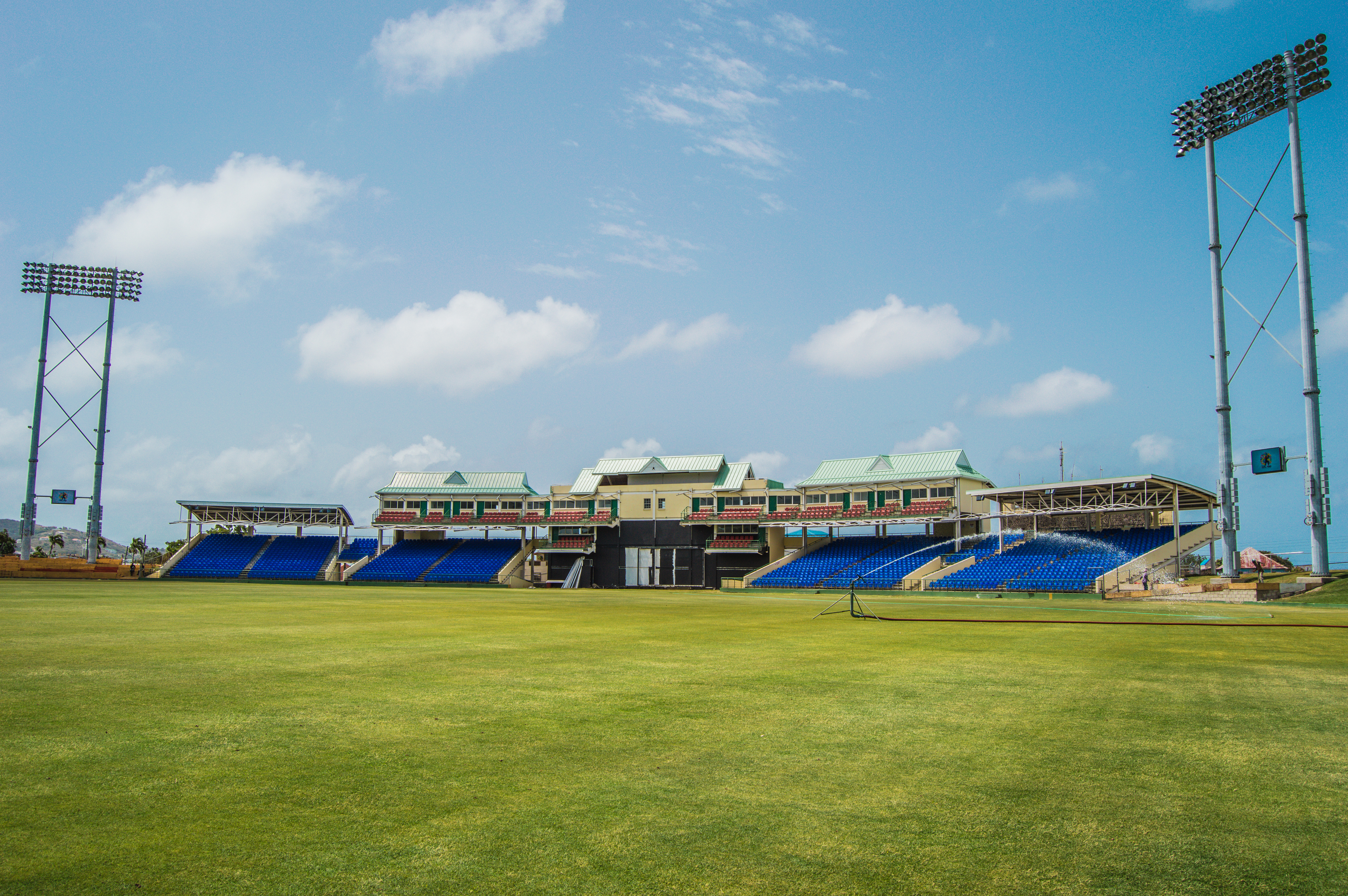
- Warner Park Cricket Stadium
- Interactive map of Warner Park

Ground information
- Location: Basseterre, St. Kitts and Nevis
- Country: West Indies
- Coordinates: 17°17′55″N 62°43′19″W
- Establishment: 2006
- Capacity: 8,000
- Tenants: Leeward Islands cricket team St. Kitts and Nevis Patriots
- End names
- Pavilion End; Lozack Road End

International information
- First Test: 21 June 2006: West Indies v India
- Last Test: 20 May 2011: West Indies v Pakistan
- First ODI: 23 May 2006: West Indies v India
- Last ODI: 28 July 2018: West Indies v Bangladesh
- First T20I: 2 August 2009: West Indies v Bangladesh
- Last T20I: 1 August 2022: West Indies v India
- First WODI: 4 November 2009: West Indies v England
- Last WODI: 19 September 2014: West Indies v New Zealand
- First WT20I: 9 November 2009: West Indies v England
- Last WT20I: 27 February 2012: West Indies v India

Team information
Leeward Islands	(1962 – present)
St. Kitts and Nevis Patriots	(2015 – present)
- As of 1 August 2022; Source: ESPNcricinfo

Warner Park Sporting Complex is an athletic facility in Basseterre, St. Kitts, St. Kitts and Nevis. It includes the Warner Park Stadium, which was one of the hosts for the 2007 Cricket World Cup. It is named after Sir Thomas Warner, the explorer who established the first English colony on St. Kitts.

The eastern segment contains the cricket pitch, pavilion, media centre and seating for 4,000 which can be increased with temporary stands to 10,000 for major events. The stadium was largely financed by Taiwan with donations totalling $2.74 million. The total project cost US$12 million, half for the cricket stadium and half for the football facilities.

The western segment contains the football stadium, with seating for 3,500. In the northern section of the park, there are three tennis courts, three netball / volleyball courts, the Len Harris Cricket Academy, and a small open savannah, Carnival City, used primarily for hosting Carnival events.

== T20 cricket and the CPL ==
The West Indies have generally used Warner Park Stadium to host lower ranked international teams in T20 cricket including matches against Afghanistan, Bangladesh and Ireland. While the West Indies remain unbeaten at this venue against those teams they suffered a couple of crushing defeats against the only other international side to have played T20 cricket here, England, being bowled out for 45 and 71 respectively.

In the CPL, Warner Park plays host to St Kitts and Nevis Patriots but the stadium has also been used for several of the knockout games as well and in 2021 it due to be used as the single venue for all CPL matches

The pitch at Warner Park Stadium has a history of favouring teams that bat second in T20 with a strong preference of sides who win the toss to field first.

== List of Five Wicket Hauls ==
A total of 8 five-wicket hauls have been taken at Warner Park, one in a Test match and seven in ODIs.

=== Test matches ===
Five-wicket hauls in Men's Test matches at Warner Park
No.	Bowler	Date	Team	Opposing Team	Inn	O	R	W	Result
1	Harbhajan Singh	22 June 2006	India	West Indies	1	44	147	5	Drawn

=== One Day Internationals ===
Five-wicket hauls in Men's One Day Internationals at Warner Park
No.	Bowler	Date	Team	Opposing Team	Inn	O	R	W	Result
1	Mitchell Johnson	6 July 2008	Australia	West Indies	2	7.5	29	5	Australia won
2	Sunil Narine	16 July 2012	West Indies	New Zealand	2	10	27	5	West Indies won
3	Imran Tahir	15 June 2016	South Africa	West Indies	2	9	45	7	South Africa won

Five-wicket hauls in Women's One Day Internationals at Warner Park
No.	Bowler	Date	Team	Opposing Team	Inn	O	R	W	Result
1	Dane van Niekerk	7 November 2013	South Africa	West Indies	2	7	28	5	South Africa won
2	Tremayne Smartt	12 September 2014	West Indies	New Zealand	1	10	24	5	West Indies won
3	Shakera Selman	17 September 2014	West Indies	New Zealand	1	10	15	5	West Indies won
4	Alana King	2 April 2024	Australia	West Indies	1	10	19	5	Australia won

== See also ==
- List of Test cricket grounds
