= Djenaba Joseph =

Trinidadian cricketer

Personal information
- Full name: Djenaba Faith Allison Joseph
- Born: 28 February 2004 (age 22); Trinidad and Tobago
- Batting: Right-handed
- Bowling: Right-arm medium
- Role: All-rounder

International information
- National side: West Indies
- Only ODI (cap 99): 8 October 2023 v Australia
- T20I debut (cap 44): 11 December 2022 v England
- Last T20I: 30 January 2023 v India

Domestic team information
- Years: Team
- 2022–present: Trinidad and Tobago
- 2023–present: Guyana Amazon Warriors

Career statistics
Competition	WT20I	WLA	WT20
Matches	6	1	8
Runs scored	28	15	47
Batting average	4.66	15.00	6.71
100s/50s	0/0	0/0	0/0
Top score	11	15	23
Balls bowled	–	–	12
Wickets	–	–	0
Bowling average	–	–	–
5 wickets in innings	–	–	0
10 wickets in match	–	–	0
Best bowling	–	–	–
Catches/stumpings	0/–	0/–	0/–
- Source: CricketArchive, 28 January 2024

Djenaba Faith Allison Joseph (born 28 February 2004) is a Trinidadian cricketer who plays for Trinidad and Tobago and the West Indies. She plays as a right-handed batter and right-arm medium bowler.

== Domestic career ==
During the 2022 season, Joseph starred on multiple occasions for the Trinidad and Tobago Under-19s team, for example with an all-round performance to help beat Windward Islands Under-19s in April and 56* to help heat Barbados Under-19s in July.

Joseph made her debut for the senior Trinidad and Tobago side on 9 June 2022, in the Twenty20 Blaze, although the match was abandoned with a toss. She went on to play five matches overall for Trinidad and Tobago that season, with a top score of 23 in her side's victory over Leeward Islands.

== International career ==
Joseph played for the West Indies Under-19s team throughout 2022, and was subsequently selected for the 2023 ICC Under-19 Women's T20 World Cup. She was ever-present for the side at the tournament, scoring 76 runs in her four innings.

On 11 December 2022, it was announced that Joseph had been named in the West Indies squad for their T20I series against England. She made her Twenty20 International debut later that day, against England at Sir Vivian Richards Stadium, where she made 8 runs. She played four matches overall in the series, scoring 23 runs at an average of 5.75.
