= Kaysia Schultz =

West Indian cricketer

Personal information
- Full name: Kaysia Christina Schultz
- Born: 17 April 1997 (age 29); Bartica, Guyana
- Batting: Right-handed
- Bowling: Slow left-arm orthodox
- Role: Bowler

International information
- National side: West Indies
- Only ODI (cap 96): 9 December 2022 v England
- T20I debut (cap 46): 18 December 2022 v England
- Last T20I: 25 January 2023 v South Africa

Domestic team information
- Years: Team
- 2016–present: Guyana
- 2022–present: Guyana Amazon Warriors
- Source: Cricinfo, 25 January 2023

Kaysia Christina Schultz (born 17 April 1997) is a Guyanese cricketer who currently plays for Guyana and Guyana Amazon Warriors as a slow left-arm orthodox bowler. Schultz was born in Bartica, Guyana, and began playing cricket when she was ten.

In August 2020, she was named in the West Indies' squad for the Women's Twenty20 International (WT20I) series against England, earning her maiden call-up to the national team. She was one of five Guyanese cricketers to be named in the squad for the tour to England. In May 2021, Schultz was awarded with a central contract from Cricket West Indies. In June 2021, Schultz was named in the West Indies A Team for their series against Pakistan.

In January 2022, Schultz was named in the West Indies' Women's One Day International (WODI) squad for their series against South Africa. In February 2022, she was named as one of three reserve players in the West Indies team for the 2022 Women's Cricket World Cup in New Zealand. She made her One Day International debut on 9 December 2022, against England.
