= Shawnisha Hector =

West Indies cricketer

Personal information
- Full name: Shawnisha Hector
- Batting: Right-handed
- Bowling: Right-arm medium
- Role: Bowler

International information
- National side: West Indies
- ODI debut (cap 91): 1 November 2019 v India
- Last ODI: 20 February 2026 v Sri Lanka
- T20I debut (cap 56): 22 June 2025 v South Africa
- Last T20I: 23 June 2025 v South Africa
- T20I shirt no.: 58

Domestic team information
- Years: Team
- 2016–present: Leeward Islands
- 2022: Trinbago Knight Riders

Career statistics
Competition	WODI
Matches	1
Runs scored	–
Batting average	–
100s/50s	–
Top score	–
Balls bowled	12
Wickets	0
Bowling average	–
5 wickets in innings	0
10 wickets in match	0
Best bowling	–
Catches/stumpings	0/–
- Source: Cricinfo, 14 May 2021

Shawnisha Hector is an Antiguan cricketer who plays for Leeward Islands, Trinbago Knight Riders and the West Indies. In October 2019, she was named in the West Indies' squad for their series against India. She became the first Antiguan female cricketer to be selected for the West Indies team. She made her Women's One Day International (WODI) debut for the West Indies against India on 1 November 2019. In May 2021, Hector was awarded a central contract from Cricket West Indies.
