= Ashmini Munisar =

West Indies cricketer (born 2003)

Personal information
- Full name: Ashmini Munisar
- Born: 7 December 2003 (age 22); Georgetown, Demerara-Mahaica, Guyana
- Batting: Right-handed
- Bowling: Right-arm off break

International information
- National side: West Indies (2023–present)
- ODI debut (cap 98): 28 June 2023 v Ireland
- Last ODI: 27 December 2024 v India
- T20I debut (cap 50): 4 July 2023 v Ireland
- Last T20I: 18 October 2024 v New Zealand
- T20I shirt no.: 75

Domestic team information
- Years: Team
- 2022–present: Guyana
- 2023–present: Guyana Amazon Warriors
- Source: ESPNcricinfo, 19 October 2024

Ashmini Munisar (born 7 December 2003) is a Guyanese cricketer, who is a right-handed batter and a right-arm off break bowler. She represents the Guyana women's cricket team in regional cricket. She captained the West Indies in the 2023 Under-19 Women's T20 World Cup.

== International career ==
In June 2023, she earned her maiden call-up to the West Indies women's cricket team for their series against Ireland. She made her Women's One Day International (WODI) debut for the West Indies, on 28 June 2023, against Ireland. In July 2023, she was named in Women's Twenty20 International (WT20I) squad for the same series. She made her WT20 debut for the West Indies, on 4 July 2023, against Ireland. She was named in the West Indies squad for the 2024 ICC Women's T20 World Cup. Munisar was part of the West Indies squad for the 2025 Women's Cricket World Cup Qualifier in Pakistan in April 2025.
