= Jannillea Glasgow =

West Indian cricketer

Personal information
- Born: 5 January 2004 (age 22); St Vincent and the Grenadines
- Batting: Left-handed
- Bowling: Left-arm fast-medium
- Role: Bowler

International information
- National side: West Indies
- ODI debut (cap 101): 19 January 2025 v Bangladesh
- Last ODI: 21 January 2025 v Bangladesh
- T20I debut (cap 48): 30 January 2023 v India
- Last T20I: 28 April 2024 v Pakistan

Domestic team information
- Years: Team
- 2022–present: Windward Islands
- 2022: Trinbago Knight Riders
- 2023–present: Barbados Royals
- Source: ESPNcricinfo, 30 January 2023

Jannillea Glasgow (born 5 January 2004) is a West Indian cricketer. In April 2021, Glasgow was named in Cricket West Indies' high-performance training camp in Antigua. In June 2021, Glasgow was named in the West Indies A Team for their series against Pakistan.

== International career ==
In January 2022, Glasgow was named in the West Indies' One Day International (ODI) squad for their series against South Africa. In February 2022, she was named as one of three reserve players in the West Indies team for the 2022 Women's Cricket World Cup in New Zealand.

On 30 January 2023, it was announced that Glasgow had been added to the West Indies squad for the 2022–23 South Africa women's Tri-Nation Series. She made her Twenty20 International debut later that day, against India at Buffalo Park, East London in South Africa.

Glasgow was part of the West Indies squad for the 2025 Women's Cricket World Cup Qualifier in Pakistan in April 2025.
