= Qiana Joseph =

West Indian cricketer (born 2001)

Personal information
- Full name: Qiana Joseph
- Born: 22 January 2001 (age 25); Saint Lucia
- Batting: Left-handed
- Bowling: Slow left-arm orthodox
- Role: Bowler

International information
- National side: West Indies (2017–present)
- ODI debut (cap 85): 2 July 2017 v South Africa
- Last ODI: 21 June 2024 v Sri Lanka
- T20I debut (cap 42): 31 August 2021 v South Africa
- Last T20I: 18 October 2024 v New Zealand
- T20I shirt no.: 73

Domestic team information
- Years: Team
- 2014: Saint Lucia
- 2015: North Windward Islands
- 2016–present: Windward Islands
- 2022–present: Barbados Royals

Career statistics
Competition	WODI	WT20I
Matches	11	16
Runs scored	49	168
Batting average	9.80	18.66
100s/50s	0/0	0/1
Top score	21	52
Balls bowled	454	171
Wickets	12	4
Bowling average	29.16	42.75
5 wickets in innings	0	0
10 wickets in match	0	0
Best bowling	2/24	2/26
Catches/stumpings	2/–	2/–
- Source: ESPNcricinfo, 19 October 2024

Qiana Joseph (born 1 January 2001) is a Saint Lucian cricketer who plays for Windward Islands and Barbados Royals as a left arm orthodox bowler. In May 2017, she was named in the West Indies squad for the 2017 Women's Cricket World Cup. She made her Women's One Day International (WODI) debut for the West Indies against South Africa in the 2017 Women's Cricket World Cup on 2 July 2017. In November 2018, she was named in the West Indies' squad replacing the injured Sheneta Grimmond for the 2018 ICC Women's World Twenty20 tournament in the West Indies.

In May 2021, Joseph was awarded with a central contract from Cricket West Indies. In June 2021, Joseph was named in the West Indies A Team for their series against Pakistan. In August 2021, Joseph was named in the West Indies' Women's Twenty20 International (WT20I) squad for their series against South Africa. Joseph made her WT20I debut on 31 August 2021, for the West Indies against South Africa.

In October 2021, she was named in the West Indies team for the 2021 Women's Cricket World Cup Qualifier tournament in Zimbabwe.

She was named in the West Indies squad for the 2024 ICC Women's T20 World Cup. She made her first WT20I half-century in the final group match against England, scoring 52 as West Indies clinched a semi-final place with a six-wicket win.

Joseph was part of the West Indies squad for the 2025 Women's Cricket World Cup Qualifier in Pakistan in April 2025.
