= Leeward Islands women's cricket team =

Leeward Islands
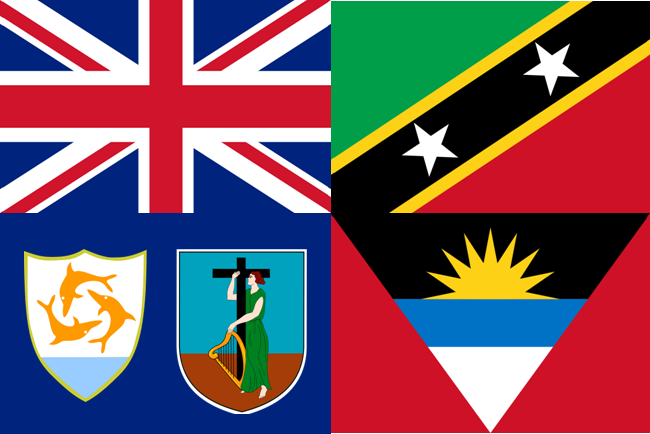

Personnel
- Captain: Saneldo Willett
- Coach: Percy Daniel

Team information
- Colours: Maroon Gold
- Founded: First recorded match: 2016

History
- S50 wins: 0
- T20 Blaze wins: 0

The Leeward Islands women's cricket team is the women's cricket team representing the member countries of the Leeward Islands Cricket Association: Antigua and Barbuda, Saint Kitts, Nevis, Anguilla, Montserrat, British Virgin Islands, US Virgin Islands and Sint Maarten. They compete in the Women's Super50 Cup and the Twenty20 Blaze, which they joined in 2016.

== History ==
The Leeward Islands joined the West Indies domestic structure in 2016, playing in the Regional Women's Championship and the Regional Women's Twenty20 Championship. They finished bottom of their group in both competitions.

The side have competed in every 50-over and T20 competition since, and won their first ever match in their opening game of the 2024 Twenty20 Blaze, defeating Barbados by 12 runs.

In 2019, Leeward Islands captain Shawnisha Hector became the first Antiguan female cricketer to play for the West Indies.

== Players ==
=== Current squad ===
Based on squad announced for the 2023 season. Players in bold have international caps.

Name	Nationality	Birth date	Batting style	Bowling style	Notes
Batters
Kimberley Anthony	West Indies	Unknown	Unknown	Unknown	
All-rounders
Melicia Clarke	West Indies	Unknown	Left-handed	Right-arm medium	
Amanda Edwards	West Indies	Unknown	Right-handed	Right-arm medium	
Rozel Liburd	West Indies	Unknown	Right-handed	Right-arm medium	
Davronique Maynard	West Indies	Unknown	Right-handed	Unknown	
Chey-Anne Moses	West Indies	Unknown	Unknown	Unknown	
Jenison Richards	West Indies	Unknown	Unknown	Unknown	
**Divya Saxena**	Canada	16 September 1993 (age 31)	Right-handed	Right-arm medium	
Saneldo Willett	West Indies	Unknown	Right-handed	Unknown	Captain
Wicket-keepers
Terez Parker	West Indies	Unknown	Right-handed	–	
Bowlers
Davanna Claxton	West Indies	Unknown	Unknown	Right-arm medium	
**Jahzara Claxton**	West Indies	12 March 2006 (age 19)	Left-handed	Right-arm medium	
**Shawnisha Hector**	West Indies	Unknown	Right-handed	Right-arm medium	
Tynetta McKoy	West Indies	Unknown	Unknown	Unknown	
Tonya Martin	West Indies	Unknown	Unknown	Unknown	

=== Notable players ===
Players who have played for the Leeward Islands and played internationally are listed below, in order of first international appearance (given in brackets):

- (Cricket West Indies) Reniece Boyce (2017)
- (United States) Shebani Bhaskar (2019)
- (Cricket West Indies) Shawnisha Hector (2019)
- (Canada) Divya Saxena (2021)
- (Canada) Tiffany Thorpe (2025)
- (Cricket West Indies) Jahzara Claxton (2025)

== See also ==
- Leeward Islands cricket team
