= Zaida James =

West Indian cricketer (born 2004)

Personal information
- Full name: Zaida Amiya James
- Born: 30 October 2004 (age 22); Gros Islet, Saint Lucia
- Batting: Left-handed
- Bowling: Slow left-arm orthodox
- Role: All-rounder

International information
- National side: West Indies
- ODI debut (cap 97): 26 June 2023 v Ireland
- Last ODI: 21 June 2024 v Sri Lanka
- ODI shirt no.: 55
- T20I debut (cap 49): 30 January 2023 v India
- Last T20I: 18 October 2024 v New Zealand
- T20I shirt no.: 55

Domestic team information
- Years: Team
- 2018/19–present: Windward Islands
- 2022: Guyana Amazon Warriors
- 2023–present: Trinbago Knight Riders
- Source: Cricinfo, 19 October 2024

Zaida James (born 30 October 2004) is a Saint Lucian cricketer who plays for the Windward Islands women's cricket team in the Women's Super50 Cup and the Twenty20 Blaze tournaments. In April 2021, James was named in Cricket West Indies' high-performance training camp in Antigua. In June 2021, James was named in the West Indies A Team for their series against Pakistan.

== International career ==
On 30 January 2023, it was announced that James had been added to the West Indies squad for the 2022–23 South Africa women's Tri-Nation Series. She made her Twenty20 International debut later that day, against India at Buffalo Park, East London in South Africa. She was named in the West Indies squad for the 2024 ICC Women's T20 World Cup. James was part of the West Indies squad for the 2025 Women's Cricket World Cup Qualifier in Pakistan in April 2025.
