= Mandy Mangru =

West Indian cricketer (born 1999)

Personal information
- Born: 22 September 1999 (age 27); Georgetown, Guyana
- Batting: Right-handed
- Bowling: Right-arm off break
- Role: Batting Allrounder

International information
- National side: West Indies
- ODI debut (cap 95): 6 February 2022 v South Africa
- Last ODI: 27 December 2024 v India
- ODI shirt no.: 99
- T20I debut (cap 52): 10 October 2024 v Bangladesh
- Last T20I: 15 December 2024 v India
- T20I shirt no.: 99

Domestic team information
- Years: Team
- 2015–present: Guyana
- 2022: Barbados Royals

Career statistics
Competition	ODI	T20I
Matches	5	5
Runs scored	30	20
Batting average	10.00	6.66
100s/50s	0/0	0/0
Top score	15	17
Balls bowled	18	–
Wickets	0	–
Bowling average	–	–
5 wickets in innings	–	–
10 wickets in match	–	–
Best bowling	–	–
Catches/stumpings	4/–	2/–
- Source: Cricinfo, 28 January 2024

Mandy Mangru (born 22 September 1999) is a Guyanese cricketer who plays for the Guyana women's national cricket team in the Women's Super50 Cup and the Twenty20 Blaze tournaments. In April 2021, Mangru was named in Cricket West Indies' high-performance training camp in Antigua.

== Career ==
In June 2021, Mangru was named in the West Indies A Team for their series against Pakistan.

In January 2022, Mangru was named in the West Indies' Women's One Day International (WODI) squad for their series against South Africa. She made her WODI debut on 6 February 2022, for the West Indies against South Africa. Later the same month, she was named as one of three reserve players in the West Indies team for the 2022 Women's Cricket World Cup in New Zealand. Ahead of the World Cup semi-final match against Australia, Mangru was named as a replacement for Afy Fletcher, after Fletcher tested positive for COVID-19.

She was named in the West Indies squad for the 2024 ICC Women's T20 World Cup. She made her Women's Twenty20 International (WT20I) debut for West Indies against Bangladesh on 10 October 2024 in the Women's T20 World Cup.

Mangru was part of the West Indies squad for the 2025 Women's Cricket World Cup Qualifier in Pakistan in April 2025.
