= Shabika Gajnabi =

West Indies cricketer (born 2000)

Personal information
- Full name: Shabika Gajnabi
- Born: 14 July 2000 (age 26); Corentyne, Guyana
- Batting: Right-handed
- Bowling: Right-arm medium
- Role: Bowler

International information
- National side: West Indies (2019–present)
- ODI debut (cap 88): 5 September 2019 v Australia
- Last ODI: 18 June 2024 v Sri Lanka
- T20I debut (cap 38): 14 September 2019 v Australia
- Last T20I: 5 October 2023 v Australia

Domestic team information
- Years: Team
- 2016–present: Guyana
- 2022–present: Guyana Amazon Warriors

Career statistics
Competition	WODI	WT20I
Matches	18	31
Runs scored	96	238
Batting average	6.85	9.91
100s/50s	0/0	0/0
Top score	22	33
Balls bowled	144	117
Wickets	5	3
Bowling average	26.00	52.66
5 wickets in innings	0	0
10 wickets in match	0	0
Best bowling	2/25	1/8
Catches/stumpings	9/–	14/–
- Source: Cricinfo, 15 October 2024

Shabika Gajnabi (born 14 July 2000) is a Guyanese cricketer who plays for Guyana, Guyana Amazon Warriors and the West Indies. She plays as a right-arm medium bowler. In August 2019, she was named in the West Indies' squad for their series against Australia. She made her Women's One Day International (WODI) debut for the West Indies against Australia on 5 September 2019. She made her Women's Twenty20 International (WT20I) debut for the West Indies, also against Australia, on 14 September 2019.

In June 2021, Gajnabi was named as the vice-captain of the West Indies A Team for their series against Pakistan. In October 2021, she was named as one of three reserve players in the West Indies team for the 2021 Women's Cricket World Cup Qualifier tournament in Zimbabwe.

Gajnabi was part of the West Indies squad for the 2025 Women's Cricket World Cup Qualifier in Pakistan in April 2025.
