= Reniece Boyce =

West Indian cricketer (born 1997)

Personal information
- Full name: Reniece Boyce
- Born: 3 September 1997 (age 29)
- Batting: Right-handed
- Role: Wicket-keeper

International information
- National side: West Indies (2017–2019)
- ODI debut (cap 84): 2 July 2017 v South Africa
- Last ODI: 19 September 2021 v South Africa
- T20I debut (cap 36): 14 March 2018 v New Zealand
- Last T20I: 18 September 2019 v Australia

Domestic team information
- Years: Team
- 2015–2023: Trinidad and Tobago
- 2022: Barbados Royals
- 2024–present: Leeward Islands

Career statistics
Competition	WODI	WT20I
Matches	6	6
Runs scored	42	20
Batting average	7.00	4.00
100s/50s	0/0	0/0
Top score	14	12
Catches/stumpings	1/2	0/0
- Source: ESPNcricinfo, 21 September 2021

Reniece Boyce (born 3 September 1997) is a Trinidadian cricketer who currently plays for Leeward Islands as a right-handed wicket-keeper batter. In May 2017, she was named in the West Indies squad for the 2017 Women's Cricket World Cup. She made her Women's One Day International (WODI) debut for the West Indies against South Africa in the 2017 Women's Cricket World Cup on 2 July 2017.

In October 2018, Cricket West Indies (CWI) awarded her a women's contract for the 2018–19 season. In June 2021, Boyce was named as the captain of the West Indies A Team for their series against Pakistan.
