= Sheneta Grimmond =

West Indies cricketer

Personal information
- Full name: Sheneta Shanata Grimmond
- Born: 9 August 1998 (age 28); Guyana
- Batting: Right-handed
- Bowling: Right-arm off break
- Role: Bowler

International information
- National side: West Indies (2019–2023)
- ODI debut (cap 89): 8 September 2019 v Australia
- Last ODI: 6 December 2022 v England
- T20I debut (cap 39): 14 September 2019 v Australia
- Last T20I: 25 January 2023 v South Africa

Domestic team information
- Years: Team
- 2015–present: Guyana
- 2022: Trinbago Knight Riders
- 2023–2024: Guyana Amazon Warriors

Career statistics
| Competition | WODI | WT20I |
|---|---|---|
| Matches | 9 | 15 |
| Runs scored | 79 | 80 |
| Batting average | 13.16 | 7.27 |
| 100s/50s | 0/0 | 0/0 |
| Top score | 34 | 15 |
| Balls bowled | 253 | 190 |
| Wickets | 5 | 7 |
| Bowling average | 41.80 | 31.00 |
| 5 wickets in innings | 0 | 0 |
| 10 wickets in match | 0 | 0 |
| Best bowling | 4/33 | 3/33 |
| Catches/stumpings | 2/– | 3/– |
- Source: Cricinfo, 11 May 2025

Sheneta Shanata Grimmond (born 9 August 1998) is a Guyanese cricketer who plays for Guyana, Trinbago Knight Riders and the West Indies. She plays primarily as a right-arm off break bowler. In August 2019, she was named in the West Indies squad for their series against Australia. She made her Women's One Day International (WODI) debut for the West Indies against Australia on 8 September 2019. She made her Women's Twenty20 International (WT20I) debut for the West Indies, also against Australia, on 14 September 2019. In January 2020, she was named in West Indies' squad for the 2020 ICC Women's T20 World Cup in Australia. In May 2021, Grimmond was awarded with a central contract from Cricket West Indies.

In June 2021, Grimmond was named in the West Indies A Team for their series against Pakistan. In October 2021, she was named in the West Indies team for the 2021 Women's Cricket World Cup Qualifier tournament in Zimbabwe.
