= Britney Cooper =

West Indian cricketer (born 1989)

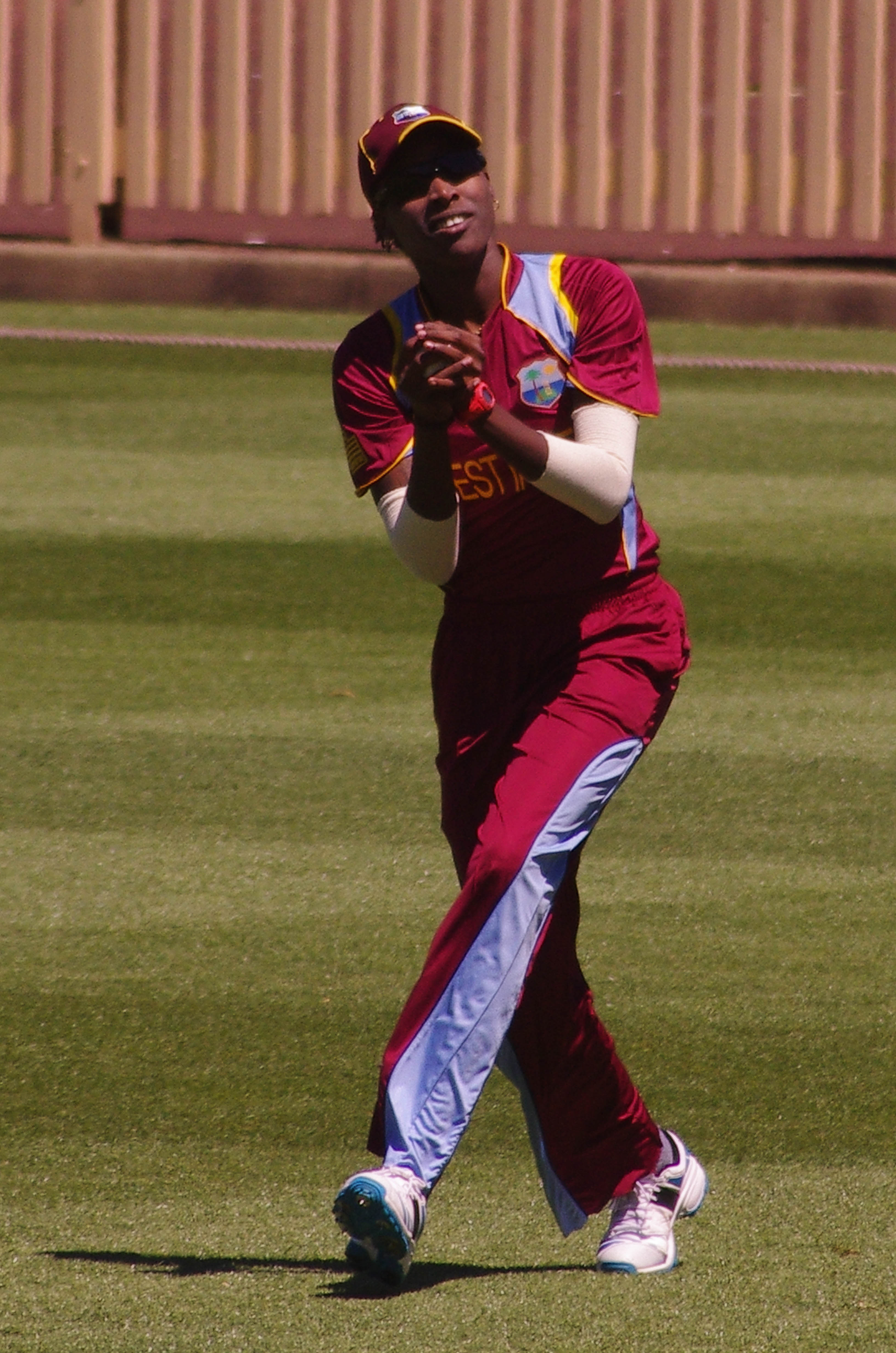
- Cooper in 2014

Personal information
- Full name: Britney Cooper
- Born: 23 August 1989 (age 37); Trinidad
- Batting: Right-handed
- Bowling: Right-arm fast-medium
- Role: Batter

International information
- National side: West Indies (2009–present)
- ODI debut (cap 69): 21 October 2009 v South Africa
- Last ODI: 7 September 2021 v South Africa
- T20I debut (cap 21): 25 October 2009 v South Africa
- Last T20I: 25 January 2023 v South Africa

Domestic team information
- Years: Team
- 2010–present: Trinidad and Tobago
- 2022: Barbados Royals
- 2023–present: Trinbago Knight Riders

Career statistics
Competition	WODI	WT20I
Matches	49	76
Runs scored	575	633
Batting average	16.42	11.10
100s/50s	0/1	0/1
Top score	55*	61
Catches/stumpings	24/–	27/–
- Source: ESPNCricinfo, 18 January 2024

Britney Cooper (born 23 August 1989) is a Trinidadian cricketer who plays for Trinidad and Tobago, Barbados Royals and the West Indies as a right-handed batter. She top-scored during the semi-final of the 2016 ICC Women's World Twenty20 against New Zealand with a score of 61, helping her team to qualify for the final.

In October 2018, she was named in the West Indies' squad for the 2018 ICC Women's World Twenty20 tournament in the West Indies. In January 2020, she was named in West Indies' squad for the 2020 ICC Women's T20 World Cup in Australia. In May 2021, Cooper was awarded with a central contract from Cricket West Indies.
