= Chedean Nation =

Jamaican cricketer (born 1986)

Personal information
- Full name: Chedean Natasha Nation
- Born: 31 October 1986 (age 40); Jamaica
- Batting: Right-handed
- Bowling: Right-arm medium
- Role: All-rounder

International information
- National side: West Indies (2008–present)
- ODI debut (cap 57): 24 June 2008 v Ireland
- Last ODI: 21 June 2022 v Sri Lanka
- T20I debut (cap 7): 27 June 2008 v Ireland
- Last T20I: 18 October 2023 v New Zealand
- T20I shirt no.: 8

Domestic team information
- Years: Team
- 2002–present: Jamaica
- 2022: Guyana Amazon Warriors
- 2023–present: Barbados Royals

Career statistics
Competition	WODI	WT20I
Matches	68	57
Runs scored	951	552
Batting average	17.29	15.33
100s/50s	0/1	0/2
Top score	51*	63*
Balls bowled	289	126
Wickets	7	7
Bowling average	29.57	18.71
5 wickets in innings	0	0
10 wickets in match	0	0
Best bowling	3/22	2/14
Catches/stumpings	12/–	8/–
- Source: ESPNcricinfo, 19 October 2024

Chedean Natasha Nation (born 31 October 1986) is a Jamaican cricketer who has represented the West Indies internationally. She plays domestic cricket for Jamaica and Guyana Amazon Warriors.

== Career ==
A right-arm medium-pace bowler, Nation made her international debut in June 2008, on a tour of Ireland. She played both One Day International (ODI) and Twenty20 International matches on the tour, and the following month also played in the series against the Netherlands and England. In the first ODI of another series against England in November 2009, Nation took figures of 3/22 from five overs, helping her team to an upset 40-run win.

In October 2016, Nation was recalled to the West Indian squad for the following month's tour of India.

In October 2018, Cricket West Indies (CWI) awarded her a contract for the 2018–19 season. Later the same month, she was named in the West Indies' squad for the 2018 ICC Women's World Twenty20 tournament in the West Indies. In January 2020, she was named in the West Indies' squad for the 2020 ICC Women's T20 World Cup in Australia. In May 2021, Nation was awarded a central contract by CWI.

On 2 July 2021, she and her teammate Chinelle Henry had collapsed on the field in a space of ten minutes during the second women's T20I match between West Indies and Pakistan at the Coolidge Cricket Ground in Antigua. Both of them were immediately taken to the hospital and they were reportedly in conscious and stable position.

In October 2021, she was named in the West Indies team for the 2021 Women's Cricket World Cup Qualifier tournament in Zimbabwe. In February 2022, she was named in the West Indies team for the 2022 Women's Cricket World Cup in New Zealand.

She was named in the West Indies squad for the 2024 ICC Women's T20 World Cup.
