= Aaliyah Alleyne =

West Indies cricketer (born 1994)

Personal information
- Full name: Aaliyah Alicia Alleyne
- Born: 11 November 1994 (age 32); Bridgetown, Barbados
- Batting: Right-handed
- Bowling: Right-arm medium
- Role: Bowler

International information
- National sides: West Indies (2019–present); Barbados (2022)
- ODI debut (cap 90): 1 November 2019; West Indies v India
- Last ODI: 21 June 2024; Sri Lanka v Australia
- T20I debut (cap 40/1): 9 November 2019; West Indies v India
- Last T20I: 18 October 2024; West Indies v New Zealand
- T20I shirt no.: 78

Domestic team information
- Years: Team
- 2013–present: Barbados
- 2016: Durham
- 2022–present: Barbados Royals

Career statistics
Competition	WODI	WT20I
Matches	31	47
Runs scored	292	326
Batting average	14.60	11.64
100s/50s	0/0	0/0
Top score	35	49*
Balls bowled	803	562
Wickets	20	16
Bowling average	33.80	45.06
5 wickets in innings	0	0
10 wickets in match	0	0
Best bowling	2/38	2/16
Catches/stumpings	9/–	9/–
- Source: ESPNCricinfo, 19 October 2024

Aaliyah Alicia Alleyne (born 11 November 1994) is a Barbadian cricketer who plays as a right-arm medium bowler. In October 2019, she was named in the West Indies squad for their series against India. She made her Women's One Day International (WODI) debut for the West Indies against India on 1 November 2019. She made her Women's Twenty20 International (WT20I) debut for the West Indies, also against India, on 9 November 2019. In January 2020, she was named in West Indies' squad for the 2020 ICC Women's T20 World Cup in Australia. In May 2021, Alleyne was awarded with a central contract from Cricket West Indies. She plays domestic cricket for Barbados and Barbados Royals, as well as spending one season with Durham in 2016.

In October 2021, she was named in the West Indies team for the 2021 Women's Cricket World Cup Qualifier tournament in Zimbabwe. In February 2022, she was named in the West Indies team for the 2022 Women's Cricket World Cup in New Zealand. In July 2022, she was named in the Barbados team for the cricket tournament at the 2022 Commonwealth Games in Birmingham, England.

She was named in the West Indies squad for the 2024 ICC Women's T20 World Cup.

Alleyne was part of the West Indies squad for the 2025 Women's Cricket World Cup Qualifier in Pakistan in April 2025.
