= Karishma Ramharack =

West Indian cricketer (born 1995)

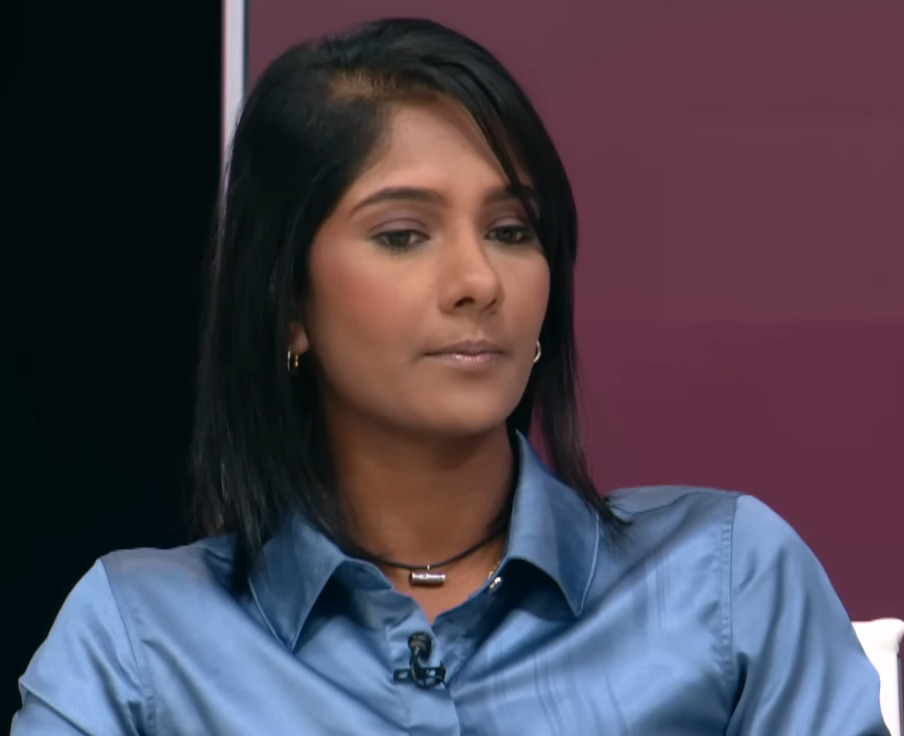

Personal information
- Full name: Karishma Ramharack
- Born: 20 January 1995 (age 31); El Dorado, Tunapuna–Piarco, Trinidad and Tobago
- Batting: Left-handed
- Bowling: Right-arm off break
- Role: Bowler

International information
- National side: West Indies (2019–present)
- ODI debut (cap 87): 11 February 2019 v Pakistan
- Last ODI: 23 January 2025 v Bangladesh
- T20I debut (cap 37): 3 February 2019 v Pakistan
- Last T20I: 30 January 2025 v Bangladesh
- T20I shirt no.: 77

Domestic team information
- Years: Team
- 2014–present: Trinidad and Tobago
- 2022–present: Guyana Amazon Warriors

Career statistics
| Competition | WODI | WT20I |
|---|---|---|
| Matches | 32 | 42 |
| Runs scored | 108 | 19 |
| Batting average | 7.2 | 4.75 |
| 100s/50s | 0/0 | 0/0 |
| Top score | 14* | 3* |
| Balls bowled | 1221 | 758 |
| Wickets | 31 | 33 |
| Bowling average | 28.83 | 25.03 |
| 5 wickets in innings | 0 | 0 |
| 10 wickets in match | 0 | 0 |
| Best bowling | 4/12 | 4/15 |
| Catches/stumpings | 12/– | 9/– |
- Source: Cricinfo, 8 February 2025

Karishma Ramharack (born 20 January 1995) is a Trinidad cricketer who plays for Trinidad and Tobago, Guyana Amazon Warriors and the West Indies as a right-arm off break bowler. In January 2019, she was named in the West Indies squad for their series against Pakistan. She made her Women's Twenty20 International cricket (WT20I) debut for the West Indies against Pakistan Women on 3 February 2019. She made her Women's One Day International cricket (WODI) debut for the West Indies, also against Pakistan Women, on 11 February 2019. In July 2019, Cricket West Indies awarded her with a central contract for the first time, ahead of the 2019–20 season.

In October 2021, she was named as one of three reserve players in the West Indies team for the 2021 Women's Cricket World Cup Qualifier tournament in Zimbabwe. In February 2022, she was named in the West Indies team for the 2022 Women's Cricket World Cup in New Zealand.

In the 2023 Women's T20 World Cup, Ramharack was named in the team of the tournament. She was selected in the West Indies squad for the 2024 ICC Women's T20 World Cup.

Ramharack was part of the West Indies squad for the 2025 Women's Cricket World Cup Qualifier in Pakistan in April 2025.
