= 2025 Women's Super50 Cup =

Women's cricket tournament in the West Indies

- Dates: 24 February – 7 March 2025
- Administrator: Cricket West Indies
- Cricket format: List A
- Tournament format(s): Single round-robin and playoffs
- Host: Saint Kitts and Nevis
- Champions: Trinidad and Tobago
- Runners-up: Barbados
- Participants: 6
- Matches: 18
- Most runs: (Guyana) Realeanna Grimmond (234)
- Most wickets: (Barbados) Keila Elliott (14)

The 2025 Women's Super50 Cup was the 37th edition of the Women's Super50 Cup, a women's List A cricket competition played in the West Indies. The tournament began from 24 February and concluded on 7 March 2025, with the 6 local teams that participated and all matches were held in Saint Kitts. The tournament formed part of West Indies' preparation for the 2025 Women's Cricket World Cup Qualifier. The tournament was followed by the 2025 Twenty20 Blaze. Jamaica were the defending champions.

In the final, Trinidad and Tobago defeated Barbados by 7 wickets to win their 14th title since 2017.

== Competition format ==
The matches were played in a round-robin format with 50 overs per side in a group of six, therefore each team played 5 matches overall, with the top two teams advanced to the final. This year, the teams competed for a championship prize of US$30,000 with the runners-up securing US$15,000.

The group worked on a points system with positions being based on the total points. Points were awarded as follows:

Win: 4 points
Abandoned/No Result: 2 points.
Loss: 0 points.

== Squads ==
Barbados	Guyana	Jamaica	Leeward Islands	Trinidad and Tobago	Windward Islands
Aaliyah Alleyne (c); Elecia Bowman; Shanika Bruce; Asabi Callender; Shamilia Connell; Naijanni Cumberbatch; Erin Deane; Keila Elliott; Allison Gordon; Theanny Herbert-Mayers; Trishan Holder; Kycia Knight; Kyshona Knight; Alisa Scantlebury	Shemaine Campbelle (c); Cherry-Ann Fraser; Shabika Gajnabi; Realeanna Grimmond; Sheneta Grimmond; Trisha Hardat; Nyia Latchman; Mandy Mangru; Katana Mentore; Plafianna Millington; Ashmini Munisar; Kaysia Schultz; Yonette Welcome; Laurene Williams	Rashada Williams (c); Abigail Bryce; Nicole Campbell; Corrine Howell; Chrishana McKenzie; Jodian Morgan; Chedean Nation; Roshana Outar; Lena Scott; Stafanie Taylor; Neisha-Ann Waisome; Vanessa Watts; Celina Whyte; Kade Wilmott	Amanda Edwards (c); Kimberly Anthony; Reniece Boyce; Kayzg Boyles; Melicia Clarke; Jahzara Claxton; Shawnisha Hector; Qiana Joseph; Sainavi Kambalapalli; Rozel Liburd; Tonya Martin; Davronique Maynard; Chey-Anne Moses; Divya Saxena	Karishma Ramharack (c); Kirbyina Alexander; Britney Cooper; Caneisha Isaac; Djenaba Joseph; Ameila Khan; Lee-Ann Kirby; Anisa Mohammed; Nadia Mohammed; Kamara Ragoobar; Amrita Ramtahal; Samara Ramnath; Shunelle Sawh; Steffi Soogrim	Zaida James (c); Holly Charles; Nerissa Crafton; Ashlene Edward; Pearl Etienne; Afy Fletcher; Earnisha Fontaine; Amiah Gilbert; Jannillea Glasgow; Japhina Joseph; Carena Noel; Selena Ross; Crisa Smith; Abini St Jean

== Points table ==
Pos	Team	Pld	W	L	NR	Pts	NRR	Qualification
1	Barbados (R)	5	4	1	0	35	0.612	Advanced to the final
2	Trinidad and Tobago (C)	5	3	1	1	32	0.974	Advanced to the final
3	Guyana	5	3	1	1	28	1.039	Advanced to the 3rd place playoff
4	Jamaica	5	1	3	1	18	−0.060	Advanced to the 3rd place playoff
5	Windward Islands	5	1	3	1	18	−0.803	Advanced to the 5th place playoff
6	Leeward Islands	5	1	4	0	14	−1.755	Advanced to the 5th place playoff

Source: FanCode
(C) Champions; (R) Runners-up

=== Match summary ===
Visitor team →	BAR	GUY	JAM	LEE	TTO	WWI
Home team ↓	BAR	GUY	JAM	LEE	TTO	WWI
Barbados		Barbados; 11 runs		Barbados; 9 wickets	Trinidad and Tobago; 5 wickets	
Guyana					Match abandoned	Guyana; 7 wickets
Jamaica	Barbados; 54 runs	Guyana; 8 wickets			Jamaica; 51 runs	
Leeward Islands		Guyana; 122 runs	Leeward Islands; 1 wicket			
Trinidad and Tobago				Trinidad and Tobago; 4 wickets		Trinidad and Tobago; 9 wickets
Windward Islands	Barbados; 56 runs		Match abandoned	Windward Islands; 8 wickets		

Home team won	Visitor team won

- Note: Results listed are according to the home (horizontal) and visitor (vertical) teams.
- Note: Click on a result to see a summary of the match.

== Fixtures ==
In February 2025, CWI announced the fixtures for the tournament.

Match 1
24 February 2025
10:00
Scorecard

Barbados; 183/5 (50 overs)	v	Guyana; 172 (47.4 overs)
Aaliyah Alleyne 57* (55); Sheneta Grimmond 2/17 (10 overs)		Cherry-Ann Fraser 26 (31); Erin Deane 3/33 (10 overs)

Barbados won by 11 runs
Conaree Sports Club, Basseterre
Umpires: Carolyn Brown and Vicki Daniel

- Barbados won the toss and elected to bat.

Match 2
24 February 2025
10:00
Scorecard

Jamaica; 223 (49.5 overs)	v	Trinidad and Tobago; 172 (46.4 overs)
Rashada Williams 51 (85); Anisa Mohammed 3/40 (9.5 overs)		Steffie Soogrim 34 (31); Vanessa Watts 3/34 (9.4 overs)

Jamaica won by 51 runs
Warner Park Sporting Complex, Basseterre
Umpires: Maria Abbott and Javed Persaud

- Jamaica won the toss and elected to bat.

Match 3
24 February 2025
10:00
Scorecard

Leeward Islands; 93 (28 overs)	v	Windward Islands; 94/2 (13.5 overs)
Reniece Boyce 24 (37); Afy Fletcher 5/15 (7 overs)		Jannillea Glasgow 55* (44); Jahzara Claxton 1/20 (4 overs)

Windward Islands won by 8 wickets
St Paul's Sports Complex, Basseterre
Umpires: Colin Bryan and Jacqueline Williams

- Windward Islands won the toss and elected to field.

Match 4
26 February 2025
10:00
Scorecard

Jamaica; 175 (47.4 overs)	v	Guyana; 178/2 (47.1 overs)
Neisha-Ann Waisome 29 (41); Plaffiana Millington 3/16 (10 overs)		Realeanna Grimmond 72* (131); Jodian Morgan 1/38 (10 overs)

Guyana won by 8 wickets
St Paul's Sports Complex, Basseterre
Umpires: Vicki Daniel and Candace la Borde

- Jamaica won the toss and elected to bat.

Match 5
26 February 2025
10:00
Scorecard

Leeward Islands; 188 (45.3 overa)	v	Trinidad and Tobago; 190/6 (47.3 overs)
Reniece Boyce 76 (84); Amrita Ramtahal 4/27 (6 overs)		Britney Cooper 72 (107); Jahzara Claxton 2/29 (9 overs)

Trinidad and Tobago won by 4 wickets
Conaree Sports Club, Basseterre
Umpires: Ayana Holder and Imran Moakan

- Leeward Islands won the toss and elected to bat.

Match 6
26 February 2025
10:00
Scorecard

Barbados; 181 (43.3 overs)	v	Windward Islands; 125 (30.5 overs)
Kycia Knight 63 (91); Pearl Etienne 2/22 (4.3 overs)		Ashlene Edward 31 (30); Naijanni Cumberbatch 3/20 (4 overs)

Barbados won by 56 runs
Warner Park Sporting Complex, Basseterre
Umpires: Melissa Lawrie and Jacqueline Williams

- Windward Islands won the toss and elected to field.

Match 7
28 February 2025
10:00
Scorecard

Barbados; 199/6 (50 overs)	v	Jamaica; 145 (44.3 overs)
Asabi Callender 54 (100); Vanessa Watts 2/32 (10 overs)		Rashada Williams 48 (86); Keila Elliott 4/27 (10 overs)

Barbados won by 54 runs
Conaree Sports Club, Basseterre
Umpires: Maria Abbott and Melissa Lawrie

- Barbados won the toss and elected to bat.

Match 8
28 February 2025
10:00
Scorecard

Guyana; 178 (43.5 overs)	v	Leeward Islands; 56 (24.1 overs)
Shemaine Campbelle 77* (97); Kimberly Anthony 3/20 (5.5 overs)		Amanda Edwards 13* (45); Ashmini Munisar (6.1 overs)

Guyana won by 122 runs
Warner Park Sporting Complex, Basseterre
Umpires: Carolyn Brown and Candace la Borde

- Leeward Islands won the toss and elected to field.

Match 9
28 February 2025
10:00
Scorecard

Windward Islands; 70 (33.3 overs)	v	Trinidad and Tobago; 71/1 (16.1 overs)
Jannillea Glasgow 13 (19); Samara Ramnath 5/13 (8 overs)		Djenaba Joseph 35* (43); Afy Fletcher 1/14 (4.1 overs)

Trinidad and Tobago won by 9 wickets
St Paul's Sports Complex, Basseterre
Umpires: Ayana Holder and Javed Persaud

- Trinidad and Tobago won the toss and elected to field.

Match 10
3 March 2025
10:00
Scorecard

Barbados; 76 (40.5 overs)	v	Trinidad and Tobago; 77/5 (22 overs)
Kyshona Knight 23 (61); Anisa Mohammed 3/12 (10 overs)		Djenaba Joseph 27* (54); Theanny Herbert-Mayers 2/15 (6 overs)

Trinidad and Tobago won by 5 wickets
St Paul's Sports Complex, Basseterre
Umpires: Ryan Banwarie and Imran Mookan

- Trinidad and Tobago won the toss and elected to field.

Match 11
3 March 2025
10:00
Scorecard

Windward Islands; 97 (38.1 overs)	v	Guyana; 101/3 (25 overs)
Holly Charles 17 (34); Plaffiana Millington 3/27 (10 overs)		Realeanna Grimmond 48* (71); Selena Ross 2/17 (5 overs)

Guyana won by 7 wickets
Conaree Sports Club, Basseterre
Umpires: Carolyn Brown and Colin Bryan

- Guyana won the toss and elected to field.

Match 12
3 March 2025
10:00
Scorecard

Jamaica; 253/9 (50 overs)	v	Leeward Islands; 257/9 (49.3 overs)
Rashada Williams 86 (114); Kimberly Anthony 5/34 (6 overs)		Amanda Edwards 88* (101); Chedean Nation 2/36 (7.3 overs)

Leeward Islands won by 1 wicket
Warner Park Sporting Complex, Basseterre
Umpires: Gregory Brathwaite and Ayana Holder

- Leeward Islands won the toss and elected to field.

Match 13
5 March 2025
10:00
Scorecard

Leeward Islands; 85 (31.2 overs)	v	Barbados; 87/1 (17.5 overs)
Jahzara Claxton 23* (37); Allison Gordon 4/12 (6 overs)		Kycia Knight 51* (64); Sainavi Kambalapalli 1/39 (8.5 overs)

Barbados won by 9 wickets
St Paul's Sports Complex, Basseterre
Umpires: Vicki Daniel and Imran Mookan

- Barbados won the toss and elected to field.

Match 14
5 March 2025
10:00
Scorecard

Guyana; 108 (45.2 overs)	v	Trinidad and Tobago; 16/2 (8 overs)
Shabika Gajnabi 51 (96); Karishma Ramharack 3/14 (9.2 overs)		Djenaba Joseph 9 (21); Cherry-Ann Fraser 1/4 (4 overs)

No result
Warner Park Sporting Complex, Basseterre
Umpires: Colin Bryan and Afron Byam

- Trinidad and Tobago won the toss and elected to field.
- The match was reduced to 47 overs per side due to rain.
- Rain prevented any further play.

Match 15
5 March 2025
10:00
Scorecard

Windward Islands; 95/3 (20 overs)	v	Jamaica
Jannillea Glasgow 41* (59); Vanessa Watts 1/17 (5 overs)

No result
Conaree Sports Club, Basseterre
Umpires: Melissa Lawrie and Javed Persaud

- Jamaica won the toss and elected to field.
- The match was reduced to 30 overs per side due to rain.
- Rain prevented any further play.

== Play-offs ==
5th place playoff
7 March 2025
10:00
Scorecard

Windward Islands; 130 (34.2 overs)	v	Leeward Islands; 59 (21.1 overs)
Jannillea Glasgow 50 (82); Davronique Maynard 4/20 (9 overs)		Shawnisha Hector 24 (24); Afy Fletcher 5/12 (7 overs)

Windward Islands won by 71 runs
St Paul's Sports Complex, Basseterre
Umpires: Ryan Banwarie and Vicki Daniel

- Leeward Islands won the toss and elected to field.

3rd place playoff
7 March 2025
10:00
Scorecard

Guyana; 182/8 (50 overs)	v	Jamaica; 100 (31.2 overs)
Realeanna Grimmond 71 (126); Neisha-Ann Waisome 3/25 (8 overs)		Rashada Williams 27 (39); Nyia Latchman 4/15 (5.2 overs)

Guyana won by 82 runs
Conaree Sports Club, Basseterre
Umpires: Gregory Brathwaite and Afron Byam

- Jamaica won the toss and elected to field.

Final
7 March 2025
10:00
Scorecard

Barbados; 71 (29 overs)	v	Trinidad and Tobago; 75/3 (23.2 overs)
Asabi Callender 28 (64); Anisa Mohammed 3/17 (7 overs)		Djenaba Joseph 28 (63); Shamilia Connell 2/15 (10 overs)

Trinidad and Tobago won by 7 wickets
Warner Park Sporting Complex, Basseterre
Umpires: Carolyn Brown and Javed Persaud

- Trinidad and Tobago won the toss and elected to field.
