= 2019 Twenty20 Blaze =

Cricket tournament

- Dates: 28 March – 3 April 2019
- Administrator(s): Cricket West Indies
- Cricket format: Twenty20
- Tournament format(s): Round robin
- Champions: Barbados (2nd title)
- Participants: 6
- Matches: 15
- Most runs: Deandra Dottin (222)
- Most wickets: Hayley Matthews (11)

The 2019 Twenty20 Blaze was the fifth season of the women's Twenty20 cricket competition played in the West Indies. It ran from March to April 2019, with 6 teams taking part and all matches taking place at Providence Stadium in Guyana. Barbados won the tournament, winning all five of their matches to claim their second T20 title.

The tournament followed the 2018–19 Women's Super50 Cup.

== Competition format ==
Teams played in a round-robin in a group of six, therefore playing 5 matches overall. Matches were played using a Twenty20 format. The top team in the group were crowned the Champions.

The group worked on a points system with positions being based on the total points. Points were awarded as follows:

Win: 3 points
Loss: 0 points.
Abandoned/No Result: 2 points.

== Points table ==
Team	Pld	W	L	T	NR	A	Pts	NRR
Barbados (C)	5	5	0	0	0	0	15	2.484
Jamaica	5	3	2	0	0	0	9	0.988
Trinidad and Tobago	5	3	2	0	0	0	9	0.814
Guyana	5	3	2	0	0	0	9	0.260
Windward Islands	5	1	4	0	0	0	3	–1.003
Leeward Islands	5	0	5	0	0	0	0	–3.534

Source: Windies Cricket

== Fixtures ==
28 March 2019
Scorecard

Barbados; 206/6 (20 overs)	v	Leeward Islands; 107/5 (20 overs)
Deandra Dottin 63 (23); Amanda Edwards 2/24 (4 overs)		Shebani Bhaskar 40* (41); Hayley Matthews 2/21 (4 overs)

Barbados won by 99 runs
Providence Stadium, Providence, Guyana
Umpires: Imran Moakan and Javed Persaud

- Barbados won the toss and elected to bat.

28 March 2019
Scorecard

Guyana; 157/4 (20 overs)	v	Trinidad and Tobago; 161/5 (18.4 overs)
Shemaine Campbelle 77* (54); Anisa Mohammed 2/23 (4 overs)		Stacy-Ann King 59 (48); Mandy Mangru 1/6 (2 overs)

Trinidad and Tobago won by 5 wickets
Providence Stadium, Providence, Guyana
Umpires: Nandkumar Shivsankar and Ryan Willoughby

- Guyana won the toss and elected to bat.

28 March 2019
Scorecard

Jamaica; 185/2 (20 overs)	v	Windward Islands; 123/8 (20 overs)
Jodi-Ann Morgan 72* (58); Pearl Etienne 2/33 (4 overs)		Juliana Nero 60 (50); Chinelle Henry 2/20 (4 overs)

Jamaica won by 62 runs
Providence Stadium, Providence, Guyana
Umpires: Brian Joseph and Kellman Kowlessar

- Jamaica won the toss and elected to bat.

29 March 2019
Scorecard

Guyana; 146/7 (20 overs)	v	Leeward Islands; 123 (20 overs)
Shemaine Campbelle 31 (31); Davanna Claxton 2/17 (2 overs)		Rozel Liburd 41 (34); Erva Giddings 3/11 (4 overs)

Guyana won by 23 runs
Providence Stadium, Providence, Guyana
Umpires: Imran Moakan and Nandkumar Shivsankar

- Guyana won the toss and elected to bat.

29 March 2019
Scorecard

Windward Islands; 59/3 (9.4 overs)	v	Trinidad and Tobago; 58/3 (7.5 overs)
Juliana Nero 19* (20); Felicia Walters 2/15 (2.4 overs)		Stacy-Ann King 25 (17); Afy Fletcher 1/10 (2 overs)

Trinidad and Tobago won by 7 wickets (DLS)
Providence Stadium, Providence, Guyana
Umpires: Brian Joseph and Ryan Willoughby

- Windward Islands won the toss and elected to bat.
- Match reduced due to rain

29 March 2019
Scorecard

Jamaica; 95 (17.2 overs)	v	Barbados; 96/1 (11.3 overs)
Rashada Williams 28* (32); Shanika Bruce 4/16 (4 overs)		Hayley Matthews 58* (40); Stafanie Taylor 1/19 (3 overs)

Barbados won by 9 wickets
Providence Stadium, Providence, Guyana
Umpires: Kellman Kowlessar and Javed Persaud

- Barbados won the toss and elected to field.

31 March 2019
Scorecard

Guyana; 114/8 (20 overs)	v	Jamaica; 94 (18.4 overs)
Tremayne Smartt 44 (36); Chedean Nation 3/14 (4 overs)		Stafanie Taylor 48 (57); Erva Giddings 3/13 (4 overs)

Guyana won by 20 runs
Providence Stadium, Providence, Guyana
Umpires: Brian Joseph and Kellman Kowlessar

- Jamaica won the toss and elected to field.

31 March 2019
Scorecard

Windward Islands; 131/4 (20 overs)	v	Barbados; 133/3 (18.5 overs)
Juliana Nero 26* (26); Hayley Matthews 3/18 (4 overs)		Hayley Matthews 45 (27); Nerissa Crafton 2/22 (4 overs)

Barbados won by 7 wickets
Providence Stadium, Providence, Guyana
Umpires: Imran Moakan and Nandkumar Shivsankar

- Windward Islands won the toss and elected to bat.

31 March 2019
Scorecard

Leeward Islands; 66 (18 overs)	v	Trinidad and Tobago; 70/1 (7.3 overs)
Amanda Edwards 19 (18); Leandra Ramdeen 2/7 (3 overs)		Stacy-Ann King 43* (25); Rozel Liburd 1/19 (2.3 overs)

Trinidad and Tobago won by 9 wickets
Providence Stadium, Providence, Guyana
Umpires: Javed Persaud and Ryan Willoughby

- Leeward Islands won the toss and elected to bat.

2 April 2019
Scorecard

Trinidad and Tobago; 136/6 (20 overs)	v	Barbados; 137/3 (15.3 overs)
Britney Cooper 31 (24); Deandra Dottin 2/9 (4 overs)		Deandra Dottin 52* (32); Lee-Ann Kirby 1/14 (1.3 overs)

Barbados won by 7 wickets
Providence Stadium, Providence, Guyana
Umpires: Imran Moakan and Nandkumar Shivsankar

- Barbados won the toss and elected to field.

2 April 2019
Scorecard

Leeward Islands; 61 (18.4 overs)	v	Jamaica; 67/0 (6.4 overs)
Terez Parker 18* (20); Neisha-Ann Waisome 3/10 (4 overs)		Jodi-Ann Morgan 30* (24)

Jamaica won by 10 wickets
Providence Stadium, Providence, Guyana
Umpires: Javed Persaud and Ryan Willoughby

- Leeward Islands won the toss and elected to bat.

2 April 2019
Scorecard

Guyana; 105/8 (20 overs)	v	Windward Islands; 87/8 (20 overs)
Tremayne Smartt 40 (43); Swayline Williams 2/21 (4 overs)		Nerissa Crafton 22 (22); Erva Giddings 3/16 (4 overs)

Guyana won by 18 runs
Providence Stadium, Providence, Guyana
Umpires: Brian Joseph and Kellman Kowlessar

- Windward Islands won the toss and elected to field.

3 April 2019
Scorecard

Trinidad and Tobago; 145/6 (20 overs)	v	Jamaica; 146/3 (18.4 overs)
Britney Cooper 30 (27); Karla Cohen 1/21 (1.4 overs)		Chedean Nation 63* (48); Karishma Ramharack 1/21 (4 overs)

Jamaica won by 7 wickets
Providence Stadium, Providence, Guyana
Umpires: Javed Persaud and Nandkumar Shivsankar

- Jamaica won the toss and elected to field.

3 April 2019
Scorecard

Windward Islands; 115/8 (20 overs)	v	Leeward Islands; 104/9 (20 overs)
Afy Fletcher 24 (19); Amanda Edwards 2/21 (3 overs)		Saneldo Willett 25 (25); Pearl Etienne 3/14 (4 overs)

Windward Islands won by 11 runs
Providence Stadium, Providence, Guyana
Umpires: Brian Joseph and Ryan Willoughby

- Windward Islands won the toss and elected to bat.

3 April 2019
Scorecard

Guyana; 85/7 (20 overs)	v	Barbados; 86/2 (16.1 overs)
Shemaine Campbell 18 (28); Hayley Matthews 2/13 (4 overs)		Deandra Dottin 43* (28); Erva Giddings 1/11 (3 overs)

Barbados won by 8 wickets
Providence Stadium, Providence, Guyana
Umpires: Kellman Kowlessar and Imran Moakan

- Guyana won the toss and elected to bat.

== Statistics ==
=== Most runs ===
Player	Team	Matches	Innings	Runs	Average	HS	100s	50s
Deandra Dottin	Barbados	5	5	222	222.00	63	0	2
Stacy-Ann King	Trinidad and Tobago	5	5	183	45.75	59	0	1
Shemaine Campbelle	Guyana	5	5	165	41.25	77*	0	1
Hayley Matthews	Barbados	5	5	163	40.75	58*	0	1
Britney Cooper	Trinidad and Tobago	4	4	133	66.50	52*	0	1

Source: CricketArchive

=== Most wickets ===
Player	Team	Overs	Wickets	Average	BBI	5w
Hayley Matthews	Barbados	20.0	11	10.54	4/25	0
Erva Giddings	Guyana	17.0	10	7.80	3/11	0
Vanessa Watts	Jamaica	19.0	7	11.71	3/17	0
Sheneta Grimmond	Guyana	18.0	7	12.57	3/20	0
Akaze Thompson	Guyana	14.5	6	13.66	3/16	0

Source: CricketArchive
