= 2018–19 Women's Super50 Cup =

Women's cricket tournament in Guyana

- Dates: 17 March – 25 March 2019
- Administrator(s): Cricket West Indies
- Cricket format: 50 over
- Tournament format(s): Round robin
- Champions: Barbados (3rd title)
- Participants: 6
- Matches: 15
- Most runs: Deandra Dottin (299)
- Most wickets: Hayley Matthews (17)

The 2018–19 Women's Super50 Cup was a 50-over women's cricket competition that took place in the West Indies. It took place in March 2019, with 6 teams taking part and all matches taking place in Guyana. Barbados won the tournament, winning all five of their matches to claim their third 50-over title in five seasons.

The tournament was followed by the 2018–19 Twenty20 Blaze.

== Competition format ==
Teams played in a round-robin in a group of six, therefore playing 5 matches overall. Matches were played using a one day format with 50 overs per side. The top team in the group were crowned the Champions.

The group worked on a points system with positions being based on the total points. Points were awarded as follows:

Win: 4 points
Tie: 2 points
Loss: 0 points.
Abandoned/No Result: 2 points.
Bonus Point: 1 bonus point available per match.

== Points table ==
Team	Pld	W	L	T	NR	A	BP	Pts	NRR
Barbados (C)	5	5	0	0	0	0	4	24	2.986
Trinidad and Tobago	5	4	1	0	0	0	3	19	1.248
Jamaica	5	3	2	0	0	0	2	14	0.514
Guyana	5	2	3	0	0	0	2	10	0.038
Windward Islands	5	1	4	0	0	0	1	5	–1.283
Leeward Islands	5	0	5	0	0	0	0	0	–3.575

Source: Windies Cricket

== Fixtures ==
17 March 2019
Scorecard

Leeward Islands; 88 (27.4 overs)	v	Barbados; 89/3 (12.1 overs)
Rozel Liburd 25 (25); Hayley Matthews 7/27 (8.4 overs)		Deandra Dottin 34* (12); Rozel Liburd 2/23 (4 overs)

Barbados won by 7 wickets
Everest Cricket Club Ground, Georgetown
Umpires: Ryan Banwarie and Nandkumar Shivsankar

- Leeward Islands won the toss and elected to bat.
- Points: Barbados 5, Leeward Islands 0

17 March 2019
Scorecard

Trinidad and Tobago; 221/7 (50 overs)	v	Guyana; 152 (46.4 overs)
Reniece Boyce 65* (90); Erva Giddings 2/34 (10 overs)		Shemaine Campbelle 45 (77); Felicia Walters 3/22 (10 overs)

Trinidad and Tobago won by 69 runs
Providence Stadium, Providence
Umpires: Kellman Kowlessar and Ryan Willoughby

- Guyana won the toss and elected to field.
- Points: Trinidad and Tobago 5, Guyana 0

17 March 2019
Scorecard

Jamaica; 236/8 (50 overs)	v	Windward Islands; 156 (46.3 overs)
Chinelle Henry 54 (40); Afy Fletcher 3/34 (10 overs)		Pearl Etienne 47* (51); Vanessa Watts 4/25 (10 overs)

Jamaica won by 80 runs
Bourda, Georgetown

- Windward Islands won the toss and elected to field.
- Points: Jamaica 5, Windward Islands 0

19 March 2019
Scorecard

Barbados; 334/3 (50 overs)	v	Windward Islands; 93 (28.3 overs)
Deandra Dottin 94* (50); Qiana Joseph 2/42 (8 overs)		Afy Fletcher 24* (45); Shamilia Connell 3/36 (10 overs)

Barbados won by 241 runs
Providence Stadium, Providence
Umpires: Javed Persaud and Nandkumar Shivsankar

- Windward Islands won the toss and elected to field.
- Points: Barbados 5, Windward Islands 0

19 March 2019
Scorecard

Guyana; 242 (49.5 overs)	v	Jamaica; 244/4 (46.4 overs)
Shemaine Campbelle 111 (118); Stafanie Taylor 3/44 (10 overs)		Stafanie Taylor 119 (118); Erva Giddings 3/39 (10 overs)

Jamaica won by 6 wickets
Everest Cricket Club Ground, Georgetown

- Guyana won the toss and elected to bat.
- Points: Jamaica 4, Guyana 0

19 March 2019
Scorecard

Leeward Islands; 76 (25.1 overs)	v	Trinidad and Tobago; 79/4 (17 overs)
Shebani Bhaskar 26 (54); Leandra Ramdeen 4/12 (6.1 overs)		Felicia Walters 32* (50); Jenison Richards 1/11 (4 overs)

Trinidad and Tobago won by 6 wickets
Bourda, Georgetown
Umpires: Imran Moakan and Ryan Willoughby

- Leeward Islands won the toss and elected to bat.
- Points: Trinidad and Tobago 5, Leeward Islands 0

21 March 2019
Scorecard

Jamaica; 214/7 (50 overs)	v	Barbados; 219/2 (35.3 overs)
Stafanie Taylor 80 (117); Shanika Bruce 2/32 (6 overs)		Hayley Matthews 108 (101); Chedean Nation 1/54 (6 overs)

Barbados won by 8 wickets
Bourda, Georgetown
Umpires: Brian Joseph and Javed Persaud

- Jamaica won the toss and elected to bat.
- Points: Barbados 5, Jamaica 0

21 March 2019
Scorecard

Guyana; 240/9 (50 overs)	v	Leeward Islands; 109 (34.5 overs)
Shabika Gajnabi 78 (78); Saneldo Willett 3/30 (5 overs)		Malissa Haward 21 (17); Mandy Mangru 4/22 (6.5 overs)

Guyana won by 131 runs
Enmore Recreation Ground, Enmore
Umpires: Kellman Kowlessar and Ryan Willoughby

- Leeward Islands won the toss and elected to field.
- Points: Guyana 5, Leeward Islands 0

21 March 2019
Scorecard

Trinidad and Tobago; 257/5 (50 overs)	v	Windward Islands; 206/6 (50 overs)
Stacy-Ann King 79* (129); Pearl Etienne 2/46 (10 overs)		Afy Fletcher 57* (62); Karishma Ramharack 2/31 (10 overs)

Trinidad and Tobago won by 51 runs
Everest Cricket Club Ground, Georgetown

- Trinidad and Tobago won the toss and elected to bat.
- Points: Trinidad and Tobago 4, Windward Islands 0

23 March 2019
Scorecard

Guyana; 159 (42.3 overs)	v	Barbados; 164/5 (25.2 overs)
Shemaine Campbelle 40 (65); Hayley Matthews 4/25 (10 overs)		Deandra Dottin 75* (55); Sheneta Grimmond 2/23 (5 overs)

Barbados won by 5 wickets
Providence Stadium, Providence

- Barbados won the toss and elected to field.
- Points: Barbados 5, Guyana 0

23 March 2019
Scorecard

Jamaica; 115 (29.5 overs)	v	Trinidad and Tobago; 118/6 (34.3 overs)
Tameka Stanford 24 (33); Leandra Ramdeen 4/35 (8.5 overs)		Lee-Ann Kirby 39* (49); Chinelle Henry 3/18 (9 overs)

Trinidad and Tobago won by 4 wickets
Everest Cricket Club Ground, Georgetown
Umpires: Nandkumar Shivsankar and Ryan Willoughby

- Trinidad and Tobago won the toss and elected to field.
- Points: Trinidad and Tobago 5, Jamaica 0

23 March 2019
Scorecard

Leeward Islands; 50 (17.3 overs)	v	Windward Islands; 54/3 (12.1 overs)
Amanda Edwards 11 (22); Swayline Williams 3/13 (3.3 overs)		Juliana Nero 30* (34); Melicia Clarke 2/22 (4 overs)

Windward Islands won by 7 wickets
Enmore Recreation Ground, Enmore
Umpires: Imran Moakan and Javed Persaud

- Leeward Islands won the toss and elected to bat.
- Points: Windward Islands 5, Leeward Islands 0

25 March 2019
Scorecard

Barbados; 242/7 (50 overs)	v	Trinidad and Tobago; 214 (47.5 overs)
Kycia Knight 77 (88); Karishma Ramharack 4/37 (10 overs)		Reniece Boyce 39 (38); Deandra Dottin 6/43 (8.5 overs)

Barbados won by 28 runs
Enmore Recreation Ground, Enmore

- Trinidad and Tobago won the toss and elected to field.
- Points: Barbados 4, Trinidad and Tobago 0

25 March 2019
Scorecard

Guyana; 132 (47 overs)	v	Windward Islands; 75 (33.2 overs)
Erva Giddings 39* (38); Afy Fletcher 3/19 (10 overs)		Afy Fletcher 26 (44); Sheneta Grimmond 4/23 (7.2 overs)

Guyana won by 57 runs
Bourda, Georgetown
Umpires: Kellman Kowlessar and Ryan Willoughby

- Windward Islands won the toss and elected to field.
- Points: Guyana 5, Windward Islands 0

25 March 2019
Scorecard

Leeward Islands; 91 (35.4 overs)	v	Jamaica; 96/2 (15.2 overs)
Saneldo Willett 23 (79); Stafanie Taylor 4/9 (6.4 overs)		Chedean Nation 53* (35); Amanda Edwards 2/32 (5 overs)

Jamaica won by 8 wickets
Providence Stadium, Providence
Umpires: Javed Persaud and Nandkumar Shivsankar

- Leeward Islands won the toss and elected to bat.
- Points: Jamaica 5, Leeward Islands 0

== Statistics ==
=== Most runs ===
Player	Team	Matches	Innings	Runs	Average	HS	100s	50s
Deandra Dottin	Barbados	5	5	299	299.00	94*	0	3
Kycia Knight	Barbados	5	5	264	88.00	81	0	3
Stafanie Taylor	Jamaica	5	5	263	65.75	119	1	1
Hayley Matthews	Barbados	5	5	233	46.60	108	1	1
Shemaine Campbelle	Guyana	5	5	211	66.56	111	1	0

Source: CricketArchive

=== Most wickets ===
Player	Team	Overs	Wickets	Average	BBI	5w
Hayley Matthews	Barbados	44.4	17	8.11	7/27	1
Karishma Ramharack	Trinidad and Tobago	42.0	13	9.76	4/37	0
Leandra Ramdeen	Trinidad and Tobago	34.0	10	13.20	4/12	0
Erva Giddings	Guyana	42.0	10	14.80	3/39	0
Afy Fletcher	Windward Islands	44.0	10	15.90	3/16	0

Source: CricketArchive
