= 2022 Women's Super50 Cup =

Cricket tournament

- Dates: 16 – 25 June 2022
- Administrator(s): Cricket West Indies
- Cricket format: 50 over
- Tournament format(s): Group stage and knockout
- Champions: Barbados (4th title)
- Participants: 6
- Matches: 10
- Most runs: Hayley Matthews (187)
- Most wickets: Vanessa Watts (9); Chinelle Henry (9)

The 2022 Women's Super50 Cup, known for sponsorship reasons as the CG Insurance Super50 Cup, was a women's 50-over cricket competition played in the West Indies. It took place from 16 to 25 June, with 6 teams taking part and all matches taking place in Guyana. Barbados won their third title in a row, defeating Jamaica in the final. The tournament followed the 2022 Twenty20 Blaze.

== Competition format ==
The six teams were divided into two groups of three, playing each other team in their group once. The top two in each group advanced to the semi-finals. The bottom team in each group played off in the 5th-place play-off. Matches were played using a one day format with 50 overs per side.

The groups worked on a points system with positions being based on the total points. Points were awarded as follows:

Win: 4 points
Tie: 2 points
Loss: 0 points.
Abandoned/No Result: 2 points.

== Standings ==
=== Group A ===
Team	Pld	W	L	T	NR	A	Pts	NRR
Barbados (Q)	2	2	0	0	0	0	8	+2.119
Jamaica (Q)	2	1	1	0	0	0	4	+0.526
Windward Islands	2	0	2	0	0	0	0	–2.327

=== Group B ===
Team	Pld	W	L	T	NR	A	Pts	NRR
Guyana (Q)	2	1	0	0	0	1	6	+3.790
Trinidad and Tobago (Q)	2	1	0	0	0	1	6	+1.189
Leeward Islands	2	0	2	0	0	0	0	–2.183

Source: Windies Cricket

== Fixtures ==
Source: Windies Cricket

=== Group A ===
16 June 2022
Scorecard

Barbados; 227/2 (50 overs)	v	Windward Islands; 78 (23.1 overs)
Hayley Matthews 99 (133); Pearl Etienne 1/25 (10 overs)		Japhina Joseph 18 (28); Shanika Bruce 4/48 (9 overs)

Barbados won by 149 runs
Providence Stadium, Providence, Guyana

18 June 2022
Scorecard

Barbados; 121 (31.4 overs)	v	Jamaica; 106/9 (25.3 overs)
Kyshona Knight 50 (75); Stafanie Taylor 3/13 (5.4 overs)		Rashada Williams 29 (41); Hayley Matthews 3/16 (7 overs)

Barbados won by 11 runs (DLS)
Providence Stadium, Providence, Guyana

- Jamaica innings ended at 25.3 overs due to rain; DLS par score was 117.

20 June 2022
Scorecard

Windward Islands; 101/9 (33 overs)	v	Jamaica; 100/2 (23.2 overs)
Japhina Joseph 23* (57); Stafanie Taylor 3/22 (7 overs)		Rashada Williams 43* (69); Pearl Etienne 2/15 (5 overs)

Jamaica won by 8 wickets (DLS)
Providence Stadium, Providence, Guyana

- Match reduced to 39 overs per side due to rain.
- Windward Islands innings interrupted by rain at 20.3 overs; match further reduced to 30 overs per side.
- Jamaica target was 100 runs in 30 overs.

=== Group B ===
17 June 2022
Scorecard

Leeward Islands; 132/8 (50 overs)	v	Trinidad and Tobago; 134/2 (35 overs)
Shawnisha Hector 46 (60); Kirbyina Alexander 3/20 (10 overs)		Reniece Boyce 35 (56); Shawnisha Hector 1/21 (7 overs)

Trinidad and Tobago won by 8 wickets
Providence Stadium, Providence, Guyana

19 June 2022
Scorecard

Guyana	v	Trinidad and Tobago

Match Abandoned
Providence Stadium, Providence, Guyana

- No play possible due to rain.

21 June 2022
Scorecard

Leeward Islands; 76 (29.5 overs)	v	Guyana; 77/2 (14.3 overs)
Terez Parker 22 (64); Tremayne Smartt 4/12 (10 overs)		Shemaine Campbelle 30* (35); Shawnisha Hector 1/7 (3 overs)

Guyana won by 8 wickets
Providence Stadium, Providence, Guyana

=== Knockout stages ===
==== Semi-finals ====
22 June 2022
Scorecard

Trinidad and Tobago; 133 (31.2 overs)	v	Barbados; 137/1 (30.2 overs)
Lee-Ann Kirby 41 (74); Aaliyah Alleyne 4/31 (7 overs)		Hayley Matthews 50* (86); Leandra Ramdeen 1/21 (7 overs)

Barbados won by 9 wickets (DLS)
Providence Stadium, Providence, Guyana

- Trinidad and Tobago innings interrupted by rain at 2.4 overs; match reduced to 33 overs per side.
- Barbados target was 137 runs in 33 overs.

23 June 2022
Scorecard

Guyana; 23 (11.2 overs)	v	Jamaica; 27/2 (5.1 overs)
Shemaine Campbelle 5 (5); Vanessa Watts 5/5 (5.2 overs)		Rashada Williams 12 (11); Tremayne Smartt 1/10 (2.1 overs)

Jamaica won by 8 wickets
Providence Stadium, Providence, Guyana

- Match reduced to 38 overs per side due to rain.

==== 5th-place play-off ====
24 June 2022
Scorecard

Windward Islands; 241/8 (50 overs)	v	Leeward Islands; 90 (21.5 overs)
Carena Noel 72* (61); Amanda Edwards 3/30 (10 overs)		Shawnisha Hector 24 (20); Tracy Byron 3/32 (4.5 overs)

Windward Islands won by 151 runs
Providence Stadium, Providence, Guyana

==== Final ====
25 June 2022
Scorecard

Jamaica; 118/8 (26.0 overs)	v	Barbados; 120/2 (23.4 overs)
Stafanie Taylor 44 (57); Hayley Matthews 2/16 (6 overs)		Kycia Knight 60* (75); Corrine Howell 1/18 (6 overs)

Barbados won by 8 wickets (DLS)
Providence Stadium, Providence, Guyana

- Jamaica innings interrupted by rain at 2.0 and 6.0 overs; match reduced to 26 overs per side.
- Barbados target was 120 runs in 26 overs.

== Statistics ==
=== Most runs ===
Player	Team	Matches	Innings	Runs	Average	HS	100s	50s
Hayley Matthews	Barbados	4	4	187	62.33	99	0	2
Kycia Knight	Barbados	4	4	164	54.66	72	0	2
Kyshona Knight	Barbados	4	4	140	70.00	50	0	1
Carena Noel	Windward Islands	3	3	95	47.50	72*	0	1
Stafanie Taylor	Jamaica	4	4	93	46.50	44	0	0

Source: Windies Cricket

=== Most wickets ===
Player	Team	Overs	Wickets	Average	BBI	5w
Vanessa Watts	Jamaica	25.0	9	6.55	5/5	1
Chinelle Henry	Jamaica	24.0	9	9.33	5/18	1
Hayley Matthews	Barbados	23.0	8	7.12	3/16	0
Aaliyah Alleyne	Barbados	21.0	8	10.62	4/31	0
Stafanie Taylor	Jamaica	16.4	6	9.50	3/13	0

Source: Windies Cricket
