= 2022 Twenty20 Blaze =

Cricket tournament

- Dates: 7 – 14 June 2022
- Administrator(s): Cricket West Indies
- Cricket format: Twenty20
- Tournament format(s): Round robin
- Champions: Jamaica (3rd title)
- Participants: 6
- Matches: 15
- Most runs: Hayley Matthews (191)
- Most wickets: Shanika Bruce (9)

The 2022 Twenty20 Blaze was the sixth season of the women's Twenty20 cricket competition played in the West Indies. It took place from 7 to 14 June, with 6 teams taking part and all matches taking place at Providence Stadium in Guyana. Jamaica won the competition, their third, finishing ahead of defending champions Barbados on Net Run Rate. The tournament was followed by the 2022 Women's Super50 Cup.

== Competition format ==
Teams played in a round-robin in a group of six, therefore playing 5 matches overall. Matches were played using a Twenty20 format. The top team in the group was crowned the Champions.

The group worked on a points system with positions being based on the total points. Points were awarded as follows:

Win: 4 points
Loss: 0 points.
Abandoned/No Result: 2 points.

== Points table ==
Team	Pld	W	L	T	NR	A	Pts	NRR
Jamaica (C)	5	4	1	0	0	0	16	+2.171
Barbados	5	4	1	0	0	0	16	+1.428
Trinidad and Tobago	5	3	1	0	0	1	14	–0.275
Guyana	5	2	2	0	0	1	10	+0.945
Windward Islands	5	1	4	0	0	0	4	–0.728
Leeward Islands	5	0	5	0	0	0	0	–3.369

Source: Windies Cricket

== Fixtures ==
Source: Windies Cricket

7 June 2022
Scorecard

Leeward Islands; 56/7 (20 overs)	v	Windward Islands; 57/6 (17.1 overs)
Rosalie Dolabaille 21 (46); Pearl Etienne 2/8 (4 overs)		Kimone Homer 11 (29); Jenison Richards 3/7 (4 overs)

Windward Islands won by 4 wickets
Providence Stadium, Providence, Guyana

7 June 2022
Scorecard

Barbados; 86 (19.2 overs)	v	Guyana; 79/9 (20 overs)
Hayley Matthews 35 (44); Cherry-Ann Fraser 3/11 (3.2 overs)		Shemaine Campbelle 33 (38); Aaliyah Alleyne 3/18 (4 overs)

Barbados won by 7 runs
Providence Stadium, Providence, Guyana

7 June 2022
Scorecard

Jamaica; 133/6 (20 overs)	v	Trinidad and Tobago; 55 (13.3 overs)
Chinelle Henry 52 (38); Caniesha Isaac 2/21 (4 overs)		Kirbyina Alexander 12 (11); Neisha-Ann Waisome 5/8 (4 overs)

Jamaica won by 78 runs
Providence Stadium, Providence, Guyana

9 June 2022
Scorecard

Trinidad and Tobago	v	Guyana

Match Abandoned
Providence Stadium, Providence, Guyana

- No play possible due to rain.

9 June 2022
Scorecard

Leeward Islands; 60 (18.2 overs)	v	Barbados; 61/1 (6.4 overs)
Rosalie Dolabaille 14* (44); Hayley Matthews 3/9 (4 overs)		Hayley Matthews 23* (18); Tiffany Thorpe 1/16 (2 overs)

Barbados won by 9 wickets
Providence Stadium, Providence, Guyana

9 June 2022
Scorecard

Jamaica; 91 (19.3 overs)	v	Windward Islands; 66 (16.4 overs)
Rashada Williams 25 (42); Jannillea Glasgow 4/21 (3.3 overs)		Afy Fletcher 20 (24); Jodi-Ann Morgan 3/15 (2.4 overs)

Jamaica won by 25 runs
Providence Stadium, Providence, Guyana

11 June 2022
Scorecard

Windward Islands; 87/6 (20 overs)	v	Barbados; 89/0 (11.3 overs)
Afy Fletcher 30 (46); Shanika Bruce 3/13 (4 overs)		Hayley Matthews 41* (34)

Barbados won by 10 wickets
Providence Stadium, Providence, Guyana

11 June 2022
Scorecard

Guyana; 90/6 (20 overs)	v	Jamaica; 92/3 (17.5 overs)
Shabika Gajnabi 26* (30); Chinelle Henry 3/12 (4 overs)		Rashada Williams 41* (52); Tremayne Smartt 2/12 (4 overs)

Jamaica won by 7 wickets
Providence Stadium, Providence, Guyana

11 June 2022
Scorecard

Trinidad and Tobago; 108/7 (20 overs)	v	Leeward Islands; 72/6 (20 overs)
Lee-Ann Kirby 26 (25); Tiffany Thorpe 2/10 (4 overs)		Jenison Richards 24 (32); Karishma Ramharack 3/4 (4 overs)

Trinidad and Tobago won by 36 runs
Providence Stadium, Providence, Guyana

13 June 2022
Scorecard

Barbados; 129/4 (20 overs)	v	Jamaica; 104/6 (20 overs)
Hayley Matthews 74* (63); Corrine Howell 2/27 (4 overs)		Chedean Nation 26 (28); Aaliyah Alleyne 2/20 (4 overs)

Barbados won by 25 runs
Providence Stadium, Providence, Guyana

13 June 2022
Scorecard

Trinidad and Tobago; 88/8 (20 overs)	v	Windward Islands; 87/7 (20 overs)
Britney Cooper 47* (41); Qiana Joseph 3/10 (4 overs)		Zaida James 28* (35); Anisa Mohammed 2/16 (4 overs)

Trinidad and Tobago won by 1 run
Providence Stadium, Providence, Guyana

13 June 2022
Scorecard

Guyana; 122/4 (20 overs)	v	Leeward Islands; 47 (14.5 overs)
Shemaine Campbelle 36 (30); Amanda Edwards 2/25 (4 overs)		Terez Parker 11* (12); Kaysia Schultz 3/14 (4 overs)

Guyana won by 75 runs
Providence Stadium, Providence, Guyana

14 June 2022
Scorecard

Trinidad and Tobago; 108/7 (20 overs)	v	Barbados; 89/7 (20 overs)
Rachael Vincent 22* (21); Hayley Matthews 2/25 (4 overs)		Aaliyah Alleyne 26 (32); Kamara Ragoobar 2/16 (4 overs)

Trinidad and Tobago won by 19 runs
Providence Stadium, Providence, Guyana

14 June 2022
Scorecard

Jamaica; 170/5 (20 overs)	v	Leeward Islands; 46/3 (20 overs)
Natasha McLean 83 (54); Amanda Edwards 2/11 (2 overs)		Shawnisha Hector 17* (31); Chinelle Henry 1/3 (3 overs)

Jamaica won by 124 runs
Providence Stadium, Providence, Guyana

14 June 2022
Scorecard

Windward Islands; 85/7 (20 overs)	v	Guyana; 86/4 (16.3 overs)
Afy Fletcher 26 (31); Kaysia Schultz 3/13 (4 overs)		Shemaine Campbelle 29* (30); Pearl Etienne 1/10 (3 overs)

Guyana won by 6 wickets
Providence Stadium, Providence, Guyana

== Statistics ==
=== Most runs ===
Player	Team	Matches	Innings	Runs	Average	HS	100s	50s
Hayley Matthews	Barbados	5	5	191	95.50	74*	0	1
Natasha McLean	Jamaica	5	5	130	26.00	83	0	1
Stafanie Taylor	Jamaica	5	5	116	23.20	56	0	1
Shemaine Campbelle	Guyana	5	4	108	36.00	36	0	0
Chinelle Henry	Jamaica	5	5	97	24.25	52	0	1

Source: Windies Cricket

=== Most wickets ===
Player	Team	Overs	Wickets	Average	BBI	5w
Shanika Bruce	Barbados	20.0	9	8.66	3/13	0
Kaysia Schultz	Guyana	14.0	8	6.87	3/13	0
Aaliyah Alleyne	Barbados	20.0	8	10.00	3/18	0
Pearl Etienne	Windward Islands	16.0	7	9.85	2/8	0
Shakera Selman	Barbados	13.2	7	11.42	3/26	0

Source: Windies Cricket
