= 2018 Regional Women's Twenty20 Championship =

- Dates: 10 June – 18 June 2018
- Administrator(s): Cricket West Indies
- Cricket format: Twenty20
- Tournament format(s): Round robin
- Champions: Barbados (1st title)
- Participants: 6
- Matches: 15
- Most runs: Hayley Matthews (173)
- Most wickets: Chedean Nation (9); Vanessa Watts (9)

The 2018 Regional Women's Twenty20 Championship was the fourth season of the women's Twenty20 cricket competition played in the West Indies. It took place in June 2018, with six teams participating, mainly in Kingston. Barbados won the tournament, claiming their first T20 title.

The tournament was followed by the 2018 Women's Regional Super50.

== Competition format ==
Teams played in a round-robin in a group of six, therefore playing 5 matches overall. Matches were played using a Twenty20 format. The top team in the group were crowned the Champions.

The group worked on a points system with positions being based on the total points. Points were awarded as follows:

Win: 3 points
Loss: 0 points.
Abandoned/No Result: 2 points.

== Points table ==
Team	Pld	W	L	T	NR	A	Pts	NRR
Barbados (C)	5	4	1	0	0	0	12	1.398
Jamaica	5	4	1	0	0	0	12	0.556
Trinidad and Tobago	5	3	2	0	0	0	9	0.926
Guyana	5	2	3	0	0	0	6	0.360
Windward Islands	5	2	3	0	0	0	6	–0.174
Leeward Islands	5	0	5	0	0	0	0	–3.351

Source: Windies Cricket

== Statistics ==
=== Most runs ===
Player	Team	Matches	Innings	Runs	Average	HS	100s	50s
Hayley Matthews	Barbados	5	5	173	43.25	61	0	1
Shemaine Campbelle	Guyana	5	5	152	50.66	61	0	1
Juliana Nero	Windward Islands	5	5	132	26.40	44	0	0
Stafanie Taylor	Jamaica	5	4	109	36.33	38	0	0
Stacy-Ann King	Trinidad and Tobago	5	5	97	32.33	39	0	0

Source: CricketArchive

=== Most wickets ===
Player	Team	Overs	Wickets	Average	BBI	5w
Chedean Nation	Jamaica	19.0	9	11.00	4/20	0
Vanessa Watts	Jamaica	20.0	9	11.11	5/9	1
Erva Giddings	Guyana	16.0	8	6.87	4/18	0
Roshana Outar	Jamaica	16.0	8	9.25	3/12	0
Cordel Jack	Windward Islands	20.0	8	11.00	4/19	0

Source: CricketArchive
