= 2010 Women's World Twenty20 squads =

This is a list of the squads picked for the 2010 ICC Women's World Twenty20 tournament.

== Australia ==
- Alex Blackwell (captain)
- Shelley Nitschke
- Jess Cameron
- Sarah Elliott
- Rene Farrell
- Rachael Haynes
- Alyssa Healy (wk)
- Julie Hunter
- Erin Osborne
- Ellyse Perry
- Leah Poulton
- Clea Smith
- Lisa Sthalekar
- Elyse Villani
- Jodie Fields (withdrawn)

== England ==
- Charlotte Edwards (captain)
- Katherine Brunt
- Holly Colvin
- Lydia Greenway
- Jenny Gunn
- Danielle Hazell
- Heather Knight
- Laura Marsh
- Beth Morgan
- Nicky Shaw
- Anya Shrubsole
- Claire Taylor
- Sarah Taylor (wk)
- Danielle Wyatt

== India ==
- Jhulan Goswami (captain)
- Anjum Chopra
- Soniya Dabir
- Diana David
- Anagha Deshpande
- Rumeli Dhar
- Harmanpreet Kaur
- Reema Malhotra
- Sulakshana Naik (wk)
- Mithali Raj
- Poonam Raut
- Priyanka Roy
- Amita Sharma
- Gouher Sultana

== New Zealand ==
- Aimee Watkins (captain)
- Amy Satterthwaite
- Suzie Bates
- Erin Bermingham
- Kate Broadmore
- Nicola Browne
- Sophie Devine
- Natalie Dodd
- Lucy Doolan
- Maria Fahey
- Sara McGlashan (wk)
- Liz Perry
- Rachel Priest
- Sian Ruck

== Pakistan ==
- Sana Mir (captain)
- Nain Abidi
- Armaan Khan
- Asmavia Iqbal
- Batool Fatima (wk)
- Bismah Maroof
- Javeria Khan
- Nida Dar
- Qanita Jalil
- Rabiya Shah
- Sadia Yousuf
- Sajjida Shah
- Sania Khan
- Urooj Mumtaz

== South Africa ==
- Cri-zelda Brits (captain)
- Susan Benade
- Trisha Chetty (wk)
- Mignon du Preez
- Shandre Fritz
- Shabnim Ismail
- Ashlyn Kilowan
- Marcia Letsoalo
- Sunette Loubser
- Alicia Smith
- Angelique Taai
- Chloe Tryon
- Charlize van der Westhuizen
- Dane van Niekerk

== Sri Lanka ==
- Chamani Seneviratna (captain)
- Dilani Manodara (wk)
- Suwini de Alwis
- Sandamali Dolawatte
- Hiruka Fernando
- Inoka Galagedara
- Chamari Atapattu
- Eshani Lokusuriyage
- Chamari Polgampola
- Udeshika Prabodhani
- Deepika Rasangika
- Dedunu Silva
- Sripali Weerakkody
- Chandi Wickramasinghe
- Shashikala Siriwardene (withdrawn)

== West Indies ==
- Merissa Aguilleira (captain, wk)
- Kirbyina Alexander
- Shemaine Campbelle (wk)
- Britney Cooper
- Shanel Daley
- Deandra Dottin
- Cordel Jack
- Stacy-Ann King
- Pamela Lavine
- Anisa Mohammed
- Juliana Nero
- Shakera Selman
- Tremayne Smartt
- Stafanie Taylor

== See also ==
- 2010 ICC World Twenty20 squads
