= 2016 Regional Women's Championship =

- Dates: 7 July – 17 July 2016
- Administrator(s): Cricket West Indies
- Cricket format: 50 over
- Tournament format(s): Round robin and final
- Champions: Trinidad and Tobago (12th title)
- Participants: 6
- Matches: 16
- Most runs: Chedean Nation (39)
- Most wickets: Shakera Selman (5)

The 2016 Regional Women's Championship was a 50-over women's cricket competition that took place in the West Indies. It took place in July 2016, with 6 teams taking part and all matches taking place in Guyana. Trinidad and Tobago won the tournament, on better qualifying record after the final against Barbados was rained-off.

The tournament was followed by the 2016 Regional Women's Twenty20 Championship.

== Competition format ==
The six teams played in a round-robin, therefore playing five matches. Matches were played using a one day format with 50 overs per side. The top two teams in the group advanced to the final.

The group worked on a points system with positions being based on the total points. Points were awarded as follows:

Win: 4 points
Tie: 2 points
Loss: 0 points.
Abandoned/No Result: 2 points.
Bonus Points: 1 bonus point available per match.

== Points table ==
Team	Pld	W	L	T	NR	A	BP	Pts	NRR
Trinidad and Tobago (Q)	5	1	0	0	0	4	0	12	0.547
Guyana	5	1	1	0	0	3	1	11	1.867
Barbados (Q) (Note: It is unclear why Barbados qualified for the final ahead of Guyana.)	5	1	1	0	0	3	1	11	1.359
Jamaica	5	1	1	0	0	3	1	11	–1.689
Windward Islands	5	0	0	0	0	5	0	10	—
Leeward Islands	5	0	1	0	0	4	0	8	–3.740

Source: CricketArchive

== Final ==
17 July 2016
Scorecard

Barbados	v	Trinidad and Tobago

Match Abandoned
Everest Cricket Club Ground, Georgetown
Umpires: Athol Hamilton and Jacqueline Williams

- No toss.
- No play possible due to rain.
- Trinidad and Tobago won the 2016 Regional Women's Championship on better record in qualifying.

== Statistics ==
=== Most runs ===
Player	Team	Matches	Innings	Runs	Average	HS	100s	50s
Chedean Nation	Jamaica	2	2	39	19.50	35	0	0
Rashada Williams	Jamaica	2	2	33	16.50	25	0	0
Shemaine Campbelle	Guyana	2	2	33	33.00	17*	0	0
Latoya Smith	Guyana	2	2	31	31.00	16	0	0
Deandra Dottin	Barbados	2	2	24	24.00	19*	0	0

Source: CricketArchive

=== Most wickets ===
Player	Team	Overs	Wickets	Average	BBI	5w
Shakera Selman	Barbados	12.0	5	5.60	3/10	0
Kirbyina Alexander	Trinidad and Tobago	6.0	4	3.50	4/14	0
Akaze Thompson	Guyana	6.0	4	6.75	2/7	0
Deandra Dottin	Barbados	8.0	4	6.75	4/13	0
Shanel Daley	Jamaica	6.4	3	5.33	2/10	0

Source: CricketArchive
