= 2015 Regional Women's Championship =

- Dates: 6 August – 16 August 2015
- Administrator(s): Cricket West Indies
- Cricket format: 50 over
- Tournament format(s): Round robin and final
- Champions: Barbados (1st title)
- Participants: 6
- Matches: 16
- Most runs: Kyshona Knight (229)
- Most wickets: Shakera Selman (15)

The 2015 Regional Women's Championship was a 50-over women's cricket competition that took place in the West Indies. It took place in August 2015, with 6 teams taking part and all matches taking place in Trinidad and Tobago. Barbados won the tournament, beating Jamaica in the final to claim their first 50-over title.

== Competition format ==
The six teams played in a round-robin, therefore playing five matches. Matches were played using a one day format with 50 overs per side. The top two teams in the group advanced to the final.

The group worked on a points system with positions being based on the total points. Points were awarded as follows:

Win: 4 points
Tie: 2 points
Loss: 0 points.
Abandoned/No Result: 2 points.
Bonus Points: 1 bonus point available per match.

== Points table ==
Team	Pld	W	L	T	NR	A	BP	Pts	NRR
Barbados (Q)	5	3	0	1	0	1	2	18	1.853
Jamaica (Q)	5	3	1	0	1	0	2	16	0.990
Trinidad and Tobago	5	2	1	1	1	0	2	14	0.880
South Windward Islands	5	2	2	0	1	0	1	11	–0.815
Guyana	5	1	3	0	0	1	1	7	–0.689
North Windward Islands	5	0	4	0	1	0	0	2	–2.159

Source: CricketArchive

== Final ==
16 August 2015
Scorecard

Barbados; 242/7 (50 overs)	v	Jamaica; 118 (38.5 overs)
Kyshona Knight 68 (65); Vanessa Watts 4/39 (10 overs)		Stafanie Taylor 47 (61); Keila Elliott 3/17 (4.5 overs)

Barbados won by 124 runs
National Cricket Centre, Couva
Umpires: Erickson Degalarie and Francis Maurice
Player of the match: Kyshona Knight

- Barbados won the toss and elected to bat.

== Statistics ==
=== Most runs ===
Player	Team	Matches	Innings	Runs	Average	HS	100s	50s
Kyshona Knight	Barbados	5	5	229	45.80	68	0	2
Stafanie Taylor	Jamaica	6	6	215	35.83	67	0	2
Hayley Matthews	Barbados	5	5	187	37.40	90	0	2
Chedean Nation	Jamaica	6	6	168	33.60	168	0	1
Shemaine Campbelle	Guyana	4	4	160	80.00	59*	0	1

Source: CricketArchive

=== Most wickets ===
Player	Team	Overs	Wickets	Average	BBI	5w
Shakera Selman	Barbados	37.0	15	56.66	6/10	1
Karishma Ramharack	Trinidad and Tobago	33.3	13	8.07	8/23	1
Vanessa Watts	Jamaica	45.4	13	11.30	4/10	0
Shamilia Connell	Barbados	32.1	7	9.42	4/8	0
Stafanie Taylor	Jamaica	33.5	7	13.71	3/4	0

Source: CricketArchive
