= 2016–17 Women's Regional Super50 =

Central American women's cricket competition

- Dates: 20 April – 30 April 2017
- Administrator(s): Cricket West Indies
- Cricket format: 50 over
- Tournament format(s): Round robin and final
- Champions: Trinidad and Tobago (13th title)
- Participants: 6
- Matches: 16
- Most runs: Hayley Matthews (158)
- Most wickets: Afy Fletcher (15); Hayley Matthews (15)

The 2016–17 Women's Regional Super50 was a 50-over women's cricket competition that took place in the West Indies. It took place in April 2017, with 6 teams taking part and all matches taking place in Saint Vincent and the Grenadines. Trinidad and Tobago won the tournament, beating Barbados in the final.

== Competition format ==
The six teams played in a round-robin, therefore playing five matches. Matches were played using a one day format with 50 overs per side. The top two teams in the group advanced to the final.

The group worked on a points system with positions being based on the total points. Points were awarded as follows:

Win: 4 points
Tie: 2 points
Loss: 0 points.
Abandoned/No Result: 2 points.

== Points table ==
Team	Pld	W	L	T	NR	A	Pts	NRR
Barbados (Q)	5	5	0	0	0	0	20	1.614
Trinidad and Tobago (Q)	5	4	1	0	0	0	16	1.167
Windward Islands	5	3	2	0	0	0	12	0.468
Jamaica	5	1	3	0	0	1	6	–0.042
Guyana	5	1	4	0	0	0	4	–1.112
Leeward Islands	5	0	4	0	0	1	2	–2.645

Source: CricketArchive

== Final ==
30 April 2017
Scorecard

Trinidad and Tobago; 164 (46 overs)	v	Barbados; 143 (45.5 overs)
Felicia Walters 53 (140); Keila Elliott 4/47 (10 overs)		Deandra Dottin 32 (59); Felicia Walters 3/25 (10 overs)

Trinidad and Tobago won by 21 runs
Arnos Vale Playing Field, Arnos Vale
Umpires: Dion Bynoe and Anfernee Joseph
Player of the match: Felicia Walters

- Barbados won the toss and elected to field.

== Statistics ==
=== Most runs ===
Player	Team	Matches	Innings	Runs	Average	HS	100s	50s
Hayley Matthews	Barbados	6	6	158	31.60	56*	0	1
Felicia Walters	Trinidad and Tobago	6	6	149	49.66	53	0	1
Deandra Dottin	Barbados	6	6	131	26.20	47	0	0
Kyshona Knight	Barbados	4	3	116	58.00	56	0	1
Stacy-Ann King	Trinidad and Tobago	6	6	107	26.75	58*	0	1

Source: CricketArchive

=== Most wickets ===
Player	Team	Overs	Wickets	Average	BBI	5w
Afy Fletcher	Windward Islands	38.5	15	6.20	7/13	1
Hayley Matthews	Barbados	45.5	15	6.60	6/16	1
Subrina Munroe	Guyana	33.0	13	8.30	6/24	1
Anisa Mohammed	Trinidad and Tobago	51.1	13	9.46	4/18	0
Shamilia Connell	Barbados	42.0	12	8.16	4/15	0

Source: CricketArchive
