= 2018 Women's Regional Super50 =

- Dates: 20 June – 24 June 2018
- Administrator(s): Cricket West Indies
- Cricket format: 50 over
- Tournament format(s): League
- Champions: Barbados (2nd title)
- Participants: 6
- Matches: 9
- Most runs: Shemaine Campbelle (155)
- Most wickets: Amanda Edwards (9)

The 2018 Women's Regional Super50 was a 50-over women's cricket competition that took place in the West Indies. It took place in June 2018, with 6 teams taking part and all matches taking place in Jamaica. Barbados won the tournament, their second 50-over title.

The tournament followed the 2018 Regional Women's Twenty20 Championship.

== Competition format ==
Teams played in a league of six, playing three matches. Matches were played using a one day format with 50 overs per side. The top team in the group were crowned the Champions.

The group worked on a points system with positions being based on the total points. Points were awarded as follows:

Win: 4 points
Tie: 2 points
Loss: 0 points.
Abandoned/No Result: 2 points.
Bonus Point: 1 bonus point available per match.

== Points table ==
Team	Pld	W	L	T	NR	A	BP	Pts	NRR
Barbados (C)	3	2	0	0	0	1	1	11	1.876
Jamaica	3	2	0	0	0	1	1	11	1.121
Trinidad and Tobago	3	1	1	0	0	1	1	7	1.832
Guyana	3	1	1	0	0	1	1	7	–0.532
Windward Islands	3	0	2	0	0	1	0	2	–1.469
Leeward Islands	3	0	2	0	0	1	0	2	–2.530

Source: CricketArchive

== Statistics ==
=== Most runs ===
Player	Team	Matches	Innings	Runs	Average	HS	100s	50s
Shemaine Campbelle	Guyana	2	2	155	77.50	107	1	0
Stafanie Taylor	Jamaica	2	2	138	138.00	98*	0	1
Hayley Matthews	Barbados	2	2	119	59.50	84	0	1
Chedean Nation	Jamaica	2	2	101	101.00	72*	0	1
Juliana Nero	Windward Islands	2	2	89	44.50	60	0	1

Source: CricketArchive

=== Most wickets ===
Player	Team	Overs	Wickets	Average	BBI	5w
Amanda Edwards	Leeward Islands	19.4	9	10.88	6/56	1
Karishma Ramharack	Trinidad and Tobago	15.3	7	6.00	4/11	0
Sheneta Grimmond	Guyana	13.5	6	11.66	4/27	0
Deandra Dottin	Barbados	19.0	5	11.00	3/24	0
Hayley Matthews	Barbados	20.0	4	13.00	2/22	0

Source: CricketArchive
