= List of Barbados women Twenty20 International cricketers =

This is a list of Barbadian women Twenty20 International cricketers. A Twenty20 International is an international cricket match between two representative teams, each having Twenty20 International status, as determined by the International Cricket Council (ICC). A Twenty20 International is played under the rules of Twenty20 cricket.

This list includes all players who have played at least one T20I match for Barbados and is initially arranged in the order of debut appearance. Where more than one player won their first cap in the same match, those players are initially listed alphabetically at the time of debut.

Barbados women's team played their first match against Pakistan on 29 July 2022 during 2022 Commonwealth Games. As the West Indies qualified as a direct qualifier, the results of a separate tournament were originally going to be used to determine which Commonwealth Games Association (CGA) earned qualification. However, when the tournament was cancelled due to COVID-19, Barbados were selected to represent the West Indies, by virtue of being the Twenty20 Blaze defending champions.

== Key ==
General

- ‡ – Captain
- † – Wicket-keeper
- First – Year of debut
- Last – Year of latest game
- Mat – Number of matches played

Batting

- Runs – Runs scored in career
- HS – Highest score
- 50 – Number of half centuries
- Avg – Runs scored per dismissal
- * – Batswoman remained not out

Bowling

- Wkt – Wickets taken in career
- BBI – Best bowling in an innings
- Ave – Average runs per wicket

Fielding

- Ca – Catches taken
- St – Stumpings affected

== List of players ==
Status updated as of 3 August 2022.

Barbados women T20I cricketers
General					Batting				Bowling				Fielding		Ref
No.	Name	First	Last	Mat	Runs	HS	Avg	50	Balls	Wkt	BBI	Ave	Ca	St	Ref
1	Aaliyah Alleyne (Note: These players also played WT20I cricket for West Indies. Only their records for Barbados are given above.)	2022	2022	3	8	8	2.66	0	48	1	1/29	74.00	0	0	
2	Shanika Bruce	2022	2022	3	1	1*	–	0	30	2	1/7	17.00	0	0	
3	Shamilia Connell	2022	2022	3	2	2*	2.00	0	60	1	1/28	69.00	1	0	
4	Deandra Dottin	2022	2022	3	16	8	5.33	0	36	1	1/25	65.00	1	0	
5	Trishan Holder	2022	2022	3	6	6	3.00	0	–	–	–	–	0	0	
6	Kycia Knight†	2022	2022	3	74	62*	37.00	1	–	–	–	–	1	1	
7	Kyshona Knight	2022	2022	3	30	16	10.00	0	–	–	–	–	0	0	
8	Hayley Matthews‡	2022	2022	3	78	51	26.00	1	60	2	1/13	25.50	1	0	
9	Alisa Scantlebury	2022	2022	3	16	8	8.00	0	–	–	–	–	0	0	
10	Shakera Selman	2022	2022	3	12	12*	12.00	0	49	1	1/20	45.00	0	0	
11	Aaliyah Williams	2022	2022	1	–	–	–	–	–	–	–	–	0	0	
12	Keila Elliott	2022	2022	1	2	2	2.00	0	6	0	–	–	0	0	
13	Shaunte Carrington	2022	2022	1	3	3	3.00	0	–	–	–	–	0	0	
