= Saint Vincent and the Grenadines women's national cricket team =

Saint Vincent and the Grenadines

Team information
- Founded: First recorded match: 2000
- Dissolved: 2016
- Home ground: Arnos Vale Playing Field, Arnos Vale

History
- S50 wins: 1
- T20 Blaze wins: 0

The Saint Vincent and the Grenadines women's national cricket team is the women's representative cricket team of the country of Saint Vincent and the Grenadines. They competed in the West Indies women's domestic cricket structure between 2000 and 2014, after which they were replaced by the Windward Islands.

== History ==
Saint Vincent and the Grenadines joined the West Indies domestic structure in 2000, playing in the Federation Championships. The results of this season are not recorded. In 2002 they reached the semi-finals of the knockout section of the Championships before winning their first title in 2004, topping the league section of the tournament with 5 wins from 6 games.

The following season, 2005, St Vincent were runners-up in both sections of the competition, losing out to Trinidad and Tobago both times. St Vincent continued competing in the tournament until 2014, and finished runners-up again in 2010, again losing in the final to Trinidad and Tobago. The side also competed in the first two seasons of the Twenty20 Blaze in 2012 and 2013, both times finishing 5th in the tournament.

After 2014 St Vincent no longer competed in the domestic structure, with North Windward Islands and South Windward Islands competing in 2015 and a unified Windward Islands team, including Saint Vincent and the Grenadines, competing from 2016 onwards. The side did compete in three friendlies against Grenada in 2016, but the results are unrecorded.

== Players ==
=== Notable players ===
Players who played for Saint Vincent and the Grenadines and played internationally are listed below, in order of first international appearance (given in brackets):

- (Cricket West Indies) Juliana Nero (2003)
- (Cricket West Indies) Genielle Greaves (2003)
- (Cricket West Indies) Clea Hoyte (2003)
- (Cricket West Indies) Cordel Jack (2005)
- (Canada) Terisha Lavia (2025)

== Honours ==
- Women's Super50 Cup:
  - Winners (1): 2004 (League)
- Twenty20 Blaze:
  - Winners (0):
  - Best finish: 5th (2012 & 2013)

== See also ==
- Windward Islands women's cricket team
- Saint Vincent and the Grenadines national cricket team
