= Nerissa Crafton =

West Indian cricketer (born 1998)

Personal information
- Full name: Nerissa Kershara Crafton
- Born: 23 July 1998 (age 28)
- Batting: Left-handed
- Bowling: Left-arm medium
- Role: Batter

International information
- National side: West Indies
- Only ODI (cap 100): 24 December 2024 v India
- ODI shirt no.: 32
- T20I debut (cap 53): 17 December 2024 v India
- Last T20I: 19 December 2024 v India
- T20I shirt no.: 32

Domestic team information
- Years: Team
- 2012–2014: Saint Lucia
- 2016–present: Windward Islands

Career statistics
Competition	WLA	WT20
Matches	32	37
Runs scored	273	188
Batting average	10.50	6.96
100s/50s	0/0	0/0
Top score	47	23
Balls bowled	262	142
Wickets	7	5
Bowling average	30.42	29.20
5 wickets in innings	0	0
10 wickets in match	0	0
Best bowling	2/14	2/11
Catches/stumpings	7/–	10/–
- Source: Cricinfo, 18 December 2024

Nerissa Kershara Crafton (born 23 July 1998) is a West Indian cricketer who plays for the Windward Islands women's cricket team in the Women's Super50 Cup and the Twenty20 Blaze tournaments. She also plays for West Indies women's cricket team.

== Career ==
Crafton made her List A debut for Saint Lucia against Jamaica on 5 August 2013. She made her T20 debut for Saint Lucia against Jamaica on 8 August 2013.

In August 2024, she was named in the West Indies squad for the 2024 ICC Women's T20 World Cup. In December 2024, she was named in ODI and T20I squad against India. She made her Twenty20 International (T20I) debut against India in the same series on 17 December 2024. She made her One Day International (ODI) debut against India on 24 December 2024 and became the 100th ODI cricketer for West Indies.
