= Women's Twenty20 Blaze =

Women's T20 Blaze
- Countries: West Indies
- Administrator: Cricket West Indies (CWI)
- Format: Twenty20
- First edition: 2012
- Latest edition: 2026
- Tournament format: Round-robin
- Number of teams: 6
- Current champion: Jamaica (4th title)
- Most successful: Jamaica (4 titles)

The Women's T20 Blaze, officially the Cricket West Indies Women's T20 Blaze and previously known as the Cricket West Indies Women's Twenty20 Blaze and West Indies Cricket Board Regional Women's Twenty20 Championship, is a women's Twenty20 cricket competition organised by Cricket West Indies.

The competition began in 2012 and currently features six Caribbean teams (Barbados, Guyana, Jamaica, Leeward Islands, Trinidad and Tobago and Windward Islands) competing in a round-robin group stage. The competition runs alongside the Women's Super50 Cup. The current champions are Jamaica, who won the competition in 2024.

== History ==
The tournament began in 2012, as the West Indies Cricket Board Regional Women's Twenty20 Championship. The tournament was a round-robin of eight teams, with a subsequent final, along with 3rd, 5th and 7th place play-offs. Jamaica were the inaugural winners of the tournament, beating Trinidad and Tobago in the final, with Jamaica captain Stafanie Taylor being named Player of the Tournament. The following season, 2013, the eight teams were divided into two groups of four, with the top two in each group proceeding to the semi-finals. Jamaica won the tournament a second time, beating Barbados in the final.

The tournament was then not played until 2016, and was also reduced to six teams, with Leeward Islands and Windward Islands replacing the teams representing their constituent nations. The teams played in two groups of three with the winner of each group progressing to the final, in which Trinidad and Tobago beat Jamaica. In 2018, the six teams played in a round-robin group, with Barbados being crowned champions after topping the group.

The next tournament was played in the 2018–19 season, being played in March and April 2019, and was renamed the Twenty20 Blaze. The same format as the previous season was retained, and Barbados again won the tournament, claiming their second title.

The tournaments scheduled to take place in 2020 and 2021 were cancelled due to the COVID-19 pandemic. Due to the postponements, the most recent winner of the competition, Barbados, qualified to participate in the 2022 Commonwealth Games. The Twenty20 Blaze returned in June 2022, with Jamaica winning their third title. Barbados won the tournament in 2023, beating Guyana on head-to-head record. Jamaica won their fourth title in 2024, winning the group unbeaten.

== Teams ==
Team	First	Last	Titles
Barbados	2012	2024	3
Dominica	2012	2013	0
Grenada	2012	2013	0
Guyana	2012	2024	0
Jamaica	2012	2024	4
Leeward Islands	2016	2024	0
Saint Lucia	2012	2013	0
Saint Vincent and the Grenadines	2012	2013	0
Trinidad and Tobago	2012	2024	1
Windward Islands	2016	2024	0

== Roll of Honour ==
Season	Winner	Runner-up	Leading run-scorer	Leading wicket-taker	Ref
2012	Jamaica	Trinidad and Tobago	Stafanie Taylor (Jam) 409	Shaquana Quintyne (Bar) 15	
2013	Jamaica	Barbados	Stafanie Taylor (Jam) 170	Kirbyina Alexander (T+T) 11	
2016	Trinidad and Tobago	Jamaica	Shemaine Campbelle (Guy) 182	Anisa Mohammed (T+T); Erva Giddings (Guy); Shanel Daley (Jam) 9	
2018	Barbados	Jamaica	Hayley Matthews (Bar) 173	Chedean Nation (Jam); Vanessa Watts (Jam) 9	
2019	Barbados	Jamaica	Deandra Dottin (Bar) 222	Hayley Matthews (Bar) 11	
2022	Jamaica	Barbados	Hayley Matthews (Bar) 191	Shanika Bruce (Bar) 9	
2023	Barbados	Guyana	Kycia Knight (Bar) 165	Afy Fletcher (WI) 10	
2024	Jamaica	Guyana	Rashada Williams (Jam) 183	Plaffiana Millington (Guy) 11	
2025					
2026					

== See also ==
- Women's Super50 Cup
