= List of West Indies women Twenty20 International cricketers =

A Twenty20 International is an international cricket match between two representative teams. A Twenty20 International is played under the rules of Twenty20 cricket. In April 2018, the International Cricket Council (ICC) granted full international status to Twenty20 women's matches played between member sides from 1 July 2018 onwards. The West Indies women's team made its debut in T20I when it defeated Ireland in Dublin by 75 runs. As of June 2024, 51 women cricketers have played Twenty20 international for the West Indies. Six players have captained the team.

The West Indies women's cricket team is a multi-national cricket team that represents the West Indies (Antigua and Barbuda, Barbados, Dominica, Grenada, Guyana, Jamaica, Saint Lucia, Saint Vincent and the Grenadines, Trinidad and Tobago, parts of Saint Kitts and Nevis, Montserrat, British Virgin Islands, Sint Maarten and the US Virgin Islands).

The list comprises all members of the West Indies women's cricket team who have played at least one Twenty20 international match.

== Key ==
General

- ‡ – Captain
- † – Wicket-keeper
- First – Year of debut
- Last – Year of latest game
- Mat – Number of matches played
- Win% – Winning percentage
- Tied+Win – Won in a Super Over
- Tied+Lost – Lost in a super over
- NR – No result

Batting

- Runs – Runs scored in career
- HS – Highest score
- 100 – Centuries scored
- 50 – Half-centuries scored
- Avg – Runs scored per dismissal
- * – Batsman remained not out

Bowling

- Balls – Balls bowled in career
- Wkt – Wickets taken in career
- BBI – Best bowling in an innings
- Ave – Average runs per wicket

Fielding

- Ca – Catches taken
- St – Stumpings effected

== List of players ==
Statistics are correct as of 30 June 2026.

West Indies women's Twenty20 international cricketers
No.	Name	First	Last	Mat	Batting					Bowling				Fielding		Ref
No.	Name	First	Last	Mat	Runs	HS	50	100	Avg	Balls	Wkt	BBI	Ave	Ca	St	Ref
1	Kirbyina Alexander	2008	2010	6	15	11	0	0	7.50	78	3	3/20	28.33	0	0	
2	Deandra Dottin (Note: These players also played WT20I cricket for Barbados. Only their records for West Indies are given above.)	2008	2026	151	3212	112*	14	2	26.54	1332	76	5/5	19.55	49	0	
3	Nadine George ‡ †	2008	2008	3	32	31	0	0	10.66	—	—	—	—	0	4	
4	Stacy-Ann King	2008	2019	86	989	81	3	0	17.05	491	18	3/19	29.00	32	0	
5	Debbie-Ann Lewis	2008	2009	5	16	7	0	0	4.00	80	3	2/23	29.00	0	0	
6	Anisa Mohammed ‡	2008	2021	117	152	20*	0	0	7.23	2373	125	5/10	17.64	27	0	
7	Chedean Nation	2008	2024	57	552	63*	2	0	15.33	126	7	2/14	18.71	8	0	
8	Juliana Nero	2008	2013	45	589	44	0	0	14.72	—	—	—	—	14	0	
9	Shakera Selman	2008	2023	93	49	7*	0	0	8.16	1427	50	3/23	27.90	26	0	
10	Danielle Small	2008	2010	5	11	7	0	0	11.00	78	2	2/20	35.00	1	0	
11	Stafanie Taylor ‡	2008	2026	139	3666	90	22	0	34.58	1749	98	4/12	16.86	37	0	
12	Afy Fletcher	2008	2026	114	224	219	0	0	8.00	2181	106	5/13	21.53	21	0	
13	Lee-Ann Kirby	2008	2020	9	59	20	0	0	7.37	18	1	1/8	8.00	4	0	
14	Gaitri Seetahal	2008	2008	1	—	—	—	—	—	18	3	3/12	4.00	0	0	
15	Charlene Taitt	2008	2008	1	4	4	0	0	4.00	18	2	2/7	3.50	3	0	
16	Merissa Aguilleira † ‡	2009	2019	95	768	39*	0	0	14.49	—	—	—	—	38	34	
17	Pamela Lavine	2009	2010	15	202	61	1	0	15.53	190	7	4/21	29.28	2	0	
18	Shanel Daley	2009	2014	68	464	48	0	0	12.21	1363	72	5/15	15.45	15	0	
19	Cordel Jack	2009	2010	13	164	41	0	0	13.66	126	4	1/12	34.25	8	0	
20	Shemaine Campbelle ‡ †	2009	2026	160	1707	90*	0	0	16.41	793	34	3/7	19.88	42	30	
21	Britney Cooper	2009	2023	76	633	61	1	0	11.10	—	—	—	—	27	0	
22	Tremayne Smartt	2009	2018	58	172	62	1	0	9.76	838	38	3/9	20.26	11	0	
23	Amanda Samaroo	2009	2012	5	33	12*	0	0	11.00	—	—	—	—	1	0	
24	Pearl Etienne	2010	2012	13	28	11*	0	0	14.00	132	4	2/9	28.50	2	0	
25	Subrina Munroe	2010	2015	21	9	6	0	0	9.00	309	13	2/10	22.30	4	0	
26	Kycia Knight †	2011	2022	67	727	50*	1	0	15.80	—	—	—	—	22	10	
27	Shaquana Quintyne	2011	2016	45	182	29	0	0	10.70	813	39	5/16	19.97	13	0	
28	Natasha McLean †	2012	2022	39	435	57*	1	0	15.53	—	—	—	—	11	0	
29	Kyshona Knight †	2013	2022	52	516	420	0	0	12.28	—	—	—	—	14	0	
30	June Ogle	2013	2013	2	12	6	0	0	6.00	—	—	—	—	0	0	
31	Chinelle Henry	2013	2026	78	700	51*	1	0	17.94	823	31	3/26	30.48	45	0	
32	Vanessa Watts	2014	2014	4	25	16	0	0	8.33	60	2	1/22	32.00	1	0	
33	Shamilia Connell	2014	2024	75	57	15	0	0	11.40	1281	51	3/14	28.13	15	0	
34	Hayley Matthews ‡	2014	2026	124	3304	132	20	3	29.23	2336	128	4/10	18.87	43	0	
35	Akeira Peters	2017	2018	7	7	4*	0	0	7.00	54	2	1/7	34.00	2	0	
36	Reniece Boyce	2018	2019	6	20	12	0	0	4.00	—	—	—	—	0	0	
37	Karishma Ramharack ‡	2019	2026	60	31	5*	0	0	5.16	1056	43	4/15	27.86	14	0	
38	Shabika Gajnabi	2019	2025	41	354	33	0	0	12.20	117	3	1/8	52.66	15	0	
39	Sheneta Grimmond	2019	2023	15	80	15	0	0	7.27	190	7	3/33	31.00	3	0	
40	Aaliyah Alleyne	2019	2026	65	367	49*	0	0	12.65	737	25	4/27	38.40	16	0	
41	Cherry-Ann Fraser	2020	2025	23	31	8	0	0	6.20	288	12	3/20	32.16	5	0	
42	Qiana Joseph	2021	2026	40	521	63	2	0	16.28	318	12	3/8	26.58	9	0	
43	Rashada Williams †	2022	2024	25	210	38	0	0	10.50	12	1	1/18	18.00	11	2	
44	Djenaba Joseph	2022	2025	7	38	11	0	0	5.42	—	—	—	—	0	0	
45	Trishan Holder	2022	2023	6	29	21	0	0	9.66	—	—	—	—	1	0	
46	Kaysia Schultz	2022	2023	4	0	0	0	0	0.00	36	0	—	—	1	0	
47	Shanika Bruce	2023	2023	2	–	–	–	–	–	42	1	1/25	45.00	0	0	
48	Jannillea Glasgow	2023	2026	26	247	53*	1	0	19.00	69	3	3/15	25.33	7	0	
49	Zaida James	2023	2026	31	139	21*	0	0	11.58	259	10	2/10	32.00	5	0	
50	Ashmini Munisar	2023	2026	16	3	2*	0	0	–	276	12	2/15	24.58	0	0	
51	Kate Wilmott	2024	2024	2	3	3*	0	0	–	18	0	—	—	0	0	
52	Mandy Mangru †	2024	2026	10	21	17	0	0	7.00	—	—	—	—	6	0	
53	Nerissa Crafton	2024	2025	5	14	9	0	0	4.66	6	0	—	—	1	0	
54	Realeanna Grimmond	2025	2025	5	28	15	0	0	7.00	—	—	—	—	3	0	
55	Jahzara Claxton	2025	2026	19	104	21	0	0	9.45	199	12	3/39	22.91	7	0	
56	Shawnisha Hector	2025	2026	6	15	7*	0	0	7.50	72	5	2/21	21.00	0	0	
57	Eboni Brathwaite	2026	2026	2	26	18	0	0	13.00	—	—	—	—	0	0	

== List of captains ==
No.	Name	First	Last	Mat	Won	Lost	Tied	NR	Win%
1	Nadine George	2008	2008	3	3	0	0	0	100%
2	Merissa Aguilleira	2009	2019	73	39	29	3	1	57.04%
3	Anisa Mohammed	2010	2021	9	2	6	0	1	25.00%
4	Stafanie Taylor	2012	2021	55	29	24	2	0	54.54%
5	Shemaine Campbelle	2012	2012	1	1	0	0	0	100%
6	Hayley Matthews	2022	2026	54	21	31	1	1	40.56%
7	Karishma Ramharack	2025	2025	1	1	0	0	0	100.00%

== See also ==
- List of West Indies women Test cricketers
- List of West Indies women ODI cricketers
