= Geneille Greaves =

West Indian cricketer

Personal information
- Full name: Geneille Emekia Greaves
- Born: 21 February 1983 (age 43); St Vincent
- Batting: Right-handed
- Bowling: Right-arm off break
- Role: Batter

International information
- National side: West Indies (2003–2009)
- Only Test (cap 25): 15 March 2004 v Pakistan
- ODI debut (cap 47): 18 March 2003 v Sri Lanka
- Last ODI: 21 March 2009 v Pakistan

Domestic team information
- Years: Team
- 2001–2005: Saint Vincent and the Grenadines

Career statistics
Competition	WTest	WODI	WLA
Matches	1	9	22
Runs scored	43	35	357
Batting average	21.50	3.88	16.22
100s/50s	0/0	0/0	1/1
Top score	24	13	134
Balls bowled	24	24	254
Wickets	0	0	13
Bowling average	–	–	14.30
5 wickets in innings	0	0	0
10 wickets in match	0	0	0
Best bowling	0/11	–	4/28
Catches/stumpings	3/–	2/–	4/–
- Source: CricketArchive, 8 June 2021

Geneille Emekia Greaves (born 21 February 1983) is a Vincentian former cricketer who played as a top-order batter, who also bowled occasional right-arm off break. She appeared in 1 Test match and 9 One Day Internationals for the West Indies between 2003 and 2009. She played domestic cricket for Saint Vincent and the Grenadines.

Greaves made her international debut on 18 March 2003, facing Sri Lanka in a women's One Day International in Port of Spain, Trinidad and Tobago. Greaves bowled three overs without taking a wicket, and scored three runs as an opening batsman before being run out as the West Indies lost by 38 runs. She played twice more during that series, scoring four and one. She made five One Day International appearances the following year, during which she made her highest score in that format of cricket, 13. She also featured in her only Test match appearance during 2004, facing Pakistan in Karachi. She scored 19 runs in the first innings and 24 in the second in a drawn match. She returned to international cricket in 2009, after a five-year absence, as part of the West Indies squad at the 2009 Women's Cricket World Cup. She did not play until the fifth-place playoff match against Pakistan, when she scored three runs batting at number seven. In all, she had a disappointing return for a batsman, scoring just 35 runs in her nine ODI matches, at an average of 3.88. She performed better in her solitary Test, scoring 43 runs at an average of 21.50. She bowled 48 balls in international cricket without taking a wicket.
