= Caneisha Isaac =

West Indian cricketer

Cricket information
- Role: Bowler

International information
- National side: West Indies
- Only ODI (cap 92): 7 July 2021 v Pakistan

Domestic team information
- Years: Team
- 2016/17–present: Trinidad and Tobago
- 2022: Trinbago Knight Riders
- Source: Cricinfo, 13 July 2021

Caneisha Isaac is a Trinidadian cricketer who plays for the Trinidad and Tobago women's national cricket team in the Women's Super50 Cup and the Twenty20 Blaze tournaments. In April 2019, Isaac replaced Britney Cooper during India's tour of the West Indies. In April 2021, Isaac was named in Cricket West Indies' high-performance training camp in Antigua.

In June 2021, Isaac was named in the West Indies A Team for their series against Pakistan. The following month, Isacc was named in the West Indies' Women's One Day International (WODI) squad, also for their matches against Pakistan. She made her WODI debut on 7 July 2021, for the West Indies against Pakistan.
