= Clea Hoyte =

West Indies cricketer (born 1981)

Personal information
- Full name: Clea-Nasira Hoyte
- Born: 9 August 1981 (age 45); St Vincent
- Batting: Right-handed
- Bowling: Right-arm medium
- Role: Bowler

International information
- National side: West Indies (2003)
- ODI debut (cap 48): 20 March 2003 v Sri Lanka
- Last ODI: 23 March 2003 v Sri Lanka

Domestic team information
- Years: Team
- 2002–2012: Saint Vincent and the Grenadines

Career statistics
| Competition | WODI | WLA | WT20 |
|---|---|---|---|
| Matches | 3 | 23 | 7 |
| Runs scored | 1 | 96 | 59 |
| Batting average | 0.50 | 6.40 | 11.80 |
| 100s/50s | 0/0 | 0/0 | 0/0 |
| Top score | 1 | 17 | 28* |
| Balls bowled | 120 | 535 | 68 |
| Wickets | 2 | 21 | 1 |
| Bowling average | 24.50 | 14.45 | 65.00 |
| 5 wickets in innings | 0 | 0 | 0 |
| 10 wickets in match | 0 | 0 | 0 |
| Best bowling | 1/13 | 3/17 | 1/15 |
| Catches/stumpings | 0/– | 4/– | 0/– |
- Source: CricketArchive, 8 June 2021

Clea-Nasira Hoyte (born 9 August 1981) is a Vincentian former cricketer who played primarily as a right-arm medium bowler. She appeared in three One Day Internationals for the West Indies in 2003. She played domestic cricket for Saint Vincent and the Grenadines.
