= Danielle Small (cricketer) =

West Indies cricketer (born 1989)

Personal information
- Full name: Danielle Gloria Kamesha Small
- Born: 16 March 1989 (age 37); Barbados
- Batting: Right-handed
- Bowling: Right-arm off break
- Role: All-rounder

International information
- National side: West Indies (2008–2010)
- ODI debut (cap 59): 24 June 2008 v Ireland
- Last ODI: 18 April 2010 v Sri Lanka
- T20I debut (cap 10): 27 June 2008 v Ireland
- Last T20I: 23 April 2010 v Sri Lanka

Domestic team information
- Years: Team
- 2005–2018/19: Barbados

Career statistics
| Competition | WODI | WT20I |
|---|---|---|
| Matches | 12 | 5 |
| Runs scored | 82 | 11 |
| Batting average | 11.71 | 11.00 |
| 100s/50s | 0/0 | 0/0 |
| Top score | 37* | 7 |
| Balls bowled | 389 | 78 |
| Wickets | 8 | 2 |
| Bowling average | 26.87 | 35.00 |
| 5 wickets in innings | 0 | 0 |
| 10 wickets in match | 0 | 0 |
| Best bowling | 3/27 | 2/20 |
| Catches/stumpings | 1/– | 1/– |
- Source: ESPNCricinfo, 20 May 2021

Danielle Gloria Kamesha Small (born 16 March 1989) is a Barbadian cricketer who plays as a right-handed batter and right-arm off break bowler. Between 2008 and 2010, she appeared in 12 One Day Internationals and 5 Twenty20 Internationals for the West Indies, and she was part of their squad during the 2009 Women's Cricket World Cup. She played domestic cricket for Barbados.
