= Japhina Joseph =

West Indian cricketer

Cricket information
- Batting: Right-handed

International information
- National side: West Indies

Domestic team information
- Years: Team
- 2022–present: Windward Islands
- 2022: Barbados Royals
- Source: Cricinfo, 25 June 2021

Japhina Joseph is a Vincentian cricketer who plays for the Windward Islands and Barbados Royals. In April 2021, Joseph was named in Cricket West Indies' high-performance training camp in Antigua. In June 2021, Joseph was named in the West Indies A Team for their series against Pakistan.
