= Cordel Jack =

West Indies cricketer (born 1982)

Personal information
- Full name: Cordel Patricia Jack
- Born: 22 February 1982 (age 44); Saint Vincent
- Batting: Right-handed
- Bowling: Right-arm off break
- Role: All-rounder

International information
- National side: West Indies (2005–2010)
- ODI debut (cap 53): 30 March 2005 v Ireland
- Last ODI: 10 October 2010 v South Africa
- T20I debut (cap 19): 14 June 2009 v Australia
- Last T20I: 16 October 2010 v Netherlands

Domestic team information
- Years: Team
- 2002–2013: Saint Vincent and the Grenadines
- 2015: South Windward Islands
- 2016/17–2018/19: Windward Islands

Career statistics
Competition	WODI	WT20I
Matches	20	13
Runs scored	264	164
Batting average	14.66	13.66
100s/50s	0/1	0/0
Top score	81*	41
Balls bowled	300	126
Wickets	5	4
Bowling average	40.40	34.25
5 wickets in innings	0	0
10 wickets in match	0	0
Best bowling	1/12	1/12
Catches/stumpings	5/–	8/–
- Source: ESPNCricinfo, 19 May 2021

Cordel Patricia Jack (born 22 February 1982) is a Vincentian former cricketer who played as an all-rounder, batting right-handed and bowling right-arm off break. Between 2005 and 2010, she appeared in 20 One Day Internationals and 13 Twenty20 Internationals for the West Indies. She played domestic cricket for Saint Vincent and the Grenadines and Windward Islands.
