= Barbados women's national cricket team =

Cricket team

Barbados
- Flag of Barbados

Personnel
- Captain: Hayley Matthews
- Coach: Corey Collymore

Team information
- Founded: First recorded match: 1975

History
- First-class debut: Trinidad and Tobago in 1975 at Queen's Park Oval, Port of Spain
- S50 wins: 5
- T20 Blaze wins: 3

T20 Internationals
- First T20I: v. Pakistan at Edgbaston, Birmingham; 29 July 2022
- Last T20I: v. India at Edgbaston, Birmingham; 3 August 2022
T20Is	Played	Won/Lost
Total	3	1/2 (0 ties, 0 no results)
This year	0	0/0 (0 ties, 0 no results)
- As of 2 January 2023

The Barbados women's national cricket team is the women's representative cricket team of Barbados. They compete in the Women's Super50 Cup and the Women's Twenty20 Blaze. They have won five Super50 Cup titles and three Twenty20 Blaze titles.

In 2022, the team competed at the Commonwealth Games, playing three Twenty20 Internationals.

== History ==
Barbados joined the West Indies domestic structure for its inaugural season in 1975–76, playing in the Federation Championships. They managed one victory that season, beating Grenada by an innings and 83 runs. The following season, 1977, they again won one match and finished 3rd out of 5 teams. Barbados only played in one further season, 1980, before ending their participation in the domestic structure until 2004.

In their return season, 2004, they finished 4th in the league competition of the Federation Championships, as well as reaching the semi-finals of the knockout competition.

In 2013, Barbados reached the final of the second edition of the Twenty20 Blaze, but lost to Jamaica. 2015 saw Barbados win their first 50-over title, topping the league stage of the Regional Championship before beating Jamaica in the final. After finishing as runners-up in the 50-over competition in 2016 and 2016–17, Barbados dominated the next two seasons, winning both competitions in both years. The side went unbeaten throughout the whole 2018–19 season, with Barbadians Deandra Dottin and Hayley Matthews the leading run-scorer and the leading wicket-taker, respectively, in both competitions. They finished second in the 2022 Twenty20 Blaze, losing out to Jamaica on Net Run Rate, before beating Jamaica in the final of the 2022 Women's Super50 Cup to win their fourth one-day title.

In 2022, Barbados competed at the Commonwealth Games, representing the West Indies as the most recent winner of the Twenty20 Blaze at the time. All matches they played had Twenty20 International status, as stated by the ICC. Barbados won their first match of the tournament, beating Pakistan by 15 runs, before losing to Australia and India to finish third in their group. In 2023, they won both the Super50 Cup and the Twenty20 Blaze.

== Players ==
=== Current squad ===
Based on squad announced for the 2023 season. Players in bold have international caps.

Name	Nationality	Birth date	Batting style	Bowling style	Notes
Batters
Allison Gordon	West Indies	17 May 1998 (age 27)	Right-handed	Right-arm medium	
Theanny Herbert-Mayers	West Indies	Unknown	Unknown	Unknown	
**Trishan Holder**	West Indies	8 November 2003 (age 22)	Right-handed	Right-arm medium	
**Kyshona Knight**	West Indies	19 February 1992 (age 33)	Left-handed	Right-arm medium	
All-rounders
Asabi Callender	West Indies	21 November 2005 (age 20)	Right-handed	Right-arm medium	
Naijanni Cumberbatch	West Indies	Unknown	Right-handed	Right-arm medium	
**Hayley Matthews**	West Indies	19 March 1998 (age 27)	Right-handed	Right-arm off break	Captain
**Alisa Scantlebury**	West Indies	28 May 2003 (age 22)	Right-handed	Unknown	
Wicket-keepers
**Kycia Knight**	West Indies	19 February 1992 (age 33)	Right-handed	–	
Bowlers
**Aaliyah Alleyne**	West Indies	11 November 1994 (age 31)	Right-handed	Right-arm medium	
**Shanika Bruce**	West Indies	20 February 1995 (age 30)	Left-handed	Right-arm medium	
**Shamilia Connell**	West Indies	14 July 1992 (age 33)	Right-handed	Right-arm medium	
**Keila Elliott**	West Indies	18 December 1988 (age 36)	Right-handed	Right-arm leg break	
**Shakera Selman**	West Indies	1 September 1989 (age 36)	Right-handed	Right-arm medium	
**Aaliyah Williams**	West Indies	28 February 1998 (age 27)	Right-handed	Right-arm medium	

=== Notable players ===
Players who have played for Barbados and played internationally are listed below, in order of first international appearance (given in brackets). Players listed with a Barbados flag appeared for the side at the 2022 Commonwealth Games, which carried Twenty20 International status:

- (Cricket West Indies) Sheryl Bayley (1976)
- (Cricket West Indies) Gloria Gill (1976)
- (Cricket West Indies) Janet Mitchell (1976)
- (Cricket West Indies) Patricia Whittaker (1976)
- (Cricket West Indies) Pamela Lavine (2005)
- (Cricket West Indies) (Barbados) Deandra Dottin (2008)
- (Cricket West Indies) (Barbados) Shakera Selman (2008)
- (Cricket West Indies) Danielle Small (2008)
- (Cricket West Indies) Charlene Taitt (2008)
- (Cricket West Indies) (Barbados) Kycia Knight (2011)
- (Cricket West Indies) Shaquana Quintyne (2011)
- (Cricket West Indies) (Barbados) Kyshona Knight (2013)
- (Cricket West Indies) (Barbados) Shamilia Connell (2014)
- (Cricket West Indies) (Barbados) Hayley Matthews (2014)
- (Cricket West Indies) (Barbados) Aaliyah Alleyne (2019)
- (Barbados) (Cricket West Indies) Shanika Bruce (2022)
- (Barbados) (Cricket West Indies) Trishan Holder (2022)
- (Barbados) Alisa Scantlebury (2022)
- (Barbados) Aaliyah Williams (2022)
- (Barbados) Keila Elliott (2022)
- (Barbados) Shaunte Carrington (2022)
- (Canada) Tiffany Thorpe (2025)

== Honours ==
- Women's Super50 Cup:
  - Winners (5): 2015, 2018, 2018–19, 2022, 2023
- Twenty20 Blaze:
  - Winners (3): 2018, 2018–19, 2023

== Records ==
=== Twenty20 Internationals ===
- Highest team total: 144/4, vs Pakistan, 29 July 2022 at Edgbaston Cricket Ground, Birmingham.
- Highest individual innings: 62*, Kycia Knight vs Pakistan, 29 July 2022 at Edgbaston Cricket Ground, Birmingham.
- Best bowling figures in an innings: 1/7, Shanika Bruce vs Australia, 31 July 2022 at Edgbaston Cricket Ground, Birmingham.

T20I record versus other nations
Records complete to WT20I #1187. Last updated 4 August 2022.

Opponent	Matches	Won	Lost	Tied	N/R	First match	First win
ICC Full members
Australia	1	0	1	0	0	31 July 2022	
India	1	0	1	0	0	3 August 2022	
Pakistan	1	1	0	0	0	29 July 2022	29 July 2022

== See also ==
- Barbados national cricket team
- Barbados Royals (WCPL)
