= Shanika Bruce =

West Indian cricketer (born 1995)

Personal information
- Full name: Shanika Jamila Bruce
- Born: 20 February 1995 (age 31)
- Batting: Left-handed
- Bowling: Right-arm medium
- Role: Bowler

International information
- National sides: Barbados; West Indies
- T20I debut (cap 2/47): 29 July 2022; Barbados v Pakistan
- Last T20I: 25 January 2023; West Indies v South Africa

Domestic team information
- Years: Team
- 2013–present: Barbados
- 2022: Barbados Royals

Career statistics
Competition	WT20I
Matches	4
Runs scored	1
Batting average	–
100s/50s	0/0
Top score	1*
Balls bowled	54
Wickets	3
Bowling average	19.66
5 wickets in innings	0
10 wickets in match	0
Best bowling	1/7
Catches/stumpings	0/–
- Source: Cricinfo, 25 January 2023

Shanika Jamila Bruce (born 20 February 1995) is a Barbadian cricketer who plays for the Barbados women's national cricket team in the Women's Super50 Cup and the Twenty20 Blaze tournaments. In April 2019, Bruce was named as one of six reserve players for the West Indies' tour of England and Ireland. In April 2021, Bruce was named in Cricket West Indies' high-performance training camp in Antigua. Bruce is also studying for a degree at the University of the West Indies.

In June 2021, Bruce was named in the West Indies A Team for their series against Pakistan. In July 2022, she was named in the Barbados team for the cricket tournament at the 2022 Commonwealth Games in Birmingham, England. She made her Women's Twenty20 International (WT20I) debut on 29 July 2022, for Barbados against Pakistan at the Commonwealth Games.
