= Rashada Williams =

West Indian cricketer (born 1997)

Personal information
- Full name: Rashada Shieka Williams
- Born: 23 February 1997 (age 29)
- Batting: Right-handed
- Role: Wicket-keeper

International information
- National side: West Indies
- ODI debut (cap 93): 15 July 2021 v Pakistan
- Last ODI: 21 June 2024 v Sri Lanka
- T20I debut (cap 63): 28 September 2022 v New Zealand
- Last T20I: 3 May 2024 v Pakistan

Domestic team information
- Years: Team
- 2014–present: Jamaica
- 2022: Guyana Amazon Warriors
- 2023–present: Barbados Royals
- Source: Cricinfo, 15 October 2024

Rashada Williams (born 23 February 1997) is a Jamaican cricketer who plays for the Jamaica women's national cricket team in the Women's Super50 Cup and the Twenty20 Blaze tournaments. In January 2019, Williams was named in the West Indies' squad for their tour of Pakistan. In April 2021, Williams was named in Cricket West Indies' high-performance training camp in Antigua.

In June 2021, Williams was named in the West Indies A Team for their series against Pakistan. On 12 July 2021, Cricket West Indies added Williams to their Women's One Day International (WODI) squad for the final three matches against Pakistan. She made her WODI debut on 15 July 2021, for the West Indies against Pakistan.

In October 2021, she was named in the West Indies team for the 2021 Women's Cricket World Cup Qualifier tournament in Zimbabwe. In February 2022, she was named in the West Indies team for the 2022 Women's Cricket World Cup in New Zealand.

Williams was part of the West Indies squad for the 2025 Women's Cricket World Cup Qualifier in Pakistan in April 2025.
