= Tremayne Smartt =

West Indian cricketer (born 1985)

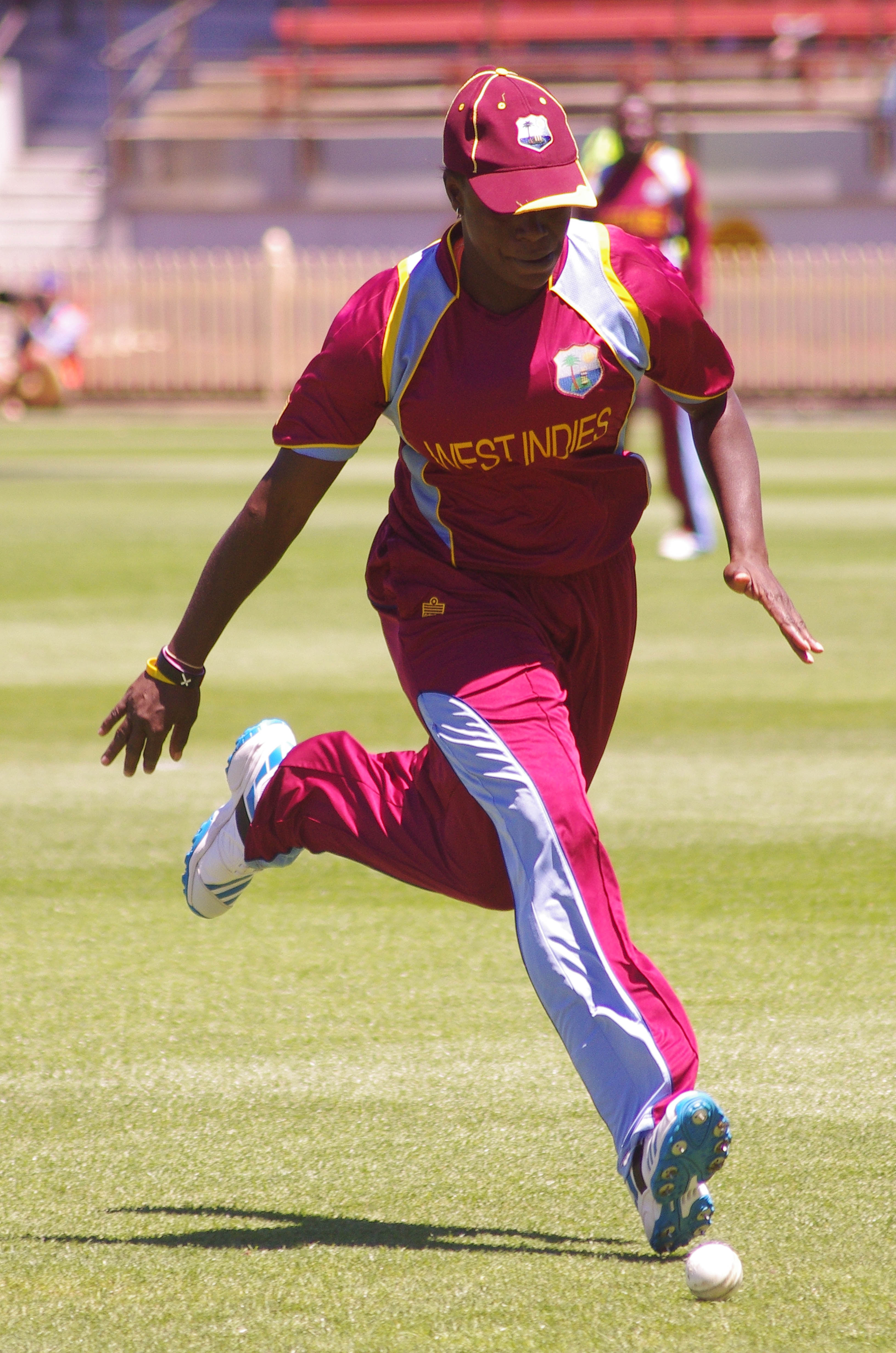
- Tremayne Smartt in 2014

Personal information
- Full name: Tremayne Dequette Smartt
- Born: 17 September 1985 (age 41); Guyana
- Batting: Right-handed
- Bowling: Right-arm medium
- Role: All-rounder

International information
- National side: West Indies (2009–2018)
- ODI debut (cap 70): 23 October 2009 v South Africa
- Last ODI: 8 March 2018 v New Zealand
- T20I debut (cap 22): 25 October 2009 v South Africa
- Last T20I: 25 March 2018 v New Zealand

Domestic team information
- Years: Team
- 2009–2022: Guyana

Career statistics
Competition	WODI	WT20I
Matches	57	58
Runs scored	157	172
Batting average	6.03	8.60
100s/50s	0/0	0/1
Top score	13	62
Balls bowled	2,121	838
Wickets	37	38
Bowling average	35.97	20.26
5 wickets in innings	1	0
10 wickets in match	0	0
Best bowling	5/24	3/9
Catches/stumpings	9/–	11/–
- Source: Cricinfo, 21 May 2021

Tremayne Dequette Smartt (born 17 September 1985) is a Guyanese cricketer who plays as a right-arm medium bowler and right-handed batter. Between 2009 and 2018, she appeared in 57 One Day Internationals and 58 Twenty20 Internationals for the West Indies. In 2010, along with Stacy-Ann King, she set the record for the highest third wicket partnership in a Twenty20 International, with 124 runs: they held the record for 9 years, and it is now the third-highest partnership for the third wicket.

In 2011, Smartt was suspended for five months after pleading guilty to a doping violation. Smartt had tested positive for Furosemide, in order to treat a swelling in her knee. The tribunal accepted that she didn't use the substance for performance enhancing purposes, and Smartt conceded that she did not effectively check the substance's status before use and would accept the consequences as a result. Smartt returned to the West Indies team shortly after her suspension ended.
