= Providence, Guyana =

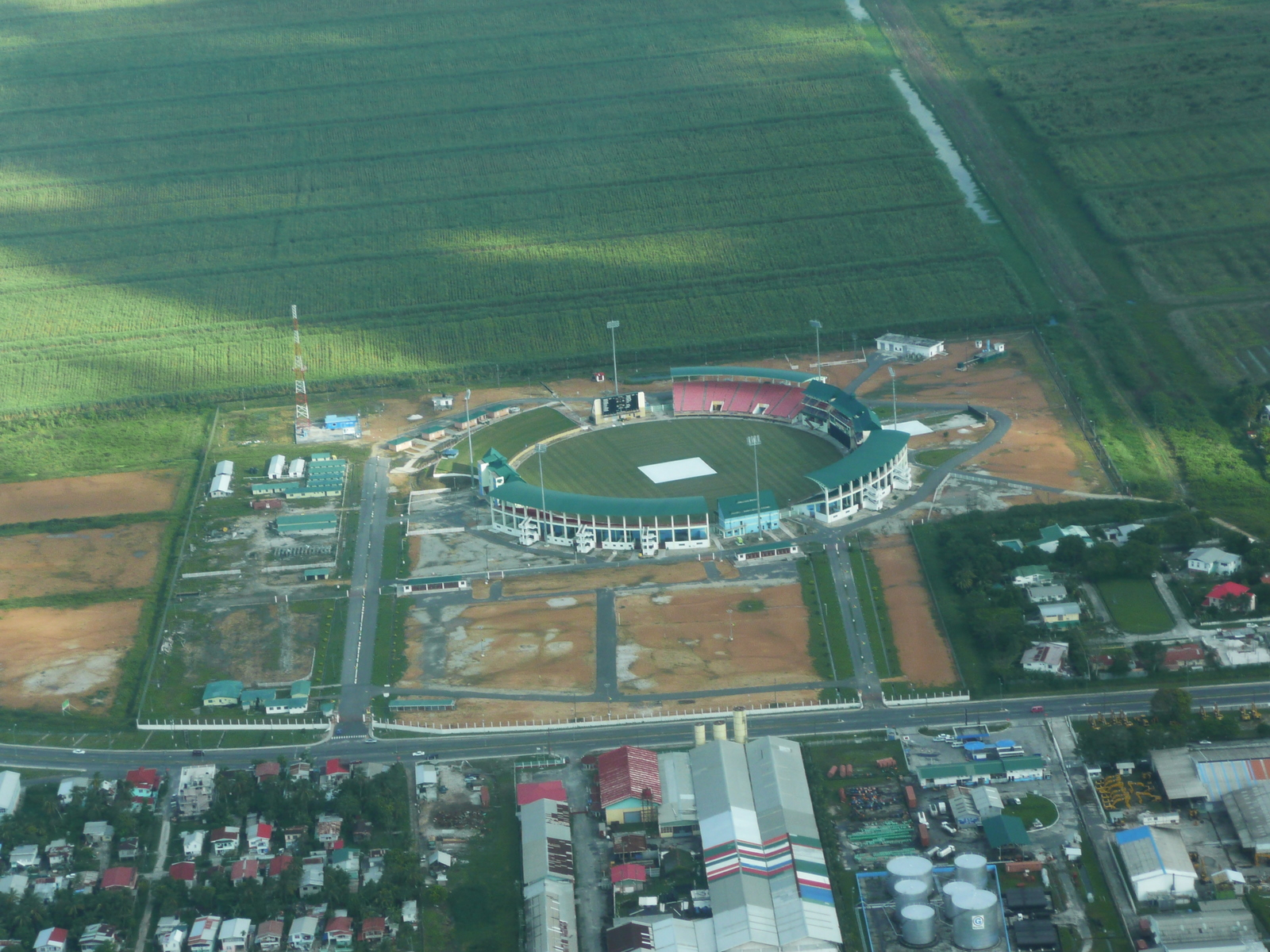
- Providence Stadium from the air

- Location in Guyana
- Coordinates: 6°46′N 58°10′W
- Country: Guyana
- Region: Demerara-Mahaica

Population (2012)
  - Total: 621

Providence is a community in the Demerara-Mahaica Region of Guyana, on the east bank of the Demerara River, located at 6°46′0″N 58°10′0″W, altitude 1 metre (3 feet). Providence is approximately 10 kilometres (6.2 mi) south of the capital, Georgetown.

Providence is the home of the international cricket venue Providence Stadium. It also held few matches of 2007 ICC Cricket World Cup.
