= Kycia Knight =

West Indian cricketer (born 1992)

Personal information
- Full name: Kycia Akira Knight
- Born: 19 February 1992 (age 34); Barbados
- Batting: Left-handed
- Role: Wicket-keeper
- Relatives: Kyshona Knight (twin sister)

International information
- National sides: West Indies (2011–2022); Barbados (2022)
- ODI debut (cap 74): 28 August 2011; West Indies v Pakistan
- Last ODI: 9 December 2022; West Indies v England
- T20I debut (cap 26/6): 6 September 2011; West Indies v Pakistan
- Last T20I: 17 December 2022; West Indies v England

Domestic team information
- Years: Team
- 2004–present: Barbados
- 2022–present: Trinbago Knight Riders

Career statistics
Competition	WODI	WT20I
Matches	87	70
Runs scored	1,327	801
Batting average	17.46	16.68
100s/50s	0/2	0/2
Top score	69	62*
Balls bowled	4	–
Wickets	0	–
Bowling average	–	–
5 wickets in innings	–	–
10 wickets in match	–	–
Best bowling	–	–
Catches/stumpings	29/5	23/11
- Source: ESPNCricinfo, 31 July 2022

Kycia Akira Knight (born 19 February 1992) is a Barbadian cricketer who plays as a wicket-keeper. In October 2018, she was named in the West Indies squad for the 2018 ICC Women's World Twenty20 tournament in the West Indies. In July 2019, Cricket West Indies awarded her with a central contract for the first time, ahead of the 2019–20 season. She plays domestic cricket for Barbados and Trinbago Knight Riders.

In October 2021, she was named in the West Indies team for the 2021 Women's Cricket World Cup Qualifier tournament in Zimbabwe. In February 2022, she was named in the West Indies team for the 2022 Women's Cricket World Cup in New Zealand. In July 2022, she was named in the Barbados team for the cricket tournament at the 2022 Commonwealth Games in Birmingham, England. In January 2024, Knight announced her retirement from international cricket, along with three other West Indies' cricketers, including her twin sister Kyshona Knight, and Anisa Mohammed, and Shakera Selman.
