= Women's Super50 Cup =

- Countries: West Indies
- Administrator: Cricket West Indies (CWI)
- Format: Limited overs cricket (50 overs per side)
- First edition: 1975–76
- Latest edition: 2025
- Next edition: 2027
- Tournament format: Round-robin
- Number of teams: 6
- Current champion: Jamaica (7th title)
- Most successful: Trinidad and Tobago (14 titles)
- 2026 Women's Super50 Cup

The Women's Super50 Cup, officially the West Indies Cricket Board Women's Super50 Cup and previously the Women's Cricket Federation Championships, is a women's domestic one-day cricket competition organised by Cricket West Indies. The tournament began in 1975–76, as a first-class competition, but is now played as a 50-over competition, with six teams taking part: Barbados, Guyana, Jamaica, Leeward Islands, Trinidad and Tobago and Windward Islands. The competition runs alongside the Twenty20 Blaze, a women's Twenty20 cricket competition.

The most successful side in the history of the competition are Trinidad and Tobago, with 14 wins and are the current holders Jamaica the 2026 edition.

== History ==
The tournament began in 1975–76, as the Caribbean Women's Cricket Federation Championships, a two-day competition. Four teams competed: Barbados, Grenada, Jamaica and Trinidad and Tobago, but the winner of the competition is not recorded. Jamaica are the first recorded champions, winning the second tournament in 1977, which involved five teams, with Guyana joining the original four.

Over subsequent years, the tournament changed formats multiple times. In tournaments between 1989 and 1995, both a two-day round robin competition and a 50 over knockout competition were played. Following this, the competition permanently became a 50 over competition, but remained divided into two tournament formats, league and knockout, until 2007. In 2001 the tournament was renamed the West Indies Women's Cricket Federation Championships. From 2009 to 2014, teams played in two groups with a subsequent knockout stage. Following this, the tournament has always been one league stage, sometimes with a final for the top two in the group. In 2016–17 the tournament became the Regional Super50, and 2018–19 it became the Super50 Cup.

The teams competing in the tournament has varied over the years. Saint Lucia joined the competition in 1988, and competed until 2014. Dominica joined in 1996 and competed until 2002, and again from 2008 to 2014. Saint Vincent and the Grenadines competed from 2000 until 2014.

Barbados, Trinidad and Tobago, Jamaica and Guyana have competed in the competition through most of its history, whilst Grenada competed until 2014. In 2015, South Windward Islands and North Windward Islands competed, before being replaced the following season by Windward Islands and Leeward Islands. Finally, a team named North America competed in the competition in 2003.

Tournament results and winners are not fully recorded. However, Trinidad and Tobago are the most successful team based on recorded titles, with 13 wins. Jamaica have won 6 titles, with Barbados winning 5, Saint Lucia 2 and 1 apiece for Grenada and Saint Vincent and the Grenadines.

== Teams ==
Note: numbers of titles not fully known due to incomplete records. Tournaments from 2002 to 2005 included two possible titles, which are counted separately.

Team	First	Last	Titles
Barbados	1975–76	2024	5
Dominica	1995	2014	0
Grenada	1975–76	2014	1
Guyana	1977	2024	0
Jamaica	1975–76	2026	7
Leeward Islands	2016	2024	0
North America	2003	2003	0
North Windward Islands	2015	2015	0
South Windward Islands	2015	2015	0
Saint Lucia	1988	2014	2
Saint Vincent and the Grenadines	2000	2014	1
Trinidad and Tobago	1975–76	2024	13
Windward Islands	2016	2024	0

== Results ==
Season	Winners	Runners-up	Match format	Ref
1975–76	Unknown	Unknown	2 days	
1977	Jamaica	Trinidad and Tobago	2 days	
1980	Unknown	Unknown	50 overs	
1982	Unknown	Unknown	50 overs	
1988	Unknown	Unknown	2 days	
1989	Trinidad and Tobago (50 overs)	Jamaica (50 overs)	2 days + 50 overs	
1990	Grenada (50 overs)	Jamaica (50 overs)	2 days + 50 overs	
1991	Unknown (50 overs)	Unknown (50 overs)	2 days + 50 overs	
1992	Trinidad and Tobago (50 overs)	Jamaica (50 overs)	2 days + 50 overs	
1994	Trinidad and Tobago (50 overs)	Saint Lucia (50 overs)	2 days + 50 overs	
1995	Unknown (50 overs)	Unknown (50 overs)	2 days + 50 overs	
1996	Trinidad and Tobago	Saint Lucia	50 overs	
1998	Saint Lucia	Trinidad and Tobago	50 overs	
1999	Jamaica	Saint Lucia	50 overs	
2000	Unknown	Unknown	50 overs	
2001	Unknown	Unknown	50 overs	
2002	Saint Lucia (League); Trinidad and Tobago (KO)	Trinidad and Tobago (League); Saint Lucia (KO)	50 overs	
2003	Trinidad and Tobago (League + KO)	Saint Lucia (League + KO)	50 overs	
2004	Saint Vincent and the Grenadines (League); Trinidad and Tobago (KO)	Trinidad and Tobago (League); Saint Lucia (KO)	50 overs	
2005	Trinidad and Tobago (League + KO)	Saint Vincent and the Grenadines (League + KO)	50 overs	
2006	Unknown	Unknown	50 overs	
2007	Unknown	Unknown	50 overs	
2008	Unknown	Unknown	50 overs	
2009	Trinidad and Tobago	Jamaica	50 overs	
2010	Trinidad and Tobago	Saint Vincent and the Grenadines	50 overs	
2011	Jamaica	Trinidad and Tobago	50 overs	
2013	Jamaica	Trinidad and Tobago	50 overs	
2014	Jamaica	Guyana	50 overs	
2015	Barbados	Jamaica	50 overs	
2016	Trinidad and Tobago	Barbados	50 overs	
2016–17	Trinidad and Tobago	Barbados	50 overs	
2018	Barbados	Jamaica	50 overs	
2018–19	Barbados	Trinidad and Tobago	50 overs	
2022	Barbados	Jamaica	50 overs	
2023	Barbados	Trinidad and Tobago	50 overs	
2024	Jamaica	Guyana	50 overs	
2025	Trinidad and Tobago	Barbados	50 overs	
2026	Jamaica			

== See also ==
- Super50 Cup
- Women's Twenty20 Blaze
- Women's Caribbean Premier League
