= Kyshona Knight =

West Indian cricketer (born 1992)

Personal information
- Full name: Kyshona Annika Knight
- Born: 19 February 1992 (age 34); Barbados
- Batting: Left-handed
- Bowling: Right-arm medium
- Role: Batter
- Relatives: Kycia Knight (twin sister)

International information
- National sides: West Indies (2013–2022); Barbados (2022)
- ODI debut (cap 77): 13 January 2013; West Indies v South Africa
- Last ODI: 9 December 2022; West Indies v England
- T20I debut (cap 29/7): 19 January 2013; West Indies v South Africa
- Last T20I: 22 December 2022; West Indies v England

Domestic team information
- Years: Team
- 2004–present: Barbados
- 2022–present: Trinbago Knight Riders

Career statistics
Competition	WODI	WT20I
Matches	51	55
Runs scored	851	546
Batting average	21.27	12.14
100s/50s	0/1	0/0
Top score	88	42
Balls bowled	48	–
Wickets	1	–
Bowling average	54.00	–
5 wickets in innings	0	–
10 wickets in match	0	–
Best bowling	1/3	–
Catches/stumpings	17/–	14/–
- Source: ESPNcricinfo, 12 October 2022

Kyshona Annika Knight (born 19 February 1992) is a Barbadian cricketer who plays for Barbados, Trinbago Knight Riders and the West Indies as a left-handed batter. Her twin sister, Kycia, also plays for Barbados and the West Indies.

In October 2021, she was named in the West Indies team for the 2021 Women's Cricket World Cup Qualifier tournament in Zimbabwe. In July 2022, she was named in the Barbados team for the cricket tournament at the 2022 Commonwealth Games in Birmingham, England. In January 2024, Knight announced her retirement from international cricket, along with three other West Indies' women cricketers, including her twin sister Kycia Knight, Anisa Mohammed, and Shakera Selman.
