= Erva Giddings =

Guyanese cricketer (born 1986)

Personal information
- Full name: Erva Minerva Giddings
- Born: 17 January 1986 (age 40); Guyana
- Batting: Left-handed
- Bowling: Left-arm medium
- Role: Bowler

International information
- National side: West Indies (2016)
- ODI debut (cap 82): 8 October 2016 v England
- Last ODI: 10 October 2016 v England

Domestic team information
- Years: Team
- 2009–2022: Guyana

Career statistics
Competition	WODI
Matches	2
Runs scored	4
Batting average	4.00
100s/50s	0/0
Top score	3
Balls bowled	60
Wickets	1
Bowling average	22.00
5 wickets in innings	0
10 wickets in match	0
Best bowling	1/7
Catches/stumpings	1/–
- Source: ESPNCricinfo, 21 May 2021

Erva Minerva Giddings (born 17 January 1986) is a Guyanese cricketer who plays as a left-arm medium bowler. In 2016, she played two One Day Internationals for the West Indies.

== Career ==
Giddings was first named in a West Indies squad for the 2008 tour of Pakistan, which was later scrapped due to security concerns.

She was selected in the West Indies squad for the home WODI series against England in 2016. During the home series, she eventually made her WODI debut at the age of 30 in the first match of the five match series.
