= Shakera Selman =

West Indian cricketer

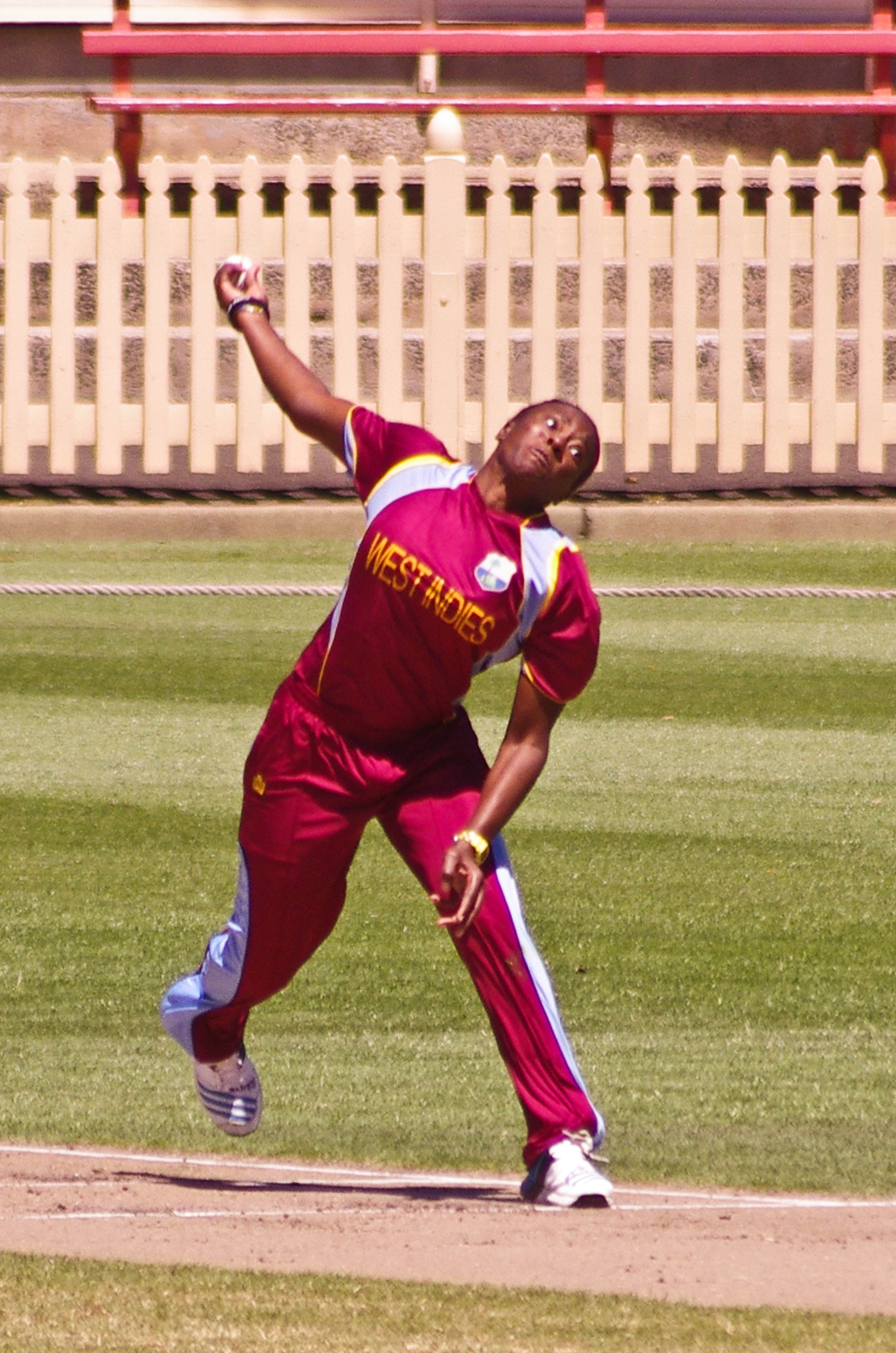

Personal information
- Full name: Shakera Casandra Selman
- Born: 1 September 1989 (age 37); Barbados
- Batting: Right-handed
- Bowling: Right-arm medium
- Role: Bowler

International information
- National sides: West Indies (2008–2023); Barbados (2022)
- ODI debut (cap 58): 24 June 2008; West Indies v Ireland
- Last ODI: 9 December 2022; West Indies v England
- ODI shirt no.: 4
- T20I debut (cap 9/10): 27 June 2008; West Indies v Ireland
- Last T20I: 15 February 2023; West Indies v India

Domestic team information
- Years: Team
- 2005–present: Barbados
- 2013: Surrey
- 2019: Trailblazers
- 2020: Supernovas
- 2022: Barbados Royals
- 2023–present: Guyana Amazon Warriors

Career statistics
Competition	WODI	WT20I
Matches	100	96
Runs scored	249	61
Batting average	10.37	8.71
100s/50s	0/0	0/0
Top score	22	12*
Balls bowled	3,657	1,476
Wickets	82	51
Bowling average	27.10	28.23
5 wickets in innings	1	0
10 wickets in match	0	0
Best bowling	5/15	3/23
Catches/stumpings	31/–	26/–
- Source: ESPNcricinfo, 22 January 2024

Shakera Casandra Selman (born 1 September 1989) is a Barbadian cricketer who plays as a right-arm medium bowler. In October 2018, Cricket West Indies (CWI) awarded her a women's contract for the 2018–19 season. Later the same month, she was named in the West Indies' squad for the 2018 ICC Women's World Twenty20 tournament in the West Indies. In January 2020, she was named in West Indies' squad for the 2020 ICC Women's T20 World Cup in Australia. In May 2021, Selman was awarded with a central contract from Cricket West Indies. She plays domestic cricket for Barbados and Barbados Royals, and has previously played for Surrey, Trailblazers and Supernovas.

In October 2021, she was named in the West Indies team for the 2021 Women's Cricket World Cup Qualifier tournament in Zimbabwe. In February 2022, she was named in the West Indies team for the 2022 Women's Cricket World Cup in New Zealand. In July 2022, she was named in the Barbados team for the cricket tournament at the 2022 Commonwealth Games in Birmingham, England. In January 2024, Selman announced her retirement from international cricket, along with three other West Indies' cricketers including Anisa Mohammed and twin sisters Kycia and Kyshona Knight.
