= Juliana Nero =

West Indies cricketer (born 1979)

Personal information
- Full name: Juliana Barbara Nero
- Born: 14 July 1979 (age 47); Saint Vincent
- Batting: Right-handed
- Bowling: Right-arm medium
- Role: Batter

International information
- National side: West Indies (2003–2013)
- Only Test (cap 26): 15 March 2004 v Pakistan
- ODI debut (cap 41): 13 March 2003 v Sri Lanka
- Last ODI: 26 February 2013 v Sri Lanka
- T20I debut (cap 8): 27 June 2008 v Ireland
- Last T20I: 24 October 2013 v England

Domestic team information
- Years: Team
- 2001–2014: Saint Vincent and the Grenadines
- 2015: South Windward Islands
- 2016–2018/19: Windward Islands

Career statistics
Competition	WTest	WODI	WT20I
Matches	1	76	45
Runs scored	33	1,243	589
Batting average	16.50	18.27	14.72
100s/50s	0/0	1/4	0/0
Top score	32	100	44
Balls bowled	12	78	–
Wickets	0	4	–
Bowling average	–	16.75	–
5 wickets in innings	0	0	–
10 wickets in match	0	0	–
Best bowling	–	3/25	–
Catches/stumpings	0/–	27/–	14/–
- Source: ESPNCricinfo, 14 May 2021

Juliana Barbara Nero (born 14 June 1979) is a Vincentian former cricketer who played as a right-handed batter. Between 2003 and 2013, she played one Test match, 76 One Day Internationals and 45 Twenty20 Internationals for the West Indies, including appearing at the 2005 and 2013 World Cups. She played domestic cricket for Saint Vincent and the Grenadines and Windward Islands.
