= Stacy-Ann King =

West Indian cricketer

Personal information
- Full name: Stacy-Ann Camille-Ann King
- Born: 17 July 1983 (age 43); Trinidad
- Batting: Left-handed
- Bowling: Left-arm medium
- Role: All-rounder

International information
- National side: West Indies (2008–2019)
- ODI debut (cap 56): 24 June 2008 v Ireland
- Last ODI: 6 November 2019 v India
- T20I debut (cap 4): 27 June 2008 v Ireland
- Last T20I: 17 November 2019 v India

Domestic team information
- Years: Team
- 2009–2018/19: Trinidad and Tobago
- 2015/16: Adelaide Strikers

Career statistics
Competition	WODI	WT20I
Matches	75	86
Runs scored	885	989
Batting average	15.00	17.05
100s/50s	0/1	0/3
Top score	70	81
Balls bowled	1,134	491
Wickets	22	18
Bowling average	40.13	29.00
5 wickets in innings	0	0
10 wickets in match	0	0
Best bowling	3/33	3/19
Catches/stumpings	35/–	32/–
- Source: Cricinfo, 21 May 2021

Stacy-Ann Camille-Ann King (born 17 July 1983) is a Trinidadian former cricketer who played as an all-rounder, batting left-handed and bowling left-arm medium. Between 2009 and 2019, she appeared in 75 One Day Internationals and 86 Twenty20 Internationals for the West Indies. She played domestic cricket for Trinidad and Tobago and Adelaide Strikers.

In 2010, along with Tremayne Smartt, she set the record for the highest third wicket partnership in a Twenty20 International, with 124 runs: they held the record for 9 years, and it is now the third-highest partnership for the third wicket. In July 2019, Cricket West Indies awarded her with a central contract for the first time, ahead of the 2019–20 season.

She graduated from the University of Trinidad and Tobago in 2020 with a bachelor's degree in sports studies.
