= Afy Fletcher =

Grenadian cricketer (born 1987)

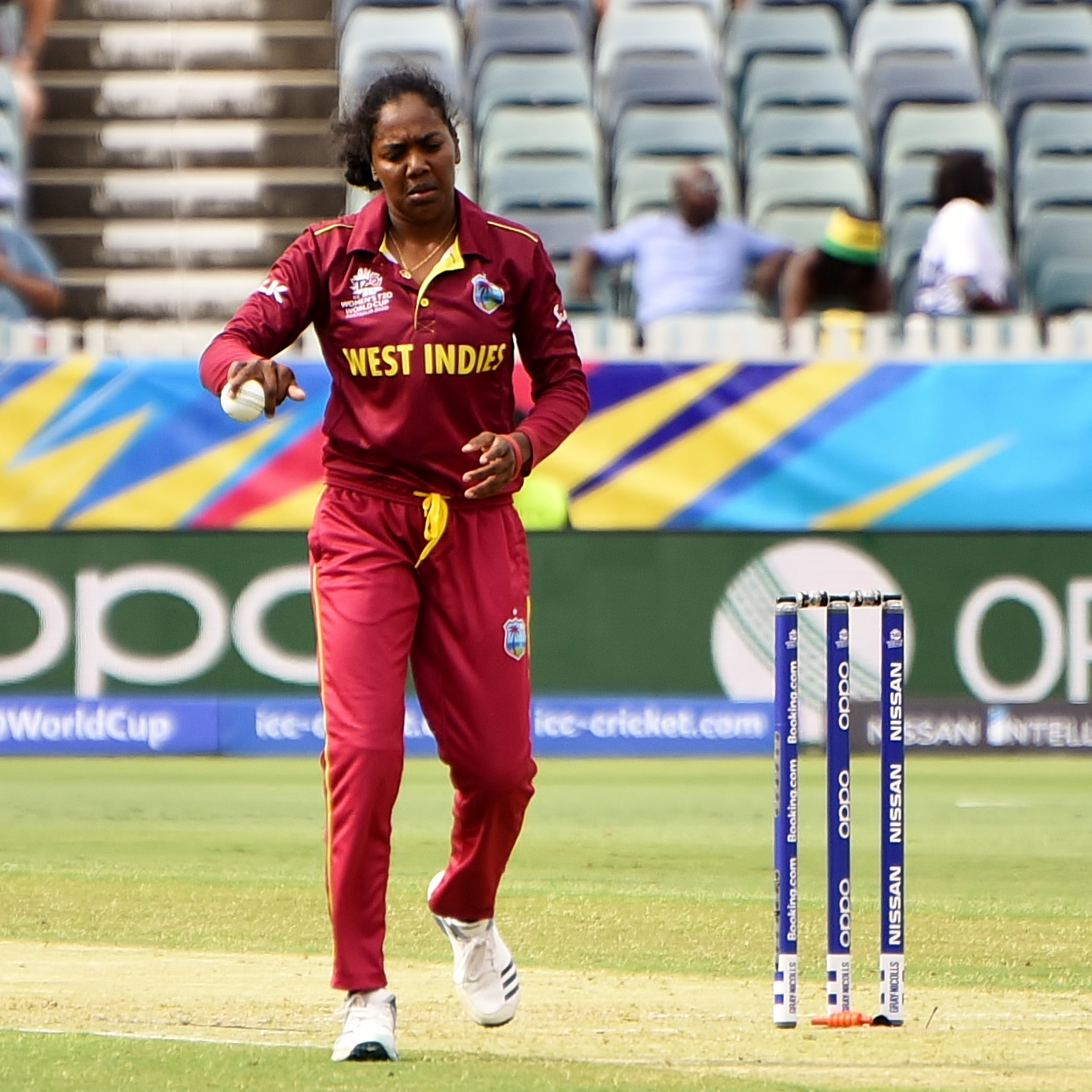
- Fletcher playing for the West Indies during the 2020 ICC Women's T20 World Cup

Personal information
- Full name: Afy Samantha Sharlyn Fletcher
- Born: 17 March 1987 (age 39); La Fillette, Saint Andrew Parish, Grenada
- Batting: Right-handed
- Bowling: Right-arm leg break
- Role: Bowler

International information
- National side: West Indies (2008–present)
- ODI debut (cap 61): 29 June 2008 v Ireland
- Last ODI: 22 June 2024 v Sri Lanka
- T20I debut (cap 12): 1 July 2008 v Netherlands
- Last T20I: 18 October 2024 v New Zealand
- T20I shirt no.: 9

Domestic team information
- Years: Team
- 2002–2014: Grenada
- 2015: South Windward Islands
- 2016–present: Windward Islands
- 2022–present: Barbados Royals

Career statistics
Competition	WODI	WT20I
Matches	73	87
Runs scored	350	206
Batting average	9.21	8.95
100s/50s	0/0	0/0
Top score	36*	19
Balls bowled	2,950	1,639
Wickets	86	83
Bowling average	23.24	19.98
5 wickets in innings	0	1
10 wickets in match	0	0
Best bowling	4/22	5/13
Catches/stumpings	16/–	15/–
- Source: ESPNcricinfo, 19 October 2024

Afy Samantha Sharlyn Fletcher (born 17 March 1987) is a Grenadian cricketer who represents the West Indies internationally. A right-arm leg-spin bowler, she made her international debut in 2008. She plays domestic cricket for Windward Islands and Barbados Royals.

Fletcher made her international debut at the age of 21, in a One Day International (ODI) match against Ireland in June 2008. On debut, she took 4/22 from nine overs, setting a new record for the best figures by a West Indian on her ODI debut. Her Twenty20 International debut came the following month, against the Netherlands. At the 2009 World Cup in Australia, Fletcher featured in five of her team's seven matches, but took only two wickets. After the World Cup, she was not recalled to the West Indian squad for over six years. She returned to international cricket in May 2015, playing a series against Sri Lanka. The following year, Fletcher was a member of the West Indian team that won the 2016 World Twenty20 in India, their first world title. She took seven wickets from six matches, including 3/12 against England and 2/16 against India, and finished the tournament ranked equal fifth for overall wickets taken.

In October 2018, Cricket West Indies (CWI) awarded her a women's contract for the 2018–19 season. Later the same month, she was named in the West Indies' squad for the 2018 ICC Women's World Twenty20 tournament in the West Indies. In January 2020, she was named in West Indies' squad for the 2020 ICC Women's T20 World Cup in Australia. In May 2021, Fletcher was awarded with a central contract from Cricket West Indies. In February 2022, she was named in the West Indies team for the 2022 Women's Cricket World Cup in New Zealand.

She was named in the West Indies squad for the 2024 ICC Women's T20 World Cup.

Fletcher was part of the West Indies squad for the 2025 Women's Cricket World Cup Qualifier in Pakistan in April 2025.
