= Vanessa Watts =

Jamaican cricketer (born 1987)

Personal information
- Full name: Vanessa Nakeita Watts
- Born: 12 August 1987 (age 39); Jamaica
- Batting: Right handed
- Bowling: Right-arm off break
- Role: Bowler

International information
- National side: West Indies (2014)
- Only ODI (cap 79): 26 February 2014 v New Zealand
- T20I debut (cap 32): 1 March 2014 v New Zealand
- Last T20I: 9 March 2014 v New Zealand

Domestic team information
- Years: Team
- 2009–present: Jamaica
- 2023–present: Barbados Royals

Career statistics
Competition	WODI	WT20I
Matches	1	4
Runs scored	18	25
Batting average	18.00	8.33
100s/50s	0/0	0/0
Top score	18	16
Balls bowled	60	60
Wickets	1	2
Bowling average	43.00	32.00
5 wickets in innings	0	0
10 wickets in match	0	0
Best bowling	1/43	1/22
Catches/stumpings	0/–	1/–
- Source: ESPN Cricinfo, 20 May 2021

Vanessa Nakeita Watts (born 12 August 1987) is a Jamaican cricketer who plays as a right-arm off break bowler. In early 2014 she made her international debut, appearing in one One Day International and four Twenty20 Internationals for the West Indies. She plays domestic cricket for Jamaica.
