= Windward Islands women's cricket team =

Windward Islands

Personnel
- Captain: Afy Fletcher
- Coach: Petra Lynch

Team information
- Colours: Green
- Founded: First recorded match: 2016

History
- S50 wins: 0
- T20 Blaze wins: 0

The Windward Islands women's cricket team is the women's cricket team representing the member countries of the Windward Islands Cricket Board of Control: Dominica, Grenada, Saint Lucia and Saint Vincent and the Grenadines. They compete in the Women's Super50 Cup and the Twenty20 Blaze.

Until 2014, the countries that make up the Windward Islands competed separately in the two competitions. In 2015, two teams named South Windward Islands and North Windward Islands competed before the current team began playing in 2016.

== History ==
The Windward Islands joined the West Indies domestic structure in 2016, playing in the Regional Women's Championship and the Regional Women's Twenty20 Championship. They finished fifth out of six in the 50-over competition and fourth in the T20 competition.

Prior to this, the countries that now make up the Windward Islands team had competed separately, with Grenada joining the domestic structure for its inaugural season in 1975–76, Saint Lucia joining in 1988, Dominica in 1995 and Saint Vincent and the Grenadines in 2000. St Lucia won two 50-over titles, and Grenada and St Vincent won one apiece. The four individual teams competed in their final season in 2014, and in 2015 were replaced in the 50-over competition by South Windward Islands and North Windward Islands. The South team finished 4th out of 6 with two wins, whilst the North team finished bottom with no victories.

Since 2016, the now-unified Windward Islands team have competed in every edition of both the 50-over and T20 competitions. They achieved their best finish in the 50-over competition in the 2016–17 season, finishing 3rd with 3 wins. In 2023, the side finished third in both competitions, equalling their best 50-over finish and achieving their best T20 finish.

== Players ==
=== Current squad ===
Based on squad announced for the 2023 season. Players in bold have international caps.

| Name | Nationality | Birth date | Batting style | Bowling style | Notes |
Batters
| Kimone Homer | West Indies | Unknown | Left-handed | Unknown | |
| Namiah Marcellin | West Indies | Unknown | Unknown | Unknown | |
All-rounders
| Tracy Byron | West Indies | Unknown | Right-handed | Right-arm medium | |
| Malika Edward | West Indies | 18 November 1992 (age 32) | Left-handed | Left-arm medium | |
| **Afy Fletcher** | West Indies | 17 March 1987 (age 38) | Right-handed | Right-arm leg break | Captain |
| **Zaida James** | West Indies | 30 October 2004 (age 20) | Left-handed | Slow left-arm orthodox | |
| Japhina Joseph | West Indies | Unknown | Right-handed | Right-arm medium | |
Wicket-keepers
| Earnisha Fontaine | West Indies | 31 March 2004 (age 20) | Right-handed | – | |
Bowlers
| **Nerissa Crafton** | West Indies | 23 July 1998 (age 26) | Left-handed | Right-arm fast-medium | |
| **Pearl Etienne** | West Indies | 6 July 1982 (age 42) | Right-handed | Right-arm medium | |
| Amiah Gilbert | West Indies | Unknown | Unknown | Right-arm off break | |
| **Jannillea Glasgow** | West Indies | Unknown | Left-handed | Left-arm medium | |
| **Qiana Joseph** | West Indies | 1 January 2001 (age 24) | Left-handed | Left-arm fast-medium | |
| Carena Noel | West Indies | 25 September 1994 (age 30) | Left-handed | Right-arm off break | |
| Abini St Jean | West Indies | 1 September 2004 (age 20) | Right-handed | Right-arm leg break | |

=== Notable players ===
Players who have played for the Windward Islands and played internationally are listed below, in order of first international appearance (given in brackets):

- (Cricket West Indies) Juliana Nero (2003)
- (Cricket West Indies) Cordel Jack (2005)
- (Cricket West Indies) Afy Fletcher (2008)
- (Cricket West Indies) Pearl Etienne (2010)
- (Cricket West Indies) Qiana Joseph (2017)
- (Cricket West Indies) Akeira Peters (2017)
- (Cricket West Indies) Zaida James (2023)
- (Cricket West Indies) Jannillea Glasgow (2023)
- (Cricket West Indies) Nerissa Crafton (2024)

== Honours ==
- Women's Super50 Cup:
  - Winners (0):
  - Best finish: 3rd (2016–17 & 2023)
- Twenty20 Blaze:
  - Winners (0):
  - Best finish: 3rd (2023)

== See also ==
- Windward Islands cricket team
- Dominica women's national cricket team
- Grenada women's national cricket team
- Saint Lucia women's national cricket team
- Saint Vincent and the Grenadines women's national cricket team
