= Shemaine Campbelle =

West Indian cricketer (born 1992)

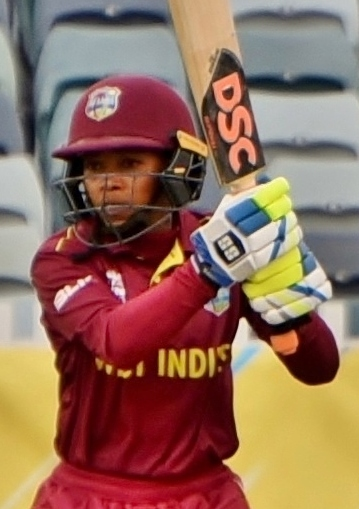
- Campbelle batting for the West Indies during the 2020 ICC Women's T20 World Cup

Personal information
- Full name: Shemaine Altia Campbelle
- Born: 14 October 1992 (age 34); Port Mourant, Berbice, Guyana
- Batting: Right-handed
- Bowling: Right-arm medium-fast
- Role: All-rounder; Occasional wicket-keeper

International information
- National side: West Indies (2009–present)
- ODI debut (cap 68): 21 October 2009 v South Africa
- Last ODI: 21 June 2024 v Sri Lanka
- T20I debut (cap 20): 25 October 2009 v South Africa
- Last T20I: 18 October 2024 v New Zealand
- T20I shirt no.: 30

Domestic team information
- Years: Team
- 2009–present: Guyana
- 2022–present: Guyana Amazon Warriors

Career statistics
Competition	WODI	WT20I
Matches	136	155
Runs scored	1,983	1,621
Batting average	19.63	16.37
100s/50s	1/5	0/1
Top score	105	90
Balls bowled	1,277	793
Wickets	21	34
Bowling average	35.85	19.88
5 wickets in innings	0	0
10 wickets in match	0	0
Best bowling	2/13	3/7
Catches/stumpings	53/8	35/25
- Source: ESPNCricinfo, 13 June 2026

Shemaine Altia Campbelle (born 14 October 1992) is a Guyanese cricketer who plays as an all-rounder and occasional wicket-keeper. She plays internationally for the West Indies and domestic cricket for Guyana and Guyana Amazon Warriors.

Campbelle is the first and only woman cricketer to score a century in an ODI when batting at number 7 or lower and also has the highest score for any batswoman in a Women's ODI innings when batting at number 7 position or lower, with 105 not out. She is the youngest captain to play in WT20I match, aged 19 years and 338 days.

She was also part of the victorious ICC Women's World T20 campaign of West Indies in 2016.

In October 2018, Cricket West Indies (CWI) awarded her a women's contract for the 2018–19 season. Later the same month, she was named in the West Indies' squad for the 2018 ICC Women's World Twenty20 tournament in the West Indies. In January 2020, she was named in West Indies' squad for the 2020 ICC Women's T20 World Cup in Australia. In their opening match of the tournament, against Thailand, Campbelle played in her 100th WT20I match. In May 2021, Campbelle was awarded with a central contract from Cricket West Indies.

In October 2021, she was named in the West Indies team for the 2021 Women's Cricket World Cup Qualifier tournament in Zimbabwe. In February 2022, she was named in the West Indies team for the 2022 Women's Cricket World Cup in New Zealand.

She was named in the West Indies squad for the 2024 ICC Women's T20 World Cup.

Campbelle was part of the West Indies squad for the 2025 Women's Cricket World Cup Qualifier in Pakistan in April 2025.
