= 2024 Men's T20 World Cup final =

International cricket match

2024 ICC Men's T20 World Cup final
- Match programme cover
- Event: 2024 ICC Men's T20 World Cup
India	South Africa
176/7	169/8
20 overs	20 overs
- India won by 7 runs
- Date: 29 June 2024 10:30 UTC−4
- Venue: Kensington Oval, Bridgetown
- Player of the match: Virat Kohli (Ind)
- Umpires: Chris Gaffaney (NZ) and Richard Illingworth (Eng)
- Attendance: 28,000

The 2024 ICC Men's T20 World Cup final was a Twenty20 International (T20I) cricket match played at Kensington Oval in Bridgetown, Barbados on 29 June 2024 to determine the winner of the 2024 ICC Men's T20 World Cup. It was played between South Africa and India.

India won the toss and electing to bat first, they registered a score of 176/7. In the second innings, South Africa managed to post a score of 169/8 thus India claimed the victory by 7 runs to win their second T20 World Cup title. Virat Kohli was named Player of the Match for scoring 76 runs off 59 balls. Following the victory, Kohli, Indian captain Rohit Sharma and Ravindra Jadeja announced their retirement from T20I cricket.

== Background ==
The 2024 ICC Men's T20 World Cup was the ninth edition of the ICC Men's T20 World Cup, a biennial world cup for cricket in Twenty20 International (T20I) format, organized by the International Cricket Council (ICC). In November 2021 as part of the 2024-2031 ICC men's hosts cycle, the ICC announced that the 2024 ICC Men's T20 World Cup would be played in the United States and the West Indies.

On 22 September 2023, the ICC released the venues that would host matches across the tournament, with the Kensington Oval in Barbados named as the venue for the final. On 5 January 2024, the ICC announced the tournament's schedule, with the final scheduled on 29 June. This was the second T20 World Cup final played at the stadium, after the 2010 final.

This was South Africa's maiden T20 World Cup final, while it was India's third final, having been champions in 2007 and runners-up in 2014. Both teams qualified for the final unbeaten, with neither of them losing a group stage, Super 8 or semi-final. Before this match, India and South Africa had played each other six times in the ICC Men's T20 World Cup, with India recording four wins (2007, 2010, 2012 and 2014) and South Africa winning two (2009 and 2022).

== Road to the final ==
=== Overview ===
- Source: ESPNcricinfo

South Africa				vs	India
Opponent	Date	Result	Points	Match	Opponent	Date	Result	Points
Group D				Group stage	Group A
Sri Lanka	2 June 2024	Won	2	1	Ireland	5 June 2024	Won	2
Netherlands	8 June 2024	Won	4	2	Pakistan	9 June 2024	Won	4
Bangladesh	10 June 2024	Won	6	3	United States	12 June 2024	Won	6
Nepal	14 June 2024	Won	8	4	Canada	15 June 2024	N/R	7
Group 2				Super 8 stage	Group 1
United States	19 June 2024	Won	2	5	Afghanistan	20 June 2024	Won	2
England	21 June 2024	Won	4	6	Bangladesh	22 June 2024	Won	4
West Indies	23 June 2024	Won (DLS)	6	7	Australia	24 June 2024	Won	6
Semi-final 1				Knockout stage	Semi-final 2
Afghanistan	26 June 2024	Won		SF	England	27 June 2024	Won
2024 ICC Men's T20 World Cup final

=== South Africa ===
South Africa began their T20 World Cup campaign with a victory over Sri Lanka at Nassau County International Cricket Stadium in New York, and went on to defeat Netherlands and Bangladesh at the same venue. After defeating Nepal at Arnos Vale, they finished the group stage as Group D winners. In the Super 8 stage, they defeated co-hosts United States at Sir Vivian Richards Stadium in North Sound, defending champions England at Daren Sammy Cricket Ground in Gros Islet, and former champions and co-hosts West Indies at North Sound, finishing as winners of Group 2.

South Africa then defeated Afghanistan in the semi-final 1 at the Brian Lara Cricket Academy in San Fernando, Trinidad and Tobago to qualify for their maiden T20 World Cup final.

=== India ===
India began their T20 World Cup campaign with a victory over Ireland at Nassau County International Cricket Stadium, and went on to defeat Pakistan and co-hosts United States at the same venue. Their match with Canada was abandoned for heavy rainfall at the Central Broward Park in Florida, and India finished the group stage as winners of Group A. In the Super 8 stage, they defeated Afghanistan at Kensington Oval in Barbados, Bangladesh in North Sound, and Australia in Gros Islet, finishing as winners of Group 1.

India then defeated defending champions England in the semi-final 2 at the Providence Stadium in Guyana to qualify for their third T20 World Cup final.

== Match ==
=== Match officials ===
On 28 June 2024, the ICC named New Zealand's Chris Gaffaney and England's Richard Illingworth as the on-field umpires, along with England's Richard Kettleborough as the third umpire, Australia's Rod Tucker as the reserve umpire, and West Indies' Richie Richardson as match referee.

- On-field umpires: Chris Gaffaney (NZ) and Richard Illingworth (Eng)
- TV umpire: Richard Kettleborough (Eng)
- Reserve umpire: Rod Tucker (Aus)
- Match referee: Richie Richardson (WI)

=== Team and toss ===
Both teams remained unchanged from their semi-final matches. India's captain Rohit Sharma won the toss and elected to bat first.

- India: Rohit Sharma (c), Virat Kohli, Rishabh Pant (wk), Suryakumar Yadav, Axar Patel, Shivam Dube, Hardik Pandya, Ravindra Jadeja, Kuldeep Yadav, Arshdeep Singh, Jasprit Bumrah
- South Africa: Reeza Hendricks, Quinton de Kock (wk), Aiden Markram (c), Tristan Stubbs, Heinrich Klaasen, David Miller, Marco Jansen, Keshav Maharaj, Kagiso Rabada, Anrich Nortje, Tabraiz Shamsi

=== India innings ===
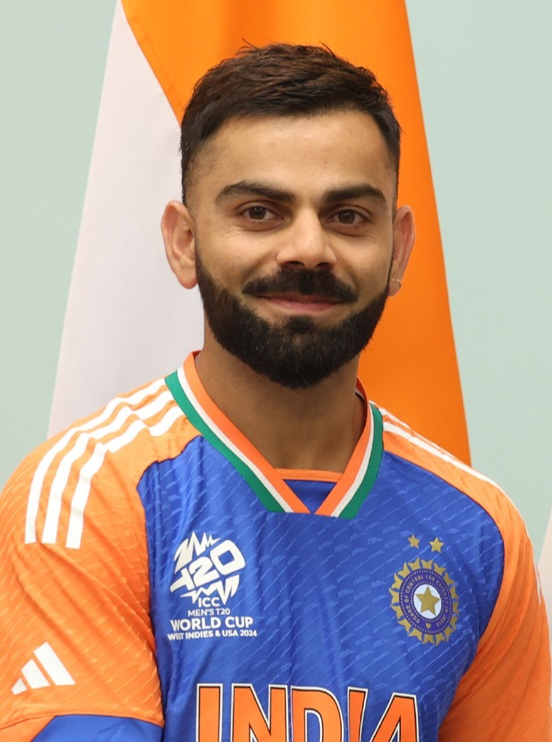
Virat Kohli scored the most runs for India in the match (76 runs off of 59 balls) and was awarded the Player of the match.

Put to bat first, India lost three early wickets for single-digit scores including captain Rohit Sharma. Virat Kohli and Axar Patel steadied the game with a 72-run partnership in 9 overs. Following Patel's dismissal in the 14th over, Shivam Dube managed a 57-run partnership with Kohli until the latter's dismissal in the penultimate over. In the last over, South Africa took two wickets to restrict India to 176 runs for the loss of 7 wickets. Kohli was the highest run-scorer for India with 76 runs from 59 balls while Keshav Maharaj and Anrich Nortje picked up two wickets each for South Africa. Kohli later received the player of the match award.

=== South Africa innings ===
Chasing the target of 177, South Africa lost two early wickets for single-digit scores including captain Aiden Markram. Quinton de Kock and Tristan Stubbs put on a 58-run partnership until the latter's dismissal in the ninth over. Heinrich Klaasen put on a 36-run partnership with de Kock and a 45-run partnership with David Miller to get to his half-century in 23 balls. In the last four overs, India took four wickets while giving away only 18 runs to restrict South Africa to 169 runs for the loss of 8 wickets. Klaasen was the highest run-scorer for South Africa with 52 runs from 27 balls while Hardik Pandya took three wickets for India.

=== Match details ===
29 June 2024
10:30 UTC−4
Scorecard

India; 176/7 (20 overs)	v	South Africa; 169/8 (20 overs)
Virat Kohli 76 (59); Keshav Maharaj 2/23 (3 overs)		Heinrich Klaasen 52 (27); Hardik Pandya 3/20 (3 overs)

India won by 7 runs
Kensington Oval, Bridgetown
Attendance: 28,000
Umpires: Chris Gaffaney (NZ) and Richard Illingworth (Eng)
Player of the match: Virat Kohli (Ind)

- India won the toss and elected to bat.
- This was South Africa's maiden appearance and India's third appearance at the T20 World Cup final.
- Hardik Pandya (Ind) played in his 100th T20I.
- Virat Kohli, Rohit Sharma and Ravindra Jadeja (Ind) all played their last T20I match.
- India scored the highest-ever total in the final of the T20 World Cup (176), surpassing the score of 172 set by New Zealand in 2021.
- Arshdeep Singh (Ind) equalled the record of Fazalhaq Farooqi (Afg) for taking the most wickets in a single edition of the T20 World Cup (17).
- India won their second T20 World Cup title, equalling the West Indies and England in most tournaments won. India also broke the record of the longest time between successive tournament wins (17 years), breaking the record of 12 years set by England.
- Rohit Sharma (Ind) became the first Indian player to win the T20 World Cup twice, and the first captain to win 50 T20I matches.
- India also became the first team to win the T20 World Cup by winning 8 matches without losing.

Match scorecard

1st innings

India batting
Player	Status	Runs	Balls	4s	6s	Strike rate
Rohit Sharma	c Klaasen b Maharaj	9	5	2	0	180.00
Virat Kohli	c Rabada b Jansen	76	59	6	2	128.81
Rishabh Pant	c de Kock b Maharaj	0	2	0	0	0.00
Suryakumar Yadav	c Klaasen b Rabada	3	4	0	0	75.00
Axar Patel	run out (de Kock)	47	31	1	4	151.61
Shivam Dube	c Miller b Nortje	27	16	3	1	168.75
Hardik Pandya	not out	5	2	1	0	250.00
Ravindra Jadeja	c Maharaj b Nortje	2	2	0	0	100.00
Kuldeep Yadav	did not bat					
Arshdeep Singh	did not bat					
Jasprit Bumrah	did not bat					
Extras	(nb 1, w 6)	7				
Total	(7 wickets; 20 overs)	176		13	7	RR: 8.80

Fall of wickets: 1/23 (Rohit, 1.4 ov), 2/23 (Pant, 1.6 ov), 3/34 (Suryakumar, 4.3 ov), 4/106 (Patel, 13.3 ov), 5/163 (Kohli, 18.5 ov), 6/174 (Dube, 19.4 ov), 7/176 (Jadeja, 19.6 ov)

South Africa bowling
Bowler	Overs	Maidens	Runs	Wickets	Econ	Wides	NBs
Marco Jansen	4	0	49	1	12.25	1	1
Keshav Maharaj	3	0	23	2	7.66	0	0
Kagiso Rabada	4	0	36	1	9.00	2	0
Aiden Markram	2	0	16	0	8.00	0	0
Anrich Nortje	4	0	26	2	6.50	2	0
Tabraiz Shamsi	3	0	26	0	8.66	1	0

2nd innings

South Africa batting
Player	Status	Runs	Balls	4s	6s	Strike rate
Reeza Hendricks	b Bumrah	4	5	1	0	80.00
Quinton de Kock	c Kuldeep b Arshdeep	39	31	4	1	125.80
Aiden Markram	c Pant b Arshdeep	4	5	1	0	80.00
Tristan Stubbs	b Patel	31	21	3	1	147.61
Heinrich Klaasen	c Pant b Pandya	52	27	2	5	192.59
David Miller	c Suryakumar b Pandya	21	17	1	1	123.52
Marco Jansen	b Bumrah	2	4	0	0	50.00
Keshav Maharaj	not out	2	7	0	0	28.57
Kagiso Rabada	c Suryakumar b Pandya	4	3	1	0	133.33
Anrich Nortje	not out	1	1	0	0	100.00
Tabraiz Shamsi	did not bat					
Extras	(b 1, lb 4, nb 1, w 3)	9				
Total	(8 wickets; 20 overs)	169		13	8	RR: 8.45

Fall of wickets: 1/7 (Hendricks, 1.3 ov), 2/12 (Markram, 2.3 ov), 3/70 (Stubbs, 8.5 ov), 4/106 (de Kock, 12.3 ov), 5/151 (Klaasen, 16.1 ov), 6/156 (Jansen, 17.4 ov), 7/161 (Miller, 19.1 ov), 8/168 (Rabada, 19.5 ov)

India bowling
Bowler	Overs	Maidens	Runs	Wickets	Econ	Wides	NBs
Arshdeep Singh	4	0	20	2	5.00	0	0
Jasprit Bumrah	4	0	18	2	4.50	0	0
Axar Patel	4	0	49	1	12.25	2	0
Kuldeep Yadav	4	0	45	0	11.25	0	0
Hardik Pandya	3	0	20	3	6.66	1	1
Ravindra Jadeja	1	0	12	0	12.00	0	0

== Aftermath ==
=== Post-match ===
This was India's second T20 World Cup victory after their first win in 2007 and first win in a major ICC event in 11 years, with their previous win being the 2013 ICC Champions Trophy. India became the first Asian country to win two T20 World Cups (2007 and 2024). India also became the first team in the T20 World Cup history to win the title undefeated throughout the tournament. Rohit Sharma became the third Indian captain to win a major ICC event after Kapil Dev in 1983 and MS Dhoni in 2007, 2011 and 2013.

India received $2.45 million and South Africa received $1.28 million in prize money from the ICC. Following India's victory, captain Sharma, Virat Kohli and Ravindra Jadeja announced their retirement from the T20I cricket. Rahul Dravid's tenure as India's head coach came to an end after this tournament.

=== Reaction ===
Suryakumar Yadav took the catch of David Miller in the final with his left foot close to the boundary cushion. Action replays suggested that it was a fair and clean catch, as confirmed by the third umpire. Subsequently, some netizens on social media made unverified speculation that his shoe might have flicked the boundary cushion, before a new video showing the catch from a different angle dispelled the doubts and confirmed the catch's validity. The catch was also widely likened to that of former Indian captain Kapil Dev in the 1983 Cricket World Cup final, where he took a running catch to dismiss West Indies' batsman Vivian Richards.

South Africa faced criticism for choking in the closing phase of the match, as they were favoured to chase down the total comfortably at one stage. South Africa captain Aiden Markram admitted that the defeat was a tough pill to swallow and described it as a "gut-wrenching and bittersweet ending to a great campaign", but heaped praise on his teammates who had helped the team reach the final as one of only two unbeaten sides of the tournament.

Indian President Droupadi Murmu and Prime Minister Narendra Modi congratulated team India on winning the tournament. The South African Government appreciated the South Africa team's efforts in a post on Twitter.

=== Celebrations ===
The victory parade in Mumbai

Victory celebrations in Hyderabad

Major cities in India celebrated the win late into the night by setting off firecrackers. Indian supporters in various overseas locations also celebrated the win by hoisting Indian flags and setting off firecrackers. Later, BCCI secretary Jay Shah announced a cash reward of ₹125 crore (US$13 million) for the Indian team for their win. The Indian team's departure from Barbados was delayed by over two days due to Hurricane Beryl, which caused a shutdown of air traffic from the island. The team eventually departed for Indira Gandhi International Airport on a special Air India flight.

On 4 July 2024, the Indian team was greeted with a warm welcome by the fans as they landed in Delhi. The players and support staff met with the Indian Prime Minister Modi at his residence in 7, Race Course Road, New Delhi. They then flew to Mumbai in a Vistara flight, arrived at the airport with many people cheering once they came with the trophies, taking a 2-kilometre open bus ride from Nariman Point to the Wankhede Stadium, for which an estimated 300,000 fans gathered at the Marine Drive on Netaji Subhash Chandra Bose road. At the Wankhede Stadium, the team was felicitated by the BCCI, the players once again lifted the trophy they got, and a cheque of ₹125 crore (US$13 million) was handed over by Jay Shah and BCCI President Roger Binny.

== Broadcasting ==
The final match was broadcast live in India on Star Sports, free-to-air broadcaster DD Sports and free on OTT platform Disney+ Hotstar. In South Africa the match was broadcast live on SuperSport. The ICC named the following panel of commentators for the final: Harsha Bhogle, Ian Bishop, Carlos Brathwaite, Nasser Hussain, Dinesh Karthik, Kass Naidoo, Shaun Pollock, Ricky Ponting, Ravi Shastri, Ian Smith and Dale Steyn.

== See also ==
- International cricket in 2024
- Associate international cricket in 2024
- 2024 Women's T20 World Cup
- 2024 Women's T20 World Cup final
- 2024 Women's T20 World Cup qualification
- 2024 Women's T20 World Cup squads
- International cricket in 2024–25
- Associate international cricket in 2024–25
