= 2024 T20 World Cup =

2024 T20 World Cup can refer to the following Twenty20 International cricket tournaments:

- 2024 Men's T20 World Cup
- 2024 Women's T20 World Cup
