= 2024 ICC T20 World Cup =

The 2024 ICC T20 World Cup can refer to:

- 2024 ICC Men's T20 World Cup, the ninth edition of the ICC Men's T20 World Cup held in the United States and the West Indies in June 2024.
- 2024 ICC Women's T20 World Cup, the ninth edition of the ICC Women's T20 World Cup that was scheduled to be held in Bangladesh in September and October 2024, but was moved to the United Arab Emirates due to the political unrest in Bangladesh.
