= International cricket in 2025 =

The 2025 International cricket season took place from April 2025 to September 2025. This calendar included men's Test, men's ODI, men's T20I, women's Test, women's ODI and women's T20I matches mainly involving full member teams, as well as some other significant series. In addition to the matches shown here, a number of other T20I series involving associate nations were played during this period.

== Season overview ==
=== Men's events ===
International tours
Start date	Home team	Away team	Results [Matches]		
Start date	Home team	Away team	Test	ODI	T20I
20 April 2025	Bangladesh	Zimbabwe	1–1 [2]	—N/a	—N/a
17 May 2025	United Arab Emirates	Bangladesh	—N/a	—N/a	2–1 [3]
21 May 2025	Ireland	West Indies	—N/a	1–1 [3]	0–1 [3]
22 May 2025	England	Zimbabwe	1–0 [1]	—N/a	—N/a
28 May 2025	Pakistan	Bangladesh	—N/a	—N/a	3–0 [3]
29 May 2025	England	West Indies	—N/a	3–0 [3]	3–0 [3]
17 June 2025	Sri Lanka	Bangladesh	1–0 [2]	2–1 [3]	1–2 [3]
20 June 2025	England	India	2–2 [5]	—N/a	—N/a
25 June 2025	West Indies	Australia	0–3 [3]	—N/a	0–5 [5]
28 June 2025	Zimbabwe	South Africa	0–2 [2]	—N/a	—N/a
20 July 2025	Bangladesh	Pakistan	—N/a	—N/a	2–1 [3]
30 July 2025	Zimbabwe	New Zealand	0–2 [2]	—N/a	—N/a
31 July 2025	West Indies	Pakistan	—N/a	2–1 [3]	1–2 [3]
10 August 2025	Australia	South Africa	—N/a	1–2 [3]	2–1 [3]
29 August 2025	Zimbabwe	Sri Lanka	—N/a	0–2 [2]	1–2 [3]
30 August 2025	Bangladesh	Netherlands	—N/a	—N/a	2–0 [3]
2 September 2025	England	South Africa	—N/a	1–2 [3]	1–1 [3]
17 September 2025	Ireland	England	—N/a	—N/a	0–2 [3]
International tournaments
Start date	Tournament				Winners
4 May 2025	2025 Netherlands Tri-Nation Series (round 11)				—N/a
17 May 2025	2025 United States Tri-Nation Series (round 12)				—N/a
2 June 2025	2025 Scotland Tri-Nation Series (round 13)				—N/a
11 June 2025	(England) ICC World Test Championship Final				South Africa
14 July 2025	2025 Zimbabwe Tri-Nation Series				New Zealand
21 August 2025	2025 Cricket World Cup Challenge League A (Jersey)				—N/a
27 August 2025	2025 Canada Tri-Nation Series (round 14)				—N/a
29 August 2025	2025 United Arab Emirates T20I Tri-Nation Series				Pakistan

=== Women's events ===
International tours
Start date	Home team	Away team	Results [Matches]		
Start date	Home team	Away team	WTest	WODI	WT20I
25 April 2025	United States	Zimbabwe	—N/a	1–1 [2]	1–2 [3]
21 May 2025	England	West Indies	—N/a	3–0 [3]	3–0 [3]
11 June 2025	West Indies	South Africa	—N/a	1–2 [3]	2–1 [3]
28 June 2025	England	India	—N/a	1–2 [3]	2–3 [5]
20 July 2025	Ireland	Zimbabwe	—N/a	2–0 [2]	3–0 [3]
7 August 2025	Ireland	Pakistan	—N/a	—N/a	2–1 [3]
International tournaments
Start date	Tournament				Winners
9 April 2025	(Pakistan) 2025 Women's Cricket World Cup Qualifier				Pakistan
27 April 2025	2025 Sri Lanka Women's Tri-Nation Series				India

== April ==
=== 2025 Women's Cricket World Cup Qualifier ===
Pos	Team	Pld	W	L	NR	Pts	NRR	Qualification
1	Pakistan (H)	5	5	0	0	10	1.074	Advanced to the 2025 Women's Cricket World Cup
2	Bangladesh	5	3	2	0	6	0.639	Advanced to the 2025 Women's Cricket World Cup
3	West Indies	5	3	2	0	6	0.626	
4	Scotland	5	2	3	0	4	0.102	
5	Ireland	5	2	3	0	4	−0.037	
6	Thailand	5	0	5	0	0	−2.342	

Source: ESPNcricinfo
(H) Host

Group Stage
No.	Date	Team 1	Team 2	Venue	Result
WODI 1442	9 April	Pakistan	Ireland	Gaddafi Stadium, Lahore	Pakistan by 38 runs
WODI 1443	9 April	Scotland	West Indies	Lahore City Cricket Association Ground, Lahore	Scotland by 11 runs
WODI 1444	10 April	Bangladesh	Thailand	Lahore City Cricket Association Ground, Lahore	Bangladesh by 178 runs
WODI 1445	11 April	Pakistan	Scotland	Lahore City Cricket Association Ground, Lahore	Pakistan by 6 wickets
WODI 1446	11 April	Ireland	West Indies	Gaddafi Stadium, Lahore	West Indies by 6 runs
WODI 1447	13 April	Scotland	Thailand	Lahore City Cricket Association Ground, Lahore	Scotland by 58 runs
WODI 1448	13 April	Bangladesh	Ireland	Gaddafi Stadium, Lahore	Bangladesh by 2 wickets
WODI 1449	14 April	Pakistan	West Indies	Gaddafi Stadium, Lahore	Pakistan by 65 runs
WODI 1450	15 April	Ireland	Thailand	Lahore City Cricket Association Ground, Lahore	Ireland by 46 runs
WODI 1451	15 April	Bangladesh	Scotland	Gaddafi Stadium, Lahore	Bangladesh by 34 runs
WODI 1452	17 April	Bangladesh	West Indies	Lahore City Cricket Association Ground, Lahore	West Indies by 3 wickets
WODI 1453	17 April	Pakistan	Thailand	Gaddafi Stadium, Lahore	Pakistan by 87 runs
WODI 1454	18 April	Ireland	Scotland	Gaddafi Stadium, Lahore	Ireland by 1 wicket
WODI 1455	19 April	Pakistan	Bangladesh	Lahore City Cricket Association Ground, Lahore	Pakistan by 7 wickets
WODI 1456	19 April	Thailand	West Indies	Gaddafi Stadium, Lahore	West Indies by 6 wickets

=== Zimbabwe in Bangladesh ===
Test series
No.	Date	Venue	Result
Test 2582	20–24 April	Sylhet International Cricket Stadium, Sylhet	Zimbabwe by 3 wickets
Test 2583	28 April–2 May	Bir Shrestho Flight Lieutenant Matiur Rahman Cricket Stadium, Chittagong	Bangladesh by an innings and 106 runs

=== Zimbabwe women in the United States ===
WT20I series
No.	Date	Venue	Result
WT20I 2248	25 April	Grand Prairie Stadium, Dallas	Zimbabwe by 28 runs
WT20I 2257	27 April	Grand Prairie Stadium, Dallas	Zimbabwe by 1 run
WT20I 2262	29 April	Grand Prairie Stadium, Dallas	United States by 3 wickets
WODI series
No.	Date	Venue	Result
WODI 1459	1 May	Grand Prairie Stadium, Dallas	United States by 7 wickets
WODI 1461	3 May	Grand Prairie Stadium, Dallas	Zimbabwe by 128 runs

=== 2025 Sri Lanka Women's Tri-Nation Series ===
Pos	Team	Pld	W	L	T	NR	Pts	NRR	Qualification
1	India	4	3	1	0	0	6	0.457	Advanced to the final
2	Sri Lanka (H)	4	2	2	0	0	4	−0.542	Advanced to the final
3	South Africa	4	1	3	0	0	2	0.083	

Source: ESPNcricinfo
(H) Host

Round-robin
No.	Date	Team 1	Team 2	Venue	Result
WODI 1457	27 April	Sri Lanka	India	R. Premadasa Stadium, Colombo	India by 9 wickets
WODI 1458	29 April	India	South Africa	R. Premadasa Stadium, Colombo	India by 15 runs
WODI 1460	2 May	Sri Lanka	South Africa	R. Premadasa Stadium, Colombo	Sri Lanka by 5 wickets
WODI 1462	4 May	Sri Lanka	India	R. Premadasa Stadium, Colombo	Sri Lanka by 3 wickets
WODI 1463	7 May	India	South Africa	R. Premadasa Stadium, Colombo	India by 23 runs
WODI 1464	9 May	Sri Lanka	South Africa	R. Premadasa Stadium, Colombo	South Africa by 76 runs
Final
WODI 1465	11 May	Sri Lanka	India	R. Premadasa Stadium, Colombo	India by 97 runs

== May ==
=== 2025 Netherlands Tri-Nation Series (round 11) ===
2024–2026 Cricket World Cup League 2 – Tri-series
No.	Date	Team 1	Team 2	Venue	Result
ODI 4864	4 May	Scotland	United Arab Emirates	VRA Cricket Ground, Amstelveen	Scotland by 3 wickets
ODI 4865	6 May	Netherlands	United Arab Emirates	VRA Cricket Ground, Amstelveen	Netherlands by 113 runs
ODI 4866	8 May	Scotland	United Arab Emirates	VRA Cricket Ground, Amstelveen	United Arab Emirates by 97 runs
ODI 4867	10 May	Netherlands	Scotland	VRA Cricket Ground, Amstelveen	Netherlands by 19 runs
ODI 4868	12 May	Netherlands	United Arab Emirates	Sportpark Maarschalkerweerd, Utrecht	Netherlands by 5 wickets
ODI 4869	14 May	Scotland	United Arab Emirates	Sportpark Maarschalkerweerd, Utrecht	Scotland by 8 wickets
ODI 4870	16 May	Netherlands	Scotland	Sportpark Maarschalkerweerd, Utrecht	Scotland by 145 runs

=== 2025 United States Tri-Nation Series (round 12) ===
2024–2026 Cricket World Cup League 2 – Tri-series
No.	Date	Team 1	Team 2	Venue	Result
ODI 4871	17 May	United States	Canada	Broward County Stadium, Lauderhill	United States by 169 runs
ODI 4872	19 May	Canada	Oman	Broward County Stadium, Lauderhill	Oman by 15 runs
ODI 4874	21 May	United States	Oman	Broward County Stadium, Lauderhill	Match tied (Oman won S/O)
ODI 4876	23 May	Canada	Oman	Broward County Stadium, Lauderhill	Oman by 18 runs (DLS)
ODI 4878	25 May	United States	Canada	Broward County Stadium, Lauderhill	United States by 88 runs
ODI 4879	27 May	United States	Oman	Broward County Stadium, Lauderhill	United States by 9 runs

=== Bangladesh in the United Arab Emirates ===
T20I series
No.	Date	Venue	Result
T20I 3185	17 May	Sharjah Cricket Stadium, Sharjah	Bangladesh by 27 runs
T20I 3188	19 May	Sharjah Cricket Stadium, Sharjah	United Arab Emirates by 2 wickets
T20I 3189	21 May	Sharjah Cricket Stadium, Sharjah	United Arab Emirates by 7 wickets

=== West Indies in Ireland ===
ODI series
No.	Date	Venue	Result
ODI 4873	21 May	Castle Avenue, Clontarf	Ireland by 124 runs
ODI 4875	23 May	Castle Avenue, Clontarf	No result
ODI 4877	25 May	Castle Avenue, Clontarf	West Indies by 197 runs (DLS)
T20I series
No.	Date	Venue	Result
T20I 3222a	12 June	Bready Cricket Club Ground, Bready	Match abandoned
T20I 3233a	14 June	Bready Cricket Club Ground, Bready	Match abandoned
T20I 3238	15 June	Bready Cricket Club Ground, Bready	West Indies by 62 runs

=== West Indies women in England ===
WT20I series
No.	Date	Venue	Result
WT20I 2302	21 May	St Lawrence Ground, Canterbury	England by 8 wickets
WT20I 2303	23 May	County Ground, Hove	England by 9 wickets
WT20I 2312	26 May	County Ground, Chelmsford	England by 17 runs
WODI series
No.	Date	Venue	Result
WODI 1466	30 May	County Ground, Derby	England by 108 runs
WODI 1467	4 June	Grace Road, Leicester	England by 143 runs
WODI 1468	7 June	County Ground, Taunton	England by 9 wickets

=== Zimbabwe in England ===
Test series
No.	Date	Venue	Result
Test 2584	22–25 May	Trent Bridge, Nottingham	England by an innings and 45 runs

=== Bangladesh in Pakistan ===
T20I series
No.	Date	Venue	Result
T20I 3190	28 May	Gaddafi Stadium, Lahore	Pakistan by 37 runs
T20I 3194	30 May	Gaddafi Stadium, Lahore	Pakistan by 57 runs
T20I 3203	1 June	Gaddafi Stadium, Lahore	Pakistan by 7 wickets

=== West Indies in England ===
ODI series
No.	Date	Venue	Result
ODI 4880	29 May	Edgbaston, Birmingham	England by 238 runs
ODI 4881	1 June	Sophia Gardens, Cardiff	England by 3 wickets
ODI 4883	3 June	The Oval, London	England by 7 wickets
T20I series
No.	Date	Venue	Result
T20I 3205	6 June	Riverside Ground, Chester-le-Street	England by 21 runs
T20I 3213	8 June	County Ground, Bristol	England by 4 wickets
T20I 3218	10 June	Rose Bowl, Southampton	England by 37 runs

== June ==
=== 2025 Scotland Tri-Nation Series (round 13) ===
2024–2026 Cricket World Cup League 2 – Tri-series
No.	Date	Team 1	Team 2	Venue	Result
ODI 4882	2 June	Scotland	Nepal	Forthill, Dundee	Nepal by 1 wicket
ODI 4884	4 June	Nepal	Netherlands	Forthill, Dundee	Nepal by 5 wickets
ODI 4885	6 June	Scotland	Netherlands	Forthill, Dundee	Scotland by 44 runs
ODI 4886	8 June	Scotland	Nepal	Forthill, Dundee	Scotland by 2 runs
ODI 4887	10 June	Nepal	Netherlands	Forthill, Dundee	Nepal by 16 runs
ODI 4888	12 June	Scotland	Netherlands	Forthill, Dundee	Netherlands by 4 wickets

=== World Test Championship Final ===
Test match
No.	Date	Team 1	Team 2	Venue	Result
Test 2585	11–15 June	South Africa	Australia	Lord's, London	South Africa by 5 wickets

=== South Africa women in the West Indies ===
WODI series
No.	Date	Venue	Result
WODI 1469	11 June	Three Ws Oval, Bridgetown	West Indies by 4 wickets (DLS)
WODI 1470	14 June	Three Ws Oval, Bridgetown	South Africa by 40 runs
WODI 1471	17 June	Three Ws Oval, Bridgetown	South Africa by 166 runs (DLS)
WT20I series
No.	Date	Venue	Result
WT20I 2379	20 June	Three Ws Oval, Bridgetown	South Africa by 50 runs
WT20I 2381	22 June	Three Ws Oval, Bridgetown	West Indies by 6 wickets
WT20I 2382	23 June	Three Ws Oval, Bridgetown	West Indies by 6 wickets

=== Bangladesh in Sri Lanka ===
2025–2027 ICC World Test Championship – Test series
No.	Date	Venue	Result
Test 2586	17–21 June	Galle International Stadium, Galle	Match drawn
Test 2588	25–29 June	Sinhalese Sports Club Cricket Ground, Colombo	Sri Lanka by an innings and 78 runs
ODI series
No.	Date	Venue	Result
ODI 4889	2 July	R. Premadasa Stadium, Colombo	Sri Lanka by 77 runs
ODI 4890	5 July	R. Premadasa Stadium, Colombo	Bangladesh by 16 runs
ODI 4891	8 July	Pallekele International Cricket Stadium, Kandy	Sri Lanka by 99 runs
T20I series
No.	Date	Venue	Result
T20I 3299	10 July	Pallekele International Cricket Stadium, Kandy	Sri Lanka by 7 wickets
T20I 3315	13 July	Rangiri Dambulla International Stadium, Dambulla	Bangladesh by 83 runs
T20I 3318	16 July	R. Premadasa Stadium, Colombo	Bangladesh by 8 wickets

=== India in England ===
2025–2027 ICC World Test Championship – Test series
No.	Date	Venue	Result
Test 2587	20–24 June	Headingley, Leeds	England by 5 wickets
Test 2591	2–6 July	Edgbaston, Birmingham	India by 336 runs
Test 2594	10–14 July	Lord's, London	England by 22 runs
Test 2596	23–27 July	Old Trafford, Manchester	Match drawn
Test 2598	31 July–4 August	The Oval, London	India by 6 runs

=== Australia in the West Indies ===
2025–2027 ICC World Test Championship – Test series
No.	Date	Venue	Result
Test 2589	25–29 June	Kensington Oval, Bridgetown	Australia by 159 runs
Test 2592	3–7 July	National Cricket Stadium, St. George's	Australia by 133 runs
Test 2595	12–16 July	Sabina Park, Kingston	Australia by 176 runs
T20I series
No.	Date	Venue	Result
T20I 3339	20 July	Sabina Park, Kingston	Australia by 3 wickets
T20I 3351	22 July	Sabina Park, Kingston	Australia by 8 wickets
T20I 3369	25 July	Warner Park, Basseterre	Australia by 6 wickets
T20I 3378	26 July	Warner Park, Basseterre	Australia by 3 wickets
T20I 3385	28 July	Warner Park, Basseterre	Australia by 3 wickets

=== South Africa in Zimbabwe ===
Test series
No.	Date	Venue	Result
Test 2590	28 June–2 July	Queens Sports Club, Bulawayo	South Africa by 328 runs
Test 2593	6–10 July	Queens Sports Club, Bulawayo	South Africa by an innings and 236 runs

=== India women in England ===
WT20I series
No.	Date	Venue	Result
WT20I 2383	28 June	Trent Bridge, Nottingham	India by 97 runs
WT20I 2384	1 July	County Ground, Bristol	India by 24 runs
WT20I 2387	4 July	The Oval, London	England by 5 runs
WT20I 2398	9 July	Old Trafford, Manchester	India by 6 wickets
WT20I 2399	12 July	Edgbaston, Birmingham	England by 5 wickets
WODI series
No.	Date	Venue	Result
WODI 1472	16 July	Rose Bowl, Southampton	India by 4 wickets
WODI 1473	19 July	Lord's, London	England by 8 wickets (DLS)
WODI 1474	22 July	Riverside Ground, Chester-le-Street	India by 13 runs

== July ==
=== 2025 Zimbabwe Tri-Nation Series ===
Pos	Team	Pld	W	L	NR	Pts	NRR	Qualification
1	New Zealand	4	4	0	0	8	2.200	Advanced to the final
2	South Africa	4	2	2	0	4	0.012	Advanced to the final
3	Zimbabwe (H)	4	0	4	0	0	−2.253	

Source: ESPNcricinfo
(H) Host

T20I tri-series
No.	Date	Team 1	Team 2	Venue	Result
T20I 3316	14 July	Zimbabwe	South Africa	Harare Sports Club, Harare	South Africa by 5 wickets
T20I 3317	16 July	New Zealand	South Africa	Harare Sports Club, Harare	New Zealand by 21 runs
T20I 3324	18 July	Zimbabwe	New Zealand	Harare Sports Club, Harare	New Zealand by 8 wickets
T20I 3336	20 July	Zimbabwe	South Africa	Harare Sports Club, Harare	South Africa by 7 wickets
T20I 3347	22 July	New Zealand	South Africa	Harare Sports Club, Harare	New Zealand by 7 wickets
T20I 3360	24 July	Zimbabwe	New Zealand	Harare Sports Club, Harare	New Zealand by 60 runs
Final
T20I 3374	26 July	New Zealand	South Africa	Harare Sports Club, Harare	New Zealand by 3 runs

=== Pakistan in Bangladesh ===
T20I series
No.	Date	Venue	Result
T20I 3338	20 July	Sher-e-Bangla National Cricket Stadium, Dhaka	Bangladesh by 7 wickets
T20I 3349	22 July	Sher-e-Bangla National Cricket Stadium, Dhaka	Bangladesh by 8 runs
T20I 3361	24 July	Sher-e-Bangla National Cricket Stadium, Dhaka	Pakistan by 74 runs

=== Zimbabwe women in Ireland ===
WT20I series
No.	Date	Venue	Result
WT20I 2411	20 July	Sydney Parade, Dublin	Ireland by 6 wickets
WT20I 2416	22 July	Sydney Parade, Dublin	Ireland by 65 runs
WT20I 2421	23 July	Sydney Parade, Dublin	Ireland by 51 runs
WODI series
No.	Date	Venue	Result
WODI 1475	26 July	Stormont, Belfast	Ireland by 97 runs
WODI 1476	28 July	Stormont, Belfast	Ireland by 4 wickets

=== New Zealand in Zimbabwe ===
Test series
No.	Date	Venue	Result
Test 2597	30 July–3 August	Queens Sports Club, Bulawayo	New Zealand by 9 wickets
Test 2599	7–11 August	Queens Sports Club, Bulawayo	New Zealand by an innings and 359 runs

=== Pakistan in the West Indies ===
T20I series
No.	Date	Venue	Result
T20I 3386	31 July	Central Broward Park, Lauderhill	Pakistan by 14 runs
T20I 3388	2 August	Central Broward Park, Lauderhill	West Indies by 2 wickets
T20I 3391	3 August	Central Broward Park, Lauderhill	Pakistan by 13 runs
ODI series
No.	Date	Venue	Result
ODI 4892	8 August	Brian Lara Cricket Academy, San Fernando	Pakistan by 5 wickets
ODI 4893	10 August	Brian Lara Cricket Academy, San Fernando	West Indies by 5 wickets (DLS)
ODI 4894	12 August	Brian Lara Cricket Academy, San Fernando	West Indies by 202 runs

== August ==
=== Pakistan women in Ireland ===
WT20I series
No.	Date	Venue	Result
WT20I 2433	6 August	Castle Avenue, Clontarf	Ireland by 11 runs
WT20I 2434	8 August	Castle Avenue, Clontarf	Ireland by 4 wickets
WT20I 2435	10 August	Castle Avenue, Clontarf	Pakistan by 8 wickets

=== South Africa in Australia ===
T20I series
No.	Date	Venue	Result
T20I 3403	10 August	Marrara Oval, Darwin	Australia by 17 runs
T20I 3405	12 August	Marrara Oval, Darwin	South Africa by 53 runs
T20I 3407	16 August	Cazalys Stadium, Cairns	Australia by 2 wickets
ODI series
No.	Date	Venue	Result
ODI 4895	19 August	Cazalys Stadium, Cairns	South Africa by 98 runs
ODI 4896	22 August	Great Barrier Reef Arena, Mackay	South Africa by 84 runs
ODI 4897	24 August	Great Barrier Reef Arena, Mackay	Australia by 276 runs

=== 2025 Cricket World Cup Challenge League A (Jersey) ===
2024–2026 ICC Cricket World Cup Challenge League – List A series
No.	Date	Team 1	Team 2	Venue	Result
1st Match	21 August	Kuwait	Qatar	Grainville Cricket Ground, St Saviour	Kuwait by 22 runs
2nd Match	21 August	Jersey	Kenya	Farmers Cricket Club Ground, St Martin	Jersey by 7 wickets
3rd Match	22 August	Denmark	Papua New Guinea	Grainville Cricket Ground, St Saviour	Denmark by 18 runs
4th Match	23 August	Jersey	Kuwait	Farmers Cricket Club Ground, St Martin	Match tied
5th Match	24 August	Kenya	Qatar	Grainville Cricket Ground, St Saviour	Qatar by 8 wickets
6th Match	24 August	Kuwait	Papua New Guinea	Farmers Cricket Club Ground, St Martin	Kuwait by 4 wickets
7th Match	25 August	Jersey	Denmark	Grainville Cricket Ground, St Saviour	Jersey by 89 runs
8th Match	27 August	Denmark	Qatar	Farmers Cricket Club Ground, St Martin	No result
9th Match	27 August	Kenya	Papua New Guinea	Grainville Cricket Ground, St Saviour	No result
10th Match	28 August	Denmark	Kuwait	Grainville Cricket Ground, St Saviour	Kuwait by 7 wickets
11th Match	28 August	Jersey	Papua New Guinea	Farmers Cricket Club Ground, St Martin	Jersey by 160 runs
12th Match	30 August	Kenya	Kuwait	Grainville Cricket Ground, St Saviour	No result
13th Match	30 August	Papua New Guinea	Qatar	Farmers Cricket Club Ground, St Martin	No result
14th Match	31 August	Jersey	Qatar	Grainville Cricket Ground, St Saviour	Jersey by 8 wickets
15th Match	31 August	Denmark	Kenya	Farmers Cricket Club Ground, St Martin	Denmark by 188 runs

=== 2025 Canada Tri-Nation Series (round 14) ===
2024–2026 Cricket World Cup League 2 – Tri-series
No.	Date	Team 1	Team 2	Venue	Result
ODI 4898	27 August	Canada	Namibia	Maple Leaf North-West Ground, King City	Namibia by 5 wickets
ODI 4899a	29 August	Namibia	Scotland	Maple Leaf North-West Ground, King City	Match abandoned
ODI 4901	31 August	Canada	Scotland	Maple Leaf North-West Ground, King City	Scotland by 7 wickets
ODI 4903	2 September	Canada	Namibia	Maple Leaf North-West Ground, King City	Namibia by 24 runs
ODI 4905	4 September	Namibia	Scotland	Maple Leaf North-West Ground, King City	Scotland by 55 runs
ODI 4905a	6 September	Canada	Scotland	Maple Leaf North-West Ground, King City	Match abandoned

=== Sri Lanka in Zimbabwe ===
ODI series
No.	Date	Venue	Result
ODI 4899	29 August	Harare Sports Club, Harare	Sri Lanka by 7 runs
ODI 4900	31 August	Harare Sports Club, Harare	Sri Lanka by 5 wickets
T20I series
No.	Date	Venue	Result
T20I 3434	3 September	Harare Sports Club, Harare	Sri Lanka by 4 wickets
T20I 3439	6 September	Harare Sports Club, Harare	Zimbabwe by 5 wickets
T20I 3441	7 September	Harare Sports Club, Harare	Sri Lanka by 8 wickets

=== 2025 United Arab Emirates T20I Tri-Nation Series ===
Pos	Team	Pld	W	L	NR	Pts	NRR	Qualification
1	Pakistan	4	3	1	0	6	1.037	Advanced to the final
2	Afghanistan	4	3	1	0	6	0.262	Advanced to the final
3	United Arab Emirates (H)	4	0	4	0	0	−1.300	

Source: ESPNcricinfo
(H) Host

Round-robin
No.	Date	Team 1	Team 2	Venue	Result
T20I 3421	29 August	Afghanistan	Pakistan	Sharjah Cricket Stadium, Sharjah	Pakistan by 39 runs
T20I 3426	30 August	United Arab Emirates	Pakistan	Sharjah Cricket Stadium, Sharjah	Pakistan by 31 runs
T20I 3432	1 September	United Arab Emirates	Afghanistan	Sharjah Cricket Stadium, Sharjah	Afghanistan by 38 runs
T20I 3433	2 September	Afghanistan	Pakistan	Sharjah Cricket Stadium, Sharjah	Afghanistan by 18 runs
T20I 3436	4 September	United Arab Emirates	Pakistan	Sharjah Cricket Stadium, Sharjah	Pakistan by 31 runs
T20I 3437	5 September	United Arab Emirates	Afghanistan	Sharjah Cricket Stadium, Sharjah	Afghanistan by 4 runs
Final
T20I 3442	7 September	Afghanistan	Pakistan	Sharjah Cricket Stadium, Sharjah	Pakistan by 75 runs

=== Netherlands in Bangladesh ===
T20I series
No.	Date	Venue	Result
T20I 3425	30 August	Sylhet International Cricket Stadium, Sylhet	Bangladesh by 8 wickets
T20I 3431	1 September	Sylhet International Cricket Stadium, Sylhet	Bangladesh by 9 wickets
T20I 3435	3 September	Sylhet International Cricket Stadium, Sylhet	No result

== September ==
=== South Africa in England ===
ODI series
No.	Date	Venue	Result
ODI 4902	2 September	Headingley, Leeds	South Africa by 7 wickets
ODI 4904	4 September	Lord's, London	South Africa by 5 runs
ODI 4906	7 September	Rose Bowl, Southampton	England by 342 runs
T20I series
No.	Date	Venue	Result
T20I 3445	10 September	Sophia Gardens, Cardiff	South Africa by 14 runs (DLS)
T20I 3450	12 September	Old Trafford, Manchester	England by 146 runs
T20I 3454a	14 September	Trent Bridge, Nottingham	Match abandoned

=== England in Ireland ===
T20I series
No.	Date	Venue	Result
T20I 3461	17 September	The Village, Dublin	England by 4 wickets
T20I 3464a	19 September	The Village, Dublin	Match abandoned
T20I 3467	21 September	The Village, Dublin	England by 6 wickets

== See also ==
- Associate international cricket in 2025
- International cricket in 2024–25
- International cricket in 2025–26
