= International cricket in 2024–25 =

International cricket season

The 2024–25 International cricket season took place from late September 2024 to March 2025. This calendar included men's Test, men's ODI and men's T20I matches, women's test, women's ODI and women's T20I matches involving full member teams, as well as some other significant series.

The 2024 Women's T20 World Cup was held in October 2024 in the United Arab Emirates. The 2025 ICC Champions Trophy took place in Pakistan and the United Arab Emirates in February and March 2025. In addition to the matches shown here, a number of other T20I series involving associate nations were played during this period.

== Season overview ==
=== Men's events ===
International tours
Start date	Home team	Away team	Results [Matches]		
Start date	Home team	Away team	Test	ODI	T20I
18 September 2024	Sri Lanka	New Zealand	2–0 [2]	2–0 [3]	1–1 [2]
18 September 2024	(United Arab Emirates) Afghanistan	South Africa	—N/a	2–1 [3]	—N/a
19 September 2024	India	Bangladesh	2–0 [2]	—N/a	3–0 [3]
27 September 2024	(United Arab Emirates) Ireland	South Africa	—N/a	1–2 [3]	1–1 [2]
7 October 2024	Pakistan	England	2–1 [3]	—N/a	—N/a
13 October 2024	Sri Lanka	West Indies	—N/a	2–1 [3]	2–1 [3]
16 October 2024	India	New Zealand	0–3 [3]	—N/a	—N/a
21 October 2024	Bangladesh	South Africa	0–2 [2]	—N/a	—N/a
31 October 2024	West Indies	England	—N/a	2–1 [3]	1–3 [5]
4 November 2024	Australia	Pakistan	—N/a	1–2 [3]	3–0 [3]
6 November 2024	(United Arab Emirates) Afghanistan	Bangladesh	—N/a	2–1 [3]	—N/a
8 November 2024	South Africa	India	—N/a	—N/a	1–3 [4]
22 November 2024	Australia	India	3–1 [5]	—N/a	—N/a
22 November 2024	West Indies	Bangladesh	1–1 [2]	3–0 [3]	0–3 [3]
24 November 2024	Zimbabwe	Pakistan	—N/a	1–2 [3]	1–2 [3]
27 November 2024	South Africa	Sri Lanka	2–0 [2]	—N/a	—N/a
28 November 2024	New Zealand	England	1–2 [3]	—N/a	—N/a
10 December 2024	South Africa	Pakistan	2–0 [2]	0–3 [3]	2–0 [3]
11 December 2024	Zimbabwe	Afghanistan	0–1 [2]	0–2 [3]	1–2 [3]
28 December 2024	New Zealand	Sri Lanka	—N/a	2–1 [3]	2–1 [3]
17 January 2025	Pakistan	West Indies	1–1 [2]	—N/a	—N/a
22 January 2025	India	England	—N/a	3–0 [3]	4–1 [5]
29 January 2025	Sri Lanka	Australia	0–2 [2]	2–0 [2]	—N/a
6 February 2025	Zimbabwe	Ireland	0–1 [1]	2–1 [3]	1–0 [3]
16 March 2025	New Zealand	Pakistan	—N/a	3–0 [3]	4–1 [5]
International tournaments
Start date	Tournament				Winners
16 September 2024	2024 Namibia Tri-Nation Series (round 5)				—N/a
16 September 2024	2024 Canada Tri-Nation Series (round 6)				—N/a
25 September 2024	2024 Cricket World Cup Challenge League A (Kenya)				—N/a
25 October 2024	2024 United States Tri-Nation Series (round 7)				—N/a
1 November 2024	2024 Oman Tri-Nation Series (round 8)				—N/a
6 November 2024	2024 Cricket World Cup Challenge League B (Uganda)				—N/a
29 November 2024	(United Arab Emirates) 2024 ACC Under-19 Asia Cup				Bangladesh
6 February 2025	2025 Cricket World Cup Challenge League B (Hong Kong)				—N/a
8 February 2025	2025 Oman Tri-Nation Series (round 9)				—N/a
8 February 2025	2024–25 Pakistan Tri-Nation Series				New Zealand
19 February 2025	(Pakistan) (United Arab Emirates) 2025 ICC Champions Trophy				India
5 March 2025	2025 Namibia Tri-Nation Series (round 10)				—N/a

=== Women's events ===
International tours
Start date	Home team	Away team	Results [Matches]		
Start date	Home team	Away team	Test	ODI	T20I
16 September 2024	Pakistan	South Africa	—N/a	—N/a	1–2 [3]
19 September 2024	Australia	New Zealand	—N/a	—N/a	3–0 [3]
17 October 2024	Zimbabwe	United States	—N/a	3–2 [5]	—N/a
24 October 2024	India	New Zealand	—N/a	2–1 [3]	—N/a
24 November 2024	South Africa	England	0–1 [1]	1–2 [3]	0–3 [3]
27 November 2024	Bangladesh	Ireland	—N/a	3–0 [3]	0–3 [3]
5 December 2024	Australia	India	—N/a	3–0 [3]	—N/a
15 December 2024	India	West Indies	—N/a	3–0 [3]	2–1 [3]
19 December 2024	New Zealand	Australia	—N/a	0–2 [3]	0–3 [3]
10 January 2025	India	Ireland	—N/a	3–0 [3]	—N/a
12 January 2025	Australia	England	1–0 [1]	3–0 [3]	3–0 [3]
19 January 2025	West Indies	Bangladesh	—N/a	2–1 [3]	3–0 [3]
4 March 2025	New Zealand	Sri Lanka	—N/a	2–0 [3]	1–1 [3]
International tournaments
Start date	Tournament				Winners
3 October 2024	(United Arab Emirates) 2024 Women's T20 World Cup				New Zealand
15 December 2024	(Malaysia) 2024 ACC Under-19 Women's T20 Asia Cup				India
18 January 2025	(Malaysia) 2025 Under-19 Women's T20 World Cup				India

== September ==
=== 2024 Namibia Tri-Nation Series (round 5) ===
2024–2026 Cricket World Cup League 2 – Tri-series
No.	Date	Team 1	Team 2	Venue	Result
ODI 4761	16 September	Namibia	United States	United Ground, Windhoek	United States by 6 wickets
ODI 4763	18 September	United Arab Emirates	United States	United Ground, Windhoek	United States by 10 wickets
ODI 4767	20 September	Namibia	United Arab Emirates	United Ground, Windhoek	United Arab Emirates by 1 wicket
ODI 4771	22 September	Namibia	United States	United Ground, Windhoek	United States by 7 wickets
ODI 4774	24 September	United Arab Emirates	United States	United Ground, Windhoek	United States by 136 runs
ODI 4776	26 September	Namibia	United Arab Emirates	United Ground, Windhoek	Namibia by 8 wickets

=== South Africa women in Pakistan ===
WT20I series
No.	Date	Venue	Result
WT20I 2028	16 September	Multan Cricket Stadium, Multan	South Africa by 10 runs
WT20I 2029	18 September	Multan Cricket Stadium, Multan	Pakistan by 13 runs
WT20I 2031	20 September	Multan Cricket Stadium, Multan	South Africa by 8 wickets

=== 2024 Canada Tri-Nation Series (round 6) ===
2024–2026 Cricket World Cup League 2 – Tri-series
No.	Date	Team 1	Team 2	Venue	Result
ODI 4762	16 September	Canada	Nepal	Maple Leaf Cricket Club, King City	Canada by 103 runs
ODI 4765	18 September	Nepal	Oman	Maple Leaf Cricket Club, King City	Oman by 1 wicket
ODI 4769	20 September	Canada	Oman	Maple Leaf Cricket Club, King City	Canada by 59 runs
ODI 4773	22 September	Canada	Nepal	Maple Leaf Cricket Club, King City	Canada by 5 wickets
ODI 4775a	24 September	Nepal	Oman	Maple Leaf Cricket Club, King City	Match abandoned
ODI 4777	26 September	Canada	Oman	Maple Leaf Cricket Club, King City	Canada by 5 wickets

=== New Zealand in Sri Lanka ===
2023–2025 ICC World Test Championship – Test series
No.	Date	Venue	Result
Test 2549	18–23 September	Galle International Stadium, Galle	Sri Lanka by 63 runs
Test 2551	26–30 September	Galle International Stadium, Galle	Sri Lanka by an innings and 154 runs
T20I series
No.	Date	Venue	Result
T20I 2939	9 November	Rangiri Dambulla International Stadium, Dambulla	Sri Lanka by 4 wickets
T20I 2941	10 November	Rangiri Dambulla International Stadium, Dambulla	New Zealand by 5 runs
ODI series
No.	Date	Venue	Result
ODI 4807	13 November	Rangiri Dambulla International Stadium, Dambulla	Sri Lanka by 45 runs (DLS)
ODI 4808	17 November	Pallekele International Cricket Stadium, Kandy	Sri Lanka by 3 wickets (DLS)
ODI 4809	19 November	Pallekele International Cricket Stadium, Kandy	No result

=== South Africa against Afghanistan in the UAE ===
ODI series
No.	Date	Venue	Result
ODI 4764	18 September	Sharjah Cricket Stadium, Sharjah	Afghanistan by 6 wickets
ODI 4768	20 September	Sharjah Cricket Stadium, Sharjah	Afghanistan by 177 runs
ODI 4772	22 September	Sharjah Cricket Stadium, Sharjah	South Africa by 7 wickets

=== Bangladesh in India ===
2023–2025 ICC World Test Championship – Test series
No.	Date	Venue	Result
Test 2550	19–23 September	M. A. Chidambaram Stadium, Chennai	India by 280 runs
Test 2552	27 September–1 October	Green Park Stadium, Kanpur	India by 7 wickets
T20I series
No.	Date	Venue	Result
T20I 2897	6 October	Shrimant Madhavrao Scindia Cricket Stadium, Gwalior	India by 7 wickets
T20I 2899	9 October	Arun Jaitley Cricket Stadium, Delhi	India by 86 runs
T20I 2904	12 October	Rajiv Gandhi International Cricket Stadium, Hyderabad	India by 133 runs

=== New Zealand women in Australia ===
WT20I series
No.	Date	Venue	Result
WT20I 2030	19 September	Great Barrier Reef Arena, Mackay	Australia by 5 wickets
WT20I 2036	22 September	Great Barrier Reef Arena, Mackay	Australia by 29 runs
WT20I 2038	24 September	Allan Border Field, Brisbane	Australia by 5 wickets

=== 2024 Cricket World Cup Challenge League A (Kenya) ===
2024–2026 ICC Cricket World Cup Challenge League – List A series
No.	Date	Team 1	Team 2	Venue	Result
1st Match	25 September	Denmark	Kuwait	Gymkhana Club Ground, Nairobi	Kuwait by 2 wickets
2nd Match	25 September	Jersey	Kenya	Ruaraka Sports Club Ground, Nairobi	Kenya by 6 wickets
3rd Match	26 September	Jersey	Qatar	Gymkhana Club Ground, Nairobi	Jersey by 168 runs
4th Match	26 September	Denmark	Papua New Guinea	Ruaraka Sports Club Ground, Nairobi	Papua New Guinea by 6 wickets
5th Match	28 September	Jersey	Papua New Guinea	Gymkhana Club Ground, Nairobi	Jersey by 7 wickets
6th Match	28 September	Kuwait	Qatar	Ruaraka Sports Club Ground, Nairobi	Kuwait by 47 runs (DLS)
7th Match	29 September	Denmark	Kenya	Gymkhana Club Ground, Nairobi	Denmark by 4 wickets
8th Match	1 October	Jersey	Kuwait	Gymkhana Club Ground, Nairobi	Jersey by 123 runs
9th Match	1 October	Papua New Guinea	Qatar	Ruaraka Sports Club Ground, Nairobi	Papua New Guinea by 7 wickets
10th Match	2 October	Denmark	Qatar	Gymkhana Club Ground, Nairobi	Denmark by 3 wickets
11th Match	2 October	Kenya	Kuwait	Ruaraka Sports Club Ground, Nairobi	Kuwait by 97 runs
12th Match	4 October	Kenya	Qatar	Gymkhana Club Ground, Nairobi	Kenya by 3 wickets
13th Match	4 October	Kuwait	Papua New Guinea	Ruaraka Sports Club Ground, Nairobi	Papua New Guinea by 8 wickets
14th Match	5 October	Kenya	Papua New Guinea	Gymkhana Club Ground, Nairobi	Papua New Guinea by 1 wicket
15th Match	5 October	Denmark	Jersey	Ruaraka Sports Club Ground, Nairobi	Jersey by 52 runs

=== South Africa against Ireland in the UAE ===
T20I series
No.	Date	Venue	Result
T20I 2869	27 September	Sheikh Zayed Cricket Stadium, Abu Dhabi	South Africa by 8 wickets
T20I 2876	29 September	Sheikh Zayed Cricket Stadium, Abu Dhabi	Ireland by 10 runs
ODI series
No.	Date	Venue	Result
ODI 4780	2 October	Sheikh Zayed Cricket Stadium, Abu Dhabi	South Africa by 139 runs
ODI 4781	4 October	Sheikh Zayed Cricket Stadium, Abu Dhabi	South Africa by 174 runs
ODI 4782	7 October	Sheikh Zayed Cricket Stadium, Abu Dhabi	Ireland by 69 runs

== October ==
=== 2024 Women's T20 World Cup ===
Pos	Team	Pld	W	L	NR	Pts	NRR	Qualification
1	Australia	4	4	0	0	8	2.223	Advanced to knockout stage
2	New Zealand	4	3	1	0	6	0.879	Advanced to knockout stage
3	India	4	2	2	0	4	0.322	Eliminated
4	Pakistan	4	1	3	0	2	−1.040	Eliminated
5	Sri Lanka	4	0	4	0	0	−2.173	Eliminated

Source: ESPNcricinfo
Rules for classification: 1) Points; 2) Wins; 3) Net run rate; 4) Results of games between tied teams

Pos	Team	Pld	W	L	NR	Pts	NRR	Qualification
1	West Indies	4	3	1	0	6	1.504	Advanced to knockout stage
2	South Africa	4	3	1	0	6	1.382	Advanced to knockout stage
3	England	4	3	1	0	6	1.117	Eliminated
4	Bangladesh	4	1	3	0	2	−0.844	Eliminated
5	Scotland	4	0	4	0	0	−3.129	Eliminated

Source: ESPNcricinfo
Rules for classification: 1) Points; 2) Wins; 3) Net run rate; 4) Results of games between tied teams

Group stage
No.	Date	Team 1	Team 2	Venue	Result
WT20I 2057	3 October	Bangladesh	Scotland	Sharjah Cricket Stadium, Sharjah	Bangladesh by 16 runs
WT20I 2058	3 October	Pakistan	Sri Lanka	Sharjah Cricket Stadium, Sharjah	Pakistan by 31 runs
WT20I 2060	4 October	South Africa	West Indies	Dubai International Cricket Stadium, Dubai	South Africa by 10 wickets
WT20I 2061	4 October	India	New Zealand	Dubai International Cricket Stadium, Dubai	New Zealand by 58 runs
WT20I 2064	5 October	Australia	Sri Lanka	Sharjah Cricket Stadium, Sharjah	Australia by 6 wickets
WT20I 2063	5 October	Bangladesh	England	Sharjah Cricket Stadium, Sharjah	England by 21 runs
WT20I 2066	6 October	Pakistan	India	Dubai International Cricket Stadium, Dubai	India by 6 wickets
WT20I 2067	6 October	Scotland	West Indies	Dubai International Cricket Stadium, Dubai	West Indies by 6 wickets
WT20I 2068	7 October	England	South Africa	Sharjah Cricket Stadium, Sharjah	England by 7 wickets
WT20I 2071	8 October	Australia	New Zealand	Sharjah Cricket Stadium, Sharjah	Australia by 60 runs
WT20I 2074	9 October	Scotland	South Africa	Dubai International Cricket Stadium, Dubai	South Africa by 80 runs
WT20I 2075	9 October	India	Sri Lanka	Dubai International Cricket Stadium, Dubai	India by 82 runs
WT20I 2078	10 October	Bangladesh	West Indies	Sharjah Cricket Stadium, Sharjah	West Indies by 8 wickets
WT20I 2081	11 October	Pakistan	Australia	Dubai International Cricket Stadium, Dubai	Australia by 9 wickets
WT20I 2085	12 October	New Zealand	Sri Lanka	Sharjah Cricket Stadium, Sharjah	New Zealand by 8 wickets
WT20I 2087	12 October	Bangladesh	South Africa	Dubai International Cricket Stadium, Dubai	South Africa by 7 wickets
WT20I 2091	13 October	England	Scotland	Sharjah Cricket Stadium, Sharjah	England by 10 wickets
WT20I 2093	13 October	Australia	India	Sharjah Cricket Stadium, Sharjah	Australia by 9 runs
WT20I 2094	14 October	Pakistan	New Zealand	Dubai International Cricket Stadium, Dubai	New Zealand by 54 runs
WT20I 2095	15 October	England	West Indies	Dubai International Cricket Stadium, Dubai	West Indies by 6 wickets
Semi-finals
No.	Date	Team 1	Team 2	Venue	Result
WT20I 2096	17 October	Australia	South Africa	Dubai International Cricket Stadium, Dubai	South Africa by 8 wickets
WT20I 2097	18 October	New Zealand	West Indies	Sharjah Cricket Stadium, Sharjah	New Zealand by 8 runs
Final
No.	Date	Team 1	Team 2	Venue	Result
WT20I 2098	20 October	New Zealand	South Africa	Dubai International Cricket Stadium, Dubai	New Zealand by 32 runs

=== England in Pakistan ===
2023–2025 ICC World Test Championship – Test series
No.	Date	Venue	Result
Test 2553	7–11 October	Multan Cricket Stadium, Multan	England by an innings and 47 runs
Test 2554	15–19 October	Multan Cricket Stadium, Multan	Pakistan by 152 runs
Test 2558	24–28 October	Rawalpindi Cricket Stadium, Rawalpindi	Pakistan by 9 wickets

=== West Indies in Sri Lanka ===
T20I series
No.	Date	Venue	Result
T20I 2907	13 October	Rangiri Dambulla International Stadium, Dambulla	West Indies by 5 wickets
T20I 2908	15 October	Rangiri Dambulla International Stadium, Dambulla	Sri Lanka by 73 runs
T20I 2909	17 October	Rangiri Dambulla International Stadium, Dambulla	Sri Lanka by 9 wickets
ODI series
No.	Date	Venue	Result
ODI 4783	20 October	Pallekele International Cricket Stadium, Kandy	Sri Lanka by 5 wickets (DLS)
ODI 4784	23 October	Pallekele International Cricket Stadium, Kandy	Sri Lanka by 5 wickets
ODI 4786	26 October	Pallekele International Cricket Stadium, Kandy	West Indies by 8 wickets (DLS)

=== New Zealand in India ===
2023–2025 ICC World Test Championship – Test series
No.	Date	Venue	Result
Test 2555	16–20 October	M. Chinnaswamy Stadium, Bangalore	New Zealand by 8 wickets
Test 2557	24–28 October	Maharashtra Cricket Association Stadium, Pune	New Zealand by 113 runs
Test 2560	1–5 November	Wankhede Stadium, Mumbai	New Zealand by 25 runs

=== United States women in Zimbabwe ===
WODI series
No.	Date	Venue	Result
WODI 1408	17 October	Harare Sports Club, Harare	Zimbabwe by 5 wickets
WODI 1409	20 October	Harare Sports Club, Harare	Zimbabwe by 6 wickets
WODI 1410	23 October	Harare Sports Club, Harare	United States by 4 wickets
WODI 1412	26 October	Harare Sports Club, Harare	Zimbabwe by 18 runs (DLS)
WODI 1414	28 October	Harare Sports Club, Harare	United States by 7 wickets

=== South Africa in Bangladesh ===
2023–2025 ICC World Test Championship – Test series
No.	Date	Venue	Result
Test 2556	21–25 October	Sher-e-Bangla National Cricket Stadium, Dhaka	South Africa by 7 wickets
Test 2559	29 October–2 November	Zohur Ahmed Chowdhury Stadium, Chittagong	South Africa by an innings and 273 runs

=== New Zealand women in India ===
2022–2025 ICC Women's Championship — WODI series
No.	Date	Venue	Result
WODI 1411	24 October	Narendra Modi Stadium, Ahmedabad	India by 59 runs
WODI 1413	27 October	Narendra Modi Stadium, Ahmedabad	New Zealand by 76 runs
WODI 1415	29 October	Narendra Modi Stadium, Ahmedabad	India by 6 wickets

=== 2024 United States Tri-Nation Series (round 7) ===
2024–2026 Cricket World Cup League 2 – Tri-series
No.	Date	Team 1	Team 2	Venue	Result
ODI 4785	25 October	United States	Scotland	Grand Prairie Stadium, Dallas	Scotland by 10 wickets
ODI 4787	27 October	United States	Nepal	Grand Prairie Stadium, Dallas	United States by 3 wickets
ODI 4788	29 October	Nepal	Scotland	Grand Prairie Stadium, Dallas	Nepal by 5 wickets
ODI 4789	31 October	United States	Scotland	Grand Prairie Stadium, Dallas	Scotland by 71 runs
ODI 4793	2 November	United States	Nepal	Grand Prairie Stadium, Dallas	United States by 37 runs
ODI 4796	4 November	Nepal	Scotland	Grand Prairie Stadium, Dallas	No result

=== England in the West Indies ===
ODI series
No.	Date	Venue	Result
ODI 4790	31 October	Sir Vivian Richards Stadium, North Sound	West Indies by 8 wickets (DLS)
ODI 4792	2 November	Sir Vivian Richards Stadium, North Sound	England by 5 wickets
ODI 4799	6 November	Kensington Oval, Bridgetown	West Indies by 8 wickets
T20I series
No.	Date	Venue	Result
T20I 2940	9 November	Kensington Oval, Bridgetown	England by 8 wickets
T20I 2943	10 November	Kensington Oval, Bridgetown	England by 7 wickets
T20I 2950	14 November	Daren Sammy Cricket Ground, Gros Islet	England by 3 wickets
T20I 2956	16 November	Daren Sammy Cricket Ground, Gros Islet	West Indies by 5 wickets
T20I 2958	17 November	Daren Sammy Cricket Ground, Gros Islet	No result

== November ==
=== 2024 Oman Tri-Nation Series (round 8) ===
2024–2026 Cricket World Cup League 2 – Tri-series
No.	Date	Team 1	Team 2	Venue	Result
ODI 4791	1 November	Oman	United Arab Emirates	Oman Cricket Academy Ground Turf 1, Al Amarat	Oman by 6 wickets
ODI 4794	3 November	Netherlands	United Arab Emirates	Oman Cricket Academy Ground Turf 1, Al Amarat	United Arab Emirates by 26 runs
ODI 4797	5 November	Oman	Netherlands	Oman Cricket Academy Ground Turf 1, Al Amarat	Oman by 8 wickets
ODI 4800	7 November	Oman	United Arab Emirates	Oman Cricket Academy Ground Turf 1, Al Amarat	Oman by 4 wickets
ODI 4802	9 November	Netherlands	United Arab Emirates	Oman Cricket Academy Ground Turf 1, Al Amarat	Netherlands by 67 runs
ODI 4805	11 November	Oman	Netherlands	Oman Cricket Academy Ground Turf 1, Al Amarat	Oman by 1 run

=== Pakistan in Australia ===
ODI series
No.	Date	Venue	Result
ODI 4795	4 November	Melbourne Cricket Ground, Melbourne	Australia by 2 wickets
ODI 4801	8 November	Adelaide Oval, Adelaide	Pakistan by 9 wickets
ODI 4804	10 November	Perth Stadium, Perth	Pakistan by 8 wickets
T20I series
No.	Date	Venue	Result
T20I 2948	14 November	The Gabba, Brisbane	Australia by 29 runs
T20I 2954	16 November	Sydney Cricket Ground, Sydney	Australia by 13 runs
T20I 2959	18 November	Bellerive Oval, Hobart	Australia by 7 wickets

=== 2024 Cricket World Cup Challenge League B (Uganda) ===
2024–2026 Cricket World Cup Challenge League – List A series
No.	Date	Team 1	Team 2	Venue	Result
1st Match	6 November	Uganda	Singapore	Entebbe Cricket Oval, Entebbe	Uganda by 7 wickets
2nd Match	7 November	Bahrain	Hong Kong	Lugogo Stadium, Kampala	Hong Kong by 3 wickets (DLS)
3rd Match	7 November	Italy	Tanzania	Entebbe Cricket Oval, Entebbe	Italy by 9 wickets (DLS)
4th Match	9 November	Uganda	Tanzania	Lugogo Stadium, Kampala	Uganda by 209 runs
5th Match	9 November	Hong Kong	Italy	Entebbe Cricket Oval, Entebbe	Italy by 155 runs
6th Match	10 November	Uganda	Hong Kong	Lugogo Stadium, Kampala	No result
7th Match	10 November	Bahrain	Singapore	Entebbe Cricket Oval, Entebbe	Bahrain by 2 wickets
8th Match	12 November	Bahrain	Italy	Lugogo Stadium, Kampala	Match abandoned
9th Match	12 November	Hong Kong	Tanzania	Entebbe Cricket Oval, Entebbe	Hong Kong by 5 wickets
10th Match	13 November	Singapore	Tanzania	Lugogo Stadium, Kampala	No result
11th Match	13 November	Uganda	Italy	Entebbe Cricket Oval, Entebbe	Uganda by 24 runs
12th Match	15 November	Bahrain	Tanzania	Lugogo Stadium, Kampala	Bahrain by 84 runs
13th Match	15 November	Hong Kong	Singapore	Entebbe Cricket Oval, Entebbe	Hong Kong by 57 runs (DLS)
14th Match	16 November	Italy	Singapore	Lugogo Stadium, Kampala	Italy by 8 wickets
15th Match	16 November	Bahrain	Uganda	Entebbe Cricket Oval, Entebbe	Uganda by 166 runs

=== Bangladesh against Afghanistan in the UAE ===
ODI series
No.	Date	Venue	Result
ODI 4798	6 November	Sharjah Cricket Stadium, Sharjah	Afghanistan by 92 runs
ODI 4803	9 November	Sharjah Cricket Stadium, Sharjah	Bangladesh by 68 runs
ODI 4806	11 November	Sharjah Cricket Stadium, Sharjah	Afghanistan by 5 wickets

=== India in South Africa ===
T20I series
No.	Date	Venue	Result
T20I 2938	8 November	Kingsmead, Durban	India by 61 runs
T20I 2942	10 November	St George's Park, Gqeberha	South Africa by 3 wickets
T20I 2947	13 November	Centurion Park, Centurion	India by 11 runs
T20I 2952	15 November	Wanderers Stadium, Johannesburg	India by 135 runs

=== India in Australia ===
2023–2025 ICC World Test Championship – Test series
No.	Date	Venue	Result
Test 2561	22–26 November	Perth Stadium, Perth	India by 295 runs
Test 2568	6–10 December	Adelaide Oval, Adelaide	Australia by 10 wickets
Test 2570	14–18 December	The Gabba, Brisbane	Match drawn
Test 2571	26–30 December	Melbourne Cricket Ground, Melbourne	Australia by 184 runs
Test 2575	3–7 January	Sydney Cricket Ground, Sydney	Australia by 6 wickets

=== Bangladesh in the West Indies ===
2023–2025 ICC World Test Championship – Test series
No.	Date	Venue	Result
Test 2562	22–26 November	Sir Vivian Richards Stadium, North Sound	West Indies by 201 runs
Test 2565	30 November–4 December	Sabina Park, Kingston	Bangladesh by 101 runs
ODI series
No.	Date	Venue	Result
ODI 4813	8 December	Warner Park Sporting Complex, Basseterre	West Indies by 5 wickets
ODI 4814	10 December	Warner Park Sporting Complex, Basseterre	West Indies by 7 wickets
ODI 4815	12 December	Warner Park Sporting Complex, Basseterre	West Indies by 4 wickets
T20I series
No.	Date	Venue	Result
T20I 3063	15 December	Arnos Vale Stadium, Kingstown	Bangladesh by 7 runs
T20I 3071	17 December	Arnos Vale Stadium, Kingstown	Bangladesh by 27 runs
T20I 3075	19 December	Arnos Vale Stadium, Kingstown	Bangladesh by 80 runs

=== Pakistan in Zimbabwe ===
ODI series
No.	Date	Venue	Result
ODI 4810	24 November	Queens Sports Club, Bulawayo	Zimbabwe by 80 runs (DLS)
ODI 4811	26 November	Queens Sports Club, Bulawayo	Pakistan by 10 wickets
ODI 4812	28 November	Queens Sports Club, Bulawayo	Pakistan by 99 runs
T20I series
No.	Date	Venue	Result
T20I 2997	1 December	Queens Sports Club, Bulawayo	Pakistan by 57 runs
T20I 2999	3 December	Queens Sports Club, Bulawayo	Pakistan by 10 wickets
T20I 3004	5 December	Queens Sports Club, Bulawayo	Zimbabwe by 2 wickets

=== England women in South Africa ===
WT20I series
No.	Date	Venue	Result
WT20I 2133	24 November	Buffalo Park, East London	England by 4 wickets
WT20I 2134	27 November	Willowmoore Park, Benoni	England by 36 runs
WT20I 2135	30 November	Centurion Park, Centurion	England by 9 wickets
2022–2025 ICC Women's Championship – WODI series
No.	Date	Venue	Result
WODI 1419	4 December	De Beers Diamond Oval, Kimberley	South Africa by 6 wickets
WODI 1422	8 December	Kingsmead, Durban	England by 6 wickets
WODI 1424	11 December	JB Marks Oval, Potchefstroom	England by 6 wickets (DLS)
Only WTest
No.	Date	Venue	Result
WTest 150	15–18 December	Mangaung Oval, Bloemfontein	England by 286 runs

=== Ireland women in Bangladesh ===
2022–2025 ICC Women's Championship — WODI series
No.	Date	Venue	Result
WODI 1416	27 November	Sher-e-Bangla National Cricket Stadium, Dhaka	Bangladesh by 154 runs
WODI 1417	30 November	Sher-e-Bangla National Cricket Stadium, Dhaka	Bangladesh by 5 wickets
WODI 1418	2 December	Sher-e-Bangla National Cricket Stadium, Dhaka	Bangladesh by 7 wickets
WT20I series
No.	Date	Venue	Result
WT20I 2142	5 December	Sylhet International Cricket Stadium, Sylhet	Ireland by 12 runs
WT20I 2146	7 December	Sylhet International Cricket Stadium, Sylhet	Ireland by 47 runs
WT20I 2151	9 December	Sylhet International Cricket Stadium, Sylhet	Ireland by 4 wickets

=== Sri Lanka in South Africa ===
2023–2025 ICC World Test Championship – Test series
No.	Date	Venue	Result
Test 2563	27 November–1 December	Kingsmead, Durban	South Africa by 233 runs
Test 2566	5–9 December	St George's Park, Gqeberha	South Africa by 109 runs

=== England in New Zealand ===
2023–2025 ICC World Test Championship – Test series
No.	Date	Venue	Result
Test 2564	28 November–2 December	Hagley Oval, Christchurch	England by 8 wickets
Test 2567	6–10 December	Basin Reserve, Wellington	England by 323 runs
Test 2569	14–18 December	Seddon Park, Hamilton	New Zealand by 423 runs

== December ==
=== India women in Australia ===
2022–2025 ICC Women's Championship — WODI series
No.	Date	Venue	Result
WODI 1420	5 December	Allan Border Field, Brisbane	Australia by 5 wickets
WODI 1421	8 December	Allan Border Field, Brisbane	Australia by 122 runs
WODI 1423	11 December	WACA Ground, Perth	Australia by 83 runs

=== Pakistan in South Africa ===
T20I series
No.	Date	Venue	Result
T20I 3026	10 December	Kingsmead, Durban	South Africa by 11 runs
T20I 3047	13 December	Centurion Park, Centurion	South Africa by 7 wickets
T20I 3053a	14 December	Wanderers Stadium, Johannesburg	Match abandoned
ODI series
No.	Date	Venue	Result
ODI 4817	17 December	Boland Park, Paarl	Pakistan by 3 wickets
ODI 4819	19 December	Newlands Cricket Ground, Cape Town	Pakistan by 81 runs
ODI 4821	22 December	Wanderers Stadium, Johannesburg	Pakistan by 36 runs (DLS)
2023–2025 ICC World Test Championship – Test series
No.	Date	Venue	Result
Test 2572	26–30 December	Centurion Park, Centurion	South Africa by 2 wickets
Test 2576	3–7 January	Newlands Cricket Ground, Cape Town	South Africa by 10 wickets

=== Afghanistan in Zimbabwe ===
T20I series
No.	Date	Venue	Result
T20I 3031	11 December	Harare Sports Club, Harare	Zimbabwe by 4 wickets
T20I 3046	13 December	Harare Sports Club, Harare	Afghanistan by 50 runs
T20I 3051	14 December	Harare Sports Club, Harare	Afghanistan by 3 wickets
ODI series
No.	Date	Venue	Result
ODI 4816	17 December	Harare Sports Club, Harare	No result
ODI 4818	19 December	Harare Sports Club, Harare	Afghanistan by 232 runs
ODI 4820	21 December	Harare Sports Club, Harare	Afghanistan by 8 wickets
Test series
No.	Date	Venue	Result
Test 2573	26–30 December	Queens Sports Club, Bulawayo	Match drawn
Test 2574	2–6 January	Queens Sports Club, Bulawayo	Afghanistan by 72 runs

=== West Indies women in India ===
WT20I series
No.	Date	Venue	Result
WT20I 2156	15 December	DY Patil Stadium, Navi Mumbai	India by 49 runs
WT20I 2158	17 December	DY Patil Stadium, Navi Mumbai	West Indies by 9 wickets
WT20I 2159	19 December	DY Patil Stadium, Navi Mumbai	India by 60 runs
2022–2025 ICC Women's Championship — WODI series
No.	Date	Venue	Result
WODI 1426	22 December	Baroda Cricket Association Stadium, Vadodara	India by 211 runs
WODI 1428	24 December	Baroda Cricket Association Stadium, Vadodara	India by 115 runs
WODI 1429	27 December	Baroda Cricket Association Stadium, Vadodara	India by 5 wickets

=== Australia women in New Zealand ===
2022–2025 ICC Women's Championship — WODI series
No.	Date	Venue	Result
WODI 1424a	19 December	Basin Reserve, Wellington	Match abandoned
WODI 1425	21 December	Basin Reserve, Wellington	Australia by 65 runs (DLS)
WODI 1427	23 December	Basin Reserve, Wellington	Australia by 75 runs
WT20I series
No.	Date	Venue	Result
WT20I 2220	21 March	Eden Park, Auckland	Australia by 8 wickets
WT20I 2221	23 March	Bay Oval, Mount Maunganui	Australia by 82 runs
WT20I 2222	26 March	Wellington Regional Stadium, Wellington	Australia by 8 runs

=== Sri Lanka in New Zealand ===
T20I series
No.	Date	Venue	Result
T20I 3079	28 December	Bay Oval, Mount Maunganui	New Zealand by 8 runs
T20I 3080	30 December	Bay Oval, Mount Maunganui	New Zealand by 45 runs
T20I 3081	2 January	Saxton Oval, Nelson	Sri Lanka by 7 runs
ODI series
No.	Date	Venue	Result
ODI 4822	5 January	Basin Reserve, Wellington	New Zealand by 9 wickets
ODI 4823	8 January	Seddon Park, Hamilton	New Zealand by 113 runs
ODI 4824	11 January	Eden Park, Auckland	Sri Lanka by 140 runs

== January ==
=== Ireland women in India ===
2022–2025 ICC Women's Championship — WODI series
No.	Date	Venue	Result
WODI 1430	10 January	Niranjan Shah Stadium, Rajkot	India by 6 wickets
WODI 1432	12 January	Niranjan Shah Stadium, Rajkot	India by 116 runs
WODI 1434	15 January	Niranjan Shah Stadium, Rajkot	India by 304 runs

=== England women in Australia ===
WODI series
No.	Date	Venue	Result
WODI 1431	12 January	North Sydney Oval, North Sydney	Australia by 4 wickets
WODI 1433	14 January	Junction Oval, Melbourne	Australia by 21 runs
WODI 1435	17 January	Bellerive Oval, Hobart	Australia by 86 runs
WT20I series
No.	Date	Venue	Result
WT20I 2169	20 January	Sydney Cricket Ground, Sydney	Australia by 57 runs
WT20I 2170	23 January	Manuka Oval, Canberra	Australia by 6 runs (DLS)
WT20I 2171	25 January	Adelaide Oval, Adelaide	Australia by 72 runs
Only WTest
No.	Date	Venue	Result
WTest 151	30 January–2 February	Melbourne Cricket Ground, Melbourne	Australia by an innings and 122 runs

=== West Indies in Pakistan ===
2023–2025 ICC World Test Championship – Test series
No.	Date	Venue	Result
Test 2577	17–21 January	Multan Cricket Stadium, Multan	Pakistan by 127 runs
Test 2578	25–29 January	Multan Cricket Stadium, Multan	West Indies by 120 runs

=== Bangladesh women in the West Indies ===
2022–2025 ICC Women's Championship — WODI series
No.	Date	Venue	Result
WODI 1436	19 January	Warner Park, Basseterre	West Indies by 9 wickets
WODI 1437	21 January	Warner Park, Basseterre	Bangladesh by 60 runs
WODI 1438	24 January	Warner Park, Basseterre	West Indies by 8 wickets
WT20I series
No.	Date	Venue	Result
WT20I 2172	27 January	Warner Park, Basseterre	West Indies by 8 wickets
WT20I 2173	29 January	Warner Park, Basseterre	West Indies by 106 runs
WT20I 2176	31 January	Warner Park, Basseterre	West Indies by 5 wickets

=== England in India ===
T20I series
No.	Date	Venue	Result
T20I 3082	22 January	Eden Gardens, Kolkata	India by 7 wickets
T20I 3083	25 January	M. A. Chidambaram Stadium, Chennai	India by 2 wickets
T20I 3084	28 January	Niranjan Shah Stadium, Rajkot	England by 26 runs
T20I 3085	31 January	Maharashtra Cricket Association Stadium, Pune	India by 15 runs
T20I 3086	2 February	Wankhede Stadium, Mumbai	India by 150 runs
ODI series
No.	Date	Venue	Result
ODI 4825	6 February	Vidarbha Cricket Association Stadium, Nagpur	India by 4 wickets
ODI 4828	9 February	Barabati Stadium, Cuttack	India by 4 wickets
ODI 4833	12 February	Narendra Modi Stadium, Ahmedabad	India by 142 runs

=== Australia in Sri Lanka ===
2023–2025 ICC World Test Championship – Test series
No.	Date	Venue	Result
Test 2579	29 January–2 February	Galle International Stadium, Galle	Australia by an innings and 242 runs
Test 2580	6–10 February	Galle International Stadium, Galle	Australia by 9 wickets
ODI series
No.	Date	Venue	Result
ODI 4831	12 February	R. Premadasa Stadium, Colombo	Sri Lanka by 49 runs
ODI 4835	14 February	R. Premadasa Stadium, Colombo	Sri Lanka by 174 runs

== February ==
=== 2025 Cricket World Cup Challenge League B (Hong Kong) ===
2024–2026 Cricket World Cup Challenge League – List A series
No.	Date	Team 1	Team 2	Venue	Result
1st Match	6 February	Hong Kong	Singapore	Mission Road Ground, Mong Kok	Hong Kong by 7 wickets
2nd Match	7 February	Bahrain	Uganda	Mission Road Ground, Mong Kok	Uganda by 52 runs
3rd Match	7 February	Italy	Tanzania	Kowloon Cricket Club, Kowloon	Italy by 8 wickets
4th Match	9 February	Italy	Singapore	Mission Road Ground, Mong Kok	Italy by 6 wickets
5th Match	9 February	Hong Kong	Bahrain	Kowloon Cricket Club, Kowloon	Hong Kong by 9 wickets
6th Match	10 February	Bahrain	Tanzania	Mission Road Ground, Mong Kok	Bahrain by 6 wickets
7th Match	10 February	Singapore	Uganda	Kowloon Cricket Club, Kowloon	Uganda by 8 wickets
8th Match	12 February	Hong Kong	Tanzania	Mission Road Ground, Mong Kok	Match abandoned
9th Match	12 February	Italy	Uganda	Kowloon Cricket Club, Kowloon	Match abandoned
10th Match	13 February	Bahrain	Singapore	Mission Road Ground, Mong Kok	Bahrain by 8 wickets
11th Match	13 February	Hong Kong	Uganda	Kowloon Cricket Club, Kowloon	Uganda by 76 runs
12th Match	15 February	Tanzania	Uganda	Mission Road Ground, Mong Kok	Uganda by 59 runs
13th Match	15 February	Bahrain	Italy	Kowloon Cricket Club, Kowloon	Italy by 6 wickets
14th Match	16 February	Hong Kong	Italy	Mission Road Ground, Mong Kok	Italy by 7 wickets
15th Match	16 February	Singapore	Tanzania	Kowloon Cricket Club, Kowloon	Tanzania by 91 runs

=== Ireland in Zimbabwe ===
Only Test
No.	Date	Venue	Result
Test 2581	6–10 February	Queens Sports Club, Bulawayo	Ireland by 63 runs
ODI series
No.	Date	Venue	Result
ODI 4837	14 February	Harare Sports Club, Harare	Zimbabwe by 49 runs
ODI 4840	16 February	Harare Sports Club, Harare	Ireland by 6 wickets
ODI 4842	18 February	Harare Sports Club, Harare	Zimbabwe by 9 wickets
T20I series
No.	Date	Venue	Result
T20I 3098	22 February	Harare Sports Club, Harare	No result
T20I 3101	23 February	Harare Sports Club, Harare	Zimbabwe by 3 wickets
T20I 3103	25 February	Harare Sports Club, Harare	No result

=== 2025 Oman Tri-Nation Series (round 9) ===
2024–2026 Cricket World Cup League 2 – Tri-series
No.	Date	Team 1	Team 2	Venue	Result
ODI 4826	8 February	Namibia	United States	Oman Cricket Academy Ground, Al Amarat	United States by 114 runs
ODI 4830	10 February	Oman	Namibia	Oman Cricket Academy Ground, Al Amarat	Namibia by 23 runs
ODI 4832	12 February	Oman	United States	Oman Cricket Academy Ground, Al Amarat	Oman by 7 wickets
ODI 4836	14 February	Namibia	United States	Oman Cricket Academy Ground, Al Amarat	United States by 70 runs
ODI 4839	16 February	Oman	Namibia	Oman Cricket Academy Ground, Al Amarat	Oman by 2 wickets
ODI 4841	18 February	Oman	United States	Oman Cricket Academy Ground, Al Amarat	United States by 57 runs

=== 2024–25 Pakistan Tri-Nation Series ===
Pos	Team	Pld	W	L	T	NR	Pts	NRR
1	New Zealand	2	2	0	0	0	4	0.906
2	Pakistan	2	1	1	0	0	2	−0.689
3	South Africa	2	0	2	0	0	0	−0.228

Source: ESPNcricinfo

Group stage
No.	Date	Team 1	Team 2	Venue	Result
ODI 4827	8 February	Pakistan	New Zealand	Gaddafi Stadium, Lahore	New Zealand by 78 runs
ODI 4829	10 February	New Zealand	South Africa	Gaddafi Stadium, Lahore	New Zealand by 6 wickets
ODI 4834	12 February	Pakistan	South Africa	National Stadium, Karachi	Pakistan by 6 wickets
Final
No.	Date	Team 1	Team 2	Venue	Result
ODI 4838	14 February	Pakistan	New Zealand	National Stadium, Karachi	New Zealand by 5 wickets

=== 2025 ICC Champions Trophy ===
Pos	Team	Pld	W	L	NR	Pts	NRR	Qualification
1	India	3	3	0	0	6	0.715	Advanced to the knockout stage
2	New Zealand	3	2	1	0	4	0.267	Advanced to the knockout stage
3	Bangladesh	3	0	2	1	1	−0.443	Eliminated
4	Pakistan (H)	3	0	2	1	1	−1.087	Eliminated

Source: ESPNcricinfo
Rules for classification: 1) Points; 2) Wins; 3) Net run rate; 4) Results of games between tied teams; 5) Initial group stage seedings
(H) Host

Pos	Team	Pld	W	L	NR	Pts	NRR	Qualification
1	South Africa	3	2	0	1	5	2.395	Advanced to the knockout stage
2	Australia	3	1	0	2	4	0.475	Advanced to the knockout stage
3	Afghanistan	3	1	1	1	3	−0.990	Eliminated
4	England	3	0	3	0	0	−1.159	Eliminated

Source: ESPNcricinfo
Rules for classification: 1) Points; 2) Wins; 3) Net run rate; 4) Results of games between tied teams; 5) Initial group stage seedings

Group stage
No.	Date	Team 1	Team 2	Venue	Result
ODI 4843	19 February	Pakistan	New Zealand	National Stadium, Karachi	New Zealand by 60 runs
ODI 4844	20 February	Bangladesh	India	Dubai International Cricket Stadium, Dubai	India by 6 wickets
ODI 4845	21 February	Afghanistan	South Africa	National Stadium, Karachi	South Africa by 107 runs
ODI 4846	22 February	Australia	England	Gaddafi Stadium, Lahore	Australia by 5 wickets
ODI 4847	23 February	Pakistan	India	Dubai International Cricket Stadium, Dubai	India by 6 wickets
ODI 4848	24 February	Bangladesh	New Zealand	Rawalpindi Cricket Stadium, Rawalpindi	New Zealand by 5 wickets
ODI 4848a	25 February	Australia	South Africa	Rawalpindi Cricket Stadium, Rawalpindi	Match abandoned
ODI 4849	26 February	Afghanistan	England	Gaddafi Stadium, Lahore	Afghanistan by 8 runs
ODI 4849a	27 February	Pakistan	Bangladesh	Rawalpindi Cricket Stadium, Rawalpindi	Match abandoned
ODI 4850	28 February	Afghanistan	Australia	Gaddafi Stadium, Lahore	No result
ODI 4851	1 March	England	South Africa	National Stadium, Karachi	South Africa by 7 wickets
ODI 4852	2 March	India	New Zealand	Dubai International Cricket Stadium, Dubai	India by 44 runs
Semi-finals
No.	Date	Team 1	Team 2	Venue	Result
ODI 4853	4 March	Australia	India	Dubai International Cricket Stadium, Dubai	India by 4 wickets
ODI 4855	5 March	New Zealand	South Africa	Gaddafi Stadium, Lahore	New Zealand by 50 runs
Final
No.	Date	Team 1	Team 2	Venue	Result
ODI 4858	9 March	India	New Zealand	Dubai International Cricket Stadium, Dubai	India by 4 wickets

== March ==
=== Sri Lanka women in New Zealand ===
WODI series
No.	Date	Venue	Result
WODI 1439	4 March	McLean Park, Napier	No result
WODI 1440	7 March	Saxton Oval, Nelson	New Zealand by 78 runs
WODI 1441	9 March	Saxton Oval, Nelson	New Zealand by 98 runs
WT20I series
No.	Date	Venue	Result
WT20I 2208	14 March	Hagley Oval, Christchurch	Sri Lanka by 7 wickets
WT20I 2213	16 March	Hagley Oval, Christchurch	New Zealand by 7 wickets
WT20I 2219	18 March	University of Otago Oval, Dunedin	No result

=== 2025 Namibia Tri-Nation Series (round 10) ===
2024–2026 Cricket World Cup League 2 – Tri-series
No.	Date	Team 1	Team 2	Venue	Result
ODI 4854	5 March	Canada	Netherlands	Wanderers Cricket Ground, Windhoek	No result
ODI 4856	7 March	Namibia	Netherlands	Wanderers Cricket Ground, Windhoek	Netherlands by 53 runs
ODI 4857	9 March	Namibia	Canada	Wanderers Cricket Ground, Windhoek	Match tied (DLS) (Canada won S/O)
ODI 4858a	11 March	Canada	Netherlands	Wanderers Cricket Ground, Windhoek	Match abandoned
ODI 4859	13 March	Namibia	Netherlands	Wanderers Cricket Ground, Windhoek	Netherlands by 7 wickets
ODI 4860	15 March	Namibia	Canada	Wanderers Cricket Ground, Windhoek	Namibia by 12 runs (DLS)

=== Pakistan in New Zealand ===
T20I series
No.	Date	Venue	Result
T20I 3120	16 March	Hagley Oval, Christchurch	New Zealand by 9 wickets
T20I 3122	18 March	University of Otago Oval, Dunedin	New Zealand by 5 wickets
T20I 3124	21 March	Eden Park, Auckland	Pakistan by 9 wickets
T20I 3126	23 March	Bay Oval, Mount Maunganui	New Zealand by 115 runs
T20I 3128	26 March	Wellington Regional Stadium, Wellington	New Zealand by 8 wickets
ODI series
No.	Date	Venue	Result
ODI 4861	29 March	McLean Park, Napier	New Zealand by 73 runs
ODI 4862	2 April	Seddon Park, Hamilton	New Zealand by 84 runs
ODI 4863	5 April	Bay Oval, Mount Maunganui	New Zealand by 43 runs

== See also ==
- Associate international cricket in 2024–25
- International cricket in 2024
- International cricket in 2025
