= 2024 Women's T20 World Cup qualification =

Qualification process for the 2024 WT20WC

2024 ICC Women's T20 World Cup qualification
- Dates: 29 May 2023 – 17 December 2023
- Administrators: International Cricket Council; Africa Cricket Association; Asian Cricket Council; ICC Americas; ICC East Asia-Pacific; ICC Europe
- Cricket format: Women's Twenty20 International
- Participants: 46
- Matches: 131

The 2024 Women's T20 World Cup qualification was the process by which teams qualified for the 2024 ICC Women's T20 World Cup in the United Arab Emirates. A series of regional qualification tournaments determined the teams which will take part in the Global Qualifier in April and May 2024, where the two finalists would qualify for the World Cup. The qualification process was announced on 10 April 2022.

In total, 46 countries took part in the regional qualification process to advance to the Global Qualifier. Regional tournaments were held between May and December 2023. These included Europe qualifier (8 teams), EAP qualifier (7 teams), Americas qualifier (4 teams), Asia qualifier (11 teams) and Africa qualifier (14 teams) and Global Qualifier (10 teams).

== Qualified teams ==
Qualified teams for the 2024 Women's T20 World Cup. Qualified automatically Qualified via the ICC Women's T20I Team Rankings Qualified via the Global Qualifier Qualified for the Global Qualifier, but failed to reach the T20 World Cup. Participated in the regional qualifiers but failed to progress to the Global Qualifier

Team	Method of qualification	Date of qualification	Venues	Total times qualified	First time qualified	Last time qualified	Current consecutive appearances	Previous best performance
Bangladesh	Hosts	26 July 2022	—N/a	6	2014	2023	6	Group stage (2014, 2016, 2018, 2020, 2023)
Australia	Top 6 in 2023	26 February 2023	South Africa	9	2009	2023	9	Winners (2010, 2012, 2014, 2018, 2020, 2023)
England	Top 6 in 2023	26 February 2023	South Africa	9	2009	2023	9	Winners (2009)
India	Top 6 in 2023	26 February 2023	South Africa	9	2009	2023	9	Runners-up (2020)
South Africa	Top 6 in 2023	26 February 2023	South Africa	9	2009	2023	9	Runners-up (2023)
New Zealand	Top 6 in 2023	26 February 2023	South Africa	9	2009	2023	9	Runners-up (2009, 2010)
West Indies	Top 6 in 2023	26 February 2023	South Africa	9	2009	2023	9	Winners (2016)
Pakistan	ICC Women's T20I; Team Rankings	27 February 2023	–	9	2009	2023	9	Group stage (nine times)
Scotland	Finalists in Global Qualifier	5 May 2024	United Arab Emirates	–	–	–	–	Debut
Sri Lanka	Finalists in Global Qualifier	5 May 2024	United Arab Emirates	9	2009	2023	9	Group stage (nine times)

== Africa Qualifier ==
The African qualifier had two stages, the sub-regional qualifier and the regional final. With the top two teams from the sub-regional qualifiers advancing to the regional final. The sub-regional qualifiers were held in Botswana.

=== Sub-regional qualifier ===
The top two from the Sub-regional qualifier reach the Regional Final.

Group A

Pos	Team	Pld	W	L	NR	Pts	NRR	Qualification
1	Kenya	3	3	0	0	6	6.719	Advanced to the play-offs
2	Botswana	3	2	1	0	4	1.117	Advanced to the play-offs
3	Malawi	3	1	2	0	2	1.445	
4	Lesotho	3	0	3	0	0	−8.617	

Source: Report
Group B

Pos	Team	Pld	W	L	NR	Pts	NRR	Qualification
1	Sierra Leone	3	3	0	0	6	6.195	Advanced to the play-offs
2	Cameroon	3	2	1	0	4	0.587	Advanced to the play-offs
3	Mozambique	3	1	2	0	2	0.140	
4	Eswatini	3	0	3	0	0	−5.183	

Source: Report

==== Bracket ====
Semi-finals
A2	Botswana	131/7 (20)
B1	Sierra Leone	114/5 (20)
A1	Kenya	156/5 (20)
B2	Cameroon	38 (14.4)

Final
A2	Botswana	52 (14.2)
A1	Kenya	53/1 (8.1)
3rd place play-off
B2	Cameroon	68/6 (20)
B1	Sierra Leone	72/3 (9.5)

=== Regional final ===
The two finalists from the Sub-regional qualifier advanced to the Global qualifier. The regional Final was held in Uganda between 9–17 December 2023. Those teams were Zimbabwe and hosts Uganda.

Group A

Pos	Team	Pld	W	L	NR	Pts	NRR	Qualification
1	Zimbabwe	3	3	0	0	6	3.524	Advanced to the play-offs
2	Tanzania	3	2	1	0	4	0.779	Advanced to the play-offs
3	Kenya	3	1	2	0	2	−1.491	
4	Botswana	3	0	3	0	0	−4.530	

Source: Report
Group B

Pos	Team	Pld	W	L	NR	Pts	NRR	Qualification
1	Uganda	3	3	0	0	6	0.960	Advanced to the play-offs
2	Namibia	3	2	1	0	4	0.204	Advanced to the play-offs
3	Nigeria	3	1	2	0	2	−0.687	
4	Rwanda	3	0	3	0	0	−0.726	

Source: Report

==== Bracket ====
Semi-finals
A1	Zimbabwe	150/6 (20)
B2	Namibia	64 (16.2)
A2	Tanzania	89 (19.2)
B1	Uganda	99/4 (20)

Final
Zimbabwe	85/4 (14.4)
Uganda	79 (20)
3rd place play-off
Namibia
Tanzania

== Americas Qualifier ==
The Americas qualifier was a four-team double round-robin group that was held in Los Angeles, United States from the 4–11 September 2023. United States would win all their matches to qualify for the Global Qualifier.

=== Group standings ===
Pos	Team	Pld	W	L	NR	Pts	NRR	Qualification
1	United States	6	6	0	0	12	2.674	Advanced to the global qualifier
2	Canada	6	4	2	0	8	1.508	
3	Brazil	6	2	4	0	4	−0.903	
4	Argentina	6	0	6	0	0	−3.170	

Source: ESPNCricinfo

== Asia Qualifier ==
The Asia qualifier was held in Malaysia between 31 August to 9 September 2023. Thailand and the United Arab Emirates qualified for the Global Qualifier after reaching the final of the qualifier

Group A

Pos	Team	Pld	W	L	NR	Pts	NRR	Qualification
1	United Arab Emirates	5	4	0	1	9	3.339	Advanced to the knockout stage
2	Nepal	5	4	0	1	9	2.184	Advanced to the knockout stage
3	Malaysia	5	2	2	1	5	0.647	
4	Bhutan	5	1	3	1	3	−1.306	
5	Bahrain	5	1	3	1	3	−2.773	
6	Qatar	5	0	4	1	1	−1.647	

Source: Report
Group B

Pos	Team	Pld	W	L	NR	Pts	NRR	Qualification
1	Thailand	4	3	0	1	7	3.558	Advanced to the knockout stage
2	Hong Kong	4	3	1	0	6	0.999	Advanced to the knockout stage
3	Kuwait	4	2	1	1	5	−0.239	
4	China	4	1	3	0	2	−1.147	
5	Myanmar	4	0	4	0	0	−2.550	

Source: Report

=== Bracket ===
Semi-finals
A1	United Arab Emirates	141/4 (20)
B2	Hong Kong	84 (16.5)
B1	Thailand	105/2 (20)
A2	Nepal	59 (19.3)

Final
A1	United Arab Emirates	70/9 (20)
B1	Thailand	64 (17.5)

== East Asia-Pacific Qualifier ==
In East Asia-Pacific, a seven-team round-robin group was played to decide the sole ticket to the Global Qualifier from the region. The East Asia-Pacific qualifier was held in Port Vila, Vanuatu on 1–8 September 2023. Vanuatu won every game to reach the Global Qualifier, becoming the first cricket team from the country to reach a Global Qualifier.

=== Final standings ===
Pos	Team	Pld	W	L	NR	Pts	NRR	Qualification
1	Vanuatu	6	6	0	0	12	2.401	Advanced to the global qualifier
2	Papua New Guinea	6	5	1	0	10	3.623	
3	Indonesia	6	4	2	0	8	1.071	
4	Japan	6	3	3	0	6	−0.036	
5	Samoa	6	1	5	0	2	−2.003	
6	Cook Islands	6	1	5	0	2	−2.199	
7	Fiji	6	1	5	0	2	−2.964	

Source: Report

== Europe Qualifier ==
The European qualifier was held in two stages, Division Two and Division One. The top two from Division Two will advance to Division One to meet pre-qualified Netherlands and Scotland in a four-team round robin group, where they will fight for two spots in the Global Qualifier.

=== Division Two ===
Pos	Team	Pld	W	L	NR	Pts	NRR	Qualification
1	France	5	4	1	0	8	1.736	Advanced to Division One
2	Italy	5	4	1	0	8	0.833	Advanced to Division One
3	Jersey	5	3	2	0	6	2.674	
4	Germany	5	3	2	0	6	0.939	
5	Sweden	5	1	4	0	2	−1.408	
6	Turkey	5	0	5	0	0	−5.507	

Source: Report

=== Division One ===
Netherlands and Scotland both finished top two and secured places to the Global Qualifier.

Pos	Team	Pld	W	L	NR	Pts	NRR	Qualification
1	Scotland	6	5	1	0	10	3.777	Advanced to the global qualifier
2	Netherlands	6	5	1	0	10	2.377	Advanced to the global qualifier
3	Italy	6	2	4	0	4	−1.982	
4	France	6	0	6	0	0	−4.566	

Source: Report

== Global Qualifier ==
The Global Qualifier was held in Abu Dhabi, United Arab Emirates from 25 April to 7 May 2024. This is first Women's T20 World Cup qualifier to have 10 teams, up from 8 from the previous 5 editions. The two finalists qualified for the 2024 ICC Women's T20 World Cup in Bangladesh.

Scotland and Sri Lanka both made the final and reached the 2024 ICC Women's T20 World Cup. The Scots reached the T20 World Cup for the first time ever.

=== Group stage ===
Group A

Pos	Team	Pld	W	L	T	NR	Pts	NRR	Qualification
1	Sri Lanka	4	4	0	0	0	8	2.778	Advanced to the playoffs
2	Scotland	4	3	1	0	0	6	1.473	Advanced to the playoffs
3	Thailand	4	2	2	0	0	4	0.161	
4	Uganda	4	1	3	0	0	2	−2.856	
5	United States	4	0	4	0	0	0	−1.813	

Source: Report
Group B

Pos	Team	Pld	W	L	T	NR	Pts	NRR	Qualification
1	Ireland	4	4	0	0	0	8	2.462	Advance to the playoffs
2	United Arab Emirates (H)	4	2	2	0	0	4	0.976	Advance to the playoffs
3	Netherlands	4	2	2	0	0	4	0.111	
4	Zimbabwe	4	1	3	0	0	2	−0.844	
5	Vanuatu	4	1	3	0	0	2	−2.537	

Source: Report
(H) Host

==== Bracket ====
Semi-finals
A1	Sri Lanka	149/6 (20 overs)
B2	United Arab Emirates	134/7 (20 overs)
B1	Ireland	110/9 (20 overs)
A2	Scotland	112/2 (16.2 overs)

Final
SFW1	Sri Lanka	169/5 (20 overs)
SFW2	Scotland	101/7 (20 overs)
