= 2024 Women's T20 World Cup =

International cricket tournament

2024 ICC Women's T20 World Cup
- Tournament logo
- Dates: 3 – 20 October 2024
- Administrator: International Cricket Council
- Cricket format: Women's Twenty20 International
- Tournament format(s): Group stage and knockout stage
- Host: United Arab Emirates
- Champions: New Zealand (1st title)
- Runners-up: South Africa
- Participants: 10
- Matches: 23
- Attendance: 91,030 (3,958 per match)
- Player of the series: (New Zealand) Amelia Kerr
- Most runs: (South Africa) Laura Wolvaardt (223)
- Most wickets: (New Zealand) Amelia Kerr (15)
- Official website: icc-cricket.com

The 2024 ICC Women's T20 World Cup was the ninth edition of the ICC Women's T20 World Cup and was hosted by the Bangladesh Cricket Board from 3 to 20 October 2024. Ten teams competed in 23 matches across two venues in the United Arab Emirates.

The ten participants included a host team, top six teams from the previous edition, one highest-ranked teams in the ICC Women's T20I Team Rankings not already qualified, and two other teams determined through a series of qualifiers. Scotland qualified for the Women's T20 World Cup for the first time.

Australia were the defending champions and were defeated in the semi-final by South Africa. New Zealand defeated South Africa by 32 runs in the final to win their maiden title. The tournament was attended by a total of 91,030 spectators across the 23 matches.

== Background ==
The ICC Women's T20 World Cup is a biennial world cup for women's cricket in Women's Twenty20 International (WT20I) format, organised by the International Cricket Council (ICC). It was first played in 2009 in England, and the 2024 tournament marked its ninth edition. The eighth edition, held in 2023 in South Africa after being delayed from 2022 due to the COVID-19 pandemic, was contested by 10 teams, and was won by Australia, who defeated hosts South Africa in the final.

=== Host selection ===
In July 2022, as part of the 2024–2027 ICC women's hosts cycle, the ICC announced that the 2024 Women's T20 World Cup would be played in Bangladesh. The Bangladesh Cricket Board (BCB) had previously hosted the competition in 2014. In August 2024 following the resignation of the Bangladeshi Prime Minister Sheikh Hasina and the violence it resulted in, the ICC announced that the tournament would be shifted to the United Arab Emirates, with the BCB remaining as the formal hosts.

Former Bangladeshi Prime Minister Sheikh Hasina posing with Women's T20 World Cup trophy delegation at Ganabhaban in Sher-e-Bangla Nagar, Dhaka.

=== Format ===
The 10 qualifying teams were divided into two groups of five teams each. In the group stage, each team played every other team in its group once in a round-robin format. The top two teams from each group advanced to the knockout stage, which consisted of two semi-finals, with the winners facing off in the final.

=== Schedule ===
In the 2022–2025 ICC Women's Future Tours Programme, the tournament was scheduled to be held in September–October 2024. The ICC announced the initial schedule on 5 May 2024 and the revised tournament schedule on 26 August 2024, with the tournament scheduled to take place from 3 to 20 October 2024. On 27 August 2024, the ICC announced that the warm-up matches would be played from 28 September to 1 October across three venues in Dubai.

=== Prize money ===
The ICC allocated a pool of US$7.96 million in prize money for the tournament; more than double of the prize money pool for the 2023 edition. The winners would receive at least $2.34 million, with each team receiving an additional $31,154 for each match they won, excluding the semi-finals and final.

Prize money allocation for the tournament
| Place | Teams | Amount | |
| Place | Teams | per side | Total |
|---|---|---|---|
| Champions | 1 | $2.34 million | $2.34 million |
| Runners-up | 1 | $1.17 million | $1.17 million |
| Semi-finalists | 2 | $675,000 | $1.35 million |
| 5th–10th place (Group stage) | 6 | $67,500 | $405,000 |
| Match winners | 20 | $31,154 | $623,080 |
| Total | 10 | $7,96 million | |

=== Marketing ===
The ICC hosted a trophy tour, before the tournament, which began on 3 September in Dubai, and the trophy was taken to various locations around the world. A dedicated "the ICC Anthem" composed by Lorne Balfe was released on 16 September under the Warner Music India label. The official theme song for the tournament, "Whatever It Takes", performed by W.i.S.H., composed by Parth Parekh and produced by Bay Music House was released on 22 September under the Sony Music India label. A promotional event, the "Captains' Day", featuring all the team captains was held on 2 October in Dubai.

== Qualification ==
In April 2022, the ICC confirmed the qualification process for the tournament. The teams who directly qualified for the 2024 tournament were Bangladesh (the hosts) along with the top six teams from the 2023 tournament: Australia, England, India, New Zealand, South Africa and the West Indies. The remaining direct qualification spot was allocated to the next best-ranked team in the ICC Women's T20I Team Rankings which had not already qualified as of 27 February 2023: Pakistan. The two remaining places were filled by Scotland and Sri Lanka through the global qualifier in May 2024.

Highlighted are the countries that participated in the 2024 Women's T20 World Cup qualification pathway. Qualified directly (hosts, top 5 from the previous tournament, or via WT20I Rankings) Qualified via the global qualifier Participated in the qualifiers but failed to qualify

Teams qualified for the tournament
| Method of qualification | No. of teams | Teams |
|---|---|---|
| Hosts | 1 | Bangladesh |
| 2023 Women's T20 World Cup (Top 6 teams from the previous tournament) | 6 | Australia |
| 2023 Women's T20 World Cup (Top 6 teams from the previous tournament) | 6 | England |
| 2023 Women's T20 World Cup (Top 6 teams from the previous tournament) | 6 | India |
| 2023 Women's T20 World Cup (Top 6 teams from the previous tournament) | 6 | New Zealand |
| 2023 Women's T20 World Cup (Top 6 teams from the previous tournament) | 6 | South Africa |
| 2023 Women's T20 World Cup (Top 6 teams from the previous tournament) | 6 | West Indies |
| ICC Women's T20I Team Rankings | 1 | Pakistan |
| 2024 Women's T20 World Cup Global Qualifier | 2 | Scotland |
| 2024 Women's T20 World Cup Global Qualifier | 2 | Sri Lanka |
| Total | 10 | |

== Venues ==
In July 2022, the BCB announced that Sher-e-Bangla National Cricket Stadium in Dhaka and Sylhet International Cricket Stadium in Sylhet, would host the tournament matches. However after the tournament was shifted to the United Arab Emirates, matches were instead played at Dubai International Cricket Stadium in Dubai and Sharjah Cricket Stadium in Sharjah.

Venues in the United Arab Emirates
A map of United Arab Emirates with pin-points on 2024 Women's T20 World Cup venues
| Dubai | Sharjah |
| Dubai International Cricket Stadium | Sharjah Cricket Stadium |
| Capacity: 25,000 | Capacity: 16,000 |
| Matches: 12 (Semi-final 1 and final) | Matches: 11 (Semi-final 2) |
| Dubai International Cricket Stadium in 2019 | Sharjah Cricket Stadium in 1998 |

== Squads ==
Each team was allowed a maximum squad size of 15 players and was to submit the squad to the ICC before the tournament. Any changes after this required permission from the ICC's event technical committee.

== Match officials ==
On 24 September 2024, the ICC appointed an all-women panel of match officials made up of three match referees and ten umpires for the tournament.

Match referees

- (South Africa) Shandre Fritz
- (India) G. S. Lakshmi
- (Sri Lanka) Michell Pereira

Umpires

- (South Africa) Lauren Agenbag
- (New Zealand) Kim Cotton
- (Zimbabwe) Sarah Dambanevana
- (England) Anna Harris
- (Sri Lanka) Nimali Perera
- (Australia) Claire Polosak
- (India) Vrinda Rathi
- (England) Sue Redfern
- (Australia) Eloise Sheridan
- (Cricket West Indies) Jacqueline Williams

== Warm-up matches ==
Ten warm-up matches were played from 28 September to 1 October 2024 at three venues in Dubai: The Sevens Stadium, ICC Academy Ground No. 1 and No. 2.

Warm-up match 1
28 September 2024
18:00 UTC+4 (N)
Scorecard

| Pakistan; 132/9 (20 overs) | v | Scotland; 133/2 (18 overs) |
| Omaima Sohail 30 (29); Kathryn Bryce 3/22 (3 overs) | | Sarah Bryce 60* (52); Nashra Sandhu 1/11 (3 overs) |

Scotland won by 8 wickets
The Sevens Stadium, Dubai
Umpires: Claire Polosak (Aus) and Jacqueline Williams (WI)

- Pakistan won the toss and elected to bat.

Warm-up match 2
28 September 2024
18:00 UTC+4 (N)
Scorecard

| Sri Lanka; 143/7 (20 overs) | v | Bangladesh; 110/9 (20 overs) |
| Hasini Perera 43 (39); Shorna Akter 2/19 (3 overs) | | Nigar Sultana 30* (38); Sugandika Kumari 3/8 (2 overs) |

Sri Lanka won by 33 runs
ICC Academy Ground No.1, Dubai
Umpires: Lauren Agenbag (SA) and Sue Redfern (Eng)

- Bangladesh won the toss and elected to field.

Warm-up match 3
29 September 2024
18:00 UTC+4 (N)
Scorecard

| South Africa; 92 (20 overs) | v | New Zealand; 95/2 (14.2 overs) |
| Laura Wolvaardt 33 (37); Leigh Kasperek 3/7 (4 overs) | | Amelia Kerr 37 (37); Seshnie Naidu 1/12 (2 overs) |

New Zealand won by 8 wickets
The Sevens Stadium, Dubai
Umpires: Anna Harris (Eng) and Vrinda Rathi (Ind)

- New Zealand won the toss and elected to field.

Warm-up match 4
29 September 2024
18:00 UTC+4 (N)
Scorecard

| India; 141/8 (20 overs) | v | West Indies; 121/8 (20 overs) |
| Jemimah Rodrigues 52 (40); Hayley Matthews 4/17 (4 overs) | | Chinelle Henry 59* (46); Pooja Vastrakar 3/14 (4 overs) |

India won by 20 runs
ICC Academy Ground No. 2, Dubai
Umpires: Sarah Dambanevana (Zim) and Eloise Sheridan (Aus)

- West Indies won the toss and elected to field.

Warm-up match 5
29 September 2024
18:00 UTC+4 (N)
Scorecard

| Australia; 162/6 (20 overs) | v | England; 129 (19.4 overs) |
| Beth Mooney 50 (30); Lauren Bell 2/29 (4 overs) | | Alice Capsey 40 (34); Tahlia McGrath 3/18 (3 overs) |

Australia won by 33 runs
ICC Academy Ground No.1, Dubai
Umpires: Lauren Agenbag (SA) Nimali Perera (SL)

- England won the toss and elected to field.

Warm-up match 6
30 September 2024
18:00 UTC+4 (N)
Scorecard

| Scotland; 58 (19 overs) | v | Sri Lanka; 59/5 (15.3 overs) |
| Sarah Bryce 24 (43); Udeshika Prabodhani 2/3 (2 overs) | | Kavisha Dilhari 27 (34); Katherine Fraser 1/5 (1.3 overs) |

Sri Lanka won by 5 wickets
The Sevens Stadium, Dubai
Umpires: Kim Cotton (NZ) and Sue Redfern (Eng)

- Scotland won the toss and elected to bat.

Warm-up match 7
30 September 2024
18:00 UTC+4 (N)
Scorecard

| Bangladesh; 140/7 (20 overs) | v | Pakistan; 117 (18.4 overs) |
| Shorna Akter 28* (17); Sadia Iqbal 2/19 (4 overs) | | Omaima Sohail 33 (33); Shorna Akter 2/16 (3 overs) |

Bangladesh won by 23 runs
ICC Academy Ground No. 2, Dubai
Umpires: Claire Polosak (Aus) and Nimali Perera (SL)

- Bangladesh won the toss and elected to bat.

Warm-up match 8
1 October 2024
18:00 UTC+4 (N)
Scorecard

| Australia; 144/8 (20 overs) | v | West Indies; 109 (17.5 overs) |
| Annabel Sutherland 38 (28); Aaliyah Alleyne 2/24 (3 overs) | | Hayley Matthews 42 (46); Alana King 4/30 (3.5 overs) |

Australia won by 35 runs
The Sevens Stadium, Dubai
Umpires: Sarah Dambanevana (Zim) and Anna Harris (Eng)

- West Indies won the toss and elected to field.

Warm-up match 9
1 October 2024
18:00 UTC+4 (N)
Scorecard

| New Zealand; 127/4 (20 overs) | v | England; 131/5 (17 overs) |
| Amelia Kerr 64* (46); Lauren Bell 1/13 (3 overs) | | Danni Wyatt 35 (19); Lea Tahuhu 2/14 (2 overs) |

England won by 5 wickets
ICC Academy Ground No. 2, Dubai
Umpires: Vrinda Rathi (Ind) and Jacqueline Williams (WI)

- New Zealand won the toss and elected to bat.

Warm-up match 10
1 October 2024
18:00 UTC+4 (N)
Scorecard

| India; 144/7 (20 overs) | v | South Africa; 116/6 (20 overs) |
| Richa Ghosh 36 (25); Ayabonga Khaka 5/25 (4 overs) | | Laura Wolvaardt 29 (26); Asha Sobhana 2/21 (3 overs) |

India won by 28 runs
ICC Academy Ground No. 1, Dubai
Umpires: Kim Cotton (NZ) and Eloise Sheridan (Aus)

- South Africa won the toss and elected to field.

== Group stage ==
The ICC announced the groups and fixtures on 5 May 2024. After the tournament was shifted to the United Arab Emirates, the revised schedule was announced on 26 August 2024. The 10 teams were divided into two groups of five, with each team facing the other teams in the group once. The group stage featured a total of 20 matches. The opening match was played between Bangladesh and Scotland at Sharjah on 3 October. The following table lists teams in order of their initial group stage seedings.

| Group A | Group B |
|---|---|
| Australia; India; New Zealand; Pakistan; Sri Lanka | South Africa; England; West Indies; Bangladesh; Scotland |

=== Group A ===
Group A standings
| Pos | Team | Pld | W | L | NR | Pts | NRR | Qualification |
|---|---|---|---|---|---|---|---|---|
| 1 | Australia | 4 | 4 | 0 | 0 | 8 | 2.223 | Advanced to the knockout stage |
| 2 | New Zealand | 4 | 3 | 1 | 0 | 6 | 0.879 | Advanced to the knockout stage |
| 3 | India | 4 | 2 | 2 | 0 | 4 | 0.322 | Eliminated |
| 4 | Pakistan | 4 | 1 | 3 | 0 | 2 | −1.040 | Eliminated |
| 5 | Sri Lanka | 4 | 0 | 4 | 0 | 0 | −2.173 | Eliminated |

Source: ESPNcricinfo
Rules for classification: 1) Points; 2) Wins; 3) Net run rate; 4) Results of games between tied teams; 5) Initial group stage seedings

Match 2
3 October 2024
18:00 UTC+4 (N)
Scorecard

| Pakistan; 116 (20 overs) | v | Sri Lanka; 85/9 (20 overs) |
| Fatima Sana 30 (20); Chamari Athapaththu 3/18 (4 overs) | | Nilakshi de Silva 22 (25); Sadia Iqbal 3/17 (4 overs) |

Pakistan won by 31 runs
Sharjah Cricket Stadium, Sharjah
Umpires: Kim Cotton (NZ) and Eloise Sheridan (Aus)
Player of the match: Fatima Sana (Pak)

- Pakistan won the toss and elected to bat.

Match 4
4 October 2024
18:00 UTC+4 (N)
Scorecard

| New Zealand; 160/4 (20 overs) | v | India; 102 (19 overs) |
| Sophie Devine 57* (36); Renuka Singh Thakur 2/27 (4 overs) | | Harmanpreet Kaur 15 (14); Rosemary Mair 4/19 (4 overs) |

New Zealand won by 58 runs
Dubai International Cricket Stadium, Dubai
Umpires: Anna Harris (Eng) and Jacqueline Williams (WI)
Player of the match: Sophie Devine (NZ)

- New Zealand won the toss and elected to bat.

Match 5
5 October 2024
14:00 UTC+4
Scorecard

| Sri Lanka; 93/7 (20 overs) | v | Australia; 94/4 (14.2 overs) |
| Nilakshi de Silva 29* (40); Megan Schutt 3/12 (4 overs) | | Beth Mooney 43* (38); Sugandika Kumari 1/16 (2.2 overs) |

Australia won by 6 wickets
Sharjah Cricket Stadium, Sharjah
Umpires: Anna Harris (Eng) and Sue Redfern (Eng)
Player of the match: Megan Schutt (Aus)

- Sri Lanka won the toss and elected to bat.

Match 7
6 October 2024
14:00 UTC+4
Scorecard

| Pakistan; 105/8 (20 overs) | v | India; 108/4 (18.5 overs) |
| Nida Dar 28 (34); Arundhati Reddy 3/19 (4 overs) | | Shafali Verma 32 (35); Fatima Sana 2/23 (4 overs) |

India won by 6 wickets
Dubai International Cricket Stadium, Dubai
Umpires: Lauren Agenbag (SA) and Eloise Sheridan (Aus)
Player of the match: Arundhati Reddy (Ind)

- Pakistan won the toss and elected to bat.
- This was the 100th T20I match (across both men's and women's) to be hosted at this venue.

Match 10
8 October 2024
18:00 UTC+4 (N)
Scorecard

| Australia; 148/8 (20 overs) | v | New Zealand; 88 (19.2 overs) |
| Beth Mooney 40 (32); Amelia Kerr 4/26 (4 overs) | | Amelia Kerr 29 (31); Megan Schutt 3/3 (3.2 overs) |

Australia won by 60 runs
Sharjah Cricket Stadium, Sharjah
Umpires: Vrinda Rathi (Ind) and Sue Redfern (Eng)
Player of the match: Megan Schutt (Aus)

- Australia won the toss and elected to bat.
- Alyssa Healy (Aus) scored her 3,000th run in WT20Is.
- Ellyse Perry (Aus) scored her 2,000th run and took her 100th wicket in WT20Is.

Match 12
9 October 2024
18:00 UTC+4 (N)
Scorecard

| India; 172/3 (20 overs) | v | Sri Lanka; 90 (19.5 overs) |
| Harmanpreet Kaur 52* (27); Ama Kanchana 1/29 (3 overs) | | Kavisha Dilhari 21 (22); Arundhati Reddy 3/19 (4 overs); Asha Sobhana 3/19 (4 overs) |

India won by 82 runs
Dubai International Cricket Stadium, Dubai
Umpires: Lauren Agenbag (SA) and Kim Cotton (NZ)
Player of the match: Harmanpreet Kaur (Ind)

- India won the toss and elected to bat.
- Shafali Verma (Ind) became the youngest cricketer to score 2,000 runs in WT20Is.
- Sri Lanka were eliminated as a result of this match.

Match 14
11 October 2024
18:00 UTC+4 (N)
Scorecard

| Pakistan; 82 (19.5 overs) | v | Australia; 83/1 (11 overs) |
| Aliya Riaz 26 (32); Ashleigh Gardner 4/21 (4 overs) | | Alyssa Healy 37* (23); Sadia Iqbal 1/17 (3 overs) |

Australia won by 9 wickets
Dubai International Cricket Stadium, Dubai
Umpires: Anna Harris (Eng) and Vrinda Rathi (Ind)
Player of the match: Ashleigh Gardner (Aus)

- Australia won the toss and elected to field.
- Muneeba Ali captained Pakistan in WT20Is for the first time.

Match 15
12 October 2024
14:00 UTC+4
Scorecard

| Sri Lanka; 115/5 (20 overs) | v | New Zealand; 118/2 (17.3 overs) |
| Chamari Athapaththu 35 (41); Amelia Kerr 2/13 (4 overs) | | Georgia Plimmer 53 (44); Chamari Athapaththu 1/8 (2 overs) |

New Zealand won by 8 wickets
Sharjah Cricket Stadium, Sharjah
Umpires: Sarah Dambanevana (Zim) and Anna Harris (Eng)
Player of the match: Georgia Plimmer (NZ)

- Sri Lanka won the toss and elected to bat.

Match 18
13 October 2024
18:00 UTC+4 (N)
Scorecard

| Australia; 151/8 (20 overs) | v | India; 142/9 (20 overs) |
| Grace Harris 40 (41); Renuka Singh Thakur 2/24 (4 overs) | | Harmanpreet Kaur 54* (47); Annabel Sutherland 2/22 (4 overs) |

Australia won by 9 runs
Sharjah Cricket Stadium, Sharjah
Umpires: Kim Cotton (NZ) and Sue Redfern (Eng)
Player of the match: Sophie Molineux (Aus)

- Australia won the toss and elected to bat.
- Tahlia McGrath (Aus) scored her 1,000th run in WT20Is.
- Pooja Vastrakar (Ind) took her 100th wicket in international cricket.
- Australia qualified for their ninth consecutive T20 World Cup semi-final as a result of this match.

Match 19
14 October 2024
18:00 UTC+4 (N)
Scorecard

| New Zealand; 110/6 (20 overs) | v | Pakistan; 56 (11.4 overs) |
| Suzie Bates 28 (29); Nashra Sandhu 3/18 (4 overs) | | Fatima Sana 21 (23); Amelia Kerr 3/14 (2.4 overs) |

New Zealand won by 54 runs
Dubai International Cricket Stadium, Dubai
Umpires: Nimali Perera (SL) and Vrinda Rathi (Ind)
Player of the match: Eden Carson (NZ)

- New Zealand won the toss and elected to bat.
- New Zealand qualified for their fifth T20 World Cup semi-final as a result of this match while India and Pakistan were eliminated as a result of this match.

=== Group B ===
Group B standings
| Pos | Team | Pld | W | L | NR | Pts | NRR | Qualification |
|---|---|---|---|---|---|---|---|---|
| 1 | West Indies | 4 | 3 | 1 | 0 | 6 | 1.504 | Advanced to the knockout stage |
| 2 | South Africa | 4 | 3 | 1 | 0 | 6 | 1.382 | Advanced to the knockout stage |
| 3 | England | 4 | 3 | 1 | 0 | 6 | 1.117 | Eliminated |
| 4 | Bangladesh | 4 | 1 | 3 | 0 | 2 | −0.844 | Eliminated |
| 5 | Scotland | 4 | 0 | 4 | 0 | 0 | −3.129 | Eliminated |

Source: ESPNcricinfo
Rules for classification: 1) Points; 2) Wins; 3) Net run rate; 4) Results of games between tied teams; 5) Initial group stage seedings

Match 1
3 October 2024
14:00 UTC+4
Scorecard

| Bangladesh; 119/7 (20 overs) | v | Scotland; 103/7 (20 overs) |
| Sobhana Mostary 36 (38); Saskia Horley 3/13 (2 overs) | | Sarah Bryce 49* (52); Ritu Moni 2/15 (4 overs) |

Bangladesh won by 16 runs
Sharjah Cricket Stadium, Sharjah
Umpires: Lauren Agenbag (SA) and Claire Polosak (Aus)
Player of the match: Ritu Moni (Ban)

- Bangladesh won the toss and elected to bat.
- Taj Nehar (Ban) made her WT20I debut.
- Nigar Sultana (Ban) played in her 100th WT20I match.
- Nahida Akter became the first Bangladeshi cricketer to take 100 wickets in WT20Is.

Match 3
4 October 2024
14:00 UTC+4
Scorecard

| West Indies; 118/6 (20 overs) | v | South Africa; 119/0 (17.5 overs) |
| Stafanie Taylor 44* (41); Nonkululeko Mlaba 4/29 (4 overs) | | Laura Wolvaardt 59* (55) |

South Africa won by 10 wickets
Dubai International Cricket Stadium, Dubai
Umpires: Nimali Perera (SL) and Vrinda Rathi (Ind)
Player of the match: Nonkululeko Mlaba (SA)

- South Africa won the toss and elected to field.

Match 6
5 October 2024
18:00 UTC+4 (N)
Scorecard

| England; 118/7 (20 overs) | v | Bangladesh; 97/7 (20 overs) |
| Danni Wyatt-Hodge 41 (40); Fahima Khatun 2/18 (4 overs) | | Sobhana Mostary 44 (48); Linsey Smith 2/11 (4 overs) |

England won by 21 runs
Sharjah Cricket Stadium, Sharjah
Umpires: Sarah Dambanevana (Zim) and Nimali Perera (SL)
Player of the match: Danni Wyatt-Hodge (Eng)

- England won the toss and elected to bat.

Match 8
6 October 2024
18:00 UTC+4 (N)
Scorecard

| Scotland; 99/8 (20 overs) | v | West Indies; 101/4 (11.4 overs) |
| Ailsa Lister 26 (33); Afy Fletcher 3/22 (4 overs) | | Qiana Joseph 31 (18); Olivia Bell 2/18 (3 overs) |

West Indies won by 6 wickets
Dubai International Cricket Stadium, Dubai
Umpires: Kim Cotton (NZ) and Sue Redfern (Eng)
Player of the match: Chinelle Henry (WIN)

- Scotland won the toss and elected to bat.
- This was the first time Scotland and West Indies faced each other in WT20Is.
- Hayley Matthews (WI) took her 100th wicket in WT20Is.

Match 9
7 October 2024
18:00 UTC+4 (N)
Scorecard

| South Africa; 124/6 (20 overs) | v | England; 125/3 (19.2 overs) |
| Laura Wolvaardt 42 (39); Sophie Ecclestone 2/15 (4 overs) | | Nat Sciver-Brunt 48* (36); Marizanne Kapp 1/17 (4 overs) |

England won by 7 wickets
Sharjah Cricket Stadium, Sharjah
Umpires: Claire Polosak (Aus) and Jacqueline Williams (WI)
Player of the match: Sophie Ecclestone (Eng)

- South Africa won the toss and elected to bat.

Match 11
9 October 2024
14:00 UTC+4
Scorecard

| South Africa; 166/5 (20 overs) | v | Scotland; 86 (17.5 overs) |
| Marizanne Kapp 43 (24); Katherine Fraser 1/15 (2 overs) | | Katherine Fraser 14 (21); Nonkululeko Mlaba 3/12 (4 overs) |

South Africa won by 80 runs
Dubai International Cricket Stadium, Dubai
Umpires: Eloise Sheridan (Aus) and Jacqueline Williams (WI)
Player of the match: Marizanne Kapp (SA)

- South Africa won the toss and elected to bat.
- This was the first time South Africa and Scotland faced each other in WT20Is.
- Scotland were eliminated as a result of this match.

Match 13
10 October 2024
18:00 UTC+4 (N)
Scorecard

| Bangladesh; 103/8 (20 overs) | v | West Indies; 104/2 (12.5 overs) |
| Nigar Sultana 39 (44); Karishma Ramharack 4/17 (4 overs) | | Hayley Matthews 34 (22); Marufa Akter 1/20 (3 overs) |

West Indies won by 8 wickets
Sharjah Cricket Stadium, Sharjah
Umpires: Sarah Dambanevana (Zim) and Claire Polosak (Aus)
Player of the match: Karishma Ramharack (WI)

- West Indies won the toss and elected to field.
- Mandy Mangru (WI) made her WT20I debut.
- Nigar Sultana (Ban) became the first Bangladeshi cricketer to score 2,000 runs in WT20Is.

Match 16
12 October 2024
18:00 UTC+4 (N)
Scorecard

| Bangladesh; 106/3 (20 overs) | v | South Africa; 107/3 (17.2 overs) |
| Sobhana Mostary 38 (43); Annerie Dercksen 1/7 (1 over) | | Tazmin Brits 42 (41); Fahima Khatun 2/19 (4 overs) |

South Africa won by 7 wickets
Dubai International Cricket Stadium, Dubai
Umpires: Nimali Perera (SL) and Jacqueline Williams (WI)
Player of the match: Tazmin Brits (SA)

- Bangladesh won the toss and elected to bat.

Match 17
13 October 2024
14:00 UTC+4
Scorecard

| Scotland; 109/6 (20 overs) | v | England; 113/0 (10 overs) |
| Kathryn Bryce 33 (28); Sophie Ecclestone 2/13 (4 overs) | | Maia Bouchier 62* (34) |

England won by 10 wickets
Sharjah Cricket Stadium, Sharjah
Umpires: Lauren Agenbag (SA) and Claire Polosak (Aus)
Player of the match: Maia Bouchier (Eng)

- Scotland won the toss and elected to bat.
- This was the first time England and Scotland faced each other in WT20Is.

Match 20
15 October 2024
18:00 UTC+4 (N)
Scorecard

| England; 141/7 (20 overs) | v | West Indies; 142/4 (18 overs) |
| Nat Sciver-Brunt 57* (50); Afy Fletcher 3/21 (4 overs) | | Qiana Joseph 52 (38); Sarah Glenn 1/20 (3 overs) |

West Indies won by 6 wickets
Dubai International Cricket Stadium, Dubai
Umpires: Sarah Dambanevana (Zim) and Eloise Sheridan (Aus)
Player of the match: Qiana Joseph (WI)

- West Indies won the toss and elected to field.
- Hayley Matthews (WI) played in her 100th WT20I match.
- West Indies qualified for their sixth T20 World Cup semi-final and South Africa qualified for their third consecutive and fourth overall T20 World Cup semi-final while England were eliminated as a result of this match.

== Knockout stage ==
The knockout stage consisted of two semi-finals played on 17 and 18 October, and the final on 20 October. The semi-final 1 and final were played at Dubai while the semi-final 2 was played at Sharjah. The group A winner and group B runner-up played in the first semi-final and group B winner and Group A runner-up in the second. If India had qualified, they would have played in the first semi-final. Both semi-finals and the final had a reserve day available on 18, 19, and 21 October, respectively. If a reserve day came into play, the match would not have been restarted but instead resumed from the previous day's play, if there was any; with the play commencing at 14:00 for semi-finals and 18:00 for the final (both UTC+04). In the event of no minimum play (at least 10 overs per side) on the scheduled day and the reserve day, in the semi-finals, the team that finished higher in the group stage would have progressed to the final, and in the final, the teams would have been declared as joint-winners.

=== Bracket ===
Semi-finals
A1 | Australia | 134/5 (20 overs)
B2 | South Africa | 135/2 (17.2 overs)
B1 | West Indies | 120/8 (20 overs)
A2 | New Zealand | 128/9 (20 overs)

Final
SF1W | South Africa | 126/9 (20 overs)
SF2W | New Zealand | 158/5 (20 overs)

=== Semi-finals ===
Semi-final 1
17 October 2024
18:00 UTC+4 (N)
Scorecard

| Australia; 134/5 (20 overs) | v | South Africa; 135/2 (17.2 overs) |
| Beth Mooney 44 (42); Ayabonga Khaka 2/24 (4 overs) | | Anneke Bosch 74* (48); Annabel Sutherland 2/26 (4 overs) |

South Africa won by 8 wickets
Dubai International Cricket Stadium, Dubai
Umpires: Nimali Perera (SL) and Jacqueline Williams (WI)
Player of the match: Anneke Bosch (SA)

- South Africa won the toss and elected to field.
- Beth Mooney (Aus) scored her 3,000th run in WT20Is.
- South Africa qualified for their second consecutive final.

Semi-final 2
18 October 2024
18:00 UTC+4 (N)
Scorecard

| New Zealand; 128/9 (20 overs) | v | West Indies; 120/8 (20 overs) |
| Georgia Plimmer 33 (31); Deandra Dottin 4/22 (4 overs) | | Deandra Dottin 33 (22); Eden Carson 3/29 (4 overs) |

New Zealand won by 8 runs
Sharjah Cricket Stadium, Sharjah
Umpires: Lauren Agenbag (SA) and Claire Polosak (Aus)
Player of the match: Eden Carson (NZ)

- New Zealand won the toss and elected to bat.
- New Zealand qualified for their third final.

=== Final ===
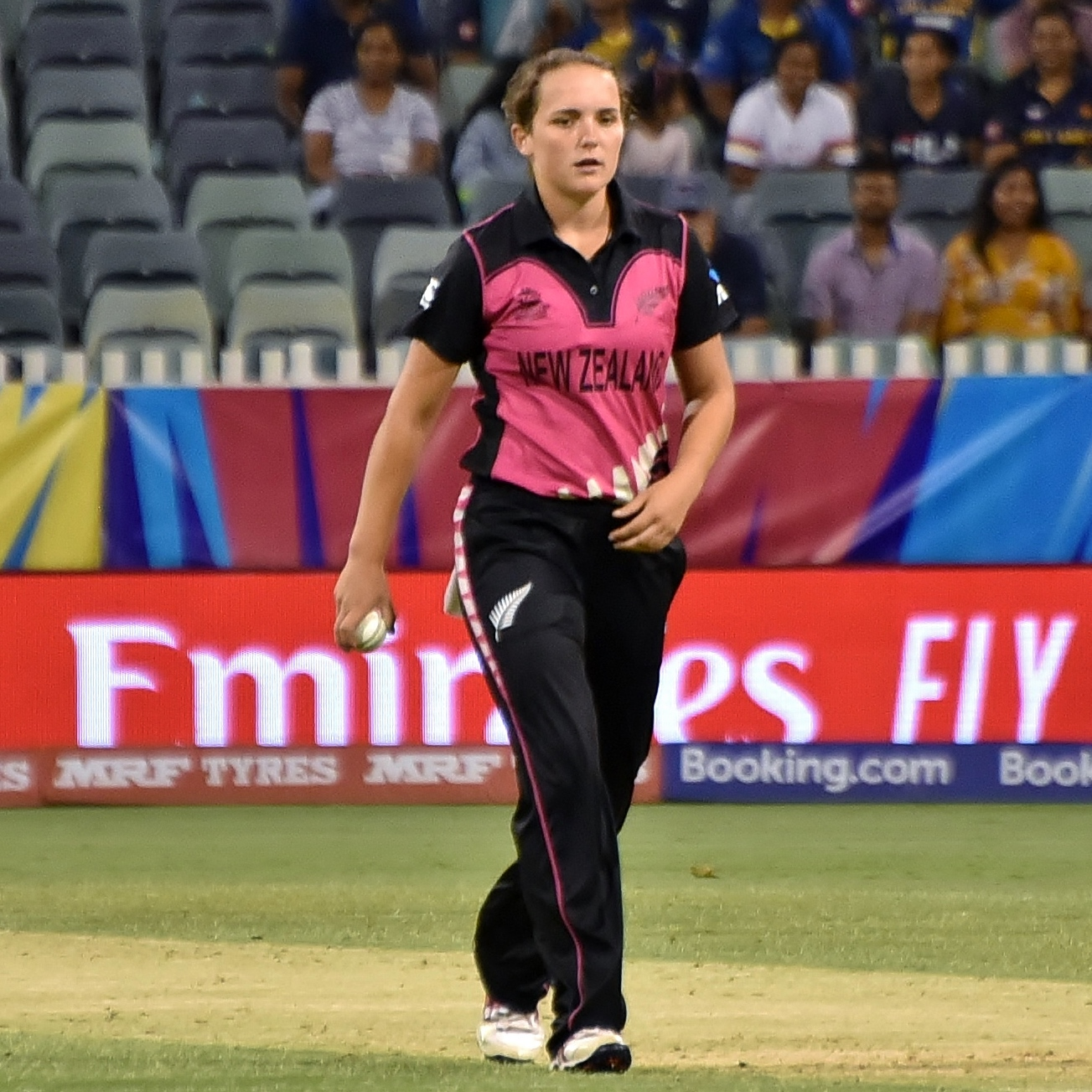
Amelia Kerr received the player of the match award in the final and the player of the tournament award.

South Africa won the toss and elected to field first. New Zealand batter Amelia Kerr was the only batter from her side to score 40+ with 43 runs; Brooke Halliday scored 38 runs, opener Suzie Bates scored 32 runs and Maddy Green scored 12 runs not out while two batters including captain Sophie Devine were dismissed for single-digit scores as New Zealand scored 158 runs for the loss of 5 wickets. Chasing the target, South African captain Laura Wolvaardt was the only batter from her side to score 20+ with 33 runs; Tazmin Brits scored 17 runs, Chloe Tryon scored 14 runs and Annerie Dercksen scored 10 runs while five other batters were dismissed for single-digit scores restricting South Africa to 126 runs for the loss of 9 wickets. Kerr and Rosemary Mair took three wickets each for New Zealand. This was New Zealand's maiden World Cup victory. Kerr received the player of the match award for the final as well as the player of the tournament award.

20 October 2024
Scorecard

| New Zealand; 158/5 (20 overs) | v | South Africa; 126/9 (20 overs) |

New Zealand won by 32 runs
Dubai International Cricket Stadium, Dubai

== Statistics ==
Laura Wolvaardt of South Africa scored the most runs in the 2024 tournament (223 runs) while Amelia Kerr of New Zealand took the most wickets in the 2024 tournament (15 wickets).

Most runs
| Runs | Player | Team |
|---|---|---|
| 223 | Laura Wolvaardt | South Africa |
| 187 | Tazmin Brits | South Africa |
| 151 | Danni Wyatt-Hodge | England |
| 150 | 3 players | |

Most wickets
| Wickets | Player | Team |
|---|---|---|
| 15 | Amelia Kerr | New Zealand |
| 12 | Nonkululeko Mlaba | South Africa |
| 10 | Afy Fletcher | West Indies |
| 10 | Rosemary Mair | New Zealand |
| 9 | 2 players | |

== Team of the tournament ==
On 21 October, the ICC announced its team of the tournament with Amelia Kerr being named as player of the tournament and Laura Wolvaardt as the captain of the team.

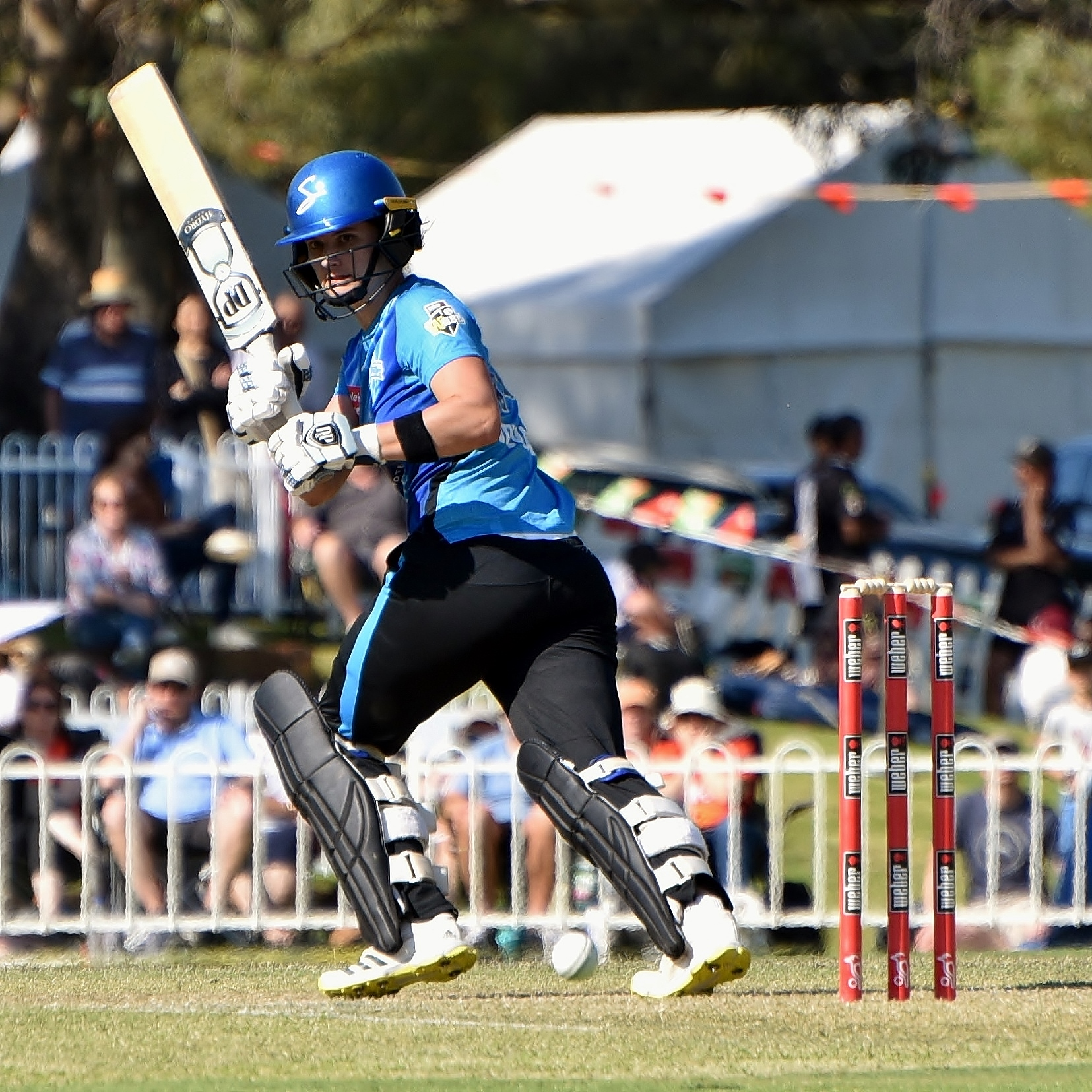
Laura Wolvaardt was named as the captain for the ICC's team of the tournament.

Team of the tournament
| Player | Team | Role |
|---|---|---|
| Laura Wolvaardt | South Africa | Batter / Captain |
| Tazmin Brits | South Africa | Batter |
| Danni Wyatt-Hodge | England | Batter |
| Amelia Kerr | New Zealand | All-rounder |
| Harmanpreet Kaur | India | Batter |
| Deandra Dottin | West Indies | All-rounder |
| Nigar Sultana | Bangladesh | Wicket-keeper |
| Afy Fletcher | West Indies | Bowler |
| Rosemary Mair | New Zealand | Bowler |
| Nonkululeko Mlaba | South Africa | Bowler |
| Megan Schutt | Australia | Bowler |
| Eden Carson | New Zealand | 12th player |

== Broadcasting ==
The global broadcasters for the tournament were confirmed by the ICC on 1 October 2024. The matches were also broadcast through ICC.tv for free to 116 territories.

Broadcasters for the tournament
| Region | Country/Sub-region | Broadcasting licensee(s) | Broadcasting platforms | Radio |
|---|---|---|---|---|
| Africa | Middle East and North Africa | E& | CricLife Max, StarzPlay & Ooredoo | —N/a |
| Africa | Sub-Saharan Africa | SuperSport | SS Cricket & DStv | —N/a |
| Americas | Canada | Willow | Willow TV & Cricbuzz | —N/a |
| Americas | Caribbean Islands | ESPN | ESPN Caribbean & ESPN Play & Disney+ | —N/a |
| Americas | United States | Willow | Willow TV & Cricbuzz | —N/a |
| Asia | Bangladesh | TSM | Nagorik TV & Toffee | —N/a |
| Asia | Hong Kong | PCCW | Astro Cricket | —N/a |
| Asia | India | Disney Star | Star Sports & Disney+ Hotstar | All India Radio |
| Asia | Malaysia | Astro | Astro Cricket & Sooka | —N/a |
| Asia | Pakistan | PTV; Ten Sports | PTV Sports & Myco; A Sports & Tamasha | —N/a |
| Asia | Singapore | StarHub | Hub Sports | —N/a |
| Asia | Sri Lanka | Maharaja TV | TV 1 | —N/a |
| Asia | United Arab Emirates | Channel 2/FunAsia Network | —N/a | Talk 100.3FM |
| Europe | Ireland | Sky Sports | Sky Sports Cricket | —N/a |
| Europe | United Kingdom | Sky Sports | Sky Sports Cricket & Sky Go | BBC Radio 5 Sports Extra |
| Oceania | Australia | Amazon | Prime Video | ABC Sport |
| Oceania | New Zealand | Sky TV NZ | Sky Sport & Sky Go | —N/a |
| Oceania | Papua New Guinea | PNG Digicel | TVWAN Sports & Digicel | —N/a |
| Rest of the world | | International Cricket Council | ICC.tv & t20worldcup.com | ICC app |

== See also ==
- International cricket in 2024–25
- Associate international cricket in 2024–25
- 2024 Men's T20 World Cup
- 2024 Men's T20 World Cup final
- 2024 Men's T20 World Cup qualification
- 2024 Men's T20 World Cup squads
- International cricket in 2024
- Associate international cricket in 2024
