= 2024 Women's Caribbean Premier League =

Third season of the Women's Caribbean Premier League

- Dates: 21 – 29 August 2024
- Administrator: Cricket West Indies
- Cricket format: Twenty20
- Tournament format(s): Double round-robin and final
- Host(s): Trinidad and Tobago
- Champions: Barbados Royals (2nd title)
- Runners-up: Trinbago Knight Riders
- Participants: 3
- Matches: 7
- Player of the series: Hayley Matthews (Barbados Royals)
- Most runs: Erin Burns (Guyana Amazon Warriors) (172)
- Most wickets: Hayley Matthews (Barbados Royals) (11)
- Official website: cplt20.com

The 2024 Women's Caribbean Premier League, known for sponsorship reasons as the Massy WCPL 2024, was the third edition of the Women's Caribbean Premier League, a domestic Twenty20 women's cricket tournament that took place in the West Indies. The tournament ran from 21 to 29 August 2024, with all matches played at the Brian Lara Cricket Academy in San Fernando in Trinidad. Barbados Royals were the defending champions.

The tournament was won by Barbados Royals defeating Trinbago Knight Riders by 4 wickets in the final to win their second consecutive title.

== Format ==
The three teams that competed in the 2023 season return for a third year and will play both the other teams twice, therefore playing four matches apiece. This will be a repeat of the group stage matches from the previous season. Matches will be played using a Twenty20 format. The top two teams in the group will advance to the final.

The league is working with a points system with positions being based on the total points. Points will be awarded as follows:

Win: 2 points.
Abandoned/No Result: 1 point.
Loss: 0 points.

== Squads ==
The following players were retained or signed by their respective teams for the tournament and the players draft was held on July 16, 2024.

| Barbados Royals | Guyana Amazon Warriors | Trinbago Knight Riders |
|---|---|---|
| Hayley Matthews; Chinelle Henry; Afy Fletcher; Aaliyah Alleyne; Rashada Williams; Shabika Gajnabi; Cherry-Ann Fraser; Trishan Holder; Qiana Joseph; Djenaba Joseph; Naijanni Cumberbatch; Chamari Athapaththu; Amanda-Jade Wellington; Laura Harris; Georgia Redmayne | Stafanie Taylor; Shemaine Campbelle; Natasha McLean; Karishma Ramharack; Shakera Selman; Sheneta Grimmond; Ashmini Munisar; Kate Wilmott; Kaysia Schultz; Nyia Latchman; Realeanna Grimmond; Shabnim Ismail; Erin Burns; Chloe Tryon; Lauren Winfield-Hill | Deandra Dottin; Chedean Nation; Kycia Knight; Shamilia Connell; Kyshona Knight; Jahzara Claxton; Zaida James; Jannillea Glasgow; Anisa Mohammed; Shunelle Shaw; Samara Ramnath; ~~Meg Lanning~~; Jess Jonassen; Jemimah Rodrigues; Shikha Pandey; Harshitha Samarawickrama |

On 22 August 2024, Meg Lanning was ruled out of the tournament due to injury. Harshitha Samarawickrama was named as her replacement.

== Points table ==
| Pos | Team | Pld | W | L | Pts | NRR | Qualification |
|---|---|---|---|---|---|---|---|
| 1 | Barbados Royals | 4 | 3 | 1 | 6 | 0.454 | Advanced to the final |
| 2 | Trinbago Knight Riders | 4 | 2 | 2 | 4 | −0.518 | Advanced to the final |
| 3 | Guyana Amazon Warriors | 4 | 1 | 3 | 2 | 0.013 | |

Source: ESPNcricinfo

=== Match summary ===
| Team | Group matches | | | | Play-offs |
| Team | 1 | 2 | 3 | 4 | Final |
|---|---|---|---|---|---|
| Barbados Royals | 2 | 4 | 6 | 6 | W |
| Guyana Amazon Warriors | 0 | 2 | 2 | 2 | — |
| Trinbago Knight Riders | 0 | 0 | 2 | 4 | L |

| Win | Loss | Tie | No result | Eliminated |

- Note: The total points at the end of each group match are listed.
- Note: Click on the points or results to see the match summary.

== Fixtures ==
The full schedule of the tournament was announced on 20 May 2024.

=== League stage ===
Match 1
21 August 2024
19:00 (N)
Scorecard

| Guyana Amazon Warriors; 118/9 (20 overs) | v | Barbados Royals; 119/9 (19.5 overs) |
| Stafanie Taylor 38 (36); Aaliyah Alleyne 3/21 (4 overs) | | Hayley Matthews 61* (58); Shabnim Ismail 4/16 (4 overs) |

Barbados Royals won by 1 wicket
Brian Lara Cricket Academy, San Fernando
Umpires: Gregory Brathwaite (WI) and Jacqueline Williams (WI)
Player of the match: Hayley Matthews (Barbados Royals)

- Barbados Royals won the toss and elected to field.

Match 2
22 August 2024
19:00 (N)
Scorecard

| Trinbago Knight Riders; 113/9 (20 overs) | v | Barbados Royals; 116/3 (17.1 overs) |
| Shikha Pandey 30 (34); Amanda-Jade Wellington 2/14 (4 overs) | | Hayley Matthews 67* (56); Jess Jonassen 2/21 (4 overs) |

Barbados Royals won by 7 wickets
Brian Lara Cricket Academy, San Fernando
Umpires: Patrick Gustard (WI) and Leslie Reifer (WI)
Player of the match: Hayley Matthews (Barbados Royals)

- Barbados Royals won the toss and elected to field.

Match 3
23 August 2024
20:00 (N)
Scorecard

| Trinbago Knight Riders; 130/6 (20 overs) | v | Guyana Amazon Warriors; 134/2 (17.2 overs) |
| Harshitha Samarawickrama 33 (28); Chloe Tryon 4/21 (4 overs) | | Erin Burns 78* (48); Jess Jonassen 1/13 (3 overs) |

Guyana Amazon Warriors won by 8 wickets
Brian Lara Cricket Academy, San Fernando
Umpires: Nigel Duguid (WI) and Leslie Reifer (WI)
Player of the match: Erin Burns (Guyana Amazon Warriors)

- Guyana Amazon Warriors won the toss and elected to field.

Match 4
25 August 2024
20:00 (N)
Scorecard

| Trinbago Knight Riders; 128/8 (20 overs) | v | Guyana Amazon Warriors; 128/5 (20 overs) |
| Deandra Dottin 53 (38); Chloe Tryon 2/12 (4 overs) | | Erin Burns 61 (50); Zaida James 1/24 (4 overs) |

Match tied (Trinbago Knight Riders won the Super Over)
Brian Lara Cricket Academy, San Fernando
Umpires: Patrick Gustard (WI) and Jacqueline Williams (WI)
Player of the match: Deandra Dottin (Trinbago Knight Riders)

- Guyana Amazon Warriors won the toss and elected to field.
- Super Over: Trinbago Knight Riders 19/0, Guyana Amazon Warriors 4/2.

Match 5
26 August 2024
19:00 (N)
Scorecard

| Barbados Royals; 101/8 (20 overs) | v | Guyana Amazon Warriors; 84/9 (20 overs) |
| Qiana Joseph 19 (26); Erin Burns 3/31 (4 overs) | | Natasha McLean 20 (23); Hayley Matthews 4/14 (4 overs) |

Barbados Royals won by 17 runs
Brian Lara Cricket Academy, San Fernando
Umpires: Nigel Duguid (WI) and Jacqueline Williams (WI)
Player of the match: Qiana Joseph (Barbados Royals)

- Guyana Amazon Warriors won the toss and elected to field.

Match 6
27 August 2024
20:00 (N)
Scorecard

| Barbados Royals; 130/7 (20 overs) | v | Trinbago Knight Riders; 131/6 (19.4 overs) |
| Chamari Athapaththu 70 (63); Samara Ramnath 2/20 (4 overs) | | Jemimah Rodrigues 59* (50); Chamari Athapaththu 2/24 (4 overs) |

Trinbago Knight Riders won by 4 wickets
Brian Lara Cricket Academy, San Fernando
Umpires: Zahid Bassarath (WI) and Jacqueline Williams (WI)
Player of the match: Jemimah Rodrigues (Trinbago Knight Riders)

- Trinbago Knight Riders won the toss and elected to field.

== Final ==
29 August 2024
15:00
Scorecard

| Trinbago Knight Riders; 93/8 (20 overs) | v | Barbados Royals; 94/6 (15 overs) |
| Shikha Pandey 28 (31); Aaliyah Alleyne 4/21 (4 overs) | | Chamari Athapaththu 39* (47); Samara Ramnath 2/18 (4 overs) |

Barbados Royals won by 4 wickets
Brian Lara Cricket Academy, San Fernando
Umpires: Gregory Brathwaite (WI) and Jacqueline Williams (WI)
Player of the match: Aaliyah Alleyne (Barbados Royals)

- Barbados Royals won the toss and elected to field.

== Statistics ==
=== Most runs ===
| Runs | Player | Team | Mat | Inns | HS |
|---|---|---|---|---|---|
| 172 | Erin Burns | Guyana Amazon Warriors | 4 | 4 | 78* |
| 147 | Hayley Matthews | Barbados Royals | 5 | 5 | 67* |
| 129 | Chamari Athapaththu | Barbados Royals | 4 | 4 | 70 |
| 119 | Deandra Dottin | Trinbago Knight Riders | 5 | 5 | 53 |
| 105 | Jemimah Rodrigues | Trinbago Knight Riders | 5 | 5 | 59* |

- Source: ESPNcricinfo

=== Most wickets ===
| Wickets | Player | Team | Innings | Best bowling |
|---|---|---|---|---|
| 11 | Hayley Matthews | Barbados Royals | 5 | 4/14 |
| 9 | Aaliyah Alleyne | Barbados Royals | 5 | 4/21 |
| 9 | Shabnim Ismail | Guyana Amazon Warriors | 4 | 4/16 |
| 8 | Chloe Tryon | Guyana Amazon Warriors | 4 | /21 |
| 6 | Qiana Joseph | Barbados Royals | 4 | 3/16 |

- Source: ESPNcricinfo
