= 2026 Women's Caribbean Premier League =

Fifth season of the Women's Caribbean Premier League

- Dates: 5 – 17 September 2026
- Administrator: Cricket West Indies
- Cricket format: Twenty20
- Tournament format(s): Single round-robin and knockout
- Host: Barbados
- Champions: Guyana Amazon Warriors (1st title)
- Runners-up: Trinbago Knight Riders
- Participants: 4
- Matches: 8
- Most runs: Shemaine Campbelle (GAW) (154)
- Most wickets: Shikha Pandey (TKR) (7); Deandra Dottin (TKR) (7); Shabnim Ismail (GAW) (7)
- Official website: cplt20.com

The 2026 Women's Caribbean Premier League, also known as Limacol WCPL 2026 for sponsorship reasons, was the fifth edition of the Women's Caribbean Premier League, a domestic Twenty20 women's cricket tournament that is played in the West Indies. The tournament began on 5 September and the final was played on 17 September 2026, with all matches played at the Kensington Oval in Barbados. Barbados Tridents (previously known as Barbados Royals) were the defending champions.

In the final, Guyana Amazon Warriors defeated Trinbago Knight Riders by 2 wickets to win their maiden title.

== Format ==
The three teams that competed in the 2025 season return for a fifth year with the addition of a new franchise, Jamaica Empress and will play each other once, therefore playing three matches apiece. Matches will be played using a Twenty20 format. The table topper team in the group will advance to the final while the second and third placed team will advance to the playoff to determine the second finalist.

== Squads ==
The following players were drafted or signed by their respective teams for the tournament.

Barbados Tridents	Guyana Amazon Warriors	Jamaica Empress	Trinbago Knight Riders
Hayley Matthews (c); Qiana Joseph; Afy Fletcher; Shawnisha Hector; Shabika Gajnabi; Mandy Mangru; Cherry-Ann Fraser; Naijanni Cumberbatch; Asabi Callender; Amrita Ramtahal; Harleen Deol; Maddy Green; Suzie Bates; Pooja Vastrakar; Kiran Navgire	Chloe Tryon (c); Shemaine Campbelle; Realeanna Grimmond; Ashmini Munisar; Shamilia Connell; Eboni Brathwaite; Sheneta Grimmond; Chedean Nation; Reniece Boyce; Latoya Williams; Tilleya Madramootoo; Shabnim Ismail; Erin Burns; Tazmin Brits; Nadine de Klerk	Stafanie Taylor (c); Chinelle Henry; Aaliyah Alleyne; Rashada Williams; Zaida James; Djenaba Joseph; Kate Wilmott; Celina Whyte; Abigail Bryce; Shriya Jairam; Meg Lanning; Amy Hunter; Nonkululeko Mlaba; Syeda Aroob Shah; Rosemary Mair	Deandra Dottin (c); Karishma Ramharack; Jahzara Claxton; Jannillea Glasgow; Steffi Soogrim; Earnisha Fontaine; Samara Ramnath; Amelia Khan; Brianna Harricharan; Sainavi Kambapalli; Marizanne Kapp; Shikha Pandey; Laura Harris; Madeline Penna; Yastika Bhatia

== Standings ==
=== Points table ===
Pos	Team	Pld	W	L	NR	Pts	NRR	Qualification
1	Trinbago Knight Riders (R)	3	2	1	0	4	1.016	Advanced to the Final
2	Guyana Amazon Warriors (C)	3	2	1	0	4	0.475	Advanced to the Playoff
3	Barbados Tridents (H)	3	1	2	0	2	−0.444	Advanced to the Playoff
4	Jamaica Empress	3	1	2	0	2	−1.153	Eliminated

Source: Cricinfo
(C) Champions; (H) Host; (R) Runners-up

=== Match summary ===
Team	Group matches			Playoffs	
Team	1	2	3	P	F
Barbados Tridents	0	2	2	L	
Guyana Amazon Warriors	0	2	4	W	W
Jamaica Empress	2	2	2		
Trinbago Knight Riders	2	4	4		L

Win	Loss	No result

- Note: The total points at the end of each group match are listed.
- Note: Click on the points (group matches) or W/L (playoffs) to see the match summary.

Visitor team →	BT	GAW	JE	TKR
Home team ↓	BT	GAW	JE	TKR
Barbados Tridents			Barbados; 3 runs	Trinbago; 21 runs
Guyana Amazon Warriors	Guyana; 5 wickets			
Jamaica Empress		Jamaica; 1 wicket (DLS)		
Trinbago Knight Riders		Guyana; 25 runs	Trinbago; 9 wickets	

Home team won	Visitor team won

- Note: Results listed are according to the home (horizontal) and visitor (vertical) teams.
- Note: Click on a result to see a summary of the match.

== League stage ==
Match 1
5 September 2026
15:00 (D/N)
Scorecard

Trinbago Knight Riders; 155 (20 overs)	v	Barbados Tridents (H); 134 (18.4 overs)
Laura Harris 38 (19); Qiana Joseph 3/27 (4 overs)		Kiran Navgire 28 (21); Shikha Pandey 3/17 (3.4 overs)

Trinbago Knight Riders won by 21 runs
Kensington Oval, Bridgetown
Umpires: Candace la Borde (WI) and Jacqueline Williams (WI)
Player of the match: Shikha Pandey (Trinbago Knight Riders)

- Barbados Tridents won the toss and elected to field.

Match 2
6 September 2026
10:00
Scorecard

Guyana Amazon Warriors; 138/7 (20 overs)	v	Jamaica Empress; 136/9 (19 overs)
Shemaine Campbelle 56 (33); Nonkululeko Mlaba 2/15 (4 overs)		Chinelle Henry 41* (21); Erin Burns 2/3 (2 overs)

Jamaica Empress won by 1 wicket (DLS method)
Kensington Oval, Bridgetown
Umpires: Zahid Bassarath (WI) and Candace la Borde (WI)
Player of the match: Chinelle Henry (Jamaica Empress)

- Jamaica Empress won the toss and elected to field.
- Jamaica Empress were set a revised of 132 runs off 19 overs due to rain.

Match 3
10 September 2026
10:00
Scorecard

Jamaica Empress; 100/8 (20 overs)	v	Trinbago Knight Riders; 104/1 (11.1 overs)
Rashada Williams 40 (47); Karishma Ramharack 3/11 (3 overs)		Yastika Bhatia 57* (34); Nonkululeko Mlaba 1/34 (3 overs)

Trinbago Knight Riders won by 9 wickets
Kensington Oval, Bridgetown
Umpires: Gregory Brathwaite (WI) and Jacqueline Williams (WI)
Player of the match: Karishma Ramharack (Trinbago Knight Riders)

- Trinbago Knight Riders won the toss and elected to field.

Match 4
12 September 2026
10:00
Scorecard

Guyana Amazon Warriors; 119/8 (20 overs)	v	Trinbago Knight Riders; 94/9 (20 overs)
Shemaine Campbelle 31 (28); Shikha Pandey 2/9 (4 overs)		Madeline Penna 28 (22); Shabnim Ismail 3/21 (4 overs)

Guyana Amazon Warriors won by 25 runs
Kensington Oval, Bridgetown
Umpires: Zahid Bassarath (WI) and Candace la Borde (WI)
Player of the match: Shabnim Ismail (Guyana Amazon Warriors)

- Trinbago Knight Riders won the toss and elected to field.

Match 5
12 September 2026
15:00 (D/N)
Scorecard

Barbados Tridents (H); 140/7 (20 overs)	v	Jamaica Empress; 137/4 (20 overs)
Suzie Bates 39* (28); Stafanie Taylor 4/29 (4 overs)		Meg Lanning 57 (46); Cherry-Ann Fraser 1/13 (2 overs)

Barbados Tridents won by 3 runs
Kensington Oval, Bridgetown
Umpires: Jacqueline Williams (WI) and Chris Wright (WI)
Player of the match: Suzie Bates (Barbados Tridents)

- Barbados Tridents won the toss and elected to bat.

Match 6
13 September 2026
14:00
Scorecard

Barbados Tridents (H); 158/7 (20 overs)	v	Guyana Amazon Warriors; 159/5 (19 overs)
Hayley Matthews 50 (37); Sheneta Grimmond 3/28 (4 overs)		Tazmin Brits 46 (41); Afy Fletcher 2/23 (4 overs)

Guyana Amazon Warriors won by 5 wickets
Kensington Oval, Bridgetown
Umpires: Candace la Borde (WI) and Carl Tuckett (WI)
Player of the match: Tazmin Brits (Guyana Amazon Warriors)

- Guyana Amazon Warriors won the toss and elected to field.

== Knockout stage ==
=== Bracket ===
Playoff			Final
			1	Trinbago Knight Riders	145/6 (20 overs)
2	Guyana Amazon Warriors	75/3 (7.2 overs)	PW	Guyana Amazon Warriors	149/8 (19.3 overs)
3	Barbados Tridents	69/4 (8 overs)

=== Playoff ===
Playoff
16 September 2026
10:00
Scorecard

Barbados Tridents; 69/4 (8 overs)	v	Guyana Amazon Warriors; 75/3 (7.2 overs)
Maddy Green 30* (16); Erin Burns 1/11 (2 overs)		Tazmin Brits 35* (23); Shawnisha Hector 1/6 (1 over)

Guyana Amazon Warriors won by 7 wickets
Kensington Oval, Bridgetown
Umpires: Candace la Borde (WI) and Jacqueline Williams (WI)
Player of the match: Tazmin Brits (Guyana Amazon Warriors)

- Guyana Amazon Warriors won the toss and elected to field.
- The match was reduced to 8 overs per side due to rain.

=== Final ===
Final
17 September 2026
14:00
Scorecard

Trinbago Knight Riders; 145/6 (20 overs)	v	Guyana Amazon Warriors; 149/8 (19.3 overs)
Sushma Verma 39 (34); Shabnim Ismail 2/18 (4 overs)		Chedean Nation 39* (21); Deandra Dottin 2/19 (4 overs)

Guyana Amazon Warriors won by 2 wickets
Kensington Oval, Bridgetown
Umpires: Candace la Borde (WI) and Jacqueline Williams (WI)
Player of the match: Chedean Nation (Guyana Amazon Warriors)

- Trinbago Knight Riders won the toss and elected to bat.

== Statistics ==
=== Most runs ===
Runs	Player	Team	Inns.	SR	Avg.	HS
154	Shemaine Campbelle	Guyana Amazon Warriors	5	132.75	30.80	56
119	Tazmin Brits	Guyana Amazon Warriors	5	100.84	29.75	46
112	Hayley Matthews	Barbados Tridents	4	128.73	28.00	50
107	Maddy Green	Barbados Tridents	4	135.44	35.66	39
98	Yastika Bhatia	Trinbago Knight Riders	3	138.02	49.00	57*
Source: Cricinfo

=== Most wickets ===
Wickets	Player	Team	Inns.	Econ.	BBI
7	Shikha Pandey	Trinbago Knight Riders	4	5.17	3/17
7	Deandra Dottin	Trinbago Knight Riders	4	5.87	2/19
7	Shabnim Ismail	Guyana Amazon Warriors	5	6.11	3/21
6	Karishma Ramharack	Trinbago Knight Riders	4	6.19	3/11
6	Stafanie Taylor	Jamaica Empress	3	7.27	4/29
6	Qiana Joseph	Barbados Tridents	4	7.33	3/27
Source: Cricinfo
