= 2024 Women's Caribbean Premier League final =

Final match of 2024 WCPL

2024 Women's Caribbean Premier League Final
- Event: 2024 Women's Caribbean Premier League
Barbados Royals	(Trinidad and Tobago) Trinbago Knight Riders
94/6	93/8
15 overs	20 overs
- Barbados Royals won by 4 wickets
- Date: 29 August 2024
- Venue: Brian Lara Cricket Academy, San Fernando
- Player of the match: Aaliyah Alleyne (Barbados Royals)
- Umpires: Gregory Brathwaite; Jacqueline Williams

The 2024 Women's Caribbean Premier League final was a Women's Twenty20 cricket match played at the Brian Lara Cricket Academy in San Fernando, Trinidad and Tobago on 29 August 2024 to determine the winner of the 2024 Women's Caribbean Premier League.

Barbados Royals won their 2nd consecutive tournament by defeating Trinbago Knight Riders by 4 wickets in the final.

== Background ==
The full schedule of the tournament was announced on 20 May 2024. Defending champions Barbados Royals reached their third consecutive final after topping the group stage, winning 3 out of 4 matches. Trinbago Knight Riders reached their second final, after having previously won the 2022 tournament.

== Match ==
=== Match officials ===
- On-field umpires: Gregory Brathwaite (WI) and Jacqueline Williams (WI)
- Third umpire: Zahid Bassarath (WI)
- Reserve umpire: Leslie Reifer (WI)
- Match referee: Michael Ragoonath (WI)
- Toss: Barbados Royals won the toss and elected to field.

=== Summary ===
29 August 2024
15:00
Scorecard

Trinbago Knight Riders; 93/8 (20 overs)	v	Barbados Royals; 94/6 (15 overs)
Shikha Pandey 28 (31); Aaliyah Alleyne 4/21 (4 overs)		Chamari Athapaththu 39* (47); Samara Ramnath 2/18 (4 overs)

Barbados Royals won by 4 wickets
Brian Lara Cricket Academy, San Fernando
Umpires: Gregory Brathwaite (WI) and Jacqueline Williams (WI)
Player of the match: Aaliyah Alleyne (Barbados Royals)

- Barbados Royals won the toss and elected to field.
