= 2025 Women's Caribbean Premier League =

Fourth season of the Women's Caribbean Premier League

- Dates: 6 – 17 September 2025
- Administrator: Cricket West Indies
- Cricket format: Twenty20
- Tournament format(s): Double round-robin and final
- Host: Guyana
- Champions: Barbados Royals (3rd title)
- Runners-up: Guyana Amazon Warriors
- Participants: 3
- Matches: 7
- Player of the series: Chamari Athapaththu (Barbados Royals)
- Most runs: Chamari Athapaththu (Barbados Royals) (194)
- Most wickets: Laura Harris (Guyana Amazon Warriors) (8); Ashmini Munisar (Guyana Amazon Warriors) (8)
- Official website: cplt20.com

The 2025 Women's Caribbean Premier League, known for sponsorship reasons as the Massy WCPL 2025, was the fourth edition of the Women's Caribbean Premier League, a domestic Twenty20 women's cricket tournament that took place in the West Indies. The tournament was held from 6 to 17 September 2025, with all matches played at the Providence Stadium in Guyana. Barbados Royals were the defending champions.

In the final, Barbados Royals defeated Guyana Amazon Warriors by 3 wickets to win their 3rd consecutive title.

== Format ==
The three teams that competed in the 2024 season return for a fourth year and will play both the other sides twice, therefore playing four matches apiece. This will be a repeat of the group stage matches from the previous season. Matches will be played using a Twenty20 format. The top two teams in the group will advance to the final.

The league is working with a points system with positions being based on the total points. Points will be awarded as follows:

Win: 2 points.
Abandoned/No Result: 1 point.
Loss: 0 points.

== Venue ==
All matches were held at the Providence Stadium.

Host: Guyana
Providence Stadium
Capacity: 15,000
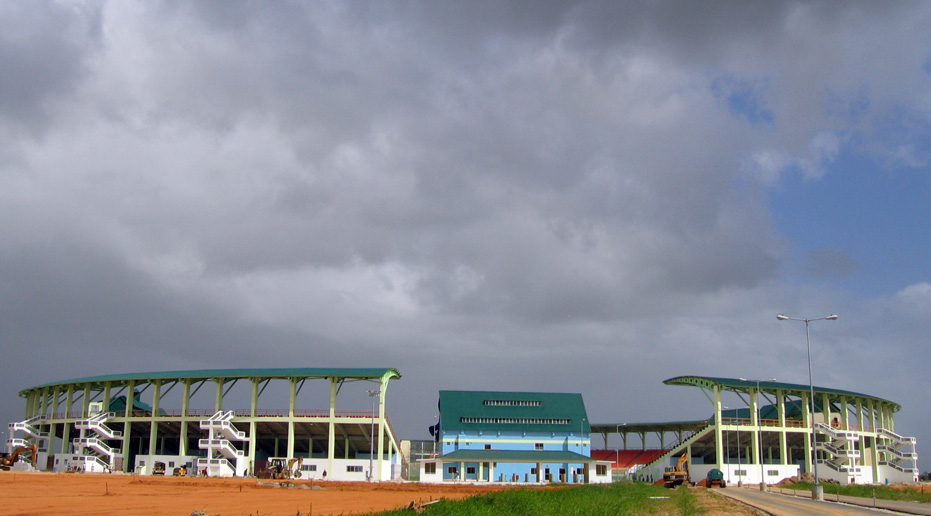

== Squads ==
The following players were retained or signed by their respective teams for the tournament and the players draft was held on June 23, 2025.

Barbados Royals	Guyana Amazon Warriors	Trinbago Knight Riders
Chamari Athapaththu; Georgia Redmayne; Courtney Webb; Shreyanka Patil; Hayley Matthews; Chinelle Henry; Afy Fletcher; Aaliyah Alleyne; Qiana Joseph; Steffie Soogrim; Shamilia Connell; Sheneta Grimmond; Kycia Knight; Trishan Holder; Naijanni Cumberbatch	Shabnim Ismail; Lauren Winfield-Hill; Laura Harris; Madeline Penna; Stafanie Taylor; Ashmini Munisar; Cherry-Ann Fraser; Chedean Nation; Plaffiana Millington; Kaysia Schultz; Shemaine Campbelle; Karishma Ramharack; Nyia Latchman; Britney Cooper; Realeanna Grimmond	Shikha Pandey; Salonee Dangore; Jess Jonassen; Lizelle Lee; Deandra Dottin; Shabika Gajnabi; Shawnisha Hector; Rashada Williams; Nerissa Crafton; Jahzara Claxton; Zaida James; Jannillea Glasgow; Keila Elliott; Abigail Bryce; Samara Ramnath

== Points table ==
Pos	Team	Pld	W	L	Pts	NRR	Qualification
1	Barbados Royals	4	4	0	8	0.999	Advanced to the final
2	Guyana Amazon Warriors	4	2	2	4	0.057	Advanced to the final
3	Trinbago Knight Riders	4	0	4	0	−1.023	

Source: ESPNCricinfo

=== Match summary ===
Team	Group matches				Play-offs
Team	1	2	3	4	Final
Barbados Royals	2	4	6	8	W
Guyana Amazon Warriors	2	2	4	4	L
Trinbago Knight Riders	0	0	0	0	—

Win	Loss	Tie	No result	Eliminated

- Note: The total points at the end of each group match are listed.
- Note: Click on the points or results to see the match summary.

== Fixtures ==
The full schedule of the tournament was announced on 12 June 2025.

=== League stage ===
Match 1
6 September 2025
14:00
Scorecard

Guyana Amazon Warriors; 129/7 (20 overs)	v	Trinbago Knight Riders; 123/9 (20 overs)
Stafanie Taylor 45 (37); Jess Jonassen 2/18 (4 overs)		Lizelle Lee 36 (32); Ashmini Munisar 3/21 (4 overs)

Guyana Amazon Warriors won by 6 runs
Providence Stadium, Guyana
Umpires: Zahid Bassarath and Chris Wright
Player of the match: Laura Harris (Guyana Amazon Warriors)

- Trinbago Knight Riders won the toss and elected to field.

Match 2
7 September 2025
15:00
Scorecard

Guyana Amazon Warriors; 154/4 (20 overs)	v	Barbados Royals; 140/3 (17.2 overs)
Realeanna Grimmond 61* (57); Aaliyah Alleyne 2/27 (3 overs)		Chinelle Henry 37* (19); Ashmini Munisar 2/24 (4 overs)

Barbados Royals won by 7 (DLS method)
Providence Stadium, Guyana
Umpires: Zahid Bassarath and Carl Tuckett
Player of the match: Chinelle Henry (Barbados Royals)

- Guyana Amazon Warriors won the toss and elected to bat.
- Barbados Royals were set a revised target of 137 runs from 18 overs due to rain.

Match 3
10 September 2025
14:00
Scorecard

Barbados Royals; 137/6 (20 overs)	v	Trinbago Knight Riders; 78 (15.3 overs)
Qiana Joseph 63 (52); Deandra Dottin 2/22 (4 overs)		Lizelle Lee 39* (44); Chamari Athapaththu 4/7 (3 overs)

Barbados Royals won by 59 runs
Providence Stadium, Guyana
Umpires: Carl Tuckett and Chris Wright
Player of the match: Chamari Athapaththu (Barbados Royals)

- Barbados Royals won the toss and elected to bat.

Match 4
13 September 2025
16:00
Scorecard

Trinbago Knight Riders; 123/7 (20 overs)	v	Guyana Amazon Warriors; 125/5 (18.5 overs)
Jess Jonassen 51 (45); Molly Penfold 4/17 (4 overs)		Stafanie Taylor 39 (44); Shikha Pandey 2/23 (3.5 overs)

Guyana Amazon Warriors won by 5 wickets
Providence Stadium, Guyana
Umpires: Zahid Bassarath and Leslie Reifer
Player of the match: Stafanie Taylor (Guyana Amazon Warriors)

- Trinbago Knight Riders won the toss an elected to bat.

Match 5
14 September 2025
14:00
Scorecard

Barbados Royals; 132/6 (20 overs)	v	Guyana Amazon Warriors; 129/8 (20 overs)
Chinelle Henry 46* (34); Laura Harris 3/28 (4 overs)		Amy Hunter 63 (50); Chamari Athapaththu 3/25 (4 overs)

Barbados Royals won by 3 runs
Providence Stadium, Guyana
Umpires: Carl Tuckett and Chris Wright
Player of the match: Chamari Athapaththu (Barbados Royals)

- Guyana Amazon Warriors won the toss and elected to field.

Match 6
16 September 2025
15:00
Scorecard

Trinbago Knight Riders; 148/8 (20 overs)	v	Barbados Royals; 149/3 (19.1 overs)
Jess Jonassen 71 (52); Chinelle Henry 3/25 (4 overs)		Chamari Athapaththu 89 (71); Shikha Pandey 2/19 (3.1 overs)

Barbados Royals won by 7 wickets
Providence Stadium, Guyana
Umpires: Zahid Bassarath and Leslie Reifer
Player of the match: Chamari Athapaththu (Barbados ROyals)

- Trinbago Knight Riders won the toss and elected to bat.

== Final ==
Final
17 September 2025
14:00
Scorecard

Guyana Amazon Warriors; 136/3 (20 overs)	v	Barbados Royals; 137/7 (19.4 overs)
Amy Hunter 29 (36); Shamilia Connell 1/20 (4 overs)		Courtney Webb 31 (27); Ashmini Munisar 3/21 (4 overs)

Barbados Royals won by 3 wickets
Providence Stadium, Guyana
Umpires: Leslie Reifer and Carl Tuckett
Player of the match: Aaliyah Alleyne (Barbados Royals)

- Barbados Royals won the toss and elected to field.
