= 2023 Women's Caribbean Premier League =

Second season of the Women's Caribbean Premier League

- Dates: 31 August – 10 September 2023
- Administrator: Cricket West Indies
- Cricket format: Twenty20
- Tournament format(s): Double round-robin and final
- Hosts: Barbados; Trinidad and Tobago
- Champions: Barbados Royals (1st title)
- Runners-up: Guyana Amazon Warriors
- Participants: 3
- Matches: 7
- Player of the series: Sophie Devine (Guyana Amazon Warriors)
- Most runs: Sophie Devine (Guyana Amazon Warriors) (253)
- Most wickets: Shreyanka Patil (Guyana Amazon Warriors) (9)
- Official website: cplt20.com

The 2023 Women's Caribbean Premier League, known for sponsorship reasons as the Massy WCPL 2023, was the second edition of the Women's Caribbean Premier League, a domestic Twenty20 women's cricket tournament played in the West Indies. The tournament took place from 31 August to 10 September 2023, with matches played in Barbados and Trinidad. Trinbago Knight Riders were the defending champions.

Barbados Royals won the tournament, beating Guyana Amazon Warriors in the final.

== Competition format ==
The three teams played each other side twice, therefore playing four matches apiece. This represented a doubling of group stage matches from the previous season. Matches were played using a Twenty20 format. The top two teams in the group advanced to the final.

The league worked on a points system with positions being based on the total points. Points were awarded as follows:

Win: 2 points.
Tie: 1 point.
Loss: 0 points.
Abandoned/No Result: 1 point.

== Squads ==
Source: CPL T20

Barbados Royals	Guyana Amazon Warriors	Trinbago Knight Riders
Hayley Matthews (c); Aaliyah Alleyne; Jahzara Claxton; Afy Fletcher; Jannillea Glasgow; Laura Harris; Chinelle Henry; Trishan Holder; Qiana Joseph; Marizanne Kapp; Gaby Lewis; Chedean Nation; Vanessa Watts; Amanda-Jade Wellington; Rashada Williams	Stafanie Taylor (c); Suzie Bates; Shemaine Campbelle; Sophie Devine; Cherry-Ann Fraser; Shabika Gajnabi; Sheneta Grimmond; Shabnim Ismail; Djenaba Joseph; Natasha McLean; Ashmini Munisar; Shreyanka Patil; Karishma Ramharack; Kaysia Schultz; Shakera Selman	Deandra Dottin (c); Shamilia Connell; Britney Cooper; Mignon du Preez; Zaida James; Fran Jonas; Marie Kelly; Lee-Ann Kirby; Kycia Knight; Kyshona Knight; Anisa Mohammed; Carena Noel; Orla Prendergast; Samara Ramnath; Shunelle Sawh; ~~Dane van Niekerk~~

== Points table ==
Pos	Team	Pld	W	L	Pts	NRR	Qualification
1	Barbados Royals	4	3	1	6	0.977	Advanced to the final
2	Guyana Amazon Warriors	4	2	2	4	1.417	Advanced to the final
3	Trinbago Knight Riders	4	1	3	2	−2.294	

Source: Cricinfo, Cricbuzz

=== Match summary ===
Team	Group matches				Play-offs
Team	1	2	3	4	Final
Barbados Royals	2	4	6	6	W
Guyana Amazon Warriors	0	0	2	4	L
Trinbago Knight Riders	0	0	2	2	—

Win	Loss	Tie	No result	Eliminated

- Note: The total points at the end of each group match are listed.
- Note: Click on the points or results to see the match summary.

== Fixtures ==
Source: CPL T20

=== Group stage ===
31 August 2023
15:00
Scorecard

Guyana Amazon Warriors; 166/2 (20 overs)	v	Barbados Royals; 169/4 (19.4 overs)
Sophie Devine 103* (64); Amanda-Jade Wellington 1/28 (4 overs)		Gaby Lewis 47 (35); Shabnim Ismail 1/18 (4 overs)

Barbados Royals won by 6 wickets
Kensington Oval, Bridgetown
Umpires: Maria Abbott (WI) and Jacqueline Williams (WI)
Player of the match: Sophie Devine (Guyana Amazon Warriors)

- Guyana Amazon Warriors won the toss and elected to bat.

2 September 2023
16:00
Scorecard

Trinbago Knight Riders; 73 (16.4 overs)	v	Barbados Royals; 79/4 (10.3 overs)
Kycia Knight 15 (20); Erin Burns 3/19 (4 overs)		Gaby Lewis 27 (27); Fran Jonas 2/29 (3.3 overs)

Barbados Royals won by 6 wickets
Kensington Oval, Bridgetown
Umpires: Candace la Borde (WI) and Jacqueline Williams (WI)
Player of the match: Erin Burns (Barbados Royals)

- Trinbago Knight Riders won the toss and elected to bat.

3 September 2023
16:00
Scorecard

Guyana Amazon Warriors; 146/4 (20 overs)	v	Barbados Royals; 147/7 (19.2 overs)
Sophie Devine 42 (40); Erin Burns 2/32 (4 overs)		Erin Burns 53* (41); Shreyanka Patil 4/34 (4 overs)

Barbados Royals won by 3 wickets
Kensington Oval, Bridgetown
Umpires: Maria Abbott (WI) and Candace la Borde (WI)
Player of the match: Erin Burns (Barbados Royals)

- Guyana Amazon Warriors won the toss and elected to bat.

5 September 2023
15:00
Scorecard

Guyana Amazon Warriors; 132 (19.5 overs)	v	Trinbago Knight Riders; 111/9 (20 overs)
Sophie Devine 48 (39); Anisa Mohammed 4/28 (4 overs)		Deandra Dottin 35 (19); Shreyanka Patil 2/15 (4 overs)

Guyana Amazon Warriors won by 21 runs
Queen's Park Oval, Port of Spain
Umpires: Jacqueline Williams (WI) and Maria Abbott (WI)
Player of the match: Sophie Devine (Guyana Amazon Warriors)

- Guyana Amazon Warriors won the toss and elected to bat.

6 September 2023
15:00
Scorecard

Trinbago Knight Riders; 155/3 (20 overs)	v	Barbados Royals; 142/7 (20 overs)
Deandra Dottin 47 (51); Hayley Matthews 2/23 (4 overs)		Gaby Lewis 62 (51); Zaida James 2/34 (4 overs)

Trinbago Knight Riders won by 13 runs
Queen's Park Oval, Port of Spain
Umpires: Candace la Borde (WI) and Jacqueline Williams (WI)
Player of the match: Mignon du Preez (Trinbago Knight Riders)

- Trinbago Knight Riders won the toss and elected to bat.

9 September 2023
16:00
Scorecard

Trinbago Knight Riders; 72 (17 overs)	v	Guyana Amazon Warriors; 78/1 (7.3 overs)
Deandra Dottin 25 (21); Karishma Ramharack 3/12 (4 overs)		Sophie Devine 38* (19); Deandra Dottin 1/12 (1 over)

Guyana Amazon Warriors won by 9 wickets
Brian Lara Cricket Academy, San Fernando
Umpires: Maria Abbott (WI) and Candace la Borde (WI)
Player of the match: Karishma Ramharack (Guyana Amazon Warriors)

- Trinbago Knight Riders won the toss and elected to bat.

=== Final ===
10 September 2023
16:00
Scorecard

Barbados Royals; 169/7 (20 overs)	v	Guyana Amazon Warriors; 161/8 (20 overs)
Hayley Matthews 82 (59); Shabnim Ismail 4/30 (4 overs)		Shemaine Campbelle 47* (35); Amanda-Jade Wellington 4/23 (4 overs)

Barbados Royals won by 8 runs
Brian Lara Cricket Academy, San Fernando
Umpires: Maria Abbott (WI) and Jacqueline Williams (WI)
Player of the match: Hayley Matthews (Barbados Royals)

- Guyana Amazon Warriors won the toss and elected to field.

== Statistics ==
=== Most runs ===
Player	Team	Matches	Innings	Runs	HS
Sophie Devine	Guyana Amazon Warriors	5	5	253	103*
Hayley Matthews	Barbados Royals	5	5	191	82
Gaby Lewis	Barbados Royals	5	5	159	62
Suzie Bates	Guyana Amazon Warriors	5	5	123	36
Deandra Dottin	Trinbago Knight Riders	3	3	107	47

Source: ESPN Cricinfo

=== Most wickets ===
Player	Team	Matches	Wickets	Best Bowling
Shreyanka Patil	Guyana Amazon Warriors	5	9	4/34
Amanda-Jade Wellington	Barbados Royals	5	8	4/23
Shabnim Ismail	Guyana Amazon Warriors	5	7	4/30
Hayley Matthews	Barbados Royals	5	7	2/16
Marie Kelly	Trinbago Knight Riders	4	6	4/30

Source: ESPN Cricinfo
