= 2022 Women's Caribbean Premier League =

Inaugural season of the Women's Caribbean Premier League

- Dates: 31 August – 4 September 2022
- Administrator: Cricket West Indies
- Cricket format: Twenty20
- Tournament format(s): Group stage and final
- Host(s): St Kitts and Nevis
- Champions: Trinbago Knight Riders (1st title)
- Runners-up: Barbados Royals
- Participants: 3
- Matches: 4
- Player of the series: Deandra Dottin (Trinbago Knight Riders)
- Most runs: Deandra Dottin (Trinbago Knight Riders) (100)
- Most wickets: Shakera Selman (Barbados Royals) (5); Hayley Matthews (Barbados Royals) (5)
- Official website: cplt20.com

The 2022 Women's Caribbean Premier League, known for sponsorship reasons as the Massy WCPL 2022, was the inaugural edition of the Women's Caribbean Premier League, a domestic Twenty20 women's cricket tournament played in the West Indies. The tournament took place from 31 August to 4 September 2022, with all matches played in Saint Kitts. The tournament was preceded by a T10 tournament, known as The 6ixty. The tournament was won by Trinbago Knight Riders.

== Background ==
On 14 March 2022, Cricket West Indies announced their intention to hold the first Women's Caribbean Premier League, to run alongside the men's tournament, which began in 2013. The three teams that would take part in the tournament were announced in March 2022, each aligned with a men's team: Barbados Royals, Guyana Amazon Warriors and Trinbago Knight Riders. On 16 June 2022, the West Indian players playing for each team were confirmed, alongside confirmation that the tournament would take place in Saint Kitts. On 22 June 2022, it was announced that a T10 tournament would precede both the men's and women's tournaments, from 24 to 28 August, known as The 6ixty and involving all of the teams competing in the main tournament. On 16 August 2022, the overseas players playing for each team were confirmed.

== Competition format ==
The three teams played each other team once, therefore playing two matches apiece. Matches were played using a Twenty20 format. The top two teams in the group advanced to the final.

The league worked on a points system with positions being based on the total points. Points were awarded as follows:

Win: 2 points.
Tie: 1 point.
Loss: 0 points.
Abandoned/No Result: 1 point.

== Squads ==
The eleven West Indian players for each team were announced on 16 June 2022, with three additional overseas players per side announced on 16 August 2022.

Barbados Royals	Guyana Amazon Warriors	Trinbago Knight Riders
Hayley Matthews (c); Aaliyah Alleyne; Reniece Boyce; Shanika Bruce; Britney Cooper; Afy Fletcher; Chinelle Henry; Japhina Joseph; Qiana Joseph; Mandy Mangru; Snigdha Paul; Fatima Sana; Shakera Selman; Chloe Tryon	Stafanie Taylor (c); Chamari Athapaththu; Shemaine Campbelle; Shamilia Connell; Cherry-Ann Fraser; Shabika Gajnabi; Zaida James; Ayabonga Khaka; Chedean Nation; Karishma Ramharack; Kaysia Schultz; Isani Vaghela; Rachael Vincent; Rashada Williams	Deandra Dottin (c); Jannillea Glasgow; Sheneta Grimmond; Shawnisha Hector; Caneisha Isaac; Hayley Jensen; Lee-Ann Kirby; Kycia Knight; Kyshona Knight; Geetika Kodali; Suné Luus; Anisa Mohammed; Natasha McLean; Steffie Soogrim

== Points table ==
Pos	Team	Pld	W	L	NR	Pts	NRR	Qualification
1	Trinbago Knight Riders	2	1	0	1	3	0.050	Advanced to the final
2	Barbados Royals	2	1	1	0	2	0.188	Advanced to the final
3	Guyana Amazon Warriors	2	0	1	1	1	−0.421	

Source: Cricbuzz

=== Match summary ===
Team	Group matches		Play-offs
Team	1	2	Final
Barbados Royals	0	2	L
Guyana Amazon Warriors	1	1	—
Trinbago Knight Riders	2	3	W

Win	Loss	Tie	No result	Eliminated

- Note: The total points at the end of each group match are listed.
- Note: Click on the points or results to see the match summary.

== Fixtures ==
Source: CPL T20

=== Group stage ===
Match 1
31 August 2022
15:00
Scorecard

Trinbago Knight Riders; 114/7 (20 overs)	v	Barbados Royals; 113/7 (20 overs)
Lee-Ann Kirby 30 (30); Shakera Selman 2/16 (4 overs)		Chloe Tryon 38 (26); Lee-Ann Kirby 2/32 (4 overs)

Trinbago Knight Riders won by 1 run
Warner Park, Basseterre
Umpires: Jacqueline Williams and Carl Tuckett
Player of the match: Lee-Ann Kirby (Trinbago Knight Riders)

- Trinbago Knight Riders won the toss and elected to bat.

Match 2
1 September 2022
15:00
Scorecard

Trinbago Knight Riders; 105/6 (20 overs)	v	Guyana Amazon Warriors; 13/0 (2 overs)
Hayley Jensen 25* (25); Cherry-Ann Fraser 3/21 (4 overs)		Rashada Williams 7* (8)

No result
Warner Park, Basseterre
Umpires: Maria Abbott and Danesh Ramdhanie

- Guyana Amazon Warriors won the toss and elected to field.
- No further play possible due to rain.

Match 3
3 September 2022
15:00
Scorecard

Guyana Amazon Warriors; 100/7 (20 overs)	v	Barbados Royals; 103/6 (19 overs)
Stafanie Taylor 32* (34); Shakera Selman 2/16 (4 overs)		Qiana Joseph 30* (19); Shamilia Connell 2/9 (4 overs)

Barbados Royals won by 4 wickets
Warner Park, Basseterre
Umpires: Maria Abbott and Danesh Ramdhanie
Player of the match: Qiana Joseph (Barbados Royals)

- Barbados Royals won the toss and elected to field.

=== Final ===
4 September 2022
14:30
Scorecard

Trinbago Knight Riders; 100/7 (20 overs)	v	Barbados Royals; 90 (18.4 overs)
Deandra Dottin 59 (62); Hayley Matthews 3/22 (4 overs)		Hayley Matthews 46 (49); Anisa Mohammed 3/16 (3.4 overs)

Trinbago Knight Riders won by 10 runs
Warner Park, Basseterre
Umpires: Jacqueline Williams and Carl Tuckett
Player of the match: Deandra Dottin (Trinbago Knight Riders)

- Barbados Royals won the toss and elected to field.

== Statistics ==
=== Most runs ===
Player	Team	Matches	Innings	Runs	Average	HS	100s	50s
Deandra Dottin	Trinbago Knight Riders	3	3	100	33.33	59	0	1
Hayley Matthews	Barbados Royals	3	3	86	28.66	46	0	0
Chloe Tryon	Barbados Royals	3	3	64	21.33	38	0	0
Hayley Jensen	Trinbago Knight Riders	3	3	47	47.00	25*	0	0
Qiana Joseph	Barbados Royals	3	3	41	41.00	30*	0	0

Source: CricketArchive

=== Most wickets ===
Player	Team	Overs	Wickets	Average	BBI	5w
Shakera Selman	Barbados Royals	12.0	5	11.20	2/16	0
Hayley Matthews	Barbados Royals	12.0	5	12.40	3/22	0
Anisa Mohammed	Trinbago Knight Riders	5.4	4	6.25	3/16	0
Cherry-Ann Fraser	Guyana Amazon Warriors	8.0	4	13.00	3/21	0
Shamilia Connell	Guyana Amazon Warriors	8.0	3	6.33	2/9	0

Source: CricketArchive
