= Women's Caribbean Premier League =

Professional twenty20 cricket league

- Administrator: Cricket West Indies
- Format: Twenty20
- First edition: 2022
- Latest edition: 2025
- Next edition: 2026
- Tournament format: Double round-robin and final
- Number of teams: 4
- Current champion: Guyana Amazon Warriors (1st title)
- Most successful: Barbados Tridents (3 titles)
- Website: cplt20.com

Season
- 2022 • 2023 • 2024 • 2025 • 2026

The Women's Caribbean Premier League is a women's Twenty20 cricket competition organised by Cricket West Indies. The inaugural tournament took place in 2022, running alongside the equivalent men's tournament.

Three teams competed in the tournament: Barbados Tridents, Guyana Amazon Warriors and Trinbago Knight Riders, each aligned with a men's team of the same name. A fourth team, Jamaica Empress will participate in the 2026 edition.

== History ==
On 14 March 2022, Cricket West Indies announced their intention to hold the first Women's Caribbean Premier League, to run alongside the men's tournament, which began in 2013. The announcement followed a T10 women's tournament taking place ahead of the 2019 Caribbean Premier League final, with two teams playing two matches against each other.

The men's and women's tournaments took place during the same month-long window, between 30 August and 30 September 2022. The three teams that took part in the tournament were announced in March 2022, each aligning with a men's team: Barbados Royals, Guyana Amazon Warriors and Trinbago Knight Riders. On 16 June 2022, it was confirmed that the tournament would take place in Saint Kitts. On 22 June 2022, it was announced that a T10 tournament would precede both the men's and women's tournaments, from 24 to 28 August, known as The 6ixty and involving all of the teams competing in the main tournament.

For the second edition, in 2023, the tournament was expanded, with each team now playing every other team twice in the group stage. Barbados Royals won the tournament, beating Guyana Amazon Warriors in the final.

In the 2026 edition, the tournament was expanded to four teams (with the inclusion of Jamaica Empress and the renaming of Barbados Royals to Barbados Tridents), with each team now playing every other team once in the group stage followed by a playoff and a final.

== Teams ==
Team	Debut	Captain
Barbados Tridents	2022	Hayley Matthews
Guyana Amazon Warriors	2022	Chloe Tryon
Jamaica Empress	2026	Stafanie Taylor
Trinbago Knight Riders	2022	Deandra Dottin

== Tournament results ==
Season	Venue	Final				Leading run-scorer	Leading wicket-taker	Player of the series	Notes
Season	Venue	Winners	Result	Runners-up	Player of the final	Leading run-scorer	Leading wicket-taker	Player of the series	Notes
2022	Warner Park, Basseterre, Saint Kitts and Nevis	Trinbago Knight Riders; 100/7 (20 overs)	Trinbago Knight Riders won by 10 runs Scorecard	Barbados Royals; 90 (18.4 overs)	Deandra Dottin (TKR)	Deandra Dottin (100)	Shakera Selman (5); Hayley Matthews (5)	Deandra Dottin (TKR)	
2023	Brian Lara Cricket Academy, San Fernando, Trinidad and Tobago	Barbados Royals; 169/7 (20 overs)	Barbados Royals won by 8 runs Scorecard	Guyana Amazon Warriors; 161/8 (20 overs)	Hayley Matthews (BR)	Sophie Devine (253)	Shreyanka Patil (9)	Sophie Devine (GAW)	
2024	Brian Lara Cricket Academy, San Fernando, Trinidad and Tobago	Barbados Royals; 94/6 (15 overs)	Barbados Royals won by 4 wickets Scorecard	Trinbago Knight Riders; 93/8 (20 overs)	Aaliyah Alleyne (BR)	Erin Burns (172)	Hayley Matthews (11)	Hayley Matthews (BR)	
2025	Providence Stadium, Providence, Guyana	Barbados Royals; 137/7 (19.4 overs)	Barbados Royals won by 3 wickets Scorecard	Guyana Amazon Warriors; 136/3 (20 overs)	Aaliyah Alleyne (BR)	Chamari Athapaththu (194)	Laura Harris (8); Ashmini Munisar (8)	Chamari Athapaththu (BR)	
2026	Kensington Oval, Bridgetown, Barbados	Guyana Amazon Warriors; 149/8 (19.3 overs)	Guyana Amazon Warriors won by 2 wickets Scorecard	Trinbago Knight Riders; 145/6 (20 overs)	Chedean Nation (GAW)	Shemaine Campbelle (154)	Shikha Pandey (7); Deandra Dottin (7); Shabnim Ismail (7)	Shemaine Campbelle (GAW)	

== Teams' performances ==
Seasons Teams	2022	2023	2024	2025	2026
Barbados Tridents	RU	W	W	W	3rd
Guyana Amazon Warriors	3rd	RU	3rd	RU	W
Jamaica Empress	–				4th
Trinbago Knight Riders	W	3rd	RU	3rd	RU

== See also ==
- Caribbean Premier League
