= Hayley Jensen (cricketer) =

New Zealand cricketer

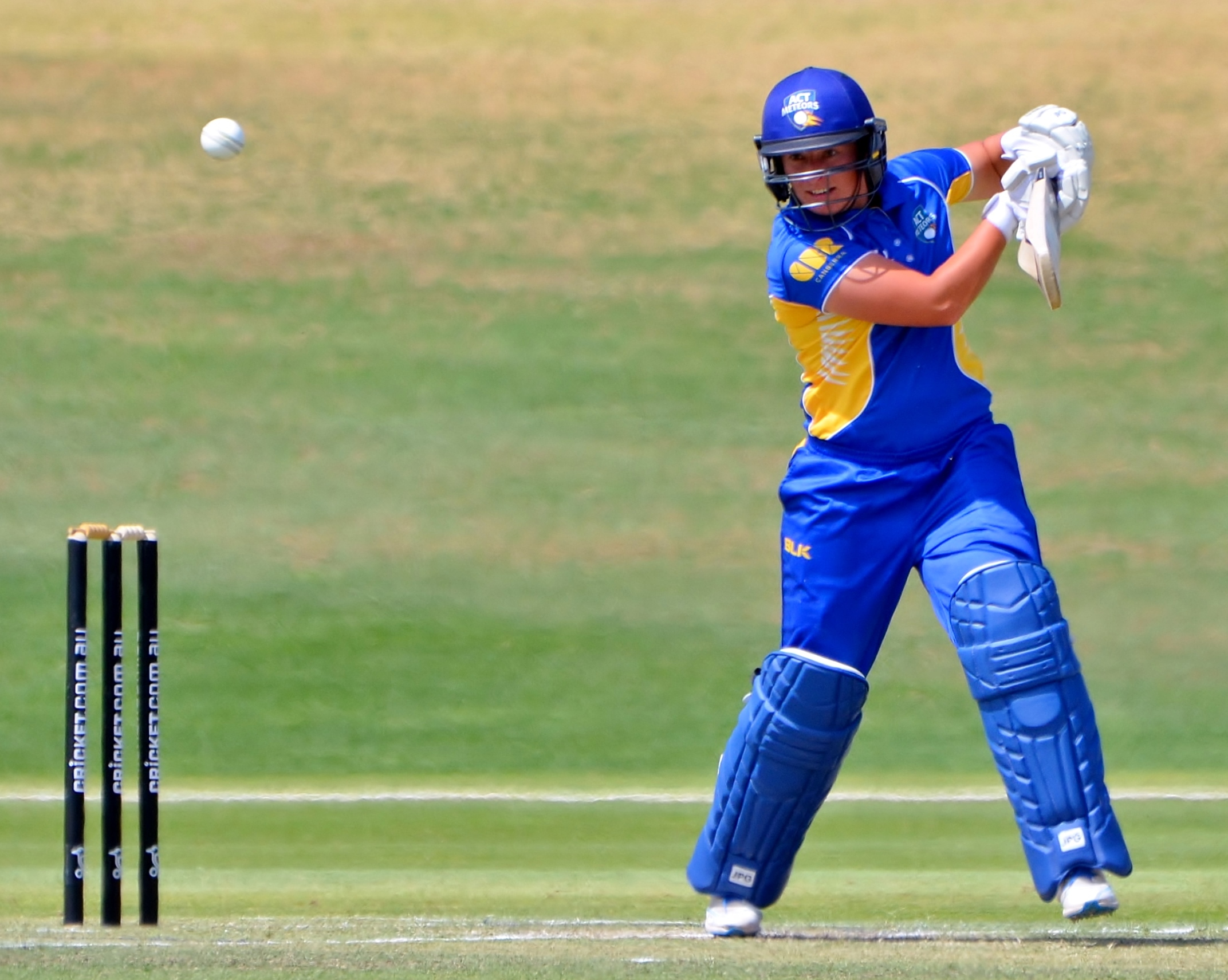
- Jensen batting for the ACT Meteors, 2017

Personal information
- Full name: Hayley Nicole Kayla Jensen
- Born: 7 October 1992 (age 34); Christchurch, New Zealand
- Batting: Right-handed
- Bowling: Right-arm medium
- Role: All-rounder

International information
- National side: New Zealand (2014–2023)
- ODI debut (cap 128): 22 February 2014 v West Indies
- Last ODI: 17 December 2022 v Bangladesh
- T20I debut (cap 39): 1 March 2014 v West Indies
- Last T20I: 13 February 2023 v South Africa

Domestic team information
- Years: Team
- 2009/10–2018/19: Canterbury
- 2015/16–2016/17: Victoria
- 2015/16–2016/17: Melbourne Stars
- 2015/16: Northern Districts
- 2017/18–2018/19: Australian Capital Territory
- 2017/18: Melbourne Renegades
- 2018/19: Perth Scorchers
- 2019/20–present: Otago
- 2020/21: Hobart Hurricanes
- 2022: Trinbago Knight Riders
- 2022/23: Hobart Hurricanes

Career statistics
Competition	WODI	WT20I	WLA	WT20
Matches	35	53	105	133
Runs scored	296	188	1,579	885
Batting average	11.84	8.54	19.02	13.20
100s/50s	0/1	0/0	0/9	0/1
Top score	53	19	83	55
Balls bowled	1,217	986	3,605	2,113
Wickets	28	48	91	93
Bowling average	35.78	20.54	28.83	24.30
5 wickets in innings	0	0	2	0
10 wickets in match	0	0	0	0
Best bowling	3/32	3/5	5/33	3/11
Catches/stumpings	0/0	12/0	16/0	29/0
Medal record
Representing New Zealand
Women's Cricket
Commonwealth Games
Bronze medal – third place	2022 Birmingham	Team
- Source: Cricinfo, 11 February 2023

Hayley Nicole Kayla Jensen (born 7 October 1992) is a New Zealand former cricketer. She lives in Australia, where she played for the ACT Meteors and in the Women's Big Bash League. She appeared in 35 One Day Internationals and 53 Twenty20 Internationals for New Zealand between 2014 and 2023, and amassing 484 runs (296 in ODIs and 188 in T20Is) and taking 76 wickets (28 in ODIs and 48 in T20Is) for her country.

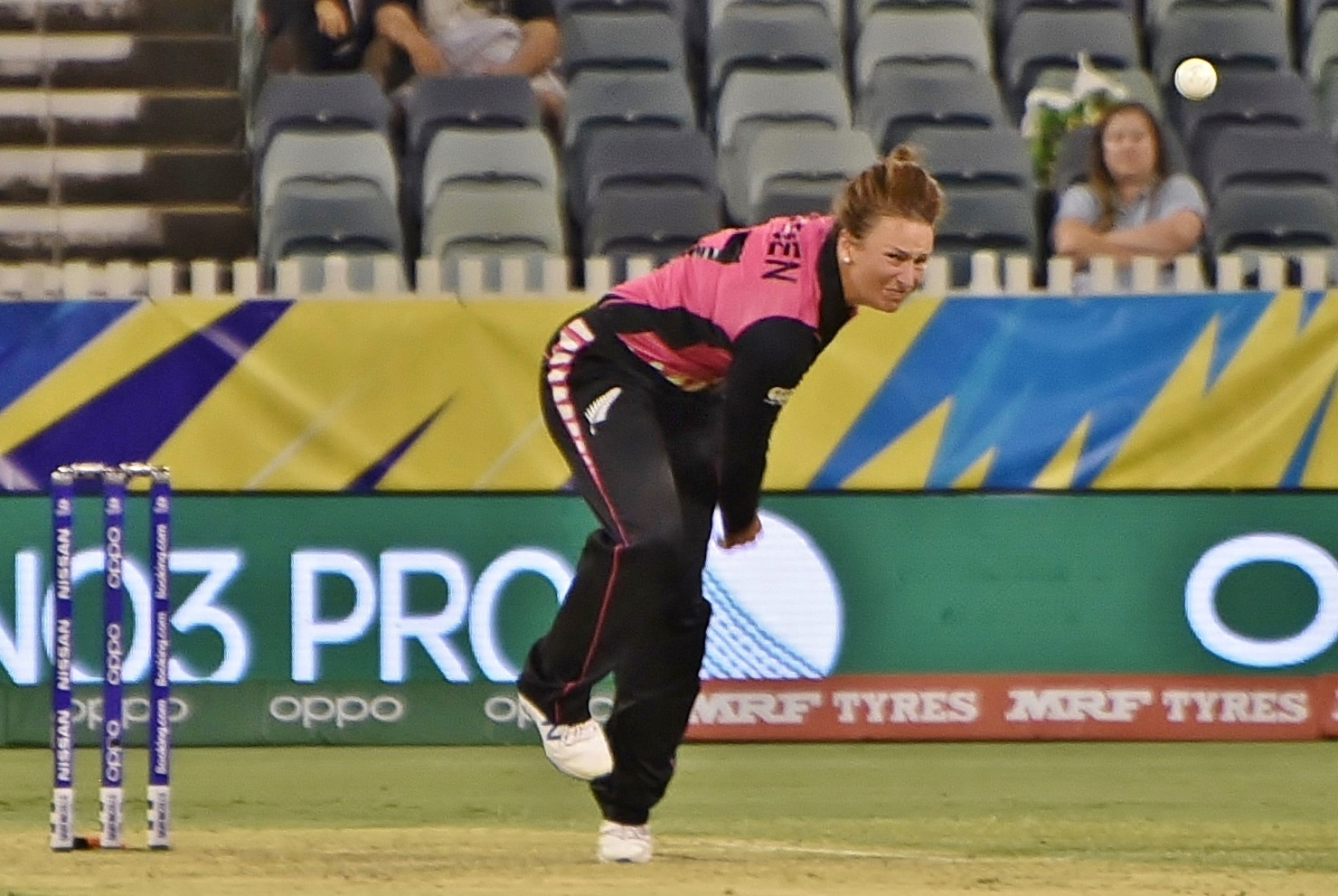
Jensen bowling for New Zealand during the 2020 ICC Women's T20 World Cup

In June 2016, Jensen was banned from cricket for six months by Cricket Australia for betting AUD 2 on the first men's Test match between New Zealand and Australia at the Gabba in November 2015. In August 2018, she was awarded a central contract by New Zealand Cricket, after touring Ireland and England in the previous months. In October 2018, she was named in New Zealand's squad for the 2018 ICC Women's World Twenty20 tournament in the West Indies.

In January 2020, she was named in New Zealand's squad for the 2020 ICC Women's T20 World Cup in Australia. She was the leading wicket-taker for New Zealand in the tournament, with seven dismissals in four matches. In February 2022, she was named in New Zealand's team for the 2022 Women's Cricket World Cup in New Zealand. In June 2022, Jensen was named in New Zealand's team for the cricket tournament at the 2022 Commonwealth Games in Birmingham, England. In August 2022, she was signed as an overseas player for Trinbago Knight Riders for the inaugural edition of the Women's Caribbean Premier League.

In May 2025, she announced her retirement from international cricket.
