= Guyana Amazon Warriors (WCPL) =

West Indian women's cricket team

- Official logo of the Guyana Amazon Warriors (WCPL)

Personnel
- Captain: Chloe Tryon
- Coach: Shakera Selman

Team information
- Colours: Gold Green Red Black White
- Established: 2022
- Home ground: Providence Stadium
- Capacity: 20,000

History
- WCPL wins: 1 (2026)
- 6ixty wins: 0
- Official website: Guyana Amazon Warriors
T20I kit

The Guyana Amazon Warriors are a women's cricket team that compete in the Women's Caribbean Premier League and The 6ixty, representing Guyana. The formation of the team was announced in March 2022, aligned with the equivalent men's team, playing their first match in August 2022. The team is captained by Shemaine Campbelle.

== History ==
On 14 March 2022, Cricket West Indies announced their intention to hold the first Women's Caribbean Premier League, to run alongside the men's tournament, which began in 2013. Guyana Amazon Warriors were one of three teams announced to be taking part in the tournament, aligned with one of the men's teams. The team's squad was announced on 16 June 2022, with Stafanie Taylor announced as captain of the team. The inaugural Women's Caribbean Premier League is scheduled to begin on 31 August 2022.

On 22 June 2022, it was announced that a T10 tournament would precede the Women's CPL, taking place from 24 to 28 August, known as The 6ixty and involving the three teams competing in the main tournament. The side finished bottom of the group in the inaugural edition of The 6ixty. They also finished bottom of the group in the inaugural Women's Caribbean Premier League.

They reached the final of the 2023 Women's Caribbean Premier League, but lost to Barbados Royals. After finishing third in 2024, the team would make the 2025 final only to lose once more to the Barbados Royals, who took their third consecutive title. 2026 season, in the final, Guyana Amazon Warriors defeated Trinbago Knight Riders by 2 wickets to win their maiden title.

== Current squad ==
As per 2026 season.

- Players in **bold** have international caps.

Name	Nationality	Birth date	Batting style	Bowling style	Notes
Batters
**Britney Cooper**	West Indies	23 August 1989 (age 37)	Right-handed	Right-arm medium	
**Chedean Nation**	West Indies	31 October 1986 (age 39)	Right-handed		
**Realeanna Grimmond**	West Indies	24 February 2005 (age 21)	Right-handed	Right-arm medium	
All-rounders
Laura Harris	Australia	18 August 1990 (age 36)	Right-handed	Right-arm off break	Overseas player
**Stafanie Taylor**	West Indies	11 June 1991 (age 35)	Right-handed	Right-arm off break	
**Cherry-Ann Fraser**	West Indies	21 July 1999 (age 27)	Left-handed	Right-arm medium	
**Ashmini Munisar**	West Indies	7 December 2003 (age 22)	Right-handed	Right-arm off break	
**Dane van Niekerk**	South Africa	14 May 1993 (age 33)	Right-handed	Right-arm leg break	Overseas player
Wicket-keepers
**Shemaine Campbelle**	West Indies	14 October 1992 (age 33)	Right-handed	Right-arm medium-fast	Captain
**Amy Hunter**	Ireland	11 October 2005 (age 20)	Right-handed		Overseas player
Bowlers
**Molly Penfold**	New Zealand	15 June 2001 (age 25)	Right-handed	Right-arm medium	Overseas player
**Karishma Ramharack**	West Indies	20 January 1995 (age 31)	Left-handed	Right-arm off break	
Nyia Latchman	West Indies	27 June 2005 (age 21)	Right-handed	Right-arm leg break	
Plaffiana Millington	West Indies	6 January 1998 (age 28)	Right-handed	Right-arm off break	
**Kaysia Schultz**	West Indies	17 April 1997 (age 29)	Right-handed	Slow left-arm orthodox	

Dane van Niekerk, Amy Hunter and Molly Penfold were brought in as replacement overseas players after Shabnim Ismail, Lauren Winfield-Hill and Madeline Penna withdrew from the 2025 season.

== Seasons ==
=== Women's Caribbean Premier League ===
Season	League standings								Final Position
Season	P	W	L	T	A/NR	NRR	Pts	Pos	Final Position
2022	2	0	1	0	1	–0.421	1	3rd	League stage
2023	4	2	2	0	0	+1.417	4	2nd	Runners-up
2024	4	1	3	0	0	0.013	2	3rd	League stage
2025	4	2	2	0	0	+0.057	4	2nd	Runners-up

=== The 6ixty ===
Season	League standings								Final Position
Season	P	W	L	T	A/C	NRR	Pts	Pos	Final Position
2022	4	2	2	0	0	–0.847	4	3rd	League stage

== See also ==
- Guyana Amazon Warriors
- Guyana women's national cricket team
