= Cricket at the 2022 Commonwealth Games =

International cricket tournament

- Pictogram of the 2022 Commonwealth Games cricket tournament
- Dates: 29 July – 7 August 2022
- Administrator: Commonwealth Games Federation
- Cricket format: Women's Twenty20 International
- Tournament format(s): Round robin and knockout
- Host: England
- Champions: Australia (1st title)
- Runners-up: India
- Third place: New Zealand
- Participants: 8
- Matches: 16
- Most runs: (Australia) Beth Mooney (179)
- Most wickets: (India) Renuka Singh Thakur (11)

A cricket tournament was held at the 2022 Commonwealth Games in Birmingham, England, during July and August 2022. It was cricket's first inclusion in the Commonwealth Games since a List A men's tournament was held at the 1998 Commonwealth Games in Kuala Lumpur, Malaysia. The matches were played as Women's Twenty20 Internationals (WT20Is), with only a women's tournament being part of the Games.

Australia became the first team to qualify for the semi-finals, after winning their first two matches in Group A. New Zealand's win over Sri Lanka in the second round of matches ensured their own and England's progression to the semi-finals. India completed the semi-final line-up, beating Barbados in their final group match. India won the first semi-final, beating England by 4 runs. Australia won the second semi-final, beating New Zealand by 5 wickets.

New Zealand claimed the bronze medal after beating England by 8 wickets in the Bronze Medal Match. Australia claimed the gold medal after beating India by 9 runs, with India taking silver. Australian batter Beth Mooney was the leading run-scorer in the tournament, with 179 runs, whilst India's Renuka Singh was the leading wicket-taker, with 11 wickets.

== Schedule ==
The competition schedule for the cricket tournament was as follows:

G	Group stage	½	Semi-finals	B	Bronze medal match	F	Gold medal match

Date Event	Fri 29		Sat 30		Sun 31		Mon 1		Tue 2		Wed 3		Thu 4		Fri 5		Sat 6		Sun 7	
Session →	M	E	M	E	M	E	M	E	M	E	M	E	M	E	M	E	M	E	M	E
Women	G		G		G				G		G		G				1/2		B	F

In April 2021 the International Cricket Council (ICC) announced that all matches at the tournament would hold Twenty20 International status. The dates of the tournament were confirmed in June 2021.

== Background ==
The Commonwealth Games 2022 was held in Birmingham, England, from 28 July to 9 August and had over 5,000 athletes representing 72 Commonwealth Games Associations taking part. Under Commonwealth Games rules, all core Commonwealth sports must be hosted but additional sports may be added by the local organising committee. In November 2018, the International Cricket Council (ICC) and the England and Wales Cricket Board (ECB) made a joint bid for a women's Twenty20 tournament to be included. In August 2019, the Commonwealth Games Federation announced that the bid had been successful after a vote of all 72 Commonwealth Games Associations with women's cricket being added to the 2022 programme along with beach volleyball and para table tennis. The Marylebone Cricket Club (MCC), as custodian of the Laws of Cricket, welcomed the move and hoped it would eventually lead to cricket's inclusion in the 2028 Summer Olympics.

== Venues ==
The tournament was played in Twenty20 format with eight teams qualifying. Edgbaston Cricket Ground in Birmingham was the venue for the matches. Though there were suggestions for matches to also be held at the County Cricket Ground, Derby; New Road, Worcester; and Grace Road, Leicester, none of these were selected in the final confirmation.

== Qualification ==
In November 2020, the ICC announced the qualification process for the 2022 Commonwealth Games tournament. England automatically qualified as the hosts, along with the six highest ranked sides as of 1 April 2021 as direct qualifiers. One further place was awarded to the winners of the 2022 Commonwealth Games Cricket Qualifier.

The allocation of the six direct qualifiers via the ICC Women's T20I rankings was dependent on the representation of at least four out of the six Commonwealth Games Federation regions (Africa, Americas, Asia, Caribbean, Europe and Oceania). If at least four regions were not represented from those in the top seven, then teams ranked eighth to tenth were the first to be considered to meet the criteria, before filling the remaining allocations from the rankings. Each team can enter a squad of up to 15 athletes.

As the West Indies qualified as a direct qualifier, the results of a separate tournament were originally going to be used to determine which Commonwealth Games Association (CGA) earned qualification. The tournament was scheduled to be contested between Barbados, Guyana, Jamaica, Trinidad and Tobago and two composite teams representing the Leeward Islands and Windward Islands. However, in August 2021, Cricket West Indies (CWI) confirmed that the regional qualifier had been postponed due to the COVID-19 pandemic. As a result, Barbados were selected to represent the West Indies, by virtue of being the Twenty20 Blaze defending champions. The Commonwealth Games Qualifier, to determine the final team, took place in Malaysia in January 2022. Sri Lanka won the qualifier, beating Bangladesh by 22 runs in the final match of the tournament, to secure their place at the Commonwealth Games.

Means of qualification	Date	Venue	Berths	Qualified
Host nation	—N/a	—N/a	1	England
ICC Women's T20I rankings	1 April 2021	—N/a	5	Australia; India; New Zealand; South Africa; Pakistan
West Indies Region (Note: Since the West Indies qualified directly to the event due to being in the top six teams in the Women's T20 rankings, but being ineligible to participate as it constitutes a group of nations and territories that are represented separately in the Commonwealth Games, a qualifier event was scheduled to be held among the teams of nations and territories represented by the West Indies to decide the team to be qualified to the event. Due to the regional qualifier being postponed, Barbados qualified by virtue of being the Twenty20 Blaze defending champions.)	—N/a	—N/a	1	Barbados
Commonwealth Games Qualifier	18–24 January 2022	Malaysia	1	Sri Lanka
Total			8	

== Officials ==
A total of 8 Umpires and 2 Match Referees were selected for the tournament.

Umpires		Match Referees
Lauren Agenbag (South Africa)	Vrinda Rathi (India)	Shandre Fritz (South Africa)
Kim Cotton (New Zealand)	Sue Redfern (England)	G.S. Lakshmi (India)
Shivani Mishra (Qatar)	Eloise Sheridan (Australia)	
Claire Polosak (Australia)	Jacqueline Williams (Jamaica)	

== Squads ==
The following squads were named for the tournament.

Australia	Barbados	England	India
Meg Lanning (c); Rachael Haynes (vc); Darcie Brown; Nicola Carey; Ashleigh Gardner; Grace Harris; Alyssa Healy; Jess Jonassen; Alana King; Tahlia McGrath; Beth Mooney; Ellyse Perry; Megan Schutt; Annabel Sutherland; Amanda-Jade Wellington	Hayley Matthews (c); Aaliyah Alleyne; Shanika Bruce; Shai Carrington; Shaunte Carrington; Shamilia Connell; Deandra Dottin; Keila Elliott; Trishan Holder; Kycia Knight; Kyshona Knight; Alisa Scantlebury; Shakera Selman; Tiffany Thorpe; Aaliyah Williams	Heather Knight (c); Nat Sciver (vc); Maia Bouchier; Katherine Brunt; Alice Capsey; Kate Cross; Freya Davies; Sophia Dunkley; Sophie Ecclestone; Sarah Glenn; Amy Jones; Freya Kemp; Bryony Smith; Issy Wong; Danni Wyatt	Harmanpreet Kaur (c); Smriti Mandhana (vc); Taniya Bhatia (wk); Yastika Bhatia (wk); Harleen Deol; Rajeshwari Gayakwad; Sabbhineni Meghana; Sneh Rana; Jemimah Rodrigues; Deepti Sharma; Meghna Singh; Renuka Singh; Pooja Vastrakar; Shafali Verma; Radha Yadav
New Zealand	Pakistan	South Africa	Sri Lanka
Sophie Devine (c); Suzie Bates; Eden Carson; ~~Lauren Down~~; Izzy Gaze (wk); Claudia Green; Maddy Green; Brooke Halliday; Hayley Jensen; Fran Jonas; ~~Jess Kerr~~; Amelia Kerr; Rosemary Mair; Jess McFadyen (wk); Georgia Plimmer; Hannah Rowe; Lea Tahuhu	Bismah Maroof (c); Muneeba Ali (wk); Anam Amin; Aiman Anwer; Diana Baig; Nida Dar; Gull Feroza (wk); Tuba Hassan; Kainat Imtiaz; Sadia Iqbal; Iram Javed; Ayesha Naseem; Aliya Riaz; Fatima Sana; Omaima Sohail	Suné Luus (c); Anneke Bosch; Tazmin Brits; ~~Trisha Chetty~~; Lara Goodall; Shabnim Ismail; Sinalo Jafta; ~~Marizanne Kapp~~; Ayabonga Khaka; Masabata Klaas; Nadine de Klerk; Nonkululeko Mlaba; Mignon du Preez; ~~Tumi Sekhukhune~~; Chloe Tryon; Delmi Tucker; Laura Wolvaardt	Chamari Athapaththu (c); Nilakshi de Silva; Kavisha Dilhari; Vishmi Gunaratne; Ama Kanchana; Achini Kulasuriya; Sugandika Kumari; Hasini Perera; Udeshika Prabodhani; Oshadi Ranasinghe; Inoka Ranaweera; Harshitha Samarawickrama; Anushka Sanjeewani; Malsha Shehani; Rashmi Silva

Prior to the Games, Lauren Down and Jess Kerr were both ruled out of New Zealand's squad with Lea Tahuhu and Claudia Green named as their replacements. India also named Simran Bahadur, Richa Ghosh and Poonam Yadav as standby players in their squad. Marizanne Kapp was ruled out of South Africa's squad due to family reasons. Trisha Chetty and Tumi Sekhukhune were also ruled out of South Africa's squad due to injuries. As a result, Delmi Tucker and Tazmin Brits were both added to their squad. England's captain Heather Knight was ruled out of their first match due to a hip injury, with Nat Sciver named as the team captain in her place.

== Group stage ==
The schedule for the tournament was announced in June 2021, with the full list of fixtures being confirmed in November 2021. The ICC confirmed that all matches, including those involving Barbados (whose players would usually represent the West Indies), will be designated as Twenty20 Internationals.

=== Group A ===
Pos	Team	Pld	W	L	NR	Pts	NRR
1	Australia	3	3	0	0	6	2.832
2	India	3	2	1	0	4	2.511
3	Barbados	3	1	2	0	2	−2.953
4	Pakistan	3	0	3	0	0	−1.768

Source: ESPNcricinfo

Advanced to the semi-finals

29 July 2022
11:00
Scorecard

India; 154/8 (20 overs)	v	Australia; 157/7 (19 overs)
Harmanpreet Kaur 52 (34); Jess Jonassen 4/22 (4 overs)		Ashleigh Gardner 52* (35); Renuka Singh Thakur 4/18 (4 overs)

Australia won by 3 wickets
Edgbaston, Birmingham
Umpires: Lauren Agenbag (SA) and Sue Redfern (Eng)
Player of the match: Ashleigh Gardner (Aus)

- India won the toss and elected to bat.
- Meghna Singh (Ind) made her WT20I debut.
- Alyssa Healy (Aus) became the first player, male or female, to take 100 dismissals as a wicket-keeper in T20I cricket.

29 July 2022
18:00 (D/N)
Scorecard

Barbados; 144/4 (20 overs)	v	Pakistan; 129/6 (20 overs)
Kycia Knight 62* (56); Fatima Sana 2/41 (4 overs)		Nida Dar 50* (31); Hayley Matthews 1/13 (4 overs)

Barbados won by 15 runs
Edgbaston, Birmingham
Umpires: Kim Cotton (NZ) and Shivani Mishra (Qat)
Player of the match: Hayley Matthews (Bar)

- Pakistan won the toss and elected to field.
- Shanika Bruce, Trishan Holder, Alisa Scantlebury and Aaliyah Williams (Bar) all made their WT20I debuts. (Note: Aaliyah Alleyne, Shamilia Connell, Deandra Dottin, Kycia Knight, Kyshona Knight, Hayley Matthews and Shakera Selman – all capped in WT20Is for the West Indies – also made their WT20I debuts for Barbados.)

31 July 2022
11:00
Scorecard

Pakistan; 99 (18 overs)	v	India; 102/2 (11.4 overs)
Muneeba Ali 32 (30); Sneh Rana 2/15 (4 overs)		Smriti Mandhana 63* (42); Tuba Hassan 1/18 (2 overs)

India won by 8 wickets
Edgbaston, Birmingham
Umpires: Lauren Agenbag (SA) and Kim Cotton (NZ)
Player of the match: Smriti Mandhana (Ind)

- Pakistan won the toss and elected to bat.
- The match was reduced to 18 overs per side due to rain.

31 July 2022
18:00 (D/N)
Scorecard

Barbados; 64 (20 overs)	v	Australia; 68/1 (8.1 overs)
Hayley Matthews 18 (13); Alana King 4/8 (4 overs)		Meg Lanning 36* (21); Shanika Bruce 1/7 (2 overs)

Australia won by 9 wickets
Edgbaston, Birmingham
Umpires: Shivani Mishra (Qat) and Sue Redfern (Eng)
Player of the match: Alana King (Aus)

- Australia won the toss and elected to field.
- Keila Elliott (Bar) made her WT20I debut.

3 August 2022
11:00
Scorecard

Australia; 160/2 (20 overs)	v	Pakistan; 116/8 (20 overs)
Tahlia McGrath 78* (51); Sadia Iqbal 1/28 (4 overs)		Fatima Sana 35* (26); Tahlia McGrath 3/13 (3 overs)

Australia won by 44 runs
Edgbaston, Birmingham
Umpires: Lauren Agenbag (SA) and Sue Redfern (Eng)
Player of the match: Tahlia McGrath (Aus)

- Australia won the toss and elected to bat.

3 August 2022
18:00 (D/N)
Scorecard

India; 162/4 (20 overs)	v	Barbados; 62/8 (20 overs)
Jemimah Rodrigues 56* (46); Shanika Bruce 1/17 (2 overs)		Kyshona Knight 16 (20); Renuka Singh Thakur 4/10 (4 overs)

India won by 100 runs
Edgbaston, Birmingham
Umpires: Kim Cotton (NZ) and Shivani Mishra (Qat)
Player of the match: Renuka Singh Thakur (Ind)

- Barbados won the toss and elected to field.
- Shaunte Carrington (Bar) made her WT20I debut.

=== Group B ===
Pos	Team	Pld	W	L	NR	Pts	NRR
1	England	3	3	0	0	6	1.826
2	New Zealand	3	2	1	0	4	0.068
3	South Africa	3	1	2	0	2	1.118
4	Sri Lanka	3	0	3	0	0	−2.805

Source: ESPNcricinfo

Advanced to the semi-finals

30 July 2022
11:00
Scorecard

New Zealand; 167/2 (20 overs)	v	South Africa; 154/7 (20 overs)
Suzie Bates 91* (64); Nonkululeko Mlaba 1/33 (4 overs)		Chloe Tryon 39 (17); Sophie Devine 3/37 (4 overs)

New Zealand won by 13 runs
Edgbaston, Birmingham
Umpires: Claire Polosak (Aus) and Vrinda Rathi (Ind)
Player of the match: Suzie Bates (NZ)

- South Africa won the toss and elected to field.
- Eden Carson, Izzy Gaze and Fran Jonas (NZ) all made their WT20I debuts.
- Sophie Devine (NZ) took her 100th wicket in WT20Is.

30 July 2022
18:00 (D/N)
Scorecard

Sri Lanka; 106/9 (20 overs)	v	England; 109/5 (17.1 overs)
Nilakshi de Silva 25 (28); Sophie Ecclestone 3/25 (4 overs)		Alice Capsey 44 (45); Inoka Ranaweera 3/29 (4 overs)

England won by 5 wickets
Edgbaston, Birmingham
Umpires: Eloise Sheridan (Aus) and Jacqueline Williams (WI)
Player of the match: Alice Capsey (Eng)

- Sri Lanka won the toss and elected to bat.
- Katherine Brunt (Eng) played in her 100th WT20I.

2 August 2022
11:00
Scorecard

England; 167/5 (20 overs)	v	South Africa; 141/4 (20 overs)
Alice Capsey 50 (37); Shabnim Ismail 2/27 (4 overs)		Laura Wolvaardt 41* (33); Katherine Brunt 1/16 (3 overs)

England won by 26 runs
Edgbaston, Birmingham
Umpires: Claire Polosak (Aus) and Vrinda Rathi (Ind)
Player of the match: Alice Capsey (Eng)

- South Africa won the toss and elected to field.

2 August 2022
18:00 (D/N)
Scorecard

New Zealand; 147/7 (20 overs)	v	Sri Lanka; 102/8 (20 overs)
Suzie Bates 34 (32); Inoka Ranaweera 3/30 (4 overs)		Nilakshi de Silva 36 (35); Hayley Jensen 3/5 (4 overs)

New Zealand won by 45 runs
Edgbaston, Birmingham
Umpires: Eloise Sheridan (Aus) and Jacqueline Williams (WI)
Player of the match: Hayley Jensen (NZ)

- New Zealand won the toss and elected to bat.

4 August 2022
11:00
Scorecard

Sri Lanka; 46 (17.1 overs)	v	South Africa; 47/0 (6.1 overs)
Chamari Athapaththu 15 (29); Nadine de Klerk 3/7 (4 overs)		Tazmin Brits 21* (21)

South Africa won by 10 wickets
Edgbaston, Birmingham
Umpires: Claire Polosak (Aus) and Jacqueline Williams (WI)
Player of the match: Nadine de Klerk (SA)

- South Africa won the toss and elected to field.

4 August 2022
18:00 (D/N)
Scorecard

New Zealand; 71/9 (20 overs)	v	England; 72/3 (11.4 overs)
Maddy Green 19 (24); Katherine Brunt 2/4 (3 overs)		Alice Capsey 23 (19); Amelia Kerr 2/27 (4 overs)

England won by 7 wickets
Edgbaston, Birmingham
Umpires: Vrinda Rathi (Ind) and Eloise Sheridan (Aus)
Player of the match: Katherine Brunt (Eng)

- New Zealand won the toss and elected to bat.

== Medal round ==
Semi-finals
A2	India	164/5 (20 overs)
B1	England	160/6 (20 overs)
B2	New Zealand	144/7 (20 overs)
A1	Australia	145/5 (19.3 overs)

Gold medal match
A1	Australia	161/8 (20 overs)
A2	India	152 (19.3 overs)
Bronze medal match
B1	England	110/9 (20 overs)
B2	New Zealand	111/2 (11.5 overs)

=== Semi-finals ===
The schedule and timings of the semi-finals were confirmed on 5 August 2022.

6 August 2022
11:00
Scorecard

India; 164/5 (20 overs)	v	England; 160/6 (20 overs)
Smriti Mandhana 61 (32); Freya Kemp 2/22 (3 overs)		Nat Sciver 41 (43); Sneh Rana 2/28 (4 overs)

India won by 4 runs
Edgbaston, Birmingham
Umpires: Kim Cotton (NZ) and Eloise Sheridan (Aus)
Player of the match: Smriti Mandhana (Ind)

- India won the toss and elected to bat.

6 August 2022
18:00 (D/N)
Scorecard

New Zealand; 144/7 (20 overs)	v	Australia; 145/5 (19.3 overs)
Sophie Devine 53 (48); Megan Schutt 3/20 (4 overs)		Beth Mooney 36 (29); Lea Tahuhu 3/20 (4 overs)

Australia won by 5 wickets
Edgbaston, Birmingham
Umpires: Lauren Agenbag (SA) and Jacqueline Williams (WI)
Player of the match: Sophie Devine (NZ)

- Australia won the toss and elected to field.
- Georgia Plimmer (NZ) made her WT20I debut.

=== Bronze medal match ===
7 August 2022
10:00
Scorecard

England; 110/9 (20 overs)	v	New Zealand; 111/2 (11.5 overs)
Nat Sciver 27 (19); Hayley Jensen 3/24 (4 overs)		Sophie Devine 51* (40); Nat Sciver 1/8 (1 over)

New Zealand won by 8 wickets
Edgbaston, Birmingham
Umpires: Lauren Agenbag (SA) and Eloise Sheridan (Aus)
Player of the match: Sophie Devine (NZ)

- England won the toss and elected to bat.

=== Gold medal match ===
7 August 2022
17:00 (D/N)
Scorecard

Australia; 161/8 (20 overs)	v	India; 152 (19.3 overs)
Beth Mooney 61 (41); Renuka Singh Thakur 2/25 (4 overs)		Harmanpreet Kaur 65 (43); Ashleigh Gardner 3/16 (3 overs)

Australia won by 9 runs
Edgbaston, Birmingham
Umpires: Kim Cotton (NZ) and Jacqueline Williams (WI)
Player of the match: Beth Mooney (Aus)

- Australia won the toss and elected to bat.
- Yastika Bhatia (Ind) replaced Taniya Bhatia as a concussion substitute.

== Final standings ==
The final standings were as follows:

Pos.	Team
1st place, gold medalist(s)	Australia
2nd place, silver medalist(s)	India
3rd place, bronze medalist(s)	New Zealand
4	England
5	South Africa
6	Barbados
7	Pakistan
8	Sri Lanka

== Statistics ==
=== Most runs ===
Player	Innings	Runs	Average	HS	100	50
(Australia) Beth Mooney	5	179	44.75	70*	0	2
(New Zealand) Sophie Devine	5	177	44.25	53	0	2
(India) Smriti Mandhana	5	159	39.75	63*	0	2
(New Zealand) Suzie Bates	5	151	37.75	91*	0	1
(India) Jemimah Rodrigues	5	146	73.00	56*	0	1
Source: ESPNcricinfo

=== Most wickets ===
Player	Innings	Wickets	BBI	Avg	Econ	SR	5W
(India) Renuka Singh Thakur	5	11	4/10	9.45	5.47	10.3	0
(Australia) Tahlia McGrath	5	8	3/13	12.12	6.92	10.5	0
(Australia) Megan Schutt	5	8	3/20	13.50	6.00	13.5	0
(India) Sneh Rana	4	7	2/15	12.42	6.21	12.0	0
(New Zealand) Hayley Jensen	5	7	3/5	14.28	5.35	16.0	0
Source: ESPNcricinfo
