= Cannings =

Cannings may refer to:

- Cannings Foods Limited
- The manor of Cannings in Bishops Cannings in Wiltshire
