= Jamaica Empress =

Jamaica based franchise cricket team in the Women's Caribbean Premier League

- League: Women's Caribbean Premier League

Personnel
- Captain: Stafanie Taylor
- Owner: FKS Group

Team information
- City: Kingston, Jamaica
- Founded: 2026
- Home ground: Sabina Park
- Capacity: 20,000

The Jamaica Empress is a women's professional Twenty20 cricket team based in Kingston, Jamaica, that competes in the Women's Caribbean Premier League (WCPL). Established in 2026, the team was founded following the acquisition of a new franchise slot by Pakistani businessman Fawad Sarwar who also owns the Jamaica Kingsmen.

== Home ground ==
The Jamaica Empress play their home matches at the historic Sabina Park in Kingston.

== Seasons ==
Season	P	W	L	T	NR	Pos.	Final Position	Most Runs	Most Wickets
2026	3	1	2	0	0	4th	League Stage	Meg Lanning (94)	Stafanie Taylor (6)

== See also ==
- Cricket in the West Indies
- Jamaica Tallawahs
- Jamaica Kingsmen
