= Natasha McLean =

West Indian cricketer (born 1994)

Personal information
- Full name: Natasha Yannick McLean
- Born: 22 December 1994 (age 31); Spanish Town, Jamaica
- Batting: Right-handed
- Bowling: Right-arm medium
- Role: Wicket-keeper

International information
- National side: West Indies (2012–present)
- ODI debut (cap 76): 27 April 2012 v Sri Lanka
- Last ODI: 25 September 2022 v New Zealand
- T20I debut (cap 28): 9 May 2012 v Sri Lanka
- Last T20I: 6 October 2022 v New Zealand

Domestic team information
- Years: Team
- 2010–present: Jamaica
- 2022: Trinbago Knight Riders
- 2023–present: Guyana Amazon Warriors

Career statistics
Competition	WODI	WT20I
Matches	33	39
Runs scored	441	435
Batting average	14.70	15.53
100s/50s	0/2	0/1
Top score	82	57*
Catches/stumpings	6/0	11/–
- Source: ESPNCricinfo, 15 October 2022

Natasha Yannick McLean (born 22 December 1994) is a Jamaican cricketer who plays as a wicket-keeper and right-handed batter. She made both her One Day International and Twenty20 International debut against Sri Lanka in April and May 2012, respectively. In October 2018, she was named in the West Indies squad for the 2018 ICC Women's World Twenty20 tournament in the West Indies. In July 2019, Cricket West Indies awarded her a central contract for the first time, ahead of the 2019–20 season. She plays domestic cricket for Jamaica and Trinbago Knight Riders.
