= Lee-Ann Kirby =

Trinidad and Tobago cricketer

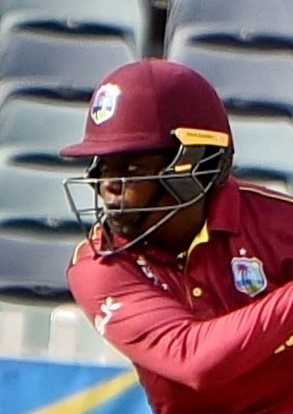
- Kirby batting for the West Indies during the 2020 ICC Women's T20 World Cup

Personal information
- Full name: Lee-Ann Giselle Laureel Kirby
- Born: 7 April 1987 (age 39); Arima, Trinidad
- Batting: Right-handed
- Bowling: Right-arm medium
- Role: Bowler

International information
- National side: West Indies (2008–present)
- ODI debut (cap 64): 2 July 2008 v Netherlands
- Last ODI: 9 July 2008 v Netherlands
- T20I debut (cap 13): 1 July 2008 v Netherlands
- Last T20I: 28 September 2020 v England

Domestic team information
- Years: Team
- 2003–present: Trinidad and Tobago
- 2022–present: Trinbago Knight Riders

Career statistics
Competition	WODI	WT20I
Matches	4	9
Runs scored	40	59
Batting average	20.00	7.37
100s/50s	0/0	0/0
Top score	21*	20
Balls bowled	66	18
Wickets	3	1
Bowling average	14.00	8.00
5 wickets in innings	0	0
10 wickets in match	0	0
Best bowling	2/12	1/8
Catches/stumpings	0/–	4/–
- Source: ESPNcricinfo, 21 May 2021

Lee-Ann Giselle Laureel Kirby (born 7 April 1987) is a Trinidadian cricketer who plays for Trinidad and Tobago, Trinbago Knight Riders and the West Indies as a right-arm medium bowler. After playing six times for the West Indies in 2008 against the Netherlands, Kirby was recalled to the side after nearly 12 years for the 2020 ICC Women's T20 World Cup.

Kirby made her debut for the West Indies in early July 2008, when she travelled to the Netherlands with the squad. Her debut came on 1 July, in a Twenty20 International, but Kirby did not bat or bowl during a seven wicket win for her side. The next day, she made her One Day International debut, at the same ground in Utrecht. She batted at number eight, scoring 21* from 24 balls to help her side reach 239/6. She then bowled two overs without taking a wicket. The following day, the teams played another ODI in Utrecht. Kirby was the seventh bowler used by the West Indies, but eventually bowled five overs, taking two wickets and conceding twelve runs, to help guide her side to a 20 run victory. The tour then moved to Deventer; in the Twenty20 International match she scored five runs and took a wicket, but she struggled to impress in either of the final two ODIs, and was dropped from the side.

In January 2020, she was named in West Indies' squad for the 2020 ICC Women's T20 World Cup in Australia, after a gap of nearly twelve years since her last international match.
