= Trishan Holder =

Barbadian cricketer

Personal information
- Full name: Trishan Holder
- Born: 8 November 2003 (age 23); Barbados
- Batting: Right-handed
- Bowling: Right-arm medium
- Role: Batter

International information
- National sides: Barbados (2022); West Indies
- T20I debut (cap 5/45): 29 July 2022; Barbados v Pakistan
- Last T20I: 19 February 2023; West Indies v Pakistan

Domestic team information
- Years: Team
- 2022–present: Barbados
- 2023–present: Barbados Royals

Career statistics
Competition	WT20I	WLA	WT20
Matches	6	3	6
Runs scored	34	6	34
Batting average	6.80	6.00	6.80
100s/50s	0/0	0/0	0/0
Top score	21	6	21
Catches/stumpings	0/–	0/–	0/–
- Source: CricketArchive, 30 January 2023

Trishan Holder (born 8 November 2003) is a Barbadian cricketer who currently plays for Barbados and the West Indies. She plays as a right-handed batter.

== Domestic career ==
Holder made her debut for Barbados on 18 June 2022, against Jamaica in the Women's Super50 Cup. She went on to play three matches in the tournament as her side won the title.

== International career ==
In August 2022, Barbados competed in the cricket tournament at the Commonwealth Games as the representative of the West Indies, with their matches holding international status. Holder was named in Barbados' squad for the Games, and made her Twenty20 International debut in the side's first match of the competition, against Pakistan. She went on to play all three of the side's matches in the competition, scoring 6 runs in her two innings.

Holder played for the West Indies Under-19s team throughout 2022, as vice-captain, and was subsequently selected in the side's squad for the 2023 ICC Under-19 Women's T20 World Cup. She was ever-present for the side at the tournament, scoring 41 runs in her five innings.

On 11 December 2022, it was announced that Holder had been named in the West Indies squad for their T20I series against England. She made her debut for the West Indies in the third match of the series, on 17 December 2022, in which she scored 21 from 21 deliveries. She played a further two matches in the series, scoring 28 runs at an average of 9.33 overall. In February 2023, she played two matches for the West Indies at the 2023 ICC Women's T20 World Cup.
