= Cannings Foods Limited =

Trinidad and Tobago food company

Cannings Foods Limited was a Trinidad and Tobago company founded in 1912 by Ernest Canning, a British-born businessman.

The enterprise began as a grocery store. Later, it introduced dairy products, baked goods, poultry processing, and soft drinks.

Cannings acquired the Coca-Cola franchise for Trinidad in 1939. The supermarket HiLo, started in 1950, was the first self-service store in Trinidad and Tobago. Cannings was taken over by Neal and Massy in 1975.

In the 1990s, the Cannings Group ceased to operate, with the exception of the HiLo supermarket. The Cannings soft drink brand was sold to Coca-Cola, and continues to be produced.

Cannings, and its relationship with Coca-Cola, are treated in fictionalized (and renamed) fashion in V. S. Naipaul's 1967 novel The Mimic Men.
