= Massy Stores =

Supermarket chain in Trinidad and Tobago

- Company logo

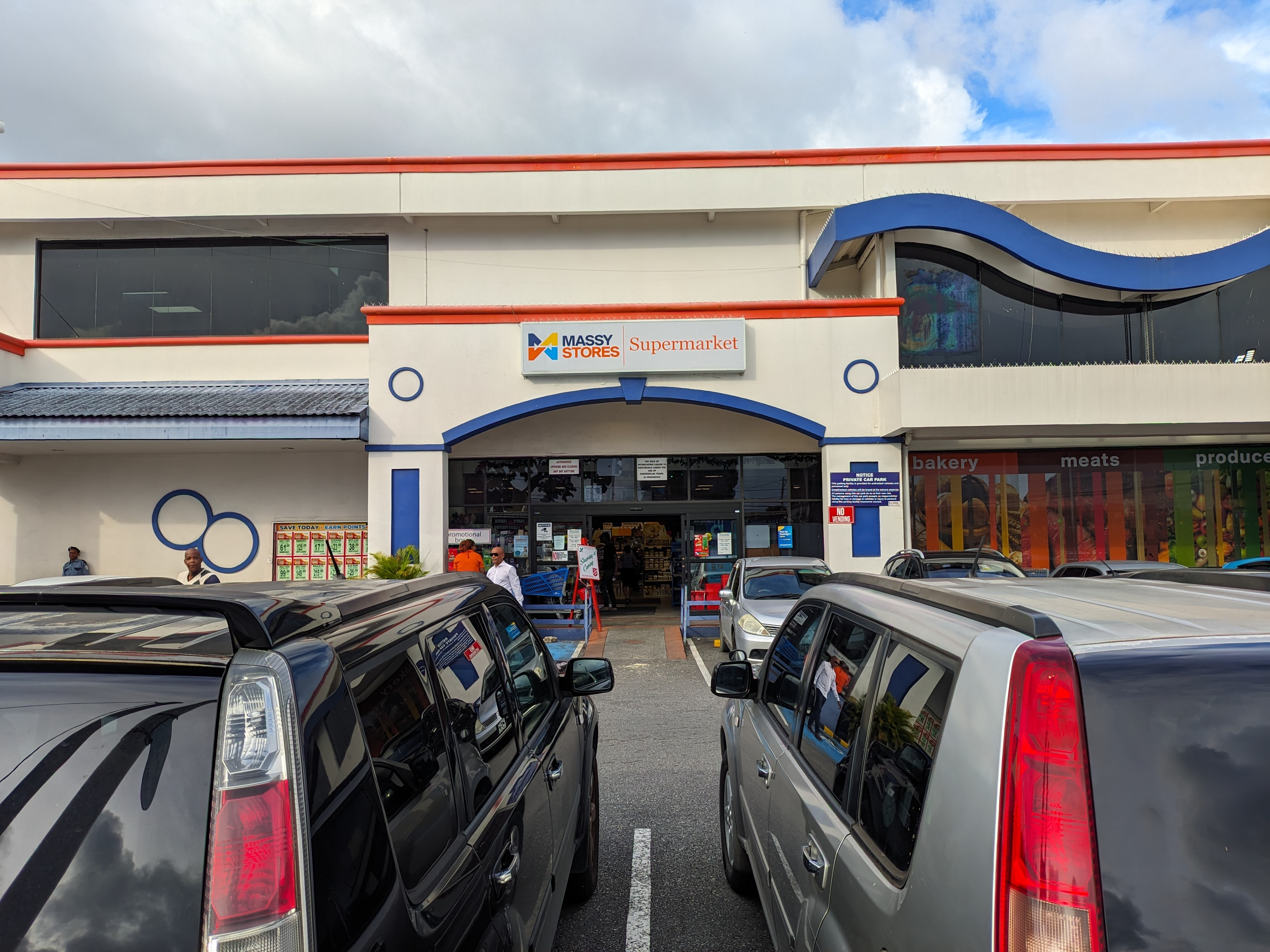
- Massy Stores on the Eastern Main Road in Curepe, Trinidad
- Company type: subsidiary
- Industry: Retail (Grocery)
- Headquarters: Trinidad and Tobago
- Website: https://www.massystores.com

Massy Stores (formerly Hi-Lo Foods Stores) is a nationwide supermarket chain in Trinidad and Tobago. It is a subsidiary of the Massy Group (formerly Neal & Massy) of companies and part of the IGA network. Originally opened by Cannings Foods Limited, Hi-Lo was rebranded as Massy Stores in 2014 as part of an effort to make consumers familiar with other businesses operating under the Massy Group.
