= Barbados Tridents (WCPL) =

West Indian women's cricket team

- Barbados Royals (2022–2025)

Personnel
- Captain: Hayley Matthews
- Coach: TBA
- Overseas players: Harleen Deol; Maddy Green; Suzie Bates; Pooja Vastrakar; Kiran Navgire

Team information
- Colours: Blue; Yellow
- Established: 2022
- Home ground: Kensington Oval
- Capacity: 11,000

History
- WCPL wins: 3 (2023, 2024, 2025)
- 6ixty wins: 1 (2022)
- Official website: www.barbadosroyals.com
T20I kit

Royals Group

Current Teams
- Rajasthan Royals (2008–present); 1 (2008); Barbados Tridents (2021–present); Barbados Tridents Women (2022–present); 3 (2023, 2024, 2025); Paarl Royals (2022–present)

The Barbados Tridents are a women's cricket team that compete in the Women's Caribbean Premier League and The 6ixty, representing Barbados. The formation of the team was announced in March 2022, aligned with the equivalent men's team, playing their first match in August 2022.

The team is captained by Hayley Matthews. The side won the inaugural edition of The 6ixty, and won their three Women's Caribbean Premier League title in 2023, 2024 and 2025.

== History ==
On 14 March 2022, Cricket West Indies announced their intention to hold the first Women's Caribbean Premier League, to run alongside the men's tournament, which began in 2013. Barbados Tridents were one of three teams announced to be taking part in the tournament, aligned with one of the men's teams. The team's squad was announced on 16 June 2022, with Hayley Matthews announced as captain of the team. The inaugural Women's Caribbean Premier League is scheduled to begin on 31 August 2022.

On 22 June 2022, it was announced that a T10 tournament would precede the Women's CPL, taking place from 24 to 28 August, known as The 6ixty and involving the three teams competing in the main tournament. The side won the inaugural edition of The 6ixty, qualifying second in the group stage before beating Trinbago Knight Riders in the final by 15 runs. The side finished second in the initial group stage of the inaugural Women's Caribbean Premier League, before losing to Trinbago Knight Riders in the final by 10 runs. However, they went on to win the Women's Caribbean Premier League in 2023, topping the group stage before beating Guyana Amazon Warriors in the final. in 2024, in the final Barbados Royals defeating Trinbago Knight Riders by 4 wickets win to their second consecutive title. in 2025, Barbados Royals defeated Guyana Amazon Warriors by 3 wickets in the final to win their 3rd consecutive title.

== Current squad ==
As per 2026 season.

- Players in **bold** have international caps.

No.	Name	Nationality	Birth date	Batting style	Bowling style	Notes
Batters
–	Qiana Joseph	West Indies	22 January 2001 (age 25)	Left-handed	Left-arm orthodox	
–	Shabika Gajnabi	West Indies	14 July 2000 (age 26)	Right-handed	Right-arm medium	
–	Maddy Green	New Zealand	20 October 1992 (age 33)	Right-handed	Right-arm off break	Overseas player
–	Kiran Navgire	India	18 September 1994 (age 31)	Right-handed	Off break	Overseas player
–	Asabi Callender	West Indies	21 November 2005 (age 20)	Right-handed	Right-arm medium	
All-rounders
–	Hayley Matthews	West Indies	19 March 1998 (age 28)	Right-handed	Right-arm off break	Captain
–	Mandy Mangru	West Indies	22 September 1999 (age 26)	Right-handed	Right-arm off break	
–	Naijanni Cumberbatch	West Indies	30 August 2007 (age 19)	Right-handed	Off break	
–	Pooja Vastrakar	India	25 September 1999 (age 26)	Right-handed	Right-arm medium-fast	Overseas player
–	Suzie Bates	New Zealand	16 September 1987 (age 39)	Right-handed	Right-arm medium	Overseas player
Wicket-keepers
–	Mandy Mangru	West Indies	22 September 1999 (age 26)	Right-handed	Right-arm off break	
Bowlers
–	Afy Fletcher	West Indies	17 March 1987 (age 39)	Right-handed	Right-arm leg break	
–	Cherry-Ann Fraser	West Indies	21 July 1999 (age 27)	Left-handed	Right-arm fast-medium	
–	Shawnisha Hector	West Indies	7 October 1999 (age 26)	Right-handed	Right-arm medium	
–	Amrita Ramtahal	West Indies	27 June 2005 (age 21)	Left-handed	Right-arm medium-fast	

== Seasons ==
=== Women's Caribbean Premier League ===
==== Tournament finishes ====
Year	League standing	Final standing
2022	2nd out of 3	Runners-up
2023	1st out of 3	Champions
2024	1st out of 3	Champions
2025	1st out of 3	Champions
2026	3rd out of 4	Semi finalists

- C: Champions
- RU: Runner-up
- SF: Team qualified for the semi-final stage of the competition

=== Summaries ===
Season	League standings								Final Position
Season	P	W	L	T	A/C	NRR	Pts	Pos	Final Position
2022	2	1	1	0	0	+0.188	2	2nd	Runners-up
2023	4	3	1	0	0	+0.977	6	1st	Champions
2024	4	3	1	0	0	+0.454	6	1st	Champions
2025	4	4	0	0	0	+0.999	8	1st	Champions

=== The 6ixty ===
Season	League standings								Final Position
Season	P	W	L	T	A/C	NRR	Pts	Pos	Final Position
2022	4	2	2	0	0	+0.075	4	2nd	Champions

== See also ==
- Barbados Tridents
- Barbados women's national cricket team
