= Chloe Tryon =

South African cricketer (born 1994)

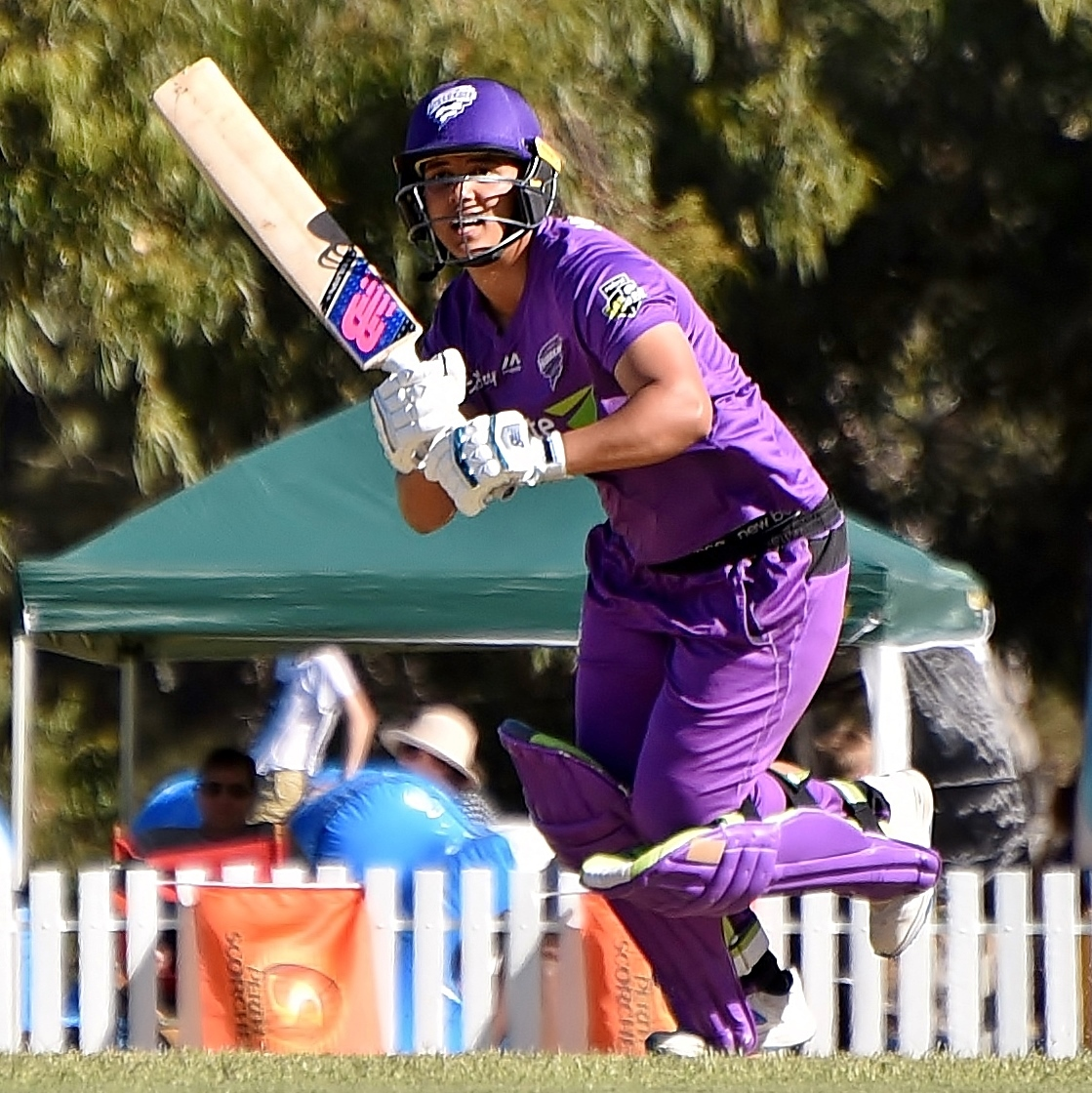
- Tryon batting for the Hobart Hurricanes in 2019

Personal information
- Full name: Chloe-Lesleigh Tryon
- Born: 25 January 1994 (age 32); Durban, South Africa
- Height: 173 cm (5 ft 8 in)
- Batting: Right-handed
- Bowling: Slow left-arm orthodox
- Role: All-rounder

International information
- National side: South Africa (2010–present)
- Test debut (cap 56): 16 November 2014 v India
- Last Test: 15 February 2024 v Australia
- ODI debut (cap 60): 21 October 2011 v England
- Last ODI: 2 November 2025 v India
- ODI shirt no.: 25
- T20I debut (cap 22): 5 May 2010 v West Indies
- Last T20I: 27 November 2024 v England
- T20I shirt no.: 25

Domestic team information
- Years: Team
- 2006/07–2022/23: KwaZulu-Natal Coastal
- 2019/20–2020/21: Hobart Hurricanes
- 2021: London Spirit
- 2022: Barbados Royals
- 2022/23: Sydney Thunder
- 2023–present: Mumbai Indians
- 2023: Northern Diamonds
- 2023–present: Southern Brave
- 2023/24–present: Central Gauteng
- 2023/24–present: Sydney Sixers

Career statistics
Competition	WTest	WODI	WT20I
Matches	2	103	109
Runs scored	99	1,806	1,253
Batting average	33.00	25.43	20.20
100s/50s	0/1	0/11	0/1
Top score	64	92	57*
Balls bowled	242	2,675	1,212
Wickets	4	46	39
Bowling average	34.00	41.43	35.05
5 wickets in innings	0	0	0
10 wickets in match	0	0	0
Best bowling	3/81	2/10	4/15
Catches/stumpings	0/–	34/–	26/–
Medal record
Women's cricket
Representing South Africa
ICC Cricket World Cup
Runner-up	2025 India
ICC T20 World Cup
Runner-up	2023 South Africa
Runner-up	2024 UAE
- Source: ESPNcricinfo, 28 November 2024

Chloe-Lesleigh Tryon (born 25 January 1994) is a South African cricketer. She has appeared for South Africa in all formats of the game.

== Career ==
On her debut for South Africa, a Twenty20 International against West Indies in the 2010 Women's World Twenty20, she claimed two wickets in her first over, one with her first delivery, becoming the first cricketer to take a wicket with the first ball of her career in WT20I history. She along with Suné Luus set the record for the highest ever 6th wicket partnership in the history of WODI (142 runs).

In March 2018, she was one of fourteen players to be awarded a national contract by Cricket South Africa ahead of the 2018–19 season. In October 2018, she was named in South Africa's squad for the 2018 ICC Women's World Twenty20 tournament in the West Indies. Ahead of the tournament, she was named as one of the players to watch. She played in her 50th WT20I for South Africa during the group stage of the tournament.

In September 2019, she was named in the Terblanche XI squad for the inaugural edition of the Women's T20 Super League in South Africa. In January 2020, she was named as the vice-captain of South Africa's squad for the 2020 ICC Women's T20 World Cup in Australia. On 23 July 2020, Tyron was named in South Africa's 24-woman squad to begin training in Pretoria, ahead of their tour to England. In July 2021, she was drafted by London Spirit for the inaugural season of The Hundred.

In February 2022, she was named as the vice-captain of South Africa's team for the 2022 Women's Cricket World Cup in New Zealand. In July 2022, she was named in South Africa's team for the cricket tournament at the 2022 Commonwealth Games in Birmingham, England. In August 2022, she was signed as an overseas player for Barbados Royals for the inaugural edition of the Women's Caribbean Premier League. In April 2023, it was announced that she had signed as an overseas player for Northern Diamonds from April to July 2023.

She was named in the South Africa squad for the 2024 ICC Women's T20 World Cup and for their multi-format home series against England in November 2024.

During the Tri-Nation Series, Tryon took her maiden hat-trick and five-wicket haul in ODIs, against Sri Lanka, on 9 May 2025.
