= Shikha Pandey =

Indian cricketer (born 1989)

Squadron Leader Shikha Pandey
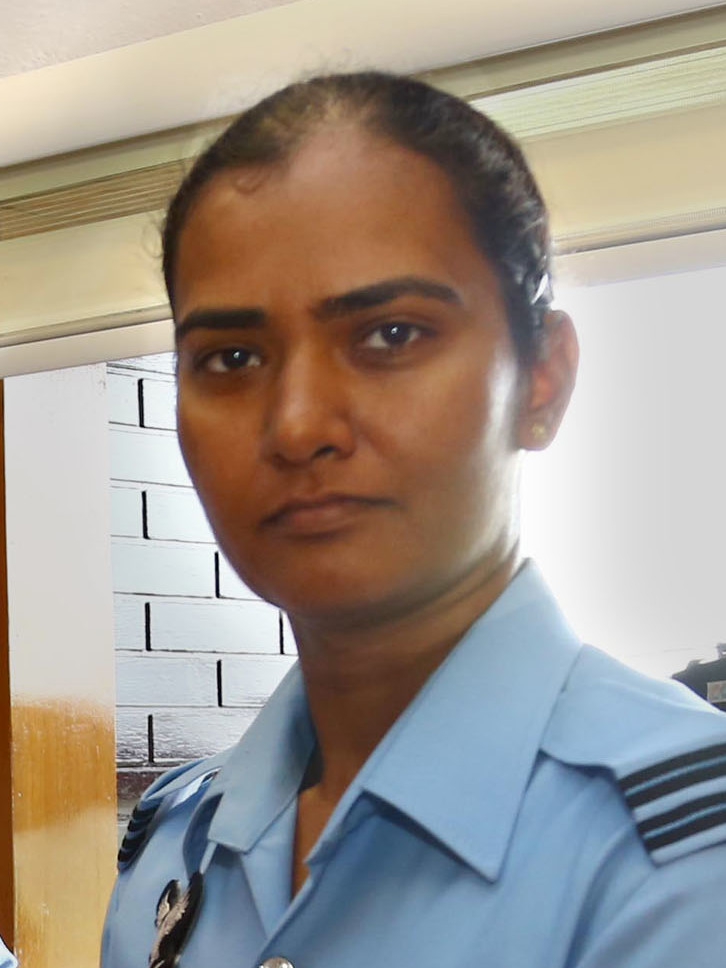
- Pandey in 2017

Personal information
- Full name: Shikha Subas Pandey
- Born: 12 May 1989 (age 37); Ramagundam, Andhra Pradesh, India (present-day Telangana, India)
- Nickname: Shikhipedia
- Batting: Right-handed
- Bowling: Right-arm medium
- Role: All-rounder

International information
- National side: India (2014–2023)
- Test debut (cap 78): 13 August 2014 v England
- Last Test: 16 June 2021 v England
- ODI debut (cap 112): 21 August 2014 v England
- Last ODI: 3 July 2021 v England
- ODI shirt no.: 12
- T20I debut (cap 48): 9 March 2014 v Bangladesh
- Last T20I: 23 February 2023 v Australia
- T20I shirt no.: 12

Domestic team information
- Years: Team
- 2007/08–present: Goa
- 2019–2020: Velocity
- 2023–present: Delhi Capitals
- 2024: Trinbago Knight Riders
- 2024/25: Brisbane Heat
- 2024/25: Canterbury Magicians

Career statistics
Competition	WTest	WODI	WT20I
Matches	3	55	56
Runs scored	55	512	207
Batting average	18.33	20.48	12.93
100s/50s	0/0	0/2	0/0
Top score	28*	59	26*
Balls bowled	249	2,472	938
Wickets	4	75	40
Bowling average	35.25	21.92	25.32
5 wickets in innings	0	0	0
10 wickets in match	0	0	0
Best bowling	2/33	4/18	3/14
Catches/stumpings	1/–	11/-	18/-
- Source: ESPNcricinfo, 23 February 2023
- Military career
- Alma mater: Goa Engineering College
- Allegiance: India
- Branch: Indian Air Force
- Service years: 2011–present
- Rank: Squadron Leader

Squadron Leader Shikha Pandey (born 12 May 1989) is an Indian cricketer and former officer in the Indian Air Force. She plays for the national cricket team as a right-arm medium pacer and middle-order batter, and was an IAF air traffic control officer.

Pandey made her international Twenty20 (T20I) debut on 9 March 2014 against Bangladesh at Cox's Bazar cricket stadium in Bangladesh. In August of the same year, she made her One Day International (ODI) and Test debuts against England at Wormsley and Scarborough, respectively.

== Early life ==
Pandey did her schooling under the Central Board of Secondary Education, India. At the age of 15, she became the first player affiliated with state board to represent India. Within months of this affiliation and getting introduced into the formal set-up, Surekha Bhandare, former Mumbai player and selector, saw her playing and believed that Pandey had all the markings of a future India player. "The raw talent in her was hard to go unnotice [sic]," Bhandare was quoted as stating. In the class-ten board (secondary school) exams, she won the state-wide third rank. It was then that she decided to focus more on studies and cricket took a back seat for the next three years. It was not before her second year as an undergraduate in Electronics and Electrical Engineering that she began pursuing the sport with serious intent.

Academics played an important part where Pandey and had to juggle cricket and college, where she would spend her morning doing gym sessions and academic work, and her afternoons would include a 12 km journey to Mapusa so she could train under Nitin Vernekar, former Goa cricketer and Sports Authority of Goa coach. This phase was crucial to her growth as a cricketer as being the only girl at the boy's facility facing U-16 and U-19 boys honed her reaction time against pace bowling.

However, she did not let her focus on game affect her academic performance. She particularly credits Ujwala Phadte, her lecturer in Applied Mathematics for helping her throughout this phase and making sure her grades were not inversely proportional to her on-field performance.

After completing her engineering degree from Goa College of Engineering in 2010, three multinational companies offered her opportunities, but she declined all these placement offers and decided to take a year off and focus on her cricketing career completely. In July 2011, she joined Indian Air Force, and in June 2012 was commissioned as an air traffic controller. At the time of the 2020 ICC Women's T20 World Cup, she held the rank of Squadron Leader.

== Cricket career ==
At the age of 15, Pandey was selected to play for Goa in 2004. Later at the age of 17 for the 2007–08 domestic season, she was selected to play for Goa's Women Senior State Side. In the inter-state two-day tournament, Rani Jhansi Trophy, she picked up a four-wicket haul. This was also her Goa senior women's debut. Thirushi Kamini, then already an Indian international, was her first wicket which was a caught-and-bowled. What fast-tracked her selection into the zonal squad the same season was her scoring three half-centuries for the Goa Under-19 side.

In her year off from her engineering course and Pandey played in Board President's XI against the visiting England and West Indies teams in 2010 and January 2011 respectively and also took her first "international wicket, albeit unofficial," Charlotte Edwards in the 2010 tour game. She continued to play for Goa and after 2013–14 season of Inter-State T20 tournament (Plate group) she was selected for India's tour of Bangladesh consisting of 3 friendly matches with Bangladesh and 2014 ICC Women's World Twenty20.

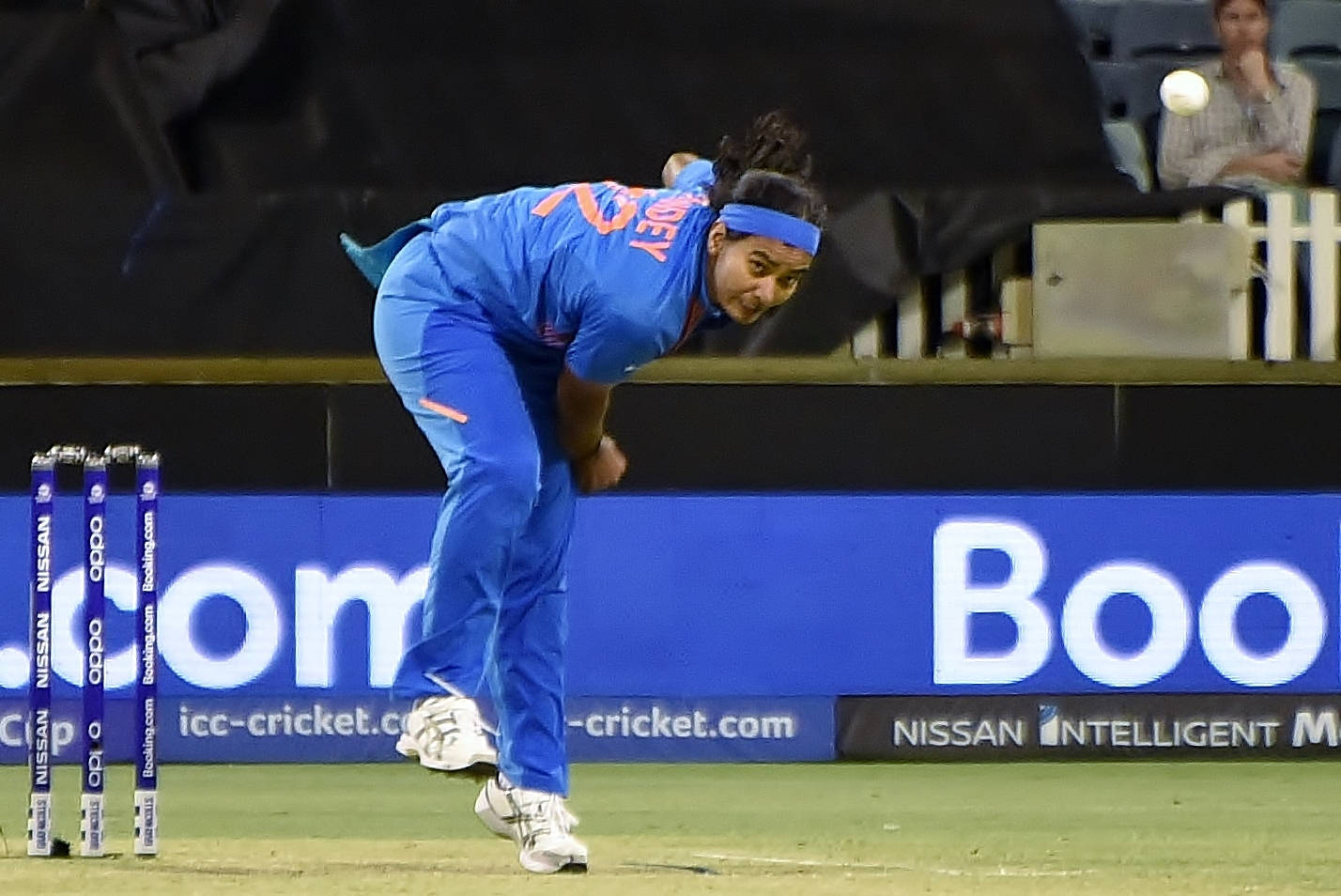
Pandey bowling for India during the 2020 ICC Women's T20 World Cup

After Dilip Sardesai, Pandey is the first player from Goa to play for any Indian national team. She is also the first Goa Cricket Association affiliated cricketer to play international level cricket for India. After the T20 World Cup, she played one-off Test match and 2 ODI matches against England. She was instrumental in India's win against South Africa on 26 November 2014. She took 3 wickets and scored 59 runs.

Pandey was part of the Indian team to reach the final of the 2017 Women's Cricket World Cup where the team lost to England by nine runs. In January 2020, she was named in India's squad for the 2020 ICC Women's T20 World Cup in Australia. In May 2021, she was named in India's Test squad for their one-off match against the England women's cricket team.

== Personal life ==
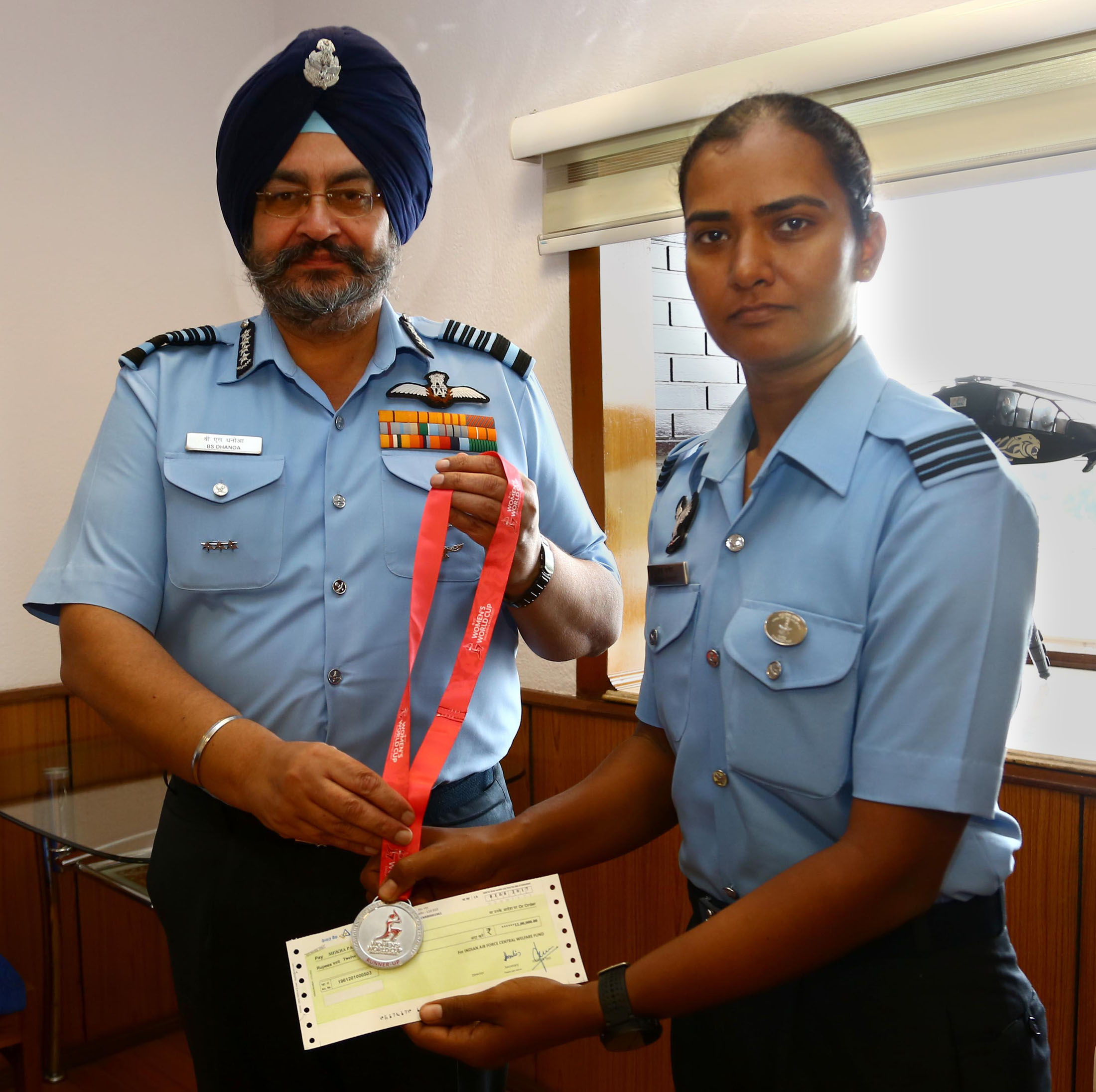
The Chief of the Air Staff, Air Chief Marshal B.S. Dhanoa felicitating the then Flt. Lt. Shikha Pandey in New Delhi on 1 August 2017

Pandey's nickname is "Shikhipedia", an allusion to her self-confessed status as a "cricket geek".
