= Chinelle Henry =

West Indian cricketer (born 1995)

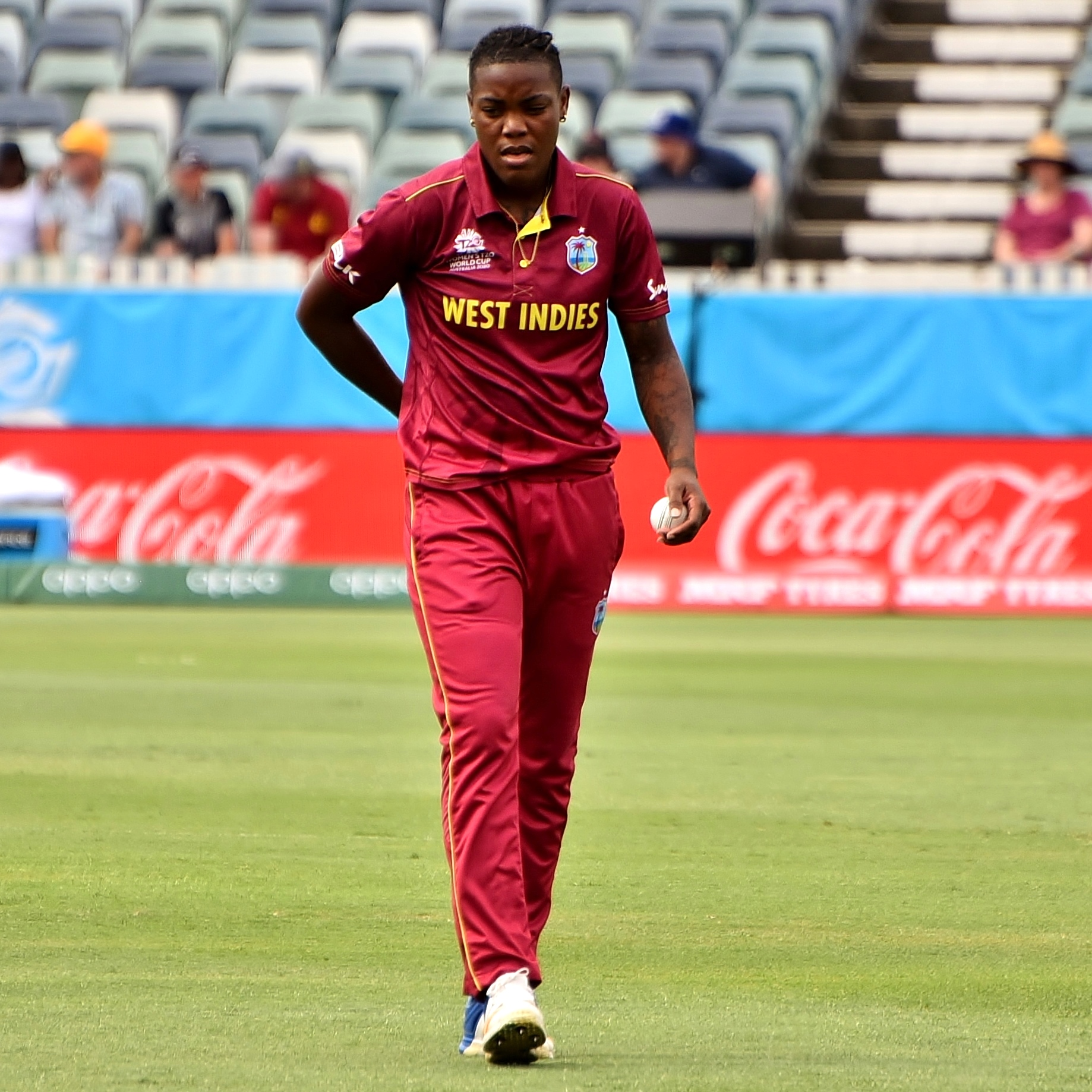
- Henry playing for the West Indies during the 2020 ICC Women's T20 World Cup

Personal information
- Full name: Chinelle Akhalia Henry
- Born: 17 August 1995 (age 31); Jamaica
- Batting: Right-handed
- Bowling: Right-arm medium-fast
- Role: All-rounder

International information
- National side: West Indies (2013–present)
- ODI debut (cap 78): 24 February 2014 v New Zealand
- Last ODI: 21 June 2024 v Sri Lanka
- T20I debut (cap 31): 24 October 2013 v England
- Last T20I: 18 October 2024 v New Zealand
- T20I shirt no.: 48

Domestic team information
- Years: Team
- 2009–present: Jamaica
- 2022–present: Barbados Royals
- 2024/25-2025/26: Brisbane Heat
- 2025: UP Warriorz
- 2026: Delhi Capitals
- 2026/27-present: Hobart Hurricanes

Career statistics
Competition	WODI	WT20I
Matches	48	59
Runs scored	498	423
Batting average	13.10	14.10
100s/50s	0/2	0/0
Top score	53*	34
Balls bowled	1,382	595
Wickets	32	19
Bowling average	36.78	35.21
5 wickets in innings	0	0
10 wickets in match	0	0
Best bowling	3/19	3/26
Catches/stumpings	20/–	32/–
- Source: ESPNCricinfo, 19 October 2024

Chinelle Akhalia Henry (born 17 August 1995) is a Jamaican cricketer who plays as a right-arm medium-fast bowler and right-handed batter. In October 2018, she was named in the West Indies' squad for the 2018 ICC Women's World Twenty20 tournament in the West Indies. In July 2019, Cricket West Indies awarded her with a central contract for the first time, ahead of the 2019–20 season. In January 2020, she was named in West Indies' squad for the 2020 ICC Women's T20 World Cup in Australia. In May 2021, Henry was awarded with a central contract from Cricket West Indies. She plays domestic cricket for Jamaica and Barbados Royals.

On 2 July 2021, she and her teammate Chedean Nation had collapsed on the field in a space of ten minutes during the second women's T20I match between West Indies and Pakistan at the Coolidge Cricket Ground in Antigua. Both of them were immediately taken to the hospital and they were reportedly in conscious and stable position.

In October 2021, she was named in the West Indies team for the 2021 Women's Cricket World Cup Qualifier tournament in Zimbabwe. In February 2022, she was named in the West Indies team for the 2022 Women's Cricket World Cup in New Zealand.

She was named in the West Indies squad for the 2024 ICC Women's T20 World Cup.

Henry was part of the West Indies squad for the 2025 Women's Cricket World Cup Qualifier held in Pakistan in April 2025.
