= Cherry-Ann Fraser =

West Indian cricketer

Personal information
- Full name: Cherry-Ann Sarah Fraser
- Born: 21 July 1999 (age 27); Georgetown, Guyana
- Batting: Left-handed
- Bowling: Right-arm medium-fast
- Role: All-rounder

International information
- National side: West Indies (2020–present)
- ODI debut (cap 94): 16 September 2021 v South Africa
- Last ODI: 14 October 2023 v Australia
- T20I debut (cap 41): 30 September 2020 v England
- Last T20I: 22 December 2022 v England

Domestic team information
- Years: Team
- 2018–present: Guyana
- 2022–present: Guyana Amazon Warriors

Career statistics
| Competition | WT20I |
|---|---|
| Matches | 1 |
| Runs scored | – |
| Batting average | – |
| 100s/50s | –/– |
| Top score | – |
| Balls bowled | – |
| Wickets | – |
| Bowling average | – |
| 5 wickets in innings | – |
| 10 wickets in match | – |
| Best bowling | – |
| Catches/stumpings | 0/– |
- Source: Cricinfo, 25 January 2023

Cherry-Ann Sarah Fraser (born 21 July 1999) is a Guyanese cricketer who currently plays for Guyana, Guyana Amazon Warriors and the West Indies. Fraser has also represented Guyana in volleyball, playing in the 2019 Inter-Guianas championship.

== Early years ==
Fraser began playing cricket when she was 10, playing for St. Agnes Primary, and in the neighborhood she grew up in Cummings Lodge. She played as an all-rounder in the softball arena, on the team Mike's Wellwoman, until accepting an invitation for hardball at the inter-county level.

== Career ==
In November 2019, Fraser was added to the West Indies Women's Twenty20 International (WT20I) squad for their series against India, replacing their captain, Stafanie Taylor, who had been ruled out of the tour due to an injury. In January 2020, she was selected in the West Indies' squad for the 2020 ICC Women's T20 World Cup. Fraser was born in Guyana, and played for the Guyana Under-19 female cricket team.

In August 2020, she was named in the West Indies' squad for the WT20I series against England. She made her WT20I debut for the West Indies, against England, on 30 September 2020. In May 2021, Fraser was awarded with a central contract from Cricket West Indies.

In June 2021, Fraser was named in the West Indies A Team for their series against Pakistan.

In September 2021, Fraser was added to the West Indies Women's One Day International (WODI) ahead of their fourth match against South Africa. She made her WODI debut on 16 September 2021, for the West Indies against South Africa.

In October 2021, she was named as one of three reserve players in the West Indies team for the 2021 Women's Cricket World Cup Qualifier tournament in Zimbabwe. In February 2022, she was named in the West Indies team for the 2022 Women's Cricket World Cup in New Zealand.

Fraser was part of the West Indies squad for the 2025 Women's Cricket World Cup Qualifier in Pakistan in April 2025.
