= Jacqueline Williams =

Jamaican cricket umpire (born 1976)

Personal information
- Full name: Jacqueline Monique Williams
- Born: 4 March 1976 (age 50); Ashton, Westmoreland, Jamaica
- Role: Umpire

Umpiring information
- ODIs umpired: 5 (2019)
- T20Is umpired: 19 (2019–2023)
- WODIs umpired: 48 (2015–2026)
- WT20Is umpired: 86 (2015–2026)
- Source: ESPNcricinfo, 26 February 2023

Jacqueline Williams (born 4 March 1976) is a Jamaican cricket umpire. She has officiated in the 2015 ICC Women's World Twenty20 Qualifier tournament.

She became the first female umpire to stand in the domestic 50-over competition in the West Indies, when she was one of the on-field umpires in the match between Trinidad & Tobago and ICC Americas in the 2015–16 Regional Super50 tournament. On 14 December 2023, she became the first female umpire from the West Indies to stand in a men's T20I involving two Full-Member teams.

== Career ==
Williams stood as an umpire in the 2015 ICC Women's World Twenty20 Qualifier tournament. In 2016, she became the first female umpire to stand in the domestic 50-over competition in the West Indies, when she was one of the on-field umpires between Trinidad & Tobago and ICC Americas in the 2015–16 Regional Super50 tournament.

During the 2016 ICC World Cricket League Division Five tournament in Jersey, she was the third umpire during the fixture between Oman and Nigeria on 22 May. Her colleague, Sue Redfern, was one of the on-field umpires, making it the first time that two female umpires had officiated in a men's match in an ICC tournament.

In October 2016 she was selected as one of the eight umpires to stand in matches in the 2016 ICC World Cricket League Division Four tournament. In January 2017, she was one of four female umpires named by the ICC to stand in matches in the 2017 Women's Cricket World Cup Qualifier. In October 2018, she was named as one of the twelve on-field umpires for the 2018 ICC Women's World Twenty20. In May 2019, the International Cricket Council named her as one of the eight women on the ICC Development Panel of Umpires.

She stood in her first Twenty20 International (T20I) match, between Canada and the Cayman Islands in the Regional Finals of the 2018–19 ICC T20 World Cup Americas Qualifier tournament on 18 August 2019. Later the same month, she was named as one of the umpires to officiate in matches during the 2019 ICC Women's World Twenty20 Qualifier tournament in Scotland. She stood in her first One Day International (ODI) match, between the United States and Papua New Guinea in the 2019 United States Tri-Nation Series on 13 September 2019. In January 2020, Williams was named as the third umpire for the first T20I between the West Indies and Ireland, becoming the first woman to officiate as a third umpire in a men's international cricket match.

In February 2020, the ICC named her as one of the umpires to officiate in matches during the 2020 ICC Women's T20 World Cup in Australia. In January 2022, she was named as one of the on-field umpires for the 2022 ICC Under-19 Cricket World Cup in the West Indies. She became the first female umpire to officiate on-field during the Under-19 Cricket World Cup, and was the fourth umpire for the final of the tournament.

In February 2022, she was named as one of the on-field umpires for the 2022 Women's Cricket World Cup in New Zealand.

In September 2024 she was named as part of an all-female officiating group for the 2024 ICC Women's T20 World Cup.

== See also ==
- List of One Day International cricket umpires
- List of Twenty20 International cricket umpires
