= Trinbago Knight Riders (WCPL) =

West Indian women's cricket team

- Nickname: Knights
- League: Women's Caribbean Premier League

Personnel
- Captain: Deandra Dottin
- Coach: Robert Samuels

Team information
- Colours: Red and Black
- Established: 2022
- Home ground: Queen's Park Oval

History
- WCPL wins: 1 (2022)
- 6ixty wins: 0

The Trinbago Knight Riders are a women's cricket team that compete in the Women's Caribbean Premier League and The 6ixty, representing Trinidad and Tobago. The formation of the team was announced in March 2022, aligned with the equivalent men's team, playing their first match in August 2022. The franchise is owned by the Knight Riders Group, a sporting subsidiary alliance between the Red Chillies Entertainment and the Mehta Group, which also owns the Trinbago Knight Riders (Men's) team in the Caribbean Premier League.

The team is captained by Deandra Dottin. The side won the inaugural Women's Caribbean Premier League, beating Barbados Royals in the final.

== History ==
On 14 March 2022, Cricket West Indies announced their intention to hold the first Women's Caribbean Premier League, to run alongside the men's tournament, which began in 2013. Trinbago Knight Riders were one of three teams announced to be taking part in the tournament, aligned with one of the men's teams. The team's squad was announced on 16 June 2022, with Deandra Dottin announced as captain of the team. The inaugural Women's Caribbean Premier League is scheduled to begin on 31 August 2022.

On 22 June 2022, it was announced that a T10 tournament would precede the Women's CPL, taking place from 24 to 28 August, known as The 6ixty and involving the three teams competing in the main tournament. The side topped the initial group stage in the inaugural edition of The 6ixty, but lost to Barbados Royals in the final by 15 runs. In the inaugural Women's Caribbean Premier League, the side topped the initial group stage before beating Barbados Royals in the final by 10 runs to win the competition. The side finished bottom of the group in the 2023 Women's Caribbean Premier League.

== Current squad ==
As per 2024 season. Players in bold have international caps.

No.	Name	Nationality	Birth date	Batting style	Bowling style	Notes
Batters
47	**Kyshona Knight**	West Indies	19 February 1992 (age 34)	Left-handed	Right-arm medium	
–	**Britney Cooper**	West Indies	23 August 1989 (age 37)	Right-handed	Right-arm fast-medium	
–	**Mignon du Preez**	South Africa	13 June 1989 (age 37)	Right-handed	–	Overseas player
–	Marie Kelly	England	9 February 1996 (age 30)	Right-handed	Right-arm off break	Overseas player
All-rounders
5	**Deandra Dottin**	West Indies	21 June 1991 (age 35)	Right-handed	Right-arm medium	Captain
–	**Zaida James**	West Indies	Unknown	Left-handed	Left-arm medium	
–	**Orla Prendergast**	Ireland	1 June 2002 (age 24)	Right-handed	Right-arm medium	Overseas player
–	Samara Ramnath	West Indies	Unknown	Right-handed	Right-arm medium	
Wicket-keepers
42	**Kycia Knight**	West Indies	19 February 1992 (age 34)	Right-handed	–	
–	Shunelle Sawh	West Indies	17 July 2004 (age 22)	Right-handed	–	
Bowlers
13	**Lee-Ann Kirby**	West Indies	7 April 1987 (age 39)	Right-handed	Right-arm medium	
14	**Anisa Mohammed**	West Indies	7 August 1988 (age 38)	Right-handed	Right-arm off break	Vice-captain
–	**Shamilia Connell**	West Indies	14 July 1992 (age 34)	Right-handed	Right-arm medium	
–	**Fran Jonas**	New Zealand	8 April 2004 (age 22)	Right-handed	Slow left-arm orthodox	Overseas player
–	Carena Noel	West Indies	25 September 1994 (age 31)	Right-handed	Left-arm off break	

== Seasons ==
=== Women's Caribbean Premier League ===
Season	League standings								Final Position
Season	P	W	L	T	A/C	NRR	Pts	Pos	Final Position
2022	2	1	0	0	1	+0.050	3	1st	Champions
2023	4	1	3	0	0	–0.421	2	3rd	League stage
2024	4	2	2	0	0	-0.518	4	2nd	Runners-up

=== The 6ixty ===
Season	League standings								Final Position
Season	P	W	L	T	A/C	NRR	Pts	Pos	Final Position
2022	4	2	2	0	0	+0.914	4	1st	Runners-up

== Knight Riders Group ==
Knight Riders Group also include the following teams in various T-20 format leagues and championships:-

- Trinbago Knight Riders (Men's)
- Kolkata Knight Riders
- Abu Dhabi Knight Riders
- Los Angeles Knight Riders

Knight Riders Group

Current Teams
- Kolkata Knight Riders (2008–present) 🏆×3 (2012, 2014, 2024); Trinbago Knight Riders (2015–present) 🏆×5 (2015, 2017, 2018, 2020, 2025); Trinbago Knight Riders Women (2022–present) 🏆×1 (2022); Abu Dhabi Knight Riders (2023–present); Los Angeles Knight Riders (2023–present) 🏆×1 (2026)

Stadium
- Knight Riders Cricket Ground (2026–present)

Defunct Teams
- Cape Town Knight Riders (2017)
