= Dorothy (given name) =

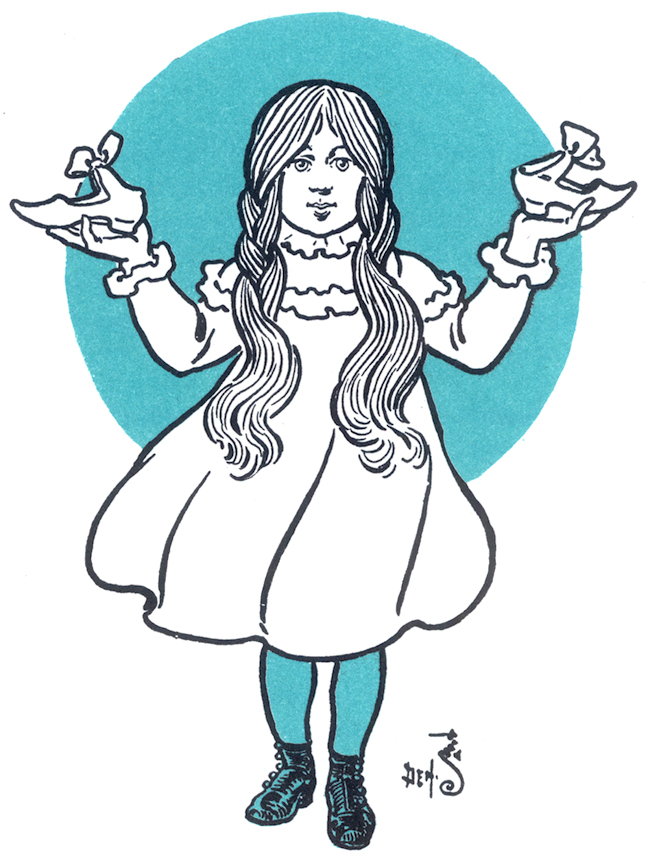
- Dorothy Gale is a character in L. Frank Baum's classic children's novel The Wonderful Wizard of Oz.
- Pronunciation: /ˈdɒrəθi/
- Gender: Female

Origin
- Origin: Greek
- Meaning: Gift of God

Other names
- Nicknames: Dodie, Dody, Doe, Dolly, Dora, Dori, Dorie, Doro, Dorrie, Dory, Dot, Dottie, Dotty, Thea, Tia
- Related names: Dorothea, Dorothee, Theodora, Theodore

Dorothy is a feminine given name. It is the English vernacular form of the Greek Δωροθέα (Dōrothéa) meaning 'God's gift', from δῶρον (dōron) 'gift' + θεός (theós) 'god'. It has been in use since the 15th century. Although much less common, there are also male equivalents in English such as Dory, from the Greek masculine Δωρόθεος (Dōrótheos). Dorofei is a rarely used Russian male version of the name. The given names Theodore and Theodora are derived from the same two Greek root words as Dorothy, albeit reversed in order.

The name grew in use among Christians due to popular legends surrounding Saint Dorothy of Caeserea. The name was at one time viewed as the English equivalent of the etymologically unrelated Russian name Daria or its diminutive Dasha.

Traditional English diminutives include, among others, Do, Dodi, Dodie, Doe, Doll, Dolley, Dollie, Dolly, Dora, Dori, Dorie, Doro, Dory, Dot, Dottie, Dotty, Tea, Thea, and Tia. Dorothy, with the nickname Doll or Dolly, was quite popular from 1450 to 1570 in England. Dorothy or the variant Dorothea, also with the nicknames Doll or Dolly, was also well used between 1750 and 1820.

There are also many variants of the name in other languages.

Dorothy was a less common variant of Dorothea until it became more common and one of the top 10 most popular names for girls in the United States between 1904 and 1940. The name remained among the top 100 most popular names for American girls until 1961. It briefly left the top 1,000 names for girls in the United States in 2007 but returned in 2011 and has since increased in popularity. In 2023, it ranked 466th among the most used names for newborn girls in the United States, with 658 girls given the name in that year. Variant Dorothea is in occasional use in the United States, where 61 girls were given the name in 2023.

== Notable people ==
=== Arts, entertainments and writers ===
- Dorothy Abbott (1920–1968), American actress
- Dorothy Adams (1900–1988), American actress
- Dorothy Aldis (1896–1966), American writer and author
- Dorothy Alison (1925–1992), Australian actress
- Dorothy Allen (1896–1970), American actress
- Dorothy Allison (1949–2024), American writer
- Dorothy Amenuke, Ghanaian sculptor
- Dorothy Angus (1891–1979), Scottish embroidery artist
- Dorothy Annan (1900–1983), Brazilian-British painter, potter and muralist
- Dorothy Appleby (1906–1990), American actress
- Dorothy Arnold (1917–1984), American actress
- Dorothy Arzner (1897–1979), American film director and film editor
- Dorothy Ashby (1932–1986), American jazz harpist and composer
- Dorothy A. Atabong, Cameroonian-Canadian actress
- Dorothy Atkinson, English actress and singer
- Dorothy Bar-Adon (1907–1950), American-born Israeli journalist
- Dorothy Gill Barnes (1927–2020), American artist
- Dorothy Barresi (born 1957), American poet
- Dorothy Bartlam (1907–1991), English actress
- Dorothy Batley (1902–1983), British actor
- Dorothy Bellew (1891–1973), English actress
- Dorothy Bennett (1907–1988), American screenwriter
- Dorothy Bernard (1890–1955), American actress
- Dorothy Berry (born 1942), Australian female artist
- Dorothy Bishop, American singer
- Dorothy Blackham (1896–1975), Irish illustrator, artist and teacher
- Dorothy Blewett, Australian playwright and novelist
- Dorothy Block (1904–1984), American painter
- Dorothy Bonarjee (1894–1983), Indian poet and artist
- Dorothy Bond (c. 1921–1952), English soprano
- Dorothy Bordass, British artist
- Dorothy Stokes Bostwick (1899–2001), American artist
- Dorothy Boulger (1846–1923), British novelist
- Dorothy Bowers (1902–1948), British writer
- Dorothy Boyd (1907–1996), English actress
- Dorothy Braddell, British writer
- Dorothy Bramhall (1911–2004), British actress and former model
- Dorothy Brandon, British playwright
- Dorothy Braudy, American painter
- Dorothy Mary Braund (1926–2013), Australian artist
- Dorothy Brett (1883–1977), American painter
- Dorothy Bridges (1915–2009), American actress
- Dorothy Bromiley (1930–2024), British actress
- Dorothy Brunton (1890–1977), Australian singer and actress
- Dorothy Bryant (c. 1930–2017), American dramatist
- Dorothy Burgess (1907–1961), American actress
- Dorothy Burroughes, English painter
- Dorothy Bussy (1865–1960), English novelist and translator
- Dorothy Butler (1925–2015), children's book author
- Dorothy Byrne, American operatic mezzo-soprano
- Dorothy A. Cadman, English painter
- Dorothy Caldwell, Canadian artist
- Dorothy Cannell, English-American mystery writer
- Dorothy Carnegie (1912–1998), American writer
- Dorothy Carter (1935–2003), American musician
- Dorothy Caruso (1893–1955), American writer
- Dorothy Chan, American poet and author based in Eau Claire, Wisconsin
- Dorothy Christy/Christie (1906–1977), American actress
- Dorothy Claire (1920–1982), American singer
- Dorothy "Dodie" Clark (born 1995), British singer-songwriter and YouTuber
- Dorothy Love Coates (1928–2003), American gospel singer
- Dorothy Coburn (1905–1978), American actress
- Dorothy Coke (1897–1979), English artist
- Dorothy Collins (1926–1994), American singer
- Dorothy Comingore (1913–1971), American actress
- Dorothy Compton, American actress
- Dorothy Cooper (1911–2004), American screenwriter
- Dorothy Cottrell (1902–1957), Australian writer
- Dorothy Cowlin (1911–2010), British novelist, poet, newspaper columnist and article writer
- Dorothy M. Cray, British novelist
- Dorothy Cross, Irish artist
- Dorothy Cullman (1918–2009), American television producer
- Dorothy Cumming (1894–1983), American actress
- Dorothy Dalton (1893–1972), American actress
- Dorothy Dandridge (1922–1965), American actress
- Dorothy Dare (1911–1981), American actress
- Dorothy Davenport (1895–1977), American actress
- Dorothy Davies (1899–1987), New Zealand pianist and piano teacher
- Dorothy Davison (1889–1984), British medical artist and scientific illustrator
- Dorothy Dean (1932–1987), American actress
- Dorothy Dearing (1913–1965), American actress
- Dorothy DeBorba (1925–2010), American child actress
- Dorothy Dehner (1901–1994), American artist
- Dorothy Dell (1915–1934), American actress
- Dorothy Dene (1859–1899), English stage actress and artist's model
- Dorothy Devore (1899–1976), American actress
- Dorothy Dewhurst (1886–1959), English stage and film actress
- Dorothy Dickson (1893–1995), American actress
- Dorothy Dietrich (born 1948), American stage magician and escapologist
- Dorothy Cameron Disney (1903–1992), American advice columnist
- Dorothy Dittrich, Canadian playwright
- Dorothy Dix (1861–1951), American newspaper columnist
- Dorothy Djukulul (born 1942), Australian artist
- Dorothy Donegan (1922–1998), American jazz pianist and vocalist
- Dorothy Dorow (1930–2017), British classical soprano
- Dorothy Doughty, British sculptor and potter
- Dorothy Dow (1920–2005), American singer
- Dorothy Drain (1909–1996), Australian journalist
- Dorothy Draper (1889–1969), American interior decorator
- Dorothy Drew, American actress
- Dorothy Duffy, Irish actress
- Dorothy Dunbar (1902–1992), American actress
- Dorothy Duncan (1903–1957), American writer and artist
- Dorothy Dunckley (1890–1972), Australian make-up artist and actress
- Dorothy Dunnett (1923–2001), Scottish historical novelist
- Dorothy Dury, 17th-century Anglo-Irish writer
- Dorothy Dwan (1906–1981), American actress
- Dorothy Eagle, English editor
- Dorothy Eaton (1893–1968), American painter
- Dorothy Eden (1912–1982), New Zealand writer
- Dorothy Meigs Eidlitz (1891–1976), American photographer and patron of the arts
- Dorothy Eisner (1906–1984), American painter
- Dorothy Elias-Fahn, American voice actress
- Dorothy Ellis (1935–2018), American singer
- Dorothy Emmerson, American actress and singer
- Dorothy Fadiman (born 1939), American film director and producer
- Dorothy Faison, American painter
- Dorothy Fane (1889–1976), British actress
- Dorothy Farnum (1900–1970), American screenwriter
- Dorothy Fay (1915–2003), American actress
- Dorothy Fernando (1907–c. 1981), Sri Lankan author and illustrator
- Dorothy Fields (1904–1974), American librettist and lyricist
- Dorothy Follis (c. 1892–1923), American actress and soprano singer
- Dorothy Catherine Fontana (1939–2019), screenplay writer
- Dorothy Ford (1922–2010), American actress and model
- Dorothy Foster (1908–1981), Australian radio producer, comedy scriptwriter and actress
- Dorothy Fowler, New Zealand writer
- Dorothy Fratt (1923–2017), American painter
- Dorothy Freed (1919–2000), New Zealand author, composer and music historian
- Dorothy Frooks (1896–1997), American journalist
- Dorothy Gallagher (born 1935), American memoirist and biographer
- Dorothy Gambrell, American cartoonist
- Dorothy Garlock (1919–2018), American author
- Dorothy Gibson (1889–1946), American actress
- Dorothy Giles (1892–1960), writer
- Dorothy Gill (1891–1969), British opera singer and actress
- Dorothy Gillespie (1920–2012), American artist and illustrator
- Dorothy Gilman (1923–2012), American novelist
- Dorothy Gish (1898–1968), American actress
- Dorothy Kurgans Goldberg (1908–1988), American writer
- Dorothy Gould (1910–2000), American actress
- Dorothy Gow (1893–1982), English composer
- Dorothy Granger (1911–1995), American actress
- Dorothy Grant, Haida fashion designer
- Dorothy Grebenak (1913–1990), American artist
- Dorothy Greener (1917–1971) English-born American actress and comedian
- Dorothy Lake Gregory (1893–1975), American painter
- Dorothy Grider (1915–2012), American artist
- Dorothy Gulliver (1908–1997), American actress
- Dorothy Gurney (1858–1932), British hymn writer and poet
- Dorothy Hafner, American ceramist and glass artist
- Dorothy Hammond (1876–1950), English actress
- Dorothy Antoinette Handy (1930–2002), American musician and scholar
- Dorothy Joan Harris (born 1931), Canadian writer
- Dorothy Hart (1922–2004), American actress
- Dorothy Schurman Hawes (1905–1977), American writer
- Dorothy Hawksley, British artist
- Dorothy Hawtree (1902–1981), Australian model and actress
- Dorothy Heller (1917–2003, American painter
- Dorothy Helmrich (1889–1984), Australian mezzo-soprano and arts administrator
- Dorothy Henry (1925–2020), American cartoonist
- Dorothy Hepworth, British painter
- Dorothy Hewett (1923–2002), Australian feminist poet, playwright and novelist
- Dorothy J. Heydt (1942–2022), American novelist
- Dorothy Heyward (1890–1961), American dramatist
- Dorothy Hood (1918–2000), American painter
- Dorothy Hood (illustrator), American fashion illustrator
- Dorothy Howard, American folklorist
- Dorothy Howard (1929–2013), Canadian mezzo-soprano and voice teacher
- Dorothy Hutton (1889–1984), English painter, calligrapher and printmaker
- Dorothy Hyson (1914–1996), American actress
- Dorothy Iannone (1933–2022), American visual artist
- Dorothy James (1901–1982), American music educator and composer
- Dorothy Janis (1912–2010), American actress
- Dorothy Jardon (1883–1966), American singer
- Dorothy Jenkin (1892–1995), New Zealand artist and printmaker
- Dorothy Johnston (born 1948), Australian author
- Dorothy Johnstone (1892–1980), Scottish painter and watercolorist
- Dorothy Rieber Joralemon (1893–1987), American sculptor
- Dorothy Jordan (1906–1988), American film actress
- Dorothy Misener Jurney (1909–2002), American journalist
- Dorothy Kay, Irish-born South African artist
- Dorothy Khadem-Missagh (born 1992), Austrian pianist and conductor
- Dorothy Kelly (1894–1966), American actress
- Dorothy Ker, New Zealand-born composer
- Dorothy Kilgallen (1913–1965), American journalist and television game show panelist
- Dorothy Kilner (1755–1836), English children's writer
- Dorothy King (artist), British artist, curator and teacher
- Dorothy Stratton King (1909–2007), American painter and printmaker
- Dorothy Kingsley (1909–1997), American screenwriter
- Dorothy Kirsten (1910–1992), American opera singer
- Dorothy Kloss (1923–2026), American dancer
- Dorothy Knapp, American dancer, actress, model and Ziegfeld girl
- Dorothy Knapp (artist) (1907–1986), American cover maker
- Dorothy Koomson (born 1971), English writer
- Dorothy K. Kripke (1912–2000), American author
- Dorothy Kunhardt (1901–1979), American writer
- Dorothy LaBostrie (1928–2007), American songwriter
- Dorothy, Lady Pakington (1623–1679), English writer
- Dorothy Lamour (1914–1996), American film actress
- Dorothy Langley (1904–1969), American novelist
- Dorothy P. Lathrop (1891–1980), American writer and illustrator
- Dorothy Lawson, Canadian cellist and composer
- Dorothy Layton (1912–2009), American actress
- Dorothy Leigh (died c. 1616), British writer
- Dorothy Leviny (1881–1968), Australian artist
- Dorothy Livesay (1909–1996), Canadian poet
- Dorothy Lockwood, British artist known for her watercolor paintings
- Dorothy Loeb (1887–1971), American painter
- Dorothy Loudon (1925–2003), American actress, singer and performer
- Dorothy Lovett (1915–1998), American actress
- Dorothy Mackie Low (1916–2002), British writer
- Dorothy Lucey (born 1958), American actress
- Dorothy Lyman (born 1947), American actress
- Dorothy Mackaill (1903–1990), British-American actress
- Dorothy Maclean (1920–2020), Canadian writer
- Dorothy Malone (1924–2018), American actress
- Dorothy Malone (writer), American writer
- Dorothy Manners, American gossip columnist
- Dorothy Manning (1919–2012), New Zealand artist
- Dorothy Marcic, American dramatist
- Dorothy Massingham (1889–1933), British actress and playwright
- Dorothy Masuka (1935–2019), South African jazz singer
- Dorothy Mayhall, American sculptor
- Dorothy Maynor (1910–1996), American singer
- Dorothy McGuire (1916–2001), American actress
- Dorothy McKim (born 1961), American film producer
- Dorothy Mead (1928–1975), British painter
- Dorothy Meyer (1924–1987), American actress
- Dorothy Canning Miller (1904–2003), American curator
- Dorothy Minto (c. 1886–1957), Scottish actress
- Dorothy Molloy (1942–2004), Irish poet, journalist and artist
- Dorothy Morang (1906–1994), American painter and pastelist
- Dorothy Morlan (1882–1967), American painter
- Dorothy Morris (1922–2011), American actress
- Dorothy Morton (1869–1939), American stage actress
- Dorothy Morton (pianist) (1924–2008), Canadian pianist and music educator
- Dorothy Moskowitz (born 1940), American singer
- Dorothy Milne Murdock, better known by her pen name Acharya S (1960–2015), American Christ myth theorist
- Dorothy Napangardi (died 2013), Australian artist
- Dorothy Nimmo (1932–2001), British poet
- Dorothy Norwood (born 1935), American gospel singer and songwriter
- Dorothy O'Connor (born 1970), American photographer and installation artist
- Dorothy Ochtman, American painter
- Dorothy Osborne (1627–1695), British letter writer
- Dorothy Papadakos, American concert organist, composer, lyricist, playwright and author
- Dorothy Parke (1904–1990), Irish musician and composer
- Dorothy Parker (1893–1967), American satirist and poet
- Dorothy Hinshaw Patent (born 1940), American writer
- Dorothy Patrick (1921–1987), Canadian-American actress
- Dorothy Patten (1905–1975), American theatre producer
- Dorothy Paul, Scottish actress, comedian and entertainer
- Dorothy Margaret Paulin (1904–1982), Scottish poet and editor
- Dorothy Peterson (1897–1979), American actress
- Dorothy Randolph Peterson, American actress
- Dorothy Phillips (1889–1980), American actress
- Dorothy Provine (1935–2010), American singer, dancer and actress
- Dorothy Wagner Puccinelli (1901–1974), American painter
- Dorothy Ann Purser, American screenwriter
- Dorothy Quick (1896–1962), American novelist and poet
- Dorothy Wegman Raphaelson (1904–2005), American dancer, novelist and vaudeville performer
- Dorothy Revier (1904–1993), American actress
- Dorothy Reynolds (1913–1977), British writer and actress
- Dorothy Rhoads (1895–1986), American children's author
- Dorothy Richardson (1873–1957), British author and journalist
- Dorothy Robertson (died 1979), New Zealand painter
- Dorothy Rockfort (1877–1924), American screenwriter
- Dorothy Roe (1904–1985), American newspaper editor
- Dorothy Rouse Bottom (1896–1990), American newspaper editor
- Dorothy Rutka, American artist
- Dorothy Samuelson-Sandvid (1902–1984), author and journalist
- Dorothy Sarbitt, British artist
- Dorothy Sarnoff (1914–2008), American actress
- Dorothy L. Sayers (1893–1957), English writer
- Dorothy Scarborough (1878–1935), American novelist
- Dorothy Seacombe (1906–1994), British actress
- Dorothy Seastrom (1903–1930), American actress
- Dorothy Sebastian (1903–1957), American actress
- Dorothy Shakespear (1886–1973), English painter
- Dorothy Shay (1921–1978), American singer
- Dorothy Sherrill (1901–1990), American writer
- Dorothy Short (1915–1963), American actress
- Dorothy Silk (1883–1942), English soprano
- Dorothy Vernell Simmons, American singer
- Dorothy Evelyn Smith (1893–1969), English novelist
- Dorothy Simpson (1933–2020), United Kingdom mystery novelist
- Dorothy Sloop (1913–1998), American jazz musician
- Dorothy Smoller, American actress
- Dorothy Carleton Smyth (1880–1933), Scottish artist
- Dorothy Spencer (1909–2002), American film editor
- Dorothy Gladys Spicer (1893–1975), American folklorist
- Dorothy Sproule (1867–1963), Canadian poet
- Dorothy Squires (1915–1998), Welsh singer
- Dorothy Sterling (1913–2008), American writer
- Dorothy Stevens (1888–1966), Canadian etcher, portrait painter, printmaker, illustrator and teacher
- D. E. Stevenson (1892–1973), Scottish author
- Dorothy Stickney (1896–1998), American actress
- Dorothy Stoner (1904–1992), Australian artist
- Dorothy Straight (born 1958), American author
- Dorothy Stratten (1960–1980), Canadian Playboy Playmate, model and actress
- Dorothy Strutt (1941–2019), English singer and musician
- Dorothy Margaret Stuart (1889–1963), British poet and writer
- Dorothy Sturm (1910–1988), American artist
- Dorothy Howard Talbot (1886–1965), English actor and director
- Dorothy Taubman (1917–2013), American music teacher
- Dorothy Tenham (1931–2008), English actor and stage manager
- Dorothy Tennant (1855–1926), English painter
- Dorothy Tennant (actress) (1865–1942), American actress
- Dorothy Tree (1906–1992), American actress
- Dorothy Tristan (1934–2023), American actress and screenwriter
- Dorothy Tse, Hong Kong author, editor and assistant professor
- Dorothy Tutin (1930–2001), British actress
- Dorothy Uhnak (1930–2006), American writer
- Dorothy Van (1928–2002), American actress
- Dorothy Van Doren (1896–1993), American novelist
- Dorothy Van Engle (1910–2004), American actress and model
- Dorothy Varian (1895–1985), American painter
- Dorothy Venning (1885–c. 1942), British artist
- Dorothy Vernon (1875–1970), American actress
- Dorothy Elaine Vicaji (1880–1945), English portrait painter
- Dorothy Vicary (1932–2009), English novelist
- Dorothy Wall (1894–1942), New Zealand-born author
- Dorothy Walters (1877–1934), American actress
- Dorothy Wanderman, American composer and pianist
- Dorothy Wang (born 1988), American television personality
- Dorothy Ward (1890–1987), English actress
- Dorothy Warenskjold (1921–2010), American opera singer
- Dorothy Wellman (1913–2009), American actress
- Dorothy M. Wheeler, English illustrator
- Dorothy Whipple (1893–1966), English novelist and children's writer
- Dorothy Wilding (1893–1976), English professional portrait photographer
- Dorothy Stanton Wise (1879–1918), British sculptor
- Dorothy Woolfolk (1913–2000), American comic book editor
- Dorothy Wordsworth (1771–1855), English author, poet and sister of William Wordsworth
- Dorothy Yost (1899–1967), American screenwriter
- Dorothy Weir Young (1890–1947), American painter
- Dorothy Young (1907–2011), American entertainer and actress
- Dorothy Ziegler (1922–1972), American musician

=== Nobility and royalty ===
- Dorothy Bentinck (1750–1794), British noblewoman and Duchess of Portland
- Dorothy Boyle (1699–1758), English noblewoman and Countess of Burlington and Countess of Cork
- Dorothy Bulstrode, lady-in-waiting to Anne in Denmark
- Dorothy Catherine of Brandenburg-Ansbach (1538–1604), princess of Brandenburg-Ansbach and by marriage burgravine of Meissen
- Dorothy Farrar (1899–1987), British Methodist deaconess and preacher
- Dorothy Garai, Queen consort of Bosnia
- Dorothy Edna Genders (1892–1978), Australian Anglican deaconess
- Dorothy Hastings, English courtier
- Dorothy Hazzard, English Baptist leader
- Dorothy of Kashin (1549–1629), Eastern Orthodox Saint and noblewoman
- Dorothy Kerin (1889–1963), English Christian visionary
- Dorothy Lawson, English noblewoman and recusant
- Dorothy Montagu (c. 1716/17–1797), British noblewoman and Countess of Sandwich
- Dorothy Percy (1564–1619), English noblewoman and Countess of Northumberland
- Dorothy Ripley (1767–1831), British/American evangelist
- Dorothy Robinson, Canadian missionary teacher and Girl Guide leader
- Dorothy Savile (1640–1670), English noblewoman and Viscountess Halifax
- Dorothy Sidney (1598–1659), English noblewoman and Countess of Leicester
- Dorothy Silking, Danish courtier
- Dorothy Spencer (1617–1684), English noblewoman and Countess of Sunderland
- Dorothy Stafford (1526–1604), English noblewoman
- Dorothy Townshend, Viscountess Townshend (1686–1726), English aristocrat
- Dorothy Wadham (1534–1618), founder of Wadham College, Oxford
- Dorothy Wellesley (1889–1956), British noblewoman and Duchess of Wellington
- Dorothy Sanders Wells, Episcopalian bishop
- Dorothy Wood (1885–1976), British noblewoman and Countess of Halifax

=== Politics and activism ===
- Dorothy Archibald (1895–1960), British politician
- Dorothy F. Bailey, American politician
- Dorothy Bain, Scottish advocate
- Dorothy Barnes (1932–1985), American politician
- Dorothy Jacobs Bellanca (1894–1946), American labor activist
- Dorothy Bendross-Mindingall (born 1942), American politician
- Dorothy Blomfield (1893–1987), New Zealand welfare worker and local politician
- Dorothy Lee Bolden (1924–2005), American trade unionist
- Dorothy Bradley (born 1947), American politician
- Dorothy Hamilton Brush (1894–1968), American birth control advocate, women's rights advocate and author
- Dorothy Buckland-Fuller (1922–2019), Australian sociologist, peace and human rights activist, migrant community advocate and humanist
- Dorothy R. Burnley (1927–2016), American politician
- Dorothy Buxton (1881–1963), British activist
- Dorothy Carpenter (1933–2011), American politician
- Dorothy Buffum Chandler (1901–1997), American cultural leader
- Dorothy Conaghan Chiles (born 1930), American politician
- Dorothy Corrigan (1914–2010), Canadian politician
- Dorothy Cotton (1930–2018), American civil rights activist
- Dorothy Counts (born 1942), American activist
- Dorothy Davids (1923–2014), American educator, educational services administrator, and a Native American and women's rights activist
- Dorothy Day (1897–1980), American journalist and social activist
- Dorothy L. Devereux (1911–1994), American politician
- Dorothy Detzer (1893–1981), American activist
- Dorothy Dixer, Australian political term
- Dorothy Dobbie (born 1945), Canadian politician
- Dorothy N. Dolbey (1908–1991), American politician
- Dorothy Donohue (1911–1960), California state legislator
- Dorothy Dunlop (1929–2021), Northern Irish politician
- Dorothy Eck (1924–2017), American politician
- Dorothy Andrews Elston Kabis, American politician
- Dorothy Evans (1888–1944), British feminist activist and suffragette
- Dorothy Evans (trade unionist) (c. 1893–1943), British trade union leader
- Dorothy Felton (1929–2008), American politician and member of the Georgia House of Representatives
- Dorothy Fraser (1926–2015), New Zealand community activist and local politician
- Dorothy Geeben (1908–2010), American mayor
- Dorothy Glisson (1912–2001), American politician
- Dorothy Goble (1910–1990), Australian politician
- Dorothy Gonzaga, Filipina politician
- Dorothy Granada (born 1930), American nurse and peace activist
- Dorothy Smith Gruening, American pacifist
- Dorothy Gwajima, Tanzanian politician
- Dorothy Haener (1917–2001), American women union activist
- Dorothy Hale (1905–1938), American socialite
- Dorothy Hamm (1919–2004), American civil rights activist
- Dorothy Heneker (1886–1968), Canadian lawyer and feminist
- Dorothy Hardisty (1881–1973), English civil servant and humanitarian
- Dorothy Height (1912–2010), African-American civil rights and women's rights activist
- Dorothy Hendee (died 2003), Colorado state legislator
- Dorothy D. Houghton (1890–1972), American activist
- Dorothy Hukill (1946–2018), American politician
- Dorothy H. Hutchinson (1905–1984), American activist, lecturer and author
- Dorothy Hyuha (born 1962), Ugandan politician
- Dorothy Inglis (1926–2013), Canadian feminist and author
- Dorothy Isaksen (1930–2023), Australian politician
- Dorothy Jelicich (1928–2015), New Zealand politician
- Dorothy Jinarajadasa (1881–1963), English feminist, suffragette and writer
- Dorothy Azairwe Nshaija Kabaraitsya (born 1974), Ugandan politician
- Dorothy Keeling (1881–1967), British social worker
- Dorothy M. Kellogg (1920–2018), American politician
- Dorothy Kelly Gay, Irish-born American politician
- Dorothy Kenyon (1888–1972), American lawyer, judge and political activist
- Dorothy Kostrzewa (1928–2013), Canadian politician
- Dorothy Kotz (born 1944), Australian politician
- Dorothy Kuya (1932–2013), British communist and anti-racist activist
- Dorothy Bell Lawrence (1911–1973), New York assemblywoman
- Dorothy Lawson (1580–1632), English recusant and Catholic priest harbourer
- Dorothy Layton (1887–1959), English suffragist and politician
- Dorothy Lightbourne, Jamaican politician
- Dorothy Mabiletsa, South African politician
- Dorothy McAulay Martin (born 1937), First Lady of North Carolina
- Dorothy McAuliffe (born 1963), American attorney and First Lady of the Commonwealth of Virginia
- Dorothy McCabe Canadian politician
- Dorothy McCluskey (died 2013), American politician and conservationist
- Dorothy Shoemaker McDiarmid (1906–1994), American politician
- Dorothy McRae-McMahon, Australian retired Uniting Church minister and activist
- Dorothy Miller (1920–2008), American politician
- Dorothy Lonewolf Miller (1920–2003), Blackfoot activist
- Dorothy Moon (born 1958), American politician and businesswoman
- Dorothy Motubatse-Hounkpatin (born 1957), South African politician
- Dorothy Nditi, Kenyan politician
- Dorothy Nichols (1923–2004), American politician
- Dorothy Nyakato, Ugandan politician
- Dorothy Nyembe (1931–1998), South African activist and politician
- Dorothy Kuhn Oko (1896–1971), librarian and labor unionist
- Dorothy Osler (1923–2003), American politician
- Dorothy Pelanda (born 1956), American politician
- Dorothy Barnes Pelote (1929–2015), American politician
- Dorothy A. Perkins (1926–2010), American politician
- Dorothy Pethick (1881–1970), British suffragette
- Dorothy Pizer (1906–1964), British working-class anti-racist activist, secretary and publishing worker
- Dorothy Pratt (born 1955), Australian politician
- Dorothy Rahman, Bangladeshi politician
- Dorothy Ramodibe (born 1942), South African politician
- Dorothy Robins-Mowry (1921–2021), American diplomat
- Dorothy H. Rose (1920–2005), New York assemblywoman
- Dorothy Rupert (born 1926), American teacher, counselor and politician
- Dorothy M. Sampas, American diplomat
- Dorothy Sample (1911–2002), American politician
- Dorothy Satti (1901–1960), American politician
- Dorothy Shea, American diplomat
- Dorothy Shephard, Canadian politician
- Dorothy Stafford (1905–1997), American public service administrator and women's rights activist
- Dorothy Steeves (1891–1978), Canadian politician
- Dorothy C. Stratton (1899–2006), American first director of SPARS
- Dorothy Tangney (1907–1985), Australian politician
- Dorothy Mae Taylor (1928–2000), African-American politician and civil rights activist
- Dorothy Thornhill, Baroness Thornhill (born 1955), British Liberal Democrats politician and the first directly elected mayor of Watford, Hertfordshire
- Dorothy Thurtle (1890–1973), British women's rights activist and politician
- Dorothy Tillman (born 1947), American politician and civil rights activist
- Dorothy von Beroldingen (1915–1999), American lawyer, judge, and political figure
- Dorothy Grace Waring (1891–1977), English fascist campaigner and novelist
- Dorothy Wilde (1895–1941), English socialite
- Dorothy Wilken (born 1936), American politician
- Dorothy Woodman (1902–1970), British social activist and journalist
- Dorothy Wyatt (1925–2001), Canadian politician
- Dorothy Zellner (born 1938), American human rights activist and feminist

=== Science ===
- Dorothy Adkins (1912–1975), American psychologist
- Dorothy Carolin Bacon (1902–1998), American economist
- Dorothy Bainton, American pathologist
- Dorothy Bannon (1885–1940), English nurse
- Dorothy Jessie Bartlett (1887–1941), British chemist
- Dorothy W. Baruch (1899–1962), American psychologist
- Dorothy Beckett, American scientist
- Dorothy V. M. Bishop (born 1952), British psychologist
- Dorothy Blum (1924–1980), American computer scientist and cryptanalyst
- Dorothy Brady (1903–1977), American mathematician and economist
- Dorothy Burlingham (1891–1979), American psychoanalyst
- Dorothy Adlington Cadbury (1892–1987), British botanist and director of confectionery company Cadbury's
- Dorothy Carroll (1907–1970), Australian geologist
- Dorothy Cayley, British mycologist
- Dorothy Cheney (1958–2018), American primatologist
- Dorothy H. Crawford, Scottish microbiologist
- Dorothy Cridland (1903–1987), English mechanical engineer
- Dorothy G. Downie (1894–1960), Scottish botanist and forester
- Dorothy Jung Echols (1916–1997), American geologist
- Dorothy Espelage, American psychologist
- Dorothy Boulding Ferebee (1898–1980), American obstetrician and civil rights activist
- Dorothy Gradden, nuclear engineer from the United Kingdom
- Dorothy Hahn (1876–1950), American organic chemist
- Dorothy Hatfield (1940–2024), British aeronautical engineer
- Dorothy Hodgkin (1910–1994), British biochemist and winner of Nobel Prize in Chemistry
- Dorothy Hoffman (1915–1996), American engineer
- Dorothy F. Hollingsworth (1916–1994), British nutritionist and scientist
- Dorothy Evans Holmes (born 1943), American psychoanalytic thinker, psychoanalyst and psychotherapist
- Dorothy M. Horstmann (1911–2001), American medical researcher
- Dorothy Houston Jacobson (1907–1985), American political scientist and educator
- Dorothy Jordan Lloyd (1890–1946), British scientist
- Dorothy Marshall (chemist) (1868–?), British chemist
- Dorothy McClendon (1924–2013), American microbiologist
- Dorothy Metcalf-Lindenburger (1975–present), American astronaut
- Dorothy J. Merritts, American geologist
- Dorothy Monekosso, British computer scientist
- Dorothy Klenke Nash (1898–1976), American neurosurgeon
- Dorothy M. Needham (1896–1987), English biochemist
- Dorothy Nelkin (1933–2003), American sociologist of science
- Dorothy Nickerson (1900–1985), American color scientist
- Dorothy Virginia Nightingale (1902–2000), American organic chemist
- Dorothy Norris, English biochemist
- Dorothy Wanja Nyingi, Kenyan ichthyologist
- Dorothy Okello, Ugandan electrical engineer
- Dorothy Olsen (1916–2019), American aircraft pilot and member of the Women Airforce Service Pilots (WASPs) during World War II
- Dorothy Parkinson (c. 1855–1925), British amateur chemist
- Dorothy J. Phillips (born 1945), American chemist
- Dorothy Pile (1902–1993), British metallurgist
- Dorothy Riggs Pitelka (1920–1994), American zoologist, protistologist and cancer researcher
- Dorothy Powelson (1916–1988), American microbiologist
- Dorothy Helen Rayner (1912–2003), British geologist
- Dorothy Riddle (born 1944), American psychologist
- Dorothy Robson (1919–1943), English physicist and engineer
- Dorothy Rungeling (1911–2018), Canadian pilot
- Dorothy Ruíz Martínez, Mexican-American engineer
- Dorothy Stuart Russell (1895–1983), British pathologist
- Dorothy P. Schafer, American neuroscientist
- Dorothy Semenow, American chemist and first woman graduate student at Caltech
- Dorothy Shaw (1920–2007), American plant pathologist
- Dorothy Martin Simon (1919–2016), American physical chemist
- Dorothy Spicer (1908–1946), aviator and aeronautical engineer
- Dorothy Stein (1931–2019), American psychologist and computer scientist
- Dorothy Stimson (1890–1988), American historian of science
- Dorothy Stowe (1920–2010), American-Canadian environmentalist
- Dorothy Amaury Talbot (1871–1916), British plant collector and ethnographer
- Dorothy Tembo (born 1961), Zambian economist
- Dorothy Tennov (1928–2007), American psychologist
- Dorothy Thursby-Pelham, British scientist and scientific illustrator
- Dorothy Wallace, American mathematician and theorist
- Dorothy Walcott Weeks (1893–1990), American mathematician
- Dorothy Maud Wrinch (1894–1976), mathematician and biochemical theorist
- Dorothy Yeboah-Manu, British microbiologist

=== Sport ===
- Dorothy Andrus (1908–1989), American tennis player
- Dorothy Bacon, American lawn and indoor bowls player
- Dorothy Barr, Scottish international lawn bowler
- Dorothy Becker (1900–1989), American surfer and competitive swimmer
- Dorothy Boadle (1885–c. 1942), Argentine tennis player
- Dorothy Brookshaw (1912–1962), Canadian sprinter
- Dorothy Butterfield (1909–1991), British athlete
- Dorothy Cadman-Cadman (1889–1971), British archer
- Dorothy Caley (1920–2012), Canadian figure skater
- Dorothy Cheney (1916–2014), American tennis player
- Dorothy Christ (1925–2020), American baseball player
- Dorothy Colpoys (1894–1980), English-born Irish badminton player
- Dorothy Cook, Canadian baseball player
- Dorothy Cundall (1882–1954), English badminton player
- Dorothy Dalton (1922–1973), American gymnast
- Dorothy Damaschke (1917–2000), American baseball and badminton player
- Dorothy Delasin (born 1980), Filipino-American professional golfer
- Dorothy Dermody (1909–2012), Irish fencer
- Dorothy Dodson (1919–2003), American track and field athlete
- Dorothy Doolittle (born 1946), American marathon runner and athletics coach
- Dorothy Drew (1934–2001), British diver
- Dorothy Ferguson (1923–2003), Canadian baseball player
- Dorothy Franey (1913–2011), American speed skater
- Dorothy Weisel Hack (1910–1963), American tennis player
- Dorothy Hamill (born 1956), American figure skater
- Dorothy Harrell (1924–2011), baseball player
- Dorothy Harrison (born 1950), English swimmer
- Dorothy Hey (1931–2015), British gymnast
- Dorothy Hobson (born 1946), Jamaican cricketer
- Dorothy Holman (1883–1968), British tennis player
- Dorothy Hyman (born 1941), English sprinter
- Dorothy Kamenshek (1925–2010), American baseball player
- Dorothy Kane, Northern Irish lawn bowler
- Dorothy Kirby (1920–2000), American golfer and sportscaster
- Dorothy Head Knode (1925–2015), American tennis player
- Dorothy Kohl, American tennis player
- Dorothy Kovalchick (1925–2020), American baseball player
- Dorothy Kozak (1932–2009), Canadian sprinter
- Dorothy Levitt (1882–1922), British racing driver
- Dorothy Lidstone (born 1938), Canadian archer
- Dorothy Locke (1912–2005), American fencer
- Dorothy Ludwig (born 1979), Canadian sport shooter
- Dorothy Macfarlane (1931–2002), English cricketer
- Dorothy Maguire (1918–1981), baseball player
- Dorothy Manley (1927–2021), British sprinter
- Dorothy McMahan (born 1976), American long-distance runner
- Dorothy Montgomery (1924–2009), American baseball player
- Dorothy Morkis (born 1942), American equestrian
- Dorothy Mueller (1925–1985), American baseball player
- Dorothy Naum (1928–2008), American baseball player
- Dorothy O'Neil, American badminton player
- Dorothy Poynton-Hill (1915–1995), American diver
- Dorothy Prior (1911–1997), Canadian swimmer
- Dorothy Razzell, British long jumper
- Dorothy Roche (1928–2021), Australian international lawn bowls player
- Dorothy Round (1909–1982), British tennis player
- Dorothy Saunders (1915–2013), English sprinter
- Dorothy Schiller (1916–1992), American swimmer
- Dorothy Schroeder (1928–1996), American baseball player
- Dorothy Scott (born 1957), Jamaican long jumper
- Dorothy Scouler (1910–1972), British athlete and world record holder
- Dorothy Shepherd-Barron (1897–1953), English tennis player
- Dorothy Shirley (born 1939), British higher jumper
- Dorothy Stanley-Turner (1916–1995), British racing driver
- Dorothy Stevenson, Australian tennis player
- Dorothy Stolze (1923–2003), American baseball player
- Dorothy Surgenor (born 1931), American alpine skier
- Dorothy Swinyard (born 1951), British discus thrower and shot putter
- Dorothy Hayden Truscott (1925–2006), American bridge player
- Dorothy Tyler-Odam (1920–2014), British high jumper
- Dorothy Vest (1919–2013), American tennis player
- Dorothy Wall (born 2000), Irish rugby union player
- Dorothy Walton (1909–1981), Canadian badminton player
- Dorothy Weston (1900–1998), Australian tennis player
- Dorothy Wind, baseball player
- Dorothy Wise, American pool player
- Dorothy Workman (1912–1981), American tennis player
- Dorothy Wright (1889–1960), British yacht racer
- Dorothy Yeats (born 1993), Canadian freestyle wrestler

=== Other ===
- Dorothy Inez Adams (1904–1967), American anthropologist
- Dorothy Adlow (1901–1964), American art critic and lecturer
- Dorothy Sears Ainsworth (1894–1976), American physical educator
- Dorothy Akerele, British Nigerian musician and hostess
- Dorothy Allison (1924–1999), American psychic
- Dorothy Hansine Andersen (1901–1963), American physician
- Dorothy Angola (c. 1626–1689), Black landowner in colonial New York
- Dorothy Anstett (born 1947), American pageant titleholder
- Dorothy Arnold (1885–1910), American socialite who disappeared mysteriously
- Dorothy Atkinson (1929–2016), American historian
- Dorothy Banks (1876–1937), British conchologist, gardener and naturalist
- Dorothy Pelham Beckley (1897–1959), American educator
- Dorothy Benham (born 1955), American beauty pageant winner
- Dorothy A. Bennett (1909–1999), American anthropologist, astronomer, curator, publisher, and author
- Dorothy Benson, Canadian photographer
- Dorothy Lewis Bernstein (1914–1988), American mathematician
- Dorothy V. M. Bishop (born 1952), British psychologist
- Dorothy Blair (1913–1998), English scholar and translator
- Dorothy B. Blaney (1921–1998), American philatelist
- Dorothy Bliss (1916–1987), American invertebrate zoologist
- Dorothy Cameron Bloore (1924–2000), Canadian art dealer and artist
- Dorothy Blount Lamar, American historian and activist
- Dorothy Bohm (1924–2023), German-born British photographer
- Dorothy Borg (1902–1993), American historian
- Dorothy Bradshaigh (1854–1937), British social reformer and writer
- Dorothy Chin Brandt (1946–2025), American judge
- Dorothy Braxton (1927–2014), the first female journalist from New Zealand to visit Antarctica
- Dorothy Brock (1886–1969), British academic and educator
- Dorothy M. Broderick (1929–2011), American librarian
- Dorothy Brooke (1883–1955), British philanthropist
- Dorothy Brunson (1939–2011), African-American broadcaster
- Dorothy Richardson Buell, American educator and nature preservationist
- Dorothy Bullitt (1892–1989), American businesswoman and philanthropist
- Dorothy K. Burnham (1911–2004), Canadian textile scholar, author and museum curator
- Dorothy Byrne, Scottish television producer and college president
- Dorothy Calthorpe, English writer and philanthropist
- Dorothy Cantor, American psychologist
- Dorothy Walworth Carman, American novelist, writer and lecturer
- Dorothy Casterline (1928–2023), American linguist
- Dorothy M. Catts (1896–1961), Australian writer, editor and businesswoman
- Dorothy Cawood (1884–1962), Australian civilian and World War I military nurse
- Dorothy Chacko (1904–1992), American social worker, humanitarian and medical doctor
- Dorothy Kinney Chambers (1901–2001), baptist missionary physician
- Dorothy Charlesworth, archaeologist
- Dorothy Clutterbuck (1880–1951), British occultist
- Dorothy Sue Cobble (born 1949), American historian
- Dorothy Danforth Compton (1895–1974), American philanthropist
- Dorothy Davis Cook (1912–2005), American missionary registered nurse
- Dorothy Cornelius (1918–1992), American registered nurse
- Dorothy Cornish (1870–1945), English educator, suffragist, writer and editor
- Dorothy Crawford (1911–1988), Australian broadcaster
- Dorothy Crisp (1906–1987), British political figure and writer
- Dorothy M. Crosland (1903–1983), American librarian
- Dorothy Custer (1911–2015), American comedian and harmonicist
- Dorothy Daniels (1916–1981), New Zealand ballet teacher and director
- Dorothy Still Danner (1914–2001), American navy nurse and prisoner of war during World War II
- Dorothy Davids (1923–2014), Native American educator and activist
- Dorothy May De Lany (1908–1970), New Zealand hotel worker and trade unionist
- Dorothy DeLay (1917–2002), American violin instructor
- Dorothy Deming, nurse and writer
- Dorothy E. Denning (born 1945), American information security researcher
- Dorothy Dinnerstein (1923–1992), American feminist activist and author
- Dorothy Dodd (1902–1994), first State Archivist and second State Librarian of Florida
- Dorothy Catherine Draper (1807–1901), artist, educator and feminist
- Dorothy Drummond (1928–2018), geography educator
- Dorothy Du Boisson (1919–2013), British codebreaker
- Dorothy Dunn (1902–1993), American art instructor
- Dorothy Dworkin (1889–1976), Canadian nurse and activist
- Dorothy van Dyke Leake (1893–1990), American botanist, artist and educator
- Dorothy Eady (1904–1981), British Egyptologist
- Dorothy Harley Eber (1925–2022), Canadian historian
- Dorothy Nneka Ede, Nigerian entrepreneur and sports enthusiast
- Dorothy Edgington (born 1941), British philosopher
- Dorothy Way Eggan (1901–1965), American anthropologist
- Dorothy Ellicott, Gibraltarian historian and politician
- Dorothy Emmet (1904–2000), British philosopher
- Dorothy Estrada-Tanck, Mexican academic
- Dorothy Fellowes-Gordon (1891–1991), British socialite, coal industry heiress and singer
- Dorothy Fink, American endocrinologist
- Dorothy Finkelhor (1902–1988), American academic
- Dorothy Fischer (c. 1931–1981), South African heart transplant patient
- Dorothy Canfield Fisher (1879–1958), American author and social activist
- Dorothy Fletcher (1927–2017), New Zealand historian
- Dorothy Fosdick (1913–1997), American foreign policy expert
- Dorothy L. Freeman, American lawyer
- Dorothy Fuldheim (1893–1989), American journalist and anchor
- Dorothy Galton (1901–1992), British university administrator
- Dorothy Gardiner (1873–1957), British non-fiction writer and historian
- Dorothy Ayer Gardner Ford (1892–1967), mother of U. S. President Gerald Ford
- Dorothy Garrod (1892–1968), British archaeologist
- Dorothy Geddes (1936–1998), first woman dentist in the United Kingdom
- Dorothy Edna Genders (1892–1978), Australian Anglican deaconess
- Dorothy Ghettuba, Kenyan film and TV entrepreneur
- Dorothy M. Gilford (1919–2014), American statistician
- Dorothy Butler Gilliam (born 1936), American journalist
- Dorothy Goebel (1898–1976), American historian
- Dorothy Goodman (1926–2023), American educator
- Dorothy Goodwin (1914–2007), American educator and politician
- Dorothy Grafly (1896–1980), American journalist and curator
- Dorothy Griffiths (born 1947), British academic and sociologist
- Dorothy Awes Haaland (1918–1996), American lawyer and politician
- Dorothy Habel (born 1950), American historian of Ancient Roman art
- Dorothy Jean Hailes (1926–1988), Australian medical practitioner
- Dorothy Cann Hamilton (1949–2016), American chef
- Dorothy Hammerstein (1899–1987), Australian-born American interior designer and decorator
- D. Antoinette Handy, American flautist and professor
- Dorothy Christian Hare (1876–1967), English physician
- Dorothy Harrison Eustis (1886–1946), American dog breeder
- Dorothy Hartley (1893–1985), English social historian, illustrator and author
- Dorothy M. Healy (1914–1990), American English professor and historian
- Dorothy Heathcote (1926–2011), British drama teacher and academic
- Dorothy Henriques-Wells (1926–2018), Jamaican painter and educator
- Dorothy Hill (1907–1997), Australian geologist and paleontologist
- Dorothy Hindman (born 1966), American composer and music educator
- Dorothy A. Hogg (born 1959), twenty-third Surgeon General of the United States Air Force
- Dorothy Hokr (1923–1998), American homemaker and politician
- Dorothy Hollingsworth (1920–2022), American educator
- Dorothy Horrell (born 1951), American educator, university administrator and philanthropy administrator
- Dorothy Hosmer (1911–2008), American photojournalist
- Dorothy Jeakins (1914–1995), American costume designer
- Dorothy Cross Jensen (1906–1972), American archaeologist
- Dorothy Jewson (1884–1964), British teacher, trade union organizer and Labour Party politician
- Dorothy Johansen (1904–1999), American historian
- Dorothy Misener Jurney (1909–2002), American journalist
- Dorothy Kamanga (born 1970), Malawian Supreme Court judge
- Dorothy Kazel (1939–1980), American Ursuline religious sister and missionary to El Salvador
- Dorothy Keur (1904–1989), American cultural anthropologist
- Dorothy J. Killam (c. 1900–1965), American-born Canadian philanthropist
- Dorothy King, American archaeologist and historian
- Dorothy Kisaka (born 1964), Ugandan lawyer and corporate executive
- Dorothy Kitson, London wealthy merchant and the builder of Hengrave Hall in Suffolk
- Dorothy Knox (1902–1983), Australian headmistress
- Dorothy Y. Ko, American historian
- Dorothy Korber, American journalist
- Dorothy Kosinski (born 1933), American art historian
- Dorothy Lamb (1887–1967), British archaeologist
- Dorothy Larcher, English designer of textiles
- Dorothy Lawrence (1896–1964), English reporter, secretly posed as a man to become a British soldier during World War I
- Dorothy Layne McIntyre (1917–2015), African-American aviator and educator
- Dorothy Leavey (1897–1998), American philanthropist
- Dorothy Leland, American academic administrator
- Dorothy A. Leonard, American professor of business administration
- Dorothy Lichtenstein (1939–2024), American philanthropist
- Dorothy Liddell, British archaeologist
- Dorothy Liebes (1897–1972), American textile designer and weaver
- Dorothy Sunrise Lorentino (1909–2005), Native American teacher
- Dorothy Lowry-Corry (1885–1967), Irish historian and archaeologist
- Dorothy Lyndall (1891–1979), American dancer and dance educator
- Dorothy Macardle (1889–1958), Irish writer and historian
- Dorothy Mackay (1881–1953), British archaeologist
- Dorothy Maijor, wife of Richard Cromwell
- Dorothy Marshall (archaeologist), Scottish archaeologist
- Dorothy Marshall (historian) (1900–1994), English social historian
- Dorothy May Marshall (1902–1961), Australian schoolteacher, war-time welfare worker and public servant
- Dorothy May Meads (1891–1958), British historian
- Dorothy McCoy (1903–2001), American mathematician
- Dorothy McEwen Kildall (1943–2005), American microcomputer industry pioneer
- Dorothy McKibbin (1897–1985), Manhattan Project during World War II
- Dorothy McKnight, American female sports coach and administrator
- Dorothy McMillan (1943–2021), British literary scholar
- Dorothy Reed Mendenhall (1874–1964), American pediatrician
- Dorothy Mengering (1921–2017), mother of David Letterman
- Dorothy Meredith (1906–1986), American artist and educator
- Dorothy Middleton (1909–1999), British geographer and writer
- Dorothy Miell, professor of social psychology
- Dorothy Miles (1931–1993), British poet and activist
- Dorothy Molter (1907–1986), American hermit
- Dorothy Morland, British arts administrator
- Dorothy Moulton Mayer, English soprano, philanthropist, peace activist and biographer
- Dorothy Musuleng-Cooper (1930–2009), Liberian educator and politician
- Dorothy Klenke Nash (1898–1976), American neurosurgeon
- Dorothy Wright Nelson (born 1928), American judge
- Dorothy L. Njeuma (born 1943), Cameroonian academic and politician
- Dorothy Nolte (1924–2005), American writer and family counselor
- Dorothy Norman (1905–1997), American writer, editor, arts patron and social activist
- Dorothy Noyes, American folklorist and ethnologist
- Dorothy Nyswander (1894–1998), American psychologist
- Dorothy O'Grady (897–1985), the first British woman found guilty of treachery in World War II
- Dorothy Ooko, Kenyan activist and technology professional
- Dorothy Owen (1920–2002), English archivist and historian
- Dorothy Paget (1905–1960), British racehorse owner
- Dorothy Binney Palmer (1888–1982), American socialite and world traveler
- Dorothy Pantin (1896–1985), doctor and surgeon
- Dorothy Payne Whitney (1887–1968), American-born social activist, philanthropist and publisher
- Dorothy Pelham (died 1613), English benefactor
- Dorothy Peters (1930–2019), Australian indigenous community leader and artist
- Dorothy Peto (1886–1974), first female police superintendent in the UK
- Dorothy Pickles (1903–1994), British historian and political scientist
- Dorothy Ruth Pirone (1921–1989), American biographer, daughter of Babe Ruth
- Dorothy Pocklington (1934–2024), American Army general
- Dorothy Popenoe (1899–1932), English botanist, archaeologist and scientific illustrator
- Dorothy Price (physician) (1890–1954), Irish doctor
- Dorothy Price (art historian), professor of art history
- Dorothy Price (endocrinologist) (1899–1980), American endocrinologist
- Dorothy Proctor, Canadian author and activist
- Dorothy Purdew (1932–2023), British businesswoman
- Dorothy Quincy (1747–1830), wife of John Hancock
- Dorothy Rabinowitz, American journalist
- Dorothy MacBride Radwanski (1928–2012), British nurse
- Dorothy Una Ratcliffe (1887–1967), British poet and Lady Mayoress of Leeds
- Dorothy Jean Ray (1919–2007), American art historian
- Dorothy M. Reeder, American librarian
- Dorothy E. Reilly (1920–1996), American nurse
- Dorothy Reitman, Canadian philanthropist and activist
- Dorothy Renton (1898–1966), Scottish gardener
- Dorothy Comstock Riley (1924–2004), American judge
- Dorothy Roberts (born 1956), American sociologist
- Dorothy Douglas Robinson Kidder (1917–1995), American philanthropist
- Dorothy Rodgers (1909–1992), American writer, inventor, businesswoman and philanthropist
- Dorothy Goldin Rosenberg, Canadian educator and film consultant
- Dorothy Rosenman (1900–1991), American advocate for low-cost housing and author
- Dorothy Rowe (1930–2019), Australian psychologist and author
- Dorothy Scharf (1942–2004), British philanthropist
- Dorothy Sciff (1903–1989), American businesswoman who was the owner and publisher of the New York Post
- Dorothy Schwieder (1933–2014), American historian, biographer and academic
- Dorothy Seymour Mills (1928–2019), American baseball researcher
- Dorothy Shaver (1893–1959), American businesswoman and president of Lord & Taylor
- Dorothy Shea (1941–2024), Australian librarian
- Dorothy Shepard, American designer
- Dorothy G. Shepherd (1916–1992), museum curator and historian
- Dorothy Sheridan (born 1948), British archivist
- Dorothy Sherwood (1908–?), American burlesque performer
- Dorothy Shineberg (1927–2004), Australian historian
- Dorothy M. Skinner (1930–2005), American carcinologist
- Dorothy Allred Solomon, American author and educator
- Dorothy Spiers (1897–1977), English actuary
- Dorothy Stang (1931–2005), Catholic nun of the Sisters of Notre Dame de Namur
- Dorothy Stanley (1924–1990), American educator and activist
- Dorothy Hester Stenzel (1910–1991), American aviator and stunt pilot
- Dorothy Sterling (1913–2008), American journalist
- Dorothy Stroud (1910–1997), English museum curator and biographer
- Dorothy Sucher (1933–2010), American journalist
- Dorothy Tarrant (1885–1973), British classical scholar
- Dorothy Theomin (1888–1966), New Zealand philanthropist and mountaineer
- Dorothy Ann Thrupp (1779–1847), English psalmist, hymnwriter, translator
- Dorothy Todd, British magazine editor
- Dorothy Trump (1964–2013), English physician
- Dorothy Tuttle (1918–1998), American dancer
- Dorothy Tyner, American judge
- Dorothy Ufot, Nigerian lawyer
- Dorothy Vellenga (1937–1984), American educator
- Dorothy B. Waage (1905–1997), American numismatist
- Dorothy Warburton (1936–2016), Canadian geneticist
- Dorothy Grace Waring (1891–1977), English fascist campaigner and author
- Dorothy Warren (1905–2008), American writer, photographer and officer in the United States Army
- Dorothy Wedderburn (1925–2012), English sociologist and college head
- Dorothy Neal White (1915–1995), New Zealand librarian, writer and collector
- Dorothy Whitehead (1908–1976), Australian headmistress
- Dorothy Whitelock (1901–1984), English historian
- Dorothy Wiggins (born 1925), American social media influencer
- Dorothy Wills (1911–2007), New Zealand architect
- Dorothy Cowser Yancy (born 1944), American academic
- Dorothy Cavalier Yanik (1928–2015), American artist and educator
- Dorothy Zinberg (1928–2020), American scholar

== Disambiguation ==
- Dorothy Alexander
- Dorothy Baker
- Dorothy Black
- Dorothy Bradford
- Dorothy Brown
- Dorothy Buchanan
- Dorothy Bush
- Dorothy Campbell
- Dorothy Cox
- Dorothy Davis
- Dorothy Edwards
- Dorothy Gordon
- Dorothy Green
- Dorothy Hall
- Dorothy Hayes
- Dorothy Healy
- Dorothy Hoover
- Dorothy Howell
- Dorothy Hughes
- Dorothy Johnson
- Dorothy Jones
- Dorothy Knowles
- Dorothy Lee
- Dorothy Lewis
- Dorothy Miner
- Dorothy Moore
- Dorothy Morrison
- Dorothy Page
- Dorothy Porter
- Dorothy Rice
- Dorothy Richards
- Dorothy Ross
- Dorothy Sims
- Dorothy Smith
- Dorothy Steel
- Dorothy Stone
- Dorothy Summers
- Dorothy Thomas
- Dorothy Thompson
- Dorothy Vaughan
- Dorothy Walker
- Dorothy West
- Dorothy Williams
- Dorothy Wilson

== Animals ==
- Dorofei (2004–2014), the male pet cat of former Russian President Dmitry Medvedev

== Fictional characters ==
- Dorothy Burke, character in the Australian soap opera Neighbours
- Dorothy Catalonia, a character from the Gundam Wing anime series
- Dorothy the Dinosaur, a character from Australian children's TV series The Wiggles
- Dorothy Gale, the little girl who was blown to the Land of Oz by a cyclone in L. Frank Baum's 1900 book The Wonderful Wizard of Oz and the classic 1939 movie adaptation The Wizard of Oz
- Dorothy Hayes, character on American television soap opera One Life to Live
- Dorothy Hoyle, character on the British television soap opera Coronation Street
- Dorothy "Ace" McShane, a companion of the Seventh Doctor from Doctor Who, played by Sophie Aldred
- Dorothy Zbornak, played by Bea Arthur on the long-running TV sitcom The Golden Girls
- Doll Tearsheet, also referred to as "Mistress Dorothy", a prostitute in Shakespeare's play Henry IV, Part 2
- Dot Branning, character on the British television soap opera EastEnders
- R. Dorothy Wayneright, female android in the anime series The Big O
- Dorothy Von Gale, character in the Netflix series, Hilda

== See also ==
- Dorothea (disambiguation)
- Dorothee (given name)
- Dorothy Mae
