= Dorothy Richards =

Dorothy Richards may refer to:

- Dorothy Ann Richards (1933–2006), Texas politician
- Dorothy Pilley Richards (1894–1986), Welsh mountaineer
- Dorothy Burney Richards (1894–1985), American conservationist
- Dorothy Richards (writer) (1916–2016), Australian writer
