= Dorothy Rice =

Dorothy Rice may refer to:

- Dorothy P. Rice (1922–2017), American health statistician
- Dorothy Rice Sims (1889–1960), American sportswoman, aviator, bridge player, artist, and journalist
- Dorothy Vicary (1932–2009), English novelist who wrote A Secret at Sprayle under the name Dorothy Mary Rice
