= Dorothy Porter (disambiguation) =

Dorothy Porter (1954–2008) was an Australian poet.

Dorothy Porter may also refer to:

- Dorothy B. Porter (1905–1995), American librarian
- Dorothy Germain Porter (1924–2012), American golfer
- Dorothy McMillan, née Porter (1943–2021), British literary scholar
