= Dorothy Mae =

Given name

Dorothy Mae is a given name. People with this given name include:

- Dorothy Mae Kilgallen, American writer and game show contestant (1913–1965)
- Dorothy Mae Richardson, American community activist (1922–1991)
- Dorothy Mae Robathan (1898–1991), American classicist and philologist
- Dorothy Mae Stang, American nun murdered in Brazil (1931–2005)
- Dorothy Mae Taylor, American politician (1928–2000)

== See also ==
- Dorothy (given name)
- Dorothy Mae Apartment-Hotel fire
