= Dorothy Morrison =

Dorothy Morrison may refer to:

- Dorothy Morrison (actress) (1919–2017), African-American child actress
- Dorothy Combs Morrison (born 1944), American gospel music singer
- Dorothy Morrison (author) (born 1955), American writer and teacher of magic, Wicca and Neo-Paganism
