= Dorothy Meigs Eidlitz =

American photographer and patron of the arts

Dorothy Meigs Eidlitz (1891–1976) was an American photographer, arts patron and women's rights advocate.

== Early life ==
She attended Vassar College, graduating in 1914. In 1915, as a result of a study she had done for the Juvenile Protection Association of Philadelphia, a division specifically for women and girls was established in the Philadelphia court. Eidlitz did graduate work at the University of Pennsylvania and at Columbia University. She became a member of the American Academy of Political Science and the Academy of Political and Social Sciences. She lived in Japan for a time, and was the president of the Kobe Women's Club. While president, she worked to lessen the suicide rate among young girls in Kobe.

For over 35 years, she was a summer resident of St. Andrew, New Brunswick. She was married to Ernest Frederick Eidlitz.

Her personal papers are held in the American Heritage Center at the University of Wyoming.

== Photography ==
Eidlitz began her creative career as an amateur photographer, but would go on to exhibit her photographs professionally. In 1960 she was included in the exhibition Photography in the Fine Arts II at the Houston Museum of Fine Arts.

Eidlitz was a fellow of the Royal Photographic Society of Great Britain and the Photographic Society of America. Her work is included in the collection of the National Gallery of Canada and in the Brooklyn Museum.

== Arts patronage ==
Eidlitz founded a center for artists in St. Andrews, New Brunswick named the Sunbury Shores Arts and Nature Centre. The intention of the center was to connect artists with nature in a retreat setting. She was also an art collector. During her life and after her death, she donated works to museum collections, sometimes under the name of her eponymous foundation.

== Personal life ==
Dorothy Meigs was married to Ernest F. Eidlitz (died 1959), a building trade counselor in Riverdale, N.Y. Together they had three daughters.

She died in her home at Winter Park, Florida, on October 26, 1976.
