= Dorothy Proctor =

Canadian author and activist

Dorothy Proctor is a Canadian author and activist noted for drawing attention to scientific experimentation on Canadian prisoners.

== Biography ==
Proctor was born in Cape Breton Island in Nova Scotia. In 1961, she was sentenced to three years at the Prison for Women (Kingston) in Kingston, Ontario after being convicted of robbery as a teenager. She escaped from the facility on two occasions. After the second escape, Proctor alleges she became a subject in a prison psychology experiment involving the administration of electroshock therapy, sensory deprivation, and LSD. She described the experience as akin to Dante's Inferno.

In 1994, Proctor published her autobiography, Chameleon: The Lives of Dorothy Proctor, in collaboration with Fred Rosen, a professor of journalism at Hofstra University. In it she described being involved in prostitution and the drug trade from a young age. She wrote of working with the Royal Canadian Mounted Police and "claims to have played a major role in breaking up Chinese, Jamaican and Europe-to-Canada drug-smuggling rings and exposing corrupt Mounties", as well as infiltrating the Mafia and a Sikh terrorist cell.

Proctor sued Correctional Service Canada in 1995 for Can$5 million in damages. She testified that "she was targeted by researchers because she was viewed as a 'throwaway'", and that her treatment in prison had resulted in a drug addiction and brain damage. Although Proctor's suit was ultimately settled out of court in 2002, it led to significant media attention on the issue, and a number of former inmates at both the women's prison and the Kingston Penitentiary came forward with similar claims, along with allegations that they had been the subject of clinical pharmaceutical trials. Ultimately, hundreds of prisoners were found to have been subjected to scientific experimentation in Canadian prisons through the 1960s and 1970s.
