= Dorothy Hendee =

Colorado state legislator

Dorothy Hendee (died February 2003) was a Republican state legislator in Colorado. She was the only woman to serve in the Colorado House of Representatives in 1943 and 1944 session. Hendee sat on various committees and chaired the Committee of the Whole.

Mrs. Cass Hendee had three children and lived in Denver.
