= Dorothy Marshall (historian) =

English social historian

Dorothy Marshall (26 March 1900 – 13 February 1994) was an English social historian.

She was educated at Preston grammar school and Girton College, Cambridge, where her tutor was Eileen Power. She researched her PhD at the London School of Economics. In 1926 it was published as The English Poor in the Eighteenth Century. Marshall worked at Bedford College, Durham University and finally Cardiff University, where one of her pupils was Roy Jenkins. In his memoirs, Jenkins wrote: "I think her teaching may have been crucial. I desperately needed coaching in the writing of Oxford-style history essays. Even she could not get me a scholarship, but with her help I secured in March 1938 my entry to Balliol".

== Works ==
- The English Poor in the Eighteenth Century (London: George Routledge & Sons, 1926).
- English People in the Eighteenth Century (London: Longmans, Green & Co., 1956).
- Eighteenth Century England (London: Longmans, Green & Co., 1962).
- Lord Melbourne (London: Weidenfeld & Nicolson, 1975).
