= Dorothy Rutka =

American artist

- Born: 1907; Grand Rivers, MI
- Died: 1985 (aged 77–78); Shaker Heights, OH

Dorothy Rutka (1907–1985) was an American artist. She is known for her intaglio prints from the Depression era.

== Early life ==
Rutka was born in Grand Rivers, Michigan. She studied at the Cleveland School of Art from 1926 to 1929.

== Career ==
In 1931 Rutka travelled through Europe for 7 months. Upon returning to the U.S., she took a job as an illustrator and writer for publication, Bystander. Rutka took part in the Works Progress Administration Federal Art Project No. 1. in 1936. Her intaglio prints from the Depression era are well known. During the 1930s through the 1960s, she exhibited her work nationally in museums and galleries. Rutka's works and exhibitions were reviewed in The Cushing Daily Citizen, the Great Falls Tribune, The Cincinnati Enquirer, among other publications.

Rutka became active again in the 1980s in the Cleveland, Ohio area.

== Personal life ==
After graduation, Rutka married Jack Kennon, who worked for the Cleveland News as a political editor. In 1960 she married newspaper editor Philip Porter. In 1985 the couple were killed by Ted Soke and his son Donald, both of whom were strangers who had invaded the Porter home in Shaker Heights, Ohio.

== Collections ==
Her work is included in the collections of the Smithsonian American Art Museum, the Metropolitan Museum of Art, the Montana Museum of Art and Culture, the Fine Arts Museums of San Francisco, the Art Institute of Chicago, the Illinois State Museum, and the Cleveland Museum of Art
