= Dorothy Habel =

American historian of Ancient Roman art

Dorothy Metzger Habel is an American historian of Ancient Roman art, currently a Distinguished Professor at the University of Tennessee.
