= Dorothy Hoffman =

American engineer

Dorothy M Hoffman
- Born: 12 September 1915; New York City
- Died: 13 December 1996 (aged 81)
- Education: Rensselaer Polytechnic Institute
- Occupation: engineer

Dorothy M. Hoffman (September 12, 1915 – December 13, 1996) was an American chemical engineer. In 1974 she became the first woman to be elected president of American Vacuum Society and the first woman to serve as president of any scientific society in the USA.

== Early life ==
She was born in New York City and attended City University of New York. Trained as a concert pianist, she performed at the Academy of Music in Philadelphia. Dorothy Hoffman got her B.S. in chemical engineering from Rensselaer Polytechnic Institute in 1947 and an MS in chemical engineering from Bucknell University in 1948.

== Career ==
Hoffman's technical expertise was in thin-film technology. Her first technical job was at General Electric, tasked with discovering what was causing spots on dishes cleaned in Hotpoint dishwashers.

She and her husband Earl soon moved to Philadelphia, where she worked for International Resistance Co. as a research engineer before being promoted to head of process development. Hoffman played a significant role in the development of evaporated-metal-film resistors during this time.

In 1961 she became the first woman to be invited to a membership in the Engineers' Club of Philadelphia.

She joined the RCA David Sarnoff Research Laboratory in 1962 as a member of the Technical Staff, working there until her retirement in 1994. At Sarnoff Labs, she was in charge of the Thin Film Technology Service Group which developed evaporative coatings used on solar cells, optical video discs, kinescope parts and optical wave guides. She was awarded the RCA Laboratories Outstanding Achievement Award in 1968 and the Video Disc Achievement Award in 1973. Her teaching seminars, her publications and patents made lasting contributions to advancing the development and implementation of thin film technology.

At her retirement in 1990, she was the Head of Thin Film Laboratory at David Sarnoff Research Center in Penns Neck, where she worked for 28 years.

== Society of Women Engineers ==
Dorothy Hoffman was an active member of the Society of Women Engineers (SWE) at a local and national levels, serving on their board of trustees from 1980 to 1989. She was elected a SWE Fellow in 1984 and provided funding for several SWE scholarships and the development of new career guidance programs in her will.

== American Vacuum Society ==
In 1974 she became the first woman to be elected president of American Vacuum Society and the first woman to serve as president of any scientific society in the US.

After her retirement, she continued to volunteer at American Vacuum Society. In 1993 she started the effort to put together a reference handbook for vacuum scientists and engineers to commemorate the 40th anniversary of the society. This resulted in publication of the popular "Handbook of Vacuum Science and Technology" by Academic Press, of which she is the lead co-editor.

In 2002, the American Vacuum Society established the Dorothy M. and Earl S. Hoffman student award "to recognize and encourage excellence in continuing graduate studies in the sciences and technologies of interest to AVS."

== Publications ==
- Hoffman, Dorothy M (1979), "Operation and maintenance of a diffusion-pumped vacuum system", Journal of Vacuum Science and Technology, 16 (1), AVS: 71–74, Bibcode:1979JVST...16...71H, doi:10.1116/1.569870
