= Dorothy Moore (disambiguation) =

Dorothy Moore may refer to:

- Dorothy Moore (born 1946), American blues and gospel singer
- Dorothy Rudd Moore (1940–2022), African-American composer and music educator
- Debbie Moore (born 1946), model and businesswoman
- Dorothy Dury (c.1613–1664), Anglo-Irish writer on education
- Dorothea Moore (author) (1881–1933), British author
