= Dorothy Beckett =

American scientist

Dorothy Beckett, Ph.D.
- Occupations: scientist; biophysicist
- Title: Director of the Division of Biophysics, Biomedical Technology, and Computational Biosciences (BBCB) of NIH

Dorothy Beckett is an American biophysicist and director of the BBCB division of NIH.

== Education and career ==
Beckett did her undergraduate studies in chemistry at Barnard College at Columbia University. She then continued her scientific career at the University of Illinois at Urbana-Champaign, earning a Ph.D. in biochemistry. She performed postdoctoral research at the Massachusetts Institute of Technology studying with Bob Sauer and Johns Hopkins University studying with Gary Ackers.

Prior to assuming the division of Biophysics, Biomedical Technology, and Computational Biosciences BBCB directorship at the National Institutes of Health (NIH) in 2021, Beckett was a faculty member in the Chemistry and Biochemistry Department at the University of Maryland, College Park. At the University of Maryland she taught classes and directed a research program focused on biophysical chemistry, protein function, and biological regulation. Beckett also served the scientific community as the president of the Biophysical Society from 2014 to 2015.

== Research ==
Beckett has contributed to scientific research at the Institute for Physical Science and Technology and the Department of Chemistry and Biochemistry at the University of Maryland in numerous areas: bioterrorism; forensics related to biochemistry and biotechnology; advances in therapeutic agents for treatment of some diseases; funding of basic scientific research; regulation of gene expression, protein structure and function; and analytical biochemistry.

== Awards ==
Her honors include a DuPont Young Professorship Award, a distinguished professor award from Hamilton College and an NIH postdoctoral fellowship.
