= Dorothy Deming =

Nurse and writer

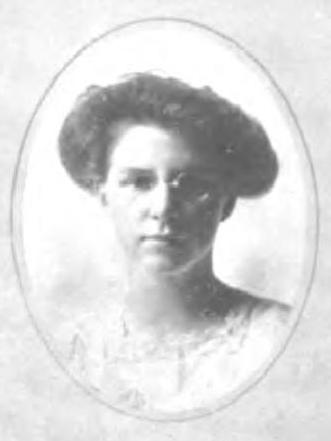
- Born: 1893; New Haven, Connecticut
- Died: 1972 (aged 78–79); Winter Park, Florida
- Occupations: Nurse, writer

Dorothy Deming (1893–1972) was an American nurse and writer who wrote the 'Penny Marsh' books on public health nursing as a career.

== Biography ==
Dorothy Deming was born in New Haven, Connecticut on 8 June 1893 to Clarence Deming and Mary Bryan Whiting. She was educated in Vassar College where she graduated with a Bachelor of Arts in 1914. She went on to attend Yale before graduating from the Presbyterian Hospital School of Nursing in New York in 1920. Deming was a student nurse during the flu epidemic of 1918. She also spent time studying at the Henry Street Visiting Nurse Association.

In 1924 Deming was the first director of the Holyoke Visiting Nurse association and went on to be the assistant to the director of the National Organization for Public Health Nursing in 1927 and then to the director of Public Health Nursing from 1935 to 1942. Deming finished in the American Public Health Association from 1942 to 1952.

Deming wrote a series of books aimed at enticing girls into becoming nurses and her series were so successful that schools introduced clubs for fans. She also wrote on the history of nursing. Her best known series was based around 'Penny Marsh'.

Deming died in January 1972 in Winter Park, Florida.

== Bibliography ==
- Sharon's nursing diary
- Anne Snow Mountain Nurse
- Penny Marsh, R.N.,: Director of nurses
- Hilda Baker,: School nurse
- Linda Kent,: Student nurse
- Nursing assignment in El Salvador
- The Practical Nurse
- The Settlement of the Connecticut Towns
- Penny Marsh
- Penny Marsh, Supervisor of Public Health Nurses
- Penny Marsh Finds Adventure in Public Health Nursing
- Home Nursing
- Penny Marsh, public health nurse
- Sue Morris: Sky Nurse
- Penny and Pam: Nurse and Cadet
