= Dorothy Wilson =

Dorothy Wilson may refer to:

- Dorothy Clarke Wilson (1904–2003), American author and playwright
- Dorothy Wilson (actress) (1909–1998), American film actress
