= Dorothy Page =

Dorothy Page may refer to:

- Dorothy G. Page (1921–1989), known as "Mother of the Iditarod Trail Sled Dog Race"
- Dorothy Page (actress) (1904–1961), American actress, dubbed "The Singing Cowgirl"
- Dorothy Page (historian), New Zealand historian and academic
