= Dorothy O'Connor =

American photographer and installation artist (born 1970)

- Born: 1970
- Education: Georgia State University, Creative Circus
- Known for: Photography and installation art
- Movement: Contemporary art
- Website: https://www.dorothyoconnor.com

Dorothy O'Connor is a photographer and installation artist, best known for her hand-crafted scenes that combine elements of still-life, portraiture, landscape, and performance.

== Early life and education ==
O'Connor was educated at Georgia State University and received a BA degree in English Literature, with a minor in Studio Art in 1996.

At age 30 she returned to school to train as a photographer at the Creative Circus in Atlanta. After graduation, she worked assisting commercial photographers and worked in various roles in the commercial realm.

== Career ==
While still working in commercial photography, O'Connor began to build life-sized, fantastical sets, or "scenes", in her garage that she would then photograph. The constructed "scenes" are all handcrafted by O'Connor and can take up to six months to complete. Once the construction is completed, the "scenes" are captured with an 8×10 camera on film.

In 2008, O'Connor's work began to incorporate performance and the constructed installation scenes were open to the public to view in the style of a tableau vivant or "living picture".

== Work ==
=== Major exhibitions ===
In 2012, O'Connor received a Flux grant for her installation "Ceiling of Birds" to be shown in Flux Night, a large public art event in downtown Atlanta.

In 2013, she was artist in residence at Cheekwood Botanical Garden and Museum of Art in Nashville where she built and presented her installation, “Shelter.”

In 2019, thirteen of her photographs, created between 2006 and 2017, were exhibited at the Museum of Contemporary Art of Georgia for the solo exhibition "Dorothy O'Connor: Scenes".

=== Public collections ===
O'Connor's work is part of the permanent collections at the Museum of Contemporary Art of Georgia, Cheekwood Botanical Garden and Museum of Art, and the Center for Fine Art Photography.

=== Awards and nominations ===
O'Connor has received grants from Possible Futures, FLUX and the Forward Arts Foundation and Art on the Beltline to present her installations as public art.
