= Dorothy Buchanan =

Dorothy Buchanan can refer to:

- Dorothy Donaldson Buchanan (1899–1985), first woman to join the Institution of Civil Engineers
- Dorothy Buchanan (composer) (born 1945), New Zealand composer
