= Dorothy Espelage =

American psychologist

Dorothy Espelage is an American psychologist. She is the William C. Friday Distinguished Professor of Education at the University of North Carolina (Chapel Hill), and an international expert in bullying, youth aggression, and teen dating violence. She has authored several books including Bullying in North American Schools, Bullying Prevention and Intervention: Realistic Strategies for Schools, Handbook of Bullying in Schools: an International Perspective, and Bullying Victimization and Internalizing Problems of Foreign-Born and U.S.-Born Latin/Hispanic and Asian Adolescents in the United States: The Moderating Role of Parental Monitoring. She also works with the Senate and Congress, particularly by advising them on harassment prevention issues.

== Education ==
Espelage grew up in Virginia and received her bachelor's degree in psychology from Virginia Commonwealth University. She then received a master's degree in clinical psychology from Radford University before receiving her PhD in counseling psychology from Indiana University Bloomington. From 1997 to 2016 she worked at the University of Illinois Urbana-Champaign, where she held the Edward William and Jane Marr Gutgsell professorship in educational psychology. In 2016, she accepted a position in the department of psychology at the University of Florida.

== Professional life ==
Espelage has appeared as a speaker and consultant in numerous media outlets such as CNN, Anderson Cooper, Oprah, Huffington Post, and USA Today. Recently, she was invited to the White House in 2011 as a part of the Bullying Summit to discuss policy decisions regarding aggression in schools. Likewise, she was awarded the lifetime achievement award from the American Psychological Association's Division 17 for Counseling Psychology. As the author of over 200 publications, Espelage is known for her work in bullying, homophobic teasing, sexual harassment, and teen dating violence. In particular, her research focuses on translating empirical findings into prevention and intervention programming. As a result, Espelage regularly speaks at conferences and schools to teachers, parents, and children about why bullying occurs, why bystanders do not assist victims, and what individuals can do to respond to stop school bullying, harassment, and violence.
