= Dorothy Gordon =

Dorothy Gordon may refer to:

- Dorothy Gordon (British actress) (1924-2013)
- Dorothy Gordon (Australian actress) (1891–1985), Australian actress, columnist, and radio broadcaster (also known as 'Andrea')
- Dorothy Gordon (activist), Ghanaian technology activist and development specialist
