= Dorothy Hawksley =

British artist

Dorothy Webster Hawksley (1884–1 July 1970) was a British artist who painted portraits, figure subjects and landscapes, mainly using watercolour or tempera.

== Biography ==
Hawksley was born in London and studied at St John's Wood School of Art and then at the Royal Academy Schools, winning awards at both including a silver medal and the Landseer Scholarship at the latter. She taught privately for many years after graduation and exhibited at several galleries and venues. These included the Royal Academy and the Fine Art Society in London, with the Society of Women Artists, at the Walker Art Gallery in Liverpool and at the Paris Salon where she won a silver medal in 1931. The publisher Heinemann commissioned Hawksley to design a number of dust jackets in the early 1930s.

Her work is included in the collections of the National Gallery of Canada, the Witt Library, the Birmingham Museums and Art Gallery and the National Portrait Gallery, London. Three of Hawksley's pictures were included in The Last Romantics exhibition held at the Barbican Art Gallery in 1989 and the Mass Gallery held a retrospective exhibition in 2005.

Hawksley produced the only portrait of the writer Charlotte Mew; it was gifted to the National Portrait Gallery in 1947.
