= Dorothy Klenke Nash =

American neurosurgeon

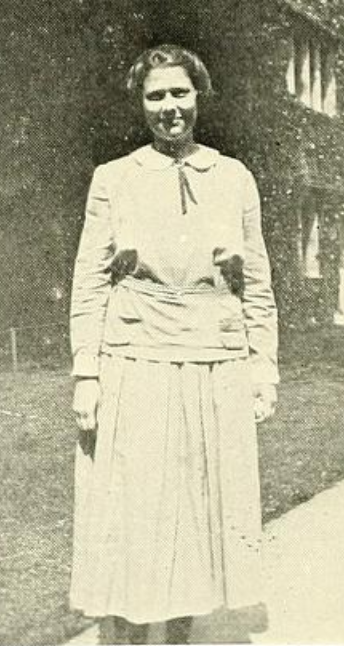
- Dorothy Klenke, from the 1921 yearbook of Bryn Mawr College
- Born: Dorothy Amelia Klenke; October 24, 1898; New Jersey
- Died: March 5, 1976 (aged 77); Pittsburgh, Pennsylvania
- Occupation: Neurosurgeon

Dorothy Klenke Nash (October 24, 1898 – March 5, 1976) was an American surgeon based in Pittsburgh, Pennsylvania. She was considered the first American woman to become a neurosurgeon, and the only American woman neurosurgeon from 1928 to 1960.

== Early life and education ==
Dorothy Amelia Klenke was born in New Jersey and raised in New York City, the daughter of William Henry Klenke Sr. and Gertrude Amelia Chatillon Klenke. Her father was a lawyer on Wall Street. Her sister M. Amelia Klenke was a Dominican sister and literary scholar who won a Guggenheim Fellowship in 1950, to study in France.

Klenke graduated from the Spence School in 1917 and from Bryn Mawr College in 1921. She earned her medical degree at Columbia University College of Physicians and Surgeons in 1925. After she served a surgical residency at Bellevue Hospital, she became the first woman in the United States to specialize in neurosurgery, and was said to be the only woman neurosurgeon in the United States from 1928 to 1960.

== Career ==
Klenke practiced medicine in New York City until she moved to Pittsburgh with her husband in 1936. She became senior surgeon and head of neurology at St. Margaret's Hospital in Pittsburgh in 1942, and served on the staffs of the Western Pennsylvania Hospital and the Children’s Hospital of Pittsburgh. She also taught neurosurgery at the University of Pittsburgh, and served as a delegate to the state medical society, representing the Allegheny County Medical Society. She was president of the Pittsburgh Neuropsychiatric Society in 1957 and 1958. She retired in 1965.

In 1953 Nash was named a Distinguished Daughter of Pennsylvania, and in 1957 she was named Woman of the Year by the Pittsburgh Post-Gazette, and given the Minerva Award by the Mercy Hospital Auxiliary. She was a founder and leader of United Cerebral Palsy of Western Pennsylvania. She was chair of Allegheny County's Mental Health Week in 1960, and spoke about community care: "If patients can be treated in the community, we hope to prevent future, severe illnesses," she explained.

== Personal life ==
Dorothy Klenke married businessman Charles B. Nash in 1931. They had two children, George and Patricia. She died in 1976, aged 77 years, at a nursing home in Pittsburgh.
