= Dorothy Nolte =

American writer and family counselor

- Born: Dorothy Louise McDaniel; January 12, 1924; Los Angeles, California
- Died: November 6, 2005 (aged 81)
- Occupation: Writer
- Known for: Her child-rearing book called: Children Learn What They Live: Parenting to Inspire Values
- Notable work: The poem called: Children Learn What They Live
- Spouses: Durwood Law (div.); Claude Nolte
- Children: 2 daughters, 1 son; 1 stepson; 8 grandchildren; six great-grandchildren; 1 great-great grandchild
- Website: childrenlearnwhattheylive.com

Dorothy Law Nolte (January 12, 1924 – November 6, 2005) was an American writer and family counselor.

== Biography ==
Dorothy Law Nolte was born in Los Angeles, California, January 12, 1924.

She wrote a poem on childrearing, "Children Learn What They Live", for a weekly family column for The Torrance Herald in 1954. The poem was widely circulated by readers as well as distributed to millions of new parents by a maker of baby formula. She copyrighted it in 1972, and in 1998 expanded it into a book, co-authored with Rachel Harris, Children Learn What They Live: Parenting to Inspire Values. At the time of Nolte's death, the book had more than 3 million copies in print worldwide and had been translated into 18 languages, according to its publisher, Workman Publishing. Nolte and Harris also collaborated on Teenagers Learn What They Live: Parenting to Inspire Integrity and Independence (Workman Publishing, 2002).

With her second husband, Claude Nolte, Nolte also co-authored the book Wake Up in Bed, Together! A Handbook for Sexual Repatterning (Stein & Day, 1975).

Nolte died of cancer at the age of 81 at her home in Rancho Santa Margarita, California.

== Legacy ==
Nolte's family is currently managing her numerous unpublished works. In 2019, they launched the website ChildrenLearnWhatTheyLive.com containing historical information, new poems, her books available for sale, and parenting resource information. Also compiled by her family in 2019, is an eBook entitled, Living With Children: A collection of inspirational poems to guide us along the path of parenting by Dorothy Law Nolte.

== Selected works ==
- Dorothy Law Nolte PhD, Rachel Harris LCSW, PhD. Children Learn What They Live: Parenting to Inspire Values. Workman Publishing Company, 1998. ISBN 978-0-7611-0919-8
- Dorothy Law Nolte PhD, Rachel Harris LCSW, PhD. Teenagers Learn What They Live: Parenting to Inspire Integrity & Independence. Workman Publishing Company, 2002. ISBN 978-0-7611-2138-1
- Dorothy Law Nolte PhD. Living With Children: A Collection of Inspirational Poems to Guide Us Along the Path of Parenting. eBook Partnerships, 2019. ISBN 978-1-913-22756-2
