= Dorothy McClendon =

Microbiologist

- Born: December 21, 1924; Minden, Louisiana, U.S.
- Died: May 17, 2013 (aged 88); Kansas, U.S.
- Education: A & I State University
- Employer: TACOM

Dorothy V. McClendon (December 21, 1924 – May 17, 2013) was an American microbiologist and one of the first Black women to lead a scientific division in the U.S. military. As chief of the Environmental Microbiology Division at the U.S. Army Tank-Automotive Command (TACOM), she played a critical role in protecting military fuel systems and materials from microbial contamination. Her research into microbiologically influenced corrosion helped transform the way the military and industry approached fuel storage, and her contributions to biological defense remain relevant today.

== Early life and education ==
McClenden was born in Minden, Louisiana on December 21, 1924 She moved from Minden to Detroit, Michigan with her mother and older sister Melba. McClendon's early education was shaped by the encouragement of her mother, who pushed her to pursue academic excellence. McClendon applied and was accepted to the competitive Cass Technical High School, known for its rigorous academic and technical training, and excelled there. She went on to attend A & I State University (now Tennessee State University) in Tennessee, earning a Bachelor of Science degree in biology in 1948. Initially, McClendon had aspirations to become a medical doctor, but her growing interest in microbiology led her to shift her focus. During her time at Tennessee A&I, McClendon demonstrated leadership qualities, becoming actively involved in student life. She held leadership roles in the Alpha Chi chapter of Delta Sigma Theta sorority and served on the Sunday School Cabinet. After completing her undergraduate degree, McClendon pursued post-graduate study at various institutions, including Purdue University, Wayne State University, and the University of Detroit. She briefly taught in public schools in Phoenix, Arizona, and Eldorado, Arkansas, before deciding to pursue a career in microbiology. These early experiences helped McClendon gain valuable teaching and leadership experience, which would later serve her well in her groundbreaking work at the U.S. Army Tank-Automotive Command (TACOM).

== Career ==
McClenden's professional career in microbiology began in the 1950s when she joined TACOM in Warren, Michigan. Initially, McClendon worked in the Chemistry Laboratory for one year, where she gained valuable experience in the scientific aspects of military supply and logistics. However, her exceptional skills and growing expertise in microbiology led her to be promoted to the position of supervisor of the Microbiology Laboratory, a position that she held for many years. This marked the beginning of her long and influential career in military microbiology, which would have a lasting impact on both the U.S. military and the field of bio-defense. McClendon became one of the few African American women in her field at the time, breaking barriers in both the military and the scientific community.

At TACOM, McClendon focused on the critical issue of microbial contamination and its effects on military supplies, particularly fuels and lubricants. During this time, the Army faced challenges in preventing the degradation of stored goods, especially in the harsh and varied environments, such as the extreme conditions of the Vietnam War. Microbial growth in fuel could cause major issues, including corrosion in engines, clogging of fuel lines, and even complete equipment failure. The military needed reliable methods to prevent these issues, as any failure in equipment could severely impact operations. McClendon's expertise was key in addressing these problems, as her work aimed to ensure that military materials could withstand the environmental challenges that often led to microbial degradation.

McClendon's work addressed this pain point by developing methods to detect and control microbial contamination in stored fuels and lubricants. She worked on formulating chemical treatments that could effectively prevent microbial growth and protect sensitive military materials from degradation. Her research also led to better testing procedures for assessing microbial contamination, allowing the Army to identify potential problems early and take corrective action before equipment was affected. One of her key contributions was developing ways to detect and mitigate microbiologically influenced corrosion (MIC), a form of damage caused by microbial activity in fuel systems. Her treatments and methodologies extended the life of military equipment and ensured its reliable operations in adverse conditions, contributing to the Army's operational readiness.

Her work at TACOM extended beyond simply solving immediate problems in military logistics. McClendon's research had a broader impact on industries dealing with microbial contamination in fuels and lubricants, influencing sectors such as transportation, manufacturing, and energy. The techniques she developed were adopted in various industries facing similar challenges with microbial growth in stored materials. Her contributions to bio-defense were groundbreaking, and her research continues to be influential in fields that deal with microbial threats to materials today. By the time McClendon retired in 1984, her work had not only helped ensure the reliability of military systems but had also set new standards in the scientific approach to microbial contamination control.

== Personal life ==
Dorothy McClendon never married, focusing her energy on her career and community involvement. Throughout her life, she remained deeply committed to service and giving back, especially through youth ministries, Sunday schools, and scholarship programs. Her work with local Christian schools and organizations highlighted her dedication to mentoring the next generation and fostering educational opportunities for young people, particularly those from underrepresented backgrounds.

McClendon was known for her strong sense of community and for helping others in her personal and professional circles. Her commitment to volunteer work was an extension of the values that shaped her upbringing, and she was recognized for her leadership in various community initiatives. Despite the demands of her professional career, she always made time for these volunteer efforts, underscoring her belief in the power of education and support in shaping the lives of young people.

She spent her later years living in Kansas and continued to engage with her local community. Dorothy McClendon died on May 17, 2013, at the age of 88. Her legacy, both in the scientific community and in her personal contributions, remains an inspiration to many. McClendon's life was a testament to perseverance, dedication, and a lifelong commitment to empowering others, particularly women of color in the sciences.

== Memberships and Awards ==
McClendon was an active member of various professional and community organizations during her career:

- Michigan Society of Professional Engineers
- Detroit Central Business District Association
- Tennessee Agricultural and Industrial State University (now Tennessee State University) - Her alma mater.

She was also recognized in Blacks in Science: Astrophysicist to Zoologist by Hattie Carwell, a publication that features prominent African American scientists and innovators. McClendon was featured on page 44 of the 1977 edition.
