= Dorothy West (disambiguation) =

Dorothy West (1907–1998) was an American novelist and short story writer.

Dorothy West may also refer to:

- Dorothy West (actress) (1891–1980), American actress
- Dottie West (1932–1991), American country music singer
- Dot West, indigenous Australian screenwriter
