= Dorothy Korber =

American journalist

Dorothy Korber is an American journalist. Korber served as a reporter for almost 30 years.

Korber received a bachelor's degree in journalism from Long Beach State University and a master's degree in journalism from the University of California, Los Angeles.

Korber served as political columnist and state capitol reporter for the Long Beach Press-Telegram for 13 years, and also wrote for the Los Angeles Daily News. At the Press-Telegram, Korber covered topics such as Long Beach city government, education, politics, and the 1990 U.S. census.

Korber joined the Sacramento Bee in March 2000. In 2006, Korber and Bee colleague Christina Jewett received the 2006 Excellence in Criminal Justice Reporting Award in the individual article category for their investigative report "Questions Persist Over Jail Health Care," on conditions inside the Sacramento County Main Jail; the pieces led to the creation of an independent oversight agency for the Sheriff's Department. In 2004, with Bee colleague John Hill, she received a George Polk Award for State Reporting for reports on "Chief's Disease," abuses of workers' compensation by California Highway Patrol leadership. In 2008, Korber accepted a buyout in 2008 as part of a wave of layoffs at the Bee.

After leaving the Bee, Korber became principal consultant to the California State Senate Office of Oversight and Outcomes.
