= Dorothy Sherwood =

American burlesque performer

Dorothy O. Sherwood, née Caskey (born February 7, 1908, date of death unknown) was a burlesque dancer and Salvation Army worker who was convicted of first-degree murder for killing her two-year-old son.

== Early life and marriage ==
Sherwood was born in St. Louis, Missouri. She was the third child of Thomas Caskey, a Scotch-Irish foundry worker and his wife Florence Caskey. Her father was married six times and Sherwood was the daughter of his third wife. One of her older siblings died at eighteen months and another at five years of age. Sherwood's mother died when she was nine and she was placed in an orphanage. Salvation Army work, in 1925, followed her period in the orphanage. As a lassie, she wore a red-ribboned bonnet. In this endeavor, she sang gospel hymns in six southern cities for approximately three years. From this job, she moved on to dance in burlesque.

One day she saw an ad offering employment in show business to girls with fair singing voices. She answered the ad and went to work in Chicago, Illinois. In burlesque, she never achieved the prominence of a stripper. Instead, she was always in the back row in the chorus. She married a stagehand, James Sherwood, the electrician of the burlesque company. Her marriage was conducted as a publicity stunt before an audience of burlesque fans during a regular performance. James was from a poor family in Newburgh, New York, a Hudson River town.

When the company broke up, the couple returned to Newburgh. There James found sporadic work as a motion picture operator and Sherwood was employed as a waitress. Their daughter, then age seven, resided with his mother. At that time their other child, Jimmy, was an infant. James had tuberculosis and died in a sanitarium in New York. Afterward, Sherwood became engaged to a minor politician and dry county agent. When she lost her job the engagement was broken. Her landlady evicted her when she could not afford the room and board.

== Crime ==
Sherwood drowned two-year-old Jimmy in Moodna Creek in Newburgh, on August 20, 1935. The case was exceptional, being the only first-degree murder case involving a woman in Orange County, New York history until then.

She carried Jimmy's body to the Newburgh police headquarters, exclaiming it was too hard to make a living for myself and the baby. Her husband died four months earlier.

== Trial and sentence ==
Sherwood, 27, pleaded temporary insanity during her trial for the drowning of Jimmy in January 1936. The jury recommended mercy when it convicted her of first-degree murder. The jury foreman mentioned that she had led a hard life. Trial Judge Jonathan D. Wilson was compelled by New York state law to sentence her to die in the electric chair at Sing Sing. Two defense psychiatrists maintained that Sherwood was insane while two prosecution psychiatrists testified to the contrary. In 1936 all first-degree murder convictions were reviewed by the New York Court of Appeals.

== Appeal and parole ==
The United States War Veterans Association circulated petitions days later urging Governor Herbert Lehman to grant Sherwood an unconditional pardon. She won an appeal for a new trial. The Court of Appeals set aside the first-degree murder conviction on July 8, 1936. She pleaded guilty to the first-degree manslaughter the following September 2 and received a six-to-fifteen-year sentence. She was then 28.

Sherwood was freed on parole on December 27, 1939, after serving three years and three months at the Westfield State Farm (Bedford Hills Correctional Facility for Women) in Bedford Hills, New York. The Salvation Army employed her doing clerical work in one of its institutions. Sherwood was allowed to visit her 11-year-old daughter, Dorothy May, who resided in Newburgh.
