= Dorothy Varian =

American painter

Dorothy Varian (April 26, 1895 – 1985) was an American painter in New York City and Woodstock, New York, who worked primarily with watercolor and oil painting.

== Early life ==
Varian was born on April 26, 1895, in New York City to Eugene W. and Helen Estelle Varian. She dropped out of high school at fifteen and entered Cooper Union, from which she later graduated with honors. Varian then attended the Art Students League of New York, where she won first and second prize in a local art contest sponsored by movie producer William Fox.

== Exhibitions and collections ==
Over the course of her career, Varian held fifteen solo exhibitions and received many awards, including the Kuniyoshi Award in 1975. She exhibited at the studio galleries of the Whitney Museum in 1928, and at the Museum of Modern Art, New York in 1936. Her work is included in the collections of the Museum of Modern Art, Newark Museum of Art and the Whitney Museum of American Art. Her personal papers are included in the Smithsonian Archives of American Art.

== Personal life ==
Varian died in 1985 in New York City.
