= Dorothy Marcic =

American dramatist

- Born: Pewaukee, Wisconsin
- Occupations: Educator, playwright, author
- Website: DrDorothy.com

Dorothy Marcic is an American educator, playwright, and author.

== Background ==
Marcic was born in Wisconsin and grew up on a dairy farm in Pewaukee, graduating from Waukesha High School. Marcic holds a Bachelor's degree in radio, television, and film from University of Wisconsin-Madison, along with graduate degrees in Educational Media and in Public Health from the University of Pittsburgh. She also holds a Doctorate in Organizational Behavior from University of Massachusetts Amherst and a Master of Fine Arts in Creative Writing from SUNY, Stony Brook. She is an active member of the Baha’I Faith.

== Career ==
Dr. Marcic is a professor at Columbia University and a former professor at Vanderbilt University’s Owen Graduate School of Management.

Marcic was a Fulbright Scholar at the University of Economics, Prague and served as an advisor to the United States Ambassador of the Czech Republic. She was also a delegate to the UN Commission on the Status of Women the United Nations and an Economic and Social Develop Summit in Copenhagen. As a graduate student, Marcic was a production assistant on Mister Rogers’ Neighborhood.

Marcic is the author of 18 books including Managing with the Wisdom of Love, Understanding Management, Love Lift Me Higher, and RESPECT: Women and Popular Music, along with other research studies and scholarly articles. Marcic has also written a true crime book about her uncle's murder, With One Shot: Family Murder and a Search for Justice.

She is the playwright of several plays including Intentions, based on a true story of an Iranian immigrant. Marcic also researched the depiction of women in popular music to write the musicals, RESPECT, which has played 3400 performances in 72 cities, This One's for the Girls and SISTAS, which played Off-Broadway in New York City for over six years.

Marcic is the writer and story creator of three short films, Great Expectations, Spillings, and Last Resort. She has appeared on CMT, C-SPAN, and Bravo Network.
