= Dorothy Scharf =

Dorothy Scharf (1942–2004) was a reclusive art collector who left 51 valuable paintings to the Courtauld Institute in her will. Her collection, containing works by such eminent artists as John Constable and Thomas Gainsborough, covers the "Golden Age" of English painting. Perhaps the most famous work in the collection is Margate Pier by J. M. W. Turner, once owned by US President Franklin D. Roosevelt. The artworks were first exhibited in October 2007.
