= Dorothy Ooko =

Kenyan activist and technology professional

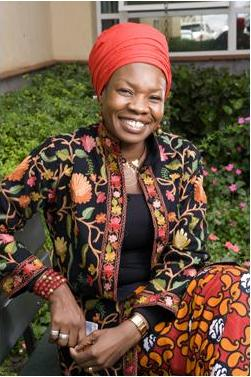

Africa PR Lead at Google

Personal details
- Born: Nairobi, Kenya
- Education: Fort Hall Road Primary School

Dorothy Akinyi Ooko is a Kenyan activist and technology professional.

Born in Mater Hospital, Nairobi, She attended Fort Hall Road Primary School in her home city and then Pangani Girls High School for her "O" Level and completed her "A" Level at Alliance Girls' High School. After her "A" levels she went to Université de Haute Bretagne in France, where she studied Lettres Modernes before switching to English Language. She returned to Kenya and pursued her Bachelor of Education (French and English in Literature) from 1985 to 1988. She taught at Mukumu Girls' for a short stint and then received a scholarship to do a Masters in French from Kenya University. She also has a Masters in International Business Administration from United States International University (USIU).

Ooko was the Head of Communications and Public Affairs, Africa at Google based in Nairobi until December 2024. Prior to that, she was working for Nokia in Nairobi as well. She is the Co-Founder of WS&O

== Achievements ==
Ooko spearheaded the lobbying for the removal of Value Added Tax (VAT) on mobile phones in Kenya. As part of the Nokia East and Southern Africa team, she worked with the LG team, Safaricom and mobile handset distributors.
