= Dorothy Venning =

British artist (1885-1942)

Dorothy Mary Venning (15 January 1885 – 1942) was a British artist and sculptor.

== Biography ==
Venning was born at Camberwell in London where her father was a school master. She was educated at the Mary Datchelor School on Camberwell Grove before attending the Bishop Otter College in Chichester. Venning produced bronze sculptures and also painted portraits and miniatures. Between 1916 and 1936 she exhibited both sculptures and miniatures at the Royal Academy in London.
