= Dorothy Motubatse-Hounkpatin =

South African politician

Member of the National Assembly
- In office June 1999 – May 2009

Personal details
- Born: 15 November 1957 (age 68)
- Citizenship: South Africa
- Party: African National Congress

Semamanyane Dorothy Motubatse-Hounkpatin (born 15 November 1957) is a South African politician who represented the African National Congress (ANC) in the National Assembly from 1999 to 2009, gaining election in 1999 and 2004. She additionally served as the parliamentary counsellor to Phumzile Mlambo-Ngcuka after Mlambo-Ngcuka was appointed as Deputy President of South Africa in 2005.
