= Dorothy Danforth Compton =

American philanthropist

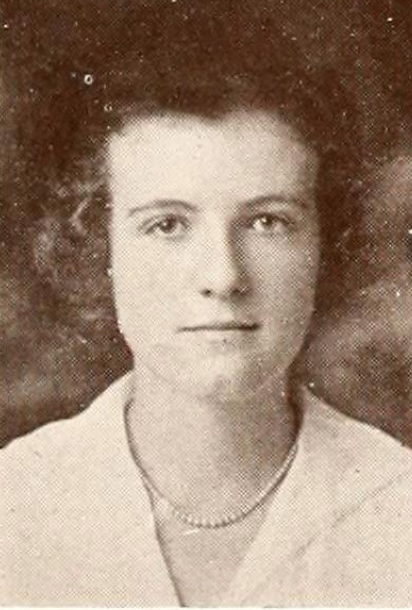
- Born: July 30, 1895
- Died: May 19, 1974 (aged 78); Scarsdale, New York
- Resting place: St. Louis, Missouri; Mount Auburn Cemetery; Cambridge, Massachusetts, USA
- Education: Vassar College, 1917
- Known for: Trustee at Danforth Foundation and of College Careers of Westchester
- Spouse: Randolph P. Compton
- Parent: William H. Danforth

Dorothy Danforth Compton (July 30, 1895 in St. Louis, Missouri – May 19, 1974 in Scarsdale, US) was an American philanthropist.

Danforth Compton was the daughter of William H. Danforth, founder of the Ralston Purina Company and the Danforth Foundation, and Adda Bush Danforth. She graduated from Vassar College in 1917.

In 1917, she married Randolph P. Compton, an investment banker at Kidder, Peabody & Company. Together, they had four children, of which one died from...?

== Philanthropy ==
The Compton family established the John Parker Compton Memorial Fund at Princeton University for world order studies, the W. Danforth Compton Memorial Fund for. fellowships at the Massachusetts Institute of Technology School of Architecture, and endowed faculty chairmanship at the University of Virginia.

In 1957, Danforth Compton established the Fund for Peace with her husband as a think tank and foundation primarily focused on the most pressing issue of the Cold War era: nuclear non-proliferation. Their son, James R. Compton, continued his parents’ legacy, serving as President Emeritus of The Fund for Peace until his death in 2006.

In 2025, the Compton Foundation will have spent its entire endowment and officially closed the organization.
