= Dorothy Knowles (disambiguation) =

Dorothy Knowles (1927–2023) was a Canadian artist.

Dorothy Knowles or Knollys (same pronunciation) may also refer to:

- Dorothy Knowles (academic) (1906–2010), British academic
- Dorothy Knollys (c.1524–1605), English noblewoman
