= Dorothy Summers =

Dorothy Summers may refer to:

- Dorothy Summers (gymnast) (born 1941), British Olympic gymnast
- Dorothy Summers (actress) in It's That Man Again
- Dorothy Summers, character in ''1,000 Dollars a Minute
