= Dorothy Ruíz Martínez =

Mexican-American engineer

Dorothy Ruíz-Martínez is a Mexican-American aerospace engineer who works for National Aeronautics and Space Administration (NASA) at the Lyndon B. Johnson Space Center in Houston, Texas.

== Biography ==
She was born in Texas, and was raised by her grandparents in Matehuala, San Luis Potosí, Mexico, until she moved to the United States at age 16. During her childhood, she witnessed the tragedy of the Space Shuttle Challenger on television; this event fueled her curiosity about rockets and aerospace engineering.

=== Education ===
She went to high school in the state of Texas, attended the University of Oklahoma, and transferred to Texas A&M University in College Station, Texas, graduating with a B.S. degree in Aerospace Engineering.

=== NASA ===
In 1998, she interned via the Langley Aerospace Research Summer Scholars program at NASA Langley Research Center in Virginia.

After graduating from college, she became an instructor for the GNC & Control Propulsion systems of the Space Shuttle, training flight controllers and astronauts She later worked 12 shuttle missions as a Real-Time Planning Engineer (RPE) contributing along with other engineers and scientist to the final assembly of the International Space Station.

In 2008, she worked in Moscow and at the Russian Mission Control Center as the planning liaison between NASA and the Russian Space Agency. Since March 2013, she worked as a Ground Controller in Mission Control Center, a flight controller position known by the call sign of Houston-GC. The Houston-GC manages the ground communication systems and interfaces between the space vehicles and the earth. Four years later, she became a GC Instructor, and then the GC Training Lead for the Ground Control group. She currently works in the Mission Control Center Systems branch, helping oversee the management and maintenance of the ground systems that support space flight operations.

=== Other projects ===
She volunteered for the Engineers Without Borders, Johnson Space Center Chapter.

== Acknowledgments ==
Her story was included in the book Stories for Rebel Girls (Editorial Planeta) in 2021.
