= Dorothy Drew =

American actress

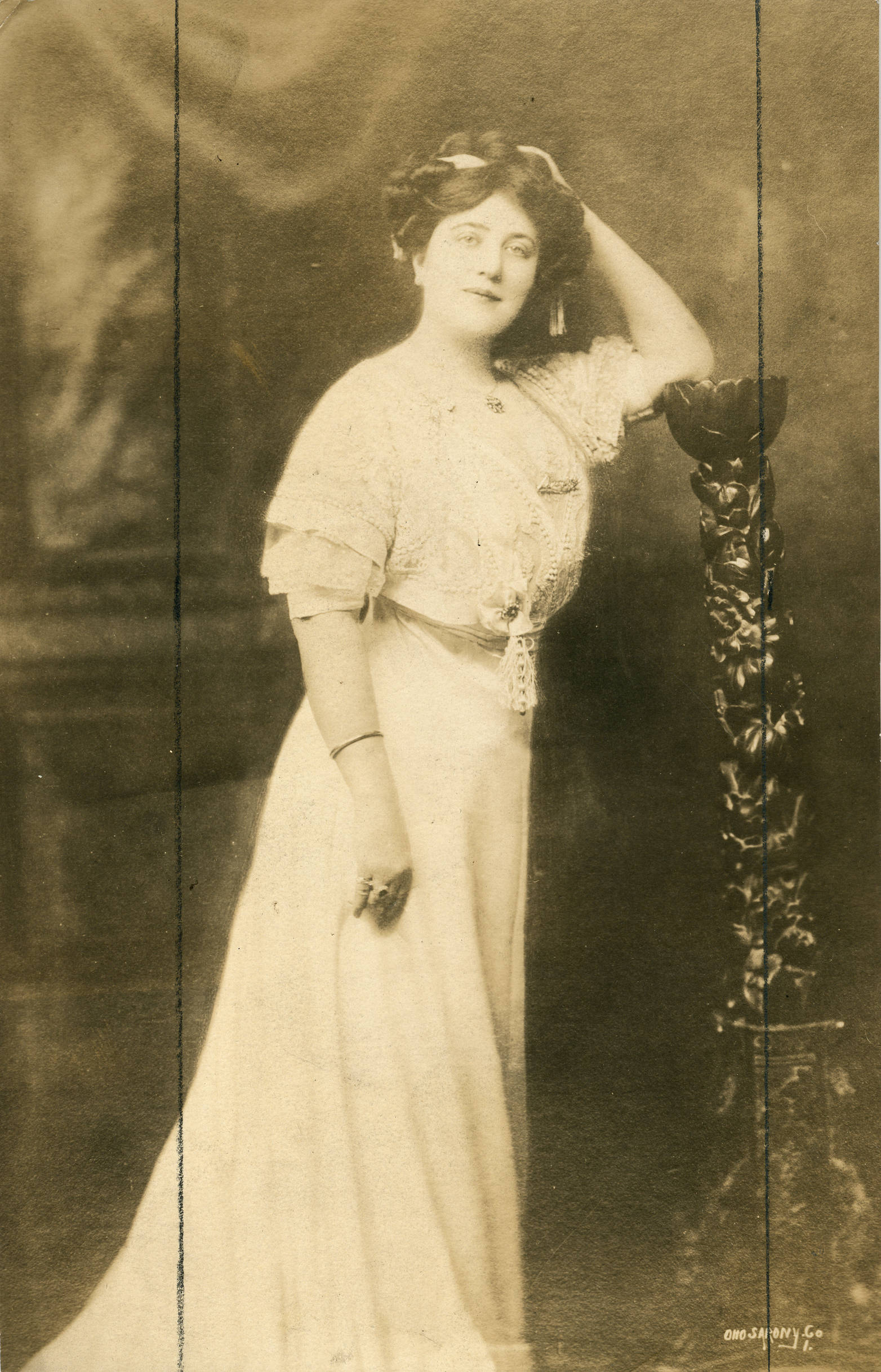
Dorothy Drew

Dorothy Drew was a vaudeville actress who was rumored to have married James J. Jeffries in November 1900. At this time Drew was featured in "The Young Plumber", a comedy at Poli's Vaudeville, in New Haven, Connecticut. Jeffries publicly denied proposing marriage to Drew on December 2, 1900.

A versatile talent, she was billed as a dancer during a performance at the Casino Roof Garden., in July 1896. On Ladies Day at the New Manhattan Athletic Club, Drew danced and sang songs, in January 1895.
