= Dorothy Sims =

Dorothy Sims may refer to:

- Dorothy Clay Sims (born 1957), American lawyer
- Dorothy Rice Sims (1889–1960), American sportswoman, artist and journalist
