= Dorothy Thomas =

Dorothy Thomas may refer to:

- Dorothy Thomas (activist) (born 1960), American human rights activist
- Dorothy Thomas (entrepreneur) (1756–1846), Afro-Caribbean businesswoman
- Dorothy Thomas (politician) (1938–2005), Canadian politician
- Dorothy Louise Thomas (1905–1989), British nurse
- Dorothy Swaine Thomas (1899–1977), American sociologist and economist
- Dorothy Thomas (writer) (1898–1990), American writer
