= Dorothy Howell =

Dorothy Howell may refer to:

- Dorothy Howell (composer) (1898–1982), English composer and pianist
- Dorothy Howell (screenwriter) (1899–1971), American screenwriter
- Dorothy Howell Rodham (1919–2011), American homemaker and mother of Hillary Rodham Clinton
