= Dorothy Vaughan (disambiguation) =

Dorothy Vaughan (1910–2008) was an American mathematician and human computer.

Dorothy Vaughan may also refer to:

- Dorothy Vaughan (actress) (1890–1955), American actress
- Dorothy Vaughan (social reformer) (1881–1974), Australian social reformer
