= Dorothy Eagle =

English editor

Dorothy Eagle, née Glasgow (born 1912) was an English editor at the Clarendon Press, who compiled several literary reference works.

== Life ==
Dorothy Eagle was born on 10 March 1912 in Newcastle upon Tyne. From 1953 until 1978, she was a member of the editorial staff at the Clarendon Press.

Her son John (died 2018) was an artist and photographer, who published photo-essays on Irish lighthouses.

== Works ==
- The Oxford Companion to English Literature
- The Oxford Literary Guide to the British Isles,
- The Concise Oxford Dictionary of English Literature, Oxford University Press, 1977.
- The Oxford Illustrated Dictionary
