= Dorothy Sherrill =

American writer

- Born: May 5, 1901; South Weymouth, Massachusetts
- Died: February 28, 1990 (aged 88); Holland, Pennsylvania
- Other name: April Martin
- Spouse: Arthur Miles Sherrill
- Children: 2
- Parents: Clinton Hallett Googins; Alma Sharp Googins
- Awards: Citation from President Harry S. Truman; Freedoms Foundation medal

Dorothy Sherrill (1901–1990) was an American editor, writer and illustrator specializing in books for children. Born in South Weymouth, Massachusetts, she attended Radcliffe College, graduating with a Bachelor of Arts in 1922.

She began her career in the editorial department of Vogue in 1923. In 1925 she married Arthur Miles Sherrill, a writer and publisher. She edited juvenile books from 1949 through 1951 for the David C. Cook Publishing Co., and from 1958 through 1961, she was an editor for Editor's Notebook in New York City. During these same decades she published eight self-illustrated books for children, and in 1969 she became a published novelist. Sherrill received a citation from President Harry S. Truman in 1949, and she was awarded a medal from Freedoms Foundation in 1950.

Sherrill died in 1990 in Holland, Pennsylvania. Her husband preceded her in death in 1963.

== Bibliography ==
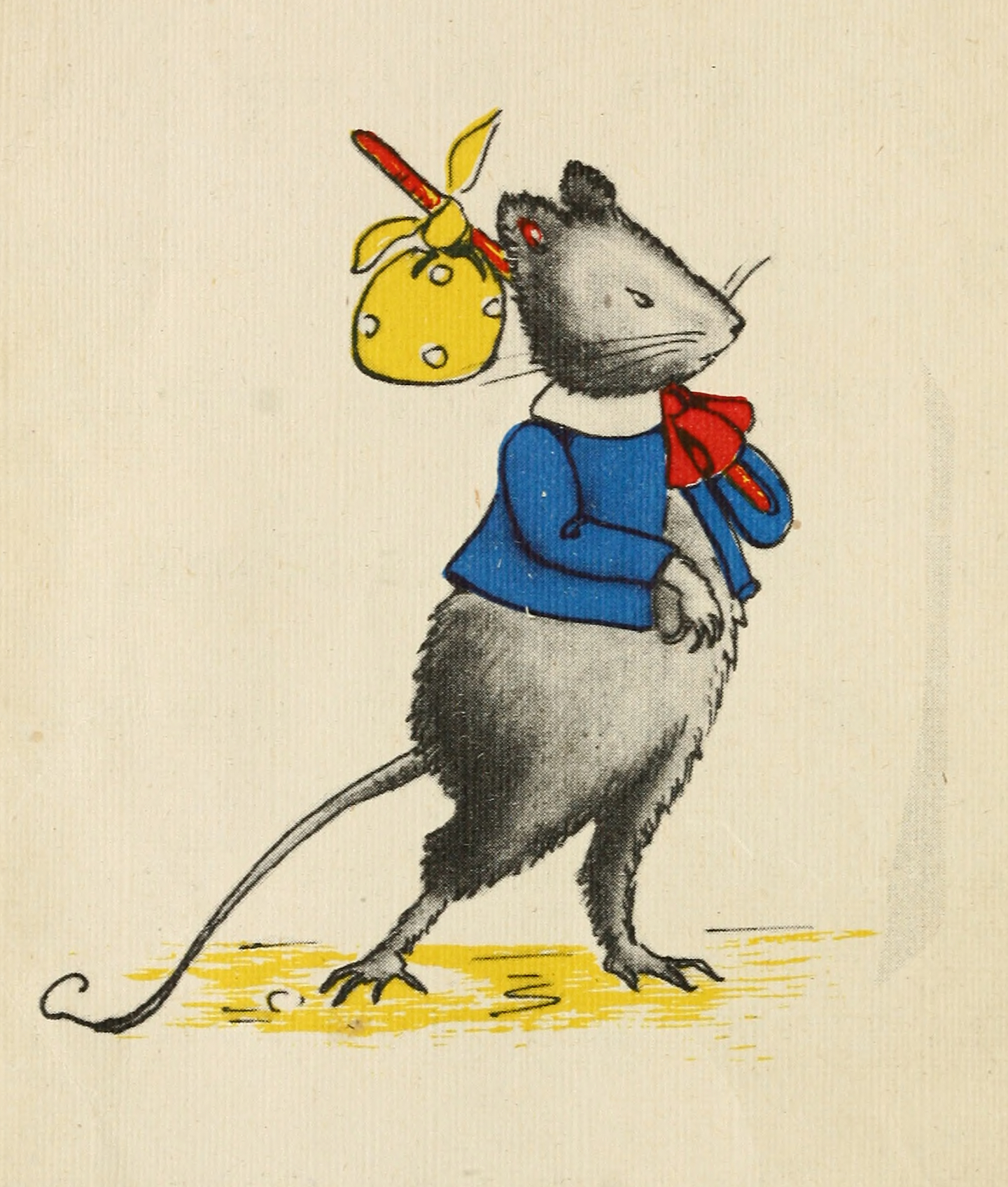
Illustration from Sherrill's The Story of a Little Gray Mouse

=== Children's books, self-illustrated ===
- The Story of a Little White Teddy Bear Who Didn't Want to Go to Bed (1931)
- The Story of a Little Yellow Dog and a Little White Bear (1932)
- The Story of Sleepy Sam (1932)
- The Story of Sleepy Sally (1933)
- The Story of a Little Duck (1935)
- The Story of a Little Gray Mouse (1945)
- The Story of Roly and Poly, the Santa Claus Bears (1952)
- Jackie Rabbit and the Last Carrot (as April Martin, 1935)

=== Novel ===
- Captain from Nantucket (1969)

Sherrill also wrote for Vogue and The Atlantic magazines.
