= Dorothy Heller =

American painter

- Born: 1917; New York, New York
- Died: 2003 (aged 85–86); New York, New York
- Known for: Painting
- Movement: Abstract Expressionism

Dorothy Heller (1917 – 2003) was an American painter.

Born in New York City, Heller was an Abstract Expressionist who studied at the Art Students League of New York and was a pupil of Hans Hoffman. She worked in acrylic, and exhibited widely during her career in solo and group shows throughout the United States. Her work was included in 1956 Annual Exhibition: Sculpture, Paintings, Watercolors, Drawings at the Whitney Museum of American Art. Three of her drawings, two nudes and a figure study, are owned by the Metropolitan Museum of Art, and her work may also be found in the collections of the Wadsworth Athenaeum, the Allen Memorial Art Museum, and the Herbert F. Johnson Museum of Art. A collection of her papers and other miscellany is held by the Archives of American Art of the Smithsonian Institution.
