= Dorothy Baker =

Dorothy Baker may refer to:

- Dorothy Baker (madam) (1915–1973), American madam
- Dorothy Baker (writer) (1907–1968), American novelist
- Dorothy Beecher Baker (1898–1954), American teacher
