= Dorothy Goldin Rosenberg =

Canadian educator and film consultant

Dorothy Goldin Rosenberg is a Canadian educator and film consultant. She researches, writes and speaks on environmental health, equality, social justice, economic justice, environmental justice, peace, and energy issues.

== Biography ==
Dorothy Goldin Rosenberg PhD, MES, holds a master's in environmental studies (York University) and a PhD (University of Toronto). She has worked with the National Film Board of Canada, school boards, non governmental organizations, health professionals and policy groups on these issues. She was principal research consultant and associate producer of the documentary video, Exposure: Environmental Links to Breast Cancer and researcher/writer of the accompanying guidebook "Taking Action for a Healthy Future". She has led training trainers workshops using these materials as educational tools.

She has researched and produced Toxic Trespass, a documentary on children's health and the environment as a co-production with the National Film Board of Canada.and has co-written the accompanying guide, "Taking Action on Children's Health and the Environment".

Dorothy is Volunteer Education Coordinator of the Women's Healthy Environments Network (WHEN). She teaches "Environmental Health, Transformative Higher Education and Policy Change: Education for Social and Ecosystem Healing" at the Ontario Institute for Studies in Education (OISE) at the University of Toronto,

Dorothy was director of a project to produce the publication "Les femmes s'en melent: Making a World of Difference: A Directory of Women in Canada Specializing in Global Issues". The global issues included development, environment, peace and related social justice and economic issues. Dorothy was the Development and Disarmament Coordinator at the Canadian Council for International Cooperation (1986–88).

== Awards ==
- Commemorative Medal for the 125th Anniversary of the Confederation of Canada, a Governor General of Canada Award
- United Nations Environmental Program Award (UNEP) for Environmental Stewardship
- Canadian Auto Workers (CAW) Award for Cancer Prevention
- Biophilia (Love of Life) Award of the Jazzpur Society of Windsor
- 2005 Women of the Year Award, America Library Society
- The Rosalie Bertell Award for Exemplary Public Service 2009
- The International Holistic Tourism Educational Award for the Promotion of the International Peace Garden Program on Peace and Sustainability 2010
- The Tom Perry Award for Peace Education, Physicians for Global Survival 2010

Award to Toxic Trespass:Best Health and Safety Documentary at the Canadian International Labour Film Festival from the Ontario Workers Health and Safety Centre, 2009.

== Selected publications ==
- Indigenous Knowledges in Global Contexts: Multiple Readings of Our World, Edited by George Dei, Budd Hall, and Dorothy Goldin Rosenberg, University of Toronto Press, 2000.

== Documentary Films ==
- Toxic Trespass, National Film Board of Canada, 2007
- Exposure: Environmental Links to Breast Cancer, Women's Healthy Environments Network (WHEN), 1999
