= Dorothy Green =

Dorothy Green may refer to:

- Dorothy Green (actress) (1920–2008), American actress
- Dorothy Green (environmentalist) (1929–2008), conservationist and environmentalist
- Dorothy Green (silent film actress) (1886-1963), American silent film actress
- Dorothy Green (tennis) (1897–1964), American tennis player at the start of the 20th century
- Dolly Green (Dorothy Wellborn Green, 1906–1990), American heiress, philanthropist and thoroughbred owner
- Dorothy Auchterlonie Green (1915–1991), Australian author and critic
- Dottie Green (1921–1992), professional baseball player

== See also ==
- Dorothy Greener (1917–1971) English-born American actress and comedian
