= Dorothy Campbell (disambiguation) =

Dorothy Campbell (1883–1945) was a Scottish golfer.

Dorothy Campbell may also refer to:

- Dorothy Stokes Bostwick or Dorothy Stokes Bostwick Smith Campbell (1899–2001), American heiress, artist and author
- Dorothy Marion Campbell (1911–2005), English potter
