= Dorothy Edwards =

Dorothy Edwards may refer to:

- Dorothy Edwards (Welsh novelist) (1902–1934)
- Dorothy Edwards (mayor) (1906–2005), Australian mayor
- Dorothy Edwards (children's writer) (1914–1982), English children's writer
- Dorothy Edwards (actress) (1917–1979), Welsh actress
- Dorothy Edwards Brunson (1939–2011), African-American broadcaster
