= Dorothy Miner =

Dorothy Miner may refer to:

- Dorothy Miner (attorney) (1936–2008), American lawyer
- Dorothy Miner (historian) (1904–1973), American art historian
