= Dorothy Walworth Carman =

American novelist, writer and lecturer

Dorothy Walworth Merle was an American novelist, writer, and lecturer. She published her work under her married name, Dorothy Walworth Carman, and later under her maiden name, Dorothy Walworth. She wrote novels and short stories, and much of her early work focused on community life in the suburbs. In the last years of her life, she wrote non-fiction articles for various publications, and was a staff writer at the Reader's Digest.

== Biography ==
Dorothy Walworth was born on March 15, 1900, in Cornwall, New York, to parents Janet (née Campbell) and Charles Lorenzo Walworth. Both her father and grandfather were Methodist clergymen. She grew up in Maplewood, New Jersey, where her father worked as a Methodist Episcopal minister.

Walworth graduated from Vassar College in 1920 with a Bachelor of Arts. While at Vassar, she was a member of Phi Beta Kappa. On November 25, 1920, she married Allan Carman. They had a daughter together named Dorothy, and she started working on her first book while caring for their child.

Her first novel, Faith of Our Fathers, was published in 1925. The story focused on the politics behind the Methodist Episcopal church. Her second novel was published a year later, titled The Pride of the Town, and it satirized young, suburban married couples. She also wrote the books Chickens Come Home to Roost, published in 1927, and The Glory and the Parlour, published in 1929.

Around March 1930, she moved to Reno, Nevada, while she tried to decide if she should get divorced from her husband. On June 21, she officially filed for divorce from Allan Carman, and the divorce was finalized later that year. She remarried on January 1, 1931, to Merle Crowell, a writer and retired editor.

In August 1935, her book A Rainbow at Noon was published. The novel focused on divorce and second marriage. In an interview, Walworth commented that the idea for the story and some of the details were based on her own experiences—such as how the married couple in the novel made an agreement to never say the names of their former spouses—but that many of the incidents in the book were fictional.

From 1937 to 1938, Walworth was the dean of curriculum in the English Literature department at Briarcliff Junior College in New York. In 1941, she wrote the novel, Feast of Reason, which was set in a modern school for girls. Starting with this book, she began to publish under her maiden name; previously, she had used the name "Dorothy Walworth Carman" for her writing. In July 1942, Feast of Reason was bought by Metro-Goldwyn-Mayer, with the plan that it would be produced as a film.

In 1946, Walworth's novel Nicodemus was published. The story included Biblical themes and was set in Broadway's theater industry. Later that year, Hodder and Stoughton bought the book's British publishing rights. Around 1947, it placed on Houghton-Mifflin's list of best-sellers.

As a writer, Walworth also contributed to various periodicals, including Woman's Home Companion, The American Magazine, Harper's Magazine and Red Book. In the last years of her life, she was a staff writer at The Reader's Digest.

Around 1950, Walworth was in the process of writing a book set in Alaska, titled The Love of Eva McGown. Research and excerpts from the book were released in the Reader's Digest, but Walworth passed away before the book was published.

Walworth died in Kansas on November 5, 1953, at age 53, due to a cerebral hemorrhage. At the time of her death, she was on a train traveling from California to her home in Chappaqua, New York.

== Selected works ==
=== Novels ===
- Faith of Our Fathers (1925)
- The Pride of the Town (1926)
- Chickens Come Home to Roost (1927)
- The Glory and the Parlour (1929)
- They Thought They Could Buy It (1930)
- Reno Fever (1931)
- A Rainbow at Noon (1935)
- Feast of Reason (1941)
- Nicodemus (1946)

=== Short stories ===
- "Every Thursday" (January 1927) - published in Harper's Magazine
- "One Golden Apple" (August 1928) - published in Woman's Home Companion
- "Boys Will Be Boys" (August 1929) - published in Woman's Home Companion
- "Four Is Too Many" (September 1929) - published in Woman's Home Companion
- "Abigail Wants a Ring" (December 1929) - published in American Magazine
- "The Dog Who Had Everything" (December 1949) - published in Ladies' Home Journal

=== Articles ===
- "Look Homeward Too, Democracy!" (c. 1942) - published in Progressive and reprinted in Reader's Digest (July 1942)
- "The Spiritualist Boom" (April 1943) - published in American Mercury
- "Are You Afraid Of Your In-Laws?" (January 1944) - published in Good Housekeeping
- "Should We Subsidize Our Married Children?" (May 1944) - published in Good Housekeeping
- "When You Come to the End of a Perfect Day" (December 1945) - published in Reader's Digest
