= Dorothy Lee Bolden =

American trade unionist (1924-2005)

- Born: October 13, 1924; Atlanta, Georgia, U.S.
- Died: July 14, 2005 (aged 80); Atlanta, Georgia, U.S.
- Occupations: Domestic worker, trade unionist
- Organization: National Domestic Worker's Union of America
- Movement: Civil Rights Movement

Dorothy Lee Bolden (October 13, 1924 – July 14, 2005) was the founder of the National Domestic Worker's Union of America and worked to fight for women's rights, a living wage, and bringing segregation to an end. Bolden began working as a domestic worker at the age of nine. She would eventually utilize her past experiences to form the Domestic Worker's Union in Atlanta, Georgia.

== Early life ==
Bolden was born on October 13, 1924, in Atlanta, Georgia. Bolden was the daughter of Georgia Mae Patterson Bolden and Raymond Bolden. Both of her parents provided for their family, her mother was a housekeeper and her father was a chauffeur. Early education was difficult for Bolden due to poor eyesight. After a fall that damaged her optic nerve at the age of three, she didn’t gain her vision until the age of nine. She started working at the age of nine as a domestic worker and would continue in this work for forty-nine years. Bolden went to E. P. Johnson Elementary School and then David T. Howard High School. However, she only attended ninth grade and then had to stop because she needed to financially support herself. As a young woman, she traveled to Chicago to go to a school for dress designers, but her poor eyesight hindered her education. During World War II, Bolden also worked at Sears and the National Linen Service, where she recognized the early efforts for unionization and labor rights. Martin Luther King Jr. was an early influence in Bolden’s life, who was her neighbor at the time of the Civil Rights Movement.

== Career ==
Bolden was a life-long domestic worker and extremely proud of her profession. She often spoke highly of this labor and was quoted in a supplement to The Atlanta Journal and The Atlanta Constitution in 1983 as saying "A domestic worker is a counselor, a doctor, a nurse. She cares about the family she works for as she cares about her own." But domestic workers "have never been recognized as part of the labor force."

Bolden became an activist well before the re-emergence of the civil rights movement in the 1960s. In the late 1940s, Bolden refused a request from her boss, a white woman, to stay late and wash the dishes. Her boss alerted local police, who responded by taking her to a county jail for a psychiatric evaluation. In an oral history interview from 1995, Bolden recalled the severity of the incident. "They told me I was crazy because I had talked back to a white woman, and called in some psychiatrists to prove it," said Bolden. "A white woman’s word was gospel, and two psychiatrists actually thought I was crazy… This was the way you got locked up…This was the system."

With the help of Dr. Martin Luther King Jr., Bolden was able to build relationships with families all over Atlanta. Women were able to open up to Bolden about their experiences as domestic workers. Life for domestic workers was very challenging. During the 1960s, domestic workers endured 13 hour workdays and received as little as $3.50. However, in 1968, Bolden started discussions with other unions about beginning to organize a national union for domestic workers. The union helped improve the wages and working conditions of domestic workers in Atlanta and served as an example for other domestic workers all across the country. Bolden eventually gathered 13,000 women from ten different cities, benefiting from job referrals and organizations. The union helped to increase wages and working conditions for domestic workers. Also members were taught how to work out problems with their employers. Bolden became an icon in Atlanta due to all the help that she gave to domestic workers. The records of this union are kept at the organization's office and in the Southern Labor Archives at Georgia State University. Under her leadership, the National Domestic Worker's Union fundamentally influenced the treatment of domestic workers. Bolden was central to actions that increased Atlanta wages by 33% over two years and won workers' compensation and Social Security rights for all domestic workers.

Bolden was also responsible for registering thousands of African Americans to vote. Her work improved the living conditions of many residents throughout Atlanta. Bolden's efforts gained the attention of the Nixon Administration and she was appointed to an advisory committee on social services and welfare.

== Personal life ==
Bolden married her first husband in 1941 but that ended in divorce. Later on, she married Abram Thompson and they had six children together- Frank, Avon Butts, Dorthy Ingram, Altermiece Gates, Abram and Anthony. To support her family, Bolden had to work in many different jobs including the Greyhound bus station, Linen Supply Company, Sears Roebuck, and Railroad Express. Although Bolden was a domestic worker, she did not accept jobs that did not involve child care. She loved working with children and seeing them develop into young adults. Bolden died in Atlanta on July 14, 2005.
