= Dorothy Kuhn Oko =

American librarian

- Oko in 1918
- Born: July 22, 1896; Cincinnati, Ohio, US
- Died: July 17, 1971 (aged 74); New York City, New York, US
- Education: Radcliffe College, Columbia University, New School for Social Research

Dorothy Kuhn Oko (July 22, 1896 – July 17, 1971) was an American librarian who was a pioneer in establishing library services for the labor union movement.

== Early life and education ==
Dorothy Kuhn was born in Cincinnati, Ohio, on July 22, 1896. She graduated from Radcliffe College in 1918, received a Bachelor of Science from Columbia University in 1947, and earned a master's degree in sociology from the New School for Social Research in 1955.

She married Leonard Minster in 1918. Divorcing him, she then married Adolph S. Oko in 1933.

== Work in libraries ==
In the 1940s United States labor union members and officials required well-researched information from the perspective of labor and relied on public libraries to provide resources and advice in selecting program labor training materials. Dorothy Kuhn Oko began the labor education service of the New York Public Library in 1947, providing leadership in the adaptation to the changing needs of union members and leaders. Oko directed the NYPL labor education service until 1961.

She was a member of the Committee for the Preservation of Labor Reports and, after the AFL–CIO and the American Library Association formed the Joint Committee on Library Service to Labor Groups in 1945, Oko was for many years the "guiding force" of that group.

In 1963 Oko co-edited a volume of works reflecting on the relationship between libraries and labor, Library Service to Labor. The book included historical background, theory, and case studies of libraries reaching out to and serving labor organizations.

Oko died July 17, 1971, in New York City.
