= Dorothy Alexander =

Dorothy Alexander may refer to:

- Dottie Alexander (born 1972), keyboardist
- Dorothy Bohm (1924–2023), photographer who used the name Dorothy Alexander
- Dorothy Alexander (dancer) (1904–1986), founder of the precursor of Atlanta Ballet
