= Dorothy Steel =

Dorothy Steel may refer to:

- Dorothy Steel (actress) (1926–2021), American actress
- Dorothy Steel (croquet player) (1884–1965), English croquet player, commonly referred to as D. D. Steel
