= Dorothy Knapp (artist) =

American cover maker

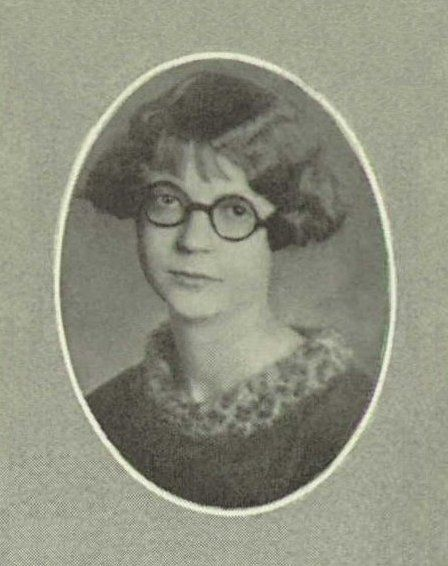
- Born: June 1, 1907
- Died: August 28, 1986 (aged 79)
- Resting place: Rhinebeck, New York, US
- Known for: First day covers
- Spouse: Maxwell Knapp

Dorothy Knapp (1907–1986) was an American cover artist who designed commercial first day covers.

== Biography ==
Knapp was an envelope artist and art teacher in Rhinebeck, New York. She designed commercial first day covers (FDC) mainly for Fleetwood, one of the largest FDC publishers.

Her career started in the late 1930s at the time hand-painted cachets, which were more expensive than the printed cachets, were not widely wanted. However, Knapp “influenced others to start hand-painting covers, [...] she influenced the style of mid-20th century cachets,” said Douglas Weisz, Knapp's biographer. In addition to mass-produced designs, she often created small quantities — ten or twelve per stamp issue — of hand-drawn, hand-painted covers.

Knapp was never a stamp collector belonging to any philatelic organization nor did she subscribe to any philatelic publications. However, her husband was a stamp collector and cover approval dealer. Cachetmaking "was a way for them to share something together," said Weisz. "And when her husband died, she stopped... It wasn't something they could do together anymore. It wasn't interesting to her. She did it because of family and love."

== Works and legacy ==
Knapp is considered to be one of the most famous cachet artists in the history of philately; "her work has majorly influenced generations of artists who present their designs on envelopes," said Weisz.

By late 1970s, Knapp's FDCs were selling for a few hundred dollars each. In FDC collecting today, her FDCs typically sell for $200–500 each.
