= Dorothy Walker =

Dorothy Walker may refer to:

- Dorothy Walker (critic) (1929–2002), Irish art collector and critic
- Dorothy Walker (journalist and writer), British journalist and author
- Dorothy Walker (lawyer) (1899–1983), American lawyer
- Dorothy Walker Bush (1901–1992), wife of Prescott Bush
