= Dorothy Bush =

Dorothy Bush may refer to:

- Dorothy Bush Koch (born 1959), American author and philanthropist
- Dorothy Vredenburgh Bush (1916–1991), American political activist
- Dorothy Wear Walker Bush 1901–1992), mother of President George H. W. Bush.
