= Dorothy Hyuha =

Ugandan politician

Dorothy Samali Hyuha
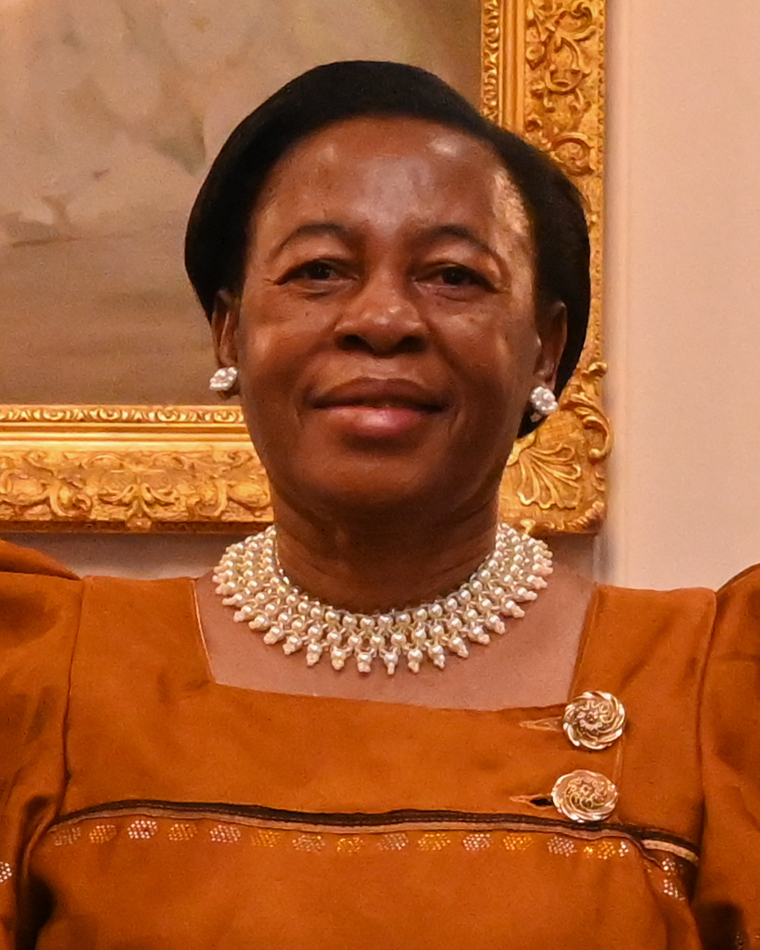
- Hyuha in 2023
- Born: 4 July 1962 (age 63); Uganda
- Citizenship: Uganda
- Education: Makerere University (Bachelor of Science with Diploma in Education) (Master of Education)
- Occupations: Educator, politician, and diplomat
- Years active: since 1986
- Title: High Commissioner of the Republic of Uganda to Malaysia (08/2017 - Present)
- Spouse: Daniel Haumba Hyuha

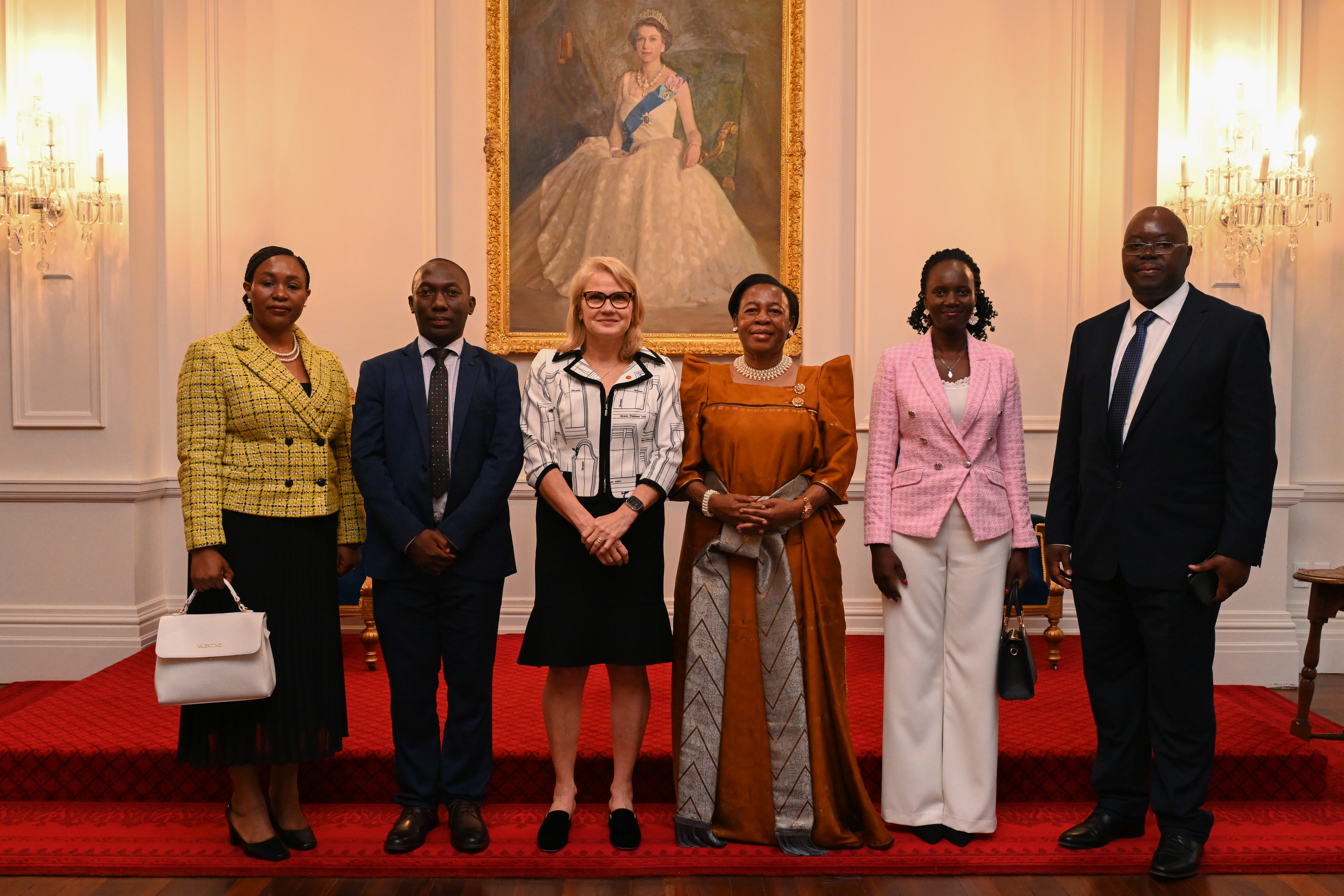
Dorothy Hyuha presents credentials to Helen Winkelmann.

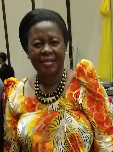
Dorothy Hyuha

Dorothy Samali Hyuha is a Ugandan diplomat, educator, and politician. She is the High Commissioner (Ambassador) of Uganda to Malaysia. She previously served as Minister Without Portfolio in the Cabinet of Uganda. From 2006 until 2011, Hyuha served as the Butaleja District Woman MP in the Ugandan Parliament. During the same time-frame, she concurrently served as the deputy secretary general of the National Resistance Movement (NRM) political party.

== Career ==
Hyuha was first elected to the Uganda Parliament in 1996 as a representative of Tororo District, a post she held until 2006. After Butaleja District was carved out of Tororo District in 2006, she won the parliamentary seat of women's representative for Butalehja District on the NRM party ticket. She held that position until she lost the seat in 2011 to Cerinah Nebanda. From 2009 until 2011 she served as Minister Without Portfolio. In August 2012, Hyuha was appointed Uganda's High Commissioner to Tanzania, where she served until August 2017 and transferred to Malaysia under the same role. She is currently serving at the High Commission of the Republic of Uganda to Malaysia.

== Personal details ==
She is a member of the ruling NRM political party. She was married to Daniel Hyuha, who died in December 2014 at age 68. They owned three homes in the Butalja District.

== See also ==
- Butaleja District
- National Resistance Movement
- Cabinet of Uganda
