= Dorothy Lewis =

Dorothy Lewis may refer to:

- Dorothy Otnow Lewis, American psychiatrist
- Dorothy Swain Lewis (1915–2013), American aviator
- Dorothy Lewis (bowls), English lawn bowler

== See also ==
- Dorothy Lewis Bernstein (1914–1988), American mathematician
