= Dorothy Sarbitt =

British artist

Dorothy Sarbitt (sometimes Sarbit) was an English silversmith floruit 1750s, and based at least partly in London; she also produced work under the name Dorothy Mills. She was classified as a largeworker when2 she applied for her own mark after the death of her husband in 1752. She later registered a mark under Dorothy Sarbitt. Her mark is not known after 1754. Her work is in the collections of National Museum of Women in the Arts, Minneapolis Institute of Arts and the Hillwood Estate, Museum & Gardens in Washington.

== Life ==
Sarbitt was first married to largeworker Hugh Mills, and after his death registered a mark, as Dorothy Mills, on 6 April 1752, at which time she was classified as a largeworker and as a widow. Evidence exists that she had by this time entered into a partnership with goldsmith Thomas Sarbitt; a mark from 1746-47 attests to this, as does another registered in 1748-49. She registered a second mark of her own as Dorothy Sarbitt on 13 December 1753. An address of Saffron Hill is listed for at least part of her career. It appears that Thomas Sarbitt had retired or died by 1752; the following year Dorothy married John Sarbitt, whose relation to the other is unknown. No record of her hallmark is known past 1754, indicating that she may have closed the business down in that year.

== Work ==
A George II sauce boat hallmarked "Dorothy Mills", produced in conjunction with Thomas Sarbitt and dating to 1748, is owned by the National Museum of Women in the Arts. The same institution owns several pieces hallmarked "Dorothy Sarbitt", including a pair of George II salvers from 1753 and another George II salver from 1754. A George II salver from 1754 was sold by Bonhams in 2025, from the collection of the Earl and Countess of Perth. The Minneapolis Institute of Arts is possessed of a cream jug attributed to Mills and Sarbitt and dated 1749/50. A tray possibly made by Dorothy Sarbitt in conjunction with Daniel Shaw, dated 1754, is in the collection of Hillwood Estate, Museum & Gardens.
