= Dorothy Hughes =

Dorothy Hughes may refer to:

- Dorothy Hughes (architect) (1910–1987), Kenyan architect, politician, social reformer and disability activist
- Dorothy B. Hughes (1904–1993), American crime writer and literary critic
- Dorothy Pitman Hughes (1938–2022), feminist, child-welfare advocate and African-American activist
