= Dorothy Richards (writer) =

Australian writer

Dorothy Richards (1916–2016) was an Australian writer.

== Biography ==
Richards spent most of her life in Williamstown. She completed her primary education from Strathmore Grammar School, which later became Westbourne Grammar School. Later, she attended Methodist Ladies' College, Melbourne. She was married to Harold Richards.

Her interest in writing developed when she joined Friday Writers. During her writing career, she wrote for the Australian Women's Weekly and the Weekly Times. Based on her writing, a movie named My Father Is a Wonderful Man was released.

== Books ==
- An Anthology of Aunts: Growing Up in Williamstown (1998)
- Free Range (2007)
