= Dorothy Healy =

Dorothy Healy may refer to:

- Dorothy M. Healy (1914–1990), professor at Westbrook College and curator of the Maine Women Writers Collection
- Dorothy Ray Healey (1914–2006), Communist Party USA activist
