= Dorothy Morland =

British arts administrator

Dorothy Morland (1906-1999) was the director of the Institute of Contemporary Arts (ICA) from 1952 to 1968, its first female director. Her biographer Anna Massey contends that Morland was "the protector and advocate of the Independent Group (art movement), which met at the ICA from 1952-5", and that if the Independent Group are considered the "Fathers of Pop" then she could be considered the "Mother of Pop"; her obituary in the Guardian referred to her as "'guardian angel' to the pop art movement". During her tenure she also gave early shows to Max Ernst, Jackson Pollock and Henri Cartier-Bresson.

Born in Hanwell, Middlesex, Morland studied at the Royal College of Music. Soon after, she contracted tuberculosis; she went to Switzerland to recover, where she met the doctor Andrew Morland, whom she married in 1928. After the Second World War, she met Peter Gregory, and became involved with the ICA, which Gregory had founded. In 1951 she began to assist with the organisation's administration.

After leaving the ICA she worked on assembling and securing the organisation’s archives, now stored in the archive of Tate Britain as the "Dorothy Morland Collection".
