= Dorothy Lee =

Dorothy Lee may refer to:

- Dorothy Lee (actress) (1911–1999), 1930s actress/comedian
- Dorothy Lee (theologian) (born 1953), Australian New Testament scholar
- Dorothy D. Lee (1905–1975), author and philosopher of cultural anthropology
- Dorothy McCullough Lee (1901–1981), first female mayor of Portland, Oregon
- pseudonym for composer John Stepan Zamecnik
