= Dorothy Hardisty =

English civil servant and humanitarian

Dorothy Hepburn Hardisty MBE, née Jones (1881-1973) was an English civil servant and humanitarian. As General Secretary of the Refugee Children's Movement (RCM) from 1940 until 1948, she worked for the welfare of the Jewish child refugees who had arrived in the Kindertransport.

== Life ==
Dorothy Hardisty was born on 4 July 1881, the daughter of Francis Jones, who taught at Manchester Grammar School, and Jessie, née Ferguson. She gained a degree at Manchester University before becoming a civil servant, eventually becoming a senior civil servant in the Ministry of Labour. In 1940 she was appointed General Secretary of the Refugee Children's Movement, responsible for ensuring that the ten thousand refugee children had homes, education, training and jobs. While she set up Regional Committees to decentralize the work, she herself kept files on every child and took personal interest in their welfare. She was awarded the MBE in 1946.

Leaving the RCM in 1948, she ran the Violet Melchett Infant Welfare Clinic in Chelsea for almost twenty years, retiring aged 86.
