= Dorothy Stone =

Dorothy Stone may refer to:

- Dorothy Stone (actress) (1905–1974), American actress
- Dorothy Maharam Stone (1917–2014), American mathematician
