= Dorothy McMillan =

British literary scholar (1943–2021)

Dorothy A. McMillan (1943 – 2021) was a British literary scholar. An expert on Scottish women's writing, McMillan edited several anthologies, as well as editions of work by George Douglas Brown, Jane Austen, Mary Somerville, Robert Browning and Susan Ferrier. She taught for nearly 40 years at Glasgow University, where she became Senior Lecturer and later Honorary Research Fellow in English Literature.

== Life ==
Dorothy McMillan was born Dorothy Porter on 17 April 1943. Correction- McMillan was her maiden name. Porter was her first married name.

From 1998 to 2002 McMillan served as president of the Association for Scottish Literary Studies (ASLS). At Glasgow she became head of the university's School of English and Scottish Language and Literature. She retired from Glasgow University in 2008.

== Works ==
- (ed.) The house with green shutters by George Douglas Brown. Harmondsworth: Penguin, 1985.
- (ed. with Douglas Gifford) A History of Scottish Women's Writing. Edinburgh: Edinburgh University Press, 1997.
- (ed.) The Scotswoman at home and abroad: non-fictional writing 1700-1900. Glasgow: Association for Scottish Literary Studies, 1999.
- (ed.) Queen of science: personal recollections of Mary Somerville by Mary Somerville. Edinburgh: Canongate, 2001.
- (ed. with Michael Byrne) Modern Scottish Women Poets. Edinburgh: Canongate, 2003.
- (ed. with Richard Cronin) Emma by Jane Austen. Cambridge: Cambridge University Press, 2005. The Cambridge edition of the works of Jane Austen.
- (ed. with Richard Cronin) Robert Browning. Oxford: Oxford University Press, 2015. 21st-Century Oxford Authors.
- (ed.) Marriage: a novel by Susan Ferrier. Glasgow: The Association for Scottish Literary Studies, 2020.
