= Dorothy Vicary =

English novelist

Sybil Dorothy Vicary (née Mudge) was an English novelist. She was best known for her school adventure story novels aimed at 14- to 15-year-old girls, including Lucy Brown's School Days and Niece of the Headmistress. Vicary lived in Belfast in the 1930s and moved to Golders Green in London in the 1950s, where she wrote A Secret at Sprayle in 1955 under the name Dorothy Mary Rice.
