= 2021–22 Melbourne Renegades WBBL season =

Australian cricket team season

Melbourne Renegades
2021–22 season
- Melbourne Renegades 2021–22 cap logo
- Coach: Simon Helmot
- Captain(s): Sophie Molineux
- Home ground: N/A
- League: WBBL
- Record: 8–4 (2nd)
- Finals: Lost the Challenger
- Leading Run Scorer: Harmanpreet Kaur – 406
- Leading Wicket Taker: Harmanpreet Kaur – 15
- Player of the Season: Harmanpreet Kaur

The 2021–22 Melbourne Renegades Women's season was the seventh in the team's history. Coached by Simon Helmot and captained by Sophie Molineux, the Renegades were not scheduled to play any WBBL|07 games in their home state of Victoria due to ongoing border restrictions related to the COVID-19 pandemic. They nevertheless finished the regular season in second position—their best performance across the WBBL's first seven editions—catapulted by a standout campaign from Indian marquee Harmanpreet Kaur, who was named Player of the Tournament.

In the Challenger, played at Adelaide Oval on 25 November 2021 for a spot in the championship final, the Renegades suffered a nine-wicket defeat against the Adelaide Strikers and were eliminated from the tournament.

== Squad ==
Each 2021–22 squad is made up of 15 active players. Teams could sign up to five 'marquee players', with a maximum of three of those from overseas. Marquees are classed as any overseas player, or a local player who holds a Cricket Australia national contract at the start of the WBBL|07 signing period.

Personnel changes made ahead of the season included:

- New Zealand marquees Amy Satterthwaite and Lea Tahuhu did not re-sign with the Renegades, opting to sit out the tournament.
- South African marquee Lizelle Lee departed the Renegades, initially signing with the Hobart Hurricanes.
- English marquee Evelyn Jones and Indian marquee Jemimah Rodrigues signed with the Renegades, marking their first appearances in the league.
- Indian marquee Harmanpreet Kaur returned to the league and signed with the Renegades, having previously played for the Sydney Thunder.
- Molly Strano departed the Renegades, signing with the Hobart Hurricanes.
- Holly Ferling signed with the Renegades, departing the Melbourne Stars.
- Maitlan Brown departed the Renegades, signing with the Sydney Sixers.
- Ellie Falconer signed with the Renegades, departing the Adelaide Strikers.
- Rhiann O'Donnell returned to the Renegades, having been a member of the team in WBBL|03 before playing for the Hobart Hurricanes in WBBL|04.
- Sophie Molineux was appointed captain, replacing Amy Satterthwaite (17–23 win–loss record).
- Simon Helmot was appointed head coach, replacing Lachlan Stevens.

Squad details during the season included:

- Georgia Wareham sustained a left knee injury while fielding in a match on 20 October, ruling her out for the remainder of the season.

The table below lists the Renegades players and their key stats (including runs scored, batting strike rate, wickets taken, economy rate, catches and stumpings) for the season.

No.	Name	Nat.	Date of birth	Batting style	Bowling style	G	R	SR	W	E	C	S	Notes
Batters
27	Jess Duffin	(Australia)	27 June 1989	Right-handed	Right-arm leg spin	13	160	99.37	–	–	6	–	
8	Evelyn Jones	(England)	8 August 1992	Left-handed	Left-arm medium	12	236	99.57	0	12.00	0	–	Overseas marquee
50	Jemimah Rodrigues	(India)	5 September 2000	Right-handed	Right-arm off spin	13	333	116.43	0	12.00	3	–	Overseas marquee
All-rounders
25	Makinley Blows	(Australia)	12 December 1997	Left-handed	Right-arm medium	1	–	–	–	–	0	–	
7	Harmanpreet Kaur	(India)	8 March 1989	Right-handed	Right-arm off spin	13	406	130.96	15	7.45	8	–	Overseas marquee
11	Courtney Webb	(Australia)	30 November 1999	Right-handed	Right-arm medium	10	144	100.00	9	7.54	1	–	
Wicket-keeper
3	Josie Dooley	(Australia)	21 January 2000	Right-handed	–	13	110	108.91	–	–	7	4	
Bowlers
5	Ellie Falconer	(Australia)	3 August 1999	Right-handed	Right-arm medium fast	12	34	147.82	10	8.88	2	–	
9	Holly Ferling	(Australia)	22 December 1995	Right-handed	Right-arm medium	12	13	118.18	0	10.46	5	–	
24	Poppy Gardner	(Australia)	5 January 2005	Right-handed	Left-arm medium	–	–	–	–	–	–	–	
12	Ella Hayward	(Australia)	8 September 2003	Right-handed	Right-arm off spin	11	26	78.78	5	6.68	5	–	
74	Carly Leeson	(Australia)	9 November 1998	Right-handed	Right-arm medium	11	57	111.76	4	8.21	1	–	
23	Sophie Molineux	(Australia)	17 January 1998	Left-handed	Left-arm orthodox	13	77	106.94	10	5.85	4	–	Captain, Australian marquee
26	Rhiann O'Donnell	(Australia)	14 April 1998	Right-handed	Right-arm medium fast	7	30	73.17	6	7.20	0	–	
32	Georgia Wareham	(Australia)	26 May 1999	Right-handed	Right-arm leg spin	2	18	105.88	3	3.71	2	–	Australian marquee

== Ladder ==
Pos	Team	Pld	W	L	NR	Pts	NRR
1	Perth Scorchers (C)	14	9	3	2	20	0.649
2	Melbourne Renegades (CF)	14	8	4	2	18	−0.149
3	Brisbane Heat (EF)	14	8	5	1	17	0.517
4	Adelaide Strikers (RU)	14	7	6	1	15	0.707
5	Melbourne Stars	14	5	7	2	12	−0.385
6	Hobart Hurricanes	14	5	8	1	11	−0.258
7	Sydney Thunder	14	4	8	2	10	−0.301
8	Sydney Sixers	14	4	9	1	9	−0.704

Source: cricket.com.au, ESPN Cricinfo
- The top 4 teams advanced to the play-off phase

== Fixtures ==
All times are local

=== Regular season ===
Match 2
16 October 2021
15:40
Scorecard

Hobart Hurricanes; 121 (20 overs)	v	Melbourne Renegades; 125/4 (19.2 overs)
Naomi Stalenberg 28 (27); Georgia Wareham 3/13 (4 overs)		Jemimah Rodrigues 33 (34); Belinda Vakarewa 2/21 (4 overs)

Melbourne Renegades won by 6 wickets (with 4 balls remaining)
Blundstone Arena, Hobart
Umpires: Andrew Crozier and Claire Polosak
Player of the match: Georgia Wareham (Melbourne Renegades)

- Hobart Hurricanes won the toss and elected to bat.
- Broadcast by Seven Network and Foxtel

Match 8
20 October 2021
13:25
Scorecard

Melbourne Renegades; 6/126 (20 overs)	v	Adelaide Strikers; 2/129 (17.3 overs)
Harmanpreet Kaur 41 (37); Sarah Coyte 3/20 (4 overs)		Tahlia McGrath 50* (39); Ellie Falconer 1/14 (1 over)

Adelaide Strikers won by 8 wickets (with 15 balls remaining)
Blundstone Arena, Hobart
Umpires: Muhammad Qureshi and David Taylor
Player of the match: Tahlia McGrath (Adelaide Strikers)

- Melbourne Renegades won the toss and elected to bat.
- Broadcast by Cricket Network and Foxtel

Match 13
23 October 2021
19:05 (N)
Scorecard

Perth Scorchers	v	Melbourne Renegades

Match abandoned
University of Tasmania Stadium, Launceston
Umpires: Simon Lightbody and Jeremiah Matibiri

- No toss
- No play was possible due to rain.
- Broadcast by Seven Network and Foxtel

Match 15
24 October 2021
13:40
Scorecard

Sydney Sixers; 4/118 (20 overs)	v	Melbourne Renegades; 3/120 (17 overs)
Ellyse Perry 50* (51); Harmanpreet Kaur 2/17 (4 overs)		Evelyn Jones 38 (30); Radha Yadav 1/12 (2 overs)

Melbourne Renegades won by 7 wickets (with 18 balls remaining)
University of Tasmania Stadium, Launceston
Umpires: Shawn Craig and Mattis van Eck
Player of the match: Harmanpreet Kaur (Melbourne Renegades)

- Melbourne Renegades won the toss and elected to field.
- Broadcast by Seven Network and Foxtel

Match 19
27 October 2021
13:25
Scorecard

Melbourne Renegades; 5/142 (20 overs)	v	Sydney Thunder; 8/133 (20 overs)
Jemimah Rodrigues 75* (56); Kate Peterson 1/10 (2 overs)		Smriti Mandhana 64 (44); Courtney Webb 3/21 (3 overs)

Melbourne Renegades won by 9 runs
University of Tasmania Stadium, Launceston
Umpires: Andrew Crozier and Roberto Howard
Player of the match: Jemimah Rodrigues (Melbourne Renegades)

- Melbourne Renegades won the toss and elected to bat.
- Broadcast by Cricket Network and Foxtel

Match 21
30 October 2021
10:25
Scorecard

Melbourne Renegades; 7/142 (20 overs)	v	Sydney Sixers; 9/130 (20 overs)
Harmanpreet Kaur 43 (32); Ashleigh Gardner 2/8 (2 overs)		Maitlan Brown 31 (20); Ellie Falconer 2/28 (4 overs)

Melbourne Renegades won by 12 runs
Lilac Hill Park, Perth
Umpires: Trent Steenholdt and Jamie Thomas
Player of the match: Jess Duffin (Melbourne Renegades)

- Sydney Sixers won the toss and elected to field.
- Broadcast by Cricket Network and Foxtel

Match 26
31 October 2021
10:25
Scorecard

Adelaide Strikers; 5/160 (20 overs)	v	Melbourne Renegades; 4/162 (19.4 overs)
Dane van Niekerk 62 (47); Harmanpreet Kaur 2/31 (4 overs)		Harmanpreet Kaur 73* (46); Megan Schutt 2/18 (4 overs)

Melbourne Renegades won by 6 wickets (with 2 balls remaining)
Lilac Hill Park, Perth
Umpires: Nathan Johnstone and Jamie Thomas
Player of the match: Harmanpreet Kaur (Melbourne Renegades)

- Adelaide Strikers won the toss and elected to bat.
- Broadcast by Cricket Network and Foxtel

Match 30
3 November 2021
13:50
Scorecard

Perth Scorchers; 2/194 (20 overs)	v	Melbourne Renegades; 6/154 (20 overs)
Beth Mooney 101* (63); Harmanpreet Kaur 1/32 (3 overs)		Courtney Webb 46 (34); Lilly Mills 4/25 (3 overs)

Perth Scorchers won by 40 runs
WACA Ground, Perth
Umpires: Jarryd Buscall and Nathan Johnstone
Player of the match: Beth Mooney (Perth Scorchers)

- Perth Scorchers won the toss and elected to bat.
- Broadcast by Cricket Network and Foxtel

Match 31
6 November 2021
9:45
Scorecard

Melbourne Renegades; 4/207 (20 overs)	v	Brisbane Heat; 192 (20 overs)
Harmanpreet Kaur 65 (32); Grace Harris 1/29 (3 overs)		Laura Kimmince 42 (21); Ellie Falconer 4/29 (4 overs)

Melbourne Renegades won by 15 runs
Karen Rolton Oval, Adelaide
Umpires: Shawn Craig and Harsimran Singh
Player of the match: Harmanpreet Kaur (Melbourne Renegades)

- Brisbane Heat won the toss and elected to field.
- Broadcast by Cricket Network and Foxtel
- The combined team totals of 399 runs set a new record for highest match aggregate in WBBL history.

Match 35
7 November 2021
13:10
Scorecard

Melbourne Stars; 103 (20 overs)	v	Melbourne Renegades; 3/104 (14.1 overs)
Kim Garth 32 (24); Harmanpreet Kaur 3/22 (4 overs)		Jemimah Rodrigues 45 (38); Kim Garth 2/23 (4 overs)

Melbourne Renegades won by 7 wickets (with 35 balls remaining)
Adelaide Oval, Adelaide
Umpires: Simon Lightbody and Eloise Sheridan
Player of the match: Sophie Molineux (Melbourne Renegades)

- Melbourne Stars won the toss and elected to bat.
- Broadcast by Seven Network and Foxtel

Match 42
11 November 2021
16:20 (D/N)
Scorecard

Melbourne Renegades	v	Melbourne Stars

Match abandoned
Karen Rolton Oval, Adelaide
Umpires: Eloise Sheridan and David Taylor

- No toss
- No play was possible due to rain.
- Broadcast by Cricket Network and Foxtel

Match 48
17 November 2021
18:05 (N)
Scorecard

Melbourne Renegades; 4/175 (20 overs)	v	Sydney Thunder; 2/171 (20 overs)
Harmanpreet Kaur 81* (55); Samantha Bates 2/21 (4 overs)		Smriti Mandhana 114* (64); Rhiann O'Donnell 1/25 (3 overs)

Melbourne Renegades won by 4 runs
Harrup Park, Mackay
Umpires: Joshua Adie and Nathan James
Player of the match: Smriti Mandhana (Sydney Thunder)

- Sydney Thunder won the toss and elected to field.
- Broadcast by Cricket Network and Foxtel
- Smriti Mandhana (Sydney Thunder) equalled the WBBL record for most runs scored in an innings.
- Sydney Thunder were eliminated from finals contention.

Match 49
19 November 2021
14:40
Scorecard

Hobart Hurricanes; 5/161 (20 overs)	v	Melbourne Renegades; 109 (18 overs)
Ruth Johnston 63 (46); Courtney Webb 2/27 (4 overs)		Ellie Falconer 24* (12); Sasha Moloney 3/17 (3 overs)

Hobart Hurricanes won by 52 runs
Harrup Park, Mackay
Umpires: Stephen Dionysius and Nathan James
Player of the match: Ruth Johnston (Hobart Hurricanes)

- Melbourne Renegades won the toss and elected to field.
- Broadcast by Cricket Network and Foxtel

Match 54
20 November 2021
18:05 (N)
Scorecard

Brisbane Heat; 5/156 (20 overs)	v	Melbourne Renegades; 113 (18.1 overs)
Georgia Redmayne 71 (51); Rhiann O'Donnell 2/26 (3 overs)		Josie Dooley 35 (27); Jess Jonassen 3/10 (3.1 overs)

Brisbane Heat won by 43 runs
Harrup Park, Mackay
Umpires: Steven Farrell and Nathan James
Player of the match: Georgia Redmayne (Brisbane Heat)

- Brisbane Heat won the toss and elected to bat.
- Broadcast by Cricket Network and Foxtel

=== Challenger ===
25 November 2021
18:40 (N)
Scorecard

Melbourne Renegades; 8/83 (20 overs)	v	Adelaide Strikers; 1/86 (10.5 overs)
Ella Hayward 18* (23); Darcie Brown 2/9 (4 overs)		Dane van Niekerk 43 (30); Carly Leeson 1/5 (1 over)

Adelaide Strikers won by 9 wickets (with 55 balls remaining)
Adelaide Oval, Adelaide
Umpires: Simon Lightbody and Eloise Sheridan
Player of the match: Darcie Brown (Adelaide Strikers)

- Adelaide Strikers won the toss and elected to field.
- Broadcast by Seven Network and Foxtel

== Statistics and awards ==
- Most runs: Harmanpreet Kaur – 406 (8th in the league)
- Highest score in an innings: Harmanpreet Kaur – 81* (55) vs Sydney Thunder, 17 November 2021
- Most wickets: Harmanpreet Kaur – 15 (equal 9th in the league)
- Best bowling figures in an innings: Ellie Falconer – 4/29 (4 overs) vs Brisbane Heat, 6 November 2021
- Most catches (fielder): Harmanpreet Kaur – 8 (equal 5th in the league)
- Player of the Match awards:
  - Harmanpreet Kaur – 3
  - Jess Duffin, Sophie Molineux, Jemimah Rodrigues, Georgia Wareham – 1 each
- WBBL|07 Player of the Tournament: Harmanpreet Kaur (1st)
- WBBL|07 Team of the Tournament: Harmanpreet Kaur, Simon Helmot (coach)
- Renegades Player of the Season: Harmanpreet Kaur
