= 2018–19 Melbourne Renegades WBBL season =

Melbourne Renegades
2018–19 season
- Melbourne Renegades 2018–19 cap logo
- Coach: Tim Coyle
- Captain(s): Amy Satterthwaite
- Home ground: CitiPower Centre
- League: WBBL
- Record: 7–6 (4th)
- Finals: Semi-finalists
- Leading Run Scorer: Danielle Wyatt – 368
- Leading Wicket Taker: Molly Strano – 19
- Player of the Season: Sophie Molineux

The 2018–19 Melbourne Renegades Women's season was the fourth in the team's history. Coached by Tim Coyle and captained by Amy Satterthwaite, they finished fourth in the regular season of WBBL|04 and qualified for finals for the first time in the team's history.

In a "heartbreaking" and "thrilling" semi-final loss at Drummoyne Oval—notable for its "miracle" last-ball finish, resulting in the run out of Sophie Molineux and forcing a super over—the Renegades were knocked out of the tournament by the defending champions, the Sydney Sixers.

== Squad ==
Each 2018–19 squad featured 15 active players, with an allowance of up to five marquee signings including a maximum of three from overseas. Under a new rule, Australian marquees were classed as players who held a national women's team contract at the time of signing on for their WBBL|04 team.

Personnel changes for the Renegades ahead of the season included:

- England's Danielle Wyatt returned to the squad, having played in the first two seasons before missing WBBL|03.
- Sri Lankan Chamari Atapattu was not re-signed for WBBL|04.
- Former Australian player Kris Britt retired at the end of WBBL|03.
- Rhiann O'Donnell departed the team and joined the Hobart Hurricanes.
- Although a permanent resident in Australia, Hayley Jensen would no longer be classified as a local player due to earning re-selection for her native New Zealand during 2018. The Renegades chose not to sign her as an overseas marquee, therefore excluding her from the squad. She would go on to be contracted by the Perth Scorchers as a marquee replacement later in the season.

The table below lists the Renegades players and their key stats (including runs scored, batting strike rate, wickets taken, economy rate, catches and stumpings) for the season.

No.	Name	Nat.	Date of birth	Batting style	Bowling style	G	R	SR	W	E	C	S	Notes
Batters
27	Jess Duffin	(Australia)	27 June 1989	Right-handed	Right-arm leg spin	13	263	108.23	–	–	7	–	
55	Claire Koski	(Australia)	13 March 1991	Right-handed	Right-arm medium fast	13	154	103.35	–	–	3	–	
9	Anna Lanning	(Australia)	25 March 1994	Right-handed	Right-arm medium	–	–	–	–	–	–	–	
17	Amy Satterthwaite	(New Zealand)	7 October 1986	Left-handed	Right-arm off spin	15	325	101.24	3	7.61	5	–	Captain, overseas marquee
11	Courtney Webb	(Australia)	30 November 1999	Right-handed	Right-arm medium	12	93	100.00	0	12.00	0	–	
28	Danielle Wyatt	(England)	22 April 1991	Right-handed	Right-arm off spin	14	368	111.51	0	7.33	4	–	Overseas marquee
All-rounders
23	Sophie Molineux	(Australia)	17 January 1998	Left-handed	Left-arm orthodox	14	354	114.56	16	6.97	7	–	
Wicketkeepers
19	Emma Inglis	(Australia)	15 July 1988	Right-handed	–	14	62	84.93	–	–	8	4	
15	Erica Kershaw	(Australia)	23 December 1991	Left-handed	–	7	80	88.88	–	–	1	1	
Bowlers
77	Maitlan Brown	(Australia)	5 June 1997	Right-handed	Right-arm fast medium	12	59	92.18	9	7.23	6	–	
14	Zoe Cooke	(Australia)	17 September 1995	Right-handed	Right-arm fast medium	–	–	–	–	–	–	–	
5	Molly Strano	(Australia)	5 October 1992	Right-handed	Right-arm off spin	15	33	76.74	19	6.42	4	–	
6	Lea Tahuhu	(New Zealand)	23 September 1990	Right-handed	Right-arm fast	15	12	120.00	14	5.92	2	–	Overseas marquee
7	Tayla Vlaeminck	(Australia)	27 October 1998	Right-handed	Right-arm fast	6	–	–	4	8.16	3	–	
32	Georgia Wareham	(Australia)	26 May 1999	Right-handed	Right-arm leg spin	15	21	91.30	11	5.90	3	–	

== Ladder ==
Pos	Team	Pld	W	L	NR	Pts	NRR
1	Sydney Sixers (RU)	14	10	4	0	20	0.509
2	Sydney Thunder	14	9	4	1	19	0.479
3	Brisbane Heat (C)	14	9	5	0	18	1.118
4	Melbourne Renegades	14	7	6	1	15	−0.079
5	Perth Scorchers	14	7	7	0	14	−0.476
6	Adelaide Strikers	14	5	8	1	11	−0.336
7	Melbourne Stars	14	5	8	1	11	−0.905
8	Hobart Hurricanes	14	2	12	0	4	−0.364

- The four top ranked teams qualified for the play-off phase

== Fixtures ==
All times are local time

=== Regular season ===
Match 4
2 December 2018
13:50
Scorecard

Melbourne Renegades; 8/98 (20 overs)	v	Sydney Thunder; 4/99 (16.5 overs)
Erica Kershaw 24 (27); Rene Farrell 3/17 (4 overs)		Rachael Haynes 27 (25); Tayla Vlaeminck 4/29 (3.5 overs)

Sydney Thunder won by 6 wickets (with 19 balls remaining)
CitiPower Centre, St Kilda
Umpires: Greg Azzopardi and David Shepard
Player of the match: Rene Farrell (Sydney Thunder)

- Sydney Thunder won the toss and elected to field
- Broadcast by Seven Network and Fox Cricket

Match 7
8 December 2018
14:10
Scorecard

Adelaide Strikers; 7/153 (20.0 overs)	v	Melbourne Renegades; 4/154 (20.0 overs)
Suzie Bates 54 (44); Georgia Wareham 2/20 (4 overs)		Danielle Wyatt 62 (47); Amanda-Jade Wellington 3/27 (4 overs)

Melbourne Renegades won by 6 wickets (with 0 balls remaining)
CitiPower Centre, St Kilda
Umpires: Daryl Brigham and Mattis van Eck
Player of the match: Danielle Wyatt (Melbourne Renegades)

- Adelaide Strikers won the toss and elected to bat

Match 11
9 December 2018
14:10
Scorecard

Melbourne Renegades; 4/83 (14.3 overs)	v	Adelaide Strikers; 2/27 (4.3 overs)
Sophie Molineux 44* (37); Megan Schutt 2/9 (2 overs)		Sophie Devine 13 (9); Lea Tahuhu 1/1 (0.3 overs)

No result
Eastern Oval, Ballarat
Umpires: Dale Ireland and Greg Azzopardi

- Adelaide Strikers won the toss and elected to field
- Melbourne Renegades' innings reduced to 14.3 overs due to rain delay
- Adelaide Strikers' target revised to 78 runs from 11 overs
- Match abandoned due to further rain delays

Match 19
16 December 2018
14:10
Scorecard

Brisbane Heat; 8/174 (20 overs)	v	Melbourne Renegades; 7/153 (20 overs)
Sammy-Jo Johnson 31 (10); Molly Strano 4/21 (4 overs)		Amy Satterthwaite 38 (33); Sune Luus 2/16 (2 overs)

Brisbane Heat won by 21 runs
Geelong Cricket Ground, Geelong
Umpires: Greg Azzopardi and Daryl Brigham
Player of the match: Molly Strano (Melbourne Renegades)

- Brisbane Heat won the toss and elected to bat

Match 25
22 December
16:30
Scorecard

Perth Scorchers; 6/122 (20 overs)	v	Melbourne Renegades; 6/123 (17.1 overs)
Heather Graham 42 (41); Lea Tahuhu 2/12 (2 overs)		Jess Duffin 35 (31); Nicole Bolton 3/28 (4 overs)

Melbourne Renegades won by 4 wickets (with 17 balls remaining)
WACA Ground, Perth
Umpires: J Paterson and James Hewitt
Player of the match: Heather Graham (Perth Scorchers)

- Melbourne Renegades won the toss and elected to field

Match 28
23 December
14:00
Scorecard

Perth Scorchers; 2/172 (20 overs)	v	Melbourne Renegades; 6/157 (20 overs)
Meg Lanning 75 (50); Molly Strano 1/29 (3 overs)		Danielle Wyatt 42 (34); Heather Graham 2/32 (4 overs)

Perth Scorchers won by 15 runs
WACA Ground, Perth
Umpires: Dean Trigg and Ashlee Gibbons
Player of the match: Meg Lanning (Perth Scorchers)

- Melbourne Renegades won the toss and elected to field

Match 31
27 December
14:50
Scorecard

Melbourne Renegades; 8/110 (20 overs)	v	Sydney Sixers; 3/111 (14.1 overs)
Maitlan Brown 33 (30); Lauren Cheatle 2/6 (2 overs)		Alyssa Healy 70* (42); Molly Strano 3/26 (4 overs)

Sydney Sixers won by 7 wickets (with 35 balls remaining)
Sydney Cricket Ground, Sydney
Umpires: Berend du Plessis and Ryan Nelson
Player of the match: Alyssa Healy (Sydney Sixers)

- Melbourne Renegades won the toss and elected to bat

Match 34
29 December
14:50
Scorecard

Melbourne Stars; 130 (19.5 overs)	v	Melbourne Renegades; 9/131 (19.5 overs)
Lizelle Lee 36 (26); Amy Satterthwaite 3/16 (3 overs)		Amy Satterthwaite 37 (33); Holly Ferling 2/14 (3 overs)

Melbourne Renegades won by 1 wicket (with 1 ball remaining)
Marvel Stadium, Melbourne
Umpires: Daryl Brigham and Mattis van Eck
Player of the match: Amy Satterthwaite (Melbourne Renegades)

- Melbourne Renegades won the toss and elected to field

The Renegades recorded the second one-wicket victory in the league's history when Lea Tahuhu, a fast bowler not known for her batting ability, hit the winning single off leg spinning Stars captain Kristen Beams with just one ball to spare. Courtney Webb, on 21 not out, was the set batter at the non-striker's end.

Match 39
1 January
14:50
Scorecard

Melbourne Renegades; 5/149 (20 overs)	v	Melbourne Stars; 7/101 (20 overs)
Sophie Molineux 78* (54); Holly Ferling 2/30 (4 overs)		Georgia Elwiss 22 (25); Molly Strano 3/25 (4 overs)

Melbourne Renegades won by 48 runs
Melbourne Cricket Ground, Melbourne
Attendance: 11,136
Umpires: Greg Azzopardi and Daryl Brigham
Player of the match: Sophie Molineux (Melbourne Renegades)

- Melbourne Stars won the toss and elected to field
- Played as a double-header before a men's BBL match

Match 41
3 January
14:50
Scorecard

Hobart Hurricanes; 8/115 (20 overs)	v	Melbourne Renegades; 5/119 (18.1 overs)
Corinne Hall 37 (30); Sophie Molineux 2/22 (4 overs)		Amy Satterthwaite 27 (35); Sasha Maloney 3/20 (4 overs)

Melbourne Renegades won by 5 wickets (with 11 balls remaining)
GMHBA Stadium, Geelong
Umpires: Dale Ireland and David Shepard
Player of the match: Sophie Molineux (Melbourne Renegades)

- Hobart Hurricanes won the toss and elected to bat
- Broadcast by Seven Network and Fox Cricket

Match 46
6 January
15:00
Scorecard

Melbourne Renegades; 3/143 (20 overs)	v	Brisbane Heat; 118 (18.5 overs)
Sophie Molineux 50 (52); Sune Luus 1/24 (3 overs)		Beth Mooney 44 (31); Lea Tahuhu 3/13 (4 overs)

Melbourne Renegades won by 25 runs
Harrup Park, Mackay
Attendance: 2,563
Umpires: Steven Farrell and David Taylor
Player of the match: Sophie Molineux (Melbourne Renegades)

- Melbourne Renegades won the toss and elected to bat

Match 47
8 January
13:50
Scorecard

Melbourne Renegades; 4/139 (20 overs)	v	Sydney Thunder; 4/141 (19.1 overs)
Danni Wyatt 59 (53); Nicola Carey 2/25 (3 overs)		Alex Blackwell 66* (48); Lea Tahuhu 1/23 (4 overs)

Sydney Thunder won by 6 wickets (with 5 balls remaining)
Spotless Stadium, Sydney
Umpires: T Penman and Donovan Koch
Player of the match: Alex Blackwell (Sydney Thunder)

- Sydney Thunder won the toss and elected to field
- Broadcast by Seven Network and Fox Cricket

Match 52
12 January
13:00
Scorecard

Melbourne Renegades; 6/146 (20 overs)	v	Hobart Hurricanes; 6/143 (20 overs)
Amy Satterthwaite 66 (57); Alex Hartley 3/21 (4 overs)		Erin Fazackerley 52 (41); Lea Tahuhu 1/18 (4 overs)

Melbourne Renegades won by 3 runs
CitiPower Centre, Melbourne
Umpires: Dale Ireland and Greg Azzopardi
Player of the match: Amy Satterthwaite (Melbourne Renegades)

- Hobart Hurricanes won the toss and elected to field

Match 55
13 January
14:50
Scorecard

Sydney Sixers; 2/136 (20 overs)	v	Melbourne Renegades; 8/107 (20 overs)
Ellyse Perry 67* (62); Georgia Wareham 1/26 (3 overs)		Jess Duffin 39 (39); Marizanne Kapp 2/19 (4 overs)

Sydney Sixers won by 29 runs
GMHBA Stadium, Geelong
Umpires: Daryl Brigham and Mattis van Eck
Player of the match: Erin Burns (Sydney Sixers)

- Sydney Sixers won the toss and elected to bat

=== Knockout phase ===
Semi-final 2
19 January
13:50
Scorecard

Sydney Sixers; 4/131 (20 overs)	v	Melbourne Renegades; 6/131 (20 overs)
Ellyse Perry 54* (59); Lea Tahuhu 1/18 (4 overs)		Sophie Molineux 55 (54); Erin Burns 2/13 (3 overs)

Match tied (Sydney Sixers won the one over eliminator)
Drummoyne Oval, Sydney
Umpires: Claire Polosak and Donovan Koch
Player of the match: Ellyse Perry (Sydney Sixers)

- Sydney Sixers won the toss and elected to bat
- Broadcast by Seven Network and Fox Cricket
- Ellyse Perry became the first player to score 700 runs in a WBBL season

In the Renegades' first finals appearance, with three runs required off the last ball for an upset victory, Sophie Molineux was short of her ground attempting the winning run due to a "miracle" piece of team fielding by Sixers players Erin Burns, Sarah Aley and Alyssa Healy. In the resulting super over, Sixers captain Ellyse Perry hit a six off Molly Strano to eliminate the Renegades from the tournament. The match, in conjunction with the other semi-final played earlier in the day, was hailed as a showcase of "the irrefutable rise of women's cricket" and "sport with drama, skill and unpredictability – a potent recipe for success".

== Statistics and awards ==
- Most runs: Danielle Wyatt – 368 (11th in the league)
- Highest score in an innings: Sophie Molineux – 78* (54) vs Melbourne Stars, 1 January
- Most wickets: Molly Strano – 19 (equal 5th in the league)
- Best bowling figures in an innings: Molly Strano – 4/21 (4 overs) vs Brisbane Heat, 16 December
- Most catches (fielder): Jess Duffin, Sophie Molineux – 7 (equal 9th in the league)
- Player of the Match awards:
  - Sophie Molineux – 3
  - Amy Satterthwaite – 2
  - Molly Strano, Danielle Wyatt – 1 each
- Renegades Player of the Season: Sophie Molineux
- WBBL|04 Player of the Tournament: Sophie Molineux (equal 4th)
- WBBL|04 Team of the Tournament: Molly Strano, Sophie Molineux (twelfth man)
- WBBL|04 Young Gun Award: Georgia Wareham (winner)
