= 2024–25 Melbourne Renegades WBBL season =

Melbourne Renegades
2024–25 season
- Melbourne Renegades 2022–23 cap logo
- Coach: Simon Helmot
- Captain(s): Hayley Matthews
- Home ground: CitiPower Centre
- League: WBBL

The 2024–25 Melbourne Renegades Women's season 10th season of the Women's Big Bash League. Coached by Simon Helmot and captained by Hayley Matthews. They finished at the 8th place in the previous season's League stage.

== Squads ==
No.	Name	Nat.	Date of birth	Batting style	Bowling style	Notes
Batters
50	Hayley Matthews	(Barbados)	19 March 1998	Right-handed	Right-arm off spin	Overseas marquee
11	Courtney Webb	(Australia)	30 November 1999	Right-handed	Right-arm medium	
All-rounders
58	Chamari Athapaththu	(Sri Lanka)	9 February 1990	Left-handed	Right-arm off break	Overseas marquee (replacement)
8	Evelyn Jones	(England)	8 August 1992	Left-handed	Left-arm medium	Overseas marquee (replacement)
7	Harmanpreet Kaur	(India)	8 March 1989	Right-handed	Right-arm off spin	Overseas marquee (unavailable)
74	Carly Leeson	(Australia)	9 November 1998	Right-handed	Right-arm medium	
Wicket-keeper
19	Paris Bowdler	(Australia)	24 November 2004	Right-handed	–	Replacement player; † × 1 inns
3	Josie Dooley	(Australia)	21 January 2000	Right-handed	–	† × 10 inns
15	Erica Kershaw	(Australia)	23 December 1991	Right-handed	Right-arm leg spin	† × 2 inns
Bowlers
25	Sarah Coyte	(Australia)	30 March 1991	Right-handed	Right-arm medium	
12	Ella Hayward	(Australia)	8 September 2003	Right-handed	Right-arm off spin	
89	Shabnim Ismail	(South Africa)	5 October 1988	Left-handed	Right-arm fast	Overseas marquee
23	Sophie Molineux	(Australia)	17 January 1998	Left-handed	Left-arm orthodox	Captain
26	Rhiann O'Donnell	(Australia)	14 April 1998	Right-handed	Right-arm medium	
16	Georgia Prestwidge	(Australia)	17 December 1997	Right-handed	Right-arm medium	
	Tayla Vlaeminck	(Australia)	27 October 1998	Right-handed	Right-arm fast	Australian marquee (unavailable)
32	Georgia Wareham	(Australia)	26 May 1999	Right-handed	Right-arm leg spin	Australian marquee (unavailable)

== Standing ==
Pos	Team	Pld	W	L	T	NR	Pts	NRR	
1	Melbourne Renegades (C)	10	7	3	0	0	14	0.527	Advance to the play-off phase
2	Brisbane Heat (R)	10	7	3	0	0	14	0.384	Advance to the play-off phase
3	Sydney Thunder (3rd)	10	6	3	0	1	13	−0.002	Advance to the play-off phase
4	Hobart Hurricanes (4th)	10	5	5	0	0	10	0.189	Advance to the play-off phase
5	Perth Scorchers	10	4	5	1	0	9	−0.171	
6	Sydney Sixers	10	3	5	1	1	8	−0.477	
7	Adelaide Strikers	10	3	6	0	1	7	−0.357	
8	Melbourne Stars	10	2	7	0	1	5	−0.205	

Source: ESPNcricinfo
(C) Champions; (R) Runners-up
