= Ellie Falconer =

Australian cricketer (born 1999)

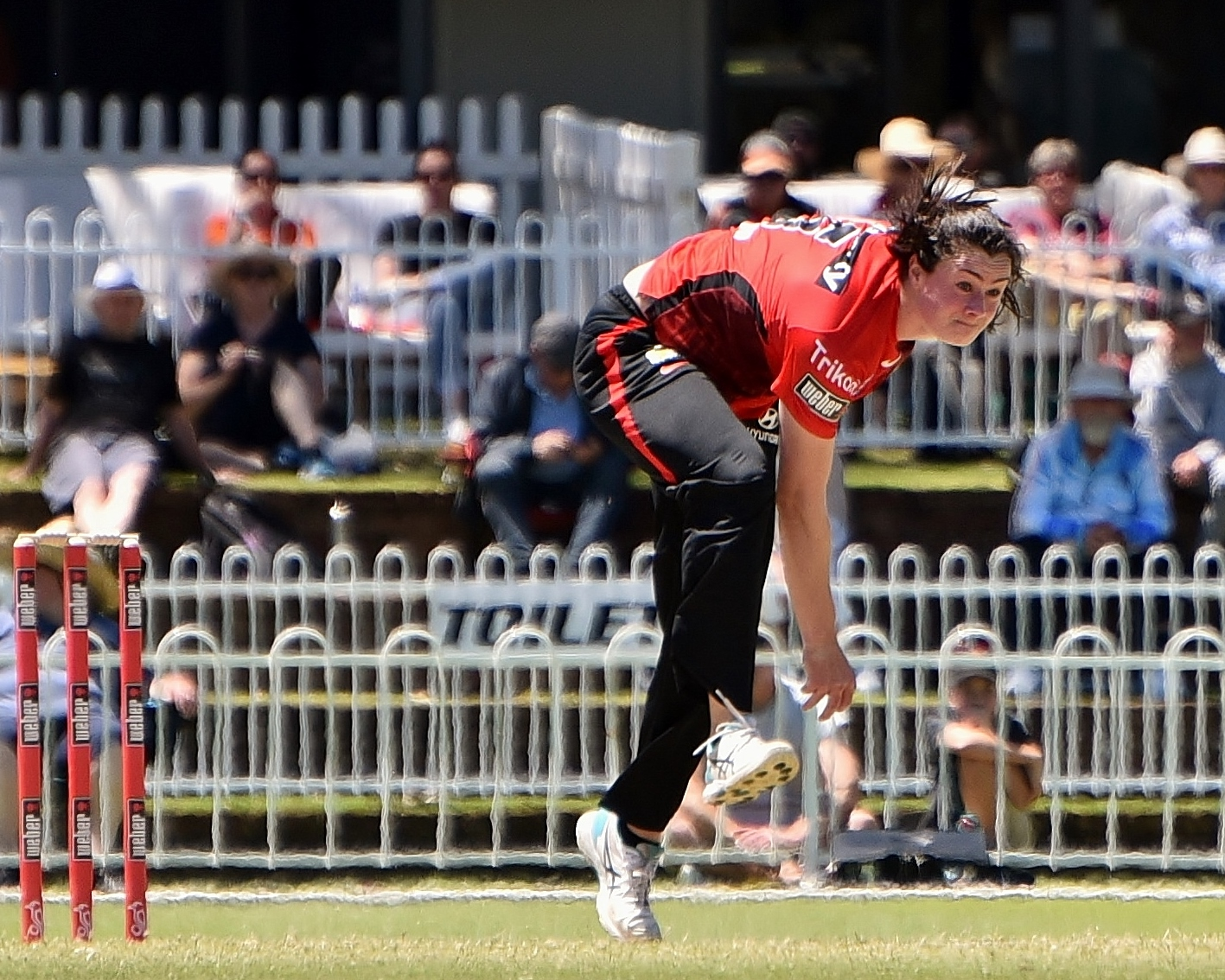
- Falconer bowling for Melbourne Renegades during WBBL|07

Personal information
- Full name: Ellie M Falconer
- Born: 3 August 1999 (age 27); Melrose, Scotland
- Batting: Right-handed
- Bowling: Right-arm medium
- Role: Bowler

Domestic team information
- Years: Team
- 2017/18–2022/23: South Australia
- 2017/18–2020/21: Adelaide Strikers
- 2021/22–present: Melbourne Renegades

Career statistics
Competition	WLA	WT20
Matches	25	17
Runs scored	166	79
Batting average	10.20	–
100s/50s	0/1	0/0
Top score	50*	27
Balls bowled	711	177
Wickets	21	10
Bowling average	30.81	26.20
5 wickets in innings	1	0
10 wickets in match	0	0
Best bowling	5/56	4/29
Catches/stumpings	1/–	1/–
- Source: CricketArchive, 18 March 2021

Ellie M Falconer (born 3 August 1999) is an Australian cricketer who plays as a right-handed batter and right-arm medium bowler for the Melbourne Renegades in the Women's Big Bash League (WBBL). She made her Scorpions debut on 22 September 2018 against Victoria, taking one wicket for 31 runs.
