= Melbourne Renegades (WBBL) =

Women's Twenty20 cricket team based in Melbourne

- League: Women's Big Bash League

Personnel
- Captain: Sophie Molineux
- Coach: Gavan Twining

Team information
- City: Melbourne
- Colours: Red
- Home ground: CitiPower Centre
- Secondary home ground: Eastern Oval

History
- Twenty20 debut: 11 December 2015
- WBBL wins: 1 (WBBL10)
- Official website: Melbourne Renegades
Regular kit
Indigenous kit

The Melbourne Renegades is an Australian women's Twenty20 cricket team based in Melbourne, Victoria. They are one of two teams from Melbourne to compete in the Women's Big Bash League, the other being the Melbourne Stars.

On 2 June 2026, it was reported that the brands of the Renegades and the Melbourne Stars would be merged into a new franchise, utilising the Stars' existing WBBL license. Nick Cummins, the CEO of Cricket Victoria (CV), has described the new team as "just a merger of brands and staff" and "not a merger of the teams". Two weeks later, it was confirmed that both the Renegades and the Stars would compete in the upcoming 2026–27 season under their existing names.

== History ==
=== Formation ===
One of eight founding WBBL teams, the Melbourne Renegades are aligned with the men's team of the same name. On 3 June 2015, Cricket Victoria announced Lachlan Stevens would "take charge of one of Melbourne's two WBBL teams". Stevens would be confirmed as inaugural head coach of the Renegades in the following months. At the official WBBL launch on 10 July, Sarah Elliott was unveiled as the team's first ever signing. Elliott would also become the inaugural captain.

The Renegades played their first match against the Hobart Hurricanes at Aurora Stadium in Launceston on 11 December, losing by 35 runs. It took until their fifth match, a 20 December encounter with the Brisbane Heat at the Gabba, to register a win.

=== Rivalries ===
==== Sydney Sixers ====
The Renegades and Sydney Sixers have combined to produce some of the most "thrilling" and "controversial" matches in the league's history, particularly revolving around close finishes, including:

- 3 January 2018, GMHBA Stadium: In "bizarre" scenes, Sixers batter Sarah Aley attempted to score a game-tying run on the last delivery despite Renegades wicket-keeper Emma Inglis, having received the ball over the stumps from fielder Kris Britt and thus believing the match to be over, already celebrating victory. After deliberation, officiating umpires deemed the ball was not dead and the run would be allowed, thereby forcing a super over which the Renegades nevertheless went on to win.
- 19 January 2019, Drummoyne Oval: In the Renegades' first finals appearance, with three runs required off the last ball for an upset victory, Sophie Molineux was short of her ground attempting the winning run due to a "miracle" piece of team fielding by Sixers players Erin Burns, Sarah Aley and Alyssa Healy. In the resulting super over, Sixers captain Ellyse Perry hit a six off Molly Strano to eliminate the Renegades from the tournament. The match, in conjunction with the other semi-final played earlier in the day, was hailed as a showcase of "the irrefutable rise of women's cricket" and "sport with drama, skill and unpredictability – a potent recipe for success".
- 17 November 2019, Drummoyne Oval: The Renegades, requiring 28 runs off the last 12 balls with only three wickets in hand, pulled off a "great escape" victory against the Sixers through a last-ball six from Courtney Webb against the bowling of Marizanne Kapp. It marked the first time a WBBL team had won a match when needing more than four runs off the final legal delivery. (Note: In a 20 January 2017 match, the Melbourne Stars initially required 6 runs off the last ball but the Hobart Hurricanes conceded a boundary off a no-ball, and the Stars went on to score just one run off the final legal delivery to secure victory. The bowler was Amy Satterthwaite and the on-strike batter was Jess Duffin—two future Renegades captains who would both coincidentally miss the 17 November 2019 game due to pregnancy-related reasons.) The ramifications of the result were season-shaping as the Renegades went on to edge out the Sixers for fourth spot on the ladder, making it the first season the Sixers would fail to qualify for finals.

==== Melbourne Stars ====
The Renegades hold an 8–4 record over their cross-town rivals, the Melbourne Stars. Noteworthy matches include:

- 1 January 2017, Melbourne Cricket Ground: Played in front of a reported crowd of 24,547—as part of a double-header with the men's BBL, setting a new record for the highest non-standalone WBBL attendance—the rain-affected match ended in anticlimactic fashion with the Renegades adjudged nine-wicket winners via the Duckworth–Lewis–Stern method. Stars captain Meg Lanning initially protested the ruling with officiating umpires, claiming she had been given false information about the par score by the match referee.
- 20 January 2018, Melbourne Cricket Ground: Chasing 119 for victory, Renegades captain Amy Satterthwaite—who looked to have been run out earlier in the innings and left the field, but was recalled after TV replays showed wicket-keeper Nicole Faltum had dislodged the bails prematurely—hit a six off the final delivery against the bowling of Georgia Elwiss to tie the game. With scores still level after the super over, the Stars were awarded the win on the boundary count back rule.
- 29 December 2018, Docklands Stadium: The Renegades recorded the second one-wicket victory in the league's history when Lea Tahuhu, a fast bowler not known for her batting ability, hit the winning single off Stars captain Kristen Beams with just one ball to spare. Courtney Webb, on 21 not out, was the set batter at the non-striker's end.

==== Brisbane Heat ====
Despite winning multiple championships in the league's early years, the Brisbane Heat have relatively struggled against the Renegades. Across the competition's first five seasons, the Renegades were the only team to beat the Heat more often than not. Noteworthy matches include:

- 23 December 2017, Docklands Stadium: Batting first, the Heat were bowled out for 66, equalling the WBBL record for lowest all out total. The Renegades chased the target down with ten wickets in hand and 55 balls remaining, also setting a new WBBL record for largest victory by a team batting second.
- 27 November 2019, Allan Border Field: Targeting 184 runs to win, the Renegades set a new WBBL record for highest successful chase by sealing victory with six wickets in hand and six balls remaining.
- 7 December 2019, Allan Border Field: The Heat, on their way to a second consecutive title, chased down the Renegades' total of 4/163 with four wickets and 12 balls to spare in the first-ever semi-final encounter between the two teams. Wicket-keeper Josie Dooley, having won a championship with Brisbane in the previous season, top-scored for the Renegades with 50 not out.

== Captaincy records ==
There have been nine captains in the Renegades' history, including matches featuring an acting captain.

Captain	Span	M	Won	Lost	Tied	NR	W–L%
Sarah Elliott	2015–16	10	3	7	0	0	30.00
Molly Strano	2016–19	2	1	1	0	0	50.00
Rachel Priest	2016–17	16	6	10	0	0	37.50
Kris Britt	2016	1	1	0	0	0	100.00
Amy Satterthwaite	2017–20	43	17	23	0	3	42.50
Jess Duffin	2019	14	7	7	0	0	50.00
Sophie Molineux	2021–25	40	18	19	0	3	48.65
Hayley Matthews	2022–24	20	7	13	0	0	35
Georgia Wareham	2025	4	2	2	0	0	50

Source: (Note: ESPNcricinfo erroneously credited Chamari Atapattu as the Renegades' captain for a match on 24 January 2018.)

== Season summaries ==
Chart of yearly table positions for Melbourne Renegades in WBBL

Season	W–L	Pos.	Finals	Coach	Captain	Most Runs	Most Wickets	Most Valuable Player	Refs
2015–16	4–10	8th	DNQ	Lachlan Stevens	Sarah Elliott (Note: Rachel Priest stood in as acting captain for two games. Kris Britt and Molly Strano also stood in as acting captain for one game each.)	Dane van Niekerk – 275	Molly Strano – 18	Molly Strano	
2016–17	6–8	7th	DNQ	Lachlan Stevens	Rachel Priest	Kris Britt – 290	Molly Strano – 21	Molly Strano	
2017–18	6–8	6th	DNQ	Tim Coyle	Amy Satterthwaite	Amy Satterthwaite – 368	Lea Tahuhu – 17	Amy Satterthwaite*	
2018–19	7–6	4th	SF	Tim Coyle	Amy Satterthwaite	Danni Wyatt – 368	Molly Strano – 19	Sophie Molineux	
2019	8–6	4th	SF	Tim Coyle	Jess Duffin (Note: Molly Strano stood in as acting captain for one game.)	Jess Duffin – 544	Molly Strano – 24*	Jess Duffin	
2020	4–8	7th	DNQ	Lachlan Stevens	Amy Satterthwaite	Lizelle Lee – 261	Carly Leeson and Sophie Molineux – 11	Courtney Webb	
2021	8–4	2nd	CF	Simon Helmot	Sophie Molineux	Harmanpreet Kaur – 406	Harmanpreet Kaur – 15	Harmanpreet Kaur*	
2022	4–9	7th	DNQ	Simon Helmot	Sophie Molineux (Note: Hayley Matthews stood in as acting captain for two games.)	Hayley Matthews – 253	Shabnim Ismail and Sophie Molineux – 11	Sophie Molineux	
2023	2–12	8th	DNQ	Simon Helmot	Hayley Matthews	Harmanpreet Kaur – 321	Hayley Matthews and Georgia Wareham - 14	Georgia Wareham	
2024	7–3	1st	C	Simon Helmot	Sophie Molineux (Note: Hayley Matthews stood in as acting captain for four games.)	Hayley Matthews – 324	Sophie Molineux – 16	Sophie Molineux	
2025	5–5	5th	DNQ	Simon Helmot	Sophie Molineux (Note: Georgia Wareham stood in as acting captain for four games.)	Georgia Wareham – 277	Georgia Wareham – 19* (Note: Ashleigh Gardner also took 19 wickets.)	Georgia Wareham*	

Legend
DNQ	Did not qualify	SF	Semi-finalists	*	Led the league
EF	Lost the Eliminator	RU	Runners-up	^	League record
KF	Lost the Knockout	CF	Lost the Challenger	C	Champions

== Home grounds ==
Venue	Games hosted by season											
Venue	01	02	03	04	05	06	07	08	09	10	11	Total
Camberwell Sports Ground	–	2	4	–	–	N/A (Note: The Renegades did not host any games in WBBL|06 and WBBL|07 due to state border restrictions related to the COVID-19 pandemic.)		–	–	–	–	6
Docklands Stadium	1	2	1	1	–	N/A		–	–	–	–	5
CitiPower Centre	2	–	–	3	5	N/A		2	7	4	4	27
Eastern Oval	–	–	–	1	1	N/A		2	–	–	–	4
Geelong Cricket Ground	–	–	–	1	–	N/A		–	–	–	–	1
Kardinia Park	–	–	1	2	–	N/A		–	–	–	–	3
Melbourne Cricket Ground	–	–	–	–	–	N/A		–	–	1	–	1
Queen Elizabeth Oval	–	2	–	–	–	N/A		–	–	–	–	2
Ted Summerton Reserve	–	–	–	–	–	N/A		1	–	–	–	1

== Current squad ==
The squad of the Melbourne Renegades for the 2026 Women's Big Bash League season as of 15 October 2026.

- Players with international caps are listed in **bold**.

No.	Name	Nat.	Date of birth	Batting Style	Bowling Style	Additional Info.
Batters
33	Olivia Porter	Australia	14 November 2001 (age 25)	Right-handed	Right-arm medium	
11	Courtney Webb	Australia	30 November 1999 (age 26)	Right-handed	Right-arm medium	
25	**Annie Wikman**	Australia	27 April 2001 (age 25)	Right-handed	Right-arm medium	
All-rounders
5	**Deandra Dottin**	West Indies	21 June 1991 (age 35)	Right-handed	Right-arm medium	International Signing
25	Tess Flintoff	Australia	31 March 2003 (age 23)	Right-handed	Right-arm medium	
50	**Hayley Matthews**	West Indies	19 March 1998 (age 28)	Right-handed	Right-arm off spin	International Signing
23	**Sophie Molineux**	Australia	17 January 1998 (age 28)	Left-handed	Left-arm orthodox	Captain
25	**Chloe Tryon**	South Africa	25 January 1994 (age 32)	Right-handed	Left-arm orthodox	International Signing
32	**Georgia Wareham**	Australia	26 May 1999 (age 27)	Right-handed	Right-arm leg spin	
Wicket-keeper
4	Nicole Faltum	Australia	17 January 2000 (age 26)	Right-handed	—N/a	
20	Sophie Reid	Australia	28 September 1997 (age 29)	Left-handed	—N/a	
Bowlers
51	Milly Illingworth	Australia	15 July 2005 (age 21)	Right-handed	Right-arm fast	
22	Sara Kennedy	Australia	2 August 2007 (age 19)	Right-handed	Left-arm medium	
30	**Tayla Vlaeminck**	Australia	27 October 1998 (age 28)	Right-handed	Right-arm fast	

== Players ==
=== Australian representatives ===
(Australia) The following is a list of cricketers who have played for the Renegades after making their debut in the national women's team (the period they spent as both a Renegades squad member and an Australian-capped player is in brackets):

- Kris Britt (WBBL|01–03)
- Sarah Elliott (WBBL|01)
- Grace Harris (WBBL|02)
- Jess Duffin (WBBL|03–07)
- Molly Strano (WBBL|03–06)
- Sophie Molineux (WBBL|04–12)
- Georgia Wareham (WBBL|04–12)
- Tayla Vlaeminck (WBBL|04, 08–10, 12)
- Holly Ferling (WBBL|07)
- Sarah Coyte (WBBL|08–11)
- Naomi Stalenberg (WBBL|10–11)

=== Overseas marquees ===
The following is a list of cricketers who have played for the Renegades as overseas marquees: (Note: New Zealander Hayley Jensen was classed as a local player for the Renegades in WBBL|03 due to her permanent residence in Australia and having made a lack of recent international cricket appearances)

- (South Africa) Shabnim Ismail (WBBL|01, 08)
- (New Zealand) Rachel Priest (WBBL|01–02)
- (South Africa) Dane van Niekerk (WBBL|01)
- (England) Danni Wyatt-Hodge (WBBL|01–02, 04–05)
- (New Zealand) Lea Tahuhu (WBBL|02–06)
- (Sri Lanka) Chamari Atapattu (WBBL|03, 05, 08)
- (New Zealand) Amy Satterthwaite (WBBL|03–04, 06)
- (England) Tammy Beaumont (WBBL|05, 09)
- (South Africa) Lizelle Lee (WBBL|06)
- (New Zealand) Rosemary Mair (WBBL|06)
- (England) Evelyn Jones (WBBL|07–08)
- (India) Harmanpreet Kaur (WBBL|07–09)
- (India) Jemimah Rodrigues (WBBL|07)
- (Cricket West Indies) Hayley Matthews (WBBL|08–10, 12)
- (England) Alice Capsey (WBBL|10–11)
- (Cricket West Indies) Deandra Dottin (WBBL|10–12)
- (England) Grace Scrivens (WBBL|10)
- (England) Linsey Smith (WBBL|10)
- (England) Davina Perrin (WBBL|11)
- (England) Issy Wong (WBBL|11)
- (South Africa) Chloe Tryon (WBBL|12)

=== Associate rookies ===
- (Hong Kong) Mariko Hill (WBBL|01)
- (Nepal) Rubina Chhetri (WBBL|02)
- (Ireland) Gaby Lewis (WBBL|03)
- (United States) Tara Norris (WBBL|10)

== Administration and support staff ==
=== Current staff ===
Position	Name	ref
Head coach	Gavan Twining	

=== Managerial history ===
Name	Seasons
Simon Helmot	2021–2025

== Honours ==
- Champions: 1 – WBBL|10
- Runners-Up: 0
- Minor Premiers: 1 – WBBL|10
- Finals Series Appearances: 4 – WBBL|04, WBBL|05, WBBL|07, WBBL|10
- Wooden Spoons: 2 – WBBL|01, WBBL|09

== Statistics and awards ==
=== Team stats ===
- Win–loss record:

Opposition	M	Won	Lost	Tied	NR	W–L%
Adelaide Strikers	22	11	10	0	1	52.38
Brisbane Heat	22	10	11	0	1	47.62
Hobart Hurricanes	20	7	13	0	0	35
Melbourne Stars	22	11	9	0	2	55
Perth Scorchers	22	6	15	0	1	28.57
Sydney Sixers	21	7	13	0	1	35
Sydney Thunder	21	10	11	0	0	47.62
Total	150	62	82	0	6	43.06

- Highest score in an innings: 4/207 (20 overs) vs Brisbane Heat, 6 November 2021
- Highest successful chase: 1/186 (19 overs) vs Adelaide Strikers, 11 November 2024
- Lowest successful defence: 110 (20 overs) vs Sydney Thunder, 7 November 2020
- Largest victory:
  - Batting first: 81 runs vs Adelaide Strikers, 23 October 2023
  - Batting second: 55 balls remaining vs Brisbane Heat, 23 December 2017
- Longest winning streak: 8 matches (9 November 2024 – 11 November 2025)
- Longest losing streak: 8 matches (26 October – 12 November 2023)

=== Individual stats ===
- Most runs: Sophie Molineux – 1,742
- Highest score in an innings: Danni Wyatt-Hodge – 87 (55) vs Brisbane Heat, 27 November 2019
- Highest partnership: Sophie Molineux and Emma Inglis – 102* vs Hobart Hurricanes, 14 January 2018
- Most wickets: Molly Strano – 104
- Best bowling figures in an innings: Molly Strano – 5/15 (4 overs) vs Melbourne Stars, 2 January 2016
- Most catches (fielder): Georgia Wareham – 45
- Most dismissals (wicket-keeper): Josie Dooley – 41 (28 catches, 13 stumpings)

=== Individual awards ===
- Player of the Match:
  - Sophie Molineux – 13
  - Danni Wyatt-Hodge – 6
  - Amy Satterthwaite and Georgia Wareham – 5
  - Jess Duffin, Harmanpreet Kaur, Hayley Matthews, and Molly Strano – 4
  - Rachel Priest – 3
  - Courtney Webb – 2
  - Charis Bekker, Maitlan Brown, Alice Capsey, Deandra Dottin, Nicole Faltum, Grace Harris, Erica Kershaw, Anna Lanning, Lizelle Lee, Carly Leeson, Georgia Prestwidge, and Jemimah Rodrigues – 1
- WBBL Player of the Tournament:
  - Amy Satterthwaite – WBBL|03
  - Harmanpreet Kaur – WBBL|07
  - Georgia Wareham – WBBL|11
- WBBL Player of the Final:
  - Hayley Matthews – WBBL|10
- WBBL Team of the Tournament:
  - Molly Strano (3) – WBBL|02, WBBL|04, WBBL|05
  - Sophie Molineux (2) – WBBL|04, WBBL|10
  - Georgia Wareham (2) – WBBL|10, WBBL|11
  - Amy Satterthwaite – WBBL|03
  - Lea Tahuhu – WBBL|03
  - Jess Duffin – WBBL|05
  - Danni Wyatt-Hodge – WBBL|05
  - Harmanpreet Kaur – WBBL|07
  - Hayley Matthews – WBBL|10
- WBBL Young Gun Award:
  - Sophie Molineux – WBBL|03
  - Georgia Wareham – WBBL|04

== Sponsors ==
Year	Kit Manufacturer	Chest Sponsor	Back Sponsor	Breast Sponsor	Sleeve Sponsor
2015–16	Majestic	Rebel	VicHealth	VicHealth	Avalon Airport
2016–17	Majestic	Rebel	TAC	Carsales	Rebel
2017–18	Majestic	Rebel	TAC	Carsales	Rebel
2018–19	Majestic	Mars	TAC	Carsales	Rebel
2019–20	Majestic	Mars	Liberty Financial	Carsales	RMIT University
2020–21	Majestic	Liberty Financial	Liberty Financial	Simonds Homes	Rebel
2021–22	Nike	Liberty Financial	Liberty Financial	RACV Solar	Trikon
2022–23	Nike	Liberty Financial	Liberty Financial	RACV Solar	
2023–24	Nike	Liberty Financial	Liberty Financial	Marathon Foods	Hyundai
2024–25	Nike	Liberty Financial	Liberty Financial	RMIT University	Tangerine Telecom
2025–26	New Balance	Liberty Financial	Liberty Financial	RMIT University	Tangerine Telecom

== See also ==
- Melbourne Stars (WBBL)
- Victorian Cricket Association
- Victorian Spirit
