= Tim Coyle =

Australian cricketer and coach

Personal information
- Full name: Timothy Charles Coyle
- Born: 27 July 1960 (age 66); Launceston, Tasmania, Australia
- Batting: Left-handed
- Role: Wicket-keeper

Domestic team information
- Years: Team
- 1990/91: Tasmania

Career statistics
Competition	FC	LA
Matches	7	1
Runs scored	207	3
Batting average	18.81	–
100s/50s	0/1	0/0
Top score	55	3*
Catches/stumpings	23/–	0/1
- Source: Cricinfo, 4 January 2011

Timothy Charles Coyle (born 22 July 1960) is a former Australian cricketer, who played first class cricket for Tasmania. He has been the coach of Tasmania since 15 June 2005.

After being a member of St Patricks College's state title winning team in 1977, Coyle was a consistent wicket-keeper who failed to cement a regular place in the side, although he did represent his home state seven times in the 1990–91 season. Following his retirement from playing, Coyle became a regional coach in his home town of Launceston before being appointed as the Tasmanian Cricket Association's game development manager in 2000, a position he held for five years, before becoming senior coach for Tasmania.

During his coaching reign, he successfully guided Tasmania to their first ever Pura Cup title, winning the competition in the 2006–07 season.
