= Carly Leeson =

Australian cricketer

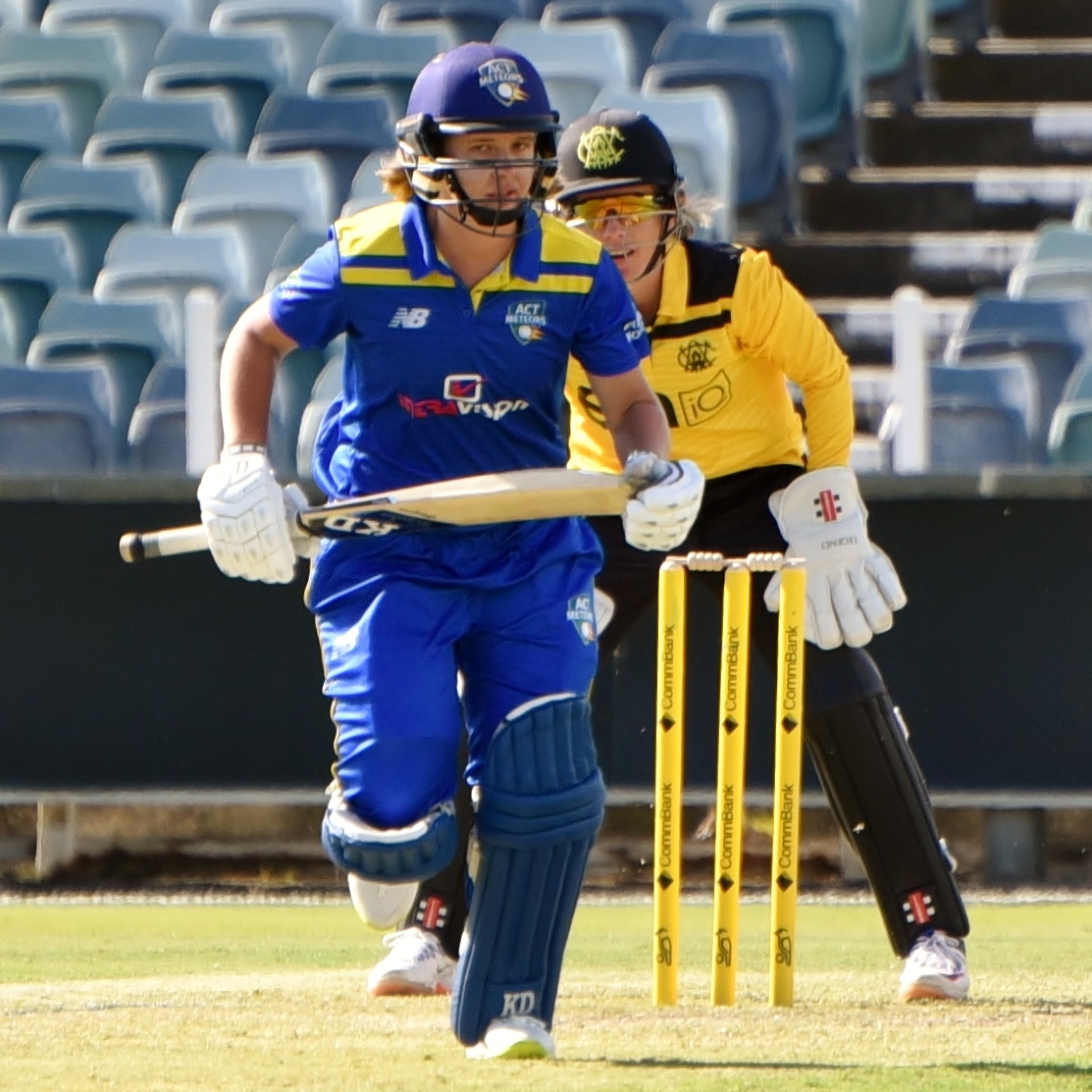
- Leeson batting for the ACT in September 2022

Personal information
- Full name: Carly May Leeson
- Born: 9 November 1998 (age 28); Grafton, New South Wales, Australia
- Batting: Right-handed
- Bowling: Right-arm medium
- Role: All-rounder

Domestic team information
- Years: Team
- 2016/17–2018/19: Sydney Sixers
- 2017/18–2018/19: New South Wales
- 2019/20–present: Australian Capital Territory
- 2019/20–2022/23: Melbourne Renegades
- 2024/25–present: Perth Scorchers

Career statistics
Competition	WLA	WT20
Matches	70	64
Runs scored	1,313	618
Batting average	21.17	16.26
100s/50s	0/8	0/2
Top score	96	68*
Balls bowled	2,290	647
Wickets	57	26
Bowling average	35.19	30.92
5 wickets in innings	0	0
10 wickets in match	0	0
Best bowling	4/33	3/14
Catches/stumpings	32/–	18/–
- Source: CricketArchive, 05 February 2026

Carly May Leeson (born 9 November 1998) is an Australian cricketer who plays for the ACT Meteors in the Women's National Cricket League (WNCL). An all-rounder, she bats right-handed and bowls right-arm medium pace. She has previously played for Sydney Sixers, New South Wales and Melbourne Renegades.

== Early life ==
Leeson was born on 9 November 1998 in Grafton, New South Wales. Her first season of cricket was the 2008/2009 season where she played for Harwood Island in the under12’s she was the only girl on the team. witch they later won that years grand final against the Lawrence cricket club. She represented New South Wales at under-15 and under-18 level and was a member of Australia's second-string Shooting Stars squad when they toured Sri Lanka in 2015.

== Club career ==
In February 2018, Leeson became the first woman to play in a men's grade cricket match for Randwick Petersham Cricket Club.

== Domestic career ==
=== Women's Big Bash League ===
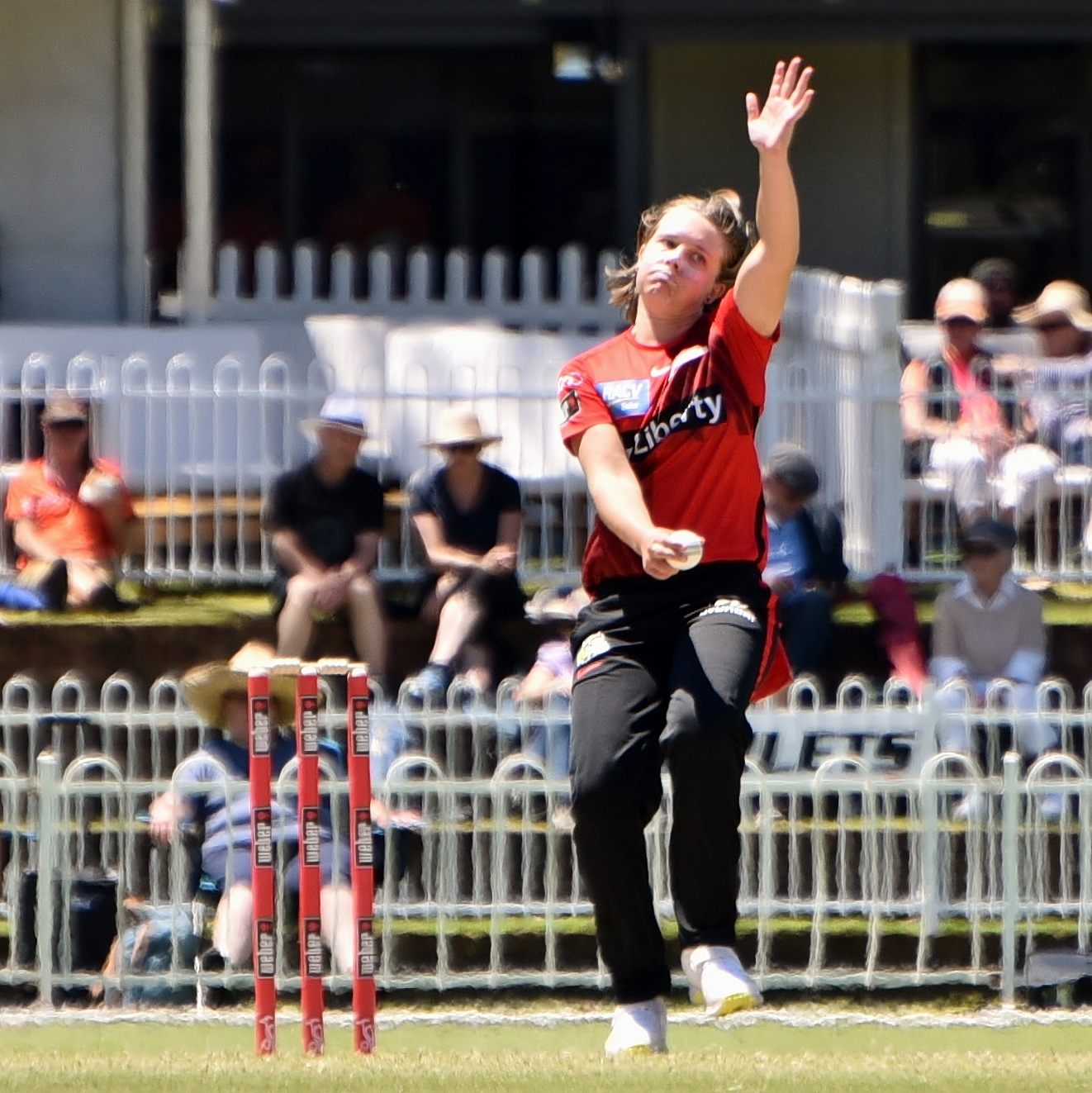
Leeson bowling for Melbourne Renegades during WBBL|07

Leeson joined the Sydney Sixers ahead of the 2016–17 WBBL season. She played one match, against the Melbourne Renegades, and took two wickets for 11 runs from her two overs.

Leeson joined the Melbourne Renegades for the 2019–20 season. Her 2020–21 season was her most successful WBBL as she took 11 wickets and made her T20 high score of 31*.

=== Women's National Cricket League ===
In the WNCL, Leeson joined the New South Wales Breakers ahead of the 2017–18 season, but did not play a match before joining the ACT Meteors in 2019.

On 23 January 2020, Leeson made her maiden one-day fifty, scoring 56 off 63 balls in a seven-wicket loss to the Breakers.
