= Rhiann O'Donnell =

Australian cricketer

Personal information
- Full name: Rhiann Kate O'Donnell
- Born: 14 April 1998 (age 28); Mildura, Victoria, Australia
- Batting: Right-handed
- Bowling: Right-arm medium
- Role: All-rounder

Domestic team information
- Years: Team
- 2017/18–2019/20: Victoria
- 2017/18: Melbourne Renegades
- 2018/19: Hobart Hurricanes
- 2021/22–present: Melbourne Renegades
- 2021/22–present: Victoria

Career statistics
Competition	WLA	WT20
Matches	32	24
Runs scored	295	52
Batting average	8.16	2.25
100s/50s	0/0	0/0
Top score	44	32
Balls bowled	618	200
Wickets	13	8
Bowling average	41.69	37.75
5 wickets in innings	0	0
10 wickets in match	0	0
Best bowling	3/43	2/25
Catches/stumpings	2/–	0/–
- Source: CricketArchive, 14 October 2021

Rhiann Kate O'Donnell (born 14 April 1998) is an Australian cricketer who plays for Melbourne Renegades in the Women's Big Bash League (WBBL). An all-rounder, she bats right-handed and bowls right-arm medium pace.

O'Donnell was previously part of the Renegades squad for the 2017–18 WBBL, but she did not make an appearance and joined Hobart Hurricanes for the 2018–19 season. She played six matches, taking two wickets and scoring nine runs before being released ahead of the 2019–20 season. Following a "fantastic" Victorian Premier Cricket season, she was re-signed by the Renegades for the 2021–22 WBBL.

In the WNCL, O'Donnell was signed by Victoria ahead of the 2017–18 season. She made her Victoria debut on 9 November 2018, taking two wickets but scoring a duck. She played four matches in 2018–19 and three in 2019–20 before being released from her state contract.
