= Erica Kershaw =

Australian cricketer (born 1991)

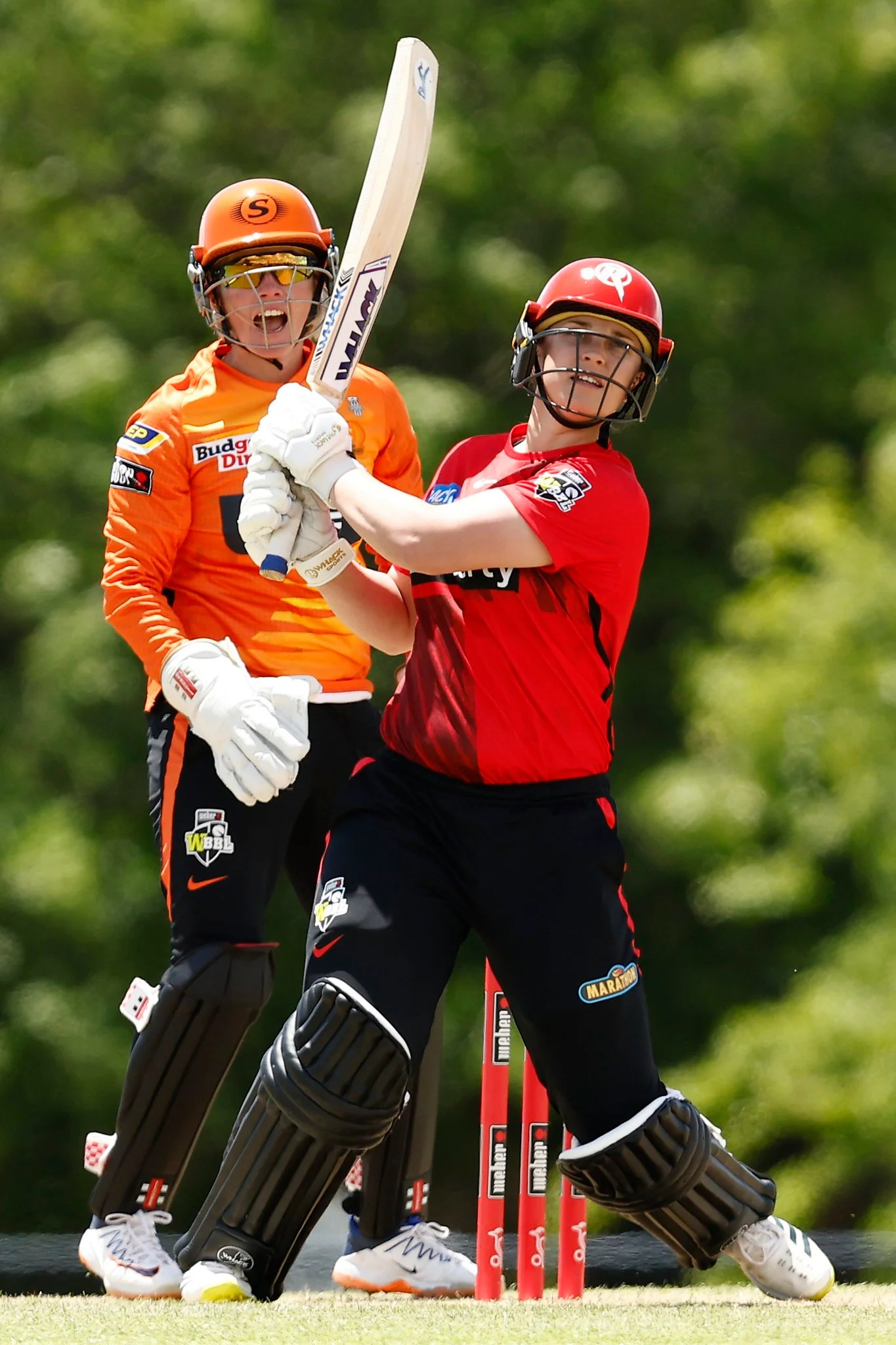
- Kershaw with the Melbourne Renegades in 2022

Personal information
- Full name: Erica Kershaw
- Born: 23 December 1991 (age 34); Castlemaine, Victoria, Australia
- Batting: Left-handed
- Role: Wicket-keeper

Domestic team information
- Years: Team
- 2010/11: Victoria
- 2015/16: Melbourne Renegades
- 2017/18–2021/22: Australian Capital Territory
- 2018/19–2019/20: Melbourne Renegades
- 2020/21: Hobart Hurricanes
- 2022/23–present: Melbourne Renegades

Career statistics
Competition	WLA	WT20
Matches	34	38
Runs scored	520	239
Batting average	20.28	9.00
100s/50s	0/3	0/0
Top score	69	34*
Balls bowled	–	6
Wickets	–	1
Bowling average	–	9.00
5 wickets in innings	–	0
10 wickets in match	–	0
Best bowling	–	1/9
Catches/stumpings	23/6	5/1
- Source: CricketArchive, 27 March 2021

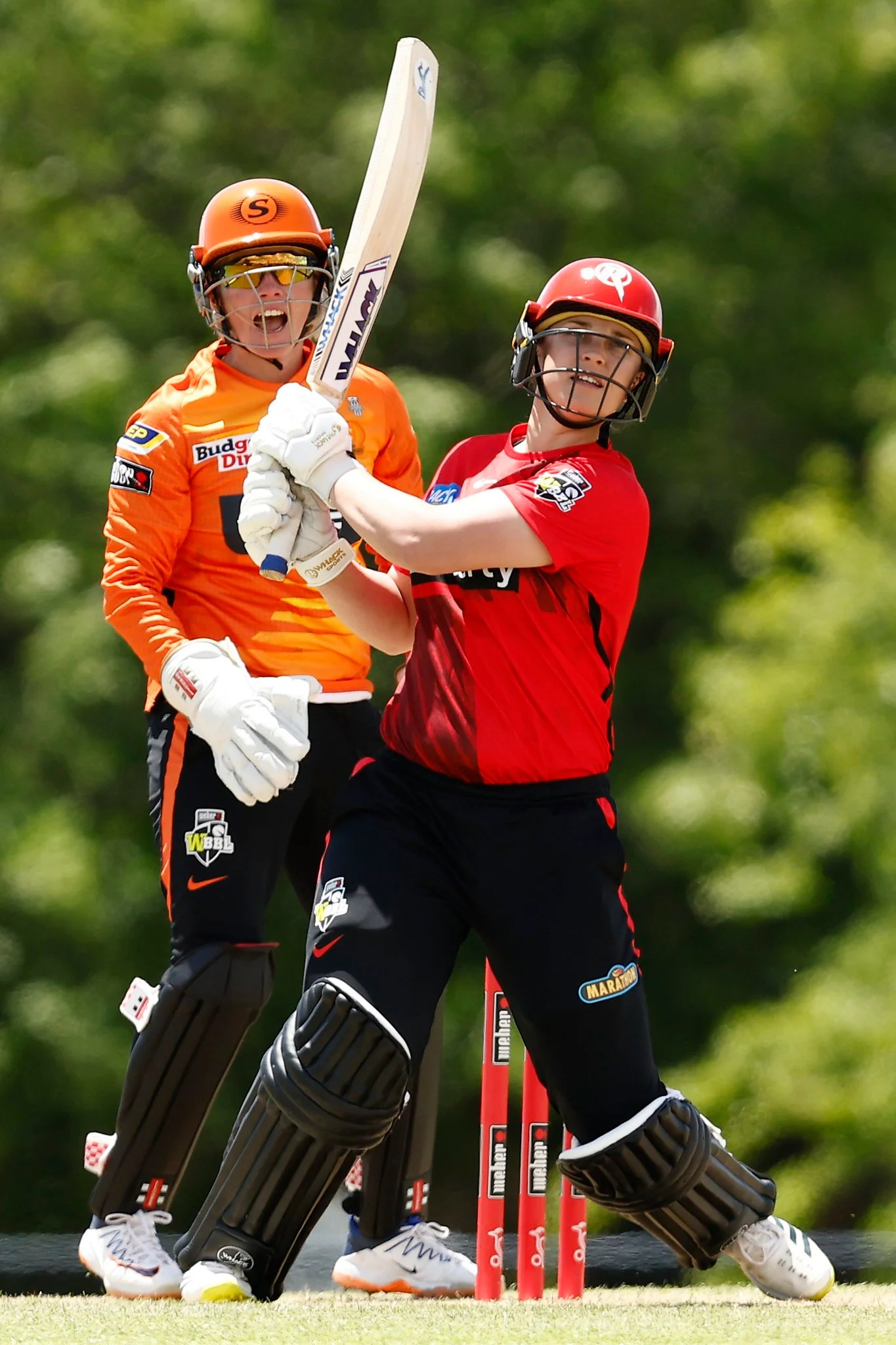
Erica Kershaw scores 34 off 18 to beat Perth Scorchers, eliminating them from the WBBL 08 Semi Finals.

Erica Kershaw (born 23 December 1991) is an Australian cricketer who plays as a wicket-keeper and left-handed batter. She has played for Victoria, Melbourne Renegades, ACT Meteors, Hobart Hurricanes. She made her maiden WNCL fifty on 24 September 2019, scoring 52 in ACT's three-wicket win over the South Australian Scorpions. In the final game for the Renegades she scored 34 off 18 to beat Perth Scorchers eliminating them from the WBBL 08 Semi Finals and earned herself Player of the Match.
