= Jess Duffin =

Australian sportswoman

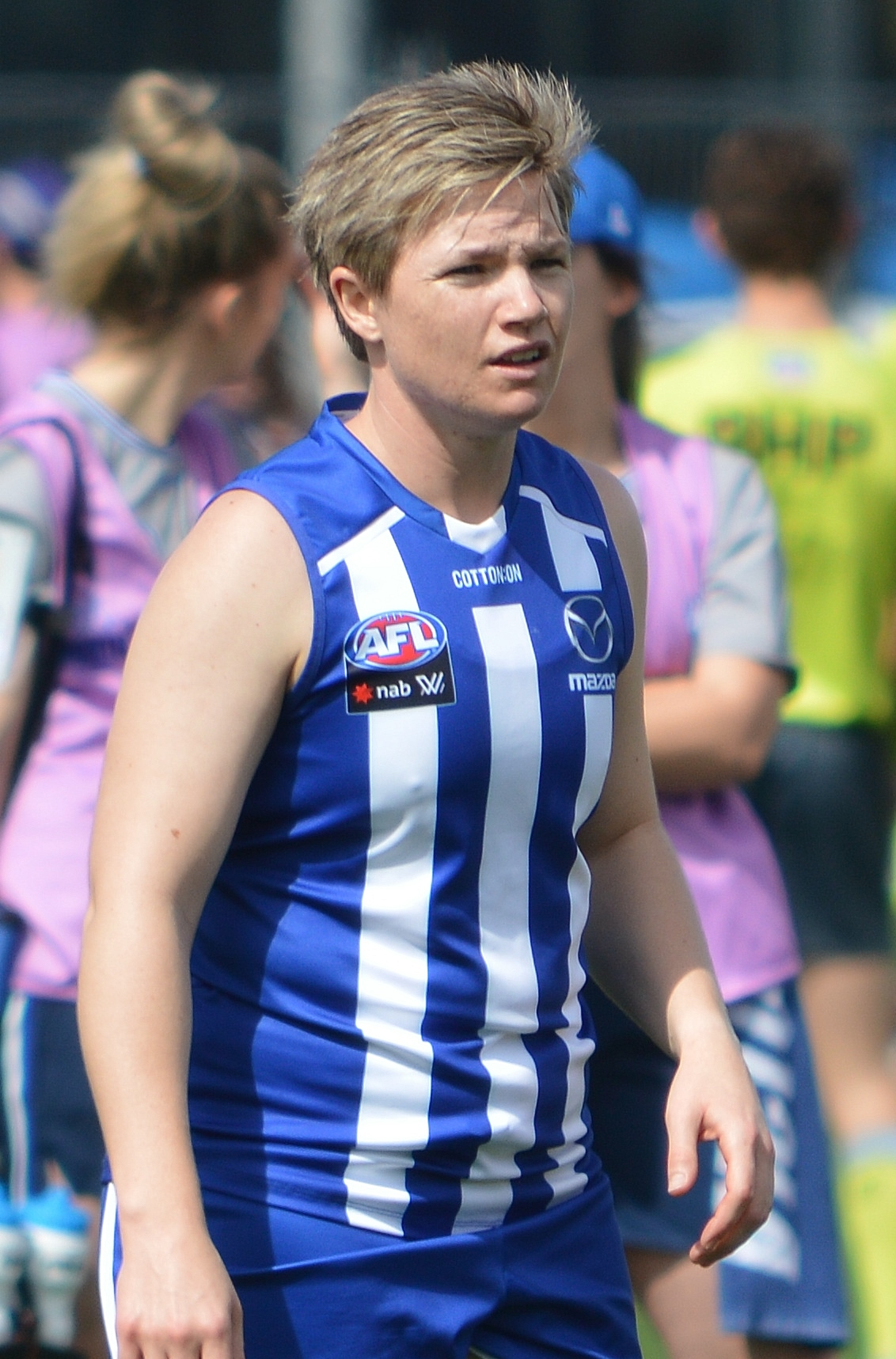
- Duffin playing Australian rules football for North Melbourne in 2021
- Born: Jessica Evelyn Cameron; 27 June 1989 (age 37); Williamstown, Victoria, Australia
- Other names: Soggy, Sog, Camo, Duff
- Height: 162 cm (5 ft 4 in)
Australian rules football career
Personal information
- Original team: Diamond Creek (VWFL)
- Draft: No. 75, 2016 AFL Women's draft
- Debut: Round 1, 2017, Collingwood vs. Carlton, at IKON Park
- Position: Utility
Playing career^{1}
Years	Club	Games (Goals)
2017–2018	Collingwood	13 (7)
2019–2022 (S6)	North Melbourne	19 (1)
2022 (S7)	Hawthorn	10 (7)
Total		42 (15)
- ^{1} Playing statistics correct to the end of 2022 season 7.
Career highlights
- AFL Women's All-Australian team: 2019; Hawthorn leading goalkicker: 2022 (S7)
- Cricket career

Cricket information
- Batting: Right-handed
- Bowling: Right-arm leg spin
- Role: Batter, occasional wicket-keeper

International information
- National side: Australia
- Test debut (cap 159): 22 January 2011 v England
- Last Test: 10 January 2014 v England
- ODI debut (cap 113): 1 February 2009 v New Zealand
- Last ODI: 27 July 2015 v England
- ODI shirt no.: 27
- T20I debut (cap 23): 15 February 2009 v New Zealand
- Last T20I: 31 August 2015 v England
- T20I shirt no.: 27

Domestic team information
- Years: Team
- 2006/07–2014/15: Victoria
- 2015/16: Western Australia
- 2016/17: Victoria
- 2016/17: Melbourne Stars
- 2017/18–2023/24: Melbourne Renegades
- 2018/19: Queensland

Career statistics
Competition	WTest	ODI	T20I	LA
Matches	3	50	64	137
Runs scored	109	1,265	941	2,943
Batting average	21.80	37.20	20.91	27.50
100s/50s	0/1	0/9	0/3	2/15
Top score	50	90*	68*	128
Balls bowled	–	18	–	317
Wickets	–	1	–	13
Bowling average	–	16.00	–	17.23
5 wickets in innings	–	0	–	1
10 wickets in match	–	0	–	0
Best bowling	–	1/16	–	6/28
Catches/stumpings	5/–	32/0	34/0	72/–
- Source: CricketArchive, 6 August 2025

Jessica Evelyn Duffin (née Cameron; born 27 June 1989) is an Australian sportswoman. In cricket, she has made 117 international appearances and won four world championships as a member of the Australian women's team. A right-handed batter with a reputation as a big game performer, Duffin was named Player of the Final in both the 2012 ICC Women's World Twenty20 and 2013 Women's Cricket World Cup tournaments. She also won the 2013 Belinda Clark Award for being adjudged Australia's best international women's cricketer over the previous year. Her domestic career has included playing for Victoria in the Women's National Cricket League and captaining the Melbourne Renegades in the Women's Big Bash League.

In addition to cricket, Duffin has played Australian rules football for Collingwood, North Melbourne, and Hawthorn in the AFL Women's competition. She led the league for marks across the first three seasons and earned selection in the 2019 All-Australian team as a half-back flanker. She has also received recognition for her outstanding performance at state league level, winning the 2018 Lambert–Pearce Medal while playing as a midfielder for Williamstown in the VFL Women's competition.

== Early life ==
Born in the Melbourne suburb of Williamstown, Duffin has described her childhood as "really sporty" and that "growing up with an older brother and my Dad meant I was in the backyard a lot... pretty much playing AFL and cricket from the age of four". Duffin participated in Auskick and then played football with Werribee until the age of twelve, after which girls were not permitted to compete.

The lack of female pathways in football at the time led Duffin to undertake the more accessible sport of cricket. After receiving encouragement by a school teacher, she attended an under-12 cricket training camp that resulted in selection for Victoria at junior level.

== International cricket ==
=== One Day and Twenty20 Debut ===
During the 2006–07 Australian summer, Duffin was selected for the national youth team to play against New Zealand A, where she had more success as a leg spinner than as a batter. In the final match of the series, she took 6/28 in a 22-run defeat. At the start of the 2008–09 season, Duffin played for an under-21 Australian team in a series against India. She made 60 of the team's 149 all out total in the second-last match, then delivered an unbeaten 79 in the team's winning score of 5/156.

On 1 February 2009, Duffin made her international cricket debut, playing an ODI against New Zealand at Cobham Oval. Coming in at seven in the batting order, she made 16 from 35 balls in a two-wicket loss. On 15 February, Duffin made her T20 International debut at the Sydney Cricket Ground, also against New Zealand. She was not required to bat or bowl in a rain-shortened match that Australia won by nine wickets.

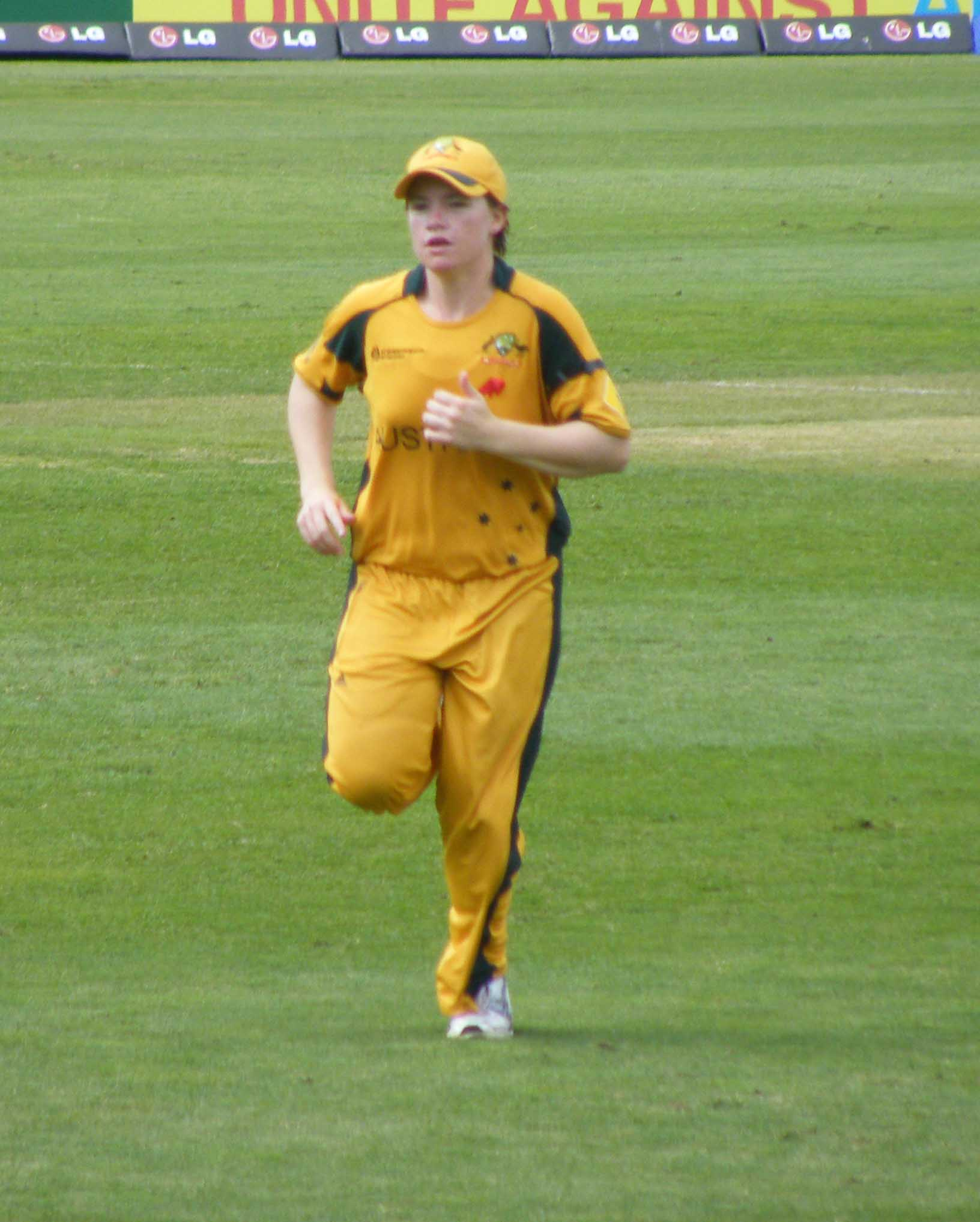
Duffin during the 2009 Women's Cricket World Cup

Duffin was selected in Australia's squad for the 2009 Women's Cricket World Cup on home soil. She played six of a possible seven matches and scored 81 runs at an average of 16.20, with the hosts finishing in fourth place. Duffin was then selected for the 2009 World Twenty20 in England. She only played one game and Australia were eliminated in the semi-finals.

=== Solidifying position, makeshift wicket-keeper ===
In the middle of the 2009–10 season, Duffin played for the Australian Under-21s against the New Zealand Emerging XI. She compiled 128 runs at 42.66 in five matches, with a best score of 66 in the fourth fixture.

After returning to the senior Australian team toward the end of the season, Duffin was selected as a wicket-keeper for three ODI matches in New Zealand. She top-scored with 68 off 81 balls in the first match of the series, helping the tourists to recover from a middle-order collapse and scrape home with a two-wicket win on the final ball. She was not required to bat in the last two matches and finished the series with four dismissals behind the stumps. This experiment was only repeated once more, with Duffin going on to settle as a top-order batter for the team.

=== 2010 World Twenty20 triumph ===
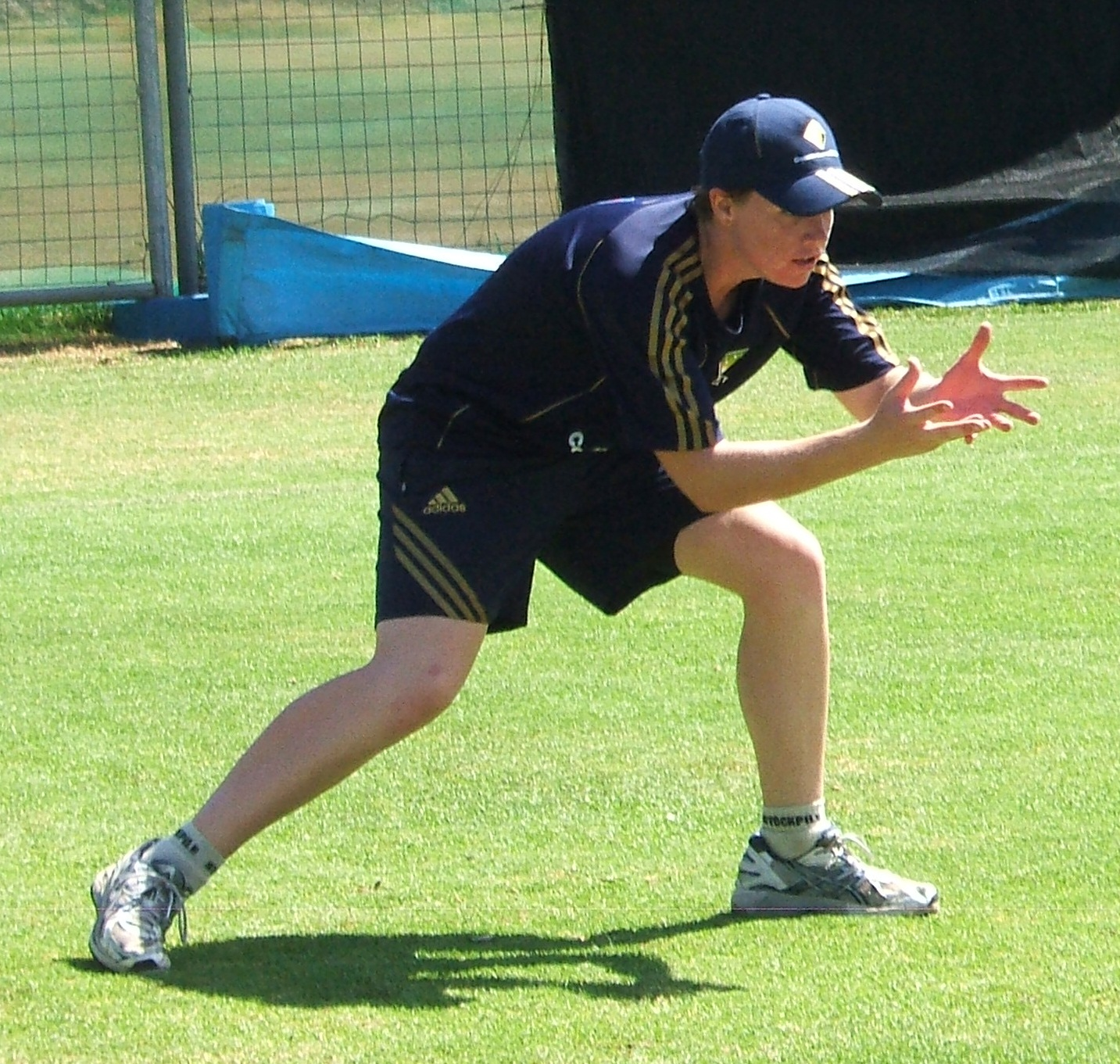
Duffin catching a ball at a practice session

Duffin was selected for the 2010 World Twenty20 in the West Indies, playing every game of Australia's unbeaten run.

In the first match against England, both teams finished their respective innings with a score of 104. The deadlock could not be broken in the resulting super over, with the match having to be decided by a count back on the number of sixes scored. The only six of the game had been hit by Duffin which ultimately secured victory for Australia.

In a low-scoring final against New Zealand, Duffin put on a 30-run partnership with Leah Poulton to help Australia win by three runs and claim their maiden World Twenty20 championship.

=== Test debut and second-straight World Twenty20 title ===
On 22 January 2011, Duffin made her Test cricket debut at Bankstown Oval against England. She scored 30 runs from 71 balls in the second innings of the match and Australia went on to win by seven wickets.

In an ODI against India on 16 March 2012 at Wankhede Stadium, Duffin recorded her highest score at international level, making 90 not out off 87 balls which steered Australia to a five-wicket win.

At the 2012 World Twenty20 in Sri Lanka, Duffin was the tournament's second-highest run-scorer. In a group stage encounter with Pakistan, she was named Player of the Match for her innings of 42 off 28 in a 35-run win (via the Duckworth–Lewis method). In the championship decider against England, Duffin scored 45 off 34 to help the team post a first innings score of 4/142. She was named Player of the Final in a four-run victory as Australia claimed their second-consecutive title.

=== 2013 Cricket World Cup ===
At the 2013 Cricket World Cup in India, Duffin put on a 182-run stand with Meg Lanning during a group stage match against New Zealand. Her innings of 82 off 87 helped Australia chase down a target of 228 with seven wickets and 70 balls remaining. In the final against the West Indies, Duffin scored 75 off 76 in a first innings total of 7/259. She was named Player of the Match while Australia won by 114 runs to earn their sixth 50-over World Cup.

On 11 August 2013, Duffin recorded her maiden Test half-century during a drawn Women's Ashes match at the Sir Paul Getty's Ground. She was dismissed without scoring another run in the first innings before making 24 in the third innings.

=== Third-consecutive World Twenty20 title ===
Duffin's best performance at the 2014 World Twenty20, held in Bangladesh, came against South Africa when she scored 27 not out off 24 deliveries and put on an unbeaten 60-run stand with Ellyse Perry. Coming together with Australia in trouble at 4/56 in the twelfth over, the pair turned the match around to guide their team over the line with eight balls to spare.

In the final against England, Duffin (despite not facing a ball) and Perry were once again the batters at the crease when the winning runs were scored. Australia sealed victory with six wickets and 29 balls remaining to win their third-straight World T20 title.

=== Break and potential comeback ===
In June 2015, Duffin was selected in Australia's touring party for the successful 2015 Women's Ashes campaign in England. Her most notable contribution of the series came in a T20I at the County Ground in Hove when she scored 21 not out to help secure a 20-run victory which regained the Ashes for Australia. It was, as of June 2020, her last international cricket tour. In October 2015, Duffin announced she would be taking an indefinite break from pursuing her international career.

In December 2019, during and after an outstanding WBBL|05 season, media speculation mounted around Duffin's potential recall to the national team ahead of the 2020 Women's T20 World Cup. However, she declined to participate in an upcoming Australia A series against India A, which some outlets interpreted to mean she had chosen to prioritise her AFL Women's career. In actuality, she had decided to prioritise starting a family with her husband Chris, announcing on 31 December she would halt her dual-sporting commitments to give birth to the couple's first child.

== Domestic cricket ==
=== Women's National Cricket League ===
At the age of 17, Duffin made her senior debut for Victoria in the Women's National Cricket League (WNCL) and played all eleven of the team's games for the 2006–07 season. In her first match, against reigning champions New South Wales, she contributed twelve runs with the bat in a three-wicket loss. She scored her maiden half-century on 19 January 2009, making 58 off 63 in a three-wicket loss to New South Wales.

On 24 November 2012, Duffin recorded her first WNCL century, scoring 128 off just 68 deliveries against South Australia. She put on a 195-run stand with Elyse Villani to help Victoria post a total of 3/418 and win by 199 runs. Ahead of the 2015–16 summer, Duffin moved interstate to play for the Western Fury. During the season, in which she only managed 118 runs at an average of 23.60, Cricket Australia stated Duffin would be taking an indefinite break from her domestic cricket commitments at the completion of the tournament.

In May 2016, Duffin confirmed her return to WNCL cricket, re-joining Victoria. On 29 October 2016, she recorded her second century at the level, making 108 off 120 and forming a partnership of 288 runs with Meg Lanning in a 157-run victory against Tasmania. Duffin was not contracted for the following season and, in May 2018, she signed with Queensland for the 2018–19 competition. In May 2019, Duffin reportedly opted against signing with a WNCL team to focus on her AFL Women's career.

=== Women's Big Bash League ===
At the official Women's Big Bash League (WBBL) launch on 10 July 2015, Duffin was unveiled as the first-ever player signing for the Perth Scorchers. However, beginning in November 2015, Duffin stepped away from her domestic cricket commitments which would lead to missing the whole inaugural WBBL season.

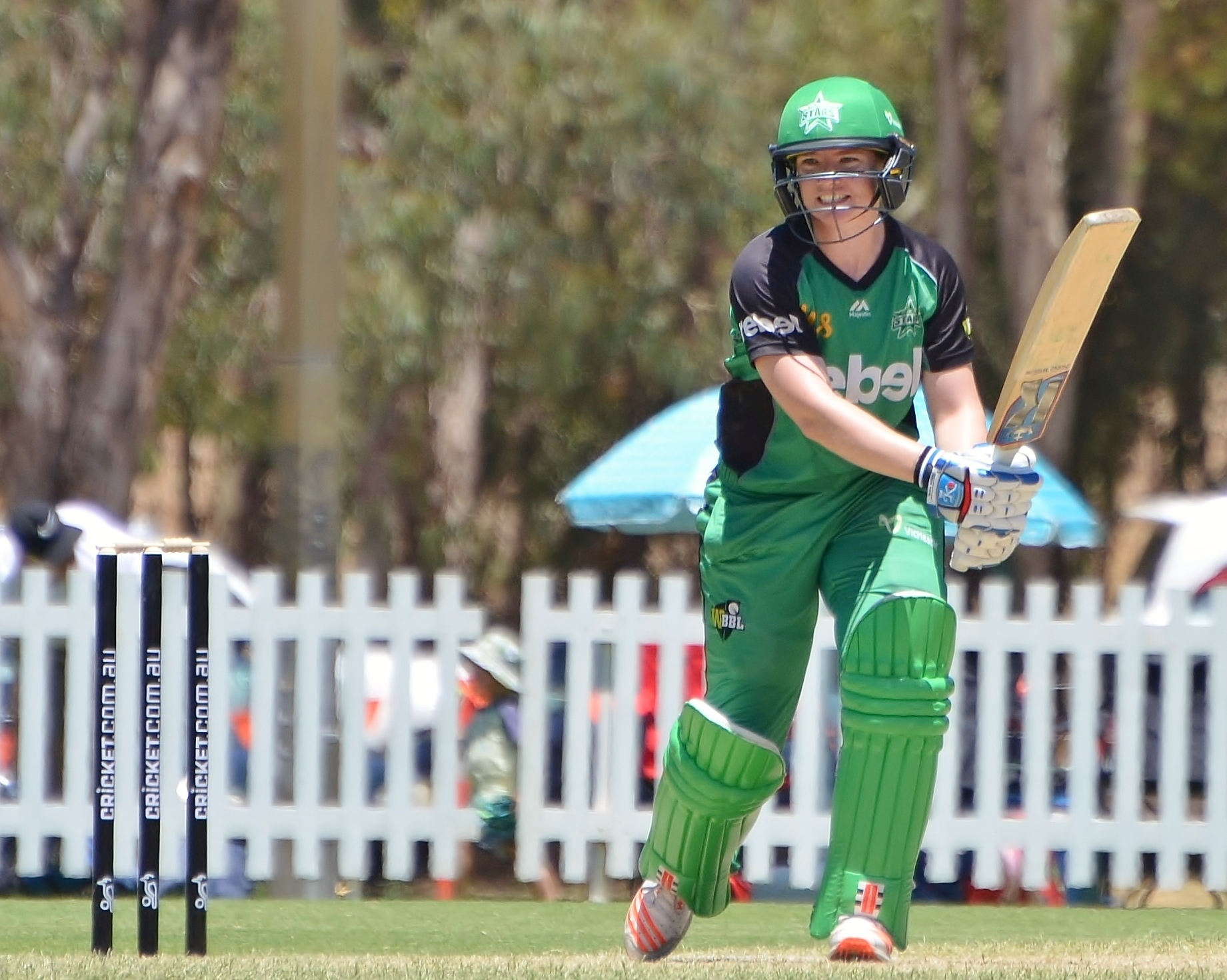
Duffin batting for Melbourne Stars during WBBL-02

In June 2016, a month after Duffin signalled a return to top-level domestic cricket, the Melbourne Stars announced they had "won the race for the prized signature of the former Australian batter" by recruiting her for the WBBL|02 season.

On 20 January 2017, in a match against the Hobart Hurricanes at Bellerive Oval, Duffin pulled off arguably the most unlikely victory of her career. Facing Amy Satterthwaite and needing 12 runs from the last two legal deliveries, Duffin hit a six off the first ball. Then, she hit a four off what was deemed a no-ball. With Satterthwaite having to bowl an additional delivery, Duffin worked a single through the leg side to claim a last-gasp six-wicket win.

In September 2017, Duffin switched to the Stars' crosstown rival, signing with the Melbourne Renegades ahead of WBBL|03. In the first game of the season, on 9 December 2017 against the Sydney Thunder at North Sydney Oval, she recorded her highest WBBL score with an innings of 81 off 47 and was named Player of the Match. Requiring 28 more runs with 17 balls remaining, Duffin was dismissed in controversial fashion by what commentators and players believed to be an illegitimate catch. The momentum of the contest then swung dramatically and the Renegades lost by eleven runs.

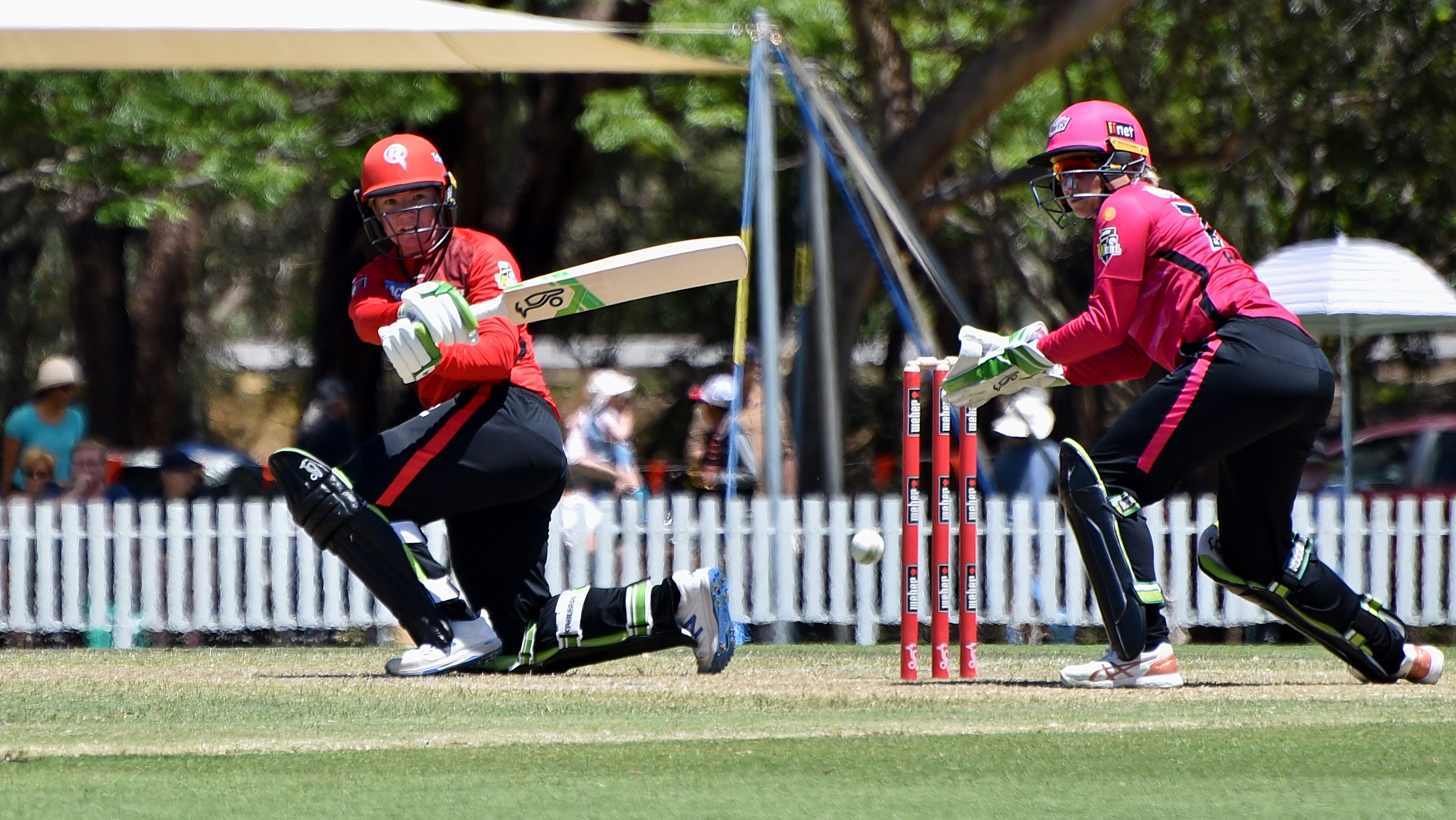
Duffin batting for Melbourne Renegades during WBBL-07

In September 2019, the Renegades announced Duffin as the team's captain for WBBL|05, replacing Amy Satterthwaite who would sit out 2019–20 due to pregnancy. Coincidentally, Duffin would miss one game during the season, the cause of which was later revealed to be a case of morning sickness. Nevertheless, she had a stellar tournament, scoring 544 runs at an average of 68.00 and a strike rate of 138.77. Among her highlights was an unbeaten 27-ball innings of 50 runs on 27 November 2019 against the Brisbane Heat, helping the Renegades mow down a target of 184 and set a new league record for the highest successful chase. Although the Renegades would be eliminated in the semi-finals for the second-straight year, Duffin received individual acclaim by being named captain for the Team of the Tournament.

Three months after giving birth to her first child, Duffin withdrew from the 2020–21 Women's Big Bash League season, saying her body was not yet ready for a return to the cricket field: "I've always prided myself on my preparation and there just hasn't been that opportunity this year."

== Australian rules football ==
=== State leagues ===
Even while a member of the Australian cricket team, Duffin occasionally played football with various clubs including Melbourne University, Wyndhamvale and St Kilda Sharks. In October 2015, she decided to take an indefinite break from cricket, later revealing this was partly prompted by her interest in the AFL's soon-to-be-launched women's football league: "I got wind of the AFLW coming in... that's when I had to consider playing football and not playing cricket for Australia." After playing with her sister at Port Melbourne Colts in Division 4 of the Victorian Women's Football League, Duffin accepted an invitation to join Premier Division VWFL team Diamond Creek. In April 2016, she kicked nine goals on debut for the club.

In 2018, Duffin signed with VFL Women's team Williamstown for the upcoming season. Although her club struggled and only won four of 14 games, she had a standout individual year and was adjudged the league's Best and Fairest player, winning the Lambert–Pearce Medal.

=== AFL Women's ===
==== Exhibition matches ====
On 22 May 2016, Duffin kicked five goals for Melbourne during an exhibition match against Brisbane at the Melbourne Cricket Ground. On 3 September 2016, she played in another exhibition match for Melbourne—this time an All-Star clash against the Western Bulldogs at Whitten Oval, with the two teams made up of the best female players nation-wide.

==== 2017–2018 Collingwood ====
In October 2016, Duffin was selected by Collingwood with the 75th overall pick in the 2016 AFL Women's draft. On 3 February 2017, she made her debut in the opening match of the league's inaugural season, which resulted in a 35-point loss to Carlton at IKON Park. Primarily spending the year as a forward, Duffin kicked her first goal in round two against Melbourne. At the end of the season, she was named in the 2017 All-Australian squad.

Due to an adductor injury, Duffin had a delayed start to the 2018 AFLW season, playing her first game of the year in a 13-point round two loss to Fremantle at Optus Stadium. In round six, she recorded her first League B&F votes, picking up 18 disposals in a 14-point win against Brisbane at Moreton Bay Sports Complex and being adjudged second-best on ground. For the second time in a row, Collingwood finished the season strongly but only won three of seven games to place mid-ladder.

==== 2019–2022 (S6): North Melbourne ====
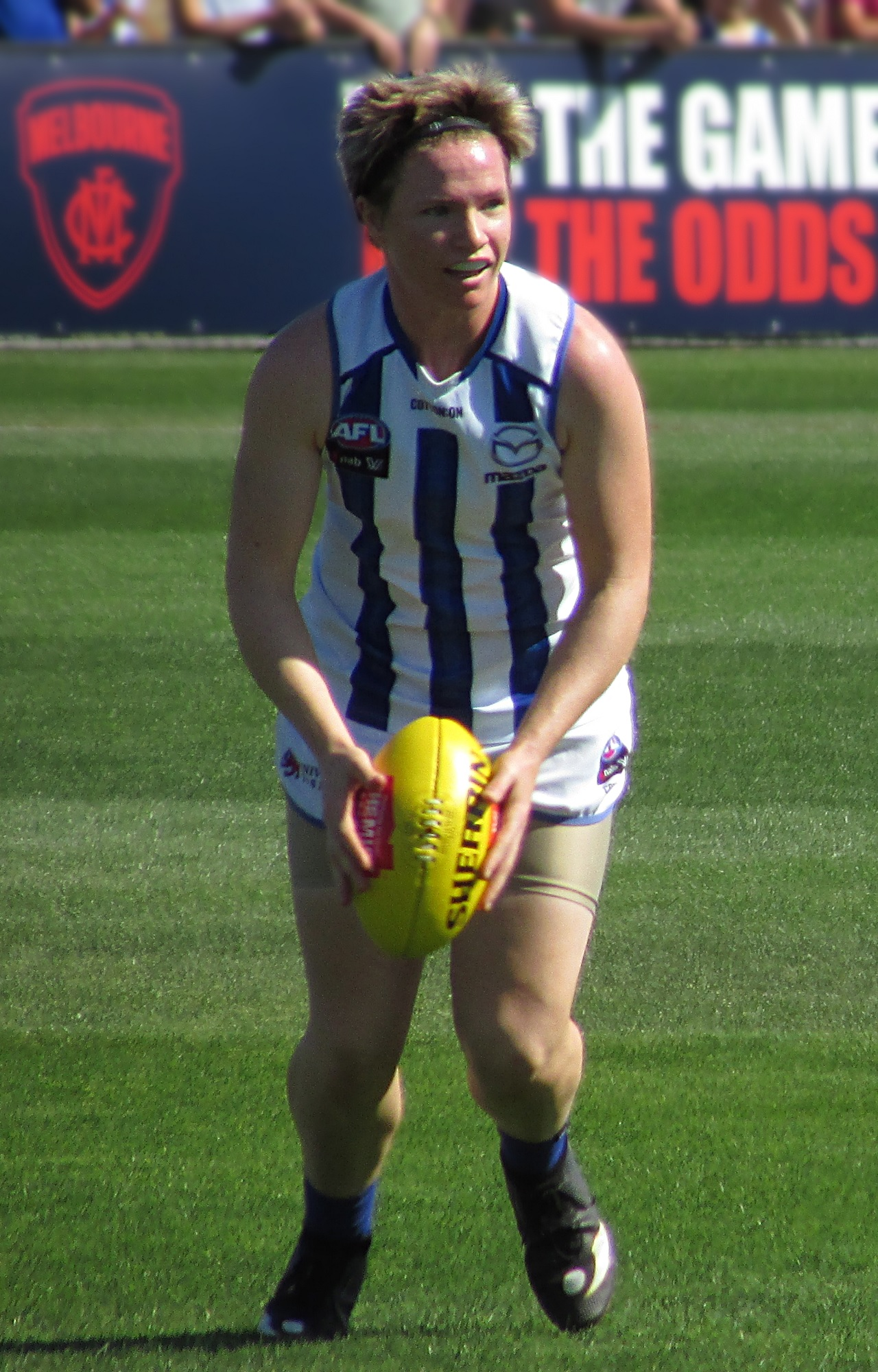
Duffin playing for North Melbourne in 2019

In May 2018, Duffin signed with expansion club North Melbourne as a free agent. She played across half-back throughout the 2019 AFLW season, managing three games of 20-plus disposals and leading the league in marks for the second time. Despite having the third-best record in the league, North Melbourne controversially failed to qualify for the four-team finals series due to the competition's conference structure. Duffin was nevertheless recognised for her dominant season, earning selection in the 2019 All-Australian team.

During the 2019 sign-and-trade period, Duffin was comparatively slow to negotiate a new contract. On 19 April, North Melbourne announced they had re-signed her for two more years. However, on 31 December, Duffin announced that she was pregnant with her first child being due in June, and would therefore sit out the 2020 AFLW season.

Following a 714-day absence, Duffin made her AFLW return in round five of the 2021 season, registering eleven disposals and five marks in a 22-point defeat of Carlton at UTAS Stadium.

It was revealed she signed on with the club for one more season on 17 June 2021, tying her to the club until the end of 2022 (S6).

==== 2022 (S7): Hawthorn ====
For 2022 season 7, Duffin joined Hawthorn. Hawthorn were one of four clubs to join the AFLW that season. After one season with the Hawks, she retired from football.

==== Statistics ====
Legend
G	Goals	K	Kicks	D	Disposals	T	Tackles
B	Behinds	H	Handballs	M	Marks
†	Led the league for the season

Season	Team	No.	Games	Totals							Averages (per game)							Votes
Season	Team	No.	Games	G	B	K	H	D	M	T	G	B	K	H	D	M	T	Votes
2017	Collingwood	27	7	6	3	45	12	57	27^{†}	17	0.9	0.4	6.4	1.7	8.1	3.9^{†}	2.4	0
2018	Collingwood	27	6	1	0	72	9	81	28	11	0.2	0.0	12.0	1.5	13.5	4.7^{†}	1.8	2
2019	North Melbourne	27	7	1	1	94	29	123	40^{†}	19	0.1	0.1	13.4	4.1	17.6	5.7^{†}	2.7	6
2020	North Melbourne	27	0	—	—	—	—	—	—	—	—	—	—	—	—	—	—	0
2021	North Melbourne	27	6	0	0	58	23	81	19	6	0.0	0.0	9.7	3.8	13.5	3.2	1.0	0
2022 (S6)	North Melbourne	27	6	0	0	43	16	59	20	7	0.0	0.0	7.2	2.7	9.8	3.3	1.2	0
2022 (S7)	Hawthorn	27	10	7	4	56	17	73	25	17	0.7	0.4	5.6	1.7	7.3	2.5	1.7	2
Career			42	15	8	368	106	474	159	77	0.4	0.2	8.8	2.5	11.3	3.8	1.8	10

== Personal life ==
Duffin studied at Kangan Institute to become a qualified spare parts interpreter. She combined her cricket commitments with a job at Werribee Automotive Group until embarking on a dual-sporting career in June 2016.

Known by her maiden name Jess Cameron throughout her international cricket career, in April 2017 she married longtime partner Chris Duffin. In December 2019, the couple announced they were expecting their first child together. Duffin gave birth to her first child in June 2020.

In addition to conventional nicknames such as "Duff" and "Camo", Duffin is often referred to as "Soggy" or "Sog" on account of one particular cricket training escapade in which she waded through a nearby flowing creek to retrieve a misdirected ball. Her own version of the story is "I bowled a ball over the nets when I was in under 12s and went in with socks and shoes still on and came out all Soggy."

== Honours ==
=== Cricket ===
==== Team ====
- Women's Cricket World Cup champion: 2013
- 3× ICC Women's World Twenty20 champion: 2010, 2012, 2014
- 3× Australian Women's Twenty20 Cup champion: 2009–10, 2010–11, 2011–12

==== Individual ====
- Women's Cricket World Cup Player of the Final: 2013
- ICC Women's World Twenty20 Player of the Final: 2012
- Belinda Clark Award winner: 2013
- Melbourne Renegades Player of the Season: 2019–20

=== Australian rules football ===
==== Individual ====
- AFL Women's All-Australian team: 2019
- Hawthorn leading goalkicker: 2022 (S7)
- Lambert–Pearce Medal winner: 2018
