= Courtney Webb =

Australian sportswoman

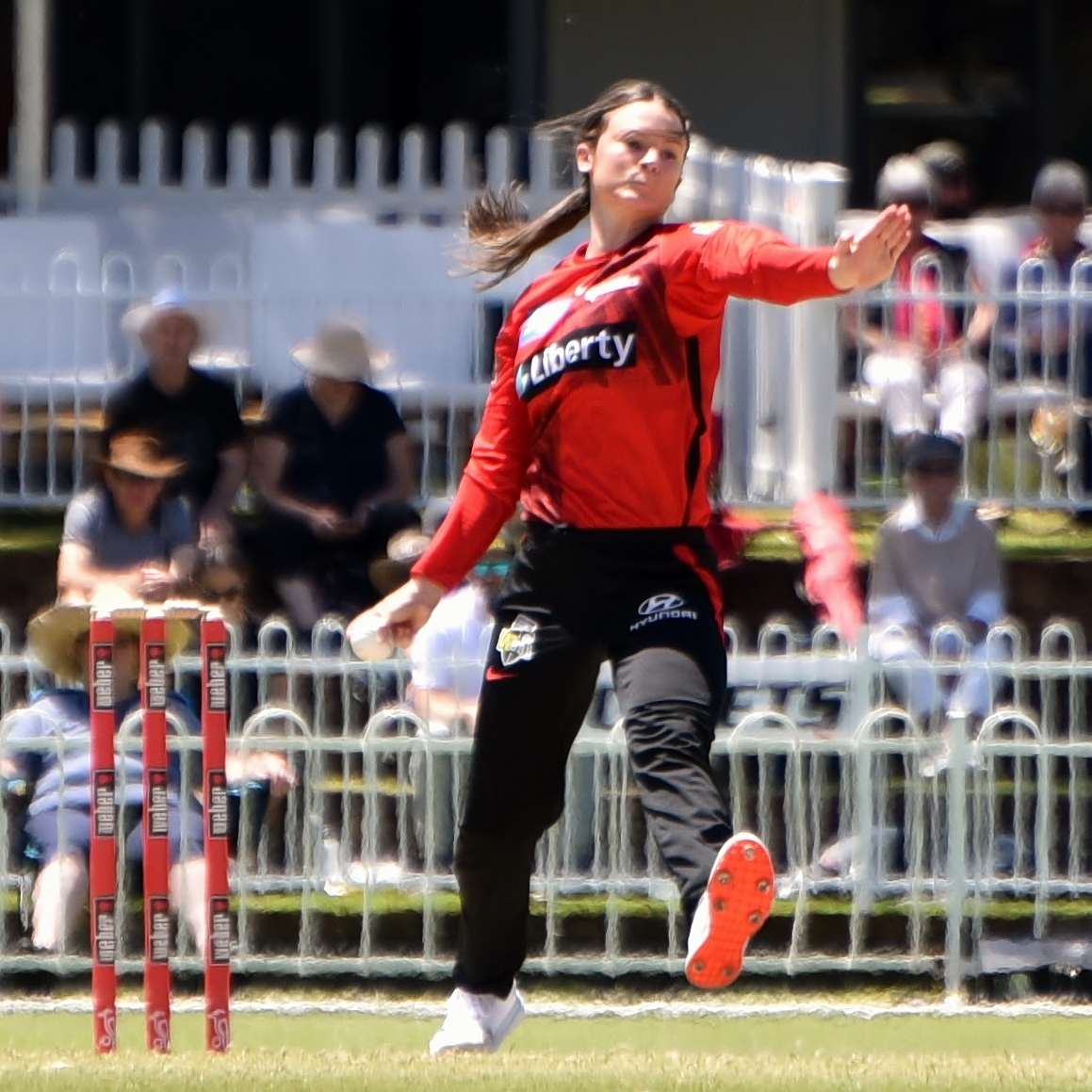
- Webb bowling for Melbourne Renegades during WBBL|07
- Born: Courtney Anne Webb; 30 November 1999 (age 26); Launceston, Tasmania, Australia
- Height: 163 cm (5 ft 4 in)
Australian rules football career
Personal information
- Original team: Launceston (TFL)
- Draft: No. 17, 2017 AFL Women's rookie draft
- Debut: Round 4, 2018, Carlton vs. Western Bulldogs, at VU Whitten Oval
- Position: Midfielder
Playing career^{1}
Years	Club	Games (Goals)
2018–2019	Carlton	2 (0)
- ^{1} Playing statistics correct to the end of the 2019 season.
- Cricket career

Cricket information
- Batting: Right-handed
- Bowling: Right-arm medium
- Role: Batter

Domestic team information
- Years: Team
- 2017/18–2019/20: Tasmania
- 2018/19–present: Melbourne Renegades
- 2020/21–present: South Australia (squad no. 17)
- 2024: Central Sparks

Career statistics
Competition	List A	Twenty20
Matches	78	111
Runs scored	2,586	1,861
Batting average	38.02	24.16
100s/50s	5/18	0/3
Top score	123*	61
Balls bowled	447	234
Wickets	10	11
Bowling average	42.00	29.09
5 wickets in innings	0	0
10 wickets in match	0	0
Best bowling	2/18	3/21
Catches/stumpings	20/–	19/–
- Source: CricketArchive, 5 October 2025

Courtney Anne Webb (born 30 November 1999) is a cricketer and Australian rules footballer from Launceston, Tasmania. A right-handed batter and right-arm medium-pace bowler, Webb currently plays for South Australia in the Women's National Cricket League (WNCL) and for the Melbourne Renegades in the Women's Big Bash League (WBBL).

== Cricket ==
Webb made her WNCL debut for Tasmania in the first match of the 2017–18 season, scoring four runs with the bat and finishing with bowling figures of 2/28 in a seven-wicket loss to Western Australia. Ahead of the 2020–21 season, she declined to re-sign with Tasmania and instead accepted an offer to play for South Australia.

In February 2018, Webb was selected in the under-19 national women's squad, set to tour South Africa during April. She was named vice-captain of the 50-over team which played in a tri-series against South Africa Emerging Women and the England Women's Academy.

=== Women's Big Bash League ===
Webb signed with the Melbourne Renegades ahead of WBBL|04. She debuted on 8 December 2018 at the Junction Oval in a six-wicket win against the Adelaide Strikers, though she was not required to bat. Her most significant contribution of the season came on 29 December at Docklands Stadium, when she scored 21 not out and helped the Renegades narrowly defeat the Melbourne Stars with one ball to spare. It was just the second one-wicket victory in the league's history.

The Renegades re-signed Webb ahead of WBBL|05. She delivered a breakout performance on 17 November 2019 against the Sydney Sixers at Drummoyne Oval by scoring 34 not out, hitting a six off the final ball to clinch a two-wicket victory and earning Player of the Match honours.

Although her team struggled throughout WBBL|06, Webb was again recognised as one of the league's rising stars—an unbeaten innings of 54 runs from 33 balls at Sydney Showground Stadium on 15 November 2020 helped secure a super over victory against the previously undefeated Melbourne Stars, earning her a second nomination for the Young Gun award. Webb's ability in the field also garnered attention, particularly after claiming a spectacular diving catch at North Sydney Oval against the Sydney Sixers which was praised by commentators as one of the best of the tournament. Capping off a strong campaign, she was named the Renegades' Player of the Season.

In June 2021, Webb re-signed with the Renegades for another two seasons.

== Football ==
Webb played two matches for Carlton in the AFL Women's (AFLW) competition. After being passed over in the 2017 national draft, Webb was ultimately drafted by Carlton with their third selection and the 17th overall pick in the rookie draft. She made her debut during round four of the 2018 season in a 73-point loss to the Western Bulldogs at VU Whitten Oval.

In April 2019, Webb was delisted by Carlton. Despite injuries and the struggle to balance two sports, it was reported she would continue to play football at local level for Launceston and hadn't ruled out attempting to return to AFLW in the future.
