= Georgia Wareham =

Australian cricketer

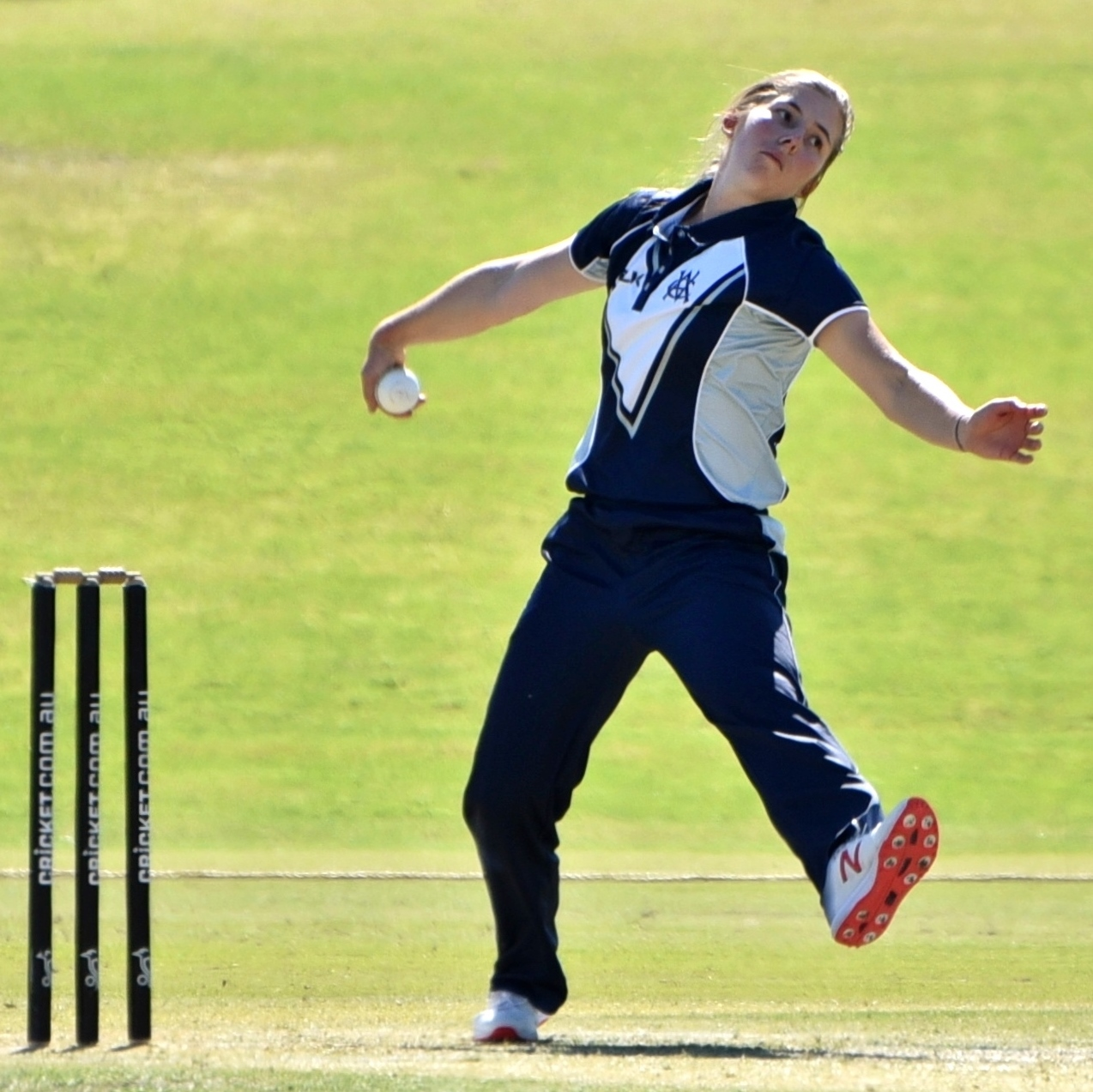
- Wareham bowling for Victoria, 2018

Personal information
- Born: 26 May 1999 (age 27); Terang, Victoria, Australia
- Nickname: Wolfie
- Batting: Right-handed
- Bowling: Right-arm leg break
- Role: Allrounder

International information
- National side: Australia (2018–present)
- Only Test (cap 180): 30 September 2021 v India
- ODI debut (cap 139): 18 October 2018 v Pakistan
- Last ODI: 17 January 2025 v England
- T20I debut (cap 50): 29 September 2018 v New Zealand
- Last T20I: 26 March 2025 v New Zealand
- T20I shirt no.: 35

Domestic team information
- Years: Team
- 2015/16–present: Melbourne Renegades
- 2017/18–present: Victoria
- 2023: Gujarat Giants
- 2023–present: Northern Superchargers
- 2024–2025: Royal Challengers Bengaluru
- 2026–present: Gujarat Giants

Career statistics
Competition	WTest	WODI	WT20I
Matches	1	42	66
Runs scored	2	234	261
Batting average	2.00	33.42	16.31
100s/50s	0/0	0/0	0/1
Top score	2	37*	57
Balls bowled	66	1,654	1,084
Wickets	1	45	69
Bowling average	40.00	26.24	15.97
5 wickets in innings	0	0	0
10 wickets in match	0	0	0
Best bowling	1/40	3/23	3/11
Catches/stumpings	0/–	16/–	26/–
Medal record
Women's Cricket
Representing Australia
T20 World Cup
Winner	2026 England & Wales
- Source: ESPNcricinfo, 25 January 2025

Georgia Wareham (born 26 May 1999) is an Australian cricketer who plays for the Australia women's national team as a leg spin bowler. At the domestic level, she plays for Victoria and the Melbourne Renegades. In April 2018, she played six matches on an Under-19 tour of South Africa, taking a total of nine wickets including 4/17 in a 50-over match against the Emerging South Africa team.

== Career ==
In September 2018, she was named in Australia's squad for the Women's Twenty20 International (WT20I) series against New Zealand. She made her WT20I debut for Australia against New Zealand on 29 September 2018.

In October 2018, she was named in Australia's squad for the 2018 ICC Women's World Twenty20 tournament in the West Indies. She made her Women's One Day International cricket (WODI) debut for Australia Women against Pakistan Women on 18 October 2018.

In November 2018, she was named in the Melbourne Renegades' squad for the 2018–19 Women's Big Bash League season. The International Cricket Council (ICC) named Wareham as one of the five breakout stars in women's cricket in 2018.

In April 2019, Cricket Australia awarded her with her first full contract ahead of the 2019–20 season. In June 2019, Cricket Australia named her in Australia's team for their tour to England to contest the Women's Ashes. In January 2020, she was named in Australia's squad for the 2020 ICC Women's T20 World Cup in Australia.

In August 2021, Wareham was named in Australia's squad for their series against India, which included a one-off day/night Test match as part of the tour. Wareham made her Test debut on 30 September 2021, for Australia against India.

In October 2021, she suffered a rupture of her left anterior cruciate ligament while fielding in a WBBL match, a recurrence of an injury she had experienced playing Australian rules football as a 14-year-old. After two surgeries and a 14-month recovery period, she resumed playing competitive cricket in January 2023.

She was named in the Australia squad for the 2024 ICC Women's T20 World Cup and the 2025 Women's Ashes series.

=== WPL ===
In the inaugural 2023 season of WPL, Georgia Wareham was bought by Gujarat Giants for ₹75L. She was signed by Royal Challengers Bangalore ahead of the 2024 season for ₹40L. In the auction held in November 2025 for the 2026 season of WPL, Wareham was bought back by the Gujarat Giants for ₹1CR.
