= Sophie Molineux =

Australian cricketer (born 1998)

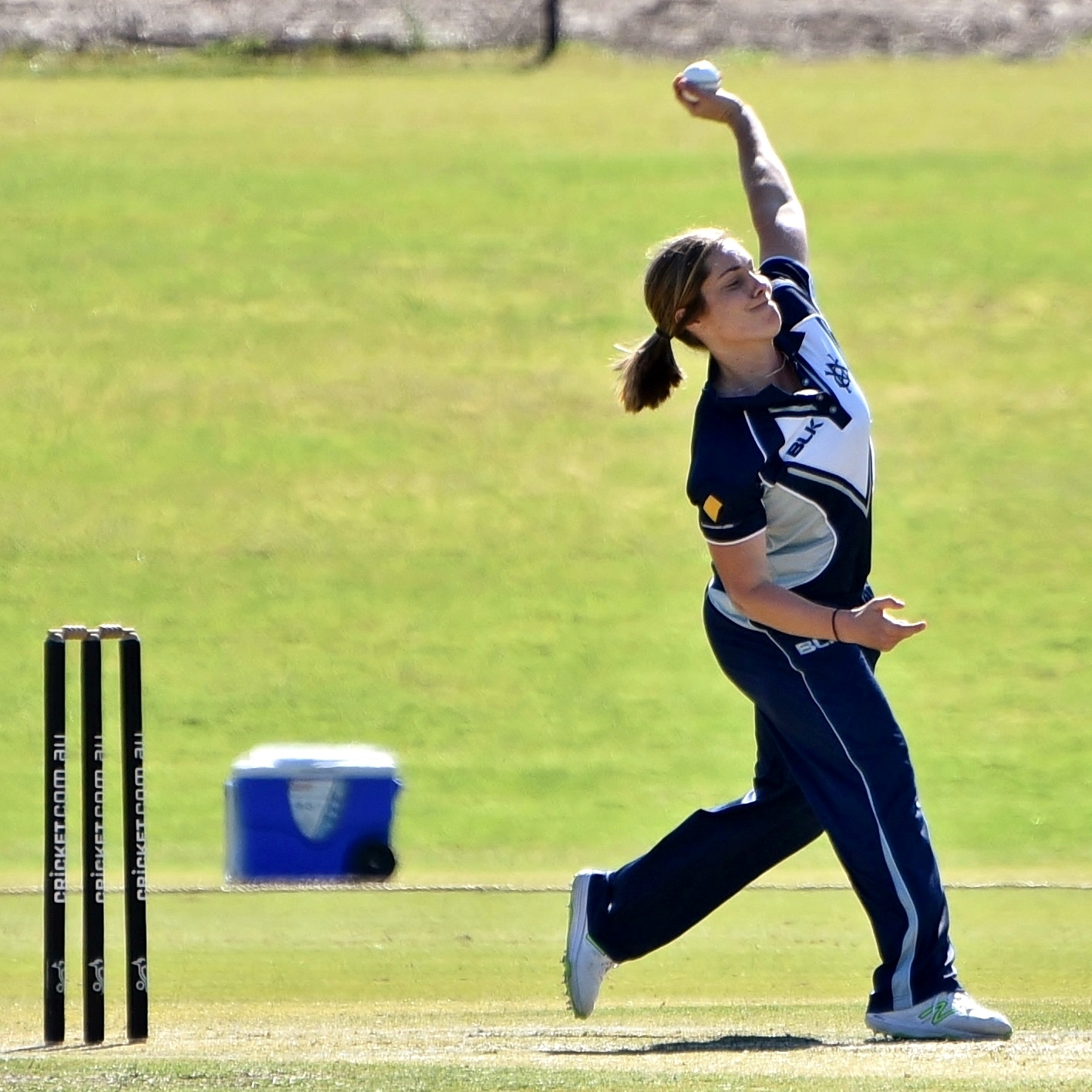
- Molineux bowling for Victoria

Personal information
- Full name: Sophie Grace Molineux
- Born: 17 January 1998 (age 28); Bairnsdale, Victoria, Australia
- Batting: Left-handed
- Bowling: Left-arm orthodox spin
- Role: Bowler

International information
- National side: Australia (2018–present)
- Test debut (cap 175): 18 July 2019 v England
- Last Test: 15 February 2024 v South Africa
- ODI debut (cap 138): 18 October 2018 v Pakistan
- Last ODI: 27 March 2024 v Bangladesh
- T20I debut (cap 48): 22 March 2018 v India
- Last T20I: 17 October 2024 v South Africa
- T20I shirt no.: 23

Domestic team information
- Years: Team
- 2015/16–present: Melbourne Renegades (squad no. 23)
- 2016/17–present: Victoria
- 2022: Birmingham Phoenix
- 2023/24: Canterbury
- 2024: Royal Challengers Bangalore

Career statistics
Competition	WTest	WODI	WT20I
Matches	3	11	38
Runs scored	97	62	58
Batting average	24.25	12.40	6.44
100s/50s	0/0	0/0	0/0
Top score	41	26	18
Balls bowled	462	537	795
Wickets	7	22	41
Bowling average	24.85	11.77	18.68
5 wickets in innings	0	0	0
10 wickets in match	0	0	0
Best bowling	4/95	4/14	4/16
Catches/stumpings	2/–	8/–	16/–
Medal record
Women's Cricket
Representing Australia
T20 World Cup
Winner	2026 England & Wales
- Source: ESPNCricinfo, 15 October 2024

Sophie Grace Molineux (born 17 January 1998) is an Australian cricketer. A left-arm orthodox bowling all-rounder, Molineux has been a member of the national women's team since 2018. At domestic level, she currently plays for Victoria in the Women's National Cricket League (WNCL) and captains the Melbourne Renegades in the Women's Big Bash League (WBBL). On 29 January 2026, Molineux was appointed Captain of the Australian Women's national cricket team across all formats (Test, ODI, and T20). Molineux has also represented WPL side Royal Challengers Bangalore.

== Early life and education ==
Born in the eastern-Victorian town of Bairnsdale, Molineux has been involved in cricket since early childhood, sharing a passion for the game with her father Mark. At age ten, she was talent-spotted by former Australian coach John Harmer, who was soon thereafter engaged as her private mentor. She achieved numerous feats in her junior years, such as taking a hat-trick while playing for Gippsland during the 2013–14 Under-18 state championship, and successfully captaining Victoria at the 2015–16 Under-18 national championships. Molineux went on to join Victorian Premier Cricket club Dandenong and scored her maiden First XI century in October 2015. She completed high school in 2016, graduating from Nagle College.

== Domestic career ==
=== Women's National Cricket League ===
Molineux debuted for Victoria in the WNCL on 15 October 2016 against the ACT Meteors at the WACA, bowling ten overs with figures of 0/34 during a nine-wicket win. In her second match, against the Western Fury, she dismissed Heather Graham for her first WNCL scalp and finished with figures of 3/41 as Victoria went on to win by seven wickets. A month later, she top-scored for her team with an innings of 55 from 90 balls, marking her first half-century, in a 29-run loss against the Queensland Fire at Casey Fields. Molineux finished her strong maiden domestic season with a total of seven wickets at an average of 20.71 and was recognised at the 2017 Allan Border Medal ceremony by winning the inaugural Betty Wilson Young Cricketer of the Year Award.

On 21 January 2020, Molineux delivered her first Player of the Match performance, taking 3/33 with the ball and scoring 80 runs with the bat in a five-wicket win against Tasmania at the TCA Ground.

=== Women's Big Bash League ===
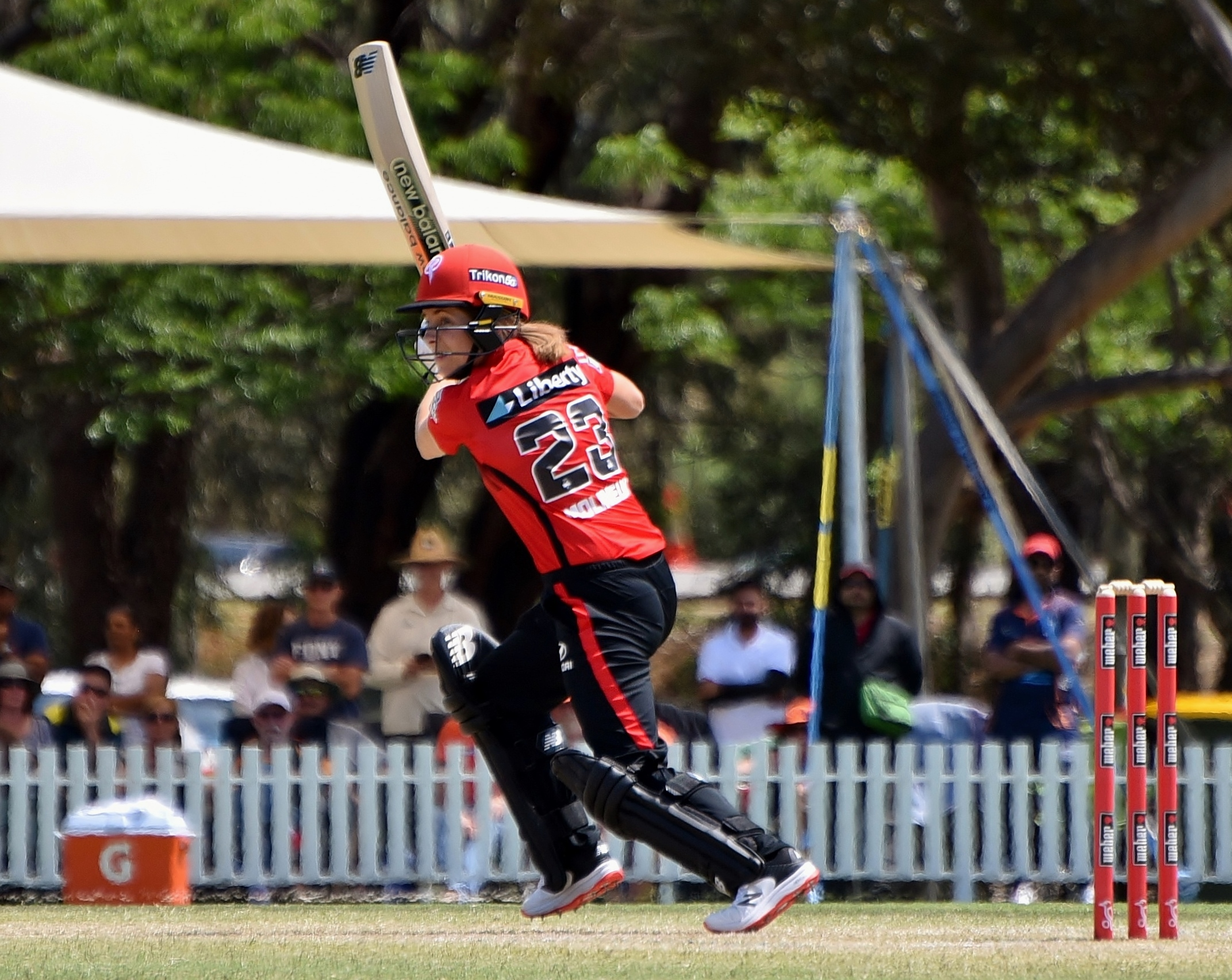
Molineux batting for Melbourne Renegades during WBBL|07

Molineux made her women's Twenty20 debut for the Melbourne Renegades during the inaugural WBBL season in 2015–16. She took her first wicket against the Sydney Thunder at Allan Border Field, dismissing Nicola Carey for 13.

On the opening weekend of the following season at North Sydney Oval, Molineux claimed figures of 4/18 and scored 28 not out in her first Player of the Match performance, with the Renegades defeating the Adelaide Strikers by seven wickets.

Molineux won the league's Young Gun Award for WBBL|03, scoring 318 runs at an average of 26.50 and taking six wickets at an economy rate of 6.39 across the season.

Named the Renegades' Most Valuable Player of WBBL|04, Molineux scored 354 runs and took 16 wickets during the tournament to help her team reach the finals for the first time. She was at the centre of a "thrilling" semi-final encounter with the Sydney Sixers at Drummoyne Oval, scoring 55 from 54 balls to "brilliantly take the chase into the final over". Facing Ellyse Perry and needing three runs for victory from the last delivery, Molineux struck the ball to the deep point boundary but was short of her ground while attempting the match-winning run, foiled by a "miracle" team fielding effort from the Sixers. With scores consequently tied, the game was forced into a super over, which ultimately resulted in a "heartbreaking loss" for the Renegades.

Midway through WBBL|05, Molineux requested time away from cricket to focus on her mental health and wellbeing. Ahead of WBBL|06, she re-signed with the Renegades for a further two seasons. On 10 June 2021, Molineux was appointed captain of the Renegades for WBBL|07, replacing Amy Satterthwaite and becoming the youngest player in the team's history to take on the role.

=== The Hundred ===
In April 2022, she was bought by the Birmingham Phoenix for the 2022 season of The Hundred in England.

== International career ==
=== 2016–17: Development teams ===
In January 2016, Molineux was chosen for the Governor-General's XI against the touring Indian women's team at Drummoyne Oval. In March 2016, she played for the Shooting Stars—a team of Australia's best emerging female players—against Sri Lankan and English development squads during a tri-nation series in Colombo. Her selection in the Governor-General's XI match continued for two more seasons, playing against the touring South Africa in November 2016 at Manuka Oval and the touring England in November 2017 at Drummoyne Oval.

=== 2018: Limited overs debut, first T20 World Cup title ===
Molineux was named in Australia's squad for a tour of India in March 2018. She made her debut for the team in a Twenty20 International (T20I) on 22 March at Brabourne Stadium, bowling two overs and conceding 15 runs during the six-wicket victory. Her first T20I scalp came on 1 October against New Zealand at Allan Border Field, removing Bernadine Bezuidenhout for a score of three as Australia went on to win by six wickets. Molineux's One Day International (ODI) debut came on 18 October at Kinrara Academy Oval. She took 1/9 from seven overs in what was a five-wicket defeat of Pakistan.

Playing every game in Australia's successful 2018 ICC Women's World Twenty20 campaign, Molineux claimed four wickets across the tournament, including figures of 2/20 during a 33-run group match defeat of New Zealand to help qualify for the semi-finals. She was used as an opening bowler in the final against England at Sir Vivian Richards Stadium, which her team went on to win by eight wickets.

=== 2019: Shoulder injury, Test debut ===
In February 2019, Molineux dislocated her non-dominant right shoulder while diving during a fielding drill at a training session, consequently ruling her out of an upcoming ODI series against New Zealand. She underwent surgery in March and was awarded a national contract from Cricket Australia in April.

Molineux was not initially selected in Australia's squad for the 2019 Women's Ashes, instead she was included in a concurrent Australia A tour of the United Kingdom, while coach Matthew Mott flagged her as a potential mid-series call-up if fitness permitted. This inclusion came to fruition, and she made her Test debut at the County Ground in Taunton on 18 July. After being presented her baggy green from Belinda Clark, Molineux went on to make a strong contribution throughout the match which ended in a draw, scoring 21 and 41 as a lower-order batter while also claiming bowling figures of 4/95 from 37 overs. Her maiden Test wicket dismissed England captain Heather Knight for 28. She then took 1/26 in the first T20I of the tour, played at Chelmsford on 26 July, which Australia won by 93 runs to seal a comprehensive series victory.

=== 2020: Second T20 World Cup title ===
In January 2020, Molineux was named in Australia's squad for the ICC Women's T20 World Cup, taking place on home soil during the following month. She did not play in any of the group matches of the tournament, having been sidelined with a corked thigh after falling on a ball during training. Her timely inclusion for the semi-final against South Africa at the Sydney Cricket Ground—replacing an injured Ellyse Perry—proved crucial, as she dismissed Lizelle Lee early in the second innings before Australia held on to win by a narrow five-run margin. In the final, played at the Melbourne Cricket Ground, Molineux took 1/21 to help her team defeat India by 85 runs and win a second-consecutive world championship.

Molineux was named in the Australia squad for the 2024 ICC Women's T20 World Cup.

=== 2026 ===
Molinuex was appointed Australia's all-format captain following Alyssa Healy's retirement in January.
