= Tia (name) =

- Pronunciation: TEE-ə
- Gender: Primarily feminine
- Language: Various

Origin
- Meaning: Various

Other names
- Related names: Alethea, Althea, Anthea, Cristiana, Cynthia, Dorothea, Dorothy, Hypatia, Laetitia, Letitia, Lucretia, Tatiana, Taya, Tayah, Tea, Téa, Teah, Teya, Teyah, Thea, Theia, Theodora, Theodosia, Tiana, Tianna, Tiara, Tija, Tiya, Tíyà, Tiyah

Tia is a usually feminine given name with diverse, unrelated origins from multiple cultures. It might have originated as a short form of names containing the word element tia or thea. The word tía is the Portuguese and Spanish word for aunt. Some parents might have used the name in reference to the alcoholic beverage Tia Maria. Tiana might be an extended version of the name. Tia is the goddess of peaceful death in Haida mythology. Tia was also the name of an ancient Egyptian princess who lived during the 19th Dynasty; the meaning of her name possibly referred to royal status. In some cultures, including the Ancient Egyptian and Maori, Tia has been used as a male name.

== Surname origins ==
Tia is also a surname with diverse origins. It is an alternate Romanization of the Chinese surname Xie (謝) or Cheng (程) possibly based on their Hokkien pronunciations: Siā and Thiâⁿ, respectively. It is also a West African surname of uncertain origins, in use in Ghana and the Ivory Coast.

== Given name usage ==
The name first appeared among the top 1,000 names given to American girls in the United States in 1957. It ranked among the top 1,000 names for American girls between 1962 and 2012. It also ranked among the top 1,000 names for girls in England and Wales between 1996 and 2021, among the top 100 names for newborn girls in Croatia between 2017 and 2022, and among the top 100 names for girls in Slovenia between 2000 and 2022. It ranked among the top 500 names for girls born in France in 2017 and then declined in use.

== People ==
- Tia (Māori explorer), early Māori explorer and chief
- Tia (princess), ancient Egyptian princess during the 19th dynasty
- Tia (overseer of treasury), ancient Egyptian official, husband of Princess Tia
- Tia Bajpai (born 1989), born Twinkle, Indian actress and singer
- Tia Ballard (born 1986), American actress, artist, comedian, writer, and voice actress for FUNimation Entertainment
- Tia Barrett (1947–2009), born Te Rongotoa, New Zealand diplomat
- Tia Billinger (born 1999), better known as Bonnie Blue, pornographic actress and OnlyFans content creator
- Tia Blake (1952–2015), born Christiana, American singer-songwriter and writer
- Tia Blassingame (born 1971), American book artist and publisher
- Tia Carrere (born 1967), born Althea, American-Canadian actress, model and singer
- Tia Chan (born 2002), also known as Chén Tíyà, Canadian-Chinese ice hockey player
- Tia Clayton (born 2004), Jamaican sprinter
- Tia Darti (born 1993), Indonesian footballer
- Tia DeNora (born 1958), professor of Sociology of Music and director of research at the University of Exeter
- Tia Doca (1932–2009), born Jilçaria Cruz Costa and nicknamed "Tia Doca" or "Aunt Doca", Brazilian samba dancer
- Tia Edwards (born 1995), American sitting volleyball player
- Tia Eron (born 1972), born Eronildes Vasconcelos Carvalho and nicknamed "Tia Eron" or "Aunt Eron", Brazilian politician
- Tia Fuller (born 1976), American saxophonist, composer, and educator
- Tia Gostelow (born 1999), Indigenous Australian singer-songwriter
- Tia Hellebaut (born 1978), Belgian Olympic champion and athlete
- M. Tia Johnson (born 1959), American lawyer and academic
- Tia Jones (born 2000), American track and field athlete
- Tia Kansara, British sustainable design expert and co-founder of Kansara Hackney
- Tia Kar, Indian actress and singer
- Tia Keyes, Irish specialist in photochemistry and molecular spectroscopy
- Tia Lessin, American documentary filmmaker
- Tia Mowry (born 1978), American actress and singer
- Tia Neiva (1926–1985), born Neiva Chavez Zelaya and known as "Tia Neiva" or "Aunt Neiva", Brazilian medium
- Tia Norfleet (born 1986), born Shauntia, American NASCAR driver
- Tia Paschal (born 1969), American women's basketball player
- Tia Powell, American psychiatrist and bioethicist
- Tia Ray (born 1984), born Yuán Yàwéi, Chinese singer-songwriter
- Tia Sharp (2000–2012), English murder victim
- Tia Rigg (1998–2010), English murder victim
- Tia Shorts, American beauty queen
- TiaCorine, born Tia Shultz, American rapper and songwriter
- Tia Surica, born Iranette Ferreira Barcellos and known as "Tia Surica" or "Aunt Surica" (born 1940), Brazilian samba singer and actress
- Tia Texada (born 1971), American actress and singer
- Tia-Clair Toomey (born 1993), Australian weightlifter and CrossFit Games athlete
- Tia Williams, American author

=== Surname ===
- John Tia (born 1954), Ghanaian politician
- Olivier Tia (born 1982), Ivorian footballer

== Fictional characters ==
- Tia Dalma, from the Pirates of the Caribbean franchise
- Tia and Megumi Oumi, in the anime and manga series Zatch Bell!
- Tia, in the 1968 novel Escape to Witch Mountain by Alexander Key and movies Escape to Witch Mountain and Return from Witch Mountain
- Tia, in the French TV series Galactik Football

== See also ==
- Tiia
- TIA (disambiguation)
