= Dorothea =

- Gender: Female

Origin
- Origin: Greek
- Meaning: Gift of God

Other names
- Related names: Dorothy, Dora, Dot, Dottie, Dolly, Theodora

Dorothea, also spelt Dorothee (German), Dorothée (French), and Dorotea, is a female given name from Greek Δωροθέα (Dōrothéa) meaning "god's gift". In English it is more commonly spelt Dorothy.

People with this name include:

== Aristocracy ==
- Countess Palatine Dorothea Sophie of Neuburg (1670–1748), Duchess of Parma
- Dorotea Gonzaga (1449–1468), Duchess consort of Milan
- Dorothea, Abbess of Quedlinburg (1591–1617), Princess-Abbess of Quedlinburg
- Dorothea Friederike of Brandenburg-Ansbach (1676–1731), last Countess of Hanau
- Dorothea Hedwig of Brunswick-Wolfenbüttel (1587–1609), Princess of Brunswick-Wolfenbüttel, and Princess of Anhalt-Zerbst by marriage
- Dorothea Maria of Anhalt (1574–1617), Duchess of Saxe-Weimar
- Dorothea Maria of Saxe-Gotha-Altenburg (1654–1682), German princess
- Dorothea Marie of Saxe-Gotha-Altenburg (1674–1713), Duchess of Saxe-Meiningen
- Dorothea of Anhalt-Zerbst (1607–1634), Princess of Anhalt-Zerbst
- Dorothea of Brandenburg (disambiguation)
- Dorothea of Bulgaria (fl. 1370–1390), Queen of Bosnia
- Dorothea of Denmark (disambiguation)
- Dorothea of Saxe-Lauenburg (1511–1571), queen consort of Christian III, King of Denmark and Norway
- Dorothea of Saxony (1563–1587), Saxon princess
- Dorothea Sophia, Abbess of Quedlinburg (1587–1645)
- Dorothea Susanne of Simmern (1544–1592), princess of the Electoral Palatinate, Duchess of Saxe-Weimar by marriage
- Margravine Dorothea Charlotte of Brandenburg-Ansbach (1661–1705), Countess of Hesse-Darmstadt
- Princess Dorothea of Courland (1793–1862), Baltic German noblewoman
- Princess Dorothea of Saxe-Coburg and Gotha (1881–1967)
- Princess Dorothea of Schleswig-Holstein-Sonderburg-Beck (1685–1761), Margravine of Brandenburg-Bayreuth-Kulmbach by marriage

== Saints ==
- Dorothea of Alexandria (fl. 320), martyr
- Dorothea of Caesarea (fl. 311), martyr, patron saint of florists
- Dorothea of Montau (1347–1394), Roman Catholic saint, hermitess and visionary

== Other people ==
=== First name ===
- Dorothea Bate (1878–1951), Welsh palaeontologist
- Dorotea Bucca (1360–1436), Italian physician
- Dorotea van Fornenbergh (fl. 1647–1697), Dutch stage actress
- Dorothea Binz (1920–1947), German concentration camp officer executed for war crimes
- Dorothea Brooking (1916–1999), British children's television producer and director
- Dorothea Lambert Chambers (1878–1960), British tennis and badminton player
- Dorothea H. Denslow (1900–1971), American sculptor, educator
- Dorothea Dix (1802–1887), American social activist
- Dorothea Douglass Lambert Chambers (1878–1960), English tennis player
- Dorothea Dunckel (1799–1878), Swedish playwright
- Dorothea Erxleben (1715–1762), first woman doctor in Germany
- Dorothea Ewart (1870–1956), British historian
- Dorothea Fairbridge (1860–1931), South African novelist
- Dorothea Gerard (1855–1915), Scottish novelist
- Dorothea Hoffman (d. 1710), Swedish hat maker
- Dorothea Hooper (1932–2024), American politician
- Dorothea Barth Jörgensen (born 1990), Swedish fashion model
- Dorothea Jordan (1761–1816), Irish actress and mistress of the future King William IV of the United Kingdom
- Dorothea Kalpakidou (born 1983), Greek discus thrower
- Dorothea Kent (1916–1990), American actress
- Dorothea Kliche-Behnke (born 1981), German politician
- Dorothea Klumpke (1861–1942), American astronomer
- Dorothea Knighton (1780–1862), English painter
- Dorothea Köhler (born 1943), German conductor and music educator
- Dorothea Köring (1880–1945), German tennis player
- Dorothea Krag (1675–1754), Danish postmaster
- Dorothea Kreß (1924–2018), German shot putter
- Dorothea Krook-Gilead (1920–1989), Israeli literary scholar
- Dorothea Lange (1895–1965), American documentary photographer and photojournalist
- Dorothea Lasky (born 1978), American poet
- Dorothea Mackellar (1885–1968), Australian poet and writer
- Dorothea Macnee (1896–1984) British socialite and mother of Patrick Macnee
- Dorothea Maria Lösch (1730–1799), Swedish marine captain
- Dorothea Nelson (1903–1994), American librarian
- Dorothea Nicolai (born 1962), German costume designer, stage designer
- Dorothea Ostrelska (fl. 1577) Swedish court dwarf
- Dorothea Phillips (born 1928), British actress
- Dorothea Puente (1929–2011), American serial killer
- Dorothea Röschmann (born 1967), German soprano
- Dorothea Schwarz (born 2005), Austrian luger
- Dorothea Tanning (1910–2012), American painter, printmaker, sculptor and writer
- Dorothea Viehmann (1755–1816), German storyteller
- Dorothea Waddingham (1899–1936), English murderer
- Dorothea Wieck (1908–1986), German actress
- Dorothea Wierer (born 1990), Italian biathlete
- Dorothea Widmer (1758–1781), Swiss victim of spousal abuse and murderer
- Dorothea Wyss (c. 1430/32–after 1487) married Niklaus von Flüe, the patron saint of Switzerland
- Dorothee Bär (born 1968), German politician of the Christian Social Union of Bavaria (CSU)
- Dorothee Hess-Maier, semi-retired German publisher
- Dorothee Kern (born 1966), German biochemist and academic, former basketball player for the East German team
- Dorothee Mields (born 1971), German soprano concert singer
- Dorothee Sölle (1929–2003), German liberation theologian
- Dorothee Stapelfeldt (born 1956), German politician of the Social Democratic Party (SPD)
- Dorothea Juliana Wallich (1657–1725), German alchemist

=== Middle name ===
- Johanna Dorothea Lindenaer (1664–1737), Dutch writer
- Angela Dorothea Merkel (born 1954), former Chancellor of Germany
- Christina Doreothea Stuart (fl. 1774), Norwegian artist

=== Single name ===
- Dorothée (born 1953) French singer and television presenter

== Fictional characters ==
- Dorothea Arnault, in the video games Fire Emblem: Three Houses and Fire Emblem Warriors: Three Hopes

== See also ==
- Doda (singer), (born Dorota Rabczewska; 1984), Polish singer-songwriter and actress
- Dorota Nieznalska (born 1973), Polish artist
- Dorothea (disambiguation)
- Dorothy (given name)
- Thea (name)
- Tea (given name)
