= Theodora =

Given name

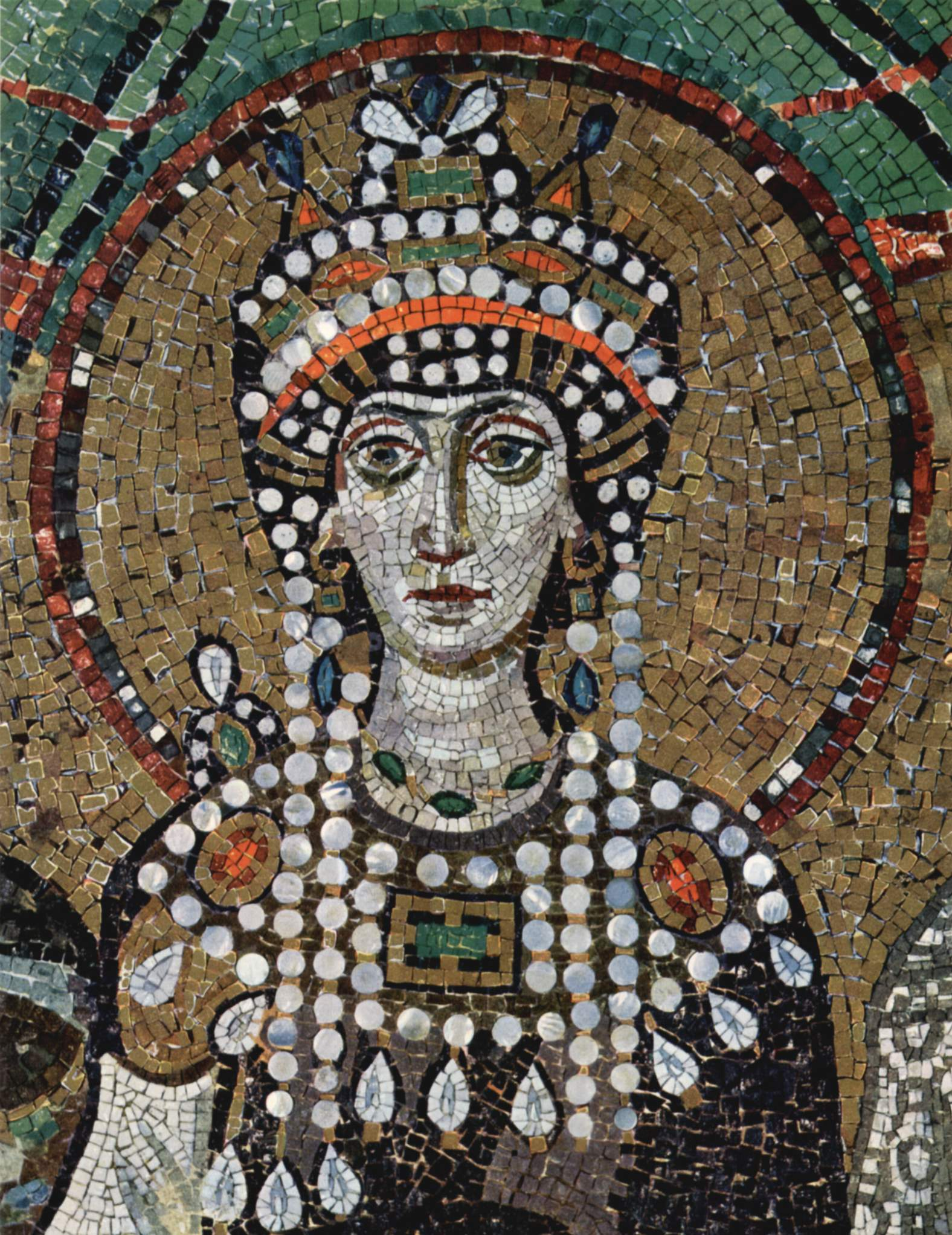
- The sixth century Byzantine empress Theodora is one famous bearer of the name.
- Gender: Female

Origin
- Origin: Greek
- Meaning: "God's gift"

Other names
- Nicknames: Dora, Thea, Tia
- Related names: Dorothea, Dorothy, Teodora

Theodora (Greek: Θεοδώρα, Theodōra) is a feminine given name, the feminine version of Theodore, from the Greek θεός theos 'god' + δῶρον doron 'gift'. Theodora is first attested in Mycenaean Greek, written in the Linear B syllabic script, as 𐀳𐀃𐀈𐀨, te-o-do-ra. The name Dorothy (Greek: Δωροθέα, Dōrothea) contains the same word elements in reverse order. It was the name of several saints and queens, including Theodora, a 6th-century Byzantine empress honored as a saint in the early Christian Church. Teodora, a variant, is among the top 10 most popular names for girls born in Serbia between 2003 and 2005.

== Feminine variants ==
- Dievodora (Lithuanian)
- Bohdana (Ukrainian)
- Božidarka (Serbian)
- Dora (English, Indonesian, Spanish, Bulgarian)
- Théodore (French)
- Feodora, Fedora - Феодора, Федора (Russian)
- Tea, Teja (Finnish), German, Scandinavian, Slovenian, Croatian
- Teddi, Teddie, Teddy (English)
- Teodóra (Hungarian)
- Feodora, Theodora, Teodora (Indonesian)
- Teodora, Theodhora, Dhora (Albanian)
- Teodora/Теодора (Bulgarian, Macedonian, Italian, Polish, Portuguese, Romanian, Spanish, Swedish, Serbian, Bulgarian, Macedonian)
- Teodora (Polish)
- Thea (English, German, Scandinavian)
- Theda (German)
- Todora/Todorka (Bulgarian, Macedonian)
- Θεοδώρα, Δώρα, Ντόρα (Greek)
- Tidora (Aramaic/Syriac)
- Tedora (in Eritrea)

== People ==
=== Pre-modern world ===
==== Byzantine empresses ====
- Theodora (wife of Justinian I) (c. 500–548), saint by the Orthodox Church
- Theodora of Khazaria, 7th-century empress, wife of Justinian II
- Theodora (wife of Theophilos), 9th-century empress, saint by the Orthodox Church
- Theodora (wife of Romanos I), 10th-century empress
- Theodora (daughter of Constantine VII), 10th-century empress, wife of John I Tzimiskes
- Theodora Porphyrogenita (c. 980–1056), empress regnant in 1042 and 1055–1056
- Theodora Palaiologina (Byzantine empress) (c. 1240–1303), wife of Michael VIII Palaiologos

==== Trebizonian empresses ====
- Theodora Axuchina, empress consort of Alexios I of Trebizond (c. 1182–1222)
- Theodora of Trebizond (before 1253–after 1285), empress regnant from 1284 to 1285
- Theodora Kantakouzene (c. 1240–after 1290), empress consort of Alexios III of Trebizond
- Theodora Kantakouzene (wife of Alexios IV of Trebizond) (died 1426), empress consort of Alexios IV of Trebizond

==== Others ====
- Theodora (Roman martyr) (died 120), Christian martyr and saint
- Theodora and Didymus (died 304), early Christian martyrs
- Flavia Maximiana Theodora (died before 337), known simply as Theodora, daughter of the Roman emperor Maximian and second wife of emperor Constantius I
- Theodora of Emesa, 5th-century Neoplatonist
- Theodora of Alexandria (died c. 490), Eastern Orthodox saint
- Episcopa Theodora, mother of Pope Paschal I in the 9th century
- Theodora (senatrix) (c. 870–916), Roman senatrix and mother of Marozia; concubine to Pope Sergius III
- Theodora Komnene (disambiguation), various women from the 11th to 15th centuries
- Theodora of Arta, 13th-century Empress of Epirus
- Theodora Tocco (died 1429), despoina consort of Constantine, Despot in Morea (later Constantine XI Palaiologos)
- Theodora of Sihla (c. 1650–?), Romanian Orthodox saint
- Theodora of Hesse-Darmstadt (fl. 1727), daughter of Philip of Hesse-Darmstadt and Duchess consort of Guastalla

=== Modern world ===
- Princess Theodora of Greece and Denmark (1906–1969), daughter of Prince Andrew of Greece and Denmark
- Princess Theodora of Greece and Denmark (born 1983), daughter of Constantine II of Greece
- Princess Theodora of Liechtenstein (born 2004), Liechtensteiner environmentalist
- Dora Bakoyannis (born 1954), Greek politician
- Theo Burrell (1986–2026), British antiques specialist
- Theodora Goss (born 1968), Hungarian-born American novelist
- Theodora Keogh (1919–2008), American novelist
- Theodora Kroeber (1897–1979), American anthropologist
- Tonie Nathan (1923–2014), American media producer and political activist
- Theodora Sayn-Wittgenstein (born 1986), German aristocrat
- Theodora Skipitares, American interdisciplinary artist
- Theodora (singer), French-Congolese singer Lili Théodora Mbangayo Mujinga (born 2003)

== Fictional characters ==
- Theodora, the Wicked Witch of the West in the 2013 film Oz the Great and Powerful
- Theodora Baumgarten, the main character of the 2007 Connie Willis novella D.A.
- Theodora, in the 1959 Gothic horror novel The Haunting of Hill House
- Theodora, a protagonist from the video game Fire Emblem: Fortune's Weave

== See also ==
- Teodora
