= Tiia =

Female given name

- Gender: Female
- Language: Estonian, Finnish
- Name day: 1 November (Estonia); 6 February (Finland)

Origin
- Region of origin: Estonia, Finland

Other names
- Related names: Tiiu, Tea, Tia

Tiia is an Estonian and Finnish feminine given name.

As of 1 January 2021, 2,201 women in Estonia have the first name Tiia, making it the 72nd most popular female name in the country. The name is most commonly found in Põlva County. Individuals bearing the name Tiia include:

- Tiia Eeskivi (born 1969), Estonian hurdler
- Tiia Hautala (born 1972), Finnish heptathlete
- Tiia Koivisto
- Tiia Kõnnussaar (born 1965), Estonian writer, editor and journalist
- Tiia-Ester Loitme (born 1933), Estonian conductor
- Tiia Pajarinen
- Tiia Peltonen (born 1995), Finnish footballer
- Tiia Piili (born 1979), Finnish gymnast
- Tiia Reima (born 1973), Finnish ice hockey player
- Tiia Strandén
- Tiia-Maria Talvitie (born 1994), Finnish biathlete
- Tiia Teder (born 1959), Estonian musicologist, music journalist and editor
- Tiia Toomet (born 1947), Estonian writer and poet

== See also ==
- Tia
