= Sydney Hervé Aufrère =

French Egyptologist, archaeologist and director of research

Sydney Hervé Aufrère (born July 2, 1951, in Boulogne-Billancourt) is a French Egyptologist, archaeologist, and director of research at CNRS.

From 1973 to 1976 he worked in the Department of Egyptian Antiquities of the Louvre Museum, then for sixteen months (1976-1977), the "Centre for Documentation of Ancient Egypt" (CEDA), Cairo. He participated from 1976 to 1980 in archaeological expeditions in the Valley of the Queens (Tuya's tomb QV80) and the Ramesseum.

From 1981 to 1983 he was assistant teacher of Egyptian Archaeology at the Ecole du Louvre, then in 1983/84, he was a lecturer in Egyptian inscriptions of the same school.

From 1985 to 1989, he was a scientific member of the French Institute of Oriental Archaeology in Cairo, and participated in excavations.

In 1991, he was appointed director of research at CNRS, and was affiliated with the Université Paul Valéry from 1991 to 2005. From 1992 to 2003 he supervised the unit that specializes in texts from the Ptolemaic period.

Since October 2005 he has been affiliated with the University of Provence-Aix-Marseille.

== Publications ==
- Égypte et Provence, civilisation, survivances et cabinet de curiosités, Avignon, Fondation du musée Calvet, 1985
- La momie et la tempête, la curiosité égyptienne en Provence au début du XVIIe siècle, Avignon, A. Barthélemy, 1990
- with J.C. Golvin & Jean-Claude Goyon, L'Égypte restituée, sites et temples de Haute-Égypte, vol. tome 1, Paris, Éditions Errance, 1991
- L'univers minéral dans la pensée égyptienne, I-II, Le Caire, Institut français d'archéologie orientale, coll. « BdE », 1991
- with J.C. Golvin & Jean-Claude Goyon, L'Égypte restituée, Sites et temples des déserts, vol. tome 2, Paris, Éditions Errance, 1994
- Dieux du désert égyptien, Ha et la défense mythique des déserts de l'ouest [« L'archéologue, n°11 »], Paris, Archéologie nouvelle, 1995
- Description de l'Égypte, ou, recueil des observations et des recherches qui ont été faites en Égypte pendant l'expédition de l'Armée française, publié sous les ordres de Napoléon Bonaparte, France, Bibliothèque de l'Image, 1997
- with J.C. Golvin & Jean-Claude Goyon, L'Égypte restituée, sites, temples et pyramides de Moyenne et Basse Égypte de la naissance de la civilisation pharaonique à l'époque gréco-romaine, vol. tome 3, Paris, Éditions Errance, 1997
- Un prolongement méditerranéen du mythe de la Lointaine à l’époque tardive, Le Caire, Institut français d'archéologie orientale, 1998, p. 19-39
- Encyclopédie religieuse de l'univers végétal, Montpellier, Université Paul Valéry-Montpellier III, 1999-2001
- Le propylône d'Amon-Rê-Montou à Karnak Nord, Le Caire, Institut français d'archéologie orientale, coll. « MIFAO, n°117 », 2000
- with Maximilien Dauber, L'Égypte en question, Avignon, Éditions A. Barthélemy, 2005 (ISBN 2879232155)
