= Theodosia (given name) =

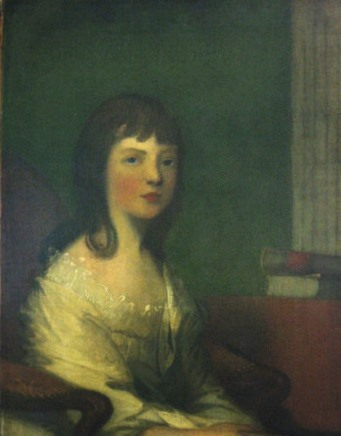
- Theodosia Burr Alston by Gilbert Stuart
- Pronunciation: English: /ˌθiːəˈdoʊʒə/ or English: /ˌθiːəˈdoʊsiːə/

Origin
- Origin: Greek
- Meaning: "giving to God.”

Other names
- See also: Dosia, Fedosia, Fedosiya, Fedya, Fenya, Feodosia, Feodosiya, Teddy, Teodosija, Teodozja, Thea, Theda, Theo, Theodosius, Tia

Theodosia is a feminine given name of Greek origin meaning "giving to God". It is a feminine version of the Greek name Theodosius. Several early saints bore the name.

The name was most popular in the United States in the 1700s and 1800s and has been rare since. It has increased in use in recent years for American girls in part due to the popularity of the musical Hamilton, which features a song entitled Dear Theodosia. The musical includes as characters fictionalized versions of the historical figures Aaron Burr and his daughter Theodosia Burr Alston.

== People ==
- Theodosia, Christian name of Rostislava Mstislavna, Grand Duchess of Kievan Rus
- Theodosia of Tyre, 3rd century Christian martyr
- Theodosia (fl. 6th century), first wife of Liuvigild, Visigothic King of Hispania and Septimania
- Theodosia of Constantinople, 7th–8th century Byzantine nun, martyr and saint of the Eastern Orthodox Church
- Theodosia, wife of Leo V (c. 775–c. 826), Empress consort of Leo V the Armenian
- Theda Bara (1885–1955), stage name of actress Theodosia Burr Goodman
- Theodosia Burr Alston (1783–1813), daughter of U.S. Vice President Aaron Burr
- Theodosia Bartow Prevost (1746 – 1794), wife of U.S Vice President Aaron Burr
- Theodosia Burr Shepherd (1845–1906), American botanist
- Theodosia Ann Dean (1819–1843), English missionary
- Theodosia Garrison (1874–1944), American poet
- Theodosia Harris (1877–1938), American screenwriter
- Theodosia Ivie or Ivy (1629–1697), English adventuress
- Theodosia Meade, Countess of Clanwilliam (1744–1817)
- Theodosia Ntokou, classical pianist
- Theodosia Okoh (1922–2015), Ghanaian stateswoman and teacher known for designing the national flag of Ghana
- Anne Steele (1717–1778), English poet and hymn writer who published under the pseudonym Theodosia
- Theodosia Stirling (1815–1904), Australian actor and singer

== Fictional characters ==
- Theodosia Burr Alston, in the book My Theodosia by Anya Seton
- Theodosia Throckmorton, main character in Theodosia and the Serpents of Chaos, a children's novel by R.L. LaFevers
  - The television series based on the novel
- Theodosia, from the play The Royal Master by James Shirley
