= TIA (disambiguation) =

TIA most commonly refers to the transient ischemic attack, a "mini-stroke".

TIA or Tia may also refer to:

== People ==
- Tia (name), including a list of people and fictional characters with the given name or surname
- TiA, stage name of a female Japanese singer (born 1987)
- Tia (singer), stage name of a 21st century female Japanese singer
- Tia (Māori explorer) (fl. c. 1400?), early Māori explorer and chief
- Tia (princess) an ancient Egyptian princess of the 19th Dynasty
- Tia (overseer of treasury), ancient Egyptian official, husband of Princess Tia

== Science and technology ==
- Tia (moth), a genus of moths in the family Tortricidae
- Transimpedance amplifier, a type of current-to-voltage converter
- Television Interface Adaptor, a custom chip for the Atari 2600 game console
- The Internet Adapter, 1993 software created by Cyberspace Development
- Transient ischemic attack, a temporary stroke.

== Aviation ==
- Tampa International Airport, US, IATA code TPA
- Texas International Airlines, US, ICAO code
- Tirana International Airport Nënë Tereza, Albania, IATA code
- Trans International Airlines, former U.S. airline company
- Tribhuvan International Airport (IATA code: KTM), Kathmandu, Nepal
- Trivandrum International Airport (IATA code: TRV), Thiruvananthapuram, Kerala, India
- Tucson International Airport (IATA code: TUS), Arizona, US
- Tan Son Nhat International Airport, (IATA code: SGN), Ho Chi Minh City, Vietnam

== Business and government ==
- Tía, a South American supermarket chain based in Ecuador
- Telecommunications Industry Association, US
- Total Information Awareness or Terrorism Information Awareness Program, US
- Transparency in Armaments, UN initiative
- Trust Indenture Act of 1939, US
- Truth in Accounting, an American financial think tank

== Places ==
- Tia, New South Wales, a settlement and parish in Australia
- Tia, Burkina Faso, a village in the Siglé Department of Boulkiemdé Province
- Tia, Fiji, a village of Motusa in Fiji
- Tia, Leh, a village in India

== Arts and entertainment ==
- "T.I.A.", a song in the album Troubadour by K'naan
- Tia, a Diva Starz doll
- T.I.A., a secret spy agency from Spanish comic series Mort & Phil (Spanish: Mortadelo y Filemón)

== Other uses ==
- Tia (goddess), a goddess in the Haida religion
- The Intellectual Activist, American monthly Objectivist magazine
- Tournament Indoor Association, a division of Tournament of Bands, US

== See also ==
- T1A (disambiguation)
- TLA (disambiguation)
- Tias (disambiguation)
