= 2022–23 Women's National Cricket League season =

Cricket tournament

Women's National Cricket League 2022–23 season
- Dates: 23 September 2022 – 25 February 2023
- Administrator: Cricket Australia
- Cricket format: Limited overs cricket (50 overs)
- Tournament format(s): Double Round-robin and final
- Champions: Tasmania (2nd title)
- Participants: 7
- Matches: 43
- Most runs: (Tasmania) Elyse Villani (705)
- Most wickets: (Tasmania) Sarah Coyte (30)
- Official website: cricket.com.au

The 2022–23 Women's National Cricket League season was the 27th season of the Women's National Cricket League, the women's domestic limited overs cricket competition in Australia. The tournament ran from 23 September 2022 to 25 February 2023.

On 29 June 2022, Cricket Australia announced the fixtures for the tournament; a total of 43 matches will be played, with each of the seven teams playing each other team twice. Tasmania was the defending champion.

Tasmania also eventually won the tournament, and was awarded its second WNCL title, beating South Australia in the rain-affected final, which has been "... dubbed the most incredible domestic cricket match ever played on Australian soil."

During the final's very last over, described by news.com.au as "[o]ne of the craziest finishes in cricket", Tasmania took five wickets for two runs, to win the match and the championship by just one run (DLS method).

== Ladder ==
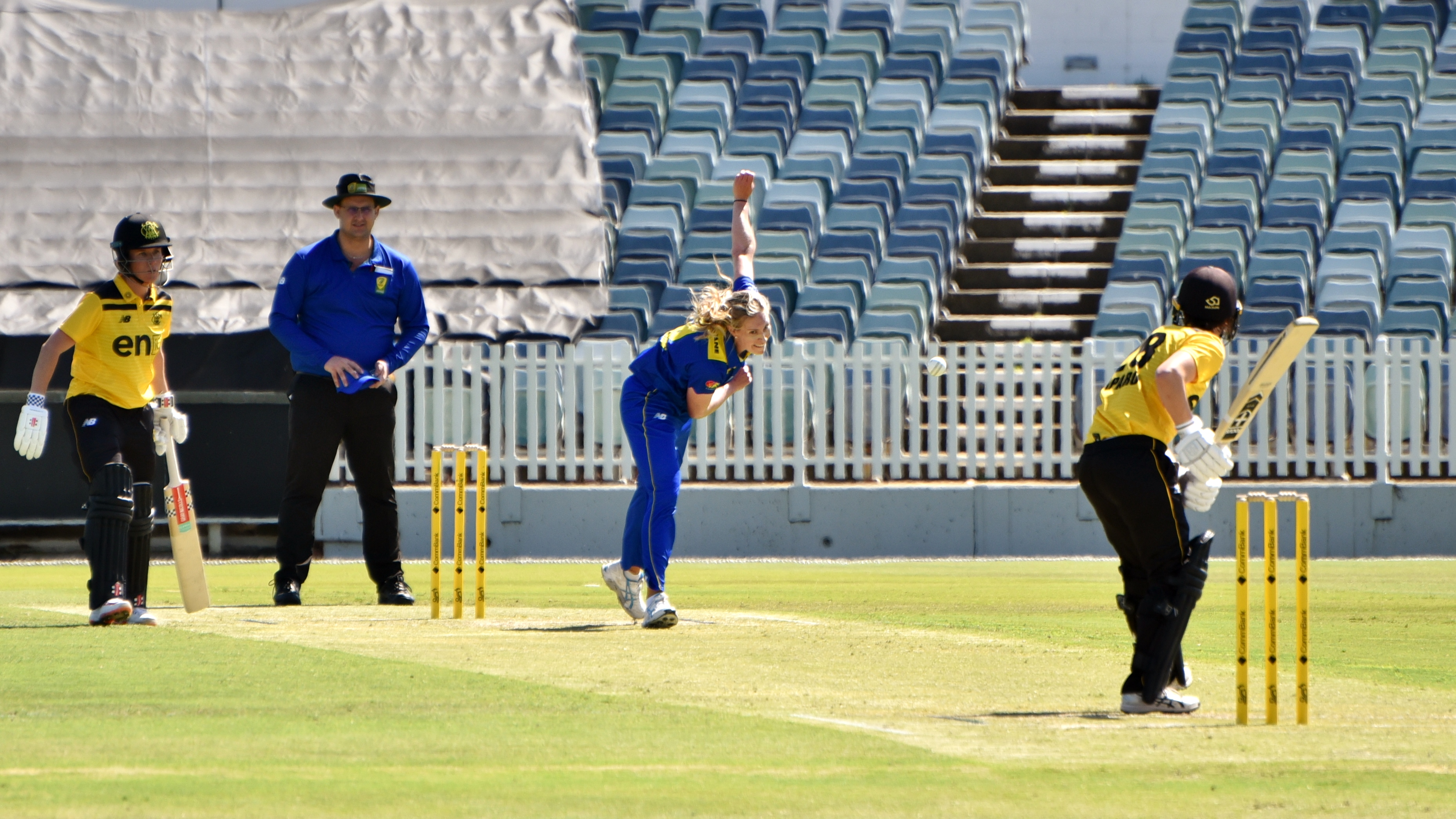
Former international Holly Ferling bowling for the ACT to WA captain Chloe Piparo at the WACA Ground, Perth, on 25 September 2022. The non-striker, Beth Mooney, was on her way to a player-of-the-match-winning 151*.

Pos	Team	Pld	W	L	T	MA	BP	Ded	Pts	NRR
1	Tasmania	12	10	2	0	0	6	0	46	1.278
2	South Australia	12	9	2	1	0	3	0.5	40.5	0.445
3	Queensland	12	7	5	0	0	6	0	34	0.240
4	Victoria	12	5	6	1	0	3	1	24	0.219
5	Western Australia	12	4	8	0	0	3	0	19	0.043
6	New South Wales	12	4	8	0	0	0	0	16	−1.054
7	Australian Capital Territory	12	2	10	0	0	0	0.5	7.5	−1.254

Source: ESPN Cricinfo
Rules for classification: The top two ranked teams will qualify for the final.
- Point system: 4 for a win, 2 each for a tie/no result/abandoned match, 0 for a loss
- Bonus point system: 1 for a win with a run rate 1.25 times that of the opposition

== Fixtures ==
=== Round 1 ===
Match 1
23 September 2022
10:00
Scorecard

Victoria; 264/2 (50 overs)	v	South Australia (home team); 268/7 (49.3 overs)
Ellyse Perry 117* (143); Ellie Falconer 1/28 (5 overs)		Tahlia McGrath 111* (111); Sophie Day 2/27 (7 overs)

South Australia won by 3 wickets
Karen Rolton Oval, Adelaide
Umpires: Dhaval Bhatt and Harry Singh
Player of the match: Tahlia McGrath (South Australia)

- South Australia won the toss and elected to field.
- Points: South Australia 4, Victoria 0

Match 2
23 September 2022
10:00
Scorecard

Australian Capital Territory; 143 (39.4 overs)	v	Western Australia (home team); 147/2 (30.1 overs)
Rebecca Carter 65 (100); Alana King 5/12 (8 overs)		Chloe Piparo 75* (95); Olivia Porter 1/25 (4 overs)

Western Australia won by 8 wickets
WACA Ground, Perth
Umpires: Jarryd Buscall and Trent Steenholdt
Player of the match: Alana King (Western Australia)

- Western Australia won the toss and elected to field.
- Points: Western Australia 5, Australian Capital Territory 0

Match 3
23 September 2022
14:00 (D/N)
Scorecard

Queensland; 307/9 (50 overs)	v	New South Wales (home team); 196 (43.1 overs)
Georgia Voll 145 (161); Ebony Hoskin 3/39 (10 overs)		Tahlia Wilson 65 (75); Grace Harris 3/24 (8 overs)

Queensland won by 111 runs
North Sydney Oval, North Sydney
Umpires: Andrew Hamilton and Daniel Moran
Player of the match: Georgia Voll (Queensland)

- New South Wales won the toss and elected to field.
- Points: Queensland 5, New South Wales 0

Match 4
25 September 2022
10:00
Scorecard

(home team) New South Wales; 155 (41.4 overs)	v	Queensland; 159/2 (19.4 overs)
Phoebe Litchfield 42 (60); Georgia Prestwidge 3/28 (8 overs)		Grace Harris 77* (51); Sammy-Jo Johnson 2/25 (6 overs)

Queensland won by 8 wickets
North Sydney Oval, North Sydney
Umpires: Bede Sajowitz and Roberto Howard
Player of the match: Grace Harris (Queensland)

- Queensland won the toss and elected to field.
- Points: Queensland 5, New South Wales 0

Match 5
25 September 2022
10:00
Scorecard

(home team) South Australia; 200/9 (50 overs)	v	Victoria; 118/5 (23 overs)
Jemma Barsby 42 (47); Sophie Day 2/27 (8 overs)		Sophie Molineux 56 (53); Jemma Barsby 4/21 (5 overs)

Match Tied (DLS method)
Karen Rolton Oval, Adelaide
Umpires: Eloise Sheridan and Harry Singh
Player of the match: Jemma Barsby (South Australia)

- Victoria won the toss and elected to field.
- Victoria innings reduced to 23 overs due to rain; target was 119.
- Under the rules of the competition, a Super Over is due to be played in the event of a tie; however, rain interrupted the match before the Super Over could be started.
- South Australia were deducted 0.5 points for a slow over rate.
- Victoria were deducted 1 point for a slow over rate.
- Points: South Australia 1.5, Victoria 1

Match 6
25 September 2022
10:00
Scorecard

(home team) Western Australia; 297/6 (50 overs)	v	Australian Capital Territory; 180 (43.3 overs)
Beth Mooney 151* (140); Gabby Sutcliffe 2/45 (6 overs)		Katie Mack 57 (65); Alana King 3/31 (10 overs)

Western Australia won by 117 runs
WACA Ground, Perth
Umpires: Jamie Thomas and Trent Steenholdt
Player of the match: Beth Mooney (Western Australia)

- Australian Capital Territory won the toss and elected to field.
- Australian Capital Territory were deducted 0.5 points for a slow over rate.
- Points: Western Australia 5, Australian Capital Territory -0.5

Match 7
30 September 2022
14:00 (D/N)
Scorecard

(home team) New South Wales; 175/4 (32.5 overs)	v	Western Australia; 213 (31.5 overs)
Erin Burns 54* (44); Piepa Cleary 3/30 (7 overs)		Mathilda Carmichael 68 (56); Maitlan Brown 4/41 (5.5 overs)

New South Wales won by 8 runs (DLS method)
North Sydney Oval, North Sydney
Umpires: Bede Sajowitz and Roberto Howard
Player of the match: Erin Burns (New South Wales)

- Western Australia won the toss and elected to field.
- New South Wales innings curtailed at 32.5 overs due to rain.
- Western Australia innings reduced to 32 overs due to rain; target was 222.
- Points: New South Wales 4, Western Australia 0

Match 8
1 October 2022
09:30
Scorecard

(home team) Queensland; 270/4 (47 overs)	v	Australian Capital Territory; 106/6 (20.4 overs)
Laura Harris 101 (54); Carly Leeson 2/58 (10 overs)		Annie Wikman 28* (28); Courtney Sippel 2/24 (4 overs)

Queensland won by 47 runs (DLS method)
Bill Pippen Oval, Gold Coast
Umpires: Benny Farrell and T Logan
Player of the match: Laura Harris (Queensland)

- Australian Capital Territory won the toss and elected to field.
- Queensland innings curtailed at 47 overs due to rain.
- Australian Capital Territory innings curtailed at 20.4 overs due to rain; DLS par score was 153.
- Points: Queensland 5, Australian Capital Territory 0

Match 9
2 October 2022
10:00
Scorecard

(home team) New South Wales; 302/7 (50 overs)	v	Western Australia; 244 (48 overs)
Phoebe Litchfield 107 (105); Amy Edgar 2/36 (7 overs)		Chloe Piparo 55 (71); Maitlan Brown 3/60 (9 overs)

New South Wales won by 58 runs
North Sydney Oval, North Sydney
Umpires: Andrew Hamilton and Daniel Moran
Player of the match: Phoebe Litchfield (New South Wales)

- Western Australia won the toss and elected to field.
- Points: New South Wales 4, Western Australia 0

Match 10
3 October 2022
09:30
Scorecard

Australian Capital Territory; 132 (37.4 overs)	v	Queensland (home team); 133/2 (23.4 overs)
Holly Ferling 22* (45); Jess Jonassen 2/5 (7 overs)		Georgia Redmayne 62* (68); Annie Wikman 1/14 (2.4 overs)

Queensland won by 8 wickets
Bill Pippen Oval, Gold Coast
Umpires: Joshua Adie and M Mellifont
Player of the match: Georgia Redmayne (Queensland)

- Queensland won the toss and elected to field.
- Points: Queensland 5, Australian Capital Territory 0

Match 11
4 October 2022
10:00
Scorecard

(home team) Victoria; 279/8 (50 overs)	v	Tasmania; 280/5 (47.5 overs)
Annabel Sutherland 111 (114); Heather Graham 4/69 (10 overs)		Nicola Carey 101* (83); Kim Garth 2/50 (8.5 overs)

Tasmania won by 5 wickets
CitiPower Centre, St Kilda
Umpires: Chris Grant and Lisa McCabe
Player of the match: Nicola Carey (Tasmania)

- Tasmania won the toss and elected to field.
- Points: Tasmania 4, Victoria 0

Match 12
6 October 2022
10:00
Scorecard

(home team) Victoria; 281/9 (50 overs)	v	Tasmania; 235 (43.5 overs)
Sophie Molineux 113 (116); Sasha Moloney 3/29 (10 overs)		Elyse Villani 73 (89); Sophie Day 5/41 (10 overs)

Victoria won by 46 runs
CitiPower Centre, St Kilda
Umpires: Gaurav Bawa and Lisa McCabe
Player of the match: Sophie Molineux (Victoria)

- Tasmania won the toss and elected to field.
- Points: Victoria 4, Tasmania 0

=== Round 2 ===
Match 13
18 December 2022
10:00
Scorecard

South Australia; 322/3 (50 overs)	v	Australian Capital Territory (home team); 224 (44.2 overs)
Madeline Penna 98* (94); Chloe Rafferty 1/38 (6 overs)		Katie Mack 79 (95); Jemma Barsby 3/32 (7 overs)

South Australia won by 98 runs
Manuka Oval, Canberra
Umpires: Andrew Scotford and Doug Toyne
Player of the match: Madeline Penna (South Australia)

- South Australia won the toss and elected to bat.
- Points: South Australia 5, Australian Capital Territory 0

Match 14
18 December 2022
10:30
Scorecard

New South Wales; 129 (39.1 overs)	v	Tasmania (home team); 131/0 (21 overs)
Claire Moore 29 (55); Molly Strano 4/15 (8.1 overs)		Lizelle Lee 70* (69)

Tasmania won by 10 wickets
Blundstone Arena, Hobart
Umpires: Craig Seabourne and Simon Burns
Player of the match: Molly Strano (Tasmania)

- Tasmania won the toss and elected to field.
- Points: Tasmania 5, New South Wales 0

20 December 2022
10:00
Scorecard

South Australia; 5/298 (50 overs)	v	Australian Capital Territory (home team); 8/230 (50 overs)
Emma de Broughe 112 (123); Amy Yates 2/51 (10 overs)		Annie Wikman 63 (78); Samantha Betts 3/34 (9 overs)

South Australia won by 68 runs
Manuka Oval, Canberra
Umpires: Andrew Scotford and Doug Toyne
Player of the match: Emma de Broughe (South Australia)

- South Australia won the toss and elected to bat.
- Points: South Australia 5, Australian Capital Territory 0

Match 16
20 December 2022
14:00 (D/N)
Scorecard

New South Wales; 226 (50 overs)	v	Tasmania (home team); 229/3 (37.3 overs)
Claire Moore 60 (96); Sarah Coyte 5/30 (10 overs)		Emma Manix-Geeves 76* (102); Sammy-Jo Johnson 2/40 (8.3 overs)

Tasmania won by 7 wickets
Blundstone Arena, Hobart
Umpires: Greg Beechey and Simon Burns
Player of the match: Sarah Coyte (Tasmania)

- New South Wales won the toss and elected to bat.
- Points: Tasmania 5, New South Wales 0

Match 17
21 December 2022
14:00 (D/N)
Scorecard

Queensland; 146 (35 overs)	v	Western Australia (home team); 148/0 (24.2 overs)
Georgia Voll 38 (57); Lilly Mills 5/36 (9 overs)		Chloe Piparo 64* (69)

Western Australia won by 10 wickets
WACA Ground, Perth
Umpires: Ashlee Gibbons and Jamie Thomas
Player of the match: Lilly Mills (Western Australia)

- Queensland won the toss and elected to bat.
- Points: Western Australia 5, Queensland 0

Match 18
23 December 2022
14:00 (D/N)
Scorecard

(home team) Western Australia; 222 (48.1 overs)	v	Queensland; 226/4 (41 overs)
Mathilda Carmichael 53 (69); Georgia Prestwidge 3/39 (10 overs)		Laura Harris 60* (23); Lilly Mills 2/57 (9 overs)

Queensland won by 6 wickets
WACA Ground, Perth
Umpires: Jamie Thomas and Jarryd Buscall
Player of the match: Laura Harris (Queensland)

- Western Australia won the toss and elected to bat.
- Points: Queensland 4, Western Australia 0

=== Round 3 ===
Match 19
4 January 2023
10:00
Scorecard

Tasmania; 212 (43.2 overs)	v	Queensland (home team); 140 (33.2 overs)
Lizelle Lee 40 (35); Grace Parsons 2/25 (10 overs)		Georgia Voll 32 (40); Julia Cavanough 3/12 (5 overs)

Tasmania won by 72 runs
Allan Border Field, Brisbane
Umpires: N James and T Logan
Player of the match: Julia Cavanough (Tasmania)

- Queensland won the toss and elected to field.
- Points: Tasmania 5, Queensland 0

Match 20
4 January 2023
14:00 (D/N)
Scorecard

South Australia; 231/9 (50 overs)	v	Western Australia (home team); 231 (50 overs)
Courtney Webb 54 (60); Taneale Peschel 2/35 (10 overs)		Maddy Darke 45 (65); Jemma Barsby 2/26 (10 overs)

Match Tied (South Australia won the one-over eliminator)
WACA Ground, Perth
Umpires: Ashlee Gibbons and Jarryd Buscall
Player of the match: Amanda-Jade Wellington (South Australia)

- South Australia won the toss and elected to bat.
- Super Over: Western Australia 3/2, South Australia 4/0
- Points: South Australia 4, Western Australia 0

Match 21
5 January 2023
10:00
Scorecard

(home team) Victoria; 321/4 (50 overs)	v	New South Wales; 233/8 (50 overs)
Ellyse Perry 147 (125); Lauren Smith 2/45 (10 overs)		Sammy-Jo Johnson 48 (52); Tess Flintoff 3/32 (7 overs)

Victoria won by 88 runs
CitiPower Centre, St Kilda
Umpires: Daryl Brigham and Gaurav Bawa
Player of the match: Ellyse Perry (Victoria)

- New South Wales won the toss and elected to field.
- Points: Victoria 5, New South Wales 0

Match 22
6 January 2023
10:00
Scorecard

(home team) Queensland; 132 (37.5 overs)	v	Tasmania; 133/3 (17.2 overs)
Mikayla Hinkley 22 (25); Nicola Carey 3/27 (10 overs)		Elyse Villani 57* (48); Nicola Hancock 1/21 (2 overs)

Tasmania won by 7 wickets
Allan Border Field, Brisbane
Umpires: Joshua Adie and T Logan
Player of the match: Elyse Villani (Tasmania)

- Queensland won the toss and elected to bat.
- Points: Tasmania 5, Queensland 0

Match 23
6 January 2023
14:00 (D/N)
Scorecard

South Australia; 297/5 (50 overs)	v	Western Australia (home team); 291/9 (50 overs)
Bridget Patterson 152 (144); Lilly Mills 2/56 (10 overs)		Maddy Darke 133 (142); Anesu Mushangwe 2/46 (8 overs)

South Australia won by 6 runs
WACA Ground, Perth
Umpires: Ashlee Gibbons and Jarryd Buscall
Player of the match: Bridget Patterson (South Australia)

- South Australia won the toss and elected to bat.
- Points: South Australia 4, Western Australia 0

Match 24
7 January 2023
10:00
Scorecard

New South Wales; 283/7 (50 overs)	v	Victoria (home team); 286/3 (38.5 overs)
Phoebe Litchfield 82 (99); Sophie Day 3/36 (7 overs)		Ellyse Perry 130* (95); Lauren Smith 1/40 (5 overs)

Victoria won by 7 wickets
CitiPower Centre, St Kilda
Umpires: Chris Grant and Greg Azzopardi
Player of the match: Ellyse Perry (Victoria)

- New South Wales won the toss and elected to bat.
- Points: Victoria 5, New South Wales 0

=== Round 4 ===
Match 25
17 January 2023
10:00
Scorecard

Victoria; 188/9 (50 overs)	v	Queensland (home team); 189/6 (39.1 overs)
Tiana Atkinson 38 (51); Nicola Hancock 3/42 (9 overs)		Grace Harris 71 (56); Georgia Wareham 4/38 (8.1 overs)

Queensland won by 4 wickets
Ian Healy Oval, Brisbane
Umpires: Benny Farrell and M Mellifont
Player of the match: Grace Harris (Queensland)

- Victoria won the toss and elected to bat.
- Points: Queensland 5, Victoria 0

Match 26
19 January 2023
10:00
Scorecard

(home team) Australian Capital Territory; 261/9 (50 overs)	v	Tasmania; 250 (47.3 overs)
Katie Mack 67 (83); Sarah Coyte 3/49 (10 overs)		Heather Graham 109 (112); Gabby Sutcliffe 4/35 (7.3 overs)

Australian Capital Territory won by 11 runs
EPC Solar Park, Canberra
Umpires: C Cassin and Dinusha Bandara
Player of the match: Heather Graham (Tasmania)

- Tasmania won the toss and elected to field.
- Points: Australian Capital Territory 4, Tasmania 0

Match 27
19 January 2023
10:00
Scorecard

New South Wales; 278 (49.2 overs)	v	South Australia (home team); 280/4 (49.3 overs)
Anika Learoyd 131 (128); Kate Peterson 4/56 (10 overs)		Madeline Penna 113* (115); Lauren Cheatle 1/41 (10 overs)

South Australia won by 6 wickets
Karen Rolton Oval, Adelaide
Umpires: Dhaval Bhatt and K Miegel
Player of the match: Madeline Penna (South Australia)

- New South Wales won the toss and elected to bat.
- Points: New South Wales 4, South Australia 0

Match 28
19 January 2023
10:00
Scorecard

Victoria; 210/8 (50 overs)	v	Queensland (home team); 211/4 (39.2 overs)
Georgia Wareham 67* (88); Grace Parsons 2/29 (10 overs)		Laura Harris 81 (33); Sophie Day 2/23 (5.2 overs)

Queensland won by 6 wickets
Ian Healy Oval, Brisbane
Umpires: Benny Farrell and M Mellifont
Player of the match: Laura Harris (Queensland)

- Victoria won the toss and elected to bat.
- Points: Queensland 5, Victoria 0

Match 29
21 January 2023
10:00
Scorecard

Tasmania; 286/7 (50 overs)	v	Australian Capital Territory (home team); 197 (47 overs)
Nicola Carey 70 (87); Gabby Sutcliffe 2/57 (10 overs)		Katie Mack 63 (66); Sasha Moloney 3/21 (6 overs)

Tasmania won by 89 runs
EPC Solar Park, Canberra
Umpires: Andrew Crozier and Dinusha Bandara
Player of the match: Nicola Carey (Tasmania)

- Australian Capital Territory won the toss and elected to field.
- Points: Tasmania 5, Australian Capital Territory 0

Match 30
21 January 2023
10:00
Scorecard

New South Wales; 270/7 (50 overs)	v	South Australia (home team); 271/4 (47.1 overs)
Anika Learoyd 91 (86); Amanda-Jade Wellington 3/51 (7 overs)		Courtney Webb 101* (103); Anika Learoyd 1/11 (2 overs)

South Australia won by 6 wickets
Karen Rolton Oval, Adelaide
Umpires: Dhaval Bhatt and James Cushway
Player of the match: Courtney Webb (South Australia)

- New South Wales won the toss and elected to bat.
- Points: South Australia 4, New South Wales 0

=== Round 5 ===
Match 31
6 February 2023
10:30
Scorecard

South Australia; 244/6 (50 overs)	v	Tasmania (home team); 246/4 (49 overs)
Courtney Webb 110* (105); Nicola Carey 2/47 (9 overs)		Lizelle Lee 77 (88); Amanda-Jade Wellington 2/53 (10 overs)

Tasmania won by 6 wickets
Blundstone Arena, Hobart
Umpires: G Beechey and Jeremiah Matibiri

- Tasmania won the toss and elected to field.
- Points: Tasmania 4, South Australia 0

Match 32
8 February 2023
10:00
Scorecard

Western Australia; 270/8 (50 overs)	v	Victoria (home team); 243 (48.5 overs)
Chloe Piparo 70 (76); Samantha Bates 2/39 (10 overs)		Rhiann O'Donnell 44 (46); Amy Edgar 3/34 (9.5 overs)

Western Australia won by 27 runs
CitiPower Centre, St Kilda
Umpires: Chris Grant and Lisa McCabe
Player of the match: Chloe Piparo (Western Australia)

- Victoria won the toss and elected to field.
- Points: Western Australia 4, Victoria 0

Match 33
8 February 2023
14:00 (D/N)
Scorecard

South Australia; 224 (48 overs)	v	Tasmania (home team); 225/4 (42.2 overs)
Bridget Patterson 47 (67); Sarah Coyte 4/33 (9 overs)		Elyse Villani 125* (110); Brooke Harris 2/45 (8 overs)

Tasmania won by 6 wickets
Blundstone Arena, Hobart
Umpires: Muhammad Qureshi and Simon Burns
Player of the match: Elyse Villani (Tasmania)

- Tasmania won the toss and elected to field.
- Points: Tasmania 4, South Australia 0

Match 34
10 February 2023
10:00
Scorecard

(home team) New South Wales; 263/9 (50 overs)	v	Australian Capital Territory; 256 (49.3 overs)
Erin Burns 87 (75); Gabby Sutcliffe 3/51 (9 overs)		Zoe Cooke 114 (123); Sammy-Jo Johnson 2/57 (9.3 overs)

New South Wales won by 7 runs
Wade Park, Orange
Umpires: Bede Sajowitz and Daniel Moran
Player of the match: Zoe Cooke (Australian Capital Territory)

- New South Wales won the toss and elected to bat.
- Points: New South Wales 4, Australian Capital Territory 0

Match 35
10 February 2023
10:00
Scorecard

(home team) Victoria; 259/9 (50 overs)	v	Western Australia; 186 (43.4 overs)
Sophie Reid 73 (89); Lilly Mills 3/42 (10 overs)		Mathilda Carmichael 35 (45); Milly Illingworth 4/41 (6.4 overs)

Victoria won by 73 runs
CitiPower Centre, St Kilda
Umpires: Gaurav Bawa and Greg Azzopardi
Player of the match: Sophie Reid (Victoria)

- Victoria won the toss and elected to bat.
- Points: Victoria 5, Western Australia 0

Match 36
12 February 2023
10:00
Scorecard

(home team) New South Wales; 244/6 (50 overs)	v	Australian Capital Territory; 210 (44.4 overs)
Tahlia Wilson 112 (140); Carly Leeson 2/29 (6 overs)		Carly Leeson 63 (91); Lauren Smith 3/40 (10 overs)

New South Wales won by 34 runs
Wade Park, Orange
Umpires: Andrew Hamilton and Roberto Howard
Player of the match: Tahlia Wilson (New South Wales)

- New South Wales won the toss and elected to bat.
- Points: New South Wales 4, Australian Capital Territory 0

Match 37
14 February 2023
10:30
Scorecard

Western Australia; 172 (42.3 overs)	v	Tasmania (home team); 173/1 (24.1 overs)
Chloe Piparo 59 (83); Molly Strano 3/15 (7.3 overs)		Lizelle Lee 106* (77); Piepa Cleary 1/39 (7 overs)

Tasmania won by 9 wickets
Blundstone Arena, Hobart
Umpires: Jeremiah Matibiri and Simon Burns
Player of the match: Lizelle Lee (Tasmania)

- Western Australia won the toss and elected to bat.
- Points: Tasmania 5, Western Australia 0

Match 38
16 February 2023
10:30
Scorecard

Tasmania; 339/3 (50 overs)	v	Western Australia; 308/9 (50 overs)
Elyse Villani 174* (149); Ashlee King 3/62 (10 overs)		Maddy Darke 70 (77); Sasha Moloney 2/39 (6 overs)

Tasmania won by 31 runs
Blundstone Arena, Hobart
Umpires: Craig Seabourne and Muhammad Qureshi
Player of the match: Elyse Villani (Tasmania)

- Western Australia won the toss and elected to field.
- Points: Tasmania 4, Western Australia 0

Match 39
17 February 2023
10:00
Scorecard

Victoria; 193 (50 overs)	v	Australian Capital Territory (home team); 194/6 (46.3 overs)
Sophie Reid 48 (93); Carly Leeson 2/24 (10 overs)		Rebecca Carter 50 (94); Sophie Day 3/35 (10 overs)

Australian Capital Territory won by 4 wickets
EPC Solar Park, Canberra
Umpires: Chris Cassin and Dinusha Bandara
Player of the match: Rebecca Carter (Australian Capital Territory)

- Victoria won the toss and elected to bat.
- Points: Australian Capital Territory 4, Victoria 0

Match 40
17 February 2023
10:00
Scorecard

(home team) South Australia; 234 (48.4 overs)	v	Queensland; 140 (28.3 overs)
Courtney Webb 74 (73); Grace Parsons 4/40 (10 overs)		Laura Harris 36 (17); Kate Peterson 5/34 (7.3 overs)

South Australia won by 94 runs
Karen Rolton Oval, Adelaide
Umpires: Dhaval Bhatt and Harry Singh
Player of the match: Kate Peterson (South Australia)

- Queensland won the toss and elected to field.
- Points: South Australia 5, Queensland 0

Match 41
19 February 2023
10:00
Scorecard

Victoria; 229/7 (50 overs)	v	Australian Capital Territory; 200 (46 overs)
Tess Flintoff 58 (62); Jannatul Ferdus 3/40 (10 overs)		Rebecca Carter 50 (87); Tess Flintoff 3/36 (10 overs); Sam Bates 3/36 (10 overs)

Victoria won by 29 runs
EPC Solar Park, Canberra
Umpires: Andrew Crozier and Dinusha Bandara
Player of the match: Tess Flintoff (Victoria)

- Victoria won the toss and elected to bat.
- Points: Victoria 4, Australian Capital Territory 0

Match 42
19 February 2023
10:00
Scorecard

Queensland; 223 (46.5 overs)	v	South Australia; 226/7 (49.2 overs)
Laura Harris 50 (27); Jemma Barsby 3/30 (9.5 overs)		Emma de Broughe 70 (116); Grace Parsons 2/32 (10 overs)

South Australia won by 3 wickets
Karen Rolton Oval, Adelaide
Umpires: Harry Singh and K Miegel
Player of the match: Jemma Barsby (South Australia)

- South Australia won the toss and elected to field.
- Points: South Australia 4, Queensland 0

== Final ==
Final
25 February 2023
14:05 (D/N)
Scorecard

Tasmania; 264 (50 overs)	v	South Australia; 241 (47 overs)
Elyse Villani 110 (126); Anesu Mushangwe 4/38 (10 overs)		Courtney Webb 83 (107); Sarah Coyte 4/30 (8 overs)

Tasmania won by 1 run (DLS method)
Bellerive Oval, Hobart
Umpires: Andrew Crozier and Stephen Dionysius
Player of the match: Sarah Coyte (Tasmania)

- South Australia won the toss and elected to field.
- South Australia innings reduced to 47 overs due to rain; target was 243.

== Statistics ==
=== Highest totals ===
Team	Score	Against	Venue	Date
Tasmania	3/339	Western Australia	Bellerive Oval	16 February 2023
South Australia	3/322	Australian Capital Territory	Manuka Oval	18 December 2022
Victoria	4/321	New South Wales	Junction Oval	5 January 2023
Western Australia	9/308	Tasmania	Bellerive Oval	16 February 2023
Queensland	9/307	New South Wales	North Sydney Oval	23 September 2022

=== Most runs ===
Player	Team	Mat	Inns	NO	Runs	HS	Ave	BF	SR	100	50
Elyse Villani	Tasmania	13	13	4	705	174*	78.33	764	92.27	3	3
Courtney Webb	South Australia	13	13	2	594	110*	54.50	698	85.10	2	4
Lizelle Lee	Tasmania	13	13	2	559	106*	50.81	559	100.00	1	4
Emma de Broughe	South Australia	13	13	0	554	112	42.61	841	65.87	1	4
Chloe Piparo	Western Australia	12	12	2	513	75*	51.30	629	81.55	0	6

=== Most wickets ===
Player	Team	Mat	Inns	Overs	Mdns	Runs	Wkts	BBI	Ave	SR	4WI
Sarah Coyte	Tasmania	13	13	108.5	9	467	30	5/30	15.56	21.7	3
Sophie Day	Victoria	12	12	87.2	2	395	24	5/41	16.45	21.8	1
Molly Strano	Tasmania	13	13	109.0	6	492	22	4/15	22.36	29.7	1
Amanda-Jade Wellington	South Australia	11	11	93.2	0	533	22	4/49	24.22	25.4	1
Lilly Mills	Western Australia	12	12	101.0	5	498	20	5/36	24.90	30.3	1
