= Tianna (disambiguation) =

Tianna is a variant of the given name Tiana.

Tianna may also refer to:

- Tianna Falls, North Ayrshire, Scotland
- European rendering of the name Kaʻiana (1755–1795), kanaka warrior
