= Madison Albers =

Australian cricketer

Personal information
- Full name: Madison Albers
- Batting: Right-handed
- Bowling: Right-arm medium
- Role: Bowler

Domestic team information
- Years: Team
- 2022/23: Victoria

Career statistics
Competition	WLA
Matches	2
Runs scored	0
Batting average	–
100s/50s	0/0
Top score	0*
Balls bowled	72
Wickets	1
Bowling average	47.00
5 wickets in innings	0
10 wickets in match	0
Best bowling	1/24
Catches/stumpings	1/–
- Source: CricketArchive, 19 January 2023

Madison Albers is an Australian cricketer who last played for Victoria in the Women's National Cricket League (WNCL). She plays as a right-arm medium bowler.

== Domestic career ==
Albers plays grade cricket for Carlton Cricket Club.

In the summer of 2022, Albers took part in Renegades Recruit, a reality television show run by Melbourne Renegades to uncover new cricketing talent. In January 2023, Albers made her debut for Victoria, taking 1/24 from six overs against Queensland in the Women's National Cricket League.
