= Teodora =

- Gender: female

Origin
- Origin: Greek
- Meaning: "gift of God"

Other names
- Related names: Theodora, Dorothy

Teodora (Cyrillic: Теодора) is a feminine given name, a variation of the name Theodora.

Notable people with the name include:

- Teodora Albon (born 1977), Romanian football referee
- Teodora Aleksandrova (born 2001), Bulgarian rhythmic gymnast
- Teodora Alexandrova (born 1981), Bulgarian individual rhythmic gymnast
- Teodora Alonso Realonda (1827–1911), mother of the Philippines' national hero José Rizal
- Teodora Andreeva (born 1987), Bulgarian pop-folk singer
- Teodora Betcheva (born 1971), Bulgarian volleyball player
- Teodora Branković (14th century), Serbian noblewoman and Princess consort of Albania
- Teodora Danti (1498–1573), Italian painter
- Teodora Dimoska (born 2000), Macedonian footballer
- Teodora Drăgoescu (born 1986), Romanian footballer
- Teodora Duhovnikova (born 1977), Bulgarian actress
- Teodora Džehverović (born 1997), Serbian singer
- Teodora Fracasso (1901–1927), Italian Catholic nun
- Teodora Genchovska (born 1971), Bulgarian politician
- Teodora Gheorghiu (born 1978), Romanian soprano
- Teodora Gîdoiu (born 1986), Romanian rower
- Teodora Ginés, (1530–1598), Dominican musician and composer
- Teodora Gjorgjevska (born 2000), Macedonian footballer
- Teodora Injac (born 2000), Serbian chess player
- Teodora Jankovska (born 2002), Macedonian footballer
- Teodora Kolarova (born 1981), Bulgarian middle distance runner
- Teodora Kostovic (born 2007), Serbian tennis player
- Teodora Malcheva (born 1983), Bulgarian cross country skier
- Teodora Măgurean (born 1998), Romanian handball player
- Teodora Matejko (1846–1896), The wife of Polish painter Jan Matejko
- Teodora Meluță (born 1999), Romanian footballer
- Teodora Mirčić (born 1988), Serbian tennis player
- Teodora Nedeva (born 1977), Bulgarian tennis player
- Teodora Pentcheva (born 1982), Bulgarian snowboarder
- Teodora Poštič (born 1984), Slovenian figure skater
- Teodora Pušić (born 1993), Serbian volleyball player
- Teodora Ruano (born 1969), Spanish cyclist
- Teodora Sava (born 2001), Romanian singer
- Teodora Simović (born 1993), Serbian athlete
- Teodora Ungureanu (born 1960), Romanian gymnast
- Teodora Zareva (born 1963), Bulgarian rower

== See also ==
- Theodora (disambiguation)
- Doña Teodora Alonzo High School in Manila, Philippines
- St. Teodora de la Sihla Church, cathedral in Central Chişinău, Moldova
- Dora (given name)
- Tea (given name)
