= Talvitie =

Talvitie is a Finnish surname. Notable people with the surname include:

- Heikki Talvitie (born 1939), Finnish diplomat
- Helge Talvitie (born 1941), Finnish politician
- Mari-Leena Talvitie, Finnish politician
- Pentti Talvitie (1922–2003), Finnish diplomat
- Tiia-Maria Talvitie (born 1994), Finnish biathlete
- Virpi Talvitie (born 1961), Finnish illustrator and graphic artist
