= TLA =

TLA may refer to:

== Organisations ==
- Tennessee Library Association, a professional organization for librarians in Tennessee
- Texas Library Association, a professional organization for librarians in Texas
- Tour de las Américas, a professional golf tour in Latin America
- The Littlehampton Academy, a school in Sussex, England

=== Entertainment ===
- Theatre of Living Arts, a music venue in Philadelphia, Pennsylvania. US
- TLA Entertainment Group, a movie retailer and distributor spinoff from the former
  - TLA Releasing, its film distribution division
- Avatar: The Last Airbender, an animated TV series that aired on Nickelodeon from 2005 to 2008

== Places ==
- Teller Airport (IATA code), Alaska, US
- Tlaxcala (ISO 3166-2:MX code MX-TLA), a Mexican state

== Science and technology ==
- Temporal light artefacts, undesired visual effects caused by light modulations
- Temporal logic of actions, a logic used to describe behaviours of concurrent systems
- Top-level await, an async/await language feature for JavaScript
- Tom Lord's Arch, a revision control system now known as GNU arch

== Other uses ==
- Three-letter acronym or abbreviation
- Teaching & Learning Academy, an English teacher training programme
- Southwestern Tepehuán language (ISO 639-3 code), from North-Western Mexico

== See also ==
- TLA^{+}, a formal specification language written in Java
- T1A (disambiguation)
- TIA (disambiguation)
