= T1A =

T1A may refer to:

== Places ==
- Line T1a (Oslo Metro), Oslo, Norway
- T1A (postal code); see List of postal codes of Canada: T

== Products ==
- BAe Hawk T1A, jet trainer
- Eurofighter Typhoon T1A, jet fighter; see Eurofighter Typhoon variants

== Other uses ==
- iodothyronamine (T_{1}a), a thyroid hormone

== See also ==
- TLA (disambiguation)
- TIA (disambiguation)
