= Tias =

TIAS or Tias can refer to:

== Places ==
- Tías, Las Palmas, a municipality in the Canary Islands of Spain in the Atlantic

== People ==
- Tias Eckhoff (1926–2016), Norwegian industrial designer
- Tias Mortigjija (1913–1947), Croatian journalist

== Groups, companies, organizations ==
- Taoyuan International Airport Services Limited, Taiwan, provides ground handling
- Tecnia Institute of Advanced Studies, Delhi, India, a college
- TIAS School for Business and Society, a leading business school in the Netherlands
- TIAS.com ("The Internet Antique Store"), American marketplace for antiques and collectibles

== Other uses ==
- Treaties and Other International Acts Series published by the United States Department of State

== See also ==
- TIA (disambiguation)
