= Tuya (queen) =

- Queen consort of ancient Egypt; Great Royal Wife
- King's Mother Tuya
- Born: Thebes
- Died: c. 1257 BC; Thebes
- Burial: QV80, Valley of the Queens, Thebes
- Spouse: Seti I
- Issue: Tia; Ramesses II; Henutmire (possibly)
Names
- Tuya or Mut-Tuya
Egyptian name
t w i A B7
- Dynasty: 19th of Egypt
- Father: Raia
- Mother: [R]uia or [T]uia
- Religion: Ancient Egyptian religion

Tuya (also called Tuy or more rarely Mut-Tuya or Muty; in transliteration from hieroglyphic, Twy, Twjȝ, or Twyȝ, as well as Mwt-Twjȝ,; in cuneiform texts from the Hittite correspondence, Tūya, ^{SAL}Tu-u-ia.), meaning "the admirable one" or "one who is admirable", was the wife of Pharaoh Seti I of the Nineteenth Dynasty of Egypt and mother of Tia, Ramesses II, and possibly Henutmire. (Note: For the view that Henutmire was Ramesses II's sister and wife, which used to be prevalent, see Kitchen 1982: 98; Dodson & Hilton 2004: 164, 170; much of recent scholarship has concluded that Henutmire was Ramesses II's daughter and wife: e.g., Leblanc 1999: 244-253; Grajetzki 2005: 70-71; Obsomer 2012: 229-230.)

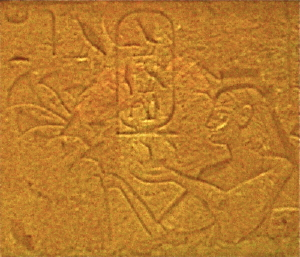
Relief of Tuya, Royal Ontario Museum

She was the daughter of Raia (Rʿjȝ), Lieutenant in the Chariotry, by his wife Ruya or Tuya (the name is partly broken: [R/T]wjȝ). Seti I and Tuya's daughter Tia (Ṯjȝ) was married to a high-ranking civil servant who was also called Tia (Ṯjȝ), the son of Amenwahsu (Jmn-wȝḥ-sw). The vast majority of Tuya's attestations as queen date to the reign of her son, making it less than completely certain that she bore the title of King's Great Wife during the reign of her husband. On the other hand, as mother of king's only known son, she might well have become Seti's chief queen, unlike another spouse, the royal daughter Tanodjmy. (Note: Mladjov 2014: 63, 65, 67. Seti's chief queen seems to be designated obliquely as "The King's Wife" (tȝ-ḥmt-nsw), the description replacing her name inside the cartouche: Obsomer 2012: 219; Kitchen 1975 (Ramesside Inscriptions I), 265:6 and 279: 6.) (Note: However, Tanodjmy was buried in the Valley of the Queens and explicitly held the title of "Mistress of Upper and Lower Egypt." She was the only wife of Seti I, other than Tuya, to be interred there. Her tomb suffered severe damage. Considering that Iset Ta-Hemdjert—Great Royal Wife of Ramses III and mother of Ramses VI—also lacked documented evidence of the "Great Royal Wife" title in her tomb, Tanodjmy was likely a Great Royal Wife herself. Similar to Queen Iset Ta-Hemdjert, this title may have been destroyed and thus failed to survive. Nevertheless, Tanodjmy’s tomb was a prefabricated structure intended for a queen with specific royal filiation, rather than being specially customized for her personally. It is also possible that she was posthumously granted these titles.)

It is worth noting that Tuya is called King's Ornament (ḫkr.t-nswt) in the Ramesseum. The meaning of this title is similar to that of a court lady-in-waiting. Obsomer believes that, since according to Troy's compilation this title was no longer held by queens after the Eleventh Dynasty, Tuya's title was very likely in fact "mistress of the King's Ornaments" (ḥnwt ḫkr.t-nswt), the first part of which is broken off and has not survived. However, Queen Tiye of the Eighteenth Dynasty very clearly held this title; (Note: The conferral upon Tiye of the title of the court lady responsible for entertaining the pharaoh through song and dance is, in Duhard’s view, surprising. She became queen at an extremely young age, leaving no period in which she could have been old enough to be granted this title while still not yet having become queen. This makes it difficult to explain the existence of the title by assuming that she possessed it before her marriage to the pharaoh and retained it after the marriage. Perhaps it was intended to emphasize the queen’s sexual allure, with her role being to awaken the pharaoh’s senses. Yet Tiye had other, more appropriate titles expressing this function. Alternatively, it may simply be that the queen inherited her own mother’s title, along with the fixed income associated with that title.) therefore Tuya was very likely also a King's Ornament. In Tuya's case, this was probably a title she held during the reign of Horemheb and retained honorifically thereafter. Although during the reign of Seti I it cannot be proven that Tuya held any title, at least this title should have continued to belong to her.

As the mother of Ramesses II, Tuya enjoyed a privileged existence of a respected king's mother. Ramesses dedicated a monumental structure within his mortuary temple, the Ramesseum, to his mother, and also constructed a fine new tomb for her in the section of the Valley of the Queens that he developed for the burials of the women in his family. Following the peace treaty between Egypt and Hatti in Year 21 of Ramesses II (1259 BC according to the "Low Chronology"), Tuya sent congratulatory letters to the Hittite great king Ḫattušili III and to his queen Puduḫepa, who she addressed as her symbolic "brother" and "sister", respectively. However, by the time of the inauguration of Ramesses II's temple at Abu Simbel in Year 24 (1256 BC), Tuya appears to have been dead.

== Monuments and inscriptions ==
- Statue, Vatican Museum no. 28 with figure of Henutmire. The inscription identifies Queen Tuya as: Mother of the King of South and North Egypt, Queen Mother of the King of South and North Egypt (even of) the Horus-Falcon, Strong Bull, Lord of Both Lands, Usermaatre Setepenre, Lord of Crowns, Ramesses II, given life like Re; The God's Wife and Great Royal Wife, Lady of Both Lands, Tuya, may she live.
- At the Ramesseum, fragments of North Side-Chapel of Queen Mother Tuya were found. Ramesses II had this chapel dedicated to his mother. A scene in this chapel records the name of Tuya's father and mother.
- The Ramesseum contains scenes of the Divine Birth of the Pharaoh.
- A statue and base block, found in Tanis but originally from Piramesse. Her titles are given as Hereditary Princess, Chief of the Harem, greatly favoured, God's Wife and Queen Mother, Great Royal Wife, etc.
- In Abydos Tuya's name appears on fragments of a limestone statue and in texts in Ramesses II's temple.
- In the Ramesseum Tuya's name appears on fragments of a colossus and in scenes on the main (central) doorway into the great hypostyle hall.
- A statue inscribed with the name and titles of Tuya was found at Medinet Habu, but likely originated from the Ramesseum.
- Queen Tuya appears on two of the collosi flanking the entrance to the temple at Abu Simbel.
- A sandstone lintel from Deir el-Medina records the names of Ramesses II and Tuya.
- A jamb now in Vienna (Inv. 5091) shows Ramesses II followed by Tuya, making an offering to Osiris.
- A carved alabaster canopic jar stopper in the form of her head, today resides in the collection of the Luxor Museum.
- ̈Stela found at Kafr el-Gebel (3 km south of Giza), showing her together with the overseer of the treasury Tia and his wife Tia (a daughter of Tuya).

== Death and burial ==
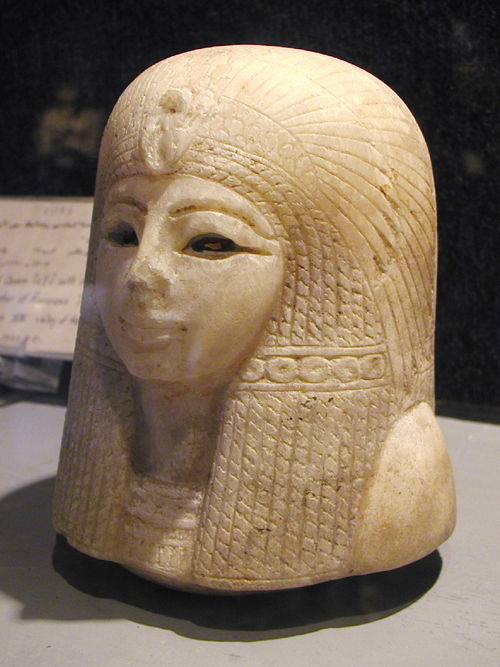
Canopic jar lid of Queen Tuya from the Luxor Museum

Tuya likely died in or soon after Year 22 of Ramesses' reign and was buried in an impressive tomb on the north side of the main wadi of the Valley of the Queens (QV80). (Note: Kitchen 1982: 97; Grajetzki 2005: 66-67. It is possible that a tomb on the south side of the main wadi of the Valley of the Queens, intended for a King's Great Wife but apparently left unused, QV31, was meant for Tuya during her husband's reign: Mladjov 2014: 59. However, according to Leblanc, QV 31 was also constructed for a royal woman holding the title of "King's Daughter." Like all prefabricated tombs in the Valley of the Queens, it was built for a royal female with specific royal filiation: McCarthy 2011: 10) In her tomb, Tuya "was stripped of the first part of her name to become plain Tuya for eternity; the loss of the prefix Mut- suggests that her death had ended in an almost divine earthly status."

== In popular culture ==
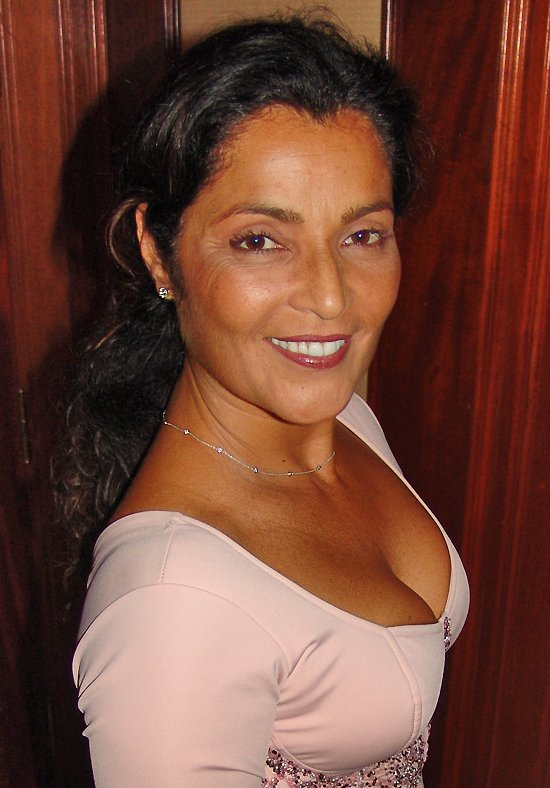
Angelina Muniz played Tuya in television series Os Dez Mandamentos

Because the Pharaoh of the Exodus is popularly identified as Ramses II, Tuya often appears in adaptations of the Book of Exodus:

Queen Tuya has been first portrayed by actress Irene Martin in Cecil B. DeMille's The Ten Commandments, as one of Bithiah's maidservants famous for quoting "Bithiah could charm tears from a crocodile."

In The Prince of Egypt she is the loving adoptive mother of Moses, voiced by Helen Mirren. However, she is only credited as "The Queen".

She is portrayed by Sigourney Weaver in the 2014 Ridley Scott film Exodus: Gods and Kings.

In 2015, in the Brazilian television series Os Dez Mandamentos, Queen Tuya is played by actress Angelina Muniz.

== Gallery ==
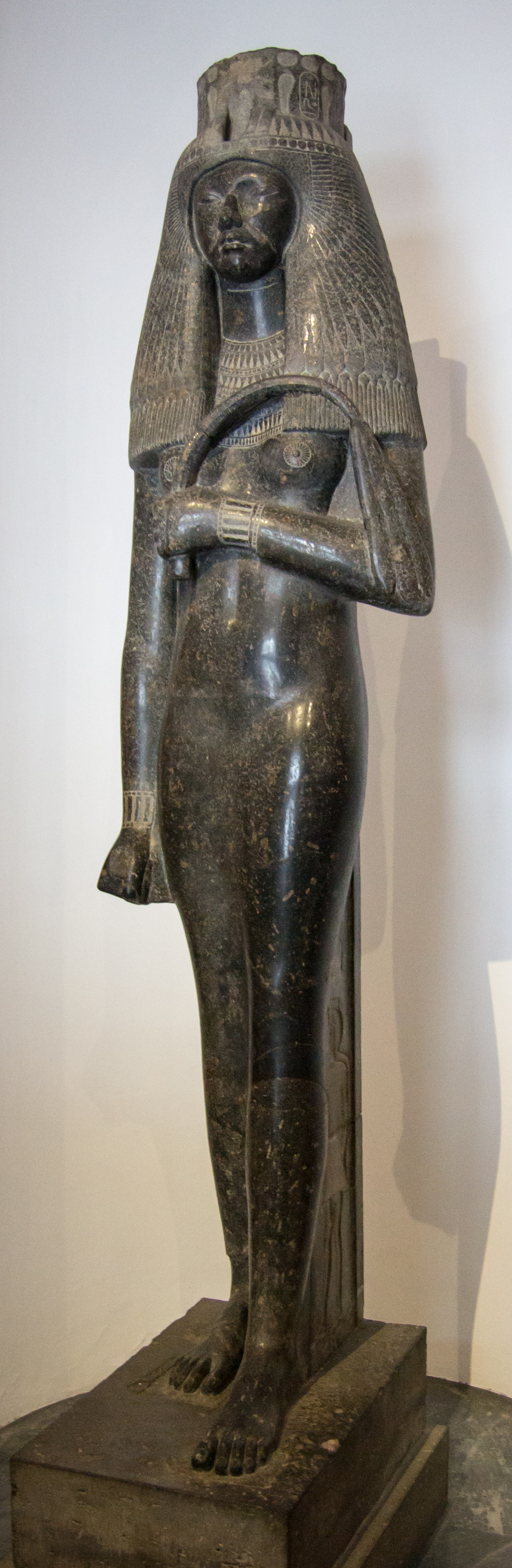
Statue of Tuya from the Vatican

Double statue of the gods Amun and Mut, with the features of Seti I and Tuya, respectively, Luxor Museum

Statue of Tuya from the Egyptian Museum, Cairo

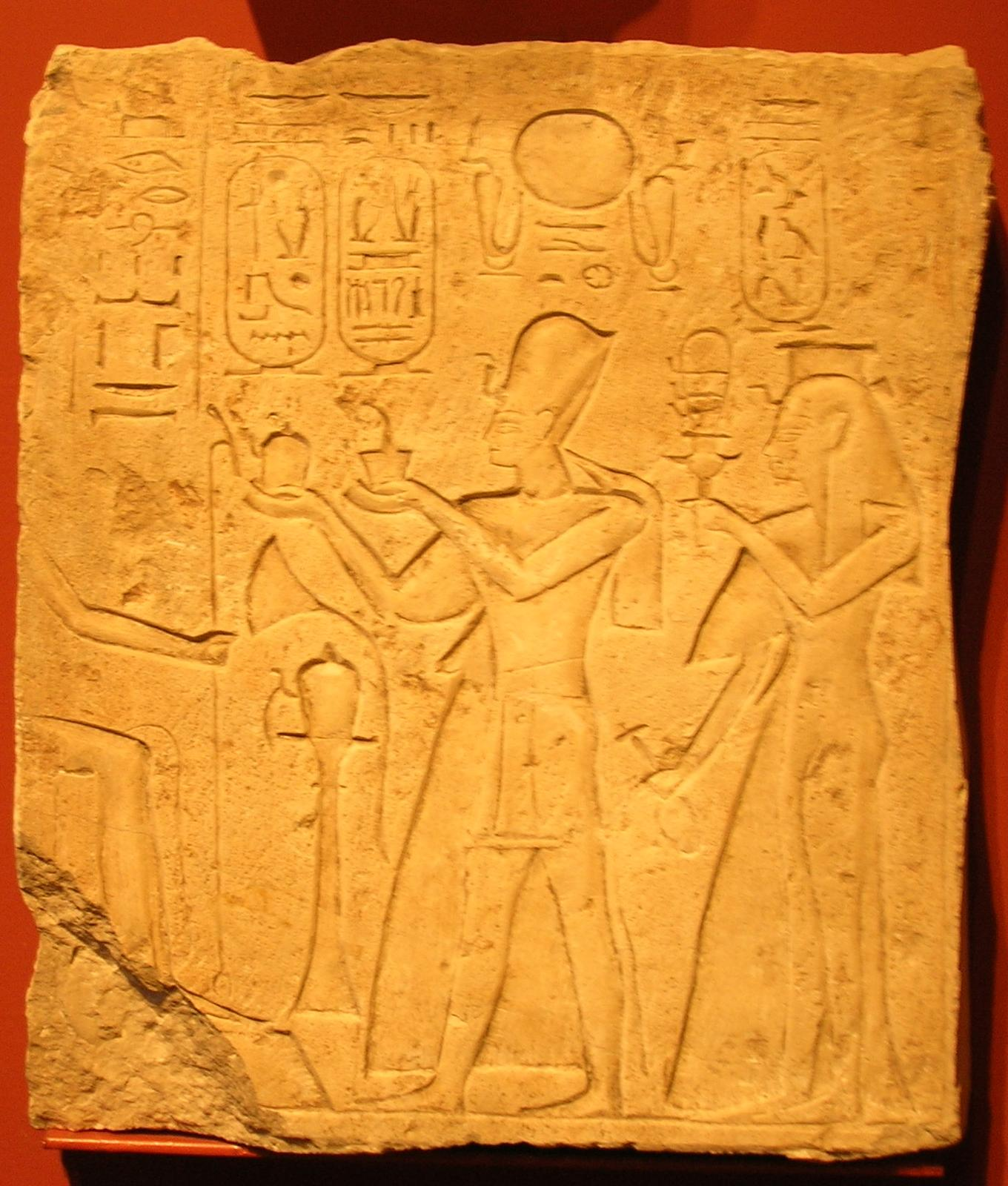
Relief of Tuya with her son Ramesses II, Kunsthistorisches Museum

== See also ==
- Asiya

== Bibliography ==
- Edel, Elmar, Die ägyptisch-hethitische Korrespondenz aus Boghazköi in babylonischer und hethitischer Sprache, 2 vols., Kleve, 1994.
- Dodson, Aidan, and Dyan Hilton, The Complete Royal Families of Ancient Egypt, London, 2004.
- Gauthier, Henri, Le livre des rois d'Égypte, vol. 3, Cairo, 1913. online
- Grajetzki, Wolfram, Ancient Egyptian Queens: a hieroglyphic dictionary, London, 2005.
- Kitchen, Kenneth A., Ramesside Inscriptions: Historical and Biographical I, Oxford, 1975.
- Kitchen, Kenneth A., Pharaoh Triumphant: the life and times of Ramesses II, Warminster, 1982.
- Mladjov, Ian, "Rediscovering Queen Tanodjmy: A probable link between Dynasties 18 and 19", Göttinger Miszellen 242 (2014) 57-70. online
- Obsomer, Claude, Ramsès II, Paris, 2012.
