= Sophocles Papas =

Greek guitar teacher and publisher (1893–1986)

- Born: 18 December 1893; Sopik, Ottoman Empire
- Died: 26 February 1986 (aged 92) Alexandria, Virginia, U.S.
- Genres: Classical
- Instrument: Classical guitar

Sophocles Papas (18 December 1893 – 26 February 1986) was a Greek classical guitar pedagogue and music publisher.

== Early life ==
Papas was born in Sopik, Ottoman Empire. He was exposed to classical music at an early age by his father, who was a church chanter, a voice teacher, and a casual player of the violin. When Papas was a young teenager, he went to live with an uncle in Cairo. He attended school and studied piano. He also began to study both the mandolin and the guitar.

== Career ==
Papas returned to Greece in 1912, where he fought as an Albanian guerrilla against the Turks in the Balkan Wars. Later, he joined the Hellenic Army and fought in the Greco-Turkish War.

In 1914, Papas moved to the United States and began teaching classical guitar in Washington, D.C. He also taught at American University. The lack of published guitar music led Papas to found the Columbia Music Company. The company still publishes many arrangements and original compositions for the guitar, including a number by Papas's friend Andrés Segovia. Perhaps best known is Papas's Method for the Classic Guitar (494-00194 / CO 300), and his revised edition of Fernando Sor's Sixty Short Pieces for Guitar (vol. I: nos. 1–38, 494-00227 / CO 170a; and vol. II: nos. 39–60, 494-00227 / CO 170b), first published in 1963. Theodore Presser Company acquired Columbia Music Company in 2017. Papas was also a regular contributor to many scholarly music journals, notably Crescendo. In addition, Papas was for several years a member of the Board of Directors of the Guitar Foundation of America.

Some of his better-known pupils include Charlie Byrd, Sharon Isbin, Aaron Shearer, Jim Skinger, Dorothy de Goede, Clare Calahan, John Marlow, Jerry Willard, and the jazz musicians Bill Harris and Alvino Rey. Papas was a lifelong friend of Andrés Segovia, whom he met at Segovia's 1928 debut performance in North America.

== Selected publications ==
Additional publications from the Columbia Music Company include:

- Papas's Bach Album: Fourteen Pieces, by J. S. Bach (Bourrée II, from Suite No. 4 for Cello, BWV 1010; Andante, from the Notebook for Anna Magdalena Bach, BWV App. 131; Minuet, from the Notebook for Anna Magdalena Bach, BWV App. 114; Minuet, from Violin Partita No. 3, BWV 1006; Gavotte, from Gavotte en Rondeau from Violin Partita No. 3, BWV 1006; Gavotte I, from Suite No. 6 for Cello, BWV 1012 (revised by Elisabeth Papas Smith); Gavotte II, from Suite No. 6 for Cello, BWV 1012; Minuet, from the Notebook for Anna Magdalena Bach, BWV App. 115; Minuet III, from Suite in G, BWV 822; Minuet, from the Notebook for Anna Magdalena Bach, BWV App. 132; Gavotte II (Musette), from French Suite No. 3, BWV 808; Prelude, or Little Prelude for Lute, BWV 999; Sarabande, from Violin Partita No. 1, BWV 1002; Bourrée, from Lute Suite No. 1, BWV 996), arranged by Sophocles Papas (494-00213 / CO 169).
- Five Catalan Melodies (El Noy de la Mare, El Testamento de Amelia, Plany, La Filla del Marxant, El Mestre), revised by Sophocles Papas (494-00204 / CO 232).
- Arpeggio Studies, edited and fingered by Sophocles Papas (494-00368 / CO 257).
- Eight Lessons, fingered by Sophocles Papas (494-00189 / CO 160).
- Six Easy Flamenco Variations, arranged by Sophocles Papas (494-00215 / CO 117)

== Bibliography ==
- Elisabeth Papas Smith: Sophocles Papas: The Guitar, His Life (Chapel Hill, N.C.: Columbia Music, 1998)

== See also ==
- Thea E. Smith, Papas' granddaughter and current president of Columbia Music Company.
