= Tiana (given name) =

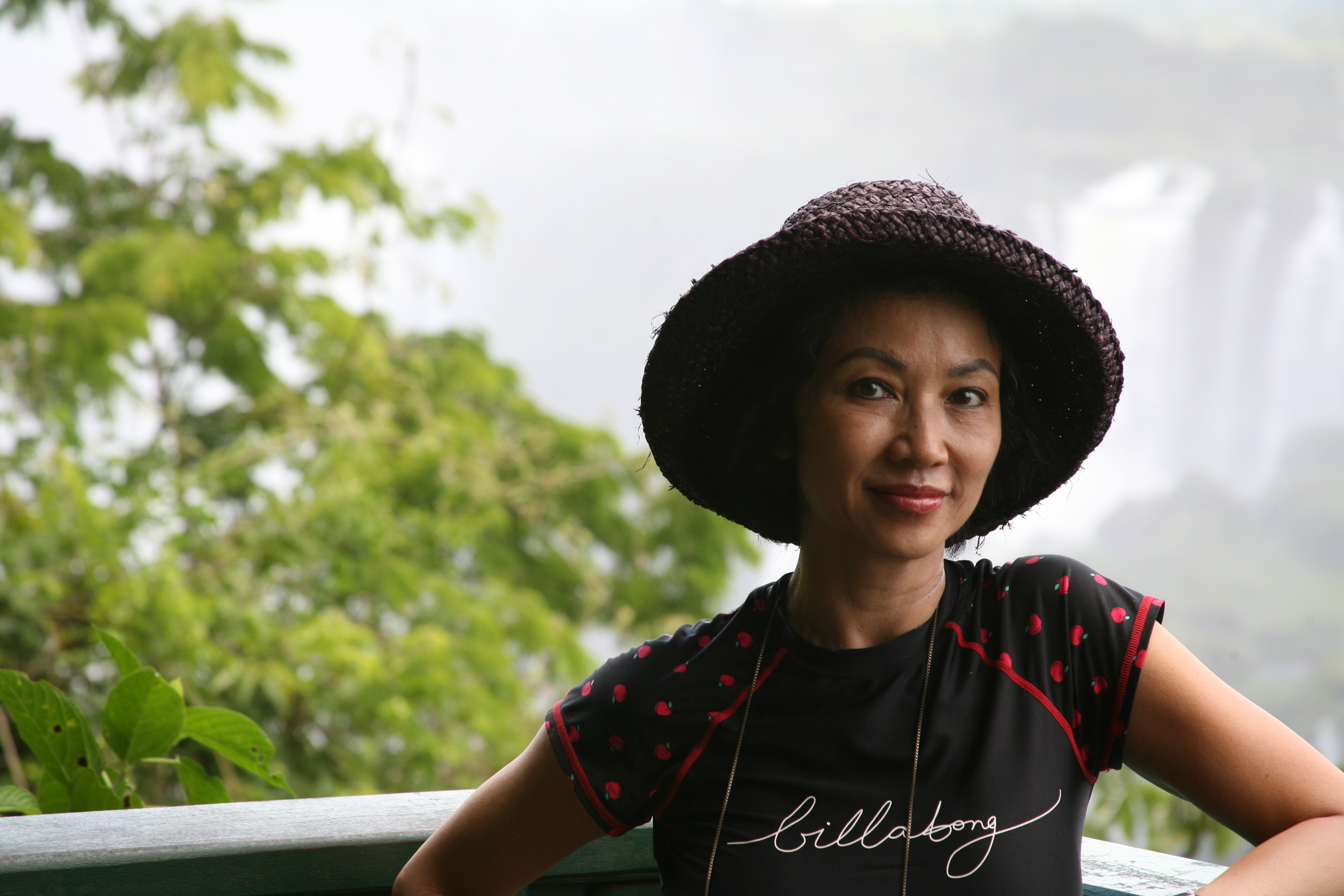
- Actress Tiana Alexandra
- Pronunciation: tee-AHN-ə or tee-ANN-ə
- Gender: Feminine
- Language: Various

Origin
- Meaning: Various

Other names
- Related names: Atiana, Teana, Teanna, Teyana, Teyanna, Teyonah, Teyonna, Tianna, Tiona, Tionna, Tionne, Tyana, Tyanna, Tyonna

Tiana or Tianna is a feminine given name with various origins. It has been used as an extended form of the name Tia or a short form of names such as Cristiana. In the case of Vietnamese-American actress and director Tiana Alexandra, the name was an English spelling of her Vietnamese language given name, Thi Thanh Nga. It is also a Malagasy unisex name meaning loved in use in Madagascar. The name Tiana is common among speakers of Polynesian languages, including Samoan, Māori, Tahitian, and Cook Island Māori as a loan form of the name Diana. Tiana was among the most popular names for Māori girls in New Zealand in 2020. Usage of the name in the United States increased after 1975, which coincided with film and television appearances by Alexandra. Usage of the name also increased after it was used for the main character of the 2009 Disney film The Princess and the Frog.

== Women named Tiana ==
- Tiana Alexandra (born 1956), Vietnamese-American actress and film director
- Tiana Atkinson (born 2002), Australian cricketer
- Tiana Benjamin (born 1984), British actress
- Tiana Brown (born 1981), American dancer
- Tiana Caffey (born 1999), American professional wrestler and former soccer player who performs under the ring name Jaida Parker
- Tiana Clark, American poet
- Tiana Coudray (born 1988), American equestrian and dancer
- Tiana Davison (born 2000), New Zealand professional rugby league footballer
- Justina Tiana Eyakpobeyan (born 2006), Nigerian sprinter
- Tiana Jaber (born 2000), footballer
- Tiana Le, American actress
- Tiana Lemnitz (1897–1994), German operatic soprano
- Tiana Mangakahia (born 1995), Australian basketball player
- Tiana Metuarau (born 2001), British born New Zealand netball player
- Tiana Nobile, American poet
- Tiana Penitani (born 1996), Australian rugby league footballer
- Tiana Rabarijaona (born 1998), Malagasy swimmer
- Tiana Raftstrand-Smith (born 2003), Australian professional rugby league footballer
- Helvy Tiana Rosa (born 1970), Indonesian playwright and writer
- Tiana Sumanasekera (born 2007), American artistic gymnast
- Tiana Thomas-Ambersley (born 1995), British singer known professionally as Tiana Major9
- Tiana Tolstoi (born 1994), Egyptian-born French model of Korean, Serbian, and Russian descent
- Tiana Xiao (born 1990), Chinese-American singer-songwriter

== Women named Tianna ==
- Tianna Bartoletta (born 1985), American track and field athlete
- Tianna Hawkins (born 1991), American professional basketball player

== Women named Teana ==
- Clifeteana "Teana" Miller (born 1980), American former professional basketball player
- Teana Muldrow (born 1995), American professional basketball player

== Women named Teyana ==
- Teyana Taylor (born 1990), American singer, songwriter, actress, model, dancer, choreographer, and music video director

== Women named Teyonah ==
- Teyonah Parris (born 1987), American actress
