= Julia Cavanough =

Australian cricketer

Personal information
- Full name: Julia Cavanough
- Born: 17 March 2004 (age 22)
- Batting: Right-handed
- Bowling: Left-arm medium
- Role: Bowler

Domestic team information
- Years: Team
- 2022/23–present: Tasmania
- 2022/23–present: Hobart Hurricanes

Career statistics
Competition	WLA	WT20
Matches	12	4
Runs scored	37	1
Batting average	16.00	-
100s/50s	0/0	0/0
Top score	16	1*
Balls bowled	390	48
Wickets	7	2
Bowling average	43.14	24.00
5 wickets in innings	0	0
10 wickets in match	0	0
Best bowling	3/12	1/15
Catches/stumpings	4/–	0/–
- Source: CricketArchive, 3 March 2023

Julia Cavanough (born 17 March 2004) is an Australian cricketer who currently plays for Tasmania in the Women's National Cricket League (WNCL) and Hobart Hurricanes in the Women's Big Bash League (WBBL). She plays as a left-arm medium bowler.

== Domestic career ==
In May 2022, Cavanough received her first contract, signing with Tasmania for the upcoming WNCL season. In October 2022, Cavanough was also signed by Hobart Hurricanes for the upcoming WBBL season, although she did not play a match for the side that year. In December 2022, she played for Tasmania in the Cricket Australia Under-19 National Female Championships, and was the side's leading run-scorer, including two half-centuries. On 18 December 2022, Cavanough made her debut for Tasmania's senior team, taking 1/33 from her 7 overs in her side's 10 wicket victory over New South Wales. She went on to play ten matches for the side that season, taking six wickets at an average of 39.50.
