= Rebecca Carter =

Australian cricketer (born 1996)

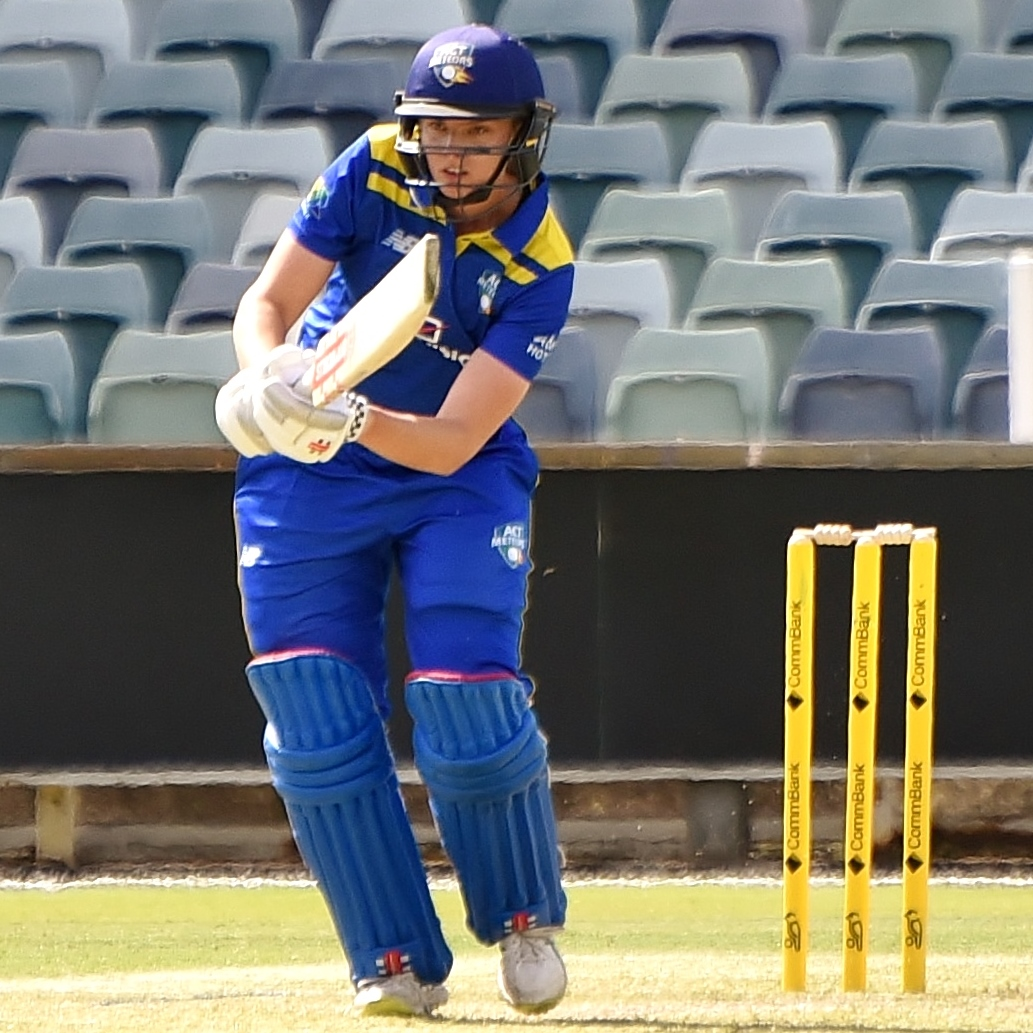
- Carter batting for the ACT in September 2022

Personal information
- Full name: Rebecca Lee Carter
- Born: 16 July 1996 (age 30); Wantirna, Victoria, Australia
- Batting: Left-handed
- Bowling: Right-arm medium
- Role: Batter

Domestic team information
- Years: Team
- 2020/21: Melbourne Renegades
- 2020/21–2023/24: Australian Capital Territory

Career statistics
Competition	List A	Twenty20
Matches	29	1
Runs scored	620	2
Batting average	22.96	2.00
100s/50s	0/3	0/0
Top score	65	2
Catches/stumpings	12/–	0/–
- Source: CricketArchive, 5 October 2025

Rebecca Lee Carter (born 16 July 1996) is an Australian former cricketer who played as a left-handed batter and occasional right-arm medium pace bowler for the ACT Meteors in the Women's National Cricket League (WNCL). She played in one match for Melbourne Renegades in the 2020–21 WBBL season, scoring two runs. She made her WNCL debut in the 2020–21 season, scoring 62 runs in five matches.
