= Theda =

Theda is a feminine given name which may refer to:

- Theda Bara (1885–1955), American silent film actress and sex symbol
- Theda Marshall (1925–2005), player in the All-American Girls Professional Baseball League
- Theda Skocpol (born 1947), American sociologist and political scientist
- Theda Ukena (1432–1494), regent of the County of East Frisia from 1466 to about 1480
- Theda Funnie, fictional character from the animated television series Doug

== See also ==
- Theodosia (disambiguation)
- Theodora (disambiguation)
