= QV80 =

Ancient Egyptian tomb in the Valley of the Queens

- Burial site of (Mut-)Tuya
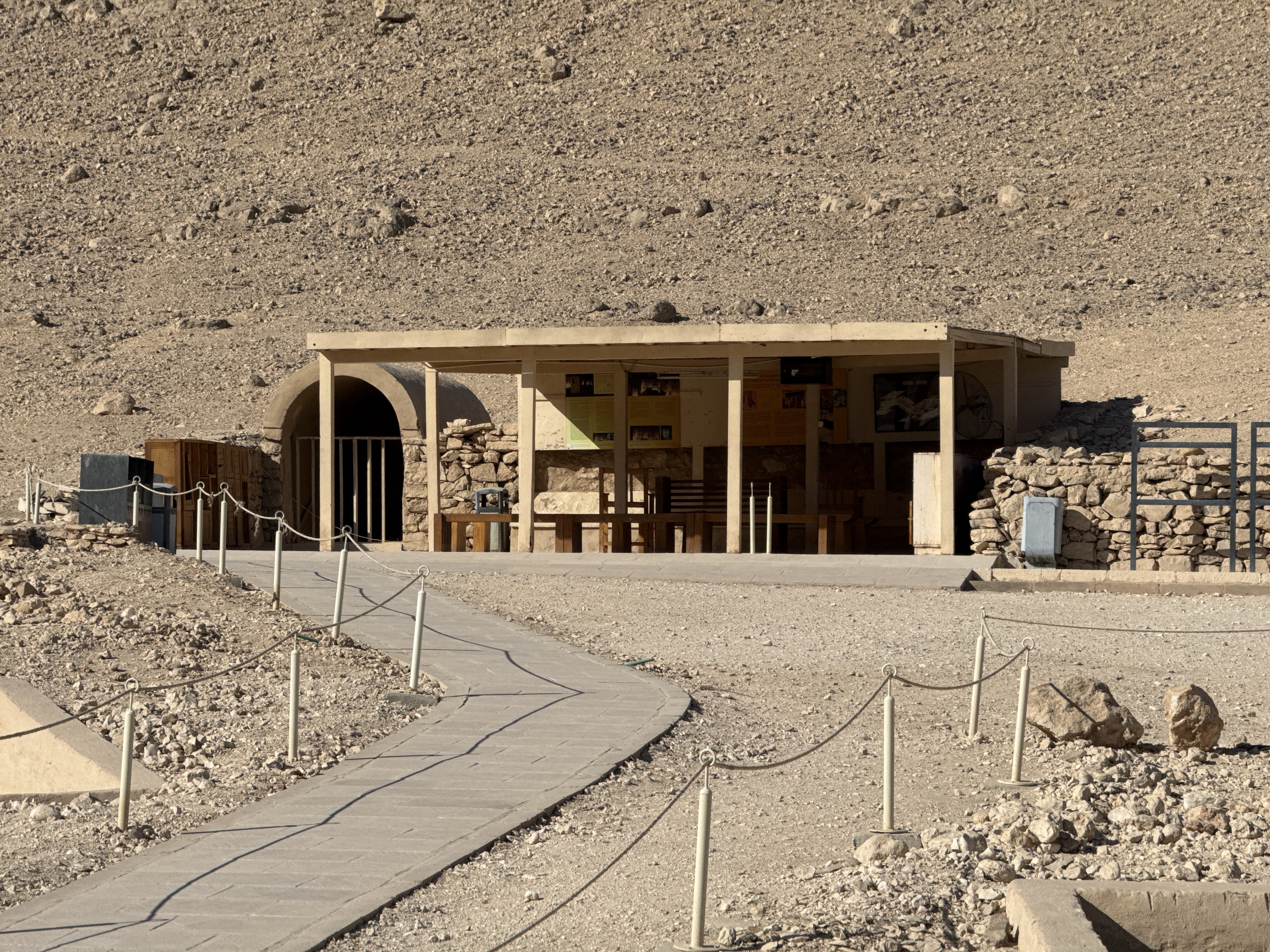

- Location within Egypt
- Location: Valley of the Queens
- Layout: Short corridor, a hall and inner room
- ← Previous; QV79 Next → QV81

QV80 is the tomb of (Mut-)Tuya, the Great Royal Wife of Seti I, and the mother of Ramses II, in Egypt's Valley of the Queens.

Lepsius merely makes mention of this tomb. In his list this is tomb number 7. The tomb is listed as unnumbered in Porter and Moss. A more detailed description is given in a report by Demas and Neville for the Getty Conservation Institute.

== The tomb ==
The tomb is located to the west of QV66, the tomb of Nefertari. It is thought that Tuya died around year 22 of the reign of her son Ramesses II. This estimate is based on the find of a jar docket dated to year 22 of Ramesses II. The inscription reads:

Year 22: Wine, [...] of the Great Vineyard of A[... of the ] King of South and North Egypt, Usermaatre Setepenre, L.P.H., in the Estate of Amun, [...]

The painted scenes are not well preserved due to later use of the tomb. Several objects, including the head of one of the canopic jars, fragments of a sarcophagus and parts of ushabtis were found in the tomb.

The tomb was reused during the Third Intermediate period and possibly the Ptolemaic and Coptic Periods.
