= Cristiana =

Cristiana is an Italian and Portuguese given name, from Cristiano. It is also a feminine given name in Romania, being the feminine form of Cristian. Tiana is a modern short form.

- Cristiana Capotondi
- Cristiana Cucchi
- Cristiana Peres
- Cristiana Oliveira
