= Dorothea Widmer =

Swiss woman executed for the murder of her abusive husband

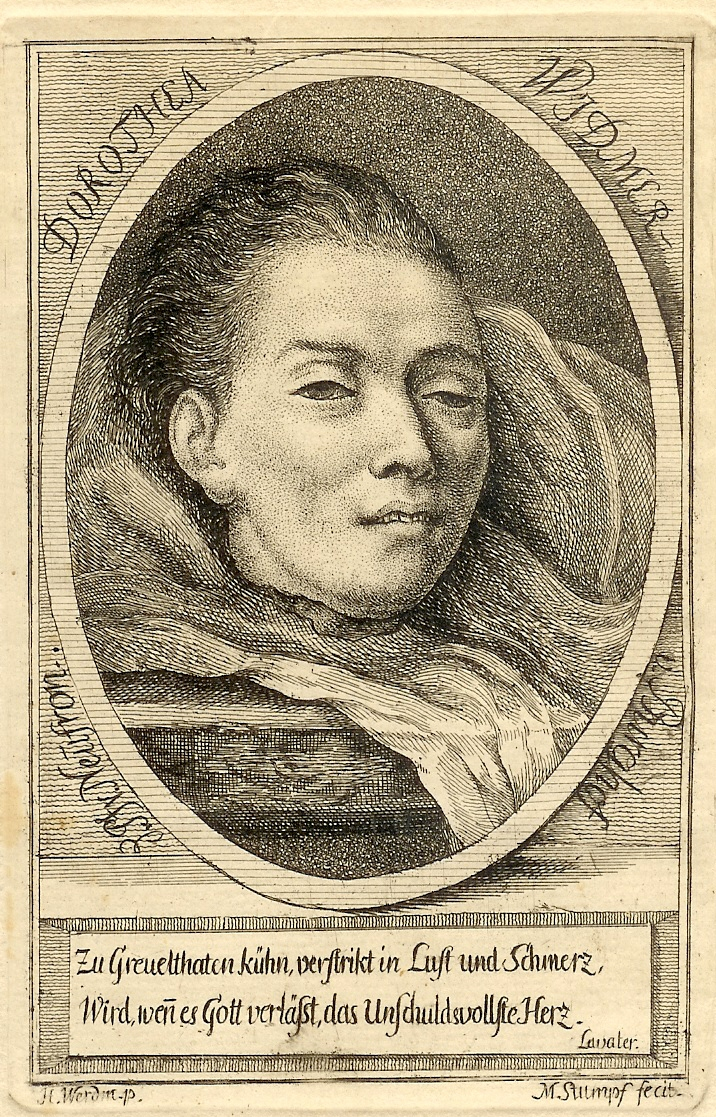
A copper engraving of Widmer by Matthias Stumpf.

Dorothea Widmer (1758–1781), was a Swiss woman who was abused by her husband until she killed him. Her crime attracted tremendous public attention in Switzerland.

Widmer's husband was an alcoholic who habitually abused her. With her accomplice Bartholome Gubler, Widmer murdered her husband with an axe.

Widmer and Gubler were both convicted of murder and sentenced to death. After a postponement until her child was born, Widmer was executed on 29 August 1781 in Zürich. Her accomplice was executed 18 days earlier.

Widmer attracted great public sympathy because of her youth, beauty and her longstanding abuse. She was compared with Beatrice Cenci and became the subject of poems and inscriptions.
