= Thea E. Smith =

American writer

- Born: Washington, D.C., U.S.
- Occupation: Writer, CEO
- Genre: Fictional

Thea E. Smith is the author of two novels: She Let Herself Go and Me, Myself, and Her. She makes her home in Halifax, Nova Scotia. She is the great-granddaughter of Arthur Powell Davis and of Theobald Smith, and the granddaughter of Sophocles Papas, founder of the Columbia Music Company, Inc.
