= Ian Healy Oval =

Cricket ground

- Location: Brisbane, Australia
- Coordinates: 27.4053°S 153.0442°E
- Establishment: 2021
- As of 18 September 2021; Source: Cricinfo

The Ian Healy Oval is a cricket ground at 128 Shaw Road, Wavell Heights in Brisbane, Queensland, Australia, named after the former Australian international cricketer Ian Healy.

Ian Healy Oval became eligible for first-class status with the scheduled Sheffield Shield fixture between Queensland and South Australia from 23–26 March 2021, which was abandoned without a ball bowled due to rain.

The first first-class match actually played at the ground was between Australia A and England Lions from 9–12 December 2021, which ended in a draw.
