= Dorothea Juliana Wallich =

German alchemist (1657–1725)

- Born: 1657; Weimar, Duchy of Saxe-Weimar, Holy Roman Empire
- Died: 1725 (aged 67–68); Arnstadt, Principality of Schwarzburg-Sondershausen, Holy Roman Empire
- Occupation: Alchemist

Dorothea Juliana Wallich (also known as Dorothea Wallich or D. J. W.; née Fischer; 1657 – 1725), was a German alchemist, one of the few women known to have practiced alchemy. She was also an apothecary, and a mine owner in Saxony.

== Biography ==
Dorothea Juliana Fischer was born in Weimar, Germany, in 1657. Her parents were Heinrich Fischer (1611–1665), a tax collector, and Anna-Catharina Lippach, the daughter of David Lipach. Anna's brother, David Lippach, was an archdeacon in Weimar.

Dorothea married Johann Wallich on March 1, 1674.

Wallich wrote three alchemical books, which were published in 1705 and 1706. Karl Christoph Schmieder considered the possibility that she had merely published manuscripts by her father; however, he also deemed her authorship possible.

In the second edition of Hermann Fictuld's Der Längst gewünschte und versprochene chymisch-philosophische Probier-Stein, auf welchem sowohl der wahrhafften hermetischen Adeptorum als der verführischen und betriegerischen Sophisten Schrifften sind probirt und nach deren Werth dargestellt worden, beschrieben in zweyen Classen (The long-desired and promised chemical-philosophical touchstone, on which the writings of both the true hermetic adepts and the deceptive and fraudulent sophists have been tested and their value assessed, described in two classes) (1753), an annotated bibliography of alchemical writings, he distinguishes between those he considers true adepts and sophists or charlatans. He criticized the works of alchemists such as Wallich with "great severity", castigating them as fit only for burning.

Jakob Böhme was an influence on her work.

== Selected works ==
- Das mineralische Gluten, doppelter Schlangen-Stab, Mercurius Philosophorum (The mineral gluten, double serpent staff, Mercurius Philosophorum) (1705)
- Der Philosophische Perl-Baum: das Gewächse der drey Prinzipien (The Philosophical Pearl Tree: the plant of the three principles) (1722)
- Schlüssel zu dem Cabinet der geheimen Schatz-Cammer der Natur (Key to the cabinet of the secret treasure chamber of nature) (1722)

== Bibliography ==
- Kraft, Alexander: "Dorothea Juliana Wallich, geb. Fischer (1657–1725), eine Alchemistin aus Thüringen." In: Genealogie Deutsche Zeitschrift für Familienkunde. vol. XXXIII, no. 66. Jahrgang, Heft 3, Degener & Co, Berlin 2017, pp. 539–555. (in German)
- Jette Anders: 33 Alchemistinnen. Die verborgene Seite einer alten Wissenschaft. Vergangenheitsverlag, Berlin 2016, ISBN 9783864082047, pp. 182–188. (in German)
- Helmut Gebelein: Alchemie (Diederichs Gelbe Reihe; Bd. 165). Hugendubel, Kreuzlingen 2000, ISBN 3896314025 (EA München 1991), p. (in German) 190. (in German)
- Karl Christoph Schieder: Die Geschichte der Alchemie. Verlag der Buchhandlung des Waisenhauses, Halle 1832, pp. 513–514. (in German)
