= Theodora Komnene =

Theodora Komnene or Comnena (Greek: Θεοδώρα Κομνηνὴ) may refer to:

- Theodora Komnene (daughter of Alexios I) (1096–?), daughter of Alexios I Komnenos, wife of Constantine Angelos and ancestor of the Angelos dynasty
- Theodora Despina Komnene (after 1438–after 1474), daughter of John IV of Trebizond and consort of Aq Qoyunlu's ruler Uzun Hasan
- Theodora Komnene Dalassene, sister of Alexios I Komnenos, wife of Constantine Diogenes II
- Theodora Komnene, Queen of Jerusalem (c. 1145–before 1182), niece of Manuel I Komnenos, wife of Baldwin III of Jerusalem
- Theodora Komnene, Duchess of Austria (c. 1134–1184), niece of Manuel I Komnenos, wife of Henry II, Duke of Austria
- Theodora Komnene, Princess of Antioch (fl. 1140), niece of Manuel I Komnenos, wife of Bohemond III of Antioch
