= Dorothea of Denmark =

Dorothea of Denmark may refer to:

- Dorothea of Brandenburg (1430–1495), wife of Christopher III of Denmark and later Christian I of Denmark
- Dorothea of Denmark, Duchess of Prussia (1504–1547), daughter of Frederick I of Denmark and first wife Anna of Brandenburg, and wife of Albert, Duke of Prussia
- Dorothea of Saxe-Lauenburg (1511–1571), wife of Christian III of Denmark
- Dorothea of Denmark, Electress Palatine (1520–1580), daughter of Christian II of Denmark, and wife of Frederick II, Elector Palatine
- Dorothea of Denmark, Duchess of Mecklenburg (1528–1575), daughter of Frederick I of Denmark and second wife Sophie of Pomerania, and wife of Christopher, Duke of Mecklenburg-Gadebusch
- Dorothea of Denmark, Duchess of Brunswick-Lüneburg (1546–1617), daughter of Christian III of Denmark, and wife of William, Duke of Brunswick-Lüneburg
