= Téa =

Téa is a female given name of French origin.

Notable people with the name include:

- Téa Ivanovic, Belgian businesswoman
- Téa Leoni (born 1966), American actress
- Téa Mutonji, Congo-born Canadian writer and poet
- Téa Obreht (born 1985), Serbian-American novelist

Notable fictional characters with the name include:

- Téa Delgado, in the US soap opera One Life to Live, played by Florencia Lozano
- Téa Gardner, in the Japanese manga and anime Yu-Gi-Oh!, voiced by Yumi Kakazu, Maki Saitō (Japanese), and Amy Birnbaum

== Cognates ==
- Tea (given name)
- Thea (name)
- Theia

== See also ==
- Téo & Téa, 2007 album by Jean-Michel Jarre
