= Jean-Claude Goyon =

French Egyptologist (1937–2021)

- Born: 2 August 1937; Mâcon, France
- Died: 24 June 2021 (aged 83); Villeurbanne, France
- Occupation: Egyptologist
- Spouse: Marie-France Goyon

Jean-Claude Goyon (2 August 1937 – 24 June 2021) was a French Egyptologist, and professor of Egyptology at Lumière University Lyon 2.

== Biography ==
After earning a doctoral degree in literature, Goyon became a research fellow at the French National Centre for Scientific Research and a professor of Egyptology at Lumière University Lyon 2.

Goyon died in Villeurbanne on 24 June 2021 at the age of 83.

== Publications ==
- Le papyrus du Louvre n°3279 (1966)
- Confirmation du pouvoir royal au nouvel an (1972)
- Rituels funéraires de l'ancienne Égypte, le rituel de l'embaumement, le rituel de l'ouverture de la bouche, les livres des respirations (1972)
- Ramesseum I et VI (1973)
- Confirmation du pouvoir royal au nouvel an (1974)
- Le secret des pyramides (1977)
- Les dieux-gardiens et la genèse des temples d'après les textes égyptiens de l'époque gréco-romaine, les soixante d'Edfou et les soixante dix sept dieux de Pharbaethos (1985)
- Les bâtisseurs de Karnak (1987)
- Un corps pour l'éternité. Autopsie d'une momie (1988)
- L'Égypte restituée, sites et temples de Haute-Égypte (1650 av. J.-C.-300 Ap. J.-C.) (1991)
- Amphores grecques archaïques de Gurna : à propos d'une publication récente (1992)
- Chirurgie religieuse ou thanatopraxie ? Données nouvelles sur la momification en Égypte et réflexions qu'elles impliquent (1992)
- L'Égypte restituée, Sites et temples des déserts, de la naissance de la civilisation pharaonique à l'époque gréco-romaine (1994)
- Remarques sur l'ouvrage de F. de Romanis (1996)
- L'Égypte restituée, sites, temples et pyramides de Moyenne et Basse Égypte de la naissance de la civilisation pharaonique à l'époque gréco-romaine (1997)
- Rê, Maât et pharaon ou Le destin de l'Égypte antique (1998)
- L'Égypte antique : À travers la collection de l'institut d'égyptologie Victor-Loret de Lyon (2007)

== Distinctions ==
- Prix Bordin (1973)
- Knight of the Legion of Honour
