= Tiiu =

Female given name

- Gender: Female
- Language: Estonian
- Name day: 1 November

Origin
- Region of origin: Estonia

Other names
- Related names: Tiia

Tiiu is an Estonian feminine given name and may refer to:

- Tiiu Aro (born 1952), Estonian physician and politician
- Tiiu Asper (born 1983), Estonian judoka
- Tiiu Erelt (born 1942), Estonian linguist
- Tiiu Kera (born 1945), retired United States Air Force major general
- Tiiu Kirsipuu (born 1957), Estonian sculptor
- Tiiu Kuik (born 1987), Estonian fashion model
- Tiiu Kull (born 1958), Estonian botanist
- Tiiu Levald (born 1940), Estonian opera singer, pedagogue and music critic
- Tiiu Märss (born 1943), Estonian geologist and paleontologist
- Tiiu Parmas (1943–2011), Estonian tennis player
- Tiiu Nurmberg (born 1982), Canadian-Estonian alpine skier
