= Tiana Atkinson =

Australian cricketer

Personal information
- Full name: Tiana Atkinson
- Born: 30 April 2002 (age 24)
- Batting: Right-handed
- Bowling: Right-arm medium
- Role: Batter

Domestic team information
- Years: Team
- 2021/22–2022/23: Victoria

Career statistics
Competition	WLA
Matches	5
Runs scored	63
Batting average	12.60
100s/50s	0/0
Top score	38
Catches/stumpings	0/–
- Source: CricketArchive, 3 March 2023

Tiana Atkinson (born 30 April 2002) is an Australian cricketer who plays as a right-handed batter. She last played for Victoria in the Women's National Cricket League (WNCL).

== Domestic career ==
Atkinson plays grade cricket for Dandenong Cricket Club. She made her debut for Victoria on 10 March 2022, against Queensland in the WNCL, scoring 6 runs as her side won by 64 runs. She played four matches for the side in the 2022–23 WNCL, scoring 57 runs with a top score of 38.
