= Dorothea of Brandenburg (disambiguation) =

Dorothea of Brandenburg (died 1495), was the daughter of John, Margrave of Brandenburg-Kulmbach, and wife of Christopher of Bavaria and Christian I of Denmark.

Dorothea of Brandenburg was the name of several other princesses from the House of Hohenzollern:

- Dorothea of Brandenburg (1420–1491), daughter of Frederick I, Margrave of Brandenburg, and wife of Henry IV, Duke of Mecklenburg
- Dorothea of Brandenburg (1446–1519), daughter of Frederick II, Margrave of Brandenburg, and wife of John V, Duke of Saxe-Lauenburg
- Dorothea of Brandenburg (1471–1520), daughter of Albrecht III Achilles, Elector of Brandenburg, and Abbess in Bamberg
