= Tia (princess) =

- King's Sister; Singer of Hathor, Singer of Re of Heliopolis, Singer of Amun-great-in-his-glory
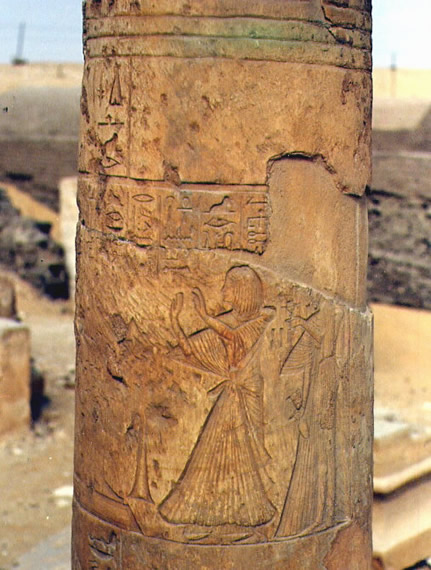
- Column from the tomb chapel of Tia and her husband Tia
- Born: Thebes?
- Died: Saqqara?
- Burial: Saqqara
- Spouse: Tia
- Issue: Mutmetjennefer
- Dynasty: 19th of Egypt
- Father: Seti I
- Mother: Tuya
- Religion: Ancient Egyptian religion

Tia or Tiya was an ancient Egyptian princess during the 19th Dynasty.

== Family ==
Tia was the daughter of Pharaoh Seti I and Queen Tuya and the older sister of Ramesses II. She is attested only on monuments dating to Ramesses' reign.

Tia was married to an official who was also called Tia. The couple had two daughters, Mutmetjennefer and another, whose name did not survive. They were depicted in their parents' tomb in Saqqara.

== Life ==
She was born in the reign of Horemheb into a non-royal family, before her grandfather Paramessu (later Ramesses I) ascended to the throne. It is possible she was named after her grandmother, who is known as Sitre, but could be identical with a woman named Tia, who was named as Seti's mother. Her only known sibling is Pharaoh Ramesses II; a younger princess called Henutmire was either her sister or her niece.

Since she was not born as a princess, she is one of the few princesses during Egypt's history, who married outside the royal family. Her husband, a royal scribe, was also called Tia and was the son of a high-ranking official called Amonwahsu. Tia, son of Amonwahsu was Ramesses' tutor, and held important offices later in his reign, he was Overseer of the treasuries, and Overseer of the Cattle of Amun. Princess Tia, similarly to other noble ladies, held titles which indicate she took part in religious rituals ("Singer of Hathor", "Singer of Re of Heliopolis", "Singer of Amun-great-in-his-glory").

Tia and Tia are depicted on a stone block, together with Queen Tuya (this is now on display at the Royal Ontario Museum in Toronto). Another stone block, now in Chicago, shows Tia (the husband) with his father Amonwahsu, Pharaoh Seti I, and Ramesses II as crown-prince.

== Death and burial ==
The couple Tia and Tia were buried in Saqqara. The tomb was built close to that of Horemheb, and was excavated by Geoffrey T. Martin.
