= Tiia-Maria Talvitie =

Finnish biathlete

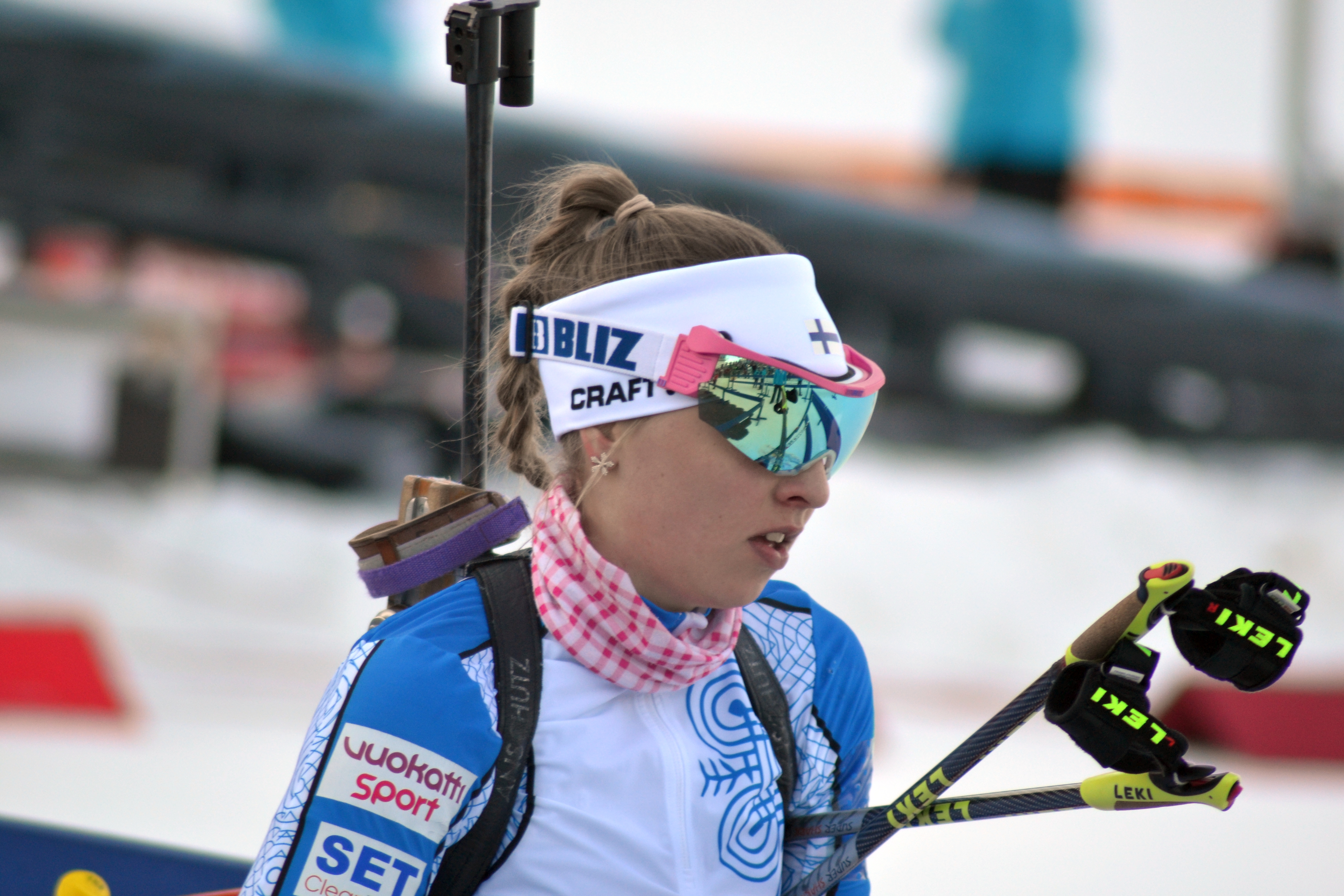

Personal information
- Born: 3 April 1994 (age 32)

Sport

Professional information
- Sport: Biathlon
- Club: Jalasjärven Jalas
- World Cup debut: 2017

Olympic Games
- Teams: 0
- Medals: 0

World Championships
- Teams: 0
- Medals: 0

World Cup
- Seasons: 1 (2016/17–)
- Individual victories: 0
- All victories: 0
- Individual podiums: 0
- All podiums: 0

Tiia-Maria Talvitie (born 3 April 1994) is a Finnish biathlete.
