= Tia (overseer of treasury) =

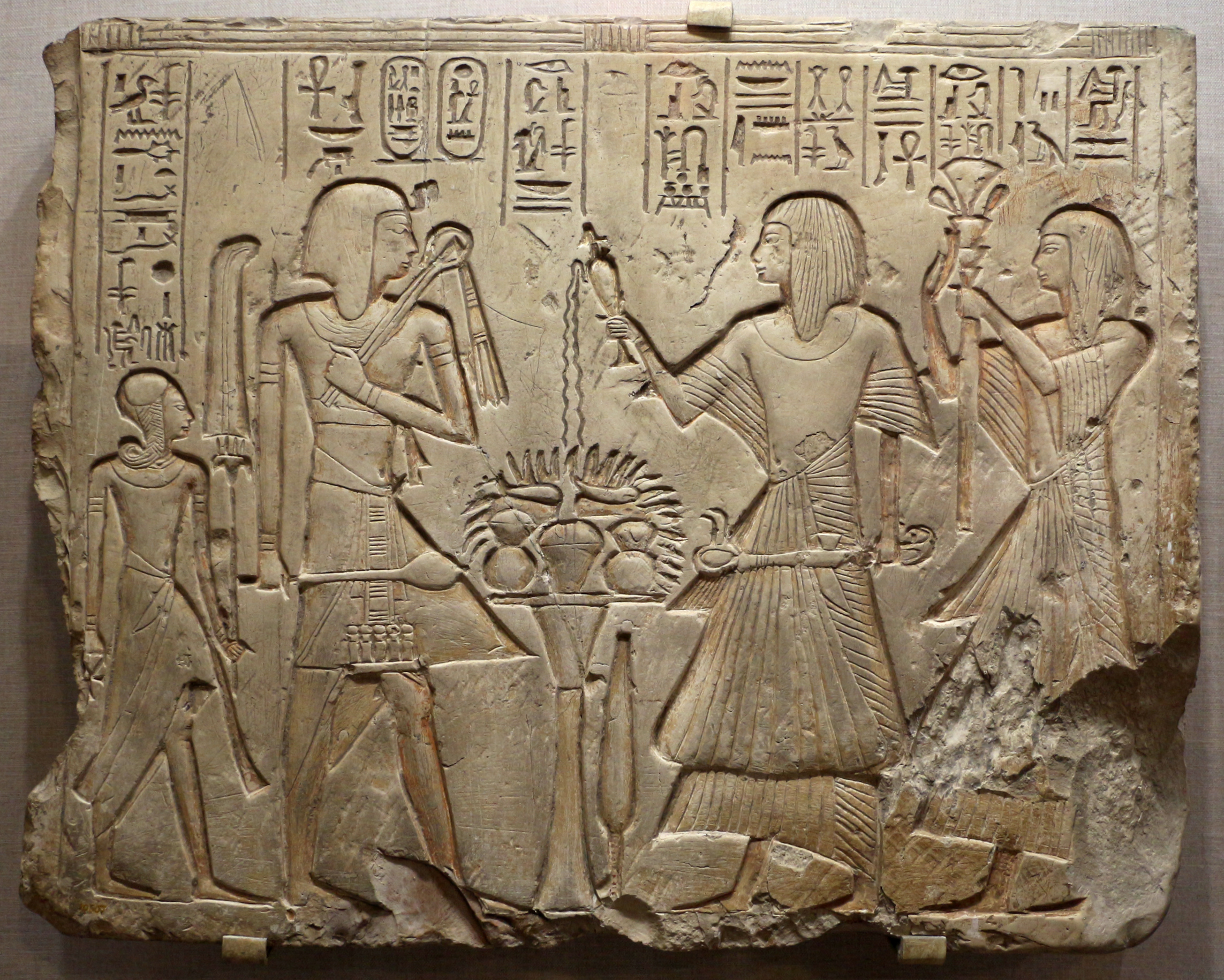
Amenwahsu and his son Tia (right) making offerings to Seti I and prince Ramesses

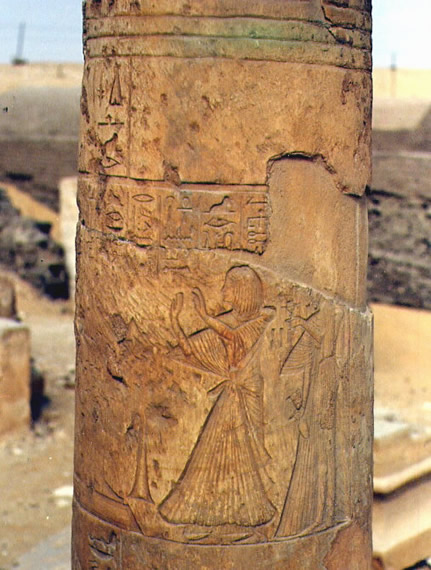
Column with the depiction of Tia and his wife Tia

Tia was an ancient Egyptian high official under king Ramses II. His main title was that of an overseer of the treasuries. Tia was married to a woman with the same name, the princess Tia who was sister of Ramses II.

== Career and Family ==
Not much is known about the early years. One of the earliest mentions of Tia is on a block now in the University of Chicago Oriental Institute (no. 10507). Tia and a man named Amenwashu are shown before King Seti I and the then crown-prince Ramesses II. Habachi conjectured that Amenwashu was Tia's father, but there is no evidence to support this idea. The identification of the man Tia on the Chicago stela with the official Tia is based on the rarity of the name. It is not known when Tia married Ramesses's sister Tia.

Tia had several honorific titles including hereditary prince and governor, seal-bearer of the King, sole companion, overseer of the secrets of the royal palace, favorite of the Horus in his palace, eyes of the King, and ears of the King. Tia's executive titles include, King's scribe, fanbearer on the right of the King and his most common title: overseer of the treasury in the Temple of Usermaatre Setepenre in the Domain of Amun.

A limestone block shows Tia and Tia in the presence of Queen Tuya. This scene likely comes from the tomb in Saqqara is now in the Royal Ontario Museum (no. 955-79-2). Tuya is said to be a God's Wife and a King's Mother. Tia is clearly stated to be the King's sister and this scene shows that she was indeed the sister of Ramesses II.

== Tomb at Saqqara ==
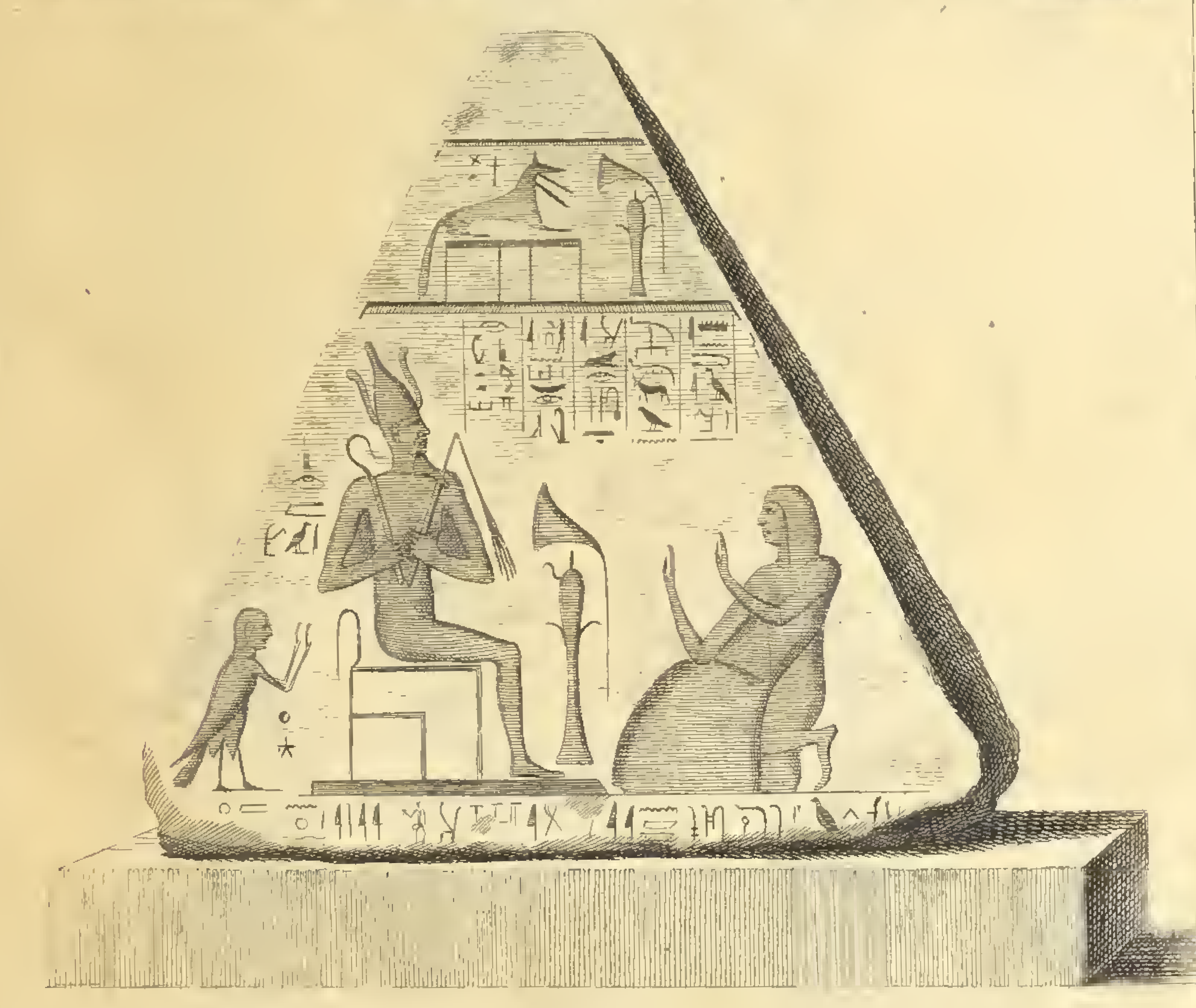
Pyramidion of the two Tias

Tia and Tia are best known from their tomb at Saqqara which was placed between the tomb of the 18th Dynasty general Horemhab (the later king) and the overseer of the treasuries Maya, the latter had the same title as Tia. The tomb is not very well preserved. The main entrance was on the east side. There was a first courtyard and a second one that was adorned with columns. At the back there were chapels and at the very back a small pyramid.

The outer courtyard of the tomb contained two smaller tomb-chapels. One of the chapels belonged to Iurudef, while the name of the owner of the second chapel is not known. A stela of an official belonging to the household of Tia, named Panakhtenniut, was found nearby. There is, however, no evidence that he was the owner of the chapel.

Tia was already known from several objects before his tomb was discovered. A pyramidion reached England in 1722 and was brought there from Alexandria. It is only known from old drawings, but they are good enough to read the name and titles.

Tia was once buried in a set of three coffins. There was a wooden inner, anthropoid coffin, a middle granite, anthropoid coffin and an outer, wooden, rectangular coffin. The coffins were only found in small fragments.

== Chapel at Kafr el-Gebel ==
Not all materials mentioning Tia and Tia come from the tomb in Saqqara. Ahmed Mahmoud Moussa discovered a funerary chapel at Kafr el-Gebel which is located to the south of the Giza Pyramid Plateau at the edge of the desert. In Chapel G a stela showing Ramesses II before Osiris and the deified Seti I. A lower register of the stela depicts Queen Tuya followed by Tia and Tia before the goddess Isis and Ahmose (or a statue of the King).

== Inscriptions ==
The 1997 excavation report contains a list of known inscriptions associated with Tia and Tia. Below is a small sample of those inscriptions. These inscriptions are also mentioned in Kenneth Kitchen's Ramesside Inscriptions or are otherwise notable:

- Lower Half of a stela (Chicago Oriental Institute). Tia and Amenwashu appear before Seti I and Ramesses II.
- Freestanding Block Stela (Cairo JdE 89624). A four sided stela showing Tia adoring Re-Horakhti, Atum, Osiris and Sokar. The stela mentions Ramesses II. The stela comes from the Kefr el Gebel Chapel.
- Relief on Sandstone block (Royal Ontario Museum No 955-79-2) Hathor of the Southern Sycamore adored by Queen Tuya, the treasurer Tia and the King's Sister Tia.
- Limestone Stela (Florence Inv. 2532) Stela depicts both husband and wife. This stela once stood at the North wall of the second courtyard of the tomb of Tia and Tia.
- Schist Stela (Louvre E.7717) Tia adoring Ptah Re and Amun.
- Stone Relief (In trade in Paris 1973) Both husband and wife are mentioned.
- Top of a Limestone Stela (National Museum, Copenhagen, B5- AA d22) Tia is shown seated and the stela mentions Tjenruamun, a scorpion remover. The stela likely comes from the tomb of Tia and Tia, but it is possible it derives from the Kafr el-Gebel Chapel at Giza.
- Pyramidion (ex-Lethieullier Coll.) Tia shown worshipping a soul bird adoring Re-Horakhti, Osiris, Atum and Osiris a second time. The pyramidion was brought to England in 1722 by William Lethieullier. The pyramidion was seen and copied in the 18th century by Alexander Gordon. The present location of the pyramidion is not known. All four sides show Tia adoring a seated god.
- Stamped brick mentioning Tia from Thebes.
- Sarcophagus fragments (Ny Carlsberg AEIN 48) Seven fragments of the black granite sarcophagus show that Tia was buried in a mummiform sarcophagus.
- Shabti figure (Formerly J.F. Lewis Coll., USA) Inscribed for the Osiris, Royal Scribe, Treasury Chief Tia, justified. Possibly glazed steatite.
- Stela of retainer Amenemhab-Pakheru (Gubelkian Museum, Durham, N 1965). Dedicated by Iurudef, Son of Pakhuru. The cornice of the stela shows four baboons worshipping the sun. Tia and Tia are shown worshipping Osiris and Isis-Hathor.
