= Thea (name) =

- Gender: feminine

Origin
- Origin: Greek
- Derivation: from Greek Θεία, Theía
- Meaning: Goddess
- Region of origin: Ancient Greece

Other names
- Related names: Tea, Téa

Thea is a feminine given name, from Greek Θεία, Theía, "Goddess". Other forms include Tea and Téa.

== People ==
- Thea Andrews (born 1973), Canadian journalist
- Thea Astley (1925–2004), Australian writer
- Thea Beckman (1923–2004), Dutch writer
- Thea Bock (1938–2025), German politician
- Thea Bowman (1937–1990), American nun
- Thea Dorn (born 1970), German writer
- Thea E. Smith, American writer
- Thea Ehre (born 1999), Austrian performer
- Thea Einöder (born 1951), German rower
- Thea Exley (1923–2007), Australian archivist and art historian
- Thea Flaum (born 1938), American TV producer
- Thea Foss (1857–1927), American entrepreneur
- Thea Garcia-Ramirez, Belizean women's rights activist and politician
- Thea Garrett, Maltese singer
- Thea Gill (born 1970), Canadian actress
- Thea Gilmore (born 1979), British singer-songwriter
- Thea Gregory (c. 1926–2022), English actress
- Thea Halo, American writer
- Thea Hochleitner (1925–2012), Austrian alpine skier
- Thea Kano (born 1965), American conductor
- Thea Johansson (born 2002), Swedish ice hockey player
- Tea Jorjadze or Thea Djordjadze, Georgian artist
- Thea Kellner (1914–?), Romanian fencer
- Thea King (1925–2007), British clarinettist
- Thea Knutzen (1930–2016), Norwegian politician
- Thea Leitner (1921–2016), Austrian writer
- Thea Sofie Loch Næss (born 1996), Norwegian actress
- Thea Muldoon (1927–2015), New Zealander first lady
- Thea Musgrave (born 1928), Scottish composer
- Thea Porter (1927–2000), British fashion designer
- Thea Proctor (1879–1966), Australian artist
- Thea Rasche (1899–1971), German pilot
- Thea de Roos-van Rooden (born 1949), Dutch historian and politician
- Thea Sharrock, English theatre director
- Thea Slatyer (born 1983), Australian footballer
- Thea Stabell (born 1939), Norwegian actress
- Thea Tewi (1902–1999), German-born American sculptor and lingerie designer
- Thea Tolentino (born 1996), Filipina actress
- Thea Trinidad (born 1990), American wrestler
- Thea Vidale (born 1956), American comedian and actress
- Thea Van Seijen, Dutch singer
- Thea von Harbou (1888–1954), German filmmaker and actress
- Thea White (1940–2021), American voice actress

== Fictional characters ==
- Thea Elvsted, a character in Henrik Ibsen's 1890 play Hedda Gabler
- Thea Fenchel, the protagonist's love interest in Saul Bellow’s The Adventures of Augie March
- Thea Queen, an incarnation of the DC Comics' superheroine Speedy played by Willa Holland on the CW's 2012 television programme Arrow
- Thea Stilton, the main protagonist in the Thea Stilton book franchise and one of the main protagonists in the Geronimo Stilton book franchise
- Thea the Thursday Fairy, from the Rainbow Magic book franchise
- Thea, a playable character in Fire Emblem Binding Blade
- Thea Brody-Daughter of Michael Brody~~Jaws 4: The Revenge
- Thea Ransome, a scientist played by Wanda Ventham in the Doctor Who story Image of the Fendahl
