= Tea (given name) =

Tea is a given name. It is a feminine name in Indo-European languages and is cognate to the names Theia, Thea and Téa and related to the name Tia. Masculine usage is found in Oceania.

Notable people with the feminine name include:

- Tea Alagic (born 1972), Bosnian-American theatre director
- Tea Donguzashvili (born 1976), Russian judoka of Georgian origin, 2004 Olympic bronze medalist
- Tea Falco (born 1986), Italian actress, birth name Teresa
- Tea Grubišić (born 1985), Croatian handball player
- Tea Gueci (born 1999), Italian chess player
- Tea Hiilloste (born 1982), Finnish singer
- Tea Ista (1932–2014), Finnish actress, birth name Dorothea
- Tea Jorjadze (born 1971), Georgian artist
- Tea Lanchava (born 1974), Georgian-Dutch chess player
- Tea Mäkipää (born 1973), Finnish artist
- Tea Marinović (born 1999), Montenegrin handball player
- Tea Bajraktarević (born 1985), Serbian-American novelist better known as Téa Obreht
- Tea Palić (born 1991), Croatian alpine skier
- Tea Pijević (born 1991), Croatian handball player
- Tea Sugareva (born 1989), Bulgarian theatre director, drama teacher and poet
- Tea Tairović (born 1996), Serbian singer
- Tea Tulić (born 1978), Croatian writer
- Tea Ugrin (born 1998), Italian artistic gymnast
- Tea Vikstedt-Nyman (born 1959), Finnish racing cyclist
- Tea Villilä (born 1991), Finnish ice hockey player

Notable people with the masculine name include:

- Tea Ropati (born 1964), rugby league footballer from New Zealand and Western Samoa
- Tea Tooala Peato (born ~1940), Samoan politician

== See also ==
- Tea (disambiguation)
