= Molly (name) =

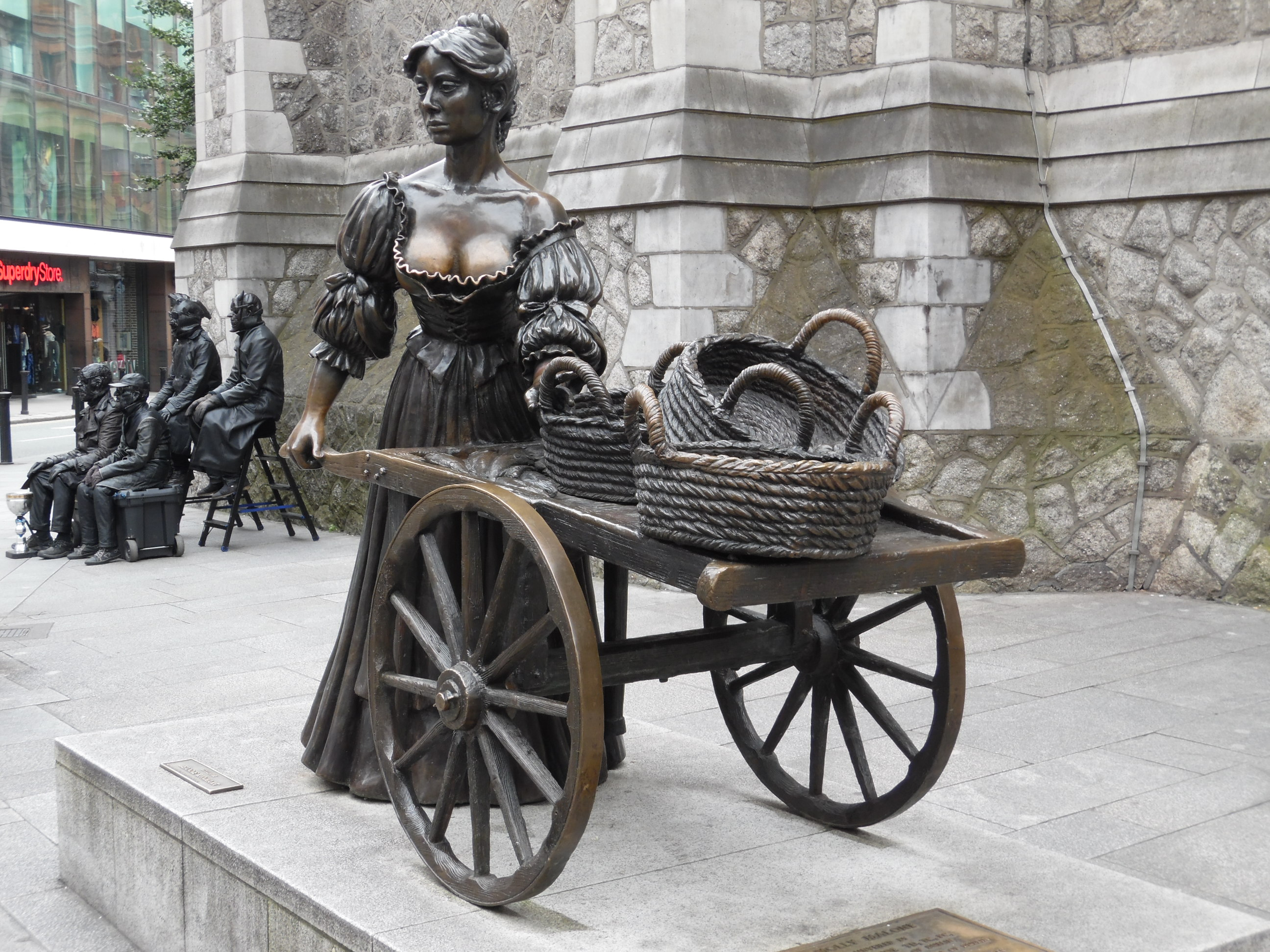
- A statue of folk song heroine Molly Malone in Dublin, Ireland.
- Pronunciation: /ˈmɒli/
- Gender: Female
- Language: Irish and English

Other names
- Alternative spelling: Mollie; Moli
- Nicknames: Mols; Mol
- Derived: Mary; Margaret

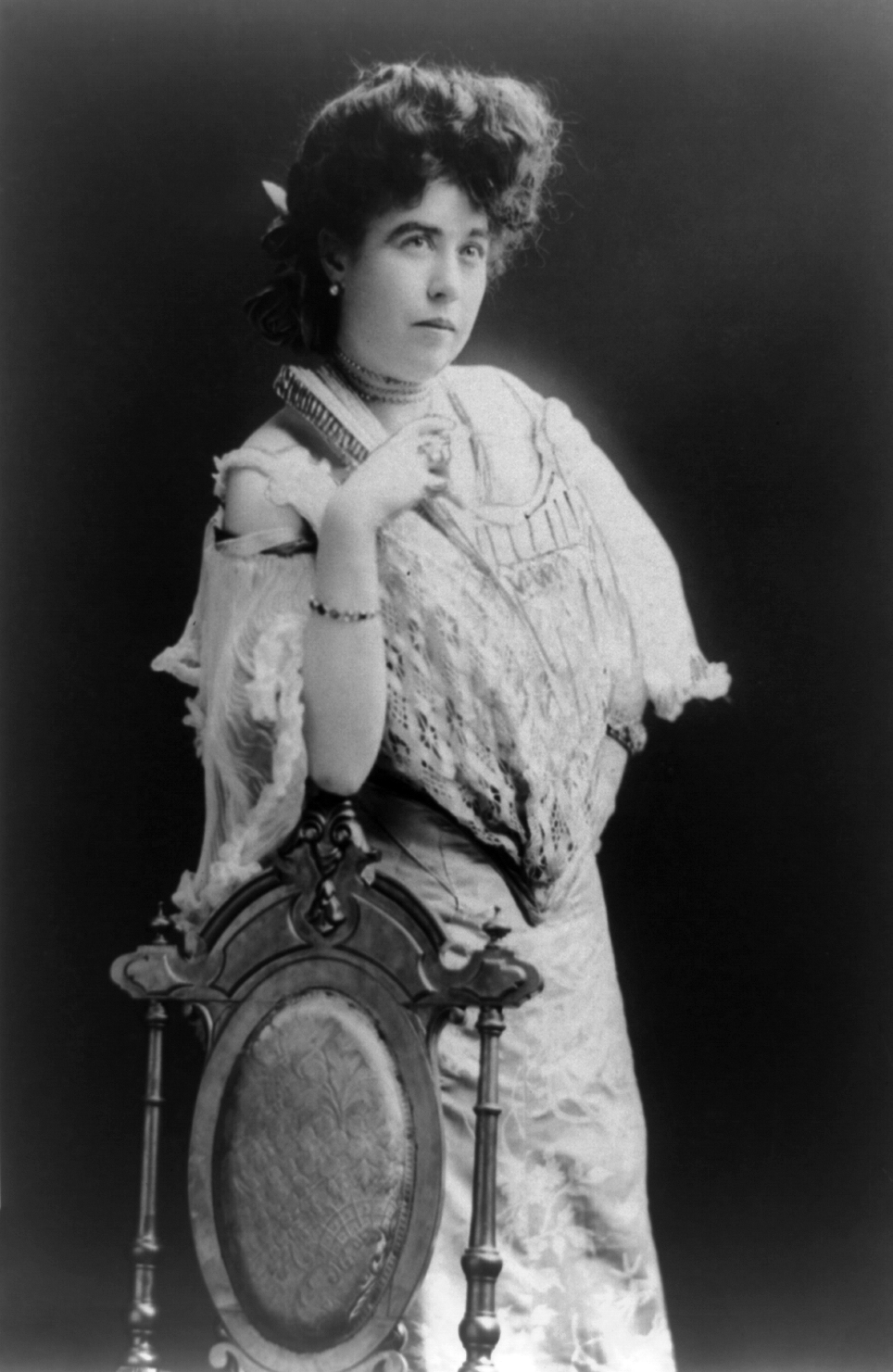
Titanic survivor Margaret Brown, who was later called "The Unsinkable Molly Brown."

Molly (also spelled Molli or Mollie) is a diminutive of the feminine name Mary that, like other English hypocorisms in use since the Middle Ages, substituted l for r. Molly evolved from the English diminutive Mally. English surnames such as Moll, Mollett, and Mollison are derived from Molly. Molly has also been used as a diminutive of Margaret and Martha since the 1700s and as an independent name since at least 1720. The name was more popular in the United States than elsewhere in the Anglosphere in the 1800s due to usage by Irish-American families and by Jewish American families who used Molly as an English version of Hebrew names such as Miriam and Malka. Its popularity with Americans was also influenced by stories about Molly Pitcher, a heroine of the American Revolutionary War.

== Usage ==
The name has been among the 1,000 most popular names for girls in the United States since 1880 and was among the 100 most popular names for American girls at different times between 1987 and 2012. It has been among the 100 most popular names for newborn girls in Australia, Ireland, New Zealand, Sweden, and the United Kingdom since the 1990s, and in Denmark since 2019. It was among the top 100 names for girls in some Canadian provinces between 2007 and 2011.

== People ==
- Molly Adair (1905–1990), English actress
- Molly Aguirre (born 1984), American snowboarder
- Molly Antopol (born 1978), American fiction and nonfiction writer
- Molly Applebaum (born 1930), Polish-Canadian holocaust survivor and diarist
- Molly Musiime Asiimwe (born 1962), Ugandan politician
- Mollie Arline Kirkland Bailey (c. 1844–1918), American circus musician, singer, wartime nurse and alleged Confederate spy
- Molly Bair (born 1997), American model
- Molly Ball, American political journalist and writer
- Molly Bang (born 1943), American illustrator
- Molly Lyons Bar-David (1910–1987) Canadian-born Israeli journalist, cookbook author
- Molly Barker, American educator and triathlete
- Molly Barton (1861–1949), Irish artist
- Molly Bartrip (born 1996), English footballer
- Molly Baumgardner (born 1959), American politician
- Molly Baz, American cook, food writer and video host
- Martina "Molly" Beck (born 1979), German biathlete
- Molly Bee (1939–2009), stage name of Mollie Gene Beachboard, American country music singer
- Molly Bernard (born 1988), American actress
- Molly Beucher, American actress
- Molly Bingham, American journalist and filmmaker
- Molly Birnbaum, American writer
- Molly Bish (1983–2000), American murder victim
- Molly Blackburn (1930–1985), South African activist
- Molly Blake (1917–2011), British illustrator
- Molly Bloom (born 1978), American entrepreneur and author
- Molly Lamb Bobak (1920–2014), Canadian teacher and artist
- Molly Bolin (born 1957), American basketball player
- Molly Bordonaro, American diplomat
- Molly Botkin (born 1943), American swimmer
- Molly Brant (c. 1736–1796), prominent Mohawk woman in the era of the American Revolution
- Molly S. Bray, American geneticist
- Molly Brearley, British educationist, teacher and writer
- Molly Brett, English illustrator and children's author
- Molly Corbett Broad (1941–2023), American academic administrator
- Molly Brodak (1980–2020), American poet, writer and baker
- Margaret "The Unsinkable Molly" Brown (1867–1932), survivor of the sinking of the RMS Titanic, philanthropist and activist
- Molly Bruggeman (born 1992), American rower
- Molly Buck, American politician
- Molly Burch (born 1990), American musician
- Molly Burhans, American cartographer, data scientist and environmental activist
- Molly Burke (born 1994), Canadian YouTube personality
- Molly Burman, musical artist
- Molly Burnett (born 1988), American actress and singer
- Molly Byrne (born 1928), Australian politician

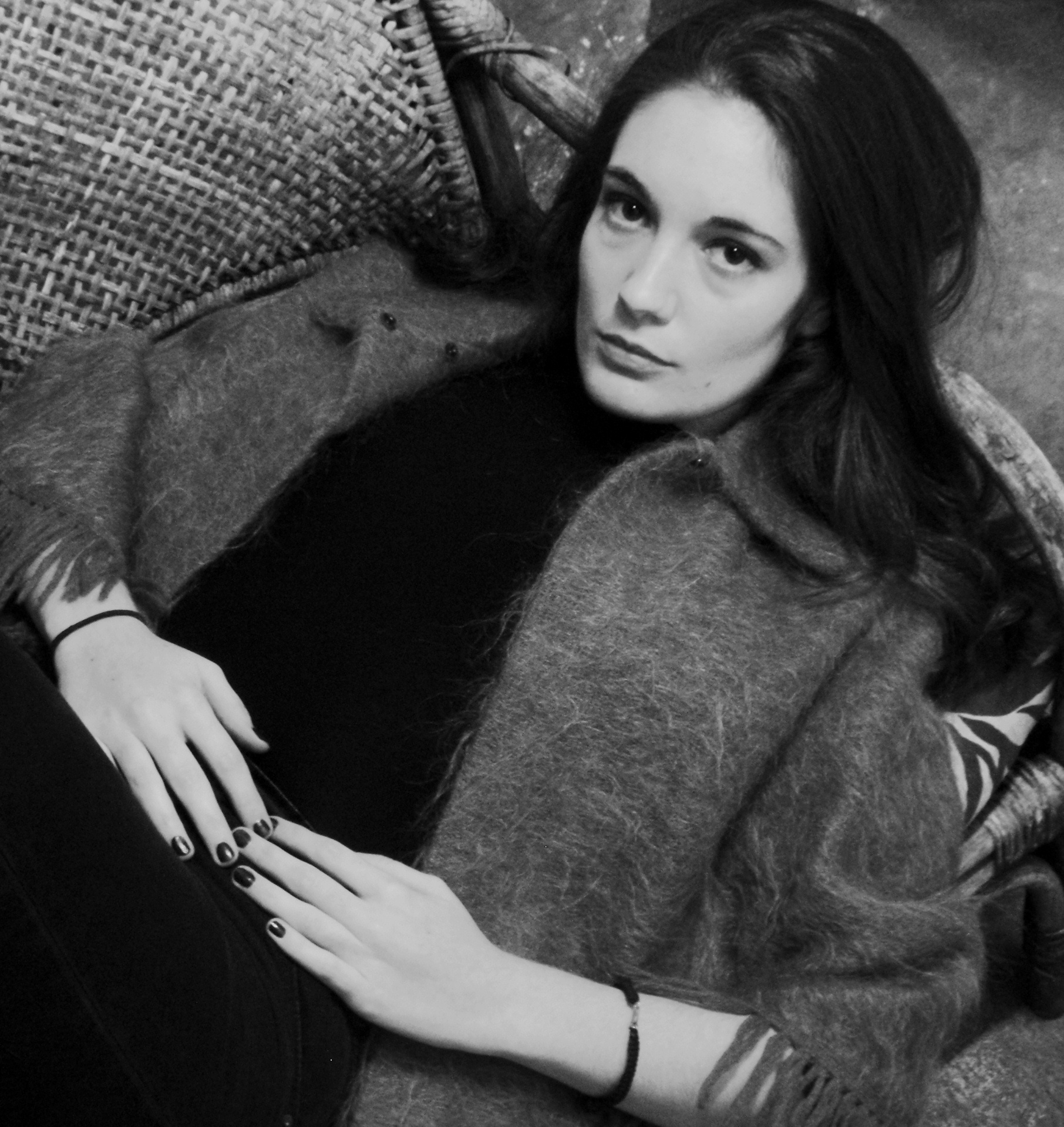
Molly Contogeorge, Australian singer-songwriter

- Molly Cameron (born 1976), American racing cyclist
- Molly Carlson (born 1998), Canadian high diver
- Molly Carnes, American physician and academic
- Molly Caudery (born 2000), English pole vaulter
- Molly Cesanek (born 2001), American ice dancer
- Molly Chacko (born 1969), Indian middle-distance runner
- Molly Cheek (born 1950), American actress
- Molly Childers (1875–1964), American-Irish writer and nationalist
- Molly Clark (c. 1920–2012), pastoral and tourism pioneer from Central Australia
- Molly Clutton-Brock (1912–2013), British physical therapist and youth worker
- Molly Conger, American activist and journalist
- Molly Conlin (born 2001), English actress
- Molly Contogeorge, Australian singer songwriter and musician
- Molly Cook, American registered nurse and politician
- Molly Cotton (c. 1902–1984), British archaeologist
- Molly Cowan, New Zealand sprinter
- Molly Cox (1925–1991), British television producer
- Molly Crabapple (née Jennifer Caban; born 1983), American artist and writer
- Molly Craft (1895–1978), American baseball player
- Molly Craig, Australian Martu Aboriginal woman
- Molly Cramer (1852–1936), German artist
- Molly Creamer (born 1981), American basketball player
- Molly J. Crockett (born 1983), American neuroscientist
- Molly Culver (born 1967), American actress and model
- Molly Daniels, Australian actress
- Molly Davies, British playwright
- Molly Davis (born 2000), American basketball player
- Molly Dineen (born 1959), British documentary filmmaker
- Molly Dodd (1921–1981), American actress
- Molly Donahue, American educator and politician
- Molly Drake (1915–1993), English poet and musician
- Molly Duncan (1945–2019), Scottish saxophonist
- Molly Dunsworth (born 1990), Canadian actress
- Molly Engstrom (born 1983), American ice hockey player
- Molly Ephraim (born 1986), American actress
- Molly Erdman, American actress
- Mary "Mollie" Evans (1922–2016), British antique dealer
- Molly Fink (1896–1967), Australian socialite
- Molly Fisk (born 1955), American poet and radio commentator
- Molly Flaherty (1914–1989), Australian cricketer
- Molly Gaskin, Trinidad and Tobago environmentalist
- Molly Geertsema (1918–1991), Dutch politician
- Molly Giles, American writer
- Molly Gloss (born 1944), American novelist
- Molly Glynn (1968–2014), American actress
- Molly Goddard, British fashion designer
- Molly Goodenbour (born 1972), American basketball player and coach
- Molly Goodman (born 1993), Australian rower
- Molly Goodnight (1839–1926), American rancher
- Molly Gordon (born 1994), American actress
- Molly Gourlay (1898–1990), British golfer
- Molly Grace, musical artist
- Molly Graham, Scottish amateur golfer
- Molly Gray (born 1984), American politician
- Molly Gregory (1914–2006), American artist
- Molly Guion (1910–1982), American painter
- Molly Hagan (born 1961), American actress
- Molly-Mae Hague (born 1999), English influencer
- Molly Hamley-Clifford (1887–1956), British actress
- Molly Hammar (born 1995), Swedish singer and songwriter
- Molly Hannis (born 1992), American swimmer
- Mollie Hardwick (1916–2003), English author
- Molly Harper, American writer
- Molly Harrison (curator) (1909–2002), English museum curator and author
- Molly Harrower (1906–1999), American clinical psychologist
- Molly Hawkey (born 1978), American actress and photographer
- Molly Haskell (born 1939), American feminist film critic and author
- Molly Hattersley, British educationist
- Molly Hawkey (born 1978), American actress
- Molly Costain Haycraft (1911–2005), Canadian writer
- Molly Healy, Australian cricketer
- Molly Henneberg (born 1973), American journalist
- Molly Hide (1913–1995), English cricketer
- Molly Hocking (born 2000), English singer
- Molly Holden (1927–1981), British poet
- Molly Holly (born 1977), American professional wrestler
- Molly Holzschlag (1963–2023), American computer scientist
- Molly Howard, American politician
- Molly Huddle (born 1984), American long-distance runner
- Mary Vivian "Molly" Hughes (1886–1956), British author
- Mollie Hunter (1922–2012), Scottish writer
- Molly Idle, American children's book illustrator
- Mary "Molly" Ivins (1944–2007), American columnist, political commentator, humorist and author
- Molly Izzard (1919–2004), English writer
- Molly Jahn, American plant geologist
- Molly Jenkins, American politician
- Molly Jenson (born 1979), American singer songwriter
- Molly Jobe, American actress and singer
- Mollie Johnson, 19th-century American Old West madam in South Dakota
- Margaret "Molly" Johnson (born 1959), Canadian singer and songwriter
- Molly Johnson (writer) (1931–2016), Swedish novelist
- Molly Jong-Fast (born 1978), American author and pundit
- Molly Jovic (born 1995), Australian netball player
- Molly Nawe Kamukama (born 1973), Ugandan politician
- Mollie Katzen (born 1950), American chef and cookbook writer
- M. M. Kaye (1908–2004), British writer, author of The Far Pavilions
- Molly Kazan (1906–1963), American dramatist
- Mary "Molly" Keane (née Mary Nesta Skrine; 1904–1996), Irish novelist and playwright
- Molly Kearney (born 1992), American actor and comedian
- Molly Kehoe (born 2004), Caymanian footballer
- Molly Kelly (born 1949), American politician
- Molly Kelly (rugby union), Wales international rugby union player
- Molly Kate Kestner (born 1995), American singer
- Molly Kiely (born 1969), Canadian-American alternative cartoonist
- Molly Killingbeck (born 1959), Canadian sprinter
- Mollie King (born 1987), British singer with The Saturdays
- Molly Kool (1916–2009), Canadian sea captain
- Molly Kreklow (born 1992), American volleyball player
- Mollie Kyle (1886–1937), survivor of the Osage Indian murders
- Molly Ladd-Taylor (born 1955), Canadian historian
- Molly Lambert, American journalist
- Molly Lamont (1910–2001), South African-born British film actress
- Molly Lanyero (born 1975), Ugandan politician
- Molly Larkey, American artist
- Molly Lazechko (1926–2010), American politician
- Molly Leach (born 1960), American graphic designer
- Molly Le Bas (1903–1996), British artist
- Molly Lefebure (1919–2013), British writer
- Molly Leishman (born 1998), New Zealand actress
- Molly Lewis (born 1989), American musician
- Molly Lewis (basketball) (born 1989), Australian basketball player
- Molly Lewis (whistler), musical artist
- Molly Line (born 1977), American news correspondent
- Molly Luce (1896–1986), American painter
- Molly Ludlow (born 1987), American middle-distance runner
- Molly Luft (1944–2010), German prostitute and brothel owner

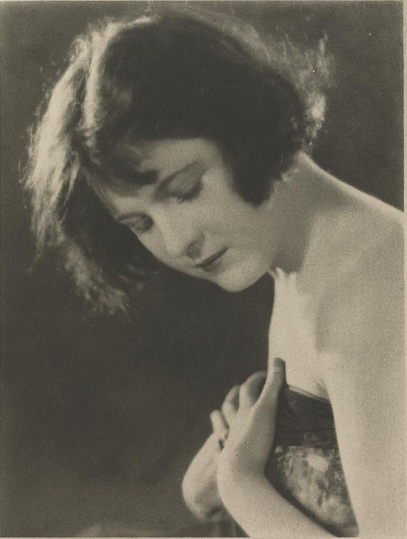
Molly Malone was the stage name of American silent film actress Violet Isabel Malone.

- Molly Macalister (1920–1979), New Zealand artist
- Molly MacArthur (1893–1972), English artist and stage designer
- Molly K. Macauley (1957–2016), American economist
- Mary MacCarthy (1882–1953), British writer associated with the "Bloomsbury Group"
- Molly Murphy MacGregor, American educator
- Molly Macindoe, American/New Zealander photographer and photojournalist
- Molly Mackey (born 1992), American softball player and coach
- Molly Maguires, 19th century secret society in Ireland
- Molly Mahood (1919–2017), British literary scholar
- Molly Malone Cook (1925–2005), American photographer and partner to Mary Oliver
- Molly Malone (1888–1952), stage name of American actress Violet Malone
- Molly F. Mare (1914–1997), British marine biologist
- Molly Marples (1908–1998), microbial ecologist
- Molly Mason, American musician and composer
- Molly Mathews, Australian basketball player
- Molly Mayeux, American producer
- Molly McCann (born 1990), English mixed martial artist
- Molly McCloskey (born 1964), American writer
- Molly McClure (1919–2008), American actress
- Mollie McConnell (1865–1920), American theater and silent film actress
- Molly McCook (born 1990), American actress
- Molly McGee (1952–1994), American gridiron football player
- Molly S. McGlennen, American poet
- Molly McGlynn, Canadian film and television director and screenwriter
- Molly McGrann, American poet
- Molly McGrath (born 1989), American sportscaster and studio host
- Molly McGreevy (1936–2015), American actress
- Molly McGuire, American musician
- Molly McKay, American lawyer
- Molly McKenna (born 2006), British trampoline gymnast
- Molly McMichael, (born c. 1992), American actress
- Molly McQuade, American poet, critic and editor
- Molly Meacher, Baroness Meacher (born 1940), British politician
- Molly Meech (born 1993), New Zealand sailor
- Molly Meldrum (1943–2026), Australian music journalist and media personality
- Molly Menchel (born 1991), American soccer player
- Molly Meyvisch (born 1995), Belgian cyclist
- Molly A. Michael, American political operative
- Molly Miller, American women's college basketball coach
- Molly Molloy (1940–2016), American dancer, choreographer, and teacher
- Molly Moore (disambiguation), several people
- Molly Morgan (c. 1762–1835), convict transported to Australia, landowner and farmer
- Molly R. Morris (born 1956), American ecologist
- Molly Morse, American civil engineer
- Molly Jugadai Napaltjarri (c. 1954–2011), Australian artist
- Molly Nesbit (born 1952), American art critic and editor
- Molly Neuman (born 1972), American drummer
- Molly Newman, American television writer and producer
- Molly Nilsson (born 1984), Swedish singer songwriter and musician
- Molly Nutley (born 1995), Swedish actress
- Molly Nyman, British composer
- Molly O'Day (1909–1998), American actress
- Molly O'Day (singer) (1923–1987), American country music singer songwriter
- Molly O'Keefe, American novelist
- Molly O'Neill (1952–2019), American food writer, cookbook author and journalist
- Molly O'Reilly, Irish activist
- Mollie Orshansky (1915–2006), American economist and statistician
- Molly O'Toole, American immigration and security reporter

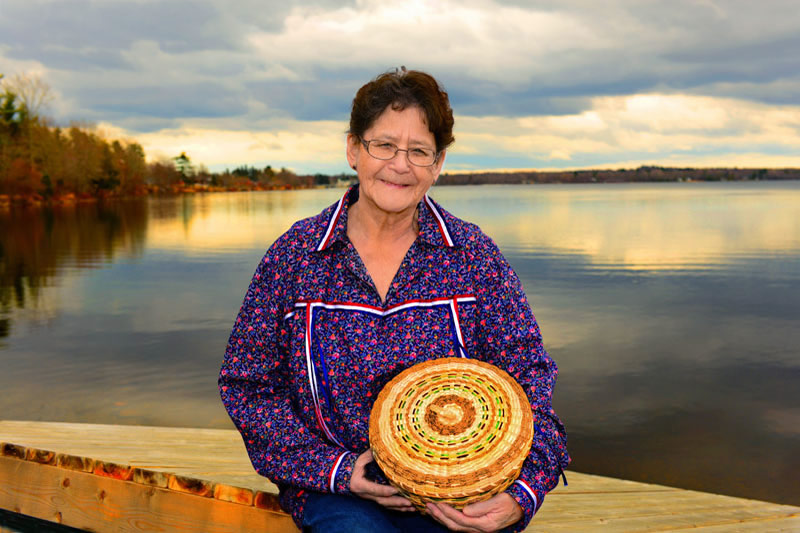
Molly Neptune Parker, American basket weaver

- Molly Parden, American folk musician
- Molly Neptune Parker (1939–2020), American basketweaver
- Molly Parker (born 1972), Canadian actress
- Molly Parkin (1932–2026), Welsh painter, novelist and journalist
- Molly Peacock (born 1947), American-Canadian poet, essayist and creative non-fiction writer
- Molly Pearson (1875–1959), Scottish stage actress
- Molly Penfold, New Zealand cricketer
- Molly Pesce (born 1963), American actress
- Molly Peters, English actress and model
- Mollie Phillips (1907–1994), British figure skater
- Molly Picklum, Australian professional surfer
- Molly Picon (née Małka Opiekun; 1898–1992), American actress in Yiddish theatre and film
- Molly Pike (born 2001), English footballer

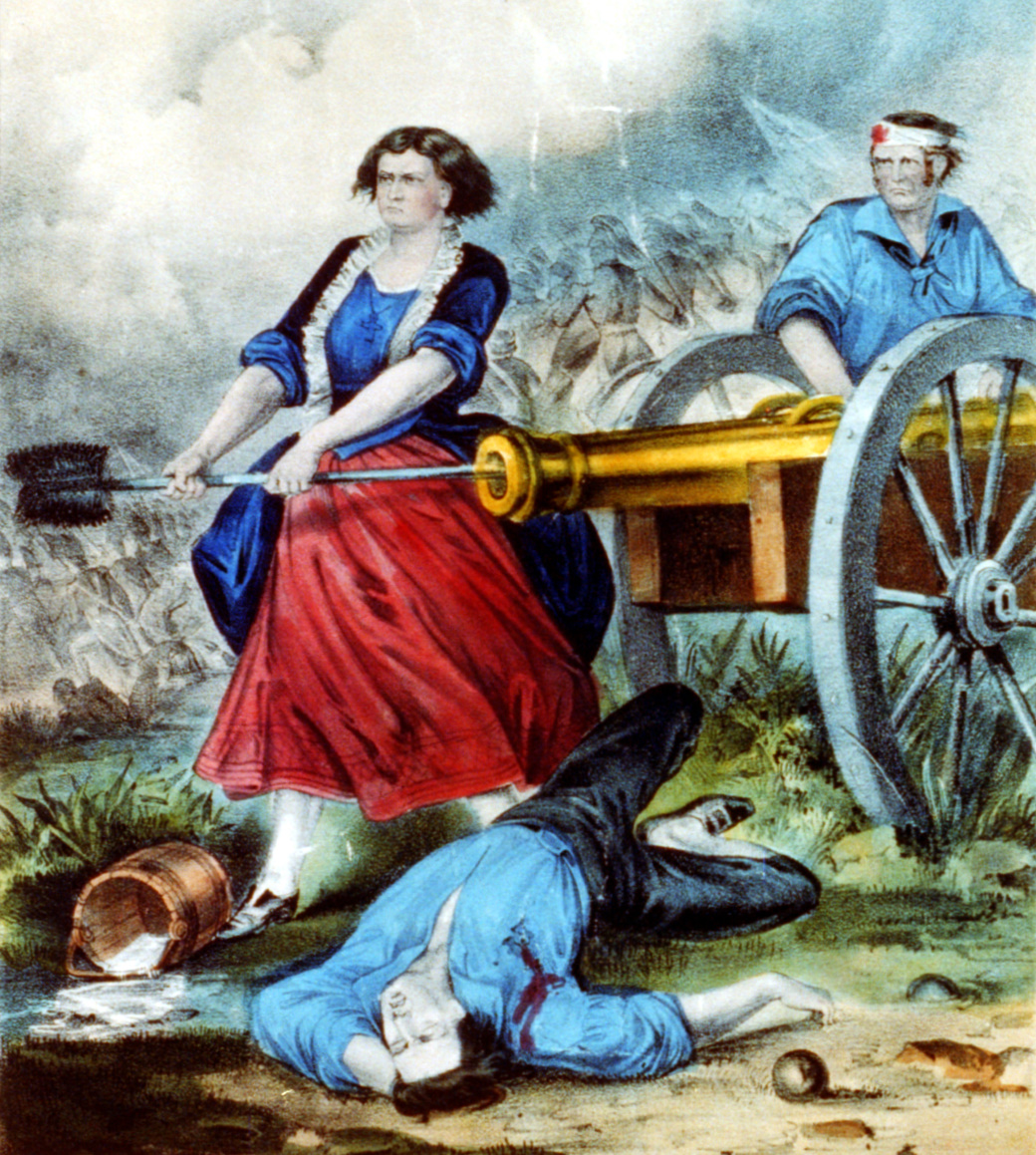
Molly Pitcher is a heroine of the American Revolutionary War.

- Molly Pitcher, nickname of a woman said to have fought in the American Revolutionary War Battle of Monmouth, generally believed to have been Mary Ludwig Hays McCauley
- Molly Poppinz, Australian drag performer
- Molly Price (born 1966), American actress
- Molly Przeworski, American population geneticist
- Molly Qerim (born 1984), American sports anchor
- Molly C. Quinn (born 1993), American actress
- Molly Quinn (born 1993), American actress
- Molly Rainford (born 2000), English actress and singer
- Molly M. Raiser, American politician
- Molly Ranson, American actress and singer
- Molly Rapert (born 1963), marketing academic
- Molly Raphael, American librarian
- Molly Rawn (born 1982), American business executive and politician
- Molly Raynor (1905–1976), New Zealand-born actress
- Molly Reilly (1922–1980), Canadian pilot
- Molly Renshaw (born 1996), English swimmer
- Molly Reynolds, Australian producer, screenwriter and director
- Molly Rhone (born 1944), Jamaican politician
- Molly Rangiwai-McHale (born 1985), New Zealand artist
- Molly Ringwald (born 1968), American actress, singer, and dancer
- Molly Ritson (born 1999), Australian rules footballer
- Molly Robson (born 1942), Australian politician
- Molly Rush, American activist

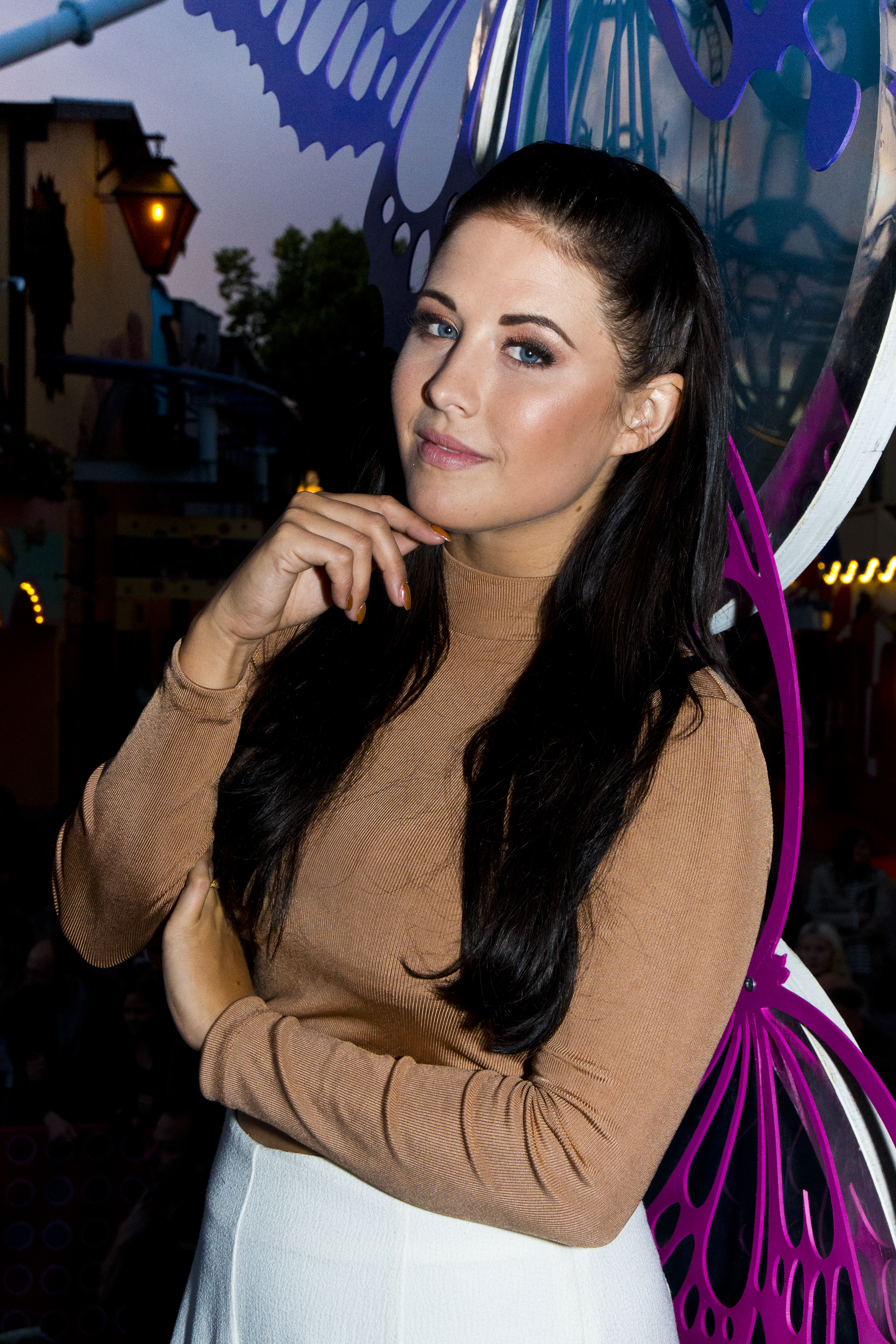
Molly Sandén, Swedish singer

- Molly Samuel-Leport (born 1961), British karateka
- Molly Sandén (born 1992), Swedish singer
- Molly Sarlé, American musician
- Molly Schaus (born 1988), American ice hockey goaltender and coach
- Molly Schumer, American scientist
- Molly Schuyler (born 1979), American competitive eater
- Molly Scott, several people
- Molly Scuffil-McCabe (born 1995), Irish rugby union player
- Molly Searcy (born 1986), American voice actress
- Molly Seaton, Northern Irish footballer
- Molly Elliot Seawell (1860–1916), American dramatist
- Molly Secours, American film producer
- Molly Seidel (born 1994), American long-distance runner
- Molly Shannon (born 1964), American comic actress
- Molly Shattuck (born c. 1967), American socialite and oldest NFL cheerleader
- Molly Shoichet, Canadian biomedical engineer
- Molly Silfen (born 1980), American judge
- Molly Simpson (born 2002), Canadian track cyclist
- Molly Sims (born 1973), American model and actress
- Mary Mollie Skinner (1876–1955), Australian Quaker, nurse and writer
- Molly Smith, American theatre director
- Molly Smith (producer) (born 1973), American film producer
- Molly Smitten-Downes (born 1987), British singer-songwriter
- Molly Smolen, American ballet dancer
- Mary "Mollie" Sneden (1709–1810), ferry operator before and after the American Revolution
- Molly Soda (born 1989), performance artist
- Molly Spearman (born 1954), American teacher and politician
- Molly Spotted Elk (1903–1977), American actress
- Molly Springfield (born 1977), American artist
- Molly Stanton (born 1980), American actress
- Molly Stark (1737–1814), American Revolutionary War figure
- Marthe "Mollie" Steimer (1897–1980), Russian-American anarchist, trade unionist, anti-war activist and free-speech campaigner
- Molly Sterling (born 1998), Irish singer and songwriter
- Molly Stevens (born 1974), British academic
- Molly Strano (born 1992), Australian cricketer
- Mollie Sugden (1922–2009), British actress
- Molly Sullivan French (born 1979), American team reporter
- Molly Sullivan Sliney (born 1966), American fencer
- Molly Summerhayes (born 1997), British freestyle skier
- Molly DeWolf Swenson, American film producer

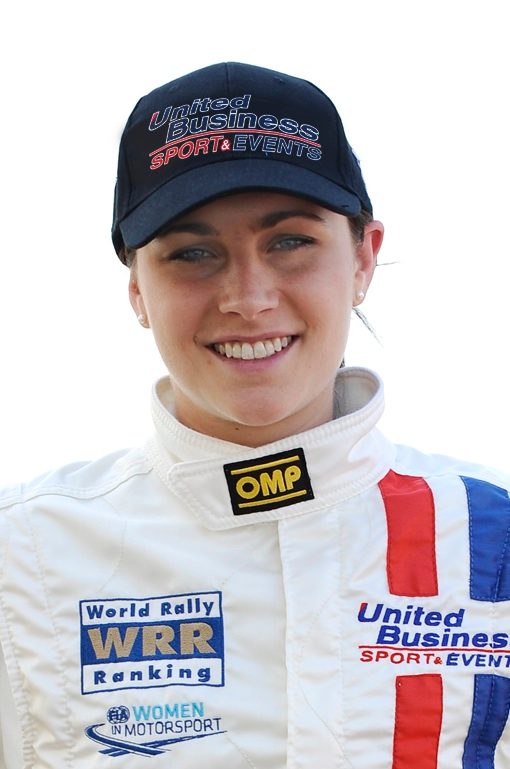
Molly Taylor, Australian racing driver

- Molly Tanzer (born 1981), American writer
- Molly Tarlov (born 1986), American actress
- Molly Tay (born 1952), Singaporean swimmer
- Molly Taylor (born 1988), Australian racing driver
- Mememolly (born Molly Templeton in 1989), British-Canadian Internet personality
- Molly Thompson-Smith (born 1997), British rock climber
- Mollie Tibbetts (1998–2018), American murder victim
- Molly Turner (1923–2016), American journalist
- Molly Tuttle (born 1993), American singer and musician
- Molly Upton (1953–1977), American painter, sculptor, and quilter
- Molly Urquhart (1906–1977), Scottish actress
- Molly O'Bryan Vandemoer (born 1979), American sailor
- Molly Van Nostrand (born 1965), American tennis player
- Molly Verney (1675–1696), British artist
- Molly Walker, English footballer
- Molly Manning Walker, British cinematographer, screenwriter and director
- Molly Watcke (born 1971), American long-distance runner
- Molly Weaver (born 1994), British cyclist
- Molly Weir (1910–2004), Scottish actress
- Molly White (born 1993), American software engineer
- Molly White (politician) (born 1958), American politician in the Texas House of Representatives
- Molly Wieland, English diver
- Molly Williams, first known female and Black firefighter in the U.S.
- Molly Williamson, American diplomat
- Molly Windsor (born 1997), British actress
- Molly Wizenberg, American chef, entrepreneur and writer
- Molly Wood (born 1975), American executive editor and writer
- Molly Worthen, American politician and journalist
- Molly Wright, several people
- Molly Yard (1912–2005), American feminist
- Molly Yeh (born 1989), American chef
- Molly Yestadt, American fashion designer
- Molly Zuckerman-Hartung, American painter

== Fictional characters ==
=== In television and film ===
- Molly Carter, from The Young and the Restless
- Molly Collins, from The Amazing World of Gumball
- Molly Cunningham, from TaleSpin
- Molly Davis, from Toy Story
- Molly Dobbs, from Coronation Street
- Molly Flynn-Biggs, from Mike & Molly
- Molly Harper, from Final Destination 5
- Molly Hooper, from Sherlock
- Molly Lansing-Davis, from General Hospital
- Nurse Molly March, from Camp Candy
- Molly McGee, from The Ghost and Molly McGee
- Molly O'Brien, from Star Trek: The Next Generation and Star Trek: Deep Space Nine
- Molly Solverson, from Fargo (TV series)
- Molly Walker, from Heroes (American TV series)
- Molly Weasley, from the Harry Potter franchise
- Eva "Molly" Wei, from Ōban Star-Racers
- Molly, from Buffy the Vampire Slayer
- Molly, from Friends and Joey

=== In books and comics ===
- Milly-Molly-Mandy from the books by Joyce Lankester Brisley
- Molly Millions (also known as Sally Shears), from the stories and novels by William Gibson
- Molly McIntire, protagonist from the American Girl series
- Molly Moon, from the Molly Moon series
- Molly Weasley, from the Harry Potter series
- Molly Bloom, wife of Leopold Bloom in James Joyce's Ulysses
- Mollie, from the novel Animal Farm
- Molly Mallard, a Disney character who is Scrooge McDuck's paternal grandmother

=== In music ===
- Molly Malone, a mythical 19th-century Irish fishmonger and associated folk song and statue

== Animals ==
- Polly and Molly, cloned sheep

== See also ==
- Moll (disambiguation)
- Mollie (disambiguation)
- Molly (disambiguation)
- Molly Mormon, a stereotype of a Latter-day Saints woman
