= Macindoe =

Macindoe is a surname. Notable people with the surname include:

- David Macindoe (1917–1986), English cricketer
- Flowerdew Macindoe (1865–1932), Scottish rugby union player
- Molly Macindoe (born 1979), American photographer
- Tim Macindoe (born 1961), New Zealand politician

== See also ==
- McIndoe
