= Molly O'Reilly =

Molly O'Reilly may refer to:

- Molly O'Reilly (activist) (1900–1950), Irish republican, socialist activist, and soldier
- Molly O'Reilly (character), fictional character in the comic-book series The Books of Magic

== See also ==
- Molly Reilly (1922–1980), Canadian airline pilot
