= Jacqui Naidoo =

Australian cricketer

Personal information
- Full name: Jacqui Naidoo
- Batting: Right-handed
- Bowling: Right-arm medium
- Role: Bowler

Domestic team information
- Years: Team
- 2021/22: Western Australia

Career statistics
Competition	WLA
Matches	2
Runs scored	2
Batting average	2.00
100s/50s	0/0
Top score	2*
Balls bowled	90
Wickets	1
Bowling average	102.00
5 wickets in innings	0
10 wickets in match	0
Best bowling	1/17
Catches/stumpings	0/–
- Source: CricketArchive, 27 March 2022

Jacqui Naidoo is an Australian cricketer who plays as a right-arm medium bowler. She last played for Western Australia in the Women's National Cricket League (WNCL).

== Domestic career ==
Naidoo made her debut for Western Australia on 27 February 2022, against South Australia in the WNCL. She played one more match for the side that season, also against South Australia two days later, and took her first List A wicket.
