= Alisha Bates =

Australian cricketer

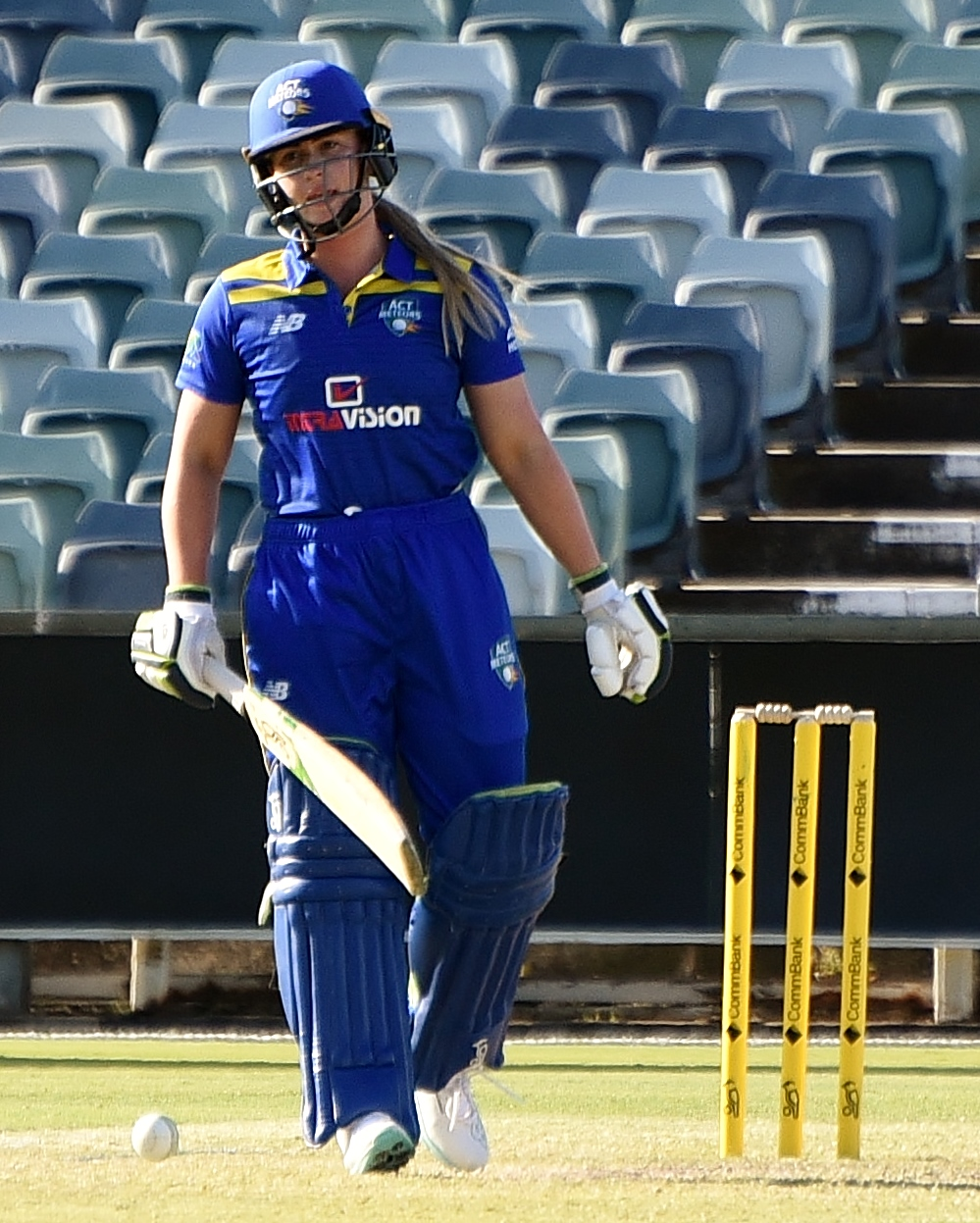
- Bates batting for the ACT in September 2022

Personal information
- Full name: Alisha Joy Bates
- Born: 18 March 2002 (age 24); Gosford, New South Wales, Australia
- Batting: Left-handed
- Bowling: Slow left-arm orthodox
- Role: Bowler

Domestic team information
- Years: Team
- 2019/20: Sydney Sixers
- 2021/22–present: Australian Capital Territory

Career statistics
Competition	WLA	WT20
Matches	28	3
Runs scored	400	45
Batting average	20.00	15.00
100s/50s	0/1	0/0
Top score	66	24
Balls bowled	853	6
Wickets	15	0
Bowling average	51.40	-
5 wickets in innings	0	0
10 wickets in match	0	0
Best bowling	2/24	-
Catches/stumpings	5/–	1/–
- Source: CricketArchive, 16 January 2025

Alisha Joy Bates (born 18 March 2002) is an Australian cricketer who plays as a slow left-arm orthodox bowler for the Australian Capital Territory Meteors in the Women's National Cricket League (WNCL).

== Domestic career ==
Bates was signed by the Sydney Sixers for the 2019–20 Women's Big Bash League season, but did not play a match. In February 2022, she was called-up to the Australian Capital Territory Meteors squad for the restart of the 2021–22 Women's National Cricket League season.

On 22 February 2022 Bates made her debut for Australian Capital Territory, against New South Wales, but the match was abandoned after 1.5 overs. Overall, she played five matches for the side that season, taking four wickets including a best bowling of 2/24, taken against Queensland. She played nine matches for the side in the 2022–23 Women's National Cricket League season, taking six wickets.
