= Molly Lewis =

Molly Lewis may refer to:

- Molly Lewis (whistler) (born March 1990), Australian musician and songwriter
- Molly Lewis (basketball) (born 28 October 1989), Australian basketball player
- Molly Lewis (ukulele player) (born November 23, 1989), American musician and songwriter
