= 2021–22 Women's National Cricket League season =

Cricket tournament

Women's National Cricket League 2021–22 season
- Dates: 17 December 2021 – 27 March 2022
- Administrator: Cricket Australia
- Cricket format: Limited overs cricket (50 overs)
- Tournament format(s): Round-robin and final
- Champions: Tasmania (1st title)
- Runners-up: South Australia
- Participants: 7
- Matches: 29
- Most runs: (South Australia) Courtney Webb (367)
- Most wickets: (Victoria (state)) Samantha Bates (16)
- Official website: cricket.com.au

The 2021–22 Women's National Cricket League season was the 26th season of the Women's National Cricket League, the women's domestic limited overs cricket competition in Australia. The tournament started on 17 December 2021 and finished on 27 March 2022. Queensland were the defending champions. Tasmania won the competition, their first WNCL title, beating South Australia in the final.

Cricket Australia announced the original schedule on 21 July 2021, with the season set to begin on 23 September 2021 and the final to take place on 6 March 2022. However, on 8 September 2021, it was announced that the season start would be delayed until 16 December 2021 following the completion of WBBL/07 due to lockdowns in Sydney and Melbourne and subsequent border restrictions, with a full revised schedule to be released "in due course". The revised fixtures were released on 18 November 2021, with the season set to start with a match between Victoria and ACT Meteors on 16 December 2021 and the final date unchanged. However, on 10 December 2021, it was announced that Western Australia border closures and the need for Meteors players to self-isolate would mean further schedule changes, including the postponement of the original season opener between Victoria and the Meteors until later in the season. Further COVID-related schedule changes, including the pushing back of the final first to 18 March 2022 and subsequently 25 March 2022, were announced on 4 January 2022, 6 January 2022, 8 January 2022 and 11 February 2022.

== Ladder ==
Pos	Team	Pld	W	L	T	MA	BP	Pts	NRR
1	Tasmania	8	7	1	0	0	3	31	0.501
2	South Australia	8	4	2	0	2	3	23	0.455
3	New South Wales	8	4	2	0	2	2	22	0.825
4	Australian Capital Territory	8	4	3	0	1	4	22	0.475
5	Queensland	8	4	3	0	1	3	21	0.169
6	Victoria	8	1	6	0	1	1	7	−1.200
7	Western Australia	8	0	7	0	1	0	2	−1.215

Source: ESPNcricinfo cricket.com.au
Rules for classification: The top two ranked teams qualify for the final.
- Points system: 4 for a win, 2 each for a tie or a no result, 0 for a loss, 2 each for an abandoned match.
- Bonus point system: 1 for win with a run rate 1.25 times that of the opposition.

== Fixtures ==
Match 1
17 December 2021
10:00
Scorecard

Victoria; 8/270 (50 overs)	v	New South Wales; 5/274 (43.1 overs)
Nicole Faltum 88* (83); Hannah Darlington 3/54 (10 overs)		Rachael Haynes 96 (119); Samantha Bates 3/61 (9.1 overs)

New South Wales won by 5 wickets
Junction Oval, St Kilda
Umpires: Daryl Brigham and Lisa McCabe
Player of the match: Rachael Haynes (New South Wales)

- New South Wales won the toss and elected to field.

Match 2
17 December 2021
10:00
Scorecard

Queensland; 8/265 (50 overs)	v	Tasmania; 199 (44.2 overs)
Mikayla Hinkley 72 (94); Heather Graham 3/42 (10 overs)		Nicola Carey 74 (95); Jess Jonassen 5/24 (9.2 overs)

Queensland won by 66 runs
Bellerive Oval, Hobart
Umpires: Muhammad Qureshi and Simon Burns
Player of the match: Jess Jonassen (Queensland)

- Tasmania won the toss and elected to field.

Match 3
19 December 2021
10:00
Scorecard

New South Wales; 300/7 (46 overs)	v	Victoria; 9/229 (35 overs)
Phoebe Litchfield 88 (72); Samantha Bates 2/49 (9 overs)		Ellyse Perry 120 (94); Hannah Darlington 2/37 (7 overs)

New South Wales won by 26 runs (DLS method)
Junction Oval, St Kilda
Umpires: Gaurav Bawa and Chris Grant
Player of the match: Ellyse Perry (Victoria)

- Victoria won the toss and elected to field.
- Victoria were set a revised target of 256 runs from 35 overs due to rain.

Match 4
19 December 2021
10:00
Scorecard

Queensland; 6/223 (48 overs)	v	Tasmania; 5/233 (45.1 overs)
Georgia Redmayne 63 (88); Sarah Coyte 3/40 (9 overs)		Nicola Carey 100* (109); Courtney Sippel 1/34 (9 overs)

Tasmania won by 5 wickets (DLS method)
Bellerive Oval, Hobart
Umpires: Simon Burns and Chris Seabourne
Player of the match: Nicola Carey (Tasmania)

- Tasmania won the toss and elected to field.
- Tasmania were set a revised target of 232 runs from 46 overs due to rain.

Match 5
6 January 2022
10:00
Scorecard

New South Wales; 260 (49.5 overs)	v	Australian Capital Territory; 53 (16 overs)
Rachael Haynes 118 (132); Amy Yates 4/56 (9 overs)		Carly Leeson 12 (24); Stella Campbell 7/25 (8 overs)

New South Wales won by 207 runs
Manuka Oval, Canberra
Umpires: Andrew Scotford and Chris Cassin
Player of the match: Stella Campbell (New South Wales)

- Australian Capital Territory won the toss and elected to field.

Match 6
22 February 2022
14:00 (D/N)
Scorecard

New South Wales; 0/15 (1.5 overs)	v	Australian Capital Territory
Rachel Trenaman 9* (8)

No Result
North Sydney Oval, North Sydney
Umpires: Ben Treloar and Sharad Patel

- Australian Capital Territory won the toss and elected to field.
- Match reduced to 20 overs per side due to rain.
- No further play possible due to rain.

Match 7
25 February 2022
10:00
Scorecard

Victoria; 87 (31.2 overs)	v	Australian Capital Territory; 5/91 (21.3 overes)
Anna Lanning 26* (45); Erin Osborne 4/15 (7.2 overs)		Erica Kershaw 29 (37); Rhys McKenna 3/9 (5 overs)

Australian Capital Territory won by 5 wickets
Junction Oval, St Kilda
Umpires: Gaurav Bawa and Chris Grant
Player of the match: Zoe Cooke (Australian Capital Territory)

- Australian Capital Territory won the toss and elected to field.

Match 8
27 February 2022
10:00
Scorecard

Western Australia; 8/228 (50 overs)	v	South Australia; 8/230 (47.5 overs)
Mathilda Carmichael 75 (83); Samantha Betts 5/46 (10 overs)		Emma de Broughe 58 (87); Amy Edgar 4/35 (10 overs)

South Australia won by 2 wickets
Karen Rolton Oval, Adelaide
Umpires: Dhaval Bhatt and Harry Singh

- South Australia won the toss and elected to field.

Match 9
1 March 2022
10:00
Scorecard

South Australia; 7/296 (50 overs)	v	Western Australia; 210 (46.1 overs)
Emma de Broughe 93 (107); Georgia Wyllie 2/49 (8 overs)		Charis Bekker 36* (45); Samantha Betts 3/29 (8.1 overs)

South Australia won by 86 runs
Karen Rolton Oval, Adelaide
Umpires: Dhaval Bhatt and Harry Singh
Player of the match: Emma de Broughe (South Australia)

- Western Australia won the toss and elected to field.

Match 10
2 March 2022
10:00
Scorecard

Tasmania; 9/212 (50 overs)	v	Victoria; 165 (44.4 overs)
Sarah Coyte 69* (79); Rhys McKenna 3/41 (7 overs)		Kim Garth 35 (55); Sarah Coyte 3/39 (9.4 overs)

Tasmania won by 47 runs
Junction Oval, St Kilda
Umpires: Greg Azzopardi and Lisa McCabe
Player of the match: Sarah Coyte (Tasmania)

- Victoria won the toss and elected to field.

Match 11
6 March 2022
10:00
Scorecard

South Australia; 8/140	v	Queensland
Bridget Patterson 40 (69); Grace Parsons 4/33 (7 overs)

No Result
North Sydney Oval, North Sydney
Umpires: Andrew Hamilton and Bede Sajowitz

- Queensland won the toss and elected to field.
- No further play possible due to rain.

Match 12
6 March 2022
10:00
Scorecard

Western Australia; 6/188 (50 overs)	v	Tasmania; 5/189 (45 overs)
Chloe Piparo 54 (88); Sarah Coyte 2/36 (10 overs)		Emma Manix-Geeves 68 (125); Zoe Britcliffe 3/33 (10 overs)

Tasmania won by 5 wickets
Kippax Oval, Canberra
Umpires: Andrew Scotford and Simon Lightbody
Player of the match: Emma Manix-Geeves (Tasmania)

- Tasmania won the toss and elected to field.

Match 13
8 March 2022
10:00
Scorecard

South Australia	v	New South Wales

Match Abandoned
Hurstville Oval, Sydney

- No toss.
- Match abandoned on 7 March 2022 due to ongoing weather emergency in New South Wales.

Match 14
8 March 2022
10:00
Scorecard

Western Australia	v	Victoria

Match Abandoned
Waverley Oval, Sydney

- No toss.
- Match abandoned on 7 March 2022 due to ongoing weather emergency in New South Wales.

Match 15
9 March 2022
10:00
Scorecard

Tasmania; 7/241 (50 overs)	v	Australian Capital Territory; 222 (48.1 overs)
Rachel Priest 110 (124); Carly Leeson 3/43 (10 overs)		Katie Mack 53 (63); Molly Strano 2/31 (10 overs)

Tasmania won by 19 runs
Phillip Oval, Canberra
Umpires: Dinusha Bandara and Simon Lightbody
Player of the match: Rachel Priest (Tasmania)

- Australian Capital Territory won the toss and elected to field.

Match 16
10 March 2022
10:00
Scorecard

Victoria; 8/180 (50 overs)	v	Queensland; 116 (39.2 overs)
Makinley Blows 64 (138); Courtney Sippel 4/47 (10 overs)		Ellie Johnston 34 (59); Samantha Bates 5/29 (9.2 overs)

Victoria won by 64 runs
Kippax Oval, Canberra
Umpires: Bede Sajowitz and Troy Penman
Player of the match: Samantha Bates (Victoria)

- Victoria won the toss and elected to bat.

Match 17
11 March 2022
10:00
Scorecard

South Australia; 8/222 (50 overs)	v	Tasmania; 5/223 (39.2 overs)
Ellie Falconer 50* (35); Amy Smith 3/47 (10 overs)		Elyse Villani 63 (63); Kate Peterson 2/32 (8 overs)

Tasmania won by 5 wickets
Phillip Oval, Canberra
Umpires: Roberto Howard and Sharad Patel
Player of the match: Molly Strano (Tasmania)

- South Australia won the toss and elected to bat.

Match 18
11 March 2022
9:30
Scorecard

Western Australia; 9/195 (50 overs)	v	New South Wales; 2/196 (39.4 overs)
Amy Edgar 85* (128); Sammy-Jo Johnson 3/39 (7 overs)		Rachel Trenaman 90* (109); Molly Healy 1/28 (7 overs)

New South Wales won by 8 wickets
North Sydney Oval, North Sydney
Umpires: Andrew Hamilton and Bede Sajowitz
Player of the match: Rachel Trenaman (New South Wales)

- New South Wales won the toss and elected to field.

Match 19
13 March 2022
10:00
Scorecard

Australian Capital Territory; 9/224 (50 overs)	v	Queensland; 138 (36.2 overs)
Erin Osborne 58 (102); Georgia Prestwidge 4/24 (10 overs)		Courtney Sippel 54* (90); Zoe Cooke 2/22 (7 overs)

Australian Capital Territory won by 86 runs
Phillip Oval, Canberra
Umpires: Chris Cassin and Dinusha Bandara
Player of the match: Erin Osborne (Australian Capital Territory)

- Queensland won the toss and elected to field.

Match 20
14 March 2022
14:00 (D/N)
Scorecard

New South Wales; 198 (48.3 overs)	v	Tasmania; 6/199 (42.4 overs)
Anika Learoyd 51 (77); Amy Smith 3/32 (8 overs)		Rachel Priest 84 (94); Maitlan Brown 3/31 (8.4 overs)

Tasmania won by 4 wickets
North Sydney Oval, North Sydney
Umpires: Bede Sajowitz and Roberto Howard
Player of the match: Rachel Priest (Tasmania)

- New South Wales won the toss and elected to bat.
- Match reduced to 49 overs per side due to rain.

Match 21
15 March 2022
10:00
Scorecard

Australian Capital Territory; 166 (46 overs)	v	South Australia; 3/167 (35.3 overs)
Erin Osborne 53 (88); Jemma Barsby 3/36 (10 overs)		Courtney Webb 72 (89); Nicola Hancock 2/27 (6 overs)

South Australia won by 7 wickets
Phillip Oval, Canberra
Umpires: Chris Cassin and Stephen Dionysius
Player of the match: Courtney Webb (South Australia)

- South Australia won the toss and elected to field.

Match 22
15 March 2022
10:00
Scorecard

Queensland; 231 (49 overs)	v	Western Australia; 162 (39.3 overs)
Mikayla Hinkley 64 (73); Zoe Britcliffe 5/53 (10 overs)		Maia Bouchier 79 (70); Georgia Voll 3/20 (6 overs)

Queensland won by 69 runs
Chisholm Oval, Canberra
Umpires: Steven Farrell and Simon Lightbody
Player of the match: Georgia Voll (Queensland)

- Queensland won the toss and elected to bat.

Match 23
17 March 2022
10:00
Scorecard

Victoria; 130 (50 overs)	v	Tasmania; 3/131 (31.1 overs)
Rhys McKenna 33 (49); Maisy Gibson 5/19 (10 overs)		Emma Manix-Geeves 37 (70); Tess Flintoff 1/25 (6 overs)

Tasmania won by 7 wickets
Shepley Oval, Dandenong
Umpires: Gaurav Bawa and Greg Azzopardi
Player of the match: Maisy Gibson (Tasmania)

- Victoria won the toss and elected to bat.

Match 24
18 March 2022
10:00
Scorecard

Western Australia; 7/208 (50 overs)	v	Queensland; 7/213 (47.1 overs)
Chloe Piparo 46 (96); Georgia Voll 2/39 (9 overs)		Mikayla Hinkley 121* (141); Piepa Cleary 3/36 (10 overs)

Queensland won by 3 wickets
Chisholm Oval, Canberra
Umpires: Daryl Brigham and Dinusha Bandara
Player of the match: Mikayla Hinkley (Queensland)

- Queensland won the toss and elected to field.

Match 25
18 March 2022
10:00
Scorecard

Australian Capital Territory; 8/282 (50 overs)	v	South Australia; 172 (43 overs)
Katie Mack 107 (134); Ellie Falconer 5/56 (10 overs)		Courtney Webb 57 (79); Chloe Rafferty 3/16 (7 overs)

Australian Capital Territory won by 110 runs
Phillip Oval, Canberra
Umpires: Chris Cassin and Simon Lightbody
Player of the match: Katie Mack (Australian Capital Territory)

- South Australia won the toss and elected to field.

Match 26
20 March 2022
10:00
Scorecard

Western Australia; 117 (37.4 overs)	v	Australian Capital Territory; 4/120 (18.1 overs)
Amy Edgar 24* (45); Zoe Cooke 3/29 (10 overs)		Olivia Porter 58 (41); Amy Edgar 1/13 (3 overs)

Australian Capital Territory won by 6 wickets
Phillip Oval, Canberra
Umpires: Andrew Crozier and Dinusha Bandara
Player of the match: Erin Osborne (Australian Capital Territory)

- Western Australia won the toss and elected to bat.

Match 27
21 March 2022
10:00
Scorecard

South Australia; 5/264 (50 overs)	v	Victoria; 139 (43.3 overs)
Bridget Patterson 118 (138); Kim Garth 3/42 (10 overs)		Anna Lanning 40 (82); Ellie Falconer 4/30 (8.3 overs)

South Australia won by 125 runs
Junction Oval, St Kilda
Umpires: Chris Grant and Lisa McCabe
Player of the match: Bridget Patterson (South Australia)

- South Australia won the toss and elected to bat.

Match 28
22 March 2022
10:00
Scorecard

Queensland; 7/214 (50 overs)	v	New South Wales; 9/152 (50 overs)
Georgia Voll 52 (82); Sammy-Jo Johnson 2/42 (6 overs)		Angelina Genford 45* (62); Charli Knott 3/24 (10 overs)

Queensland won by 62 runs
Hurstville Oval, Hurstville
Umpires: Andrew Hamilton and Bede Sajowitz
Player of the match: Charli Knott (Queensland)

- Queensland won the toss and elected to bat.

== Final ==
27 March 2022
10:30
Scorecard

South Australia; 242/8 (50 overs)	v	Tasmania; 245/1 (47.4 overs)
Courtney Webb 88 (78); Amy Smith 3/33 (7 overs)		Elyse Villani 111* (124); Samantha Betts 1/42 (8 overs)

Tasmania won by 9 wickets
Bellerive Oval, Hobart
Umpires: Ben Treloar and Simon Lightbody
Player of the match: Elyse Villani (Tasmania)

- South Australia won the toss and elected to bat.

== Statistics ==
=== Highest totals ===
Team	Score	Against	Venue	Date
New South Wales	7/300	Victoria	Junction Oval	19 December 2021
South Australia	7/296	Western Australia	Karen Rolton Oval	1 March 2022
Australian Capital Territory	8/282	South Australia	Phillip Oval	18 March 2022
New South Wales	5/274	Victoria	Junction Oval	17 December 2021
Victoria	8/270	New South Wales	Junction Oval	17 December 2021

=== Most runs ===
Player	Team	Mat	Inns	NO	Runs	HS	Ave	BF	SR	100	50
Courtney Webb	South Australia	8	8	0	367	88	45.87	421	87.17	0	4
Elyse Villani	Tasmania	9	9	1	356	111*	44.50	471	75.58	1	2
Mikayla Hinkley	Queensland	8	7	1	319	121*	53.16	415	76.86	1	2
Rachel Priest	Tasmania	9	9	0	309	110	34.33	419	73.74	1	1
Emma Manix-Geeves	Tasmania	9	9	2	300	104*	42.85	529	56.71	1	1

=== Most wickets ===
Player	Team	Mat	Inns	Overs	Mdns	Runs	Wkts	BBI	Ave	SR	4WI
Samantha Bates	Victoria	7	7	61.3	4	269	16	5/29	16.81	23.0	1
Ellie Falconer	South Australia	8	7	61.3	3	288	14	5/56	20.57	26.3	2
Georgia Prestwidge	Queensland	8	8	60.0	4	250	13	4/42	19.23	27.6	1
Maisy Gibson	Tasmania	9	9	73.0	5	288	13	5/19	22.15	33.6	1
Sarah Coyte	Tasmania	8	8	71.4	3	299	13	3/39	23.00	33.0	0
