= Girls on the Run =

American youth organization

Girls on the Run International
- Formation: 1996
- Type: positive youth development
- Legal status: Non-profit federated organization, with separate non-profit chapters.
- Purpose: holistic health outcomes for girls
- Headquarters: Charlotte, North Carolina, U.S.A.
- Region served: United States
- CEO: Elizabeth Kunz
- Main organ: Board of Directors
- Website: www.girlsontherun.org

Girls on the Run (also referred to as Girls on the Run International), a national non-profit organization, designs programming that strengthens third- to eighth-grade girls’ social, emotional, physical and behavioral skills to successfully navigate life experiences. The program’s intentional curriculum places an emphasis on developing competence, confidence, connection, character, caring, and contribution in young girls through lessons that incorporate running and other physical activities. The life skills curriculum is delivered by caring and competent coaches who are trained to teach lessons as intended.

Local chapters (called "councils") operate under an umbrella organization, Girls on the Run International, which provides the curricula, training and support needed to successfully implement Girls on the Run (GOTR) within local communities.

== Mission ==
The organization describes its mission as follows: "We inspire girls to be joyful, healthy and confident using a fun, experience-based curriculum which creatively integrates running." It further describes a vision: "We envision a world where every girl knows and activates her limitless potential and is free to boldly pursue her dreams."

== History ==
The Girls on the Run program was founded in Charlotte, North Carolina, by educator and Ironman triathlete Molly Barker in 1996. She was inspired by her own childhood experiences and her work as a teacher and coach. What started as a local program serving 13 girls has grown into a national force for good, positively impacting the lives of more than two million girls over the past 25 years.

In 2000, Girls on the Run was established as a 501c3 nonprofit organization.

In 2008, the Girls on the Run 5K series was established. Each season ends with a celebratory 5K event, with over 350 5Ks taking place annually, the Girls on the Run 5K series is the largest of its kind in the nation.

In 2016, an independent study conducted by Maureen Weiss, Ph.D., University of Minnesota provided strong evidence that Girls on the Run is effective in promoting positive youth development, including season-long and lasting change in competence, confidence, connection, character, caring, physical activity, and life skills. A summary report gives an overview of findings, and two peer-reviewed articles published in Pediatric Exercise Science detail the methods, results and demonstrated impact of Girls on the Run in positively influencing life skills learning, social and emotional development, and healthy behaviors. Improvements were especially strong for girls who started the season with lower scores than their peers.

In 2017, Girls on the Run was Named “Most Influential in Health and Wellness” by the National AfterSchool Association

In 2019, Girls on the Run was recognized as a featured Bright Spot organization in the U.S. Health and Human Services' National Youth Sports Strategy. Additionally, in 2020, Girls on the Run has had the privilege of being selected to serve as a U.S. National Youth Sports Strategy Champion and was a finalist for the prestigious Robert Wood Johnson Sports Award.

In 2021, Girls on the Run expanded to Ottawa, Canada. Two sites were established and served 20 girls.

== Program ==
Girls on the Run operates three programs for its participants "Girls on the Run" for 3rd–5th graders (approximately 8 through 11 years old), "Heart & Sole" for 6th–8th graders (11 through 14 years old), and Camp GOTR for rising 3rd - 5th graders.

Girls on the Run, Heart & Sole and Camp GOTR are physical activity-based positive youth development (PYD) programs that are designed to enhance girls’ social, emotional and physical skills and behaviors to successfully navigate life experiences. Leading experts in positive youth development create structured and dynamic lessons that use running and other physical activities to promote and support healthy outcomes for girls. The life skills curriculum is delivered by caring and competent coaches who are trained to teach lessons as intended.

=== Girls on the Run ===
Girls on the Run is an after-school program designed to inspire girls of all abilities to recognize and embrace their inner strength. Lessons emphasize the important connection between physical and emotional health. At the end of the program, girls complete a 5K, which provides a tangible sense of accomplishment, setting a confident and goal-oriented mindset into motion.

The Girls on the Run program uses a whole person approach to elevate the social-emotional and physical well-being of each girl. The curriculum has an intentional focus on social-emotional learning in each of the 20 lessons participants go through, as social-emotional learning (SEL) has been shown to provide short- and long-term benefits to children such as positive social behavior, less emotional stress, and academic success. Through the program, girls learn critical life skills and behaviors such as how to manage emotions, help others, make intentional decisions, and resolve conflict that create resiliency and are skills that girls can use at home, at school, and with friends long after the program's conclusion. Girls on the Run also inspires girls to build lives of purpose and to make a meaningful contribution to community and society. This message comes to life through a key element of the curricula when each team creates and executes a community service project. The season concludes with a celebratory 5K event. Completing a 5K gives the girls a tangible sense of achievement as well as a framework for setting and achieving life goals.

=== Heart & Sole ===
The need for quality physical activity-based positive youth development (PYD) programs for Middle School girls is high. As girls mature from childhood to adolescence, levels of physical activity decline and risk for unhealthy outcomes like obesity, diabetes and depression may occur in the short and long term. Multiple factors are associated with lower physical activity among girls at this age such as perceived physical competence, self-esteem, and parental and peer support. In response to this need, Girls on the Run launched Heart & Sole, its program for middle school girls.

Heart & Sole is a program for middle school girls that includes social-emotional learning and life skills development. The curriculum covers topics such as team building, establishing support systems, boundary setting, and decision-making. The program includes activities related to interpersonal connections and adolescent development.

This program is accessible to all girls regardless of fitness level and considers the range of ages and varied experiences of middle schoolers. Physical activity includes strength and conditioning appropriate for this age group. As with the elementary program, Girls on the Run, the Heart & Sole season culminates with the Girls on the Run 5K, which is the celebratory event that underscores the confidence, competence, connection, character and caring the girls have been developing in the program and gives them a tangible sense of achievement.

=== Camp GOTR ===
Camp GOTR is an out-of-school program for girls in 3rd to 5th grade operated by Girls on the Run. The program includes activities such as interactive games, physical activity, storytelling, and arts and crafts. The camp is led by coaches and incorporates elements of the Girls on the Run curriculum in a camp setting.

== Impact ==
In 2016, an independent study conducted by Dr. Maureen Weiss and her research team evaluated the impact of Girls on the Run on positive youth development. The study also looked at how Girls on the Run participants differ from a comparison group of girls in physical education or organized sports programs on developmental outcomes and life skills. The study found that:

1. Girls made their greatest gains in confidence and connection. They improved in how much they liked the kind of person they are and how happy they felt with the way they looked, and were more likely to say they have classmates who like them the way they are.
2. Girls who began the program with below-average scores significantly improved from pre- to post-season on all outcomes—competence, confidence, connection, character, and caring.
3. Girls who were the least active at the start of the season increased their physical activity level by 40% from pre- to post-season and maintained this increased level beyond season’s end.
4. Almost all girls (97%) said they learned critical life skills including managing emotions, resolving conflict, helping others or making intentional decisions at Girls on the Run that they are using at home, at school and with their friends
5. Girls in Girls on the Run were significantly more likely than girls in physical education or organized sports programs to learn and use life skills including managing emotions, resolving conflict, helping others and intentional decision making.
