= The Oasis Center for Women and Girls =

Educational organization

Oasis is a national, nonprofit educational organization that promotes healthy aging and reduces social isolation among older adults through lifelong learning, active lifestyles and volunteer engagement. Offering stimulating programs in health and wellness, arts, humanities, technology and volunteer service, Oasis brings people together to learn, lead and contribute to their communities. The Oasis Institute in St. Louis is the national headquarters. The organization offers programs in 40 cities, including nine Oasis education centers.

Created in 1982 by Marylen Mann and a group of volunteers and educators, the organization was originally funded for two years by the U.S. Administration on Aging. The original four centers were in St. Louis, Baltimore, Los Angeles, and Cleveland. The May Department Stores Company provided space for Oasis classes in its stores. In Nashville, activist Molly Secours worked with the Oasis Center to help African-American and Latino youth learn life skills via videos. It celebrates Women's History Month. In Newport Beach, California the Oasis Center served 12,000 people by sponsoring educational classes, fitness activities, transportation and special events. It runs talent shows to raise money for causes that it supports; one cause is helping teenage girls cope with negative feelings of self-worth acquired from exposure to social media. Oasis is sponsored by individuals, corporate and private foundations.
