= Nicole Hunt =

Australian basketball player

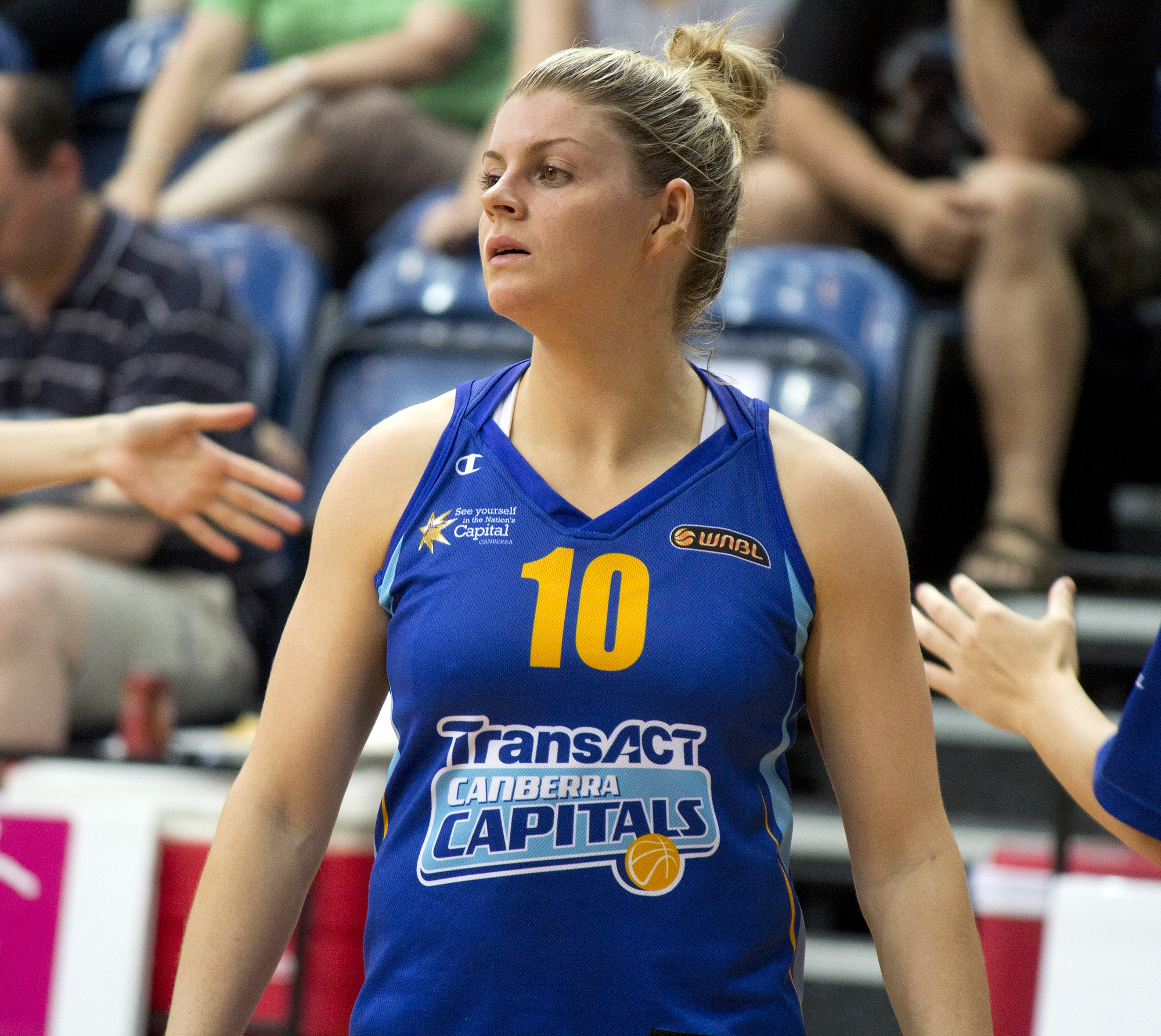
- Hunt during a game between the Capitals and Logan Thunder at AIS Arena

No. 10 – Canberra Capitals
- Position: Guard
- League: WNBL

Personal information
- Born: 15 October 1988 (age 38) Warrnambool, Victoria, Australia
- Listed height: 1.67 m (5 ft 6 in)

Nicole Hunt (born 15 October 1988) is an Australian basketball player from Victoria. She has played for the Australian Institute of Sport, Dandenong Rangers and Canberra Capitals in Australia's Women's National Basketball League (WNBL). She has also made appearances on the Australia women's national basketball team.

== Personal ==
Hunt was born on 15 October 1988 in Warrnambool, Victoria. She is 167 centimetres (66 in) tall. She is the eldest of three children, and has a brother and a sister.

== Australian Institute of Sport ==
Hunt played for the Australian Institute of Sport's WNBL team from 2006 to 2008. At the end of the 2007/2008 season, she was named the WNBL's Rookie of the Year.

== Dandenong Rangers ==
Hunt played for the Dandenong Rangers from 2008 to 2010. In a January 2008 game against the Bendigo Spirit, Hunt won the game for the Rangers with a three-point shot during overtime.

== Canberra Capitals ==
Hunt wears number 10 and plays guard for the Canberra Capitals. On the team, she has the nickname of Flea.

=== 2010/2011 ===
Hunt played for the Caps during the 2010/2011 season. The team's coach, Carrie Graf, believed Hunt's performance was one of the reasons the team did so well that season. Her 22nd birthday was on the day the team played the Sydney Uni Flames, in a game when they came from behind to secure victory and Hunt scored 18 points. In a November 2010 game against the Bendigo Spirit, she and Nicole Romeo were in charge of and were successful in largely shutting down Kristi Harrower. In a December 2010 game against the Townsville Fire, she scored 10 points and tied for the team's second highest score in a game the Capitals lost. During the 2010/2011 season, she would sometimes play point guard, and The Canberra Times described her as being a threat on the perimeter. At the immediate end of the season, she was one of several players from the 2010/2011 squad who did not have a contract with the team for the 2011/2012 season.

=== 2011/2012 ===
Canberra Capitals vs Townsville. Hunt is the short player in blue

Hunt participated in the team's first training session for the season on 13 September 2011 at the Belconnen Basketball Centre. During the preseason, she had a case of tonsillitis. In an October game against the Bulleen Boomers, she scored 12 points before leaving the game with an ankle injury. In a 13 November 2011 game against the West Coast Waves, she scored 14 points. On 18 December 2011, 85–78 victory over the Bulleen Boomers, she scored 14 points, and was one of Canberra's top three scorers.

== SEABL ==
Hunt played for the Launceston Tornadoes team in the SEABL with Capitals teammate Molly Lewis in 2011.

== National team ==
Hunt was named to the squad that competed in the 2012 Summer Olympics qualifying tournament. She was part of the 2011 squad that competed against New Zealand and China. During the tournament, she wore the number 5 jersey.
