= Molly Scott =

Molly Scott may refer to:

- Molly Scott Cato (born 1963), British politician
- Molly Scott (athlete), Irish track and field athlete
- Molly Scott (actress), American actress
- Molly Scott (singer)
