= Molly Ladd-Taylor =

Canadian historian

- Born: June 27, 1955 (age 71)

Academic background
- Education: BA, Oberlin College; MA, American Studies, Case Western Reserve University; PhD, American Studies, 1986, Yale University
- Thesis: Mother-work: ideology, public policy and the mothers' movement, 1890-1930 (1986)

Academic work
- Institutions: York University

Molly Madeleine Ladd-Taylor FRSC (born June 27, 1955) is a Canadian historian. Having moved to Canada during the 1990s, she is a professor of history at York University and a Fellow of the Royal Society of Canada. Her research focuses on the histories of women's health, maternal and child welfare policy, and eugenics in the United States.

== Early life and education ==
Ladd-Taylor was born on June 27, 1955. She attended Oberlin College for her Bachelor of Arts degree and enrolled at Case Western Reserve University for her Master's degree in American studies. She remained in the United States until she finished her PhD from Yale University. As a young adult in the 1980s, her mother suffered from Granulomatosis with polyangiitis and was treated by Anthony Fauci, who had just become the director of the National Institute of Allergy and Infectious Diseases.

== Career ==
Upon completing her PhD, Ladd-Taylor joined the history faculty at York University. While there, she published her first book titled Raising a Baby the Government Way: Mothers' Letters to the Children's Bureau, 1915–1932 through the Rutgers University Press in 1986. The book was a collection of letters from women around the United States detailing motherhood difficulties, including death and diet, between World War I and the end of the 1920s. A few years later, she published another book titled Mother-Work: Women, Child Welfare, and the State, 1890-1930 through the University of Illinois Press.

In 2017, Ladd-Taylor published Fixing the Poor: Eugenic Sterilization and Child Welfare in the Twentieth Century through the Johns Hopkins University Press. The book focused on the history of Eugenics in the United States as depicted in institutional and medical records, court cases, newspapers and professional journals. It was shortlisted for the 2019 Wallace K. Ferguson Book Award as an "outstanding scholarly book in a field of history other than Canadian history." During this time, she was also promoted to Full Professor in York University's Department of History.

During the 2019–20 academic year, Ladd-Taylor won a Social Sciences and Humanities Research Council Insight Grant to fund her research project "Damaged Children, Innocence, Inequality and the Politics of Poverty in the Postwar United States, 1950-90." As a result of her accomplishments, Ladd-Taylor was elected a Fellow of the Royal Society of Canada in 2020.

== Selected publications ==
- Raising a Baby the Government Way: Mothers' Letters to the Children's Bureau, 1915-1932 (1986)
- Mother-Work: Women, Child Welfare, and the State, 1890-1930 (1994)
- Root of Bitterness: Documents of the Social History of American Women (1996)
- 'Bad' Mothers: The Politics of Blame in 20th-Century America (1998)
- Women, Health and Nation: Canada and the United States Since 1945 (2003)
- Becoming a Historian: A Canadian Manual (2008)
- Fixing the Poor: Eugenic Sterilization and Child Welfare in the Twentieth Century (2017)
