= Emma Manix-Geeves =

Australian cricketer (born 2000)

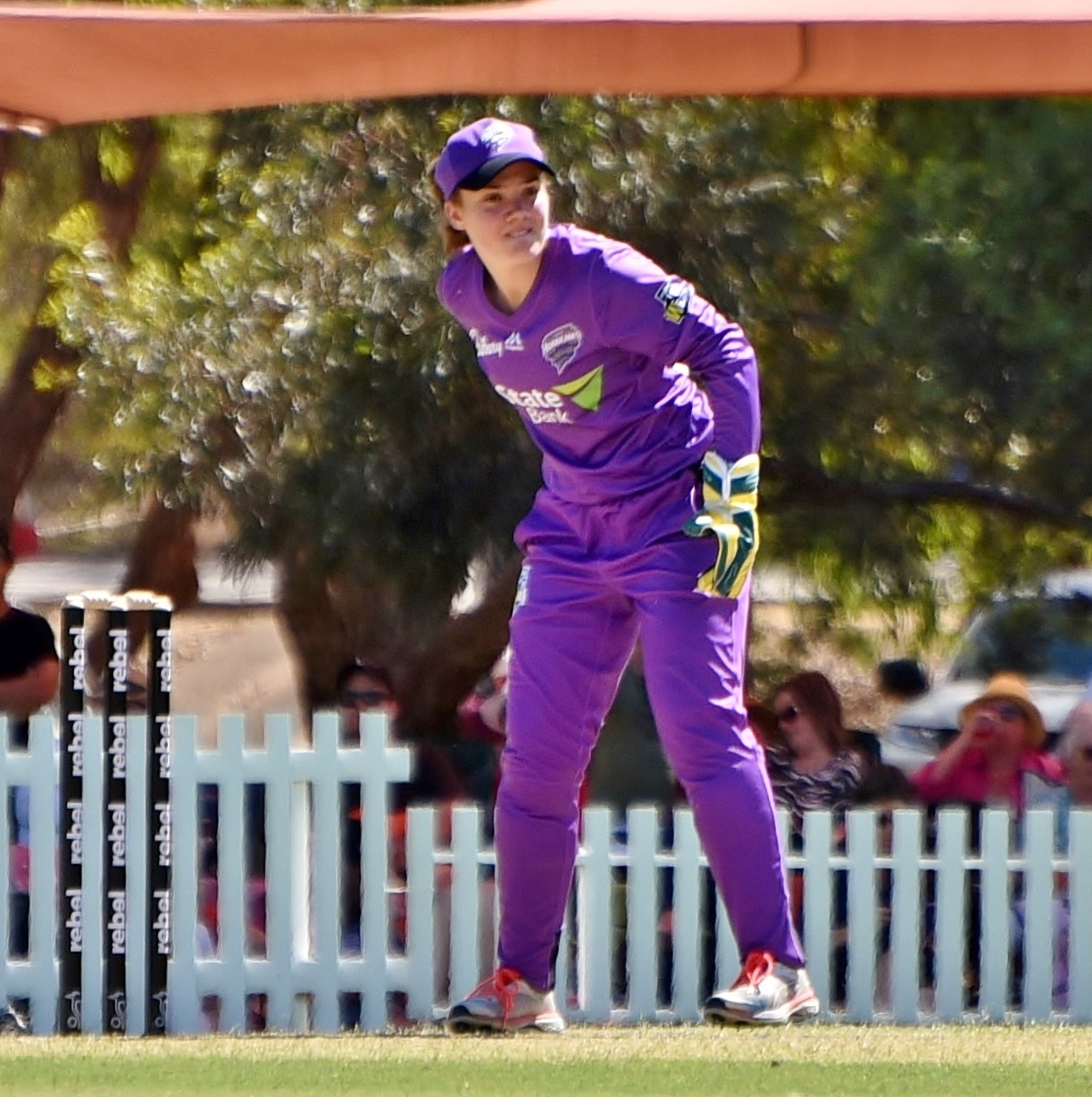
- Manix-Geeves playing for Hobart Hurricanes

Personal information
- Born: 12 August 2000 (age 26)
- Batting: Right-handed
- Bowling: Right-arm off break
- Role: Wicket-keeper

Domestic team information
- Years: Team
- 2018/19–present: Tasmania
- 2019/20: Hobart Hurricanes
- 2022/23–present: Hobart Hurricanes

Career statistics
Competition	WLA	WT20
Matches	47	13
Runs scored	926	81
Batting average	26.76	–
100s/50s	1/6	0/0
Top score	104*	28*
Catches/stumpings	12/5	1/1
- Source: CricketArchive, 26 July 2022

Emma Manix-Geeves (born 12 August 2000) is an Australian cricketer who plays as a right-handed batter and wicket-keeper for the Tasmanian Tigers in the Women's National Cricket League (WNCL). She made her Tasmania debut on 22 September 2019 against Western Australia, making one stumping and scoring two runs. She was a member of the Hobart Hurricanes squad for the 2019–20 Women's Big Bash League season, making five appearances.
