= Molly Carnes =

American physician and academic

- Born: Youngstown, Ohio; 1951 (age 74–75)
- Education: University of Wisconsin–Madison; University of Michigan; University at Buffalo
- Scientific career
- Workplaces: University of Wisconsin–Madison

Mary "Molly" Carnes is an American physician who is a professor in the departments of Medicine, Psychiatry, and Industrial & Systems Engineering at the University of Wisconsin-Madison. She Directs the Center for Women's Health Research, the Women Veterans Health Program, and the Women in Science and Engineering Leadership Institute. Her research looks to develop interventions that increase the participation of people from historically excluded groups in science.

== Early life and education ==
Carnes was born in Youngstown, Ohio. Her parents were both veterans of World War II, and her father was a Unitarian minister. She grew up in Memphis, but moved to Buffalo, New York during the civil rights movement. She attended The Campus School, a progressive, lab-based educational establishment that provided teacher training. She was going to apply for languages, and considered Middlebury College, but eventually applied to the University of Michigan. Her Freshman exams were cancelled due to the Black Action Movement, and Carnes found it difficult to readjust. She eventually dropped out of college, and worked in several short term jobs before realizing she was happier in formal education. She moved to the State University of New York at Buffalo School of Medicine for her medical degree. Carnes specialized in internal medicine and geriatrics at the University of Wisconsin–Madison.

== Research and career ==
Carnes started her career working in geriatrics at the William S. Middleton Memorial Veterans Hospital. She helped to establish the Geriatric Research, Education and Clinical Research Center, which focuses on ageing and Alzheimer's disease. At the time, concepts such as the social determinants of health had yet to be established, and Carnes had to develop a multidisciplinary approach to support her patients. The United States Department of Veterans Affairs recognised that only 15% of the United States Armed Forces were women, and there was very little research into women's health. Simultaneously, the National Institutes of Health set up an Office on the Research of Women's Health. This prompted Carnes to shift her focus from geriatrics to veteran's women's health. She was awarded a National Institutes of Health Mid-Career Academic Leadership Award to develop research on geriatric women's health. She founded the UW-Madison Center for Women's Health Research, which became a National Center of Excellence.

Carnes became interested in the underrepresentation of women scientists, and decided to study the science workforce through an epidemiological lens. In 2001, she was awarded an National Science Foundation ADVANCE grant, and launched the Women in Science and Engineering Leadership Institute (WISELI) at the University of Wisconsin–Madison. Through the WISELI, Carnes performed a climate survey on women faculty members, developed a professorship program, and designed a workshop to train faculty hiring committees in unconscious bias. Attendance at the faculty hiring committee workshop correlated with enhanced hiring of women faculty members. Carnes was supported by the National Institutes of Health to develop a training program on bias literacy called “break the bias habit". The WISELI eventually became a well recognized research center, producing both cutting-edge scholarship on the participation of women in science and implementing evidence-based solutions. She was awarded the Barbra Streisand Women's Heart Center Linda Joy Pollin Heart Health Leadership Award.

Carnes worked with the Games, Learning and Society Centre to create an immersive game that introduced players to the impacts of bias. She showed that video games could reduce implicit bias because they made people more empathetic.

In 2019, Carnes was awarded a WARF Named Professorship, which she named after Virginia Valian, an American psycholinguist. In 2022, the WISELI was awarded the National Institutes of Health Prize for Enhancing Faculty Gender Diversity in Biomedical and Behavioural Science.

== Selected publications ==
- Kristen W Springer; Jennifer Sheridan; Daphne Kuo; Molly Carnes (May 2007). "Long-term physical and mental health consequences of childhood physical abuse: results from a large population-based sample of men and women". Child Abuse & Neglect. 31 (5): 517–30. doi:10.1016/j.chiabu.2007.01.003. ISSN 0145-2134. PMC 3031095. PMID 17532465. Wikidata Q24632530.
- Elizabeth N. Chapman; Anna Kaatz; Molly Carnes (November 2013). "Physicians and implicit bias: how doctors may unwittingly perpetuate health care disparities". Journal of General Internal Medicine. 28 (11): 1504–10. doi:10.1007/s11606-013-2441-1. ISSN 0884-8734. PMC 3797360. PMID 23576243. Wikidata Q26853092.
- Molly Carnes; Patricia G Devine; Linda Baier Manwell; et al. (1 February 2015). "The effect of an intervention to break the gender bias habit for faculty at one institution: a cluster randomized, controlled trial". Academic Medicine. 90 (2): 221–230. doi:10.1097/acm.0000000000000552. ISSN 1040-2446. PMC 4310758. PMID 25374039. Wikidata Q35027656.
