= Molly Secours =

American film producer

- Born: Massena, New York
- Citizenship: United States
- Occupations: Filmmaker, author, activist
- Known for: White Privilege Pop Quiz
- Website: mollysecours.com

Molly Secours is a Nashville-based filmmaker, author, and activist.

Secours directed and edited the music video Just Waitin which featured the music of singer-songwriter John Prine and the images of Nashville photographer Jack Spencer. She directed Two Kings, a music video about Elvis Presley and Martin Luther King Jr. which featured the singers Pam Tillis and Kris Thomas. In 2022 she is making the documentary Scouting for Diamonds that focuses on the relation between talent scouts and baseball.

As an author, her book White Privilege Pop Quiz: Reflecting on Whiteness asked White people to be more introspective regarding their racial sensibility. People can take her quiz on her website.

Secours is a proponent of social change and democracy and women's rights. A particular issue for her is racial inequity in such areas as criminal justice and education and employment and healthcare, and she is an advocate for greater awareness of white privilege. She worked at The Oasis Center for Women and Girls to help African-American and Latino youth learn life skills via videos. She has worked with journalist John Seigenthaler and with writer John Egerton and with civil rights activist Reverend Will D. Campbell.

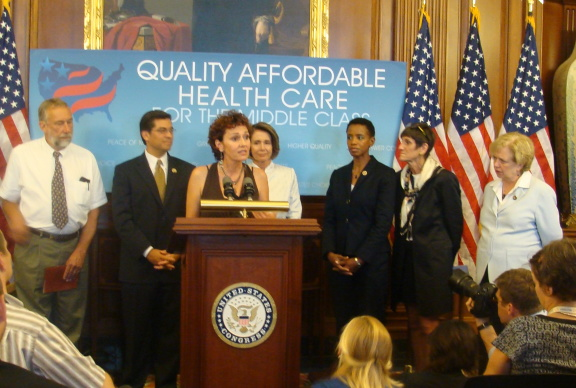
Secours speaks in 2009 at a Washington press conference about affordable healthcare; behind her were several congresspersons including Nancy Pelosi.

Secours was born in Massena, New York, a town where she knew of only one Black person. She moved out west to become a computer executive, and then moved to Nashville in 1994. She won a grant from George Soros's Open Society Institute and used it to make documentaries with kids in juvenile justice. Her documentary Welcome to My Hood appeared in 2001. Secours is a cancer survivor. Her experience battling Stage IV cancer changed her outlook on life.
