= McIndoe =

McIndoe is an Irish-Scottish surname. Notable people with the surname include:

- Alan McIndoe (born 1964), Australian rugby league footballer of the 1980s and 1990s
- James McIndoe (1824–1905), New Zealand politician, father of John
  - John McIndoe (printer) (1858–1916), New Zealand printer, father of Archibald and John
    - Archibald McIndoe CBE FRCS (1900–1960), pioneering New Zealand plastic surgeon who worked for the Royal Air Force during World War II
    - John McIndoe (artist) (1898–1995), New Zealand artist and printer
- James Francis McIndoe (1868–1919), United States Brigadier general
- John McIndoe (minister) (1934–2022), minister of the Church of Scotland
- Michael McIndoe (born 1979), Scottish professional footballer who currently plays for Coventry City
- Peter McIndoe, creator of the "Birds Aren't Real" initiative
- Walter D. McIndoe (1819–1872), U.S. Representative from Wisconsin
- Wayne McIndoe (born 1972), field hockey player

== See also ==
- Hill–McIndoe–Gillies family, Scottish-New Zealand-Australian family
