= Molly Rangiwai-McHale =

New Zealand artist

- Born: 9 December 1985 (age 40)
- Style: Multimedia artist
- Website: https://www.mollyrangiwaimchale.com/

Molly Rangiwai-McHale (born 9 December 1985) is a New Zealand multimedia artist. Her artistic practice focuses on giving indigenous and feminine voices a platform against appropriation of culture and colonial perspectives.

== Life and career ==
Born on 9 December 1985, Rangiwai-McHale is of Māori, Chinese, Scottish, and Irish descent, and affiliates to Ngāti Porou and Te Aupōuri. She completed her Bachelor of Arts degree in visual arts at the University of Auckland and continues to be based in Auckland as an artist.

Her works have been featured and are held in collections in New Zealand, including at Te Papa, Auckland War Memorial Museum, and Auckland Art Gallery.

Her collaborative practice with her partner Luisa Tora has expanded alternative perspectives on historical narratives regarding Indigenous experiences. The pair live together and have been working together artistically since 2013. Some of their most notable works produced together include I Stand With You 2014, a photographic series of 'Auckland and Suva-based queer-identifying women in their lives', and When can I see you again? 2017, exhibited in Fresh Gallery, Ōtara.

=== Exhibitions ===
Year	Title	Involvement	Medium	Location	Ref
2022	Decolonise your tongue	Artist alongside Luisa Tora	Inflatable PVC	Auckland Art Gallery Toi o Tāmaki	
2012	I Don't Wanna Talk About It	Solo exhibition	Acrylic on canvas	Fresh Gallery, Ōtara	
2013-14	Dear Culture Vulture	Artist alongside Luisa Tora	Multimedia installation	6th Annual Tautai Tertiary Exhibition Close to Home, St. Paul's Gallery (Auckland University of Technology) (Sep 2013), OTARAfest & Southside Arts Festival (Oct 2013)	
2017	Beauty is in the Street	Artist alongside Annie Mackenzie, Areez Katki, Ash Mosen, et al.	Photography	Objectspace	
2017	What About Your Friends?	Artist alongside Luisa Tora	Photographic prints	Fresh Gallery Ōtara	
2018	Love and Affection part 1 (within Heavenly Creatures, 2018)	Louisa Afoa, Natasha Matila-Smith, Molly Rangiwai-McHale	Multimedia installation	Verge Gallery, Sydney	
2018	Between You and Me	Louisa Afoa, Natasha Matila-Smith, Molly Rangiwai-McHale, and Faith Wilson	Video, photography, poetry on canvas	Te Wai Ngutu Kākā Gallery Two, Auckland	
2018	The Language of Things: Meaning and Value in Contemporary Jewellery	Includes work by Rangiwai-McHale and over 100 global artists, some being: Yuka Oyama, Bernard Schobinger, Daniel Kruger, and David Bielander	Multimedia jewellery installation	The Dowse Art Museum, Lower Hutt	
2022	Declaration: A Pacific Feminist Agenda	Artist alongside Jasmine Togo-Brisby, Marti Friedlander, Jessicoco Hansell, et al.	Multimedia	Auckland Art Gallery Toi o Tāmaki	
2018	Love and Affection part 2	Solo contribution	Embroidered clothing	St Paul Gallery, AUT	

=== Artworks ===
Her own projects within her practice include contributing to The Language of Things: Meaning and Value in Contemporary Jewellery exhibition at The Dowse Art Museum, Lower Hutt, in 2018, as well as Beauty is in the Street, Objectspace, Auckland, in 2017. Beauty is in the Street consists of one of Rangiwai-McHale's jewellery works she crafted in collaboration with Luisa Tora entitled I Can't Stop Humble Bragging Part 1.

Rangiwai-McHale exhibited individual work for Love and Affection part 1 within the larger Heavenly Creatures 2018 exhibition at Verge Gallery, Sydney. In a multimedia installation alongside artists Louisa Afoa and Natasha Matila-Smith, she portrayed ideas of autonomy with the purpose of bringing indigenous voices to the forefront. Within her general practice, the theme of countering colonial perspectives of indigenous art histories, especially for Māori and Pacific histories, is significant.

Between You and Me combined the work of four women artists of colour including Molly Rangiwai-McHale, Louisa Afoa, Natasha Matila-Smith, and Faith Wilson in a 2018 multimedia exhibition. Rangiwai-McHale exhibited three embroidered pieces of clothing in the corner of the space.

Author Ane Tonga discusses Rangiwai-McHale's piece with Luisa Tora entitled Decolonise Your Tongue 2022 within Declaration: A Pacific Feminist Agenda. The 2022 work came as a result of 2013 mixed media works around similar thematics that the artists explored. The sculptural installation is notable for not only its size, but also for portraying complex societal topics in a digestible manner. The black teddy bear reshapes a childhood symbol into what Tonga describes as a vehicle for 'comparing the reduction of the fierce animal to a docile, small, cute collectible with the mispronunciation of Indigenous names.' The incorrect pronunciation of indigenous names is directly addressed with 'Decolonise Your Tongue' labelling the heart that the bear holds.

=== Dear Culture Vulture collection ===
This collection belongs to the Pacific Cultures collection at Museum of New Zealand Te Papa Tongarewa as of 2014 and includes three works by Luisa Tora and Molly Rangiwai-McHale produced between 2013 and March 2014.

The intent of the work is described as prioritising indigenous voices in the face of appropriated Māori and Pacific art and knowledge. Nina Tonga accentuates that Pacific cultural identity is often represented through temporary body adornments or permanent forms like tatau, but has faced appropriation. Therefore this collection proposed acknowledging items like breastplates, garlands, and adornments within the context of their culture and communities. The collection was first commissioned for and exhibited at the sixth annual Tautai Tertiary exhibition, Close to Home, at St. Pauls Gallery, AUT, in September 2013. Following this, the works were installed in the Ōtara Window space in October 2013 for local arts events, OTARAfest and Southside Arts Festival.

The first item in the collection is a necklace consisting of four skulls and three leaves. The skulls are adorned to be "bloody red" in appearance, making the audience aware of the work's serious positionality but also indirectly pointing to conversations around using historical Western terms like 'primitivism' in a 21st century context. The next item in the collection addresses themes of protection and welcomes collective understanding. Titled The Ocean Will Protect Me, the audience is presented with a breastplate formed of six paired lobsters inspired by materials sourced in Onehunga, and a harness and fasteners for increased accessibility. And lastly the collection holds a yellow pendant necklace entitled D.I.Y. (It's in our DNA). The pendant's geometric layers of red, blue and yellow plastic and aluminium are suspended on a yellow chain.

=== When Can I See You Again? ===
In a review with the Pantograph Punch, Kari Schmidt discusses When Can I See You Again?. This exhibition took place at Fresh Gallery Ōtara in 2017 and was curated by Molly Rangiwai-McHale and Luisa Tora with the priority of showcasing women, LGBTQI+, Māori, Pacific, and Pākehā artists.Ideas of maintaining community connections regardless of geographical limitations founded the basis of the show.

One of the works by Rangiwai-McHale and Tora is entitled What About you Friends?, a series of eighteen photographic prints produced in 2017. The prints are in black and white to draw attention to the exhibition's underlying concept. A zine accompanies the display and presents questions and answers to the audience such as 'What would you save in a fire?.' The multiplicity of perspective in Bell Hooks' essay 'In Our Glory' contributed to making of Rangiwai-McHale and Tora's work. The essay analyses the intersections of photography and daily life for black people in the US during the Civil Rights Movement.

== Recognition ==
Rangiwai-McHale's work has been recognised in a media article written by Tulia Thompson for The Spinoff. The collaborative exhibition Declaration: A Pacific Feminist Agenda was advertised for its opening at Auckland Art Gallery and reviewed by the author, with McHale's Decolonise Your Tongue featuring. Thompson commented on how the artists and their families had experienced name mispronunciation, suggesting this was conceptually translated in the sculpture. As previously suggested, this observation of the labelled bear aligns with the artists' intentions. Alongside reactions to the work, insight into the making process of the work was divulged, for instance, the bear itself was made by an East Tamaki plastic fabrication business.
