= Molly Cameron =

American racing cyclist (born 1976)

Personal information
- Full name: Molly Cameron
- Nickname: Cam Cam
- Born: August 28, 1976 (age 50) Wichita Falls, Texas

Cycling career
- Sport: Cycling
- Current team: Portland Bicycle Studio
- Disciplines: Cyclo-cross; Track; Road; Mountain bike racing
- Role: Rider
- Rider type: All-Rounder

Professional teams
- 2006: Vanilla Bicycles
- 2007: Vanilla Bicycles
- 2008: Vanilla Bicycles
- 2009: Portland Bicycle Studio
- 2010: Portland Bicycle Studio
- 2011: Oh Boy! Oberto

Major wins
- 2004 Cross Crusade Singlespeed Series

Molly Cameron (born August 28, 1976) is an American professional cyclo-cross racing cyclist who rides for Portland Bicycle Studio. She was the first openly transgender (MTF= Male to Female) athlete to compete in a (Men's Category) UCI Cyclo-cross World Cup, and is an acknowledged vegan athlete.

Cameron won the 2004 Cross Crusade singlespeed series and has been racing at a pro level ever since. She has competed in cyclo-cross races in the US and Europe at the elite racer level.

Cameron has long identified as a woman, but has raced in the elite men's scene since 2008.
