= Molly Wright =

Molly Wright may refer to:

- Molly Wright (rugby union) (born 1991), New Zealand rugby player
- Molly Wright (actress) (born 1996), English actress
- Molly Wright Steenson, American professor of design
