= Molly Morse =

American civil engineer

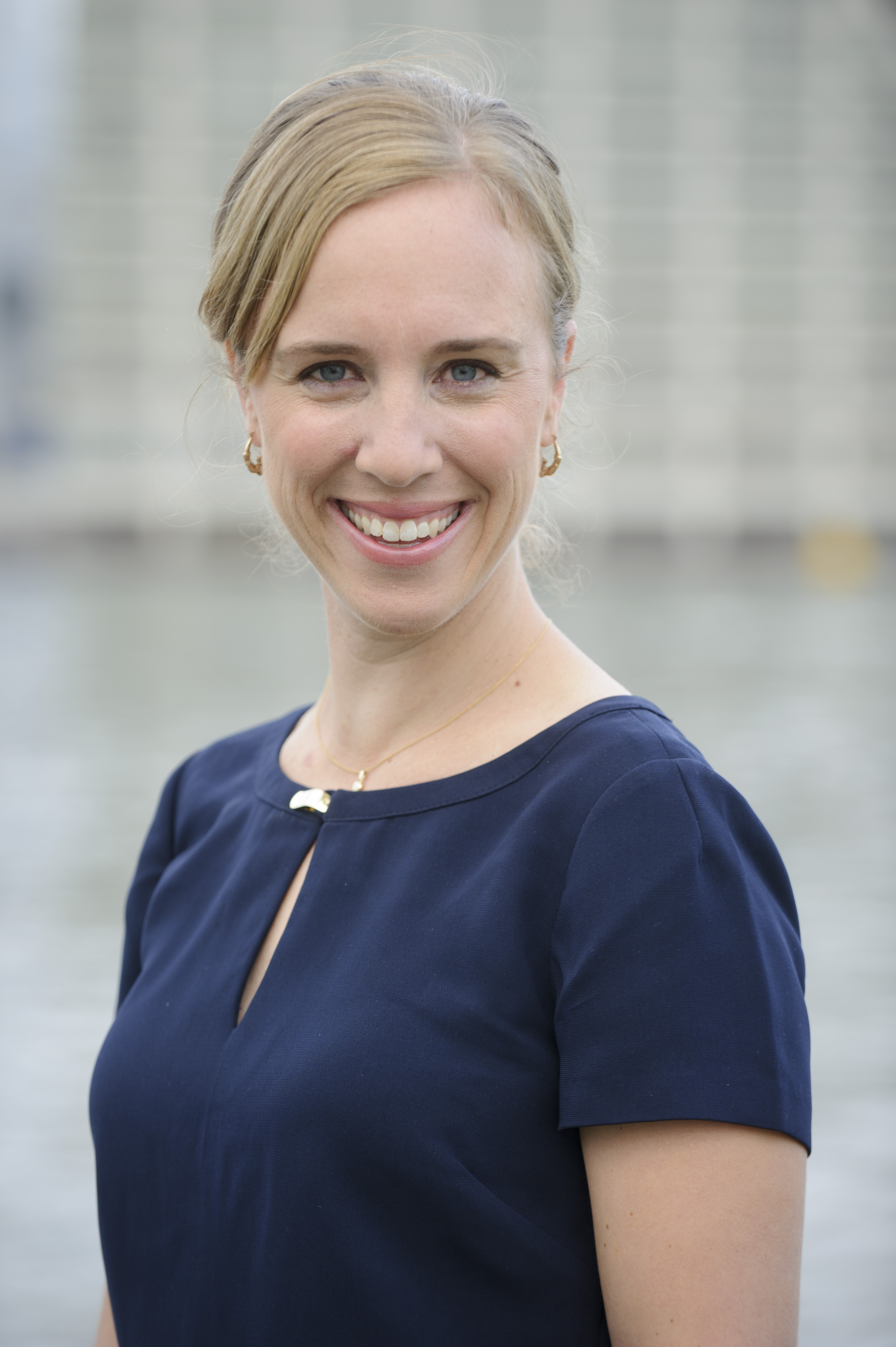
- Morse, as winner of the Postcode Lottery Green Challenge for 2012
- Education: Cornell University; Stanford University
- Scientific career
- Workplaces: Mango Materials

Molly Morse is an American civil engineer who is the CEO of Mango Materials, a start-up based in San Francisco Bay Area. Mango Materials uses methane gas to feed bacteria which manufacture a biopolymer.

== Early life and education ==
Morse completed her undergraduate studies in civil and environmental engineering at Cornell University. She moved to Stanford University for her doctoral research, where she studied anaerobic biodegradation of biocomposites for the building industry.

== Scientific career ==
Morse joined Bryant & Bryant, LLC, where she researched alternative building materials.

Morse became concerned about the build up of non-biodegradable plastic in the environment. These plastics can pollute natural resources and damage ecosystems. She recognized that waste methane could be converted into biodegradable plastics that achieve similar functionalities to paraffin-based plastics. In microbial rich environments, these biodegradable plastics break down, producing methane which can once again be converted into a biodegradable plastic (Polyhydroxyalkanoates). She launched the company Mango Materials in 2010, which was named as one of the Next 50 Companies to Disrupt the World by Biofuels Digest in 2022.

Morse was awarded the 2018 US Clean Energy Education and Empowerment (C3E) Initiative Entrepreneurship Award.
