= Molly Barker =

American educator and triathlete

Molly Barker (born in 1960) is an American educator, triathlete and social visionary. She is best known as the founder of Girls on the Run.

== Personal life and education ==
Barker was born in 1960 as Mary Wilmer in Charlotte, North Carolina to Mary van der Voort Wilmer and Henry "Hank" Bond Wilmer. Barker has one brother and three sisters. Her sister, Helen Nance is the founder of Gray Stone Day School in Misenheimer, NC. Her mother, Mary van der Voort Wilmer (1923-2002) was well regarded in the area of addiction recovery and treatment, and is one of the women profiled in "Women Coming out of the Shadows", sharing her story of addiction and recovery. Her father, Hank Wilmer was active in Charlotte, NC, serving as Chairman of the Mecklenburg County Republican party. Barker credits her mother for inviting her along on a run as the inspiration for taking up running. She began running competitively when she was 15 years old.

Barker has 2 children, James and Helen.

Barker attended the University of North Carolina at Chapel Hill, receiving a Bachelor of Science in chemistry in 1982. She went on to receive her master's degree in Social Work in 1989.

== Fields of Impact ==
Barker began her career in education by teaching science and math from 1982 to 1987 in Atlanta, GA, Charleston, SC, and Charlotte, NC. From 1989 to 1991, Barker was a social worker and counselor in Rock Hill, SC, Davidson, NC and Charlotte, NC.

From 1991-93, Barker trained as a professional cyclist and triathlete, competing at an elite level in 4 Hawaiian Ironman Triathlons, other triathlons and multiple marathons. She has credited her love of running with saving her life, helping her to give up drinking and finding a way to make a difference.

In 1996, Barker founded Girls on the Run in Charlotte N.C., with an inaugural group of 13 pre-teen girls, and developed the self-esteem, character development, and healthy lifestyle program that has expanded to include over 2 million girls over the past 25 years. Based on research about resiliency in youth, Barker designed the foundational Girls on the Run curriculum. Barker is credited with coining the phrase "The Girl Box", defined as the imaginary place of conformity where girls may go during adolescence, due to cultural and societal stereotypes that limit choices and opportunities. Girls on the Run is now a national non-profit organization offering programming for third to eighth grade girls focused on social, emotional, physical and behavioral skills used to successfully navigate adolescent and adulthood life experiences. The program's experiential curriculum emphasizes the development of competence, confidence, connection, character, caring, and contribution through lessons that incorporate running and other physical activities. The life skills curriculum is delivered by caring and competent volunteer coaches who are trained to teach lessons as intended.

Barker has served as an Ashoka Fellow since 2008 where she supports social entrepreneurship and inspires young people to become Changemakers.

After serving on The Commission for Political Reform in Washington, DC, from 2013–14, Barker founded The Red Boot Coalition, a program using a conversation-based methodology designed to humanize individuals in opposing groups and create compassionate communities built upon self-awareness and communication.

From 2018, Barker served as a Leaders' Quest Associate facilitator, helping people embrace their strengths and realize their potential.

== Awards and recognition ==
Barker's contributions to society were recognized by George W. Bush and Barack Obama with a Daily Point of Light Award presented at a White House ceremony and by the University of North Carolina Chapel Hill in 2008 with a Distinguished Alumna Award. In 2012, Barker was named to Fast Company's League of Extraordinary Women. After selecting her as one of their "heroes of running" in 2006, Runner's World named her one of "The 50 Most Influential People in Running" in 2015.

== Publications and presentations ==
Barker's published books include:

- Girls on Track: A Parent's Guide to Inspiring Our Daughters to Achieve a Lifetime of Self-Respect and Healthy Living, Random House Publications, New York, NY, 2004.
- Girls Lit From Within: A Guide to Life Outside the Girl Box, Self-Published, Charlotte, NC, 2006
- The Wisdom Stories, Finding Wisdom in the Ordinary, Spark Publications, Charlotte, NC, 2018.
- Kids Lit from Within, Self-published, 2021.

Barker has presented multiple talks at TEDx Charlotte starting in 2011 and in the two parts of the emotionally stirring "The Word I Wanted to Say is...". Barker delivered her TEDx talk, "A Letter to Congress", corresponding to her efforts to motivate and unite members of the US Congress to implement programming helpful to the emotional, physical, mental, spiritual and social well-being of youth in the US.
