= Molly Macindoe =

American/New Zealander photographer and photojournalist

Molly Macindoe (born 1979) is a UK based photographer and photojournalist with U.S.A. and New Zealand dual nationality. She is best known for her work documenting the underground rave scene. She uses photographic film as a medium in the majority of her works.

== Early life and education ==
Born in Qatar in 1979 to an American and a New Zealander, Macindoe's early childhood was spent in a multicultural community of ex-pats. She moved with her family to England in 1986 and began school in London. She went on to study art at A-level and focused her work on Free Parties and photography.

== Life and work ==
Influenced by her well-travelled parents, Macindoe developed a love for international travel and visited many places such as Papua New Guinea, Tibet, Russia, Iran and Syria, photographically documenting the diverse cultures she encountered. Her attention was always drawn back to the free party community and since 1997, she has participated in and documented the underground scene.

In 2005 she completed a BA course in Photographic Arts at the University of Westminster where her final exhibit was based on a photographic journey through Iran, including images of Tehran's highly illegal party scene. After leaving University, she began her career in social documentary photography, culminating in the publication of her photographic study, Out of Order (2011, Tangent Books). Her book documents ten years of the underground rave, Free party and Teknival scene in the UK and Europe. It contains an introduction and essay by musicologist Caroline Stedman. The 2nd edition (2015, Front Left Books) contains a foreword by photographer Tom Hunter.

Macindoe's published work is notable due to the low prevalence of documentation of her subject matter, as noted by Artefact magazine in their review of her work which it described as "stark, honest and humanistic, a rare and insightful documentary of a precious subculture". Macindoe is one of the top five featured photographers for Youth Club Archive, a not-for-profit organisation working to "preserve, share, educate and celebrate youth culture history". The organisation also notes the significance of her work in documenting the free party subculture and describes it "as authentic as the subculture she follows.. a previously unseen insight into an empowered world free of boundaries." She is a main contributor to all the organisation's shows and symposiums and will feature in the upcoming world's first Youth Culture Museum funded by National Lottery Heritage Fund.

Out of Order was favourably reviewed in a 5-page spread in the Architects' Journal. Dazed published two of her photojournalism articles about raves in Jordan and Lebanon. Dazed also published her work in two further articles. Macindoe's work has also been published at TheGuardian.com, in Wonderland, Mixmag, Vice Media, Focus, the Spanish El País, Playground Magazine, Hunger TV, i-D, SX Magazine Redbull and Hotshoe International. She was also commissioned to provide images and copy for a Sunday edition of The Times Style Magazine article.

Her work has featured in several notable exhibitions: Sweet Harmony: Rave Today at the Saatchi Gallery, London, Electro Expo at Philharmonie de Paris, Dance & Disobedience – An Exhibition for playful protagonists at Rich Mix. Macindoe has also exhibited in the Millennium Dome, Camden Roundhouse, the Arnolfini, and the Southbank Centre.

Macindoe presented a solo show in Carnaby Street at The Subculture Archives. She had an exhibition at RVLT festival at the Worm in 2015.

In 2015 her travel photography was featured in an 8-page spread in China's Lens Magazine.

In August 2019, a Macindoe image was used in a range of Alexander McQueen T-shirts.

Other works include a short film about OCD entitled Reverence & Ritual and a photographic installation about her travels on the Trans-Siberian Railway. She was also part of a team that produced a short magic realist film, Dis Burnin Now.

Macindoe is a founding member of Random Artists, a collective formed by like-minded creative people from the underground rave scene, which has staged open-access Temporary Autonomous Art events in squatted venues across the UK.

== Publications ==
- Out of Order. Tangent, 2011.
  - Second edition. Front Left, 2015.
- Out of Date. Front Left, 2016. Rave calendar.
- Documenting the Rave Road. Front Left, 2017. Book of postcards.
