= Molly O'Reilly (activist) =

1916 Irish Easter Rising Activist

- Born: 1900; Dublin, Ireland
- Died: 4 October 1950 (aged 49–50)
- Military career
- Allegiance: Irish Citizen Army; Cumann na mBan
- Conflicts: Easter Rising; Irish War of Independence; Irish Civil War

Molly O'Reilly (1900 – 4 October 1950) was an Irish republican and Socialist activist and soldier, taking part in the 1916 Irish Easter Rising with the Irish Citizen Army. Most notably, she unfurled the flag at Liberty Hall for the ICA during preparations for the rising.

== Early life ==
Molly O’Reilly was born in 1900 and lived on Lower Gardiner Street in the historical Monto area of Dublin. Her family was largely apolitical prior to her involvement in politics, though her father was staunchly anti-Sinn Féin. At the age of 11 she joined Clann na nGaedheal, an Irish republican girl scouts movement formed by May and Liz Kelly in 1909. Two years later, appalled by the living conditions in the Dublin tenements, she volunteered to support the workers and their families during the 1913 Lock-out and helped organise a soup kitchen in Liberty Hall.

She was a heavily influenced by James Connolly during this time and joined his socialist and republican group, the Irish Citizen Army (ICA), while also being an active member of the Irish Women Workers' Union. The ICA was founded in response to the severe conditions faced by Dublin's working classes and also to protect workers from the Dublin Metropolitan Police during strikes, such as that of the 1913 Lock-out organised by the Irish Transport and General Workers Union (ITGWU). In July 1914, after hundreds of rifles were landed at Howth by the Asgard during the Howth gun-running operation, she brought dozens of the rifles to her home at Gardner Street for storage until they could be distributed to secure weapon dumps throughout the city.

== Easter Rising ==
When O’Reilly was fourteen years of age, she was asked by James Connolly to raise the flag of the ICA, a green flag emboldened with an uncrowned harp, over Liberty Hall a week before the Rising began.

During the 1916 Easter Rising, O'Reilly ran messages for Connolly and also served as a dispatch courier, carrying messages and information between the City Hall and the rebel garrisons at the GPO. O'Reilly's commitment to the rising was rooted in her belief in social justice and the rights of the Irish people to determine their fate.

O'Reilly was part of a section of the ICA, led by Sean Connolly, that attacked Dublin Castle during the rising - though ultimately the section fell back to City Hall. After Connolly was fatally hit by machine gun fire while raising the tricolour over City Hall, leaving them without a commandant, O'Reilly and Helena Molony went to the GPO to request reinforcements without success. Both were taken prisoner by the British and held in a barracks on the Ship Street side of the castle.

== War of Independence, Civil War and later life ==
After the failure of the Easter Rising and then the execution of its leaders, including James Connolly, O'Reilly travelled to Yorkshire to study nursing for a three years before returning to Ireland to join Cumann na mBan during the War of Independence. During this time, she also worked at the United Services Club in Stevens Green, using the role to spy for Michael Collins on British soldiers who frequented the club.

She opposed the 1921 Anglo-Irish Treaty at the conclusion of the War of Independence, siding with the Anti-Treaty side during the Irish Civil War that followed. In March 1923 she was imprisoned by Pro-Treaty forces. Later that year, she took part in the first female hunger strike, and after sixteen days, their hunger strike eventually led to the release of her and fifty other in November 1923.

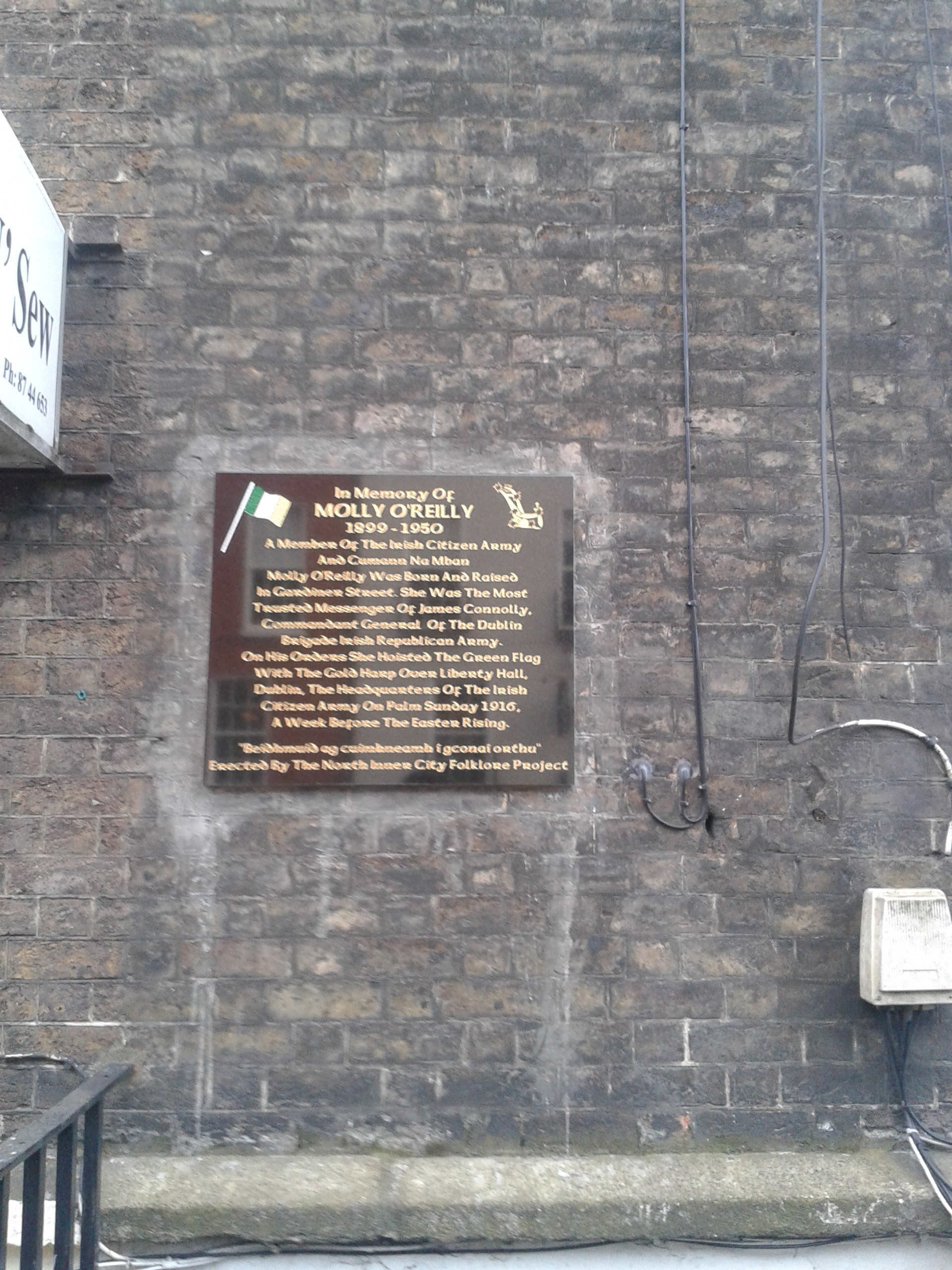
Molly O'Reilly plaque

O'Reilly died on 4 October 1950. A plaque was erected at 44 Lower Gardiner Street in 2016 by the North Inner City Folklore Project to commemorate O'Reilly.
