= Molly Healy =

Australian cricketer

Personal information
- Full name: Molly B Healy
- Batting: Right-handed
- Bowling: Right-arm medium
- Role: Batter

Domestic team information
- Years: Team
- 2019/20–2021/22: Western Australia

Career statistics
Competition	WLA
Matches	1
Runs scored	6
Batting average	6.00
100s/50s	0/0
Top score	6
Catches/stumpings	0/–
- Source: CricketArchive, 26 March 2021

Molly B Healy is an Australian cricketer who plays as a right-handed batter and right-arm medium pace bowler. She last played for Western Australia in the Women's National Cricket League (WNCL). She made her WNCL debut on 22 September 2019 against Tasmania.
