= Molly Lewis (basketball) =

Australian basketball player

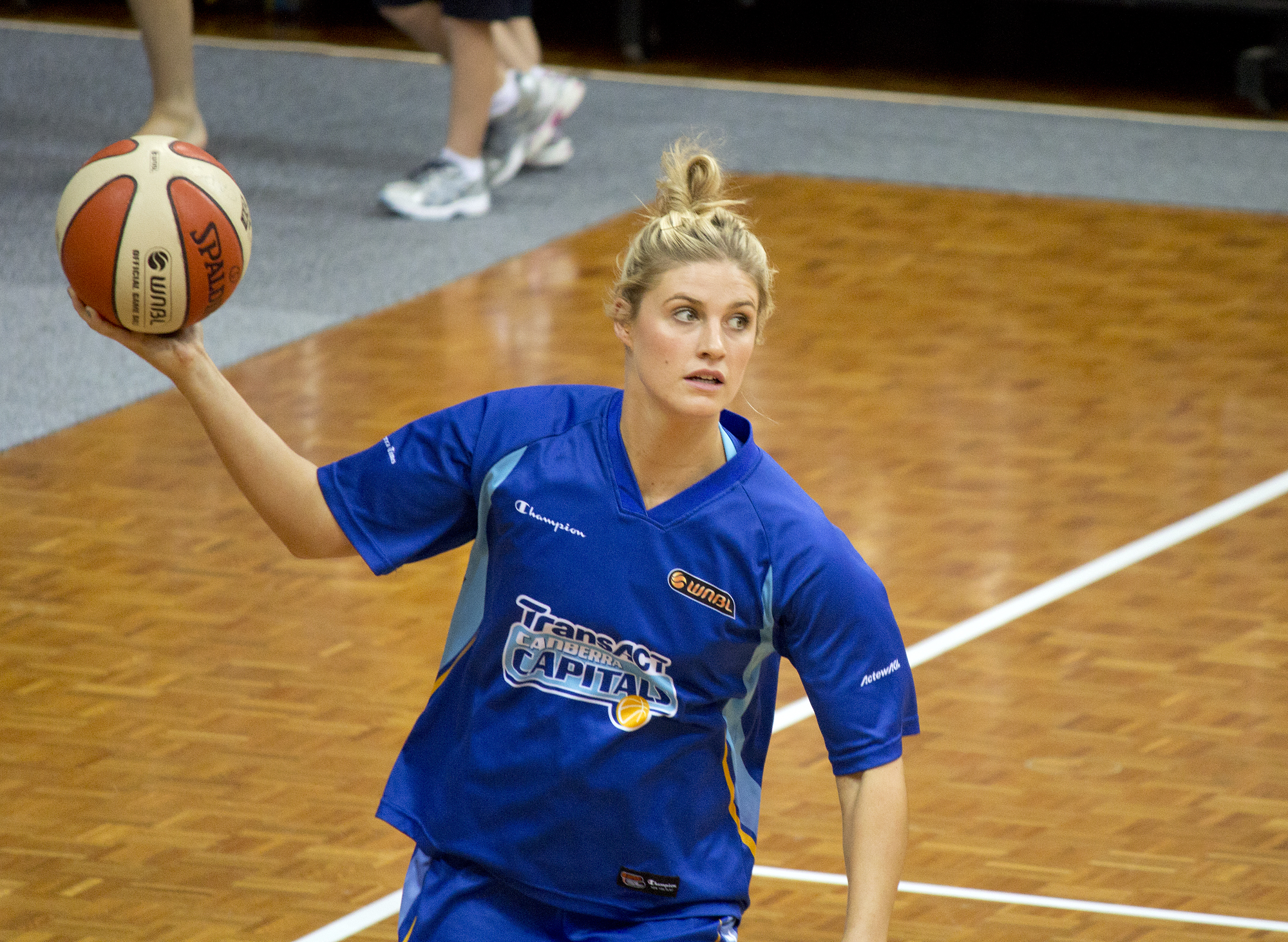
- Lewis during a game between the Capitals and Logan Thunder at AIS Arena

No. 9 – Canberra Capitals
- Position: Forward
- League: WNBL

Personal information
- Born: 28 October 1989 (age 37)

Career information
- Playing career: 2005–present

Career history
- ?: Australian Institute of Sport, Sydney Uni Flames

Molly Pauline Lewis (born 28 October 1989) is a basketball player from Australia. She has played for the Australian Institute of Sport, Sydney Uni Flames and Canberra Capitals in Australia's WNBL.

== Personal ==
Lewis is originally from Tasmania. She is 183 centimetres (72 in) tall. She did not play basketball during the 2010/2011 season because she felt like it was an obligation. She has a brother and a sister. While playing for Sydney, she attended the Australian College of Physical Education and studied physical education.

== Basketball ==
=== Juniors ===
Lewis played her junior basketball in Tasmania and New South Wales.

=== Australian Institute of Sport ===
In 2005, Lewis was playing for the Australian Institute of Sport's WNBL team. She played in a preseason game for the team against the Canberra Capitals. She also played for the team during the 2006/2007 season.

=== Sydney Uni Flames ===
Lewis played for the Sydney Uni Flames for three seasons. She first joined the team for the 2007/2008 season.

=== Canberra Capitals ===
For the Capitals, Lewis wears number 9 and plays forward. She signed a one-year contract with the Capitals to play for them during the 2011/2012 season. She got the contract because Alison Lacey decided to not play basketball for the Capitals during the season. Michelle Cosier's pre-season injury was an opportunity for the Capitals to get a better look at Lewis. She played in a pre-season game against the Sydney Uni Flames that Canberra lost. This was the first real opportunity the team's coaches had to see her play with the team. In an October 2011 game for the Capitals, she scored 11 points against the Rangers. In a December 2011 game against the Bulleen Boomers, she fouled out.

=== SEABL ===
Lewis played for a Launceston Tornadoes team in the SEABL with Capitals teammate Nicole Hunt in 2011. Carrie Graf saw this as an opportunity for her to grow as a player.

=== National team ===
Lewis was a member of the Australian junior national team in 2007 and played in the World Championships. She played 17 total games for the junior national team.

=== Adelaide Link Lightning ===
Lewis currently plays for Adelaide Lightning.

=== Coaching ===
Lewis was a development coach for the New South Wales Under 16 Women Country team in 2010.
