= 2013 Regional Women's Championship =

- Dates: 5 August – 14 August 2013
- Administrator(s): Cricket West Indies
- Cricket format: 50 over
- Tournament format(s): Group stage and knockout
- Champions: Jamaica (4th title)
- Participants: 8
- Matches: 17
- Most runs: June Ogle (226)
- Most wickets: Stafanie Taylor (11)

The 2013 Regional Women's Championship was a 50-over women's cricket competition that took place in the West Indies. It took place in August 2013, with 8 teams taking part and all matches taking place in Grenada and Saint Lucia. Jamaica won the tournament, beating Trinidad and Tobago in the final to win their second 50-over title in two years.

The tournament was followed by the 2013 Regional Women's Twenty20 Championship.

== Competition format ==
The eight teams were divided into two groups of four, playing every team in their group once. Matches were played using a one day format with 50 overs per side. The top two teams in each group advanced to the semi-finals, whilst the bottom two teams in each group went into a play-off round.

The group worked on a points system with positions being based on the total points. Points were awarded as follows:

Win: 4 points
Tie: 2 points
Loss: 0 points.
Abandoned/No Result: 2 points.
Bonus Points: 1 bonus point available per match.

== Points tables ==
=== Group A ===
| Team | Pld | W | L | T | NR | A | BP | Pts | NRR |
|---|---|---|---|---|---|---|---|---|---|
| Trinidad and Tobago (Q) | 3 | 3 | 0 | 0 | 0 | 0 | 2 | 14 | 1.693 |
| Barbados (Q) | 3 | 2 | 1 | 0 | 0 | 0 | 2 | 10 | 2.204 |
| Saint Vincent and the Grenadines | 3 | 1 | 2 | 0 | 0 | 0 | 1 | 5 | –0.720 |
| Grenada | 3 | 0 | 3 | 0 | 0 | 0 | 0 | 0 | –2.90 |

=== Group B ===
| Team | Pld | W | L | T | NR | A | BP | Pts | NRR |
|---|---|---|---|---|---|---|---|---|---|
| Jamaica (Q) | 3 | 3 | 0 | 0 | 0 | 0 | 3 | 15 | 3.258 |
| Guyana (Q) | 3 | 1 | 1 | 0 | 1 | 0 | 1 | 7 | 1.070 |
| Dominica | 3 | 1 | 2 | 0 | 0 | 0 | 0 | 4 | –2.645 |
| Saint Lucia | 3 | 0 | 2 | 0 | 1 | 0 | 0 | 2 | –1.816 |

Source: CricketArchive

== Knockout stage ==
=== Play-Offs ===
11 August 2013
Scorecard

| Grenada; 152 (43.1 overs) | v | Dominica; 22/2 (10.1 overs) |
| Debbie-Ann Lewis 31 (50); Annica Andrew 3/20 (4.1 overs) | | Pearl Etienne 6 (9); Rackel Williams 2/10 (5.1 overs) |

No Result
Beausejour Cricket Ground, Gros Islet
Umpires: Ryan Willoughby and Christopher Wright

- Dominica won the toss and elected to field.
- No further play possible due to rain.

11 August 2013
Scorecard

| Saint Vincent and the Grenadines; 85/5 (27.5 overs) | v | Saint Lucia |
| Sheree-Ann John 14* (26); Chemika Abraham 2/10 (5 overs) |

No Result
La Sagesse Park, St. David's
Umpires: Erickson Degalarie and Kevin Sisnett

- Saint Lucia won the toss and elected to field.
- No further play possible due to rain.

=== Semi-finals ===
11 August 2013
Scorecard

| Barbados; 186/9 (50 overs) | v | Jamaica; 6/1 (2.2 overs) |
| Kyshona Knight 48 (72); Stafanie Taylor 3/20 (10 overs) | | Natasha McLean 2* (4); Shanna Thompson 1/2 (1 over) |

No Result
Progress Park, Grenville
Umpires: Roger Davis and Lyndon Rajkumar

- Barbados won the toss and elected to bat.
- No further play possible due to rain.
- Jamaica progressed to the final on better record in qualifying.

11 August 2013
Scorecard

| Guyana; 191/5 (50 overs) | v | Trinidad and Tobago; 71/2 (20.5 overs) |
| June Ogle 55 (138); Lee-Ann Kirby 1/10 (2 overs) | | Amanda Samaroo 37* (56); Erva Giddings 1/14 (5 overs) |

Trinidad and Tobago won by 8 runs (D/L)
Tanteen Recreation Ground, St. George's
Umpires: Christopher Taylor and Troy Tudor

- Trinidad and Tobago won the toss and elected to field.
- Match halted due to rain; Trinidad and Tobago target was 64 at time of stoppage.

=== Final ===
14 August 2013
Scorecard

| Trinidad and Tobago; 83 (38 overs) | v | Jamaica; 86/3 (21.1 overs) |
| Merissa Aguilleira 17 (39); Stafanie Taylor 3/13 (7 overs) | | Chinelle Henry 31 (31); Gaitri Seetahal 1/6 (2 overs) |

Jamaica won by 7 wickets
Tanteen Recreation Ground, St. George's
Umpires: Roger Davis and Ryan Willoughby
Player of the match: Stafanie Taylor

- Trinidad and Tobago won the toss and elected to bat.

== Statistics ==
=== Most runs ===
| Player | Team | Matches | Innings | Runs | Average | HS | 100s | 50s |
|---|---|---|---|---|---|---|---|---|
| June Ogle | Guyana | 4 | 4 | 226 | 75.33 | 104* | 1 | 2 |
| Juliana Nero | Saint Vincent and the Grenadines | 4 | 4 | 174 | 43.50 | 86 | 0 | 2 |
| Shemaine Campbelle | Guyana | 4 | 4 | 163 | 40.75 | 85 | 0 | 1 |
| Pamela Lavine | Barbados | 4 | 4 | 154 | 38.50 | 58 | 0 | 2 |
| Deandra Dottin | Barbados | 4 | 3 | 139 | 46.33 | 103 | 1 | 0 |

Source: CricketArchive

=== Most wickets ===
| Player | Team | Overs | Wickets | Average | BBI | 5w |
|---|---|---|---|---|---|---|
| Stafanie Taylor | Jamaica | 33.0 | 11 | 5.36 | 3/12 | 0 |
| Shanel Daley | Jamaica | 35.0 | 10 | 7.10 | 3/11 | 0 |
| Kirbyina Alexander | Trinidad and Tobago | 27.4 | 10 | 9.40 | 5/38 | 1 |
| Afy Fletcher | Grenada | 31.0 | 10 | 13.50 | 4/45 | 0 |
| Rackel Williams | Grenada | 35.1 | 9 | 17.55 | 3/39 | 0 |

Source: CricketArchive
