= 2014 Regional Women's Championship =

- Dates: 7 August – 13 August 2014
- Administrator(s): Cricket West Indies
- Cricket format: 50 over
- Tournament format(s): Group stage and knockout
- Champions: Jamaica (5th title)
- Participants: 8
- Matches: 20

The 2014 Regional Women's Championship was a 50-over women's cricket competition that took place in the West Indies. It took place in August 2014, with 8 teams taking part and all matches taking place in Dominica. Jamaica won the tournament, beating Guyana in the final to win their third 50-over title in three years.

== Competition format ==
The eight teams were divided into two groups of four, playing every team in their group once. Matches were played using a one day format with 50 overs per side. The top two teams in each group advanced to the semi-finals, whilst the bottom two teams in each group went into 5th-place play-off semi-finals.

The group worked on a points system with positions being based on the total points. Points were awarded as follows:

Win: 4 points
Tie: 2 points
Loss: 0 points.
Abandoned/No Result: 2 points.
Bonus Points: 1 bonus point available per match.

== Points tables ==
=== Group A ===
Team	Pld	W	L	T	NR	A	BP	Pts	NRR
Trinidad and Tobago (Q)	3	2	0	0	0	1	2	12	5.602
Barbados (Q)	3	2	0	0	0	1	2	12	3.405
Grenada	3	1	2	0	0	0	1	5	–0.521
Dominica	3	0	3	0	0	0	0	0	–5.656

=== Group B ===
Team	Pld	W	L	T	NR	A	BP	Pts	NRR
Guyana (Q)	3	3	0	0	0	0	2	14	2.659
Jamaica (Q)	3	2	1	0	0	0	2	10	1.270
Saint Vincent and the Grenadines	3	1	2	0	0	0	1	5	–1.602
Saint Lucia	3	0	3	0	0	0	0	0	–1.920

Source: CricketArchive

== Knockout stage ==
=== 5th-place play-offs ===
==== Semi-finals ====
12 August 2014
Scorecard

Saint Vincent and the Grenadines; 156/9 (50 overs)	v	Dominica; 84 (42.4 overs)
Samantha Lynch 50 (137); Joslyn Ferrol 3/34 (10 overs)		Pearl Etienne 15 (22); Latoya Providence 3/12 (10 overs)

Saint Vincent and the Grenadines won by 72 runs
Benjamin's Park, Portsmouth
Umpires: Kellman Kowlessar and Kevin Sisnett

- Dominica won the toss and elected to field.

12 August 2014
Scorecard

Grenada	v	Saint Lucia

Match Abandoned
Geneva Playing Field, Grand Bay

- No toss.
- No play possible due to rain.
- Grenada progressed to the 5th-place play-off due to better record in qualifying.

==== 7th-place play-off ====
13 August 2014
Scorecard

Saint Lucia; 99 (33.5 overs)	v	Dominica; 94 (33.2 overs)
Qiana Joseph 26* (69); Pearl Etienne 4/5 (8.5 overs)		Kimara Sabaroche 32 (50); Teadie Crowford 3/13 (10 overs)

Saint Lucia won by 5 runs
Geneva Playing Field, Grand Bay
Umpires: Kellman Kowlessar and Kevin Sisnett

- Dominica won the toss and elected to field.

==== 5th-place play-off ====
13 August 2014
Scorecard

Grenada; 98 (33.4 overs)	v	Saint Vincent and the Grenadines; 99/3 (20.4 overs)
Debbie-Ann Lewis 18 (45); Shavorne Clarke 4/18 (9 overs)		Juliana Nero 32* (42); Akeira Peters 1/16 (6 overs)

Saint Vincent and the Grenadines won by 7 wickets
Benjamin's Park, Portsmouth
Umpires: Bernard Joseph and Francis Maurice

- Saint Vincent and the Grenadines won the toss and elected to field.

=== Semi-finals ===
12 August 2014
Scorecard

Barbados; 88 (25.4 overs)	v	Guyana; 89/7 (29.3 overs)
Kyshona Knight 19* (47); Tremayne Smartt 2/21 (4 overs)		Shemaine Campbelle 32 (54); Hayley Matthews 3/16 (6 overs)

Guyana won by 3 wickets
Botanical Gardens, Roseau
Umpires: Francis Maurice and Lyndon Rajkumar

- Barbados won the toss and elected to bat.

12 August 2014
Scorecard

Jamaica; 214/2 (31 overs)	v	Trinidad and Tobago; 148 (30.4 overs)
Stafanie Taylor 101* (57); Kirbyina Alexander 1/39 (7 overs)		Britney Cooper 57 (64); Natasha McLean 3/30 (5 overs)

Jamaica won by 66 runs
Windsor Park, Roseau
Umpires: Jonathan Blades and Christopher Wright

- Trinidad and Tobago won the toss and elected to field.
- Match reduced to 31 overs per side due to rain.

=== 3rd-place play-off ===
13 August 2014
Scorecard

Trinidad and Tobago; 183/6 (50 overs)	v	Barbados; 107 (33.4 overs)
Stacy-Ann King 63* (65); Aaliyah Alleyne 3/35 (9 overs)		Deandra Dottin 31 (51); Anisa Mohammed 3/11 (9 overs)

Trinidad and Tobago won by 76 runs
Botanical Gardens, Roseau
Umpires: Roger Davis and Christopher Wright

- Barbados won the toss and elected to field.

=== Final ===
13 August 2014
Scorecard

Jamaica; 309/7 (50 overs)	v	Guyana; 91 (32.4 overs)
Natasha McLean 96 (94); Hasena Mohamed 2/50 (8 overs)		Hasena Mohamed 19* (29); Vanessa Watts 5/21 (8.4 overs)

Jamaica won by 218 runs
Windsor Park, Roseau
Umpires: Jonathan Blades and Lyndon Rajkumar

- Guyana won the toss and elected to field.
