= West Indies women's cricket team in England, Ireland and the Netherlands in 2008 =

West Indies women's cricket team in Ireland in 2008
	Ireland	West Indies
- Dates: 24 – 29 June 2008
Captains	Isobel Joyce	Nadine George

One Day International series
- Results: West Indies won the 3-match series 2–0
Most runs	Isobel Joyce (56)	Stafanie Taylor (80)
Most wickets	Isobel Joyce (4)	Afy Fletcher (4)

Twenty20 International series
- Results: West Indies won the 1-match series 1–0
Most runs	Cecelia Joyce (41)	Stafanie Taylor (90)
Most wickets	Isobel Joyce (2)	Kirbyina Alexander (3)

The West Indies women's cricket team toured Ireland, the Netherlands and England in June and July 2008. They first played Ireland in 3 One Day Internationals and 1 Twenty20 International, winning both series. The T20I was the first both sides played in the format. They then played a 4 match ODI series and a 2 match T20I series against the Netherlands, again winning both series. The first T20I in the series was the first ever played by the Netherlands in the format. Finally, they played England in 2 ODIs, with one match rained off and the other won by England.

== Tour of Ireland ==
=== Squads ===
Ireland	West Indies
Isobel Joyce (c); Emma Beamish; Jean Carroll (wk); Nicola Coffey; Marianne Herbert; Cecelia Joyce; Amy Kenealy; Joanne McKinley; Ciara Metcalfe; Cathy Murphy; Eimear Richardson; Melissa Scott-Hayward; Clare Shillington	Nadine George (c) (wk); Merissa Aguilleira; Kirbyina Alexander; Deandra Dottin; Afy Fletcher; Stacy-Ann King; Lee-Ann Kirby; Debbie-Ann Lewis; Anisa Mohammed; Chedean Nation; Juliana Nero; Gaitri Seetahal; Shakera Selman; Danielle Small; Charlene Taitt; Stafanie Taylor

=== WODI Series ===
==== 1st ODI ====
24 June 2008
Scorecard

Ireland; 123 (39.1 overs)	v	West Indies; 93/5 (17.1 overs)
Nicola Coffey 32 (61); Danielle Small 3/27 (8.1 overs)		Deandra Dottin 33* (41); Isobel Joyce 2/12 (4 overs)

West Indies Women won by 5 wickets (D/L)
Observatory Lane, Dublin
Umpires: Louis Fourie (Ire) and Rodney Molins (Ire)
Player of the match: Deandra Dottin (WI)

- West Indies Women won the toss and elected to field.
- Ireland Women innings reduced to 46 overs due to rain.
- West Indies Women target was 90 runs in 20 overs.
- Amy Kenealy, Melissa Scott-Hayward (Ire), Deandra Dottin, Stacy-Ann King, Chedean Nation, Shakera Selman, Danielle Small and Stafanie Taylor (WI) all made their WODI debuts.

==== 2nd ODI ====
26 June 2008
Scorecard

Ireland	v	West Indies

Match Abandoned
Castle Avenue, Dublin

- No toss.
- No play possible due to rain.

==== 3rd ODI ====
29 June 2008
Scorecard

Ireland; 163/9 (50 overs)	v	West Indies; 164/4 (35.5 overs)
Clare Shillington 54 (76); Afy Fletcher 4/22 (9 overs)		Stafanie Taylor 66* (97); Isobel Joyce 2/45 (9.5 overs)

West Indies Women won by 6 wickets
Malahide Cricket Club Ground, Dublin
Umpires: Louis Fourie (Ire) and Rodney Molins (Ire)
Player of the match: Stafanie Taylor (WI)

- Ireland Women won the toss and elected to bat.
- Joanne McKinley (Ire), Afy Fletcher and Charlene Taitt (WI) all made their WODI debuts.

=== Only T20I ===
27 June 2008
Scorecard

West Indies; 184/4 (20 overs)	v	Ireland; 109/7 (20 overs)
Stafanie Taylor 90 (49); Isobel Joyce 2/27 (4 overs)		Cecelia Joyce 41 (40); Kirbyina Alexander 3/20 (4 overs)

West Indies Women won by 75 runs
Rush Cricket Club, Rush
Umpires: Irvin Desal (Ire) and Rodney Molins (Ire)

- Ireland Women won the toss and elected to field.
- Emma Beamish, Jean Carroll, Nicola Coffey, Marianne Herbert, Cecelia Joyce, Isobel Joyce, Amy Kenealy, Cathy Murphy, Eimear Richardson, Melissa Scott-Hayward, Clare Shillington (Ire), Kirbyina Alexander, Deandra Dottin, Nadine George, Stacy-Ann King, Debbie-Ann Lewis, Anisa Mohammed, Chedean Nation, Juliana Nero, Shakera Selman, Danielle Small and Stafanie Taylor (WI) all made their WT20I debuts.

== Tour of the Netherlands ==
West Indies women's cricket team in the Netherlands in 2008
	Netherlands	West Indies
- Dates: 1 – 9 July 2008
Captains	Helmien Rambaldo	Nadine George

One Day International series
- Results: West Indies won the 4-match series 4–0
Most runs	Carolien Salomons (108)	Deandra Dottin (102)
Most wickets	Caroline de Fouw (6)	Shakera Selman (7)
- Player of the series: Stacy-Ann King (WI)

Twenty20 International series
- Results: West Indies won the 2-match series 2–0
Most runs	Helmien Rambaldo (45)	Stacy-Ann King (119)
Most wickets	Marloes Braat (3); Lotte Egging (3)	Anisa Mohammed (4)

=== Squads ===
Netherlands	West Indies
Helmien Rambaldo (c); Marloes Braat; Caroline de Fouw; Carlijn de Groot; Lotte Egging; Denise van Deventer; Jolet Hartenhof; Mandy Kornet; Cheraldine Oudolf; Jacqueline Pashley (wk); Carolien Salomons; Annemarie Tanke; Miranda Veringmeier; Violet Wattenberg (wk)	Nadine George (c) (wk); Merissa Aguilleira; Kirbyina Alexander; Deandra Dottin; Afy Fletcher; Stacy-Ann King; Lee-Ann Kirby; Debbie-Ann Lewis; Anisa Mohammed; Chedean Nation; Juliana Nero; Gaitri Seetahal; Shakera Selman; Danielle Small; Charlene Taitt; Stafanie Taylor

=== WT20I Series ===
==== 1st T20I ====
1 July 2008
Scorecard

Netherlands; 99/6 (20 overs)	v	West Indies; 100/3 (16.4 overs)
Helmien Rambaldo 28* (35); Anisa Mohammed 4/20 (4 overs)		Stacy-Ann King 40 (27); Lotte Egging 2/24 (3 overs)

West Indies Women won by 7 wickets
Sportpark Maarschalkerweerd, Utrecht
Umpires: Ingeborg Bevers (Net) and Steve Tovey (Net)
Player of the match: Anisa Mohammed (WI)

- West Indies Women won the toss and elected to field.
- Marloes Braat, Caroline de Fouw, Carlijn de Groot, Lotte Egging, Denise van Deventer, Jolet Hartenhof, Helmien Rambaldo, Carolien Salomons, Annemarie Tanke, Miranda Veringmeier, Violet Wattenberg (Net), Afy Fletcher and Lee-Ann Kirby (WI) all made their WT20I debuts.

==== 2nd T20I ====
6 July 2008
Scorecard

West Indies; 127/8 (20 overs)	v	Netherlands; 69/9 (20 overs)
Stacy-Ann King 79* (57); Caroline de Fouw 2/21 (4 overs)		Helmien Rambaldo 17 (27); Gaitri Seetahal 3/12 (3 overs)

West Indies Women won by 58 runs
Sportpark Het Schootsveld, Deventer
Umpires: Duco Ohm (Net) and Gerard Inden (Net)
Player of the match: Stacy-Ann King (WI)

- West Indies Women won the toss and elected to bat.
- Mandy Kornet, Cheraldine Oudolf, Jacqueline Pashley (Net), Gaitri Seetahal and Charlene Taitt (WI) all made their WT20I debuts.

=== WODI Series ===
==== 1st ODI ====
2 July 2008
Scorecard

West Indies; 239/6 (50 overs)	v	Netherlands; 180/6 (50 overs)
Charlene Taitt 47 (71); Caroline de Fouw 3/45 (9 overs)		Annemarie Tanke 61 (69); Debbie-Ann Lewis 2/23 (9 overs)

West Indies Women won by 59 runs
Sportpark Maarschalkerweerd, Utrecht
Umpires: Bob van Keulen (Net) and Ingeborg Bevers (Net)
Player of the match: Annemarie Tanke (Net)

- West Indies Women won the toss and elected to bat.
- Denise van Deventer, Miranda Veringmeier (Net), Merissa Aguilleira, Lee-Ann Kirby and Gaitri Seetahal (WI) all made their WODI debuts.

==== 2nd ODI ====
3 July 2008
Scorecard

West Indies; 144 (47.3 overs)	v	Netherlands; 117 (40 overs)
Juliana Nero 50 (105); Jolet Hartenhof 3/29 (9 overs)		Annemarie Tanke 36 (69); Kirbyina Alexander 3/24 (7 overs)

West Indies Women won by 20 runs (D/L)
Sportpark Maarschalkerweerd, Utrecht
Umpires: Erno Ruchtie (Net) and Willem Molenaar (Net)
Player of the match: Juliana Nero (WI)

- West Indies Women won the toss and elected to field.
- Netherlands Women innings reduced to 45 overs due to rain, target was 138.

==== 3rd ODI ====
7 July 2008
Scorecard

West Indies; 235/7 (50 overs)	v	Netherlands; 155 (48.3 overs)
Stafanie Taylor 70 (120); Lotte Egging 4/56 (10 overs)		Carolien Salomons 70* (119); Stacy-Ann King 3/33 (7.3 overs)

West Indies Women won by 80 runs
Sportpark Het Schootsveld, Deventer
Umpires: Gerard Inden (Net) and P Muthucumaru (Net)
Player of the match: Stafanie Taylor (WI)

- Netherlands Women won the toss and elected to field.

==== 4th ODI ====
9 July 2008
Scorecard

Netherlands; 22 (23.4 overs)	v	West Indies; 24/1 (4 overs)
Helmien Rambaldo 5 (28); Shakera Selman 4/11 (10 overs)		Lee-Ann Kirby 11* (14); Jolet Hartenhof 1/14 (2 overs)

West Indies Women won by 9 wickets
Sportpark Het Schootsveld, Deventer
Umpires: Bob van Keulen (Net) and Jacques Mulders (Net)
Player of the match: Kirbyina Alexander (WI)

- West Indies Women won the toss and elected to field.
- Netherlands Women's total of 22 is the lowest ever total in a Women's One Day International.

== Tour of England ==
West Indies women's cricket team in England in 2008
	England	West Indies
- Dates: 11 – 12 July 2008
Captains	Charlotte Edwards	Nadine George

One Day International series
- Results: England won the 2-match series 1–0
Most runs	Charlotte Edwards (60)	Charlene Taitt (8)
Most wickets	Isa Guha (5)	Kirbyina Alexander (1); Deandra Dottin (1)

=== Squads ===
England	West Indies
Charlotte Edwards (c); Lynsey Askew; Caroline Atkins; Katherine Brunt; Holly Colvin; Lydia Greenway; Isa Guha; Jenny Gunn; Laura Marsh; Beth Morgan; Ebony Rainford-Brent; Nicky Shaw; Anya Shrubsole; Sarah Taylor (wk); Claire Taylor	Nadine George (c) (wk); Merissa Aguilleira; Kirbyina Alexander; Deandra Dottin; Afy Fletcher; Stacy-Ann King; Lee-Ann Kirby; Debbie-Ann Lewis; Anisa Mohammed; Chedean Nation; Juliana Nero; Gaitri Seetahal; Shakera Selman; Danielle Small; Charlene Taitt; Stafanie Taylor

=== WODI Series ===
==== 1st ODI ====
11 July 2008
Scorecard

England; 156/4 (42.1 overs)	v	West Indies
Charlotte Edwards 60* (84); Kirbyina Alexander 1/23 (10 overs)

No result
Haslegrave Ground, Loughborough
Umpires: John Holder (Eng) and Michael Gough (Eng)

- England Women won the toss and elected to bat.
- No further play possible due to rain.

==== 2nd ODI ====
12 July 2008
Scorecard

West Indies; 41 (28.2 overs)	v	England; 42/0 (7.5 overs)
Charlene Taitt 8 (29); Isa Guha 5/14 (8 overs)		Sarah Taylor 30* (29)

England Women won by 10 wickets
Haslegrave Ground, Loughborough
Umpires: John Holder (Eng) and Michael Gough (Eng)

- England Women won the toss and elected to field.
- Match reduced to 48 overs per side due to rain.
