= 2009 Women's Cricket World Cup squads =

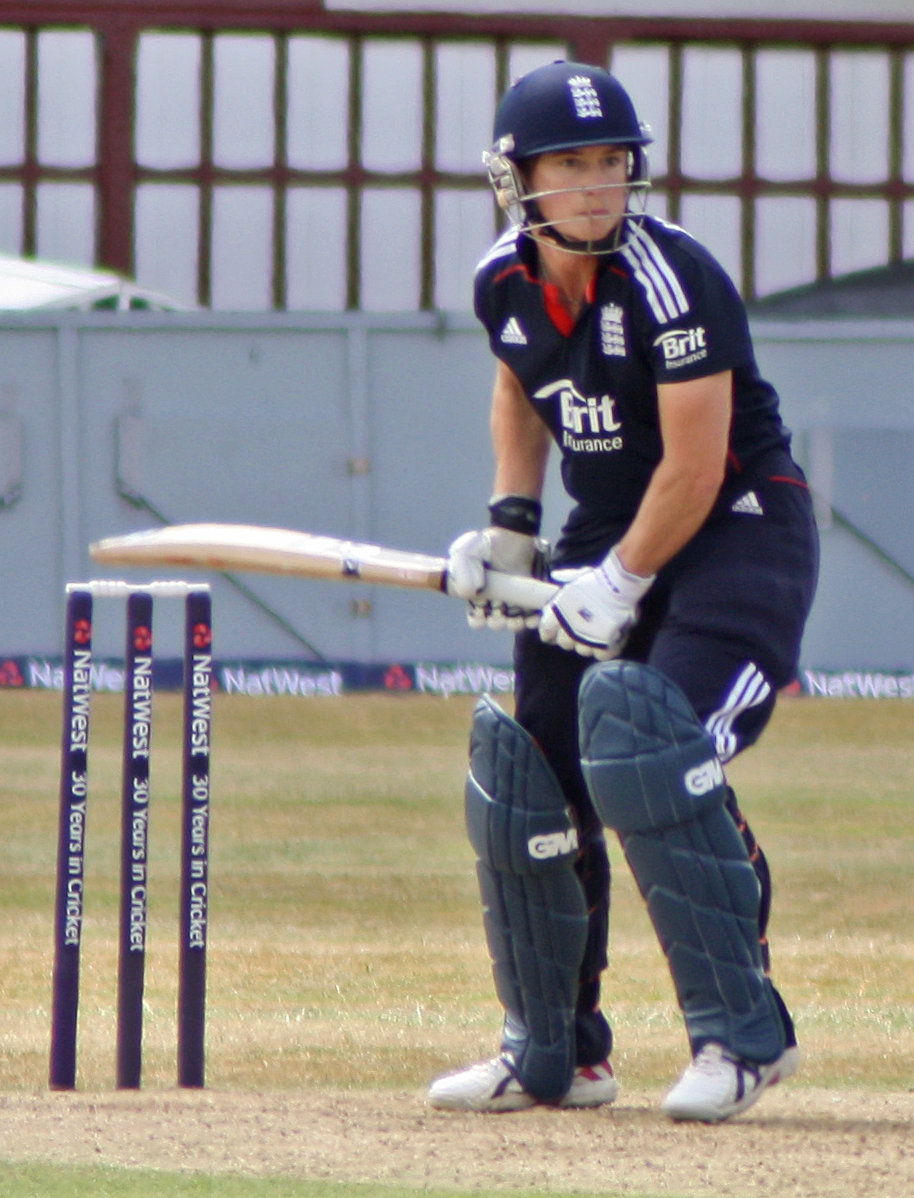
England's Claire Taylor was the tournament's leading run-scorer, accruing 324 runs.

The 2009 Women's Cricket World Cup squads consisted of 119 players from eight national women's cricket teams. Organised by the International Cricket Council (ICC), the 2009 Women's Cricket World Cup, held in Australia, was the ninth edition of the competition. England won the tournament for the second time, defeating New Zealand by four wickets in the final.

Each team selected a squad of up to 15 players, and any changes to that squad due to illness or injury had to be requested in writing and approved by the ICC's Event Technical Committee. Three such replacements were made to the squads, with South Africa, Sri Lanka and the West Indies making a change. England entered the tournament with the top-ranked players in both the ICC's batting and bowling rankings, Claire Taylor and Isa Guha respectively, but Australia were commonly listed in the press as favourites to win the tournament. Taylor finished the tournament as the leading run-scorer, accumulating 324 runs, and her England teammate Laura Marsh was the most prolific wicket-taker, claiming 16 wickets.

At the conclusion of the tournament, an ICC panel selected their team of the tournament. The player of the tournament, England's Claire Taylor, was one of five English players, along with Katherine Brunt, Marsh, Sarah Taylor, and Charlotte Edwards, the last of whom was chosen as the team's captain. Finalists New Zealand had two representatives—Suzie Bates and Kate Pulford, and in addition, Sophie Devine was selected as the twelfth player. Three Indians were included—Mithali Raj, Amita Sharma and Priyanka Roy—as was Shelley Nitschke of Australia.

== Key ==
Table headings
Bowling styles
Player notes
- Bat – Handedness when batting
- Bowl – Bowling style
- GP – Games played
- R – Runs scored
- A – Batting average
- W – Wickets taken
- E – Economy rate
- C – Catches
- S – Stumpings
- LM – Left-arm medium
- LF – Left-arm fast
- LFM – Left-arm fast-medium
- LMF – Left-arm medium-fast
- LB – Leg break
- LBG – Leg break googly
- RM – Right-arm medium
- RF – Right-arm fast
- RFM – Right-arm fast-medium
- RMF – Right-arm medium-fast
- SLA – Slow left-arm orthodox
- OB – Off break
- (c) – Captain
- (vc) – Vice-captain
- † – Wicket-keeper
- ^{W} – Withdrawn player (non-sortable)

== Australia ==
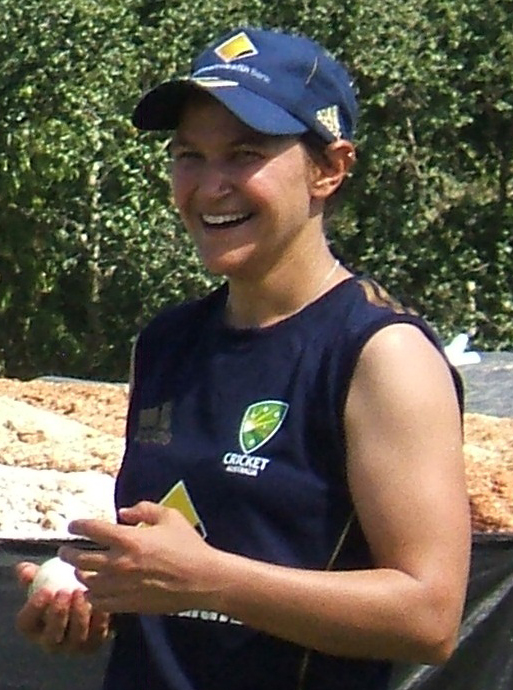
Shelley Nitschke was Australia's leading run-scorer during the competition, accruing 275 runs.

Australian squad for the 2009 Women's Cricket World Cup
Player	Date of birth	Bat	Bowl	GP	R	A	W	E	C	S
Sarah Andrews	16 December 1981 (aged 27)	Right	RFM	4	0	–	5	3.90	2	0
Alex Blackwell (vc)	31 August 1983 (aged 25)	Right	RM	7	190	38.00	–	–	3	0
Jess Cameron	27 June 1989 (aged 19)	Right	LBG	6	66	16.50	–	–	6	0
Leonie Coleman †	5 February 1979 (aged 30)	Right	–	1	12	–	–	–	0	0
Lauren Ebsary	15 March 1983 (aged 25)	Right	RM	4	106	35.33	–	–	1	0
Rene Farrell	13 January 1987 (aged 22)	Right	RFM	6	29	29.00	7	3.25	2	0
Jodie Fields †	19 June 1984 (aged 24)	Right	RM	7	153	38.25	–	–	5	4
Delissa Kimmince	14 May 1989 (aged 19)	Right	RM	2	0	–	0	3.50	1	0
Shelley Nitschke	3 December 1976 (aged 32)	Left	SLA	7	275	39.28	7	3.45	5	0
Erin Osborne	27 June 1989 (aged 19)	Right	OB	6	10	10.00	9	3.01	2	0
Ellyse Perry	3 November 1990 (aged 18)	Right	RFM	6	67	22.33	9	4.42	1	0
Leah Poulton	27 February 1984 (aged 25)	Right	LBG	5	94	18.80	2	3.40	1	0
Karen Rolton (c)	21 November 1974 (aged 34)	Left	LM	6	220	55.00	–	–	2	0
Emma Sampson	29 July 1985 (aged 23)	Right	RFM	4	–	–	2	4.46	1	0
Lisa Sthalekar	13 August 1979 (aged 29)	Right	OB	6	70	14.00	13	3.45	4	0

== England ==
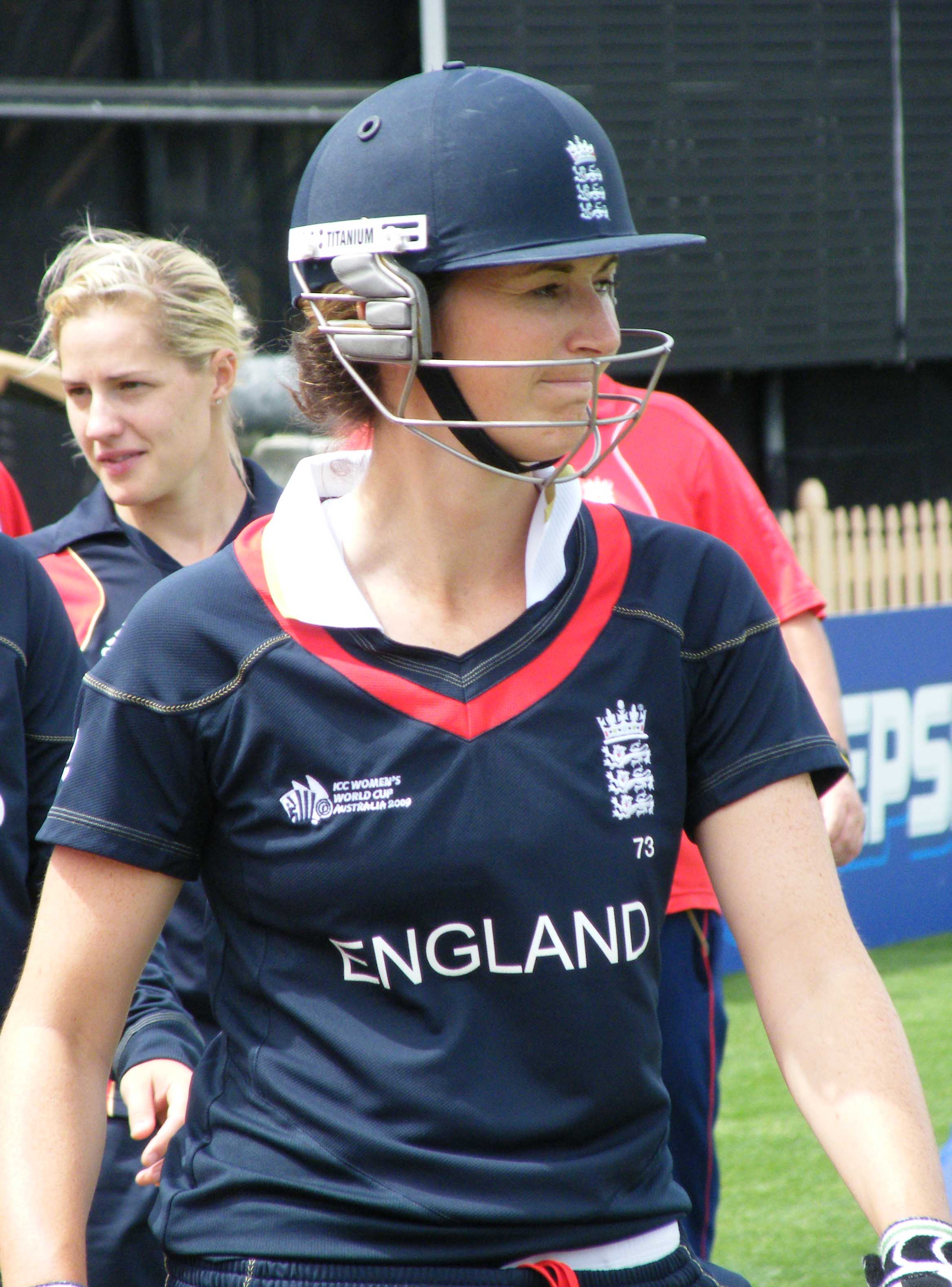
Charlotte Edwards captained the winning England team.

English squad for the 2009 Women's Cricket World Cup
Player	Date of birth	Bat	Bowl	GP	R	A	W	E	C	S
Caroline Atkins	13 January 1981 (aged 28)	Right	–	7	251	50.20	–	–	4	0
Katherine Brunt	2 July 1985 (aged 23)	Right	RMF	5	–	–	6	2.93	1	0
Holly Colvin	7 September 1989 (aged 19)	Right	SLA	7	10	5.00	9	2.65	1	0
Charlotte Edwards (c)	17 December 1979 (aged 29)	Right	LB	7	137	27.40	9	3.34	1	0
Lydia Greenway	6 August 1985 (aged 23)	Left	OB	7	80	20.00	–	–	8	0
Lauren Griffiths †	14 February 1987 (aged 22)	Right	–	0	–	–	–	–	–	–
Isa Guha	21 May 1985 (aged 23)	Right	RF	5	3	–	3	3.85	4	0
Jenny Gunn	9 May 1986 (aged 22)	Right	RMF	5	52	26.00	5	3.82	0	0
Laura Marsh	5 December 1986 (aged 22)	Right	RFM	6	13	13.00	16	2.91	2	0
Beth Morgan	27 September 1981 (aged 27)	Right	RMF	7	49	12.25	0	8.50	1	0
Ebony-Jewel Rainford-Brent	31 December 1983 (aged 25)	Right	RFM	1	18	18.00	–	–	0	0
Nicky Shaw	30 December 1981 (aged 27)	Right	RFM	5	41	41.00	6	3.54	0	0
Anya Shrubsole	7 December 1991 (aged 17)	Right	RM	1	–	–	0	3.85	1	0
Claire Taylor	25 September 1975 (aged 33)	Right	–	7	324	64.80	–	–	2	0
Sarah Taylor †	20 May 1989 (aged 19)	Right	–	7	216	30.85	–	–	6	3

== India ==
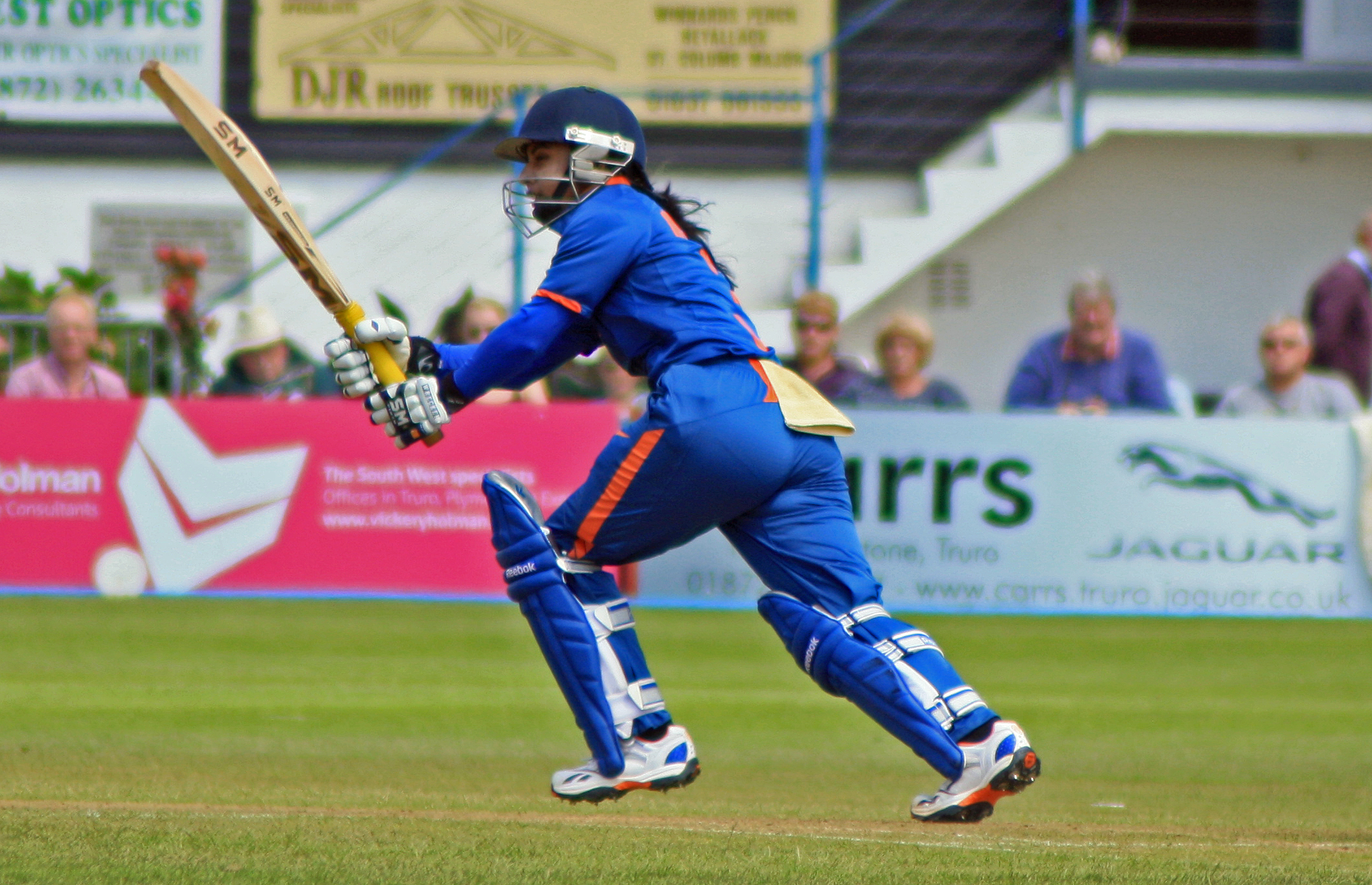
Mithali Raj was India's leading run-scorer during the competition, accruing 247 runs.

Indian squad for the 2009 Women's Cricket World Cup
Player	Date of birth	Bat	Bowl	GP	R	A	W	E	C	S
Anjum Chopra	20 May 1977 (aged 31)	Left	RM	7	164	27.33	–	–	0	0
Anagha Deshpande †	19 November 1985 (aged 23)	Right	–	6	146	29.20	–	–	3	4
Rumeli Dhar	9 December 1983 (aged 25)	Right	RM	7	33	11.00	10	3.23	1	0
Jhulan Goswami (c)	25 November 1983 (aged 25)	Right	RM	7	51	17.00	4	2.53	5	0
Thirush Kamini	30 July 1990 (aged 18)	Left	LB	6	17	4.25	0	5.25	2	0
Harmanpreet Kaur	8 March 1989 (aged 19)	Right	RMF	6	40	20.00	0	4.00	2	0
Reema Malhotra	17 October 1980 (aged 28)	Right	LB	4	64	64.00	3	4.36	0	0
Sravanthi Naidu	23 August 1986 (aged 22)	Right	SLA	3	2	1.00	1	5.14	0	0
Sulakshana Naik †	10 November 1978 (aged 30)	Right	–	2	67	67.00	–	–	3	2
Snehal Pradhan	18 March 1986 (aged 22)	Right	RMF	0	–	–	–	–	–	–
Mithali Raj	3 December 1982 (aged 26)	Right	LB	7	247	61.75	–	–	2	0
Poonam Raut	14 October 1989 (aged 19)	Right	OB	1	0	0.00	1	0.80	1	0
Priyanka Roy	2 March 1988 (aged 21)	Right	LB	7	16	4.00	12	4.27	3	0
Amita Sharma (vc)	12 September 1982 (aged 26)	Right	RMF	7	83	20.75	9	3.15	5	0
Gouher Sultana	31 March 1988 (aged 20)	Right	SLA	7	11	11.00	9	2.55	3	0

== New Zealand ==
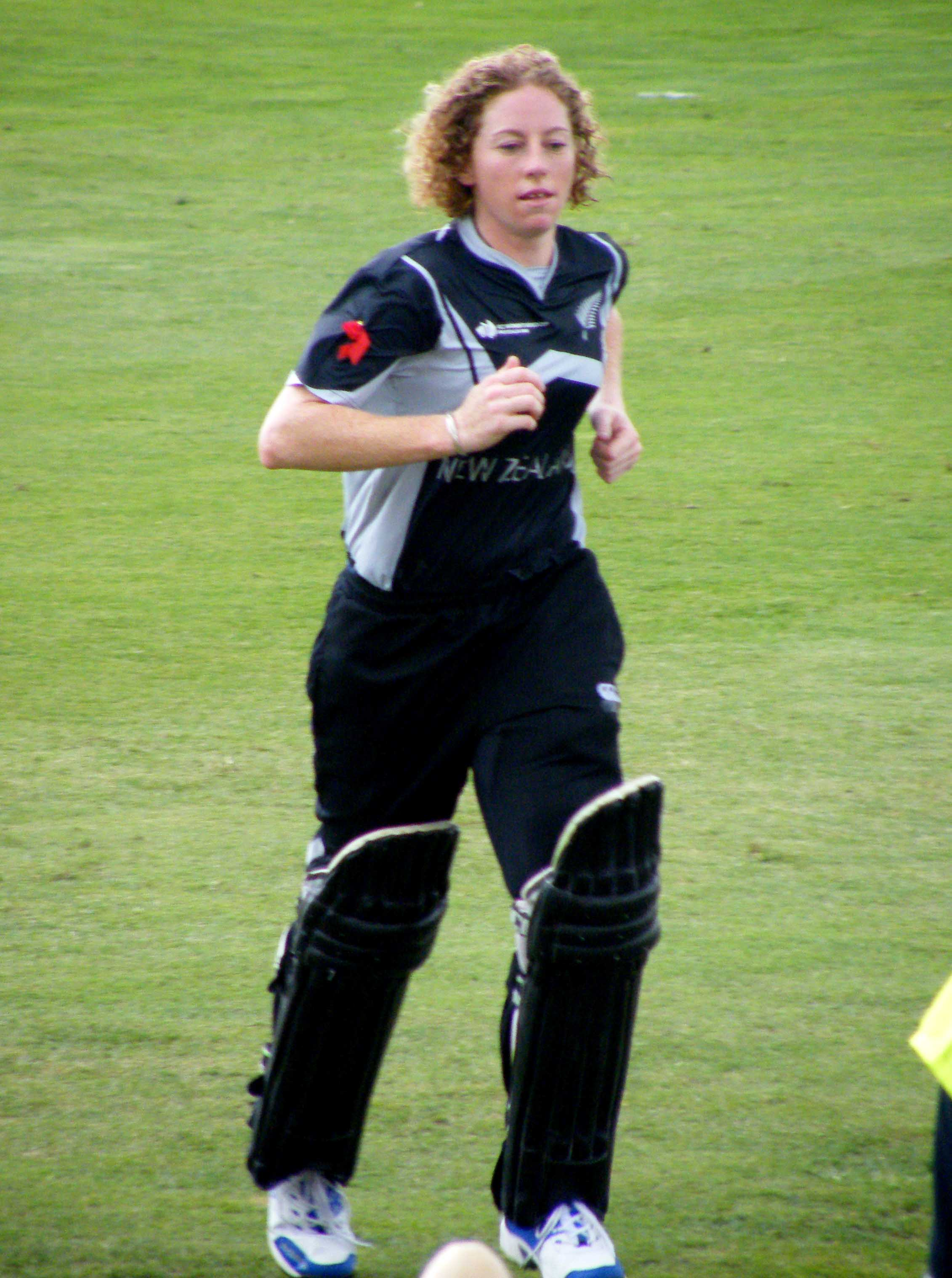
Haidee Tiffen retired from international cricket after captaining New Zealand to the final.

New Zealand squad for the 2009 Women's Cricket World Cup
Player	Date of birth	Bat	Bowl	GP	R	A	W	E	C	S
Suzie Bates	16 September 1987 (aged 21)	Right	RM	7	275	45.83	4	4.66	2	0
Nicola Browne	14 September 1983 (aged 25)	Right	RM	7	142	35.50	4	3.30	2	0
Abby Burrows	29 January 1977 (aged 32)	Left	RM	2	3	–	1	3.53	2	0
Sophie Devine	1 September 1989 (aged 19)	Right	RM	6	17	4.25	8	3.65	2	0
Lucy Doolan	11 December 1987 (aged 21)	Right	OB	6	63	21.00	9	2.63	2	0
Katey Martin	7 February 1985 (aged 24)	Right	–	2	13	6.50	–	–	1	0
Aimee Mason (vc)	11 October 1982 (aged 26)	Left	OB	7	105	15.00	11	3.25	1	0
Sara McGlashan †	28 March 1982 (aged 26)	Right	–	7	174	29.00	–	–	2	0
Beth McNeill	10 November 1982 (aged 26)	Right	RM	2	–	–	0	2.61	1	0
Rachel Priest †	13 June 1985 (aged 23)	Right	–	6	29	14.50	–	–	7	1
Kate Pulford	27 August 1980 (aged 28)	Right	RM	6	115	19.16	6	3.50	0	0
Amy Satterthwaite	7 October 1986 (aged 22)	Left	RM	6	162	27.00	0	7.00	2	0
Haidee Tiffen (c)	4 September 1979 (aged 29)	Right	RM	6	279	46.50	–	–	2	0
Sarah Tsukigawa	16 January 1982 (aged 27)	Right	RM	7	70	23.33	3	3.18	1	0

== Pakistan ==
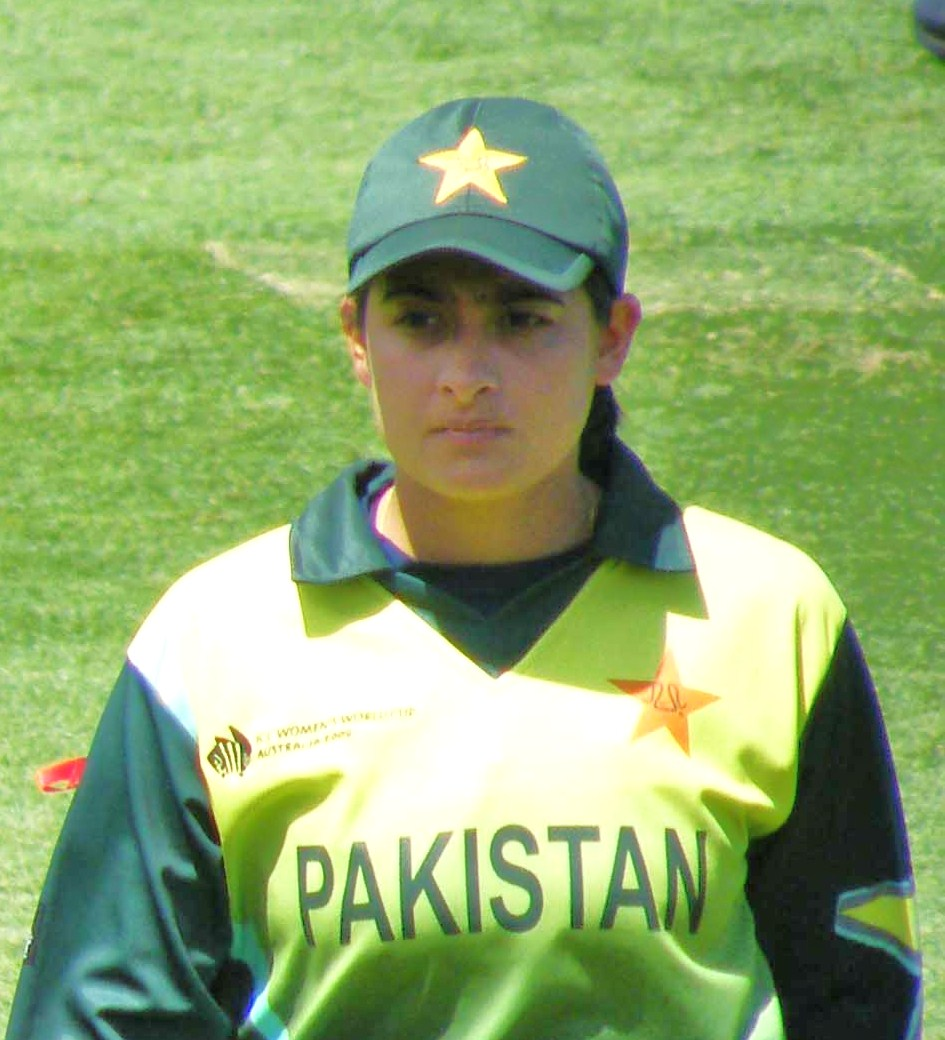
Sana Mir was Pakistan's leading wicket-taker in the tournament.

Pakistani squad for the 2009 Women's Cricket World Cup
Player	Date of birth	Bat	Bowl	GP	R	A	W	E	C	S
Almas Akram	15 April 1988 (aged 20)	Left	LMF	5	12	4.00	4	3.58	0	0
Armaan Khan †	4 April 1980 (aged 28)	Right	–	5	51	12.75	–	–	2	0
Asmavia Iqbal	1 January 1988 (aged 21)	Right	RMF	7	96	16.00	2	5.14	1	0
Batool Fatima †	14 August 1982 (aged 26)	Right	RMF	5	2	0.66	–	–	2	1
Bismah Maroof	18 July 1991 (aged 17)	Left	LB	7	103	14.71	–	–	3	0
Javeria Khan	14 May 1988 (aged 20)	Right	OB	7	35	7.00	2	3.72	3	0
Nahida Khan	3 November 1986 (aged 22)	Right	RM	0	–	–	–	–	–	–
Naila Nazir	30 March 1989 (aged 19)	Right	LB	2	10	10.00	2	5.50	2	0
Nain Abidi	23 May 1985 (aged 23)	Right	–	7	152	21.71	–	–	0	0
Qanita Jalil	21 March 1980 (aged 28)	Right	RMF	7	55	9.16	6	4.17	1	0
Sajjida Shah	3 February 1988 (aged 21)	Right	OB	7	49	7.00	5	4.56	0	0
Sana Mir (vc)	5 January 1986 (aged 23)	Right	LB	7	56	9.33	9	2.82	2	0
Sania Khan	23 March 1985 (aged 23)	Right	RM	2	4	4.00	0	8.40	0	0
Sukhan Faiz	9 March 1988 (aged 20)	Right	–	2	17	8.50	–	–	1	0
Urooj Mumtaz (c)	1 October 1985 (aged 23)	Right	LB	7	98	19.60	3	4.27	0	0

== South Africa ==
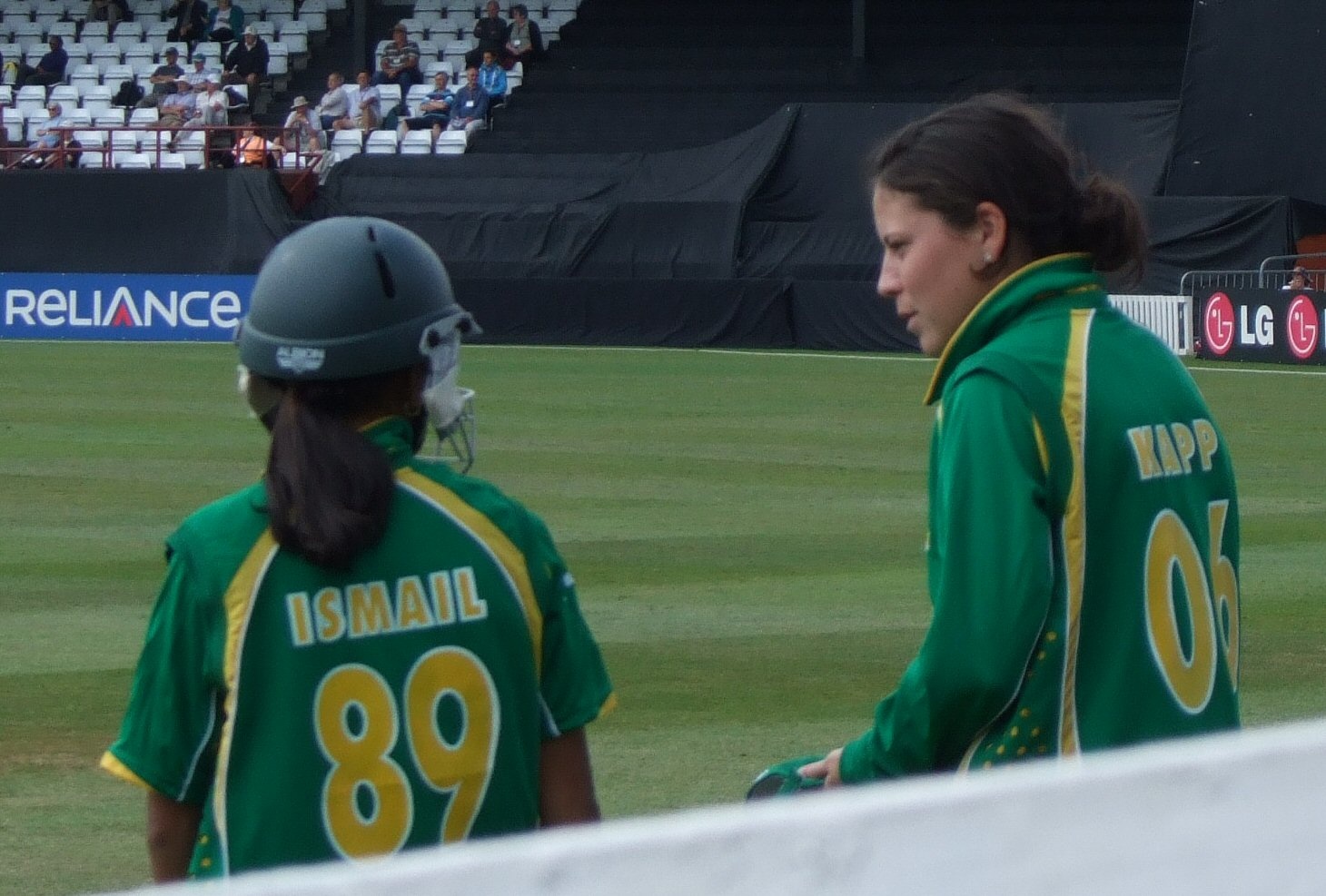
Marizanne Kapp (right), replaced Kirstie Thomson in the South African squad.

South African squad for the 2009 Women's Cricket World Cup
Player	Date of birth	Bat	Bowl	GP	R	A	W	E	C	S
Susan Benade	16 February 1982 (aged 27)	Right	RMF	3	16	5.33	0	6.55	2	0
Cri-zelda Brits	20 November 1983 (aged 25)	Right	RMF	4	99	33.00	–	–	2	0
Trisha Chetty †	26 June 1988 (aged 20)	Right	–	4	124	41.33	–	–	3	0
Mignon du Preez	13 June 1989 (aged 19)	Right	–	4	48	16.00	–	–	0	0
Shandre Fritz	21 June 1985 (aged 23)	Right	RM	2	18	18.00	–	–	0	0
Shabnim Ismail	5 October 1988 (aged 20)	Left	RFM	3	10	5.00	1	4.83	0	0
Marizanne Kapp	4 January 1990 (aged 19)	Right	RM	2	7	3.50	0	8.33	0	0
Ashlyn Kilowan	19 December 1982 (aged 26)	Left	LM	4	9	4.50	2	3.36	2	0
Marcia Letsoalo	11 April 1984 (aged 24)	Right	RM	2	0	0.00	0	4.12	1	0
Sunette Loubser (c)	26 September 1982 (aged 26)	Right	OB	3	5	2.50	0	3.90	0	0
Alicia Smith (vc)	13 March 1984 (aged 24)	Right	RFM	4	65	21.66	7	4.38	1	0
Claire Terblanche	20 October 1984 (aged 24)	Right	OB	1	2	2.00	–	–	0	0
Charlize van der Westhuizen	17 February 1984 (aged 25)	Right	SLA	4	10	5.00	6	1.75	1	0
Yolandi van der Westhuizen †	11 December 1981 (aged 27)	Right	–	2	1	0.50	–	–	0	0
Dane van Niekerk	14 May 1993 (aged 15)	Right	LB	2	1	1.00	4	2.33	0	0
Kirstie Thomson^{W}	21 October 1988 (aged 20)	Right	RM	Replaced by Marizanne Kapp						

== Sri Lanka ==
Sri Lankan squad for the 2009 Women's Cricket World Cup
Player	Date of birth	Bat	Bowl	GP	R	A	W	E	C	S
Sanduni Abeywickrema	12 December 1982 (aged 26)	Right	OB	1	15	15.00	–	–	0	0
Suwini de Alwis	17 May 1975 (aged 33)	Left	SLA	4	65	16.25	4	3.51	0	0
Hiruka Fernando	30 September 1976 (aged 32)	Left	SLA	3	29	9.66	0	10.00	1	0
Rose Fernando	28 July 1979 (aged 29)	Right	OB	4	8	8.00	1	3.58	0	0
Inoka Galagedara	17 July 1977 (aged 31)	Right	RFM	3	19	6.33	–	–	2	0
Gayathri Kariyawasam	25 December 1976 (aged 32)	Right	RF	0	–	–	–	–	–	–
Eshani Lokusuriyage	1 June 1984 (aged 24)	Right	RM	4	30	7.50	4	3.91	1	0
Dilani Manodara †	8 December 1982 (aged 26)	Right	–	4	40	13.33	–	–	1	0
Chamari Polgampola	20 March 1981 (aged 27)	Left	RMF	4	32	8.00	2	3.00	2	0
Udeshika Prabodhani	20 September 1985 (aged 23)	Right	LM	4	1	0.50	3	3.10	0	0
Deepika Rasangika	13 December 1983 (aged 25)	Left	LB	1	1	1.00	–	–	0	0
Dedunu Silva	12 February 1978 (aged 31)	Right	RM	4	68	17.00	–	–	1	0
Shashikala Siriwardene (c)	14 February 1985 (aged 24)	Right	OB	4	72	18.00	3	3.54	2	0
Sripali Weerakkody	7 January 1986 (aged 23)	Left	RM	4	20	6.66	0	4.13	0	0
Chandi Wickramasinghe	27 March 1983 (aged 25)	Right	RFM	0	–	–	–	–	–	–
Chamani Seneviratna^{W}	14 November 1978 (aged 30)	Right	RM	Replaced by Sanduni Abeywickrema						

== West Indies ==
West Indian squad for the 2009 Women's Cricket World Cup
Player	Date of birth	Bat	Bowl	GP	R	A	W	E	C	S
Merissa Aguilleira (c) †	14 December 1985 (aged 23)	Right	–	7	23	3.28	–	–	4	0
Kirbyina Alexander (vc)	6 July 1987 (aged 21)	Right	RF	7	28	7.00	5	3.94	2	0
Shanel Daley	25 December 1988 (aged 20)	Left	LM	4	54	18.00	7	3.92	1	0
Deandra Dottin	21 June 1991 (aged 17)	Right	RFM	7	108	15.42	1	7.00	2	0
Afy Fletcher	17 March 1987 (aged 21)	Right	OB	5	36	9.00	2	4.56	0	0
Geneille Greaves	21 February 1983 (aged 26)	Right	OB	1	3	3.00	–	–	1	0
Cordel Jack	22 February 1982 (aged 27)	Right	OB	5	50	10.00	0	5.66	1	0
Stacy-Ann King	17 July 1983 (aged 25)	Left	LM	5	22	4.40	–	–	1	0
Pamela Lavine	12 March 1969 (aged 39)	Right	RF	6	115	19.16	3	3.76	2	0
Debbie-Ann Lewis	7 August 1969 (aged 39)	Right	RM	5	56	14.00	4	2.74	1	0
Anisa Mohammed	7 August 1988 (aged 20)	Right	OB	5	25	25.00	4	3.57	1	0
Shakera Selman	1 September 1989 (aged 19)	Right	RM	7	6	–	4	3.22	1	0
Danielle Small	16 March 1989 (aged 19)	Right	RMF	3	14	7.00	1	3.14	0	0
Charlene Taitt	2 September 1984 (aged 24)	Right	OB	3	27	13.50	2	4.40	1	0
Stafanie Taylor	11 June 1991 (aged 17)	Right	OB	7	195	27.85	10	2.84	5	0
Juliana Nero^{W}	14 July 1979 (aged 29)	Right	RM	Replaced by Debbie-Ann Lewis						
