= 2013 Regional Women's Twenty20 Championship =

- Dates: 16 August – 22 August 2013
- Administrator(s): Cricket West Indies
- Cricket format: Twenty20
- Tournament format(s): Round robin and knockout finals
- Champions: Jamaica (2nd title)
- Participants: 8
- Matches: 17
- Most runs: Stafanie Taylor (170)
- Most wickets: Kirbyina Alexander (11)

The 2013 Regional Women's Twenty20 Championship was the second season of the women's Twenty20 cricket competition played in the West Indies. It took place in August 2013, with 8 teams taking part and all matches taking place in Grenada. Jamaica won the tournament, beating Barbados in the final to claim their second T20 title.

The tournament followed the 2013 Regional Women's Championship.

== Competition format ==
The eight teams were divided into two groups of four, playing in a round-robin format. Matches were played using a Twenty20 format. The top two teams in each group progressed to the semi-finals, whilst the bottom two teams in each group played-off in two play-off matches.

The group worked on a points system with positions being based on the total points. Points were awarded as follows:

Win: 5 points
Loss: 0 points.
Abandoned/No Result: 3 points.

== Points table ==
=== Group A ===
Pos	Team	Pld	W	L	Pts	NRR	Qualification
1	Barbados	3	3	0	30	1.322	Advanced to the semi-finals
2	Jamaica	3	2	1	20	2.577	Advanced to the semi-finals
3	Saint Vincent and the Grenadines	3	1	2	10	−1.498	Advanced to the play-offs
4	Saint Lucia	3	0	3	0	−2.676	Advanced to the play-offs

Source: Windies Cricket

=== Group B ===
Pos	Team	Pld	W	L	Pts	NRR	Qualification
1	Guyana	3	3	0	30	2.206	Advanced to the semi-finals
2	Trinidad and Tobago	3	2	1	20	2.665	Advanced to the semi-finals
3	Grenada	3	1	2	10	−1.398	Advanced to the play-offs
4	Dominica	3	0	3	0	−3.680	Advanced to the play-offs

Source: Windies Cricket

== Knockout stage ==
=== Play-offs ===
21 August 2013
Scorecard

Dominica; 75/4 (20 overs)	v	Saint Vincent and the Grenadines; 78/2 (13.2 overs)
Pearl Etienne 37* (30); Roshelle John 1/11 (4 overs)		Crystal John 34* (40); Pearl Etienne 1/17 (4 overs)

Saint Vincent and the Grenadines won by 8 wickets
Queen's Park, St. George's
Umpires: Kevin Sisnett and Ryan Willoughby
Player of the match: Crystal John

- Dominica won the toss and elected to bat.

21 August 2013
Scorecard

Saint Lucia; 58 (19.4 overs)	v	Grenada; 59/2 (11.2 overs)
Roylin Cooper 15 (49); Aria Fortune 3/17 (4 overs)		Rachel Cyrus 24 (25); Roylin Cooper 1/11 (1.2 overs)

Grenada won by 8 wickets
Tanteen Recreation Ground, St. George's
Umpires: Anthony Sanowar and Troy Tudor
Player of the match: Aria Fortune

- Saint Lucia won the toss and elected to bat.

=== Semi-finals ===
21 August 2013
Scorecard

Barbados; 116/5 (20 overs)	v	Trinidad and Tobago; 86/7 (20 overs)
Shaquana Quintyne 50* (53); Kirbyina Alexander 3/19 (4 overs)		Merissa Aguilleira 22 (32); Shaquana Quintyne 3/14 (4 overs)

Barbados won by 30 runs
Queen's Park, St. George's
Umpires: I Bookhan and Roger Davis
Player of the match: Shaquana Quintyne

- Trinidad and Tobago won the toss and elected to field.

21 August 2013
Scorecard

Guyana; 97 (19.4 overs)	v	Jamaica; 99/5 (19.4 overs)
Tremayne Smartt 35 (25); Shanel Daley 2/9 (4 overs)		Tameka Sanford 27* (29); Plaffiana Millington 2/9 (4 overs)

Jamaica won by 5 wickets
Tanteen Recreation Ground, St. George's
Umpires: Kellman Kowlessar and Francis Maurice
Player of the match: Tameka Sanford

- Guyana won the toss and elected to bat.

=== Final ===
22 August 2013
Scorecard

Barbados; 105/7 (20 overs)	v	Jamaica; 106/4 (16.5 overs)
Kycia Knight 25 (32); Vanessa Watts 2/17 (4 overs)		Natasha McLean 44 (45); Shakera Selman 2/18 (4 overs)

Jamaica won by 6 wickets
Queen's Park, St. George's
Umpires: Francis Maurice and Anthony Sanowar
Player of the match: Stafanie Taylor

- Barbados won the toss and elected to bat.

== Statistics ==
=== Most runs ===
Player	Team	Matches	Innings	Runs	Average	HS	100s	50s
Stafanie Taylor	Jamaica	5	5	170	56.66	61*	0	2
Shaquana Quintyne	Barbados	5	5	116	58.00	50*	0	1
Shemaine Campbelle	Guyana	4	4	101	25.25	37	0	0
Natasha McLean	Jamaica	5	5	99	19.80	44	0	0
Deandra Dottin	Barbados	5	5	87	21.75	47*	0	0

Source: CricketArchive

=== Most wickets ===
Player	Team	Overs	Wickets	Average	BBI	5w
Kirbyina Alexander	Trinidad and Tobago	15.0	11	6.90	4/18	0
Plaffiana Millington	Guyana	15.0	7	6.42	3/6	0
Tremayne Smartt	Guyana	16.0	6	8.00	3/7	0
Sheree-Ann John	Saint Vincent and the Grenadines	14.0	6	9.33	3/13	0
Erva Giddings	Guyana	14.0	6	11.66	4/22	0

Source: CricketArchive
