= 2012 Regional Women's Twenty20 Championship =

- Dates: 8 August – 18 August 2012
- Administrator(s): Cricket West Indies
- Cricket format: Twenty20
- Tournament format(s): Round robin and final
- Champions: Jamaica (1st title)
- Participants: 8
- Matches: 32
- Most runs: Stafanie Taylor (409)
- Most wickets: Shaquana Quintyne (15)

The 2012 Regional Women's Twenty20 Championship was the inaugural season of the women's Twenty20 cricket competition played in the West Indies. It took place in August 2012, with 8 teams taking part and all matches taking place in Jamaica. Jamaica won the tournament, beating Trinidad and Tobago in the final.

== Competition format ==
The teams played in a round-robin group of eight, therefore playing seven matches. Matches were played using a Twenty20 format. The top two teams in each group progressed to the final, whilst the other teams competed in 3rd, 5th and 7th-place play-offs.

The group worked on a points system with positions being based on the total points. Points were awarded as follows:

Win: 5 points
Loss: 0 points.
Abandoned/No Result: 1 point.

== Points table ==
Pos	Team	Pld	W	L	Pts	NRR	Qualification
1	Trinidad and Tobago (R)	7	6	1	30	3.756	Advanced to the final
2	Jamaica (C)	7	6	1	30	2.579	Advanced to the final
3	Barbados	7	6	1	30	2.120	Advanced to the 3rd-place play-off
4	Guyana	7	4	3	20	1.271	Advanced to the 3rd-place play-off
5	Saint Vincent and the Grenadines	7	3	4	15	−0.150	Advanced to the 5th-place play-off
6	Grenada	7	2	5	10	−1.896	Advanced to the 5th-place play-off
7	Saint Lucia	7	1	6	5	−2.940	Advanced to the 7th-place play-off
8	Dominica	7	0	7	0	−4.541	Advanced to the 7th-place play-off

Source: Windies Cricket
(C) Champions; (R) Runners-up

== Play-offs ==
=== 3rd-place play-off ===
18 August 2012
Scorecard

Guyana; 88/7 (20 overs)	v	Barbados; 89/3 (17.3 overs)
June Ogle 30 (–); Pamela Lavine 3/13 (4 overs)		Pamela Lavine 21 (–); Subrina Munroe 1/13 (3 overs)

Barbados won by 7 wickets
Sabina Park, Kingston
Umpires: Patrick Gustard and Christopher Taylor

- Guyana won the toss and elected to bat.

=== 5th-place play-off ===
18 August 2012
Scorecard

Saint Vincent and the Grenadines; 116/4 (20 overs)	v	Grenada; 96/3 (20 overs)
Cordel Jack 49* (–); Afy Fletcher 2/23 (4 overs)		Debbie-Ann Lewis 36* (–); Cordel Jack 2/20 (4 overs)

Saint Vincent and the Grenadines won by 20 runs
Kensington Park, Kingston
Umpires: Erickson Degalarie and Verdayne Smith

- Saint Vincent and the Grenadines won the toss and elected to bat.

=== 7th-place play-off ===
18 August 2012
Scorecard

Saint Lucia; 97/7 (20 overs)	v	Dominica; 88/8 (20 overs)
Paulina Francis 23 (–); Anika Benjamin 4/22 (4 overs)		Shanita Graham 21 (–); Chemika Abraham 2/10 (4 overs)

Saint Lucia won by 9 runs
Kensington Park, Kingston
Umpires: Colin Alfred and Lyndon Rajkumar

- Saint Lucia won the toss and elected to bat.

== Final ==
18 August 2012
Scorecard

Jamaica; 101/5 (20 overs)	v	Trinidad and Tobago; 85 (18.1 overs)
Stafanie Taylor 57* (–); Stacy-Ann King 2/12 (3 overs)		Britney Cooper 18 (–); Stafanie Taylor 4/9 (4 overs)

Jamaica won by 16 runs
Sabina Park, Kingston
Umpires: Athol Hamilton and Carl Tuckett

- Jamaica won the toss and elected to bat.

== Statistics ==
=== Most runs ===
Player	Team	Matches	Innings	Runs	Average	HS	100s	50s
Stafanie Taylor	Jamaica	8	8	409	81.80	114*	1	2
Amanda Samaroo	Trinidad and Tobago	8	8	288	41.14	98	0	2
Cordel Jack	Saint Vincent and the Grenadines	8	8	268	44.66	63*	0	2
June Ogle	Guyana	8	8	256	51.20	58*	0	2
Kycia Knight	Barbados	8	8	212	30.28	93	0	1

Source: CricketArchive

=== Most wickets ===
Player	Team	Overs	Wickets	Average	BBI	5w
Shaquana Quintyne	Barbados	32.0	15	7.13	4/9	0
Stafanie Taylor	Jamaica	23.0	13	6.15	4/9	0
Shanel Daley	Jamaica	26.1	13	7.84	3/9	0
Afy Fletcher	Grenada	30.0	11	13.36	4/10	0
Roshana Outar	Jamaica	26.0	10	7.70	4/0	0

Source: CricketArchive
