= 2017 Women's Cricket World Cup =

Cricket tournament

- Dates: 24 June – 23 July 2017
- Administrator: International Cricket Council
- Cricket format: Women's One Day International
- Tournament format(s): Round-robin and Knockout
- Hosts: England; Wales
- Champions: England (4th title)
- Runners-up: India
- Participants: 8
- Matches: 31
- Player of the series: (England) Tammy Beaumont
- Most runs: (England) Tammy Beaumont (410)
- Most wickets: (South Africa) Dane van Niekerk (15)
- Official website: Official site

The 2017 ICC Women's Cricket World Cup was an international women's cricket tournament that took place in England from 24 June to 23 July 2017. It was the eleventh edition of the Women's Cricket World Cup, and the third to be held in England (after the 1973 and 1993 tournaments). The 2017 World Cup was the first in which all participating players were fully professional. Eight teams qualified to participate in the tournament. England won the final at Lord's on 23 July, after India fell short by 9 runs in pursuit of England's total of 228/7.

== Qualification ==
The 2014–16 ICC Women's Championship, featuring the top eight ranked teams in women's cricket, was the first phase of qualifying for the World Cup, with the top four teams qualifying automatically. The remaining four places were decided at the 2017 World Cup Qualifier, a ten-team event that was held in Sri Lanka in February 2017. This featured the bottom four teams from the ICC Women's Championship and six other teams.

Team	Mode of qualification
Australia	Women's Championship
England	Women's Championship
New Zealand	Women's Championship
West Indies	Women's Championship
India	World Cup Qualifier
South Africa	World Cup Qualifier
Sri Lanka	World Cup Qualifier
Pakistan	World Cup Qualifier

== Venues ==
On 8 February 2016, the International Cricket Council (ICC) announced the five venues for the 2017 Women's World Cup. Lord's hosted the final, and other matches were played at the home grounds of Derbyshire, Leicestershire, Somerset and Gloucestershire.

London	Derby	Bristol	Leicester	Taunton
Lord's	County Ground	Bristol County Ground	Grace Road	County Ground
Capacity: 28,000	Capacity: 9,500	Capacity: 17,500	Capacity: 12,000	Capacity: 12,500

== Squads ==
The captains of each team were announced on 21 April 2017, with the full squads named shortly after.

== Match officials ==
The ICC announced a panel of thirteen umpires and three match referees to officiate the tournament, including four female umpires, the highest number yet for an ICC global event. The four female umpires were drawn from the ICC's International Umpires Development Panel and their male colleagues from the International Umpires Panel. Richie Richardson is a member of the Elite Match Referees Panel while Steve Bernard and David Jukes are on the Regional Match Referees Panel. Sue Redfern became the first woman to have played in a Women's Cricket World Cup and then stand in a tournament as an umpire.

Umpires

Umpire	Country
Gregory Brathwaite	West Indies
Chris Brown	New Zealand
Anil Chaudhary	India
Kathy Cross	New Zealand
Shaun George	South Africa
Adrian Holdstock	South Africa
Claire Polosak	Australia
Ahsan Raza	Pakistan
Sue Redfern	England
Langton Rusere	Zimbabwe
Sharfuddoula Saikat	Bangladesh
Jacqueline Williams	West Indies
Paul Wilson	Australia

Match Referees

Referee	Country
Steve Bernard	Australia
David Jukes	England
Richie Richardson	West Indies

== Prize money ==
The International Cricket Council declared a total prize money pool of US$2 million for the tournament, a tenfold increase from the 2013 World Cup. The prize money was allocated according to the performance of the team as follows:

Prize money
Stage	Teams	Prize money (USD)	Total (USD)
Winner	1	$660,000	$660,000
Runner-up	1	$330,000	$330,000
Losing semi-finalists	2	$165,000	$330,000
Winner of each pool match	28	$20,000	$560,000
Teams that do not pass the group stage	4	$30,000	$120,000
Total	$2,000,000		

== Group stage ==
On 8 February 2016, it was announced that in the Group Stage, eight sides will participate in a single-league format with each side playing the other once. This format was last used in the 2005 tournament. The top four sides following the conclusion of the league matches progressed to the semi-finals with the winners meeting at Lord's on 23 July. Therefore, a total of 31 matches were played during the 28-day tournament. The full fixtures for the tournament were announced by the ICC on 8 March 2017, to coincide with International Women's Day. Ahead of the group stage fixtures there were eight practice matches, played between 19 and 22 June 2017.

Teams tied on equal points in the group stage of the tournament were decided by number of wins, followed by net run rate. If both of those were still the same, then the head-to-head match between the two sides was used to determine who progresses to the semi-finals.

Pos	Team	Pld	W	L	T	NR	Pts	NRR
1	England (H, C)	7	6	1	0	0	12	1.295
2	Australia	7	6	1	0	0	12	1.004
3	India (R)	7	5	2	0	0	10	0.669
4	South Africa	7	4	2	0	1	9	1.183
5	New Zealand	7	3	3	0	1	7	0.309
6	West Indies	7	2	5	0	0	4	−1.522
7	Sri Lanka	7	1	6	0	0	2	−1.099
8	Pakistan	7	0	7	0	0	0	−1.930

(C) Champions; (H) Host; (R) Runners-up

=== Round 1 ===
24 June 2017
10:30
Scorecard

Sri Lanka; 188/9 (50 overs)	v	New Zealand; 189/1 (37.4 overs)
Chamari Athapaththu 53 (66); Holly Huddleston 5/34 (10 overs)		Suzie Bates 106* (109); Chandima Gunaratne 1/20 (5 overs)

New Zealand Women won by 9 wickets
Bristol County Ground, Bristol
Umpires: Anil Chaudhary (Ind) and Claire Polosak (Aus)
Player of the match: Holly Huddleston (NZ)

- New Zealand Women won the toss and elected to field.
- Points: New Zealand Women 2, Sri Lanka Women 0.

24 June 2017
10:30
Scorecard

India; 281/3 (50 overs)	v	England; 246 (47.3 overs)
Smriti Mandhana 90 (72); Heather Knight 2/41 (7 overs)		Fran Wilson 81 (75); Deepti Sharma 3/47 (8.3 overs)

India Women won by 35 runs
County Ground, Derby
Umpires: Ahsan Raza (Pak) and Gregory Brathwaite (WI)
Player of the match: Smriti Mandhana (Ind)

- England Women won the toss and elected to field.
- Mithali Raj (Ind) became the first woman to score seven successive half-centuries in WODIs.
- Points: India Women 2, England Women 0.

25 June 2017
10:30
Scorecard

Pakistan; 206/8 (50 overs)	v	South Africa; 207/7 (49 overs)
Nahida Khan 79 (101); Moseline Daniels 2/21 (10 overs)		Lizelle Lee 60 (79); Sadia Yousuf 2/30 (10 overs)

South Africa Women won by 3 wickets
Grace Road, Leicester
Umpires: Langton Rusere (Zim) and Sharfuddoula (Ban)
Player of the match: Shabnim Ismail (SA)

- South Africa Women won the toss and elected to field.
- Mignon du Preez became the first woman for South Africa to play in 100 WODIs.
- Points: South Africa Women 2, Pakistan Women 0.

26 June 2017
10:30
Scorecard

West Indies; 204 (47.5 overs)	v	Australia; 205/2 (38.1 overs)
Hayley Matthews 46 (63); Ellyse Perry 3/47 (9 overs)		Nicole Bolton 107* (116); Stafanie Taylor 2/33 (8.1 overs)

Australia Women won by 8 wickets
County Ground, Taunton
Umpires: Kathy Cross (NZ) and Adrian Holdstock (SA)
Player of the match: Nicole Bolton (Aus)

- West Indies Women won the toss and elected to bat.
- Felicia Walters (WI) made her WODI debut.
- Ashleigh Gardner became the first Indigenous Australian woman to play in a cricket World Cup.
- Points: Australia Women 2, West Indies Women 0.

=== Round 2 ===
27 June 2017
10:30
Scorecard

England; 377/7 (50 overs)	v	Pakistan; 107/3 (29.2 overs)
Nat Sciver 137 (92); Asmavia Iqbal 3/62 (10 overs)		Ayesha Zafar 56* (77); Katherine Brunt 2/21 (6 overs)

England Women won by 107 runs (DLS method)
Grace Road, Leicester
Umpires: Chris Brown (NZ) and Jacqueline Williams (WI)
Player of the match: Nat Sciver (Eng)

- Pakistan Women won the toss and elected to field.
- Rain during Pakistan Women's innings prevented any further play.
- Nat Sciver and Heather Knight (Eng) both scored their maiden centuries in a WODI.
- This was England Women's highest total in a World Cup match and their second-highest total in all WODIs.
- Points: England Women 2, Pakistan Women 0.

28 June 2017
10:30
Scorecard

South Africa	v	New Zealand

Match abandoned
County Ground, Derby
Umpires: Langton Rusere (Zim) and Paul Wilson (Aus)

- No toss.
- No play was possible due to rain.
- Points: New Zealand Women 1, South Africa Women 1.

29 June 2017
10:30
Scorecard

West Indies; 183/8 (50 overs)	v	India; 186/3 (42.3 overs)
Hayley Matthews 43 (57); Poonam Yadav 2/19 (10 overs)		Smriti Mandhana 106* (108); Shamilia Connell 1/23 (4 overs)

India Women won by 7 wickets
County Ground, Taunton
Umpires: Shaun George (SA) and Claire Polosak (Aus)
Player of the match: Smriti Mandhana (Ind)

- India Women won the toss and elected to field.
- Deandra Dottin and Stafanie Taylor (WI) both played in their 100th WODI.
- Points: India Women 2, West Indies Women 0.

29 June 2017
10:30
Scorecard

Sri Lanka; 257/9 (50 overs)	v	Australia; 262/2 (43.5 overs)
Chamari Athapaththu 178* (143); Nicole Bolton 2/18 (3 overs)		Meg Lanning 152* (135); Sripali Weerakkody 1/39 (8 overs)

Australia Women won by 8 wickets
Bristol County Ground, Bristol
Umpires: Anil Chaudhary (Ind) and Sue Redfern (Eng)
Player of the match: Chamari Athapaththu (SL)

- Australia Women won the toss and elected to field.
- Belinda Vakarewa (Aus) made her WODI debut.
- Chamari Athapaththu (SL) scored the third-highest total in a WODI and the second-highest total in a Women's World Cup match.
- Chamari Athapaththu also scored the highest percentage of runs in a completed innings in a WODI (69.26%) and the most runs in boundaries in a WODI (124).
- Points: Australia Women 2, Sri Lanka Women 0.

=== Round 3 ===
2 July 2017
10:30
Scorecard

Sri Lanka; 204/8 (50 overs)	v	England; 206/3 (30.2 overs)
Hasini Perera 46 (63); Laura Marsh 4/45 (10 overs)		Heather Knight 82 (76); Ama Kanchana 2/38 (6 overs)

England Women won by 7 wickets
County Ground, Taunton
Umpires: Kathy Cross (NZ) and Adrian Holdstock (SA)
Player of the match: Laura Marsh (Eng)

- Sri Lanka Women won the toss and elected to bat.
- Points: England Women 2, Sri Lanka Women 0.

2 July 2017
10:30
Scorecard

New Zealand; 219/9 (50 overs)	v	Australia; 220/5 (48.4 overs)
Katie Perkins 52 (59); Jess Jonassen 3/33 (10 overs)		Ellyse Perry 71 (91); Anna Peterson 2/27 (6.4 overs)

Australia Women won by 5 wickets
Bristol County Ground, Bristol
Umpires: Ahsan Raza (Pak) and Jacqueline Williams (WI)
Player of the match: Ellyse Perry (Aus)

- New Zealand Women won the toss and elected to bat.
- Suzie Bates (NZ) played her 100th WODI.
- Points: Australia Women 2, New Zealand Women 0.

2 July 2017
10:30
Scorecard

India; 169/9 (50 overs)	v	Pakistan; 74 (38.1 overs)
Poonam Raut 47 (72); Nashra Sandhu 4/26 (10 overs)		Sana Mir 29 (73); Ekta Bisht 5/18 (10 overs)

India Women won by 95 runs
County Ground, Derby
Umpires: Gregory Brathwaite (WI) and Shaun George (SA)
Player of the match: Ekta Bisht (Ind)

- India Women won the toss and elected to bat.
- Points: India Women 2, Pakistan Women 0.

2 July 2017
10:30
Scorecard

West Indies; 48 (25.2 overs)	v	South Africa; 51/0 (6.2 overs)
Chedean Nation 26 (53); Dane van Niekerk 4/0 (3.2 overs)		Lizelle Lee 29* (16)

South Africa Women won by 10 wickets
Grace Road, Leicester
Umpires: Sue Redfern (Eng) and Sharfuddoula (Ban)
Player of the match: Marizanne Kapp (SA)

- South Africa Women won the toss and elected to field.
- Reniece Boyce and Qiana Joseph (WI) both made their WODI debuts.
- This was the second-lowest total by the West Indies in a WODI.
- Dane van Niekerk (SA) became the first bowler in international cricket to take four wickets without conceding a run.
- Points: South Africa Women 2, West Indies Women 0.

=== Round 4 ===
5 July 2017
10:30
Scorecard

England; 373/5 (50 overs)	v	South Africa; 305/9 (50 overs)
Tammy Beaumont 148 (145); Marizanne Kapp 3/77 (10 overs)		Lizelle Lee 72 (77); Danielle Hazell 3/70 (10 overs)

England Women won by 68 runs
Bristol County Ground, Bristol
Umpires: Kathy Cross (NZ) and Paul Wilson (Aus)
Player of the match: Sarah Taylor (Eng)

- England Women won the toss and elected to bat.
- Tammy Beaumont and Sarah Taylor (Eng) made the highest partnership for any wicket in a Women's Cricket World Cup match (275).
- South Africa Women became the first side to make more than 300 runs batting second in a WODI.
- Points: England Women 2, South Africa Women 0.

5 July 2017
10:30
Scorecard

India; 232/8 (50 overs)	v	Sri Lanka; 216/7 (50 overs)
Deepti Sharma 78 (110); Sripali Weerakkody 3/28 (9 overs)		Dilani Manodara 61 (75); Poonam Yadav 2/23 (10 overs)

India Women won by 16 runs
County Ground, Derby
Umpires: Chris Brown (NZ) and Langton Rusere (Zim)
Player of the match: Deepti Sharma (Ind)

- India Women won the toss and elected to bat.
- Points: India Women 2, Sri Lanka Women 0.

5 July 2017
10:30
Scorecard

Australia; 290/8 (50 overs)	v	Pakistan; 131 (50 overs)
Ellyse Perry 66 (97); Sana Mir 3/49 (10 overs)		Sana Mir 45 (85); Kristen Beams 3/23 (9 overs)

Australia Women won by 159 runs
Grace Road, Leicester
Umpires: Anil Chaudhary (Ind) and Sue Redfern (Eng)
Player of the match: Elyse Villani (Aus)

- Australia Women won the toss and elected to bat.
- Rachael Haynes was the captain of Australia for the first time in a WODI.
- Sarah Aley (Aus) made her WODI debut.
- Points: Australia Women 2, Pakistan Women 0.

6 July 2017
10:30
Scorecard

West Indies; 150 (43 overs)	v	New Zealand; 151/2 (18.2 overs)
Kyshona Knight 41 (60); Leigh Kasperek 3/17 (10 overs)		Rachel Priest 90 (55); Anisa Mohammed 1/26 (3 overs)

New Zealand Women won by 8 wickets
County Ground, Taunton
Umpires: Ahsan Raza (Pak) and Adrian Holdstock (SA)
Player of the match: Leigh Kasperek (NZ)

- New Zealand Women won the toss and elected to field.
- Akeira Peters (WI) made her WODI debut.
- Points: New Zealand Women 2, West Indies Women 0.

=== Round 5 ===
8 July 2017
10:30
Scorecard

Pakistan; 144 (46.5 overs)	v	New Zealand; 147/2 (15 overs)
Sana Mir 50 (86); Hannah Rowe 3/22 (9 overs)		Sophie Devine 93 (41); Diana Baig 1/28 (4 overs)

New Zealand Women won by 8 wickets
County Ground, Taunton
Umpires: Gregory Brathwaite (WI) and Sharfuddoula (Ban)
Player of the match: Hannah Rowe (NZ)

- Pakistan Women won the toss and elected to bat.
- Sana Mir (Pak) played her 100th WODI and Lea Tahuhu (NZ) played her 50th WODI.
- Sophie Devine (NZ) hit nine sixes in her innings of 93, the most by a woman in a WODI.
- Points: New Zealand Women 2, Pakistan Women 0.
- Pakistan Women were eliminated as a result of this match.

8 July 2017
10:30
Scorecard

South Africa; 273/9 (50 overs)	v	India; 158 (46 overs)
Lizelle Lee 92 (65); Shikha Pandey 3/40 (9 overs)		Deepti Sharma 60 (111); Dane van Niekerk 4/22 (10 overs)

South Africa Women won by 115 runs
Grace Road, Leicester
Umpires: Jacqueline Williams (WI) and Paul Wilson (Aus)
Player of the match: Dane van Niekerk (SA)

- India Women won the toss and elected to field.
- Points: South Africa Women 2, India Women 0.
- Sri Lanka Women and West Indies Women were eliminated as a result of this match.

9 July 2017
10:30
Scorecard

England; 259/8 (50 overs)	v	Australia; 256/8 (50 overs)
Tammy Beaumont 49 (88); Elyse Villani 3/42 (5 overs)		Ellyse Perry 70 (86); Alex Hartley 2/31 (10 overs)

England Women won by 3 runs
Bristol County Ground, Bristol
Umpires: Chris Brown (NZ) and Adrian Holdstock (SA)
Player of the match: Katherine Brunt (Eng)

- England Women won the toss and elected to bat.
- Points: England Women 2, Australia Women 0.
- This was England Women's first win against Australia Women in a World Cup since 1993.

9 July 2017
10:30
Scorecard

West Indies; 229/9 (50 overs)	v	Sri Lanka; 182 (48 overs)
Merissa Aguilleira 46* (59); Sripali Weerakkody 3/38 (10 overs)		Shashikala Siriwardene 33 (67); Anisa Mohammed 3/39 (10 overs)

West Indies Women won by 47 runs
County Ground, Derby
Umpires: Shaun George (SA) and Claire Polosak (Aus)
Player of the match: Anisa Mohammed (WI)

- Sri Lanka Women won the toss and elected to field.
- Points: West Indies Women 2, Sri Lanka Women 0.

=== Round 6 ===
11 July 2017
10:30
Scorecard

West Indies; 285/4 (50 overs)	v	Pakistan; 117/3 (24 overs)
Deandra Dottin 104* (76); Asmavia Iqbal 2/76 (10 overs)		Javeria Khan 58* (72); Anisa Mohammed 2/21 (4 overs)

West Indies Women won by 19 runs (DLS method)
Grace Road, Leicester
Umpires: Sue Redfern (Eng) and Langton Rusere (Zim)
Player of the match: Deandra Dottin (WI)

- Pakistan Women won the toss and elected to field.
- Rain during Pakistan Women's innings set them a revised target of 137 runs from 24 overs.
- Deandra Dottin scored her first century in a WODI, and the fastest by a West Indies woman (71 balls).
- Points: West Indies Women 2, Pakistan Women 0.

12 July 2017
10:30
Scorecard

Sri Lanka; 101 (40.3 overs)	v	South Africa; 104/2 (23.1 overs)
Dilani Manodara 25 (49); Dane van Niekerk 4/24 (8 overs)		Laura Wolvaardt 48* (66); Inoka Ranaweera 1/20 (6 overs)

South Africa Women won by 8 wickets
County Ground, Taunton
Umpires: Gregory Brathwaite (WI) and Kathy Cross (NZ)
Player of the match: Dane van Niekerk (SA)

- Sri Lanka Women won the toss and elected to bat.
- Points: South Africa Women 2, Sri Lanka Women 0.

12 July 2017
10:30
Scorecard

India; 226/7 (50 overs)	v	Australia; 227/2 (45.1 overs)
Poonam Raut 106 (136); Ellyse Perry 2/37 (10 overs)		Meg Lanning 76 (88); Poonam Yadav 1/46 (8 overs)

Australia Women won by 8 wickets
Bristol County Ground, Bristol
Umpires: Adrian Holdstock (SA) and Sharfuddoula (Ban)
Player of the match: Meg Lanning (Aus)

- Australia Women won the toss and elected to field.
- Mithali Raj (Ind) became the leading run-scorer in WODIs, passing the previous record of 5,992 runs set by Charlotte Edwards (Eng), and became the first woman to pass 6,000 runs in WODIs.
- Points: Australia Women 2, India Women 0.
- Australia Women qualified for the semi-finals as a result of this match.

12 July 2017
10:30
Scorecard

England; 284/9 (50 overs)	v	New Zealand; 209 (46.4 overs)
Nat Sciver 129 (111); Amelia Kerr 4/51 (9 overs)		Suzie Bates 44 (68); Alex Hartley 3/44 (9.4 overs)

England Women won by 75 runs
County Ground, Derby
Umpires: Ahsan Raza (Pak) and Jacqueline Williams (WI)
Player of the match: Nat Sciver (Eng)

- England Women won the toss and elected to bat.
- Katherine Brunt (Eng) and Amy Satterthwaite (NZ) both played in their 100th WODI.
- Points: England Women 2, New Zealand Women 0.
- England Women and South Africa Women qualified for the semi-finals as a result of this match.

=== Round 7 ===
15 July 2017
10:30
Scorecard

Australia; 269 (48.3 overs)	v	South Africa; 210 (50 overs)
Nicole Bolton 79 (87); Suné Luus 5/67 (10 overs)		Laura Wolvaardt 71 (94); Rachael Haynes 2/12 (2 overs)

Australia Women won by 59 runs
County Ground, Taunton
Umpires: Chris Brown (NZ) and Langton Rusere (Zim)
Player of the match: Ellyse Perry (Aus)

- Australia Women won the toss and elected to bat.
- Points: Australia Women 2, South Africa Women 0.

15 July 2017
10:30
Scorecard

England; 220/7 (50 overs)	v	West Indies; 128/9 (50 overs)
Heather Knight 67 (88); Afy Fletcher 3/33 (10 overs)		Hayley Matthews 29 (64); Nat Sciver 3/3 (4 overs)

England Women won by 92 runs
Bristol County Ground, Bristol
Umpires: Anil Chaudhary (Ind) and Paul Wilson (Aus)
Player of the match: Heather Knight (Eng)

- West Indies Women won the toss and elected to field.
- Points: England Women 2, West Indies Women 0.

15 July 2017
10:30
Scorecard

India; 265/7 (50 overs)	v	New Zealand; 79 (25.3 overs)
Mithali Raj 109 (123); Leigh Kasperek 3/45 (10 overs)		Amy Satterthwaite 26 (47); Rajeshwari Gayakwad 5/15 (7.3 overs)

India Women won by 186 runs
County Ground, Derby
Umpires: Shaun George (SA) and Claire Polosak (Aus)
Player of the match: Mithali Raj (Ind)

- New Zealand Women won the toss and elected to field.
- This was India Women's biggest win, in terms of runs, in a Women's World Cup.
- Rajeshwari Gayakwad (Ind) recorded the best bowling figures for a bowler for India Women in Women's World Cups.
- This was the lowest all-out total made by New Zealand Women in Women's World Cups.
- Points: India Women 2, New Zealand Women 0.
- India Women qualified for the semi-finals as a result of this match.

15 July 2017
10:30
Scorecard

Sri Lanka; 221/7 (50 overs)	v	Pakistan; 206 (46.4 overs)
Dilani Manodara 84 (111); Diana Baig 3/41 (10 overs)		Nain Abidi 57 (68); Chandima Gunaratne 4/41 (10 overs)

Sri Lanka Women won by 15 runs
Grace Road, Leicester
Umpires: Kathy Cross (NZ) and Sue Redfern (Eng)
Player of the match: Chandima Gunaratne (SL)

- Sri Lanka Women won the toss and elected to bat.
- Shashikala Siriwardene (SL) played in her 100th WODI.
- Points: Sri Lanka Women 2, Pakistan Women 0.

== Knockout stage ==
Semi-finals
18 July – County Ground, Bristol
South Africa	218/6
England	221/8
20 July – County Ground, Derby
India	281/4
Australia	245

Final
23 July – Lord's, London
England	228/7
India	219

=== Semi-finals ===
Semi Final 1
18 July 2017
10:30
Scorecard

South Africa; 218/6 (50 overs)	v	England; 221/8 (49.4 overs)
Mignon du Preez 76* (95); Heather Knight 1/8 (2 overs)		Sarah Taylor 54 (76); Suné Luus 2/24 (5 overs)

England Women won by 2 wickets
Bristol County Ground, Bristol
Umpires: Gregory Brathwaite (WI) and Paul Wilson (Aus)
Player of the match: Sarah Taylor (Eng)

- South Africa Women won the toss and elected to bat.

Semi Final 2
20 July 2017
10:30
Scorecard

India; 281/4 (42 overs)	v	Australia; 245 (40.1 overs)
Harmanpreet Kaur 171* (115); Elyse Villani 1/19 (1 over)		Alex Blackwell 90 (56); Deepti Sharma 3/59 (7.1 overs)

India Women won by 36 runs
County Ground, Derby
Umpires: Ahsan Raza (Pak) and Shaun George (SA)
Player of the match: Harmanpreet Kaur (Ind)

- India Women won the toss and elected to bat.
- Rain reduced the match to 42 overs per side.
- Harmanpreet Kaur (Ind) made the highest score by a woman in the knockout stages of World Cups and the highest individual score for India in a Women's World Cup.

=== Final ===
It was announced on 8 February 2016 that Lord's would host the Final on 23 July 2017.

Final
23 July 2017
10:30
Scorecard

England; 228/7 (50 overs)	v	India; 219 (48.4 overs)
Nat Sciver 51 (68); Jhulan Goswami 3/23 (10 overs)		Poonam Raut 86 (115); Anya Shrubsole 6/46 (9.4 overs)

England Women won by 9 runs
Lord's, London
Umpires: Gregory Brathwaite (WI) and Shaun George (SA)
Player of the match: Anya Shrubsole (Eng)

- England Women won the toss and elected to bat.

== Statistics ==
=== Most runs ===
Player	Team	M	I	NO	Total	Avg	100s	50s	HS	S/R
Tammy Beaumont	England	9	9	0	410	45.56	1	1	148	76.92
Mithali Raj	India	9	9	0	409	45.44	1	3	109	70.15
Ellyse Perry	Australia	8	8	3	404	80.80	0	5	71	77.54
Sarah Taylor	England	9	9	1	396	49.50	1	2	147	99.00
Punam Raut	India	9	9	0	381	42.33	1	2	106	67.43
Source: ESPNcricinfo

=== Most wickets ===
Player	Team	M	I	Wkts	Avg	Econ	S/R	BBI	4W	5W
Dane van Niekerk	South Africa	7	7	15	10.00	3.46	17.3	4/0	3	0
Marizanne Kapp	South Africa	7	7	13	19.38	4.46	26.0	4/14	1	0
Kristen Beams	Australia	7	7	12	22.16	4.09	32.5	3/23	0	0
Anya Shrubsole	England	9	9	12	25.33	4.62	32.8	6/46	0	1
Deepti Sharma	India	9	9	12	30.83	4.70	39.3	3/47	0	0
Source: ESPNcricinfo

=== Team of the Tournament ===
The ICC announced its team of the tournament on 24 July.

- (England) Tammy Beaumont
- (South Africa) Laura Wolvaardt
- (India) Mithali Raj (c)
- (Australia) Ellyse Perry
- (England) Sarah Taylor (wk)
- (India) Harmanpreet Kaur
- (India) Deepti Sharma
- (South Africa) Marizanne Kapp
- (South Africa) Dane van Niekerk
- (England) Anya Shrubsole
- (England) Alex Hartley
- (England) Nat Sciver (12th)

== Broadcast ==
In May 2017, the ICC announced that 10 games would be shown live on television, while the remaining 21 matches would be streamed live via the ICC website. The 10 televised matches featured the Decision Review System (DRS) for the first time in women's cricket.
