= Ireland women's cricket team record by opponent =

The Ireland women's cricket team represents Ireland in international women's cricket. Cricket in Ireland is organised on an All-Ireland basis, meaning the Irish women's cricket team represents both Northern Ireland and the Republic of Ireland. The team is a full member of the International Cricket Council (ICC), being governed by Cricket Ireland.

The Irish women's team played their first-ever Women's One Day International (WODI) match on 28 June 1987, against Australia in a bilateral series. They participated in the Women's Cricket World Cup for the first time in the 1988 edition. Ireland got their first WODI win on 30 November 1988, beating the Netherlands by 86 runs. As of March 2024, they have played 173 WODIs against fourteen different opponents, resulting in 49 victories and 116 defeats for an overall winning percentage of 29.81. They have the fifth most defeats of any team in this format. They have played their highest number of matches against the Netherlands (25). They have been most successful against the same team, winning 23 WODI matches against them. They have also recorded the highest number of wins (4) against the Netherlands in the Women's Cricket World Cup. Ireland have lost 18 out of their 20 WODI matches against South Africa, the highest number of defeats for Ireland against any team in the format.

Ireland made their debut in Women's Test cricket on 30 July 2001 against Pakistan, winning the match by an innings and 54 runs. In April 2021 the Ireland women's cricket team was awarded permanent Test status by the ICC along with all full member women' teams, despite the match with Pakistan being Ireland's only Test match.

Ireland women's team competed in the short form of international cricket for the first time in 2008, when they played against the West Indies in a one-off Women's Twenty20 International (WT20I). They have played a total of 115 WT20I matches, recording 45 wins and 69 defeats for an overall winning percentage of 39.47. They have been the second most unsuccessful team in the format among the full member teams, both in terms of matches won as well as winning percentage. Ireland have met with Pakistan on the highest number of occasions in WT20Is, playing 19 times against them. They have recorded the highest number of wins (13) against the Netherlands in the format. Among the full member countries, they have defeated Zimbabwe most often (6 times). Pakistan is the team against whom Ireland have suffered the most defeats, losing 15 times against them. Ireland have taken part in four editions of the ICC Women's T20 World Cup, losing all of the 17 matches they played against nine different opponents, to become the most unsuccessful team in the championship.

== Key ==
- M – Denotes the number of matches played
- W – Denotes the number of wins for Ireland against the listed opponent
- L – Denotes the number of losses for Ireland against the listed opponent
- T – Denotes the number of ties between Ireland and the listed opponent
- D – Denotes the number of draws between Ireland and the listed opponent
- NR – Denotes the number of no results between Ireland and the listed opponent
- Tie+W – Number of matches tied and then won in a tiebreaker such as a bowl-out or Super Over
- Tie+L – Number of matches tied and then lost in a tiebreaker such as a bowl-out or Super Over
- Win% – Win percentage (in ODI and T20I cricket, a tie counts as half a win, and no results are disregarded)
- Loss% – Loss percentage
- Draw% – Draw percentage
- First – Year of the first match between Ireland and the listed opponent
- Last – Year of the latest match between Ireland and the listed opponent

== Test cricket ==
Ireland women's Test cricket record by opponent
Opponent	M	W	L	D	Win%	Loss%	Draw%	First	Last
Pakistan	1	1	0	0	100.00	0.00	0.00	2001	2001
Total	1	1	0	0	100.00	0.00	0.00	2001	2001

== One Day International ==
Ireland women's One Day International record by opponent
Opponent	M	W	L	T	NR	Win%	First	Last
Australia	17	0	17	0	0	0.00	1987	2023
Bangladesh	6	1	3	0	2	25.00	2011	2017
Denmark	7	6	1	0	0	85.71	1989	1999
England	17	1	16	0	0	5.88	1988	2010
India	12	0	12	0	0	0.00	1993	2017
Japan	1	1	0	0	0	100.00	2003	2003
Netherlands	25	23	2	0	0	92.00	1988	2022
New Zealand	20	0	18	0	2	0.00	1988	2018
Pakistan	21	6	15	0	0	28.57	1997	2022
Scotland	5	4	1	0	0	80.00	2001	2023
South Africa	20	1	18	0	1	5.26	1997	2022
Sri Lanka	4	0	3	0	1	0.00	2000	2017
West Indies	11	1	9	0	1	10.00	1993	2021
Zimbabwe	7	5	1	1	0	78.57	2021	2024
Total	173	49	116	1	7	29.81	1987	2024

== Twenty20 International ==
Ireland women's Twenty20 International record by opponent
Opponent	M	W	L	T	Tie+W	Tie+L	NR	Win%	First	Last
Australia	8	0	8	0	0	0	0	0.00	2014	2022
Bangladesh	11	3	8	0	0	0	0	27.27	2012	2022
England	2	0	2	0	0	0	0	0.00	2012	2023
France	1	1	0	0	0	0	0	100.00	2021	2021
Germany	1	1	0	0	0	0	0	100.00	2021	2021
India	2	0	2	0	0	0	0	0.00	2018	2023
Namibia	1	1	0	0	0	0	0	100.00	2019	2019
Netherlands	15	13	1	0	0	0	1	92.85	2009	2023
New Zealand	4	0	4	0	0	0	0	0.00	2014	2018
Pakistan	19	4	15	0	0	0	0	21.05	2009	2023
Papua New Guinea	2	2	0	0	0	0	0	100.00	2018	2019
Scotland	13	9	4	0	0	0	0	69.23	2018	2023
South Africa	13	2	11	0	0	0	0	15.38	2008	2022
Sri Lanka	3	0	3	0	0	0	0	0.00	2010	2016
Thailand	4	1	3	0	0	0	0	25.00	2018	2019
Uganda	1	1	0	0	0	0	0	100.00	2018	2018
United States	1	1	0	0	0	0	0	100.00	2022	2022
West Indies	8	0	8	0	0	0	0	0.00	2008	2023
Zimbabwe	6	6	0	0	0	0	0	100.00	2022	2024
Total	115	45	69	0	0	0	1	39.47	2008	2024
