= Susan Redhead =

West Indies cricketer (born 1962)

Personal information
- Full name: Susan Redhead
- Born: 15 June 1962 (age 64); Grenada
- Batting: Right-handed
- Role: Batter

International information
- National side: West Indies (2003)
- ODI debut (cap 45): 16 March 2003 v Sri Lanka
- Last ODI: 23 March 2003 v Sri Lanka

Domestic team information
- Years: Team
- 2001–2011: Grenada

Career statistics
Competition	WODI	WLA
Matches	3	21
Runs scored	8	294
Batting average	2.66	14.70
100s/50s	0/0	0/2
Top score	6	57
Catches/stumpings	0/–	4/–
- Source: CricketArchive, 8 June 2021

Susan Redhead (born 15 June 1962) is a Grenadian former cricketer who played as a right-handed batter. She appeared in 3 One Day Internationals for the West Indies in 2003. She played domestic cricket for Grenada.
