= 2017 Women's Cricket World Cup qualification =

The 2017 Women's Cricket World Cup in England was contested by eight teams. The top four teams in the 2014–16 ICC Women's Championship qualified automatically, while the other four places in the tournament were filled by the top four teams in the 2017 Women's World Cup Qualifier, a ten-team tournament.

== Automatic qualification ==
The top four teams in the eight-team 2014–16 ICC Women's Championship – Australia, England, New Zealand, and the West Indies – qualified automatically for the 2017 World Cup. The bottom four teams – India, South Africa, Pakistan, and Sri Lanka – qualified for the 2017 World Cup Qualifier.

== Regional qualification ==
=== Africa ===
The Africa regional qualifier was held in Harare, Zimbabwe, from 23–26 April 2016, and featured four teams. Twelve matches were played, all of 20-over duration (rather than the 50 overs used at the World Cup). Zimbabwe was the winner, finishing undefeated in its six matches.

(Q)	Qualified for World Cup Qualifier

Team	Pld	W	L	T	NR	Pts	NRR
Zimbabwe (Q)	6	6	0	0	0	12	+2.713
Kenya	6	3	3	0	0	6	–0.545
Uganda	6	2	4	0	0	4	+0.036
Tanzania	6	1	5	0	0	2	–1.836
Source: CricketArchive

List of matches

23 April
Scorecard

Kenya; 97/7 (20 overs)	v	Uganda; 84/6 (20 overs)

Kenya won by 13 runs
Alexandra Sports Club, Harare

23 April
Scorecard

Tanzania; 36/8 (20 overs)	v	Zimbabwe; 38/1 (8.5 overs)

Zimbabwe won by 9 wickets
Alexandra Sports Club, Harare

23 April
Scorecard

Kenya; 97/8 (20 overs)	v	Tanzania; 40/9 (20 overs)

Kenya won by 57 runs
Alexandra Sports Club, Harare

23 April
Scorecard

Uganda; 71/8 (20 overs)	v	Zimbabwe; 72/4 (12.4 overs)

Zimbabwe won by 6 wickets
Alexandra Sports Club, Harare

24 April
Scorecard

Zimbabwe; 147/8 (20 overs)	v	Kenya; 97/7 (20 overs)

Zimbabwe won by 50 runs
Alexandra Sports Club, Harare

24 April
Scorecard

Tanzania; 84/3 (20 overs)	v	Uganda; 80/9 (20 overs)

Tanzania won by 4 runs
Alexandra Sports Club, Harare

24 April
Scorecard

Tanzania; 67/8 (20 overs)	v	Zimbabwe; 68/1 (8.1 overs)

Zimbabwe won by 9 wickets
Alexandra Sports Club, Harare

24 April
Scorecard

Uganda; 114/4 (20 overs)	v	Kenya; 61 (19.3 overs)

Uganda won by 53 runs
Alexandra Sports Club, Harare

26 April
Scorecard

Zimbabwe; 141/6 (20 overs)	v	Kenya; 73 (19.5 overs)

Zimbabwe won by 68 runs
Alexandra Sports Club, Harare

26 April
Scorecard

Tanzania; 79/5 (20 overs)	v	Uganda; 80/2 (18.1 overs)

Uganda won by 8 wickets
Alexandra Sports Club, Harare

26 April
Scorecard

Tanzania; 70/7 (20 overs)	v	Kenya; 71/3 (12.1 overs)

Kenya won by 7 wickets
Alexandra Sports Club, Harare

26 April
Scorecard

Uganda; 94/6 (20 overs)	v	Zimbabwe; 95/4 (18.3 overs)

Zimbabwe won by 6 wickets
Alexandra Sports Club, Harare

=== Americas ===
In 2013, the ICC announced that no Americas regional qualifier would be held for the 2017 World Cup, citing the poor quality of women's cricket in the region both in terms of play and administration. Consequently, the West Indies (by virtue of their participation in the ICC Women's Championship) will be the only team from the ICC Americas development region to participate in the qualifying process for the World Cup.

=== Asia ===
The Asia regional qualifier was held in Hong Kong from 9–15 October 2016, with matches played at the Mission Road Ground, the Kowloon Cricket Club, and the Hong Kong Cricket Club. Four teams took part, and matches were of 20-over duration. Thailand qualified after winning five of their six matches.

(Q)	Qualified for World Cup Qualifier

Team	Pld	W	L	T	NR	Pts	NRR
Thailand (Q)	6	5	1	0	0	10	+0.923
Nepal	6	3	3	0	0	6	+0.215
Hong Kong	6	2	4	0	0	4	–0.067
China	6	2	4	0	0	4	–1.065

List of matches

9 October
9:30
Scorecard

Thailand; 106/6 (20 overs)	v	China; 32 (12.1 overs)

Thailand won by 74 runs
Mission Road Ground, Mong Kok

9 October
2:00
Scorecard

Nepal; 77 (20 overs)	v	Hong Kong; 78/4 (16.3 overs)

Hong Kong won by 6 wickets
Mission Road Ground, Mong Kok

10 October
9:30
Scorecard

Nepal; 76/8 (20 overs)	v	Thailand; 77/7 (18.4 overs)

Thailand won by 3 wickets
Mission Road Ground, Mong Kok

10 October
2:00
Scorecard

Hong Kong; 114/6 (20 overs)	v	China; 74 (18.5 overs)

Hong Kong won by 40 runs
Hong Kong Cricket Club, Wong Nai Chung

11 October
9:30
Scorecard

Nepal; 95/9 (20 overs)	v	China; 75/8 (20 overs)

Nepal won by 20 runs
Kowloon Cricket Club, Yau Ma Tei

11 October
2:00
Scorecard

Thailand; 90/6 (20 overs)	v	Hong Kong; 73/8 (20 overs)

Thailand won by 17 runs
Mission Road Ground, Mong Kok

13 October
9:30
Scorecard

Thailand; 86/7 (20 overs)	v	China; 87/7 (19.2 overs)

China won by 3 wickets
Kowloon Cricket Club, Yau Ma Tei

13 October
2:00
Scorecard

Nepal; 75/8 (20 overs)	v	Hong Kong; 69 (17.4 overs)

Nepal won by 6 runs
Kowloon Cricket Club, Yau Ma Tei

14 October
9:30
Scorecard

Nepal; 108/4 (20 overs)	v	Thailand; 109/9 (18.4 overs)

Thailand won by 1 wicket
Hong Kong Cricket Club, Wong Nai Chung

14 October
2:00
Scorecard

China; 114 (19 overs)	v	Hong Kong; 96/9 (20 overs)

China won by 18 runs
Hong Kong Cricket Club, Wong Nai Chung

15 October
9:30
Scorecard

China; 85/7 (20 overs)	v	Nepal; 88/6 (17.3 overs)

Nepal won by 4 wickets
Mission Road Ground, Mong Kok

15 October
2:00
Scorecard

Hong Kong; 83/7 (20 overs)	v	Thailand; 86/3 (18.5 overs)

Thailand won by 7 wickets
Mission Road Ground, Mong Kok

=== East Asia-Pacific ===
The East Asia-Pacific regional qualifier was held in Apia, Samoa, from 15–22 July 2016, and featured three teams. Papua New Guinea was the winner, finishing undefeated in its four matches.

(Q)	Qualified for World Cup Qualifier

Team	Pld	W	L	T	NR	Pts	NRR
Papua New Guinea (Q)	4	4	0	0	0	8	+1.176
Samoa	4	2	2	0	0	4	–0.189
Japan	4	0	4	0	0	0	–1.089
Source: CricHQ

List of matches

15 July
Scorecard

Samoa; 136 (50 overs)	v	PNG; 137/4 (34.5 overs)

PNG won by 6 wickets
Faleata Oval, Apia

16 July
Scorecard

Japan; 67 (43.1 overs)	v	PNG; 68/5 (24.4 overs)

PNG won by 5 wickets
Faleata Oval, Apia

18 July
Scorecard

Samoa; 207/8 (50 overs)	v	Japan; 181 (46.2 overs)

Samoa won by 26 runs
Faleata Oval, Apia

19 July
Scorecard

Samoa; 95 (39.3 overs)	v	PNG; 96/7 (38.1 overs)

PNG won by 3 wickets
Faleata Oval, Apia

21 July
Scorecard

Japan; 105/9 (50 overs)	v	PNG; 91/2 (25.1 overs)

PNG won by 8 wickets (D/L)
Faleata Oval, Apia

22 July
Scorecard

Japan; 135/8 (50 overs)	v	Samoa; 138/7 (43 overs)

Samoa won by 3 wickets
Faleata Oval, Apia

=== Europe ===
The Europe regional qualifier was held in Southend-on-Sea, Essex, England, from 12–15 July 2016. Only two teams participated, the Netherlands and Scotland, with Scotland winning all three matches.

(Q)	Qualified for World Cup Qualifier

Team	Pld	W	L	T	NR	Pts	NRR
Scotland (Q)	3	3	0	0	0	6	+0.578
Netherlands	3	0	3	0	0	0	–0.578
Source: CricketArchive

List of matches

12 July
Scorecard

Scotland; 218/5 (50 overs)	v	Netherlands; 133/7 (26 overs)

Scotland won by 27 runs (D/L)
Garon Park, Southend-on-Sea

13 July
Scorecard

Scotland; 222/9 (50 overs)	v	Netherlands; 169/6 (37 overs)

Scotland won by 8 runs (D/L)
Garon Park, Southend-on-Sea

15 July
Scorecard

Netherlands; 159 (45.2 overs)	v	Scotland; 160/2 (39.5 overs)

Scotland won by 8 wickets
Garon Park, Southend-on-Sea

== World Cup Qualifier ==
The 2017 World Cup Qualifier was played in Colombo, Sri Lanka, in February 2017.

Qualified teams

1. India (Bottom 4 of ICC Women's Championship)
2. South Africa (Bottom 4 of ICC Women's Championship)
3. Pakistan (Bottom 4 of ICC Women's Championship)
4. Sri Lanka (Bottom 4 of ICC Women's Championship)
5. Bangladesh (automatic qualification – ODI status)
6. Ireland (automatic qualification – ODI status)
7. Zimbabwe (Africa regional qualifier)
8. Thailand (Asia regional qualifier)
9. Papua New Guinea (East Asia-Pacific regional qualifier)
10. Scotland (Europe regional qualifier)
