= Joanne McKinley =

Northern Irish cricketer (born 1988)

Personal information
- Full name: Joanne McKinley
- Born: 1 August 1988 (age 38); Larne, Northern Ireland
- Batting: Right-handed
- Bowling: Right-arm medium
- Role: Bowler

International information
- National side: Ireland (2008)
- Only ODI (cap 58): 29 June 2008 v West Indies

Career statistics
Competition	WODI	WLA
Matches	1	4
Runs scored	3	19
Batting average	3.00	6.33
100s/50s	0/0	0/0
Top score	3	16
Balls bowled	12	66
Wickets	0	2
Bowling average	–	23.50
5 wickets in innings	0	0
10 wickets in match	0	0
Best bowling	–	2/17
Catches/stumpings	0/–	2/–
- Source: CricketArchive, 22 April 2022

Joanne McKinley (born 1 August 1988) is a Northern Irish former cricketer who played primarily as a right-arm medium bowler. She appeared in one One Day International for Ireland in 2008, against the West Indies.
