= Joan Alexander-Serrano =

Grenadian cricketer (born 1961)

Personal information
- Full name: Joan Alexander-Serrano
- Born: 1 February 1961 (age 65); Grenada
- Batting: Right-handed
- Bowling: Right-arm medium
- Role: All-rounder

International information
- National side: West Indies (1976)
- Only Test (cap 15): 21 November 1976 v India

Domestic team information
- Years: Team
- 1975/76: Grenada

Career statistics
Competition	WTest	WFC	WLA
Matches	1	3	2
Runs scored	4	46	29
Batting average	4.00	9.20	14.50
100s/50s	0/0	0/0	0/0
Top score	4	29	29
Balls bowled	6	78	–
Wickets	0	1	–
Bowling average	–	33.00	–
5 wickets in innings	0	0	–
10 wickets in match	0	0	–
Best bowling	–	1/20	–
Catches/stumpings	0/–	3/–	0/–
- Source: CricketArchive, 16 December 2021

Joan Alexander-Serrano (née Alexander; born 1 February 1961) is a Grenadian former cricketer who played as a right-handed batter and right-arm medium bowler. She appeared in one Test match for the West Indies in 1976. She played domestic cricket for Grenada. She went on to play two List A matches for the United States in 2011.

In 2020, Alexander-Serrano was appointed by USA Cricket as chair of its selection panel for the USA women's national team. She was reappointed to a second three-year term in 2023.
