= Nain Abidi =

Pakistani-American cricketer (born 1985)

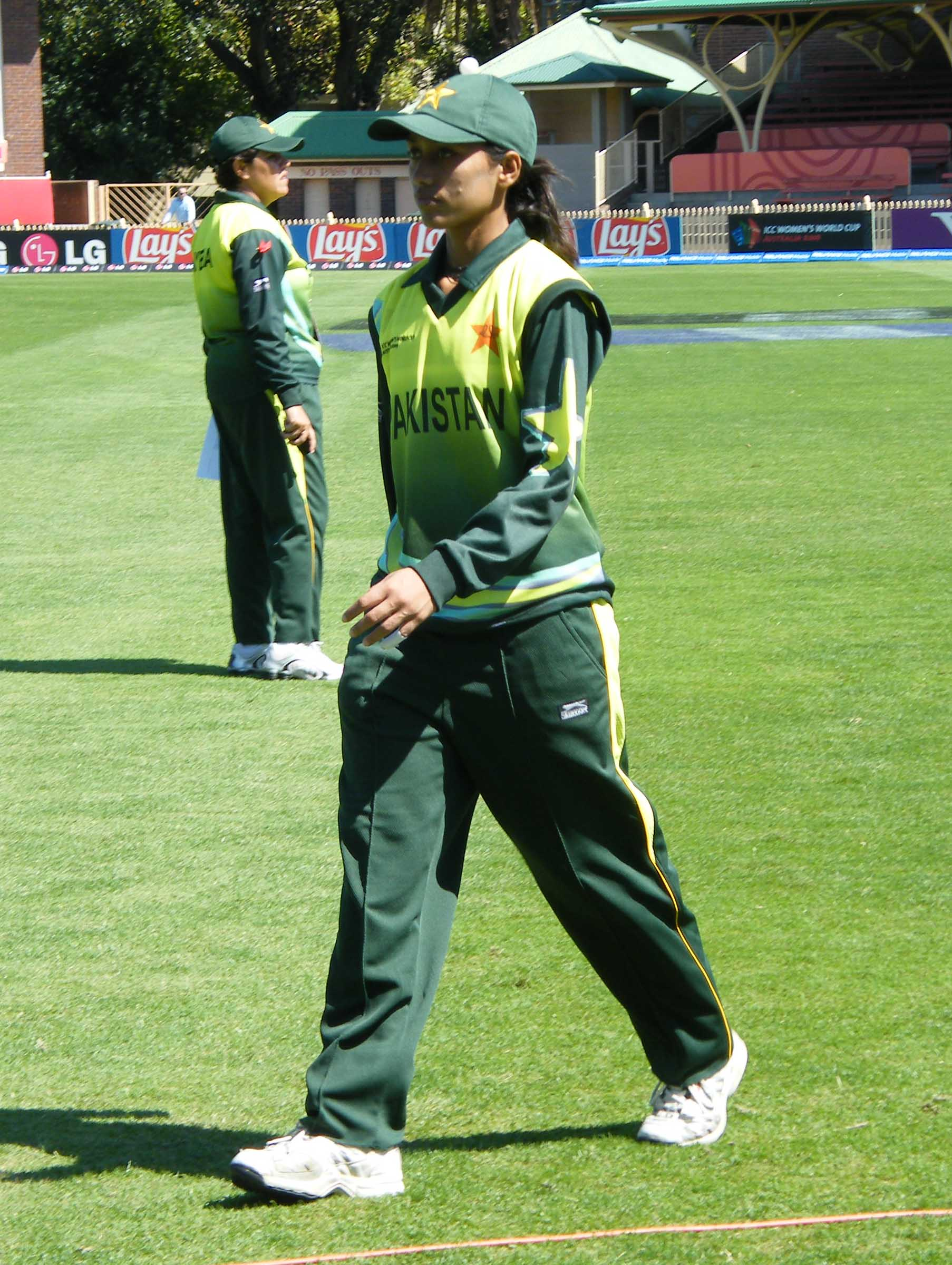
- Nain Abidi in 2009

Personal information
- Full name: Syeda Nain Fatima Abidi
- Born: 23 May 1985 (age 41); Karachi, Pakistan
- Height: 165 cm (5 ft 5 in)
- Batting: Right-handed
- Role: Batter

International information
- National side: Pakistan (2006–2018)
- ODI debut (cap 46): 19 December 2006 v India
- Last ODI: 15 July 2017 v Sri Lanka
- ODI shirt no.: 18
- T20I debut (cap 6): 25 May 2009 v Ireland
- Last T20I: 9 June 2018 v India

Domestic team information
- Years: Team
- 2005/06–2007/08: Karachi
- 2009/10–2012/13: Zarai Taraqiati Bank Limited
- 2014: Karachi
- 2015–2018: Zarai Taraqiati Bank Limited
- 2021–present: Philadelphia

Career statistics
Competition	WODI	WT20I	WLA	WT20
Matches	87	68	158	113
Runs scored	1,626	972	3,707	1,847
Batting average	20.84	18.00	30.63	21.22
100s/50s	1/9	0/3	6/20	0/6
Top score	101*	56	153*	85*
Balls bowled	–	24	12	24
Wickets	–	1	0	1
Bowling average	–	17.00	–	17.00
5 wickets in innings	–	0	0	0
10 wickets in match	–	0	0	0
Best bowling	–	1/7	–	1/17
Catches/stumpings	27/–	22/–	73/–	39/–
Medal record
Representing Pakistan
Women's Cricket
Asian Games
Gold medal – first place	2010 Guangzhou	Team
Gold medal – first place	2014 Incheon	Team
- Source: ESPNcricinfo, 5 January 2022

Syeda Nain Fatima Abidi (born 23 May 1985; Urdu: سیدہ نین فاطمہ عابدی) is a Pakistani-American cricketer who played as a right-handed batter internationally for Pakistan. She served as the vice-captain of the Pakistan women's cricket team. She appeared in 87 One Day Internationals and 68 Twenty20 Internationals for Pakistan between 2006 and 2018, and in 2012 became the first Pakistani player to score a century in WODIs, scoring 101* against Ireland. She was also part of the two Pakistan squads that won gold medals in women's cricket at the 2010 Asian Games and the 2014 Asian Games. She played domestic cricket for Karachi and Zarai Taraqiati Bank Limited.

== Background ==
During her childhood, Abidi trained at the Zaheer Abbas Cricket Academy in Karachi. She was coached by Sagheer Abbas, the younger brother of Zaheer Abbas.

== Pakistan career ==
=== 2006 ===
Nain made her international one-day debut on 19 December 2006 against India at Jaipur.

=== 2009 ===
She was part of the Pakistan squad at the Women's Cricket World Cup in Australia later that year.

=== 2010 ===
Nain was a member of the Pakistan team that won the gold medal in the inaugural women's cricket tournament at the 2010 Asian Games in Guangzhou, China, defeating Bangladesh in the final.

=== 2014 ===
Nain was again part of the Pakistan squad that retained the Asian Games gold medal in women's cricket at the 2014 Asian Games in Incheon, South Korea, defeating Bangladesh by four runs in the final under the Duckworth–Lewis method; she scored 18 runs in the final.

== United States career ==
In January 2017, Nain married Asad and moved to the United States. After playing in the 2017 Women's Cricket World Cup, she took a break from cricket, before returning to Pakistan to play in the Development T20 Women's Cricket Championship in 2018. After playing for Pakistan in the 2018 Women's Twenty20 Asia Cup, Abidi took a six-month break to visit her husband, who was working in the United States. In 2019, she and her husband had their first child, a son; they subsequently settled in the United States, and Nain retired from international cricket for Pakistan. After a two-year gap, she began playing club cricket in the United States, including for a team based in Philadelphia. In April 2021, she said that the Pakistan Cricket Board had granted her permission to represent the United States women's team if selected. She was sponsored by Nabeel Ahmed, a business figure and former vice-president of USA Cricket, for the USA National Women's Championship.
