= Steve Bernard (cricketer) =

Australian cricketer and referee

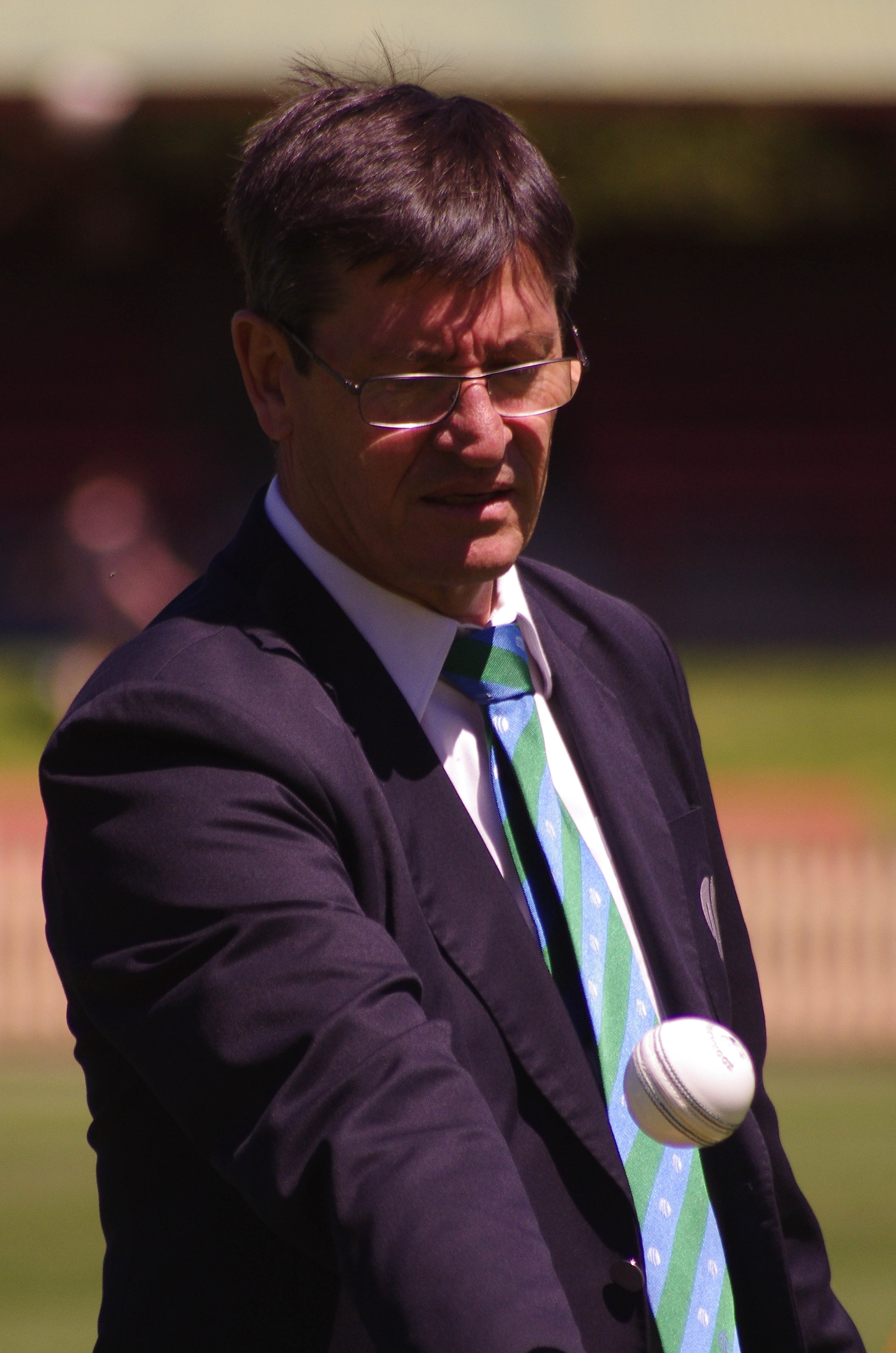
- Bernard in 2014

Personal information
- Full name: Stephen Russell Bernard
- Born: 28 December 1949 (age 76); Orange, New South Wales, Australia
- Batting: Right-handed
- Bowling: Right-arm fast-medium
- Role: Bowler

Domestic team information
- Years: Team
- 1970/71–1978/79: New South Wales
- First-class debut: 26 December 1970 New South Wales v Victoria
- Last First-class: 24 February 1979 New South Wales v Tasmania
- List A debut: 27 November 1971 New South Wales v Western Australia
- Last List A: 21 January 1978 New South Wales v Western Australia

Career statistics
Competition	FC	List A
Matches	29	8
Runs scored	122	11
Batting average	6.77	5.50
100s/50s	0/0	0/0
Top score	21	5
Balls bowled	5385	448
Wickets	85	5
Bowling average	33.32	51.60
5 wickets in innings	2	0
10 wickets in match	0	–
Best bowling	7/85	2/30
Catches/stumpings	4/–	6/–
- Source: ESPNcricinfo, 4 September 2017

Stephen Russell Bernard (born 28 December 1949) is an Australian cricketer and referee. He played his domestic matches for New South Wales between the 1970–71 and 1978–79 seasons.

Bernard is best known for holding several senior positions in New South Wales and Australian cricket. Through the 1980s and early 1990s, he served as a selector for NSW, even assuming chairmanship of the panel towards the end of his stint. He then graduated to a position on the national selection panel in 1993–94, operating in the post for four years. He was appointed Australian team manager for the Australian tour of India in 1997–98, through to the 2010–2011 season.

Bernard later served as a member of the ICC Associate and Affiliate Panel of Referee, representing Australia.

== See also ==
- List of New South Wales representative cricketers
