= Nicola Coffey =

Irish cricketer (born 1982)

Personal information
- Full name: Nicola Jane Coffey
- Born: 27 May 1982 (age 44); Dublin, Ireland
- Batting: Right-handed
- Bowling: Left-arm medium-fast
- Role: All-rounder

International information
- National side: Ireland (2003–2008)
- ODI debut (cap 47): 22 July 2003 v Japan
- Last ODI: 31 July 2008 v South Africa
- T20I debut (cap 3): 27 June 2008 v West Indies
- Last T20I: 1 August 2008 v South Africa

Career statistics
Competition	WODI	WT20I	WLA
Matches	19	2	28
Runs scored	180	31	310
Batting average	11.25	15.50	13.47
100s/50s	0/0	0/0	0/0
Top score	43	26	47
Balls bowled	207	24	219
Wickets	4	0	4
Bowling average	48.75	–	52.00
5 wickets in innings	0	0	0
10 wickets in match	0	0	0
Best bowling	1/23	–	1/23
Catches/stumpings	2/–	1/–	5/–
- Source: CricketArchive, 2 June 2021

Nicola Jane Coffey (born 27 May 1982) is an Irish former cricketer who played as a right-handed batter and left-arm medium-fast bowler. She played nineteen Women's One Day Internationals and two Twenty20 Internationals for Ireland between 2003 and 2008, including being part of Ireland's squad for the 2005 Women's Cricket World Cup.
