= Akeira Peters =

West Indian cricketer (born 1993)

Personal information
- Full name: Akeira Kay Peters
- Born: 30 September 1993 (age 33); Telescope, St. Andrew, Grenada
- Batting: Left-handed
- Bowling: Right-arm medium
- Role: Bowler

International information
- National side: West Indies (2017–2018)
- ODI debut (cap 86): 6 July 2017 v New Zealand
- Last ODI: 11 March 2018 v New Zealand
- ODI shirt no.: 56
- T20I debut (cap 35): 19 October 2017 v Sri Lanka
- Last T20I: 25 March 2018 v New Zealand

Domestic team information
- Years: Team
- 2010–2014: Grenada
- 2015: South Windward Islands
- 2016–2022: Windward Islands

Career statistics
Competition	WODI	WT20I
Matches	6	7
Runs scored	6	7
Batting average	1.20	7.00
100s/50s	0/0	0/0
Top score	4	4*
Balls bowled	84	54
Wickets	1	2
Bowling average	71.00	34.00
5 wickets in innings	0	0
10 wickets in match	0	0
Best bowling	1/20	1/7
Catches/stumpings	0/–	2/–
- Source: ESPNcricinfo, 20 May 2021

Akeira Kay Peters (born 30 September 1993) is a Grenadian cricketer who plays as a right-arm medium bowler. In May 2017, she was named in the West Indies squad for the 2017 Women's Cricket World Cup. She made her Women's One Day International (WODI) debut for the West Indies against New Zealand in the 2017 Women's Cricket World Cup on 6 July 2017. She made her Women's Twenty20 International (WT20I) debut for the West Indies against Sri Lanka on 19 October 2017.

In October 2018, Cricket West Indies (CWI) awarded her a women's contract for the 2018–19 season.
