= Jacqueline Pashley =

Dutch cricketer

Personal information
- Born: 25 May 1979 (age 47); Alphen aan den Rijn, Netherlands
- Batting: Right-handed
- Role: Wicket-keeper

International information
- National side: Netherlands (2006–2008)
- ODI debut (cap 70): 22 August 2006 v Ireland
- Last ODI: 9 July 2008 v West Indies
- Only T20I (cap 14): 6 July 2008 v West Indies

Career statistics
Competition	WODI	WT20I
Matches	10	1
Runs scored	56	3
Batting average	7.00	n/a
100s/50s	0/0	0/0
Top score	19*	3*
Catches/stumpings	5/5	0/0
- Source: CricketArchive, 19 November 2015

Jacqueline Pashley (born 25 May 1979) is a former Dutch international cricketer whose career for the Dutch national side spanned from 2006 to 2008.

A wicket-keeper from the VRA Amsterdam club, Pashley made her One Day International (ODI) debut for the Netherlands in August 2006, in a series against Ireland. Over the following two years, she and Violet Wattenberg were in constant competition for the wicket-keeping position in the team. On several occasions, both players were named in the same team, with one playing as a specialist batsman. Pashley's final appearances for the Netherlands came when the West Indies toured in July 2008. She played in three out of the four ODIs on tour, and in the second of two Twenty20 Internationals, which was her only appearance in that format.

== See also ==
- List of Netherlands women ODI cricketers
- List of Netherlands women Twenty20 International cricketers
