= David Jukes =

English cricket umpire

Personal information
- Full name: David Thomas Jukes
- Born: 24 May 1956 (age 70); Shoreham-by-Sea, Sussex
- Source: Cricinfo, 20 April 2016

David Thomas Jukes (born 24 May 1956 in Shoreham-by-Sea, Sussex) is a Match referee from England. He made his International debut when Ireland cricket team played against Kenya cricket team at Dublin in July 2009. He member of match referee chosen by the International Cricket Council as part of ICC Regional Referees to officiate associate and affiliate members rather than its full members.

== See also ==
- Elite Panel of ICC Referees
- List of One Day International cricket umpires
- List of Twenty20 International cricket umpires
