= Grenada women's national cricket team =

Grenada

Team information
- Founded: First recorded match: 1975
- Dissolved: 2016
- Home ground: Progress Park, Grenville

History
- First-class debut: Barbados in 1975 at Desmond Haynes Oval, Bridgetown
- S50 wins: 1
- T20 Blaze wins: 0

The Grenada women's national cricket team is the women's representative cricket team of the country of Grenada. They competed in the West Indies women's domestic cricket structure on and off between 1975 and 2014, after which they were replaced by the Windward Islands.

== History ==
Grenada joined the West Indies domestic structure for its inaugural season in 1975–76, playing in the Federation Championships losing all three of their matches. They competed in every season but one (1989) until 1991, and won their first title in 1990, winning the limited overs section of the tournament, beating Saint Lucia in the semi-final and Jamaica in the final.

After 1991, Grenada did not compete in the domestic structure until the 2000 season, after which they played in every season until 2014 but one (2005). Grenada were more successful earlier in this period, finishing 3rd in the league two seasons in a row in 2002 and 2003. In their final season competing in the Championship, 2014, they finished 6th after losing the 5th Place Play-Off to Saint Vincent and the Grenadines. In 2012 and 2013, Grenada also competed in the first two seasons of the Twenty20 Blaze, finishing 6th in 2012 and 5th in 2013.

After 2014 Grenada no longer competed in the domestic structure, with North Windward Islands and South Windward Islands competing in 2015 and a unified Windward Islands team, including Grenada, competing from 2016 onwards. The side did compete in three friendlies against Saint Vincent and the Grenadines in 2016, but the results are unrecorded.

== Players ==
=== Notable players ===
Players who played for Grenada and played internationally are listed below, in order of first international appearance (given in brackets):

- (Cricket West Indies) Joan Alexander-Serrano (1976)
- (Cricket West Indies) Debbie-Ann Lewis (2003)
- (Cricket West Indies) Susan Redhead (2003)
- (Cricket West Indies) Afy Fletcher (2008)
- (Cricket West Indies) Akeira Peters (2017)

== Honours ==
- Women's Super50 Cup:
  - Winners (1): 1990
- Twenty20 Blaze:
  - Winners (0):
  - Best finish: 5th (2013)

== See also ==
- Windward Islands women's cricket team
- Grenada national cricket team
