= Charlene Taitt =

West Indies cricketer (born 1984)

Personal information
- Full name: Charlene Olivia Taitt
- Born: 2 September 1984 (age 42); Barbados
- Batting: Right-handed
- Bowling: Right-arm off break
- Role: All-rounder

International information
- National side: West Indies (2008–2010)
- ODI debut (cap 62): 29 June 2008 v Ireland
- Last ODI: 20 April 2010 v Sri Lanka
- Only T20I (cap 15): 6 July 2008 v Netherlands

Domestic team information
- Years: Team
- 2004–2022: Barbados

Career statistics
Competition	WODI	WT20I
Matches	16	1
Runs scored	173	4
Batting average	13.30	4.00
100s/50s	0/0	0/0
Top score	47	4
Balls bowled	390	18
Wickets	6	2
Bowling average	37.00	3.50
5 wickets in innings	0	0
10 wickets in match	0	0
Best bowling	1/9	2/7
Catches/stumpings	3/–	1/–
- Source: ESPNCricinfo, 20 May 2021

Charlene Olivia Taitt (born 2 September 1984) is a Barbadian cricketer who plays as a right-arm off break bowler and right-handed batter. Between 2008 and 2010, she appeared in 16 One Day Internationals and 1 Twenty20 International for the West Indies. Taitt played in the 2009 Women's Cricket World Cup, and was a member of the West Indies squad at the 2009 ICC Women's World Twenty20. She played domestic cricket for Barbados.
