= Francis Maurice =

Saint Lucian cricketer (born 1969)

Personal information
- Born: 25 December 1969 (age 56); Saint Lucia
- Source: Cricinfo, 25 November 2020

Francis Maurice (born 25 December 1969) is a Saint Lucian cricketer. He played in six first-class and eight List A matches for the Windward Islands from 1984 to 1993.

== See also ==
- List of Windward Islands first-class cricketers
