= June Ogle =

West Indian cricketer (born 1986)

Personal information
- Full name: June Whitney Ogle-Thomas
- Born: 26 September 1986 (age 40); Georgetown, Guyana
- Batting: Right-handed
- Role: Wicket-keeper

International information
- National side: West Indies (2011–2013)
- ODI debut (cap 73): 13 January 2011 v India
- Last ODI: 3 November 2013 v England
- T20I debut (cap 30): 7 March 2013 v Sri Lanka
- Last T20I: 8 March 2013 v Sri Lanka

Domestic team information
- Years: Team
- 2005–2017: Guyana

Career statistics
Competition	WODI	WT20I	WLA	WT20
Matches	6	2	32	14
Runs scored	18	12	670	354
Batting average	3.60	6.00	24.81	39.33
100s/50s	0/0	0/0	1/3	0/2
Top score	9	6	104*	58*
Catches/stumpings	1/–	0/–	6/1	8/–
- Source: CricketArchive, 21 May 2021

June Whitney Ogle-Thomas (born 26 September 1986) is a Guyanese former cricketer who played as a right-handed batter and wicket-keeper. She appeared in 6 One Day Internationals and 2 Twenty20 Internationals for West Indies between 2011 and 2013. She played domestic cricket for Guyana.
