= Dominica women's national cricket team =

Cricket team

Dominica

Team information
- Founded: First recorded match: 1995
- Dissolved: 2014

History
- First-class debut: Saint Lucia in 1995
- S50 wins: 0
- T20 Blaze wins: 0

The Dominica women's national cricket team is the women's representative cricket team of the country of Dominica. They competed in the West Indies women's domestic cricket structure between 1995 and 2002 and between 2008 and 2014, after which they were replaced by the Windward Islands.

== History ==
Dominica joined the West Indies domestic structure in 1995, competing in the Federation Championships. The results of the tournament are not recorded. Dominica competed in the Federation Championships until 2002, and had their first recorded victory in 2001, beating Guyana by 143 runs. After the 2002 season, Dominica did not again compete in a domestic tournament until 2008.

After their return to competition, Dominica are only recorded winning one more match, a 1 wicket victory over Saint Lucia. Dominica also competed in the first two seasons of the Twenty20 Blaze in 2012 and 2013, finishing bottom of their group both times.

After 2014 Dominica no longer competed in the domestic structure, with North Windward Islands and South Windward Islands competing in 2015 and a unified Windward Islands team, including Dominica, competing from 2016 onwards.

== Players ==
=== Notable players ===
Players who played for Dominica and played internationally are listed below, in order of first international appearance (given in brackets):

- (Cricket West Indies) Doris Francis (2003)
- (Cricket West Indies) Pearl Etienne (2010)

== See also ==
- Windward Islands women's cricket team
- Dominica national cricket team
