= Gaitri Seetahal =

West Indies cricketer (born 1990)

Personal information
- Full name: Gaitri Seetahal
- Born: 23 October 1990 (age 36); Trinidad
- Batting: Right-handed
- Bowling: Right-arm off break
- Role: Bowler

International information
- National side: West Indies (2008)
- ODI debut (cap 65): 2 July 2008 v Netherlands
- Last ODI: 9 July 2008 v Netherlands
- Only T20I (cap 14): 6 July 2008 v Netherlands

Domestic team information
- Years: Team
- 2010–2014: Trinidad and Tobago

Career statistics
| Competition | WODI | WT20I | WLA | WT20 |
|---|---|---|---|---|
| Matches | 3 | 1 | 21 | 9 |
| Runs scored | 3 | – | 149 | 22 |
| Batting average | 3.00 | – | 11.46 | 11.00 |
| 100s/50s | 0/0 | – | 0/1 | 0/0 |
| Top score | 3 | – | 63 | 9* |
| Balls bowled | 90 | 18 | 734 | 150 |
| Wickets | 1 | 3 | 25 | 9 |
| Bowling average | 49.00 | 4.00 | 12.48 | 10.55 |
| 5 wickets in innings | 0 | 0 | 0 | 0 |
| 10 wickets in match | 0 | 0 | 0 | 0 |
| Best bowling | 1/31 | 3/12 | 3/1 | 4/7 |
| Catches/stumpings | 1/– | 0/– | 10/– | 3/– |
- Source: CricketArchive, 22 May 2021

Gaitri Seetahal (born 23 October 1990) is a Trinidadian former cricketer who played as a right-arm off break bowler. She appeared in 3 One Day Internationals and 1 Twenty20 International for the West Indies in 2008. She played domestic cricket for Trinidad and Tobago.

Seetahal made her only T20I appearance against the Netherlands, returning figures of 3/12 at the age of 17.
