= Pearl Etienne =

West Indian cricketer (born 1982)

Personal information
- Full name: Pearl Sharlin Etienne
- Born: 7 June 1982 (age 44); Goodwill, Roseau, Dominica
- Batting: Right-handed
- Bowling: Right-arm medium
- Role: Bowler

International information
- National side: West Indies (2010–2012)
- ODI debut (cap 72): 12 October 2010 v Pakistan
- Last ODI: 27 April 2012 v Sri Lanka
- Last T20I: 9 May 2012 v Sri Lanka

Domestic team information
- Years: Team
- 2000–2014: Dominica
- 2018–2023: Windward Islands

Career statistics
Competition	WODI	WT20I
Matches	8	13
Runs scored	14	28
Batting average	7.00	14.00
100s/50s	0/0	0/0
Top score	5*	11*
Balls bowled	240	132
Wickets	7	4
Bowling average	17.28	28.50
5 wickets in innings	0	0
10 wickets in match	0	0
Best bowling	3/16	2/9
Catches/stumpings	0/–	2/–
- Source: CricketArchive, 18 December 2024

Pearl Sharlin Etienne (born 7 June 1982) is a Dominican cricketer who played for Windward Islands and Dominica as a right-arm medium bowler. Between 2010 and 2012, she appeared in 8 One Day Internationals and 13 Twenty20 Internationals for the West Indies.

== Career ==
In September 2010, Pearl was named to the West Indies team for the ICC Women's Challenge, held in South Africa. She made her ODI debut against Pakistan on 12 October 2010 in the same tournament. She made her T20I debut against South Africa on 14 October 2014. Additionally, she played in some regional matches for Dominica in 2020.
