= Kirbyina Alexander =

West Indies cricketer (born 1987)

Personal information
- Full name: Kirbyina Nasie Alexander
- Born: 6 July 1987 (age 39); Trinidad
- Batting: Right-handed
- Bowling: Right-arm fast-medium
- Role: Bowler

International information
- National side: West Indies (2005–2010)
- ODI debut (cap 54): 7 April 2005 v South Africa
- Last ODI: 20 April 2010 v Sri Lanka
- T20I debut (cap 1): 27 June 2008 v Ireland
- Last T20I: 24 April 2010 v Sri Lanka

Domestic team information
- Years: Team
- 2008–present: Trinidad and Tobago

Career statistics
Competition	WODI	WT20I	WLA	WT20
Matches	20	6	46	24
Runs scored	70	15	233	64
Batting average	6.36	7.50	8.62	6.40
100s/50s	0/0	0/0	0/0	0/0
Top score	16	11	28	15
Balls bowled	582	78	1,554	417
Wickets	17	3	43	22
Bowling average	19.52	28.33	20.00	16.50
5 wickets in innings	0	0	1	0
10 wickets in match	0	0	0	0
Best bowling	3/6	3/20	5/38	4/18
Catches/stumpings	3/–	0/–	12/–	3/–
- Source: CricketArchive, 31 May 2021

Kirbyina Nasie Alexander (born 6 July 1987) is a Trinidadian cricketer who plays as a right-arm pace bowler. She appeared in 20 One Day Internationals and 6 Twenty20 Internationals for West Indies between 2005 and 2010. She plays domestic cricket for Trinidad and Tobago.
