= Debbie-Ann Lewis =

West Indies cricketer (born 1969)

Personal information
- Full name: Debbie-Ann Lewis
- Born: 7 August 1969 (age 57); Grenada
- Batting: Right-handed
- Bowling: Right-arm medium
- Role: All-rounder

International information
- National side: West Indies (2003–2009)
- ODI debut (cap 40): 13 March 2003 v Sri Lanka
- Last ODI: 19 March 2009 v India
- T20I debut (cap 5): 27 June 2008 v Ireland
- Last T20I: 14 June 2009 v Australia

Domestic team information
- Years: Team
- 1990–2014: Grenada

Career statistics
Competition	WODI	WT20I	WLA	WT20
Matches	42	5	70	17
Runs scored	279	16	661	176
Batting average	12.68	4.00	15.02	13.53
100s/50s	0/0	0/0	0/0	0/0
Top score	44*	7	47*	36*
Balls bowled	1,493	80	2,233	344
Wickets	29	3	47	11
Bowling average	29.55	27.66	29.51	26.27
5 wickets in innings	0	0	0	0
10 wickets in match	0	0	0	0
Best bowling	3/16	2/23	4/30	2/14
Catches/stumpings	12/–	0/–	24/–	5/–
- Source: CricketArchive, 1 June 2021

Debbie-Ann Lewis (born 7 August 1969) is a Grenadian former cricketer who played as an all-rounder, bowling right-arm medium and batting right-handed. She appeared in 42 One Day Internationals and 5 Twenty20 Internationals for the West Indies between 2003 and 2009. She played domestic cricket for Grenada.
