= Australia women's national cricket team record by opponent =

List of head-to-head records

The Australian women's national cricket team represents Australia in women's cricket tournaments. In the 50-over One Day International (ODI) format of the game, Australia have won more World Cups than all other teams combined—winning the 1978, 1982, 1988, 1997, 2005, 2013 and 2022 titles. They have also won multiple titles in the Twenty20 cricket format, as champions of the ICC Women's T20 World Cup in 2010, 2012, 2014, 2018, 2020 and 2023.

This list is a head-to-head record of the Australian team against the women's team of other cricket-playing nations. In the test cricket and ODI formats, Australia has a better head-to-head record than all other countries. in the Twenty20 format, they have a better record than all other nations, barring England (19-20 record in England's favour).

== Test cricket ==
Records complete to Women's Test #140. Last updated 13 July 2024.

Opponent	Matches	Won	Lost	Tied	Draw	First match	First win
England	50	13	9	0	30	28 December 1934	15 June 1937
India	10	4	0	0	6	15 January 1977	15 January 1977
New Zealand	13	4	1	0	8	20 March 1948	20 March 1948
West Indies	1	0	0	0	1	7 May 1976	

== One Day International ==
Records complete to WODI #1166. Last updated 13 July 2024.

Opponent	Matches	Won	Lost	Tied	N/R	First match	First win
ICC Full members
Bangladesh	1	1	0	0	0	25 March 2023	25 March 2023
England	84	47	23	1	3	28 July 1973	1 August 1976
India	50	40	10	0	0	8 January 1978	8 January 1978
Ireland	15	15	0	0	0	28 June 1987	28 June 1987
New Zealand	133	100	31	0	2	7 July 1973	7 July 1973
Pakistan	16	16	0	0	0	14 December 1997	14 December 1997
South Africa	15	14	0	1	0	12 December 1997	12 December 1997
Sri Lanka	11	11	0	0	0	1 December 2000	1 December 2000
West Indies	15	14	1	0	0	24 July 1993	24 July 1993
ICC Associate members
Denmark	2	2	0	0	0	28 July 1993	28 July 1993
International XI	4	3	0	0	1	21 July 1973	20 June 1982
Jamaica	1	1	0	0	0	11 July 1973	11 July 1973
Netherlands	5	5	0	0	0	29 November 1988	29 November 1988
Trinidad and Tobago	1	1	0	0	0	30 June 1973	30 June 1973
Young England	1	1	0	0	0	23 June 1973	23 June 1973

== Twenty20 International ==
Last updated 13 July 2024.

Opponent	Matches	Won	Lost	Tied	N/R	First match	First win
ICC Full members
Bangladesh	2	2	0	0	0	27 February 2020	27 February 2020
Barbados	1	1	0	0	0	31 July 2022	31 July 2022
England	42	19	20	2	1	2 September 2005	2 September 2005
India	31	23	6	0	1	28 October 2008	28 October 2008
Ireland	8	8	0	0	0	27 March 2014	27 March 2014
New Zealand	48	25	21	1	1	18 October 2006	19 July 2007
Pakistan	15	13	0	0	2	29 September 2012	29 September 2012
South Africa	7	7	0	0	0	7 May 2010	7 May 2010
Sri Lanka	7	7	0	0	0	27 September 2016	27 September 2016
West Indies	13	12	1	0	0	14 June 2009	14 June 2009

Note: Australia Women won a Super Over against England Women and won a Bowl-out against New Zealand Women. They lost a Super Over against England Women as well.
