= England women's cricket team record by opponent =

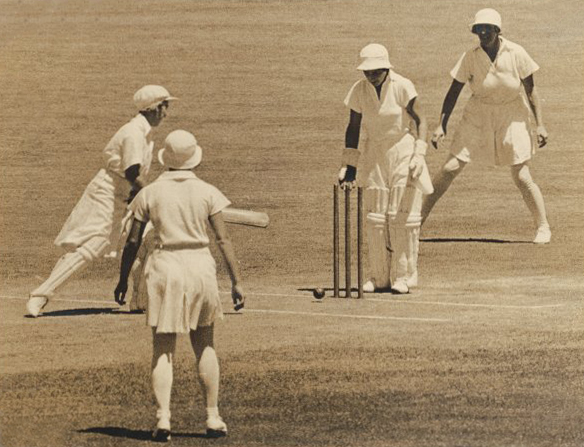
England playing against Australia in the second women's Test match at the Sydney Cricket Ground.

The England women's cricket team represents England in international women's cricket. They first competed in international cricket in 1934–35, when they played against Australia, contesting three Test matches. Their next officially recognised series was against New Zealand in 1971–72. They received their first Test defeat when they lost to Australia in 1937, and their first Test series lost was in 1949, when the team lost the women's Ashes to Australia with one loss and two draws. The team played its first One Day International (ODI) match against the International XI in the 1973 Women's Cricket World Cup; England won the match by 135 runs. The team won the 1973, 1993, 2009 and 2017 editions of the women's Cricket World Cup. England have played 91 Test matches, 398 ODI matches and 208 Twenty20 Internationals since their first such contest in 2004.

England have only played five different sides in Test cricket, with their most frequent opponent being Australia, against whom England have contested 52 Tests. The only sides that have beaten England in Test cricket are Australia and India. England have similarly faced Australia more times than any other team in ODI cricket, playing 83 matches; and Australia have recorded the most victories against England, beating them 55 times. England have beaten New Zealand more times than any other country, triumphing on 46 occasions against them. In Twenty20 Internationals, England have played more matches against Australia and New Zealand than any other countries, facing them 42 and 40 times respectively. They have recorded the most victories against New Zealand, beating them in 32 matches.

== Key ==
Symbol	Meaning
M	Number of matches played
W	Number of matches won
L	Number of matches lost
T	Number of matches tied
D	Number of matches ended in a draw
NR	Number of matches ended with no result
Tie+W	Number of matches tied and then won in a tiebreaker such as a bowl-out or Super Over
Tie+L	Number of matches tied and then lost in a tiebreaker such as a bowl-out or Super Over
Win%	Percentage of games won to those played (Note: Games that did not have a result are not included in calculating the result percentage, and ties are counted as half a win.)
Loss%	Percentage of games lost to those played
Draw%	Percentage of games drawn to those played
First	Year of the first match played by England against the country
Last	Year of the last match played by England against the country

== Test cricket ==
England women Test cricket record by opponent
Opponent	M	W	L	T	D	Win%	Loss%	Draw%	First	Last
Australia	53	9	14	0	30	16.98	26.41	56.60	1934	2025
India	15	1	3	0	11	6.66	20.00	73.33	1986	2023
New Zealand	23	6	0	0	17	26.08	0.00	73.91	1935	2004
South Africa	8	3	0	0	5	37.50	0.00	62.50	1960	2024
West Indies	3	2	0	0	1	66.66	0.00	33.33	1979	1979
Overall Total	102	21	17	0	64	20.58	16.66	62.74	1934	2025

== One Day International ==
England women One Day International record by opponent
Opponent	M	W	L	T	NR	Win%	First	Last
Australia	90	24	62	1	3	27.58	1973	2025
Bangladesh	2	2	0	0	0	100.00	2022	2025
Denmark	8	8	0	0	0	100.00	1989	1999
India	80	42	36	0	2	53.84	1998	2025
International XI	4	4	0	0	0	100.00	1973	1982
Ireland	20	18	2	0	0	90.00	1988	2024
Jamaica	1	1	0	0	0	100.00	1973	1973
Netherlands	10	10	0	0	0	100.00	1988	2001
New Zealand	86	47	37	1	1	55.29	1973	2025
Pakistan	16	13	0	0	3	86.66	1997	2025
Scotland	1	1	0	0	0	100.00	2001	2001
South Africa	48	36	11	0	1	76.59	1997	2025
Sri Lanka	21	18	1	0	2	94.73	1997	2025
Trinidad and Tobago	1	1	0	0	0	100.00	1973	1973
West Indies	29	21	6	0	2	77.77	1979	2025
Young England	1	1	0	0	0	100.00	1973	1973
Overall Total	418	247	155	2	14	61.13	1973	2025

== Twenty20 International ==
England women Twenty20 International record by opponent
Opponent	M	W	L	T	Tie+W	Tie+L	NR	Win%	First	Last
Australia	45	20	22	0	1	1	1	45.45	2005	2025
Bangladesh	4	4	0	0	0	0	0	100.00	2014	2024
India	35	24	11	0	0	0	0	68.57	2006	2025
Ireland	4	3	1	0	0	0	0	75.00	2012	2024
New Zealand	40	32	8	0	0	0	0	80.00	2004	2024
Pakistan	18	17	1	0	0	0	0	94.44	2009	2024
Scotland	1	1	0	0	0	0	0	100.00	2024	2024
South Africa	28	23	4	0	0	0	1	82.14	2007	2024
Sri Lanka	12	10	2	0	0	0	0	83.33	2009	2023
Thailand	1	1	0	0	0	0	0	100.00	2020	2020
West Indies	32	22	9	0	0	1	0	68.75	2009	2025
Overall Total	220	157	58	0	1	2	2	72.01	2004	2025
