= Lynne Read =

English cricketer (born 1948)

Personal information
- Full name: Lynne Read
- Born: 1948 (age 77–78); Hertfordshire, England
- Batting: Left-handed
- Role: Wicket-keeper

International information
- National sides: Young England (1973); England (1976)
- ODI debut (cap 10/19): 23 June 1973; Young England v Australia
- Last ODI: 1 August 1976; England v Australia

Domestic team information
- Years: Team
- 1972–1978: East Anglia

Career statistics
Competition	WODI	WFC	WLA
Matches	7	5	9
Runs scored	10	33	10
Batting average	5.00	33.00	3.33
100s/50s	0/0	0/0	0/0
Top score	5	14*	5
Catches/stumpings	4/3	4/6	4/3
- Source: CricketArchive, 13 March 2021

Lynne Read (born 1948) is an English former cricketer who played as a wicket-keeper and left-handed batter. She played for Young England in the 1973 Women's Cricket World Cup and later played one One Day International for the full England side against Australia in 1976. She took four catches, made three stumpings and scored 10 runs in her seven One Day Internationals. She played domestic cricket for East Anglia.
