= Tina Macpherson =

Australian cricketer (born 1949)

Personal information
- Full name: Tina Macpherson
- Born: 20 August 1949 (age 77); Strathfield, Sydney, Australia
- Batting: Left-handed
- Bowling: Right-arm fast
- Role: Bowler

International information
- National side: Australia (1972–1973)
- Only Test (cap 76): 5 February 1972 v New Zealand
- ODI debut (cap 6): 23 June 1973 v Young England
- Last ODI: 28 July 1973 v England

Domestic team information
- Years: Team
- 1967/68–1978/79: New South Wales

Career statistics
Competition	WTest	WODI	WFC	WLA
Matches	1	5	22	13
Runs scored	3	14	314	62
Batting average	1.50	14.00	14.95	12.40
100s/50s	0/0	0/0	0/0	0/0
Top score	3	14	44	29
Balls bowled	248	253	2,979	694
Wickets	6	9	56	23
Bowling average	16.66	11.00	12.14	10.90
5 wickets in innings	0	1	2	1
10 wickets in match	0	0	1	0
Best bowling	3/26	5/14	6/15	5/14
Catches/stumpings	1/–	0/–	5/–	0/–
- Source: CricketArchive, 13 November 2023

Tina Macpherson (born 20 August 1949) is an Australian former cricketer who played as a right-arm pace bowler. She appeared in one Test match and five One Day Internationals for Australia in 1972 and 1973. She played domestic cricket for New South Wales.

She took 5/14 on her One Day International debut, in the 1973 Women's Cricket World Cup against Young England, becoming the first woman to take a five-wicket haul in a One Day International.
