= Margaret Wilks =

English cricketer (born 1950)

Personal information
- Full name: Margaret Ann Wilks
- Born: 6 November 1950 (age 76); Southampton, Hampshire, England
- Batting: Left-handed
- Bowling: Right-arm medium
- Role: All-rounder

International information
- National sides: Young England (1973); England (1978)
- ODI debut (cap 11/24): 23 June 1973; Young England v Australia
- Last ODI: 13 January 1978; England v Australia

Domestic team information
- Years: Team
- 1971–1982: West

Career statistics
Competition	WODI	WFC	WLA
Matches	9	6	15
Runs scored	51	22	142
Batting average	7.28	3.66	10.92
100s/50s	0/0	0/0	0/0
Top score	17	22	45
Balls bowled	360	326	672
Wickets	4	6	9
Bowling average	41.00	54.33	36.77
5 wickets in innings	0	0	0
10 wickets in match	–	0	–
Best bowling	2/6	3/36	2/6
Catches/stumpings	0/–	1/–	0/–
- Source: CricketArchive, 13 March 2021

Margaret Ann Wilks (born 6 November 1950) is an English former cricketer who played as an all-rounder. She was a left-handed batter and right-arm medium bowler. She played for Young England in the 1973 Women's Cricket World Cup and the full England side in the 1978 Women's Cricket World Cup. She scored 51 runs and took four wickets in her nine One Day Internationals. Her best bowling performance came against India in 1978, when she claimed two wickets and conceded just six runs. She played domestic cricket for West of England.
