= Katherine Brown (cricketer) =

English cricketer (born 1953)

Personal information
- Full name: Katherine Mary Brown
- Born: 24 January 1953 (age 73); Essex, England
- Bowling: Right-arm off break
- Role: All-rounder

International information
- National sides: Young England (1973); England (1976–1979)
- Only Test (cap 86): 1 July 1979; England v West Indies
- ODI debut (cap 1/15): 23 June 1973; Young England v Australia
- Last ODI: 7 July 1979; England v West Indies

Domestic team information
- Years: Team
- 1966–1998: Kent

Career statistics
| Competition | WTest | WODI | WFC | WLA |
|---|---|---|---|---|
| Matches | 1 | 5 | 6 | 84 |
| Runs scored | 16 | 22 | 102 | 1,441 |
| Batting average | 16.00 | 11.00 | 14.57 | 21.50 |
| 100s/50s | 0/0 | 0/0 | 0/1 | 0/8 |
| Top score | 16 | 15* | 60 | 82 |
| Balls bowled | 138 | 198 | 924 | 4,519 |
| Wickets | 2 | 2 | 12 | 84 |
| Bowling average | 28.00 | 57.00 | 37.83 | 23.51 |
| 5 wickets in innings | 0 | 0 | 0 | 0 |
| 10 wickets in match | 0 | 0 | 0 | 0 |
| Best bowling | 2/35 | 2/29 | 3/60 | 4/8 |
| Catches/stumpings | 0/– | 0/– | 1/– | 18/– |
- Source: CricketArchive, 27 February 2021

Katherine Mary Brown (born 24 January 1953) is an English former cricketer who played as a right-arm off break bowling all-rounder. She appeared in one Test match and two One Day Internationals for England between 1976 and 1979, as well as playing 3 matches for Young England at the 1973 World Cup. She played domestic cricket for Kent.
