= Julia Lloyd (cricketer) =

English cricketer (born 1950)

Personal information
- Full name: Julia Lloyd
- Born: 1950 (age 75–76); London, England
- Role: Batter

International information
- National side: Young England (1973)
- ODI debut (cap 14): 7 July 1973 v International XI
- Last ODI: 14 July 1973 v Trinidad and Tobago

Domestic team information
- Years: Team
- 1972–1977: East Anglia

Career statistics
| Competition | WODI | WFC | WLA |
|---|---|---|---|
| Matches | 2 | 1 | 4 |
| Runs scored | 14 | 48 | 18 |
| Batting average | 7.00 | 24.00 | 4.50 |
| 100s/50s | 0/0 | 0/0 | 0/0 |
| Top score | 9 | 41 | 9 |
| Balls bowled | – | – | 24 |
| Wickets | – | – | 0 |
| Bowling average | – | – | – |
| 5 wickets in innings | – | – | 0 |
| 10 wickets in match | – | – | – |
| Best bowling | – | – | – |
| Catches/stumpings | 0/– | 0/– | 2/– |
- Source: CricketArchive, 14 March 2021

Julia Lloyd (born 1950) is an English former cricketer who played as a batter. She appeared in two One Day Internationals for Young England at the 1973 World Cup. She scored 14 runs in the tournament at an average of 7.00. She played domestic cricket for East Anglia.
