= Lynne Green =

English cricketer

Personal information
- Full name: Lynne Green
- Born: 2 April 1953 (age 73); Mansfield, Nottinghamshire, England
- Batting: Right-handed
- Bowling: Right-arm medium
- Role: All-rounder

International information
- National side: Young England (1973)
- ODI debut (cap 12): 23 June 1973 v Australia
- Last ODI: 21 July 1973 v New Zealand

Domestic team information
- Years: Team
- 1976: East Midlands

Career statistics
Competition	WODI	WFC
Matches	5	2
Runs scored	20	15
Batting average	10.00	7.50
100s/50s	0/0	0/0
Top score	14*	15
Balls bowled	20	6
Wickets	0	1
Bowling average	–	4.00
5 wickets in innings	0	0
10 wickets in match	–	0
Best bowling	–	1/4
Catches/stumpings	0/–	4/–
- Source: CricketArchive, 14 March 2021

Lynne Green (born 2 April 1953) is an English former cricketer who played as a right-handed batter and right-arm medium bowler. She appeared in five One Day Internationals for Young England at the 1973 World Cup. She played domestic cricket for East Midlands.
