= Shirley Ellis (cricketer) =

Welsh former cricketer (born 1952)

Personal information
- Full name: Shirley Ellis
- Born: 1952 (age 73–74)
- Role: All-rounder

International information
- National side: Young England (1973)
- ODI debut (cap 3): 23 June 1973 v Australia
- Last ODI: 18 July 1973 v England

Domestic team information
- Years: Team
- 1972–1973: Sussex
- 1974: West

Career statistics
Competition	WODI	WFC	WLA
Matches	5	1	8
Runs scored	62	19	105
Batting average	12.40	9.50	13.12
100s/50s	0/0	0/0	0/0
Top score	30	19	30
Balls bowled	288	132	444
Wickets	2	1	5
Bowling average	51.50	59.00	39.60
5 wickets in innings	0	0	0
10 wickets in match	–	0	–
Best bowling	1/6	1/13	2/36
Catches/stumpings	1/–	0/–	1/–
- Source: CricketArchive, 14 March 2021

Shirley Ellis (born 1952; married name Morgan) is a Welsh former sportswoman who played cricket as an all-rounder and field hockey for the Welsh national team.

She appeared in five One Day Internationals (ODIs) for Young England in the 1973 Women's Cricket World Cup. In her first match, she became the first woman cricketer to open both the batting and bowling in an ODI. Overall, she took two wickets and scored 62 runs, with a high score of 30. She played domestic cricket for Sussex and West of England.

Ellis her first appearance for the Welsh hockey team in 1971, aged nineteen. In 1973 she took part in the Welsh Ladies' tour of the West Indies, from which she emerged top scorer with 17 goals.
