= Gloria Farrell =

Trinidadian cricketer (born 1954)

Personal information
- Full name: Gloria Farrell
- Born: 1954 (age 71–72); Port of Spain, Trinidad
- Role: Bowler

International information
- National side: International XI (1973)
- ODI debut (cap 4): 23 June 1973 v England
- Last ODI: 18 July 1973 v Trinidad and Tobago

Domestic team information
- Years: Team
- 1975/76: Trinidad and Tobago

Career statistics
Competition	WODI	WFC
Matches	5	2
Runs scored	9	0
Batting average	–	0.00
100s/50s	0/0	0/0
Top score	8*	0
Balls bowled	255	126
Wickets	6	3
Bowling average	20.33	9.66
5 wickets in innings	0	0
10 wickets in match	0	0
Best bowling	2/18	2/14
Catches/stumpings	0/–	0/–
- Source: CricketArchive, 27 October 2021

Gloria Farrell (born 1954) is a Trinidadian former cricketer who played primarily as a bowler. She played 5 One Day Internationals for International XI at the 1973 Women's Cricket World Cup, taking 6 wickets at an average of 20.33. She played domestic cricket for Trinidad and Tobago.
