= Susan Goatman =

English cricketer (born 1945)

Personal information
- Full name: Susan Goatman
- Born: 5 February 1945 (age 81); Thanet, Kent, England
- Batting: Right-handed
- Role: Batter

International information
- National sides: Young England (1973); England (1979–1982)
- Test debut (cap 83): 16 June 1979; England v West Indies
- Last Test: 1 July 1979; England v West Indies
- ODI debut (cap 4/26): 23 June 1973; Young England v Australia
- Last ODI: 7 February 1982; England v Australia

Domestic team information
- Years: Team
- 1968–1983: Kent

Career statistics
Competition	WTest	WODI	WFC	WLA
Matches	3	21	14	33
Runs scored	158	498	617	750
Batting average	31.60	26.21	26.82	24.19
100s/50s	0/1	0/3	0/4	0/3
Top score	71	83	98	83
Catches/stumpings	3/–	6/–	9/–	10/–
- Source: CricketArchive, 27 February 2021

Susan Goatman (born 5 February 1945) is an English former cricketer who played as a right-handed batter. She appeared in 3 Test matches and 15 One Day Internationals for England between 1979 and 1982. She was captain of England for their 1979 series against West Indies and for the 1982 World Cup. Her final WODI appearance was in the final of the 1982 Women's Cricket World Cup.

She also captained Young England at the 1973 World Cup, playing all of their 6 matches in the tournament. She played domestic cricket for Kent.
