= Jacqueline Court =

English cricketer (born 1950)

Jackie Court
Personal information
- Full name: Jacqueline Margaret Court
- Born: 22 January 1950 (age 76); Willesden, Middlesex, England
- Batting: Right-handed
- Bowling: Right-arm leg break
- Role: All-rounder

International information
- National sides: Young England (1973); England (1976–1987)
- Test debut (cap 81): 24 July 1976; England v Australia
- Last Test: 29 August 1987; England v Australia
- ODI debut (cap 2/16): 23 June 1973; Young England v Australia
- Last ODI: 25 July 1987; England v Australia

Domestic team information
- Years: Team
- 1965–1990: Middlesex

Career statistics
Competition	WTest	WODI	WFC	WLA
Matches	17	27	31	68
Runs scored	577	397	1,128	995
Batting average	20.60	23.35	24.52	19.90
100s/50s	0/1	0/1	1/3	0/4
Top score	90	67	105*	72
Balls bowled	1,007	724	2,453	1,954
Wickets	8	16	30	50
Bowling average	61.25	22.37	36.06	17.48
5 wickets in innings	0	0	0	0
10 wickets in match	0	0	0	0
Best bowling	2/31	4/29	4/30	4/17
Catches/stumpings	11/–	11/–	18/–	20/–
- Source: CricketArchive, 28 February 2021

Jacqueline Margaret "Jackie" Court (born 22 January 1950) is an English former cricketer who played as a right-handed batter and right-arm leg break bowler. She appeared in 17 Test matches and 23 One Day Internationals for England between 1976 and 1987. She also played 4 matches for Young England at the 1973 World Cup. She played domestic cricket for Middlesex.

Born in Willesden, Middlesex, she made her One Day International debut in the inaugural Women's World Cup in 1973 for Young England against Australia. She made her Test match debut against the same opposition at the Oval in 1976 and played her last test, again against Australia, at Hove in 1987. She scored 577 runs in total, with a highest score of 90 at an average of 20.60. She also took 8 test wickets. She played 27 One Day Internationals, scoring 397 runs at 23.35 with a top score of 67 and taking 16 wickets at 22.37.
