= Donna Carmino =

Trinidadian cricketer (born 1957)

Personal information
- Full name: Donna Carmino
- Born: 1957 (age 68–69); Port of Spain, Trinidad
- Role: Batter

International information
- National side: International XI (1973)
- Only ODI (cap 2): 23 June 1973 v England

Career statistics
Competition	WODI
Matches	1
Runs scored	0
Batting average	0.00
100s/50s	0/0
Top score	0
Catches/stumpings	0/–
- Source: CricketArchive, 27 October 2021

Donna Carmino (born 1957) is a Trinidadian former cricketer. She appeared in one match for International XI at the 1973 Women's Cricket World Cup, against England. Batting at 7, she scored 0 runs.
