= Valerie Farrell =

Australian cricketer (born 1946)

Personal information
- Full name: Valerie Farrell
- Born: 15 December 1946 (age 79); Carlton, Melbourne, Australia
- Batting: Right-handed
- Bowling: Right-arm medium
- Role: All-rounder

International information
- National sides: International XI (1973); Australia (1978)
- ODI debut (cap 14/22): 18 July 1973; International XI v Trinidad and Tobago
- Last ODI: 13 January 1978; Australia v England

Domestic team information
- Years: Team
- 1970/71–1981/82: Victoria

Career statistics
Competition	WODI	WFC	WLA
Matches	5	13	24
Runs scored	80	386	279
Batting average	40.00	42.88	19.92
100s/50s	0/1	0/3	0/1
Top score	52*	91	52*
Balls bowled	24	270	176
Wickets	0	4	5
Bowling average	–	25.25	13.40
5 wickets in innings	–	0	0
10 wickets in match	–	0	0
Best bowling	–	2/2	2/22
Catches/stumpings	3/–	10/–	5/–
- Source: CricketArchive, 28 October 2021

Valerie Farrell (born 15 December 1946) is an Australia former cricketer who played as a right-handed batter and right-arm medium bowler. She appeared in 5 One Day Internationals: two for International XI at the 1973 World Cup and three for Australia at the 1978 World Cup. She played domestic cricket for Victoria.
