= Megan Lear =

English cricketer and coach

Personal information
- Full name: Megan Amy Lear
- Born: 31 August 1951 (age 75); Gravesend, Kent, England
- Batting: Right-handed
- Role: Batter

International information
- National sides: Young England (1973); England (1976–1985)
- Test debut (cap 81): 3 July 1976; England v Australia
- Last Test: 25 January 1985; England v Australia
- ODI debut (cap 9/18): 23 June 1973; Young England v Australia
- Last ODI: 4 February 1982; England v International XI

Domestic team information
- Years: Team
- 1971–1981: Kent
- 1982–1983: East Anglia
- 1984–1992: Kent

Career statistics
Competition	WTest	WODI	WFC	WLA
Matches	9	21	19	71
Runs scored	286	451	757	1,725
Batting average	19.06	28.18	25.23	28.27
100s/50s	0/0	0/3	0/3	1/9
Top score	39	58	72	104
Balls bowled	0	12	0	54
Wickets	–	1	–	1
Bowling average	–	0.00	–	27.00
5 wickets in innings	–	0	–	0
10 wickets in match	–	0	–	0
Best bowling	–	1/0	–	1/0
Catches/stumpings	12/–	3/–	16/–	20/–
- Source: CricketArchive, 28 February 2021

Megan Amy Lear (born 31 August 1951) is an English former cricketer who played as a right-handed batter. She appeared in 9 Test matches and 16 One Day Internationals for England between 1976 and 1985, and coached England during the 1997 World Cup. She also played 5 matches for Young England at the 1973 World Cup. She played domestic cricket for Kent and East Anglia.
