= Lynette Smith =

Australian cricketer (born 1950)

Personal information
- Full name: Lynette Smith
- Born: 1950 (age 75–76); Australia
- Batting: Right-handed
- Bowling: Right-arm medium
- Role: Batter

International information
- National side: International XI (1973)
- ODI debut (cap 10): 23 June 1973 v England
- Last ODI: 21 July 1973 v Australia

Domestic team information
- Years: Team
- 1969/70–1973/74: Western Australia

Career statistics
Competition	WODI	WFC	WLA
Matches	6	14	15
Runs scored	73	571	165
Batting average	14.60	25.95	11.78
100s/50s	0/0	0/5	0/0
Top score	29	97	38
Balls bowled	–	26	–
Wickets	–	1	–
Bowling average	–	14.00	–
5 wickets in innings	–	0	–
10 wickets in match	–	0	–
Best bowling	–	1/14	–
Catches/stumpings	2/–	10/–	2/–
- Source: CricketArchive, 14 March 2022

Lynette Smith (born 1950) is an Australian former cricketer who played as a right-handed batter. She appeared in six One Day Internationals for International XI at the 1973 World Cup. She played domestic cricket for Western Australia.
