= Paulette Lynch =

West Indies cricketer

Personal information
- Full name: Paulette Lynch
- Born: Jamaica
- Role: Bowler

International information
- National side: International XI (1973)
- ODI debut (cap 6): 23 June 1973 v England
- Last ODI: 18 July 1973 v Trinidad and Tobago

Domestic team information
- Years: Team
- 1973–1982: Jamaica

Career statistics
Competition	WODI	WLA
Matches	4	5
Runs scored	1	1
Batting average	–	–
100s/50s	0/0	0/0
Top score	1*	1*
Balls bowled	192	234
Wickets	4	6
Bowling average	25.00	20.66
5 wickets in innings	0	0
10 wickets in match	0	0
Best bowling	3/34	3/34
Catches/stumpings	1/–	1/–
- Source: CricketArchive, 14 March 2022

Paulette Lynch is a Jamaican former cricketer who played as a bowler. She appeared in four One Day Internationals for International XI at the 1973 World Cup. She played domestic cricket for Jamaica.
