= Rosalind Heggs =

English cricketer

Personal information
- Full name: Rosalind M Heggs
- Born: 1952 (age 73–74); Skegness, Lincolnshire, England
- Batting: Right-handed
- Bowling: Right-arm off break
- Role: All-rounder

International information
- National sides: Young England (1973); England (1978)
- ODI debut (cap 8/22): 23 June 1973; Young England v Australia
- Last ODI: 13 January 1978; England v Australia

Domestic team information
- Years: Team
- 1977–1995: Middlesex

Career statistics
Competition	WODI	WFC	WLA
Matches	9	12	82
Runs scored	56	322	1,733
Batting average	8.00	20.12	26.66
100s/50s	0/0	0/2	1/8
Top score	18	56	124
Balls bowled	463	1,446	4,304
Wickets	16	22	106
Bowling average	15.43	23.36	16.16
5 wickets in innings	0	0	0
10 wickets in match	–	0	–
Best bowling	3/16	3/29	4/14
Catches/stumpings	3/–	5/–	16/–
- Source: CricketArchive, 13 March 2021

Rosalind M Heggs (born 1952) is an English former cricketer who played as an all-rounder. She was a right-handed batter and right-arm off break bowler. She played for Young England in the 1973 Women's Cricket World Cup and the full England side in the 1978 Women's Cricket World Cup. She took 16 wickets at an average of 15.43 and scored 56 runs with a high score of 18 in her nine One Day Internationals. She played domestic cricket for Middlesex.
