= List of Young England women ODI cricketers =

This is a list of Young England women One Day International (ODI) cricketers. Overall, 14 women played in at least one women's one-day international for Young England. A One Day International, or an ODI, is an international cricket match between two representative teams, each having ODI status. An ODI differs from Test matches in that the number of overs per team is limited, and that each team has only one innings. The list is arranged in the order in which each player won her first ODI cap. Where more than one player won her first ODI cap in the same match, those players are listed alphabetically by surname.

All six of Young England women's ODI matches were played during the 1973 Women's Cricket World Cup.

== Key ==
General
*: an innings that ended not out
Mat: number of matches played
Batting
Inn: number of innings
NO: number of times an innings ends not out
Runs: number of runs scored by batsman/off bowler's bowling
HS: highest score
Avg: batting average
100/50: number of centuries and half-centuries scored

Bowling
Overs: number of overs bowled
Mdn: number of maiden overs (overs off which no runs were scored)
Wkt: number of wickets taken
BB: best bowling figures
Avg: bowling average
5wI: number of times 5 wickets were taken in an innings
Fielding
Ca: number of catches taken
St: number of stumpings made

== Players ==
All six of Young England women's ODI matches were played during the 1973 Women's Cricket World Cup. This list is arranged in the order in which each player won her first ODI cap.

Cap	Name	Career	Mat	Inn	NO	Runs	HS	Avg	100/50	Overs	Mdn	Runs	Wkt	BB	Avg	5wI	Ca	St	Ref
1	Katherine Brown	1973	3	3	1	22	15*	11.00	0/0	15	2	41	0	n/a	n/a	0	0	0	(Note: Katherine Brown, Jacqueline Court, Susan Goatman, Julia Greenwood, Rosalind Heggs, Megan Lear, Lynne Read, Margaret Wilks and Glynis Hullah all also played Women's One Day International matches for England women. Only their records for Young England women are given above.)
2	Jacqueline Court	1973	4	4	0	50	37	12.50	0/0	4	0	25	1	1/17	25.00	0	1	0	
3	Shirley Ellis	1973	5	5	0	62	30	12.40	0/0	48	15	103	2	1/6	51.50	0	1	0	
4	Susan Goatman	1973	6	6	0	54	26	9.00	0/0	0	0	0	0	n/a	n/a	0	1	0	
5	Yvonne Golland	1973	3	3	2	17	8*	17.00	0/0	0	0	0	0	n/a	n/a	0	0	0	
6	Lynne Green	1973	5	4	2	20	14*	10.00	0/0	3.2	0	22	0	n/a	n/a	0	0	0	
7	Julia Greenwood	1973	5	3	1	9	5*	4.50	0/0	51.4	15	123	9	3/21	13.66	0	1	0	
8	Rosalind Heggs	1973	6	6	0	55	18	9.16	0/0	56.4	7	179	12	3/16	14.91	0	2	0	
9	Megan Lear	1973	5	5	0	81	30	16.20	0/0	0	0	0	0	n/a	n/a	0	0	0	
10	Lynne Read	1973	6	4	2	10	5	5.00	0/0	0	0	0	0	n/a	n/a	0	4	3	
11	Margaret Wilks	1973	6	6	0	51	17	8.50	0/0	43	5	120	1	1/16	120.00	0	0	0	
12	Geraldine Davies	1973	5	5	0	157	65	31.40	0/2	0	0	0	0	n/a	n/a	0	1	0	
13	Glynis Hullah	1973	5	3	1	42	25*	21.00	0/0	51.1	15	117	8	4/8	14.62	0	3	0	
14	Julia Lloyd	1973	2	2	0	14	9	7.00	0/0	0	0	0	0	n/a	n/a	0	0	0	
