= Cathy Garlick =

Australian cricketer

Personal information
- Full name: Cathleen Garlick
- Batting: Right-handed
- Role: Batter; occasional wicket-keeper

International information
- National side: International XI (1973)
- ODI debut (cap 13): 7 July 1973 v Young England
- Last ODI: 14 July 1973 v Jamaica

Domestic team information
- Years: Team
- 1972/73–1977/78: Victoria

Career statistics
Competition	WODI	WFC	WLA
Matches	2	7	11
Runs scored	22	443	133
Batting average	22.00	73.83	66.50
100s/50s	0/0	2/1	0/0
Top score	22	150*	48*
Catches/stumpings	2/0	3/–	2/0
- Source: CricketArchive

Cathleen Garlick is an Australian former cricketer who played as a right-handed batter and occasional wicket-keeper. She appeared in two One Day Internationals for International XI, both at the 1973 World Cup. She played domestic cricket for Victoria.
