= Pamela Mather =

English cricketer (1945–2022)

Personal information
- Full name: Pamela Mather
- Born: 1945
- Died: 30 January 2022 (aged 76); Burwash, Sussex, England
- Role: Bowler

International information
- National side: England (1973)
- ODI debut (cap 7): 23 June 1973 v International XI
- Last ODI: 20 July 1973 v Trinidad and Tobago

Domestic team information
- Years: Team
- 1972–1974: East Anglia

Career statistics
Competition	WODI	WFC	WLA
Matches	5	11	9
Runs scored	–	12	3
Batting average	–	12.00	3.00
100s/50s	–	0/0	0/0
Top score	–	12	2*
Balls bowled	264	1,314	486
Wickets	2	19	7
Bowling average	50.00	19.21	25.00
5 wickets in innings	0	0	0
10 wickets in match	–	0	–
Best bowling	2/32	4/25	2/21
Catches/stumpings	0/–	0/–	1/–
- Source: CricketArchive, 13 March 2021

Pamela Mather (née Ferdinand; 1945 – 30 January 2022) was an English cricketer who played as a bowler. She appeared in five One Day Internationals for England in the 1973 Women's Cricket World Cup. She took two wickets at an average of 50.00 as England won the tournament. She played domestic cricket for East Anglia.

Mather died on 30 January 2022, aged 76.
