= Glynis Hullah =

English cricketer (born 1948)

Personal information
- Full name: Glynis Hullah
- Born: 8 August 1948 (age 78); Ealing, Middlesex, England
- Role: All-rounder

International information
- National sides: Young England (1973); England (1976–1982)
- Test debut (cap 79): 19 June 1976; England v Australia
- Last Test: 1 July 1979; England v West Indies
- ODI debut (cap 13/21): 30 June 1973; Young England v Jamaica
- Last ODI: 7 February 1982; England v Australia

Domestic team information
- Years: Team
- 1970–1986: Middlesex

Career statistics
Competition	WTest	WODI	WFC	WLA
Matches	4	20	14	41
Runs scored	4	94	154	440
Batting average	4.00	15.66	25.66	23.15
100s/50s	0/0	0/0	0/0	0/1
Top score	3*	25*	32*	96
Balls bowled	408	1,191	1,685	2,104
Wickets	3	23	24	47
Bowling average	66.66	21.04	25.79	17.76
5 wickets in innings	0	0	0	1
10 wickets in match	0	0	0	0
Best bowling	2/32	4/8	4/24	7/6
Catches/stumpings	0/–	7/–	3/–	9/–
- Source: CricketArchive, 28 February 2021

Glynis Hullah (born 8 August 1948) is an English former cricketer who played as a medium pace bowler. She appeared in 4 Test matches and 15 One Day Internationals for England between 1976 and 1982. Her final WODI appearance was in the final of the 1982 Women's Cricket World Cup. She also played 5 matches for Young England at the 1973 World Cup. She played domestic cricket for Middlesex.
