= Julia Greenwood =

English cricketer (born 1951)

Personal information
- Full name: Julia M Greenwood
- Born: 1 February 1951 (age 75); Dewsbury, Yorkshire, England
- Bowling: Right-arm fast
- Role: Bowler

International information
- National sides: Young England (1973); England (1976–1979)
- Test debut (cap 78): 19 June 1976; England v Australia
- Last Test: 1 July 1979; England v West Indies
- ODI debut (cap 7/17): 23 June 1973; Young England v Australia
- Last ODI: 7 July 1979; England v West Indies

Domestic team information
- Years: Team
- 1972–1980: Yorkshire

Career statistics
Competition	WTest	WODI	WFC	WLA
Matches	6	8	12	13
Runs scored	16	9	39	37
Batting average	5.33	4.50	6.50	9.25
100s/50s	0/0	0/0	0/0	0/0
Top score	11	5*	19	17*
Balls bowled	1,123	454	2,023	619
Wickets	29	13	45	19
Bowling average	16.13	17.07	18.42	14.05
5 wickets in innings	3	0	4	0
10 wickets in match	1	0	1	0
Best bowling	6/46	3/21	6/46	3/21
Catches/stumpings	0/–	1/–	2/–	1/–
- Source: CricketArchive, 28 February 2021

Julia Greenwood (born 1 February 1951) is an English former cricketer who played as a right-arm pace bowler. She appeared in 6 Test matches and 3 One Day Internationals for England between 1976 and 1979. She also played 5 matches for Young England at the 1973 World Cup. She played domestic cricket for Yorkshire.

In test cricket, she took 29 wickets at an average of 16.13, with best innings bowling figures of 6/46 and best match figures of 11/63, against the West Indies in 1979 at the St Lawrence Ground, Canterbury. These are the best match bowling figures in English women's test history. She took 13 wickets in her 8 one day internationals at an average of 17.07 with a best of 3/21.
