= Geraldine Davies =

English cricketer (born 1946)

Gerry Davies
Personal information
- Full name: Geraldine Ann Davies
- Born: 13 May 1946 (age 80); Caversham, Reading, England
- Batting: Right-handed
- Bowling: Right-arm medium
- Role: Batter

International information
- National side: Young England (1973)
- ODI debut (cap 12): 30 June 1973 v Jamaica
- Last ODI: 21 July 1973 v New Zealand

Domestic team information
- Years: Team
- 1965–2000: Surrey

Career statistics
Competition	WODI	WFC	WLA
Matches	5	9	78
Runs scored	157	233	1,480
Batting average	31.40	14.56	23.87
100s/50s	0/2	0/0	0/8
Top score	65	46	81
Balls bowled	–	96	1,213
Wickets	–	0	22
Bowling average	–	–	25.18
5 wickets in innings	–	0	0
10 wickets in match	–	–	–
Best bowling	–	–	3/16
Catches/stumpings	1/–	2/–	23/–
- Source: CricketArchive, 14 March 2021

Geraldine Ann Davies (born 13 May 1946) is an English former cricketer who played primarily as a right-handed batter. She appeared in five One Day Internationals for Young England at the 1973 World Cup. She played domestic cricket for Surrey.
