= Manor Fields =

Cricket ground in Bletchley, Buckinghamshire

Coordinates: 51.9942°N 0.7114°W

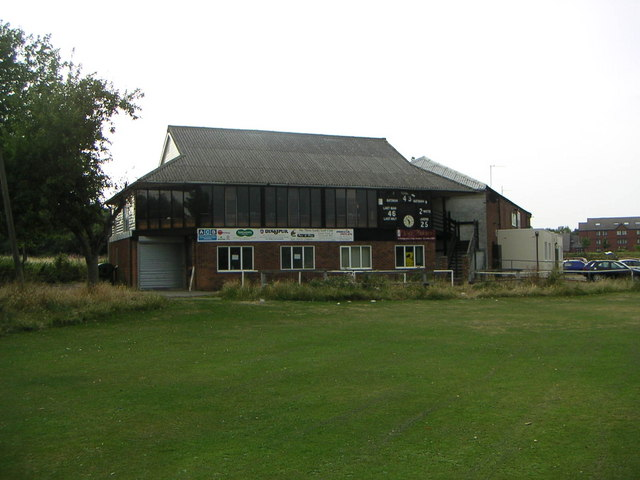
- Interactive map of Manor Fields

Ground information
- Location: Bletchley, Buckinghamshire
- Country: England
- Establishment: 1973 (first recorded match)

Team information
Northamptonshire	(1976-1984 & 1987)
Buckinghamshire	(1986 & 1988)
- As of 1 September 2010; Source: Ground profile

Manor Fields is a cricket ground in Bletchley, Buckinghamshire. The first recorded match on the ground was in 1973, when Young England women played International XI women in the ground's only Women's One Day International.

In 1975 the ground held its only Second XI Championship fixture when the Northamptonshire Second XI played the Lancashire Second XI. In 1976, the ground held its first List-A match when Northamptonshire played Lancashire in the John Player League. Between 1976 and 1983, the ground held 7 List-A matches, the last of which saw Northamptonshire play Middlesex in the 1983 John Player Special League.

Northamptonshire first played first-class cricket at the ground in 1980, against the touring West Indians. The ground held two further first-class matches, the first in 1984 which was a repeat of the 1980 fixture and the last of which saw Northamptonshire play the touring Pakistanis in 1987.

In 1986, Buckinghamshire played their first Minor Counties Championship fixture on the ground against the Somerset Second XI. They returned in 1988 to play their last Minor Counties Championship match at the ground to date, against Wales Minor Counties.

In local domestic cricket, the ground is the home venue of Bletchley Town Cricket Club.
