= Yvonne Golland =

English cricketer

Personal information
- Full name: Yvonne Golland
- Role: Bowler

International information
- National side: Young England (1973)
- ODI debut (cap 5): 23 June 1973 v Australia
- Last ODI: 21 July 1973 v New Zealand

Domestic team information
- Years: Team
- 1973–1976: West Midlands

Career statistics
Competition	WODI
Matches	3
Runs scored	17
Batting average	17.00
100s/50s	0/0
Top score	8*
Balls bowled	102
Wickets	2
Bowling average	31.50
5 wickets in innings	0
10 wickets in match	–
Best bowling	1/31
Catches/stumpings	0/–
- Source: CricketArchive, 14 March 2021

Yvonne Golland is an English former cricketer who played as a bowler. She appeared in three One Day Internationals for Young England in the 1973 Women's Cricket World Cup, scoring 17 runs and taking two wickets. She played domestic cricket for West Midlands.
