= Jackie Potter =

Australian cricketer (born 1948)

Personal information
- Full name: Jacqueline Potter
- Born: 9 April 1948 (age 78); Sydney, Australia
- Batting: Left-handed
- Bowling: Right-arm medium
- Role: Batter; occasional wicket-keeper

International information
- National side: Australia (1973–1975)
- Only Test (cap 77): 21 March 1975 v New Zealand
- ODI debut (cap 8): 23 June 1973 v Young England
- Last ODI: 28 June 1973 v England

Domestic team information
- Years: Team
- 1966/67–1982/83: New South Wales

Career statistics
Competition	WTest	WODI	WFC	WLA
Matches	1	6	35	34
Runs scored	78	167	1,130	1,185
Batting average	78.00	83.50	26.27	43.88
100s/50s	0/1	0/2	0/7	2/7
Top score	51	57	83*	105
Balls bowled	–	–	693	630
Wickets	–	–	19	6
Bowling average	–	–	6.36	41.16
5 wickets in innings	–	–	1	0
10 wickets in match	–	–	0	0
Best bowling	–	–	5/8	2/37
Catches/stumpings	0/–	1/–	28/1	3/0
- Source: CricketArchive, 12 November 2023

Jacqueline Potter (born 9 April 1948) is an Australian former cricketer who played as a left-handed batter, right-arm medium bowler and occasional wicket-keeper. She appeared in one Test match and six One Day Internationals for Australia between 1973 and 1975. She played domestic cricket for New South Wales.
