= 1973 Women's Cricket World Cup =

Tournament in England

1973 Women's World Cup
- Dates: 20 June – 28 July 1973
- Administrator: International Women's Cricket Council
- Cricket format: Women's One Day International (60-over)
- Tournament format: Round-robin
- Host: England
- Champions: England (1st title)
- Runners-up: Australia
- Participants: 7
- Matches: 21
- Most runs: (England) Enid Bakewell (264)
- Most wickets: (England) (YE) Rosalind Heggs (12)

The 1973 Women's Cricket World Cup was the inaugural Women's Cricket World Cup, held in England from 20 June to 28 July 1973. It was the first tournament of its kind, held two years before the first limited overs World Cup for men in 1975. The competition was won by the hosts, England. The competition was the brainchild of businessman Sir Jack Hayward, who contributed £40,000 towards its costs.

England, Australia, New Zealand, Trinidad and Tobago and Jamaica were joined by an International XI and a Young England team in a round-robin league which saw the team with the most points win the World Cup. England topped the group with 20 points from their six matches, including five victories and one defeat, while Australia were runners up posting 17 points with four wins.

The final round-robin match, held at Edgbaston on 28 July, was distinguished by a commanding century by Enid Bakewell of England, whose 118 formed the bedrock of England's imposing 279/3 in their 60 overs, with captain Rachael Heyhoe Flint scoring 64. Australia were restricted by tight England bowling and fell well short of their target, scoring 187/9. The cup was presented by Princess Anne and the winning England team were hosted at a reception at 10 Downing Street by Prime Minister Edward Heath.

Bakewell, one of England's finest all time players, was the leading run-scorer in the competition with 264 runs while Rosalind Heggs, of Young England, was the leading wicket-taker with 12 wickets. The next World Cup was held five years later in 1978.

== Standings ==
Pos	Team	Pld	W	L	T	NR	Pts
1	England	6	5	1	0	0	20
2	Australia	6	4	1	0	1	17
3	New Zealand	6	3	2	0	1	13
4	International XI	6	3	2	0	1	13
5	Trinidad and Tobago	6	2	4	0	0	8
6	Jamaica	6	1	4	0	1	5
7	Young England	6	1	5	0	0	4

Source: ESPNcricinfo

== Matches ==
=== New Zealand vs Jamaica ===
20 June 1973
Scorecard

Jamaica	v	New Zealand

Match abandoned without a ball bowled
Kew Green, London

- No toss.
- No play possible due to rain.

=== Australia vs Young England ===
23 June 1973
Scorecard

Young England; 57 (31.3 overs)	v	Australia; 58/3 (21 overs)
Megan Lear 9 Margaret Wilks 9 Tina Macpherson 5/14 (12 overs)		Jackie Potter 31*; Julia Greenwood 2/18 (7 overs)

Australia won by 7 wickets
Dean Park, Bournemouth
Umpires: Peg Culver (Eng) and Sheila Hill (Eng)

- Young England won the toss and elected to bat.
- Anne Gordon, Bev Wilson, Dawn Rae, Elaine Bray, Jackie Potter, Margaret Jennings, Miriam Knee, Patsy May, Tina Macpherson, Wendy Blunsden, Yvonne Golland (Aus), Jacqueline Court, Julia Greenwood, Katherine Brown, Lynne Green, Lynne Read, Margaret Wilks, Megan Lear, Rosalind Heggs, Shirley Ellis and Susan Goatman (YE) all made their WODI debuts.
- Tina Macpherson took the first 5-wicket haul in Women's ODI cricket.

=== England vs International XI ===
23 June 1973
Scorecard

England; 258/1 (60 overs)	v	International XI; 123/8 (60 overs)
Lynne Thomas 134		Trish McKelvey 54; Lesley Clifford 3/19 (12 overs)

England won by 135 runs
County Ground, Hove
Umpires: Elizabeth Riley (Eng) and Jane Ayres (Eng)

- England won the toss and elected to bat.
- Lynne Thomas, Enid Bakewell, Rachael Heyhoe Flint, Chris Watmough, June Stephenson, Jill Cruwys, Lesley Clifford, Sue Hilliam, Mary Pilling, Shirley Hodges, Pamela Mather (Eng), Audrey Disbury, Lynette Smith, Trish McKelvey, Sue Rattray, Margaret Jude, Eileen Badham, Donna Carmino, Betty McDonald, Wendy Williams and Paulette Lynch (Int XI) all made their WODI debuts.
- Lynne Thomas scored the first century in Women's ODI cricket.

=== New Zealand vs Trinidad & Tobago ===
23 June 1973
Scorecard

New Zealand; 197 (59.5 overs)	v	Trinidad and Tobago; 61 (31.2 overs)
Lynda Prichard 70; Nora St. Rose 2/14 (11 overs)		Louise Brown 21; Glenys Page 6/20 (6.2 overs)

New Zealand won by 136 runs
Clarence Park, St Albans
Umpires: Esme Irwin (Eng) and May Howard (Eng)

- Trinidad & Tobago won the toss and elected to field.
- Barb Bevege, Bev Brentnall, Carol Marett, Glenys Page, Jenny Olson, Jill Saulbrey, Jos Burley, Judi Doull, Lynda Prichard, Maureen Peters, Shirley Cowles (NZ), Beverly Browne, Christine Jacobson, Emelda Noreiga, Jane Joseph, Janice Moses, Jasmine Sammy, Joyce Demmin, Louise Browne, Maureen Phillips, Menota Tekah and Nora St. Rose (T&T) all made their WODI debuts.

=== Trinidad & Tobago vs Australia ===
30 June 1973
Scorecard

Trinidad and Tobago; 124 (52.4 overs)	v	Australia; 125/3 (45.3 overs)
Louise Browne 49; Miriam Knee 4/26 (12 overs)		Jackie Potter 56*; Nora St. Rose 1/11 (12 overs)

Australia won by 7 wickets
Tring Park Cricket Club Ground, Tring
Umpires: Margaret Loomes (Eng) and May Howard (Eng)

- Australia won the toss and elected to field.
- Raelee Thompson (Aus), Florence Douglas, Merlyn Edwards and Jeanette James (T&T) all made their WODI debuts.

=== New Zealand vs International XI ===
30 June 1973
Scorecard

New Zealand; 136/8 (60 overs)	v	International XI; 140/8 (59.5 overs)
Judi Doull 42; Wendy Williams 3/20 (12 overs)		Audrey Disbury 44; Jackie Lord 3/31 (12 overs)

International XI won by 2 wickets
Queen's Park, Chesterfield
Umpires: Anne Flann (Eng) and Peg Culver (Eng)

- International XI won the toss and elected to field.
- Pamela Crain (Int XI), Liz Allan, Jackie Lord and Ethna Rouse (NZ) all made their WODI debuts.

=== Jamaica vs Young England ===
30 June 1973
Scorecard

Jamaica; 124 (51.1 overs)	v	Young England; 101 (57.3 overs)
Vivalyn Latty-Scott 61; Glynis Hullah 4/8 (7.1 overs)		Geraldine Davies 21; Madge Stewart 4/9 (6 overs)

Jamaica won by 23 runs
Gore Court, Sittingbourne
Umpires: Jane Ayres (Eng) and Veronica Reichwald (Eng)

- Young England won the toss and elected to field.
- Evelyn Bogle, Dorrett Davis, Elaine Emmanual, Peggy Fairweather, Yolande Geddes-Hall, Dorothy Hobson, Vivalyn Latty-Scott, Loretta McIntosh, Madge Stewart, Yvonne Oldfield, Grace Williams (Jam), Geraldine Davies and Glynis Hullah (YE) all made their WODI debuts.

=== Jamaica vs Trinidad & Tobago ===
4 July 1973
Scorecard

Jamaica; 97 (51.5 overs)	v	Trinidad and Tobago; 98/8 (48.4 overs)
Grace Williams 29; Jane Joseph 2/14 (9.5 overs)		Louise Browne 50*; Grace Williams 4/11 (10.4 overs)

Trinidad & Tobago won by 2 wickets
Ealing Cricket Club Ground, Ealing
Umpires: Anne Flann (Eng) and Elizabeth Riley (Eng)

- Jamaica won the toss and elected to field.
- Audrey McInnis (Jam) made her WODI debut.

=== Australia vs New Zealand ===
7 July 1973
Scorecard

Australia; 137/6 (60 overs)	v	New Zealand; 102 (55.3 overs)
Bev Wilson 50; Carol Marett 3/30 (12 overs)		Jill Saulbrey 17*; Tina Macpherson 2/16 (9.3 overs)

Australia won by 35 runs
Hesketh Park, Dartford
Umpires: Elizabeth Riley (Eng) and Jane Ayres (Eng)

- New Zealand won the toss and elected to field.

=== England vs Jamaica ===
7 July 1973
Scorecard

England; 191/7 (49 overs)	v	Jamaica; 128/9 (49 overs)
Lynne Thomas 70; Evelyn Bogle 2/44 (9 overs)		Evelyn Bogle 45; Mary Pilling 2/9 (9 overs)

England won by 63 runs
Park Avenue, Bradford
Umpires: June Bragger (Eng) and May Howard (Eng)

- Jamaica won the toss and elected to field.
- Match reduced to 49 overs per side due to rain.

=== Young England vs International XI ===
7 July 1973
Scorecard

Young England; 165/7 (60 overs)	v	International XI; 151/8 (60 overs)
Geraldine Davies 65; Gloria Farrell 2/20 (9 overs)		Lynette Smith 29; Rosalind Heggs 3/38 (12 overs)

Young England won by 14 runs
Manor Fields, Bletchley
Umpires: Peg Culver (Eng) and Veronica Reichwald (Eng)

- International XI won the toss and elected to field.
- Cathy Garlick (Int XI) and Julia Lloyd (YE) both made their WODI debuts.

=== Australia vs Jamaica ===
11 July 1973
Scorecard

Australia; 195/7 (60 overs)	v	Jamaica; 118 (56.3 overs)
Margaret Jennings 36; Peggy Fairweather 2/40 (12 overs)		Yolande Geddes-Hall 30*; Lorraine Hill 4/11 (10.3 overs)

Australia won by 77 runs
Clifton Park Ground, York
Umpires: Elizabeth Riley (Eng) and Margaret Loomes (Eng)

- Jamaica won the toss and elected to field.
- Lorraine Hill (Aus) and Hyacinth Flemmings (Jam) both made their WODI debuts.

=== New Zealand vs England ===
14 July 1973
Scorecard

New Zealand; 105/7 (35 overs)	v	England; 34/1 (15 overs)
Ethna Rouse 48; Mary Pilling 2/6 (7 overs)		Lynne Thomas 19*; Maureen Peters 1/4 (7 overs)

New Zealand won by 11 runs (revised target)
The Maer Ground, Exmouth
Umpires: Jane Ayres (Eng) and Peg Culver (Eng)

- England won the toss and elected to field.
- Match reduced to 35 overs per side due to rain.
- Further rain curtailed England's innings after 15 overs; target calculated using average run rate method was 46 runs from 15 overs.
- Kay Green (Eng) made her WODI debut.

=== Jamaica vs International XI ===
14 July 1973
Scorecard

Jamaica; 162/8 (60 overs)	v	International XI; 163/5 (55.4 overs)
Vivalyn Latty-Scott 58; Eileen Badham 4/19 (12 overs)		Sue Rattray 63*; Peggy Fairweather 2/23 (12 overs)

International XI won by 5 wickets
Ivanhoe Cricket Club, Kirby Muxloe
Umpires: Esme Irwin (Eng) and Sheila Hill (Eng)

- International XI won the toss and elected to field.

=== Young England vs Trinidad & Tobago ===
14 July 1973
Scorecard

Young England; 90 (51 overs)	v	Trinidad and Tobago; 91/5 (38.5 overs)
Rosalind Heggs 17; Jane Joseph 3/7 (10 overs)		Jane Joseph 23*; Rosalind Heggs 3/23 (10.5 overs)

Trinidad & Tobago won by 5 wickets
Fenner's, Cambridge
Umpires: Elizabeth Riley (Eng) and May Howard (Eng)

- Young England won the toss and elected to bat.

=== England vs Young England ===
18 July 1973
Scorecard

England; 231/6 (60 overs)	v	Young England; 102/7 (39 overs)
Rachael Heyhoe Flint 114; Glynis Hullah 2/37 (12 overs)		Shirley Ellis 30; Megan Lear 30; Pamela Mather 2/32 (11 overs)

England won by 49 runs (revised target)
Valentines Park, Ilford
Umpires: Jane Ayres (Eng) and May Howard (Eng)

- Young England won the toss and elected to field.
- Rain reduced Young England's chase to 39 overs; target calculated using average run rate method was 152 runs from 39 overs.
- Heather Dewdney and Jane Gough (Eng) both made their WODI debuts.

=== International XI vs Trinidad & Tobago ===
18 July 1973
Scorecard

Trinidad and Tobago; 115/8 (60 overs)	v	International XI; 117/3 (42.2 overs)
Beverly Browne 36; Gloria Farrell 2/18 (9 overs)		Valerie Farrell 52*; Nora St. Rose 3/16 (12 overs)

International XI won by 7 wickets
Aigburth, Liverpool
Umpires: Anne Flann (Eng) and Margaret Loomes (Eng)

- International XI won the toss and elected to field.
- Valerie Farrell (Int XI) made her WODI debut.

=== Trinidad & Tobago vs England ===
20 July 1973
Scorecard

Trinidad and Tobago; 59 (45.5 overs)	v	England; 62/2 (25.5 overs)
Jane Joseph 21; June Stephenson 3/4 (8 overs)		Rachael Heyhoe Flint 32*; Christine Jacobson 2/29 (12 overs)

England won by 8 wickets
Wolverhampton Cricket Club Ground, Wolverhampton
Umpires: Elizabeth Riley (Eng) and Peg Culver (Eng)

- Trinidad & Tobago won the toss and elected to bat.

=== International XI vs Australia ===
21 July 1973
Scorecard

International XI; 5/1 (4.4 overs)	v	Australia
Trish McKelvey 2* Tina Macpherson 1/3 (2.4 overs)

No result
St. Helen's, Swansea
Umpires: Anne Flann (Eng) and May Howard (Eng)

- Australia won the toss and elected to field.
- No further play possible due to rain.
- Wendy Weir (Aus) made her WODI debut.

=== Young England vs New Zealand ===
21 July 1973
Scorecard

Young England; 174/6 (50 overs)	v	New Zealand; 177/7 (58.5 overs)
Geraldine Davies 51; Jill Saulbrey 2/32 (12 overs)		Shirley Cowles 46; Rosalind Heggs 2/44 (11.5 overs)

New Zealand won by 3 wickets
The Saffrons, Eastbourne
Umpires: Sheila Hill (Eng) and Veronica Reichwald (Eng)

- New Zealand won the toss and elected to field.

=== England v Australia ===
28 July 1973
Scorecard

England; 279/3 (60 overs)	v	Australia; 187/9 (60 overs)
Enid Bakewell 118; Miriam Knee 2/53 (11 overs)		Jackie Potter 57; Enid Bakewell 2/28 (12 overs)

England won by 92 runs
Edgbaston Cricket Ground, Birmingham
Umpires: Jane Ayres (Eng) and Sheila Hill (Eng)

- England won the toss and elected to bat.

== Statistics ==
=== Most runs ===
Player (Note: Batting averages are listed only for those players who scored in excess of 150 runs.)	Team	Matches	Innings	Runs	Average	Highest Score	100s	50s
Enid Bakewell	England	6	4	264	88.00	118	2	0
Lynne Thomas	England	5	4	263	87.66	134	1	1
Rachael Heyhoe Flint	England	6	6	257	85.66	114	1	1
Jackie Potter	Australia	6	5	167	83.50	57	0	2
Vivalyn Latty-Scott	Jamaica	5	5	168	33.60	61	0	2
Geraldine Davies	Young England	5	5	157	31.40	65	0	2
Louise Browne	Trinidad and Tobago	6	6	150	30.00	50*	0	1

=== Most wickets ===
Player (Note: Bowling averages are listed only for those players who bowled over 20 overs and have a bowling average better than 15.)	Team	Matches	Balls	Wickets	Average	Economy	BBI	4wi
Rosalind Heggs	Young England	6	340	12	14.91	3.15	3/16	0
Tina Macpherson	Australia	5	253	9	11.00	2.34	5/14	1
Julia Greenwood	Young England	5	310	9	13.66	2.38	3/21	0
Mary Pilling	England	6	354	9	10.22	1.55	2/6	0
Glynis Hullah	Young England	5	307	8	14.62	2.28	4/8	1
Nora St Rose	Trinidad and Tobago	6	396	8	10.25	1.24	3/16	0
June Stephenson	England	6	270	7	13.42	2.08	3/4	0
