= Wendy Williams (cricketer) =

Welsh cricketer

Personal information
- Full name: Wendy Williams
- Born: 21 April 1942; Wales
- Died: 3 March 2012 (aged 69); Sutton Coldfield, West Midlands, England
- Batting: Right-handed
- Bowling: Right-arm medium
- Role: Bowler

International information
- National side: International XI (1973)
- ODI debut (cap 11): 23 June 1973 v England
- Last ODI: 21 July 1973 v Australia

Domestic team information
- Years: Team
- 1974–1984: West Midlands

Career statistics
Competition	WODI	WFC	WLA
Matches	6	5	15
Runs scored	27	1	40
Batting average	13.50	0.50	10.00
100s/50s	0/0	0/0	0/0
Top score	18	1*	18
Balls bowled	360	837	858
Wickets	6	12	12
Bowling average	26.66	24.25	27.91
5 wickets in innings	0	0	0
10 wickets in match	0	0	0
Best bowling	3/20	3/31	4/8
Catches/stumpings	0/–	0/–	1/–
- Source: CricketArchive, 16 April 2021

Wendy Williams (21 April 1942 – 3 March 2012) was a Welsh cricketer who played as a right-arm medium bowler. She appeared in 6 One Day Internationals for International XI at the 1973 World Cup. She played domestic cricket for West Midlands.
