= Pamela Crain =

English cricketer (1939–2025)

Personal information
- Full name: Pamela Ann Crain
- Born: 17 July 1939; St Albans, Hertfordshire, England
- Died: 15 October 2025 (aged 86); Chippenham, Wiltshire, England
- Batting: Right-handed
- Bowling: Right-arm medium
- Role: All-rounder

International information
- National side: International XI (1973)
- ODI debut (cap 12): 30 June 1973 v New Zealand
- Last ODI: 21 July 1973 v Australia

Domestic team information
- Years: Team
- 1963–1981: East Anglia

Career statistics
Competition	WODI	WFC	WLA
Matches	4	8	5
Runs scored	53	198	60
Batting average	17.66	18.00	15.00
100s/50s	0/0	0/1	0/0
Top score	22	63	22
Balls bowled	120	156	120
Wickets	0	2	0
Bowling average	–	34.50	–
5 wickets in innings	0	0	0
10 wickets in match	0	0	0
Best bowling	–	1/9	–
Catches/stumpings	0/–	0/–	1/–
- Source: CricketArchive, 27 June 2021

Pamela Ann Crain (17 July 1939 – 15 October 2025) was an English cricketer who played as a right-handed batter and right-arm medium bowler. She appeared in 4 One Day Internationals for International XI at the 1973 World Cup. She was also part of the England side that toured South Africa in 1960–61. She played domestic cricket for East Anglia.
