= Women's Cricket World Cup =

One Day International competition

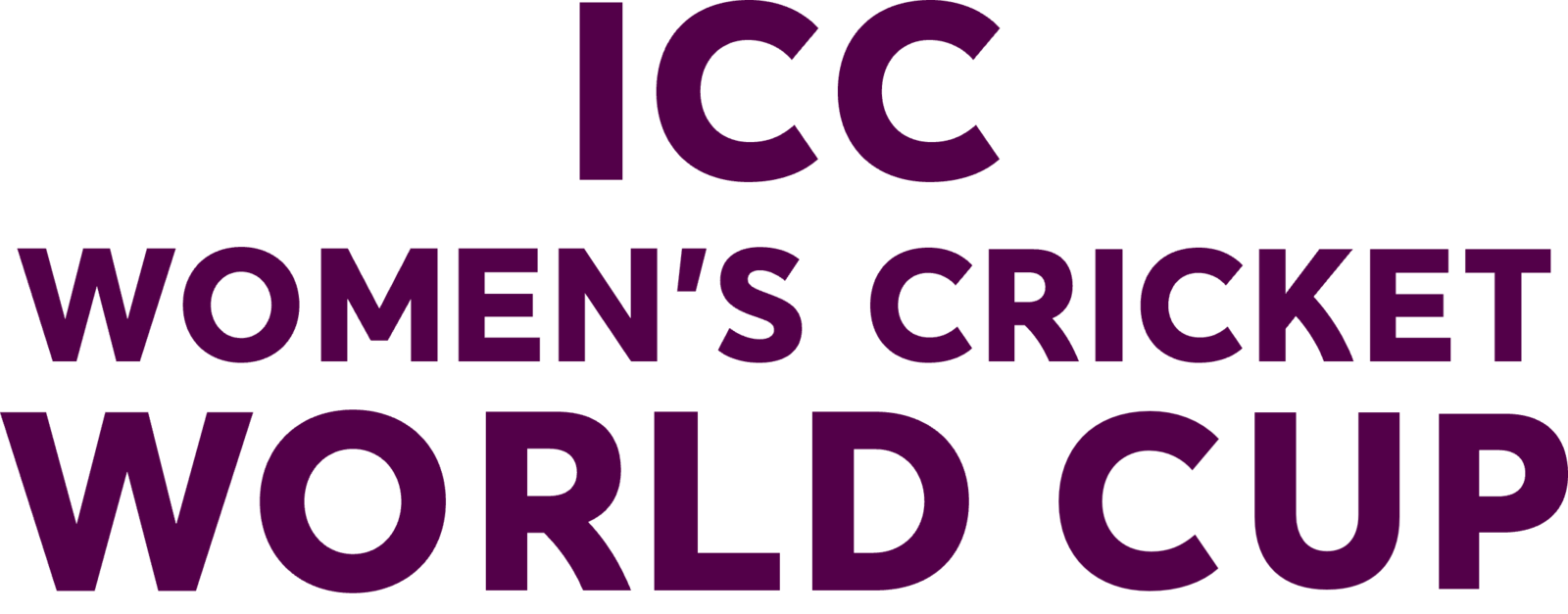
- World Cup logo
- Administrator: International Cricket Council
- Format: ODI
- First edition: 1973; England
- Latest edition: 2025; India
- Number of teams: 10
- Current champion: India (1st title)
- Most successful: Australia (7 titles)
- Most runs: (New Zealand) Debbie Hockley (1,501)
- Most wickets: (South Africa) Marizanne Kapp (44)

The ICC Women's Cricket World Cup is the quadrennial international championship of the One Day International format with 50 overs per team. It is organised by the International Cricket Council.

Until 2005, when the two organisations merged, it was administered by a separate body, the International Women's Cricket Council. The first World Cup was held in England in 1973, two years before the inaugural men's tournament. The event's early years were marked by funding difficulties, which meant several teams had to decline invitations to compete and caused gaps of up to six years between tournaments. However, since 2005, World Cups have been hosted at regular four-year intervals.

Qualification for the World Cup is through the ICC Women's Championship and the World Cup Qualifier. The 1997 edition was contested by eleven teams and since then no new teams have debuted in the tournament. Since 2000 the number of teams in the World Cup has been fixed at eight. However, in March 2021, the ICC decided that the tournament would expand to 10 teams from the 2029 edition.

The thirteen World Cups played have been held in five countries, with India and England having hosted the event three times. Australia is the most successful team, having won seven titles and failing to make the final on only four occasions. England (four titles), New Zealand and India (one title each) are the only other teams to have won the event, while the West Indies and South Africa (once each) have each reached the final without going on to win.

== History ==
=== First World Cup ===
Women's international cricket was first played in 1934, when a party from England toured Australia and New Zealand. The first Test match was played on 28–31 December 1934, and was won by England. The first Test against New Zealand followed early the following year. These three nations remained the only Test-playing teams in women's cricket until 1960, when South Africa played a number of matches against England. Limited overs cricket was first played by first-class teams in England in 1962. Nine years later, the first international one day match was played in men's cricket, when England took on Australia at the Melbourne Cricket Ground.

Talks began in 1971 about holding a World Cup for women's cricket, led by Jack Hayward. South Africa, under pressure from the world for their apartheid laws, were not invited to take part in the competition. Both of the other two Test-playing nations, Australia and New Zealand were invited. Hayward had previously organised tours of the West Indies by England women and it was from this region that the other two competing nations were drawn; Jamaica and Trinidad & Tobago. To make up the numbers England also fielded a "Young England" team, and an "International XI" was also included. Five South Africans were invited to play for the International XI as a means of compensation for the team not being invited but these invitations were later withdrawn.

The inaugural tournament was held at a variety of venues across England in June and July 1973, two years before the first men's Cricket World Cup was played. The competition was played as a round-robin tournament and the last scheduled match was England against Australia. Australia went into the game leading the table by a solitary point; they had won four matches and had one abandoned. England had also won four matches but they had lost to New Zealand. As a result, the match also served as a de facto final for the competition. England won the match, held at Edgbaston Birmingham, by 92 runs to win the tournament.

== Editions and results ==
Fifteen teams have appeared at the Women's Cricket World Cup at least once, excluding qualification tournaments. Three teams have competed at every tournament: England, Australia and New Zealand. They were the only sides to have won a title until 2025, when India won their first title.

S.No.	Year	Host(s)	Final venue	Final			Teams	Winning Captain
S.No.	Year	Host(s)	Final venue	Winners	Result	Runners-up	Teams	Winning Captain
1	1973	England	No final	England; 20 points	England won on points table	Australia; 17 points	7	Rachael Heyhoe Flint
2	1978	India	No final	Australia; 6 points	Australia won on points table	England; 4 points	4	Margaret Jennings
3	1982	New Zealand	Lancaster Park, Christchurch	Australia; 152/7 (59 overs)	Australia won by 3 wickets scorecard	England; 151/5 (60 overs)	5	Sharon Tredrea
4	1988	Australia	Melbourne Cricket Ground, Melbourne	Australia; 129/2 (44.5 overs)	Australia won by 8 wickets scorecard	England; 127/7 (60 overs)	5	Sharon Tredrea
5	1993	England	Lord's, London	England; 195/5 (60 overs)	England won by 67 runs scorecard	New Zealand; 128 (55.1 overs)	8	Karen Smithies
6	1997	India	Eden Gardens, Kolkata	Australia; 165/5 (47.4 overs)	Australia won by 5 wickets scorecard	New Zealand; 164 (49.3 overs)	11	Belinda Clark
7	2000	New Zealand	Bert Sutcliffe Oval, Lincoln	New Zealand; 184 (48.4 overs)	New Zealand won by 4 runs scorecard	Australia; 180 (49.1 overs)	8	Emily Drumm
8	2005	South Africa	SuperSport Park, Centurion	Australia; 215/4 (50 overs)	Australia won by 98 runs scorecard	India; 117 (46 overs)	8	Belinda Clark
9	2009	Australia	North Sydney Oval, Sydney	England; 167/6 (46.1 overs)	England won by 4 wickets scorecard	New Zealand; 166 (47.2 overs)	8	Charlotte Edwards
10	2013	India	Brabourne Stadium, Mumbai	Australia; 259/7 (50 overs)	Australia won by 114 runs scorecard	West Indies; 145 (43.1 overs)	8	Jodie Fields
11	2017	England	Lord's, London	England; 228/7 (50 overs)	England won by 9 runs scorecard	India; 219 (48.4 overs)	8	Heather Knight
12	2022	New Zealand	Hagley Oval, Christchurch	Australia; 356/5 (50 overs)	Australia won by 71 runs scorecard	England; 285 (43.4 overs)	8	Meg Lanning
13	2025	India; Sri Lanka (Note: The official sole host for the tournament was India. Following an agreement between the BCCI and the PCB, the ICC confirmed Sri Lanka as hosts for all Pakistani matches as well as some Sri Lankan games.)	DY Patil Stadium, Navi Mumbai	India; 298/7 (50 overs)	India won by 52 runs scorecard	South Africa; 246 (45.3 overs)	8	Harmanpreet Kaur
14	2029	TBA	TBA	TBA	TBA	TBA	10	TBA

== Performance by nations ==
=== Overview ===
The table below provides an overview of the performances of nations over past World Cups, as of the end of the 2025 tournament. Teams are sorted by best performance, then by appearances, total number of wins, total number of games, and alphabetical order respectively.

	Appearances				Statistics					
Team	Total	First	Latest	Best performance	Mat.	Won	Lost	Tie	NR	Win%
Australia	13	1973	2025	Champions (1978, 1982, 1988, 1997, 2005, 2013, 2022)	100	85	12	1	2	86.73
England	13	1973	2025	Champions (1973, 1993, 2009, 2017)	100	67	29	2	2	68.36
New Zealand	13	1973	2025	Champions (2000)	94	55	34	2	3	60.43
India	11	1978	2025	Champions (2025)	79	42	34	1	2	54.54
South Africa	8	1997	2025	Runners-up (2025)	55	26	27	0	2	49.05
West Indies	8	1993	2022	Runners-up (2013)	46	16	28	0	1	34.78
International XI^{‡}	2	1973	1982	4th place (1973)	18	3	14	0	1	16.66
Ireland	5	1988	2005	Quarter-finals (1997)	34	7	26	0	1	20.58
Sri Lanka	7	1997	2025	Quarter-finals (1997), 5th place (2013 & 2025)	41	9	29	0	2	23.68
Netherlands	4	1988	2000	Quarter-finals (1997)	26	2	24	0	0	7.69
Trinidad & Tobago^{†}	1	1973	1973	5th place (1973)	6	2	4	0	0	33.33
Pakistan	6	1997	2025	6th place (2009)	37	3	31	0	3	8.82
Jamaica^{†}	1	1973	1973	6th place (1973)	5	1	4	0	0	20.00
Bangladesh	2	2022	2025	7th place (2022, 2025)	14	2	11	0	1	15.38
Denmark	2	1993	1997	7th place (1993)	13	2	11	0	0	15.38
Young England^{‡}	1	1973	1973	Bottom place (1973)	6	1	5	0	0	16.66
As of 2 November 2025 Source: ESPNcricinfo

†No longer have ODI status. ‡No longer exists.

Legend

- 1st – Champions
- 2nd – Runners-up
- 3rd – Third place
- SF – Losing semi-finalist (no third-place playoff)
- QF – Losing quarter-finalist (no further playoffs)
- — Hosts

Team	(England) 1973 (7)	(India) 1978 (4)	(New Zealand) 1982 (5)	(Australia) 1988 (5)	(England) 1993 (8)	(India) 1997 (11)	(New Zealand) 2000 (8)	(South Africa) 2005 (8)	(Australia) 2009 (8)	(India) 2013 (8)	(England) 2017 (8)	(New Zealand) 2022 (8)	(India) (Sri Lanka) 2025 (8)	Total
Australia	2nd	1st	1st	1st	3rd	1st	2nd	1st	4th	1st	SF	1st	SF	13
Bangladesh	–	–	–	–	–	–	–	–	–	–	–	7th	7th	2
Denmark	–	–	–	–	7th	9th	–	–	–	–	–	–	–	2
England	1st	2nd	2nd	2nd	1st	SF	5th	SF	1st	3rd	1st	2nd	SF	13
India	–	4th	4th	–	4th	SF	SF	2nd	3rd	7th	2nd	5th	1st	11
Ireland	–	–	–	4th	5th	QF	7th	8th	–	–	–	–	–	5
Netherlands	–	–	–	5th	8th	QF	8th	–	–	–	–	–	–	4
New Zealand	3rd	3rd	3rd	3rd	2nd	2nd	1st	SF	2nd	4th	5th	6th	6th	13
Pakistan	–	–	–	–	–	11th	–	–	5th	8th	8th	8th	8th	6
South Africa	–	–	–	–	–	QF	SF	7th	7th	6th	SF	SF	2nd	8
Sri Lanka	–	–	–	–	–	QF	6th	6th	8th	5th	7th	–	5th	7
West Indies	–	–	–	–	6th	10th	–	5th	6th	2nd	6th	SF	–	7
Defunct teams
International XI	4th	–	5th	–	–	–	–	–	–	–	–	–	–	2
Jamaica	6th	–	–	–	–	–	–	–	–	–	–	–	–	1
Trinidad & Tobago	5th	–	–	–	–	–	–	–	–	–	–	–	–	1
Young England	7th	–	–	–	–	–	–	–	–	–	–	–	–	1

=== Debutant teams ===
Year	Teams
1973	Australia, England, New Zealand, International XI^{‡}, Jamaica^{†}, Trinidad and Tobago^{†}, Young England^{‡}
1978	India
1982	none
1988	Ireland, Netherlands
1993	Denmark, West Indies
1997	Pakistan, South Africa, Sri Lanka
2000	none
2005	none
2009	none
2013	none
2017	none
2022	Bangladesh
2025	none

†No longer have ODI status. ‡No longer exists.

== Awards ==
=== Player of the Tournament ===
Year	Player	Performance details
1988	(England) Carole Hodges	336 runs & 12 wickets
2000	(Australia) Lisa Keightley	375 runs
2005	(Australia) Karen Rolton	246 runs
2009	(England) Claire Taylor	324 runs
2013	(New Zealand) Suzie Bates	407 runs
2017	(England) Tammy Beaumont	410 runs
2022	(Australia) Alyssa Healy	509 runs
2025	(India) Deepti Sharma	215 runs & 22 wickets

=== Player of the Final ===
Year	Player	Performance details
1993	(England) Jo Chamberlain	38 (33) & 1/28 (9)
1997	(New Zealand) Debbie Hockley	79 (121)
2000	(Australia) Belinda Clark	91 (102)
2005	(Australia) Karen Rolton	107* (128)
2009	(England) Nicky Shaw	4/34 (8.2)
2013	(Australia) Jess Cameron	75 (76)
2017	(England) Anya Shrubsole	6/46 (9.4)
2022	(Australia) Alyssa Healy	170 (138)
2025	(India) Shafali Verma	87 (78) & 2/36 (7)

== Team statistics ==
=== Results of host teams ===
Year	Host Team	Finish
1973	England	Champions
1978	India	4th place
1982	New Zealand	3rd place
1988	Australia	Champions
1993	England	Champions
1997	India	Semi-finalists
2000	New Zealand	Champions
2005	South Africa	7th place
2009	Australia	4th place
2013	India	7th place
2017	England	Champions
2022	New Zealand	6th place
2025	India	Champions
2025	Sri Lanka	5th place

=== Results of defending champions ===
Year	Defending champions	Finish
1978	England	Runners-up
1982	Australia	Champions
1988	Australia	Champions
1993	Australia	3rd place
1997	England	Semi-finalists
2000	Australia	Runners-up
2005	New Zealand	Semi-finalists
2009	Australia	4th place
2013	England	3rd place
2017	Australia	Semi-finalists
2022	England	Runners-up
2025	Australia	Semi-finalists
2029	India	

== Tournament records ==
World Cup records
Batting
Most runs	(New Zealand) Debbie Hockley	1,501	1982–2000
Highest average (min. 10 innings)	(Australia) Karen Rolton	74.92	1997–2009
Highest score	(Australia) Belinda Clark (v Denmark)	229*	1997
Highest partnership	(England) Tammy Beaumont & Sarah Taylor (v South Africa)	275	2017
Most runs in a tournament	(South Africa) Laura Wolvaardt	571	2025
Bowling
Most wickets	(South Africa) Marizanne Kapp	44	2009–2025
Lowest average (min. 500 balls bowled)	(New Zealand) Katrina Keenan	9.72	1997–2000
Best bowling figures	(Australia) Alana King (v South Africa)	7/18	2025
Most wickets in a tournament	(Australia) Lyn Fullston	23	1982
Fielding
Most dismissals (wicket-keeper)	(England) Jane Smit	40	1993–2005
Most catches	(England) Janette Brittin	19	1982–1997
Most catches	(New Zealand) Suzie Bates	19	2009–2025
Team
Highest score	Australia (v Denmark)	412/3	1997
Lowest score	Pakistan (v Australia)	27	1997
Highest win %	Australia	86.73	
Most Wins	Australia	85	

== See also ==
- Cricket World Cup – Men's One Day International (ODI) event
- ICC Women's Champions Trophy – International cricket competition
- ICC Women's Championship – International cricket tournament
- Men's T20 World Cup – International cricket competition
- Women's T20 World Cup – Women's Twenty20 International (T20I) Cricket World Cup

== Bibliography ==
- Heyhoe Flint, Rachael; Rheinberg, Netta (1976). Fair Play: The story of women's cricket. London: Angus and Robertson. ISBN 0-207-95698-7.
