= Young England women's cricket team =

Youth cricket team representing England

Young England
- Flag of England

One Day Internationals
- First ODI: v Australia at Dean Park Cricket Ground, Bournemouth; 23 June 1973
- Last ODI: v New Zealand at The Saffrons, Eastbourne; 21 July 1973
ODIs	Played	Won/Lost
Total	6	1/5 (0 ties, 0 no result)
- World Cup appearances: 1 (first in 1973)
- Best result: 7th (1973)
- As of 3 January 2019

The Young England women's cricket team was a team that played in the 1973 Women's Cricket World Cup. They were an Under 25 side, playing in addition to the senior England team. They finished last in the seven-team tournament, their only win coming against International XI.

== History ==
Young England was formed to compete in the 1973 Women's Cricket World Cup, "making up the numbers" along with International XI after South Africa was not invited due to apartheid. The side was captained by Susan Goatman.

Young England's first match of the tournament was against Australia, in which they were bowled out for just 57 and lost by 7 wickets. They also lost their second game, against Jamaica, by 23 runs. They gained their first win of the tournament in their third match, posting 165/7 from their 60 overs against International XI before restricting their opposition to 151/8 to win by 14 runs. Young England batter Geraldine Davies made 65, whilst Julia Greenwood and Rosalind Heggs took 3 wickets apiece. This would prove to be Young England's only win of the tournament, however, as they went on to lose to Trinidad and Tobago, England, and New Zealand in their final three matches. Overall, the side finished bottom of the seven-team group. Young England bowler Rosalind Heggs was the leading wicket-taker in the competition, with 12 wickets at an average of 14.91.

== Tournament history ==
=== Women's Cricket World Cup ===
- 1973: 7th

== Records ==
=== One-Day Internationals ===
- Highest team total: 174/6 vs New Zealand, 21 July 1973.
- Highest individual score: 65, Geraldine Davies vs International XI, 7 July 1973.
- Best innings bowling: 4/8, Glynis Hullah vs Jamaica, 30 June 1973.

Most ODI runs for Young England Women
Player	Runs	Average	Career span
Geraldine Davies	157	31.40	1973
Megan Lear	81	16.20	1973
Shirley Ellis	62	12.40	1973
Rosalind Heggs	55	9.16	1973
Susan Goatman	54	9.00	1973

Most ODI wickets for Young England Women
Player	Wickets	Average	Career span
Rosalind Heggs	12	14.91	1973
Julia Greenwood	9	13.66	1973
Glynis Hullah	8	14.62	1973
Yvonne Golland	2	31.50	1973
Shirley Ellis	2	51.50	1973

ODI record versus other nations
Opponent	M	W	L	T	NR	First	Last
Australia	1	0	1	0	0	1973	1973
England	1	0	1	0	0	1973	1973
International XI	1	1	0	0	0	1973	1973
Jamaica	1	0	1	0	0	1973	1973
New Zealand	1	0	1	0	0	1973	1973
Trinidad and Tobago	1	0	1	0	0	1973	1973
Total	6	1	5	0	0	1973	1973

== See also ==
- List of Young England women ODI cricketers
- England women's cricket team
