= England women's cricket team =

England
- Association: England and Wales Cricket Board

Personnel
- Captain: Nat Sciver-Brunt
- Coach: Charlotte Edwards

International Cricket Council
- ICC status: Full member (1909)
- ICC region: Europe
| ICC Rankings | Current | Best-ever |
| ODI | 2nd | 2nd (1 Oct 2015) |
| T20I | 2nd | 2nd |

Tests
- First Test: v Australia at the Brisbane Exhibition Ground, Brisbane; 28–31 December 1934
- Last Test: v India at Lord's, London; 10–13 July 2026
| Tests | Played | Won/Lost |
| Total | 103 | 21/18 (64 draws) |
| This year | 1 | 0/1 (0 draws) |

One Day Internationals
- First ODI: v International XI at County Cricket Ground, Hove; 23 June 1973
- Last ODI: v Ireland at New Road, Worcester; 6 September 2026
| ODIs | Played | Won/Lost |
| Total | 424 | 251/156 (2 ties, 15 no results) |
| This year | 6 | 4/1 (0 ties, 1 no result) |
- World Cup appearances: 11 (first in 1973)
- Best result: Champions (1973, 1993, 2009, 2017)

T20 Internationals
- First T20I: v New Zealand at County Cricket Ground, Hove; 5 August 2004
- Last T20I: v Australia at Lord's, London; 5 July 2026
| T20Is | Played | Won/Lost |
| Total | 233 | 167/61 (3 ties, 2 no results) |
| This year | 13 | 10/3 (0 ties, 0 no results) |
- T20 World Cup appearances: 8 (first in 2009)
- Best result: Champions (2009)
- Official website: www.ecb.co.uk/england/women
Test kit
ODI kit
T20I kit
- As of 6 September 2026

The England women's cricket team represents England and Wales in international women's cricket. Since 1998, they have been governed by the England and Wales Cricket Board (ECB), having been previously governed by the Women's Cricket Association. England is a Full Member of the International Cricket Council, with Test, One Day International (ODI) and Twenty20 International (T20I) status.

They played in the first ever Women's Test match in 1934, against Australia, which they won by 9 wickets. The two teams now compete regularly for The Women's Ashes. They played in the first Women's Cricket World Cup in 1973, winning the tournament on home soil, and have gone on to win the World Cup three more times, in 1993, 2009 and 2017. After their 2017 triumph, they were awarded the BBC Sports Team of the Year Award. They played in the first ever Twenty20 International in 2005, against New Zealand, and won the inaugural ICC Women's World Twenty20 in 2009, but despite being in the final on several occasions since they have not repeated that triumph.

== History ==
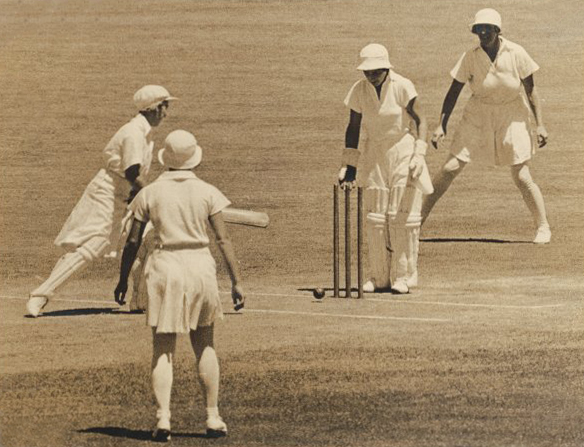
Australia vs England in the second women's Test match in Sydney, 1935

=== The pioneers ===
England were a part of the first Women's Test series, as their team led by Betty Archdale touring Australia in the summer of 1934–35, three years after the Bodyline tour by the men. The team and their captain received "warm" responses from the Australian crowds. Winning both the first two Tests and drawing the third, England won the first women's test series, and also beat New Zealand by an innings and 337 runs on the way home, where Betty Snowball contributed an innings of 189, which was to remain a women's Test record for half a century. However, their leading player, and one of the best-known women cricketers of the era, was the allrounder Myrtle Maclagan. She scored the first ever century in a woman's Test match on 7 January 1935.

Two years later, England suffered their first Test defeat, at the hands of Australia at Northampton. As Australia made their inaugural tour, an England team including seven debutantes conceded 300 on the first day, and despite bowling Australia out for 102 in the second innings they lost by 31 runs. England recovered to take the second Test after a first-innings 115 from Myrtle Maclagan, who also took five wickets opening the bowling, and the third Test was drawn to ensure a 1–1 series tie.

=== Losing the Ashes ===
England began playing women's Test cricket again in 1948–49, when they toured Australia for a three-Test match series. An England team with seven debutantes, lost the Women's Ashes to Australia after losing the first Test and drawing the final two. Two of their eleven made half-centuries on tour: Molly Hide, who also batted out the third day of the final Test to make England's only century in Australia that season to draw the game, and Myrtle Maclagan, who hit 77 in the second Test. Both had Test experience from before the War. Maclagan was also England's leading wicket-taker on tour, with nine wickets, ahead of Hide and Mary Johnson who took six each. However, England still beat New Zealand in their only Test one month after the conclusion of the Ashes.

In 1951, Australia toured England for the first time in 14 years. After drawing the first Test at Scarborough, England gained a lead of 38 on first innings after Mary Duggan's five wickets, and set a target of 159, larger than any score in the previous three innings, and a record of that time. Australia were 131 for eight after Duggan took four more wickets, but England conceded 29 runs for the ninth wicket. Thus, they surrendered the Ashes again, despite winning the final Test by 137 runs after another Duggan nine-wicket-haul to draw the series at 1–1.

England's next international series involved a visit from New Zealand in 1954. England won the first Test, despite giving up a deficit of 10 runs on first innings, but drew the second and third; the third Test saw a whole day's play lost to rain. Excluding one-offs, this was England's first series win since their inaugural series.

England went on tour of Australasia once again in 1957–58, nine years after their previous tour, but by now Mary Duggan had taken over as captain. For a change, they began against New Zealand, where they drew both Tests; despite Duggan's five-for in the final innings, New Zealand closed on 203 for nine after being set 228 to win. They then moved on to Australia, where their series began with an abandoned match at North Sydney Oval in February, and the second Test at St Kilda had the first day rained off. When the teams came in to bat, though, Duggan set a women's Test record; she claimed seven Australian batters, all for single-digit scores, and in 14.5 overs she conceded six runs, bettering Maclagan's previous best of seven for 10. The record stood for 38 years. However, Betty Wilson replied with seven for seven as England were bowled out for 35, three short of Australia's total, and then made a second-innings hundred as Australia set a target of 206 in 64 overs. England lost eight wickets for 76, but still managed the draw, while Wilson claimed four wickets to become the first Test player to score a hundred and take ten wickets in a match.

Wilson also hit a hundred in the third Test at Adelaide, but Cecilia Robinson replied with a hundred of her own, lasting into the final day's play. With Ruth Westbrook and Edna Barker also scoring half-centuries, England gained a first-innings lead, but Australia batted out to make 78 for two and draw the game. The fourth Test was also drawn; England trailed by 27 going into the final day, but Robinson carried her bat to 96 not out as England survived 102.5 overs and set Australia a target of 162. England only got one wicket in reply, however, to draw the game.

=== Unbeaten 1960s ===
After the 1950s, where England had lost two and won two Tests, England went through the 1960s without losing any of their 14 Tests, with the majority, ten, drawn. Their first series were against Test debutantes South Africa. Once again, the series had a majority of draws, but an England side captained by 23-year-old Helen Sharpe won the series 1–0 after claiming the third Test at Durban by eight wickets. South Africa gained first innings leads in the first and last Test, however, but followed on in the second Test which was affected by rain.

In 1963 England took what was to be their last series win over Australia for 42 years. In the first Test, England made 91 for three in the final innings, but in the second match at the North Marine Road Ground in Scarborough England were 97 behind with nine second-innings wickets in hand by the close of the second day. Wickets fell steadily throughout the third day, and England fell from 79 for four to 91 for nine; however, Eileen Vigor and June Bragger held on for the tenth wicket to draw the game. Three weeks later, the teams met for the third and final decider at The Oval, and captain Mary Duggan, in her last Test, scored her second Test century as England declared on 254 for eight. Australia replied with 205, then took two English wickets on the second day, and were set a target of 202. With Duggan and Anne Sanders doing the brunt of the bowling, England took the first nine wickets for 133, before Australia's No. 10 and 11 built a partnership. However, Edna Barker was brought on as the seventh bowler of the innings, and with her fourteenth ball she had Marjorie Marvell lbw to win the game for England.

Rachael Heyhoe-Flint took over the captaincy for the 1966 series against New Zealand, and made her first Test century in her very first Test as captain. New Zealand batted out the match losing twelve wickets, however, and the first Test was drawn. In the second, New Zealand recovered from a first innings deficit to set England a target of 157, which resulted in another draw, and in the third Test England were five for three overnight on the second day, trailing by 65. Another wicket was lost on the third morning, but England held on for 100 overs and set New Zealand 84 in nine overs to win the series. England conceded 35 and could not take a wicket, but still drew the game and the series 0 – 0.

England next went on an Oceanian tour in 1968–69, defending the Ashes successfully after another 0 – 0 draw. Debutante Enid Bakewell, aged 28, made a hundred in the first Test, but Australia declared 69 ahead, and England batted out the third day to make 192 for seven; in the second Test Edna Barker registered a hundred, and England set a target of 181, but could only take five wickets for 108 in Australia's final innings. The decider at Sydney also saw a declaration, from Australia, who made 210 for three declared in their second innings, but England lost only six wickets in the chase to draw again.

In New Zealand, the same procedure followed: Bakewell scored her second Test hundred and took five wickets in the first drawn Test, where the third innings lasted 4.4 overs before the game was called off as a draw. She followed that up with 114 and eight wickets in the second Test, where England bowled out New Zealand for 186 on the final day, and chased 173 in 42.3 overs after 66 not out in the second innings from Bakewell, and in the third Test New Zealand were bowled out for 214 in 68.3 overs after being set 252 to win. Bakewell made 412 runs in her five Test innings in New Zealand, and coupled that with 19 wickets, and headed both the runs and wickets tally. On the entire tour, also including matches against other opposition, Bakewell scored 1,031 runs and took 118 wickets.

=== First World Cup ===
West Indies had not been granted Test status yet, but England went on two tours there in 1969–70 and 1970–71, sponsored by Sir Jack Hayward. Hayward had received letters from England captain Heyhoe-Flint asking for sponsorship, and after a conversation between the two in 1971, Hayward and the Women's Cricket Association agreed to organise the inaugural Women's World Cup, which was to become the first World Cup in cricket. England fielded two sides: a Young England side, who were bowled out for 57 by Australia in the first Women's One-day International, and the senior side. In addition, three English women, Audrey Disbury, Wendy Williams and Pamela Crain played for the International XI.

Young England won one game, against International XI, while the full-strength England side won four of their first five games. In the match with New Zealand, rain forced them off after 15 overs, at 34 for one needing 71 from the last 20, and New Zealand were declared winners on "average run rate". New Zealand were not a threat, however, having lost with two balls to spare against the International XI and by 35 runs against Australia. With the match between Australia and the International XI rained off, Australia went into the final game with a one-point advantage on England, but in "gloriously" fair weather at Edgbaston Enid Bakewell scored her second century of the tournament, and England tallied 273 for three. Bakewell also bowled 12 overs for 28, taking the wicket of top-scorer Jackie Potter, as England limited Australia to 187 in their 60 overs and won the World Cup.

=== 2005 ===
In the 2005 World Cup, England lost in the semi-finals to eventual winners Australia. However, England went on to win the two-Test series against Australia 1–0, claiming the Women's Ashes for the first time in 42 years. The One-Day series between the two sides was closely contested, with Australia winning the final match to take the series 3–2. The Women's team participated in the parade and celebrations held in Trafalgar Square alongside the victorious men's team.

With Clare Connor missing the 2005 winter tour, fluent middle order batsman Charlotte Edwards was named captain for the series against Sri Lanka and India, with England easily winning the two ODIs against Sri Lanka before drawing the one Test against India while losing the 5-match ODI series 4–1. Connor announced her retirement from international cricket in 2006, with Edwards now the official captain for the series against India in England.

=== 2008 ===
Despite being written off as underdogs before the Australian tour began, England drew the one-day international series against Australia, two all, and retained the Ashes with a six wicket victory in the one-off test match at Bowral. Isa Guha took nine wickets in the test match, and won the player of the match award, while long serving middle order batsman, Claire Taylor scored two gritty fifties. Captain Charlotte Edwards hit the winning runs, as she had at the Sydney Cricket Ground in her 100th one day international.

=== 2009 ===
England won the 2009 World Cup, held in Australia, defeating New Zealand by 4 wickets in the final at North Sydney Oval. They lost only one match in the tournament, against Australia, while they defeated India, Pakistan, New Zealand, Sri Lanka and the West Indies. Claire Taylor was the most prolific batsman in the tournament and Laura Marsh the most successful bowler. Vice captain Nicki Shaw, restored to the team only due to injury to Jenny Gunn, took 4 wickets and hit a vital 17 not out to win the man of the match award in the final. Caroline Atkins, Sarah Taylor and captain Charlotte Edwards were prolific with the bat while bowlers Holly Colvin and Katherine Brunt dominated with the ball. Five England players were named in the composite ICC team of the tournament. Claire Taylor was named one of Wisden's five cricketers of the year, the first woman to be honoured with the award in its 120-year history.

England underlined their dominance of the women's game with victory in the inaugural Twenty/20 World Championship at Lords. After qualifying top of their preliminary group, defeating India, Sri Lanka and Pakistan, they overcame a formidable Australian total in the semi-final, thanks to Claire Taylor's unbeaten 76. A spell of 3 for 6 by fast bowler Katherine Brunt saw New Zealand dismissed for 85 in the final at Lords and Player of the Series Claire Taylor saw England to victory with an unbeaten 39. England completed the season by retaining the Ashes with a draw in the one-off test at New Road, Worcestershire thanks to the fast bowling of Katherine Brunt, who took seven wickets, and dogged defensive batting from Beth Morgan, who batted nearly eight hours in the match.

=== 2012 World Twenty20 ===
Heading into the 2012 World Twenty20 in Sri Lanka, England were considered favourites after an 18-month unbeaten streak that only ended in the weeks before the tournament, in a series against the West Indies which England won 4–1. England were forced into a late change for the tournament during this series, when Susie Rowe fractured her thumb and was replaced by the uncapped Amy Jones. England were grouped with Australia, India and Pakistan in Group A, following their group stage exit in the previous World Twenty20.

England began with a win over Pakistan, although they were somewhat unconvincing. After an opening stand of 102 between captain Charlotte Edwards and Laura Marsh, England only scored 31 runs in their final 7 overs to finish 133–6. Pakistan never really threatened to cause an upset, and were bowled out for 90 including 4-9 for Holly Colvin. However, Danielle Wyatt suffered an ankle injury whilst bowling and this limited her bowling input for the remainder of the group stage. Any unease at England's first performance was quashed with a thumping nine wicket win over India in their second game, which saw them qualify for the knockout stage. India were limited to 116-6 off their 20 overs, before another impressive stand of 78 from Edwards and Marsh ended the game as a contest, with Edwards ending on 50* and winning the player of the match award.

England's final group game was against Australia, and whilst both sides had already qualified, the game was seen as a good chance to get a psychological advantage before a potential final match-up. Australia posted an impressive 144–5, despite an economical performance from Katherine Brunt, thanks to scores of 39 from Meg Lanning and 38 from Lisa Sthalekar. This time Marsh departed early, bringing Sarah Taylor to the crease, although England continued to struggle to keep with the run rate, losing both Edwards and Arran Brindle. However, Wyatt's arrival at the crease saw a partnership of 65 off 33 balls, leading England's to a comfortable victory, Taylor ending on 65* and Wyatt on 33*. England carried this momentum into their semi-final with New Zealand, Lydia Greenway effecting a run out in the first over to dismiss New Zealand captain Suzie Bates, and thereafter New Zealand were only able to post a disappointing effort of 93–8. England comfortably scored the runs, with contributions from Edwards, Taylor (who finished not out for the third successive game) and Greenway, and reached their second World Twenty20 final.

The final took place on 7 October, between England and Australia in Colombo. England maintained their tactic of bowling first when Edwards won the toss, although it was Australia who made the far better start, scoring 47 off their first 6 overs during the powerplay without losing a wicket. Lanning and Alyssa Healy were dismissed soon afterwards, with Colvin taking 2-21 off her 4 overs, but Jess Cameron scored 45 off 34 balls. Although after Cameron's dismissal Australia only scored 23 runs off their final 23 balls, they posted a competitive score of 142–4. England were unable to match Australia's fast start, and with the run rate climbing, Australia were able to take crucial wickets at important times, Ellyse Perry making a huge impact in having Taylor caught behind and taking the catches for both Edwards and Greenway's dismissals. When Brunt was bowled by Jess Jonassen first ball of the 17th over, England needed 42 off 23 balls with just 3 wickets left. Despite valiant efforts from Jenny Gunn and Danielle Hazell, Hazell was unable to hit the final ball of the match for six off Erin Osborne, and Australia won by 4 runs.

Despite the defeat, Charlotte Edwards ended as the highest run scorer across the tournament, and was thus named player of the tournament. She was joined in the team of the tournament by Laura Marsh, Sarah Taylor and Katherine Brunt.

=== 2013 Women's World Cup ===
Following on from the disappointment of not winning the world Twenty20, England headed to India for the 2013 Women's Cricket World Cup, defending their 2009 title. England added Georgia Elwiss to their squad from the World Twenty20, and were in Group A with Sri Lanka, West Indies and hosts India. England's tournament got off to a disastrous start, losing a thrilling match to the unfancied Sri Lanka. Sarah Taylor, Laura Marsh and Anya Shrubsole all missed the game injured, and Sri Lanka won the toss and inserted England to bat. The toss would prove crucial many times in this tournament, as the early start times meant that batting during the first hour was extremely difficult, and so it proved in this match, with Charlotte Edwards, Danielle Wyatt and Lydia Greenway all out within the first eight overs. Arran Brindle (31) and Heather Knight (38) led the recovery, but as soon as England had gained the ascendancy they were both dismissed. It was left to vice-captain Jenny Gunn and debutant Amy Jones to get England to a defendable score, and they did, with Gunn making 52 and Jones 41. Some late hitting from Katherine Brunt and Danielle Hazell lifted England to 238–8, and it seemed as though the disaster the early wickets had promised had been averted. Sri Lanka however pulled off a stunning victory, Chamari Athapaththu scoring 62, and supported by Mendis and Siriwardene, put Sri Lanka in an extremely strong position. Brunt and Elwiss struck back for England, before a brutal 56 from Eshani Lokusuriyage took Sri Lanka to within a run of victory. She was run out in the final over, but Dilani Manodara hit the final ball of the match from Elwiss for six as Sri Lanka won by just one wicket, their first every victory over England.

Whilst this result did not put England's chances of qualification in too much danger, it highlighted potential weaknesses for other sides to exploit. Taylor, Marsh and Shrubsole all returned for the second game against India, although England again lost the toss and found themselves batting. Whilst Goswami dismissed Wyatt cheaply, Edwards and Taylor both survived and then prospered. Taylor was run out for 35, but Edwards carried on, and reached her 7th ODI hundred, and when Brindle added 37*, England had reached 272–8. Despite 107* from Harmanpreet Kaur, England won by 32 runs, with the outstanding Brunt taking 4-29 from her 9 overs, and Holly Colvin's miserly spell where she conceded just 29 runs from her 10 overs. England's final game was against the West Indies, with only the winner guaranteed a spot in the super sixes. West Indies won the toss and surprisingly elected to bat, which soon backfired against Brunt and Shrubsole. West Indies were reduced to 31-6 and ended 101 all out, Shrubsole taking 4-21 and Brindle 3–0, although this was not achieved without worry for England as Edwards left the field ill and Brunt injured herself celebrating the wicket of Deandra Dottin. England achieved the target with 40 from Wyatt, taking them through to the next stage. However, Sri Lanka then gained another shock victory, over hosts India, taking them through along with England and West Indies. This result meant England carried through one win and one defeat instead of two wins, which would soon prove crucial.

England's first game in the Super Sixes was against Australia, and the game began well for England, who won the toss having found out Australia would be missing their star pace bowler, Ellyse Perry, injured. Brunt and Shrubsole soon reduced Australia to 32–5, taking full advantage of early swing, before Lisa Sthalekar and Sarah Coyte managed to get Australia to a poor but not wholly uncompetitive 147 all out. England began poorly, and found themselves 39–6, including a second successive first ball duck for Taylor. Greenway made a gutsy 49, but her dismissal seemingly marked the end of the match. England needed 34 when their last pair of Holly Colvin and Anya Shrubsole came together, but they took England to within three runs of victory, before Erin Osborne crucially dismissed Colvin to win the game for Australia. England now needed other results to go in their favour to reach the final, but responded superbly, bowling South Africa out for just 77 in their next match, with Shrubsole again to the fore, taking outstanding figures of 10-5-17-5, and Wyatt picking up three cheap wickets. England achieved the target in just 9.3 overs, boosting their net run rate, vital should they finish level on points with another team.

England went into their last Super Sixes match against New Zealand knowing that if Australia beat the West Indies and they beat New Zealand, they would reach the final. However, during the early stages of the match news came through that West Indies had staged a remarkable comeback victory over Australia, meaning those two teams would contest the final, and England and New Zealand would finish 3rd and 4th. The game lost some of its intensity after the news came through, but England posted 266–6, with Taylor scoring 88 and Edwards 54. New Zealand appeared to be well on the way to victory at 145–1, but good spells of bowling from Gunn and Colvin saw New Zealand collapse and England win by 15 runs. The same sides then contested the 3rd/4th place playoff, where the once again impressive Colvin helped limit New Zealand to 220–8. England successfully chased this target down to finish 3rd in the tournament, with Taylor, Greenway and Brindle supporting a match winning hundred from Edwards, who became the first woman to score 5,000 runs in ODIs as she finished 106*. Edwards, Brunt, Colvin and Shrubsole all were named in the team of the tournament, giving England the most representatives with four.

=== 2013 Ashes victory ===
England's summer began with a change in coaching structure, with the coach of the previous five years Mark Lane leaving, to be replaced by Paul Shaw. England began the summer with a 2 ODI, 2 Twenty20 international series against Pakistan, which was used as a chance to give some of the fringe and younger players international experience due to the need to expand the squad along with some residual injuries to senior players. England won the ODI series 2-0 and tied the Twenty20 series 1–1, with international debuts for Natalie Sciver, Lauren Winfield and Natasha Farrant.

The Ashes began with the four-day Test match at Wormsley, with Australia making strong progress on the first day, reaching 243–3 at the close on a slow pitch. This was extended to 331-6 declared before lunch on the second day, Sarah Elliott completing her maiden Test century. Arran Brindle departed early, but a flowing fifty partnership from Heather Knight and Sarah Taylor put England in the ascendancy. Taylor was dismissed by Holly Ferling as England dramatically slumped to 113-6 and were in sudden danger of being forced to follow on. That they did not was due to a partnership of 156 between Knight and Laura Marsh, which ultimately saw England cede only a lead of 17 to Australia. Knight, in only her second Test, scored 157 in nearly seven hours of chanceless batting, winning her the player of the match award. Marsh's innings, 55 off 304 balls and 343 minutes, was one of the slowest international fifties recorded but helped England escape from the trouble they were in. From the close of England's 1st innings the match petered out into a draw, the slow pitch preventing either side from forcing victory.

With the Ashes now contested across all three formats, the drawn Test meant that England would have to win the combined ODI and Twenty20 match series at least 8-4 (2 points for a win) to win back the Ashes. They began badly in the first ODI at Lords, where Australia batted first and scored 203–8, due to good performances from Katherine Brunt and Marsh with the ball. England began well if a little slowly but faded against the Australian spinners, as despite 61 from Edwards, they slumped to a 27 run defeat. England came back strongly in the second ODI at Hove, batting first and making 256–6 in their 50 overs. Edwards led the way with her 6th consecutive ODI fifty, with all of the top six making at least 26. Brunt and Anya Shrubsole then dismissed both openers, including the dangerous Meg Lanning for zero, and despite 81 from Jess Cameron, England won by 51 runs, although Marsh injured her shoulder and missed the remainder of the series. The final ODI again took place at Hove, and after rain reduced the game to 36 overs a side, Australia scored an imposing 203–4, led by Lanning's 64. The Australia innings was notable for the remarkable dismissal of Australian captain Jodie Fields, who was brilliantly caught one-handed by Taylor as Fields attempted to reverse sweep Danielle Hazell. England chased down this target impressively, as after Edwards early dismissal, Knight and Taylor combined for a partnership of 126 in 18 overs. They fell for 69 and 64 respectively, but Sciver and Gunn saw England home and into a series lead.

The Twenty20 series began at a packed Chelmsford, and England posted 146–4, owing much to Taylor, who made 77. Australia's reply never got started until some late hitting from Perry and Haynes, but England won by 15 runs despite to loss of Shrubsole to injury to move within one victory of winning the series. In the next game at the Rose Bowl, Australia batted first and made 127–7, Hazell bowling well to take 2-11 off her 4 overs. England's reply began poorly when they slumped to 9–3, but Lydia Greenway, who made an unbeaten 80 off 64 balls, led England to both victory in the match and series, with the number of commentators praising her innings for its quality under pressure. England then thumped a deflated Australia in the final match of the series, taking the Ashes 12–4. Australia could only manage 91-7 off their 20 overs against a very disciplined performance from England's bowlers and fielders, and after the loss of three early wickets, Greenway and Sciver saw England to a comfortable win. Knight, who tore her hamstring in the final match, collected the player of the series award.

=== 2014–present: professional era ===
In February 2014, the ECB decided to invest in the women's game providing central contracts to 18 players by May.

In October 2019, national director Clare Connor announced plans to grow all areas of the women's game, with the addition of 40 new full-time contracted players.

Due to the COVID-19 pandemic, the initial announcement of players was delayed until June 2020, where the ECB announced the first 25 of 40 players to receive the new regional retainers contracts. The split of the full 40 players will be made up of 5 players from each of the grouped 8 regions.

== Status of Wales ==
The England women's cricket team, as a part of the England and Wales Cricket Board, represents both England and Wales. Welsh cricketers such as Lynne Thomas have therefore played for England.

Cricket Wales has continually supported the ECB, and the Wales women's national cricket team effectively functions as a domestic team within the women's county cricket structure, competing in the Women's County Championship until 2019 and continuing to compete in the Women's Twenty20 Cup. Wales is included as part of the country's new regional domestic structure and is part of the Western Storm regional hub, as well as being represented by Welsh Fire in The Hundred.

The absence of a Welsh cricket team that compete internationally in men's cricket has led to a number of comments from politicians and debates within the Senedd. It is unclear, however, whether these calls extend to the women's game. Wales did compete internationally in the Women's European Championship in 2005, as the tournament was held in Wales, playing against England and three other European women's cricket sides.

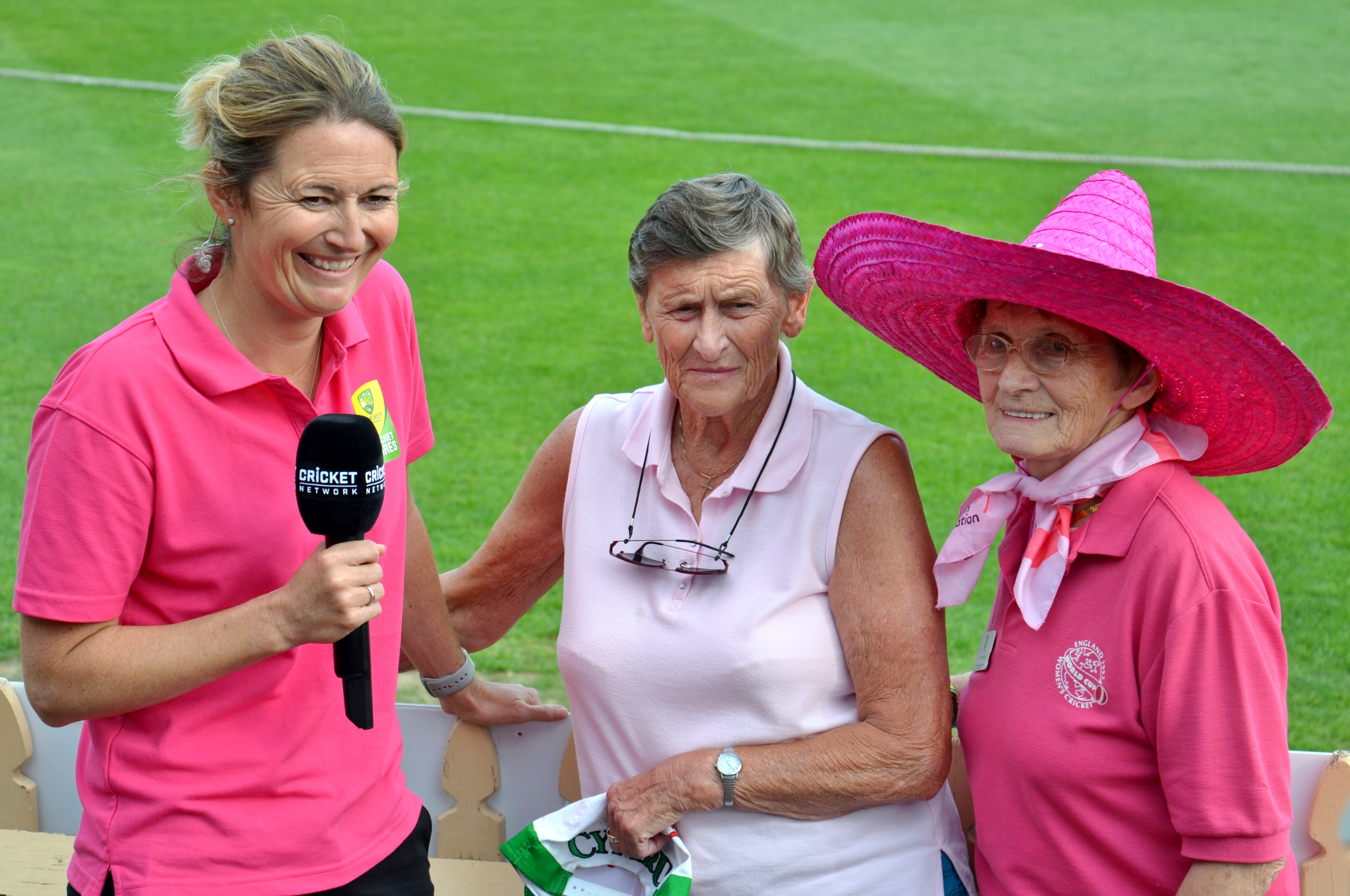
England World Cup stars (L-R): Charlotte Edwards, Lynne Thomas and Enid Bakewell, photographed at North Sydney Oval during the 2017–18 Women's Ashes Test

== Tournament history ==
A red box around the year indicates tournaments played within England

Key
| Champions |
| Runners-up |
| Semi-finals |

=== ODI World Cup ===
World Cup record
| Year | Round | Position | Played | Won | Lost | Tie | NR |
|---|---|---|---|---|---|---|---|
| (England) 1973 | Champions | 1/7 | 6 | 5 | 1 | 0 | 0 |
| (India) 1978 | Runners-up | 2/4 | 3 | 2 | 1 | 0 | 0 |
| (New Zealand) 1982 | Runners-up | 2/5 | 13 | 7 | 4 | 2 | 0 |
| (Australia) 1988 | Runners-up | 2/5 | 9 | 6 | 3 | 0 | 0 |
| (England) 1993 | Champions | 1/8 | 8 | 7 | 1 | 0 | 0 |
| (India) 1997 | Semi-finals | 3/11 | 7 | 5 | 2 | 0 | 0 |
| (New Zealand) 2000 | Group Stage | 5/8 | 7 | 3 | 4 | 0 | 0 |
| (South Africa) 2005 | Semi-finals | 4/8 | 8 | 3 | 3 | 0 | 2 |
| (Australia) 2009 | Champions | 1/8 | 7 | 6 | 1 | 0 | 0 |
| (India) 2013 | Semi-finals | 3/8 | 7 | 5 | 2 | 0 | 0 |
| (England) 2017 | Champions | 1/8 | 9 | 8 | 1 | 0 | 0 |
| (New Zealand) 2022 | Runners-up | 2/8 | 9 | 5 | 4 | 0 | 0 |
| (India) 2025 | Semi-finals | 4/8 | 8 | 5 | 2 | 0 | 1 |
| Total | 4 Title | - | 101 | 67 | 29 | 2 | 3 |

=== T20 World Cup ===
T20 World Cup record
| Year | Round | Position | Played | Won | Lost | Tie | NR |
|---|---|---|---|---|---|---|---|
| (England) 2009 | Champions | 1/8 | 5 | 5 | 0 | 0 | 0 |
| (Cricket West Indies) 2010 | Group Stage | 5/8 | 3 | 1 | 2 | 0 | 0 |
| (Sri Lanka) 2012 | Runners-up | 2/8 | 5 | 4 | 1 | 0 | 0 |
| (Bangladesh) 2014 | Runners-up | 2/10 | 6 | 4 | 2 | 0 | 0 |
| (India) 2016 | Semi-finals | 4/10 | 5 | 4 | 1 | 0 | 0 |
| (Cricket West Indies) 2018 | Runners-up | 2/10 | 6 | 3 | 2 | 0 | 1 |
| (Australia) 2020 | Semi-finals | 4/10 | 5 | 3 | 1 | 0 | 1 |
| (South Africa) 2023 | Semi-finals | 3/10 | 5 | 4 | 1 | 0 | 0 |
| (United Arab Emirates) 2024 | Group Stage | 6/10 | 4 | 3 | 1 | 0 | 0 |
| (England) 2026 | Runners-up | 2/12 | 7 | 6 | 1 | 0 | 0 |
| Total | 1 Title | - | 51 | 37 | 12 | 0 | 2 |

=== Commonwealth Games ===
Commonwealth Games record
| Year | Round | Position | GP | W | L | T | NR |
|---|---|---|---|---|---|---|---|
| (England) 2022 | Medal round | 4/8 | 5 | 3 | 2 | 0 | 0 |
| Total | 0 Title | - | 5 | 3 | 2 | 0 | 0 |

=== European Championship ===
- 1989: Winners
- 1990: Winners
- 1991: Winners
- 1995: Winners
- 1999: Winners
- 2001: Runners-up (England Under-19s)
- 2005: Winners (Development Squad)
- 2007: Winners (Development Squad)

(Note: England sent a Development Squad to every European Championship tournament, but it was only specifically referred to as such in 2005 & 2007). At the 2001 edition of the tournament, England was represented by the national under-19 team.)

== Honours ==
- Women's World Cup:
  - Champions (4): 1973, 1993, 2009, 2017
  - Runners-up (4): 1978, 1982, 1988, 2022
- Women's T20 World Cup:
  - Champions (1): 2009
  - Runners-up (4): 2012, 2014, 2018, 2026

== Current international rankings ==
The ICC ranking teams by ODI and T20I performance. They do not rank women's teams for Test cricket.

ICC Women's ODI Team Rankings
| Team | Matches | Points | Rating |
|---|---|---|---|
| Australia | 28 | 4,565 | 163 |
| England | 29 | 3,653 | 126 |
| India | 30 | 3,712 | 124 |
| South Africa | 36 | 3,614 | 100 |
| New Zealand | 24 | 2,312 | 96 |
| Sri Lanka | 24 | 2,133 | 89 |
| Bangladesh | 21 | 1,537 | 73 |
| Pakistan | 26 | 1,902 | 73 |
| West Indies | 29 | 2,085 | 72 |
| Ireland | 25 | 1,120 | 45 |
| Scotland | 9 | 393 | 44 |
| Netherlands | 5 | 208 | 42 |
| Thailand | 7 | 248 | 35 |
| Zimbabwe | 22 | 335 | 15 |
| United Arab Emirates | 8 | 81 | 10 |
| Papua New Guinea | 12 | 37 | 3 |
Source: ICC Women's ODI Team Rankings, 30 September 2026

ICC Women's T20I Team Rankings
| Team | Matches | Points | Rating |
|---|---|---|---|
| Australia | 28 | 8,151 | 291 |
| England | 38 | 10,504 | 276 |
| India | 49 | 12,955 | 264 |
| New Zealand | 32 | 7,966 | 249 |
| South Africa | 43 | 10,588 | 246 |
| West Indies | 36 | 8,572 | 238 |
| Sri Lanka | 45 | 10,702 | 238 |
| Pakistan | 41 | 8,675 | 212 |
| Ireland | 42 | 8,520 | 203 |
| Bangladesh | 43 | 8,371 | 195 |
| Scotland | 38 | 6,373 | 168 |
| Thailand | 65 | 9,961 | 153 |
| Papua New Guinea | 32 | 4,542 | 142 |
| Netherlands | 49 | 6,855 | 140 |
| United Arab Emirates | 49 | 6,704 | 137 |
| Zimbabwe | 43 | 5,177 | 120 |
| Uganda | 54 | 6,056 | 112 |
| Namibia | 46 | 5,043 | 110 |
| United States | 28 | 2,741 | 98 |
| Tanzania | 38 | 3,607 | 95 |
Source: ICC Women's T20I Team Rankings, 7 October 2026

== Current squad ==
This lists all the active players who are contracted to or have played for England in the past year (since 6 September 2026) and the forms in which they have played or were named in the latest squad in any of the forms. Uncapped players are listed in italics.

Key

- No = Shirt number
- Con = Contract type (Central / Skills)

| Name | Age | Batting style | Bowling style | Domestic team | Con | Forms | S/N | Captaincy | Last Test | Last ODI | Last T20I |
Batters
| Maia Bouchier | 27 | Right-handed | Right-arm medium | Hampshire | C | Test, ODI, T20I | 14 | | (India) 2026 | (Ireland) 2026 | (New Zealand) 2026 |
| Sophia Dunkley | 28 | Right-handed | Right-arm leg break | Surrey | C | ODI, T20I | 47 | | (Australia) 2025 | (Ireland) 2026 | (New Zealand) 2026 |
| Emma Lamb | 28 | Right-handed | Right-arm off break | Lancashire | S | ODI | 6 | | (Australia) 2023 | (New Zealand) 2026 | (New Zealand) 2021 |
| Danni Wyatt-Hodge | 35 | Right-handed | Right-arm off break | Surrey | C | ODI, T20I | 28 | | (Australia) 2025 | (South Africa) 2025 | (Australia) 2026 |
All-rounders
| Alice Capsey | 22 | Right-handed | Right-arm off break | Surrey | C | Test, ODI, T20I | 64 | | (India) 2026 | (Ireland) 2026 | (Australia) 2026 |
| Charlie Dean | 25 | Right-handed | Right-arm off break | Somerset | C | ODI, T20I | 24 | Vice-Captain | (South Africa) 2024 | (Ireland) 2026 | (Australia) 2026 |
| Danielle Gibson | 25 | Right-handed | Right-arm medium | Somerset | C | ODI, T20I | 66 | | – | (Ireland) 2026 | (Australia) 2026 |
| Jodi Grewcock | 21 | Left-handed | Right-arm leg break | Essex | — | ODI | 51 | | – | (Ireland) 2026 | – |
| Freya Kemp | 21 | Left-handed | Left-arm medium | Hampshire | C | ODI, T20I | 73 | | – | (Ireland) 2026 | (Australia) 2026 |
| Ryana MacDonald-Gay | 22 | Right-handed | Right-arm medium | Surrey | S | ODI | 92 | | (Australia) 2025 | (Ireland) 2026 | (Ireland) 2024 |
| Charis Pavely | 21 | Left-handed | Slow left-arm orthodox | Warwickshire | — | ODI | 56 | | – | – | (Ireland) 2024 |
| Nat Sciver-Brunt | 34 | Right-handed | Right-arm medium | The Blaze | C | Test, ODI, T20I | 39 | Captain | (India) 2026 | (South Africa) 2025 | (Australia) 2026 |
| Mady Villiers | 28 | Right-handed | Right-arm off break | Durham | — | Test, ODI | 22 | | (India) 2026 | (Ireland) 2026 | (Ireland) 2024 |
Wicket-keepers
| Kira Chathli | 27 | Right-handed | — | Surrey | — | ODI | – | | – | – | – |
| Amy Jones | 33 | Right-handed | — | The Blaze | C | Test, ODI, T20I | 40 | | (India) 2026 | (New Zealand) 2026 | (Australia) 2026 |
| Eleanor Threlkeld | 27 | Right-handed | — | Lancashire | — | Test | – | | – | – | – |
Pace bowlers
| Emily Arlott | 28 | Right-handed | Right-arm medium | Warwickshire | S | ODI | 37 | | – | (Pakistan) 2025 | (India) 2025 |
| Lauren Bell | 25 | Right-handed | Right-arm fast-medium | Hampshire | C | Test, ODI, T20I | 63 | | (India) 2026 | (New Zealand) 2026 | (Australia) 2026 |
| Lauren Filer | 25 | Right-handed | Right-arm fast | Durham | C | Test, ODI | 82 | | (India) 2026 | (Ireland) 2026 | (India) 2025 |
| Mahika Gaur | 20 | Right-handed | Left-arm medium-fast | Lancashire | C | — | 89 | | – | (Sri Lanka) 2023 | (Ireland) 2024 |
| Grace Potts | 24 | Right-handed | Right-arm medium | Lancashire | — | Test, ODI | – | | – | – | – |
| Alexa Stonehouse | 21 | Right-handed | Left-arm medium | Warwickshire | — | ODI | – | | – | – | – |
| Issy Wong | 24 | Right-handed | Right-arm fast-medium | Warwickshire | S | Test, ODI, T20I | 95 | | (India) 2026 | (Ireland) 2026 | (India) 2026 |
Spin bowlers
| Tilly Corteen-Coleman | 19 | Left-handed | Slow left-arm orthodox | Surrey | — | ODI, T20I | 21 | | — | (Ireland) 2026 | (India) 2026 |
| Sophie Ecclestone | 27 | Right-handed | Slow left-arm orthodox | Lancashire | C | Test, ODI, T20I | 19 | | (India) 2026 | (New Zealand) 2026 | (Australia) 2026 |
| Sarah Glenn | 27 | Right-handed | Right-arm leg break | Yorkshire | C | ODI | 3 | | – | (Pakistan) 2025 | (Cricket West Indies) 2025 |
| Linsey Smith | 31 | Left-handed | Slow left-arm orthodox | Hampshire | C | ODI, T20I | 50 | | – | (South Africa) 2025 | (Australia) 2026 |

== Records ==
=== Test cricket - individual records ===
Players shown in bold are still active in international cricket

==== Most matches ====
| Position | Player | Span | Matches |
|---|---|---|---|
| 1 | Jan Brittin | 1979–1998 | 27 |
| 2 | Charlotte Edwards | 1996–2015 | 23 |
| 3 | Rachael Heyhoe Flint | 1960–1979 | 22 |
| 4 | Jane Smit | 1992–2006 | 21 |
| 5 | Carole Hodges | 1984–1992 | 18 |
| 6 | Jacqueline Court | 1976–1987 | 17 |
| 6 | Mary Duggan | 1949–1963 | 17 |
| 8 | Clare Connor | 1995–2005 | 16 |
| 8 | Clare Taylor | 1995–2003 | 16 |
| 10 | Edna Barker | 1957–1969 | 15 |
| 10 | Molly Hide | 1934–1954 | 15 |
| 10 | Heather Knight | 2011–2026 | 15 |
| 10 | Karen Smithies | 1987–1999 | 15 |
| 10 | Claire Taylor | 1999–2009 | 15 |

As of 13 July 2026

==== Highest run scorer ====
| Position | Player | Span | Mat | Inns | Runs | Ave | HS | 50 | 100 |
|---|---|---|---|---|---|---|---|---|---|
| 1 | Jan Brittin | 1979–1998 | 27 | 44 | 1,935 | 49.61 | 167 | 11 | 5 |
| 2 | Charlotte Edwards | 1996–2015 | 23 | 43 | 1,676 | 44.10 | 117 | 9 | 4 |
| 3 | Rachael Heyhoe Flint | 1960–1979 | 22 | 38 | 1,594 | 45.54 | 179 | 10 | 3 |
| 4 | Carole Hodges | 1984–1992 | 18 | 31 | 1,164 | 40.13 | 158* | 6 | 2 |
| 5 | Enid Bakewell | 1968–1979 | 12 | 22 | 1,078 | 59.88 | 124 | 7 | 4 |
| 6 | Claire Taylor | 1999–2009 | 15 | 27 | 1,030 | 41.20 | 177 | 2 | 4 |
| 7 | Myrtle Maclagan | 1934–1951 | 14 | 25 | 1,007 | 41.95 | 119 | 6 | 2 |
| 8 | Heather Knight | 2011–2026 | 15 | 27 | 989 | 39.56 | 168* | 5 | 2 |
| 9 | **Nat Sciver-Brunt** | 2014– | 13 | 22 | 938 | 44.66 | 169* | 5 | 2 |
| 10 | Molly Hide | 1934–1954 | 15 | 27 | 872 | 36.33 | 124* | 5 | 2 |

As of 13 July 2026

==== Highest scores ====
| Position | Player | High score | Balls | 4s | 6s | Opponent | Date |
|---|---|---|---|---|---|---|---|
| 1 | Tammy Beaumont | 208 | 331 | 27 | 0 | Australia | 24 June 2023 |
| 2 | Betty Snowball | 189 | – | 1 | 0 | New Zealand | 16 February 1935 |
| 3 | Rachael Heyhoe Flint | 179 | – | 28 | 0 | Australia | 24 July 1976 |
| 4 | Claire Taylor | 177 | 287 | 22 | 0 | South Africa | 7 August 2003 |
| 5 | **Nat Sciver-Brunt** | 169* | 263 | 21 | 0 | South Africa | 27 June 2022 |
| 6 | Heather Knight | 168* | 294 | 17 | 1 | Australia | 27 January 2022 |
| 7 | Jan Brittin | 167 | 402 | 17 | 0 | Australia | 11 August 1998 |
| 8 | Barbara Daniels | 160 | 268 | 19 | 0 | New Zealand | 24 June 1996 |
| 9 | Carole Hodges | 158* | 323 | 21 | 0 | New Zealand | 27 July 1984 |
| 10 | Heather Knight | 157 | 338 | 20 | 0 | Australia | 11 August 2013 |

As of 13 July 2026

==== Highest wicket taker ====
| Position | Player | Span | Mat | Inns | Wkts | Ave | BBI | BBM | Econ | SR | 5 | 10 |
|---|---|---|---|---|---|---|---|---|---|---|---|---|
| 1 | Mary Duggan | 1949–1963 | 17 | 27 | 77 | 13.49 | 7–6 | 9–58 | 1.66 | 48.4 | 5 | 0 |
| 2 | Myrtle Maclagan | 1934–1951 | 14 | 27 | 60 | 15.58 | 7–10 | 7–41 | 1.63 | 57.2 | 3 | 0 |
| 3 | Katherine Sciver-Brunt | 2004–2022 | 14 | 25 | 51 | 21.52 | 6–69 | 9–111 | 2.52 | 51.1 | 3 | 0 |
| 4 | Enid Bakewell | 1968–1979 | 12 | 22 | 50 | 16.62 | 7–61 | 10–75 | 1.84 | 53.9 | 3 | 1 |
| 5 | **Sophie Ecclestone** | 2017– | 10 | 18 | 48 | 28.66 | 5–63 | 10–192 | 2.90 | 59.1 | 4 | 1 |
| 6 | Gillian McConway | 1984–1987 | 14 | 25 | 40 | 25.47 | 7–34 | 7–40 | 1.59 | 95.6 | 2 | 0 |
| 7 | Avril Starling | 1984–1986 | 11 | 21 | 37 | 24.64 | 5–36 | 7–97 | 1.99 | 74.0 | 1 | 0 |
| 8 | Molly Hide | 1934–1954 | 15 | 26 | 36 | 15.25 | 5–20 | 8–58 | 1.59 | 57.3 | 1 | 0 |
| 9 | Anne Sanders | 1954–1969 | 11 | 19 | 32 | 16.62 | 4–29 | 7–69 | 1.50 | 66.3 | 0 | 0 |
| 10 | Lucy Pearson | 1996–2004 | 12 | 20 | 30 | 29.36 | 7–51 | 11–107 | 2.40 | 73.1 | 1 | 1 |

As of 13 July 2026

==== Best bowling figures ====
| Position | Player | Figures (wickets/runs) | Opponent | Date |
|---|---|---|---|---|
| 1 | Mary Duggan | 7–6 | Australia | 21 February 1958 |
| 2 | Myrtle Maclagan | 7–10 | Australia | 28 December 1934 |
| 3 | Gillian McConway | 7–34 | India | 12 July 1986 |
| 4 | Lucy Pearson | 7–51 | Australia | 22 February 2003 |
| 5 | Enid Bakewell | 7–61 | West Indies | 1 July 1979 |
| 6 | Julia Greenwood | 6–46 | West Indies | 16 June 1979 |
| 7 | Mary Duggan | 6–55 | New Zealand | 28 November 1957 |
| 8 | Katherine Sciver-Brunt | 6–69 | Australia | 10 July 2009 |
| 9 | Gillian McConway | 6–71 | Australia | 1 August 1987 |
| 10 | Joy Partridge | 6–96 | Australia | 4 January 1935 |

As of 13 July 2026

=== ODI cricket - individual records ===
Players shown in bold are still active in international cricket

==== Most matches ====
| Position | Player | Span | Matches |
|---|---|---|---|
| 1 | Charlotte Edwards | 1997–2016 | 191 |
| 2 | Heather Knight | 2010–2026 | 160 |
| 3 | Jenny Gunn | 2004–2019 | 144 |
| 4 | Katherine Sciver-Brunt | 2005–2022 | 141 |
| 5 | Tammy Beaumont | 2009–2025 | 140 |
| 6 | **Nat Sciver-Brunt** | 2013– | 129 |
| 7 | Lydia Greenway | 2004–2016 | 126 |
| 7 | Claire Taylor | 1998–2011 | 126 |
| 7 | Sarah Taylor | 2006–2019 | 126 |
| 10 | **Danni Wyatt-Hodge** | 2010– | 120 |

As of 6 September 2026

==== Highest run scorers ====
| Position | Player | Span | Mat | Inns | Runs | Ave | HS | 50 | 100 |
|---|---|---|---|---|---|---|---|---|---|
| 1 | Charlotte Edwards | 1997–2016 | 191 | 180 | 5,992 | 38.16 | 173* | 46 | 9 |
| 2 | Tammy Beaumont | 2009–2025 | 140 | 130 | 4,738 | 40.49 | 168* | 24 | 12 |
| 3 | Heather Knight | 2010–2026 | 160 | 151 | 4,372 | 35.54 | 109 | 27 | 3 |
| 4 | **Nat Sciver-Brunt** | 2013– | 129 | 114 | 4,354 | 46.31 | 148* | 26 | 10 |
| 5 | Claire Taylor | 1998–2011 | 126 | 120 | 4,101 | 40.20 | 156* | 23 | 8 |
| 6 | Sarah Taylor | 2006–2019 | 126 | 119 | 4,056 | 38.26 | 147 | 20 | 8 |
| 7 | **Amy Jones** | 2013– | 114 | 96 | 2,689 | 32.39 | 129 | 16 | 2 |
| 8 | Lydia Greenway | 2003–2016 | 126 | 111 | 2,554 | 30.04 | 125* | 12 | 1 |
| 9 | Jan Brittin | 1979–1998 | 63 | 59 | 2,121 | 42.42 | 138* | 8 | 5 |
| 10 | **Danni Wyatt-Hodge** | 2010– | 120 | 103 | 2,074 | 23.56 | 129 | 5 | 2 |

As of 6 September 2026

==== Highest scores ====
| Position | Player | High score | Balls | 4s | 6s | SR | Opponent | Date |
|---|---|---|---|---|---|---|---|---|
| 1 | Charlotte Edwards | 173* | 155 | 19 | 0 | 111.61 | Ireland | 16 December 1997 |
| 2 | Tammy Beaumont | 168* | 144 | 20 | 0 | 116.66 | Pakistan | 27 June 2016 |
| 3 | Claire Taylor | 156* | 151 | 9 | 0 | 103.31 | India | 14 August 2006 |
| 4 | Tammy Beaumont | 150* | 139 | 16 | 1 | 107.91 | Ireland | 9 September 2024 |
| 5 | **Nat Sciver-Brunt** | 148* | 121 | 15 | 1 | 122.31 | Australia | 3 April 2022 |
| 6 | Tammy Beaumont | 148 | 145 | 22 | 1 | 102.06 | South Africa | 5 July 2017 |
| 7 | Sarah Taylor | 147 | 104 | 24 | 0 | 141.34 | South Africa | 5 July 2017 |
| 8 | Caroline Atkins | 145 | 155 | 12 | 0 | 93.54 | South Africa | 8 August 2008 |
| 9 | Barbara Daniels | 142* | 103 | 18 | 1 | 137.86 | Pakistan | 12 December 1997 |
| 10 | Charlotte Edwards | 139* | 152 | 17 | 0 | 91.44 | Netherlands | 30 November 2000 |

As of 6 September 2026

==== Highest wicket takers ====
| Position | Player | Span | Mat | Inns | Wkts | Ave | BBI | Econ | SR | 4 | 5 |
|---|---|---|---|---|---|---|---|---|---|---|---|
| 1 | Katherine Sciver-Brunt | 2005–2022 | 141 | 139 | 170 | 24.00 | 5–18 | 3.57 | 40.2 | 3 | 5 |
| 2 | **Sophie Ecclestone** | 2016– | 84 | 82 | 141 | 19.37 | 6–36 | 3.72 | 31.1 | 5 | 2 |
| 3 | Jenny Gunn | 2004–2019 | 144 | 136 | 136 | 28.10 | 5–22 | 3.88 | 43.4 | 4 | 2 |
| 4 | Laura Marsh | 2006–2019 | 103 | 102 | 129 | 26.84 | 5–15 | 3.89 | 41.3 | 3 | 1 |
| 5 | Anya Shrubsole | 2008–2022 | 86 | 85 | 106 | 26.53 | 6–46 | 4.21 | 37.7 | 4 | 2 |
| 6 | Clare Taylor | 1998–2005 | 105 | 104 | 102 | 23.95 | 4–13 | 2.85 | 50.3 | 2 | 0 |
| 7 | Isa Guha | 2001–2011 | 83 | 81 | 101 | 23.21 | 5–14 | 3.73 | 37.2 | 2 | 2 |
| 7 | Kate Cross | 2013–2025 | 76 | 75 | 101 | 24.83 | 6–30 | 4.45 | 33.5 | 3 | 3 |
| 9 | Holly Colvin | 2006–2013 | 72 | 68 | 98 | 21.80 | 4–17 | 3.58 | 36.5 | 3 | 0 |
| 10 | **Charlie Dean** | 2021– | 59 | 57 | 89 | 23.68 | 5–31 | 4.67 | 30.4 | 6 | 1 |

As of 6 September 2026

==== Best bowling figures ====
| Position | Player | Figures (wickets/runs) | Overs | Opponent | Date |
|---|---|---|---|---|---|
| 1 | Jo Chamberlain | 7–8 | 9.0 | Denmark | 19 July 1991 |
| 2 | Kate Cross | 6–30 | 9.5 | Ireland | 7 September 2024 |
| 3 | **Sophie Ecclestone** | 6–36 | 8.0 | South Africa | 31 March 2022 |
| 4 | Anya Shrubsole | 6–46 | 9.4 | India | 23 July 2017 |
| 5 | Laura Harper | 5–12 | 8.4 | Netherlands | 19 July 1999 |
| 6 | Isa Guha | 5–14 | 8.0 | West Indies | 12 July 2008 |
| 7 | Gill Smith | 5-15 | 5.3 | Denmark | 19 July 1990 |
| 7 | Laura Marsh | 5–15 | 10.0 | Pakistan | 12 March 2009 |
| 9 | Anya Shrubsole | 5–17 | 10.0 | South Africa | 10 February 2013 |
| 10 | Jo Chamberlain | 5–18 | 10.4 | Ireland | 21 July 1989 |
| 10 | Katherine Sciver-Brunt | 5–18 | 10.0 | Australia | 7 July 2011 |

As of 6 September 2026

=== Twenty20 International cricket - individual records ===
Players shown in bold are still active in international cricket

==== Most matches ====
| Position | Player | Span | Matches |
|---|---|---|---|
| 1 | **Danni Wyatt-Hodge** | 2010– | 187 |
| 2 | Heather Knight | 2010–2026 | 145 |
| 3 | **Nat Sciver-Brunt** | 2013– | 141 |
| 4 | **Amy Jones** | 2013– | 138 |
| 5 | **Sophie Ecclestone** | 2016– | 113 |
| 6 | Katherine Sciver-Brunt | 2005–2023 | 112 |
| 7 | Tammy Beaumont | 2009–2025 | 109 |
| 8 | Jenny Gunn | 2004–2018 | 104 |
| 9 | Charlotte Edwards | 2004–2016 | 95 |
| 10 | Sarah Taylor | 2006–2019 | 90 |

As of 13 July 2026

==== Highest run scorers ====
| Position | Player | Span | Mat | Inns | Runs | Ave | HS | SR | 50 | 100 | 4s | 6s |
|---|---|---|---|---|---|---|---|---|---|---|---|---|
| 1 | **Danni Wyatt-Hodge** | 2010– | 187 | 166 | 3,671 | 24.47 | 124 | 130.50 | 23 | 3 | 461 | 47 |
| 2 | **Nat Sciver-Brunt** | 2013– | 141 | 135 | 3,187 | 30.64 | 82 | 120.53 | 20 | 0 | 369 | 20 |
| 3 | Heather Knight | 2010–2026 | 145 | 128 | 2,656 | 27.66 | 108* | 121.72 | 10 | 1 | 281 | 39 |
| 4 | Charlotte Edwards | 2004–2016 | 95 | 93 | 2,605 | 32.97 | 92* | 106.93 | 12 | 0 | 338 | 10 |
| 5 | Sarah Taylor | 2006–2019 | 90 | 87 | 2,177 | 29.02 | 77 | 110.67 | 16 | 0 | 241 | 6 |
| 6 | Tammy Beaumont | 2009–2025 | 109 | 93 | 1,975 | 24.08 | 116 | 110.08 | 11 | 1 | 236 | 23 |
| 7 | **Amy Jones** | 2013– | 138 | 112 | 1,859 | 20.20 | 89 | 121.98 | 7 | 0 | 214 | 23 |
| 8 | **Sophia Dunkley** | 2018– | 81 | 69 | 1,463 | 25.66 | 81* | 123.35 | 7 | 0 | 179 | 25 |
| 9 | Lydia Greenway | 2004–2016 | 85 | 73 | 1,192 | 24.32 | 80* | 96.12 | 2 | 0 | 93 | 5 |
| 10 | **Alice Capsey** | 2022– | 58 | 52 | 1,053 | 21.93 | 82 | 121.87 | 6 | 0 | 130 | 19 |

As of 13 July 2026

==== Highest scores ====
| Position | Player | High score | Balls | 4s | 6s | SR | Opponent | Date |
|---|---|---|---|---|---|---|---|---|
| 1 | **Danni Wyatt-Hodge** | 124 | 64 | 15 | 5 | 193.75 | India | 25 March 2018 |
| 2 | Tammy Beaumont | 116 | 52 | 18 | 4 | 223.07 | South Africa | 20 June 2018 |
| 3 | Heather Knight | 108* | 66 | 13 | 4 | 163.63 | Thailand | 26 February 2020 |
| 4 | **Danni Wyatt-Hodge** | 105* | 62 | 13 | 1 | 169.35 | Sri Lanka | 12 June 2026 |
| 5 | **Danni Wyatt-Hodge** | 100 | 57 | 13 | 2 | 175.43 | Australia | 21 November 2017 |
| 6 | Tammy Beaumont | 97 | 65 | 13 | 1 | 149.23 | New Zealand | 1 September 2021 |
| 7 | Charlotte Edwards | 92* | 59 | 13 | 1 | 155.93 | Australia | 29 January 2014 |
| 8 | **Maia Bouchier** | 91 | 56 | 12 | 2 | 162.50 | New Zealand | 27 March 2024 |
| 9 | **Danni Wyatt-Hodge** | 89* | 56 | 12 | 1 | 158.92 | India | 14 July 2021 |
| 10 | **Danni Wyatt-Hodge** | 89* | 53 | 15 | 1 | 167.92 | New Zealand | 27 June 2026 |

As of 13 July 2026

==== Highest wicket takers ====
| Position | Player | Span | Mat | Inns | Wkts | Ave | BBI | Econ | SR | 4 | 5 |
|---|---|---|---|---|---|---|---|---|---|---|---|
| 1 | **Sophie Ecclestone** | 2016– | 113 | 112 | 154 | 16.44 | 4–18 | 6.03 | 16.3 | 2 | 0 |
| 2 | Katherine Sciver-Brunt | 2005–2023 | 112 | 111 | 114 | 19.19 | 4–15 | 5.57 | 20.6 | 1 | 0 |
| 3 | Anya Shrubsole | 2008–2022 | 79 | 79 | 102 | 15.55 | 5–11 | 5.95 | 15.6 | 2 | 1 |
| 4 | **Nat Sciver-Brunt** | 2013– | 141 | 117 | 90 | 23.28 | 4–15 | 6.61 | 21.1 | 2 | 0 |
| 5 | **Sarah Glenn** | 2019– | 73 | 70 | 89 | 16.48 | 4–12 | 6.05 | 16.3 | 4 | 0 |
| 6 | Danielle Hazell | 2009–2018 | 85 | 85 | 85 | 20.75 | 4–12 | 5.55 | 22.4 | 1 | 0 |
| 7 | **Charlie Dean** | 2022– | 58 | 57 | 77 | 18.32 | 4–19 | 6.94 | 15.8 | 2 | 0 |
| 8 | Jenny Gunn | 2004–2018 | 104 | 76 | 75 | 19.82 | 5–18 | 6.44 | 18.4 | 2 | 1 |
| 9 | **Lauren Bell** | 2022– | 48 | 48 | 67 | 18.86 | 4–12 | 7.25 | 15.6 | 1 | 0 |
| 10 | Laura Marsh | 2007–2019 | 67 | 66 | 64 | 20.64 | 3–12 | 5.29 | 23.3 | 0 | 0 |

As of 13 July 2026

==== Best bowling figures ====
| Position | Player | Figures (wickets/runs) | Overs | Opponent | Date |
|---|---|---|---|---|---|
| 1 | Anya Shrubsole | 5–11 | 4.0 | New Zealand | 17 February 2012 |
| 2 | Jenny Gunn | 5–18 | 4.0 | New Zealand | 22 October 2013 |
| 3 | Jenny Gunn | 4–9 | 2.0 | South Africa | 10 August 2007 |
| 3 | Holly Colvin | 4–9 | 3.4 | Pakistan | 27 September 2012 |
| 5 | **Danni Wyatt-Hodge** | 4–11 | 3.0 | South Africa | 9 May 2010 |
| 5 | Anya Shrubsole | 4–11 | 4.0 | Australia | 31 August 2015 |
| 7 | Anya Shrubsole | 4–12 | 4.0 | Pakistan | 4 September 2012 |
| 7 | Danielle Hazell | 4–12 | 4.0 | West Indies | 15 September 2012 |
| 7 | **Lauren Bell** | 4–12 | 3.0 | West Indies | 18 December 2022 |
| 7 | **Sarah Glenn** | 4–12 | 4.0 | Pakistan | 11 May 2024 |

As of 13 July 2026

== Bibliography ==
- Case, Roy (2018). The Pebble in My Shoe: An Anthology of Women's Cricket. Milton Keynes: AuthorHouse UK. ISBN 9781546299820.
- Davies, Pete (1998). Mad Dogs and English Women: The Story of England at the 6th Women's Cricket World Cup in India. London: Abacus. ISBN 0349110093.
- Duncan, Isabelle (2013). Skirting the Boundary: A History of Women's Cricket. London: The Robson Press. ISBN 9781849545464.
- Joy, Nancy (1950). Maiden Over: A Short History of Women's Cricket and A Diary of the 1948-49 Test Tour of Australia. London: Sporting Handbooks. OCLC 560082308.
- Nicholson, Rafaelle (2019). Ladies and Lords: A History of Women's Cricket in Britain. Sport, History and Culture series, no. 9. Oxford: Peter Lang. ISBN 9781788742931.
- Tossell, David (2016). Girls of Summer: An Ashes Year with the England Women's Cricket Team. Worthing, Sussex: Pitch Publishing. ISBN 9781785311352.
