= List of women's Test cricketers who have taken five wickets on debut =

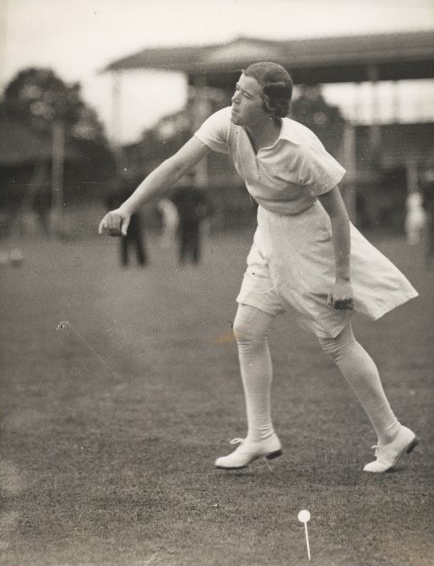
Myrtle Maclagan took seven wickets for 10 runs on her Test debut in 1934, achieving both the best figures on debut, and the first five-wicket haul in women's Tests.

Women's Test cricket has been played since 1934, when England faced Australia in a three-match series. Since that first match, over 130 Tests have been competed. The advent of Twenty20 cricket in the early part of the 21st century has all but eliminated Test cricket from the woman's game. Thirteen players have claimed five-wicket hauls (five or more wickets in an innings) on their debut in women's Test cricket.

The only occasion on which more than one player has taken a five-wicket haul on debut in the same match was during the first women's Test match in December 1934. During this match, three players achieved the feat; Myrtle Maclagan and Mary Spear for England, and Anne Palmer for Australia. Maclagan's bowling figures of seven wickets for 10 runs are the best by any woman on Test debut, and is one of three occasions on which a player has claimed seven wickets on their women's Test debut, along with Palmer and Lesley Johnston. Betty Wilson, who was the fourth player to take five wickets in an innings on debut, is the only woman to have taken ten wickets in a match on debut. Spear's five wickets for 51 runs was the most economical bowling when taking five wickets, conceding just 0.44 runs per over. Conversely, Shubhangi Kulkarni was the most expensive, allowing 4.11 runs per over. Isobel Joyce bowled the fewest overs in her innings when taking a five-wicket haul, six wickets for 21 runs from 11.1 overs.

The most recent occasion on which a player took five wickets in an innings on debut was in July 2007, when South Africa's Sunette Loubser achieved the feat in a match against the Netherlands.

== Key ==
- Date – Starting date of the match
- Inn – The innings of the match in which the five-wicket haul was taken
- Overs – Number of overs bowled in that innings
- Runs – Runs conceded
- Wkts – Number of wickets taken
- Econ – Bowling economy rate (average runs per over)
- Batsmen – The batsmen whose wickets were taken in the five-wicket haul
- Result – The result for the bowler's team in that match
- Won – The match was won by bowler's team
- Lost – The match was lost by bowler's team
- Drawn – The match was drawn
- ‡ – 10 wickets or more taken in the match

== Bowlers ==
Five-wicket hauls on debut in women's Test cricket
No.	Bowler	Date	Ground	For	Against	Inn	Overs	Runs	Wkts	Econ	Batsmen	Result
1	Myrtle Maclagan	28 December 1934	Exhibition Ground, Brisbane	England	Australia	1	17	10	7	0.58	Hazel Pritchard; Ruby Monaghan; Nell McLarty; Essie Shevill; Kath Smith; Lorna Kettels; Anne Palmer	Won
2	Anne Palmer	28 December 1934	Exhibition Ground, Brisbane	Australia	England	2	13.2	18	7	1.35	Myrtle Maclagan; Molly Hide; Mollie Child; Joy Partridge; Doris Turner; Mary Spear; Carol Valentine	Lost
3	Mary Spear	28 December 1934	Exhibition Ground, Brisbane	England	Australia	3	34	15	5	0.44	Hazel Pritchard; Nell McLarty; Lorna Kettels; Margaret Peden; Peggy Antonio	Won
4	Betty Wilson ‡	20 March 1948	Basin Reserve, Wellington	Australia	New Zealand	3	14	28	6	2.00	Vera Burt; Ina Lamason; Hilda Thompson; Phyl Blackler; Una Wickham; Vi Farrell	Won
5	Grace Gooder	26 March 1949	Eden Park, Auckland	New Zealand	England	1	23.2	42	6	1.80	Cecilia Robinson; Mary Duggan; Grace Morgan; Megan Lowe; Mary Johnson; Eileen Whelan	Lost
6	Loretta Bayliss	17 March 1961	Carisbrook, Dunedin	New Zealand	Australia	4	18	28	5	1.55	Kit Raymond; Joyce Christ; Valma Batty; Norma Wilson; Una Paisley	Drawn
7	Lesley Johnston	5 February 1972	St Kilda Cricket Ground, Melbourne	Australia	New Zealand	1	13.2 (Note: Eight-ball overs were bowled in this match.)	24	7	1.35	Janice Stead; Bev Brentnall; Lynda Prichard; Jill Saulbrey; Pat Carrick; Elaine White; Jackie Lord	Lost
8	Vivalyn Latty-Scott	7 May 1976	Jarrett Park, Jamaica	West Indies	Australia	2	41	48	5	1.17	Lorraine Hill; Wendy Hills; Jan Lumsden; Anne Gordon; Marie Cornish	Drawn
9	Shubhangi Kulkarni	31 October 1976	M. Chinnaswamy Stadium, Bangalore	India	West Indies	1	11.4	48	5	4.11	Patricia Whittaker; Yolande Geddes-Hall; Leila Williams; Sheryl Bayley; Nora St Rose	Drawn
10	Chamani Seneviratne	17 April 1998	Colts Cricket Club Ground, Colombo	Sri Lanka	Pakistan	2	24	31	5	1.29	Sadia Butt; Deebah Sherazi; Asma Farzand; Sharmeen Khan; Mahewish Khan	Won
11	Isobel Joyce	30 September 2000	College Park, Dublin	Ireland	Pakistan	3	11.1	21	6	1.88	Sajjida Shah; Khursheed Jabeen; Nazia Nazir; Kiran Baluch; Sadia Butt; Mahewish Khan	Won
12	Rebecca Steele	27 November 2003	Bilakhiya Stadium, Vapi	New Zealand	India	2	42	79	5	1.88	Anju Jain; Anjum Chopra; Jhulan Goswami; Mamatha Maben; Deepa Marathe	Drawn
13	Sunette Loubser	28 July 2007	Hazelaarweg, Rotterdam	South Africa	Netherlands	2	40.3	37	5	0.91	Violet Wattenberg; Marloes Braat; Caroline de Fouw; Mandy Kornet; Jolet Hartenhof	Won
