= England women's cricket team in Australia and New Zealand in 1934–35 =

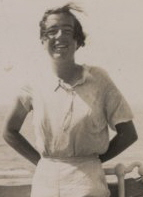
Myrtle Maclagan, whose all-round performances dominated all four Test matches on the tour.

The English women's cricket team toured Australia and New Zealand in 1934 and 1935. It was on this tour that the first women's Test matches were played: three against Australia, followed by one against New Zealand. England won the first two Tests against the Australians convincingly, and had the better of a drawn third Test, to clinch the Ashes. The game against New Zealand was even more one-sided in England's favour.

The idea for the tour was conceived by Australian captain Margaret Peden, who contacted future England captain Betty Snowball via her sister Barbara Peden, who was working in England as an architect. The Peden sisters and Snowball were all Christian Science adherents and their mothers had previously corresponded.

The tour itself was recorded for posterity in a series of photographs that are now in the National Library of Australia. These photographs show the cricketers playing the game on a long tour, which took in many matches apart from the international series. However, there are others showing the players relaxing on their vessel, the SS Rotorua, and on trips, such as to Melbourne Zoo or up New Zealand glaciers.

The Test matches were dominated by Myrtle Maclagan, who made 279 runs and took 26 wickets. So dominant was her performance that just after the men's team had lost the men's version of the Ashes, the Morning Post praised Maclagan's batting prowess with the quatrain:

What matter that we lost, mere nervy men
Since England's women now play England's game,
Wherefore Immortal Wisden, take your pen
And write MACLAGAN on the scroll of fame

However, she was outscored by Betty Snowball, who made 381 runs, including a mammoth 189 against the Kiwis.

== Test match details ==
=== First Test: England v Australia (28–31 December) ===
Australia
47
&
138
England won by 9 wickets

KM Smith 25
ME Maclagan 7/10

EM Shevill 63*
MF Spear 5/15

Exhibition Ground, Brisbane, Australia
Umpires: FJ Bartlett (Aus) and JA Scott (Aus)

England
154
&
34-1

ME Maclagan 72
A Palmer 7/18

EA Snowball 18*
P Antonio 1/20

Australian captain, Margaret Peden, won the toss and chose to bat. Australia, however, soon came up against England allrounder, Myrtle Maclagan, whose 7 wickets for the cost of only 10 runs saw Australia collapse to 47 all out. During that first innings, Australian wicket-keeper, Hilda Hills retired hurt on 2, with a broken nose. Hills then played no further part in the match, with Hazel Pritchard going behind the stumps in her place.

Maclagan opened the batting for England, and made 72 before she was the fifth woman out with England on 116, just before close on the first day. On day two, England moved on to 154, with Betty Archdale making 32 not out. In their second innings, Australia fared better, and were 99 for 5 at close on the second day. Maclagan failed to take a wicket in her 28 overs, but it was Mary Spear's five wickets that did the damage, as the home team were all of for 138, a total which included 63 runs scored over more than four hours from Essie Shevill. England were thus set just 32 for the win, which they secured with the loss of just one wicket.

In the match, Australia fielded sisters, Essie Shevill and Fernie Blade, Fernie was dropped after one test, her twin sister Rene Shevill played in the 2nd and 3rd tests.

=== Second Test: England v Australia (4–8 January) ===
Australia
162
&
148
England won by 8 wickets

KM Smith 47
ME Maclagan 4/33

EM Shevill 36*
JE Partridge 6/96

Sydney Cricket Ground, Sydney, Australia
Umpires: Puffet (Aus) and Simpkins (Aus)

England
301-5 dec
&
10-2

ME Maclagan 119
KM Smith 3/42

EA Snowball 4*
EA Shevill 1/2

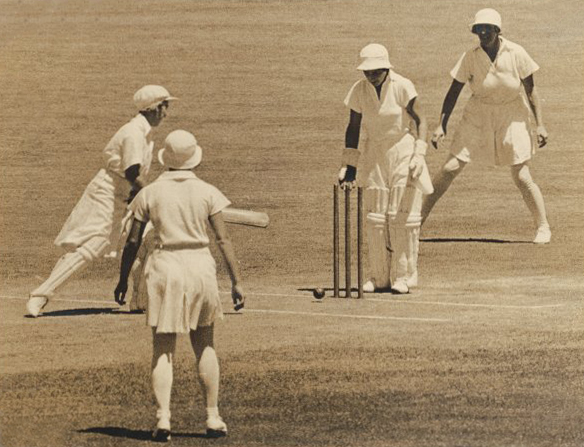
Action from the Second Test in Sydney in 1935

Peden won the toss for the second time, and chose to bat. Australia soon stumbled to 22 for 3, before recovering to 147 for 9 at close on the first day. There was no play on the second day, and on the third Australia put on 15 more runs before being dismissed. Maclagan had taken four wickets in Australia's innings, and she now proceeded to make the first century in Women's Test history, putting on 119 before being third out for 230. By the close of the third day, England had put on 301 for 5.

England captain, Betty Archdale, declared on the overnight score. On the fourth day, Joy Partridge took 6 for 96 as the Aussies stumbled to 148 all out. England easily made the 10 required for victory, though not before two wickets had been lost. As Rene Shevill took over as the Australian wicket-keeper from the injured Hill, Essie Shevill yet again played with one of her sisters. However, Rene's twin, Fernie Blade, did not play.

=== Third Test: England v Australia (18–20 January) ===
England
162
&
153-7 dec
Match drawn

ME Maclagan 50
P Antonio 6/49

EA Snowball 83*
A Palmer 3/17

Melbourne Cricket Ground, Melbourne, Australia
Umpires: HE Nichols (Aus) and WR Wettenhall (Aus)

Australia
150
&
104-8

A Palmer 39
MF Spear 3/21

JP Brewer 31
ME Maclagan 4/28

Archdale won the toss and chose to bat. England did not fare as well as in the earlier matches, though, and were only able to make 162, with Maclagan top-scoring on 50. Peggy Antonio took 6 for 49. Australia then made 31 for the loss of 1 wicket before stumps on the first day. The second day saw them to 150, just 12 behind England. 59 of these runs, however, were made for the ninth and tenth wicket. Without these, Australia probably would have slumped to a third consecutive defeat. As it was, however, England were tight for time, declaring on 153 for 7. Australia were made to face 57 overs, but were able to hang on, being eight down when the match ended. England therefore won the series two-nil.

=== Test Match: England v New Zealand (16–18 February) ===
New Zealand
44
&
122
England won by an innings and 337 runs

M Hollis 24
ME Maclagan 5/22

MC Bishop 27
JE Partridge 4/60

Lancaster Park, Christchurch, New Zealand
Umpires: R Coleman and J McGuinness

England
503-5 dec

EA Snowball 189
RE Symons 2/71

Although scheduled as a three-day match, it was soon clear that it would not last the course. New Zealand won the toss and chose to bat, but were dismissed within 30 overs for a dire 44. Maclagan had taken 5 wickets, and Peta Taylor 3 to complete the rout. Maclagan, however, was first out at 55 for 1 in England's reply. Honours instead went to Betty Snowball, who set a new Test match record score of 189. Molly Hide also made a century as New Zealand's attack lacked any penetration. England batted on past their first day score of 431 for 4, finally declaring on 503 for 5.

New Zealand batted better in their second innings, but an England victory was never in doubt as Joy Partridge took 4 wickets to end England's Test match tour on a comprehensive high.
