= Australia women's cricket team in England in 1937 =

Australian women's cricket team in England in 1937
	England	Australia
- Dates: 2 June 1937 – 28 July 1937
Captains	Molly Hide	Margaret Peden

Test series
- Result: 3-match series drawn 1–1
Most runs	Myrtle Maclagan (315)	Hazel Pritchard (306)
Most wickets	Molly Hide (14)	Peggy Antonio (19)

The Australian women's cricket team toured England from May to July 1937. The tour was the second series of the Women's Ashes.

They played 3 Tests against the English women's cricket team, with the series finishing 1-1, with one game drawn. The Australian women also played 16 tour games.

== Test series ==
=== 1st Test ===
12–15 June 1937
Scorecard

Australia	v	England
300 (119.5 overs); Kath Smith 88; Molly Hide 3/50 (22 overs)		204 (88.2 overs); Myrtle Maclagan 89; Peggy Antonio 6/51 (18.2 overs)
102 (56.1 overs); Nell McLarty 23; Molly Hide 2/10 (11 overs)		167 (88.2 overs); Betty Snowball 72; Kath Smith 4/50 (32 overs)

Australia won by 31 runs
County Ground, Northampton

- Australia won the toss and elected to bat.
- No play on Sunday 13 June, which was a rest day

=== 2nd Test ===
26–29 June 1937
Scorecard

England	v	Australia
222 (86 overs); Myrtle Maclagan 115; Peggy Antonio 3/34 (9 overs)		302 (117.2 overs); Hazel Pritchard 67; Molly Hide 3/38 (19 overs)
231 (97 overs); Muriel Lowe 57; Peggy Antonio 5/31 (14 overs)		126 (57.2 overs); Winnie George 34; Molly Hide 5/20 (12.2 overs)

England won by 25 runs
Stanley Park, Blackpool

- England won the toss and elected to bat.
- No play on Sunday 27 June, which was a rest day

=== 3rd Test ===
10–13 July 1937
Scorecard

Australia	v	England
207/9 dec (101 overs); Patricia Holmes 70; Joan Davis 5/31 (13 overs)		308/9 dec (124.4 overs); Betty Snowball 99; Nell McLarty 3/29 (37 overs)
224 (93.4 overs); Hazel Pritchard 66; Joan Davis 3/55 (17.4 overs)		9/3 (3 overs); Betty Belton 8 Molly Flaherty 2/4 (2 overs)

Match drawn
The Oval, London

- Australia won the toss and elected to bat.
- No play on Sunday 11 July, which was a rest day
