= Ruby Monaghan =

Australian cricketer

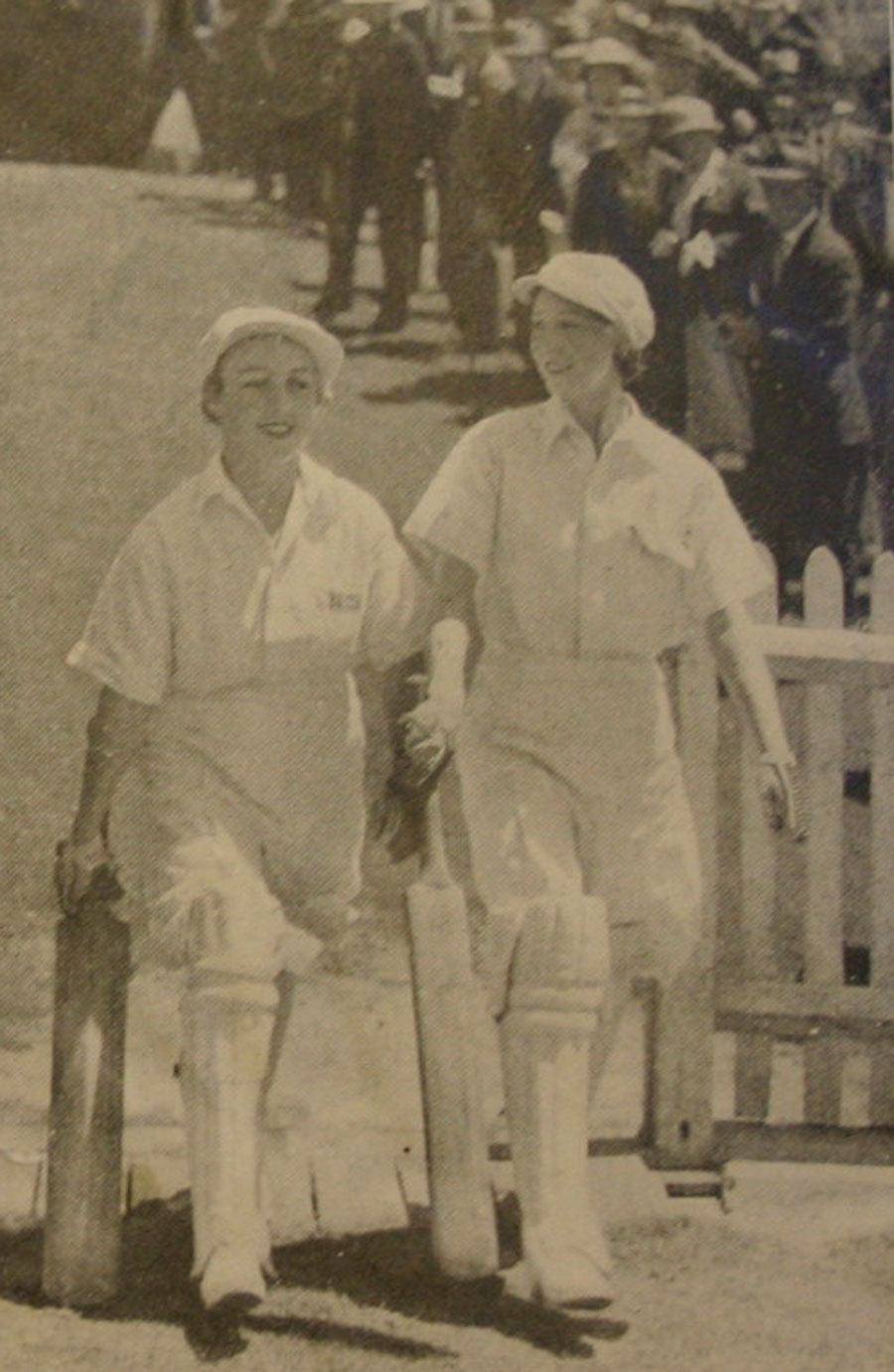
- Monaghan (left) and Hazel Pritchard walking out to bat in the second women's Test match.

Cricket information
- Batting: Right-handed
- Bowling: Right-arm medium

International information
- National side: Australia
- Test debut (cap 3): 28 December 1934 v England
- Last Test: 4 January 1935 v England

Career statistics
Competition	WTest
Matches	2
Runs scored	29
Batting average	7.25
100s/50s	0/0
Top score	12
Catches/stumpings	0/–
- Source: Cricinfo, 30 October 2014

Ruby Agnes (Monaghan) Lee (24 May 1916 – 10 June 2012) was one of the earliest women cricketers. An Australian born in Coniston, New South Wales, Monaghan was a right-handed batter and right-arm medium bowler, and she opened the batting to face the first deliveries of the first ever Women's Test match, the Australia Women versus England Women Test at Brisbane on 28 December 1934. She had earned selection after strong showings at a warm-up game against the same touring England side in the weeks prior to the Test. Upon the merging of men's and women's cricket administrations in 2003, she was awarded the third Women's Test cap. She came to the sport after playing vigaro, and resumed playing softball and tennis after ending her time with cricket. She died in Wollongong.

== Personal life ==
Monaghan married William Lee on 30 March 1940.
