= Anne Palmer =

Anne Palmer may refer to:

- Anne Lennard, Countess of Sussex (1661–1722), née Palmer
- Lady Anne Brewis (née Palmer, 1911–2002), English botanist
- Anne Palmer (cricketer) (1915–2006), Test cricketer for Australia
