= Ruth Symons =

New Zealand cricketer

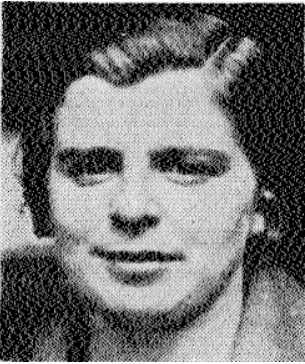
- Ruth Symons in 1935

Personal information
- Full name: Ruth Evelyn Symons
- Born: 3 October 1913; Christchurch, New Zealand
- Died: 11 September 2004 (aged 90); Christchurch, New Zealand
- Batting: Right-handed
- Bowling: Right-arm medium
- Role: All-rounder

International information
- National side: New Zealand (1935)
- Only Test (cap 10): 16 February 1935 v England

Domestic team information
- Years: Team
- 1938/39–1939/40: Canterbury

Career statistics
Competition	WTest	WFC
Matches	1	3
Runs scored	5	64
Batting average	5.00	12.80
100s/50s	0/0	0/0
Top score	5	34
Balls bowled	120	210
Wickets	2	6
Bowling average	35.50	26.66
5 wickets in innings	0	0
10 wickets in match	0	0
Best bowling	2/71	3/18
Catches/stumpings	1/–	8/–
- Source: CricketArchive, 28 November 2021

Ruth Evelyn Martin (née Symons; 3 October 1913 – 11 September 2004) was a New Zealand cricketer who played as a right-handed batter and right-arm medium bowler. She played one Test match for New Zealand, their first, in 1935. She played domestic cricket for Canterbury.

Symons captained Canterbury, and she was selected to captain New Zealand in their first women's Test match, against England in Christchurch in February 1935, which England won. In Canterbury's victory over Otago in March 1937 she took 6 for 6 and 3 for 23.

She married Lester Martin at St Mark's Church, near her home in Opawa, Christchurch, in April 1935. She died in Christchurch in 2004.
