= Australia women's cricket team in India in 2022–23 =

International cricket tour

	India	Australia
- Dates: 9 – 20 December 2022
Captains	Harmanpreet Kaur	Alyssa Healy (Note: Tahlia McGrath captained Australia in the fifth T20I.)

Twenty20 International series
- Results: Australia won the 5-match series 4–1
Most runs	Shafali Verma (140)	Beth Mooney (205)
Most wickets	Deepti Sharma (6)	Heather Graham (7); Ashleigh Gardner (7)
- Player of the series: Ashleigh Gardner (Aus)

The Australia women's cricket team toured India in December 2022 to play five Twenty20 International (T20I) matches. The Board of Control for Cricket in India (BCCI) confirmed the schedule for the tour in November 2022. Both teams used the series as preparation for the 2023 ICC Women's T20 World Cup tournament.

Australia won the series 4–1, after Heather Graham took a hat-trick in the final match.

== Squads ==
India	Australia
Harmanpreet Kaur (c); Smriti Mandhana (vc); Yastika Bhatia (wk); Harleen Deol; Rajeshwari Gayakwad; Richa Ghosh (wk); Sabbhineni Meghana; Jemimah Rodrigues; Anjali Sarvani; Deepti Sharma; Meghna Singh; Renuka Singh; Devika Vaidya; Shafali Verma; Radha Yadav	Alyssa Healy (c, wk); Tahlia McGrath (vc); Darcie Brown; Nicola Carey; Ashleigh Gardner; Kim Garth; Heather Graham; Grace Harris; Jess Jonassen; Alana King; Phoebe Litchfield; Beth Mooney (wk); Ellyse Perry; Megan Schutt; Annabel Sutherland; Amanda-Jade Wellington

Amanda-Jade Wellington was added to Australia's squad after the first T20I, replacing Jess Jonassen who was ruled out due to a hamstring injury. Australia's captain Alyssa Healy was ruled out of the last match of the series due to an injury, with Tahlia McGrath was appointed as captain.

== T20I series ==
=== 1st T20I ===
9 December 2022
19:00 (N)
Scorecard

India; 172/5 (20 overs)	v	Australia; 173/1 (18.1 overs)
Deepti Sharma 36* (15); Ellyse Perry 2/10 (2 overs)		Beth Mooney 89* (57); Devika Vaidya 1/33 (3 overs)

Australia won by 9 wickets
DY Patil Stadium, Navi Mumbai
Umpires: Narayanan Janani (Ind) and Vrinda Rathi (Ind)
Player of the match: Beth Mooney (Aus)

- Australia won the toss and elected to field.
- Anjali Sarvani (Ind) made her T20I debut.
- Kim Garth also made her T20I debut for Australia after previously playing 51 T20Is for Ireland, becoming the fourth women's cricketer to represent two international teams in T20Is.

=== 2nd T20I ===
11 December 2022
19:00 (N)
Scorecard

Australia; 187/1 (20 overs)	v	India; 187/5 (20 overs)
Beth Mooney 82* (54); Deepti Sharma 1/31 (4 overs)		Smriti Mandhana 79 (49); Heather Graham 3/22 (4 overs)

Match tied
(India won the Super Over)
DY Patil Stadium, Navi Mumbai
Umpires: Vrinda Rathi (Ind) and Gayathri Venugopalan (Ind)
Player of the match: Smriti Mandhana (Ind)

- India won the toss and elected to field.
- Heather Graham and Phoebe Litchfield (Aus) both made their T20I debuts.
- Super Over: India 20/1, Australia 16/1.

=== 3rd T20I ===
14 December 2022
19:00 (N)
Scorecard

Australia; 172/8 (20 overs)	v	India; 151/7 (20 overs)
Ellyse Perry 75 (47); Devika Vaidya 2/22 (3 overs)		Shafali Verma 52 (41); Darcie Brown 2/19 (4 overs)

Australia won by 21 runs
Brabourne Stadium, Mumbai
Umpires: Narayanan Janani (Ind) and Gayathri Venugopalan (Ind)
Player of the match: Ellyse Perry (Aus)

- India won the toss and elected to field.

=== 4th T20I ===
17 December 2022
19:00 (N)
Scorecard

Australia; 188/3 (20 overs)	v	India; 181/5 (20 overs)
Ellyse Perry 72* (42); Deepti Sharma 2/35 (4 overs)		Harmanpreet Kaur 46 (30); Ashleigh Gardner 2/20 (4 overs)

Australia won by 7 runs
Brabourne Stadium, Mumbai
Umpires: Narayanan Janani (Ind) and Nand Kishore (Ind)
Player of the match: Ashleigh Gardner (Aus)

- India won the toss and elected to field.

=== 5th T20I ===
20 December 2022
19:00 (N)
Scorecard

Australia; 196/4 (20 overs)	v	India; 142 (20 overs)
Ashleigh Gardner 66* (32); Shafali Verma 1/17 (2 overs)		Deepti Sharma 53 (34); Heather Graham 4/8 (2 overs)

Australia won by 54 runs
Brabourne Stadium, Mumbai
Umpires: Vrinda Rathi (Ind) and Gayathri Venugopalan (Ind)
Player of the match: Ashleigh Gardner (Aus)

- India won the toss and elected to field.
