= Joan Davis (cricketer) =

Welsh cricketer (1911–2004)

Personal information
- Full name: Gwladys Joan Davis
- Born: 2 June 1911; Glamorgan, Wales
- Died: 11 October 2004 (aged 93); North Surrey, England
- Batting: Left-handed
- Bowling: Left arm medium-fast
- Role: Bowler

International information
- National side: England (1937)
- Test debut (cap 14): 12 June 1937 v Australia
- Last Test: 13 July 1937 v Australia

Domestic team information
- Years: Team
- 1937: Middlesex

Career statistics
Competition	WTest	WFC
Matches	3	6
Runs scored	44	186
Batting average	8.80	20.66
100s/50s	0/0	0/1
Top score	19	86
Balls bowled	258	500
Wickets	11	14
Bowling average	11.36	17.28
5 wickets in innings	1	1
10 wickets in match	0	0
Best bowling	5/31	5/31
Catches/stumpings	3/–	5/–
- Source: CricketArchive, 11 March 2021

Gwladys Joan Davis (née Thomas; 2 June 1911 – 11 October 2004) was a Welsh cricketer who played primarily as a left-arm medium-fast bowler. She appeared in three Test matches for England in 1937, all against Australia. She played domestic cricket for Middlesex.
