= New Zealand women's cricket team in Australia in 2018–19 =

International cricket tour

	Australia women	New Zealand women
- Dates: 27 September 2018 – 3 March 2019
Captains	Meg Lanning	Amy Satterthwaite

One Day International series
- Results: Australia women won the 3-match series 3–0
Most runs	Ellyse Perry (167)	Amy Satterthwaite (178)
Most wickets	Jess Jonassen (9)	Sophie Devine (5); Amelia Kerr (5)

Twenty20 International series
- Results: Australia women won the 3-match series 3–0
Most runs	Alyssa Healy (138)	Katey Martin (94)
Most wickets	Ellyse Perry (6)	Sophie Devine (4)
- Player of the series: Alyssa Healy (Aus)

The New Zealand women's cricket team toured to play against Australia women's cricket team between September 2018 and October 2018, and again between February 2019 and March 2019. The tour consisted of three Women's One Day Internationals (WODIs), which formed part of the 2017–20 ICC Women's Championship, and three Women's Twenty20 Internationals (WT20I). Prior to the tour, Suzie Bates stepped down as captain of New Zealand Women and was replaced by Amy Satterthwaite.

Australia Women won the WT20I series 3–0. They also won the WODI series 3–0.

== Squads ==
WODIs		WT20Is	
Australia	New Zealand	Australia	New Zealand
Meg Lanning (c); Nicola Carey; Lauren Cheatle; Ashleigh Gardner; Rachael Haynes; Alyssa Healy; Jess Jonassen; Delissa Kimmince; ~~Sophie Molineux~~; Beth Mooney; Ellyse Perry; Megan Schutt; Elyse Villani; Georgia Wareham	Amy Satterthwaite (c); Suzie Bates; Sophie Devine; Lauren Down; Maddy Green; Hayley Jensen; Leigh Kasperek; Amelia Kerr; Rosemary Mair; Katey Martin; Katie Perkins; Anna Peterson; Hannah Rowe; Lea Tahuhu	Meg Lanning (c); Rachael Haynes (vc); Nicola Carey; Ashleigh Gardner; Alyssa Healy; Delissa Kimmince; Sophie Molineux; Beth Mooney; Ellyse Perry; Megan Schutt; Elyse Villani; Tayla Vlaeminck; Georgia Wareham	Amy Satterthwaite (c); Suzie Bates; Bernadine Bezuidenhout; Sophie Devine; Kate Ebrahim; Maddy Green; Holly Huddleston; Hayley Jensen; Leigh Kasperek; Amelia Kerr; Katey Martin; Lea Tahuhu; Jess Watkin

Sophie Molineux was ruled out of Australia's WODI squad due to injury and was replaced by Delissa Kimmince.

== Tour matches ==
=== 1st 20 over match: Cricket Australia Women's XI vs Australia women ===
27 September 2018
10:00
Scorecard

Cricket Australia Women's XI; 5/124 (20 overs)	v	Australia; 1/125 (13 overs)
Nicole Bolton 42 (39); Georgia Wareham 2/25 (4 overs)		Beth Mooney 54* (38); Belinda Vakarewa 1/15 (2 overs)

Australia Women won by 9 wickets
Manly Oval, Sydney
Umpires: Greg Davidson (Aus) and Claire Polosak (Aus)
Player of the match: Beth Mooney (Aus)

- Australia Women won the toss and elected to field.

=== 2nd 20 over match: Cricket Australia Women's XI vs New Zealand women ===
27 September 2018
14:00
Scorecard

Cricket Australia Women's XI; 9/149 (20 overs)	v	New Zealand; 5/152 (19.1 overs)
Rachael Haynes 56 (35); Amelia Kerr 3/15 (3 overs)		Maddy Green 36* (23); Amanda-Jade Wellington 3/33 (4 overs)

New Zealand Women won by 5 wickets
Manly Oval, Sydney
Umpires: Donovan Koch (Aus) and Ben Treloar (Aus)
Player of the match: Maddy Green (NZ)

- Cricket Australia Women's XI won the toss and elected to bat.

=== 50 over match: Governor General's XI v New Zealand Women ===
28 February 2019
13:50 (D/N)
Scorecard

New Zealand; 7/323 (50 overs)	v	Governor General's XI; 157 (38.2 overs)
Lauren Down 107 (134); Heather Graham 2/48 (7 overs)		Annabel Sutherland 32 (46); Anna Peterson 3/28 (6.2 overs)

New Zealand Women won by 166 runs
Drummoyne Oval, Drummoyne
Umpires: Claire Polosak (Aus) and Ben Treloar (Aus)
Player of the match: Lauren Down (NZ)

- Governor General's XI won the toss and elected to field.

== WT20I series ==
=== 1st WT20I ===
29 September 2018
19:10 (N)
Scorecard

New Zealand; 5/162 (20 overs)	v	Australia; 4/164 (17.4 overs)
Katey Martin 56* (34); Ashleigh Gardner 2/22 (3 overs)		Rachael Haynes 69* (40); Leigh Kasperek 2/28 (3 overs)

Australia Women won by 6 wickets
North Sydney Oval, Sydney
Umpires: Phillip Gillespie (Aus) and Sam Nogajski (Aus)
Player of the match: Rachael Haynes (Aus)

- Australia Women won the toss and elected to field.
- Georgia Wareham (Aus) made her WT20I debut.
- This was Australia Women's highest successful run chase against New Zealand Women in WT20Is.
- Rachael Haynes and Meg Lanning (Aus) set the highest fifth-wicket partnership in a WT20I match with 119 not out.

=== 2nd WT20I ===
1 October 2018
14:10
Scorecard

New Zealand; 8/145 (20 overs)	v	Australia; 4/149 (18.5 overs)
Suzie Bates 77 (52); Megan Schutt 3/15 (4 overs)		Alyssa Healy 57 (41); Amelia Kerr 1/23 (2.5 overs)

Australia Women won by 6 wickets
Allan Border Field, Brisbane
Umpires: Shawn Craig (Aus) and Phillip Gillespie (Aus)
Player of the match: Megan Schutt (Aus)

- Australia Women won the toss and elected to field.
- Alyssa Healy (Aus) scored her 1,000th run in WT20Is.

=== 3rd WT20I ===
5 October 2018
19:20 (N)
Scorecard

New Zealand; 103 (19 overs)	v	Australia; 1/105 (12.3 overs)
Katey Martin 35* (34); Ellyse Perry 4/21 (4 overs)		Alyssa Healy 67 (44); Sophie Devine 1/14 (3 overs)

Australia Women won by 9 wickets
Manuka Oval, Canberra
Umpires: Shawn Craig (Aus) and Sam Nogajski (Aus)
Player of the match: Ellyse Perry (Aus)

- Australia Women won the toss and elected to field.
- Ellyse Perry (Aus) took her 250th wicket in international cricket.

== WODI series ==
=== 1st WODI ===
ICC Women's Championship
22 February 2019
10:20
Scorecard

Australia; 241 (49.4 overs)	v	New Zealand; 9/236 (50 overs)
Rachael Haynes 67 (80); Sophie Devine 3/32 (10 overs)		Amy Satterthwaite 92 (123); Jess Jonassen 4/43 (10 overs)

Australia Women won by 5 runs
WACA Ground, Perth
Umpires: Phillip Gillespie (Aus) and Claire Polosak (Aus)
Player of the match: Jess Jonassen (Aus)

- New Zealand Women won the toss and elected to field.
- Rosemary Mair (NZ) made her WODI debut.
- Points: Australia Women 2, New Zealand Women 0.

=== 2nd WODI ===
ICC Women's Championship
24 February 2019
10:20
Scorecard

Australia; 7/247 (50 overs)	v	New Zealand; 152 (37.5 overs)
Ellyse Perry 107* (110); Amelia Kerr 3/30 (7 overs)		Sophie Devine 47 (59); Jess Jonassen 5/27 (8 overs)

Australia Women won by 95 runs
Karen Rolton Oval, Adelaide
Umpires: Shawn Craig (Aus) and Phillip Gillespie (Aus)
Player of the match: Ellyse Perry (Aus)

- New Zealand Women won the toss and elected to field.
- Ellyse Perry (Aus) scored her first century in WODIs.
- Points: Australia Women 2, New Zealand Women 0.

=== 3rd WODI ===
ICC Women's Championship
3 March 2019
10:50
Scorecard

New Zealand; 8/231 (50 overs)	v	Australia; 3/233 (47.5 overs)
Sophie Devine 58 (90); Ashleigh Gardner 3/49 (9 overs)		Ellyse Perry 54* (75); Leigh Kasperek 2/54 (9.5 overs)

Australia Women won by 7 wickets
Junction Oval, Melbourne
Umpires: Shawn Craig (Aus) and Claire Polosak (Aus)
Player of the match: Ashleigh Gardner (Aus)

- New Zealand Women won the toss and elected to bat.
- Points: Australia Women 2, New Zealand Women 0.
