= Nell McLarty =

Australian cricketer

Personal information
- Full name: Ellen Mary McLarty
- Born: 5 January 1912; North Fremantle, Western Australia
- Died: 26 December 1998 (aged 86); Melbourne, Victoria
- Batting: Right-handed
- Bowling: Right-arm medium-fast

International information
- National side: Australia
- Test debut (cap 4): 28 December 1934 v England
- Last Test: 10 July 1937 v England

Domestic team information
- Years: Team
- 1930/31–1939/40: Victoria

Career statistics
Competition	Test	First-class
Matches	5	27
Runs scored	66	536
Batting average	6.60	15.76
100s/50s	0/0	0/0
Top score	23	46*
Balls bowled	888	2,494
Wickets	11	53
Bowling average	20.36	18.00
5 wickets in innings	0	1
10 wickets in match	0	0
Best bowling	3/29	6/21
Catches/stumpings	8/–	47/–
- Source: CricketArchive, 2 March 2013

Ellen Mary McLarty BEM (5 January 1912 – 26 December 1998) was a cricketer who played for the Australia national women's cricket team between 1934 and 1937. She played for Australia in the first women's Test match. A right-arm medium-fast bowler, she claimed 11 wickets in international cricket at an average of 20.36.

== Life and career ==
McLarty was born in North Fremantle, Western Australia on 5 January 1912. She played no formal cricket until she joined a women's cricket team in Clarendon in 1930. The following season, she joined the Collingwood women's team, and played there for the rest of her career, captaining the side in her final years there. She was forced to retire in 1940 because of her health. She represented Victoria in state cricket throughout her career. In December 1934, she was selected to represent Australia in the first women's Test match, played against England. She batted at number three in the first innings, being dismissed for a duck, and at number five in the second innings, when she scored 8 runs. She claimed one wicket in England's first innings, bowling Joy Liebert, to record figures of one for 12. She was most effective during Australia's tour of England in 1937, where she scored 14 and 23 in the first innings of the first Test match in Northampton, and claimed at least three wickets in each Test. In 1947, she was granted a testimonial by the Victorian Women's Cricket Association. She was awarded the British Empire Medal in 1980 for her services to women's cricket, and died in Melbourne on 26 December 1998.
