= Lesley Johnston =

Australian cricketer

Personal information
- Full name: Lesley June Johnston
- Born: 9 June 1937; Wedderburn, Victoria, Australia
- Died: 7 September 2006 (aged 69); Melbourne, Australia
- Batting: Left-handed
- Bowling: Slow left-arm orthodox
- Role: Bowler

International information
- National side: Australia (1972)
- Only Test (cap 73): 5 February 1972 v New Zealand

Domestic team information
- Years: Team
- 1956/57–1971/72: Victoria

Career statistics
Competition	WTest	WFC
Matches	1	13
Runs scored	28	82
Batting average	14.00	9.11
100s/50s	0/0	0/0
Top score	22	24
Balls bowled	370	1,360
Wickets	8	64
Bowling average	14.00	10.54
5 wickets in innings	1	5
10 wickets in match	0	0
Best bowling	7/24	7/24
Catches/stumpings	1/–	4/–
- Source: CricketArchive, 15 November 2023

Lesley June Johnston (née Dennis; 9 June 1937 – 7 September 2006) was an Australian cricketer who played as a slow left-arm orthodox bowler. She appeared in one Test match for Australia in 1972. She played domestic cricket for Victoria.

During her only international appearance, she claimed seven wickets for the concession of 24 runs in the second innings against New Zealand.
