= Mary Spear =

English cricketer (1913–2006)

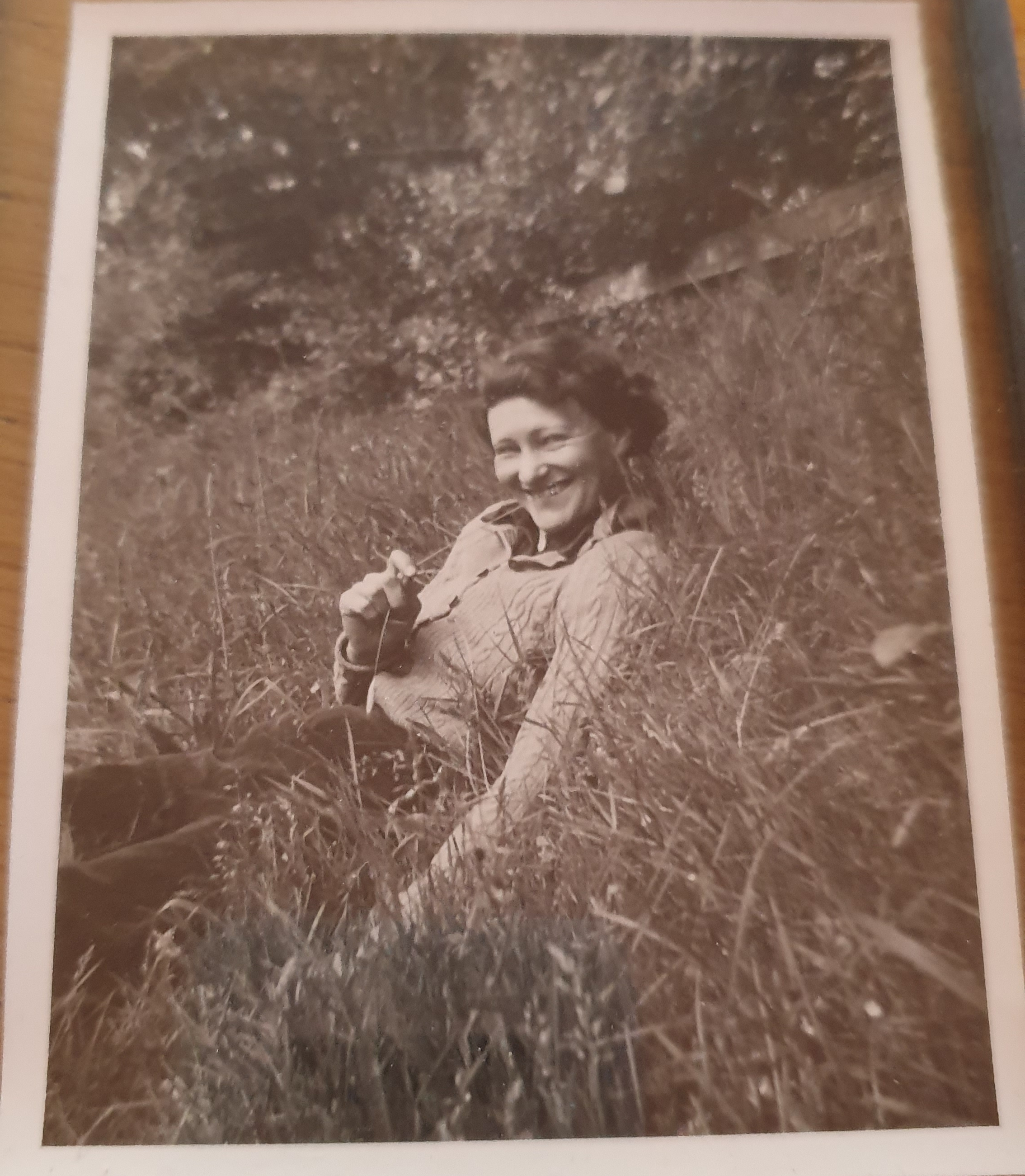

Personal information
- Full name: Mary Frances Spear
- Born: 11 September 1913; Bath, Somerset, England
- Died: 10 April 2006 (aged 92); Crickhowell, Brecknockshire, Wales
- Batting: Right-handed
- Bowling: Right arm medium
- Role: Bowler

International information
- National side: England (1934–1935)
- Test debut (cap 8): 28 December 1934 v Australia
- Last Test: 18 February 1935 v New Zealand

Domestic team information
- Years: Team
- 1937: West

Career statistics
Competition	WTest	WFC
Matches	4	10
Runs scored	16	98
Batting average	16.00	16.33
100s/50s	0/0	0/0
Top score	9	23
Balls bowled	702	1,499
Wickets	14	28
Bowling average	5.78	10.71
5 wickets in innings	1	1
10 wickets in match	0	0
Best bowling	5/15	5/15
Catches/stumpings	3/–	5/–
- Source: CricketArchive, 11 March 2021

Mary Frances Spear (11 September 1913 – 10 April 2006) was an English cricketer who played as a right-handed batter and right-arm medium bowler. She appeared in four Test matches for England between 1934 and 1935, including the first women's Test in history. She played domestic cricket for West of England.
