= Hazel Pritchard =

Australian cricketer

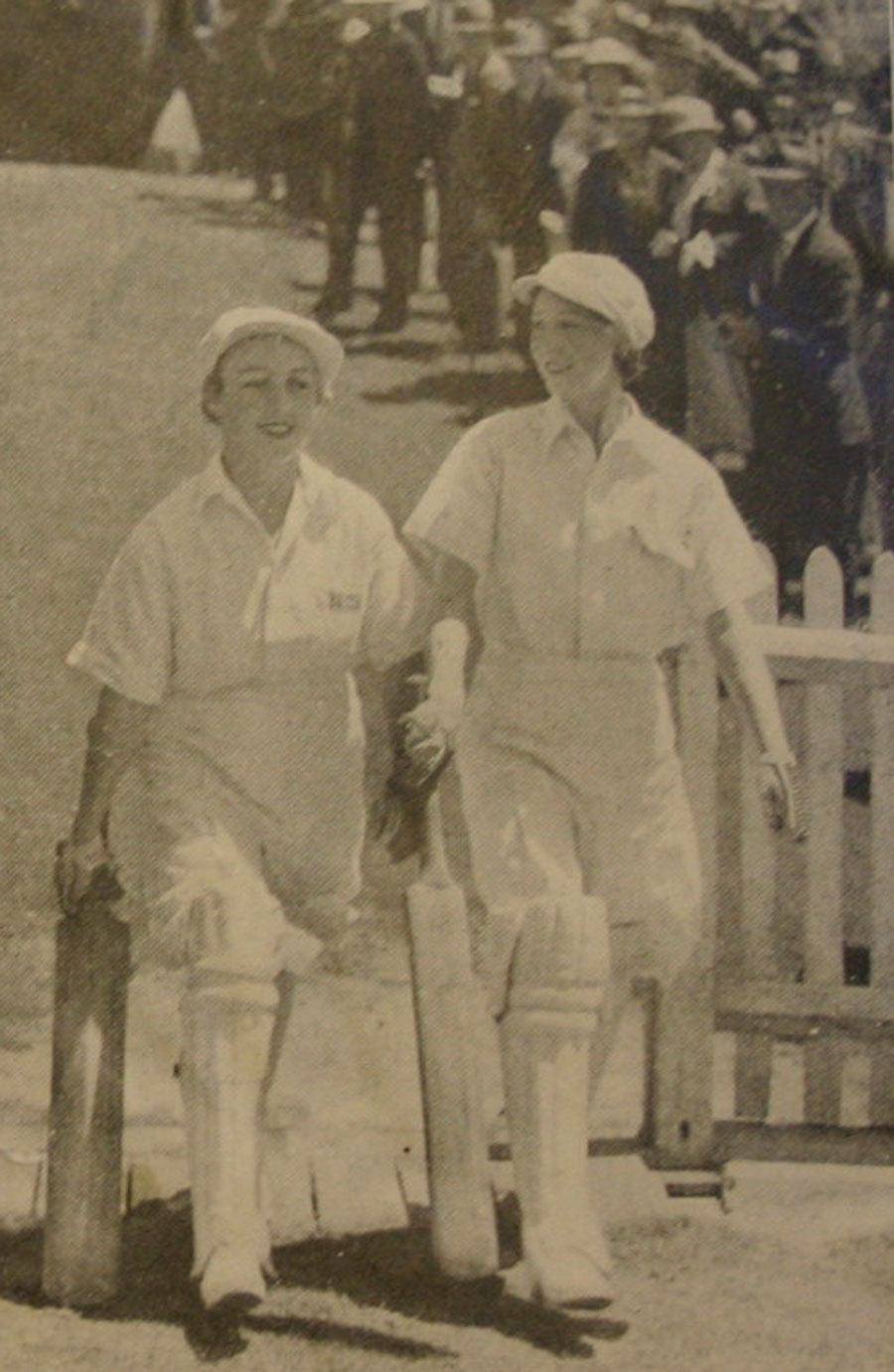
- Pritchard (right) walking out to bat in the second women's Test match.

Personal information
- Full name: Hazel Doreen Pritchard
- Born: 23 December 1913; Sydney, NSW, Australia
- Died: 3 November 1967 (aged 53); Sydney, NSW, Australia
- Batting: Right-handed

International information
- National side: Australia
- Test debut (cap 2): 28 December 1934 v England
- Last Test: 10 July 1937 v England

Domestic team information
- Years: Team
- 1931–: New South Wales

Career statistics
Competition	Test
Matches	6
Runs scored	340
Batting average	28.33
100s/50s	0/3
Top score	87
Catches/stumpings	1/0
- Source: ESPNcricinfo, 17 February 2013

Hazel Doreen Pritchard (23 December 1913 – 3 November 1967) was a cricketer who played for the Australia women's national cricket team between 1934 and 1937. She opened the batting for Australia in the first Women's Test match, against England on 28 December 1934. A right-handed batsman, she scored 340 runs in international matches, at an average of 28.33. In 2011, she was inducted into the Cricket New South Wales Hall of Fame.

== Life and career ==
Pritchard was born in Sydney on 23 December 1913. She made her debut in state cricket for New South Wales in 1931 at the age of 17. During England's 1934–35 tour of Australia and New Zealand, she faced the touring side in four matches. The first of these appearances was for New South Wales, for whom she top-scored in both innings, making 27 and 75 in a match that England won by seven wickets. In the following match, the first Women's Test match, Pritchard faced the first ball. She eventually hit her own wicket after scoring four runs. In the second innings, she improved, scoring 20 runs. She fared less well in the second Test, suffering a pair: being dismissed without scoring in both innings. In the third match, she batted in the middle order in the first innings, and returned to open the batting in the second, scoring five runs in each innings of the drawn match.

During the 1936–37 season, she scored the first century in women's interstate cricket, retiring out after scoring 144 against Queensland. She was part of the Australian team which toured England in 1937. During that tour, she was Australia's most effective batsman, scoring 306 Test runs at an average of 51.00. She began the tour strongly, with scores of 74 not out against Kent, and 96 and 43 not out against the Midlands. She helped Australia to victory in the first Test match, hitting 87 runs in the first innings and 17 in the second. During her next match, against a team representing the "North of England", she scored the first century by an Australian woman in England, remaining 144 not out as Australia recorded a large victory. Pritchard top-scored for Australia in both innings of the second Test, making 67 and 41, but a century from Myrtle Maclagan helped England to win by 25 runs. She recorded a half-century and two low scores in tour matches before the third Test, in which she scored 28 runs in the first innings and 66 in the second in a drawn match.

Her performances drew comparisons to Don Bradman, and she was nicknamed the "Girl Bradman". The outbreak of the Second World War ended her cricket career; in all she scored 340 Test runs at an average of 28.33, with a top-score of 87. Her contributions were recognised in 2011, when she was inducted into the Cricket New South Wales Hall of Fame. She died on 3 November 1967 in Sydney, aged 53.
