= Joy Partridge =

English cricketer

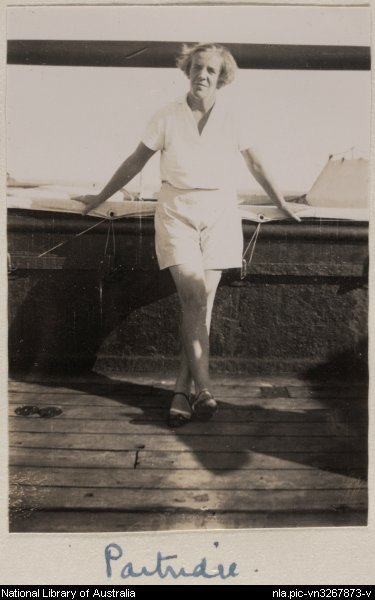

Personal information
- Full name: Joy Evelyn Partridge
- Born: 28 March 1899; Lindridge, Worcestershire, England
- Died: 27 April 1947 (aged 48); High Wycombe, Buckinghamshire, England
- Batting: Right-handed
- Bowling: Right arm slow
- Role: Bowler

International information
- National side: England (1934–1935)
- Test debut (cap 6): 28 December 1934 v Australia
- Last Test: 18 February 1935 v New Zealand

Domestic team information
- Years: Team
- 1936: Buckinghamshire

Career statistics
Competition	WTest	WFC
Matches	4	11
Runs scored	33	169
Batting average	8.25	15.36
100s/50s	0/0	0/1
Top score	26*	63
Balls bowled	637	829
Wickets	12	15
Bowling average	22.91	24.13
5 wickets in innings	1	1
10 wickets in match	0	0
Best bowling	6/96	6/96
Catches/stumpings	5/–	8/–
- Source: CricketArchive, 11 March 2021

Joy Evelyn Partridge (28 March 1899 – 27 April 1947) was an English cricketer who played as a right-handed batter and right-arm slow bowler. She appeared in four Test matches for England in 1934 and 1935. She played in the first four women's Test matches in history, with her best performance coming in the second innings of the second Test against Australia, when her 6/96 helped England to an Ashes-winning victory by 8 wickets. She played domestic cricket for Buckinghamshire.
