= Betty Snowball =

English cricketer and sportswoman

Personal information
- Born: 9 July 1908; Burnley, Lancashire, England
- Died: 13 December 1988 (aged 80); Colwall, Herefordshire, England
- Nickname: Betty
- Height: 5 ft 0 in (1.52 m)
- Batting: Right-handed
- Role: Wicket-keeper

International information
- National side: England (1934–1949)
- Test debut (cap 7): 28 December 1934 v Australia
- Last Test: 22 February 1949 v Australia

Domestic team information
- Years: Team
- 1933–1934: West
- 1937: Hampshire
- 1947: Lancashire

Umpiring information
- WTests umpired: 1 (1951)

Career statistics
Competition	WTest	WFC
Matches	10	31
Runs scored	613	1,310
Batting average	40.86	34.47
100s/50s	1/4	3/7
Top score	189	189
Catches/stumpings	13/8	38/16
- Source: CricketArchive, 11 March 2021

Elizabeth Alexandra Snowball (9 July 1908 – 13 December 1988) was an English sportsperson. She played international cricket in the England women's cricket team, and also played international squash and lacrosse for Scotland.

== Early life ==
Snowball was born in Burnley, Lancashire. Her father, Thomas Snowball, was a doctor from Scotland. She was educated at St Leonards School in St Andrews and then Bedford Physical Training College. She became a teacher of physical education at St Swithun's School, Winchester. Her father was an active club cricketer, and encouraged his daughter to play at school. She was coached for a period by Learie Constantine.

== Sporting career ==
She appeared in 10 Test matches between 1934 and 1949, playing as a right-handed batter and wicket-keeper. She scored 189 runs in 222 minutes playing against New Zealand at Christchurch in February 1935, the fourth women's Test match to be played, setting a world record for the highest individual innings in women's Test cricket which was not surpassed for over 50 years, until Sandhya Agarwal scored 190 in 1986. It remained the highest Test score by an Englishwoman until June 2023, when it was beaten by Tammy Beaumont during the Ashes.

She played in each of the first seven Tests played by women, from the first women's Test against Australia in Brisbane in December 1934 to the seventh against Australia at The Oval in July 1937, where she narrowly missed scoring a second century, being dismissed for 99. She toured to Australia twice, in 1934–35 and 1948–49, and her efficient wicket-keeping was likened to Bert Oldfield. She scored 613 runs at a batting average of 40.86. Behind the stumps, she took 13 catches and 8 stumpings.

She played domestic cricket for various teams, including Winchester WCC, West of England, Hampshire and Lancashire.

== Later life ==
After her cricketing career, she retired to Colwall in Herefordshire to teach cricket and mathematics at The Elms School, where Michael Singleton was headmaster. She died in Colwall.
