= Kath Smith =

Australian cricketer

Personal information
- Full name: Kathleen Mary Smith
- Batting: Right-handed
- Bowling: Left-arm fast-medium

International information
- National side: Australia
- Test debut: 28 December 1934 v England
- Last Test: 10 July 1937 v England

Career statistics
Competition	WTest
Matches	6
Runs scored	335
Batting average	37.91
100s/50s	0/2
Top score	88
Balls bowled	1,050
Wickets	13
Bowling average	31.57
5 wickets in innings	0
10 wickets in match	0
Best bowling	4/57
Catches/stumpings	2/–
- Source: Cricinfo, 7 October 2014

Kathleen Mary Smith (16 October 1915 – 20 July 1993) was an Australian cricketer. Smith played six Test matches for the Australia national women's cricket team.

Smith was the sixth woman to play test cricket for Australia.

The Kath Smith Medal is named after Smith. It is awarded to the "best and fairest" women cricketer in Brisbane Grade Cricket. Cricket players who have won the medal include Melissa Bulow, Jude Coleman, Jess Jonassen and Delissa Kimmince
