= Peggy Antonio =

Australian cricketer (1917–2002)

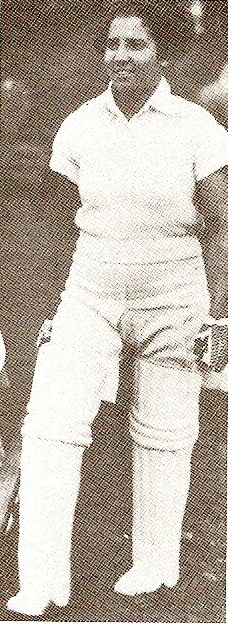

Personal information
- Born: 2 June 1917; Melbourne, Australia
- Died: 11 January 2002 (aged 84); Bundoora, Melbourne, Australia
- Batting: Right-handed
- Bowling: Right arm leg break googly
- Role: Bowler

International information
- National side: Australia
- Test debut (cap 10): 28 December 1934 v England
- Last Test: 13 July 1937 v England

Domestic team information
- Years: Team
- 1934–1935: Victoria Women

Career statistics
Competition	Test
Matches	6
Runs scored	128
Batting average	11.63
100s/50s	0/0
Top score	37
Balls bowled	990
Wickets	31
Bowling average	13.90
5 wickets in innings	3
10 wickets in match	0
Best bowling	6/49
Catches/stumpings	15/–
- Source: Cricinfo.com, 17 August 2007

Peggy Antonio (2 June 1917 – 11 January 2002) was an Australian women's Test cricketer, known as the "Girl Grimmett".

Antonio was raised in Port Melbourne, a working class suburb of Melbourne. Her father was a Chilean docker of French and Spanish descent who died when she was 15 months. With the encouragement of her uncle she learnt her cricket from the boys in her neighbourhood streets. As a young girl during the Great Depression, she was lucky enough to find work at a shoe factory in the industrial suburb of Collingwood. The factory was home to a women's cricket team where Antonio came to the attention of Eddie Conlon, a club cricketer with an encyclopaedic knowledge of the game. With the assistance of Conlon, Antonio developed a rare mix of leg spin and off spin, including a top spinner and a wrong'un.

She came to the attention of the Australian Women's Cricket Council and was invited to play for Victoria against the travelling English team. Taking 10/48, including the star batswoman, Molly Hide, she was selected to represent Australia in the inaugural women's Test match at the Brisbane Exhibition Ground at the age of 17. The first Australian to take a wicket in women's Test cricket, Antonio took twelve wickets in the three Test series and was considered suitable for a publicity date with the great Don Bradman.

Invited to tour England in 1937, the £75 passage was beyond the means of a shoe factory worker and her family. A campaign started and, due to the help from James McLeod, a businessman and an acquaintance of her late father, the necessary funds were raised to allow her to take her place in the squad. Antonio proved successful again on the tour taking 9/101 in the First Test at Northampton and 8/65 in the Second Test at Blackpool.

The final Test of the series at The Oval would be Antonio's last. Tiring of the grind and no longer finding the game enjoyable, she retired from cricket at the age of 20. In 1943 she married Eddie Howard, an Englishman resident in Australia, and settled down into domestic life, raising a large family. She died in Melbourne in 2002.
