= Australia women's national cricket team =

Australia
- Nickname: Southern Stars
- Association: Cricket Australia

Personnel
- Captain: Sophie Molineux
- Coach: Shelley Nitschke

History
- Test status acquired: 1934

International Cricket Council
- ICC status: Full member (1909)
- ICC region: East Asia-Pacific
ICC Rankings	Current	Best-ever
ODI	1st	1st (1 October 2015)
T20I	1st	1st (1 October 2015)

Tests
- First Test: v England at Brisbane Exhibition Ground, Brisbane; 28–31 December 1934
- Last Test: v India at WACA Ground, Perth; 6–8 March 2026
Tests	Played	Won/Lost
Total	81	24/11 (46 draws)
This year	1	1/0 (0 draws)

One Day Internationals
- First ODI: v Young England at Dean Park Cricket Ground, Bournemouth; 23 June 1973
- Last ODI: v Bangladesh at Allan Border Field, Brisbane; 14 October 2026
ODIs	Played	Won/Lost
Total	397	319/69 (2 ties, 7 no results)
This year	9	9/0 (0 ties, 0 no results)
- World Cup appearances: 12 (first in 1973)
- Best result: Champions (1978, 1982, 1988, 1997, 2005, 2013, 2022)

T20 Internationals
- First T20I: v England at County Ground, Taunton; 2 September 2005
- Last T20I: v New Zealand at North Sydney Oval, Sydney; 22 October 2026
T20Is	Played	Won/Lost
Total	216	152/54 (4 ties, 6 no results)
This year	16	13/2 (1 no result)
- T20 World Cup appearances: 10 (first in 2009)
- Best result: Champions (2010, 2012, 2014, 2018, 2020, 2023, 2026)
Test kit
ODI kit
T20I kit
- As of 22 October 2026

The Australian women's national cricket team, formerly known as the Southern Stars, represent Australia in international cricket. Currently captained by Sophie Molineux and coached by Shelley Nitschke, they are the top team in all world rankings assigned by the International Cricket Council.

Australia played their first Test match in 1934–35 against England. The two teams now compete biennially for the Women's Ashes. A rich history with New Zealand stretches back almost as far while strong rivalries have also developed more recently with India and the West Indies, manifesting predominantly via limited overs cricket. In the 50-over format of the game, Australia have won more World Cups than all other teams combined—capturing the 1978, 1982, 1988, 1997, 2005, 2013 and 2022 titles. They have achieved similarly emphatic success in Twenty20 cricket by winning the ICC Women's T20 World Cup in 2010, 2012, 2014, 2018, 2020, 2023 and 2026.

In 2003, Women's Cricket Australia (WCA) and the Australian Cricket Board (ACB) merged to form a single governing body, known as Cricket Australia (CA), which remains to this day. CA has expressed a major goal of the organisation is for cricket to be Australia's leading sport for women and girls, citing the performance and exposure of the national team—which is heavily dependent on its increasingly professional domestic structures, namely the Women's National Cricket League (WNCL) and the Women's Big Bash League (WBBL)—as a key factor to achieving such an aspiration.

A survey conducted by TrueNorth Research in April 2020 showed the national women's cricket team have the strongest emotional connection with Australian sports fans.

== History ==
=== Early years ===
Organised cricket has been played by women in Australia since no later than 1874 when the first recorded match took place in Bendigo. (Note: Although 1874 is widely acknowledged, some sources state 1855 as the year of the first recorded match.) Competitions have existed at state level since the early-1900s and at national level since 1931–32. The Australian Women's Cricket Council (AWCC) was formed in March 1931 to administer and develop the game at the national level. The original members of the AWCC were Victoria, New South Wales and Queensland. South Australia and Western Australia joined in 1934, while ACT and Tasmania affiliated in 1977 and 1982 respectively.

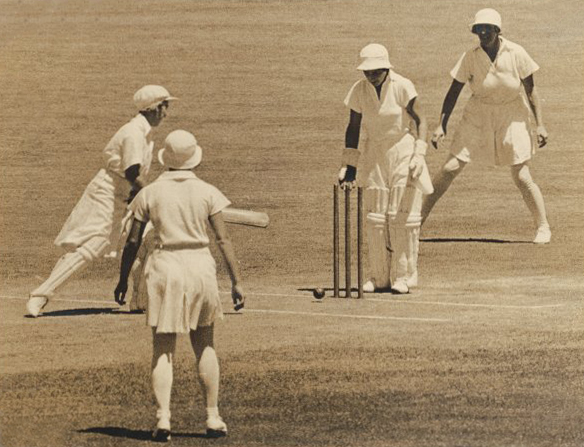
The SCG hosted the second Test match in women's cricket history.

England became the first international women's cricket team to visit Australia, touring in the summer of 1934–35 to compete in a series against an Australian team captained by Margaret Peden. Three Test matches—the first-ever involving women—were played during the series which received significant public and media interest. Men, in particular, were eager and curious to see the women play. The famous SCG barracker Yabba was quoted at the time: "The ladies are playing alright for me. This is cricket, this is… Leave the girls alone!" Following two losses, Australia eked out a draw in the third Test at the MCG with the spin bowling duo of Anne Palmer and Peggy Antonio proving to be among the team's standout performers.

After raising their own funds to travel to the United Kingdom, the Australian women's team embarked on a maiden overseas voyage in 1937. They proceeded to play 16 tour matches across England including three Tests—the first resulting in a narrow win which saw leg spinner Peggy Antonio dominate with the ball again while Kath Smith played a crucial all-round role. With the series level at 1–1, the third Test was played at The Oval and attracted a crowd of over 6,000 people. The match ended in a draw. Soon after Australia's landmark tour, the momentum of the burgeoning women's game was halted by the events of World War II.

=== 1947–1958: Wilson era ===
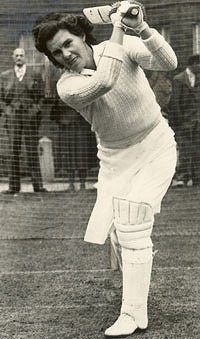
Betty Wilson was the first player to take ten wickets and score a century in the same Test.

International cricket resumed toward the end of the 1947–48 season when Australia visited New Zealand for the first time, comprehensively defeating the hosts in the only Test of the tour. The following summer, England returned to Australian shores and suffered their first series loss. Having already affirmed herself as a star of the team with a ten-wicket haul and an innings of 90 against New Zealand, all-rounder Betty Wilson led Australia to a 186-run victory in the first Test of the 1948–49 series over England, claiming match figures of 9/62 as well as scoring a century.

Australia's 1951 tour of England included one of the closest finishes to a women's Test match in the 20th century. The second Test, played in Worcester, was a tight battle as the Mollie Dive-led Australian team overcame a 39-run first innings deficit to successfully chase down a target of 160 on the final day of play with two wickets in hand. Though Wilson contributed key runs and wickets as anticipated, it was ultimately the all-round performance of fast bowler Norma Whiteman (who finished the match with a defiant knock of 36 not out) which guided the team across the line. Both players were also standouts in the Third test, though England nevertheless triumphed by 137 runs to end the three-match series at 1–1.

England's next tour of Australia produced several notable milestones, particularly during the first Test of the drawn 1957–58 series. The match, played at the Junction Oval in Melbourne, marked the first time international cricket was broadcast on Australian television. Betty Wilson was once again an inimitable force throughout the topsy-turvy contest, which ultimately ended in a draw, becoming the first player to take ten wickets (Note: Wilson finished with match bowling figures of eleven wickets for 16 runs.) and score a century in the same Test. In another historic breakthrough, Faith Thomas made her debut in the match, becoming the first Indigenous person to represent Australia in any national sporting team.

=== 1958–1973: Establishment of the IWCC ===
Australia became a member of the International Women's Cricket Council (IWCC) at its inception in 1958, helping to form the governing body alongside England, the Netherlands, New Zealand and South Africa. Lack of funds and low public interest throughout the 1960s caused the women's game, once again, to decline. The on-field fortunes of the Australian team were simultaneously grim, as they finished the decade with a streak of eleven winless Test matches.

They were not successful in the early-1970s and had their first-ever Test mach loss to New Zealand. Mary Allitt, who captained the national team for the 1963 tour of England, was awarded the Medal of the Order of Australia in June 2007. When she died in 2013, Cricket Australia CEO James Sutherland said Allitt helped to "pave the way for today's elite players" and that she "holds a significant place in the history of women's cricket."

One of the longest-serving players and administrators for women's cricket during this period was Lorna Thomas. Retiring as a cricketer in the late 1950s, Thomas took up team management which included overseeing four tours abroad. She retired from her position as manager of the New South Wales and Australian teams in the 1970s and was awarded an MBE for services to cricket.

=== 1973–1991: Introduction of One Day cricket ===
The team attracted sponsors with the help of the first World Cup in 1973, which served as an introduction to the One Day International (ODI) format for women's cricket. Australia finished the tournament as runners-up, losing to host nation England in the final. The number of tours, both overseas and at home, increased soon thereafter. Healthy finances allowed for investment in more suitable training and coaching, and these initiatives were vindicated with the team achieving global domination by the 1980s.

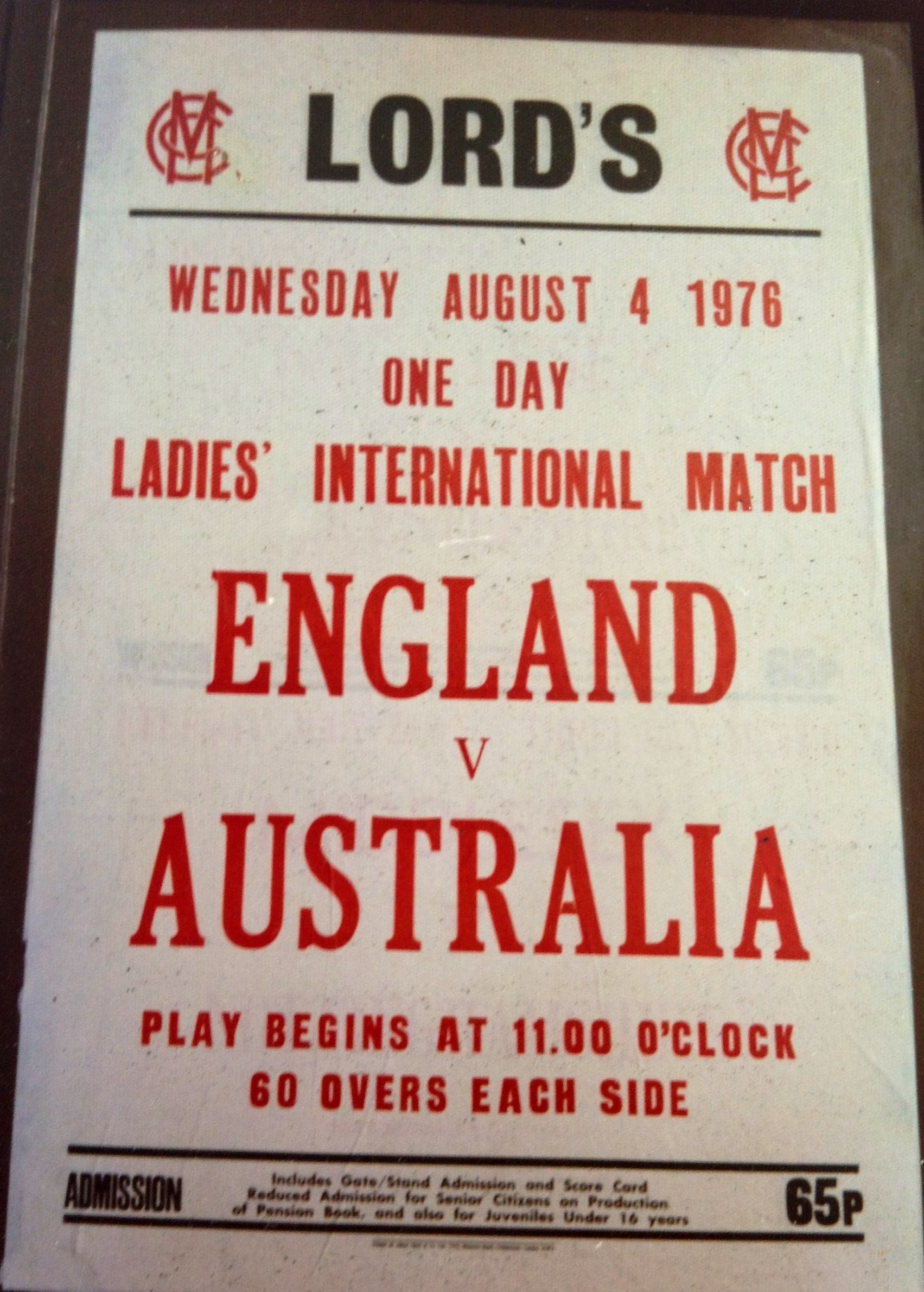
A billboard from 1976 promotes the first-ever women's cricket match played at Lord's. Australia lost the ODI to England by eight wickets.

India paid a maiden visit in 1976–77, playing one Test match in Perth which resulted in Australia's first victory in the longest form of the game in nearly two decades, marking the beginning of the team's turnaround. The following year, at the 1978 World Cup, Australia defeated England in the final to claim a breakthrough world championship. Captain Margaret Jennings led the team in its triumphant campaign while Sharon Tredrea had a significant impact with bat and ball throughout the tournament which was held in India before crowds of up to 40,000 people.

Australia successfully defended their crown at the 1982 World Cup, held in New Zealand, by beating England in the final again. Making their ODI debuts at the start of the tournament, batter Jill Kennare was the leading run-scorer for the team while Lyn Fullston took the most wickets of all players. A talented all-rounder who also represented her country in netball, Fullston was a notable embodiment of two Australian team member archetypes: the prolific left-arm orthodox spinner (paralleled by several successors, including Shelley Nitschke and Jess Jonassen) and the elite dual-sport athlete (further exemplified by the likes of Ellyse Perry and Jess Duffin).

A dogged English team toured in 1984–85, pulling ahead early in a five-match Test series with a come-from-behind five-run win. Not only did Australia respond resoundingly throughout the remainder of the summer to wrap up a 2–1 series victory, it would take more than 20 years to pass before England would record another Test match victory against their arch-rivals. The fifth Test, played at Queen Elizabeth Oval, saw Australian captain Raelee Thompson—in her last season with the national team—take 5/33 on the first day of play to help set up a seven-wicket win for her country. Jill Kennare and Denise Emerson were key performers with the bat throughout the series.

Australia completed a three-peat at the 1988 World Cup, defeating England in the final by eight wickets. Despite recording the significant achievement on home soil at the Melbourne Cricket Ground, the match was played in front of just 3,000 people. In another indicator of the development that lay ahead for the women's game, the rate of scoring during the tournament was typically very slow compared to modern ODI standards—in the final, for example, England scored a mere 7/127 from 60 overs while Australia chased down the target in the 45th over.

=== 1991–2005: Clark era ===
==== 1993 World Cup ====
The decade-long global dominance of Australia had undoubtedly petered out by the 1993 World Cup when the team finished the group stage in third place, thus failing to qualify for the final. The ultimate blow arguably occurred in their last pool match, suffering a brutal ten-wicket loss to New Zealand after being bowled out for 77. In many respects, however, it also signified the start of an even more fruitful chapter in the team's history. While several core group members, such as Lyn Larsen and Denise Annetts, retired from international cricket at the conclusion of the tournament or soon after, the next generation of stars had already begun to cement themselves at the top level—most famously Belinda Clark and Zoe Goss. The following year, Goss also helped spark an unprecedented amount of attention around the women's game when she dismissed Brian Lara during a charity match at the Sydney Cricket Ground.

By 1995, with Clark having taken the reins of captaincy in the previous year, more cornerstones of a soon-to-be-ominous outfit had been added in batter Karen Rolton and coach John Harmer. A biomechanics expert by trade, Harmer advocated for an exciting and enjoyable approach from his players: "After my first tour of New Zealand, I took them aside and said, 'This is so boring, sitting here, watching you lot play. You're scoring at 1.5 an over. That's not cricket. Make runs, take wickets, make the play and do it with a smile on your face.'" In another shift for the game, the inaugural Women's National Cricket League (WNCL) season was held in the summer of 1996–97. Superseding the Australian Women's Cricket Championships which had taken place in a two-week tournament format since 1930–31, the annual WNCL competition enabled a much greater amount of cricket between the country's state teams in order to better develop players and maximise their chances of achieving success at international level.

==== 1997 World Cup ====
The Southern Stars, as they were formerly known, have been sponsored by the Commonwealth Bank since 1999.

Australia completed one of their most devastating line-ups ever with the emergence of fast bowler Cathryn Fitzpatrick. Having drifted in and out of the team during the early and mid 1990s, Fitzpatrick found the beginning of a rich and extensive vein of form just in time for the 1997 World Cup in India. The Australians went through the group matches of the tournament undefeated, thrashing teams regardless of their historical strength on the world stage. Not only did they defeat Denmark by 363 runs (which included a record innings of 229 not out by Belinda Clark) and bowled out Pakistan for 27, they also chased down totals set by England and South Africa with half-an-innings to spare. The knockout stage proved to be more closely contested, though Australia nevertheless accounted for India and then New Zealand to reclaim the world championship. The final, played at Eden Gardens, attracted an estimated crowd of at least 50–60,000 people. Triumphant captain Clark has cited the scenes in the aftermath of the match as a career highlight: "Our victory lap is still etched in my memory, because we were being cheered like a home team. For us to win there was extremely special."

The returning champions would be paraded around the SCG for a lap of honour during the 1997–98 New Year's Test, after which it was revealed they were going to have to pay for their trip. "There was a levy that we were supposed to pay after the 1997 World Cup, around about $1800 each," Fitzpatrick explained in a retrospective interview, "but because of all the media around what we'd done, a Bendigo publican stepped forward and said 'nope, that's not good enough' and said he'd pay it. So, this guy we'd never met wiped the debt for all of us. It was fantastic." Clark concurred: "I've never met him, but this guy clearly said 'this isn't right' and paid all our invoices, which we thought was awesome." The following year, the Commonwealth Bank became a sponsor of the national women's team after the daughter of CEO David Murray participated in a school clinic (run by Belinda Clark) and became enamoured with cricket. The partnership between the Commonwealth Bank and women's cricket in Australia continues to this day.

==== "The Women's Ashes" ====
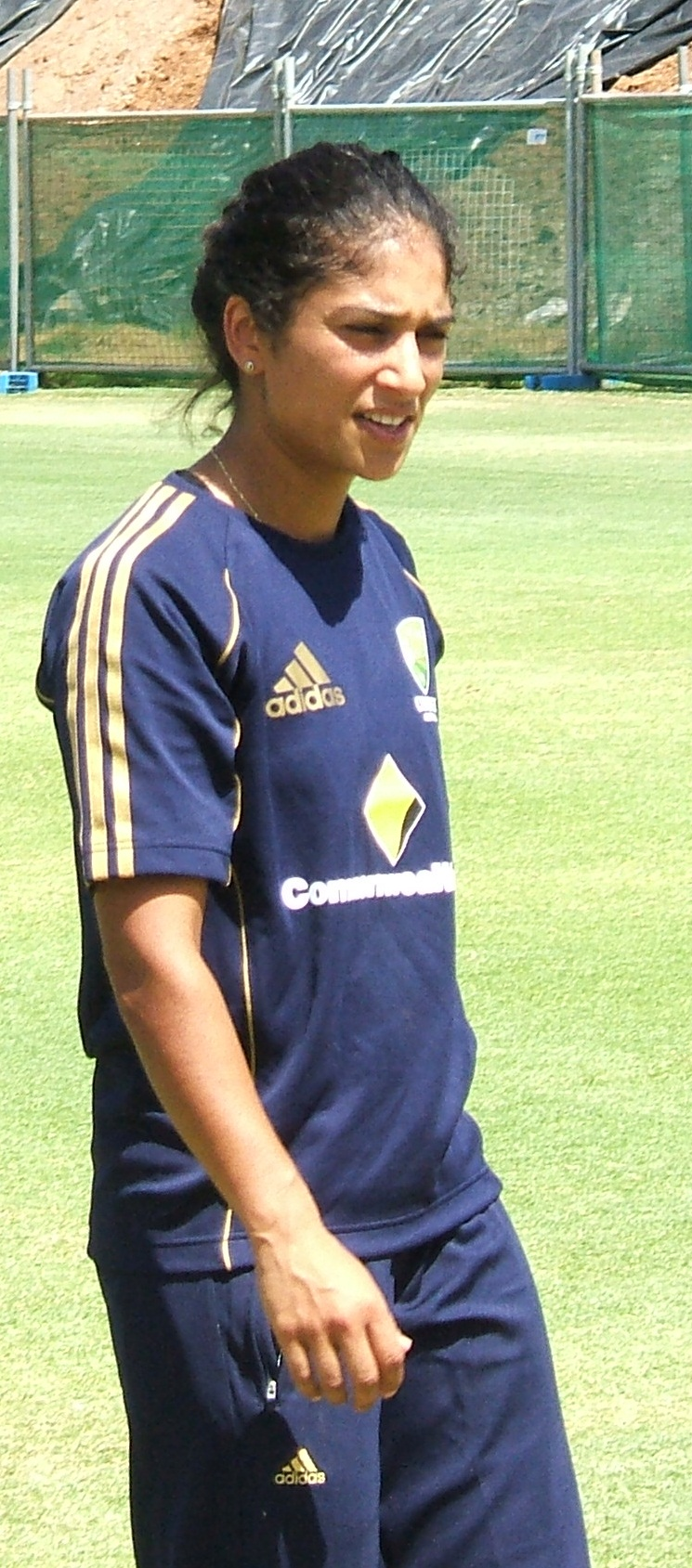
Lisa Sthalekar debuted for Australia in 2001. She became the first woman in the world to take 100 ODI wickets while scoring 1,000 ODI runs.

64 years into a fierce rivalry, Test series between Australia and England were officially designated as "the Women's Ashes" in 1998, derived from the name of the male equivalent. Under the new moniker, the series immediately witnessed a new feat when Joanne Broadbent became the first Australia woman to score a Test double century. Surprisingly, her innings of 200 lasted as a national team record for less than three years, surpassed by Michelle Goszko during the 2001 Women's Ashes. In a further unexpected twist, Karen Rolton topped Goszko's benchmark of 204 merely two weeks later with a then-record score of 209 not out.

In late 2001, Women's Cricket Australia and the Australian Cricket Board made the decision to trial the integration of the two organisations, following similar recent initiatives by New Zealand Cricket and the England and Wales Cricket Board. The merger was completed in 2003, resulting in the governing body now known as Cricket Australia, and has been regarded as a positive influence on women's cricket, providing more financial support and gathering more exposure for the sport.

==== 2005 World Cup ====
Australia's next major triumph occurred at the 2005 World Cup in South Africa. Having lost the final of the 2000 World Cup in a nail-biter against host team New Zealand, they proceeded to go undefeated in what was a successful campaign of redemption. Shelley Nitschke and Lisa Sthalekar proved to be invaluable all-round additions to the team, while Karen Rolton became the first player to score a century in the knockout stage of a Women's Cricket World Cup by making 107 not out in the final against India. The victory was among the last few appearances Belinda Clark made for Australia, retiring as the country's most prolific scorer in Women's ODIs later that year. She went on to have arguably an even greater impact off the field, serving as an executive for Cricket Australia and helping to transform top-flight women's cricket from an amateur sport into a professional one. Reiterating her distinguished standing in the game, the pre-eminent individual award in Australian women's cricket was named in Clark's honour in 2013.

=== 2005–2015: Introduction of Twenty20 cricket ===
==== Rolton captaincy ====
The IWCC was officially integrated with the International Cricket Council (ICC) after the 2005 World Cup, promising to result in "greater media exposure and publicity" for the women's game than ever before. Later that year, Australia's 15-match undefeated streak in Tests against England was broken when they lost by six wickets in Worcester. The team's tour of the United Kingdom concluded in Taunton by playing in their first-ever Twenty20 International (T20I) fixture. An innings of 96 not out by Karen Rolton helped the Australians to recover from 3/6, successfully chasing down a target of 153 with seven wickets in hand and 14 balls remaining.

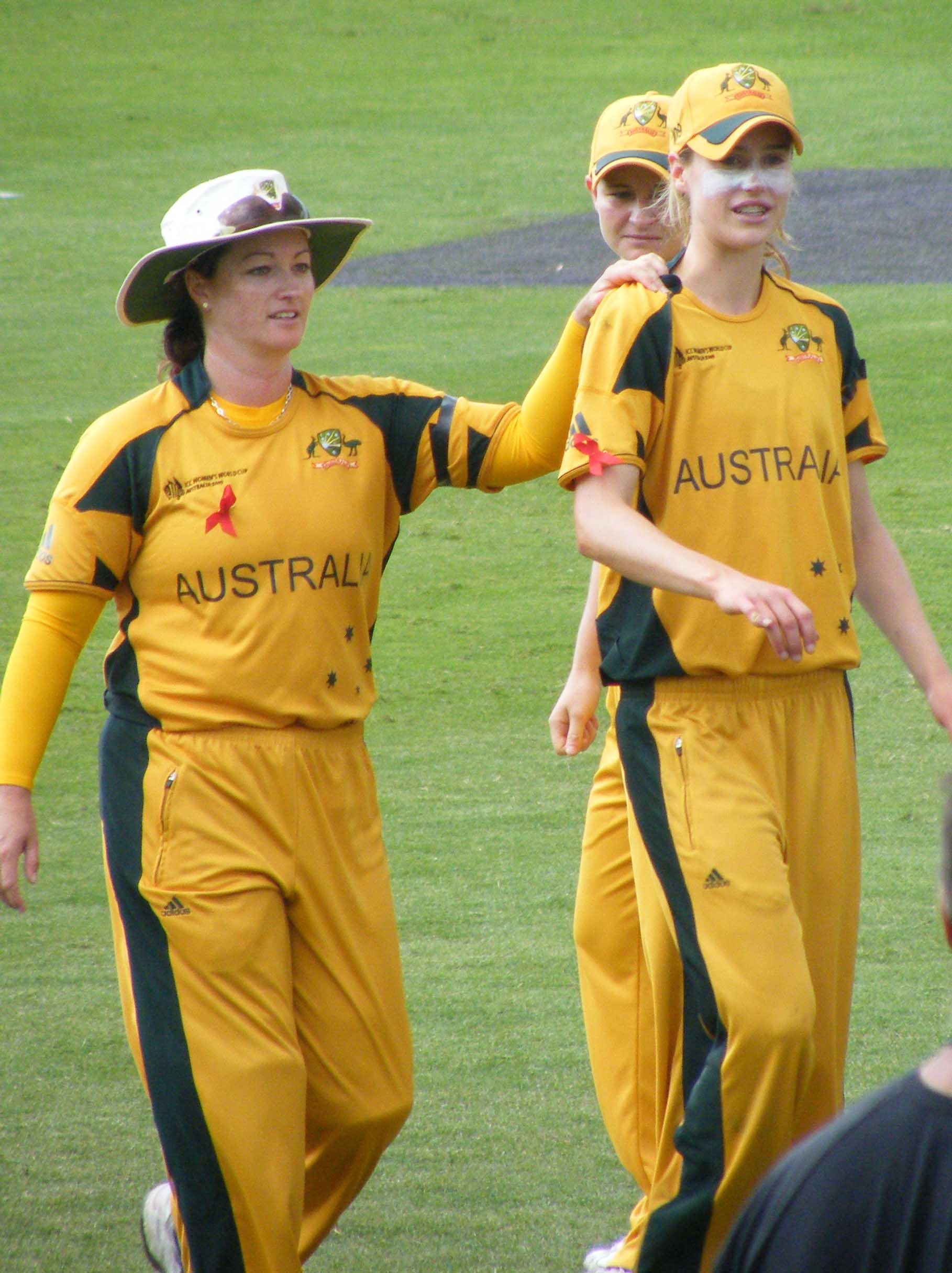
Karen Rolton and Ellyse Perry at the 2009 World Cup

Following the retirement of Belinda Clark, the unsurprising appointment of Karen Rolton as the new Australian captain occurred in early 2006. Rolton's tenure oversaw a challenging transition period in the team's history as the careers of several players from the '90s zenith line-up came to a close—in particular, Cathryn Fitzpatrick made her last appearance for Australia in the final of the 2006–07 Quadrangular Series. Fitzpatrick retired as the world's leading wicket-taker in Women's ODIs at the time and as her country's second-most prolific wicket-taker in Women's Tests behind Betty Wilson. Searching to fill the immense void left by the departure of their premier fast bowler, selectors looked to the future by turning to a 16-year-old Ellyse Perry who would play her first ODI for the team in July 2007. Headlines around Perry's record-breaking debut age were quickly followed up with news of her debut for the national women's soccer team just two weeks later, though interest in the young all-rounder reached a new high in February 2008 when she delivered a Player of the Match performance against England in her maiden T20I.

Australia hosted the 2009 World Cup and entered the tournament as favourites, but their performance fell well short of expectations and the team finished in fourth place. Later in the year, at the inaugural Women's T20 World Cup held in England, they were defeated by the host nation in the semi-finals. The following month, Karen Rolton made her last appearance for Australia during the only Test of the 2009 Women's Ashes. After making a duck in the first innings, Rolton compiled 31 on the third day of play to become the only Australian woman to score 1,000 career runs in Test cricket. The match ended in a draw despite a commanding innings of 139 by Jodie Fields, who had already assumed the captaincy from Rolton at the conclusion of the World Twenty20 tournament.

==== 2010 World Twenty20 ====
The fortunes of the team proceeded to turn around completely within ten months, culminating in triumph at the 2010 World Twenty20 tournament, held in the West Indies. Australia defeated New Zealand in a thrilling final which was ultimately clinched by Ellyse Perry's fielding off her own bowling on the last delivery. Opposition batter Sophie Devine struck a powerful straight drive back down the pitch, threatening to result in a match-tying four runs, but Perry instinctively stuck out her right foot and successfully stopped the ball from reaching the boundary. Following Australia's maiden T20 world title, the prospects of the team became even brighter with Meg Lanning's inclusion during the summer of 2010–11. A prodigious batting talent, Lanning became the country's youngest-ever centurion at 18 years and 288 days by scoring 104 against England in just her second ODI appearance.

==== Coach Fitzpatrick era ====
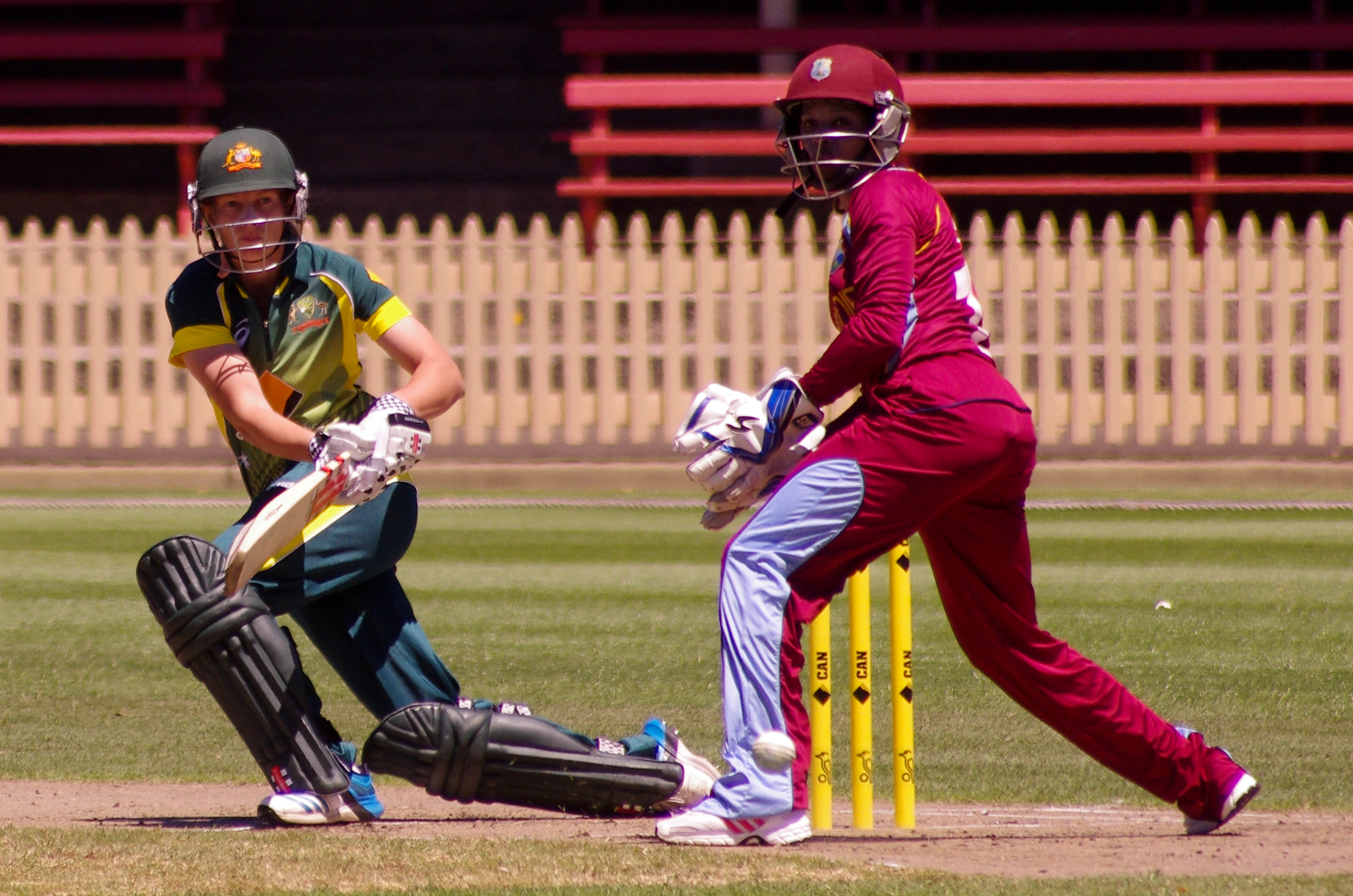
Meg Lanning became the captain of Australia in 2014.

In early 2012, Shelley Nitschke claimed a fourth-consecutive Belinda Clark Award (presented annually to the team's best player) soon after her retirement. Then, in May, Cathryn Fitzpatrick was appointed as Australia's new head coach. Fitzpatrick's stint at the helm was an extremely productive one which resulted in successful campaigns at the 2012 World Twenty20, the 2013 World Cup and the 2014 World Twenty20 tournaments. Due to timely contributions with the bat, Jess Duffin garnered a reputation as a big game performer during the first two of the three events, earning Player of the Final honours on both occasions. Meanwhile, Lisa Sthalekar capped off a stellar career with a fairytale ending at the 50-over championship in India, incidentally her country of birth. Adopted at three weeks old by an American family, Sthalekar overcame unlikely odds to become the second woman to take 100 career ODI wickets for Australia. She was also the first player in the world to achieve the double of 100 wickets and 1,000 runs in Women's ODIs.

Ahead of the 2013 Women's Ashes, the series structure was changed to a points-based system where matches would include ODIs and T20Is alongside the traditional Test format. England would go on to win convincingly on home soil, and they would retain the trophy more controversially in their expedited Australian tour of 2013–14. Despite winning both limited overs legs of the series, Australia still missed out on regaining the trophy due to losing the Test match, prompting a tweak to the points system for future editions. In the latter portion of the series, an injured Jodie Fields was temporarily replaced as captain of the T20I team by 21-year-old Meg Lanning. This replacement became permanent ahead of the T20 championship in 2014.

Along Australia's journey to achieving a World Twenty20 three-peat, Lanning would blast 126 runs against Ireland to set a new world record for the highest score in Women's T20Is. Two months later, she was named captain of the national team in all three formats. The appointment was reported as a "messy" handover from incumbent Fields who subsequently retired from international cricket despite urges from Australian selectors to reconsider. More leadership changes soon followed as Cathryn Fitzpatrick decided to step down from her role as head coach in March 2015.

=== 2015–present: Beginning of the professional era ===
==== Mott appointed coach ====
Ahead of the 2015 Women's Ashes, Matthew Mott was appointed as the team's new coach. Australia won the series for the first time since the introduction of the points system, set up by an impressive Test win at the St Lawrence Ground. Jess Jonassen starred with the bat while Ellyse Perry tore through the English line-up with the ball on the last day of play to help record a 161-run victory. Back home, increased investment in the game began to take hold with the establishment of the Women's Big Bash League (WBBL). Domestic women's T20 cricket in the country had previously been played via the Australian Women's Twenty20 Cup in which state squads were drawn from the seven-team WNCL competition. Cricket Australia made the strategic decision to pivot and expand to a women's T20 equivalent of the eight-team model that had already been introduced to the men's game in the form of the Big Bash League (BBL), aiming to further heighten the profile and professionalism of elite-level female cricket.

Despite initial promising signs, the Mott–Lanning regime was soon on shaky ground after the team suffered shock defeats at two major events in as many years. They lost a tightly contested final to the West Indies at the 2016 World Twenty20, and were then unceremoniously knocked out of the 2017 World Cup via a semi-final upset at the hands of India. Australia's troubles were exacerbated by a shoulder injury to Lanning, who missed several games of the latter tournament and would undergo surgery soon after, sidelining her for six months.

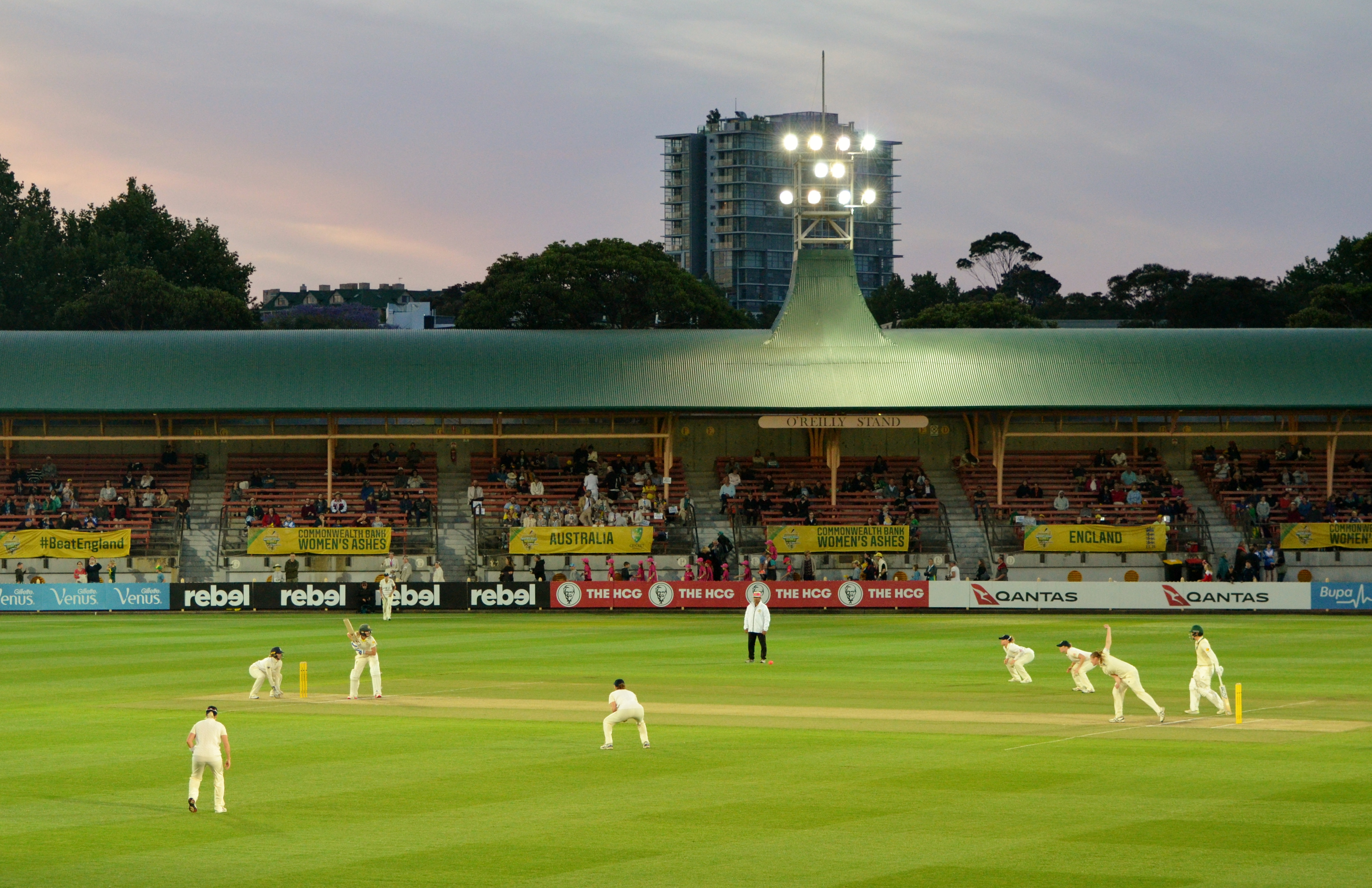
The first-ever women's day/night Test was played at North Sydney Oval in 2017.

==== Landmark pay deal, Southern Stars moniker discontinued ====
With Lanning set to miss the 2017–18 Women's Ashes, Rachael Haynes stepped in as acting captain and the team retained the trophy via an inconsistent performance across the drawn series. As part of the series, the first-ever women's day/night Test was held at North Sydney Oval, which ended in a draw. The match was also particularly notable for Ellyse Perry's record-breaking innings of 213 not out, the highest score by an Australian in women's Tests.

Continuing to overhaul its approach to the women's game, Cricket Australia announced in June 2017 that the Southern Stars moniker—an official title of the team for several years—would be discontinued, thereby mirroring the nickname-free national men's team. Then, in August, CA announced it would increase total female player payments from $7.5 million to $55.2 million, with the deal hailed as the biggest pay rise in the history of women's sport in Australia. The on-field performance of the national team began to skyrocket in the wake of this watershed moment.

Additionally boosted by the return of their captain, Australia quickly embarked on an extended winning streak in ODI matches and T20I series. They proceeded to win the 2018 World Twenty20, held in the West Indies, with a comprehensive defeat of England in the final which followed a dominant bowling and fielding display throughout the campaign as well as a Player of the Tournament performance by wicket-keeper Alyssa Healy. The gap between the Australians and other cricketing nations appeared to have widened even further by the following year when they crushed England in the 2019 Women's Ashes. Underlining the lopsided nature of the series, several individual records were achieved such as Ellyse Perry claiming the best-ever bowling figures by an Australian woman in ODIs, and Meg Lanning setting a new record for the highest score in a Women's T20I innings for the second time in her career.

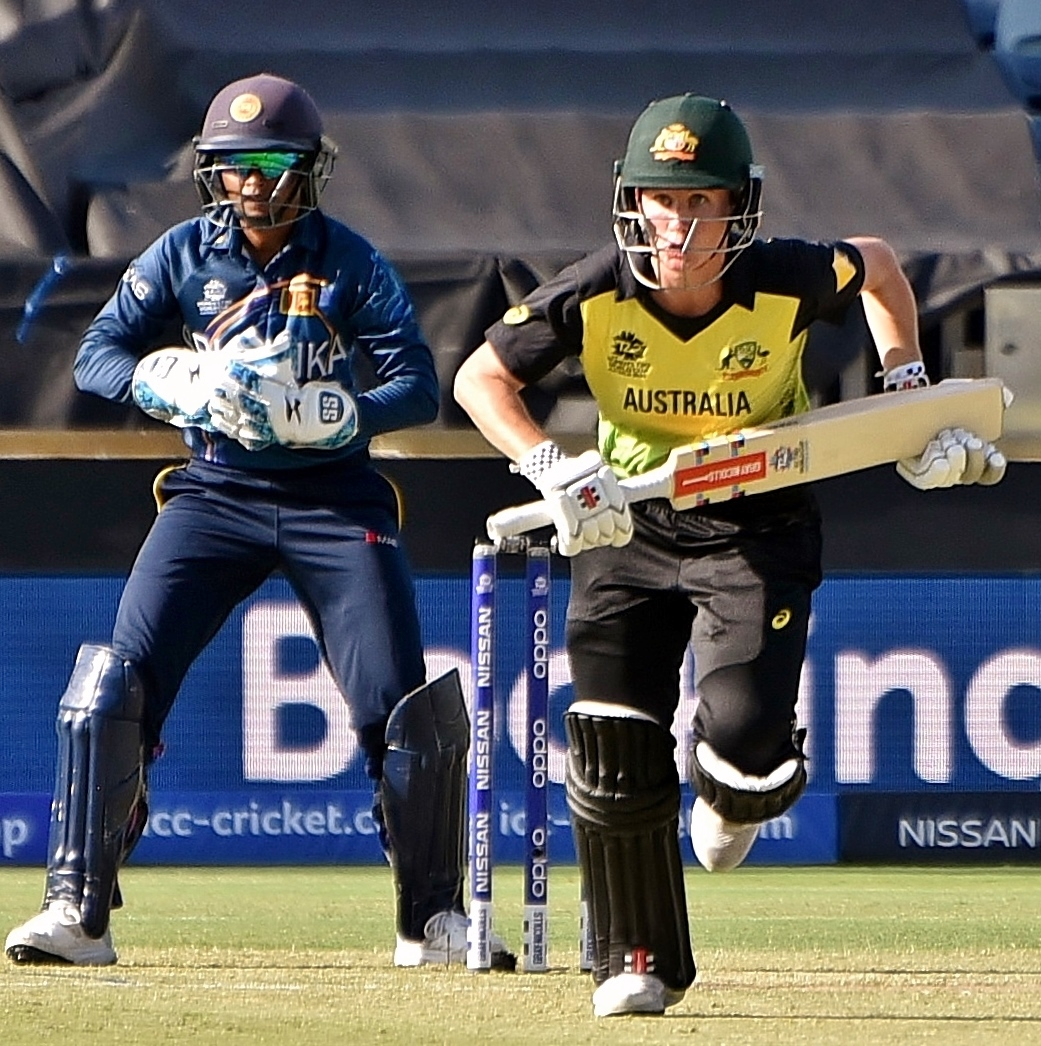
Beth Mooney was named Player of the Tournament at the 2020 T20 World Cup.

==== 2020 T20 World Cup ====
Australia quickly turned their attention to the 2020 T20 World Cup, to be held on home soil, which was scheduled as a standalone event from the men's counterpart. With the final fixtured at the Melbourne Cricket Ground, a media campaign urging fans to "Fill the MCG" ensued. Although this generated a great deal of public interest in the campaign, it also placed a heavy weight of expectation on the team, given that they still had to win their way through to the last night of the tournament. An early loss to India, a scare against underdog Sri Lanka, and a mounting list of injuries to key players ensured Australia's road to the final would not be easy. At one stage, their fate rested entirely on favourable weather, with their must-win semi-final encounter at the SCG against South Africa threatening to be washed out. The rain-reduced match, which was interrupted by several delays, eventually went ahead with Australia claiming a narrow victory and booking their place in the final.

Australia women's undefeated ODI series streak (2017–2023)
#	Series	Result
1	England 2017–18	2–1
2	India 2017–18	3–0
3	Pakistan 2018–19	3–0
4	New Zealand 2018–19	3–0
5	England 2019	3–0
6	West Indies 2019–20	3–0
7	Sri Lanka 2019–20	3–0
8	New Zealand 2020–21	3–0
9	New Zealand 2020–21	3–0
10	India 2021–22	2–1
11	England 2021–22	3–0
12	2022 World Cup	9–0
13	Pakistan 2022–23	3–0
14	England 2023	1–2
Total		44–4

Producing their best performance of the campaign in the championship decider, Australia defeated India by 85 runs to claim their first T20 World title on home soil. Following an onslaught by the team's batters, the bowling unit led by Jess Jonassen and Megan Schutt restricted the opposition to a low total with the support of a flawless team effort in the field. Beth Mooney's consistent run-compiling form earned her the Player of the Tournament award. A record women's cricket crowd of 86,174 was in attendance for the final which media outlets described as a "landmark night" and a "game changer". Later in the year, in acknowledgment of the history-making occasion, the national women's cricket team won The Don Award—widely considered the highest honour in Australian sport which is awarded to the athlete or team judged to have most inspired the nation through their performance and example. Son of Sir Donald Bradman and namesake of The Don Award, John Bradman presented the award to the team, saying: "I have no doubt that my dad would have been absolutely thrilled with this result." Greta Bradman added: "I was there when the team won the T20 World Cup, and it was an emotional day. My grandfather would be so proud of where cricket is today and would be thrilled to know that the whole team is being awarded The Don Award."

After a hiatus caused by the COVID-19 pandemic, Australia returned to the international cricket stage by hosting New Zealand in September 2020. During the tour, they recorded their 21st-consecutive ODI victory, equalling the world record set by the Ricky Ponting-led Australian men's team in 2003. On 4 April 2021, they managed their 22nd-consecutive ODI victory (again beating New Zealand) to claim the record outright. The streak extended to 26 victories before coming to an end via a two-wicket loss at Great Barrier Reef Arena in the last ODI of India's 2021–22 tour.

Australia women's undefeated T20I series streak (2018–2023)
#	Series	Result
1	India/England 2017–18	4–1
2	New Zealand 2018–19	3–0
3	Pakistan 2018–19	3–0
4	2018 World Cup	5–1
5	England 2019	2–1
6	West Indies 2019–20	3–0
7	Sri Lanka 2019–20	3–0
8	England/India 2019–20	3–2
9	2020 World Cup	5–1
10	New Zealand 2020–21	2–1
11	New Zealand 2020–21	1–1 (Note: Also recorded 1 No Result)
12	India 2021–22	2–0
13	England 2021–22	1–0 (Note: Also recorded 2 No Results)
14	Ireland/Pakistan 2022	2–0
15	2022 C'wealth Games	5–0
16	India 2022–23	4–1
17	Pakistan 2022–23	2–0
18	2023 World Cup	6–0
19	England 2023	1–2
Total		57–11 (Note: Also recorded 7 No Results)

==== 2022 World Cup ====
The only Test of the 2021–22 Women's Ashes, played at Manuka Oval, ended in a "dramatic draw" and was hailed for its "thrilling finish". Seven Network analyst Lisa Sthalekar called it "the greatest Test match that I have been... involved in", while Fox Cricket commentator Isa Guha described it as "one of the greatest Test matches in Ashes history". Having set England an unlikely target of 257 runs from 48 overs on the final day of play, Australia rallied late and took 6/26 in less than six overs to be one wicket away from sealing the win with a mere 13 balls remaining in the match. The visitors managed to survive through to stumps, twelve runs short of a winning total, hence both teams falling just short of victory while also narrowly escaping defeat. Australia proceeded to close out the series with a 12–4 score line, wrapping it up with three consecutive ODI wins and depriving England of a single victory for the entire tour.

In the following two months, Australia went through the 2022 Women's Cricket World Cup undefeated, culminating in a 71-run win against England at Hagley Oval. With the team claiming a seventh 50-over title and winning 40 of 42 ODIs since their shock semi-final exit in 2017, cricket.com.au's Laura Jolly said the triumph was "the crowning moment of a five-year journey of redemption". In the championship decider, Alyssa Healy recorded the highest score in a World Cup final innings with 170 runs from 138 balls.

==== Nitschke appointed coach ====
In May 2022, Matthew Mott departed to take on the head coach role of the England men's limited overs team. Shelley Nitschke was subsequently elevated from her assistant coach position to interim head coach. Australia then went undefeated throughout the T20 tournament at the 2022 Commonwealth Games, beating India in the final at Edgbaston by nine runs. The following month, Nitschke was confirmed as the permanent head coach of the team. Australia recorded 24 victories throughout the year—their only loss occurred in December during a five-match T20I tour of India, wherein the hosts won the second game of the series via a Super Over.

Australia completed another hat-trick of world titles by defeating South Africa in the championship decider of the 2023 ICC Women's T20 World Cup, played at Newlands Cricket Ground. Beth Mooney was named Player of the Final (an honour she also earned six months earlier at the Commonwealth Games), while Ashleigh Gardner was named Player of the Tournament for her all-round performance. Arguably the most memorable moment of the campaign came in the semi-final against India when Australia pulled off a "remarkable fightback with the ball" to secure a five-run victory which Meg Lanning described as "one of the best wins I have been involved in."

== Uniform ==
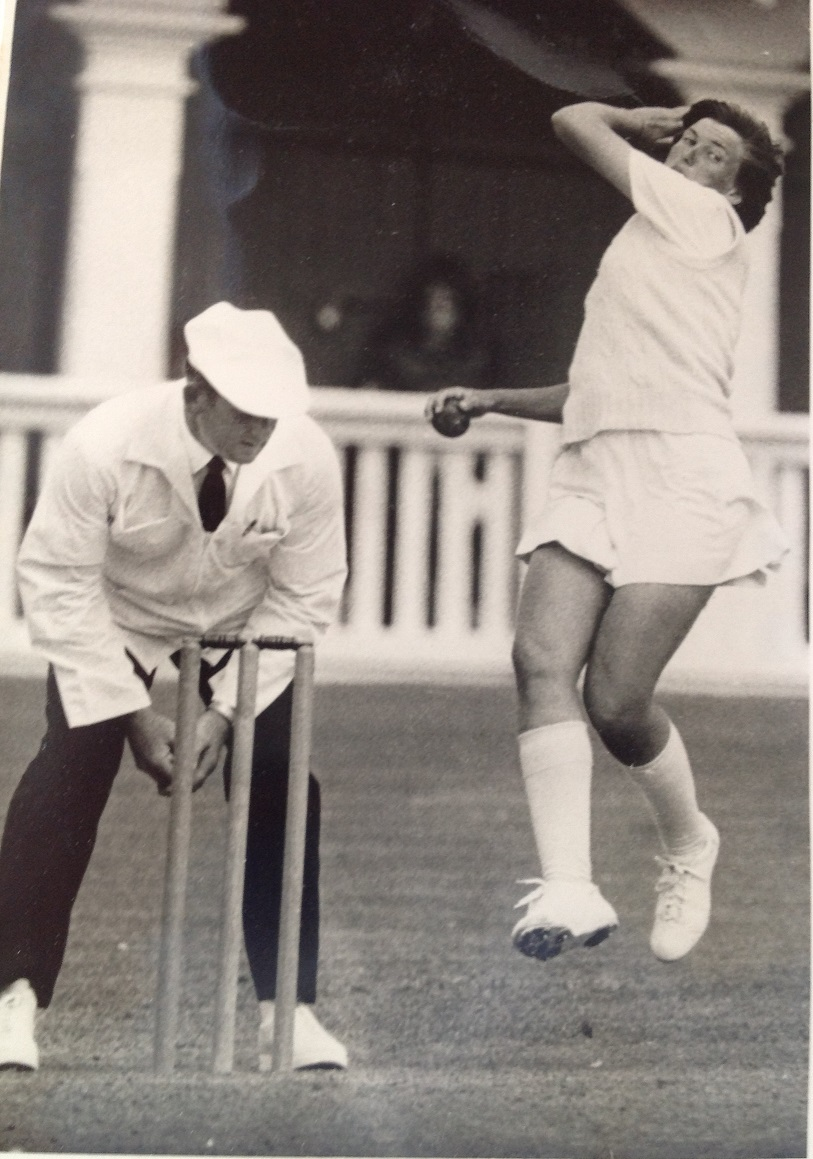
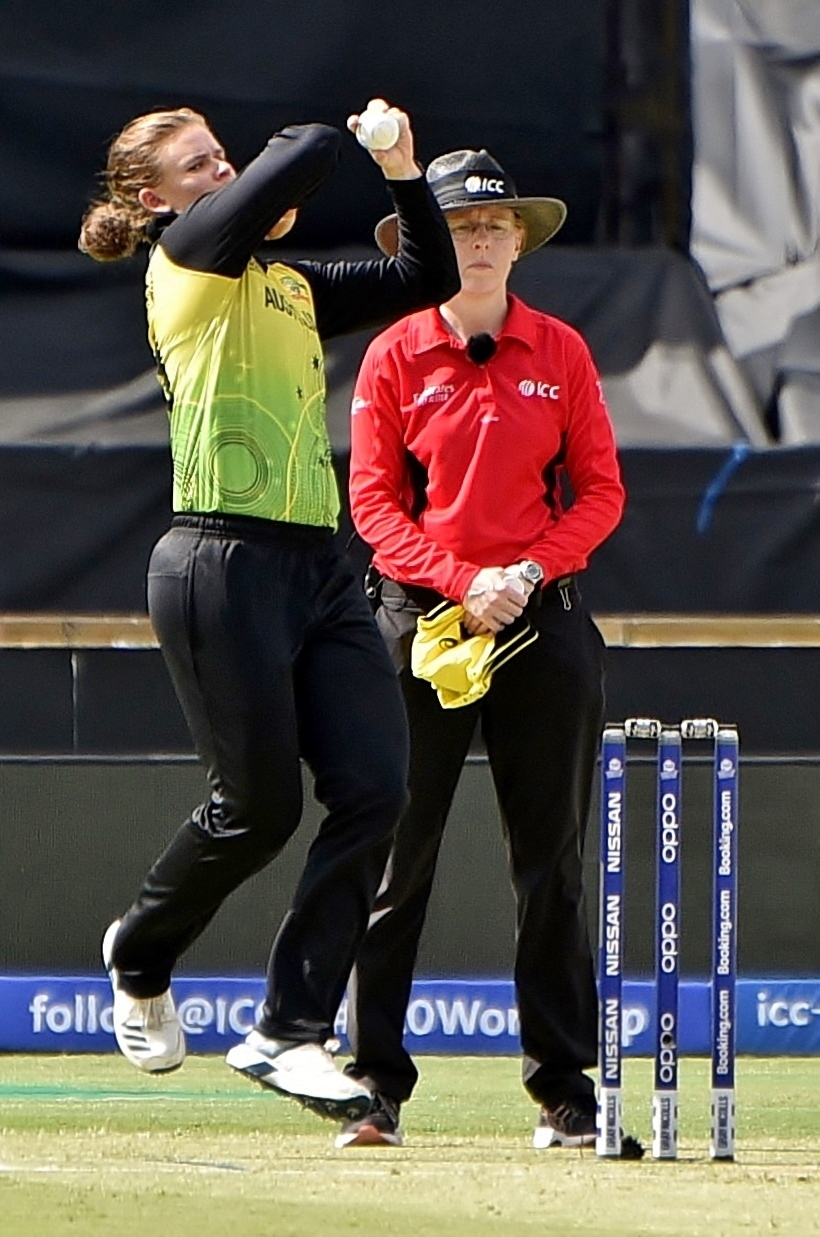
Patsy May in 1971 and Jess Jonassen in 2020 sporting the standard style of their day

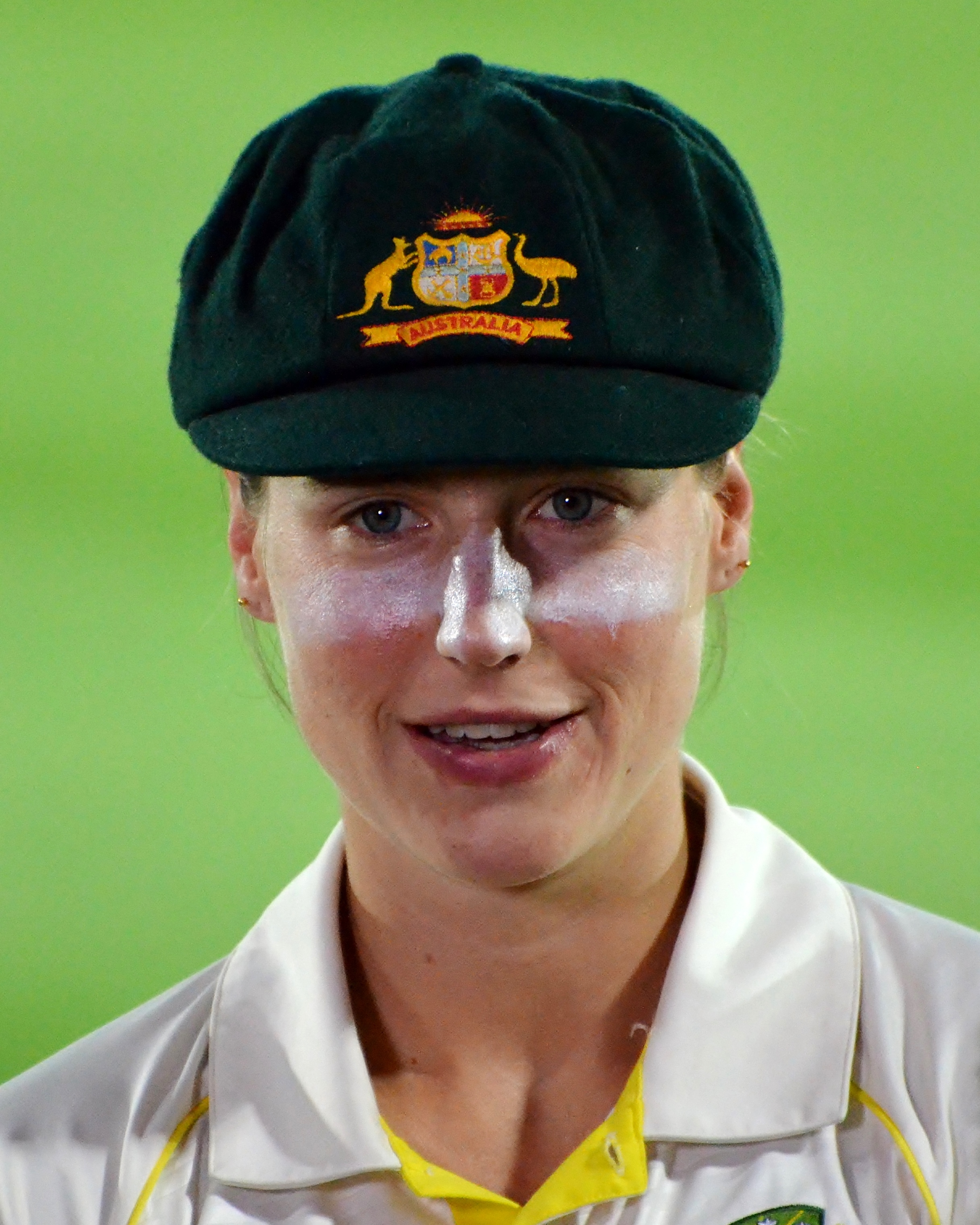
Ellyse Perry wearing the women's baggy green, with red text on a gold background

For most of the 20th century, the typical playing attire for female cricketers included skirts or culottes worn with long socks. This deviation from the men's game, in which trousers were standard issue, ended in 1997. The existence and subsequent extinction of the now-infamous culottes, paired with the players previously having to pay out of their own pocket for the unfortunate fashion trend, has been cited as a symbol of the shift from the amateur to professional era in women's cricket.

The uniform of the Australian women's team now usually closely resembles that of the national men's team—classic cricket whites and a baggy green cap for Tests, the iconic canary yellow outfit for ODIs (though a predominantly green design was worn for a period in the early 2000s), and often a mostly black ensemble for T20Is—with the main differences found in subtle tapering to better fit the female form where necessary, as well as relevant changes to sponsor logos. An additional small difference can be spotted on the coat of arms (which appears on the baggy green among other items of apparel), wherein the colours of the scroll and the "Australia" motto are reversed from red and gold for the men's team to gold and red for the women's team.

In February 2020, for the first time, the team wore an Indigenous-themed uniform design (featuring artwork created by Aboriginal artists) in a T20I match against England.

== Team song ==
The team song is sung by the players after every victory. Unlike the men's team, which sings Under the Southern Cross I Stand, the women sing their own song to the tune of the Notre Dame Victory March.

Cheer, Cheer the green and the gold,
We are courageous, mighty and bold,
We've got what it takes to win,
Nothing can make this team give in,
We are Australia and we are proud,
Sing it with passion, shout it out loud,
When you hear us, your will fear us,
We are the Southern Stars!

== Players ==
=== Former players ===
Commonly known players include Meg Lanning, Belinda Clark, Cathryn Fitzpatrick, and Ellyse Perry. Clark and Fitzpatrick are both in the ICC hall of fame, while Lanning and Clark captained Australia. Perry is a Double international, having represented Australia in both cricket and soccer. For a list of all players in ICC hall of fame, see ICC Cricket Hall of Fame

=== National captains ===
The current national captain of Australia is Sophie Molineux and the current vice captains of Australia are Tahlia McGrath and Ashleigh Gardner, but they have been many appointed captains for Australia over the years.

=== Current squad ===
A minimum of 18 players are offered a Cricket Australia women's contract each year. The program is conducted over a twelve-month period in which the athletes attend approximately three camps per year at the National Cricket Centre and undergo specialist training sessions within their home state.

Individual programs are developed for each squad member by the women's team head coach in consultation with the state coaches and the player. The player progress is monitored via testing, coach state visits, training diaries and communication with the athlete's coaches (state and satellite) by the head coach with assistance from the Australian team support staff and relevant state coach.

The table below lists the players awarded a national women's team contract with Cricket Australia on 8 April 2026, as well as any active player to make an appearance for the team within the last 12 months. Players not named on the initial list can be upgraded during the following twelve-month period by accruing twelve national team selection points to earn a contract—appearances at Test level are worth four points, while ODIs and T20Is are worth two each.

Key

- Forms – This refers to the forms they've played for Australia in the past year, not over their whole Australia career
- S/N – Shirt number
- C – Contracted to Cricket Australia (Y = Holds contract)

S/N	Name	Age	Batting style	Bowling style	WNCL team	WBBL team	Forms	C	Captain	Last Test	Last ODI	Last T20I
Batters
48	Grace Harris	33	Right-handed	Right-arm off break	Queensland	Brisbane Heat	ODI, T20I	Y		—N/a	(India) 2025	(India) 2026
18	Phoebe Litchfield	23	Left-handed	—N/a	New South Wales	Sydney Thunder	Test, ODI, T20I	Y		(India) 2026	(Cricket West Indies) 2026	(Cricket West Indies) 2026
13	Georgia Voll	23	Right-handed	Right-arm off break	Queensland	Sydney Thunder	Test, ODI, T20I	Y		(India) 2026	(Cricket West Indies) 2026	(Cricket West Indies) 2026
All-rounders
16	Nicola Carey	33	Left-handed	Right-arm medium	Tasmania	Hobart Hurricanes	ODI, T20I	Y		—N/a	(Cricket West Indies) 2026	(Cricket West Indies) 2026
63	Ashleigh Gardner	29	Right-handed	Right-arm off break	New South Wales	Sydney Sixers	Test, ODI, T20I	Y	Vice-captain	(India) 2026	(Cricket West Indies) 2026	(Cricket West Indies) 2026
11	Heather Graham	30	Right-handed	Right-arm medium	Tasmania	Hobart Hurricanes	—N/a	Y		—N/a	(Sri Lanka) 2019	(New Zealand) 2024
32	Tahlia McGrath	30	Right-handed	Right-arm medium	South Australia	Adelaide Strikers	Test, ODI, T20I	Y	Vice-captain	(India) 2026	(Cricket West Indies) 2026	(Cricket West Indies) 2026
23	Sophie Molineux	28	Left-handed	Left-arm orthodox spin	Victoria	Melbourne Renegades	ODI, T20I	Y	Captain	(South Africa) 2024	(Cricket West Indies) 2026	(Cricket West Indies) 2026
8	Ellyse Perry	36	Right-handed	Right-arm fast-medium	New South Wales	Sydney Sixers	Test, ODI, T20I	Y		(India) 2026	(Cricket West Indies) 2026	(Cricket West Indies) 2026
14	Annabel Sutherland	25	Right-handed	Right-arm medium-fast	Victoria	Melbourne Stars	Test, ODI, T20I	Y		(India) 2026	(India) 2026	(India) 2026
Wicket-keepers
6	Beth Mooney	32	Left-handed	—N/a	Western Australia	Perth Scorchers	Test, ODI, T20I	Y		(India) 2026	(Cricket West Indies) 2026	(Cricket West Indies) 2026
	Tahlia Wilson	27	Right-hamded	—N/a	New South Wales	Sydney Thunder	ODI			—N/a	(Cricket West Indies) 2026	—N/a
Spin Bowlers
27	Alana King	30	Right-handed	Right-arm leg break	Western Australia	Perth Scorchers	Test, ODI, T20I	Y		(India) 2026	(Cricket West Indies) 2026	(Cricket West Indies) 2026
35	Georgia Wareham	27	Right-handed	Right-arm leg break	Victoria	Melbourne Renegades	ODI, T20I	Y		(India) 2021	(Cricket West Indies) 2026	(Cricket West Indies) 2026
Pace Bowlers
	Chloe Ainsworth	20	Left-handed	Western Australia	Perth Scorchers	Brisbane Heat		Y		—N/a	—N/a	—N/a
28	Darcie Brown	23	Right-handed	Right-arm fast	South Australia	Adelaide Strikers	Test, ODI, T20I	Y		(India) 2026	(Cricket West Indies) 2026	(Cricket West Indies) 2026
34	Kim Garth	30	Right-handed	Right-arm medium-fast	Victoria	Melbourne Stars	ODI, T20I	Y		(England) 2025	(Cricket West Indies) 2026	(Cricket West Indies) 2026
55	Lucy Hamilton	20	Left-handed	Left-arm fast	Queensland	Brisbane Heat	Test, ODI	Y		(India) 2026	(Cricket West Indies) 2026	(Cricket West Indies) 2026
3	Megan Schutt	33	Right-handed	Right-arm fast-medium	South Australia	Adelaide Strikers	ODI, T20I	Y		(England) 2019	(Cricket West Indies) 2026	(Cricket West Indies) 2026
Last updated: 8 April 2026

== Coaching staff ==
The current coaching staff of the Australian women's cricket team includes:

- Shelley Nitschke – Head Coach
- Jude Coleman – Assistant Coach
- Dan Marsh – Assistant Coach
- Meg Lanning – Assistant Coach/Mentor
- Alex Kuntouris – Physio

== Selection panel ==
The members of the current National Selection Panel for the Australian women's cricket team are:

- Shawn Flegler – Chairman
- Shelley Nitschke – Head Coach
- Julie Hayes
- Avril Fahey

== Tournament history ==
Key
Champions
Runners-up
Semi-finals
Host

=== Cricket World Cup ===
Cricket World Cup record
Year	Finish	Rank	Mat	Won	Lost	Tied	NR
(England) 1973	Runners-up	2/7	6	4	1	0	1
(India) 1978	Champions	1/4	3	3	0	0	0
(New Zealand) 1982	Champions	1/5	13	12	0	1	0
(Australia) 1988	Champions	1/5	9	8	1	0	0
(England) 1993	Group stage	3/8	7	5	2	0	0
(India) 1997	Champions	1/11	7	7	0	0	0
(New Zealand) 2000	Runners-up	2/8	9	8	1	0	0
(South Africa) 2005	Champions	1/8	8	7	0	0	1
(Australia) 2009	Super sixes	4/8	7	4	3	0	0
(India) 2013	Champions	1/8	7	6	1	0	0
(England) 2017	Semi-finalists	3/8	8	6	2	0	0
(New Zealand) 2022	Champions	1/8	9	9	0	0	0
(India) 2025	Semi-finalists	3/8	7	6	1	0	0
Total	13 appearances, 7 titles		100	85	12	1	2

=== T20 World Cup ===
T20 World Cup record
Year	Finish	Rank	Mat	Won	Lost	Tied	NR
(England) 2009	Semi-finalists	3/8	4	2	2	0	0
(Cricket West Indies) 2010	Champions	1/8	5	5	0	0	0
(Sri Lanka) 2012	Champions	1/8	5	4	1	0	0
(Bangladesh) 2014	Champions	1/10	6	5	1	0	0
(India) 2016	Runners-up	2/10	6	4	2	0	0
(Cricket West Indies) 2018	Champions	1/10	6	5	1	0	0
(Australia) 2020	Champions	1/10	6	5	1	0	0
(South Africa) 2023	Champions	1/10	6	6	0	0	0
(United Arab Emirates) 2024	Semi-finalists	3/10	5	4	1	0	0
(England) 2026	Champions	1/12	7	7	0	0	0
Total	10 appearances, 7 titles		56	47	9	0	0

=== Commonwealth Games ===
Commonwealth Games record
Year	Round	Position	GP	W	L	T	NR
(England) 2022	Gold medal	1/8	5	5	0	0	0
Total	1 title	-	5	5	0	0	0

== Honours ==
=== ICC ===
- Women's World Cup:
  - Champions (7): 1978, 1982, 1988, 1997, 2005, 2013, 2022
  - Runners-up (2): 1973, 2000
- Women's T20 World Cup:
  - Champions (7): 2010, 2012, 2014, 2018, 2020, 2023, 2026
  - Runners-up (1): 2016

=== Other ===
- Commonwealth Games
  - Gold medal (1): 2022

== Records and statistics ==
=== Overall record ===
Result summary
Format	Mat	Won	Lost	Tied	NR	First match
Tests	80	23	11	0	46	28 December 1934
One Day Internationals	378	302	67	2	7	23 June 1973
Twenty20 Internationals	206	143 (Note: Includes one win via boundary countback and one win via bowl-out)	52 (Note: Includes two losses via Super Over)	4	5	2 September 2005
Last updated: 23 March 2025

=== Tests ===
- Highest team total: 9/575 dec. vs South Africa on 15 February 2024 at the WACA
- Highest individual score in an innings: 213* – Ellyse Perry vs England on 9 November 2017 at North Sydney Oval
- Best bowling figures in an innings: 8/66 – Ashleigh Gardner vs England on 22 June 2023 at Trent Bridge

Most career runs
Player	Runs	Ave	Career span
Ellyse Perry	1006	59.17	2008 - present
Karen Rolton	1002	55.66	1995–2009
Belinda Clark	919	45.95	1991–2005
Betty Wilson	862	57.46	1948–1958
Denise Annetts	819	81.90	1987–1992
Last updated: 15 August 2026

Most career wickets
Player	Wickets	Ave	Career span
Betty Wilson	68	11.80	1948–1958
Cathryn Fitzpatrick	60	19.11	1991–2006
Raelee Thompson	57	18.24	1972–1985
Debbie Wilson	48	18.33	1972–1985
Lyn Fullston	41	25.53	1984–1987
Last updated: 15 August 2026

Highest individual score in an innings
Player	Score	Opponent	Venue	Date
Ellyse Perry	213*	England	Sydney	9 November 2017
Annabel Sutherland	210	South Africa	Perth	15 February 2024
Karen Rolton	209*	England	Leeds	6 July 2001
Michelle Goszko	204	England	Shenley	24 June 2001
Joanne Broadbent	200	England	Guildford	6 August 1998
Last updated: 15 August 2026

Best bowling figures in an innings
Player	BBI	Opponent	Venue	Date
Ashleigh Gardner	8/66	England	Nottingham	22 June 2023
Betty Wilson	7/7	England	Melbourne	21 February 1958
Anne Palmer	7/18	England	Brisbane	28 December 1934
Lesley Johnston	7/24	New Zealand	Melbourne	5 February 1972
Betty Wilson	6/23	England	Adelaide	15 January 1949
Last updated: 15 August 2026

Results versus other nations
Opponent	Mat	Won	Lost	Tied	Draw	First match	First win
England	52	13	9	0	30	28 December 1934	15 June 1937
India	11	4	1	0	6	15 January 1977	15 January 1977
New Zealand	13	4	1	0	8	20 March 1948	20 March 1948
South Africa	1	1	0	0	0	15 February 2024	15 February 2024
West Indies	2	0	0	0	2	7 May 1976	
Last updated: 19 February 2024

=== One Day Internationals ===
- Highest team total: 3/412 vs Denmark on 16 December 1997 at Middle Income Group Club Ground
- Highest individual score in an innings: 229* – Belinda Clark vs Denmark on 16 December 1997 at Middle Income Group Club Ground
- Best bowling figures in an innings: 7/18 – Alana King vs South Africa on 25 October 2025 at Holkar Stadium, Indore

Most career runs
Player	Runs	Ave	Career span
Belinda Clark	4844	47.49	1991–2005
Karen Rolton	4814	48.14	1995–2009
Ellyse Perry	4626	48.69	2007–present
Meg Lanning	4602	53.51	2011–2023
Alyssa Healy	3777	37.02	2010–present
Last updated: 11 October 2026

Most career wickets
Player	Wickets	Ave	Career span
Cathryn Fitzpatrick	180	16.79	1993–2007
Ellyse Perry	166	25.56	2007–present
Megan Schutt	154	23.57	2013–present
Lisa Sthalekar	146	24.97	2001–2013
Jess Jonassen	141	19.60	2012–present
Last updated: 11 October 2026

Highest individual score in an innings
Player	Score	Opponent	Venue	Date
Belinda Clark	229*	Denmark	Mumbai	16 December 1997
Alyssa Healy	170	New Zealand	Hagley Oval	3 April 2022
Lisa Keightley	156*	Pakistan	Melbourne	7 February 1997
Karen Rolton	154*	Sri Lanka	Christchurch	1 December 2000
Meg Lanning	152*	Sri Lanka	Bristol	29 June 2017
Last updated: 30 December 2023

Best bowling figures in an innings
Player	BBI	Opponent	Venue	Date
Alana King	7/18	South Africa	Indore	25 October 2025
Ellyse Perry	7/22	England	Canterbury	7 July 2019
Shelley Nitschke	7/24	England	Kidderminster	19 August 2005
Charmaine Mason	5/9	England	Newcastle	3 February 2000
Joanne Broadbent	5/10	New Zealand	Lismore	13 January 1993
Last updated: 30 December 2023

Results versus other nations
Opponent	Mat	Won	Lost	Tied	NR	First match	First win
ICC Full members
Bangladesh	1	1	0	0	0	25 March 2022	25 March 2022
England	83	55	24	1	3	28 July 1973	1 August 1976
India	52	42	10	0	0	8 January 1978	8 January 1978
Ireland	17	17	0	0	0	28 June 1987	28 June 1987
New Zealand	133	100	31	0	2	7 July 1973	7 July 1973
Pakistan	16	16	0	0	0	14 December 1997	14 December 1997
South Africa	18	16	1	1	0	12 December 1997	12 December 1997
Sri Lanka	11	11	0	0	0	1 December 2000	1 December 2000
West Indies	18	16	1	0	1	24 July 1993	24 July 1993
ICC Associate members
Denmark	2	2	0	0	0	28 July 1993	28 July 1993
International XI	4	3	0	0	1	21 July 1973	20 June 1982
Jamaica	1	1	0	0	0	11 July 1973	11 July 1973
Netherlands	5	5	0	0	0	29 November 1988	29 November 1988
Trinidad and Tobago	1	1	0	0	0	30 June 1973	30 June 1973
Young England	1	1	0	0	0	23 June 1973	23 June 1973
Last updated: 30 December 2023

=== Twenty20 Internationals ===
- Highest team total:
  - 3/226 vs England, 26 July 2019 at Essex County Ground
  - 2/226 vs Sri Lanka, 2 October 2019 at North Sydney Oval
- Highest individual score in an innings: 148* – Alyssa Healy vs Sri Lanka, 2 October 2019 at North Sydney Oval
- Best bowling figures in an innings: 5/10 – Molly Strano vs New Zealand, 19 February 2017 at Kardinia Park

Most career runs
Player	Runs	Ave	Career span
Beth Mooney	3438	41.42	2010–present
Meg Lanning	3405	36.61	2010 - 2023
Alyssa Healy	3054	25.45	2010 - 2024
Ellyse Perry	2201	30.15	2008–present
Elyse Villani	1369	28.52	2009–2018
Last updated: Feb 2024

Most career wickets
Player	Wickets	Ave	Career span
Megan Schutt	152	17.78	2013–present
Ellyse Perry	127	18.89	2008–present
Jess Jonassen	96	19.62	2012–present
Ashleigh Gardner	64	21.81	2017–present
Lisa Sthalekar	60	19.35	2005–2013
Last updated: 30 December 2023

Highest individual score in an innings
Player	Score	Opponent	Venue	Date
Alyssa Healy	148*	Sri Lanka	Sydney	2 October 2019
Meg Lanning	133*	England	Chelmsford	26 July 2019
Meg Lanning	126	Ireland	Sylhet	27 March 2014
Beth Mooney	117*	England	Canberra	21 November 2017
Beth Mooney	113	Sri Lanka	Sydney	29 September 2019
Last updated: 30 December 2023

Best bowling figures in an innings
Player	BBI	Opponent	Venue	Date
Molly Strano	5/10	New Zealand	Geelong	19 February 2017
Jess Jonassen	5/12	India	Melbourne	12 February 2020
Ashleigh Gardner	5/12	New Zealand	Paarl	11 February 2023
Megan Schutt	5/15	Pakistan	Sydney	24 January 2023
Julie Hunter	5/22	West Indies	Colombo	5 October 2012
Last updated: 30 December 2023

Results versus other nations
Opponent	Mat	Won	Lost	Tied	NR	First match	First win
ICC Full members
Bangladesh	5	5	0	0	0	27 February 2020	27 February 2020
Barbados	1	1	0	0	0	31 July 2022	31 July 2022
England	45	23	21	0	1	2 September 2005	2 September 2005
India	35	26	8	0	1	28 October 2008	28 October 2008
Ireland	8	8	0	0	0	27 March 2014	27 March 2014
New Zealand	55	33	21	0	1	18 October 2006	19 July 2007
Pakistan	16	14	0	0	2	29 September 2012	29 September 2012
South Africa	11	9	2	0	0	7 May 2010	7 May 2010
Sri Lanka	8	8	0	0	0	27 September 2016	27 September 2016
West Indies	19	17	2	0	0	14 June 2009	14 June 2009
Last updated: 23 March 2026

== See also ==
- Australia men's national cricket team
- Australian Cricket Hall of Fame
- Australian Women's Twenty20 Cup
- Belinda Clark Award
- Women's Big Bash League
- Women's cricket in Australia
- Women's National Cricket League

== Bibliography ==
- Bollen, Fiona (2020). Clearing Boundaries: The Rise of Australian Women's Cricket. Subiaco, WA: Churchill Press. ISBN 9780958598644.
- Butcher, Betty (1996). Ice-cream with Chilli Powder: A Manager's Account of a Women's Cricket Tour of India in the 1970s. Essendon, Vic.: B. Butcher. ISBN 978-0646275314.
- Cashman, Richard; Weaver, Amanda (1991). Wicket Women: Cricket & Women in Australia. Kensington, NSW: New South Wales University Press. ISBN 978-0868403649.
- Harvey, Rob (2018). Captains File: From Peden to Haynes: Australia's Women Test Cricket Captains. Neutral Bay, NSW: Independently published. ISBN 9781985183520.
- Hawes, Joan L. (1987). Women's Test Cricket: The Golden Triangle 1934-84. Lewes, East Sussex: The Book Guild. ISBN 978-0863322747.
- Joy, Nancy (1950). Maiden Over: A Short History of Women's Cricket and A Diary of the 1948-49 Test Tour of Australia. London: Sporting Handbooks. OCLC 560082308.
- Morgan, Grace A. (2009). Morgan, John C. (ed.). Women's Cricket Touring in 1934/5 and 1948/9: An Autobiography. Holt, Wiltshire: GAM Book Publishing. ISBN 9780956193803.
- Pollard, Marjorie (1937). Australian Women's Cricket Team in England, 1937: A Diary. Letchworth: Pollard Publications. OCLC 223800454.
