= West Indies women's cricket team in England in 1979 =

	England	West Indies
- Dates: 2 June – 8 July 1979
Captains	Susan Goatman	Patricia Whittaker

Test series
- Result: England won the 3-match series 2–0
Most runs	Enid Bakewell (309)	Patricia Whittaker (165)
Most wickets	Julia Greenwood (23)	Patricia Whittaker (9)

One Day International series
- Results: 3-match series drawn 1–1
Most runs	Enid Bakewell (92)	Louise Browne (82)
Most wickets	Julia Greenwood (4)	Patricia Whittaker (3); Dorothy Hobson (3)

The West Indies women's cricket team toured England in June and July 1979. They played England in three Test matches and three One Day Internationals, with the Test series ending as a 2–0 victory for England and the ODI series finishing as a 1–1 draw, with one match abandoned.

== Squads ==
England	West Indies
Susan Goatman (c); Enid Bakewell; Jan Brittin; Katherine Brown; Jacqueline Court; Julia Greenwood; Rachael Heyhoe Flint; Shirley Hodges (wk); Glynis Hullah; Catherine Mowat; Margaret Peear; Jill Powell; Jan Southgate; Janet Tedstone; Lynne Thomas; Jacqueline Wainwright; Chris Watmough	Patricia Whittaker (c); Patricia Alfred; Sheryl Bayley; Shirley-Ann Bonaparte; Beverly Browne; Louise Browne; Merlyn Edwards; Peggy Fairweather; Yolande Geddes-Hall (wk); Gloria Gill; Dorothy Hobson; Vivalyn Latty-Scott; Jasmine Sammy; Grace Williams

== Tour Matches ==
=== 1-day single innings matches ===
2 June 1979
Scorecard

Southern Counties; 141/9d (54 overs)	v	West Indies; 130 (47.2 overs)
Chris Watmough 57 (–); Sheryl Bayley 3/27 (11 overs)		Grace Williams 59 (–); Glynis Hullah 3/8 (6.2 overs)

Southern Counties Women won by 11 runs
Greater London Council Ground, Sutton
Umpires: Esme Irwin (Eng) and Veronica Reichwald (Eng)

- West Indies Women won the toss and elected to field.

2 June 1979
Scorecard

West Indies; 141 (54.1 overs)	v	Young England; 114 (51.1 overs)
Merlyn Edwards 46 (–); Helen Stother 4/35 (10.1 overs)		Jan Brittin 35 (–); Sheryl Bayley 5/27 (12 overs)

West Indies Women won by 27 runs
The Oval, Kennington, London
Umpires: June Bragger (Eng) and Anne Garton (Eng)

- Young England Women won the toss and elected to field.

9 June 1979
Scorecard

South of England; 181 (58 overs)	v	West Indies; 111/6 (41 overs)
Jan Brittin 62 (–); Peggy Fairweather 2/45 (17 overs)		Gloria Gill 26 (–); Jacqueline Court 2/23 (6 overs)

Match drawn
Civil Service Sports Ground, Chiswick, London
Umpires: Sheila Hill (Eng) and Esme Irwin (Eng)

- South of England Women won the toss and elected to bat.

10 June 1979
Scorecard

West Indies; 162/8d (69 overs)	v	East of England; 108/3 (32 overs)
Shirley-Ann Bonaparte 67 (–); Mary Pilling 3/30 (11 overs)		Susan Goatman 35 (–); Dorothy Hobson 1/23 (8 overs)

Match drawn
Goddington Dene, Orpington, London
Umpires: May Howard (Eng) and Pip Vyvyan (Eng)

- East of England Women won the toss and elected to field.

20 June 1979
Scorecard

Northern Counties; 144 (52.4 overs)	v	West Indies; 145/6 (44 overs)
Enid Bakewell 47* (–); Patricia Whittaker 3/13 (8.4 overs)		Shirley-Ann Bonaparte 49* (–); Carole Hodges 3/21 (8 overs)

West Indies Women won by 4 wickets
Tickhill Sports Ground, Tickhill
Umpires: Peggy Culver (Eng) and May Howard (Eng)

- West Indies Women won the toss and elected to field.

27 June 1979
Scorecard

West of England; 167/9d (63.4 overs)	v	West Indies; 152/6 (44 overs)
Lynne Thomas 61 (–); Patricia Whittaker 3/27 (15 overs)		Patricia Whittaker 50* (–); Mary Weaver 4/52 (15 overs)

Match drawn
Backwell Flax Bourton Cricket Club Ground, Flax Bourton
Umpires: Jane Ayres (Eng) and Peggy Culver (Eng)

- West of England Women won the toss and elected to bat.

5 July 1979
Scorecard

West Indies; 207/6d (65 overs)	v	Women's Cricket Association President's XI; 89/4 (33 overs)
Patricia Whittaker 40* (–); Mary Pilling 2/39 (14 overs)		June Stephenson 38 (–); Dorothy Hobson 3/31 (9 overs)

Match drawn
Danescourt, Wolverhampton
Umpires: Jane Ayres (Eng) and Pip Vyvyan (Eng)

- West Indies Women won the toss and elected to bat.

8 July 1979
Scorecard

West Indies; 108 (46.3 overs)	v	North of England; 109/8 (41 overs)
Vivalyn Latty-Scott 38 (–); Julia Greenwood 5/33 (13 overs)		Sandra Lister 29* (–); Peggy Fairweather 4/39 (17 overs)

North of England Women won by 2 wickets
Steetley Company Ground, Shireoaks
Umpires: June Bragger (Eng) and Sheila Hill (Eng)

- North of England Women won the toss and elected to field.

== WODI Series ==
=== 1st ODI ===
6 June 1979
Scorecard

West Indies; 159/7 (54 overs)	v	England; 161/2 (50.3 overs)
Beverly Browne 47 (–); Enid Bakewell 3/22 (11 overs)		Rachael Heyhoe Flint 53* (–); Dorothy Hobson 2/35 (9 overs)

England Women won by 8 wickets
Lensbury Sports Ground, Teddington, London
Umpires: Peggy Culver (Eng) and Veronica Reichwald (Eng)

- England Women won the toss and elected to field.
- Match reduced to 54 overs per side.
- Jan Brittin, Margaret Peear, Jacqueline Wainwright (Eng), Sheryl Bayley, Shirley-Ann Bonaparte and Gloria Gill (WI) all made their WODI debuts.

=== 2nd ODI ===
13 June 1979
Scorecard

England	v	West Indies

Match Abandoned
Mote Park, Maidstone
Umpires: June Bragger (Eng) and Sheila Hill (Eng)

- No toss.
- No play possible due to rain.

=== 3rd ODI ===
7 July 1979
Scorecard

England; 167/6 (50 overs)	v	West Indies; 169/8 (49.4 overs)
Enid Bakewell 57 (–); Patricia Whittaker 3/36 (10 overs)		Louise Browne 45 (–); Julia Greenwood 3/36 (10 overs)

West Indies Women won by 2 wickets
Steetley Company Ground, Shireoaks
Umpires: June Bragger (Eng) and Sheila Hill (Eng)

- England Women won the toss and elected to bat.
- Match reduced to 50 overs per side.
- Jill Powell, Janet Tedstone, (Eng) Patricia Alfred and Patricia Whittaker (WI) all made their WODI debuts.

== Test Series ==
=== 1st Test ===
16 – 18 June 1979
Scorecard

West Indies	v	England
185 (81.1 overs); Grace Williams 44 (–); Julia Greenwood 6/46 (21 overs)		184/7d (59.5 overs); Jacqueline Court 44 (–); Peggy Fairweather 3/58 (24 overs)
67 (37.5 overs); Patricia Whittaker 28 (–); Julia Greenwood 5/17 (15 overs)		71/1 (26.2 overs); Enid Bakewell 38* (–); Patricia Whittaker 1/26 (7 overs)

England Women won by 9 wickets
St Lawrence Ground, Canterbury
Umpires: May Howard (Eng) and Peggy Culver (Eng)

- England Women won the toss and elected to field.
- Jan Brittin, Susan Goatman, Catherine Mowat, Jacqueline Wainwright, (Eng) Patricia Alfred and Shirley-Ann Bonaparte (WI) all made their WTest debuts.

=== 2nd Test ===
23 – 25 June 1979
Scorecard

West Indies	v	England
207 (79 overs); Patricia Whittaker 51 (–); Julia Greenwood 5/43 (18 overs)		208/6d (67.2 overs); Rachael Heyhoe Flint 62 (–); Patricia Whittaker 4/38 (16.2 overs)
151/8d (54 overs); Shirley-Ann Bonaparte 61 (–); Julia Greenwood 4/36 (15 overs)		107/4 (17 overs); Chris Watmough 40 (–); Peggy Fairweather 1/14 (2 overs)

Match drawn
Trent Bridge, Nottingham
Umpires: Esme Irwin (Eng) and Sheila Hill (Eng)

- West Indies Women won the toss and elected to bat.
- Merlyn Edwards (WI) made her WTest debut.

=== 3rd Test ===
1 – 3 July 1979
Scorecard

England	v	West Indies
214/4d (63 overs); Susan Goatman 71 (–); Patricia Whittaker 2/45 (14 overs)		188 (58.2 overs); Beverly Browne 72 (–); Enid Bakewell 3/14 (10.2 overs)
164 (83 overs); Enid Bakewell 112* (–); Jasmine Sammy 3/22 (19 overs)		166 (68.4 overs); Patricia Whittaker 65 (–); Enid Bakewell 7/61 (28.4 overs)

England Women won by 24 runs
Edgbaston Cricket Ground, Birmingham
Umpires: Jane Ayres (Eng) and June Bragger (Eng)

- West Indies Women won the toss and elected to field.
- Jill Powell and Katherine Brown (Eng) both made their WTest debuts.
