= Joseph (surname) =

Joseph is an English and French surname. Notable people with the surname include:

- Aaron Joseph (born 1989), Australian footballer
- Agnes Joseph (born 1970), Dutch politician
- Alexis Joseph (born 2009), Canadian ice hockey player
- Alison Joseph, English crime writer
- Alzarri Joseph (born 1996), Antiguan cricketer
- Amber Joseph (born 1999), Barbadian cyclist
- Betty Joseph (1917–2013), British psychoanalyst
- Bo Joseph, American contemporary artist
- Bradley Joseph (born 1965), American composer, pianist, recording artist
- Brandon Joseph (born 2001), American football player
- Carlos Joseph (1980–2021), American football player
- Collinda Joseph (born 1965), Canadian wheelchair curler
- Cory Joseph (born 1991), Canadian basketball player
- Charles Joseph (disambiguation), several people
- Chris Joseph (disambiguation), several people
- Christian Joseph, American social media personality known online as "the Rizzler"
- Claudette Joseph, Grenadian politician
- Curtis Joseph (born 1967), Canadian ice hockey player
- Daniel D. Joseph (1929–2011), American mechanical engineer
- Dave Joseph (born 1969), Antiguan cricketer
- Derek Joseph, Pakistani general
- Deborah Joseph, American computer scientist
- Edwin Joseph (born 2005), American football player
- E. F. Joseph (1900–1979) Saint Lucian-born American photographer, and photojournalist
- Elinor Joseph (born 1991), Israeli soldier
- Ezechiel Joseph, Saint Lucian politician
- Francis Joseph (disambiguation), several people
- Garth Joseph (born 1973), Dominican basketball player
- George Joseph (disambiguation), several people
- Geri M. Joseph (1923–2023), American politician
- Glen Joseph (born 1984), English actor
- Gloria Joseph (1927–2019), Crucian-American writer and activist
- Greg Joseph (born 1994), American football player
- Guy Joseph (born 1957), Saint Lucian politician
- Irving J. Joseph (c.1881–1943), New York politician
- Jacqueline Nesti Joseph, (born 1932), Haitian artist
- Jane Joseph (1894–1929), English composer
- Jane Joseph (cricketer), Trinidadian cricketer
- Janine Joseph, a Filipino-American poet and author
- Jennie Joseph, midwife and educator
- Jenny Joseph (1932–2018), British poet
- John Joseph (disambiguation), several people
- Kathie-Ann Joseph, American surgeon at Columbia University
- Kareem Joseph (footballer born 1983), footballer from Trinidad and Tobago
- Karl Joseph (born 1993), American football player
- Keith Joseph (1918–1994), British politician and architect of Thatcherism
- Kelvin Joseph (born 1999), American football player
- Kerby Joseph (born 2000), American football player
- Kris Joseph (born 1988), Canadian basketball player
- Lawrence Albert Joseph, Grenadian attorney and politician
- Lazarus Joseph (1891–1966), American NY State Senator and New York City Comptroller
- Lenny Joseph (born 2000), Haitian footballer born in France
- Lesley Joseph (born 1946), British actress
- Linval Joseph (born 1988), American football player
- MaChelle Joseph (born 1970), American women's basketball coach
- Marc Joseph (born 1976), English footballer
- Marcus Joseph (born 1991), Trinidadian footballer
- Marie Joseph Demers (1871–1940), Canadian politician
- Mario Joseph (1962 or 1963–2025), Haitian human rights lawyer
- Mathai Joseph, Indian computer scientist
- Mathieu Joseph (born 1997), Canadian ice hockey player
- Miles Joseph (born 1974), American soccer player
- Nafisa Joseph (1978–2004), Indian model and MTV video jockey
- Natilien Joseph, Canadian politician
- Peterson Joseph (born 1990), Haitian footballer
- Philippe Lincourt-Joseph (born 1994), Canadian soccer player
- Pierre-Olivier Joseph (born 1999), Canadian ice hockey player
- Qiana Joseph (born 2001), Saint Lucia and West Indies cricketer
- River Joseph (born 1999), Filipino actor and entrepreneur
- Ronald Joseph (disambiguation), several people
- Roy Joseph (1909–1979), Trinidad and Tobago politician
- Sebastian Joseph-Day (born 1995), American football player
- Shahadi Wright Joseph (born 2005), American actress, singer and dancer
- Shalrie Joseph (born 1978), Grenadian footballer
- Shamar Joseph (born 1999), Guyanese and West Indies cricketer
- Sheyaa Bin Abraham-Joseph (born 1992), American and British rapper, known as 21 Savage
- Solomon Clifford Joseph (1893–1966), British naval aviator
- Surelee Joseph (born 1986), Indian television actress and model
- Sylvester Joseph (born 1978), Antiguan cricketer
- Tam Joseph (born 1947), British painter originally from Dominica
- Tyler Joseph (born 1988), American musician and lead singer of Twenty One Pilots
- Vivian Joseph (born 1948), American figure skater
- Vosean Joseph (born 1997), American football player
- Waldren Joseph (1918–2004), American jazz trombone player
- Will Joseph (rugby union, born 1877), (1877–1959) Welsh rugby union player
- William Joseph (disambiguation), several people
- Yvon Joseph (born 1957), Haitian basketball player

== See also ==
- Joseph (disambiguation)
- Joseph (given name), information about the name itself
- József (surname)
