= Janice Moses =

Personal information
- Full name: Janice Moses
- Role: Bowler

International information
- National side: Trinidad and Tobago
- ODI debut (cap 6): 23 June 1973 v New Zealand
- Last ODI: 20 July 1973 v England

Career statistics
Competition	WODI
Matches	3
Runs scored	2
Batting average	0.66
100s/50s	0/0
Top score	2
Balls bowled	96
Wickets	1
Bowling average	55.00
5 wickets in innings	0
10 wickets in match	0
Best bowling	1/20
Catches/stumpings	0/–
- Source: ESPNcricinfo, 21 October 2017

Janice Moses is a Trinidadian former cricketer who represented the Trinidad and Tobago women's national cricket team.

A bowler, Moses played in three women's One Day Internationals at the inaugural Women's Cricket World Cup in 1973 in England. Playing in matches against New Zealand, Jamaica and England, she finished the tournament with just one wicket – that of Jamaican opening batsman Elaine Emmanual, out leg before wicket for seven runs.

In 1985, some twelve years after the World Cup, Moses played in two matches against a touring Irish side with both games played at Queen's Park Oval in Port of Spain.
