= Yvonne Oldfield =

Jamaican cricketer

Personal information
- Born: unknown

International information
- National side: Jamaica
- ODI debut (cap 9): 30 June 1973 v Young England
- Last ODI: 14 July 1973 v International XI

Career statistics
Competition	WODI
Matches	4
Runs scored	7
Batting average	2.33
100s/50s	0/0
Top score	7
Balls bowled	6
Wickets	0
Bowling average	–
5 wickets in innings	–
10 wickets in match	–
Best bowling	–
Catches/stumpings	0/–
- Source: Cricinfo, 23 February 2018

Yvonne Oldfield is a Jamaican former cricketer. She made her Women's One Day International debut during the 1973 Women's Cricket World Cup against Young England in a group stage match where fellow Jamaican players Grace Williams, Madge Stewart, Elaine Emmanual, Loretta McIntosh, Evelyn Bogle and Dorrett Davis also made their maiden international appearance in the inaugural Women's Cricket World Cup.
