= Loretta McIntosh =

Jamaican cricketer

International information
- National side: Jamaica
- ODI debut (cap 8): 30 June 1973 v Young England
- Last ODI: 14 July 1973 v International XI

Career statistics
Competition	WODI
Matches	5
Runs scored	39
Batting average	7.80
100s/50s	0/0
Top score	20
Catches/stumpings	0/–
- Source: Cricinfo, 23 February 2018

Loretta McIntosh is a Jamaican former cricketer. She made her Women's One Day International debut during the 1973 Women's Cricket World Cup against Young England in a group stage match where fellow Jamaican players Leila Williams, Madge Stewart, Elaine Emmanual, Dorrett Davis, Evelyn Bogle and Yvonne Oldfield also made their maiden international appearance in the inaugural Women's Cricket World Cup.
