= Evelyn Bogle =

Jamaican cricketer

International information
- National side: Jamaica
- ODI debut (cap 1): 30 June 1973 v Young England
- Last ODI: 14 July 1973 v International XI

Career statistics
| Competition | WODI |
|---|---|
| Matches | 5 |
| Runs scored | 77 |
| Batting average | 15.40 |
| 100s/50s | 0/0 |
| Top score | 45 |
| Balls bowled | 222 |
| Wickets | 4 |
| Bowling average | 33.00 |
| 5 wickets in innings | 0 |
| 10 wickets in match | 0 |
| Best bowling | 2/44 |
| Catches/stumpings | 1/– |
- Source: Cricinfo, 23 February 2018

Evelyn Bogle is a Jamaican former cricketer. She made her Women's One Day International debut for Jamaica during the 1973 Women's Cricket World Cup against Young England in a group stage match where fellow Jamaican players Leila Williams, Madge Stewart, Dorrett Davis, Loretta McIntosh, Elaine Emmanual and Yvonne Oldfield also made their maiden international appearance in the inaugural Women's Cricket World Cup.
