= Dorrett Davis =

Jamaican cricketer

International information
- National side: Jamaica
- ODI debut (cap 2): 30 June 1973 v Young England
- Last ODI: 14 July 1973 v International XI

Career statistics
Competition	WODI
Matches	3
Runs scored	14
Batting average	4.66
100s/50s	0/0
Top score	13
Balls bowled	12
Wickets	0
Bowling average	–
5 wickets in innings	–
10 wickets in match	–
Best bowling	–
Catches/stumpings	1/–
- Source: Cricinfo, 23 February 2018

Dorrett Davis is a Jamaican former cricketer. She made her Women's One Day International debut for Jamaica during the 1973 Women's Cricket World Cup against Young England in a group stage match where fellow Jamaican players Leila Williams, Madge Stewart, Elaine Emmanual, Loretta McIntosh, Evelyn Bogle and Yvonne Oldfield also made their maiden international appearance in the inaugural Women's Cricket World Cup.
