= Pollock-Krasner Foundation =

American artist grant program and foundation

- Abbreviation: PKF
- Formation: 1985; 41 years ago
- Headquarters: New York City, New York, United States
- President: Samuel Sachs II
- Chairman: George Spencer
- Executive Director: Caroline Black
- Website: www.pkf.org

The Pollock-Krasner Foundation was established in 1985 for the purpose of providing funding to visual artists internationally to further their artistic practices. It was established at the bequest of Lee Krasner, who was an American abstract expressionist painter and the spouse of fellow painter Jackson Pollock. To date, the foundation has awarded more than 5,000 grants in 79 countries for a total of over $87 million.

== Activities ==
The foundation provides grants to painters, sculptors, printmakers, and artists who work on paper. Since 1991, the foundation has given out the Lee Krasner Award, in recognition of a lifetime of artistic achievement, and the Pollock Prize for Creativity, given annually to an artist whose work "embodies high creative standards and has a substantial impact on society." These awards are based on the same criteria as grants and are by nomination only. Previous recipients of Pollock-Krasner Foundation grants and awards include Shimon Attie, John Beech (artist), Mel Chin, Rita McBride, Amy Sherald, Shahzia Sikander, Carrie Mae Weems, Richard Whitten, and others.

== See also ==
- Pollock-Krasner House and Studio
