= 2016 Regional Women's Twenty20 Championship =

- Dates: 21 July – 25 July 2018
- Administrator(s): Cricket West Indies
- Cricket format: Twenty20
- Tournament format(s): Round robin and final
- Champions: Trinidad and Tobago (1st title)
- Participants: 6
- Matches: 12
- Most runs: Shemaine Campbelle (182)
- Most wickets: Anisa Mohammed (9); Erva Giddings (9); Shanel Daley (9)

The 2016 Regional Women's Twenty20 Championship was the third season of the women's Twenty20 cricket competition played in the West Indies. It took place in July 2016, with 6 teams taking part and all matches taking place at Providence Stadium in Guyana. Trinidad and Tobago won the tournament, beating Jamaica in the final to claim their first T20 title.

The tournament followed the 2016 Regional Women's Championship.

== Competition format ==
The six teams were divided into two groups of three, and played three matches in the group stage: against the two other teams in their group and one 'cross-zone' match against a team from the other group. Matches were played using a Twenty20 format. Following the group stage, the top two teams went into the final to determine the Champions, whilst the second-placed teams played a 3rd-place play-off and the third-placed teams played a 5th-place play-off.

The group worked on a points system with positions being based on the total points. Points were awarded as follows:

Win: 3 points
Loss: 0 points.
Abandoned/No Result: 2 points.

== Points table ==
=== Zone A ===
Pos	Team	Pld	W	L	Pts	NRR	Qualification
1	Trinidad and Tobago	3	2	1	6	1.854	Advanced to the final
2	Barbados	3	2	1	6	1.300	Advanced to the 3rd-place play-off
3	Guyana	3	0	3	0	−1.112	Advanced to the 5th-place play-off

Source: Windies Cricket

=== Zone B ===
Pos	Team	Pld	W	L	NR	Pts	NRR	Qualification
1	Jamaica	3	3	0	0	9	2.834	Advanced to the final
2	Windward Islands	3	0	2	1	1	−3.225	Advanced to the 3rd-place play-off
3	Leeward Islands	3	0	2	1	1	−4.334	Advanced to the 5th-place play-off

Source: Windies Cricket

== Play-offs ==
=== 5th-place play-off ===
25 July 2016
Scorecard

Guyana; 157/1 (20 overs)	v	Leeward Islands; 62 (17.4 overs)
Shemaine Campbelle 70* (53); Shawnisha Hector 1/28 (4 overs)		Amanda Edwards 10 (9); Plaffiana Millington 3/8 (4 overs)

Guyana won by 95 runs
Providence Stadium, Providence, Guyana
Umpires: Athol Hamilton and Troy Tudor
Player of the match: Shemaine Campbelle

- Leeward Islands won the toss and elected to field.

=== 3rd-place play-off ===
25 July 2016
Scorecard

Windward Islands; 98/3 (20 overs)	v	Barbados; 99/1 (10.5 overs)
Akeira Peters 39* (41); Shakera Selman 2/14 (4 overs)		Kycia Knight 46* (36); Rackel Williams 1/19 (2 overs)

Barbados won by 9 wickets
Providence Stadium, Providence, Guyana
Umpires: Ryan Banwarie and Jacqueline Williams
Player of the match: Kycia Knight

- Windward Islands won the toss and elected to bat.

=== Final ===
25 July 2016
Scorecard

Jamaica; 100/7 (20 overs)	v	Trinidad and Tobago; 101/8 (19.4 overs)
Tameka Sanford 33 (25); Anisa Mohammed 2/15 (4 overs)		Merissa Aguilleira 26 (28); Shanel Daley 2/13 (4 overs)

Trinidad and Tobago won by 2 wickets
Providence Stadium, Providence, Guyana
Umpires: Imran Moakan and Nandkumar Shivsankar
Player of the match: Anisa Mohammed

- Jamaica won the toss and elected to bat.

== Statistics ==
=== Most runs ===
Player	Team	Matches	Innings	Runs	Average	HS	100s	50s
Shemaine Campbelle	Guyana	4	4	182	182.00	70*	0	2
Stafanie Taylor	Jamaica	4	4	172	86.00	68*	0	2
Kycia Knight	Barbados	4	4	120	40.00	46*	0	0
Shaquana Quintyne	Barbados	4	3	103	51.50	56*	0	1
Merissa Aguilleira	Trinidad and Tobago	4	4	82	27.33	50*	0	1

Source: Windies Cricket

=== Most wickets ===
Player	Team	Overs	Wickets	Average	BBI	5w
Anisa Mohammed	Trinidad and Tobago	16.0	9	6.11	4/9	0
Erva Giddings	Guyana	14.0	9	9.22	4/15	0
Shanel Daley	Jamaica	16.0	9	6.11	5/11	1
Plaffiana Millington	Guyana	14.0	6	7.83	3/8	0
Shenelle Lord	Trinidad and Tobago	15.0	6	9.83	2/5	0

Source: Windies Cricket
