= Christine Jacobson =

Trinidadian cricket player

International information
- National side: Trinidad and Tobago
- ODI debut (cap 4): 23 June 1973 v New Zealand
- Last ODI: 20 July 1973 v England

Career statistics
| Competition | WODI |
|---|---|
| Matches | 6 |
| Runs scored | 42 |
| Batting average | 8.40 |
| 100s/50s | 0/0 |
| Top score | 16 |
| Balls bowled | 426 |
| Wickets | 8 |
| Bowling average | 18.00 |
| 5 wickets in innings | 0 |
| 10 wickets in match | 0 |
| Best bowling | 3/15 |
| Catches/stumpings | 0/– |
- Source: Cricinfo, 5 February 2018

Christine Jacobson is a Trinidadian former cricketer who played for Trinidad and Tobago in WODIs.

== Career ==
She was part of the Trinidad and Tobago women's national cricket team in the 1973 Women's Cricket World Cup and made her Women's One Day International debut at the inaugural edition of the Women's Cricket World Cup in a group stage clash against New Zealand. She played all 6 matches for Trinidad and Tobago in the World Cup as her side was knocked out of the first round in the tournament. She finished the tournament as the joint leading wicket taker for Trinidad and Tobago along with Nora St. Rose with 8 wickets.
