= Emelda Noreiga =

Personal information
- Full name: Emelda Noreiga
- Born: 1947 (age 78–79); Trinidad
- Role: Wicket-keeper

International information
- National side: Trinidad and Tobago
- ODI debut (cap 7): 23 June 1973 v New Zealand
- Last ODI: 14 July 1973 v Young England

Domestic team information
- Years: Team
- 1971: South Trinidad Women

Career statistics
Competition	WODI
Matches	4
Runs scored	14
Batting average	3.5
100s/50s	0/0
Top score	8
Catches/stumpings	3/0
- Source: ESPNcricinfo, 19 October 2017

Emelda Noreiga (born 1947) is a former Trinidadian cricketer who represented the Trinidad and Tobago women's national cricket team.

A wicket-keeper and middle order batsman, Noreiga played in four women's One Day Internationals at the inaugural Women's Cricket World Cup in 1973 in England. Playing in matches against New Zealand, Australia, Jamaica and Young England, she was replaced as wicket-keeper by Merlyn Edwards in Trinidad and Tobago's final two matches of tournament against the International XI and England.

Prior to the World Cup in February 1971, Noreiga played in both Hayward Shield matches for Trinidad – a tri-series against England and Jamaica with Trinidad winning both the two-day games and the tournament. She also played in a 1-day single innings match for South Trinidad against the same touring English women side. She made nine runs with the bat and stumped Lesley Clifford.

Noreiga played in three further matches for Trinidad and Tobago during the Caribbean Women's Cricket Federation Championships in October 1975 against Barbados, Jamaica and Grenada.
