= Leila Williams (disambiguation) =

Leila Williams (born 1937) is a British former TV presenter.

Leila Williams may also refer to:

- Leila Grace Williams (born 1947), Jamaican former cricketer
- Leila Williams, a character in the novel series Fifty Shades
