= Elaine Emmanual =

Jamaican cricketer

International information
- National side: Jamaica
- ODI debut (cap 3): 30 June 1973 v Young England
- Last ODI: 14 July 1973 v International XI

Career statistics
Competition	WODI
Matches	5
Runs scored	33
Batting average	8.25
100s/50s	0/0
Top score	13*
Balls bowled	12
Wickets	0
Bowling average	–
5 wickets in innings	–
10 wickets in match	–
Best bowling	–
Catches/stumpings	0/–
- Source: Cricinfo, 23 February 2018

Elaine Emmanual is a Jamaican former cricketer. She made her Women's One Day International debut during the 1973 Women's Cricket World Cup against Young England in a group-stage match where fellow Jamaica players Leila Williams, Madge Stewart, Dorrett Davis, Loretta McIntosh, Evelyn Bogle and Yvonne Oldfield also made their maiden international appearance in the inaugural Women's Cricket World Cup.
