= Noreiga =

Noreiga is a surname. Notable people with the surname include:

- Anthony Noreiga (born 1982), Trinidadian footballer
- Emelda Noreiga (born 1947), Trinidadian cricketer
- Jack Noreiga (1936–2003), West Indian cricketer

== See also ==
- Noriega
