= Audrey McInnis =

Jamaican cricketer

Personal information
- Born: unknown
- Batting: Left-handed

International information
- National side: Jamaica (1973 – 1973)
- ODI debut (cap 12): 4 July 1973 v Trinidad and Tobago
- Last ODI: 14 July 1973 v International XI

Career statistics
Competition	WODI
Matches	3
Runs scored	4
Batting average	1.33
100s/50s	0/0
Top score	3
Balls bowled	-
Wickets	-
Bowling average	-
5 wickets in innings	-
10 wickets in match	-
Best bowling	-
Catches/stumpings	0/0
- Source: Cricinfo, 19 February 2018

Audrey McInnis is a former Jamaican cricketer who played for Jamaica in three Women's ODIs as a part of the inaugural Women's Cricket World Cup in 1973. She made her Women's One Day International debut against Trinidad and Tobago in a group stage match during the 1973 Women's Cricket World Cup.
