= Anne McEwen =

Ann or Anne McEwen may refer to:

- Dame Annie McEwen (1900–1967), wife of Australian Prime Minister John McEwen
- Anne McEwen (politician) (born 1954), Australian Labor Party politician
- Ann McEwen, West Indian cricketer
