= Joyce Demmin =

Trinidadian cricketer

Cricket information
- Batting: Right-handed
- Role: All-rounder

International information
- National side: Trinidad and Tobago
- ODI debut (cap 3): 23 June 1973 v New Zealand
- Last ODI: 20 July 1973 v England

Domestic team information
- Years: Team
- 1973: Trinidad and Tobago
- Source: Cricinfo, 16 May 2016

Joyce Demmin is a Trinidad and Tobago women's cricketer who played for the Trinidad and Tobago women's cricket team in the 1970s.
