= Menota Tekah =

West Indies cricketer

Personal information
- Full name: Menota Tekah
- Born: Trinidad
- Batting: Right-handed
- Bowling: Right-arm off break
- Role: Batter

International information
- National sides: Trinidad and Tobago (1973); West Indies (1976)
- Test debut (cap 9): 7 May 1976; West Indies v Australia
- Last Test: 27 November 1976; West Indies v India
- ODI debut (cap 11): 23 June 1973; Trinidad and Tobago v New Zealand
- Last ODI: 20 July 1973; Trinidad and Tobago v England

Domestic team information
- Years: Team
- 1973–1975/76: Trinidad and Tobago

Career statistics
Competition	WTest	WODI	WFC
Matches	5	6	6
Runs scored	57	28	70
Batting average	8.14	4.66	8.75
100s/50s	0/0	0/0	0/0
Top score	22	12	22
Balls bowled	6	20	6
Wickets	0	0	0
Bowling average	–	–	–
5 wickets in innings	0	0	0
10 wickets in match	0	0	0
Best bowling	–	–	–
Catches/stumpings	0/–	0/–	0/–
- Source: CricketArchive, 18 December 2021

Menota Tekah is a Trinidadian former cricketer who played as a right-handed batter. She appeared in six One Day Internationals for Trinidad and Tobago at the 1973 World Cup and five Test matches for the West Indies in 1976. In all, she scored 57 Test runs and 28 ODI runs. She also played domestic cricket for Trinidad and Tobago.
