= Jane Joseph (cricketer) =

Trinidadian cricketer

Personal information
- Full name: Jane Joseph
- Role: All-rounder

International information
- National side: Trinidad and Tobago
- ODI debut (cap 5): 23 June 1973 v New Zealand
- Last ODI: 20 July 1973 v England

Domestic team information
- Years: Team
- 1971: South Trinidad Women

Career statistics
Competition	WODI
Matches	6
Runs scored	65
Batting average	13
100s/50s	0/0
Top score	23*
Balls bowled	200
Wickets	6
Bowling average	12.16
5 wickets in innings	0
10 wickets in match	0
Best bowling	3/7
Catches/stumpings	0/–
- Source: ESPNcricinfo, 20 October 2017

Jane Joseph is a former Trinidadian cricketer who represented the Trinidad and Tobago women's national cricket team.

An all-rounder, Joseph played in all six women's One Day Internationals at the inaugural Women's Cricket World Cup in 1973 in England. Playing in matches against New Zealand, Australia, Jamaica, Young England, the International XI and England, she finished the tournament with a bowling average of 12.16 runs per wicket, the ninth best overall. Her best performance came in the match against Young England, where she took 3 wickets for 7 runs from 10 overs and made 23 not out with the bat.

Prior to the World Cup in February 1971, Joseph played in both Hayward Shield matches for Trinidad – a tri-series against England and Jamaica with Trinidad winning both the two-day games and the tournament. She also played in a 1-day single innings match for South Trinidad against the same touring English women side where she took 2/61 from 9 overs.
