= Hyacinth Flemmings =

Jamaican cricketer

International information
- National side: Jamaica (1973)
- Only ODI (cap 13): 11 July 1973 v Australia

Career statistics
Competition	ODI
Matches	1
Runs scored	0
Batting average	0
100s/50s	0/0
Top score	0
Balls bowled	12
Wickets	0
Bowling average	–
5 wickets in innings	0
10 wickets in match	–
Best bowling	0/11
Catches/stumpings	0/0
- Source: ESPNcricinfo, 2 July 2019

Hyacinth Flemmings (possibly Hyacinth Fleming) is a Jamaican former cricketer who played one match, a One Day International, during the 1973 Women's Cricket World Cup for the Jamaica women's national cricket team. Flemmings bowled two overs, conceding 11 runs, against Australia. She also batted at number 11, but did not score any runs.
