= Shimon Attie =

American visual artist

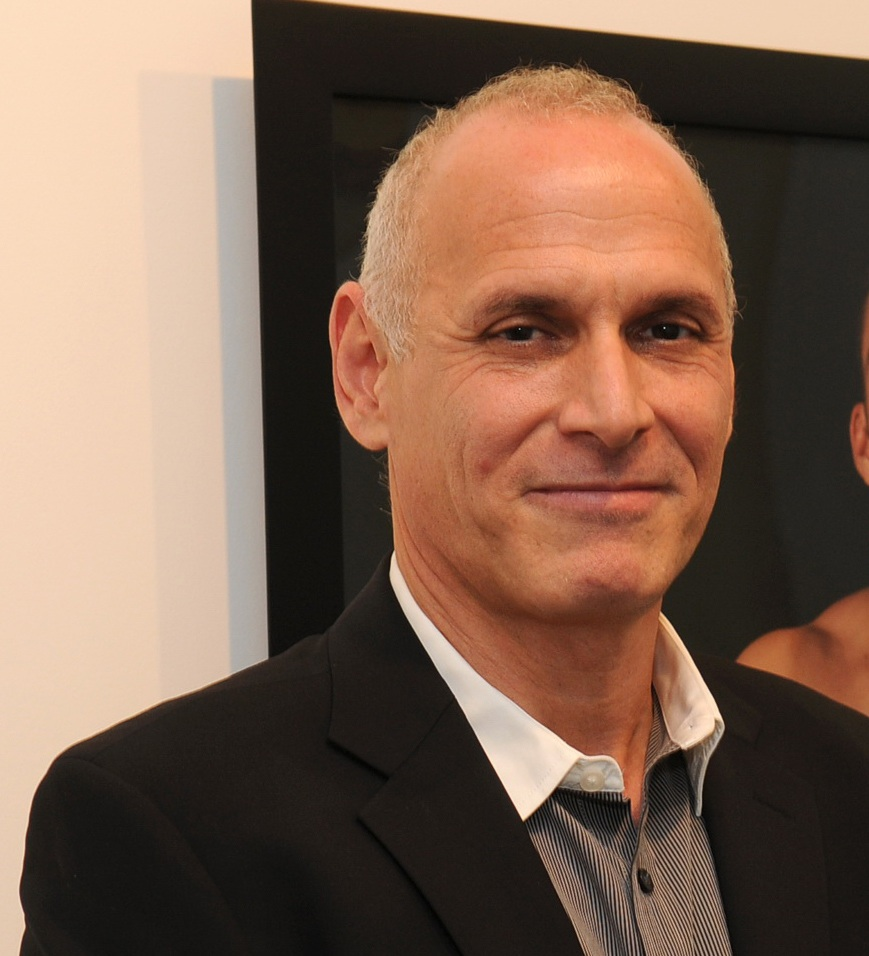
- Born: 1957 (age 68–69); Los Angeles, California, US
- Education: San Francisco State University
- Known for: Photography, installation art, video, public art
- Awards: Guggenheim Fellowship; Rome Prize; Pollock-Krasner Foundation; Harvard Radcliffe Institute
- Website: Shimon Attie

Shimon Attie (born 1957) is a contemporary visual artist based in New York City. He is known for nuanced, often deeply researched projects situated between installation art, video and photography. His work encompasses time-based, site-specific public art, immersive mixed-media installations for exhibition spaces, photographic series that include the documentation of public interventions, monographs and new media. Attie's subject matter centers on marginalized histories and communities, examining instances of trauma, displacement and disenfranchisement while also highlighting themes of community, endurance, perseverance and humanity. Curator Hannah Klemm wrote, "Attie's practice explores ideas of space, place, social memory and identity. His multifaceted projects shine a light on what has been lost, buried or forgotten … expos[ing] the layers of history that construct our world."

Attie's art belongs to public collections including the Museum of Modern Art, Centre Georges Pompidou, National Gallery of Art, Art Institute of Chicago, San Francisco Museum of Modern Art, de Young Museum, Jewish Museum, and Museum of Contemporary Photography. He has also exhibited at those venues, as well as at the Institute of Contemporary Art, Boston, Aldrich Contemporary Art Museum and Wexner Center for the Arts, among others. Attie has been recognized with Guggenheim and Harvard Radcliffe Institute fellowships, a Rome Prize and the Lee Krasner Award (Pollock-Krasner Foundation).

== Early life and career ==
Attie was born (1957) and raised in Los Angeles. He initially studied psychology and was a psychotherapist in San Francisco before turning to art and photography; some writers have related this background to his work's longstanding interest in uncovering hidden layers of meaning.

After completing an MFA at San Francisco State University in 1991, Attie relocated to Berlin to become a full-time artist, inspired by a trip there the prior year shortly after the fall of the Berlin Wall. At a time when European artists were exploring how new media might examine Germany's troubled history, he focused his work on its Jewish community before and during the Nazi era. Attie returned to San Francisco in 1996 before moving to New York City the following year.

Shimon Attie, Almstadtstrasse 43, slide projection of former Hebrew bookstore, 1930, Berlin, "The Writing on the Wall" series, Chromogenic photograph and on-location installation, 33" x 39", 1992.

== Work and reception ==
Attie's early projects involved dramatic on-site projections of archival photographs and written documents on contemporary sites and were described as collage-like and ghostly. His method created a confrontation between the physicality of the present and the immateriality and ephemerality of the projected (absent) past, memory and light, recovering histories obscured by time or potentials never achieved. Art in America critic Norman Kleeblatt compared the aesthetic strategies and baroque tableaux of this work to those of Pepón Osorio and Jeff Wall, as well as to the art of Marcel Broodthaers, writing "Attie is first and foremost an artist-anthropologist, a practitioner who digs into archives and then reconfigures his non-artistic source material into complicated artworks." Since 2006, much of Attie's work has involved community-based projects in which he collaborates directly with refugee, immigrant, minority and survivor communities that have suffered trauma. These projects often consist of photographic and video or video/performance installations whose deliberate, human-centered tableaux he films with aesthetics influenced by old master painting.

=== Photographic and public art projects, (1991–2005) ===
Attie attracted wide attention for projects in the 1990s that represented the experience of Jewish communities destroyed by the Nazi regime, the most prominent being a haunting photographic series and monograph, The Writing on the Wall (1992–93). After combing historical archives, he projected black-and-white, pre-Holocaust photographs he found of Jewish street life onto identical or nearby building fronts in East Berlin's run-down former Jewish Quarter at life-size scale, then photographed the results in color at night. The projections of Yiddish-language businesses and everyday people seemingly oblivious to the camera (and their impending fate) both blended into and uneasily jostled against color surroundings of contemporary vehicles, billboards and graffiti. Critics described the results as "sad, eerie collages of time," that gave visual form to an invisible, obliterated past yet also lent the subjects an immediate, present-day universality. New York Times critic Charles Hagen described Attie's technique as "uncanny, creating the sense that the surfaces of the scenes themselves are being peeled back like old wallpaper to reveal the history buried beneath them." In a more open-ended series, "The History of Another" (2002–03), Attie projected photographs of various marginalized populations in turn-of-the-20th-century Rome onto contemporary sites, using the city's overlay of 2,700 years of architecture to raise questions about which groups are included or excluded from history.

Shimon Attie, I remember when we lived in a tenement on the top floor in very bad condition. It was like a dream..., Lasers writing out a senior's memory, "Between Dreams and History" series, on-location laser installation and lambda photograph, 24" x 65", 1998.

In several projects, Attie turned to the experiences of still-living immigrant populations. "Sites Unseen" (1995–96) was a series of four public installations across European cities that addressed site-specific sociopolitical moments of the past and present. It included Portraits of Exile (1995)—an installation of nine large light boxes submerged underwater in a canal in front of the Danish parliament. The embedded close-up portraits of the series connected the dramatic 1943 Danish rescue of Jews on fishing boats to the country's housing of present-day asylum seekers in crowded container ships in Copenhagen harbor. For his first American public project, the site-specific laser installation Between Dreams and History (1998, Creative Time), Attie collected handwritten memories, dreams and prayers from the diverse communities of Manhattan's Lower East Side, seeking to give voice to the collective poetics of their immigrant experiences. He then used a custom animated projection program to write the messages out of thin air out in laser light onto neighborhood buildings, letter by letter and in their native languages.

In a departure, Attie's "Untitled Memory" series (1998) turned from public memory to a more intimate, personal key in which he overlaid projected, elegiac images of solitary friends and family onto his own former domestic spaces and photographed the results.

Shimon Attie, Untitled Video Still, The Crossing, 8-minute single-channel video with 4.1 audio, dimensions variable, 2017.

=== Community and site-based projects (2006–present) ===
Attie's community-based projects often examine how history, individual and collective trauma, and memory are both interlinked and malleable. The Attraction of Onlookers: An Anatomy of a Welsh Village (2008, National Museum of Wales) offered a restrained yet intimate portrait of the community of Aberfan, 40 years after a human-caused mountainside disaster buried the town's only grammar school, taking the lives of a generation of children and many adults. Attie filmed individuals rotating slowly on a platform in a darkened void as they "performed" their real roles—some iconic Welsh tropes identifiable by their tools of trade or uniforms—recasting the village as also typical as it attempted to move beyond the catastrophe, public scrutiny and resulting loss of privacy. The Crossing (2017) used a gambling metaphor to dramatize the extraordinary risks taken by migrants in times of crisis. The film depicts seven Syrian refugees (recent arrivals in Europe) at a casino engaged in a game of roulette that unfolds in seven slow-moving tableaux without dialogue. The sequences were determined by the refugees' experiences of exile and flight and featured a person disappearing without explanation, until only one participant remained.

The floating media installation Night Watch (2018–21) explored loss, displacement, inclusion and the building of community. Traveling waterways around New York City on a barge during the fall 2018 UN General Assembly Week, the project (which also appeared in the San Francisco Bay in 2021) blended human and metaphoric dimensions: waterways as sites of escape and rescue, the resemblance of a barge to a raft. Its looping 20-foot screen displayed silent video portraits—figures emerging from darkness, approaching, and in close-up, gazing intently—of twelve New Yorkers recently granted political asylum in the US after fleeing violence and discrimination from diverse homelands.

Shimon Attie, Night Watch (Norris at Sunset), 20'-wide LED screen on barge, Hudson River, 30" x 45" lambda photograph, 2019.

In other projects, Attie considered the ways space and place both define and are defined by communities. For Facts on the Ground (2014), he interrupted desert and urban landscapes across Israel and Palestine with custom-made light boxes that illuminated short, enigmatic or poetic phrases, employing compositions and locations carefully chosen for their historical, sociopolitical and physical specifics. Lost in Space (After Huck) (2017, Saint Louis Art Museum) was an immersive, site-specific installation that drew inspiration from that city's location on the Mississippi River and proximity to the city of Ferguson, a site of racial tensions in the US. The installation centered on an otherworldly cast-resin sculpture of a raft, which appeared to float in surrounding celestial space (actually animated NASA images of American cities at night seen from space). Referencing both the journey in Mark Twain's Adventures of Huckleberry Finn and recent events, the raft juxtaposed rustic, anachronistic objects with one contemporary item—a softly glowing bright red police light—a contrast echoed in the work's aural mix of natural and abstracted news-media sounds.

Like Lost in Space, Attie's commissioned installation at Lehigh University Art Galleries in Bethlehem, PA, Starstruck: An American Tale (2022), introduced sculptural elements alongside multi-channel video. It examined Bethlehem as a microcosm of America and representation of how histories, personal narratives and social and economic systems are interconnected. The installation featured two walls of projected video representing layers of Bethlehem's complex past, which flanked a replica of the city's 91-foot star symbol equipped with synchronized music and lighting that oscillated between "Christmas white" and a rotating color display akin to a casino wheel of fortune. Its references included the city's founding by Moravian Christian reformist settlers in 1741, its late 19th- to 20th-century industrial heyday as a steel capital and subsequent Rust Belt collapse, which saw the steel plant shuttered and transformed into a casino. Moving between still shots and slow camerawork, the video's collapse of time and narrative embodied moments of overlap and rupture in the public sphere and built environment that offer opportunities for dialogue and change.

== Collections and recognition ==
Attie's work belongs to the public collections of the Art Institute of Chicago, Berlinische Galerie, Brandts Museum of Photographic Art, Centre Georges Pompidou, Cleveland Museum of Art, deCordova Museum and Sculpture Park, de Young Museum, Fond Nationale d'Art Contemporain (FNAC), High Museum of Art, International Center of Photography, Jewish Museum, Los Angeles County Museum of Art, Museum of Contemporary Photography, Museum of Fine Arts, Houston, Museum of Modern Art (New York), National Gallery of Art, Perez Art Museum Miami, Saint Louis Art Museum, San Francisco Museum of Modern Art, Santa Barbara Museum of Art, Smithsonian American Art Museum, and Tel Aviv Museum of Art, among others

Attie has been awarded a Rome Prize from the American Academy in Rome (2001), Harvard Radcliffe Institute fellowship (2006), John S. Guggenheim Fellowship (2008), and Pollock-Krasner Foundation Lee Krasner Award for lifetime achievement (2013, 2019). In 2018 he was inducted as member of National Academy of Design. He has received grants from Kunstfonds in Germany and the National Endowment for the Arts, New York Foundation for the Arts (NYFA) and New York State Council for the Arts (NYSCA) in the US. Attie has been an artist-in-residence at the Bau Institute, Headlands Center for the Arts, Macdowell, Wexner Center for the Arts and Yaddo, among others. His work has also been the subject of documentary films made by others that have aired on PBS, BBC and Germany's ARD.

== Monographs ==
- The Writing on the Wall: Projections in Berlin's Jewish Quarter; Shimon Attie – Photographs and Installations, essays by Michael A. Bernstein, Erwin Leiser and Shimon Attie, Heidelberg, Germany: Edition Braus, 1993
- Sites Unseen: Shimon Attie – European Projects, essay by James Young and introduction by Jill Medvedow, Heidelberg, Germany/Vermont, US: Edition Braus/Verve Editions, Institute of Contemporary Art, Boston, 1998
- The History of Another: Projections in Rome, Shimon Attie, Santa Fe, NM/Chicago: Twin Palms Press/The Museum of Contemporary Photography, 2004
- The Attraction of Onlookers: Aberfan – An Anatomy of a Welsh Village, Shimon Attie with foreword by John Humphrys, essays by Chris Townsend and Melanie Doel, Cardigan, Wales: Parthian Books, 2008
- Facts on the Ground, Shimon Attie with introduction by Mieke Bal, essay by Gannit Ankori/Samir Srouji, California, US: Nazraeli Press, 2016
- Starstruck: An American Tale, London: Black Dog Publishing, 2023
