= List of West Indies women Test cricketers =

A women's Test match is an international four-innings cricket match held over a maximum of four days between two of the leading cricketing nations. The West Indies women's cricket team first played Test cricket in the 1975–76 against Australia.

== Key ==
General

- ‡ – Captain
- † – Wicket-keeper
- First – Year of debut
- Last – Year of latest game
- Mat – Number of matches played
- Win% – Winning percentage

Batting

- Inn – Number of innings batted
- NO – Number of innings not out
- Runs – Runs scored in career
- HS – Highest score
- 100 – Centuries scored
- 50 – Half-centuries scored
- Avg – Runs scored per dismissal
- * – Batsman remained not out

Bowling

- Balls – Balls bowled in career
- Wkt – Wickets taken in career
- BBI – Best bowling in an innings
- BBM – Best bowling in a match
- Ave – Average runs per wicket

Fielding

- Ca – Catches taken
- St – Stumpings effected

== Test cricketers ==
Statistics are correct as of the West Indies women's most recent Test match, against Pakistan on 15 March 2004.

West Indies women Test cricketers
General					Batting							Bowling					Fielding	
No.	Name	First	Last	Mat	Inn	NO	Runs	HS	100	50	Avg	Balls	Wkt	BBI	BBM	Ave	Ca	St
1	Sheryl Bayley	1976	1979	11	13	2	85	35	0	0	7.72	1,560	16	3/70	3/31	30.62	2	–
2	Beverly Browne	1976	1979	11	17	0	324	72	0	2	19.05	54	0	–	–	–	2	–
3	Louise Browne ‡	1976	1979	9	14	2	348	67	0	2	29.00	0	–	–	–	–	4	–
4	Peggy Fairweather	1976	1979	10	12	5	110	23*	0	0	15.71	1,125	13	4/10	5/26	36.07	2	–
5	Gloria Gill	1976	1979	10	16	0	273	53	0	1	17.06	0	–	–	–	–	3	–
6	Vivalyn Latty-Scott	1976	1979	10	15	2	206	51*	0	1	15.84	1,909	25	5/48	5/48	20.12	9	–
7	Janet Mitchell †	1976	1976	1	1	0	4	4	0	0	4.00	0	–	–	–	–	0	0
8	Jasmine Sammy	1976	1979	6	9	0	134	43	0	0	14.88	168	4	3/22	3/22	9.75	2	–
9	Menota Tekah	1976	1976	5	7	0	57	22	0	0	8.14	6	0	–	–	–	0	–
10	Patricia Whittaker ‡	1976	1979	11	18	1	47	65	0	4	27.76	1,260	25	4/22	4/31	19.36	5	–
11	Grace Williams	1976	1979	11	15	1	293	63	0	0	20.92	965	15	4/30	4/30	27.20	7	–
12	Yolande Geddes-Hall †	1976	1979	10	15	3	280	44	0	0	23.33	0	–	–	–	–	13	2
13	Nora St. Rose	1976	1976	5	6	2	21	8	0	0	5.25	546	10	3/21	4/25	16.00	0	–
14	Dorothy Hobson	1976	1979	4	5	1	26	18	0	0	6.50	474	6	2/22	2/22	20.33	1	–
15	Joan Alexander-Serrano	1976	1976	1	1	0	4	4	0	0	4.00	6	0	–	–	–	0	–
16	Patricia Alfred	1979	1979	1	2	2	1	1*	0	0	–	98	0	–	–	–	0	–
17	Shirley-Ann Bonaparte	1979	1979	3	6	0	106	61	0	1	17.66	24	0	–	–	–	0	–
18	Merlyn Edwards	1979	1979	2	4	0	60	23	0	0	15.00	0	–	–	–	–	1	–
19	Candacy Atkins	2004	2004	1	2	1	7	6	0	0	7.00	150	1	1/49	1/56	56.00	1	–
20	Felicia Cummings	2004	2004	1	2	0	11	6	0	0	5.50	156	4	4/54	4/60	15.00	1	–
21	Verena Felicien	2004	2004	1	2	0	102	55	0	1	51.00	222	2	1/16	2/99	49.50	0	–
22	Doris Francis	2004	2004	1	2	1	46	46*	0	0	46.00	132	0	–	–	–	1	–
23	Nadine George †	2004	2004	1	2	0	140	118	1	0	70.00	0	–	–	–	–	1	0
24	Indomatie Goordial	2004	2004	1	2	0	8	5	0	0	4.00	108	0	–	–	–	0	–
25	Geneille Greaves	2004	2004	1	2	0	43	24	0	0	21.50	24	0	–	–	–	3	–
26	Juliana Nero	2004	2004	1	2	0	33	32	0	0	16.50	12	0	–	–	–	0	–
27	Stephanie Power ‡	2004	2004	1	2	0	76	57	0	1	38.00	0	–	–	–	–	0	–
28	Jacqueline Robinson	2004	2004	1	2	0	65	57	0	1	32.50	162	0	–	–	–	0	–
29	Envis Williams	2004	2004	1	2	0	24	13	0	0	12.00	168	2	1/8	2/51	25.50	0	–

== See also ==
- West Indian women's cricket team
- List of West Indies women ODI cricketers
- List of West Indies women Twenty20 International cricketers

== Bibliography ==
- Duncan, Isabelle (2013). Skirting the Boundary: A History of Women's Cricket. London: The Robson Press. ISBN 978-1-84954-546-4.
