= József (surname) =

József is a Hungarian surname. Notable people with the surname include:

- Attila József (1905–1937), Hungarian poet
- Áron József
- Dezső József Firtosi
- Etelka József
- Gábor József
- Jolán József

== See also ==
- Józsa (name)
- Joseph (surname)
