= George Joseph =

George Joseph may refer to:

- George W. Joseph (1872–1930), Oregon attorney
- George Joseph (activist) (1887–1938), lawyer and Indian independence activist
- George Joseph (banker), Indian banker
- George Joseph (insurer) (1921–2026), founder of Mercury Insurance Group of Los Angeles
- George Joseph (scientist) (born 1938), pioneer of satellite based imaging sensors in India
- George M. Joseph (1930–2003), chief judge of the Oregon Court of Appeals, 1981–1992
- George Francis Joseph (1764–1846), English portrait painter
- George Joseph (Australian politician), lord mayor of Adelaide, South Australia, 1977–1979
- George Joseph (diplomat) (1950–2017), Indian diplomat
- George Gheverghese Joseph, Indian-born African mathematician
