= List of Jamaica women ODI cricketers =

This is a list of Jamaican women's One-day international cricketers. Overall, 13 Jamaican women have played in at least one women's one-day international. A One Day International, or an ODI, is an international cricket match between two representative teams, each having ODI status. An ODI differs from Test matches in that the number of overs per team is limited, and that each team has only one innings. The list is arranged in the order in which each player won her first ODI cap. Where more than one player won her first ODI cap in the same match, their surnames are listed alphabetically.

All six of Jamaica women's ODI matches were played during the 1973 Women's Cricket World Cup.

== List of Jamaican ODI players ==
Statistics from Cricinfo.

Jamaican ODI cricketers				Batting					Bowling						Fielding	
Cap	Name	Career	Mat	Inn	NO	Runs	HS	Avg	Balls	Mdn	Runs	Wkt	Best	Avg	Ca	St
1	Evelyn Bogle	1973	5	5	0	77	45	15.40	222	3	132	4	2/44	33.00	1	0
2	Dorrett Davis	1973	3	3	0	14	13	4.66	0	0	0	0	-	-	1	0
3	Elaine Emmanual	1973	5	5	1	33	13*	8.25	12	0	12	0	-	-	0	
4	Peggy Fairweather^{1}	1973	5	5	0	70	27	14.00	318	16	110	5	2/23	22.00	0	0
5	Yolande Geddes-Hall^{1}	1973	5	5	2	70	30*	23.33	0	0	0	0	-	-	3	3
6	Dorothy Hobson^{1}	1973	5	4	1	6	6	2.00	322	3	146	4	2/45	36.50	0	0
7	Vivalyn Latty-Scott^{1}	1973	5	5	0	168	61	33.60	315	8	131	5	2/15	26.20	2	0
8	Loretta McIntosh	1973	5	5	0	39	20	7.80	0	0	0	0	-	-	0	0
9	Yvonne Oldfield	1973	4	4	1	7	7	2.33	6	0	4	0	-	-	0	0
10	Madge Stewart	1973	4	4	2	1	1	0.50	84	3	44	5	4/9	8.80	0	0
11	Grace Williams^{1}	1973	5	5	0	108	40	21.60	334	13	116	7	4/11	16.57	1	0
12	Audrey McInnis	1973	3	3	0	4	3	1.33	0	0	0	0	-	-	0	0
13	Hyacinth Flemmings	1973	1	1	0	0	0	0.00	12	0	11	0	-	-	0	0

Note:

- ^{1} These players have also played ODI cricket for the West Indies. Only their records for Jamaica are shown above.
