= Maureen Phillips =

Personal information
- Full name: Maureen Phillips
- Role: Bowler

International information
- National side: Trinidad and Tobago
- ODI debut (cap 8): 23 June 1973 v New Zealand
- Last ODI: 18 July 1973 v International XI

Career statistics
| Competition | WODI |
|---|---|
| Matches | 2 |
| Runs scored | 11 |
| Batting average | 11 |
| 100s/50s | 0/0 |
| Top score | 10* |
| Balls bowled | 60 |
| Wickets | 1 |
| Bowling average | 36.00 |
| 5 wickets in innings | 0 |
| 10 wickets in match | 0 |
| Best bowling | 1/26 |
| Catches/stumpings | 0/– |
- Source: ESPNcricinfo, 20 October 2017

Maureen Phillips is a former Trinidadian cricketer who represented the Trinidad and Tobago women's national cricket team.

A bowler, Phillips played in two women's One Day Internationals at the inaugural Women's Cricket World Cup in 1973 in England. Playing in matches against New Zealand and the International XI she finished the tournament with just one wicket – that of New Zealand middle order batsman Shirley Cowles, out leg before wicket for six runs.
