= Bo Joseph =

Contemporary artist

- Citizenship: American
- Occupation: Contemporary artist
- Known for: Abstract art
- Website: bojoseph.com

Bo Joseph is an American contemporary artist known for abstract paintings, drawings, and sculptural works.

== Education and career ==
Joseph earned a Bachelor of Fine Arts from the Rhode Island School of Design in 1992. His work examines how symbols and objects change meaning across different cultures and historical periods. His compositions often include fragmented images of masks, ritual objects, tools, and architectural forms layered within abstract surfaces. Joseph received the Basil H. Alkazzi Award and was awarded painting fellowships from the Provincetown Fine Arts Work Center and the Rhode Island State Council on the Arts.

== Solo exhibitions ==
- 2026: Chasing Ghosts, SLAG&RX, New York
- 2023: Holding Spaces, McClain Gallery, Houston
- 2020: Feeding the Beast, McClain Gallery, Houston
- 2017: House of Mirrors, Lee Eugean Gallery, Seoul, South Korea
- 2016: A Season of Psychic Noise, Sears-Peyton Gallery, New York
- 2015: Souvenirs from Nowhere, McClain Gallery, Houston
- 2015: Hiding in Plain Sight, Sears-Peyton Gallery, New York
- 2012: Empire of Spoils, McClain Gallery, Houston
- 2010: A Lexicon of Persistent, Absence, Froelick Gallery, Portland
- 2010: Attempts at a Unified Theory, Thompson Gallery, Garthwaite Center for Science and Art, the Cambridge School of Weston, Weston
- 2007: Bo Joseph: Archetypes and Anomalies, Sears-Peyton Gallery, New York

== Group exhibitions ==
- 2025: This is a Thing, RISD Museum, Providence
- 2025: Seeking Complexity, Bill Arning Exhibitions, Kinderhook
- 2024: The Brooklyn Artists Exhibition, Brooklyn Museum, Brooklyn
- 2024: Intricate Abstractions: A Mini Exhibition from the ZAM Collection, Zillman Art Museum, University of Maine Museum of Art, Bangor
- 2022: Discarded/Sourced, Springfield Museum of Art, Springfield
- 2019: Unfoldingobject — The Art of Collage, Concord Art Association, Concord

== Collections ==
- Guilin Art Museum Guilin, China
- Kemper Museum of Contemporary Art, Kansas City
- RISD Museum, Providence
- Museum of Fine Arts, Houston
- The Springfield Museum of Art, Springfield
- University of Maine Museum of Art, Bangor
