= Jeanette James =

Trinidadian cricketer (born 1946)

Personal information
- Full name: Jeanette James
- Born: 15 November 1946 (age 79); Trinidad
- Role: All-rounder

International information
- National side: Trinidad and Tobago (1973)
- ODI debut (cap 14): 30 June 1973 v Australia
- Last ODI: 18 July 1973 v International XI

Career statistics
| Competition | WODI |
|---|---|
| Matches | 4 |
| Runs scored | 8 |
| Batting average | 4.00 |
| 100s/50s | 0/0 |
| Top score | 7 |
| Balls bowled | 132 |
| Wickets | 3 |
| Bowling average | 21.66 |
| 5 wickets in innings | 0 |
| 10 wickets in match | 0 |
| Best bowling | 1/6 |
| Catches/stumpings | 0/– |
- Source: CricketArchive, 19 December 2021

Jeanette James (born 15 November 1946) is a Trinidadian former cricketer who played as an all-rounder. She appeared in four One Day Internationals for Trinidad and Tobago at the 1973 World Cup. She made her One Day International debut in a group stage match against Australia.
