= Florence Douglas =

Trinidadian cricketer

Personal information
- Full name: Florence Douglas
- Born: Trinidad
- Role: Bowler

International information
- National side: Trinidad and Tobago (1973)
- ODI debut (cap 12): 30 June 1973 v Australia
- Last ODI: 20 July 1973 v England

Career statistics
Competition	WODI
Matches	3
Runs scored	0
Batting average	0.00
100s/50s	0/0
Top score	0*
Balls bowled	53
Wickets	1
Bowling average	36.00
5 wickets in innings	0
10 wickets in match	0
Best bowling	1/11
Catches/stumpings	0/–
- Source: CricketArchive, 19 December 2021

Florence Douglas is a Trinidadian former cricketer who played as a bowler. She appeared in three One Day Internationals for Trinidad and Tobago at the 1973 World Cup.
