= Lorna McKoy =

Jamaican cricketer

Personal information
- Full name: Lorna McKoy
- Born: Jamaica
- Batting: Right-handed
- Bowling: Right-arm medium
- Role: Bowler

International information
- National side: West Indies (1997)
- ODI debut (cap 35): 15 December 1997 v New Zealand
- Last ODI: 20 December 1997 v Denmark

Domestic team information
- Years: Team
- 1990–2001: Jamaica

Career statistics
| Competition | WODI | WFC | WLA |
|---|---|---|---|
| Matches | 2 | 4 | 12 |
| Runs scored | 1 | 1 | 74 |
| Batting average | 1.00 | 1.00 | 37.00 |
| 100s/50s | 0/0 | 0/0 | 0/0 |
| Top score | 1 | 1 | 43* |
| Balls bowled | 102 | 156 | 102 |
| Wickets | 0 | 11 | 25 |
| Bowling average | – | 11.00 | 9.12 |
| 5 wickets in innings | 0 | 0 | 2 |
| 10 wickets in match | 0 | 0 | 0 |
| Best bowling | – | 3/11 | 6/14 |
| Catches/stumpings | 0/– | 0/– | 0/– |
- Source: CricketArchive, 16 March 2022

Lorna McKoy is a Jamaican former cricketer who played primarily as a right-arm medium bowler. She appeared in two One Day Internationals for the West Indies, both at the 1997 World Cup. She played domestic cricket for Jamaica.
