= John Joseph =

John Joseph may refer to:

- John Joseph (historian) (1923–2020), American educator and Middle East historian
- John Joseph (bishop) (1932–1998), Catholic bishop of Faisalabad, Pakistan
- John Joseph (singer) (born 1962), American hardcore punk singer
- Mar Hnan-Isho II (fl. 774–780), a.k.a. John Joseph, Patriarch of the Church of the East
- John C. Joseph, documentary filmmaker who won an Academy Award for Gravity Is My Enemy
- John Joseph, screenwriter whose works include the film Change of Habit
- John Joseph of the Cross (1654–1739), Italian saint
- John Joseph of Austria, Spanish general and political figure
- John Joseph (rebel), African-American participant in the 1854 Eureka Rebellion in Australia

== See also ==
- Joseph (surname)
