= List of Trinidad and Tobago women ODI cricketers =

This is a list of Trinidad and Tobagonian women's One-day international cricketers. Overall, 14 Trinidad and Tobagonian women have played in at least one women's one-day international. A One Day International, or an ODI, is an international cricket match between two representative teams, each having ODI status. An ODI differs from Test matches in that the number of overs per team is limited, and that each team has only one innings. The list is arranged in the order in which each player won her first ODI cap. Where more than one player won her first ODI cap in the same match, those players are listed alphabetically by surname.

All six of Trinidad and Tobago women's ODI matches were played during the 1973 Women's Cricket World Cup.

== Key ==
General

- ‡ – Captain
- † – Wicket-keeper
- Mat – Number of matches played

Batting

- Inn – Number of innings batted
- NO – Number of innings not out
- Runs – Runs scored in career
- HS – Highest score
- Avg – Runs scored per dismissal
- * – Batsman remained not out

Bowling

- Balls – Balls bowled in career
- Wkt – Wickets taken in career
- BBI – Best bowling in an innings
- Ave – Average runs per wicket

Fielding

- Ca – Catches taken
- St – Stumpings effected

== Players ==
Statistics from Cricinfo.

Trinidad and Tobago ODI cricketers				Batting					Bowling						Fielding	
Cap	Name	Career	Mat	Inn	NO	Runs	HS	Avg	Balls	Mdn	Runs	Wkt	Best	Avg	Ca	St
1	Beverly Browne^{1}	1973	6	6	0	97	36	16.16	23	0	11	1	1/5	11.00	1	0
2	Louise Browne^{1}	1973	6	6	1	150	50*	30.00	0	0	0	0	-	-	4	0
3	Joyce Demmin	1973	6	6	2	78	26*	19.50	246	12	102	3	2/36	34.00	2	0
4	Christine Jacobson	1973	6	5	0	42	16	8.40	426	19	144	8	3/15	18.00	0	0
5	Jane Joseph	1973	6	6	1	65	23*	13.00	200	11	73	6	3/7	12.16	0	0
6	Janice Moses	1973	3	3	0	2	2	0.66	96	3	55	1	1/20	55.00	0	0
7	Emelda Noreiga	1973	4	4	0	14	8	3.50	0	0	0	0	-	-	3	0
8	Maureen Phillips	1973	2	2	1	11	10*	11.00	60	0	36	1	1/26	36.00	0	0
9	Nora St Rose	1973	6	3	2	2	2	2.00	396	27	82	8	3/16	10.25	0	0
10	Jasmine Sammy^{1}	1973	4	4	0	16	16	4.00	6	0	8	0	0/8	-	0	0
11	Menota Tekah	1973	6	6	0	28	12	4.66	20	0	12	0	-	-	0	0
12	Florence Douglas	1973	3	2	1	0	0*	0.00	53	0	36	1	1/11	36.00	0	0
13	Merlyn Edwards^{1}	1973	4	4	0	8	5	2.00	0	0	0	0	-	-	1	0
14	Jeanette James	1973	4	3	1	8	7	4.00	132	2	65	3	1/6	21.66	0	0

Notes ^{1} These players also played ODI cricket for the West Indies. Only their records for Trinidad and Tobago are shown above.

== See also ==
- Trinidad and Tobago women's cricket team
