= Richard Whitten =

American painter

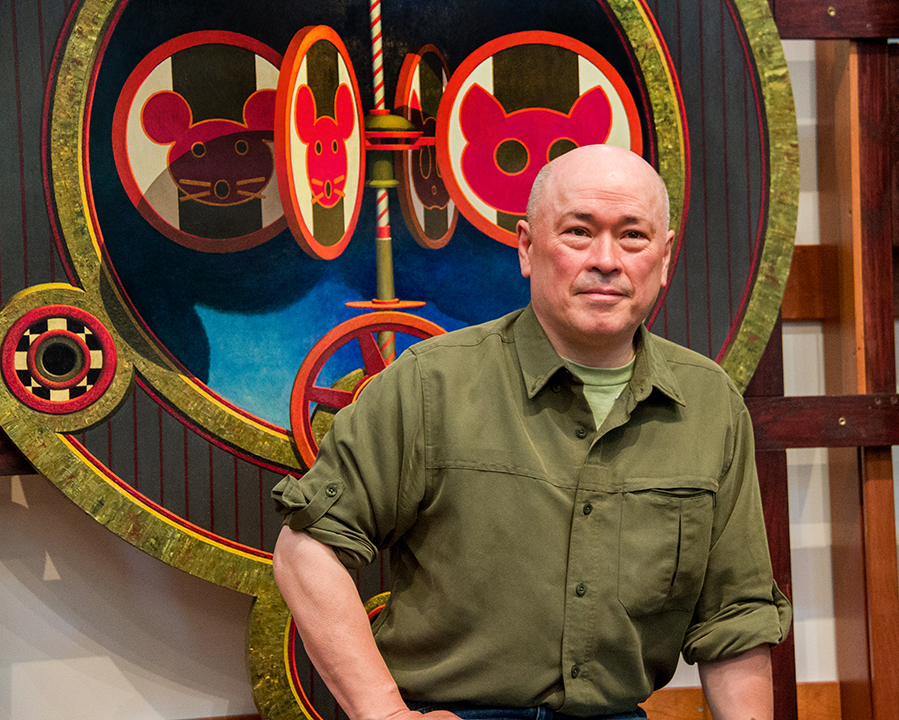
- The artist in front of his painting "Orrery"
- Known for: painting, sculpture
- Website: richardwhitten.com

Richard Whitten (born 1958) is a painter and sculptor of mixed Asian and American ancestry working in Rhode Island. His early work could loosely be termed geometric abstractions, but he is best known for his later representational paintings that combine an interest in architecture, invented machinery and toys. Whitten is also known for his toy-like sculptures. Whitten was the chair of the art department at Rhode Island College (2016-2018) and continues to teach there as part of the faculty.

Whitten's work has been displayed in solo exhibitions at the Newport Art Museum in Newport, RI, the Frye Art Museum in Seattle, WA, and the Zillman Art Museum (University of Maine Museum of Art), in Bangor, ME, and the Morris Museum in Morristown, NJ.

As of 2017, Whitten has been represented by Art Mora Gallery in New York, New Jersey, and Seoul, South Korea, and the William Scott Gallery in Provincetown, MA. He has been represented by the Clark Gallery in Lincoln, MA since 2009.

== Life and career ==
A native of New York City, Whitten attended the Collegiate School. He studied economics at Yale where he received his BA in 1980. He subsequently constructed a personal painting program at Yale, studying with Gretna Campbell and Samia Halaby. In 1987, he received an MFA at the University of California, Davis, under the instruction of Wayne Thiebaud, Squeak Carnwath, David Hollowell, Mike Henderson, Manuel Neri, Harvey Himelfarb, and Robert Arneson. He began teaching at Penn State in 1989. Later, he moved to Rhode Island where he became professor of Painting at Rhode Island College in 2006. He and his wife, Jeanne, live in an historic, late 19th-century Arts & Crafts styled house in Rhode Island. The house’s curvilinear dark moldings, marquetry and overall interior decor, which Whitten curates with collections of mechanical objects, metal discs, levers and pulleys both purposeful and purposeless, perfectly complement his painting sensibility.

Presently he continues in his position of Professor of painting. Whitten's paintings and drawings are representational but have strong ties to geometric abstraction.

Whitten's work has been discussed in the feature article, "Richard Whitten: Portals to the Unconscious" by Holly Davis in Artists Magazine, Jan/Feb 2017 issue. His work was included in the Rhode Island PBS video series: "Networks 2015-2016. His paintings have been featured on the cover of both Artist Magazine (October 2017) and American Psychologist Magazine (January 2016).

In 2017 he was invited to speak at the "Presence of China: International Contemporary Art Forum", Sanya, Hainan Province, China. In 2023, he received a Pollock-Krasner Foundation Grant to pursue his project, The Galileo Illuminated Manuscript: Crosscurrents of Chinese and European Scientific Thought.

== The Galileo Illuminated Manuscript: Crosscurrents of Chinese and European Scientific Thought ==
Inspired by the collection of historical machines at the Museo Galileo: The Museum of the History of Science located in Florence, Italy, Whitten developed The Galileo Illuminated Manuscript: Crosscurrents of Chinese and European Scientific Thought. The “pages” of this fictional illuminated catalog are actually 15.5” x 12.5” paintings on shaped panels. Inspired by and incorporating elements from Renaissance illuminated manuscripts, six of the paintings depict instruments which are actually part of the museum’s collection and the other six depict instruments inspired by the machines in the collection, but that are of his own invention.

By inventing his own machines to add to the collection through this fictional catalog, Whitten takes a fresh approach to the relationship between art and science that combines his interests in the Eurocentric history of science and Renaissance illuminated manuscripts. His intention is that the viewer will be unable to determine which objects are from the real collection and which ones are invented. In so doing, he blurs the lines between purpose driven objects and art objects. In his invented machines, he highlights the Asian influences in the collection to underline the influence of Asian scientific knowledge and craft on the development of European Science.

Upon completion of the 12 paintings which will comprise The Galileo Illuminated Manuscript, Whitten will display them in an exhibition at the Bannister Gallery in April 2025 which is the campus art gallery at Rhode Island College.

== Games ==
Whitten's “games”, are paintings inspired by his life-long interest in dexterity toys. Dexterity toys are tiny glass-covered boxes containing a printed image on cardboard and ball bearings which can be maneuvered through a maze or puzzle. His own painted “games” are of his own invention and invite the viewer to play them in their mind.

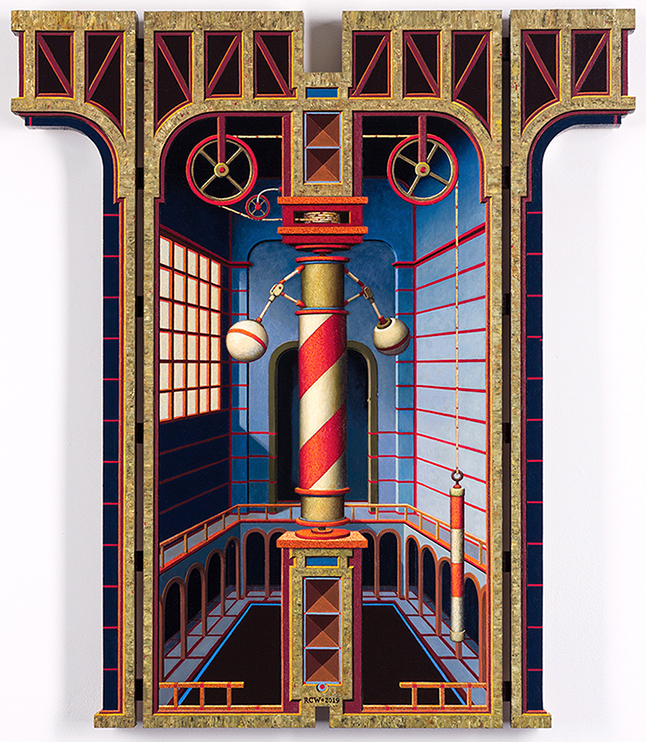
Richard Whitten, Metropolis, Oil on Wood Panel, 96" x 82", 2020.

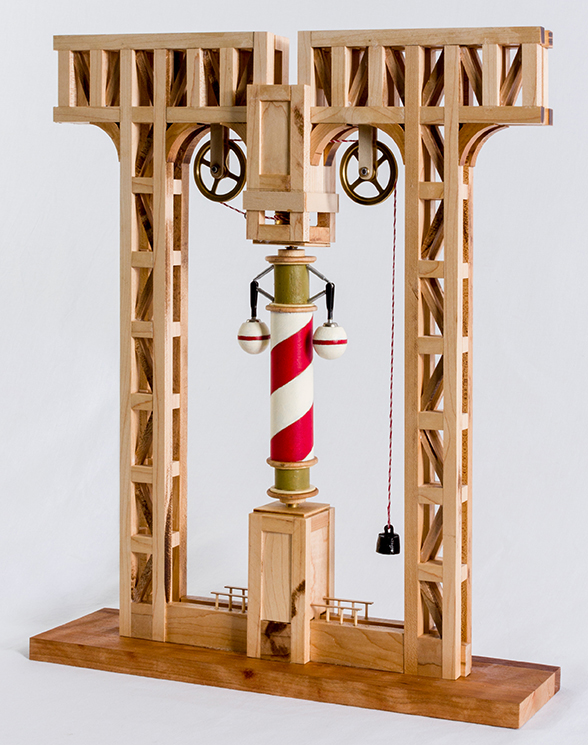
Richard Whitten, Régulateur de Vapeur, Sculpture.

== Exhibitions ==
Solo exhibitions of Whitten's work include:

- "Set in Motion", Morristown, NJ, March - September 2024
- “A Cabinet of Curious Matters”, Fenimore Museum, Cooperstown, NY, 2023
- “Grand Illusions” McGlothlin Center for the Arts, Emory and Henry College; Emory, VA, 2021
- "Hidden Worlds", Art Mora Gallery, New York, NY, 2017
- The William Scott Gallery, Provincetown, MA, 2023, 2021, 2019, 2018
- Art Mora Gallery, Ridgefield, NJ, 2021, 2017
- Clark Gallery, Lincoln, MA, 2018, 2016, 2014, 2010
- Cotuit Center for the Arts, Cotuit, MA, 2017
- "Studiolo" Zillman Art Museum of the University of Maine, Bangor, ME, 2016
- Dedee Shattuck Gallery, Westport, MA, 2014 (reviewed in Hyperallergic)
- Bannister Gallery of Rhode Island College, Providence, RI (catalog essay by John Yau)
- "Sacre Rouge" Trustman Gallery Simmons College, Boston, MA, 2014 (catalog essay by Brigitt Lynch)
- "Details of Thought" Towne Gallery, Wheelock College, Boston, MA, 2011
- "Passageways", Beard Gallery, Wheaton College (Massachusetts), Norton, MA, 2009 (catalog essay by Ann Murray)
- "Invisible Cities" Frye Art Museum, Seattle, WA, 1997 (catalog essay by Richard V. West)
- Mincher-Wilcox Gallery San Francisco, CA, 1989, 1990
- "Harlequin Series" Basement Workshop Gallery, New York, NY, 1986

== Residencies ==
- Yaddo, Saratoga Springs, NY, 2024
- Golden Apple, Fellowship, Harrington, ME, 2023, 2021
- Vermont Studio Center, 2013, 2017, 2018, 2019
- GEM Gallery & Sculpture Park, Gilbertsville, New York, 2019
- Ballinglen Foundation Fellowship, Ballycastle, Northern Ireland, 2007

== Awards and Grants ==
- Pollock-Krasner Foundation Grant, 2023
- Rhode Island State Council on the Arts (RISCA) Make Art Grant, 2023, 2022
- Berkshire Taconic Artist’s Resource Trust Grant, 2021
- Rhode Island Council on the Arts Fellowship in Painting Merit Award, 2017
- E.D. Foundation, Kearny, NJ, 1995-1996
- Rhode Island State Council on the Arts, 1993
- The Graham Foundation for Advanced Studies in the Fine Arts, Chicago, IL, 1990
- Artists' Space, New York, NY, 1983

== Collections ==
Whitten's work is included in the following permanent collections:

- Crocker Art Museum, Sacramento, CA
- Frye Art Museum, Seattle, WA
- Manetti Shrem Museum of Art, Davis, CA
- Fenimore At Museum, Cooperstown, NY
- Ballinglen Museum of Contemporary Art, Ballycastle, Ireland
- Triton Museum of Art, Santa Clara, CA
- University of Maine Museum of Art, Bangor, ME
- Newport Art Museum, Newport, RI
- Attleboro Art Museum, Attleboro, MA
- Gilbertsville Expressive Movement Foundation Sculpture Park, Gilbertsville, NY
- Fidelity Investments, Smithfield, RI
- Collegiate School (New York City), New York, NY

== Representative portfolio ==
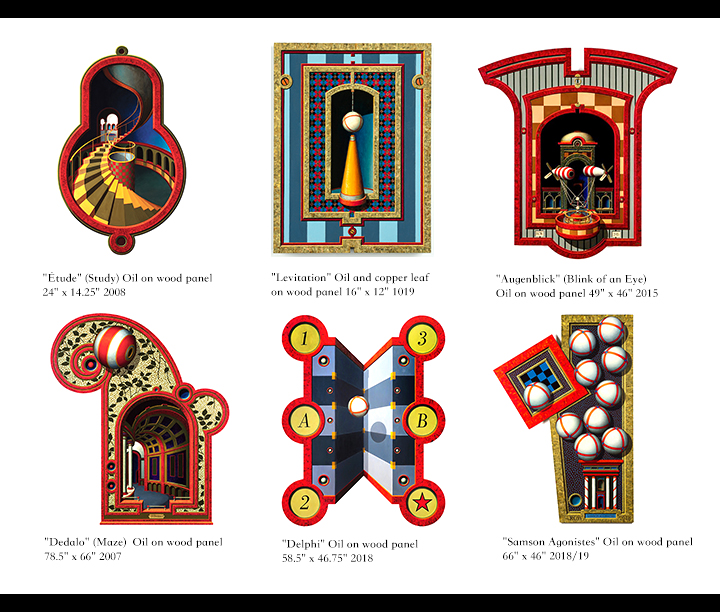
