= Felicia Walters =

Trinidadian cricketer (born 1992)

Personal information
- Full name: Felicia Walters
- Born: 6 January 1992 (age 34); Arena Road, Freeport, Trinidad
- Batting: Right-handed
- Bowling: Right-arm medium
- Role: Batter

International information
- National side: West Indies (2017)
- ODI debut (cap 83): 26 June 2017 v Australia
- Last ODI: 29 June 2017 v India
- ODI shirt no.: 71

Domestic team information
- Years: Team
- 2011–2018/19: Trinidad and Tobago

Career statistics
Competition	WODI
Matches	2
Runs scored	16
Batting average	8.00
100s/50s	0/0
Top score	9
Catches/stumpings	0/–
- Source: ESPNcricinfo, 21 May 2021

Felicia Walters (born 6 January 1992) is a Trinidadian cricketer who plays as an opening batter and part-time medium pace bowler. In May 2017, she was named in the West Indies squad for the 2017 Women's Cricket World Cup. She made her Women's One Day International (WODI) debut for the West Indies against Australia in the 2017 Women's Cricket World Cup on 26 June 2017. She played domestic cricket for Trinidad and Tobago.
