= Peggy Fairweather =

Jamaican cricketer

Personal information
- Full name: Ellicent Fairweather
- Born: Jamaica
- Batting: Right-handed
- Bowling: Right-arm medium-fast
- Role: Bowler

International information
- National sides: Jamaica (1973); West Indies (1976–1979)
- Test debut (cap 4): 7 May 1976; West Indies v Australia
- Last Test: 1 July 1979; West Indies v England
- ODI debut (cap 4/6): 30 June 1973; Jamaica v Young England
- Last ODI: 7 July 1979; West Indies v England

Domestic team information
- Years: Team
- 1973–1980: Jamaica

Career statistics
Competition	WTest	WODI	WFC	WLA
Matches	10	7	13	12
Runs scored	110	73	130	120
Batting average	15.71	12.16	14.44	13.33
100s/50s	0/0	0/0	0/0	0/0
Top score	23*	27	23*	28
Balls bowled	1,125	444	1,335	558
Wickets	13	6	26	7
Bowling average	36.07	26.33	19.42	27.71
5 wickets in innings	0	0	2	0
10 wickets in match	0	0	0	0
Best bowling	4/10	2/23	6/6	2/23
Catches/stumpings	2/–	1/–	3/–	1/–
- Source: CricketArchive, 18 December 2021

Ellicent "Peggy" Fairweather is a Jamaican former cricketer who played primarily as a right-arm medium-fast bowler. She appeared in five One Day Internationals for Jamaica at the 1973 World Cup, and ten Test matches and two One Day Internationals for the West Indies between 1976 and 1979. She also played domestic cricket for Jamaica.
