= Sheryl Bayley =

Barbadian cricketer

Personal information
- Full name: Sheryl Bayley
- Born: Barbados
- Batting: Right-handed
- Bowling: Right-arm off break
- Role: Bowler

International information
- National side: West Indies (1976–1979)
- Test debut (cap 1): 7 May 1976 v Australia
- Last Test: 1 July 1979 v England
- Only ODI (cap 1): 6 June 1979 v England

Domestic team information
- Years: Team
- 1975/76–1980: Barbados

Career statistics
Competition	WTest	WODI	WFC	WLA
Matches	11	1	15	5
Runs scored	85	–	108	13
Batting average	7.72	–	8.30	4.33
100s/50s	0/0	–	0/0	0/0
Top score	35	–	35	10
Balls bowled	1,560	60	1,998	256
Wickets	16	0	45	9
Bowling average	30.62	–	13.08	12.11
5 wickets in innings	0	0	3	1
10 wickets in match	0	0	1	0
Best bowling	3/70	–	9/9	5/6
Catches/stumpings	2/–	0/–	3/–	1/–
- Source: CricketArchive, 18 December 2021

Sheryl Bayley is a Barbadian former cricketer who played as a right-arm off-break bowler. She appeared in eleven Test matches and one One-Day International for the West Indies between 1976 and 1979. She played domestic cricket for Barbados.

In 1977, in a two-day match for Barbados against Guyana, Bailey took nine wickets for nine runs to help bowl the opposition out for 46.

In November 1976, her second innings performance of 2 wickets for 2 runs in seven overs, helped the West Indies beat the Indians at home by an ininngs and 24 runs in the 6th Test.
