= Trinidad and Tobago women's national cricket team =

Trinidad and Tobago
- Flag of Trinidad and Tobago

Personnel
- Captain: Anisa Mohammed
- Coach: Gibran Mohammed

Team information
- Founded: First recorded match: 1973

History
- First-class debut: Barbados in 1975 at Queen's Park Oval, Port of Spain
- S50 wins: 13
- T20 Blaze wins: 1

One Day Internationals
- First ODI: v New Zealand at Clarence Park, St Albans; 23 June 1973
- Last ODI: v England at Wolverhampton Cricket Club Ground, Wolverhampton; 20 July 1973
ODIs	Played	Won/Lost
Total	6	2/4 (0 ties, 0 no result)
- World Cup appearances: 1 (first in 1973)
- Best result: 5th (1973)
- As of 3 January 2019

The Trinidad and Tobago women's national cricket team, also known as Trinidad and Tobago Red Force Divas, is the women's representative cricket team of the country of Trinidad and Tobago. They compete in the Women's Super50 Cup and the Twenty20 Blaze.

In 1973, they competed in the first World Cup, finishing fifth with two victories. Since, the West Indies have competed as a united team, and Trinidad and Tobago have only competed at domestic level.

== History ==
Trinidad and Tobago first played in 1973, in the lead-up to the 1973 World Cup, which they competed in. They finished 5th in the group of 7, with two wins and four losses. Their victories came against Jamaica and Young England.

Trinidad and Tobago went on to compete in the inaugural Federation Championships in 1975–76, the first season of the West Indian women's domestic system. They finished second in the tournament in its second edition, in 1977, and won their first recorded title in 1989, winning the limited overs section of the Federation Championships.

Trinidad and Tobago went on to become the most successful team in the Federation Championships, with 13 recorded titles, and are the only team to have played in every season of the tournament. After the tournament was split into a league stage and knockout stage in the 1990s and 2000s, they have recorded title victories in 1992, 1994, 1996, 2002 and 2004, as well as winning both formats in 2003 and 2005.

Trinidad and Tobago won the Championships again in 2010, topping their group before beating Barbados in the semi-final and Saint Vincent and the Grenadines in the final. They claimed their most recent titles in two successive seasons, 2016 and 2016–17, beating Barbados in the final both times.

Trinidad and Tobago have also competed in the Twenty20 Blaze since its inception in 2012. They won the third edition of the tournament in 2016, topping their group before beating Jamaica in the final. In the most recent season, 2023, the side finished 5th in the T20 Blaze and were runners-up in the Super50 Cup.

== Players ==
=== Current squad ===
Based on squad announced for the 2023 season. Players in bold have international caps.

Name	Nationality	Birth date	Batting style	Bowling style	Notes
Batters
Shania Abdool	West Indies	Unknown	Unknown	Unknown	
**Britney Cooper**	West Indies	23 August 1989 (age 36)	Right-handed	Right-arm fast-medium	
Rachael Vincent	West Indies	Unknown	Left-handed	Unknown	
All-rounders
**Djenaba Joseph**	West Indies	Unknown	Right-handed	Right-arm medium	
Selene O'Neil	West Indies	3 June 1992 (age 33)	Left-handed	Right-arm medium	
Samara Ramnath	West Indies	Unknown	Right-handed	Right-arm medium	
Wicket-keepers
**Reniece Boyce**	West Indies	3 September 1997 (age 28)	Right-handed	–	
Shunelle Sawh	West Indies	17 July 2004 (age 21)	Right-handed	–	
Bowlers
**Kirbyina Alexander**	West Indies	6 July 1987 (age 38)	Right-handed	Right-arm fast-medium	
**Caniesha Isaac**	West Indies	Unknown	Right-handed	Right-arm medium	
**Lee-Ann Kirby**	West Indies	7 April 1987 (age 38)	Right-handed	Right-arm medium	
KD Jazz Mitchell	West Indies	27 August 2005 (age 20)	Right-handed	Right-arm medium	
**Anisa Mohammed**	West Indies	7 August 1988 (age 37)	Right-handed	Right-arm off break	Captain
**Karishma Ramharack**	West Indies	7 September 1988 (age 37)	Left-handed	Right-arm off break	
Shalini Samaroo	West Indies	21 September 2003 (age 22)	Left-handed	Right-arm off break	
Steffi Soogrim	West Indies	Unknown	Left-handed	Slow left-arm orthodox	

=== Notable players ===
Players who have played for Trinidad and Tobago and played internationally are listed below, in order of first international appearance (given in brackets). Players listed with a Trinidad and Tobago flag appeared for the side at the 1973 World Cup, which carried One Day International status:

- (Trinidad and Tobago) (Cricket West Indies) Beverly Browne (1973)
- (Trinidad and Tobago) (Cricket West Indies) Louise Browne (1973)
- (Trinidad and Tobago) Joyce Demmin (1973)
- (Trinidad and Tobago) Christine Jacobson (1973)
- (Trinidad and Tobago) Jane Joseph (1973)
- (Trinidad and Tobago) Janice Moses (1973)
- (Trinidad and Tobago) Emelda Noreiga (1973)
- (Trinidad and Tobago) Maureen Phillips (1973)
- (Trinidad and Tobago) (Cricket West Indies) Nora St. Rose (1973)
- (Trinidad and Tobago) (Cricket West Indies) Jasmine Sammy (1973)
- (Trinidad and Tobago) (Cricket West Indies) Menota Tekah (1973)
- (Trinidad and Tobago) Gloria Farrell (Note: Farrell played international cricket for International XI.) (1973)
- (Trinidad and Tobago) Florence Douglas (1973)
- (Trinidad and Tobago) (Cricket West Indies) Merlyn Edwards (1973)
- (Trinidad and Tobago) Jeanette James (1973)
- (Cricket West Indies) Shirley-Ann Bonaparte (1979)
- (Cricket West Indies) Ann Browne (1993)
- (Cricket West Indies) Eve Caesar (1993)
- (Cricket West Indies) Carol-Ann James (1993)
- (Cricket West Indies) Desiree Luke (1993)
- (Cricket West Indies) Cherry-Ann Singh (1993)
- (Cricket West Indies) Stephanie Power (1993)
- (Cricket West Indies) Ann McEwen (1997)
- (Cricket West Indies) Gwen Smith (1997)
- (Cricket West Indies) Brenda Solzano-Rodney (1997)
- (Cricket West Indies) Envis Williams (1997)
- (Cricket West Indies) Shane de Silva (2003)
- (Cricket West Indies) Nadine George (2003)
- (Cricket West Indies) Nelly Williams (2003)
- (Cricket West Indies) Felicia Cummings (2003)
- (Cricket West Indies) Anisa Mohammed (2003)
- (Cricket West Indies) Kirbyina Alexander (2005)
- (Cricket West Indies) (Barbados) Deandra Dottin (Note: Dottin has represented both the West Indies and Barbados in international cricket.) (2008)
- (Cricket West Indies) Stacy-Ann King (2008)
- (Cricket West Indies) Lee-Ann Kirby (2008)
- (Cricket West Indies) Merissa Aguilleira (2008)
- (Cricket West Indies) Gaitri Seetahal (2008)
- (Cricket West Indies) Amanda Samaroo (2009)
- (Cricket West Indies) Britney Cooper (2009)
- (Cricket West Indies) Felicia Walters (2017)
- (Cricket West Indies) Reniece Boyce (2017)
- (Cricket West Indies) Karishma Ramharack (2019)
- (Cricket West Indies) Caniesha Isaac (2021)
- (Cricket West Indies) Djenaba Joseph (2022)

== Honours ==
- Women's Super50 Cup:
  - Winners (13): 1989, 1992, 1994, 1996, 2002 (Knockout), 2003 (League), 2003 (Knockout), 2004 (Knockout), 2005 (League), 2005 (Knockout), 2010, 2016, 2016–17
- Twenty20 Blaze:
  - Winners (1): 2016

== Records ==
=== One-Day Internationals ===
- Highest team total: 124 vs Australia, 30 June 1973.
- Highest individual score: 50*, Louise Browne vs Jamaica, 4 July 1973.
- Best innings bowling: 3/7, Jane Joseph vs Young England, 14 July 1973.

Most ODI runs for Trinidad & Tobago Women
Player	Runs	Average	Career span
Louise Browne	150	30.00	1973
Beverly Browne	97	16.16	1973
Joyce Demmin	78	19.50	1973
Jane Joseph	65	13.00	1973
Christine Jacobson	42	8.40	1973

Most ODI wickets for Trinidad & Tobago Women
Player	Wickets	Average	Career span
Nora St. Rose	8	10.25	1973
Christine Jacobson	8	18.00	1973
Jane Joseph	6	12.16	1973
Jeanette James	3	21.66	1973
Joyce Demmin	3	34.00	1973

ODI record versus other nations
Opponent	M	W	L	T	NR	First	Last
Australia	1	0	1	0	0	1973	1973
England	1	0	1	0	0	1973	1973
International XI	1	0	1	0	0	1973	1973
Jamaica	1	1	0	0	0	1973	1973
New Zealand	1	0	1	0	0	1973	1973
Young England	1	1	0	0	0	1973	1973
Total	6	2	4	0	0	1973	1973

== See also ==
- List of Trinidad and Tobago women ODI cricketers
- Trinidad and Tobago national cricket team
- Trinbago Knight Riders (WCPL)
