= Gloria Gill =

West Indian cricketer

Personal information
- Full name: Gloria Gill
- Born: Barbados
- Batting: Right-handed
- Role: Batter

International information
- National side: West Indies (1976–1979)
- Test debut (cap 5): 7 May 1976 v Australia
- Last Test: 1 July 1979 v England
- ODI debut (cap 8): 6 June 1979 v England
- Last ODI: 7 July 1979 v England

Domestic team information
- Years: Team
- 1975/76–1980: Barbados

Career statistics
Competition	WTest	WODI	WFC	WLA
Matches	10	2	13	6
Runs scored	273	46	306	79
Batting average	17.06	23.00	16.10	13.16
100s/50s	0/1	0/0	0/1	0/0
Top score	53	31	53	31
Catches/stumpings	3/–	0/–	4/–	0/–
- Source: CricketArchive, 18 December 2021

Gloria Gill is a Barbadian former cricketer who played as a right-handed batter. She appeared in ten Test matches and two One Day Internationals for the West Indies, between 1976 and 1979. She made her debut for the West Indies in May 1976, in a Test against Australia. Her highest Test score was 53, made against India later that year. In all, she scored 273 Test runs and 46 ODI runs. She played domestic cricket for Barbados.
