= Chris Joseph =

Chris Joseph may refer to:

- Chris Joseph (autobiographer), British writer
- Chris Joseph (ice hockey) (born 1969), retired Canadian ice hockey defenceman
- Chris Joseph (writer/artist), British/Canadian multimedia writer and artist

== See also ==
- Kris Joseph (born 1988), Canadian basketball player
