= George Joseph (banker) =

- Occupations: Board of Directors, Muthoot Finance
- Website: syndicatebank.in

George Joseph is chairman and non-executive independent director at Wonderla Amusement Park and Resort, non-executive independent director at Muthoot Finance and he is the ex-chairman and managing director of Syndicate Bank.

He took over as the chairman and managing director on 2 August 2008. He joined Syndicate Bank in April 2006 as executive director.

Before joining Syndicate Bank he had worked with Canara Bank for 36 years. He joined Canara Bank as a probationary officer in 1969 and had worked in its different centers viz, Bangalore, Chennai, Kerala, Srinagar, Mumbai, Delhi etc.

Also while with Canara Bank, he was the chief executive of the Exchange Company at Bahrain under Canara Bank management.

He is a first-rank commerce graduate from Kerala University. He also ranked 1st among the Indian candidates and 11th in the AIB Examination (London) of the Institute of Bankers, London. He is also a Certified Associate of Indian Institute of Banking & Finance.

His term at Syndicate Bank expired on 30 April 2009.

He is now on the board of directors at Muthoot Finance as a non-executive independent director.

George Joseph is also the chairman and non-executive independent director at Wonderla Amusement Park and Resort. He was appointed as an additional director on 27 June 2011 and as director and chairman on 12 September 2011.

== See also ==
- Syndicate Bank
