= Margaret Peear =

English cricketer (born 1955)

Personal information
- Full name: Margaret Peear
- Born: 1955 (age 70–71); Surrey, England
- Batting: Right-handed
- Role: Batter

International information
- National side: England (1979)
- Only ODI (cap 27): 6 June 1979 v West Indies

Domestic team information
- Years: Team
- 1980–1982: East Anglia
- 1983–1987: Yorkshire

Career statistics
| Competition | WODI | WFC | WLA |
|---|---|---|---|
| Matches | 1 | 6 | 17 |
| Runs scored | – | 147 | 70 |
| Batting average | – | 16.33 | 4.66 |
| 100s/50s | – | 0/1 | 0/0 |
| Top score | – | 60 | 15 |
| Balls bowled | – | 30 | 96 |
| Wickets | – | 0 | 0 |
| Bowling average | – | – | – |
| 5 wickets in innings | – | 0 | 0 |
| 10 wickets in match | – | 0 | – |
| Best bowling | – | – | – |
| Catches/stumpings | 0/– | 4/– | 5/– |
- Source: CricketArchive, 13 March 2021

Margaret Peear (born 1955) is an English former cricketer who played as a right-handed batter. She appeared in one One Day Internationals for England, against the West Indies on 6 June 1979, but did not bat or bowl. She played domestic cricket for East Anglia and Yorkshire.
