= William Joseph =

William Joseph may refer to:

- William Joseph (governor), colonial governor of Maryland
- William Joseph (musician), American pianist and recording artist
- William Joseph (American football), American football player
- Will Joseph (rugby union, born 1877), Welsh rugby union player
- Will Joseph (rugby union, born 2002), English rugby union player
- Will Joseph (engineer), Formula One engineer
- Billy Joseph, Papua New Guinean minister for defense, politician, and former surgeon
