= Jacqueline Wainwright =

English cricketer (born 1947)

Personal information
- Full name: Jacqueline Anne Wainwright
- Born: 28 May 1947 (age 79); Hemel Hempstead, Hertfordshire, England
- Batting: Right-handed
- Bowling: Right-arm medium
- Role: All-rounder

International information
- National side: England (1979)
- Test debut (cap 85): 16 June 1979 v West Indies
- Last Test: 23 June 1979 v West Indies
- ODI debut (cap 28): 6 June 1979 v West Indies
- Last ODI: 7 July 1979 v West Indies

Domestic team information
- Years: Team
- 1972–1999: East Anglia

Career statistics
Competition	WTest	WODI	WFC	WLA
Matches	2	2	8	16
Runs scored	6	2	82	201
Batting average	–	–	20.50	16.75
100s/50s	0/0	0/0	0/0	0/2
Top score	6*	2*	21*	80*
Balls bowled	132	84	474	394
Wickets	0	0	4	11
Bowling average	–	–	66.25	21.09
5 wickets in innings	–	–	0	0
10 wickets in match	–	–	0	0
Best bowling	–	–	1/32	3/16
Catches/stumpings	1/–	0/–	1/–	2/–
- Source: CricketArchive, 27 February 2021

Jacqueline Anne Wainwright (born 28 May 1947) is an English former cricketer who played as a right-handed batter and right-arm off break bowler. She appeared in 2 Test matches and 2 One Day Internationals for England in 1979. She played domestic cricket for East Anglia.
