= Yolande Geddes-Hall =

Jamaican sportswoman

Personal information
- Full name: Yolande Geddes-Hall
- Born: Jamaica
- Batting: Right-handed
- Role: Wicket-keeper

International information
- National sides: Jamaica (1973); West Indies (1976–1979)
- Test debut (cap 12): 14 May 1976; West Indies v Australia
- Last Test: 1 July 1979; West Indies v England
- ODI debut (cap 5/7): 30 June 1973; Jamaica v Young England
- Last ODI: 7 July 1979; West Indies v England

Domestic team information
- Years: Team
- 1973–1992: Jamaica

Career statistics
Competition	WTest	WODI	WFC	WLA
Matches	10	7	14	14
Runs scored	280	80	384	260
Batting average	23.33	20.00	25.60	28.88
100s/50s	0/0	0/0	0/1	0/1
Top score	44	30*	58	61*
Catches/stumpings	13/2	3/4	14/5	5/7
- Source: CricketArchive, 17 December 2021

Yolande Geddes-Hall (née Geddes) is a Jamaican sportswoman who represented her country at four different sports. In cricket, she played as a wicket-keeper and right-handed batter. She appeared in five One Day Internationals, as captain, for Jamaica at the 1973 Women's Cricket World Cup, and ten Test matches and two One Day Internationals for the West Indies between 1976 and 1979. She has also represented Jamaica in netball, table tennis and softball. Yolande also played lawn tennis and loved swimming.
