= Steetley Company Ground =

Cricket ground in Shireoaks. Nottinghamshire

Coordinates: 53.3244°N 1.1702°W

- Interactive map of Steetley Company Ground

Ground information
- Location: Shireoaks, Nottinghamshire
- Country: England

International information
- Only women's ODI: 7 June 1979: England v West Indies

Team information
Nottinghamshire	(1961)
- As of 6 September 2020; Source: Ground profile

Steetley Company Ground is a cricket ground in Shireoaks, Nottinghamshire, England. The ground was laid out in 1951 and the first important match on the ground was in 1955, when the Nottinghamshire Second XI played the Yorkshire Second XI. The ground has played host to both Nottinghamshire Second XI and Derbyshire Second XI matches in the Second XI Championship and Second XI Trophy.

In 1961, the ground hosted a first-class match in the County Championship when Nottinghamshire played Sussex. Norman Hill of Nottinghamshire made 201 not out, then Alan Oakman of Sussex made 229 not out, and after two declarations Sussex won by nine wickets. The pitch and ground were excellent, but in the relatively remote location the gate takings were poor, and Nottinghamshire never played there again.

The ground held a single Women's One Day International in 1979 when England women played West Indies women.
