= Beverly Browne =

Trinidadian cricketer (born 1957)

Personal information
- Full name: Beverly Mary Browne
- Born: 27 March 1957 (age 69); Trinidad
- Died: 15 March 2022; Brooklyn, New York
- Batting: Right-handed
- Bowling: Right-arm medium
- Role: Batter
- Relatives: Louise Browne (sister); Ann Browne (sister)

International information
- National sides: Trinidad and Tobago (1973); West Indies (1976–1979)
- Test debut (cap 2): 7 May 1976; West Indies v Australia
- Last Test: 1 July 1979; West Indies v England
- ODI debut (cap 1/3): 23 June 1973; Trinidad and Tobago v New Zealand
- Last ODI: 7 July 1979; West Indies v England

Domestic team information
- Years: Team
- 1973–1982: Trinidad and Tobago

Career statistics
Competition	WTest	WODI	WFC	WLA
Matches	11	8	13	12
Runs scored	324	158	343	194
Batting average	19.05	19.75	18.05	21.55
100s/50s	0/2	0/0	0/2	0/0
Top score	72	47	72	47
Balls bowled	54	41	114	41
Wickets	0	1	2	1
Bowling average	–	22.00	19.50	22.00
5 wickets in innings	–	0	0	0
10 wickets in match	–	0	0	0
Best bowling	–	1/5	2/10	1/5
Catches/stumpings	2/–	1/–	3/–	2/–
- Source: CricketArchive, 19 December 2021

Beverly Mary Browne (born 27 March 1957) is a Trinidadian former cricketer who played primarily as a right-handed batter. She appeared in six One Day Internationals (ODIs) for Trinidad and Tobago at the 1973 World Cup, and 11 Test matches and two ODIs for the West Indies between 1976 and 1979. She also played domestic cricket for Trinidad and Tobago.

Her sisters, Louise and Ann, also played international cricket.
