= Charles Joseph =

Charles Joseph may refer to:

- Charles Joseph (musician), jazz trombone player from New Orleans
- Charles Joseph (athlete) (born 1952), retired athlete from Trinidad and Tobago
- Charles Joseph, comte Bresson (1798–1847), French diplomat
- Charles Joseph, comte de Flahaut (1785–1870), French general and statesman
- Charles Joseph of Lorraine (1680–1715), German prelate
- Charles-Joseph, 7th Prince of Ligne (1735–1814), field marshal and writer
- Charles Auguste Marie Joseph, Count of Forbin-Janson (1785–1844), French aristocrat and prelate
- Charles Joseph, 1st Prince of Hohenlohe-Jagstberg (1766–1838), German prince
