= Jill Powell =

English cricketer (born 1957)

Personal information
- Born: 19 January 1957 (age 69); Sheffield, Yorkshire, England
- Batting: Right-handed
- Bowling: Right-arm medium
- Role: Batter
- Relatives: Jane Powell (twin sister)

International information
- National side: England (1979)
- Only Test (cap 87): 1 July 1979 v West Indies
- Only ODI (cap 29): 7 July 1979 v West Indies

Domestic team information
- Years: Team
- 1977–1978: Kent
- 1983/84–1986/87: Western Australia

Career statistics
Competition	WTest	WODI	WFC	WLA
Matches	1	1	19	11
Runs scored	17	2	315	192
Batting average	8.50	2.00	11.25	21.33
100s/50s	0/0	0/0	0/0	0/0
Top score	17	2	48	43
Balls bowled	0	0	144	72
Wickets	–	–	1	7
Bowling average	–	–	71.00	8.57
5 wickets in innings	–	–	0	0
10 wickets in match	–	–	0	0
Best bowling	–	–	1/28	4/38
Catches/stumpings	0/–	0/–	7/–	3/–
- Source: CricketArchive, 27 February 2021

Jill Powell (born 19 January 1957) is an English former cricketer who played as a right-handed batter and right-arm medium bowler. She played one Women's Test match and one One Day International for England in 1979. Her twin sister Jane also represented England. She played domestic cricket for Kent and Western Australia.
