= Ronald Joseph (disambiguation) =

Ronald Joseph may refer to:

- Ronald Joseph (artist) (1910–1992), Kittitian-American artist
- Ronald Joseph (figure skater) (1944–2026), American pair skater
- Ronald Joseph, United States Virgin Islands wrestler in the 1976 Summer Olympics
