= Shirley-Ann Bonaparte =

Trinidadian cricketer (born 1956)

Personal information
- Full name: Shirley-Ann Bonaparte
- Born: 5 February 1956 (age 70); Trinidad
- Batting: Left-handed
- Bowling: Left-arm medium
- Role: All-rounder

International information
- National side: West Indies (1979)
- Test debut (cap 17): 16 June 1979 v England
- Last Test: 1 July 1979 v England
- ODI debut (cap 2): 6 June 1979 v England
- Last ODI: 7 July 1979 v England

Domestic team information
- Years: Team
- 1975/76–1982: Trinidad and Tobago

Career statistics
Competition	WTest	WODI	WFC	WLA
Matches	3	2	6	9
Runs scored	106	7	160	271
Batting average	17.66	3.50	20.00	90.33
100s/50s	0/1	0/0	0/1	0/3
Top score	61	4	61	68*
Balls bowled	24	63	30	141
Wickets	0	0	0	4
Bowling average	–	–	–	14.00
5 wickets in innings	0	0	0	0
10 wickets in match	0	0	0	0
Best bowling	–	–	–	4/5
Catches/stumpings	0/–	0/–	2/–	0/–
- Source: CricketArchive, 16 December 2021

Shirley-Ann Bonaparte (born 5 February 1956) is a Trinidadian former cricketer who played as a left-handed batter and medium pace bowler. She appeared in three Test matches and two One Day Internationals for the West Indies in 1979, with a Test high score of 61.

In the 2nd Test against England at Trent Bridge in 1979, Bonaparte made a fifty off 66 balls and hit the first six by a West Indian woman in Test cricket. Ahead of the 3rd Test at Edgbaston, Bonaparte was described in a television news report as "the best batswoman in the world", and was filmed facing the bowling of England men's fast bowler Bob Willis.

Bonaparte played domestic cricket for Trinidad and Tobago, and later represented the USA, playing her last match in 2009.
