= Vivalyn Latty-Scott =

Jamaican cricketer (1939–2021)

Personal information
- Full name: Vivalyn Latty-Scott
- Born: 1939; Clarendon, Jamaica
- Died: 9 January 2021 (aged 82); Florida, United States
- Batting: Right-handed
- Bowling: Right-arm off break
- Role: All-rounder

International information
- National sides: Jamaica (1973); West Indies (1976–1979)
- Test debut (cap 6): 7 May 1976; West Indies v Australia
- Last Test: 1 July 1979; West Indies v England
- ODI debut (cap 7/13): 30 June 1973; Jamaica v Young England
- Last ODI: 7 July 1979; West Indies v England

Domestic team information
- Years: Team
- 1973–2002: Jamaica

Career statistics
| Competition | WTest | WODI | WFC | WLA |
|---|---|---|---|---|
| Matches | 10 | 6 | 22 | 26 |
| Runs scored | 206 | 173 | 287 | 337 |
| Batting average | 15.84 | 28.83 | 16.88 | 25.92 |
| 100s/50s | 0/1 | 0/2 | 0/1 | 0/3 |
| Top score | 51* | 61 | 51* | 61 |
| Balls bowled | 1,909 | 345 | 2,055 | 872 |
| Wickets | 25 | 5 | 43 | 36 |
| Bowling average | 20.12 | 30.20 | 15.52 | 12.11 |
| 5 wickets in innings | 1 | 0 | 2 | 0 |
| 10 wickets in match | 0 | 0 | 0 | 0 |
| Best bowling | 5/48 | 2/15 | 5/41 | 4/6 |
| Catches/stumpings | 9/– | 2/– | 11/– | 6/– |
- Source: CricketArchive, 18 December 2021

Vivalyn Latty-Scott (née Latty; 1939 – 9 January 2021) was a Jamaican cricketer who played as an all-rounder, batting right-handed and bowling right-arm off break. She appeared in five One Day Internationals for Jamaica at the 1973 World Cup, and ten Test matches and one One Day International for the West Indies between 1976 and 1979. She also played domestic cricket for Jamaica.

== Career ==
She was hailed as the pioneer of women's cricket in the West Indies and was part of the West Indies women team for their inaugural women's Test match against Australia in 1976.

During that Test match, she claimed five wickets for 48 runs in the second innings, becoming the first and only West Indian woman to take a five-wicket haul in Tests. She is also one of thirteen women cricketers to have taken a five-wicket haul on their Test debut.

After her retirement from professional cricket, she pursued a career in coaching and umpiring.

== Death ==
She died on 9 January 2021 at the age of 82 in West Palm Beach Florida, USA.
