= June Bragger =

English cricketer

Personal information
- Full name: June Pamela Bragger
- Born: 2 June 1929; Birmingham, Warwickshire, England
- Died: 27 June 1997 (aged 68); Solihull, Warwickshire, England
- Role: Bowler

International information
- National side: England (1963–1966)
- Test debut (cap 60): 15 June 1963 v Australia
- Last Test: 9 July 1966 v New Zealand

Domestic team information
- Years: Team
- 1949: Lancashire
- 1955–1963: Warwickshire
- 1963: West Midlands

Umpiring information
- WTests umpired: 5 (1976–1987)
- WODIs umpired: 4 (1973–1984)

Career statistics
Competition	WTest	WFC
Matches	5	19
Runs scored	48	183
Batting average	9.60	7.03
100s/50s	0/0	0/0
Top score	12	37
Balls bowled	312	1,740
Wickets	3	28
Bowling average	30.66	21.00
5 wickets in innings	0	0
10 wickets in match	0	0
Best bowling	2/21	4/26
Catches/stumpings	3/–	9/–
- Source: CricketArchive, 6 March 2021

June Bragger (2 June 1929 – 27 June 1997) was an English cricketer who played primarily as a bowler. She appeared in five Test matches for England between 1963 and 1966. She mainly played domestic cricket for Warwickshire, as well as playing matches for Lancashire and West Midlands.
