= Ann McEwen =

West Indian cricketer

Anne-Marie McEwen
Personal information
- Full name: Anne-Marie McEwen
- Born: Trinidad
- Batting: Right-handed
- Bowling: Right-arm medium
- Role: All-rounder

International information
- National side: West Indies (1997)
- ODI debut (cap 30): 11 December 1997 v Sri Lanka
- Last ODI: 20 December 1997 v Denmark

Domestic team information
- Years: Team
- 1996: Trinidad and Tobago

Career statistics
Competition	WODI	WLA
Matches	4	5
Runs scored	14	14
Batting average	4.66	4.66
100s/50s	0/0	0/0
Top score	13	13
Balls bowled	99	99
Wickets	1	6
Bowling average	76.00	16.00
5 wickets in innings	0	1
10 wickets in match	0	0
Best bowling	1/30	5/20
Catches/stumpings	0/–	0/–
- Source: CricketArchive, 28 March 2022

Anne-Marie McEwen is a Trinidadian former cricketer who played as a right-arm medium bowler and right-handed batter. She appeared in four One Day Internationals for the West Indies, all at the 1997 World Cup. She played domestic cricket for Trinidad and Tobago.
