= Nora St. Rose =

Trinidadian cricketer

Personal information
- Full name: Nora St. Rose
- Born: Trinidad
- Batting: Right-handed
- Bowling: Right-arm medium-fast
- Role: Bowler

International information
- National sides: Trinidad and Tobago (1973); West Indies (1976)
- Test debut (cap 13): 14 May 1976; West Indies v Australia
- Last Test: 27 November 1976; West Indies v India
- ODI debut (cap 9): 23 June 1973; Trinidad and Tobago v New Zealand
- Last ODI: 20 July 1973; Trinidad and Tobago v England

Domestic team information
- Years: Team
- 1973–1975/76: Trinidad and Tobago

Career statistics
Competition	WTest	WODI	WFC
Matches	5	6	7
Runs scored	21	2	21
Batting average	5.25	2.00	4.20
100s/50s	0/0	0/0	0/0
Top score	8	2	8
Balls bowled	546	396	654
Wickets	10	8	15
Bowling average	16.00	10.25	11.93
5 wickets in innings	0	0	0
10 wickets in match	0	0	0
Best bowling	3/21	3/16	3/15
Catches/stumpings	0/–	0/–	0/–
- Source: CricketArchive, 17 December 2021

Nora St. Rose is a Trinidadian former cricketer who played as a right-arm medium-fast bowler. She appeared in two One Day Internationals (ODIs) for Trinidad and Tobago at the 1973 World Cup, and five Test matches for the West Indies in 1976. In her ODI debut for Trinidad and Tobago against New Zealand, she had the best bowling figures (2/14) and best economy (1.27) among the nine Trinidadians who bowled in the match. She also played domestic cricket for Trinidad and Tobago.
