= Louise Browne =

West Indian cricketer (born 1952)

Personal information
- Full name: Louise Patricia Browne
- Born: 16 March 1952 (age 74); Trinidad
- Batting: Right-handed
- Role: Batter
- Relatives: Ann Browne (sister); Beverly Browne (sister)

International information
- National sides: Trinidad and Tobago (1973); West Indies (1976–1979)
- Test debut (cap 3): 7 May 1976; West Indies v Australia
- Last Test: 16 June 1979; West Indies v England
- ODI debut (cap 2/4): 23 June 1973; Trinidad and Tobago v New Zealand
- Last ODI: 7 July 1979; West Indies v England

Domestic team information
- Years: Team
- 1973–1989: Trinidad and Tobago

Career statistics
Competition	WTest	WODI	WFC	WLA
Matches	9	8	16	12
Runs scored	348	232	549	261
Batting average	29.00	33.14	28.89	29.00
100s/50s	0/2	0/1	0/4	0/1
Top score	67	50*	67	50*
Catches/stumpings	4/–	1/–	5/–	1/–
- Source: CricketArchive, 19 December 2021

Louise Patricia Browne (born 16 March 1952) is a Trinidadian cricketer who played as a right-handed batter. She appeared in 6 One Day Internationals for Trinidad and Tobago at the 1973 World Cup, and nine Test matches and two One Day Internationals for the West Indies between 1976 and 1979. She captained Trinidad and Tobago at the 1973 World Cup, and captained the West Indies for their first two international series, against Australia and India. She also played domestic cricket for Trinidad and Tobago.

In 2000, Louise was named one of the 100 top sporting personalities of the century in Trinidad and Tobago. In 2011, Louise managed the USA women's cricket team at a World Cup Qualifier in Bangladesh. She was inducted into the Trinidad and Tobago Sports Hall of Fame on November 20, 2015.

Two of her sisters, Beverly and Ann, also played international cricket.
