= Dorothy Hobson =

Jamaican cricketer (born 1946)

Personal information
- Full name: Dorothy Hobson
- Born: 11 November 1946 (age 80); Jamaica
- Batting: Right-handed
- Bowling: Right-arm off break
- Role: Bowler

International information
- National sides: Jamaica (1973); West Indies (1976–1979)
- Test debut (cap 14): 7 November 1976; West Indies v India
- Last Test: 16 June 1979; West Indies v England
- ODI debut (cap 6/9): 30 June 1973; Jamaica v Young England
- Last ODI: 7 July 1979; West Indies v England

Domestic team information
- Years: Team
- 1973–1982: Jamaica

Career statistics
Competition	WTest	WODI	WFC	WLA
Matches	4	7	7	12
Runs scored	26	6	60	23
Batting average	6.50	2.00	12.00	7.66
100s/50s	0/0	0/0	0/0	0/0
Top score	18	6	22*	17*
Balls bowled	474	442	492	609
Wickets	6	7	6	19
Bowling average	20.33	30.14	22.00	13.57
5 wickets in innings	0	0	0	0
10 wickets in match	0	0	0	0
Best bowling	2/22	2/35	2/22	4/7
Catches/stumpings	1/–	0/–	1/–	0/–
- Source: CricketArchive, 17 December 2021

Dorothy Hobson (born 11 November 1946) is a Jamaican former cricketer who played primarily as a right-arm off break bowler. She appeared in five One Day Internationals for Jamaica at the 1973 World Cup, and four Test matches and two One Day Internationals for the West Indies between 1976 and 1979. She also played domestic cricket for Jamaica.

== Career ==
Hobson batted in the middle-order, and bowled right-arm off break. In 1973, she was a member of the Caribbean Women's Cricket Federation, which aimed to make tours more affordable for the countries in the West Indies. Hobson captained the Jamaican team. In 1976, Hobson was included in the first ever West Indies women squad.

Hobson was a coach of the West Indies team at the 1993 Women's Cricket World Cup. In 2013, Hobson became the first ever coach of the Jamaica-based Melbourne Cricket Club's camp. In 2015, Hobson helped relaunch the Jamaica Women's Cricket League, which had not been held for five years. As of 2017, Hobson works as the chief selector for the West Indies women's team, and also the manager of the Melbourne women's cricket team.
