= Jasmine Sammy =

Trinidadian cricketer

Personal information
- Full name: Jasmine Sammy
- Born: Trinidad
- Batting: Right-handed
- Bowling: Right-arm off break
- Role: All-rounder

International information
- National sides: Trinidad and Tobago (1973); West Indies (1976–1979)
- Test debut (cap 8): 7 May 1976; West Indies v Australia
- Last Test: 1 July 1979; West Indies v England
- ODI debut (cap 10/10): 23 June 1973; Trinidad and Tobago v New Zealand
- Last ODI: 6 June 1979; West Indies v England

Domestic team information
- Years: Team
- 1973–1992: Trinidad and Tobago

Career statistics
Competition	WTest	WODI	WFC	WLA
Matches	6	5	9	11
Runs scored	134	46	209	185
Batting average	14.88	9.20	19.00	23.12
100s/50s	0/0	0/0	0/1	0/1
Top score	43	30	50	51*
Balls bowled	168	6	180	6
Wickets	4	0	8	0
Bowling average	9.75	–	8.12	–
5 wickets in innings	0	0	0	0
10 wickets in match	0	0	0	0
Best bowling	3/22	–	4/22	–
Catches/stumpings	2/–	0/–	2/–	0/–
- Source: CricketArchive, 18 December 2021

Jasmine Sammy is a Trinidadian former cricketer who played as an all-rounder, batting right-handed and bowling right-arm off break. She appeared in four One Day Internationals (ODIs) for Trinidad and Tobago at the 1973 World Cup, and six Test matches and one ODI for the West Indies between 1976 and 1979. She also played domestic cricket for Trinidad and Tobago.
