= Patricia Whittaker =

Barbadian cricketer

Personal information
- Full name: Patricia Whittaker
- Born: Barbados
- Batting: Right-handed
- Bowling: Right-arm medium-fast
- Role: All-rounder

International information
- National side: West Indies (1976–1979)
- Test debut (cap 10): 7 May 1976 v Australia
- Last Test: 1 July 1979 v England
- Only ODI (cap 14): 7 July 1979 v England

Domestic team information
- Years: Team
- 1975/76–1977: Barbados

Career statistics
Competition	WTest	WODI	WFC	WLA
Matches	11	1	15	2
Runs scored	472	40	585	40
Batting average	27.76	–	30.78	–
100s/50s	0/4	0/0	0/6	0/0
Top score	65	40*	65	40*
Balls bowled	1,260	60	1,474	60
Wickets	25	3	32	3
Bowling average	19.36	12.00	16.31	12.00
5 wickets in innings	0	0	0	0
10 wickets in match	0	0	0	0
Best bowling	4/22	3/36	4/13	3/36
Catches/stumpings	5/–	0/–	6/–	0/–
- Source: CricketArchive, 18 December 2021

Patricia Whittaker is a Barbadian former cricketer who played as an all-rounder, batting right-handed and bowling right-arm medium-fast. She appeared in 11 Test matches and one One Day International for the West Indies between 1976 and 1979, including captaining the side in four matches. She scored four Test half-centuries and scored 472 runs in all (an average of almost 28 runs per innings) and claimed 25 wickets at an average of under 20. She played domestic cricket for Barbados.
