= Patricia Alfred =

West Indian cricketer

Personal information
- Full name: Patricia Alfred
- Born: Trinidad
- Batting: Right-handed
- Bowling: Right-arm medium-fast
- Role: Bowler

International information
- National side: West Indies (1979)
- Only Test (cap 16): 16 June 1979 v England
- Only ODI (cap 12): 7 July 1979 v England

Career statistics
Competition	WTest	WODI
Matches	1	1
Runs scored	1	1
Batting average	–	–
100s/50s	0/0	0/0
Top score	1*	1*
Balls bowled	98	66
Wickets	0	1
Bowling average	–	34.00
5 wickets in innings	0	0
10 wickets in match	0	0
Best bowling	–	1/34
Catches/stumpings	0/–	0/–
- Source: CricketArchive, 16 December 2021

Patricia Alfred is a Trinidadian former cricketer who played as a right-arm medium-fast bowler. She appeared in one Test match and one One Day International for the West Indies in 1979.
