= Merlyn Edwards =

Trinidadian cricketer

Personal information
- Full name: Merlyn Edwards
- Batting: Left-handed
- Role: Wicket-keeper

International information
- National sides: Trinidad and Tobago (1973); West Indies (1979)
- Test debut (cap 18): 23 June 1979; West Indies v England
- Last Test: 1 July 1979; West Indies v England
- ODI debut (cap 13/5): 30 June 1973; Trinidad and Tobago v Australia
- Last ODI: 7 July 1979; West Indies v England

Domestic team information
- Years: Team
- 1973–1994: Trinidad and Tobago

Career statistics
Competition	WTest	WODI	WFC	WLA
Matches	2	6	5	11
Runs scored	60	23	78	151
Batting average	15.00	3.83	13.00	16.77
100s/50s	0/0	0/0	0/0	0/1
Top score	23	9	23	65*
Catches/stumpings	1/–	2/0	2/1	4/1
- Source: CricketArchive, 16 December 2021

Merlyn Edwards is a Trinidadian former cricketer who played as a wicket-keeper and left-handed batter. She appeared in four One Day Internationals for Trinidad and Tobago at the 1973 World Cup, and two Test matches and two One Day Internationals for the West Indies in 1979. She also played domestic cricket for Trinidad and Tobago.
