= University of Maine Museum of Art =

Coordinates: 44°48′09″N 68°46′14″W

Zillman Art Museum -University of Maine (formerly the University of Maine Museum of Art)
- Former name: University of Maine Art Collection
- Established: 1946
- Location: Bangor, Maine, United States
- Type: Art museum
- Director: George Kinghorn
- Curator: George Kinghorn
- Architect: Ann Beha Architects
- Public transit access: UMaine Memorial Union, BAT Community Connector
- Website: zam.umaine.edu

Zillman Art Museum-University of Maine (ZAM) is an art museum in downtown Bangor, Maine. It is part of the University of Maine, which is located in nearby Orono, Maine. The University of Maine Art Collection was established in 1946, under the leadership of Vincent Hartgen. As the initial faculty member of the Department of Art and curator of the art collection, Hartgen's goal was to provide the people of Maine with significant opportunities to experience and learn about the visual arts and their diverse histories and cultural meanings.

In the early 1980s, the University Art Collection became the University of Maine Museum of Art. Through the cooperative effort and vision of the City of Bangor and the University of Maine, the museum relocated in December 2002 to downtown Bangor where it has taken on a new role as a regional fine arts center. The facility was designed by the Boston firm, Ann Beha Architects, and now occupies the first floor of Norumbega Hall, a historic downtown building that formerly housed a department store. The Bangor facility, while allowing the museum to showcase a greater proportion of its collection, also enhances the arts scene of the region's largest city.

The museum remains the only institution owned by the citizens of the State of Maine to house a permanent fine arts collection – one which has grown to a stature that makes it a nucleus in the state for historic and contemporary art. Consisting of more than 5500 original works of art, the collection is particularly strong in American mid-20th century works on paper. Contemporary highlights of the collection include works by David Hockney, Andy Warhol, Roy Lichtenstein, Edward Hopper, Knox Martin, Pablo Picasso, and Edward Burtynsky. Additionally, the museum's permanent collection includes work by artists associated with Maine such as Berenice Abbott, Marsden Hartley, Winslow Homer, John Marin, Carl Sprinchorn, and Andrew Wyeth. In addition to making the University's collection more accessible to the public, the downtown location enables the museum to expand its educational programs beyond the confines of the Orono campus. In 2011, the museum was said to have one of the finest gallery spaces in the state.

The museum hosts an annual calendar of exhibitions featuring contemporary artists and ideas. In 2011, the museum hosted its first national show, Photo National 2011. The exhibit featured 76 photographs by 34 photographers, including 11 from Maine. Among the museum's educational offerings are art camps for children lectures, special events, family programming, and educational classes and workshops for adults.

The Zillman is part of the Maine Art Museum Trail, a circuit of eight art museums designed to highlight Maine's art history.

In 2014, the museum renewed its lease to remain in the downtown location for an additional 17 years.
