= Jamaica women's national cricket team =

Jamaica
- Flag of Jamaica

Personnel
- Captain: Stafanie Taylor
- Coach: Shane Brooks

Team information
- Founded: First recorded match: 1967
- Home ground: Kensington Park, Kingston

History
- First-class debut: Trinidad and Tobago in 1975 at Queen's Park Oval, Port of Spain
- S50 wins: 6
- T20 Blaze wins: 4

One Day Internationals
- First ODI: v Young England at Gore Court, Sittingbourne; 30 June 1973
- Last ODI: v International XI at Leicester Ivanhoe Cricket Club Ground, Kirby Muxloe; 14 July 1973
ODIs	Played	Won/Lost
Total	5	1/4 (0 ties, 0 no result)
- World Cup appearances: 1 (first in 1973)
- Best result: 6th (1973)
- As of 3 January 2019

The Jamaica women's national cricket team is the women's representative cricket team of the country of Jamaica in the Caribbean. They compete in the Women's Super50 Cup and the Twenty20 Blaze competitions organised by Cricket West Indies.

In 1973, they competed in the first World Cup, finishing sixth with one win. Since, the West Indies have competed as a united team, and Jamaica have only competed at domestic level.

== History ==
Jamaica's first recorded match took place in 1967, and in their early history they played often against Trinidad, as well against a touring England side.

In 1973, Jamaica competed in the inaugural World Cup. The side finished sixth in the group of seven, with one win, one no result and four losses. Their one victory came against Young England, helped by 61 from Vivalyn Latty-Scott and 4/9 from 6 overs from Madge Stewart.

The West Indies domestic system began in the 1975–76 season, with Jamaica competing in the Caribbean Women's Cricket Federation Championships. The full results and standings are not recorded, but Jamaica recorded one victory, by an innings and 29 runs against Grenada. The following season, 1977, Jamaica became the first recorded winners of a West Indian domestic competition, topping the Federation Championship table, with three drawn matches won on first innings score.

Jamaica are recorded as finishing runners-up in the premier domestic competition three more times over the next 20 years, in 1989, 1990 and 1992. Jamaica won their second title in 1999, beating Saint Lucia in the final of the knockout section of the Federation Championships by 4 wickets, helped by 93 from Marlene Needham.

Jamaica's most successful era came between 2011 and 2014, where they won five titles. They won the 50-over competition, now named the Regional Women's Championship, three times in a row, in 2011, 2013 and 2014, beating Trinidad and Tobago in the final in the first two years and beating Guyana in the final in 2014. Jamaica also won the first two T20 competitions in 2012 and 2013, beating Trinidad and Tobago in the final in 2012, with their captain Stafanie Taylor being named Player of the Tournament, and beating Barbados in the final in 2013.

Between 2015 and 2019, Jamaica finished as runners-up four times: in 2015 in the 50-over competition, and in three consecutive T20 competitions, losing one final and finishing runners-up in the league stage twice more. After the 2020 and 2021 season were cancelled due to the COVID-19 pandemic, Jamaica won the 2022 Twenty20 Blaze, edging out Barbados on Net Run Rate. They reached the final of the 2022 Women's Super50 Cup, but lost to Barbados. In 2023, they finished fourth in both competitions. They won both the Super50 Cup and Twenty20 Blaze in 2024.

== Players ==
=== Current squad ===
Based on squad announced for the 2023 season. Players in bold have international caps.

Name	Nationality	Birth date	Batting style	Bowling style	Notes
Batters
Keneshia Ferron	West Indies	Unknown	Left-handed	Unknown	
Shereka Shelton	West Indies	Unknown	Unknown	Unknown	
**Kate Wilmott**	West Indies	Unknown	Unknown	Unknown	
All-rounders
Sherene Burnett	West Indies	Unknown	Unknown	Unknown	
**Chinelle Henry**	West Indies	17 August 1985 (age 40)	Right-handed	Right-arm medium	
**Chedean Nation**	West Indies	31 October 1986 (age 39)	Right-handed	Right-arm medium	
**Stafanie Taylor**	West Indies	11 June 1991 (age 34)	Right-handed	Right-arm off break	Captain
Wicket-keepers
**Natasha McLean**	West Indies	22 December 1994 (age 31)	Right-handed	Right-arm medium	
Lena Scott	West Indies	1 November 2003 (age 22)	Right-handed	–	
**Rashada Williams**	West Indies	23 February 1997 (age 29)	Right-handed	Unknown	
Bowlers
Jody-Ann Brown	West Indies	Unknown	Right-handed	Slow left-arm orthodox	
Nicole Campbell	West Indies	30 December 2000 (age 24)	Right-handed	Slow left-arm orthodox	
**Vanessa Watts**	West Indies	11 August 1987 (age 38)	Right-handed	Right-arm off break	
Neisha-Ann Waisome	West Indies	29 June 1993 (age 32)	Right-handed	Right-arm medium	
Celina Whyte	West Indies	Unknown	Right-handed	Right-arm medium	

=== Notable players ===
Players who have played for Jamaica and played internationally are listed below, in order of first international appearance (given in brackets). Players listed with a Jamaica flag appeared for the side at the 1973 World Cup, which carried One Day International status:

- (Jamaica) Paulette Lynch (Note: Lynch played international cricket for International XI.) (1973)
- (Jamaica) Evelyn Bogle (1973)
- (Jamaica) Dorrett Davis (1973)
- (Jamaica) Elaine Emmanual (1973)
- (Jamaica) (Cricket West Indies) Peggy Fairweather (1973)
- (Jamaica) (Cricket West Indies) Yolande Geddes-Hall (1973)
- (Jamaica) (Cricket West Indies) Dorothy Hobson (1973)
- (Jamaica) (Cricket West Indies) Vivalyn Latty-Scott (1973)
- (Jamaica) Loretta McIntosh (1973)
- (Jamaica) Yvonne Oldfield (1973)
- (Jamaica) Madge Stewart (1973)
- (Jamaica) (Cricket West Indies) Grace Williams (1973)
- (Jamaica) Audrey McInnis (1973)
- (Jamaica) Hyacinth Fleming (1973)
- (Cricket West Indies) Marlene Needham (1993)
- (Cricket West Indies) Jacqueline Robinson (1993)
- (Cricket West Indies) Rita Scott (1993)
- (Cricket West Indies) Jennifer Sterling (1993)
- (Cricket West Indies) Elaine Cunningham (1993)
- (Cricket West Indies) Lorna McKoy (1997)
- (Cricket West Indies) Chedean Nation (2008)
- (Cricket West Indies) Stafanie Taylor (2008)
- (Cricket West Indies) Shanel Daley (2008)
- (Cricket West Indies) Natasha McLean (2012)
- (Cricket West Indies) Chinelle Henry (2013)
- (Cricket West Indies) Vanessa Watts (2014)
- (Cricket West Indies) Rashada Williams (2021)
- (Cricket West Indies) Kate Wilmott (2024)

== Honours ==
- Women's Super50 Cup:
  - Winners (6): 1977, 1999, 2011, 2013, 2014, 2024
- Twenty20 Blaze:
  - Winners (4): 2012, 2013, 2022, 2024

== Records ==
=== One-Day Internationals ===
- Highest team total: 162/8 vs International XI, 14 July 1973.
- Highest individual score: 61, Vivalyn Latty-Scott vs Young England, 30 June 1973.
- Best innings bowling: 4/9, Madge Stewart vs Young England, 30 June 1973.

Most ODI runs for Jamaica Women
Player	Runs	Average	Career span
Vivalyn Latty-Scott	168	33.60	1973
Grace Williams	108	21.60	1973
Evelyn Bogle	77	15.40	1973
Peggy Fairweather	70	14.00	1973
Yolande Geddes-Hall	70	23.33	1973

Most ODI wickets for Jamaica Women
Player	Wickets	Average	Career span
Grace Williams	7	16.57	1973
Madge Stewart	5	8.80	1973
Peggy Fairweather	5	22.00	1973
Vivalyn Latty-Scott	5	26.20	1973
Evelyn Bogle	4	33.00	1973
Dorothy Hobson	4	36.50	1973

ODI record versus other nations
Opponent	M	W	L	T	NR	First	Last
Australia	1	0	1	0	0	1973	1973
England	1	0	1	0	0	1973	1973
International XI	1	0	1	0	0	1973	1973
New Zealand	1	0	0	0	1	1973	1973
Trinidad and Tobago	1	0	1	0	0	1973	1973
Young England	1	1	0	0	0	1973	1973
Total	6	1	4	0	1	1973	1973

== See also ==
- List of Jamaica women ODI cricketers
- Jamaica national cricket team
