= Madge Stewart =

Jamaican cricketer

International information
- National side: Jamaica (1973)
- ODI debut (cap 9): 30 June 1973 v Young England
- Last ODI: 11 July 1973 v Australia

Career statistics
Competition	WODI
Matches	4
Runs scored	1
Batting average	0.50
100s/50s	0/0
Top score	1
Balls bowled	84
Wickets	5
Bowling average	8.80
5 wickets in innings	0
10 wickets in match	0
Best bowling	4/9
Catches/stumpings	0/0
- Source: Cricinfo, 10 December 2017

Madge Stewart is a former Jamaican woman cricketer. Madge Stewart made her international debut for Jamaica in 1973 at the 1973 Women's Cricket World Cup. In a match as a part of the 1973 Women's Cricket World Cup, she delivered a memorable spell of 4/9 against Young England women's cricket team which helped Jamaica to win that match by 23 runs.

Her international career was halted in 1973 with playing for Jamaica in 4 WODIs.
