= Grace Williams (cricketer) =

Jamaican cricketer (born 1947)

Leila Grace Williams
Personal information
- Full name: Leila Grace Williams Alston
- Born: March 1947 (age 79); Jamaica
- Batting: Right-handed
- Bowling: Right-arm medium-fast
- Role: All-rounder

International information
- National sides: Jamaica (1973); West Indies (1976–1979)
- Test debut (cap 11): 7 May 1976; West Indies v Australia
- Last Test: 1 July 1979; West Indies v England
- ODI debut (cap 11/11): 30 June 1973; Jamaica v Young England
- Last ODI: 6 June 1979; West Indies v England

Domestic team information
- Years: Team
- 1973–1975/76: Jamaica

Career statistics
Competition	WTest	WODI	WFC	WLA
Matches	11	6	14	7
Runs scored	293	122	339	164
Batting average	20.92	20.33	21.18	23.42
100s/50s	0/2	0/0	0/2	0/0
Top score	63	40	63	42
Balls bowled	965	394	1,079	394
Wickets	15	7	21	7
Bowling average	27.20	20.42	20.42	20.42
5 wickets in innings	0	0	0	0
10 wickets in match	0	0	0	0
Best bowling	4/30	4/11	4/8	4/11
Catches/stumpings	7/–	1/–	10/–	1/–
- Source: CricketArchive, 17 December 2021

Leila Grace Williams is a Jamaican former cricketer who played primarily as an all-rounder, batting right-handed and bowling right-arm medium-fast. She appeared in five One Day Internationals for Jamaica at the 1973 World Cup, and eleven Test matches and one One Day International for the West Indies between 1976 and 1979. She also played domestic cricket for Jamaica.
