= Sharma =

Surname in India and Nepal

Sharma‌ is a Hindu Brahmin surname. ‌The Sanskrit stem‌ ṣárman- (nom. sarma) ‌can ‌mean '‌joyfulness', 'comfort‌', 'happiness'. Sarma and Sarmah are alternative English spellings of the name, commonly used by Assamese Brahmins.

== Origin ==
According to the Bhavishya Purana, ‌Sharma is the‌ first ‌Brahmin surname‌, which Parashurama, the sixth avatar of Vishnu, is ‌said to have given ‌to King Jaisen.

== Etymology‌ ==
‌The Sanskrit‌ word "Sharma‌" is derived‌ from ‌the term "ṣárman‌," which ‌carries meanings of 'joy,' 'comfort,' and 'happiness.'

== People ==
Notable people with the surname Sharma, Sarma or Sarmah who may or may not belong to Brahmin caste are as follows:

=== A ===
- Abhiram Sharma, Nepalese politician
- Abhishek Sharma (disambiguation), several people
- Adah Sharma, Indian actress
- Aditi Sharma (actress, born 1983), Indian film and TV actress
- Aditi Sharma (actress, born 1996), Indian TV actress
- Aditi Sharma (cricketer), Indian cricketer
- Agni Sharma (Valmiki), Indian author
- Aham Sharma, Indian film and TV actor
- Ajay Sharma (1988–1993), Indian cricketer
- Akki Sharma, Nepalese visual effect artist
- Alok Sharma, British politician
- Alok Sharma (cricketer), Indian cricketer
- Amit Prakash Sharma, Indian parasitologist
- Amit Sharma (cricketer), Indian cricketer
- Anand Sharma, Indian politician
- Anant Sharma (1919–1988), Indian railway union leader and politician
- Anil Sharma, several people
- Anjali Sharma (climate activist), Australian environmentalist
- Anjani Kumar Sharma, Nepalese surgeon
- Ankit Sharma (athlete), Indian athlete
- Ankit Sharma (cricketer), Indian cricketer
- Ankit Sharma (footballer), Indian footballer
- Ankitta Sharma, Indian actress
- Anna Sharma, (born 1995) Nepalese actress
- Anthony Francis Sharma, Nepalese Jesuit
- Anup Raj Sharma, Chief Justice of Nepal
- Anu Sharma, American audiologist and academic
- Anuj Sharma (singer), Indian playback singer
- Anuj Sharma (actor) (born 1976), Indian politician and actor
- Anuj Sharma (police officer) (born 1968), Indian policeman
- Anushka Sharma (born 1988), Indian film actress and producer
- Archana Sharma (botanist) (1932–2008), Indian cytogeneticist and cytotoxicologist
- Aribam Syam Sharma, Indian film director and composer
- Arun Kumar Sarmah, Indian politician
- Arun Kumar Sharma, Indian biologist
- Arjun Sharma, Indian cricketer
- Arvind Sharma (born 1940), Indian academic
- Ashish Sharma, Indian actor
- Astra Sharma, Australian tennis player
- Avinash Sharma (born 1981), New Zealand cricketer

=== B ===
- B. D. Sharma (1918–1993), Indian politician from Odisha and Madhya Pradesh
- B. N. Sarma (1867–1932), Indian lawyer, politician and freedom fighter
- Babita Sharma, British television newsreader
- Basanti Sarma, Indian politician
- Benudhar Sharma, Indian historian
- Bhagwatikumar Sharma (1934–2018), Indian author and journalist
- Bhakti Sharma, Indian swimmer
- Brajanath Sarma, Assamese playwright and actor
- Bipul Sharma, Indian cricketer

=== C ===
- Charu Sharma, Indian cricket commentator
- Charu Sharma (athlete) (born 1992), Indian athlete and performer
- Chetan Sharma, Indian cricketer, politician, nephew of Yashpal
- Chris Sharma, American rock climber
- Cindy Devika Sharma, Trinidad and Tobago politician

=== D ===
- Dave Sharma, Australian politician
- Debeswar Sarmah (1896–1993), Indian politician
- Deepak Sharma (disambiguation), several people
- Deepti Sharma (born 1997), Indian cricketer
- Deen Bandhu Sharma, Indian writer from Jammu and Kashmir
- Devyani Sharma, Sociolinguistics professor
- Dheeraj Sharma (filmmaker), Indian film director and social worker
- Dheeraj Sharma (professor), Indian professor of management
- Dina Nath Sharma, Nepalese politician
- Dinesh Sharma (actor), Nepalese actor
- Dinesh Sharma (politician), Indian politician from Lucknow
- Dinesh Sharma (academic), Indian social scientist, psychologist, academic and author
- Dineshwar Sharma (1954–2020), Indian police officer
- Dipannita Sharma (born 1979), Indian model and actress
- Diplu Ranjan Sarmah, Indian politician
- Divyendu Sharma (born 1983), known as Divyenndu, Indian actor
- Dwijen Sharma, Bangladeshi naturalist and science writer

=== E ===
- Evelyn Sharma (born 1986), German actress

=== G ===
- Geetanjali Sharma (born 1984), Indian classical dancer
- Gaurav Sharma (engineer), American engineer
- Gaurav Sharma (politician), (born 1987), New Zealand doctor and politician
- Gaurav Sharma (singer) (born 1992), Indian singer and composer
- Girish Sharma, Indian comedian
- G. R. Sharma (1919–1986), Indian historian
- Gokul Sharma (born 1985), Indian cricketer
- Gopal Sharma (disambiguation), multiple people
- Gyanesh Sharma (born 1963), Indian politician

=== H ===
- Hariharan Raja Sharma, Indian politician
- Himanshu Sharma, Indian screenwriter
- Himanta Biswa Sarma, Indian politician from Assam

=== I ===
- Ishant Sharma (born 1988), Indian cricketer

=== J ===
- Janamanchi Seshadri Sarma, Indian Telugu poet
- Jagdish Sharma, Indian politician
- Janardhan Sharma, Nepalese politician
- Jaswant Rai Sharma, known as Naqsh Lyallpuri, Indian lyricist
- Jaya Sharma, Indian cricketer
- Jhabarmal Sharma, Indian journalist and historian of Rajasthan
- Jitesh Sharma (born 1993), Indian cricketer
- Joginder Sharma, Indian cricketer
- Jyotirmaya Sharma, Indian political scientist

=== K ===
- K. V. Sarma, Indian science historian
- Kamalesh Sharma, Indian diplomat and Secretary-General of the Commonwealth
- Kapil Sharma (comedian) (born 1981), Indian comedian, actor, TV host and producer
- Karan Sharma (disambiguation), several people
- Karanvir Sharma, Indian actor
- Karn Sharma, Indian cricketer
- Karthik Sarma (born 1974/1975), Indian-American billionaire hedge fund manager
- Kavana Sarma, Indian engineer
- Khadga Prasad Sharma Oli, Prime Minister of Nepal
- Kidar Sharma (1910–1999), Indian film director, producer, screenwriter, and lyricist
- Kim Sharma, Indian actress and model
- Konkona Sen Sharma (born 1979), Indian actress
- Krishna Nath Sarmah (1887–1947), Indian nationalist
- Kriti Sharma, Indian artificial intelligence technologist
- Kuldeep Sharma (politician), Indian politician from Haryana
- Kum Uma Sharma (born 1942), Indian kathak dancer, choreographer, and teacher

=== L ===
- Lalit Mohan Sharma (1928–2008), Chief Justice of India
- Laxmi Sharma, Nepali entrepreneur

=== M ===
- Mahesh Sharma (born 1959), Indian politician
- Mahika Sharma (born 1994), Indian actress and model
- Mamta Sharma, Indian singer, Munni Badnaam Hui
- Malvika Sharma (born 1999), Indian actress and model
- Manish Sharma (disambiguation), several people
- Manju Sharma (biologist) (born 1940), Indian biologist from Gandhinagar
- Manu Sharma (born 1977), Indian convicted for the 1999 murder of Jessica Lal
- Mithila Sharma, Nepalese actress
- Mohit Sharma, Indian cricketer
- Mohit Sharma, Indian military officer
- Mukesh Sharma, Indian auditor
- Murari Raj Sharma, Nepalese diplomat
- Murli Sharma, Indian actor

=== N ===
- Neha Sharma (born 1987), Indian actress and model
- Nia Sharma (born 1990), Indian actress
- Nikita Sharma, Indian actress
- Nilamber Dev Sharma, Indian scholar and writer of Dogri and English literature
- Nisha Sharma, Nepalese actor
- Nisha Sharma, Indian field hockey player
- Nisha Sharma, American romance novelist
- Nupur Sharma, Indian politician

=== P ===
- Pankaj Sharma, British neurologist
- Paras Sharma, Indian cricketer
- Paridhi Sharma, Indian actress
- Parvez Sharma, Indian writer and filmmaker
- Phaldut Sharma, British actor and dancer
- Phani Sarma, Assamese playwright and actor
- Pooja Sharma (disambiguation)
- Palki Sharma, Indian Journalist
- Prabin Chandra Sarma, Indian politician

=== R ===
- R. S. Sharma (disambiguation), multiple people
- Rabindra Nath Sharma, Nepalese politician
- Rahul Sharma (disambiguation), several people
- Rajan Sarma, Tamil-language actor
- Rajat Sharma (born 1957), Indian Hindi TV news channel editor
- Rajendra Prasad Sharma (born 1960), IPS, DGP officer, Orissa Police
- Rajesh Kumar Sharma (born 1978), Bihar Politician, Health Minister
- Rajesh Sharma (disambiguation), several people
- Rajiv Sharma, New Zealand cricketer
- Rakesh Sharma (born 1949), Indian Air Force pilot who flew aboard Soyuz T-11
- Ram Avatar Sharma, Indian Sanskrit scholar
- Ram Karan Sharma, Indian Sanskrit poet
- Ram Prasad Sharma, Indian politician
- Ram Sharan Sharma, Indian historian
- Ram Vilas Sharma (1912–2000), Indian literary critic, linguist, and poet
- Reecha Sharma, Nepalese actress
- Rhea Sharma, Indian Television actress
- Ria Sharma (born 1980), Indian entrepreneur in British Columbia.
- Richa Sharma (disambiguation), several people
- Riniki Bhuyan Sarma, Indian lawyer, entrepreneur and social activist.
- Robin Sharma (born 1965), Canadian writer, leadership speaker
- Rohit Sharma (born 1987), Indian cricketer
- Roopam Sharma (born 1995), Indian Scientist and Inventor
- Rupak Sarmah (fl. 2016–2021), Indian politician
- Rupam Sarmah, Indian musician

=== S ===
- S. Sharma, communist leader
- Sagar Sharma, Indian cricketer
- Sahil Sharma, Indian cricketer
- Sameer Sharma, Indian television actor
- Sankar Das Sarma, American scientist
- Sandeep Sharma (born 1993), Indian cricketer, playing domestic cricket for Punjab
- Sanjay Sarma, Indian professor of mechanical engineering and the Vice-President for Open Learning at MIT
- Sanjay Sharma, (born 1967) Canadian ophthalmologist
- Sanjay Sharma (born 1969) Indian politician as of 2024, a Minister of State in the Government of Rajasthan
- Sanjay Sharma (born 1969) Indian serial killer who murdered 2 of his wives and a child
- Sanjeev Sharma (1988–1990), Indian cricketer
- Sanu Sharma, Australian writer of Nepalese nationality
- Satish Kumar Sharma, Indian National Congress party politician, MP representing Madhya Pradesh in the Rajya Sabha
- Satish Sharma (1947–2021), Indian National Congress party politician, and member of the Union Cabinet
- Satnarine Sharma, former Chief Justice of Trinidad and Tobago
- Shankar Dayal Sharma (1918–1999), ninth President of India
- Shefali Sharma, Indian TV actress
- Shivkumar Sharma (born 1939), Indian Santoor player
- Shreya Sharma, Indian child film actress
- Shrikant Sharma, politician from Mathura
- Sree Harilal Sarma, Indian Navy Admiral
- Shubhlakshmi Sharma, Indian cricketer
- Shyam Sunder Sharma, 7-times MLA from Mant
- Sidharth Sarmah (born 1998), Indian cricketer
- Subbaraya Sharma, Indian Telugu theatre, television and movie artist
- Sudheer Sharma, Nepalese journalist
- Sunil Kumar Sharma (disambiguation), multiple people
- Suresh Raj Sharma, Nepalese academic
- Surendra Nath Sharma (1910–1987), known as Surendra, Indian singer-actor of Hindi films

=== T ===
- Tara Sharma, Hindi-language film actress
- Tara Nath Sharma, Nepalese writer
- Tarali Sarma, Indian singer
- Tanya Sharma, Indian TV actress
- Tilak Ram Sharma (born 1968), Nepali politician
- Tunisha Sharma, Indian TV actress

=== U ===
- Umang Sharma (born 1989), Indian cricketer playing for Uttar Pradesh
- Umesh Sharma, Indian politician and member of the Bharatiya Janata Party
- Urvashi Sharma, Indian actress
- Upendranath Sharma (1910–1996), pen name Upendranath Ashk, Indian poet
- Utkarsh Sharma, Indian actor

=== V ===
- Venod Sharma (born 1948), Indian politician, founder of the Haryana Jan Chetna Party (V)
- Vinod Prakash Sharma (1938–2015), Indian malariologist
- Vineet Kumar Sharma, Indian field hockey player
- Virendra Sharma, British Politician
- Vishal Sharma (disambiguation), several people
- Vishnu Sharma, author of Panchtantra
- Vishwa Nath Sharma (born 1930), Indian Chief of the Army Staff
- Vivek Sharma, born 1969, Indian filmmaker
- Vivekanand Sharma (1938–2006), Fiji Indian politician and religious worker

=== Y ===
- Yashpal Sharma (actor) (born 1967), Indian actor
- Yashpal Sharma (cricketer) (1954–2021), Indian cricketer
- Yuyutsu Sharma, Nepalese writer

=== Z ===
- Zoii Nath Sarmah (fl. 1991–2016), Indian politician
