= List of Padma Bhushan award recipients (1980–1989) =

List of recipients of a civilian award in India

Padma Bhushan
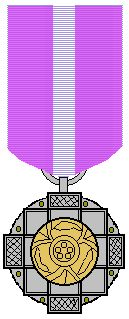
- Type: National Civilian
- Country: India
- Presented by: Government of India
- Ribbon
- Obverse: A centrally located lotus flower is embossed and the text "Padma" written in Devanagari script is placed above and the text "Bhushan" is placed below the lotus.
- Reverse: A platinum State Emblem of India placed in the centre with the national motto of India, "Satyameva Jayate" (Truth alone triumphs) in Devanagari Script
- Established: 1954
- First award: 1954

Highlights
- Total: 133
- Website: http://www.padmaawards.gov.in/

Precedence
- Next (higher): Padma Vibhushan

- Next (lower): Padma Shri

The Padma Bhushan is the third-highest civilian award of the Republic of India. Instituted on 2 January 1954, the award is given for "distinguished service of a high order", without distinction of race, occupation, position, or sex. The recipients receive a Sanad, a certificate signed by the President of India and a circular-shaped medallion with no monetary association. The recipients are announced every year on Republic Day (26 January) and registered in The Gazette of India—a publication used for official government notices and released weekly by the Department of Publication, under the Ministry of Urban Development. The conferral of the award is not considered official without its publication in the Gazette. The name of recipient, whose award have been revoked or restored, both of which require the authority of the President, is archived and they are required to surrender their medal when their name is struck from the register; none of the conferments of Padma Bhushan during 1980–1989 have been revoked or restored. The recommendations are received from all the state and the union territory governments, as well as from Ministries of the Government of India, the Bharat Ratna and the Padma Vibhushan awardees, the Institutes of Excellence, the Ministers, the Chief Ministers and the Governors of State, and the Members of Parliament including private individuals.

When instituted in 1954, the Padma Bhushan was classified as "Dusra Varg" (Class II) under the three-tier Padma Vibhushan awards, which were preceded by the Bharat Ratna in hierarchy. On 15 January 1955, the Padma Vibhushan was reclassified into three different awards as the Padma Vibhushan, the Padma Bhushan and the Padma Shri. The criteria included "distinguished service of a high order in any field including service rendered by Government servants", but excluded those working with the public sector undertakings with the exception of doctors and scientists. The 1954 statutes did not allow posthumous awards; this was subsequently modified in the January 1955 statute. The design was also changed to the form that is currently in use; it portrays a circular-shaped toned bronze medallion 1 3/4 inches (44 mm) in diameter and 1/8 inch (3.2 mm) thick. The centrally placed pattern made of outer lines of a square of 1 3/16 inches (30 mm) side is embossed with a knob carved within each of the outer angles of the pattern. A raised circular space of diameter 1 1/16 inches (27 mm) is placed at the centre of the decoration. A centrally located lotus flower is embossed on the obverse side of the medal and the text "Padma" is placed above and the text "Bhushan" is placed below the lotus written in Devanagari script. The State Emblem of India is displayed in the centre of the reverse side, together with the national motto of India, "Satyameva Jayate" (Truth alone triumphs) in Devanagari script, which is inscribed on the lower edge. The rim, the edges and all embossing on either side is of standard gold with the text "Padma Bhushan" of gold gilt. The medal is suspended by a pink riband 1 1/4 inches (32 mm) in width with a broad white stripe in the middle. It is ranked fifth in the order of precedence of wearing of medals and decorations of the Indian civilian and military awards. (Note: The order of precedence is: Bharat Ratna, Param Vir Chakra, Ashoka Chakra, Padma Vibhushan and Padma Bhushan.)

After assuming office as Prime Minister of India in 1977, Morarji Desai withdrew all the civilian awards, reckoning them as "worthless and politicized". As a result, the Padma Bhushan award was not conferred to any person from 1978 until 1980 when the suspension was rescinded on 25 January by Indira Gandhi, Desai's predecessor who had returned to office. Cricketer Sunil Gavaskar became the first recipient of the award since its restoration in 1980; he was the only person awarded in that year.

A total of 134 awards were presented in the 1980s. Only one award was conferred in 1980 which was later followed by nine in 1981, fifteen in 1982, seventeen in 1983, eighteen in 1984, twenty-one in 1985, fourteen in 1986, twelve in 1987, thirteen in 1988, and fourteen in 1989. The Padma Bhushan in the 1980s was also conferred upon ten foreign recipients – four from the United Kingdom, three from the United States, and one each from Denmark, France, and Japan. Individuals from nine different fields were awarded, which includes twenty-eight from literature and education, twenty-five from civil services, twenty-three artists, twenty from science and engineering, thirteen from medicine, ten from public affairs, eight from social work, four from trade and industry, and three from sportspersons. Pushpa Mittra Bhargava, scientist and founder-director of Centre for Cellular and Molecular Biology (CCMB) who had received the award in 1986 in the field of medicine, returned it in 2015 in protest of the Dadri mob lynching and out of concern at the "prevailing socio-politico situation" in the country.

== Recipients ==
Award recipients by year
Year	Number of recipients
1980	1
1981	9
1982	15
1983	17
1984	18
1985	21
1986	14
1987	12
1988	13
1989	14

Award recipients by field
Field	Number of recipients
Arts	23
Civil Service	25
Literature & Education	28
Medicine	13
Public Affairs	10
Science & Engineering	20
Social Work	8
Sports	3
Trade & Industry	4

Key
# Indicates a posthumous honour

List of Padma Bhushan award recipients, showing the year, field, and state/country
Year	Portrait	Laureates	Field	State
1980		Sunil Gavaskar	Sports	Maharashtra
1981		Vainu Bappu	Science & Engineering	Tamil Nadu
1981		Prafulla Desai	Medicine	Maharashtra
1981		Mekhala Jha	Social Work	Bihar
1981		A. P. J. Abdul Kalam	Civil Service	Delhi
1981		Gopinath Mohanty	Literature & Education	Orissa
1981		Prabhat Kumar Mukhopadhyaya	Civil Service	West Bengal
1981		Amritlal Nagar	Literature & Education	Uttar Pradesh
1981		Mrinal Sen	Arts	West Bengal
1981		Avabai Bomanji Wadia	Social Work	Maharashtra
1982		Jasbir Singh Bajaj	Medicine	Delhi
1982		S. Balachander	Arts	Tamil Nadu
1982		Gottipati Brahmaiah	Social Work	Andhra Pradesh
1982		Rani Gaidinliu	Social Work	Nagaland
1982		Khadim Hussain Khan	Arts	Maharashtra
1982		Stella Kramrisch	Literature & Education	United States
1982		Jal Minocher Mehta	Medicine	Maharashtra
1982		Grace Louise McCann Morley	Science & Engineering	Delhi
1982		Atam Prakash	Medicine	Delhi
1982		Syed Zahoor Qasim	Civil Service	Delhi
1982		Arnee Sreenivasan Ramakrishnan	Medicine	Tamil Nadu
1982		Kamal Ranadive	Medicine	Maharashtra
1982		P. N. Pattabhirama Sastri	Literature & Education	Uttar Pradesh
1982		Jhabarmal Sharma	Literature & Education	Rajasthan
1982		Ajit Ram Verma	Science & Engineering	Delhi
1983		Richard Attenborough	Arts	United Kingdom
1983		Doraiswamy Iyengar	Arts	Karnataka
1983		V. G. Jog	Arts	West Bengal
1983		Suraj Parkash Malhotra	Civil Service	Delhi
1983		Nagendra	Literature & Education	Delhi
1983		K. Sankaran Nair	Civil Service	Kerala
1983		Prem Nazir	Arts	Kerala
1983		Swraj Paul	Social Work	United Kingdom
1983		Dr. Rajkumar	Arts	Karnataka
1983		K. G. Ramanathan	Literature & Education	Maharashtra
1983		Kershasp Tehmurasp Satarawala	Civil Service	Goa
1983		Subodh Chandra Sengupta	Literature & Education	West Bengal
1983		Adi M. Sethna	Civil Service	Delhi
1983		Arun Kumar Sharma	Science & Engineering	Delhi
1983		Benudhar Sharma (Note: Benudhar Sharma died on 26 February 1981, at the age of 86.)#	Literature & Education	Assam
1983		Bhalindra Singh	Sports	Delhi
1983		Umrao Singh	Civil Service	Haryana
1984		Horace Alexander	Literature & Education	United States
1984		Shrinarayan Chaturvedi	Literature & Education	Uttar Pradesh
1984		Chandrashekhar Lohumi	Science & Engineering	Uttar Pradesh
1984		Michael Ferreira	Sports	Maharashtra
1984		Sivaji Ganesan	Arts	Tamil Nadu
1984		Jnan Prakash Ghosh	Arts	West Bengal
1984		Kotha Satchidananda Murthy	Literature & Education	Andhra Pradesh
1984		Hanumanthappa Narasimhaiah	Literature & Education	Karnataka
1984		Sripada Pinakapani	Arts	Andhra Pradesh
1984		Ishwari Prasad	Literature & Education	Uttar Pradesh
1984		B. C. Sanyal	Arts	Madhya Pradesh
1984		Marie Seton	Literature & Education	United Kingdom
1984		Archana Sharma	Medicine	West Bengal
1984		Obaid Siddiqi	Science & Engineering	Maharashtra
1984		Kanwar Natwar Singh	Civil Service	Delhi
1984		Ganda Singh	Literature & Education	Punjab
1984		Vijay Tendulkar	Arts	Maharashtra
1984		Baldev Upadhyaya	Literature & Education	Uttar Pradesh
1985		Rais Ahmed	Literature & Education	Delhi
1985		Durga Das Basu	Public Affairs	West Bengal
1985		Shiba P. Chatterjee	Literature & Education	West Bengal
1985		Eknath Vasant Chitnis	Science & Engineering	Gujarat
1985		Virender Lal Chopra	Science & Engineering	Delhi
1985		Gurbaksh Singh	Civil Service	Delhi
1985		Santidev Ghosh	Arts	West Bengal
1985		Surinder Singh Gill	Civil Service	Delhi
1985		Bhimsen Joshi	Arts	Maharashtra
1985		Sadat Abul Masud	Public Affairs	West Bengal
1985		Kalanidhi Narayanan	Arts	Tamil Nadu
1985		Bernard Peters	Science & Engineering	Denmark
1985		Thakazhi Sivasankara Pillai	Literature & Education	Kerala
1985		Gopala Ramanujam	Social Work	Tamil Nadu
1985		Sivaraj Ramseshan	Science & Engineering	Karnataka
1985		Vuppuluri Ganapathi Sastry	Literature & Education	Andhra Pradesh
1985		Amarjit Singh	Civil Service	Rajasthan
1985		Tribhuvandas Luhar (Sundaram)	Literature & Education	Puducherry
1985		Gurbachan Singh Talib	Literature & Education	Punjab
1985		Bhalchandra Udgaonkar	Science & Engineering	Maharashtra
1985		Srinivasan Varadarajan	Civil Service	Delhi
1986		V. S. R. Arunachalam	Civil Service	Delhi
1986		Pushpa Mittra Bhargava	Medicine	Andhra Pradesh
1986		Ela Bhatt	Social Work	Gujarat
1986		Manohar Lal Chibber	Civil Service	Delhi
1986		Nasir Aminuddin Daggar	Arts	West Bengal
1986		Venkataraman Krishnamurthy	Civil Service	Delhi
1986		Jean Riboud	Public Affairs	France
1986		Sidney Dillon Ripley	Science & Engineering	United States
1986		Rajeev Sethi	Civil Service	Delhi
1986		Martand Singh	Public Affairs	Delhi
1986		C. Venkataraman Sundaram	Science & Engineering	Tamil Nadu
1986		Badri Nath Tandon	Medicine	Delhi
1986		Gulshan Lal Tandon	Civil Service	West Bengal
1986		Ram Krishna Trivedi	Public Affairs	Uttar Pradesh
1987		Nalapat Balamani Amma	Literature & Education	Kerala
1987		Kishori Amonkar	Arts	Maharashtra
1987		Srinivasa Anandaram	Civil Service	Delhi
1987		Nikhil Banerjee (Note: Nikhil Banerjee died on 27 January 1986, at the age of 54.)#	Arts	West Bengal
1987		Roddam Narasimha	Science & Engineering	Karnataka
1987		R. D. Pradhan	Civil Service	Maharashtra
1987		Annada Shankar Ray	Literature & Education	West Bengal
1987		Julio Ribeiro	Civil Service	Maharashtra
1987		Man Mohan Sharma	Science & Engineering	Maharashtra
1987		Laxmi Prasad Sihare	Civil Service	Delhi
1987		Farokh Udwadia	Medicine	Maharashtra
1987		Mohammad Yunus	Civil Service	Delhi
1988		Kushok Bakula	Public Affairs	Delhi
1988		Ram Prakash Bambah	Science & Engineering	Chandigarh
1988		Kartar Singh Duggal	Literature & Education	Delhi
1988		Ashok Sekhar Ganguly	Trade & Industry	Maharashtra
1988		Abid Hussain	Civil Service	Delhi
1988		Shreyans Prasad Jain	Social Work	Maharashtra
1988		Kelucharan Mohapatra	Arts	Orissa
1988		Bal Ram Nanda	Literature & Education	Delhi
1988		Akkineni Nageswara Rao	Arts	Andhra Pradesh
1988		Pratury Trirumala Rao	Medicine	Andhra Pradesh
1988		Renuka Ray	Public Affairs	West Bengal
1988		B. V. Sreekantan	Science & Engineering	Maharashtra
1988		Satya Pal Wahi	Trade & Industry	Uttar Pradesh
1989		Fenner Brockway (Note: Fenner Brockway died on 28 April 1988, at the age of 99.)#	Public Affairs	United Kingdom
1989		Banoo Jehangir Coyaji	Medicine	Maharashtra
1989		Girija Devi	Arts	Uttar Pradesh
1989		Kattingeri Krishna Hebbar	Arts	Maharashtra
1989		Girilal Jain	Literature & Education	Delhi
1989		Anna Rajam Malhotra	Civil Service	Maharashtra
1989		M. V. Mathur	Science & Engineering	Rajasthan
1989		Ashesh Prasad Mitra	Science & Engineering	Delhi
1989		Russi Mody	Trade & Industry	Jharkhand
1989		Suresh Shankar Nadkarni	Trade & Industry	Maharashtra
1989		Narinder Singh Randhawa	Science & Engineering	Delhi
1989		Yoshio Sakurauchi	Public Affairs	Japan
1989		Lakshman Singh	Public Affairs	Maharashtra
1989		Prakash Narain Tandon	Medicine	Delhi

== Explanatory notes ==
Foreign recipients
