= Reha =

Reha may refer to:

== People ==
=== Given name ===
- Reha Denemeç (born 1961), Turkish politician
- Reha Eken (1925–2013), Turkish footballer
- Reha Erdem (born 1960), Turkish film director and screenwriter
- Reha Erginer (born 1970), Turkish football player and coach
- Reha İsvan (1925–2013), Turkish author, journalist and political activist
- Reha Kapsal (born 1963), Turkish football manager
- Reha Kutlu (born 1945), Turkish-French producer and journalist
- Reha Muhtar (1959–2026), Turkish journalist
- Reha Özcan (born 1965), Turkish actor
- Reha Oğuz Türkkan (1920–2010), Turkish writer
- Řehá, Czech-language diminutive of Řehoř

=== Surname ===
- Gabi Reha (born 1964), German swimmer

== Other ==
- Reha Mota, a village in Bhuj Taluka, Kutch district, India

== See also ==
- Recha (disambiguation)
- Rekha (disambiguation)
