= Sanjay Sharma =

Sanjay Sharma may refer to:

- Sanjay Sharma (ophthalmologist) (born 1967), Canadian ophthalmologist
- Sanjay Sharma (politician), Indian politician
- Sanjay Sharma (serial killer) (born 1969), Indian serial killer
