= Richa Sharma =

Richa Sharma is the name of:

- Richa Sharma (singer) (born 1974), Indian film playback singer and devotional singer
- Richa Sharma (actress) (1963–1996), Indian Bollywood actress
- Reecha Sharma, Nepali actress

== See also ==
- Reecha (disambiguation)
- Sharma, an Indian surname
