= Chaturvedi Dwarka Prasad Sharma =

Indian writer of Hindi prose

- Born: Dwarka Prasad Chaturvedi c. 1820; Etawah, Uttar Pradesh, British India
- Other name: Sharma
- Occupation: Writer
- Known for: Hindi Literature

Born in about 1820 Chaturvedi Shri Dwarka Prasad "Sharma" was an Indian writer of Hindi prose. He wrote more than 150 books, but primarily is known for his translations of Valmiki Ramayana from Sanskrit to Hindi.

== Early life ==
He initially lived in Etawah in what became Uttar Pradesh in India and eventually moved to Allahabad.

== Career ==
He is an early writer of Hindi prose. He lost his government job when he wrote about the life and character of Warren Hastings. He then devoted all of his time to writing and literature. He first started a monthly magazine called Raghavendra.

Chaturvedi was arrangement minister in Hindi Sahitya Sammelan for many years and was given the title of "Sharma".

== Books ==
Some of his main Hindi works are:

- Warren Hastings
- Robert Clive
- Ramanujacharya
- Allah
- Shabdarth Kaustubh (Sanskrit to Hindi Dictionary)
- Shabdarth Parijat (Hindi to Hindi Dictionary)
- Madhav Mishr Nibandhavali
- Valmiki Ramayan Hindi Anuvad
  (present-day Gujarat, India)
- Bal Sahityamala Series (20+ books)
