= Evin Çiçek =

Turkish writer

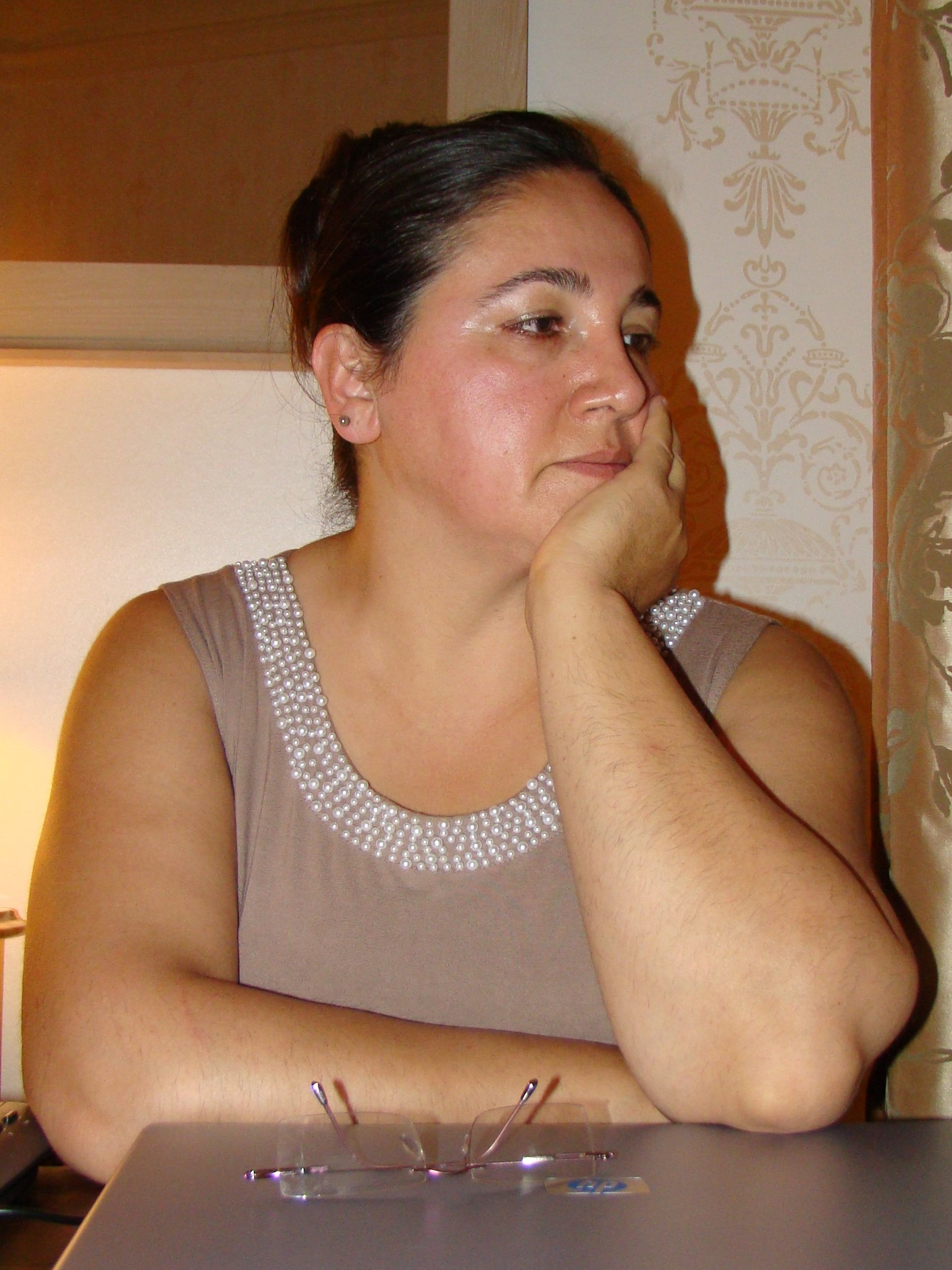
- Sevê Evin Çiçek in 2010
- Born: 31 March 1961 (age 65); Koçgiri, Turkey
- Occupations: journalist, investigative reporter, author, poet

Sevê Evin Çiçek, born on March 31, 1961, in İmranlı, Turkey, better known as Evin Çiçek, is a Kurdish-Swiss journalist, researcher, author, poet, and human rights advocate.

== Biography ==
=== Place of birth ===
Sevê Evin Çiçek was born in 1961 in Kamilava-Maciran-Çît (İmranlı in Turkish) in the Koçgiri region. Since the establishment of the Republic of Turkey, the Koçgiri region has been divided between the provinces of Sivas, Tunceli, Erzincan, and Gümüşhane. Her native hamlet, Çimen (a Kurdish name meaning plateau), belongs to the Mılan tribe and, together with the hamlets of Arçaylan, Çomeldin, Moxindi, and Ekreg, forms the village of Yoncabayırı. The village is located on the slopes of Mountain Çengelli. This mountain, which reaches an altitude of 2,596 meters, was originally inhabited by a Kurdish population with animist and Zoroastrian traditions, who consider it sacred.

=== Education ===
Sevê Evin Çiçek began primary school in her native village, and in her second year, her family moved to Istanbul, where she continued her education at Kılıç Ali Paşa Primary School in the Ortaköy district and completed it at Oruçgazi Primary School in the Aksaray district. In 1974, she attended Cibali Girls' High School for her secondary education and graduated from the same institution in 1980. The following year, she enrolled in the Faculty of Economic and Administrative Sciences at Marmara University, graduating in 1985 with a degree in Public Administration. After graduating, she improved her language skills by taking English courses for a year. Having left Turkey in 1993, she also attended courses at the University of Fribourg (Switzerland). She is fluent in Kurdish, Turkish, and French and has a solid foundation in Italian and English.

=== Family situation ===
Married in 1983 and mother of two children, she has been separated since 1993 and divorced in 1999.

== Political engagement ==
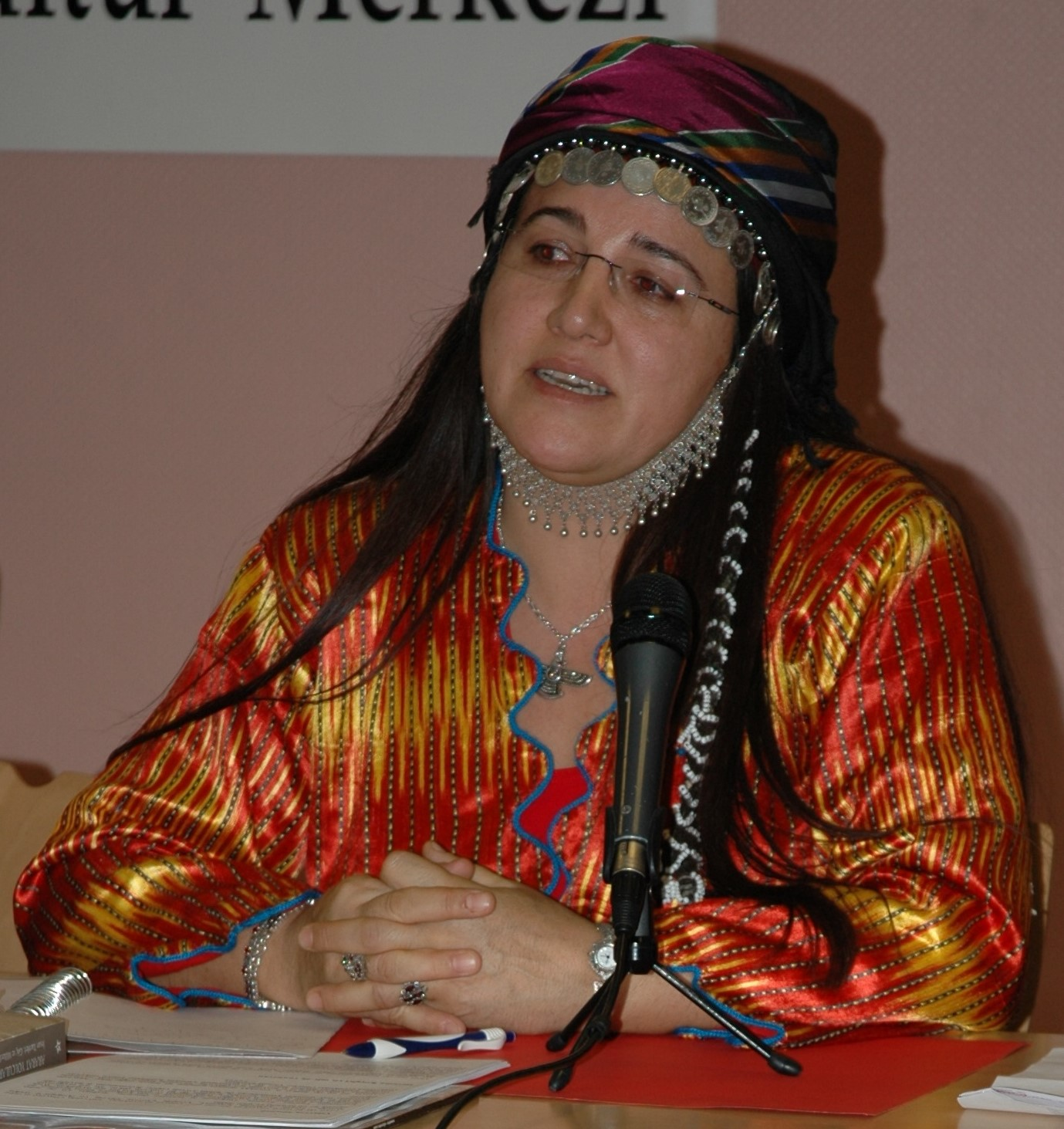
Sevê Evin Çiçek in 2005.

=== Professional Experiences ===
Coming from a working-class family with peasant origins, Sevê Evin Çiçek worked in a sewing workshop after completing her high school diploma. She also continued to work in various fields during her university studies. After graduating, she began her career as a journalist in 1988. Her first article focused on "The Valley of the Butchers of Siirt." She continued her career as a journalist, researcher, and author.

=== Beginnings in Politics ===
Sevê Evin Çiçek began taking an interest in politics during her secondary school years. She became one of the many victims of Turkey's military coup on September 12, 1980. She was detained during the trial of the KAWA group on February 9, 1981 (a political movement for the independence of Kurdistan). After enduring two months of torture in a specialized center, she was imprisoned. She was initially held at the Selimiye Military Barracks and later transferred to Metris Prison once its construction was completed. She was released in September 1981. From 1986, she lived in Siirt, where she participated in the leadership of the People's Labor Party (HEP - Halkın Emek Partisi) and the Democracy Party (DEP - Demokrasi Partisi).

=== Human Rights Advocates ===
In 1988, Sevê Evin Çiçek became one of the founding members of the local branch of the Human Rights Association in Siirt and took charge of this branch starting in 1990. In the same year, she was awarded the Human Rights Watch Prize for Human Rights.

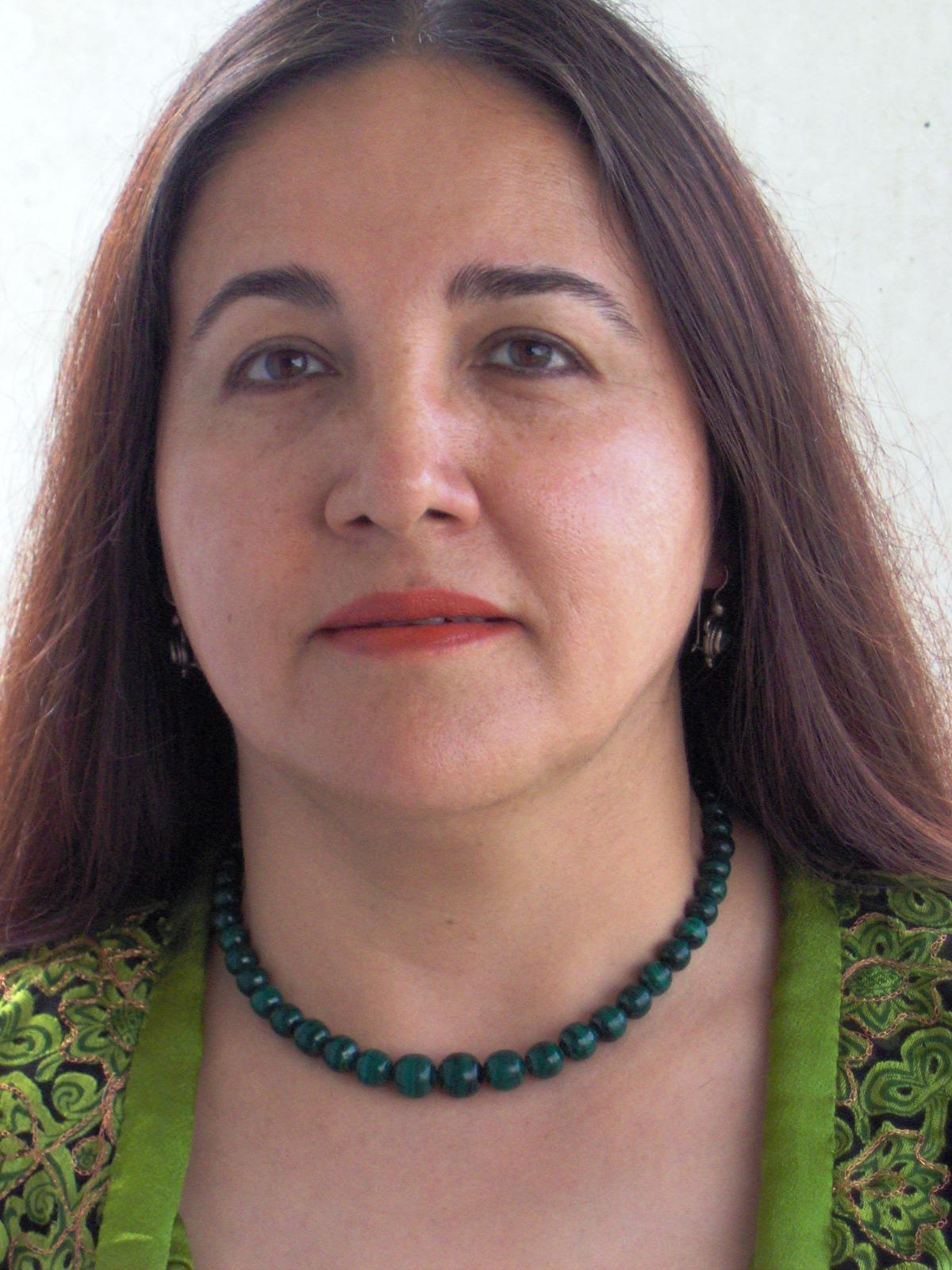
Evin Çiçek

=== Exile ===
In 1993, Sevê Evin Çiçek went for a three-month period to Iraqi Kurdistan, to a PKK camp (Partiya Karkeran Kurdistan in Kurdish, Workers' Party of Kurdistan in English) located in the village of Zele (a village situated between Sulaymaniyah and the Iraq-Iran border) to conduct research on "war and man" and "the law within the PKK." After learning of her trip to Zele, an Ankara court began collecting evidence to charge her with supporting a terrorist organization. To avoid a second detention and several years of imprisonment, Sevê Evin Çiçek left Turkey in November 1993 to apply for political asylum in Switzerland. After many years of living in Ticino and Fribourg, she took steps to become naturalized and acquired Swiss citizenship in 2008. Despite the distance separating her from her homeland and having not set foot in the Middle East since her exile, she remains actively interested in Kurdish political news, which she comments on, as in the interview she gave in September 2017 to the Kurdish radio station based in Moscow, Ria Taza, regarding the 2017 referendum on the independence of Iraqi Kurdistan.

== Literary Criticism and Censorship ==
Despite her exile and the challenges she faced as a refugee, she published her research in various books. Her works focus on the Kurdish conflict in the Middle East, exile, and feminism in Kurdish society. By directly presenting a large number of diverse testimonies, her publications echo the contemporary Kurdish condition. While her first publications were in Sweden, the following ones were directly published in Turkey. Her books were banned from publication, censored, and her publisher was sentenced to fifteen months in prison by the Beyoğlu court.

She also published Le cri des souvenirs, a three-volume collection of poems. The poetry she composes stands out for its characteristics of narrative poetry and committed poetry, attributes that reflect her life experiences and activism. While her research was written in Turkish, her poetry is written in Kurdish. She defines this position as a clear claim: to write in Kurdish in order to preserve the link between Kurdish culture and identity with the Kurdish population. She explains this choice, a factor of independence for a society striving for equality:

« Ziman nebe, helbest nabe. Di serî de helbest bi dev e. [...] Zimanê min qedexe ye. Bi wê ve girêdayî helbest jî qedexe ye. [...] Ji bo Kurdan azadî tune. Helbestvanê/a Kurd azad nîne. Dewleta ku azadiya jinê negire berçav, kevneperestiya berê diparêze, xwedî dike. Ya ku zimanê me diparêze û dide fêr (hîn) kirin, jin e. Ya ku bi recmê (di bin barana keviran de) tê kuştin ziman e, jina Kurd e. Bi kuştina jinê, ziman jî li holê tê rakirin. »

— Sevê Evin Çiçek, Sevê Evin Çiçek, Interview of November 30, 2005, from Pen-Kurd.org

English: "Without a language, there is no poetry. Poetry begins at the edge of the lips. [...] My language is forbidden. Therefore, poetry is also forbidden. [...] There is no freedom for the Kurds. Kurdish poets are not free. The state that does not protect its women preserves the conservatism of the past. The one who protects our language and teaches it is the woman. The one who is killed by stoning is the language, the woman. With the murder of the woman, the language is also torn from society." »

— Sevê Evin Çiçek, Interview of November 30, 2005, from Pen-Kurd.org

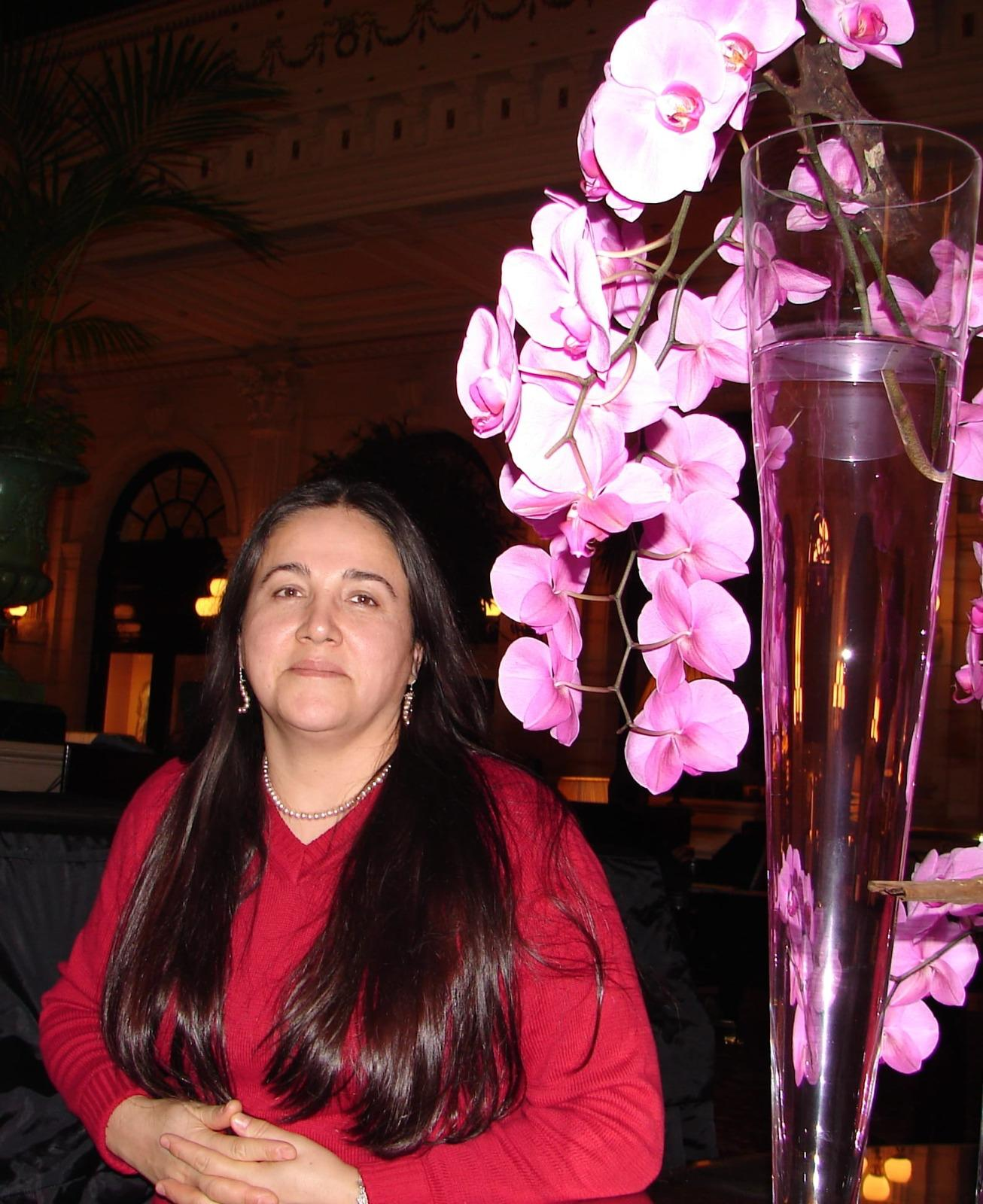
Evin Çiçek

== Works ==
Sevê Evin Çiçek is a member of Pen a Kurd, a branch of the international PEN club. In addition to a substantial number of published articles, she has also written various books. Apart from her poems written in Kurdish, all of her works are initially published in Turkish. As of January 1, 2024, there is no French edition of her works.

The various books she has published are the result of investigations and research she has conducted in the fields of sociology and history, specifically on Kurdish societies in exile and at war, as well as on Kurdish history.

=== List of Works ===
- Love Cannot Be Limited! If You Love, Fight (Sevgiye Sınır Koyamazsınız! Seviyorsan Savaş), 1998, Medya Editions, Sweden, 244 pages.
- The National Liberation Movement of Koçgiri (Koçgiri Ulusal Kurtuluş Hareketi), 1999, APEC Editions, Sweden, 272 pages.
- Prisoners of Their Passions (Tutkular ve Tutsaklar), 2000, Peri Editions, Istanbul, 384 pages.
- The Travelers of Ararat – Human Trafficking, Exile, and Asylum (Ararat Yolcuları - İnsan Ticareti, Göç, Mültecilik), 2005, Peri Editions, Istanbul, 228 pages.
- Female Judgment (Kadınca Yargılama), 2005, Peri Editions, İstanbul, 542 pages.
- Kemalism and the Kurdish National Question - Volume 1 (Kemalizm ve Kürd Ulusal Sorunu - I), 2020, Sîtav Editions, Turkey, 448 pages.
- Kemalism and the Kurdish National Question - Volume 2 (Kemalizm ve Kürd Ulusal Sorunu - II), 2021, Sîtav Editions, Turkey, 512 pages.
- Kemalism and the Kurdish National Question - Volume 3 (Kemalizm ve Kürd Ulusal Sorunu - III), 2022, Sîtav Editions, Turkey, 352 pages.
- Kemalism and the Kurdish National Question - Volume 4 (Kemalizm ve Kürd Ulusal Sorunu - IV), 2023, Sîtav Editions, Turkey, 896 pages.

=== Poetry Collection ===
- The Cry of Memories - Volumes I, II, III (Awaza Serpêhatiyan I, II, III), 2004, Peri Editions, Istanbul, 119, 144, and 173 pages
