= Dheeraj =

Dheeraj, also spelled Dhiraj, is a male given name of Sanskrit origin meaning patience.

- Dhiraj Deshmukh, Indian politician from Maharashtra and member of Maharashtra legislative assembly
- Dheeraj Dhoopar, Indian actor.
- Dheeraj Hinduja, Indian businessman.
- Dheeraj Kumar, Indian actor.
- Dheeraj Sarna, Indian actor.
- Dheeraj Sharma (professor)
- Dheeraj Sharma (filmmaker)
- Dheeraj Singh Moirangthem, Football player
