= Recha =

Recha may refer to:

== People ==
=== Given name ===
- Recha Sternbuch (1905–1971), Swiss woman who rescued Jews during the Holocaust
- Recha Freier (1892–1984), founder of the Youth Aliyah
- Recha Charlotte Cohn (1898-1983), German Israeli architect
- Recha, a fictional character from the 1779 play Nathan the Wise by Gotthold Ephraim Lessing

=== Surname ===
- Amy Recha (born 1992), Singaporean footballer
- Marc Recha (born 1970), Catalan Spanish film director and screenwriter

== Other ==
- Recha, a Belarusian periodical published by Mikola Abramchyk, Belarusian journalist and émigré politician
- Recha, a 2016 album by Dzieciuki, Belarusian folk punk group
- 573 Recha, a minor planet

== See also ==
- Reecha (disambiguation)
- Rekha (given name)
- Richa
