= Deepak =

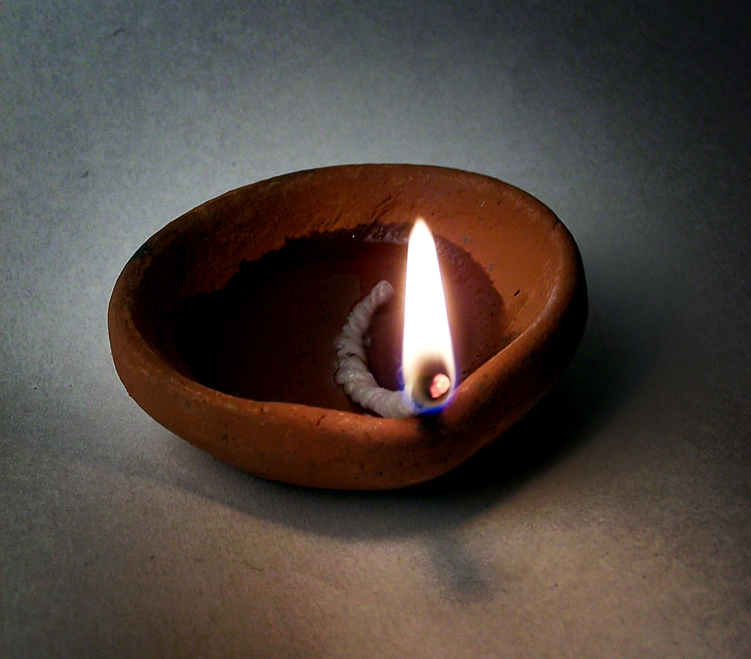
A basic earthen oil diya used for Diwali

Deepak (दीपक / دیپک), a Hindi word meaning "lamp" from the Sanskrit source word for light, is a masculine given name and a surname. Names like Deepa (now commonly also used for females), Deepika (female), Deepthi (female), Deepam (male), and Deepali (female) are related to Deepak.

- Deepak (male) – a lamp or candle; meaning one who gives light on his own behalf
- Deepa (male) – a lamp
- Deep (male) – wick/flame of the lamp; Hindi/north Indian derivation of Sanskrit "Deepa" (male)
- Deepankar (male) – one who lights lamps
- Deependra (male) – lord of light
- Deepit (male) – lighted
- Deepanjali (female) – offerings of lamps
- Deepmala (female) – garland of lamps, tower of lamps
- Deepali (female) – collection of lamps
- Deepika (female) – a little light
- Deepamalika (female) – garland of lamps
- Deepunja (male) – light of a lamp
- Deepti/Deepthi (female) – glow, shine
- Deepanshu (male) – glow

== Given name ==
- Deepak Bohara, Nepalese politician
- Deepak Chahar (born 1992), Indian cricketer
- Deepak Chopra (born 1946), Indian-American writer and new age alternative medicine promoter
- Deepak Dev (born 1978), Indian composer
- Deepak Dinkar (born 1979), Indian actor
- Deepak Kumar (historian) (born 1952), Indian historian
- Deepak Kumar (physicist) (1946–2016), Indian physicist and professor
- Deepak Kumar (sport shooter) (born 1987), Indian sport shooter
- Deepak Mondal, Indian footballer
- Deepak Obhrai, Canadian politician
- Deepak Parashar (born 1952), Indian actor
- Deepak Perwani (born 1973), Pakistani fashion designer and actor
- Deepak Prakash (born 1989), Indian politician
- Deepak Sharma (disambiguation)
- Deepak Shirke (born 1957), Indian actor
- Deepak Thakur, Indian hockey player
- Deepak Tijori (born 1961), Indian director and actor
- Deepak Tripathi, British historian
- Deepak Verma, British actor and writer
- Deepak, stage name of Arjan Bajwa, Indian actor

== Surname ==
- J. Sai Deepak (born 1985), Indian lawyer, columnist, and author
- P. A. Deepak, Indian musician
- Swadesh Deepak (born 1943), Indian playwright and author
