= Dheeraj Sharma =

Dheeraj Sharma may refer to:

- Dheeraj Sharma (professor), professor of management
- Dheeraj Sharma (filmmaker) (born 1982), Indian social worker and documentary film maker
