= Zeynep Oral =

Turkish journalist

- Born: Zeynep Birsel; 15 February 1946 (age 79); Istanbul, Turkey
- Occupation(s): Journalist, writer, theatre critic,
- Employer(s): Milliyet and Cumhuriyet newspapers
- Known for: Founder of Milliyet Art periodical
- Spouse: Ahmet Oral
- Children: 2

Zeynep Birsel Oral (born 15 February 1946) is a Turkish journalist. She is also a writer, theatre critic and a cultural editor.

== Life ==
Zeynep Birsel was born in Istanbul, Turkey, on 15 February 1946. She graduated from the American Collegiate Institute in İzmir. She also studied in École supérieure de journalisme de Paris in Paris, France, in 1966, and at the L'Institut des Etudes Théâtrales of Sorbonne University during 1964–1967. She is married to Ahmet Oral, and is the mother of two sons; Emre and Kerem.

== Career ==
Between 1968 and 2001, she served in Milliyet newspaper as a columnist. In 1972, while still in Milliyet, she became one of the founders of Milliyet Sanat, a periodical dedicated to art. Currently, she is a columnist in Cumhuriyet newspaper.

She also participated in the establishment of "Theatre Critics Association of Turkey", the Nazım Hikmet Foundation, "Turkey-Greece Friendship Association", KA-DER ("Association to Support and Train Female Candidates"), the Mother Culture Foundation and WINPEACE ("Women's Peace Initiative"). She is a member of the "Turkish Authors Syndicate", PEN Turkey and the "Turkish Journalist Association".

== Books ==
Her books are the following:

- 1995: Leyla Gencer'e Armağan ("A gift to Leyla Gencer")
- 1995: Kara Sevda ("Melancholy")
- 1998: Kadmandu'dan Meksika'ya ("From Kadmandu to Mexico")
- 2003: Bir Ses ("A Sound")
- 2008: Leyla Gencer Tutkunun Romanı ("A Story of Passion)
- 2010: Uzakdoğu'm ("My Fareast")
- 2010: Kadın Olmak ("To be a Woman")
- 2010: Bu Cennet Bu Cehennem ("This Heaven, this Hell")
- 2011: Meslek Yarası ("Wound of Occupation")
- 2011: O Büyülü İnsanlar ("These Magic People")
- 2011: Esintiler 2000–2010 ("Breezes 200-2010")
- 2012: O Güzel İnsanlar ("These Nice People")
- 2014: Direniş ve Umut ("Opposition and Hope"), memoir of Reha İsvan
- 2014: Kadın Gözüyle Yazmak ve Yaşamak ("Writing and Living in the Eye of a Woman")
- Leyla Gencer, Opera'nın ilk divası ("Leyla Gencer the First Diva of the Opera")
- Karanlıktaki Işık ("Light in the Darkness")
