= William Georgetti Scholarship =

The William Georgetti Scholarship is one of New Zealand's most prestigious postgraduate awards. It is named after the influential landowner William Georgetti who bequeathed his estate for the purposes of establishing a perpetual scholarship so that young New Zealanders could continue their studies. Georgetti’s hope was “that the best brains available shall receive the benefit of this trust”.

The scholarship is administered by Universities New Zealand - Te Pōkai Tara. Recipients of the award are selected annually by a panel led by the Governor General of New Zealand. Typically between three and seven awards are given, although there may be as many as twelve. The committee may decide not to award the scholarship at all if no suitable candidate is found. Unlike most postgraduate scholarships, the William Georgetti Scholarship is not restricted to location (recipients may study at any university in any country), discipline or prior institution.

The official description of the scholarship states that its "purpose is to encourage postgraduate study and research, normally in New Zealand, in a field that in the opinion of the Scholarship Board is important to the social, cultural or economic development of New Zealand." In practice however, the award is more often used to support study overseas. Since 2007, 40% of recipients have used their award to fund studies in the United Kingdom, 35% for study in the United States of America, 17% for studies in New Zealand and 8% for studies elsewhere.

William Georgetti 1867 - 1943 New Zealand Scholarship Founder

== Value ==
Recipients may be awarded up to NZD$20,000 per year for Masters study and NZD$30,000 per year for doctoral study. For those students studying overseas the award can be up to NZD$45,000 per year. The maximum period of tenure is three years. The maximum full award therefore is NZD$135,000.

The Trustees are able to alter the value of the award in certain circumstances however, for example 2013 recipient Sarah Paterson was awarded an additional NZD$6000 due to specific extra fees at her chosen institution, the University of Glasgow.

== Eligibility ==
Applicants must:

- Have resided in New Zealand for a period of at least five years immediately preceding the year of selection.
- Be of good moral character and repute.
- Be of good health.
- Hold a degree of a university in New Zealand or elsewhere or any other academic qualification of a university or other institution of learning (in New Zealand or elsewhere) reasonably equivalent in the opinion of the Scholarship Board to a degree of a university in New Zealand.

Applicants affiliated with one of New Zealand's eight universities must apply through their university. Each university is permitted to put four of these applications forward, from which selection Universities New Zealand compiles a shortlist for interview. Interviews are conducted at Government House in Wellington. Interviewees have their travel paid for by the Trust.

While there is no specific minimum Grade Point Average (GPA) requirement, in practise successful applicants will have a GPA over 8 or more using the 1-9 scale used by Universities New Zealand. The mean GPA on the 1-9 scale for successful applicants between 2007 and 2015 was 8.60.

== History ==
William Georgetti’s family were some of the first Europeans to settle in the Whanganui area of New Zealand in the 19th century. William was born there on 12 July 1867 to Augustine and Ellen (nee Davidson, of Montrose in Scotland), one of nine children. The family are said to have had a strong relationship with local iwi and were central to the development of the region as we know it today. Georgetti Street in Whanganui stands as testament to that legacy. They owned Bastia Hill which was named after the town in Corsica near where Augustine Georgetti was born at Olcani in 1834. Family legend indicates that Augustin Georgetti (Giorgetti in Corsica) travelled to New Zealand on the ship of a French explorer having 'jumped ship' in Corsica. When Augustine died, his estate was divided between his children which entered into New Zealand Legislation as the Georgetti Trust Estate Act.

The young William wished to study to become a doctor, but ultimately he followed his father's wishes and became a successful landowner. He owned extensive property in New Zealand and Australia, as well as shares in timber and gold. Georgetti travelled all around the world with his wealth, but he never went too far from home, and ultimately settled at a farm in Hastings. His farm was a sheep farm called ‘Crissoge’, formerly part of the large Donnelly holdings and the home of Airni Donnelly, formerly Karauria a prominent Hawkes Bay chieftainess, and he stayed there with his wife Mary and his children Grace Annie Swhan (Aveling), Douglas Carmichael and Joyce Ellen Davidson (Henderson) from 1918 until his death in 1943 at the age of 76.

Georgetti instructed that the residue of his estate form a perpetual charitable trust for the purpose of funding scholarships. Georgetti believed that "whatever fluctuations there may be in prices for primary produce and in land values and whatever vicissitudes the said Dominion may pass through farming land will always be the most stable asset in which to invest money". In keeping with Georgetti's wishes, the trust still holds all 125.5 ha of Crissoge and it is currently leased as eight orchards. Rental income from the orchards, along with other investments, fund the William Georgetti Scholarship.

William Georgetti (1867-1943) as a young man

== List of notable William Georgetti Scholarship recipients ==
- Mai Chen: lawyer and managing partner of Chen Palmer Public and Employment Law Specialists
- Sophie Curtis-Ham: Senior Intelligence Analyst at New Zealand Police and NZSEA Young Professional of the Year nominee
- Pablo German: Co-founder and Scientific Director of Pheromite
- Jessica Kerr: Lawyer, lecturer and Coordinator of the Seychelles Legal Information Institute
- Jessica C. Lai: Senior Lecturer, Victoria University of Wellington, and author of "Indigenous Cultural Heritage and Intellectual Property Rights: Learning from the New Zealand Experience?" (2014)
- Lauren J. Lindsay: Senior Associate, Allen and Overy
- Avinash Sharma: doctor and former player for Oxford University cricket team
- Jeroen Speak: composer
- Steve Urlich: ecologist, nature writer, and lecturer in environmental management at Lincoln University, New Zealand
