= Jeroen Speak =

New Zealand-born UK-based composer

Jeroen Speak (born June 1969) is a New Zealand-born UK-based composer.

== Biography ==
Jeroen Speak received undergraduate training in New Zealand. With the aid of the William Georgetti and Herbert Sutcliffe scholarships he completed a master's degree at Victoria University of Wellington, where he graduated in 1993. In 1994 he was the Composer in Residence at the Nelson School of Music before moving to Britain where he completed a D Phil at the University of Sussex under Michael Finnissy, he has also studied with John Young, and Jonathan Harvey.

In 2004 he was awarded a place in the 'Visiting Arts' exchange programme with Taiwan where he developed his interests in Chinese and Taiwanese music and aesthetics. In 2005 he was awarded an 'Artist Links' fellowship by the British Council to further develop these interests in Shanghai, China.

In 1992 he was the recipient of the ACL Yoshiro Irino Memorial Prize at the 14th Asian Composers' League Festival, in the same year he was awarded first place the Asia-Pacific Festival Competition for Young New Zealand Composers for his work Plagal Nuances. In 1998 he was awarded first place in the 19th ACL Festival young composers competition in Taiwan for his work Auxetos. The first New Zealander to have won the prize. He received the Philip Neil Memorial Prize from the University of Otago the following year for his work Etudes. His work has been performed worldwide, including at the Darmstadt, Gaudeamus, and Huddersfield Music Festivals, as well as several ISCM World Music Days festivals. In 2006 his work Silk Dialogue VI was commissioned by the ISCM ensemble in Residence Ensemble Antipodes. He has worked with many of the worlds leading exponents of new music, including Forum Music (Taiwan), Lontano Ensemble (UK), ELISION Ensemble (Australia), Stroma (New Zealand), the Fidelio Trio, as well as soloists such as clarinetist Richard Haynes, and pianist Nicolas Hodges. In 2013-2014 he was Composer in Residence at the New Zealand School of Music.

== Style ==
Speak's work can not be easily positioned in the standard European tradition, perhaps a legacy of his New Zealand roots and the influence of his interests in Chinese culture, his style is balanced between the ephemeral and the rigorous, characterised, in his own words, by “polemical internal musical debate, self contradictory behaviour, the simultaneous presentation of 'truth' with 'deceit', a continuous unification of opposites”. This dichotomy is reflected in his work 'Epeisodos', for solo E flat clarinet (1998), which, while rigorous in terms of its various systems of note and register generation, is also partly a transcription of an electroencephalograph of a patient suffering an epileptic seizure, and his piano trio 'Lingua e Realidade' (2007) which explores the Brazilian Vilem Flusser's ideas relating to the function and nature of language, and its focus on the pre-conceptual state just prior to symbolisation.

== Works ==
- Arabesques (2001), violin and piano
- Architecture of Time, The (2007), piano and percussion
- Auxetos, 1998, string quartet
- Character of Time, The (2003), solo piano
- Choruses for Virgins Widows and Innocents (2000) flute, clarinet, viola and piano
- Comme Le son Evolue (2002) string orchestra and 2 harps
- Epeisodos (1998), solo Eb clarinet
- Etudes (1994), violin and piano
- Event Horizon (2010), 3 percussionists and piano
- Gu Ta (1998), 3 percussionists
- Lingua e Realidade (2008), piano, cello, violin
- Molto Intimo (2016), clarinet, trumpet, trombone
- Music fur witwen, jungfrauen und unschuldige (2005), harp, flute, clarinet, string quartet
- Percussion Concerto (2012), piano, 3 percussionists
- Quatro Stati D'essere Immaginari (1999), solo contra bass
- Silk Dialogue V (2006), flute, clarinet, bassoon, Horn 2 violins, viola, cello, contra bass
- Silk Dialogue VI (2008), flute, clarinet in Eb, string quartet
- String Theory (2003), string orchestra
- Tarantelle (2002), solo cello
- Shadow Aspect (2013), solo piano
- String Quartet III (2013), string quartet
- Eratosthenes' Sieve (2014), mixed ensemble
- Jungs Shadow (2012), cello and piano

== Recordings ==
- The Wai-te-ata Music Press Collection of New Zealand Music No.7 (2004)
- Musical Kaleidoscope: Taiwans Contemporary Music 4 (2008)
- Sunrise: Music for Young Pianists (2007)
- Take Flight: Music for Young Pianists (2011)
