= Reecha =

Reecha may refer to:

- Reecha Sharma, 21st century Nepalese film actress and semi-finalist of the Miss Nepal 2007 pageant
- Reecha Sinha (born 1996), Indian actress and model

== See also ==
- Richa, Sanskrit term for a Vedic verse
- Richa (surname)
