= Pooja Sharma =

Pooja Sharma may refer to:

- Pooja Sharma (entrepreneur) (born c. 1980), Indian businessperson who empowered women
- Pooja Sharma (Indian actress) (born 1989), Indian model and TV actress
- Pooja Sharma (Nepalese actress) (born 1992), Nepalese actress, film producer and singer
- Pooja Sharma (kabaddi) (born 1984), Indian kabaddi player
- Pooja Sharma (social worker) (born 1996), Indian social worker
- Pooja Sharma, a character in the 2005 film Vaada
- Pooja Sharma, a character in the 2001 film Kabhi Khushi Kabhie Gham
