= Surekha =

Surekha may refer to:

- Surekha (artist), Indian video artist
- Surekha (actress), Indian film and television actress
- Surekha Sikri (1945–2021), Indian actress

== See also ==
- Rekha (disambiguation)
