= Nashebaaz =

- Nashebaaz
- Directed by: Dheeraj Sharma
- Produced by: Dhirendre Khandelwal
- Cinematography: Neeraj Agnihotri
- Edited by: Neeraj Agnihotri
- Release date: 10 August 2016 (Serbia)
- Running time: 1h 7min
- Country: India
- Language: Hindi

Nashebaaz: The Dying People of Delhi (English: Drug Addict) is 2016 Documentary film that was directed by Dheeraj Sharma. It surveys the lives of homeless drug and substance abusers in Delhi. The roadside drug abusers that are called as Smakia and are often considered untouchable and nuisance to the society. This film took five years to be completed and had its premiere in Serbia in 2016. In 2017, a clip from the film became popular, later becoming an internet meme.

== Background ==
Nashebaaz explores the problem of drug addiction in homeless people in Delhi that has been overlooked for several years. People visit Delhi in search of work and a better life, but when they are unable to find work they end up living on the streets. They are eventually introduced to some highly addictive drugs like heroin, pharmaceutical drugs and inhalant drugs. And as a form of escapism they are entrapped into the quagmire of drug addiction. Some drugs are so cheap that can even be bought for five rupees. It was filmed over a period of 5 years, from 2011 to its release in 2016. Part of the reason it took that length of time was the unapproachable nature for homeless people.

== Reception ==
In 2017, a clip of the documentary became popular on the internet. The kid featured in the documentary named Kamlesh that talked about his Solution Addiction became an internet meme and had more than 20 million views. Dheeraj Sharma slammed the memes and called it very insensitive. I

On 12, November, 2017 Uday Foundation tweeted to the CM of Delhi, Arvind Kejriwal, to come forward and help these addicts.
