= Deepak Sharma (writer) =

Indian writer

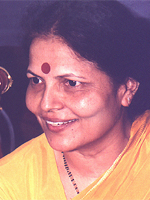

Deepak Sharma (born 30 November 1946) is an Indian writer, best known for her short stories in Hindi and English. Between 1993 and 2021, she has published twenty one short stories. In 2021, she was awarded the Sahitya Bhushan Samman by the Uttar Pradesh Hindi Sansthan.
