= Manish Sharma =

Manish Sharma may refer to:

- Manish Sharma (cricketer, born 1981), Indian cricketer who plays for the Chandigarh Lions
- Manish Sharma (cricketer, born 1996), Indian cricketer
- Maneesh Sharma (born 1973), Indian filmmaker
