= Pratury Trirumala Rao =

Indian pediatrician

- Born: Andhra Pradesh, India
- Died: 1997
- Occupations: Pediatrician; Writer
- Known for: Pediatrics
- Children: Lakshmi Pratury
- Awards: Padma Bhushan

Pratury Trirumala Rao (died 1997) was an Indian pediatrician and a writer of medical and non-fiction literature. He was a professor of pediatrics at the Gandhi Medical College, Hyderabad. He was the author of two books on pediatric medicine in English, The insulin requirements of children with diabetes mellitus maintained in good control and Pediatric Problems in Developing Countries), two books in Telugu Gāndhījītō paricayaṃ and Gadacina Rojulu) and two biographical accounts (Living as a Doctor, published by Bharatiya Vidya Bhavan) and (Glimpses of American Life, published by the Cultural Renaissance Society of India). The Government of India awarded him the third highest civilian honour of the Padma Bhushan, in 1988, for his contributions to medical science. He died in 1997.

He had a daughter, Lakshmi Pratury, a US-based social worker. A yoga institute in Hyderabad, Padma Bushan DRP Tirumala Rao Institute of Yoga is named after him.

== Bibliography ==
- Pratury Tirumala Rao (1953). The insulin requirements of children with diabetes mellitus maintained in good control. OCLC 148130768.
- Pratury Tirumala Rao (1970). Pediatric Problems in Developing Countries. Orient Longmans. ASIN B000RH1VU4.
- Pratury Tirumala Rao (1970). Gāndhījītō paricayaṃ. Viswabharati Socio-Cultural League.
- Pratury Tirumala Rao (1996). Living as a Doctor. Bharatiya Vidya Bhavan.
- Pratury Tirumala Rao (1973). Glimpses of American Life. Cultural Renaissance Society of India. p. 184. ASIN B0006CIQYO.
- Pratury Tirumala Rao (2000). Gadacina Rojulu.

== See also ==
- Gandhi Medical College
