= P. N. Pattabhirama Sastri =

Indian philologist and scholar of Sanskrit literature and Vedas

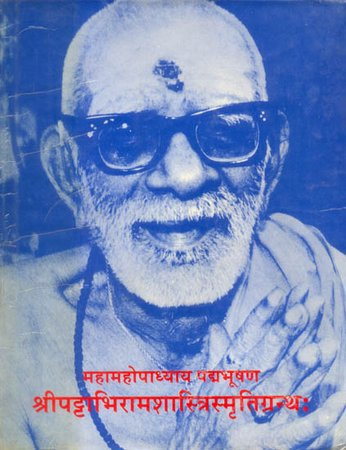
- A photo of Sanskrit scholar P. N. Pattabhirama Sastri
- Born: India
- Occupations: Scholar; Educationist; Academic
- Known for: Studies of Vedas and Sanskrit literature
- Awards: Padma Bhushan

Pudukkottai Nattar Pattabhirama Sastri was an Indian philologist and scholar of Sanskrit literature and Vedas, known for his works on Sanskrit Philology and Mīmāṃsā or the hermenutics of the Vedas. He was the founder vice chancellor of the Rashtriya Sanskrit Vidyapeetha, a deemed university dedicated to Sanskrit studies. He was also the founder of a non governmental organization in Uttar Pradesh for the promotion of arts, culture and education, which is now known as Shri Pattabhirama Shastri Veda Mimansa Anusandhan Kendra. Vaidikaśikṣādarśanabindhuḥ, Āpastambaśrautasūtra Dhūrtasvāmibhāsya, Mīmāṃsāśāstramālā, Tautātitamatatilaka and Śāstradīpikā, prabhāsahitā are some of his notable works. The Government of India awarded him the third highest civilian honour of the Padma Bhushan, in 1982, for his contributions to literature and education. Rashtriya Sanskrit Vidyapeetha honored its founder vice chancellor by naming its central library as Mahamahopadhyaya Sri Pattabhirama Sastri Library. The 8th volume of Kendriya-Saṃskṛtavidyāpīṭham anuvādagranthamālā has been republished as Mahamahopadhyaya Padmabhushana Sri P.N. Pattabhirama Sastri commemoration volume in his honor.

== Selected bibliography ==
- Āpastamba; A. Cinnasvāmiśāstrī; P. N. Pattabhirama Sastri (1955). Āpastambaśrautasūtra Dhūrtasvāmibhāsya. Oriental Institute.
- P. N.Pattabhirama Sastri (1976). Vyasa Siksha: Along with Vedataijas commentary of Sri Surya Narain Suravadhani & Sarva Lakshanmanjari Sangraha of Sri Raja Ghanpathi. Chaukhambha Sanskrit Sansthan.
- P. N. Pattabhirama Sastri (1980). Vaidikaśikṣādarśanabindhuḥ. Sampūrṇānda-Saṃskr̥ta-Viśvavidyālayaḥ.
- Pārthasārathimiśra; Vaidyanātha; P. N. Pattabhirama Sastri (1981). Śāstradīpikā, prabhāsahitā. Śrī Lālabhāduraśāstrikendriyasaṃskr̥tavidyāpīṭham.
- Karka; Maṇḍana Miśra; P. N. Pattabhirama Sastri (1982). Kātyāyanaśrautasūtraṃ: Karkabhāṣyasahitam. Śrīlālabahāduraśāstrikendriyasaṃskr̥tavidyāp̄īṭham.
- Kamalākarabhaṭṭa; P. N. Pattabhirama Sastri (1986). Mīmāṃsāśāstramālā. Veda-Mīmāṃsānusandhānakendram.
- Kamalākarabhaṭṭa; P. N. Pattabhirama Sastri (1987). Kamalākarabhaṭṭaviracitaṃ Mīmāṃsākutūhalam: prakaraṇagranthaḥ. Prakāśanādhikārī, Sampūrṇānandasaṃskr̥taviśvavidyālayasya.
- Sāyana; A. Cinnasvāmiśāstrī; P. N. Pattabhirama Sastri (1987). Sāmavedīyatāṇḍyamahābrāhmaṇam: Sāyaṇācāryaviracitabhāṣyasahitam. Caukhambhā Saṃskr̥ta Saṃsthāna.
- A. Cinnasvāmiśāstrī; P. N. Pattabhirama Sastri (1992). Yajñatattvaprakāśaḥ. Motīlāla Banārasīdāsa. ISBN 9788120827011.
- Bhavadeva; A. Cinnasvāmiśāstrī; P. N. Pattabhirama Sastri (1999). Tautātitamatatilaka. Sampūrṇānanda Saṃskr̥ta Viśvavidyālaye.
- Mādhava; P. N. Pattabhirama Sastri (1991). Jaiminīyanyāyamālāyāh ̣t{u0072}tīyādhyāyānto bhāgah ̣. Caukhambhā Saṃsk{u0072}ta Saṃsthāna.

== See also ==
- Sanskrit literature
- Vedas
- Mīmāṃsā
- hermenutics
- Rashtriya Sanskrit Vidyapeetha
