= Avinash Sharma =

New Zealand cricketer (born 1981)

Personal information
- Full name: Avinash Sunil Sharma
- Born: 15 September 1981 (age 45); Whangārei, Northland, New Zealand
- Batting: Right-handed
- Bowling: Right-arm medium

Domestic team information
- Years: Team
- 2010: Oxford University

Career statistics
Competition	First-class
Matches	1
Runs scored	185
Batting average	–
100s/50s	1/–
Top score	185*
Catches/stumpings	2/–
- Source: Cricinfo, 2 January 2022

Avinash Sunil Sharma (born 15 September 1981 in Whangārei, New Zealand), made his first class debut for Oxford University cricket team in 2010, scoring 185 not out in the Varsity Match, the oldest first class fixture in cricket, dating back to 1827. He is the brother of former Oxford cricket captain Rajiv Sharma.

Avinash Sharma holds the record for the highest ever score on first class debut in the Varsity match. This is also the highest ever score on debut by a New Zealander in a first class cricket match.

Sharma was a William Georgetti Scholar.
