= Sadat Abul Masud =

Syed Sadat Abul Masud
- Born: 19 February 1915; Ajangachhi Howrah British India (now Howrah) India
- Died: 3 January 1991 (aged 75); Kolkata, India
- Occupation: Justice of law
- Spouse: Tahera Masud
- Children: Syed Sadat Abul Masum, Syeda Asiya Kabir, Syed Sadat Abul Murshed
- Awards: Padma Bhushan; Friends of Liberation War Honour

Syed Sadat Abul Masud (19 February 1915 – 3 January 1991) was a former judge of Kolkata High Court in India. He was one of the four members of the 6th Finance Commission of India set up by the Government of India in 1972, under the chairmanship of Kasu Brahmananda Reddy, for advising on the Centre-State finance allocations. In March 2012, when Bangladesh decided to honour the friends of the country who assisted them in the Bangladesh Liberation War of 1971, he was one among the recipients of the Friends of Liberation War Honour. The Government of India awarded him the third highest civilian honour of the Padma Bhushan, in 1985, for his contributions to society.
