= Rajiv Sharma =

New Zealand cricketer (born 1984)

Personal information
- Full name: Rajiv Sharma
- Born: 10 June 1984 (age 42); Auckland, New Zealand
- Height: 6 ft 2 in (1.88 m)
- Batting: Right-handed
- Bowling: Right-arm medium-fast
- Relatives: Avinash Sharma (brother)

Domestic team information
- Years: Team
- 2004-2008, 2013: Auckland A
- 2009–2012: Oxford University
- 2009–2012: Oxford MCCU
- FC debut: 11 April 2009 Oxford MCCU v Worcestershire
- Last FC: 24 June 2012 Oxford University v Cambridge University

Career statistics
Competition	First-class
Matches	12
Runs scored	518
Batting average	32.37
100s/50s	1/1
Top score	114
Balls bowled	1316
Wickets	15
Bowling average	39.46
5 wickets in innings	1
10 wickets in match	0
Best bowling	5/68
Catches/stumpings	4/–
- Source: , 6 September 2012

Rajiv Sharma (born 10 June 1984) is a New Zealand-born cricketer and former captain of the Oxford University cricket team. A right-handed batsman and right-arm medium-fast bowler, Sharma attended Auckland Grammar School before Oxford, and also played for the Auckland A team.
