= Richa (surname) =

Richa is a surname. Notable people with this surname include:

- Ana Richa (born 1966), Brazilian beach volleyball player
- Andréa W. Richa, Brazilian-American computer scientist
- Antonio Dominguez Richa (1932–2020), Panamanian politician
- Beto Richa (born 1965), Brazilian engineer and politician
- José Richa (1934–2003), Brazilian politician, namesake of José Richa Hydroelectric Plant
- Susana Richa de Torrijos (born 1924), Panamanian educator, essayist, and politician
- Ziad Richa (born 1967), Lebanese skeet shooter
