= Vishal Sharma =

Vishal Sharma may refer to:

- Vishal Sharma (Delhi cricketer) (born 1978), Indian cricketer
- Vishal Sharma (Hyderabad cricketer) (born 1987), Indian cricketer
- Vishal Sharma (Railways cricketer) (born 1977), Indian cricketer
- Vishal O Sharma, Indian actor
- Vishal V. Sharma, Indian ambassador/permanent representative to UNESCO
