= R. S. Sharma =

R. S. Sharma may refer to:

- Ram Sharan Sharma (1919–2011), Indian historian
- Ram Sewak Sharma (born 1955), Indian bureaucrat and CEO of UIDAI
