= Rekha (disambiguation) =

Rekha (born 1954) is an Indian actress.

Rekha may also refer to:

- Rekha (given name), an Indian feminine given name
  - Rekha Harris (born 1970), Indian actress in Tamil and Malayalam cinema
  - Rekha (Kannada actress), Indian actress in Kannada cinema
- Rekha (1943 film), a Bollywood film
- Rekha (2023 film), an Indian Malayalam-language film
- Rekha: The Untold Story, a 2016 biography of the actress Rekha by Yasser Usman

== See also ==
- Surekha (disambiguation)
