= Gyanesh Sharma =

Indian politician

- Born: 28 February 1963 (age 63); Raipur, Madhya Pradesh, India (now in Chhattisgarh, India)
- Spouse: Asha Sharma
- Children: Suyash Sharma
- Parent(s): Parmeshwar Sharma (father); Sarojani Sharma(mother)

Gyanesh Sharma (born 28 February 1963) is the Chairman of Chhattisgarh Yog Aayog, also a senior Corporator from Thakur Pyarelal Ward 40 and Chairman of Public Works Department (PWD) in Raipur Municipal Corporation, and a senior spokesperson and senior leader of Chhattisgarh State Congress Committee, and was the Chairman of the Media Department in State Congress Committee of Chhattisgarh. He is also the Chairman of Vipra Arts, commerce & physical education college society.
