= Rajendra Prasad Sharma =

Indian police service officer

Member, Lokayukta, Odisha Dr. Rajendra Prasad Sharma IPS (Retd.)
- Born: 15 May 1960 (age 66); Ajmer, Rajasthan, India
- Education: M.B.B.S, L.L.B., Master Of Human
- Years active: 1986 - present
- Police career
- Country: India
- Department: Odisha Police
- Service years: 1986 - 2019
- Status: Member, Lokayukta, Odisha
- Badge no.: 19861024
- Awards: President's Police Medal for Distinguished Service (Republic Day, 2010); Indian Police Medal for Meritorious services (Republic Day, 2002)

Rajendra Prasad Sharma is a retired Odisha cadre IPS officer. He is the current Member of Lokayukta, Odisha. He was also the former Director General of Police of Odisha. He was also the former Director of Vigilance in the state of Odisha. Sharma is from Rajasthan.

== Education ==
Dr. Sharma holds numerous degrees that includes MBBS, LLB, M.A. in Human Rights, M.Phil. in National Security and Strategic Studies, Intermediate Certificate course in French language, Fellowship in HIV Medicine. He was pursuing his post graduate studies in Internal Medicine(M.D.) when he got selected into the Indian Police Service. . As a student leader, he was vice-president of All India Medical Students' Association in the year 1981–82.

== Career ==
Sharma was appointed to the IPS in 1986 and is a part of Odisha Cadre. He started his career as an ASP (under training) at Police Training College, Angul as well as Bhubaneswar before being posted as SDPO, Rayagada. He served as SP in Kalahandi, Berhampur, Dhenkanal and Balasore between 1990 and 2001. And served as Commissioner of Police in Bhubaneswar. He served as D.I.G. of Police, CID, Crime Branch and D.I.G. of Police, Central Range, Cuttack. On deputation to Govt. of India, he worked as Zonal Director, Narcotics Control Bureau at Jodhpur and effected seizures of a record quantity of illicit drugs with arrest of many international Drug Traffickers. He also worked as D.I.G of Police (Admn) and I.G. of Police (Hqrs) in National Security Guard (NSG), New Delhi and significantly contributed in the N.S.Gs expansion activities, post Mumbai terror attack. He has served in U.N. Peacekeeping Mission in Haiti, Central America. In his second stint with the United Nations, he worked as Anti Corruption and Crime Prevention Expert in the UNODC, Regional Office for South Asia at New Delhi. He is a member of INTERPOL Group of Experts on Police Training (IGEPT) since the year 2009, i.e. last four years. He prepared an Action Plan for prevention and control of HIV/AIDS in the Central Para Military Forces of India which was implemented from 2006 to 2009. He served as the Director General of Police of Odisha from 31 August 2017 to 8 August 2019. Now he is appointed as the Member of Lokayukta, Odisha.

== Awards ==
He is a recipient of President's Police Medal for Distinguished Service (January, 2010), Police Medal for Meritorious Service (January, 2002), U.N. Peacekeeping Medal (1997), Police Special Duty Medal (2012) and Commendation Disc of DG, NSG.
