= Pooja Sharma (social worker) =

Indian social worker (born 1996)

- Born: July 7, 1996 (age 29); Shahdara district, Delhi, India
- Occupation: Social worker
- Years active: 2022–present
- Known for: Cremating unclaimed bodies in Delhi

Pooja Sharma (born 7 July 1996) is an Indian social worker who since 2022 has performed funeral rites for unclaimed bodies in Delhi, for which she was named one of the BBC's 100 Women of 2024.

== Biography ==
Sharma was born into a middle class Hindu family in Shahdara, Delhi, India. She obtained a bachelor's degree and then a master's degree in social work, and worked as a HIV counsellor at a government hospital.

Sharma performed her first funeral rites following the death of her brother Rameshwar, who was shot and murdered on 12 March 2022. Following his death, Sharma's father fell into a coma, and there were no other male family members to perform funeral rites, prompting Sharma to do it herself. Following this, Sharma decided to leave her job and to perform funerals for unclaimed bodies of her home city of Delhi.

By 2024, Sharma had performed over 4000 funerals, primarily of migrant workers from other parts of India who have died in Delhi and whose next of kin are unknown. She collects unclaimed bodies from mortuaries and hospitals around Delhi and performs last rites for them including making a shroud and performing prayers. Sharma performs primarily Hindu funeral services but will do rites from other religions if the religion of the deceased person is known, including burying Muslims at Islamic cemeteries. Sharma performs an average of eight funerals a day. Monthly, Sharma collects the ashes of cremated bodies and transport them to Haridwar to scatter them in the Ganges during Amasvasya.

Sharma is not paid for performing funerals and estimated that it cost around 120, 000 INR a month; she received financial support from her grandmother and her father in addition to using her savings and selling her jewellery. In 2023, Sharma established a non-governmental organisation, Bright the Soul Foundation, that in addition to performing funeral rites for unclaimed bodies provides support to marginalised communities including abandoned children, the elderly, and the destitute.

Sharma has received resistance from priests and the community due to the taboo around women performing funeral rites; she reported being considered to be an aghori by some people, and her fiancé ended their engagement due to his family accusing Sharma of being a chandala. Sharma stated her interpretation of the Vedas did not prohibit women from performing funeral rites.

Sharma has 350, 000 followers on Instagram. In 2024, Sharma was named as one of the BBC's 100 Women for that year.
