= Reha Kutlu =

American journalist

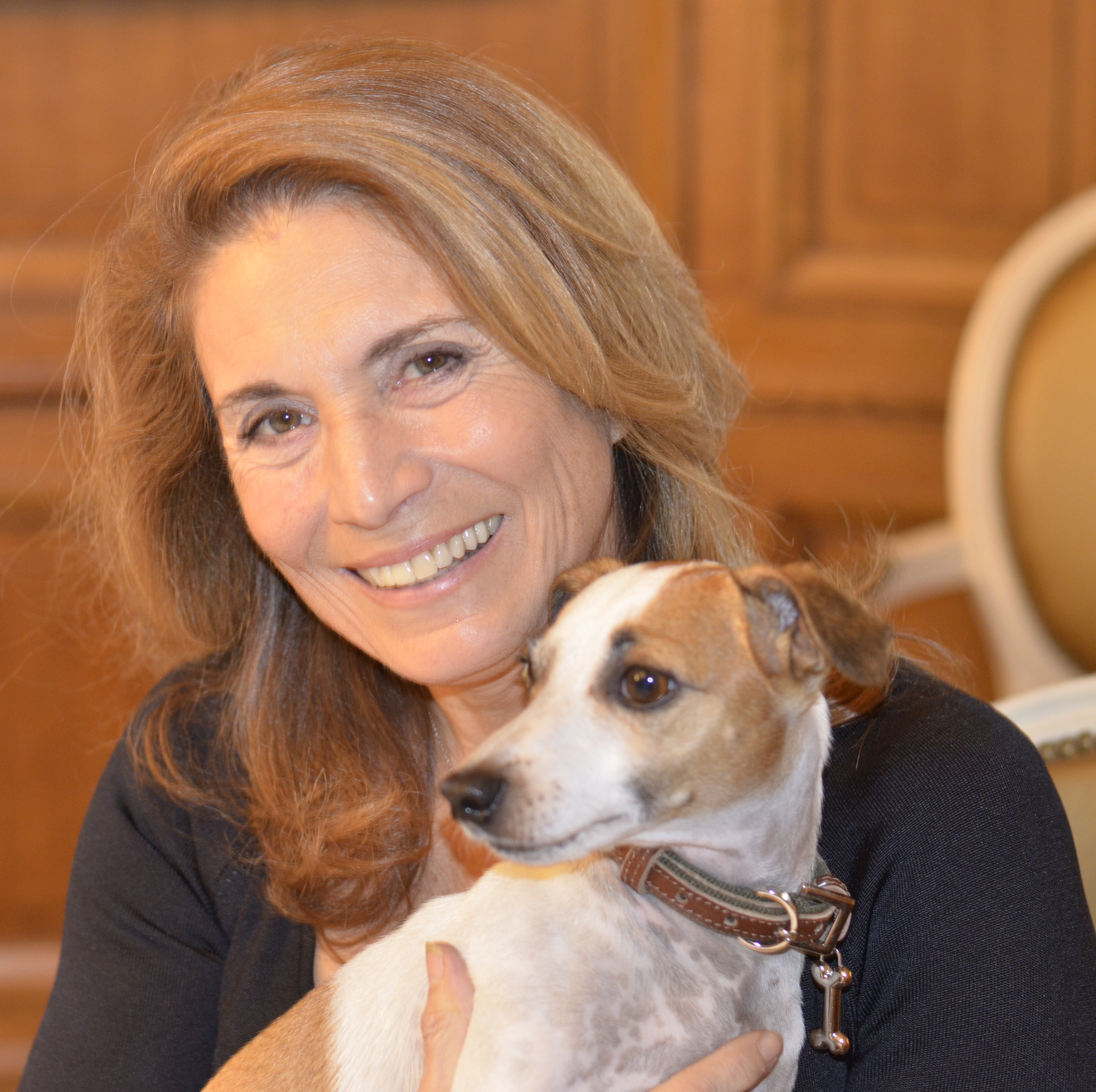
Reha Hutin in 2012

Reha Hutin (April 10, 1945; also known as Reha Hutin-Kutlu) is a Turkish-French producer and journalist. She is president of the 30 Million Friends Foundation, and head of the editorial board of 30 millions d'amis magazine.

== Life ==
She studied at Chatelard School, and the University of Geneva. From 1977 to 1989, she wrote for the television program "L'Avenir du futur", a science program, broadcast on TF1, with her husband Jean-Pierre Hutin.

In March 1978, they launched the magazine "30 Millions Amis".
