= Metris Prison =

Prison in Turkey

Metris Penitentiary
- location of district of Esenler, in which the prison is located, within Istanbul

- Location in Istanbul
- Location: Esenler, Istanbul; 41.07875°N 28.87524°E
- Status: Operational
- Security class: T-type
- Opened: 1981
- Managed by: Directorate General of Penitentiaries, Ministry of Justice
- Director: Zeki Uzun
- Website: www.metristcik.adalet.gov.tr/index.html

Metris Prison (Turkish: Metris Cezaevi), or officially Metris Closed Penitentiary (Turkish: Metris Kapalı Ceza İnfaz Kurumu) is a state correctional institution in the Esenler district of Istanbul Province in Turkey. The prison complex consists of two T-type buildings. The current prison director is Zeki Uzun.

== Location ==
The Metris prison is situated in the Havaalanı neighborhood on the Eskiedirne Asfaltı (literally: Old Edirne Road). The complex is built on 32,000 m^{2} (340,000 sq ft) ground covering an area of 50,000 m^{2} (540,000 sq ft).

== History ==
The facility was established by the Ministry of National Defence and opened on April 17, 1981, for use as the Metris Military Prison during the martial law era following the 1980 coup d'état. It was transferred to the Ministry of Justice on August 1, 1988. Since then, it serves as the Metris Closed Penitentiary subordinated to the Bakırköy District Court. On March 18, 2007, the second T-type prison building entered service, and all detainees and convicts of the closed H-type prison were transferred to the new building. Another T-type prison building, the Prison #1, opened on May 31, 2008.

== Mass prison break ==
Twenty-nine inmates escaped from the prison in the early hours of March 25, 1988, as it was still being administered by the military. Of the escapees, eleven were sentenced to the death penalty and eight to life imprisonment. They were all members of illegal extreme left-wing organizations, such as 19 members of the armed wing of the Communist Party of Turkey/Marxist–Leninist (TİKKO) – considered as extremely dangerous – three members of the Revolutionary Communist Party of Turkey (TDKP/HK), one member of the Turkish Liberation Front (THKP/C), one member of the Revolutionary Left (Dev-Sol), and five members of the Revolutionary Path (Dev-Yol).

The mass prison break took place through a 60 m (200 ft)-long secret tunnel, which was built in six months. The tunnel was dug up manually with spoons, and the extracted soil was dumped into the sewage system.

== Notable inmates ==
- İbrahim Akın (born 1984), footballer. Detained for match-fixing allegations.
- Korcan Çelikay (born 1987), footballer. Detained for match-fixing allegations.
- Tayfur Havutçu (born 1970), football coach, retired footballer. Detained for match-fixing allegations.
- Reha İsvan, journalist, for her role as vice president of the Peace Association
- Ümit Karan (born 1976), retired footballer. Detained for match-fixing allegations.
- Haluk Levent (born 1968), rock music singer. Convicted for check kiting.
- Bülent Uygun (born 1971), football coach, former footballer. Detained for match-fixing allegations.
- Aziz Yıldırım (born 1952), businessman and chairman of the multi sport club Fenerbahçe S.K. Detained for one year due to match-fixing allegations.
- Hüseyin Yıldırım (born 1928), Cold War-era spy sentenced to life imprisonment in the United States. Extradited to Turkey and incarcerated for one day only.
