= Reha İsvan =

Turkish author, journalist and political activist (1925–2013)

- Born: 1925; Istanbul, Turkey
- Died: 8 May 2013 (aged 87–88); Yalova, Turkey
- Resting place: Taşköprü, Yalova, Turkey
- Education: Ankara University
- Occupation: Journalist
- Spouse: Ahmet İsvan
- Children: 3

Reha İsvan (1925 – 2013) was a Turkish author, journalist and political activist. She has been known for her post as the vice president of the Turkish Peace Association. She was imprisoned more than three years between February 1982 and February 1986 due to her activities at the association.

== Early life and education ==
She was born in Şehremini, Istanbul, in 1925. Her father was an army officer who accompanied Mustafa Kemal in his journey to Samsun in May 1919.

She graduated from Arnavutköy Girls' High School and received a degree from the Agriculture School in Ankara.

== Career and activities ==
Following her graduation she worked at an agriculture company for a short time and then contributed to a newspaper entitled Çağdaş (Turkish: Contemporary). İsvan also worked for various periodicals. She became the vice president of the Peace Association which was established on 4 April 1977. The association was headed by Mahmut Dikerdem and was closed shortly before the military coup on 12 September 1980. She was arrested and jailed in the Metris military prison, Istanbul, on 26 February 1982. She remained in prison until 17 February 1986 without a conviction. Then she and her husband settled in Taşköprü where they involved in agricultural activities at their farm.

İsvan published a book entitled Gün Olur Devran Döner (Turkish: Every Cloud has a Silver Lining). Zeynep Oral published Reha İsvan's memoir which focused on her imprisonment.

== Personal life and death ==
Her husband was Ahmet İsvan, a social democrat politician. They married in 1950 and had three children. She died in Yalova on 8 May 2013. Her funeral prayers were performed at the Levent Mosque, Istanbul, and she was buried in Taşköprü, Yalova.
