= Laxmi Sharma =

Nepali entrepreneur

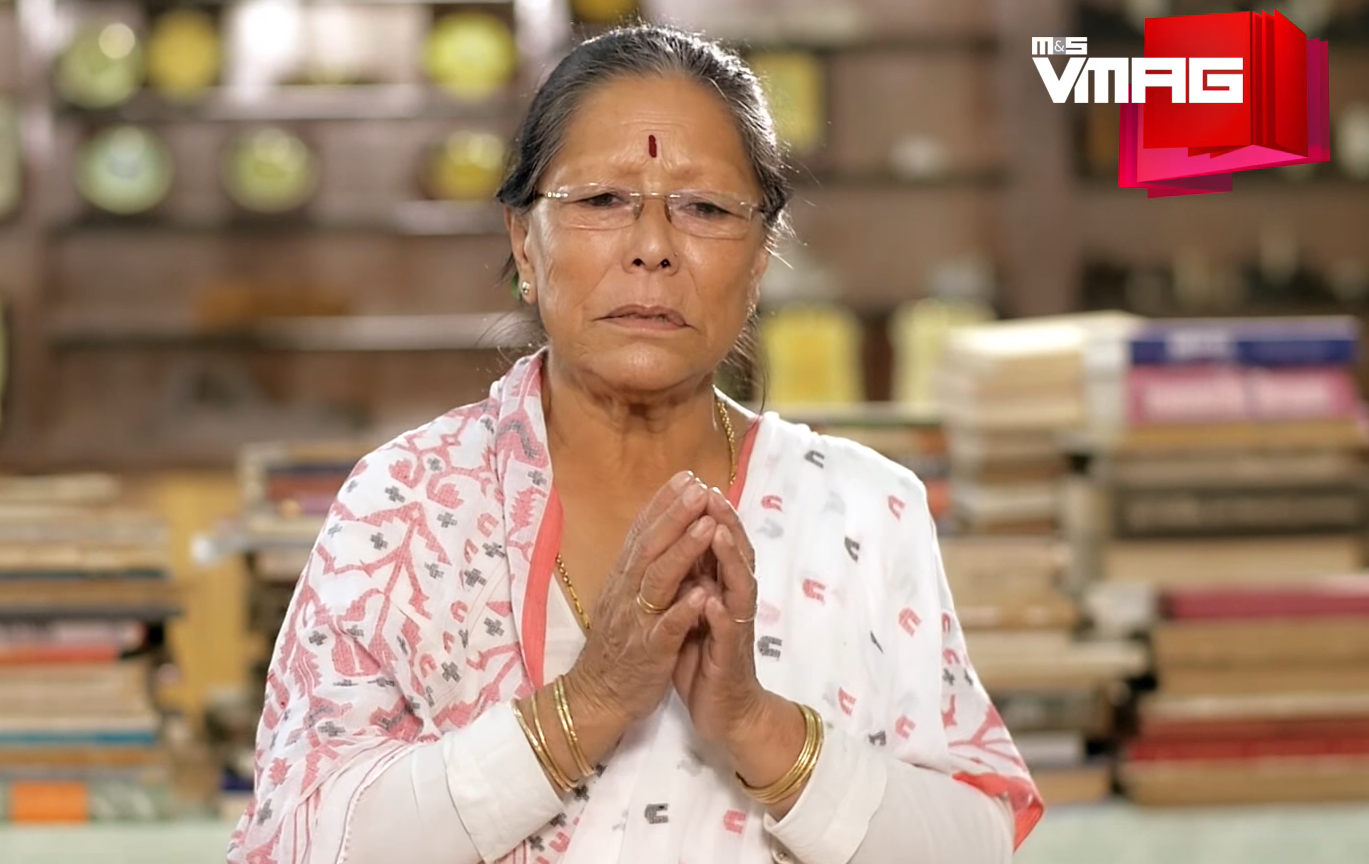
- Sharma in 2017.
- Born: Kathmandu, Nepal
- Known for: Being the first women to drive an auto rickshaw.

Laxmi Sharma (Nepali: लक्ष्मी शर्मा) is a Nepali entrepreneur. She is credited as the first woman to drive an auto-rickshaw and went on to establish the first button factory in Nepal. Sharma was married at a young age, after getting a divorce she worked as a housemaid for sixteen years. Later, she started to drive a rickshaw. Though she was harassed for being a woman driver, she went on to open Laxmi Wood Craft Udhyog, a company that made buttons. The buttons were exported to Germany, Switzerland, Zambia, Denmark and the USA.

== Personal life ==
Sharma worked at the royal palace where she had to pick flowers during Puja, after that, she had to clean the room and spent time with the princess. Sharma received about 20 Nepalese rupees a month. After the queen died, she had to adjust at home. She said: "It was difficult for me as a kid to adjust to such drastic lifestyle changes—from living in a palace, where people took care of me, to going back home, where I had to learn to cook and clean".

At the age of 13, Sharma got married, with her husband she had three daughters. At an early age she was not ready but she was forced to have a child. She lost her first child as she was "not physically, or mentally, ready to mother a child". She describes the process as "emotionally traumatising". After fourteen years of marriage, they had a divorce because she was being disrespected by him. She also didn't want her children to grow in a disrespectful environment. To provide for her children, she worked as a housemaid for about 16 years.

== Career ==
In 1981, Sharma bought an auto-rickshaw (Tempo) for about 10,000 Nepalese rupees (approximately US$80 in 1981) which she borrowed from her family members. She also hired a man to operate the tempo. Sharma took training as a mechanic, studying for six months in Nepal and eight months in all of India. Since she wasn't making any profits from the tempo, she decided to drive the tempo. She drove the Tempo for about four years without a license, unaware that she needed one. She is credited as the first women to drive an auto-rickshaw. Sharma later revealed that she was being insulted and harassed by her community for driving the tempo. She added: "Men harassed her — making sexual innuendos, pulling her hair, even trying to touch her. Sometimes even female passengers refused to pay the fare because, as a woman, she posed no threat". She later started to make 100 rupees a day (US$0.80 in 2020). Furthermore, she bought five tempos.

Two years later, after quitting driving, she opened Laxmi Wood Craft Udhyog, a button factory. It was the first button factory in Nepal. She hired four people to work in the factory. They made the buttons from "bones and horns of animals, particularly buffalos". Her buttons were exported to Germany, Switzerland, Zambia, Denmark and the USA. She describes the sales as "they started selling like hot cakes" but not initially she remembers "haranguing tales of physical abuse when having gone to collect fruits of her labor". The buttons are imported by major companies including Ralph Lauren and Zara. The company has made about fifteen thousand designs of buttons. Sharma had spent a lot of time in the library where she taught herself about "European art and craft and the equipment used".

== Accolades ==
Year	Award	Category	Result	Ref(s)
1999	Title of "The First Female Tempo Driver of Nepal"	—	Honoured	
