= Deepak Sharma =

Deepak Sharma may refer to:

- Deepak Sharma (cricketer, born 1960), Indian cricketer
- Deepak Sharma (cricketer, born 1984), Indian cricketer
- Deepak Sharma (director) (born 1975), Indian television director
- Deepak Sharma (writer) (born 1946), Indian writer
- Deepak Sharma (soldier) (1983–2010), Indian soldier posthumously awarded the Kirti Chakra
