= Sunil Kumar Sharma =

Sunil Kumar Sharma may refer to:

- Sunil Kumar Sharma (Jammu and Kashmir), Indian politician
- Sunil Kumar Sharma (Uttar Pradesh), Indian politician
- Sunil Kumar Sharma (Nepalese politician) (born 1978)
