= Anil Sharma =

Anil Sharma may refer to:

- Anil Sharma (director) (born 1960), Indian film director and producer
- Anil Sharma (Himachal Pradesh politician) (born 1956), Indian politician, member of the Himachal Pradesh Legislative Assembly
- Anil Sharma (Uttar Pradesh politician) (1963–2026), Indian politician, member of the Uttar Pradesh Legislative Assembly
- Anil Kumar Sharma (Delhi politician) (born 1971), Indian politician, member of the Delhi Legislative Assembly
- Anil Kumar Sharma (Rajasthan politician) (born 1970), Indian politician, member of the Rajasthan Legislative Assembly from the Sardarshahar constituency
- Anil Sharma (Indian Airlines Flight 814), steward and survivor of the Indian Airlines flight 814 hijacking
- Dr. Anil Kumar Sharma (Assistant Director, TV & Radio) at Communication Centre of Punjab Agricultural University, Ludhiana
