= Suresh Shankar Nadkarni =

- Born: August 22, 1934; Mumbai, India
- Died: January 31, 1995; Delhi, India
- Occupations: Banker; Corporate executive
- Known for: Banking and securities
- Spouse: Sulabha Nadkarni
- Children: Rajeev Nadkarni and Sanjeev Nadkarni
- Awards: Padma Bhushan; Goa World Man of the Year Award

Suresh Shankar Nadkarni (1934–1995) was an Indian banker, corporate executive and the chairman of the Securities and Exchange Board of India (SEBI).

Prior to his assignment with SEBI, he headed the Industrial Credit and Investment Corporation of India (ICICI) and the Industrial Development Bank of India (IDBI). He was also serving as a director of the Life Insurance Corporation of India (LIC) from 1993. He was credited with efforts in streamlining the Indian securities market and in introducing measures to prevent illegal trading of stocks, including forward trading.

Together with Ravi Narain, RH Patil and others, he helped create the blueprint for the National Stock Exchange of India Limited (NSE) in 1992.

He died on 31 January 1995, at the age of 60, succumbing to a heart attack.

== Achievements ==
The Government of India awarded him the third highest civilian honour, the Padma Bhushan, in 1989, for his contributions to society, making him the first banker so honoured.

In 1992, he was chosen as the Goa World Man of the Year by Goa Today Magazine.
