= Sanjay Sharma (serial killer) =

Convicted Indian serial killer

- Born: 1969 (age 56–57); New Delhi, India
- Other names: Juan Carlos Sánchez Pinto (Clasen); Alexander López; James Kennedy
- Conviction: Murder x3
- Penalty: Life imprisonment

Details
- Victims: 3 (two convictions)
- Span of crimes: 1997–1999
- Country: Austria, Denmark
- States: Tyrol, Southern Denmark
- Date apprehended: 18 May 2000

Sanjay Sharma (born 1969), also known as Juan Carlos Sánchez Pinto Clasen among other false identities, is an Indian serial killer currently serving a life sentence in Denmark for the double murder of his wife and her child in 1999, which he committed while on the run from Indian police, who were planning to charge him with the murder of his second wife in Austria two years prior.

== Early life and first marriage ==
Sanjay Sharma was born in 1969 in New Delhi, India, the younger of two boys in a family with four children. When he was five years old, his older brother, Anil, whom he looked up to, was sent to a boarding school. In adulthood Anil moved to the United States, where he began a career as a businessman in New York City. Sharma dropped out of school shortly afterwards and moved to the city in search of financial opportunities, first living with his brother and then with friends. In order to earn an income, he took on jobs at an electronic store and then a grocery store, for which he was described as a hard worker by Anil. While residing in New York City, Sanjay met 20-year-old Ecuadorian national Cecilia Mantuano, with whom he began a romantic relationship.

In 1992, the couple were married, and a year later, Mantuano gave birth to a son, Alexander, at Queens Hospital Center. The marriage deteriorated after Alexander's birth due to threats Sharma allegedly made to Mantuano, which resulted in Mantuano seeking a restraining order. Sharma fled back to India without officially divorcing his wife, and decided to remain in the country and keep a low profile. During his frequent flights between New Delhi and Mumbai, he became acquainted with 23-year-old Razi Singh, a flight attendant for Jet Airways.

== Second marriage and first murder ==
Despite the disapproval of her family, Singh began dating Sharma, who presented himself as an officer working in the New York City Police Department. While he acted courteous and friendly towards the Singh family, they treated him with suspicion and forbade him from marrying their daughter. Without the family's knowledge, Sharma and Razi married at a New Delhi temple on 8 July 1997. Not long after, Sharma started to act violently towards his new wife, handcuffing her to the bed, forbidding her to talk to her parents and monitoring her phone calls. He also demanded that Razi's family give him a car, a new house and a dowry worth 1,000,000 rupees, something they refused to do, as they were both unable and unwilling to pay that sum. Angered by their refusal, about a month after their wedding, Sharma burned down the family's house and a neighbouring restaurant, shortly after threatening his father-in-law Sanwal with a hammer. In response, Sanwal called the police, who promptly arrested Sharma and charged him with illegal possession of a weapon after they found that he was also carrying a handgun.

While he was detained for a week, Razi Singh returned to her parents. While looking through her husband's passport, she discovered that he was married to another woman back in the States. She wrote a letter to Mantuano and to the local police, pressing for further information about Sharma, but did not receive a reply before his release on bail. He picked up his wife and brought her to his mother's home in Rohini, Delhi, where he allegedly began sedating her to keep her from escaping. On 24 November 1997, Sharma took out an insurance policy on his wife worth $50,000 from the United India Insurance Company, whereupon he booked two tickets bound for Austria. The couple landed in Innsbruck Airport on the evening of 30 November and travelled to Absam, where Sharma's sister and brother-in-law lived. The next few days, the couple went on excursions and shopping sprees. On 4 December, while they were alone in the house, Razi decided to take a bath. About an hour and a half later, she was found dead in the bathtub with a submerged hair dryer.

Despite Sharma having a weak alibi, an Austrian coroner declared that the Razi had died from electric shock, but still considered the death worthy of further investigation. An inquiry by local authorities determined that the death was an accident, but was unable to explain why and how the hair dryer had been put in the bathtub. The Criminal Investigation_Department of India, which were aware of the couple's strained relationship, and started their own inquiry into the matter. While Sharma managed to cremate his wife's body in Austria, he was allowed to transport the ashes in an urn back to her home in New Delhi. He claimed to have lost the urn during the trip back home, claiming that the bag he had carried the urn in had been stolen. This claim was disputed by both Singh's family members and police, who arrested him on 20 December and charged him with murder.

== Escape to Denmark and third marriage ==
Sharma spent a year and a half in custody while awaiting his trial. On 20 March 1999, after a court hearing in New Delhi, he bribed two police officers to drive him to his mother's house, from where he fled India. After his brother called the police and told them Sharma had attempted to contact him, he was declared a fugitive, with his photographs plastered on newspapers and showcased on India's Most Wanted. Between March and August 1999, Sharma, using the fake names of "Alexander López" and "James Kennedy", travelled between numerous countries, including Bangladesh, Thailand, Hong Kong, Jamaica, Costa Rica, Brazil, Germany and Austria. On 27 August 1999, he arrived in Greenland, where he presented himself as a Venezuelan citizen by the name of Juan Carlos Sánchez Pinto. Upon arriving at the airport, he befriended two local men who allowed him to temporarily stay at their apartment in Nuuk.

After residing with the men for a few days, Sharma met 23-year-old Carla Clasen, a divorcée who sold clothes in front of the Brugsen supermarket. She lived alone with her 2-year-old daughter, Natuk. Not long after their meeting, Clasen and Sharma, under his alias Sánchez Pinto, began a romantic relationship. Fourteen days after first metting, they were married. A day after their wedding, marital issues emerged. Sharma would frequently leave home for many hours at a time, allegedly to have sexual intercourse with two gay men in Nuuk. There were also rumours that he had engaged in hashish smuggling, and that the reason why he had married Carla was to get another surname and make her a courier. A few weeks later, Sharma travelled to Esbjerg, where he bought an apartment in Kvanglundparken. Less than two weeks later, Carla and Natuk moved in with him, and the family remained there for some time.

== Double murder and flight ==
On 9 October 1999, Sharma rented the "Bacchus" holiday home in Fanø, to where he travelled together with Carla and Natuk, ostensibly to have a relaxing family vacation. Three days later, Sharma booked a one-way ticket to Ottawa, Canada and left without his wife or his adopted child. He never reported either of them missing, and the mysterious disappearances raised suspicion, but when queried about them, Sharma claimed that they were in Venezuela. On 8 February 2000, police were called to the cottage when a neighbour reported that he had seen a child's arm sticking out of the sand, near a slope. The authorities dug up the body, which was quickly identified as that of Natuk Clasen, while her mother's corpse was found buried in a nearby toolshed. A forensic autopsy concluded that Carla had suffered multiple injuries to the head, while Natuk, who was found with sand in her mouth, had likely been suffocated to death. Sharma, or Sánchez Pinto Clasen as he was known to Danish police, was officially charged with the murders and declared an international fugitive via Interpol.

== Arrest and trial ==
Initially, it was believed that Sharma was hiding in Copenhagen, where he had acquaintances. In actuality, Sharma was laying low in Long Island, where he had applied for a taxi driver's licence. Unbeknownst to him, ever since his arrival from Canada, he had been monitored by the FBI, who suspected him of residing in the country illegally. On 18 May 2000, he was arrested in front of a bank in Brooklyn without incident and driven to a local police station, where he admitted that he was being sought by the Danish authorities for a double homicide, but denied being the actual culprit.

He voluntarily waived his right to a hearing and was extradited back to Denmark, where he was charged with the murders of Carla Clasen and Natuk. Approximately one month later, in June 2000, while he was still in custody, Sharma attempted to escape by setting fire to a cupboard in his cell, causing the entire prison block to be evacuated. The attempt failed, and following that incident, he was placed in maximum security detention in Horsens, as authorities feared he might take hostages or other violent actions against other inmates.

During the course of the trial, witness testimony from friends and acquaintances of both Sharma and Clasen revealed that the former had no love interest in the latter, as less than two hours after his wedding, Sharma had attempted to apply for residency and a work permit. In addition, two of Sharma's gay lovers, Torben and Jan Kvik, confirmed that on that same wedding night, they had a threesome with Sharma which was recorded on video, and that he had called his wife a "big fat cow" on several occasions.

Despite Sanjay Sharma's claims of innocence and criticisms that the Danish police hadn't done a proper investigation, a 12-member jury panel found him guilty of both murders, and he was subsequently convicted, receiving the mandatory sentence of life imprisonment.

== Imprisonment ==
Shortly after his conviction, Sharma appealed his sentence to the Supreme Court, which upheld the verdict in November 2001. Since 2012, he has been eligible for parole, but has thus far not been approved for it. In 2005, Sharma's new girlfriend, Ketty Andersen, made an interview with Ekstra Bladet where she asserted her belief that he was a scapegoat. She also claimed she would fight for his release, and if that ever happened, they would marry and move to Sweden.

== See also ==
- List of serial killers by country
