= Archana Sharma (botanist) =

Indian geneticist (1932-2008)

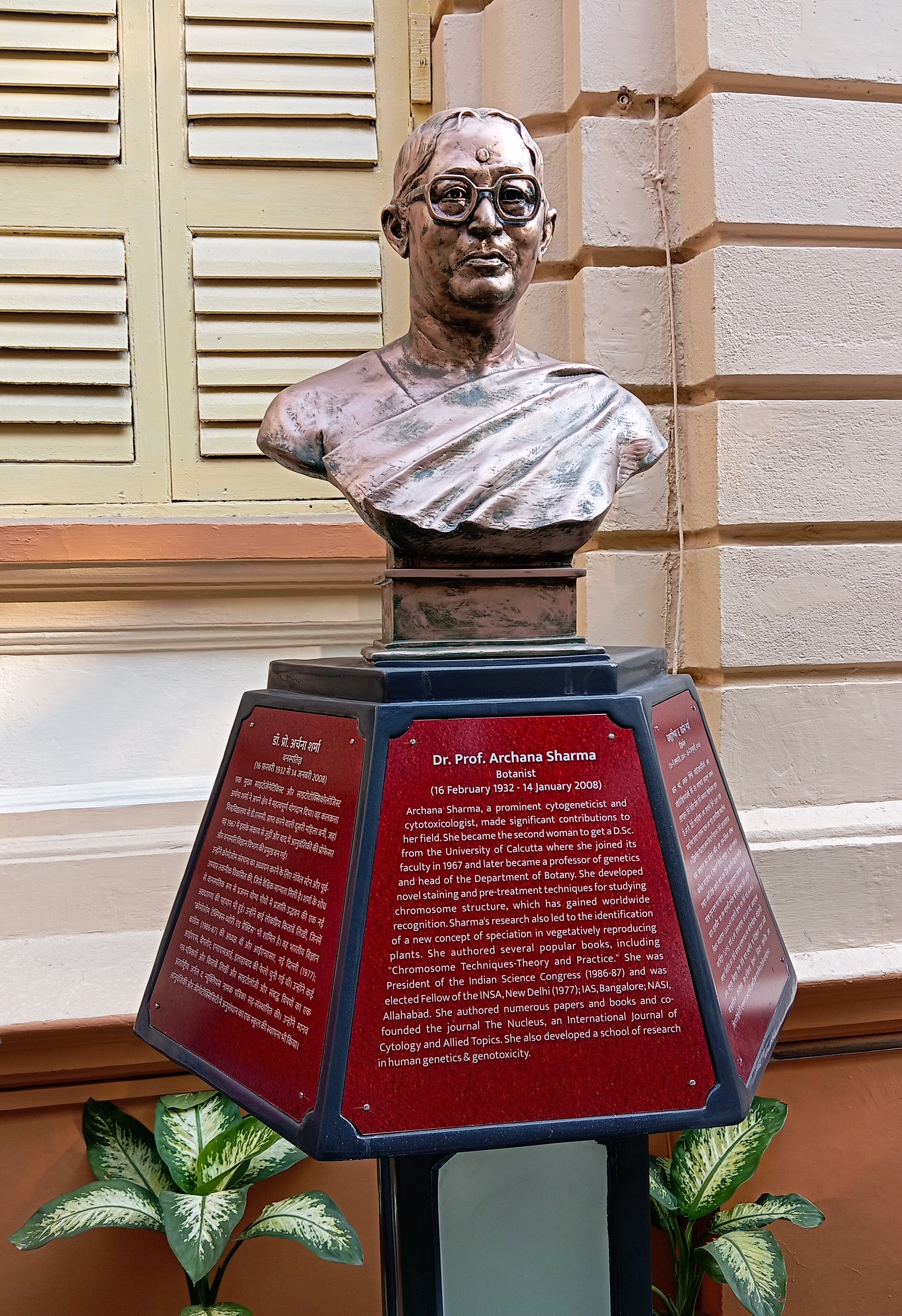
- Statue of Archana Sharma inside Birla Industrial & Technological Museum campus, Kolkata, West Bengal, India
- Born: 16 February 1932; Pune, Maharashtra, India
- Died: 14 January 2008 (aged 75); Kolkata, West Bengal, India
- Occupation: Botanist · Cytogeneticist · Cell biologist · Cytotechnologist
- Spouse: Arun Kumar Sharma

Archana Sharma was an Indian botanist, cytogeneticist, cell biologist, and cytotoxicologist. Her widely recognized contributions include the study of speciation in vegetatively reproducing plants, induction of cell division in adult nuclei, the cause of polyteny in differentiated tissues in plants, cytotaxonomy of flowering plants, and the effect of arsenic in water.

== Early life and education ==
Archana Sharma was born on 16 February 1932 in Pune to a family of academicians, including Professor N.P. Mookherjee, a professor of chemistry at Bikaner. Her early education was in Rajasthan. She then went on to do her B.Sc. from Bikaner and later pursued her M.Sc. in the Department of Botany at the University of Calcutta in 1951. Sharma completed her Ph.D. in 1955 and D.Sc. in 1960, specialising in Cytogenetics, Human Genetics and Environmental Mutagenesis. As a result, she became the second woman to have been awarded a D.Sc. by the University of Calcutta.

== Career ==
In 1967, Sharma joined the University of Calcutta as faculty, later becoming a professor of genetics in 1972 in the Centre of Advanced Studies in Cell and Chromosome Research at University of Calcutta. In 1981, she was promoted to Head of the Department of Botany, succeeding Prof. A.K.Sharma until 1983.

During her academic career, she supervised over 70 Ph.D. students in the areas of cytogenetics, human genetics, and environmental mutagenesis.

Sharma's research led to breakthroughs in botanical science. Among her notable findings are topics related to speciation in vegetatively reproducing plants, induction of cell division in adult nuclei, the cause of polyteny in differentiated tissues in plants, cytotaxonomy of flowering plants, and the effect of arsenic in water. Her research and findings on chromosomal study on flowering plants led to a new set of perceptions on their classification. Sharma also worked extensively in human genetics, specifically genetic polymorphism in normal human populations.

Sharma was a member of organizations such as the University Grants Commission, National Commission for Women, Science and Engineering Research Council, Department of Environment, Overseas Scientific Advisory Committee, among various others. Sharma also served as chairperson on the Task Force on Integrated Manpower Development of the Department of Biotechnology.

Sharma was actively involved with prominent policy-making bodies, including Science and Engineering Research Council of the Department of Science and Technology, Government of India; Environmental Research Council of the Ministry of Environment and Forests, Government of India; the Panel for Co-operation with UNESCO, the Ministry of Human Resource Development, Government of India; and various technical committees of University Grants Commission, Department of Science and Technology, and the Department of Biotechnology.

== Publications ==
During her career, Sharma published 10 books and between 300 and 400 research papers. She published the book Chromosome Techniques - Theory and Practice in 1965 with her husband, fellow professor Arun Kumar Sharma. She was also the founder of Nucleus, an international journal of cytology and allied topics, and continued to be its editor until 2007. She served on the Editorial boards of Indian Journal of Experimental Biology, Proceedings of the Indian National Science Academy.

Sharma also edited multiple scientific volumes for publishers such as CRC Press, Oxford, IBH, Kluwer Academic (Netherlands), and Gordon and Beach UK.

== Personal life ==
Sharma was married to Arun Kumar Sharma, considered by many as the Father of Indian Cytology.

She died on January 14, 2008.

== Awards ==
- G.P. Chatterjee Award, 1995
- S.G. Sinha Award, 1995
- Padma Bhushan (third-highest civilian award by the President of the India), 1984
- Birbal Sahni Medal, 1984
- FICCI Award, 1983
- Fellowship at Indian Academy of Sciences, 1977
- Shanti Swarup Bhatnagar Prize, 1975
- J.C. Bose Award, 1972

== See also ==
- Timeline of women in science
