= Richa =

Sanskrit term for a Vedic verse

Richa (Sanskrit: ऋच, romanized: Ṛca), also rendered rucha, refers to a mantra, usually one in line, found in the Sanskrit religious scriptures, the Vedas. It is a term used to refer to each verse of the Rigveda.

== Etymology ==
The etymological origin of the richa is the Sanskrit word Ṛc (ऋच्), which means to praise. Richa, is therefore, one ṛc after the other. Other meanings of ṛc are splendor, worship, or a hymn. Richa can also refer to a verbal composition of celestial sounds called shrutis; the Gayatri Mantra is a rucha as well.

== Literature ==
=== Rigveda ===
In the Rigveda, the richa refers to individual verses, which are collected into a sukta, translated as a hymn. The suktas are combined into the 10 mandalas, the books of the Rigveda. For example, the famous Purusha sukta has 16 richas. It is the 90th sukta of the 10th mandala of the Rigveda. The Rigveda contains about 10,600 richas, organised into 191 suktas. The other three Vedas use a similar terminology.

One of the richas is composed in praise of the dawn:

The radiant dawns have risen up for glory, in their white
splendour in the waves of water.
She makes paths all easy, fair to travel, and rich, has shown
herself benign and friendly

— Rigveda

Another richa is composed in praise of the night:

The darkness she produces; soon advancing
She calls her sister morning to return,
And then each darksome shadow melts away.
Kind goddess, be propitious to thy servants
who at thy coming straightaway seek repose,
Like birds who nightly nestle in the trees

— Rigveda
