= Jhabarmal Sharma =

Journalist and historian (1888–1983)

Jhabarmal Sharma was a noted journalist and historian of Rajasthan state in India. He was a recipient of the Maharana Mewar award. He wrote several books in Hindi on history. He received the Padma Bhushan in 1982.

His works include Guleri Granthawali (three volumes) and Sikar Ka Ithias.

In commemoration of Jhabarmal Sharma, a memorial lecture is organised by the Rajasthan Patrika and Makhanlal Chaturvedi National University of Journalism and Communication, Bhopal. The "Pandit Jhabarmal Sharma Journalism Award’’ is given by the Jhabarmal Sharma Museum and Journalism Research Centre, of Jaipur.

To recognize his contribution for Hindi Literature a falicitation book "Pt. Jhabar Mal Sharma Abhinandan Granth" was published in his honour in 1977 by Rajasthan Manch.
