= Sanjay Sharma (ophthalmologist) =

Canadian ophthalmologist and medical researcher

- Born: 1967 (age 58–59)
- Education: Dalhousie University, Queen's University.
- Occupations: Eye physician and surgeon, Professor.
- Known for: Ophthalmology, Epidemiology, Founder of MEDSKL.

Sanjay Sharma (born 1967) is a Canadian ophthalmologist, epidemiologist, and Professor of ophthalmology and epidemiology at Queen's University. He currently serves as head of the retina service at Hotel Dieu Hospital. Sharma is known for developing MEDSKL, a free open access medical education (FOAMed) initiative, for medical students that is promoted through the Canadian Federation of Medical Students (CFMS) and used by medical students in more than 50 universities. As a result, the Association of Faculties of Medicine of Canada (AFMC) granted him the John Reudy award for innovation in medical education in 2017. He also received the Ontario Medical Association achievement award 2012 - Innovation in the field of Ophthalmology, an American academy of ophthalmology achievement award (2004) and the Ron Michaels Foundation award (1998).

== Career ==
Sharma is an eye physician, a surgeon and a medical retina specialist whose main areas of research are macular degeneration. Sharma is also an ophthalmologist and retina specialist at the Hotel Dieu Hospital in Kingston Ontario and serves as Research director in ophthalmology at Queen’s University. During his career, he served as a founding editor of the Evidence Based Ophthalmology, a journal published by Lippincott Williams & Wilkins; and InsiderMedicine.com, a physician powered news organization in 2006.
