= Arun Kumar Sharma =

Indian botanist (1924–2017)

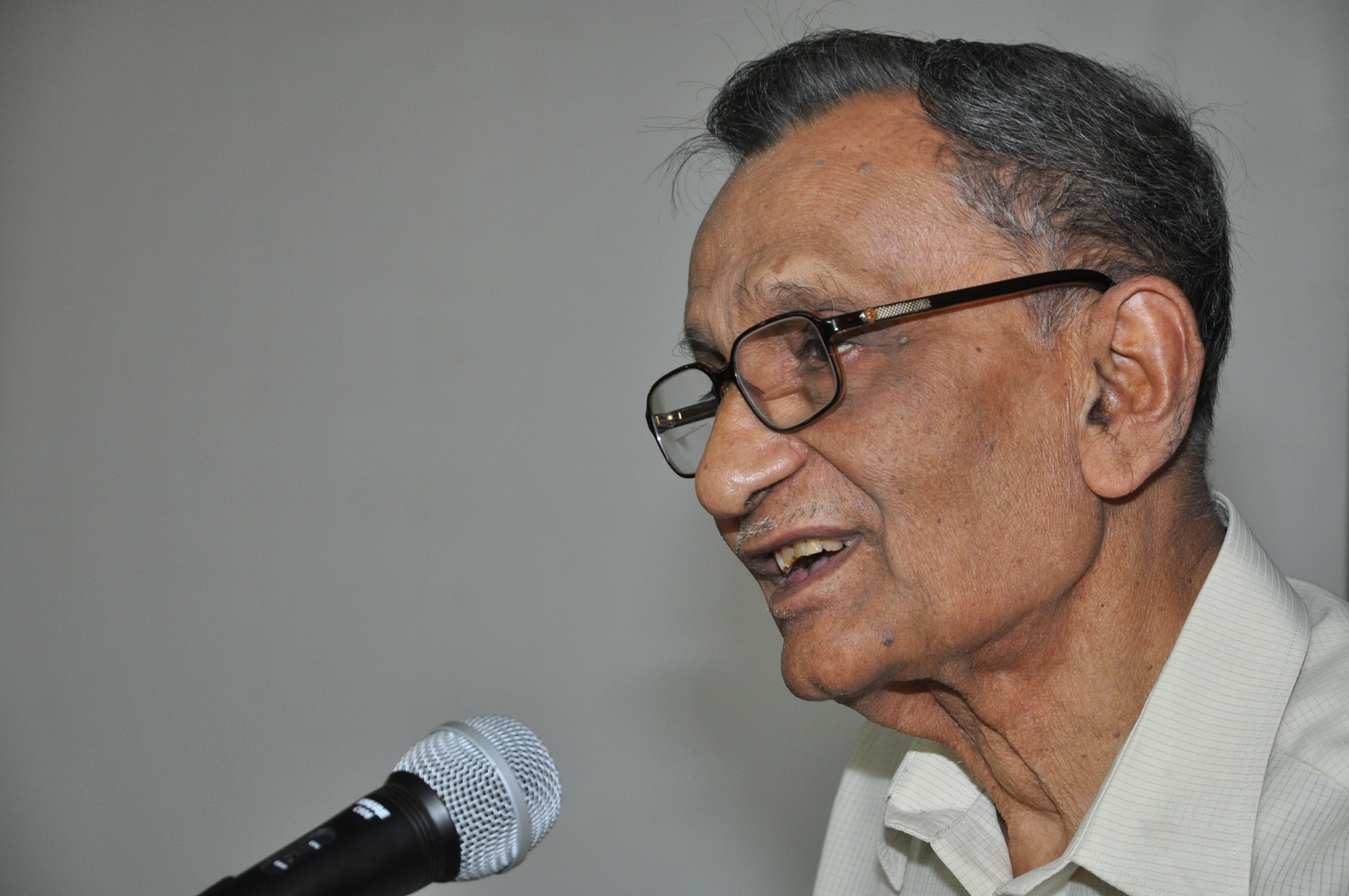
- Born: 31 December 1924; Kolkata, British India
- Died: 6 July 2017 (aged 92); Kolkata, West Bengal, India
- Education: Asutosh College (B.Sc.); Rajabazar Science College (M.Sc.) & (Ph.D.); University of Calcutta
- Known for: Studies on Chromosomes
- Awards: 1967 Shanti Swarup Bhatnagar Prize; 1972 AS Paul Bruhl Medal; 1974 IBS Birbal Sahni Medal; 1976 UGC J. C. Bose Award; 1976 INSA Silver Jubilee Medal; 1979 FICCI Award; 1983 Padma Bhushan; 1993 Om Prakash Bhasin Award; 1994 G. M. Modi Award; 1998 INSA M. N. Saha Medal; 1999 VASVIK Award; 2008 Rathindra Puraskar
- Scientific career
- Fields: Cytogenetics; Cytochemistry; Cell biology
- Workplaces: Botanical Survey of India; University of Calcutta

Arun Kumar Sharma (1924 – 2017), popularly known as AKS, was an Indian cytogeneticist, cell biologist, cytochemist and a former Sir Rashbehary Ghose Professor and Head of the Department of Botany at the University of Kolkata, College of Science and Technology. Considered by many as the father of Indian cytology, he headed the Centre for Advanced Study on Cell and Chromosome at the university and is known for his contributions to the studies on the physical and chemical nature of chromosomes. A Jawaharlal Nehru fellow, he is a recipient of several honors including the Om Prakash Bhasin Award and the VASVIK Industrial Research Award. The Council of Scientific and Industrial Research, the apex agency of the Government of India for scientific research, awarded him the Shanti Swarup Bhatnagar Prize for Science and Technology, one of the highest Indian science awards, in 1967, for his contributions to biological sciences. The Government of India awarded him the third highest civilian honor of the Padma Bhushan in 1983.

== Biography ==
Arun Kumar Sharma was born on the last day of 1924 in Calcutta in British India (now Kolkata in the Indian state of West Bengal ) to Charu Chandra Sharma–Shovamoyee couple. His family went into financial troubles when his father died when he was 8 years of age and he was brought up at his maternal grandparents' house. His early schooling was at Mitra Institution after which he joined Asutosh College of the University of Kolkata in 1939. He graduated (BSc) in Botany, studying on a half-free scholarship (Note: Where student pays only half the fees) in 1943 and followed it up with the master's degree (MSc) from Rajabazar Science College in 1945. Later, he would also secure a Doctor of Science degree from the same university in 1955. After completing his post graduate degree, he passed the Union Public Service Commission examination for a public service career and was among the five selected for Botanical Survey of India where his assignment was the development of the herbarium and the garden of the Royal Botanical Garden, Howrah. Here, he got training in taxonomy and worked as a temporary teacher but moved to the University of Kolkata, again as a temporary teacher in 1947. He became the assistant lecturer at the university in 1948 where he spent his entire academic life, superannuating in 1990 as the head of the department and project coordinator for the Centre for Advanced Study on Cell and Chromosome of the university in 1990. In between, he served as a lecturer (1952), reader (1962), professor (1970), Sir Rashbehary Ghose Professor (until 1988) and as an INSA Golden Jubilee Research Professor (1985–90) and continued his association with the university as an honorary professor past his official retirement.

Sharma was married to Archana Sharma, an academic, cytologist and science writer (Note: Archana Sharma co-authored four books by Sharma (Please refer Bibliography section)) and he lived in Kolkata; his wife died in 2008.

== Legacy ==
Sharma pioneered researches in cytogenetics and cytochemistry in India and is credited with developing new research techniques for the study of chromosome structure of plants. He propounded the concept of speciation in asexual organisms and the some of techniques he developed for the study of chromosomes with respect to their physical and chemical nature, such as repetitive DNA orcein banding, multiple DNA analysis and analysis of chemical nature of chromosomes, are being practiced globally. He introduced a new protocol for inducing division in adult nuclei through chemical application which assisted in cell rejuvenation. He redefined angiosperm taxonomy, proposed new concepts of the dynamic DNA and dynamic structure and behaviour of chromosomes and suggested the use of embryo irradiation and in-vitro cultures for the generation of variability, and tissue culture as a tool for conservation of endangered species and for maintaining genetic variability. His studies proved that organogenesis, differentiation and reproduction return variable chemical composition of chromosomes while maintaining the genetic skeleton. His researches have been documented by way of several books and over 500 articles; Chromosome Painting: Principles, Strategies and Scope, Chromosome Techniques: Theory and Practice, Chromosome Techniques — A Manual, Botanical Survey of India, Advances in Cell and Chromosome Research, Plant Genome: Biodiversity and Evolution (2 volumes), and Cytology of Different Species of Palms and Its Bearing on the Solution of the Problems of Phylogeny and Speciation are some of his notable works. He has also contributed chapters to reference manuals and texts such as the Botanical Review of Springer, International Review of Cytology of Elsevier, Encyclopaedia of Microscopy and Micro-technique of Van Nostrand and The Cell Nucleus and Tropical Botany of Academic Press and some of his books are prescribed texts for academic study. (Note: Chromosome Techniques — A Manual is a primary text for study at Utah State University)

Sharma was the founder of the Centre for Advanced Study on Cell and Chromosome which was established during his tenancy as the head of the department of Botany at the University of Kolkata. He chaired several national and international scientific committees such as the Indian National Committee of IUBS-INSA in 1978, Man and the Biosphere Programme Committee from 1981 to 1989, and the FASAS Commission on Science and Technology for Development in Asia in 1990 and has served as the co-chair of the Global Continuing Committee on Role of Scientific and Engineering Societies in Development in 1980), Birla Industrial & Technological Museum from 1990 to 1998, Plant and Biotechnology Committee of the Department of Biotechnology, in 1997 and the Plant Science Research Committee of the Council of Scientific and Industrial Research from 1998 to 2004. He was a member of the executive committee (1982–85) and the steering committee on Biological Monitoring of the State of Environment (1983) of the International Union of Biological Sciences and was a member of the Board of Trustees of the International Foundation for Science from 1984 to 1987. He served as the founder president of the Federation of Asian Scientific Academies and Societies when the federation was formed in 1984 and has presided the Society of Cytologists and Geneticists, India (1976–78), (Note: He was the founder treasurer of the society) Botanical Society of Bengal (1977–79), Indian Science Congress Association (1981), Indian Society of Cell Biology (1979–80), Indian Botanical Society (1980) and the Indian National Science Academy (1983–84). He is a former chief editor of The Nucleus journal of Springer and has been a member of the editorial boards of such journals as Proceedings of the Indian National Science Academy, the Journal of Cytology and Genetics, Proceedings of the Indian Academy of Sciences and the Indian Journal of Experimental Biology. He has also guided 80 PhD and 10 DSc scholars in their researches.

== Awards and honors ==
Sharma, who was selected for the Jawaharlal Nehru Fellowship for hs project on Chromosomes in Relations to Development and Differentiation in Higher Plants in 1972, received the Paul Bruhl Memorial Medal by the Asiatic Society the same year. The Indian Botanical Society awarded him the Birbal Sahni Medal in 1974 and he received the Shanti Swarup Bhatnagar Prize for Biological Sciences, one of the highest Indian science awards from the Council of Scientific and Industrial Research in 1976. He received two more awards in 1976, the inaugural J. C. Bose Award of the University Grants Commission and the Silver Jubilee Medal of the Indian National Science Academy (INSA), INSA would honor him again with Golden Jubilee Professorship in 1985 and Meghnad Saha Medal in 1998. The University Grants Commission selected him as a National Professor in 1977 and he received the FICCI Award of the Federation of Indian Chambers of Commerce and Industry in 1979. The Government of India included him in the Republic Day honors list for the third highest civilian honor of the Padma Bhushan in 1983.

Sharma received the Om Prakash Bhasin Award in 1992 and the VASVIK Industrial Research Award in 1999; in between he received the Gujar Mal Modi Award for Science and Technology of the International Institute of Fine Arts in 1994. He also received the Rathindra Puraskar of Visva-Bharati University in 2008. The Indian National Science Academy and the Indian Academy of Sciences elected him as their fellow in 1970 and 1975 respectively. The World Academy of Sciences chose him as their fellow in 1988 and the National Academy of Sciences, India followed suit in 2012. He is also a recipient of the degree of Doctor of Science (honoris causa) from Burdwan University.

== Selected bibliography ==
=== Books ===
- Arun Kumar Sharma; Santosh Kumar Sarkar (1956). Cytology of Different Species of Palms and Its Bearing on the Solution of the Problems of Phylogeny and Speciation. Martinus Nijhoff.
- Arun Kumar Sharma; Archana Sharma (1972). Chromosome techniques: theory and practice. Butterworths.
- Arun Kumar Sharma (1 January 1989). Advances in Cell and Chromosome Research. Oxford & IBH Publishing Company. ISBN 978-81-204-0451-9.
- Arun Kumar Sharma; J. S. Dhakre; Botanical Survey of India (1995). Flora of Agra District. Botanical Survey of India.
- Arun Kumar Sharma; Archana Sharma (1996). Chromosome Techniques — A Manual. Harwood Academic Publishers. p. 368. ISBN 9783718655137.
- Sharma, A. K., & Sharma, A. (1999). Plant chromosomes: Analysis, manipulation and engineering. Amsterdam: Harwood Academic.
- Arun Kumar Sharma; Archana Sharma (30 May 2006). Plant Genome: Biodiversity and Evolution. Science Publishers. ISBN 978-1-57808-413-5.
- A K Sharma (5 January 2006). Plant Genome: Biodiversity and EvolutionVol. 2: Lower Groups. Taylor & Francis. ISBN 978-1-57808-413-5.
- Arun Kumar Sharma; Archana Sharma (27 June 2011). Chromosome Painting: Principles, Strategies and Scope. Springer Science & Business Media. ISBN 978-94-010-0330-8.
- Arun Kumar Sharma; Archana Sharma (24 April 2014). Chromosome Techniques: Theory and Practice. Elsevier Science. ISBN 978-1-4831-0084-5.
- A. K. Sharma (2014). Encyclopaedia Of Cytology Genetics & Molecular Biology. Anmol Publications. p. 296. ISBN 9788126158133.

=== Articles ===
- Arun Kumar Sharma; Archana Sharm (December 1957). "Analysis of Chromosome Morphology and Possible Means of Speciation in Jasminum". Cytologia: 172–185.
- Arun Kumar Sharma, Hamsa Rama Aiyangar (January 1961). "Occurrence of B-chromosomes in diploid Allium stracheyi Baker and their elimination in polyploids". Chromosoma. 12 (1): 310–317. doi:10.1007/BF00328926. S2CID 28843392.
- Arun Kumar Sharma, Nripendra K. Bhattacharyya (January 2014). "Cytogenetics of Some Members of Portulacaceae and Related Families". Caryologia -Firenze. 8 (2): 257–274. doi:10.1080/00087114.1956.10797565.
- Arun Kumar Sharma, Nripendra K. Bhattacharyya (January 2014). "Cytology of Asphodelus Tenuifolius Cav". Caryologia -Firenze. 8 (2): 330–339. doi:10.1080/00087114.1957.10797626.
- Arun Kumar Sharma (January 2014). "A New Concept of a Means of Speciation in Plants". Caryologia -Firenze. 9 (1): 93–130. doi:10.1080/00087114.1956.10797584.
- Arun Kumar Sharma, Nripendra K. Bhattacharyya (January 2014). "Cytogenetics of Some Members of Portulacaceae and Related Families". Caryologia -Firenze. 8 (2): 257–274. doi:10.1080/00087114.1956.10797565.
- Arun Kumar Sharma, Santosh Kumar Sarkar (January 2014). "Veratrine: Its use in Cytochemistry". Caryologia -Firenze. 8 (2): 240–249. doi:10.1080/00087114.1956.10797563.
- Arun Kumar Sharma, Praphulla Chandra Datta (January 2014). "Artificial Polyploidy in Coriander (Coriandrum Sativum L.)". Caryologia -Firenze. 10 (1): 152–158. doi:10.1080/00087114.1957.10797618.
- Arun Kumar Sharma; Ruchi Singh; Sudheer Kumar; Prem L. Kashyap (July 2014). "Identification and Characterization of Microsatellite from Alternaria brassicicola to Assess Cross-Species Transferability and Utility as a Diagnostic Marker". Molecular Biotechnology. 56 (11): 1049–1059. doi:10.1007/s12033-014-9784-7. PMID 25048820. S2CID 207377237.
