= Dheeraj Sharma (filmmaker) =

Indian film director (born 1982)

- Hindi -धीरज शर्मा
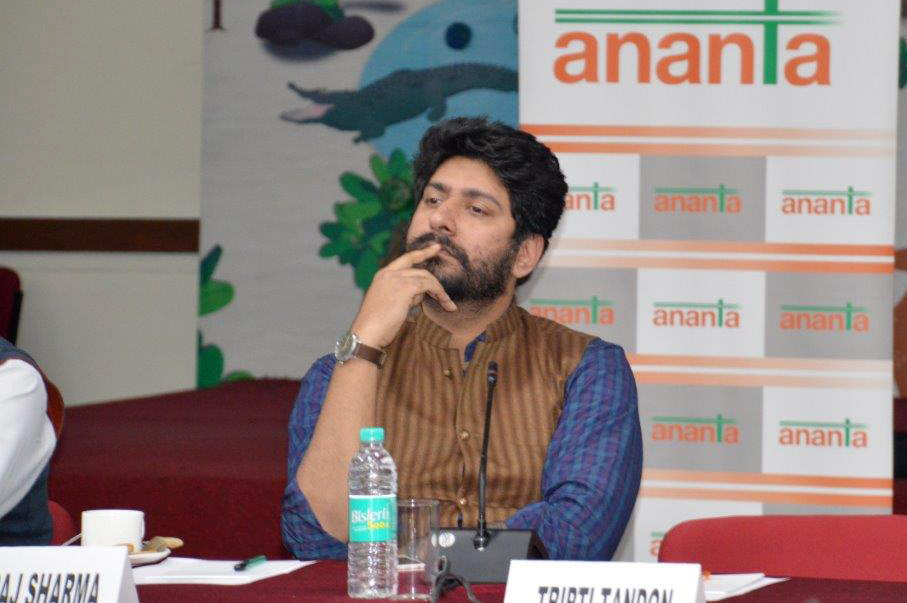
- Born: 20 February 1982 (age 44)

Dheeraj Sharma (born 20 February 1982) is a social worker and a documentary film maker based in Delhi, India. He is best known for directing the documentary film Nashebaaz- The Dying People of Delhi that is based on the topic of homeless drug addiction in Delhi. He is also the owner of stand up poetry club Mez which provide platform to young poets . His works are mostly based on exploring the dark subjects of society. He is also the director of the NGO - Team Pages. In 2017, a clip from his film became popular that showed the harsh reality of solvent abuse in homeless children in Delhi that later became an Internet Meme.
