= 1982 Women's Cricket World Cup =

International cricket tournament

- Dates: 10 January – 7 February 1982
- Administrator: International Women's Cricket Council
- Cricket format: Women's One Day International (60-over)
- Tournament format(s): Round-robin and final
- Host: New Zealand
- Champions: Australia (2nd title)
- Runners-up: England
- Participants: 5
- Matches: 31
- Most runs: (England) Jan Brittin (391)
- Most wickets: (Australia) Lyn Fullston (23)

The 1982 Women's Cricket World Cup, known as the 1982 Hansells Vita Fresh World Cup for sponsorship purposes, was an international cricket tournament played in New Zealand from 10 January to 7 February 1982. Hosted by New Zealand for the first time, it was the third edition of the Women's Cricket World Cup, coming four years after the previous 1978 World Cup in India.

The tournament, which featured a triple round-robin, was at the time the longest World Cup both in duration and the number of matches played. Five teams were originally invited in addition to the hosts, but the Netherlands were unable to attend and the West Indies withdrew in protest at New Zealand hosting the 1981 South Africa rugby union tour during the apartheid-era in South Africa. Those teams were instead replaced by a composite International XI team. Australia did not lose a single match, winning its second consecutive tournament by defeating England in the final at Lancaster Park, Christchurch. Australia's thirteen matches without defeat were part of a greater 24-match unbeaten run, extending from 1978 to 1985, which was a One Day International (ODI) record, before Australia itself broke it in 2021, with an unbeaten streak of 26 matches extending from 2018 to 2021. The World Cup was marked by its low scoring, with only one team recording more than 250 runs in an innings, and was also notable for featuring two matches that were tied – the first between England and New Zealand, and the second between England and Australia. They were the first ties in international women's cricket. England's Jan Brittin led the tournament in runs, while Australian spinner Lyn Fullston led the tournament in wickets.

== Background ==
Jack Hayward and Rachael Heyhoe-Flint organised the 1973 Women's Cricket World Cup, predating the first men's Cricket World Cup by two years. The tournament was played as a league format; the team who topped the points table at the conclusion would be champions. England beat Australia in the last match of the tournament to become the first Women's World Cup winners. The second Women's Cricket World Cup was scheduled to take place in South Africa in 1978, but with that country facing increasing sporting boycotts due to its apartheid policies, and withdrawals for financial reasons by the Netherlands and West Indies, the tournament was in jeopardy. The 1978 Women's Cricket World Cup was belatedly relocated to India, and featured only four teams. The tournament was once again played in a league format, but as in 1973, the final group match acted as a de facto final: Australia beat England to become champions.

During the 1978 World Cup, the International Women's Cricket Council (IWCC) met. The IWCC had not been involved in the running of either of the first two world cups, but felt that there had been a lack of organisation, and announced that they would be more involved with future world cups. Despite the involvement of the IWCC, the organisation of the 1982 event still primarily rested on the New Zealand Women's Cricket Council; which itself was mostly formed of the players themselves. They spent eighteen months planning the tournament. Their efforts resulted in the Women's World Cup having a title sponsor for the first time; it was officially known as the Hansells Vita Fresh World Cup.

== Format ==
Unlike the two previous women's world cups, the 1982 tournament featured a final. A round-robin league stage involved each of the five teams playing each other three times each; a total of 30 group matches, from which the top two teams qualified for the final. The tournament took place over 29 days, from 10 January to 7 February. Each match was played as a 60-overs-per-side contest.

== Participants ==
Five teams were invited: Australia, England, India, the Netherlands and the West Indies, but as in 1978, South Africa were not invited due to the ongoing boycott. Despite the increased sponsorship, and the involvement of the IWCC, participating teams and players had to fund their own visit. For example, each Indian player had to pay ₨10,000 (roughly £570, or US$1,000 at the time). (Note: Adjusting for inflation, in 2025 terms, the Indian players had to pay approximately the equivalent of £1,800. (UK Retail Price Index inflation figures are based on data from Clark, Gregory (2019). "The Annual RPI and Average Earnings for Britain, 1209 to Present (New Series)". MeasuringWorth. Retrieved 2 April 2020.)) This cost was prohibitive for the Dutch team, who withdrew from the tournament, as they had four years earlier. The West Indies also pulled out, in protest that New Zealand had hosted the apartheid-era South African rugby team in 1981. In order to prevent another four-team competition, the organising committee decided to invite a selection of players to form an International XI, as had featured at the 1973 World Cup.

== Squads ==
| Australia | England | India | International XI | New Zealand |
|---|---|---|---|---|
| Sharon Tredrea (c); Lee Albon; Denise Alderman; Marie Cornish; Lyn Fullston; Sharyn Hill; Jen Jacobs; Jill Kennare; Denise Martin; Karen Read; Terri Russell; Raelee Thompson; Peta Verco; Christine White | Susan Goatman (c); Enid Bakewell; Jan Brittin; Jacqueline Court; Rachel Heyhoe-Flint; Carole Hodges; Shirley Hodges; Glynis Hullah; Megan Lear; Jan Southgate; Avril Starling; Helen Stother; Janet Tedstone; Chris Watmough | Shantha Rangaswamy (c); Mangal Babar; Gargi Banerji; Vrinda Bhagat; Lopamudra Bhattacharji; Sharmila Chakraborty; Rajeshwari Dholakia; Diana Edulji; Nilima Jogalekar; Fowzieh Khalili; Shubhangi Kulkarni; Anjali Pendharker; Manjoo Sharma; Sujata Sridhar | Lynne Thomas (ENG) (c); Sandra Braganza (IND); Jan Hall (NZL); Lynley Hamilton (AUS); Mary Harris (NZL); Karen Jobling (ENG); Rhonda Kendall (AUS); Gill McConway (ENG); Renuka Majumder (IND); Chris Miller (NZL); Jenny Owens (AUS); Sue Rattray (NZL); Ingrid van der Elst (NED); Babette van Teunenbroek (NED) | Trish McKelvey (c); Eileen Badham; Barbara Bevege; Sue Brown; Vicki Burtt; Linda Fraser; Debbie Hockley; Jackie Lord; Carol Marett; Lesley Murdoch; Maureen Peters; Karen Plummer; Edna Ryan; Nicki Turner |

== Venues ==
1982 Women's Cricket World Cup venues
| Venue | City | Island | Matches | Map |
|---|---|---|---|---|
| Eden Park | Auckland | North | 2 | Venue locations within New Zealand |
| Cornwall Park | Auckland | North | 3 | Venue locations within New Zealand |
| Seddon Park | Hamilton | North | 1 | Venue locations within New Zealand |
| Pukekura Park | New Plymouth | North | 3 | Venue locations within New Zealand |
| McLean Park | Napier | North | 1 | Venue locations within New Zealand |
| Fitzherbert Park | Palmerston North | North | 3 | Venue locations within New Zealand |
| Cooks Gardens | Wanganui | North | 1 | Venue locations within New Zealand |
| Basin Reserve | Wellington | North | 6 | Venue locations within New Zealand |
| Hutt Recreation Ground | Lower Hutt | North | 1 | Venue locations within New Zealand |
| Logan Park | Dunedin | South | 2 | Venue locations within New Zealand |
| Trafalgar Park | Nelson | South | 1 | Venue locations within New Zealand |
| Christ's College | Christchurch | South | 2 | Venue locations within New Zealand |
| University of Canterbury grounds | Christchurch | South | 3 | Venue locations within New Zealand |
| Dudley Park | Rangiora | South | 1 | Venue locations within New Zealand |
| Lancaster Park | Christchurch | South | 1 | Venue locations within New Zealand |

== Group stage ==
=== Summary ===
The tournament began on 10 January 1982 with two matches played in Auckland. Australia beat India by 153 runs, a new record margin in women's ODIs. In the other match, another record was set; England and New Zealand played out the first tied match in women's ODIs. The tournament remained in Auckland for the next round of matches on 12 January; England beat India by four wickets, while New Zealand surpassed the record set by Australia two days earlier, by beating the International XI by 184 runs, a record which would stand for six years. New Zealand set another new record in their next match two days later, when they bowled India out for what was, at the time, the lowest total in women's ODIs: 37. On the same day in Hamilton, England beat the International XI by 132 runs. Australia beat New Zealand by eight wickets and England by 44 runs on consecutive days in New Plymouth, while India completed a 79-run victory over the International XI in Napier. England remained in New Plymouth, and beat New Zealand by seven wickets the day after their loss to Australia.

Continuing to move south, Australia beat the International XI by 64 runs in Palmerston North, while on the same day India beat England by 47 runs, India's first win over England, and a victory The Guardian described at the time as India's "best ever result in the World Cup". On 21 January, New Zealand beat the International XI by 97 runs. Two days later, Australia beat England by six wickets. England played again the next day, beating the International XI by nine wickets, while New Zealand beat India by eight wickets. Australia then won twice in two days, beating the International XI by 146 runs and India by four wickets. In the last round of matches played in the North Island, England beat New Zealand by five wickets, New Zealand then lost to Australia by 69 runs, before India beat the International XI by 78 runs.

The tournament moved to the South Island on 30 January; Australia beat the International XI by 76 runs in Dunedin. The next day, England beat India by ten wickets, and New Zealand beat the International XI by 84 runs. Australia and England tied the 25th match of the tournament; it was England's second tie of the group stage, and the second ever in women's ODIs. India were once again bowled out cheaply by New Zealand in their next match, and were beaten by eight wickets. On 4 February, Australia and England both posted large totals in their victories; Australia scored 193 for five as they beat India by 39 runs, while England scored 242 for four in a 113-run over the International XI. Two days later, Australia beat New Zealand by 41 runs, and India beat the International XI by 14 runs; meaning that the International XI did not record a win in the competition. In the final match of the group stage, Australia beat England by three wickets.

Having remained unbeaten throughout the tournament, only dropping points in their tie with England, Australia finished top of the table. England trailed them by fourteen points in second place; both qualified for the final. New Zealand won all their matches against India and the International XI, but against Australia and England, only gained points during their tie with England. India's victory over England was their only win that did not come against the International XI.

=== Points table ===
| Pos | Team | Pld | W | L | T | NR | Pts | RR |
|---|---|---|---|---|---|---|---|---|
| 1 | Australia | 12 | 11 | 0 | 1 | 0 | 46 | 3.124 |
| 2 | England | 12 | 7 | 3 | 2 | 0 | 32 | 2.988 |
| 3 | New Zealand | 12 | 6 | 5 | 1 | 0 | 26 | 2.534 |
| 4 | India | 12 | 4 | 8 | 0 | 0 | 16 | 2.296 |
| 5 | International XI | 12 | 0 | 12 | 0 | 0 | 0 | 2.034 |

- Teams marked progressed to the final.
- Note: run rate was to be used as a tiebreaker in the case of teams finishing on an equal number of points, rather than net run rate, which is now common.

=== Matches ===
10 January
Scorecard

| Australia; 227/6 (55 overs) | v | India; 74 (42 overs) |
| Jill Kennare 98; Sharmila Chakraborty 3/37 (12 overs) | | Anjali Pendharker 18; Raelee Thompson 2/9 (8 overs) |

Australia won by 153 runs
Eden Park (No. 2 Oval), Auckland
Umpires: Bruce Denison (NZL) and Ken Barron (NZL)

- Australia won the toss and elected to bat.
- The match was reduced to 55 overs per side due to rain.
- Denise Emerson, Denise Martin, Jen Jacobs, Jill Kennare, Lyn Fullston, Terri Russell (Aus), Anjali Pendharker, Shantha Rangaswamy, Sujata Sridhar and Vrinda Bhagat (Ind) all made their WODI debut.
- Australia's winning margin was a new record for ODIs, but was broken two days later, by New Zealand against the International XI.

10 January
Scorecard

| New Zealand; 147/9 (60 overs) | v | England; 147/8 (60 overs]) |
| Debbie Hockley 44; Avril Starling 3/7 (12 overs) | | Rachael Heyhoe-Flint 76; Maureen Peters 2/15 (12 overs) |

Match tied
Cornwall Park, Auckland
Umpires: Bruce Bricknell (NZL) and Gwen Nagel (NZL)

- England won the toss and elected to bowl.
- This match was the first tie in women's ODI matches.
- Avril Starling(Eng), Debbie Hockley, Karen Plummer, Lesley Murdoch, Nicki Turner, Sue Brown (NZ) all made their WODI debut.

12 January
Scorecard

| India; 112 (52.2 overs) | v | England; 114/6 (36 overs) |
| Shantha Rangaswamy 50; Glynis Hullah 2/5 (9.2 overs) | | Megan Lear 43; Diana Edulji 3/31 (12 overs) |

England won by 4 wickets
Cornwall Park, Auckland
Umpires: Ken Parris (NZL) and Gwen Nagel (NZL)

- India won the toss and elected to bat.

12 January
Scorecard

| New Zealand; 244/6 (60 overs) | v | International XI; 60 (34.4 overs) |
| Barb Bevege 101; Rhonda Kendall 4/48 (11 overs) | | Rhonda Kendall 22; Jackie Lord 3/4 (3.4 overs) |

New Zealand won by 184 runs
Eden Park (No. 2 Oval), Auckland
Umpires: Bruce Bricknell (NZL) and Sam Sukias (NZL)

- International XI won the toss and elected to bowl.
- New Zealand's winning margin set a new record for ODIs, beating Australia's mark that had been set only two days prior. The record was not beaten until the 1988 World Cup.
- Chris Miller, Gillian McConway, Ingrid van der Elst, Jan Hall, Jenny Owens, Karen Jobling, Linda Fraser, Lynley Hamilton, Marry Harris, Renuka Majumder and Rhonda Kendall (International XI) all made their WODI debut for International XI.

14 January
Scorecard

| England; 243/3 (60 overs) | v | International XI; 111/8 (60 overs) |
| Janette Brittin 138*; Gillian McConway 1/35 (7 overs) | | Lynne Thomas 46; Janet Tedstone 2/6 (12 overs) |

England won by 132 runs
Seddon Park, Hamilton
Umpires: Bruce Bricknell (NZL) and John Hastie (NZL)

- International XI won the toss and elected to bowl.
- Carole Hodges, Helen Stother (Eng) and Sandra Braganza (International XI) all made their WODI debut.
- England's Janette Brittin set the record for the highest individual score in a WODI, which was not beaten until 1988 World cup.

14 January
Scorecard

| New Zealand; 80 (58.5 overs) | v | India; 37 (35 overs) |
| Nicki Turner 22; Diana Edulji 3/10 (11.5 overs) | | Rajeshwari Dholakia 10*; Jackie Lord 6/10 (8 overs) |

New Zealand won by 43 runs
Cornwall Park, Auckland
Umpires: Bruce Denison (NZL) and Gwen Nagel (NZL)

- New Zealand won the toss and elected to bat.
- India broke the record for the lowest score in an ODI match, which had been set by Young England at the 1973 World Cup.
- New Zealand's total is the lowest to be successfully defended in an ODI, and the combined match aggregate of 117 runs is the lowest in a match where both sides were bowled out.

16 January
Scorecard

| New Zealand; 109/7 (60 overs) | v | Australia; 110/2 (41 overs) |
| Barb Bevege 33; Raelee Thompson 2/11 (12 overs) | | Peta Verco 50*; Eileen Badham 2/27 (10 overs) |

Australia won by 8 wickets
Pukekura Park, New Plymouth
Umpires: Graeme Reardon (NZL) and Ray Corric (NZL)

- New Zealand won the toss and elected to bat.
- Christine White (Aus) made her WODI debut.

17 January
Scorecard

| Australia; 195/8 (60 overs) | v | England; 151/9 (60 overs) |
| Denise Emerson 61; Enid Bakewell 2/32 (12 overs) | | Susan Goatman 32; Lyn Fullston 3/19 (11 overs) |

Australia won by 44 runs
Pukekura Park, New Plymouth
Umpires: Dickie Bird (ENG) and Stan Copelin (NZL)

- Australia won the toss and elected to bat.

17 January
Scorecard

| India; 192/7 (60 overs) | v | International XI; 113 (56.2 overs) |
| Shubhangi Kulkarni 37; Sandra Braganza 3/41 (12 overs) | | Lynne Thomas 70*; Sharmila Chakraborty 4/11 (9 overs) |

India won by 79 runs
McLean Park, Napier
Umpires: Des Morrison (NZL) and G Lowe (NZL)

- India won the toss and elected to bat.

18 January
Scorecard

| New Zealand; 170/8 (60 overs) | v | England; 171/3 (56.5 overs) |
| Barb Bevege 32; Debbie Hockley 32; Jacqueline Court 2/34 (12 overs) | | Susan Goatman 56; Sue Brown 1/25 (10.5 overs) |

England won by 7 wickets
Pukekura Park, New Plymouth
Umpires: Graeme Reardon (NZL) and Stan Copelin (NZL)

- New Zealand won the toss and elected to bat.

20 January
Scorecard

| Australia; 164 (59 overs) | v | International XI; 100 (58.4 overs) |
| Raelee Thompson 50*; Sandra Braganza 4/24 (12 overs) | | Sue Rattray 33; Lyn Fullston 4/38 (12 overs) |

Australia won by 64 runs
Fitzherbert Park, Palmerston North
Umpires: G Lowe (NZL) and Ray Trott (NZL)

- Australia won the toss and elected to bat.
- Karen Read and Lee Albon (Aus) both made their WODI debut.

20 January
Scorecard

| India; 178/7 (60 overs) | v | England; 131 (55.5 overs) |
| Fowzieh Khalili 88; Enid Bakewell 3/13 (12 overs) | | Janette Brittin 38; Shubhangi Kulkarni 3/19 (8 overs) |

India won by 47 runs
Cooks Gardens, Wanganui
Umpires: Denis Collinge (NZL) and Stan Copelin (NZL)

- India won the toss and elected to bat.

21 January
Scorecard

| New Zealand; 177/8 (60 overs) | v | International XI; 80 (55.4 overs) |
| Barb Bevege 80; Sue Rattray 4/33 (11 overs) | | Chris Miller 21; Jackie Lord 3/12 (12 overs) |

New Zealand won by 97 runs
Fitzherbert Park, Palmerston North
Umpires: Dickie Bird (ENG) and David Kinsella (NZL)

- New Zealand won the toss and elected to bat.

23 January
Scorecard

| England; 119 (59.5 overs) | v | Australia; 120/4 (53.5 overs) |
| Enid Bakewell 33; Denise Martin 2/9 (12 overs) | | Peta Verco 48; Avril Starling 1/23 (10 overs) |

Australia won by 6 wickets
Basin Reserve, Wellington
Umpires: Dickie Bird (ENG) and Steve Woodward (NZL)

- Australia won the toss and elected to bowl.

24 January
Scorecard

| International XI; 145 (60 overs) | v | England; 149/1 (35.4 overs) |
| Sue Rattray 68; Carole Hodges 4/32 (12 overs) | | Susan Goatman 63*; Sandra Braganza 1/19 (5 overs) |

England won by 9 wickets
Basin Reserve, Wellington
Umpires: Bob Bradley (NZL) and Dave Geenfield (NZL)

- England won the toss and elected to bowl.

24 January
Scorecard

| India; 78 (50.5 overs) | v | New Zealand; 80/2 (28.1 overs) |
| Rajeshwari Dholakia 20; Carol Marett 2/10 (11 overs); Maureen Peters 2/10 (8.5 overs) | | Nicki Turner 42; Shubhangi Kulkarni 2/17 (4.1 overs) |

New Zealand won by 8 wickets
Fitzherbert Park, Palmerston North
Umpires: G Lowe (NZL) and Owen Walters (NZL)

- New Zealand won the toss and elected to bowl.

25 January
Scorecard

| Australia; 266/5 (60 overs) | v | International XI; 120/7 (60 overs) |
| Jill Kennare 47; Sue Rattray 3/44 (12 overs) | | Lynne Thomas 36; Lyn Fullston 3/24 (12 overs) |

Australia won by 146 runs
Basin Reserve, Wellington
Umpires: Ron Wood (NZL) and Dickie Bird (ENG)

- International XI won the toss and elected to bowl.

26 January
Scorecard

| India; 107/8 (40 overs) | v | Australia; 108/6 (32.5 overs) |
| Fowzieh Khalili 29; Marie Cornish 2/11 (8 overs) | | Jen Jacobs 30; Shantha Rangaswamy 2/16 (8 overs) |

Australia won by 4 wickets
Basin Reserve, Wellington
Umpires: Malcolm Phipps (NZL) and Michael Spring (NZL)

- Australia won the toss and elected to bowl.
- The match was reduced to 40-overs-per-side before the start of play due to rain.

27 January
Scorecard

| New Zealand; 169 (58.4 overs) | v | England; 170/5 (59.1 overs) |
| Nicki Turner 55; Janet Tedstone 3/32 (11.4 overs) | | Janette Brittin 60; Eileen Badham 1/34 (12 overs) |

England won by 5 wickets
Basin Reserve, Wellington
Umpires: Robert Monteith (NZL) and Dickie Bird (ENG)

- New Zealand won the toss and elected to bat.

28 January
Scorecard

| Australia; 170/8 (50 overs) | v | New Zealand; 101 (57.1 overs) |
| Karen Read 46; Maureen Peters 2/11 (12 overs) | | Vicki Burtt 23; Lyn Fullston 5/27 (12 overs) |

Australia won by 69 runs
Basin Reserve, Wellington
Umpires: Robert Monteith (NZL) and Stan Cowman (NZL)

- Australia won the toss and elected to bat.

28 January
Scorecard

| India; 154/8 (60 overs) | v | International XI; 76 (32.3 overs) |
| Gargi Banerjee 55; Karen Jobling 2/16 (9 overs) | | Rhonda Kendall 23; Lopamudra Bhattacharj 3/18 (5 overs) |

India won by 78 runs
Hutt Recreation Ground, Lower Hutt
Umpires: David Abbott (NZL) and Malcolm Phipps (NZL)

- India won the toss and elected to bat.

30 January
Scorecard

| Australia; 200/8 (60 overs) | v | International XI; 124/5 (60 overs) |
| Peta Verco 52; Sue Rattray 2/28 (12 overs) | | Lynne Thomas 40; Lyn Fullston 2/33 (12 overs) |

Australia won by 76 runs
Logan Park, Dunedin
Umpires: Alfred Turner (NZL) and George Morris (NZL)

- Australia won the toss and elected to bat.

31 January
Scorecard

| India; 61 (37 overs) | v | England; 63/0 (21.3 overs) |
| Sharmila Chakraborty 14*; Janet Tedstone 4/17 (12 overs) | | Janette Brittin 34* |

England won by 10 wickets
Trafalgar Park, Nelson
Umpires: Barry Blommart (NZL) and Don Farquhar (NZL)

- India won the toss and elected to bat.

31 January
Scorecard

| New Zealand; 199/7 (60 overs) | v | International XI; 115/7 (60 overs) |
| Debbie Hockley 77; Lynley Hamilton 2/29 (12 overs) | | Lynne Thomas 24; Maureen Peters 2/17 (12 overs) |

New Zealand won by 84 runs
Logan Park, Dunedin
Umpires: Alfred Turner (NZL) and George Morris (NZL)

- New Zealand won the toss and elected to bat.

2 February
Scorecard

| England; 167/8 (60 overs) | v | Australia; 167 (60 overs) |
| Megan Lear 58; Raelee Thompson 2/39 (12 overs) | | Jen Jacobs 43; Avril Starling 3/20 (12 overs) |

Match tied
Christ's College, Christchurch
Umpires: Doug Wilson (NZL) and Terry Baines (NZL)

- Australia won the toss and elected to bowl.
- This match was the second tie in women's ODI matches. Another tie did not occur until December 1997.

2 February
Scorecard

| India; 49 (37.5 overs) | v | New Zealand; 50/2 (23.1 overs) |
| Shubhangi Kulkarni 16; Jackie Lord 4/12 (7.5 overs) | | Nicki Turner 15*; Sharmila Chakraborty 1/6 (3 overs) |

New Zealand won by 8 wickets
University of Canterbury, Christchurch
Umpires: Ian Higginson (NZL) and Brian Aldridge (NZL)

- New Zealand won the toss and elected to bowl.

4 February
Scorecard

| Australia; 193/5 (60 overs) | v | India; 154/7 (60 overs) |
| Jill Kennare 69; Shubhangi Kulkarni 2/34 (10 overs) | | Anjali Pendharker 47; Raelee Thompson 3/49 (12 overs) |

Australia won by 39 runs
University of Canterbury, Christchurch
Umpires: Dickie Bird (ENG) and Brian Aldridge (NZL)

- Australia won the toss and elected to bat.

4 February
Scorecard

| England; 242/4 (60 overs) | v | International XI; 129/7 (60 overs) |
| Susan Goatman 83; Jan Hall 1/30 (9 overs) | | Lynne Thomas 56*; Enid Bakewell 2/24 (12 overs) |

England won by 113 runs
Christ's College, Christchurch
Umpires: Bob Condliffe (NZL) and Terry Baines (NZL)

- International XI won the toss and elected to bowl.

6 February
Scorecard

| Australia; 147/7 (60 overs) | v | New Zealand; 106 (58 overs) |
| Marie Cornish 55*; Eileen Badham 2/14 (12 overs) | | Jackie Lord 18; Raelee Thompson 3/16 (11 overs) |

Australia won by 39 runs
Dudley Park, Rangiora
Umpires: Ian Higginson (NZL) and Rodger McHarg (NZL)

- Australia won the toss and elected to bat.

6 February
Scorecard

| India; 170/9 (60 overs) | v | International XI; 156 (55.3 overs) |
| Shantha Rangaswamy 47; Jenny Owens 4/13 (12 overs) | | Sue Rattray 45; Shantha Rangaswamy 3/25 (12 overs) |

India won by 14 runs
University of Canterbury, Christchurch
Umpires: Eric Chisnall (NZL) and Jeremy Busby (NZL)

- International XI won the toss and elected to bowl.
- Babette van Teunenbroek made her WODI debut for International XI.

== Final ==
The final was the only match of the tournament played at Lancaster Park, Christchurch, and took place in front of a crowd of 3,000. Dickie Bird became the only umpire to stand in both a men's and women's World Cup final. England won the toss and batted first. They scored slowly until the last ten overs of their innings; Jan Southgate made their highest score, with 53 runs, but found batting difficulty against Australia's spin bowling. In the last ten overs, England played more expansively, and eventually finished with 151 runs, meaning that Australia would need to score 152 to win. Australia lost three wickets early in their chase, but were steadied by a partnership between Karen Read and Sharon Tredrea. Quick scoring from Jen Jacobs and Marie Cornish late-on in the innings helped Australia to their target with six balls remaining, securing a three-wicket victory, and their second World Cup title.

7 February
Scorecard

| England; 151/5 (60 overs) | v | Australia; 152/7 (59 overs) |
| Jan Southgate 53 (104); Lyn Fullston 2/20 (12 overs) | | Jen Jacobs 37 (45); Avril Starling 2/21 (12 overs) |

Australia won by 3 wickets
Lancaster Park, Christchurch
Umpires: Dickie Bird (Eng) and Fred Goodall (NZ)

- England won the toss and elected to bat.

== Statistics ==
England's Jan Brittin finished with the most runs during the World Cup, having accumulated 391, ahead of the 383 scored by Lynne Thomas of the International XI and Susan Goatman, also of England, who scored 374. Brittin also made the highest score of the tournament, when she scored 138 not out against the International XI. The only other century of the tournament came against the same opposition: Barbara Bevege's 101. The best averages of the competition were achieved by England's Heyhoe-Flint, with 47.83, and two Australians, Jill Kennare (43.87) and Lyn Fullston (41.00).

Amongst the bowlers, Fullston took the most wickets (23), followed by Jackie Lord of New Zealand, with 22, and India's Shubhangi Kulkarni, who took 20. Lord had the best bowling figures in an innings, when she took six wickets against India. The only other bowler to take five wickets in an innings was Fullston, who did so against New Zealand, taking five for 27. Kulkarni had the best bowling average in the World Cup, collecting her wickets at 11.70. She was followed by Fullston (12.00) and Lord (12.40). The most economical bowler was New Zealand's Sue Brown, who conceded 1.53 runs per over, followed by a pair of Australians; Cornish (1.76) and Denise Martin (1.77).

=== Leading run scorers ===
| Player | Team | Mat | Inns | Runs | Ave | HS | 100 | 50 |
|---|---|---|---|---|---|---|---|---|
| Jan Brittin | England | 12 | 12 | 391 | 39.10 | 138* | 1 | 1 |
| Lynne Thomas | International XI | 12 | 12 | 383 | 38.30 | 70* | 0 | 2 |
| Susan Goatman | England | 13 | 13 | 374 | 34.00 | 83 | 0 | 3 |
| Jill Kennare | Australia | 9 | 9 | 351 | 43.87 | 98 | 0 | 2 |
| Barbara Bevege | New Zealand | 10 | 10 | 320 | 32.00 | 101 | 1 | 1 |
Source:ESPNCricinfo

=== Leading wicket takers ===
| Player | Team | Mat | Inns | Wkts | Ave | Econ | BBI | SR |
|---|---|---|---|---|---|---|---|---|
| Lyn Fullston | Australia | 12 | 12 | 23 | 12.00 | 2.24 | 5/57 | 32.00 |
| Jackie Lord | New Zealand | 12 | 11 | 22 | 12.40 | 2.40 | 6/10 | 30.9 |
| Shubhangi Kulkarni | India | 12 | 12 | 20 | 11.70 | 2.89 | 3/19 | 24.2 |
| Sharmila Chakraborty | India | 12 | 12 | 17 | 13.82 | 2.38 | 4/11 | 34.7 |
| Avril Starling | England | 13 | 13 | 16 | 16.68 | 1.86 | 3/7 | 53.6 |
| Janet Tedstone | England | 13 | 13 | 16 | 21.68 | 2.24 | 4/17 | 58.0 |
Source:ESPNCricinfo
