= 1982 Women's Cricket World Cup final =

Cricket match

1982 Women's Cricket World Cup Final
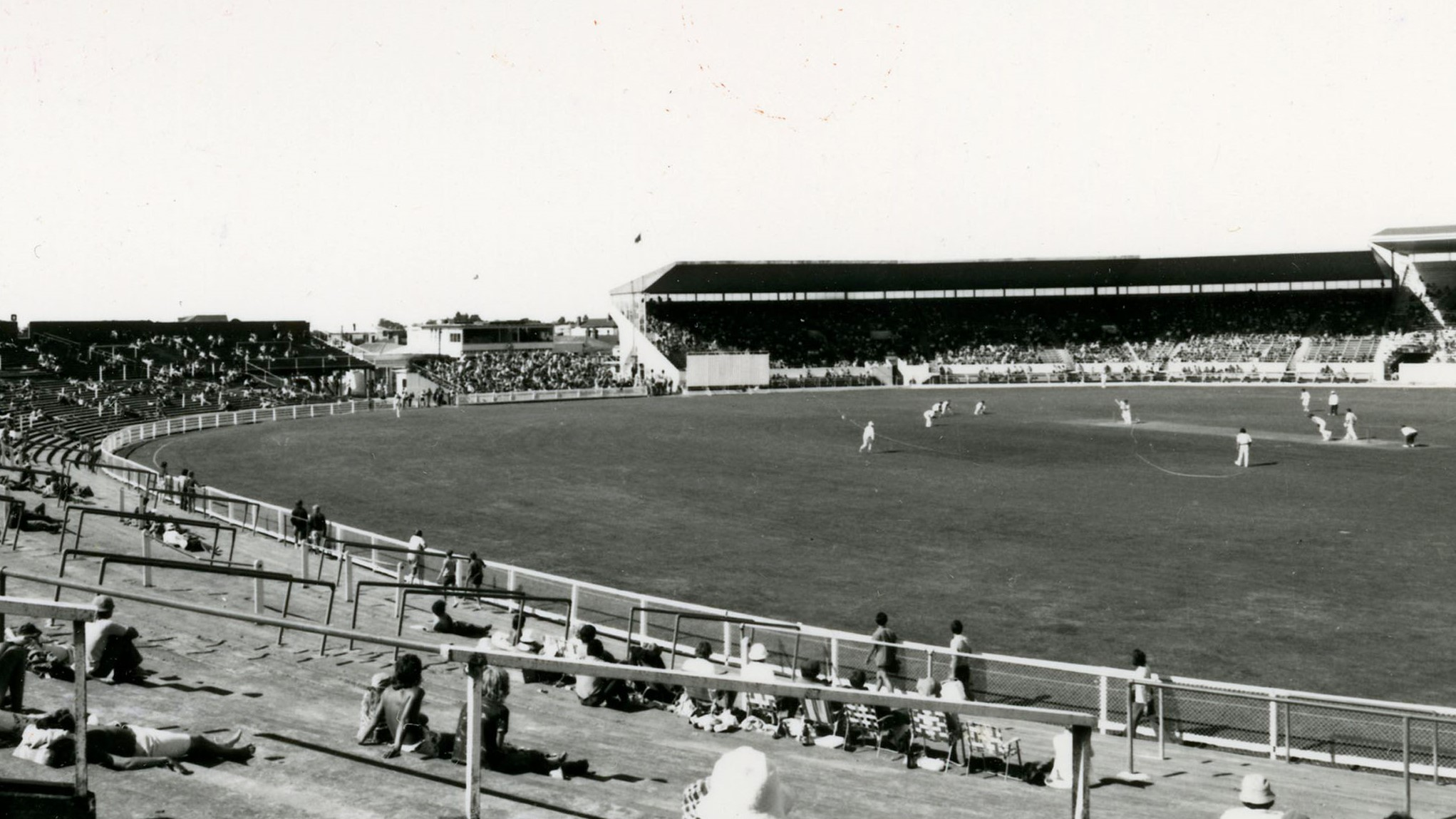
- The final was played at Lancaster Park, pictured in 1978.
- Event: 1982 Women's Cricket World Cup
| England | Australia |
| (England) | (Australia) |
| 151/5 | 152/7 |
| 60 overs | 59 overs |
- Australia won by 3 wickets
- Date: 7 February 1982
- Venue: Lancaster Park, Christchurch, New Zealand
- Umpires: Dickie Bird (Eng) and Fred Goodall (NZ)

The 1982 Women's Cricket World Cup Final was a one-day cricket match between the Australia women's national cricket team and the England women's cricket team played on 7 February 1982 at Lancaster Park in Christchurch, New Zealand. It marked the culmination of the 1982 Women's Cricket World Cup, the third edition of the tournament, but was the first time a final had been held; both the previous events had been round-robin tournaments. Both Australia and England had previously won the competition; England won the inaugural tournament in 1973, while Australia won in 1978. Australia won the match by three wickets to claim their second world title.

Australia and England finished first and second in the league-stage to claim their places in the final. Australia had gone unbeaten throughout the round-robin, having won eleven of their matches and tied with England in the other. England had won seven of their matches, lost three and tied twice, and finished 14 points behind Australia and 6 ahead of New Zealand. The final was umpired by Dickie Bird and Fred Goodall. England batted first in the final, and scored slowly, particularly against Australia's spin bowling. Jan Southgate top-scored for England with 53 runs, as they made 151 for five. In response, Australia initially struggled, losing their first three wickets for 28 runs. A partnership between Karen Read and Sharon Tredrea recovered their innings, before quick scoring from Jen Jacobs and Marie Cornish saw them to victory.

== Background ==
The 1982 Women's Cricket World Cup was the third Women's Cricket World Cup. The first had been held in 1973, pre-dating the first men's Cricket World Cup by two years. The 1982 tournament featured five teams; Australia, England, India, New Zealand and an International XI. It took place between 10 January and 7 February, featuring 31 matches over 29 days. England had won the first world cup on home soil, before Australia claimed the second, held in India. Neither tournament had featured a final, but had rather been league competitions, in which the team which finished with the most points won.

== Route to the final ==
Each team played twelve matches during the round-robin stage of the tournament, facing each other three times. The top two teams would progress directly to the final, the first time the tournament would feature a final. Australia remained unbeaten; they won eleven of their matches and tied their other, against England. On the opening day of the tournament, Jill Kennare scored 98 runs, as Australia beat India by 153 runs. Four days later, England's Jan Brittin made the highest score of the tournament, 138 not out, against the International XI. England won seven of their matches, lost three times (twice against Australia and once against India), and tied two matches (in addition to the tie against Australia, they also tied with New Zealand). Australia finished top of the table with 46 points, and England were second with 32. Hosts New Zealand scored 26 points, India 16, while the International XI lost all their matches to finish with no points.

== Match ==
=== Summary ===
The final was played at Lancaster Park, in Christchurch, New Zealand, on 7 February, in front of a crowd of around 3,000. The match was umpired by a New Zealander, Fred Goodall, and the English umpire, Dickie Bird. By officiating in the match, Bird became the only umpire to stand in both a men's and women's World Cup final, having previously umpired the 1975 Cricket World Cup Final. The England captain, Susan Goatman, won the toss, (Note: Contemporary Australian newspaper reports stated that Australia won the toss, but online scorecards, and the International Cricket Council's history of the Women's World Cup, record that England won the toss and chose to bat first.) and chose to bat first on a pitch described as "placid" by the Australian press. The England opening batters, Brittin and Goatman, scored slowly, putting on 42 runs together before Brittin was dismissed by a diving catch from Marie Cornish off her own bowling for 17 runs. England scored another 12 runs before Goatman was bowled by Lyn Fullston for 29. Fullston was also the bowler for the next wicket; Chris Watmough was caught at mid-on by Kennare for 9, and England were 63 for three. England's experienced partnership of Jan Southgate and Rachael Heyhoe-Flint aimed to recover the England innings, but were restricted by Australia's spin bowling. Southgate in particular was described in The Age as being "uncomfortable against the spin", while The Times criticised Heyhoe-Flint for "not forcing the pace when England had wickets in hand." In the final ten overs, the England batters began to score more quickly; but both were dismissed shortly before the close of the innings. Southgate, who made the team's highest score, 53 runs, was caught by Sharyn Hill off the bowling of Sharon Tredrea, while Heyhoe-Flint was caught by Fullston off Tredrea's bowling for 29. England finished with 151 for five.

Australia's reply started poorly; they lost three wickets in the first eleven overs, taking the score to 28 for three. Their opening pair, Peta Verco and Hill, were both caught by Goatman off the bowling of Avril Starling, while Kennare was the first of three Australian to be run out. Karen Read and Australia's captain, Tredrea, formed a solid partnership and steadied their team's innings. The pair scored 54 runs together before they were both dismissed in quick succession; Read was caught by Southgate off the bowling of Janet Tedstone for 32, while Tredrea was caught behind off Carole Hodges for 25. Australia were 97 for five, needing another 55 runs to win. England adopted a tight field to minimise Australia's scoring options, but Jen Jacobs lofted the ball over the fielders during her innings of 37, which The Times described as one of the highlights of the match. Cornish, who had been playing a support role until that point, then assumed control and scored seven runs from one over bowled by Enid Bakewell, but with Australia still needing seven runs, Raelee Thompson was run out. The Times praised England's "excellent work in the field", though it was ultimately a mis-field that gave Australia their winning run in the penultimate over. Cornish remained not out with 24 runs, and Australia won the match by three wickets with six balls remaining.

=== Scorecard ===
- Toss: England won the toss and elected to field first
- Result: Australia won by three wickets

England batting innings
| Batsman | Method of dismissal | Runs |
|---|---|---|
| Jan Brittin | c & b Marie Cornish | 17 |
| Susan Goatman * | b Lyn Fullston | 29 |
| Chris Watmough | c Jill Kennare b Lyn Fullston | 9 |
| Jan Southgate | c Sharyn Hill b Sharon Tredrea | 53 |
| Rachael Heyhoe-Flint | c Lyn Fullston b Sharon Tredrea | 29 |
| Glynis Hullah | not out | 1 |
| Enid Bakewell | not out | 0 |
| Extras | (5 byes, 7 leg byes, 1 wide) | 13 |
| Totals | (60 overs, 2.51 runs per over) | 151/5 |
Did not bat: Carole Hodges, Janet Tedstone, Shirley Hodges †, Avril Starling

Australia bowling
| Bowler | Overs | Maidens | Runs | Wickets | Economy |
|---|---|---|---|---|---|
| Sharon Tredrea | 12 | 2 | 36 | 2 | 3.00 |
| Raelee Thompson | 12 | 2 | 34 | 0 | 2.83 |
| Denise Martin | 12 | 2 | 31 | 0 | 2.58 |
| Marie Cornish | 12 | 6 | 17 | 1 | 1.41 |
| Lyn Fullston | 12 | 3 | 20 | 2 | 1.66 |

Australia batting innings
| Batsman | Method of dismissal | Runs |
|---|---|---|
| Peta Verco | c Susan Goatman b Avril Starling | 7 |
| Sharyn Hill | c Susan Goatman b Avril Starling | 12 |
| Jill Kennare | run out | 4 |
| Karen Read | c Jan Southgate b Janet Tedstone | 32 |
| Sharon Tredrea * | c Shirley Hodges † b Carole Hodges | 25 |
| Jen Jacobs | run out | 37 |
| Marie Cornish | not out | 24 |
| Raelee Thompson | run out | 3 |
| Lyn Fullston | not out | 0 |
| Extras | (2 byes, 3 leg byes, 2 no balls, 1 wide) | 8 |
| Totals | (59 overs, 2.57 runs per over) | 152/7 |
Did not bat: Denise Martin, Terri Russell †

England bowling
| Bowler | Overs | Maidens | Runs | Wickets | Economy |
|---|---|---|---|---|---|
| Janet Tedstone | 12 | 4 | 24 | 1 | 2.00 |
| Avril Starling | 11 | 3 | 21 | 2 | 1.90 |
| Glynis Hullah | 11 | 0 | 35 | 0 | 3.18 |
| Enid Bakewell | 12 | 3 | 26 | 0 | 2.16 |
| Carole Hodges | 12 | 1 | 33 | 1 | 2.75 |
| Chris Watmough | 1 | 0 | 5 | 0 | 5.00 |

Umpires:

- Dickie Bird and Fred Goodall

Key

- * – Captain
- † – Wicket-keeper
- c Fielder – Indicates that the batsman was dismissed by a catch by the named fielder
- b Bowler – Indicates which bowler gains credit for the dismissal
- c & b Bowler – Indicates that the batsman was dismissed by a catch by the bowler

== Aftermath ==
England's Brittin finished at the tournament's leading run-scorer, with 391 runs, while Australia's Fullston took the most wickets, with 23. England's captain, Goatman, announced her retirement after the tournament; she had led England for three years, having previously captained the Young England team during the 1973 tournament. Southgate was appointed as her replacement as captain. Writing for Wisden, Netta Rheinberg noted that England could no longer "consider themselves able to fend off all challenges", and that as a result they implemented efforts to improve cricket at a junior level, to encourage future talent.

Australia and England met again in the final of the 1988 Women's Cricket World Cup, when Australia won by eight wickets. Between them, Australia and England have won ten of the eleven Women's Cricket World Cups; only in 2000 did one of the pair fail to win, when New Zealand beat Australia in the final.
