= India women's cricket team in Australia and New Zealand in 1976–77 =

The Indian women's cricket team toured Australia and New Zealand from December to January 1976–77. The tour included one Women's Test match each against New Zealand and Australia. The tour also included five other first-class, four List A and three other fixtures against various domestic teams in New Zealand.

== Tour games ==
=== 60-over: North Shore Women v India Women ===
15 December 1976
Scorecard

India; 117/8 (60 overs)	v	North Shore; 106 (56.2 overs)
Diana Edulji 36; Liz Allan 2/20 (12 overs)		Sheila Washington 20; Eileen Badham 20; Rajeshwari Dholakia 3/16 (5 overs)

India won by 11 runs
Stanley Bay, Auckland

- North Shore won the toss and elected to field.

== Test matches ==
=== Only Test: New Zealand vs India ===
8 January 1977
Scorecard

New Zealand	v	India
200 (98.4 overs); Cheryl Henshilwood 41; Shubhangi Kulkarni 4/63 (24.4 overs)		177 (134.3 cvers); Shantha Rangaswamy 108; Jackie Lord 5/40 (40.3 overs)
225/4d (102 overs); Barbara Bevege 100*; Diana Edulji 2/66 (35 overs)		45/3 (49 overs); Shantha Rangaswamy 25; Maureen Peters 1/5 (6 overs)

Match drawn
Carisbrook, Dunedin
Umpires: Gwen Nagel and George Morris

- India Women won the toss and decided to field.
- Cheryl Henshilwood (NZ) and Vicki Burtt (NZ) made their debut in women's Test matches

=== Only Test: Australia vs India ===
15 January 1977
Scorecard

Australia	v	India
266 (68.2 overs); Elaine Bray 86; Shubhangi Kulkarni 6/99 (22.2 overs)		122 (64.5 overs); Diana Edulji 32; Lynn Denholm 2/10 (5.5 overs)
152/1d (31 overs); Margaret Jennings 57*; Shantha Rangaswamy 1/44 (11 overs)		149 (84 overs); Shantha Rangaswamy 55; Raelee Thompson 4/41 (21 overs)

Australia Women won by 147 runs
Craig Oval, Hale School, Perth
Umpires: James D'Arcy-Evans and Peter McConnell

- Australia Women won the toss and decided to bat
- Peta Verco and Christine White (both Aus) made their debut in women's Test matches.
