= Babette van Teunenbroek =

Dutch cricketer (born 1960)

Personal information
- Full name: Babette van Teunenbroek
- Born: 1960 (age 65–66); Netherlands
- Role: Batter

International information
- National sides: International XI (1982); Netherlands (1984–1989)
- ODI debut (cap 27/10): 6 February 1982; International XI v India
- Last ODI: 20 July 1989; Netherlands v Ireland

Career statistics
Competition	WODI
Matches	10
Runs scored	71
Batting average	7.10
100s/50s	0/0
Top score	17
Catches/stumpings	0/–
- Source: CricketArchive, 14 March 2022

Babette van Teunenbroek (born 1960) is a Dutch former cricketer who played as a right-handed batter. She appeared in nine One Day Internationals for the Netherlands between 1984 and 1989, and one One Day Internationals for International XI at the 1982 World Cup. She played club cricket for the Amsterdamsche Cricket Club (ACC) and the Haarlemsche Cricket Club Rood en Wit (R&W).

Van Teunenbroek debuted for the Netherlands on its 1981 tour of England, although the team faced only regional sides on that tour. The following year, she was one of two Dutchwomen (alongside Ingrid van der Elst) to be selected in the International XI squad for the 1982 World Cup in New Zealand, a composite team featuring players from several different countries. However, despite playing in two warm-up games, she was only selected for the last game of the tournament, against India. On her ODI debut, she scored 16 runs from tenth in the batting order, featuring in a 39-run ninth-wicket partnership with Australian Lynley Hamilton. Van Teunenbroek again toured England with the Netherlands in 1982, and the following year she made her international debut, appearing against Denmark, Ireland, and a "Young Netherlands" side in the one-off Centenary Tournament at Utrecht's Sportpark Maarschalkerweerd. Her best performance there was 38* against Ireland.

In 1984, the Dutch team played its first ODI, a one-off game against New Zealand for the 50th anniversary of the Nederlandse Dames Cricket Bond. The only Netherlands player with prior ODI experience, van Teunenbroek scored 14 runs batting third in the Dutch innings of 117/9. She did not play ODIs again until 1988, but did feature in a European quadrangular tournament in Dublin in 1986, scoring a half-century against Ireland. At the 1988 World Cup in Australia, van Teunenbroek featured in six of her side's eight matches, but like the rest of the batting line-up, struggled immensely. She finished with only 40 runs from her six innings, and passed double figures only once, with 17 against England. Van Teunenbroek played her final ODIs at the 1989 European Championship in Denmark.
