= Ingrid van der Elst =

Dutch cricketer (born 1955)

Personal information
- Full name: Ingrid van der Elst
- Born: 4 May 1955 (age 71); Bilthoven, Netherlands
- Batting: Right-handed
- Bowling: Right-arm off break
- Role: All-rounder; occasional wicket-keeper

International information
- National side: International XI (1982)
- ODI debut (cap 25): 12 January 1982 v New Zealand
- Last ODI: 6 February 1982 v India

Domestic team information
- Years: Team
- 1984/85–1986/87: Wellington

Career statistics
Competition	WODI	WFC
Matches	7	13
Runs scored	28	682
Batting average	5.60	40.11
100s/50s	0/0	0/7
Top score	16*	71*
Balls bowled	–	24
Wickets	–	2
Bowling average	–	6.50
5 wickets in innings	–	0
10 wickets in match	–	0
Best bowling	–	2/13
Catches/stumpings	3/1	0/3
- Source: CricketArchive, 14 March 2022

Ingrid van der Elst (born 4 May 1955) is a Dutch former sportswoman who represented her country in both cricket and field hockey. In hockey, she was a goalkeeper for the Dutch national indoor team, while in cricket she played as a right-handed batter, right-arm off break bowler and occasional wicket-keeper, and represented both the Netherlands and International XI, playing seven One Day Internationals for the latter team at the 1982 Women's Cricket World Cup. She played domestic cricket for Wellington.

== Sporting career ==
Born in Bilthoven, Utrecht Province, van der Elst is first recorded as playing cricket for her country in 1977, when the Dutch team toured England. All of her early matches for the Netherlands were played against regional and underage English teams, as the side was not yet judged competitive enough for full internationals. At the 1982 World Cup in New Zealand, van der Elst was one of two Dutch players (alongside Babette van Teunenbroek) to be selected for International XI, a composite team featuring players from several different countries. All seven of her ODI matches were played in the World Cup. Van der Elst was the team's number-three batter for the first five matches, but after a run of three consecutive ducks (against England, Australia, and New Zealand), she was pushed down the order for the rest of the tournament. Her best score was 16* in the second game against Australia, made from number seven, and she finished the tournament with 28 runs at an average of 5.60. Despite being a regular bowler for the Netherlands, van der Elst did not bowl at all in the World Cup, and in her last game, against India, was asked to keep wicket in place of Chris Miller, going on to effect a stumping off the bowling of Gill McConway.

In 1983, van der Elst played her first recorded internationals for the Netherlands, appearing against Denmark, Ireland, and "Young Netherlands" in the one-off Centenary Tournament at Utrecht's Sportpark Maarschalkerweerd. Her tournament included scores of 43 against Ireland and 70 against Denmark, the latter made from a team total of only 116. Later in 1983, van der Elst moved to New Zealand. For three seasons (1984–85, 1985–86, and 1986–87), she played for Wellington in the Hansells Cup, and was also a member of the New Zealand national squad (without playing any matches).

== Other activities ==
Van der Elst later returned to the Netherlands from New Zealand and continued to play club cricket and hockey for several more decades. Outside of her playing career, she worked as a sportswriter – in New Zealand she wrote for The Evening Post and The Dominion Post, and in the Netherlands for the Algemeen Nederlands Persbureau (ANP) news agency and certain regional publications. She has also worked in administrative positions for the Koninklijke Nederlandse Cricket Bond (KNCB), the governing body of Dutch cricket.
