= List of tied Women's Twenty20 Internationals =

A Women's Twenty20 International is a 20 overs-per-side cricket match played in a maximum of 150 minutes between two of the top 10 ranked countries of the International Cricket Council (ICC) in terms of women's cricket. The first women's Twenty20 International match was held in August 2004 between England and New Zealand, six months before the first Twenty20 International match was played between two men's teams. A Twenty20 International can have three possible results: it can be won by one of the two teams, it could be tied, or it could be declared to have "no result". For a match to finish as a tie, both teams must have scored the same number of runs. The number of wickets lost is not considered. Although such matches are recorded as ties, a tiebreak is played; prior to December 2008, this was a bowl-out, and since then it has been a Super Over.

The first tied women's T20I occurred on 18 October 2006, between New Zealand and the Australia, hosted at Allan Border Field in Brisbane. Australia won the resulting bowl-out, and were awarded two points, the equivalent of a win. This is the only women's T20I match to be decided by bowl-out. The next tie, involving England and Australia, happened during the group stages of the 2010 ICC Women's World Twenty20. This was the first instance of Super Over in a women's international. Both Australia and England scored 6 runs in their extra over. However, as Australia has hit more sixes (1, compared to England's 0), they have declared winner of the match.

On 4 September 2019, a T20I between Nigeria and Rwanda ended in a tie. However, Nigeria team refused to play the super over and Rwanda was declared the winners.

As of 18 June 2026, there have been 21 tied women's Twenty20 Internationals. West Indies have played in the most, six, and on three of those instances they were facing Pakistan. Only one tie has occurred during ICC Women's World Twenty20 tournaments.

== Tied matches ==
†	Tied match occurred in a T20 World Cup match

Tied Women's Twenty20 Internationals
#	Date	First innings	Second innings	Venue	Result	Ref
1	18 October 2006	New Zealand; 141/7 (20 overs)	Australia; 141/5 (20 overs)	Allan Border Field, Brisbane	Match tied Australia won bowl-out, 2–1	
2	5 May 2010 †	England; 104 (17.3 overs)	Australia; 104 (19.4 overs)	Warner Park, Basseterre	Match tied Super over score 6/2 - 6/2; Australia won by count of 6's	
3	11 September 2011	West Indies; 72/9 (20 overs)	Pakistan; 72 (20 overs)	Providence Stadium, Guyana	Match tied West Indies won Super Over, 10/1 – 7/1	
4	24 October 2013	West Indies; 118/7 (20 overs)	England; 118/7 (20 overs)	Kensington Oval, Bridgetown	Match tied West Indies won Super Over, 9/0 – 6/1	
5	27 September 2014	New Zealand; 111/4 (20 overs)	West Indies; 111/8 (20 overs)	Arnos Vale Stadium, Kingstown	Match tied New Zealand won Super Over, 7/0 – 5/2	
6	1 November 2015	West Indies; 88 (19.5 overs)	Pakistan; 77 (17 overs) (Note: Due to rain interruption during Pakistan innings, revised target for Pakistan was set as 78 in 17 overs.)	National Cricket Stadium, St. George's	Match tied West Indies won Super Over, 6/1 – 3/2	
7	14 July 2018	Netherlands; 146/3 (20 overs)	United Arab Emirates; 146/9 (20 overs)	VRA Cricket Ground, Amstelveen	Match tied UAE won Super Over, 6/2 – 5/2	
8	1 February 2019	Pakistan; 132/4 (20 overs)	West Indies; 132/6 (20 overs)	Southend Club Cricket Stadium, Karachi	Match tied West Indies won Super Over, 18/0 – 1/2	
9	27 June 2019	Scotland; 96 (18.5 overs)	Netherlands; 96/7 (20 overs)	La Manga Club, Murcia	Match tied Scotland won Super Over, 8/0 – 7/0	
10	4 September 2019	Nigeria; 105/2 (20 overs)	Rwanda; 105/6 (20 overs)	Rwanda Cricket Stadium, Kigali City	Match tied Rwanda won the match as Nigeria refused to play super-over	
11	1 February 2020	England; 156/4 (20 overs)	Australia; 156/8 (20 overs)	Manuka Oval, Canberra	Match tied England won Super Over, 10/0 – 8/0	
12	5 October 2022	New Zealand; 111/4 (20 overs)	West Indies; 111/9 (20 overs)	Sir Vivian Richards Stadium, Antigua	Match tied New Zealand won Super Over, 18/0 – 15/0	
13	30 October 2022	Hong Kong; 101/7 (20 overs)	Japan; 101/7 (20 overs)	Kaizuka Cricket Ground, Kaizuka	Match tied Hong Kong won Super Over, 4/2 – 5/0	
14	11 December 2022	Australia; 187/1 (20 overs)	India; 187/5 (20 overs)	DY Patil Stadium, Navi Mumbai	Match tied India won Super Over, 20/1 – 16/1	
15	28 May 2023	Hong Kong; 72 (17 overs)	China; 72/9 (20 overs)	Pingfeng Campus Cricket Field, Hangzhou	Match tied Hong Kong won Super Over, 15/0 – 4/2	
16	15 June 2023	Kenya; 82/8 (20 overs)	Botswana; 82/7 (20 overs)	Gahanga Cricket Stadium, Kigali	Match tied Kenya won Super Over, 9/0 – 10/0	
17	31 March 2024	Zimbabwe; 119/6 (20 overs)	Papua New Guinea; 119/6 (20 overs)	Harare Sports Club, Harare	Match tied Papua New Guinea won Super Over, 7/0 – 6/0	
18	17 November 2024	Costa Rica; 110/8 (20 overs)	Mexico; 110 (20 overs)	Reforma Athletic Club, Naucalpan	Match tied Mexico won Super Over, 8/0 – 5/1	
19	14 March 2025	France; 77/9 (20 overs)	Fiji; 77/9 (20 overs)	N'Du Stadium, Nouméa	Match tied First super over tied, 8/0 - 8/0; Fiji won 2nd Super Over, 5/0 - 4/1	
20	9 May 2026	China; 85 (18.2 overs)	Malaysia; 85/8 (20 overs)	Mission Road Ground, Mong Kok	Match tied China won Super Over, 9/0 – 8/1	
21	18 June 2026	Rwanda; 125/8 (20 overs)	Brazil; 125/8 (20 overs)	Gahanga B Ground, Kigali	Match tied Brazil won Super Over, 15/0 – 8/0	
22	22 July 2026	Namibia; 123/7 (20 overs)	Uganda; 123/7 (20 overs)	High Performance Oval, Windhoek	Match tied Namibia won Super Over, 13/0 – 12/1	

== Count by country ==
Teams involved in most Tied WT20I
Teams	No. of Tied Matches
West Indies	6
Australia	4
England	3
New Zealand	3
Pakistan	3
China	2
Hong Kong	2
Netherlands	2
Rwanda	2
Botswana	1
Brazil	1
Costa Rica	1
France	1
Fiji	1
India	1
Japan	1
Kenya	1
Malaysia	1
Mexico	1
Namibia	1
Nigeria	1
Papua New Guinea	1
Scotland	1
Uganda	1
United Arab Emirates	1
Zimbabwe	1

== See also ==
- List of tied Women's One Day Internationals
- Tied Test
- List of tied Twenty20 Internationals
- List of tied One Day Internationals
