= Karen Jobling =

English cricketer (born 1962)

Personal information
- Full name: Karen Jobling
- Born: 13 April 1962 (age 64); Ripon, Yorkshire, England
- Role: Bowler

International information
- National sides: International XI (1982); England (1987)
- Only Test (cap 104): 1 August 1987; England v Australia
- ODI debut (cap 18/45): 12 January 1982; International XI v New Zealand
- Last ODI: 25 July 1987; England v Australia

Domestic team information
- Years: Team
- 1980–1993: Yorkshire

Career statistics
Competition	WTest	WODI	WFC	WLA
Matches	1	10	5	38
Runs scored	6	7	6	79
Batting average	3.00	2.33	2.00	7.90
100s/50s	0/0	0/0	0/0	0/0
Top score	5	4*	5	26*
Balls bowled	66	444	642	1,714
Wickets	0	6	5	43
Bowling average	–	40.50	62.40	20.95
5 wickets in innings	–	0	0	0
10 wickets in match	–	0	0	0
Best bowling	–	2/16	2/29	4/22
Catches/stumpings	1/–	1/–	3/–	7/–
- Source: CricketArchive, 21 February 2021

Karen Jobling (born 13 April 1962) is an English former cricketer who played primarily as a bowler. She appeared in 1 Test match and 2 One Day Internationals for England, and 8 ODIs for International XI at the 1982 World Cup. She played domestic cricket for Yorkshire.
