= Renuka Majumder =

Indian cricketer (born 1962)

Personal information
- Full name: Renuka Majumder
- Born: 15 September 1962 (age 64); India
- Batting: Right-handed
- Bowling: Right-arm medium
- Role: All-rounder

International information
- National side: International XI (1982)
- ODI debut (cap 20): 12 January 1982 v New Zealand
- Last ODI: 4 February 1982 v England

Domestic team information
- Years: Team
- 1986/87: Delhi

Career statistics
Competition	WODI	WLA
Matches	6	14
Runs scored	24	155
Batting average	12.00	19.37
100s/50s	0/0	0/0
Top score	11	36
Balls bowled	282	432
Wickets	3	12
Bowling average	59.66	25.25
5 wickets in innings	0	1
10 wickets in match	0	0
Best bowling	1/11	5/17
Catches/stumpings	1/–	2/–
- Source: CricketArchive, 14 March 2022

Renuka Majumder (born 15 September 1962) is an Indian former cricketer who played as a right-arm medium bowler and right-handed batter. She appeared in six One Day Internationals for International XI at the 1982 World Cup. She played domestic cricket for Delhi.
