= Denise Martin (disambiguation) =

Denise Martin is a cricketer.

Denise Martin may also refer to:

- Denise Martin, American contestant of Survivor: China
- Denise Martin (curler), Canadian curler who participated in the 2001 Canadian Olympic Curling Trials
- Denise Martin, wife and manager of Eric Martin (American singer)
