= Maureen Peters =

Maureen Peters may refer to:

- Maureen Peters (novelist) (1935–2008), historical novelist
- Maureen Peters (cricketer) (born 1943), New Zealand cricketer
