= Jan Hall (cricketer) =

New Zealand cricketer

Personal information
- Full name: Jan Louise Hall
- Born: 21 November 1958 (age 67); Mosgiel, Otago, New Zealand
- Batting: Right-handed
- Bowling: Right-arm medium
- Role: Bowler

International information
- National side: International XI (1982)
- ODI debut (cap 15): 12 January 1982 v New Zealand
- Last ODI: 6 February 1982 v India

Domestic team information
- Years: Team
- 1974/75–1982/83: Otago
- 1984/85: Southern Districts
- 1998/99–2000/01: Otago

Career statistics
Competition	WODI	WFC	WLA
Matches	11	33	43
Runs scored	46	629	332
Batting average	4.18	13.97	9.22
100s/50s	0/0	0/3	0/0
Top score	15	66	31
Balls bowled	456	1,292	1,806
Wickets	5	27	29
Bowling average	51.00	28.76	34.89
5 wickets in innings	0	0	0
10 wickets in match	0	0	0
Best bowling	2/28	3/39	4/23
Catches/stumpings	1/–	9/–	5/–
- Source: CricketArchive, 14 March 2022

Jan Louise Hall (born 21 November 1958) is a New Zealand former cricketer who played primarily as a right-arm medium bowler. She appeared in 11 One Day Internationals for International XI at the 1982 World Cup. She played domestic cricket for Otago and Southern Districts.
