= List of International XI women ODI cricketers =

This is a list of International XI women One Day International (ODI) cricketers. Overall, 27 players played in at least one Women's One Day International for International XI. An ODI is an international cricket match between two teams, each having ODI status, as determined by the International Cricket Council.

International XI featured at the 1973 and 1982 Women's Cricket World Cups, including the best players from around the world that were not already appearing for their country in the tournament. Only one player, Sue Rattray, appeared in both tournaments for the team.

== Key ==
General

- ‡ – Captain
- † – Wicket-keeper
- First – Year of debut
- Last – Year of latest game
- Mat: number of matches played
- Win% – Winning percentage

Batting
Runs: number of runs scored by batsman/off bowler's bowling
HS: highest score
Avg: batting average
*: an innings that ended not out

Bowling
Balls: number of balls bowled
Wkt: number of wickets taken
BBI: best bowling figures
Avg: bowling average
Fielding
Ca: number of catches taken
St: number of stumpings made

== Players ==
Players listed below may have also played One Day International cricket for their respective national teams; only their record for International XI is shown. This list is arranged in the order in which each player won her first ODI cap.

Cap	Name	First	Last	Mat	Batting			Bowling				Fielding	
Cap	Name	First	Last	Mat	Runs	HS	Avg	Balls	Wkt	BBI	Ave	Ca	St
1	Eileen Badham	1973	1973	6	86	51	28.66	351	7	4/19	18.85	5	0
2	Donna Carmino	1973	1973	1	0	0	0.00	0	–	–	–	0	0
3	Audrey Disbury ‡	1973	1973	6	100	44	20.00	0	–	–	–	0	0
4	Gloria Farrell	1973	1973	5	9	8*	–	255	6	2/18	20.33	0	0
5	Margaret Jude †	1973	1973	5	22	17*	7.33	0	–	–	–	3	0
6	Paulette Lynch	1973	1973	4	1	1*	–	192	4	3/34	25.00	1	0
7	Betty McDonald	1973	1973	6	22	10*	22.00	354	4	2/33	34.50	0	0
8	Trish McKelvey	1973	1973	6	106	54	21.20	0	–	–	–	1	0
9	Sue Rattray	1973	1982	15	271	68	20.84	702	15	4/33	23.66	3	0
10	Lynette Smith	1973	1973	6	73	29	14.60	0	–	–	–	2	0
11	Wendy Williams	1973	1973	6	27	18	13.50	360	6	3/20	26.66	0	0
12	Pamela Crain	1973	1973	4	53	22	17.66	120	0	–	–	0	0
13	Cathy Garlick †	1973	1973	2	22	22	22.00	0	–	–	–	2	0
14	Valerie Farrell	1973	1973	2	52	52*	–	0	–	–	–	0	0
15	Jan Hall	1982	1982	11	46	15	4.18	456	5	2/28	51.00	1	0
16	Lynley Hamilton	1982	1982	9	83	29*	13.83	546	4	2/29	60.75	3	0
17	Mary Harris †	1982	1982	12	85	27*	9.44	0	–	–	–	3	0
18	Karen Jobling	1982	1982	8	7	4*	2.33	384	5	2/16	38.40	1	0
19	Rhonda Kendall	1982	1982	12	149	30	12.41	186	4	4/48	37.00	1	0
20	Renuka Majumder	1982	1982	6	24	11	12.00	282	3	1/11	60.33	1	0
21	Gillian McConway	1982	1982	12	45	10	4.50	430	4	1/31	74.25	2	0
22	Chris Miller †	1982	1982	10	88	21	8.80	0	–	–	–	3	0
23	Jenny Owens	1982	1982	12	95	21*	10.55	756	12	4/13	28.58	5	0
24	Lynne Thomas ‡	1982	1982	12	383	70*	38.30	0	–	–	–	3	0
25	Ingrid van der Elst †	1982	1982	7	28	16*	5.60	0	–	–	–	3	1
26	Sandra Braganza	1982	1982	11	29	11	4.83	594	15	4/24	20.26	1	0
27	Babette van Teunenbroek	1982	1982	1	16	16	16.00	0	–	–	–	0	0

== Captains ==
No.	Name	First	Last	Mat	Won	Lost	Tied	No Result	Win%
1	Audrey Disbury	1973	1973	6	3	2	0	1	60.00%
2	Lynne Thomas	1982	1982	12	0	12	0	0	0.00%
