= Christina White =

Christina White may refer to:

- Christina White (murder victim) (1967–?), American girl, a victim in the Lewis–Clark Valley murders
- M. Christina White, professor of chemistry

== See also ==
- Christine White (disambiguation)
