= David Abbott (cricket umpire) =

New Zealand cricket umpire

Personal information
- Full name: David William Abbott
- Born: 8 June 1934; Longbenton, Northumberland, England
- Died: 5 March 2016 (aged 81); Lower Hutt, New Zealand

Umpiring information
- WODIs umpired: 1 (1982)
- FC umpired: 1 (1977–78)

David William Abbott (8 June 1934 – 5 March 2016) was a New Zealand cricket umpire.

Born in Longbenton, Northumberland, England, in 1934, Abbott moved to Wellington, New Zealand, where he was a cricket umpire for over 50 years. He stood in a single One Day International at the 1982 Women's Cricket World Cup, between India and the International XI, and one first-class match, between Wellington and Canterbury, in the 1977–78 season.

Abbott died of cancer in Lower Hutt on 5 March 2016.
