= Lee Albon =

Australian cricketer (born 1959)

Personal information
- Full name: Leanne Margaret Albon
- Born: 7 November 1959 (age 67); Melbourne, Victoria, Australia
- Batting: Right-handed
- Bowling: Right-arm medium

International information
- National side: Australia
- ODI debut (cap 32): 20 January 1982 v International XI
- Last ODI: 4 February 1982 v India

Career statistics
Competition	ODI
Matches	4
Runs scored	38
Batting average	12.66
100s/50s	0/0
Top score	17*
Catches/stumpings	3/–
- Source: CricketArchive, 24 April 2014

Leanne Margaret Albon (born 7 November 1959) is an Australian former cricketer. She played four one day internationals for the Australia national women's cricket team in the 1980s.

Albon played as an opening bat with the Victorian state women's cricket team.
