= Christine White =

Christine White may refer to:

- Christine White (actress)
- Christine White (cricketer)
- Christine White (The 10th Kingdom)
