= Jenny Owens (cricketer) =

Australian cricketer (born 1963)

Personal information
- Full name: Jennifer Owens
- Born: 1 June 1963 (age 63); Subiaco, Perth, Australia
- Batting: Right-handed
- Bowling: Right-arm off break/leg break
- Role: Bowler

International information
- National sides: International XI (1982); Australia (1987)
- Test debut (cap 113): 1 August 1987; Australia v England
- Last Test: 29 August 1987; Australia v England
- ODI debut (cap 23/58): 12 January 1982; International XI v New Zealand
- Last ODI: 25 July 1987; Australia v England

Domestic team information
- Years: Team
- 1978/79–1987/88: Western Australia

Career statistics
Competition	WTest	WODI	WFC	WLA
Matches	3	15	30	44
Runs scored	26	95	257	187
Batting average	26.00	10.55	12.23	8.90
100s/50s	0/0	0/0	0/0	0/0
Top score	14	21*	38*	22*
Balls bowled	589	914	3,835	2,628
Wickets	14	19	91	65
Bowling average	13.78	21.78	13.97	16.36
5 wickets in innings	1	1	5	2
10 wickets in match	0	0	0	0
Best bowling	5/55	5/29	7/14	6/18
Catches/stumpings	0/–	5/–	8/–	14/–
- Source: CricketArchive, 14 March 2022

Jennifer Owens (born 1 June 1963) is an Australian former cricketer who played as a right-arm off break and leg break bowler. She appeared in three Test matches and three One Day Internationals for Australia in 1987, and 12 One Day Internationals for International XI at the 1982 World Cup. She played domestic cricket for Western Australia.
