= Chris Miller (cricketer) =

New Zealand cricketer

Personal information
- Full name: Chris Miller
- Batting: Right-handed
- Role: Wicket-keeper

International information
- National side: International XI (1982)
- ODI debut (cap 22): 12 January 1982 v New Zealand
- Last ODI: 31 January 1982 v New Zealand

Domestic team information
- Years: Team
- 1971/72–1981/82: North Shore

Career statistics
Competition	WODI	WFC	WLA
Matches	10	28	21
Runs scored	88	1,021	335
Batting average	8.80	26.86	16.75
100s/50s	0/0	0/8	0/2
Top score	21	96*	64
Balls bowled	–	12	–
Wickets	–	0	–
Bowling average	–	–	–
5 wickets in innings	–	0	–
10 wickets in match	–	0	–
Best bowling	–	–	–
Catches/stumpings	3/0	17/0	4/0
- Source: CricketArchive, 14 March 2022

Chris Miller is a New Zealand former cricketer who played as a wicket-keeper and right-handed batter. She appeared in 10 One Day Internationals for International XI at the 1982 World Cup. She played domestic cricket for North Shore.
