= Sue Rattray =

New Zealand cricketer (born 1953)

Personal information
- Full name: Susan Joy Rattray
- Born: 18 December 1953 (age 72); Christchurch, Canterbury, New Zealand
- Batting: Right-handed
- Bowling: Right-arm off break
- Role: All-rounder
- Relatives: Peter Rattray (brother)

International information
- National sides: International XI (1973–1982); New Zealand (1975–1985)
- Test debut (cap 66): 21 March 1975; New Zealand v Australia
- Last Test: 17 March 1985; New Zealand v India
- ODI debut (cap 9/21): 23 June 1973; International XI v England
- Last ODI: 24 March 1985; New Zealand v India

Domestic team information
- Years: Team
- 1966/67–1984/85: Canterbury
- 1985/86–1987/88: North Shore

Career statistics
Competition	WTest	WODI	WFC	WLA
Matches	9	30	94	61
Runs scored	412	576	2,482	844
Batting average	27.46	27.42	27.57	22.81
100s/50s	0/4	0/3	1/17	0/3
Top score	59	68	136*	68
Balls bowled	1,128	1,441	8,948	2,929
Wickets	19	26	270	70
Bowling average	24.26	29.00	11.82	18.17
5 wickets in innings	1	0	12	1
10 wickets in match	0	0	2	0
Best bowling	5/76	4/33	7/10	5/24
Catches/stumpings	1/–	4/–	43/–	10/–
- Source: CricketArchive, 11 November 2021

Susan Joy Rattray (born 18 December 1953) is a New Zealand former cricketer who played as an all-rounder, batting right-handed and bowling right-arm off break. She appeared in 9 Test matches and 15 One Day Internationals for New Zealand between 1975 and 1985. She also played 15 One Day Internationals for International XI at the two World Cups that they appeared at, in 1973 and 1982, and was the only player to appear for the side at both tournaments. She played domestic cricket for Canterbury and North Shore.
