= Karen Read (cricketer) =

Australian cricketer (born 1959)

Karen Read AM
Personal information
- Full name: Karen Read
- Born: 31 August 1959 (age 67); North Fremantle, Western Australia
- Batting: Right-handed
- Bowling: Right-arm medium
- Role: Batter

International information
- National side: Australia (1982–1986)
- Test debut (cap 97): 21 January 1984 v India
- Last Test: 25 January 1985 v England
- ODI debut (cap 33): 20 January 1982 v International XI
- Last ODI: 25 January 1986 v New Zealand

Domestic team information
- Years: Team
- 1975/76–1990/91: Western Australia

Career statistics
Competition	WTest	WODI	WFC	WLA
Matches	3	20	38	51
Runs scored	62	336	915	874
Batting average	15.50	21.00	27.78	21.85
100s/50s	0/0	0/1	0/6	0/4
Top score	21	56	75	75
Balls bowled	–	–	100	6
Wickets	–	–	0	0
Bowling average	–	–	–	–
5 wickets in innings	–	–	–	–
10 wickets in match	–	–	–	–
Best bowling	–	–	–	–
Catches/stumpings	0/–	4/–	8/–	10/–
- Source: CricketArchive, 26 January 2023

Karen Read AM (born 31 August 1959) is an Australian former cricketer who played as a right-handed batter. She appeared in three Test matches and 20 One Day Internationals for Australia. She played domestic cricket for Western Australia.

== Career ==
At state cricket level, Read played for Western Australia between 1975 and 1991. Read was a member of the Australian team that won the 1982 Women's Cricket World Cup.

In 2014, the Western Australian Cricket Association introduced the Karen Read Medal. In 2015, Read was made an honorary life member of the Western Australian Cricket Association. She also captained the Australia under-23 and under-25 teams.

Read has a doctorate in education. Read has been a secondary school principal since 2003. She is a committee member of the Western Australian Secondary School Executives Association. In those roles, Read promoted cricket in schools.

Read was appointed a Member of the Order of Australia in the 2025 Australia Day Honours for "significant service to cricket, and to secondary education".
