= Rhonda Kendall =

Australian cricketer (born 1962)

Personal information
- Full name: Rhonda Joy Kendall
- Born: 17 March 1962 (age 64); Perth, Western Australia
- Batting: Right-handed
- Bowling: Right-arm off break
- Role: All-rounder

International information
- National sides: International XI (1982); Australia (1987)
- ODI debut (cap 19/53): 12 January 1982; International XI v New Zealand
- Last ODI: 21 January 1987; Australia v New Zealand

Domestic team information
- Years: Team
- 1978/79–1991/92: Western Australia
- 1992/93–1993/94: South Australia

Career statistics
Competition	WODI	WFC	WLA
Matches	15	24	39
Runs scored	220	955	672
Batting average	15.71	41.52	21.67
100s/50s	0/0	1/8	0/3
Top score	40	130	60
Balls bowled	210	822	726
Wickets	4	16	13
Bowling average	41.00	13.31	30.38
5 wickets in innings	0	0	0
10 wickets in match	0	0	0
Best bowling	4/48	4/13	4/48
Catches/stumpings	1/–	7/–	5/–
- Source: CricketArchive, 14 March 2022

Rhonda Joy Kendall (born 17 March 1962) is an Australian former cricketer who played as an all-rounder, batting right-handed and bowling right-arm off break. She appeared in three One Day Internationals for Australia in 1987, and 12 One Day Internationals for International XI at the 1982 World Cup. She played domestic cricket for Western Australia and South Australia.
