= Terri Russell =

Australian cricketer (born 1954)

Personal information
- Full name: Terri Lynn Russell
- Batting: Right-handed
- Role: Wicket-keeper

International information
- National side: Australia
- ODI debut (cap 30): 10 January 1982 v India
- Last ODI: 7 February 1982 v England

Career statistics
Competition	ODI
Matches	13
Runs scored	0
Batting average	0
100s/50s	0/0
Top score	0
Catches/stumpings	8/11
- Source: CricInfo, 24 April 2014

Terri Lynn Russell (born 3 June 1954) is a former Australian cricket player. Russell played thirteen One Day Internationals for the Australia national women's cricket team. Her final WODI appearance was in the final of the 1982 Women's Cricket World Cup. She was born at Kalgoorlie in Western Australia.
