= List of tied Women's One Day Internationals =

A Women's One Day International (WODI) is a form of limited overs cricket, played between two teams that have international status, as determined by the International Cricket Council (ICC). A WODI can have four possible results—it can be won by either of the two teams, it could be tied, or it could be declared to have "no result". In cricket, a match is said to be tied if it ends with both teams scoring exactly the same number of runs and with the side batting second having completed its innings with all 10 batsmen being out or the predetermined number of overs having been completed. In case of rain-affected matches, the match is tied if the Duckworth–Lewis–Stern method indicates that the second team exactly meets but does not exceed the par score.

The first tie in ODIs occurred on 10 January 1982 when New Zealand played England in the 1982 Women's Cricket World Cup, with both teams scoring 147 runs in the 60-over match. In April 2021, the International Cricket Council (ICC) announced that all tied women's ODI matches would be decided by a Super Over. The first match to be decided by a Super Over or a tiebreaker was between the West Indies and South Africa, on 19 September 2021. Both teams had tied another match back in 2009, and thus are the first teams to face each other in multiple tied matches. South Africa has been involved in five tied WODI matches, the most for any team. The West Indies have won the most number of tied matches by Super Overs (2).

As of January 2024, there have been a total of 12 ties involving eight different teams in WODIs, of which 4 have been decided by a Super Over. So far, there have been no occasions in WODIs to have the winner of a tied match been decided by virtue of losing fewer wickets, which previously occurred in ODIs.

== Tied matches ==
Tied Women's One Day Internationals
No.	Date	Batting first	Batting second	Venue	Ref
1	10 January 1982	New Zealand; 147/9 (60 overs)	England; 147/8 (60 overs)	Cornwall Park, Auckland, New Zealand	
2	2 February 1982	Australia; 167/8 (60 overs)	England; 167 (60 overs)	Christ's College, Christchurch, New Zealand	
3	17 December 1997	India; 176/9 (50 overs)	New Zealand; 176 (49.1 overs)	Nehru Stadium, Indore, India	
4	23 October 2009	South Africa; 180/6 (50 overs)	West Indies; 180/8 (50 overs)	Newlands Cricket Ground, Cape Town, South Africa	
5	27 November 2016	Australia; 242 (49.5 overs)	South Africa; 242 (50 overs)	International Sports Stadium, Coffs Harbour, Australia	
6	12 May 2019	South Africa; 265/6 (50 overs)	Pakistan; 265/9 (50 overs)	Willowmoore Park, Benoni, South Africa	
7	19 September 2021	West Indies; 192/5 (50 overs)	South Africa; 192/7 (50 overs)	Sir Vivian Richards Stadium, North Sound, Antigua and Barbuda	
8	31 January 2022	South Africa; 160 (40.4 overs)	West Indies; 160 (37.4 overs)	Wanderers Stadium, Johannesburg, South Africa	
9	22 January 2023	Bangladesh; 225/4 (50 overs)	India; 225 (49.3 overs)	Sher-e-Bangla National Cricket Stadium, Dhaka, Bangladesh	
10	7 November 2023	Bangladesh; 169/9 (50 overs)	Pakistan; 169 (49.5 overs)	Sher-e-Bangla National Cricket Stadium, Dhaka, Bangladesh	
11	18 December 2023	New Zealand; 251/8 (50 overs)	Pakistan; 251/9 (50 overs)	Hagley Oval, Christchurch, New Zealand	
12	21 January 2024	Zimbabwe; 227/9 (50 overs)	Ireland; 202/9 (43 overs) (Note: The DLS target for Ireland was 203.)	Harare Sports Club, Harare, Zimbabwe	

== Tiebreakers ==
=== Super Over ===
Super Overs in Women's One Day Internationals
No.	Date	Batting first	Batting second	Venue	Result	Ref
1	19 September 2021	South Africa; 6/0 (1 over)	West Indies; 10/1 (1 over)	Sir Vivian Richards Stadium, North Sound, Antigua and Barbuda	West Indies won	
2	31 January 2022	West Indies; 25/0 (1 over)	South Africa; 17/1 (1 over)	Wanderers Stadium, Johannesburg, South Africa	West Indies won	
3	7 November 2023	Pakistan; 7/2 (0.5 over)	Bangladesh; 10/1 (1 over)	Sher-e-Bangla National Cricket Stadium, Dhaka, Bangladesh	Bangladesh won	
4	18 December 2023	Pakistan; 11/0 (1 over)	New Zealand; 8/2 (0.5 over)	Hagley Oval, Christchurch, New Zealand	Pakistan won	

== By teams ==
Teams involved in most number of tied ODI matches
Team	Matches
South Africa	5
New Zealand	3
Pakistan	3
West Indies	3
Australia	2
Bangladesh	2
England	2
India	2
Ireland	1
Zimbabwe	1

== See also ==
- List of tied One Day Internationals
- List of tied Women's Twenty20 Internationals
