= Helen Stother =

English cricketer (1955–2019)

Personal information
- Full name: Helen Joy Stother
- Born: 21 June 1955; Liverpool, Lancashire, England
- Died: 8 October 2019 (aged 64); Newport, Wales
- Batting: Right-handed
- Bowling: Right-arm medium
- Role: Bowler

International information
- National side: England (1982–1986)
- Test debut (cap 97): 27 July 1984 v New Zealand
- Last Test: 26 June 1986 v India
- ODI debut (cap 33): 14 January 1982 v International XI
- Last ODI: July 27 1986 v India

Domestic team information
- Years: Team
- 1976–1981: Sussex
- 1982–1989: Middlesex

Career statistics
| Competition | WTest | WODI | WFC | WLA |
|---|---|---|---|---|
| Matches | 7 | 12 | 20 | 46 |
| Runs scored | 70 | 11 | 156 | 182 |
| Batting average | 5.38 | 2.20 | 6.24 | 8.66 |
| 100s/50s | 0/0 | 0/0 | 0/0 | 0/0 |
| Top score | 20 | 7 | 21 | 31* |
| Balls bowled | 1,185 | 747 | 3,220 | 2,499 |
| Wickets | 15 | 5 | 30 | 38 |
| Bowling average | 30.66 | 72.80 | 39.00 | 29.47 |
| 5 wickets in innings | 0 | 0 | 0 | 0 |
| 10 wickets in match | 0 | 0 | 0 | 0 |
| Best bowling | 3/58 | 1/14 | 3/33 | 4/24 |
| Catches/stumpings | 1/– | 2/– | 6/– | 12/– |
- Source: CricketArchive, 23 February 2021

Helen Joy Stother (21 June 1955 – 8 October 2019) was an English cricketer and former member of the England women's cricket team who played as a right-arm medium bowler. She appeared in 7 Test matches and 12 One Day Internationals between 1982 and 1986. She played domestic cricket for Sussex and Middlesex.
