= Sandra Braganza =

Indian cricketer (born 1961)

Personal information
- Full name: Sandra Braganza
- Born: 30 November 1961 (age 64); Jalandhar, India
- Batting: Right-handed
- Bowling: Right-arm medium
- Role: Bowler

International information
- National sides: International XI (1982); India (1984–1993)
- Test debut (cap 25): 23 February 1985; India v New Zealand
- Last Test: 9 February 1991; India v Australia
- ODI debut (cap 26/20): 14 January 1982; International XI v England
- Last ODI: 20 July 1993; India v West Indies

Domestic team information
- Years: Team
- 1981/82–1983/84: Andhra
- 1985/86–1992/93: Railways

Career statistics
Competition	WTest	WODI	WFC	WLA
Matches	6	20	10	35
Runs scored	45	44	45	97
Batting average	15.00	6.28	15.00	10.77
100s/50s	0/0	0/0	0/0	0/0
Top score	19*	11	19*	28*
Balls bowled	450	1,014	576	1,206
Wickets	4	25	20	59
Bowling average	51.25	20.24	18.70	13.53
5 wickets in innings	0	0	1	1
10 wickets in match	0	0	0	0
Best bowling	2/35	4/24	5/45	5/30
Catches/stumpings	0/–	1/–	0/–	1/–
- Source: CricketArchive, 11 March 2022

Sandra Braganza (born 30 November 1961) is an Indian former cricketer who played as a right-arm medium bowler. She appeared in six Test matches and nine One Day Internationals (ODIs) for India between 1984 and 1993, as well as appearing in 11 ODIs for International XI at the 1982 World Cup. She played domestic cricket for Andhra and Railways.
