= Lynley Hamilton =

Australian cricketer (born 1959)

Personal information
- Full name: Lynley Hamilton
- Born: 12 May 1959 (age 67); Medindie, South Australia
- Batting: Right-handed
- Bowling: Right-arm medium
- Role: All-rounder

International information
- National side: International XI (1982)
- ODI debut (cap 16): 12 January 1982 v New Zealand
- Last ODI: 6 February 1982 v India

Domestic team information
- Years: Team
- 1980/81–1982/83: South Australia

Career statistics
| Competition | WODI | WFC | WLA |
|---|---|---|---|
| Matches | 9 | 11 | 19 |
| Runs scored | 83 | 116 | 175 |
| Batting average | 13.83 | 19.33 | 21.87 |
| 100s/50s | 0/0 | 0/0 | 0/1 |
| Top score | 29* | 34 | 52* |
| Balls bowled | 546 | 1,513 | 1,032 |
| Wickets | 4 | 23 | 20 |
| Bowling average | 59.25 | 19.26 | 16.50 |
| 5 wickets in innings | 0 | 0 | 0 |
| 10 wickets in match | 0 | 0 | 0 |
| Best bowling | 2/23 | 4/26 | 4/3 |
| Catches/stumpings | 3/– | 6/– | 3/– |
- Source: CricketArchive, 14 March 2022

Lynley Hamilton (born 12 May 1959) is an Australian former cricketer who played as a right-arm medium bowler and right-handed batter. She appeared in nine One Day Internationals for International XI at the 1982 World Cup. She played domestic cricket for South Australia.
