= Sharyn Hill =

Australian cricketer (born 1954)

Personal information
- Full name: Sharyn Anne Hill
- Born: 19 May 1954 (age 72); Melbourne, Australia
- Batting: Right-handed
- Bowling: Right-arm medium
- Role: All-rounder
- Relatives: Michael Hill (son)

International information
- National side: Australia (1978–1982)
- Test debut (cap 93): 12 January 1979 v New Zealand
- Last Test: 26 January 1979 v New Zealand
- ODI debut (cap 23): 1 January 1978 v New Zealand
- Last ODI: 7 February 1982 v England

Domestic team information
- Years: Team
- 1973/74–1983/84: Victoria

Career statistics
Competition	WTest	WODI	WFC	WLA
Matches	3	14	26	32
Runs scored	80	184	335	361
Batting average	20.00	20.44	15.22	19.00
100s/50s	0/0	0/1	0/0	0/2
Top score	38	76	41	76
Balls bowled	360	342	1,454	1,468
Wickets	4	9	37	27
Bowling average	13.50	12.11	11.51	19.40
5 wickets in innings	0	0	1	0
10 wickets in match	0	0	0	0
Best bowling	2/17	3/16	5/30	3/9
Catches/stumpings	3/–	5/–	5/–	6/–
- Source: CricketArchive, 2 February 2023

Sharyn Anne Hill (née Fitzsimmons; born 19 May 1954) is an Australian former cricketer who played as an all-rounder, batting right-handed and bowling right-arm medium. She appeared in three Test matches and 14 One Day Internationals for Australia between 1978 and 1982. Her final One Day International appearance was in the final of the 1982 Women's Cricket World Cup. She played domestic cricket for Victoria.

Her son, Michael, also played cricket, for Victoria amongst other teams.
