= Sue Brown (cricketer) =

New Zealand cricketer (born 1958)

Personal information
- Full name: Susan Helen Brown
- Born: 1 April 1958 (age 68); Christchurch, New Zealand
- Batting: Right-handed
- Bowling: Right-arm medium
- Role: Bowler

International information
- National side: New Zealand (1979–1986)
- Test debut (cap 71): 12 January 1979 v Australia
- Last Test: 27 July 1984 v England
- ODI debut (cap 26): 10 January 1982 v England
- Last ODI: 25 January 1986 v Australia

Domestic team information
- Years: Team
- 1973/74–1990/91: Canterbury

Career statistics
Competition	WTest	WODI	WFC	WLA
Matches	6	18	55	37
Runs scored	59	59	331	105
Batting average	9.83	11.80	13.24	11.66
100s/50s	0/0	0/0	0/0	0/0
Top score	19	17*	48*	17*
Balls bowled	1,306	1,020	11,994	1,828
Wickets	9	19	291	41
Bowling average	48.00	16.21	10.49	14.48
5 wickets in innings	0	0	25	0
10 wickets in match	0	0	6	0
Best bowling	3/64	2/3	8/34	4/21
Catches/stumpings	1/–	5/–	30/–	9/–
- Source: CricketArchive, 5 July 2021

Susan Helen Brown (née Teale; born 1 April 1958) is a New Zealand former cricketer who played as a right-arm medium bowler. She appeared in 6 Test matches and 18 One Day Internationals for New Zealand between 1979 and 1986. She played domestic cricket for Canterbury.
