= Vicki Burtt =

New Zealand cricketer (born 1958)

Personal information
- Full name: Vicki Louise Burtt
- Born: 29 January 1958 (age 68); Christchurch, New Zealand
- Batting: Right-handed
- Bowling: Right-arm medium
- Role: All-rounder
- Relatives: Leighton Burtt (son)

International information
- National side: New Zealand (1977–1982)
- Test debut (cap 68): 8 January 1977 v India
- Last Test: 26 January 1979 v Australia
- ODI debut (cap 16): 1 January 1978 v Australia
- Last ODI: 31 January 1982 v International XI

Domestic team information
- Years: Team
- 1970/71–1986/87: Canterbury

Career statistics
Competition	WTest	WODI	WFC	WLA
Matches	4	9	63	25
Runs scored	101	168	1,200	499
Batting average	12.62	21.00	18.75	26.26
100s/50s	0/0	0/0	0/5	0/2
Top score	39	46	83	78
Balls bowled	–	36	2,715	421
Wickets	–	2	41	14
Bowling average	–	15.50	23.60	14.64
5 wickets in innings	–	0	0	0
10 wickets in match	–	0	0	0
Best bowling	–	2/31	4/46	4/13
Catches/stumpings	5/–	4/–	24/–	8/–
- Source: CricketArchive, 13 July 2021

Vicki Louise Burtt (née McGregor; born 29 January 1958) is a New Zealand former cricketer who played as a right-handed batter and right-arm medium bowler. She appeared in 4 Test matches and 9 One Day Internationals for New Zealand between 1977 and 1982, and played at two World Cups. She played domestic cricket for Canterbury.

Her son, Leighton, played cricket for Canterbury from 2005–06 to 2009–10.
