= List of tied One Day Internationals =

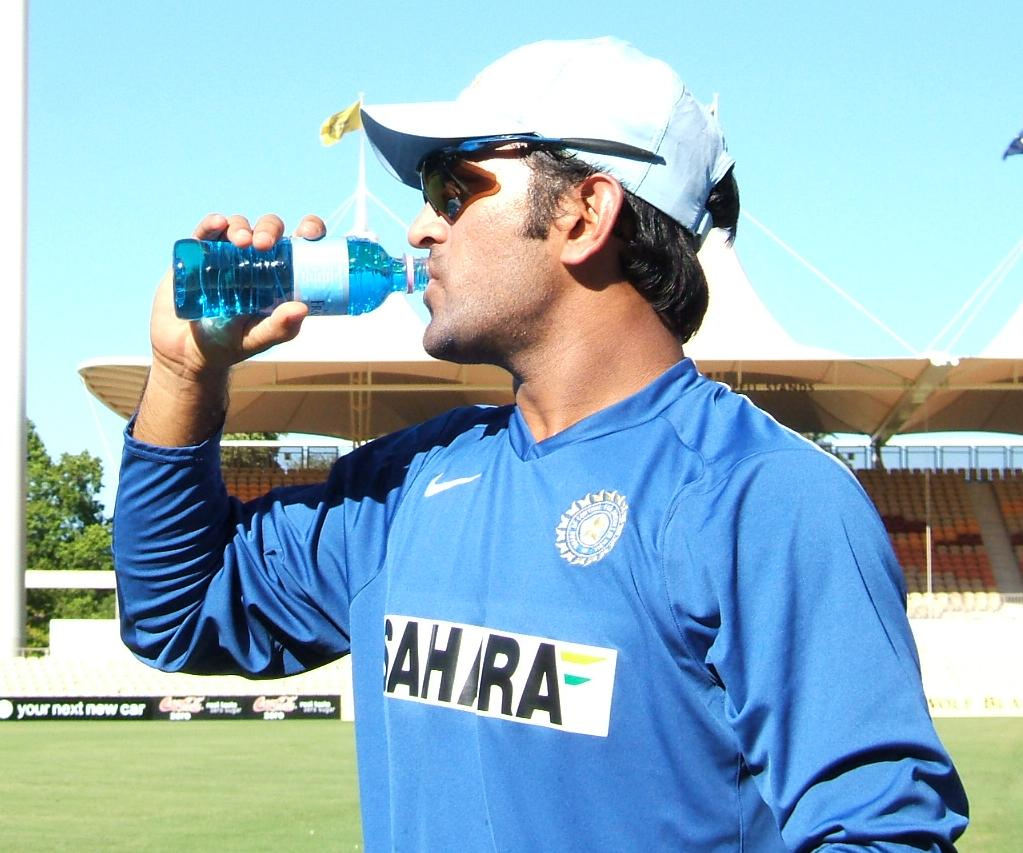
India's MS Dhoni is the only player to be involved in six ties in ODIs as player and five as captain.

A One Day International (ODI) is a form of limited overs cricket, played between two teams that have international status, as determined by the International Cricket Council (ICC). The first ODI match was played between Australia and England in 1971 at the Melbourne Cricket Ground, as a 40-over match. An ODI can have four possible results—it can be won by either of the two teams, it could be tied, or it could be declared to have "no result". In cricket, a match is said to be tied if it ends with both teams scoring exactly the same number of runs and with the side batting second having completed its innings with all 10 batsmen being out or the predetermined number of overs having been completed. In case of rain-affected matches, the match is tied if the Duckworth–Lewis–Stern method indicates that the second team exactly meets but does not exceed the par score. There have been two occasions where a match has been tied, but the team which had lost fewer wickets was declared the winner. Pakistan was involved in both matches, losing one against India and winning the other against Australia.

The first tie in ODIs occurred in 1984 when Australia played West Indies in the second final of the Benson and Hedges World Series Cup; the Wisden Cricketers' Almanack noted "[the match] led to more dissension than delight." The second tie, also involving Australia, occurred in 1989 during the second match of the Texaco Trophy in England. Between 1991 and 1997, at least one ODI was tied every year. Starting from 1999, a further 19 ties have occurred until 2014, more frequently than ever before. The first World Cup match involving a tie was the second semi-final of the 1999 tournament when Australia played South Africa. Since then, at least one match was tied in the subsequent tournaments, with the exception of the 2015 edition, until the 2019 World Cup.

As of August 2024, there have been a total of 44 ties in ODIs, including 3 which have been decided by a Super Over. Two other matches finished with the scores level but one side was declared to have won by virtue of losing fewer wickets; these are not recorded as tied matches.

== Tied ODIs ==
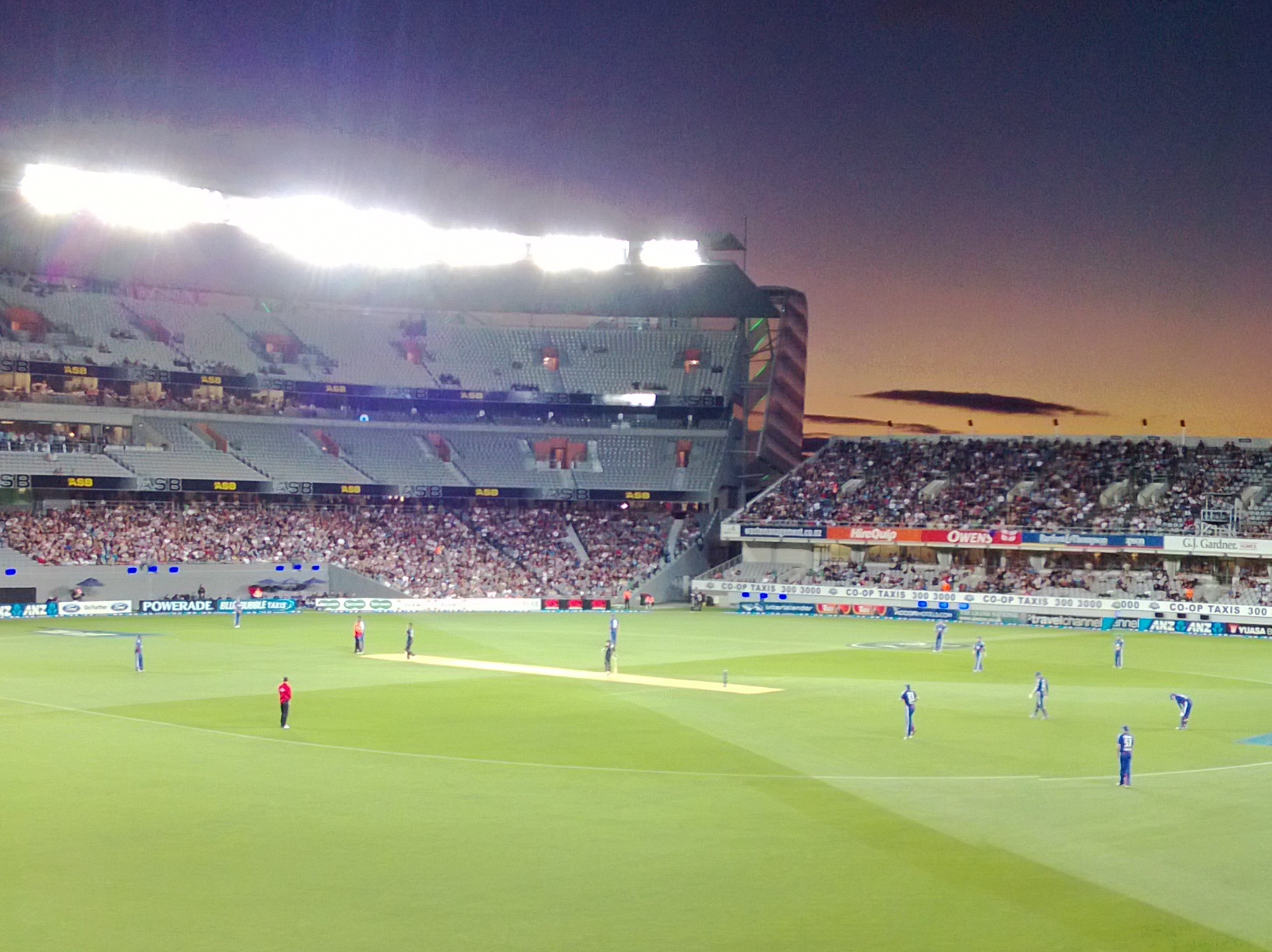
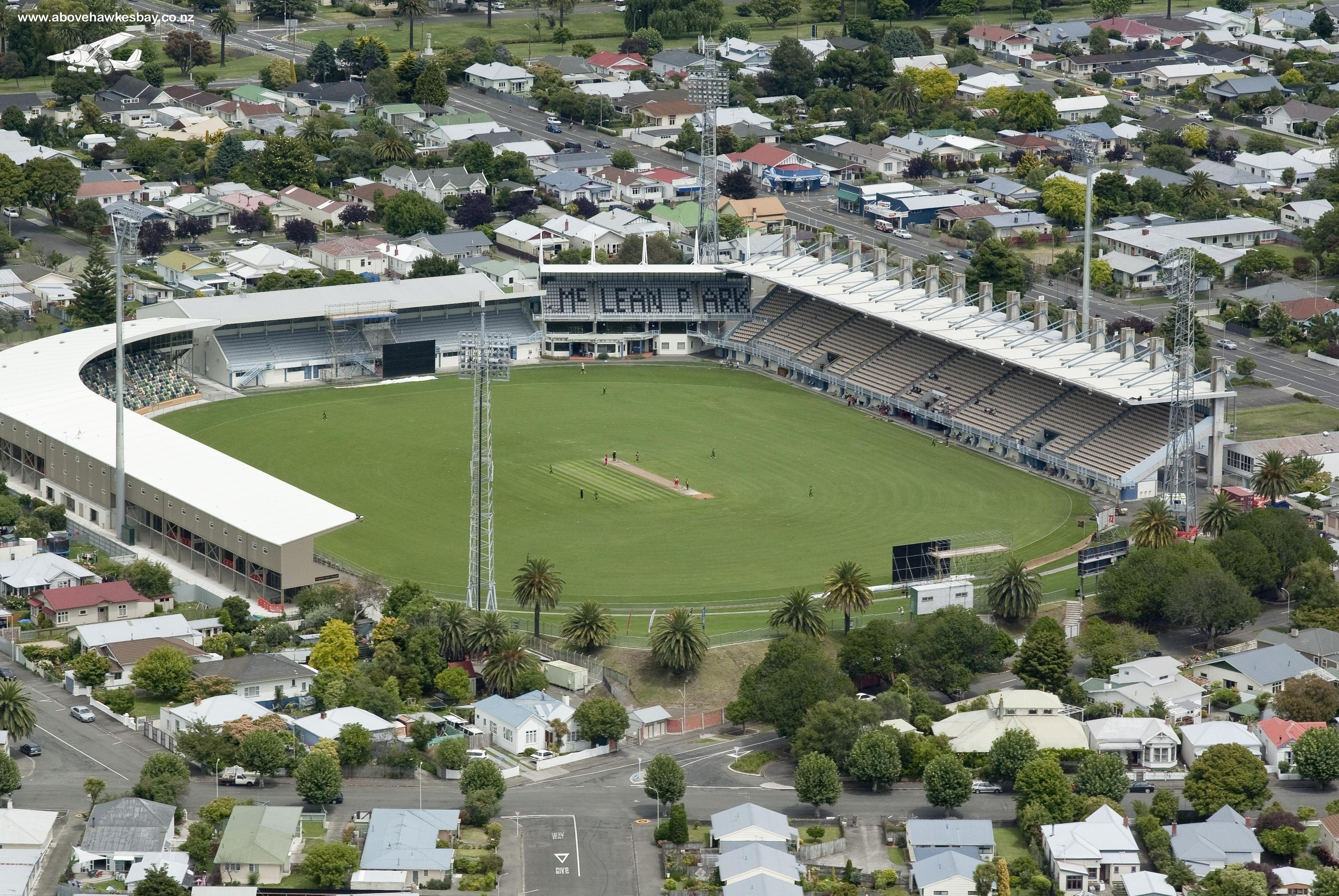
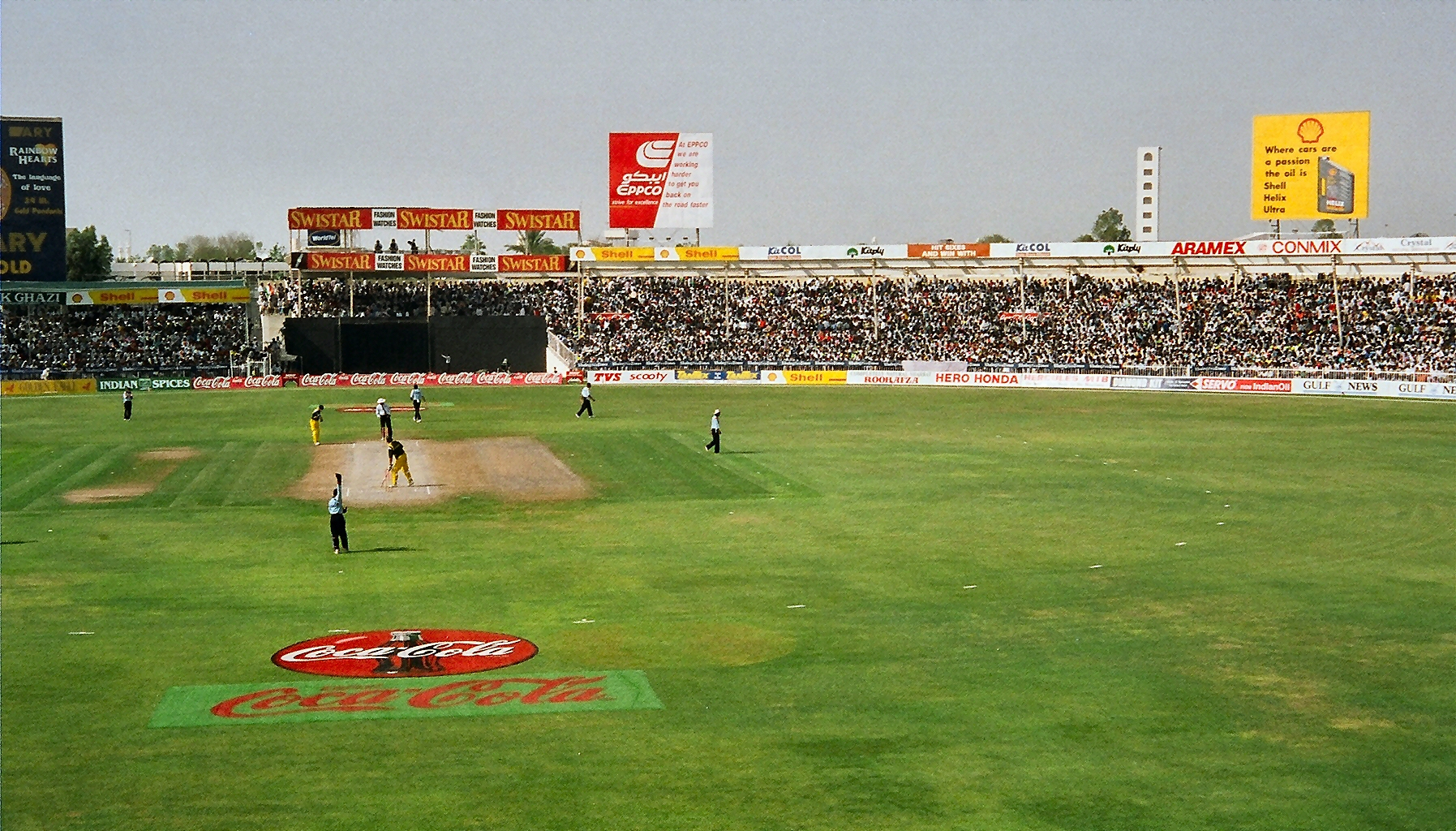
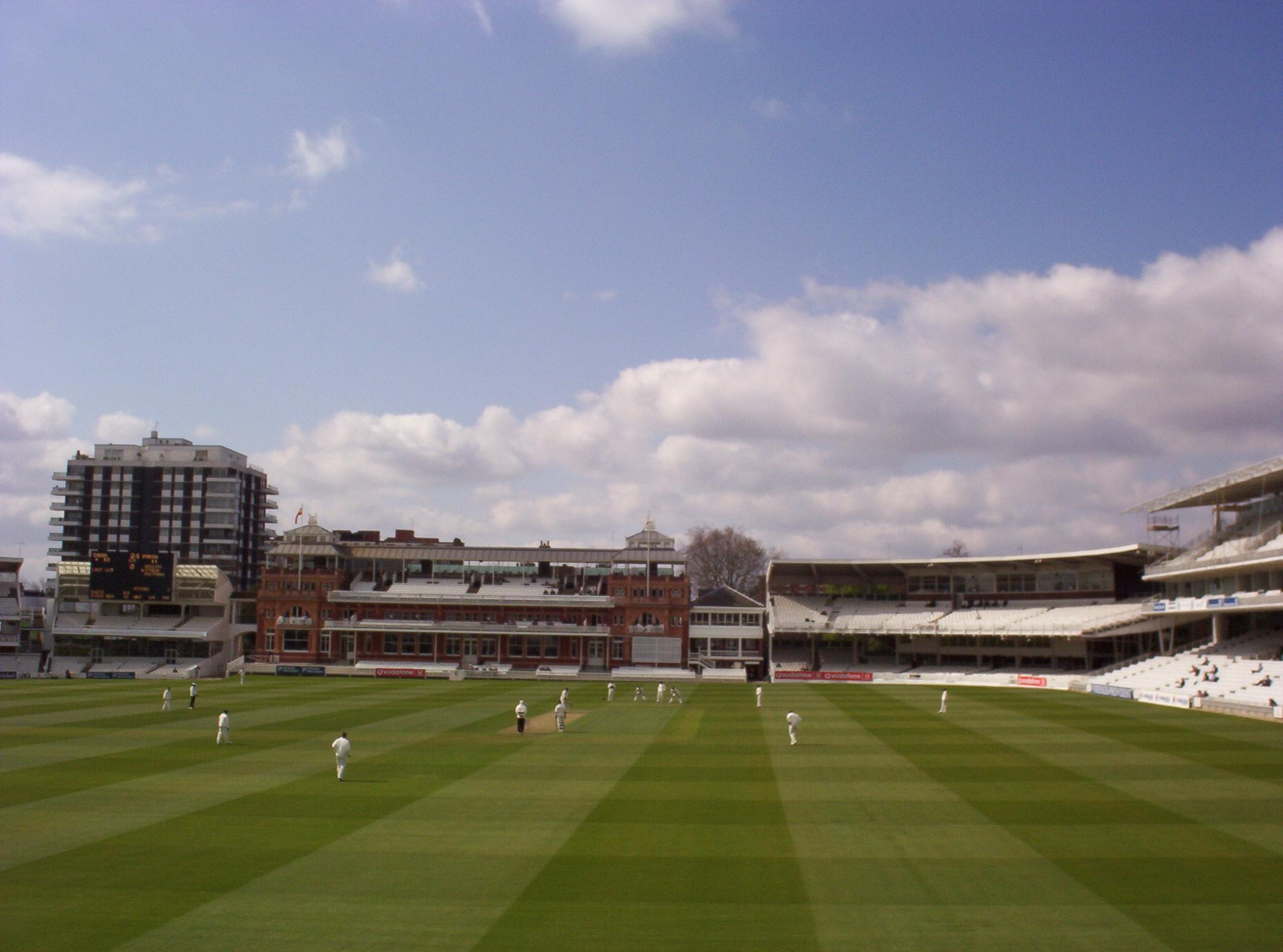
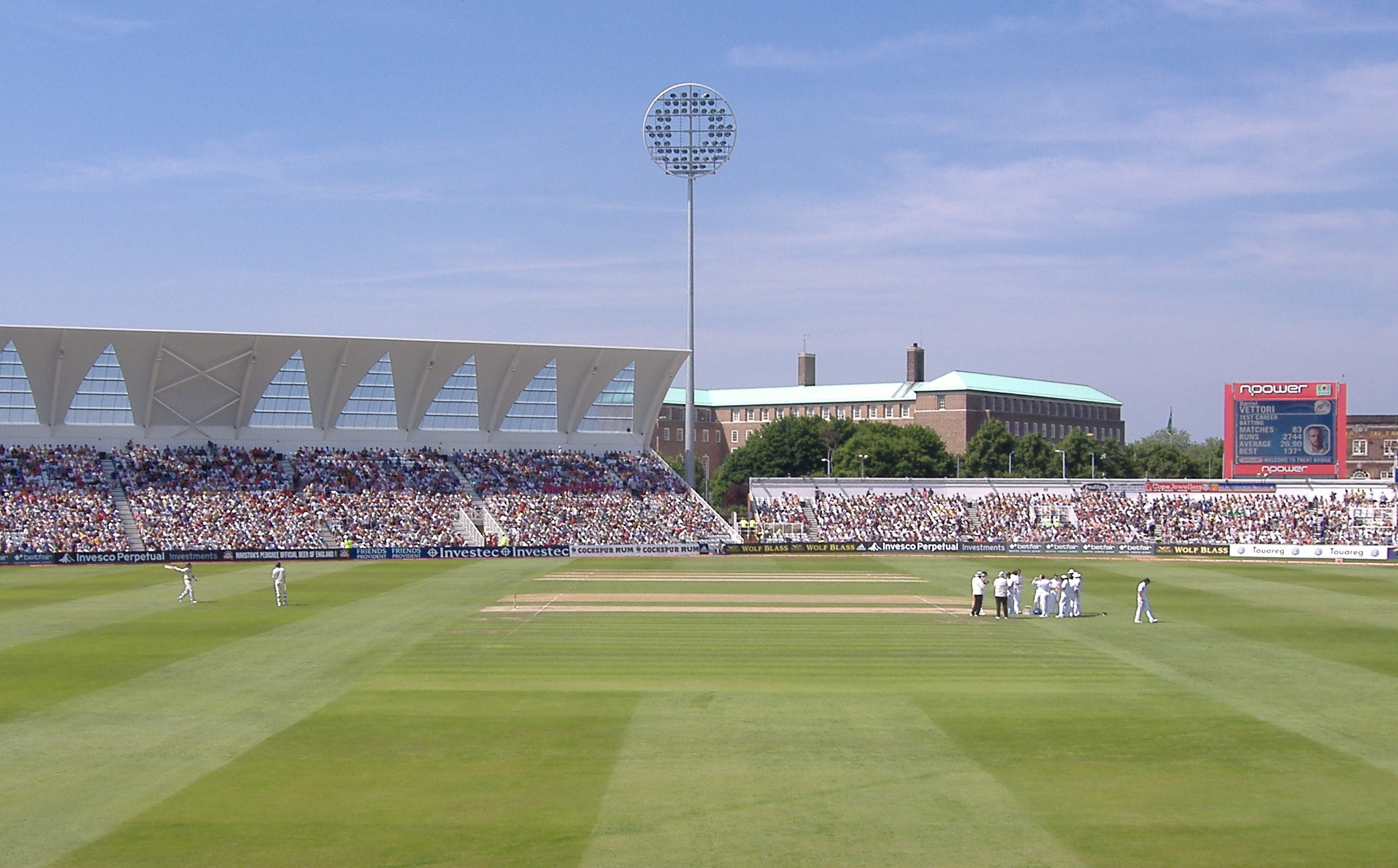
Eden Park, McLean Park, the Sharjah Cricket Stadium, Lord's and Trent Bridge (from top to bottom), all have hosted more than one tied ODI.

Key
Indicates a World Cup match

Tied One Day Internationals
No.	Date	Batting first	Batting second	Venue	Ref
1	11 February 1984	West Indies; 222/5 (50 overs)	Australia; 222/9 (50 overs)	Melbourne Cricket Ground, Melbourne, Australia	
2	27 May 1989	England; 226/5 (55 overs)	Australia; 226/8 (55 overs)	Trent Bridge, Nottingham, England	
3	22 November 1991	West Indies; 186/5 (39 overs)	Pakistan; 186/9 (39 overs)	Gaddafi Stadium, Lahore, Pakistan	
4	6 December 1991	India; 126 (47.4 overs)	West Indies; 126 (41 overs)	WACA Ground, Perth, Australia	
5	10 December 1992	Australia; 228/7 (50 overs)	Pakistan; 228/9 (50 overs)	Bellerive Oval, Hobart, Australia	
6	3 April 1993	Pakistan; 244/6 (50 overs)	West Indies; 244/5 (50 overs)	Bourda, Georgetown, Guyana	
7	18 November 1993	India; 248/4 (50 overs)	Zimbabwe; 248 (50 overs)	Nehru Stadium, Indore, India	
8	13 March 1994	Pakistan; 161/9 (50 overs)	New Zealand; 161 (49.4 overs)	Eden Park, Auckland, New Zealand	
9	22 February 1995	Zimbabwe; 219/9 (50 overs)	Pakistan; 219 (49.5 overs)	Harare Sports Club, Harare, Zimbabwe	
10	11 November 1996	New Zealand; 169/8 (50 overs)	Sri Lanka; 169 (48 overs)	Sharjah Cricket Stadium, Sharjah, United Arab Emirates	
11	27 January 1997	Zimbabwe; 236/8 (50 overs)	India; 236 (49.5 overs)	Boland Park, Paarl, South Africa	
12	26 February 1997	New Zealand; 237 (49.4 overs)	England; 237/8 (50 overs)	McLean Park, Napier, New Zealand	
13	1 October 1997	Zimbabwe; 233/8 (50 overs)	New Zealand; 233/9 (50 overs)	Queens Sports Club, Bulawayo, Zimbabwe	
14	21 April 1999	West Indies; 173/5 (30 overs)	Australia; 173/7 (30 overs)	Bourda, Georgetown, Guyana	
15	17 June 1999 †	Australia; 213 (49.2 overs)	South Africa; 213 (49.4 overs)	Edgbaston Cricket Ground, Birmingham, England	(Note: In the semi-final of the 1999 World Cup, Australia progressed to the final on the basis of finishing at a higher level than South Africa in the "Super Sixes" stage of the tournament.)
16	15 October 1999	Pakistan; 196 (49.4 overs)	Sri Lanka; 196 (49.1 overs)	Sharjah Cricket Stadium, Sharjah, United Arab Emirates	
17	18 August 2000	South Africa; 226/8 (50 overs)	Australia; 226/9 (50 overs)	Docklands Stadium, Melbourne, Australia	
18	27 March 2002	South Africa; 259/7 (50 overs)	Australia; 259/9 (50 overs)	Senwes Park, Potchefstroom, South Africa	
19	3 March 2003 †	Sri Lanka; 268/9 (50 overs)	South Africa; 229/6 (45 overs) (Note: In the pool match of the 2003 World Cup, the Duckworth–Lewis method was applied after rain had interrupted the play. The scores were tied after the penultimate ball, but unaware of this the batsmen did not attempt to score a run of the final ball of the over.)	Kingsmead Cricket Ground, Durban, South Africa	
20	2 February 2005	England; 270/5 (50 overs)	South Africa; 270/8 (50 overs)	Mangaung Oval, Bloemfontein, South Africa	
21	2 July 2005	Australia; 196 (48.5 overs)	England; 196/9 (50 overs)	Lord's, London, England	
22	15 March 2007 †	Ireland; 221/9 (50 overs)	Zimbabwe; 221 (50 overs)	Sabina Park, Kingston, Jamaica	
23	20 February 2008	England; 340/6 (50 overs)	New Zealand; 340/7 (50 overs)	McLean Park, Napier, New Zealand	
24	27 February 2011 †	India; 338 (49.5 overs)	England; 338/8 (50 overs)	M. Chinnaswamy Stadium, Bangalore, India	
25	11 September 2011	India; 280/5 (50 overs)	England; 270/8 (48.5 overs)	Lord's, London, England	(Note: The Duckworth–Lewis method was applied after rain had interrupted the play.)
26	14 February 2012	Sri Lanka; 236/9 (50 overs)	India; 236/9 (50 overs)	Adelaide Oval, Adelaide, Australia	
27	20 March 2012	Australia; 220 (49.5 overs)	West Indies; 220 (49.4 overs)	Sabina Park, Kingston, Jamaica	
28	23 May 2013	Pakistan; 266/5 (47 overs)	Ireland; 275/5 (47 overs)	Castle Avenue, Dublin, Ireland	(Note: The target for Ireland was revised to 276 runs in 47 overs per the Duckworth–Lewis method after rain had interrupted the first innings of the match after 47 overs.)
29	14 June 2013	South Africa; 230/6 (31 overs)	West Indies; 190/6 (26.1 overs)	Sophia Gardens, Cardiff, Wales	(Note: In a rain-curtailed match of 31 overs per side, the West Indies' score stood at 190 runs for the loss of 6 wickets when rain again interrupted the play in the 27th over. The Duckworth–Lewis method par score was 190, resulting in a tie.)
30	9 July 2013	Ireland; 268/5 (50 overs)	Netherlands; 268/9 (50 overs)	VRA Cricket Ground, Amstelveen, Netherlands	
31	19 July 2013	Pakistan; 229/6 (50 overs)	West Indies; 229/9 (50 overs)	Beausejour Stadium, Gros Islet, Saint Lucia	
32	25 January 2014	New Zealand; 314 (50 overs)	India; 314/9 (50 overs)	Eden Park, Auckland, New Zealand	
33	21 June 2016	Sri Lanka; 286/9 (50 overs)	England; 286/8 (50 overs)	Trent Bridge, Nottingham, England	
34	19 November 2016	Zimbabwe; 257 (50 overs)	West Indies; 257/8 (50 overs)	Queens Sports Club, Bulawayo, Zimbabwe	
35	12 March 2018	Zimbabwe; 210 (46.4 overs)	Scotland; 210 (49.1 overs)	Queens Sports Club, Bulawayo, Zimbabwe	
36	25 September 2018	Afghanistan; 252/8 (50 overs)	India; 252 (49.5 overs)	Dubai International Cricket Stadium, Dubai, United Arab Emirates	
37	24 October 2018	India; 321/6 (50 overs)	West Indies; 321/7 (50 overs)	ACA-VDCA Cricket Stadium, Visakhapatnam, India	
38	14 July 2019 †	New Zealand; 241/8 (50 overs)	England; 241 (50 overs)	Lord's, London, England	
39	2 November 2020	Zimbabwe; 278/6 (50 overs)	Pakistan; 278/9 (50 overs)	Rawalpindi Cricket Stadium, Rawalpindi, Pakistan	
40	8 February 2022	Oman; 214 (49.3 overs)	United Arab Emirates; 214 (50 overs)	Oman Cricket Academy Ground Turf 1, Muscat, Oman	
41	11 June 2022	Nepal; 274 (49.2 overs)	United States; 274/6 (50 overs)	Moosa Stadium, Pearland, USA	
42	11 September 2022	United States; 205 (47 overs)	Papua New Guinea; 205 (49.5 overs)	Amini Park, Port Moresby, Papua New Guinea	
43	26 June 2023	West Indies; 374/6 (50 overs)	Netherlands; 374/9 (50 overs)	Takashinga Sports Club, Harare, Zimbabwe	
44	2 August 2024	Sri Lanka; 230/8 (50 overs)	India; 230 (47.5 overs)	R. Premadasa Stadium, Colombo, Sri Lanka	
45	9 March 2025	Canada; 167/8 (39 overs)	Namibia; 174 (39 overs) (Note: The DLS target for Namibia was 175.)	Wanderers Cricket Ground, Windhoek, Namibia	
46	21 May 2025	Oman; 266 (49.4 overs)	United States; 266/9 (50 overs)	Broward County Stadium, Lauderhill, United States	
47	21 October 2025	Bangladesh; 213/7 (50 overs)	West Indies; 213/9 (50 overs)	Sher-e-Bangla National Cricket Stadium, Mirpur, Bangladesh	

== Tiebreakers ==
Until recently, tied One Day Internationals generally have not proceeded to a tiebreaker, unless they are knockout matches in tournaments. As such the use of any tiebreaker is rare.

The 2019 Cricket World Cup Final was the first One Day International to go to a Super Over. The Super Over was also tied, so the match was determined by boundary countback. Because England had scored more boundaries in both the main game and the Super Over, they were declared winners of the match, and therefore the World Cup. (This rule has been changed to allow multiple super overs after this incident.)

The second ODI to be determined with a Super Over was played between Zimbabwe and Pakistan on 2 November 2020. Pakistan could only score 3 runs, which Zimbabwe reached with 3 balls remaining.

The third ODI to be determined with a Super Over was played between West Indies and Netherlands on 26 June 2023. The Netherlands scored 30 runs in one over, In reply West Indies managed to score 8 runs only.

Super Overs in One Day Internationals
No.	Date	Batting first	Batting second	Venue	Result	Ref
1	14 July 2019 †	New Zealand; 241/8 (50 overs)	England; 241 (50 overs)	Lord's, London, England	England won	
2	2 November 2020	Zimbabwe; 278/6 (50 overs)	Pakistan; 278/9 (50 overs)	Rawalpindi Cricket Stadium, Rawalpindi, Pakistan	Zimbabwe won	
3	26 June 2023	West Indies; 374/6 (50 overs)	Netherlands; 374/9 (50 overs)	Takashinga Sports Club, Harare, Zimbabwe	Netherlands won	
4	9 March 2025	Canada; 167/8 (39 overs)	Namibia; 174 (39 overs)	Wanderers Cricket Ground, Windhoek, Namibia	Canada won	
5	21 May 2025	Oman; 266 (49.4 overs)	United States; 266/9 (50 overs)	Broward County Stadium, Lauderhill, United States	United States won	
6	21 October 2025	Bangladesh; 213/7 (50 overs)	West Indies; 213/9 (50 overs)	Sher-e-Bangla National Cricket Stadium, Mirpur, Bangladesh	West Indies won	

=== Wicket count ===
There have been two instances where the team which lost fewer wickets was declared the winner. (Note: Barring two occasions where the team that had lost fewer wickets was declared as the winner.)

Tiebreakers in One Day Internationals
No.	Date	Batting first	Batting second	Venue	Result	Ref
1	20 March 1987	India; 212/6 (44 overs)	Pakistan; 212/7 (44 overs)	Lal Bahadur Shastri Stadium, Hyderabad, India	India won	
2	14 October 1988	Australia; 229/8 (45 overs)	Pakistan; 229/7 (45 overs)	Gaddafi Stadium, Lahore, Pakistan	Pakistan won	

== By teams ==
Teams involved in most number of tied ODI matches
Team	Matches
West Indies	12
India	10
Australia	9
England	9
Pakistan	9
Zimbabwe	8
New Zealand	7
South Africa	6
Sri Lanka	6
Ireland	3
United States	2
Afghanistan	1
Bangladesh	1
Canada	1
Namibia	1
Netherlands	1
Oman	1
Scotland	1
United Arab Emirates	1
Nepal	1
Papua New Guinea	1

== See also ==
- List of tied first-class cricket matches
- Tied Test
- List of tied Twenty20 Internationals
- List of tied Women's One Day Internationals
