= Nicki Turner (cricketer) =

New Zealand cricketer (born 1959)

Personal information
- Full name: Nichola Joan Turner
- Born: 25 December 1959 (age 66); Christchurch, New Zealand
- Batting: Right-handed
- Bowling: Right-arm medium
- Role: Batter

International information
- National side: New Zealand (1982–1991)
- Test debut (cap 81): 6 July 1984 v England
- Last Test: 1 February 1990 v Australia
- ODI debut (cap 30): 10 January 1982 v England
- Last ODI: 20 January 1991 v Australia

Domestic team information
- Years: Team
- 1977/78–1990/91: Canterbury
- 1991/92–1992/93: Auckland

Career statistics
Competition	WTest	WODI	WFC	WLA
Matches	6	28	56	61
Runs scored	208	624	2,328	1,657
Batting average	29.71	26.00	34.23	31.26
100s/50s	0/2	1/2	2/14	1/10
Top score	65*	114	165	114
Balls bowled	–	–	96	–
Wickets	–	–	2	–
Bowling average	–	–	16.00	–
5 wickets in innings	–	–	0	–
10 wickets in match	–	–	0	–
Best bowling	–	–	2/19	–
Catches/stumpings	1/–	5/–	15/–	8/–
- Source: CricketArchive, 6 May 2021

Nichola Joan Turner (born 25 December 1959) is a New Zealand former cricketer who played as a right-handed batter. She appeared in 6 Test matches and 28 One Day Internationals for New Zealand between 1982 and 1991. She played domestic cricket for Canterbury and Auckland.

She coached the New Zealand Under 23 team in an Internal series and in a match against a touring England team in 1992.

Having previously held cricket's highest coaching qualification (MCC), when New Zealand Cricket altered its qualifications to bring in a Tier 3 qualification system, Turner was the first woman to receive the highest qualification and was amongst the first (of men and women) to receive it.

In 1993, she applied for the role of Head Coach of the Auckland Aces (Mens cricket), losing out to John Bracewell despite holding the same level 3 qualification and having more experience as a coach of male cricketers. A controversy erupted, most notably with Gavin Larsen and Adam Parore stating they had concerns about a woman in their changing room and how could a woman, who has never faced the fastest bowler, tell him anything about how to bat.

Turner commentated the Black Caps matches against England (Test series) and ODIs versus Zimbabwe for TVNZ in the 1996/1997 season.

In 1997, Turner joined the Board of Coaching New Zealand and served as its president until it was merged into SPARC.

In 2007, Turner became a board member of SPARC (now SportNZ) serving a three-year term during which, on behalf of SPARC, she launched 'the Active Communities Strategy which aims to encourage people to live healthy lifestyles and increase participation in, and strengthen the delivery of, sport and recreation in Hamilton'.
