= Denise Martin =

Australian cricketer

Personal information
- Full name: Denise Martin
- Born: 4 March 1959 (age 67); Mount Lawley, Perth, Western Australia
- Batting: Left-handed
- Bowling: Left-arm medium
- Role: Bowler

International information
- National side: Australia (1982–1987)
- Test debut (cap 101): 21 January 1984 v India
- Last Test: 25 January 1985 v England
- ODI debut (cap 29): 10 January 1982 v India
- Last ODI: 19 January 1987 v New Zealand

Domestic team information
- Years: Team
- 1980/81–1987/88: Western Australia

Career statistics
Competition	WTest	WODI	WFC	WLA
Matches	7	17	23	38
Runs scored	41	17	280	210
Batting average	10.25	4.25	31.11	12.35
100s/50s	0/0	0/0	0/0	0/1
Top score	17	5*	35*	50
Balls bowled	1,332	1,086	3,312	2,242
Wickets	17	27	45	52
Bowling average	17.94	13.92	14.93	15.42
5 wickets in innings	0	0	1	0
10 wickets in match	0	0	0	0
Best bowling	4/24	3/8	5/39	3/8
Catches/stumpings	5/–	4/–	13/–	8/–
- Source: CricketArchive, 16 January 2023

Denise Martin (married name Plain; born 4 March 1959) is an Australian former cricketer who played as a left-arm medium bowler. She appeared in seven Test matches and 17 One Day Internationals for Australia between 1982 and 1987. She played domestic cricket for Western Australia.

Martin was a member of the Australian team that won the 1982 Women's Cricket World Cup.
