= Jan Southgate =

English cricketer (born 1955)

Personal information
- Full name: Janet Southgate
- Born: 24 September 1955 (age 71); Eastcote, Middlesex, England
- Batting: Right-handed
- Role: Batter

International information
- National side: England (1976–1985)
- Test debut (cap 77): 19 June 1976 v Australia
- Last Test: 25 January 1985 v Australia
- ODI debut (cap 20): 1 August 1976 v Australia
- Last ODI: 3 February 1985 v Australia

Domestic team information
- Years: Team
- 1975–1984: Sussex

Career statistics
| Competition | WTest | WODI | WFC | WLA |
|---|---|---|---|---|
| Matches | 13 | 17 | 22 | 38 |
| Runs scored | 490 | 372 | 1,050 | 1,004 |
| Batting average | 23.33 | 28.61 | 31.81 | 35.85 |
| 100s/50s | 0/3 | 0/3 | 2/3 | 1/6 |
| Top score | 74 | 82 | 201* | 104 |
| Balls bowled | 238 | 138 | 466 | 444 |
| Wickets | 2 | 4 | 6 | 10 |
| Bowling average | 50.50 | 23.00 | 35.33 | 26.00 |
| 5 wickets in innings | 0 | 0 | 0 | 0 |
| 10 wickets in match | 0 | 0 | 0 | 0 |
| Best bowling | 1/13 | 2/28 | 1/6 | 3/36 |
| Catches/stumpings | 9/– | 4/– | 23/– | 15/– |
- Source: CricketArchive, 28 February 2021

Janet Southgate (née Allen; born 24 September 1955) is an English former cricketer who played as a right-handed batter. She appeared in 13 Test matches and 17 One Day Internationals for England between 1976 and 1985. She played domestic cricket for Sussex.
