= Avril Starling =

English cricketer (born 1953)

Personal information
- Full name: Avril Moira Starling
- Born: 19 April 1953 (age 73); Hampstead, Middlesex, England
- Bowling: Right-arm medium
- Role: Bowler

International information
- National side: England (1982–1986)
- Test debut (cap 93): 6 July 1984 v New Zealand
- Last Test: 12 July 1986 v India
- ODI debut (cap 31): 10 January 1982 v New Zealand
- Last ODI: 22 June 1986 v India

Domestic team information
- Years: Team
- 1976–1981: Lancashire and Cheshire
- 1984–1991: Middlesex

Career statistics
Competition	WTest	WODI	WFC	WLA
Matches	11	20	18	47
Runs scored	30	5	84	37
Batting average	6.00	2.50	7.63	3.36
100s/50s	0/0	0/0	0/0	0/0
Top score	9	3*	19*	7
Balls bowled	2,738	1,242	4,172	2,764
Wickets	37	25	56	58
Bowling average	24.64	18.16	23.76	16.63
5 wickets in innings	1	0	1	0
10 wickets in match	0	0	0	0
Best bowling	5/36	3/7	5/36	4/22
Catches/stumpings	4/–	2/–	7/–	8/–
- Source: CricketArchive, 25 February 2021

Avril Moira Starling (born 19 April 1953) is an English former cricketer who played as a medium pace bowler. She appeared in 11 Test matches and 20 One Day Internationals for England between 1982 and 1986. She played domestic cricket for Lancashire and Cheshire and Middlesex.
