= Shantha Rangaswamy =

Indian cricketer

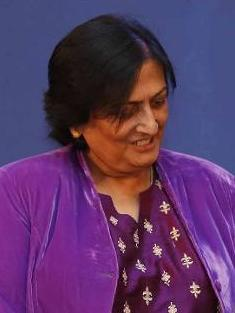

Personal information
- Full name: Shantha Rangaswamy
- Born: 1 January 1954 (age 72); Madras, Madras State, India
- Batting: Right-handed
- Role: All-rounder

International information
- National side: India (1976–1991)
- Test debut (cap 10): 31 October 1976 v West Indies
- Last Test: 26 January 1991 v Australia
- ODI debut (cap 19): 10 January 1982 v Australia
- Last ODI: 27 July 1987 v England

Career statistics
Competition	Test	ODI
Matches	16	19
Runs scored	750	287
Batting average	32.60	15.10
100s/50s	1/6	0/1
Top score	108	50
Balls bowled	1,555	902
Wickets	21	12
Bowling average	31.61	29.41
5 wickets in innings	0	0
10 wickets in match	0	0
Best bowling	4/42	3/25
Catches/stumpings	10/–	6/–
- Source: ESPNcricinfo, 11 January 2013

Shantha Rangaswamy (born 1 January 1954) is an Indian cricketer who played as an allrounder. She played Women's Test cricket for India in 16 matches from 1976 to 1991, captaining the side in 8 matches in 1976-77 and four in 1983–84. India recorded its first-ever Test win in November 1976 against West Indies under Shantha's captaincy at the Moin-ul-Haq Stadium in Patna. She also played in 19 Women's One-day Internationals from 1981–82 to 1986, captaining the side in 16 matches from 1981–82 to 1983–84.

== Career statistics ==
A right-handed batter, she scored 750 runs at a batting average of 32.6 in her 16 Test matches, with one century (108), which was the first century by Indian Women Cricketer against New Zealand on 8 January 1977 at Carisbrook, Dunedin. She also took 21 wickets bowling right arm medium pace at a bowling average of 31.61, including a best analysis of 4–42 against England.

In 19 ODIs, she scored 287 runs at 15.1, and took 12 wickets at 29.41. She recorded her best batting and bowling performances in ODIs at the Women's Cricket World Cup in New Zealand in 1982, scoring her only ODI fifty (out for 50) against New Zealand, and taking 3–25 against an International XI. She is 1st Indian Woman Cricketer who made Century in Test Match (Vs New Zealand at Dunedin ) for India.

In October 2019, she became the first Indian female cricketer to represent the Indian Cricketers' Association and the BCCI Apex Council.

== Personal life ==
Shantha was born to C. V. Rangaswamy and Rajalakshmi. She is the third born child and has six sisters.

Rangaswamy won the Arjuna award in 1976. She is now a cricket writer and was an executive (General Manager) at Canara Bank (Bangalore Region).

She is also the first recipient of the Lifetime Achievement Award for Women from the Board of Control for Cricket in India (BCCI).
