= Gwen Nagel =

New Zealand cricketer and umpire

Gwen Nagel QSO
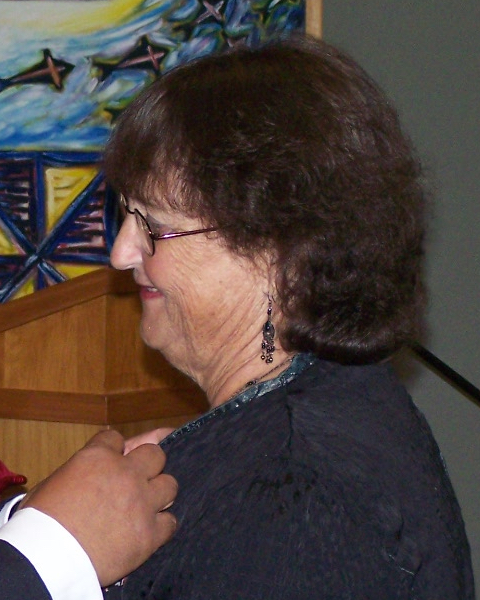
- Nagel in April 2009

Personal information
- Full name: Gwendolyn Anne Nagel
- Born: 20 May 1946; Auckland, New Zealand
- Died: 17 October 2009 (aged 63); Auckland, New Zealand
- Batting: Right-handed
- Bowling: Left-arm medium-fast

Domestic team information
- Years: Team
- 1965/66–1968/69: North Shore Women
- FC debut: 27 December 1965 North Shore Women v Canterbury Women
- Last FC: 30 December 1968 North Shore Women v Wellington Women

Umpiring information
- WTests umpired: 1 (1977)
- WODIs umpired: 3 (1982)
- Source: CricketArchive, 12 January 2017

Gwendolyn Anne Nagel QSO (née Townsend; 20 May 1946 – 17 October 2009) was a New Zealand advocate for people with vision impairment, cricketer and international cricket umpire. She umpired in one Women's Test Match and three Women's One Day Internationals.

== Career ==
Nagel made her first-class debut in December 1965. She played 14 first-class matches for North Shore Women. She was a right-handed batter and bowled left-arm medium fast.

Nagel has a master's of education degree from Massey University. Nagel spent over 25 years advocating and working for improved educational services for blind and vision-impaired children. She was a senior lecturer at the Auckland College of Education, where she was the coordinator of the Postgraduate Diploma in Education of Students with Vision Impairment. She spent many years as a vision research teacher, travelling to schools across the North Island to teach blind students. She also was chief executive of the Vision Education Agency. In the 2009 New Year Honours, Nagel was appointed a Companion of the Queen's Service Order, for services to special education.
