= Jen Jacobs =

Australian cricketer

Personal information
- Full name: Jennifer Mary Jacobs
- Born: 8 March 1956; Adelaide, Australia
- Died: 20 July 2016 (aged 60); Melbourne, Australia
- Batting: Right-handed
- Bowling: Right-arm off break
- Role: All-rounder

International information
- National side: Australia (1979–1984)
- Test debut (cap 94): 19 January 1979 v New Zealand
- Last Test: 21 December 1984 v England
- ODI debut (cap 27): 10 January 1982 v India
- Last ODI: 23 February 1984 v India

Domestic team information
- Years: Team
- 1977/78–1981/82: South Australia
- 1982/83–1984/85: Victoria

Career statistics
Competition	WTest	WODI	WFC	WLA
Matches	7	13	30	26
Runs scored	136	235	480	432
Batting average	13.60	21.36	18.46	18.00
100s/50s	0/0	0/0	0/1	0/1
Top score	48	43	69	51
Balls bowled	838	102	2,208	363
Wickets	8	3	62	6
Bowling average	41.25	26.33	15.72	30.83
5 wickets in innings	0	0	1	0
10 wickets in match	0	0	0	0
Best bowling	4/72	2/35	5/32	2/18
Catches/stumpings	4/–	0/–	11/–	2/–
- Source: CricketArchive, 31 January 2023

Jennifer Mary Jacobs (8 March 1956 – 21 July 2016) was an Australian cricketer who played as a right-arm off break bowler and right-handed batter. She appeared in seven Test matches and 13 One Day Internationals for Australia between 1979 and 1984. She played domestic cricket for South Australia and Victoria.
