= Eileen Badham =

New Zealand cricketer (born 1951)

Personal information
- Full name: Eileen Anne Badham
- Born: 2 November 1951 (age 75); Mangakino, Waikato, New Zealand
- Batting: Right-handed
- Bowling: Left-arm medium
- Role: All-rounder

International information
- National sides: International XI (1973); New Zealand (1976–1982)
- Test debut (cap 70): 12 January 1979; New Zealand v Australia
- Last Test: 26 January 1979; New Zealand v Australia
- ODI debut (cap 1/15): 23 June 1973; International XI v England
- Last ODI: 6 February 1982; New Zealand v Australia

Domestic team information
- Years: Team
- 1969/70–1985/86: North Shore

Career statistics
Competition	WTest	WODI	WFC	WLA
Matches	3	19	56	30
Runs scored	121	172	1,604	300
Batting average	24.20	14.33	34.86	15.78
100s/50s	0/0	0/1	1/8	0/2
Top score	42	51*	103	56
Balls bowled	999	1,164	6,533	1,786
Wickets	10	19	185	35
Bowling average	27.50	22.21	11.27	18.22
5 wickets in innings	0	0	13	0
10 wickets in match	0	0	1	0
Best bowling	4/46	4/19	7/25	4/19
Catches/stumpings	7/–	11/–	38/–	22/–
- Source: CricketArchive, 13 October 2021

Eileen Anne Badham (born 2 November 1951) is a New Zealand former cricketer who played as an all-rounder, batting right-handed and bowling left-arm medium. She appeared in 3 Test matches and 13 One Day Internationals for New Zealand between 1976 and 1982. She also appeared in 6 matches for International XI at the 1973 World Cup. She played domestic cricket for North Shore.
