= Christine White (cricketer) =

Australian cricketer

Personal information
- Full name: Christine Helena White
- Born: 16 November 1952 (age 73); Melbourne, Australia
- Batting: Right-handed
- Bowling: Right-arm medium
- Role: Bowler

International information
- National side: Australia (1977–1982)
- Only Test (cap 88): 15 January 1977 v India
- ODI debut (cap 31): 16 January 1982 v New Zealand
- Last ODI: 4 February 1982 v India

Domestic team information
- Years: Team
- 1975/76–1982/83: Victoria

Career statistics
Competition	WTest	WODI	WFC	WLA
Matches	1	6	16	26
Runs scored	1	24	152	113
Batting average	1.00	24.00	11.69	14.12
100s/50s	0/0	0/0	0/0	0/0
Top score	1	16*	45	30
Balls bowled	40	318	844	1,608
Wickets	0	2	6	24
Bowling average	–	52.00	38.66	21.95
5 wickets in innings	0	0	0	0
10 wickets in match	0	0	0	0
Best bowling	–	2/19	3/22	6/6
Catches/stumpings	0/–	1/–	8/2	2/–
- Source: CricketArchive, 10 November 2023

Christine Helena White (born 16 November 1952) is an Australian former cricketer who played as a right-arm medium bowler. She appeared in one Test match and six One Day Internationals for Australia between 1977 and 1982. She played domestic cricket for Victoria.
