= Maureen Peters (cricketer) =

New Zealand cricketer (born 1943)

Personal information
- Full name: Maureen Helen Peters
- Born: 4 January 1943 (age 83); Lower Hutt, New Zealand
- Batting: Right-handed
- Bowling: Right-arm medium
- Role: Bowler

International information
- National side: New Zealand (1973–1982)
- Test debut (cap 65): 21 March 1975 v Australia
- Last Test: 8 January 1977 v India
- ODI debut (cap 9): 23 June 1973 v Trinidad and Tobago
- Last ODI: 6 February 1982 v Australia

Domestic team information
- Years: Team
- 1960/61–1983/84: Wellington

Career statistics
Competition	WTest	WODI	WFC	WLA
Matches	2	16	79	29
Runs scored	5	79	1,560	199
Batting average	2.50	11.28	19.50	19.90
100s/50s	0/0	0/0	2/2	0/0
Top score	5	24	108	45*
Balls bowled	456	935	14,912	1,643
Wickets	3	19	245	34
Bowling average	41.00	15.31	14.20	14.47
5 wickets in innings	0	0	12	0
10 wickets in match	0	0	2	0
Best bowling	1/5	2/3	8/25	4/8
Catches/stumpings	0/–	3/–	25/–	4/–
- Source: CricketArchive, 14 November 2021

Maureen Helen Peters (born 4 January 1943) is a New Zealand former cricketer who played primarily as a right-arm medium bowler. She appeared in two Test matches and 16 One Day Internationals for New Zealand between 1973 and 1982. She played domestic cricket for the Wellington Blaze.

Peters later served as a national selector.
