= International XI women's cricket team =

International XI
International Cricket Council
- ICC region: International

One Day Internationals
- First ODI: v England at the County Cricket Ground, Hove; 23 June 1973
- Last ODI: v India at the University of Canterbury, Christchurch; 6 February 1982
ODIs	Played	Won/Lost
Total	18	3/14 (0 ties, 1 no result)
- World Cup appearances: 2 (first in 1973)
- Best result: 4th (1973)
- As of 3 January 2019

The International XI women's cricket team was a team that took part in two Women's Cricket World Cups. They were essentially a "best of the rest" team, including players not selected by their own countries. They took part in the 1973 Women's Cricket World Cup, finishing in fourth place, and returned for the 1982 tournament, finishing in last place. Their overall record in ODIs was played 18, won 3, lost 14, with one no result.

== History ==
International XI were formed to compete in the 1973 Women's Cricket World Cup, "making up the numbers" along with Young England after South Africa was not invited due to apartheid. The side was made up of players not selected for the other teams competing in the tournament. Five South African players were originally selected for the side, but withdrew after Jamaica and Trinidad and Tobago threatened to boycott the tournament. The team was therefore made up of players from Australia, England, New Zealand and the West Indies, and was captained by Audrey Disbury.

International XI played in what was effectively one of the first three World Cup matches, after the match between Jamaica and New Zealand scheduled for three days earlier was rained off. They played against England, losing the match by 135 runs after Enid Bakewell and Lynne Thomas hit centuries for the opposition. In their second match, they recorded their first win, chasing down New Zealand's first innings score of 136 by 2 wickets with just one ball remaining. They then lost to Young England before beating both Jamaica and Trinidad and Tobago, by 5 wickets and 7 wickets, respectively. In their final match against Australia, the match was ended after just 4.4 overs due to rain. With 3 wins from their 6 matches, International XI finished fourth in the group of 7, just behind New Zealand on Run Rate.

The side returned for the 1982 Women's Cricket World Cup, replacing the West Indies and the Netherlands, who withdrew for political and financial reasons, respectively. They competed in a five-team group alongside Australia, England, New Zealand and India, playing each team three times. The side was made up of players from the four other sides in the tournament, plus two players from the Netherlands. Sue Rattray of New Zealand was the only player to appear for the side at both World Cups, whilst in this edition of the tournament they were captained by Lynne Thomas. The side lost all 12 of their matches in the tournament, although Thomas was the second-highest run-scorer in the tournament, with 383 runs including two half-centuries.

== Tournament history ==
=== Women's Cricket World Cup ===
- 1973: 4th
- 1982: 5th

== Records ==
=== One-Day Internationals ===
- Highest team total: 163/5 vs Jamaica, 14 July 1973.
- Highest individual score: 70*, Lynne Thomas vs India, 17 January 1982.
- Best innings bowling: 4/13, Jenny Owens vs India, 6 February 1982.

Most ODI runs for International XI Women
Player	Runs	Average	Career span
Lynne Thomas	383	38.30	1982
Sue Rattray	271	20.84	1973–1982
Rhonda Kendall	149	12.41	1982
Trish McKelvey	106	21.20	1973
Audrey Disbury	100	20.00	1973

Most ODI wickets for International XI Women
Player	Wickets	Average	Career span
Sandra Braganza	15	20.26	1982
Sue Rattray	15	23.66	1973–1982
Jenny Owens	12	28.58	1982
Eileen Badham	7	18.85	1973
Gloria Farrell	6	20.33	1973
Wendy Williams	6	26.66	1973

ODI record versus other nations
Opponent	M	W	L	T	NR	First	Last
Australia	4	0	3	0	1	1973	1982
England	4	0	4	0	0	1973	1982
India	3	0	3	0	0	1982	1982
Jamaica	1	1	0	0	0	1973	1973
New Zealand	4	1	3	0	0	1973	1982
Trinidad and Tobago	1	1	0	0	0	1973	1973
Young England	1	0	1	0	0	1973	1973
Total	18	3	14	0	1	1973	1982

== See also ==
- List of International XI women ODI cricketers
