= New Zealand women's cricket team in India in 1984–85 =

	India	New Zealand
- Dates: 17 February – 24 March 1985
Captains	Diana Edulji	Debbie Hockley

Test series
- Result: 3-match series drawn 0–0
Most runs	Sandhya Agarwal (232)	Ingrid Jagersma (214)
Most wickets	Diana Edulji (11)	Sue Rattray (14)

One Day International series
- Results: 6-match series drawn 3–3
Most runs	Sudha Shah (167)	Debbie Hockley (199)
Most wickets	Shubhangi Kulkarni (11)	Karen Gunn (11)

The New Zealand women's national cricket team toured India in February and March 1985. They played against India in three Test matches and six One Day Internationals, with the Test series ending as a 0–0 draw and the ODI series ending as a 3–3 draw.

== Squads ==
India	New Zealand
Diana Edulji (c); Sandhya Agarwal; Gargi Banerjee; Runa Basu; Lopamudra Bhattacharji; Sreerupa Bose; Sandra Braganza; Rita Dey (wk); Arunadhati Ghosh; Rekha Godbole (wk); Shashi Gupta; Nilima Jogalekar (wk); Neeta Kadam; Shubhangi Kulkarni; Mithu Mukherjee; Rita Patel; Anjali Pendharker; Sudha Shah; Manimala Singhal (wk); Rajani Venugopal	Debbie Hockley (c); Jackie Clark; Delwyn Costello; Jeanette Dunning; Linda Fraser; Shona Gilchrist; Karen Gunn (wk); Ingrid Jagersma (wk); Ann McKenna; Katrina Molloy; Sue Rattray; Liz Signal; Rose Signal; Lois Simpson; Nancy Williams

== Tour Matches ==
=== 2-day match: East Zone v New Zealand ===
2 – 3 March 1985
Scorecard

New Zealand	v	East Zone
187 (72.3 overs); Nancy Williams 72 (102); R Jana 3/27 (12 overs)		165 (89.5 overs); Lopamudra Bhattacharji 68 (–); Shona Gilchrist 3/7 (19.5 overs)
123/3 (48 overs); Lois Simpson 56 (161); Seema Desai 1/4 (2 overs)

Match drawn
Nehru Stadium, Durgapur
Umpires: LP Ramani (Ind) and SP Verma (Ind)

- New Zealand Women won the toss and elected to bat.

=== 40-over match: Women's Cricket Association of India President's XI v New Zealand ===
5 March 1985
Scorecard

Women's Cricket Association of India President's XI; 128/5 (40 overs)	v	New Zealand; 130/4 (36.4 overs)
Gargi Banerjee 56 (–); Katrina Molloy 2/31 (8 overs)		Debbie Hockley 81* (113); Pratima Chakraborti 1/17 (5 overs)

New Zealand Women won by 6 wickets
Eden Gardens, Calcutta
Umpires: Bhairab Ganguli (Ind) and Ratin Mitra (Ind)

- New Zealand Women won the toss and elected to field.

== WODI Series ==
=== 1st ODI ===
17 February 1985
Scorecard

India; 165/6 (50 overs)	v	New Zealand; 166/4 (49 overs)
Sudha Shah 43 (–); Karen Gunn 2/26 (10 overs)		Debbie Hockley 65* (–); Diana Edulji 2/18 (8 overs)

New Zealand Women won by 6 wickets
Sawai Mansingh Stadium, Jaipur

- India Women won the toss and elected to bat.
- Sreerupa Bose (Ind) made her WODI debut.

=== 2nd ODI ===
19 February 1985
Scorecard

New Zealand; 174/7 (50 overs)	v	India; 172/9 (50 overs)
Sue Rattray 49* (–); Gargi Banerjee 2/23 (6 overs)		Gargi Banerjee 49 (–); Nancy Williams 1/25 (6 overs)

New Zealand Women won by 2 runs
Feroz Shah Kotla Stadium, Delhi

- India Women won the toss and elected to field.
- Manimala Singhal (Ind) made her WODI debut.

=== 3rd ODI ===
21 February 1985
Scorecard

India; 129 (43 overs)	v	New Zealand; 73 (33.5 overs)
Shubhangi Kulkarni 35 (–); Shona Gilchrist 3/20 (9 overs)		Liz Signal 28* (–); Sandra Braganza 3/13 (9 overs)

India Women won by 56 runs
Nehru Stadium, Indore

- New Zealand Women won the toss and elected to field.
- Rita Patel (Ind) made her WODI debut.

=== 4th ODI ===
13 March 1985
Scorecard

New Zealand; 202/7 (49 overs)	v	India; 154/9 (49 overs)
Jeanette Dunning 89 (–); Shubhangi Kulkarni 4/27 (6 overs)		Shashi Gupta 50* (–); Karen Gunn 3/25 (10 overs)

New Zealand Women won by 48 runs
Keenan Stadium, Jamshedpur

- New Zealand Women won the toss and elected to bat.
- Neeta Kadam (Ind) made her WODI debut.

=== 5th ODI ===
15 March 1985
Scorecard

New Zealand; 187/6 (49 overs)	v	India; 189/7 (47.1 overs)
Debbie Hockley 69 (–); Diana Edulji 3/31 (10 overs)		Sudha Shah 48 (–); Karen Gunn 2/39 (9 overs)

India Women won by 3 wickets
Moin-ul-Haq Stadium, Patna

- New Zealand Women won the toss and elected to bat.
- Match reduced to 49 overs per side due to rain.
- Rajani Venugopal (Ind) made her WODI debut.

=== 6th ODI ===
24 March 1985
Scorecard

New Zealand; 148/7 (48 overs)	v	India; 149/6 (43.4 overs)
Debbie Hockley 35 (–); Shubhangi Kulkarni 4/34 (10 overs)		Sudha Shah 30 (–); Katrina Molloy 2/16 (10 overs)

India Women won by 4 wickets
Maulana Azad Stadium, Jammu

- New Zealand Women won the toss and elected to bat.
- Match reduced to 48 overs per side due to rain.

== WTest Series ==
=== 1st Test ===
23 – 26 February 1985
Scorecard

India	v	New Zealand
327/9d (131 overs); Shubhangi Kulkarni 79 (–); Karen Gunn 3/40 (30 overs)		214 (78 overs); Jackie Clark 54 (–); Shubhangi Kulkarni 6/99 (29 overs)
164 (66 overs); Gargi Banerjee 55 (–); Sue Rattray 3/25 (13 overs)		196/7 (108 overs); Debbie Hockley 55 (–); Shashi Gupta 2/18 (12 overs)

Match drawn
Sardar Vallabhbhai Patel Stadium, Ahmedabad
Player of the match: Shubhangi Kulkarni (Ind)

- India Women won the toss and elected to bat.
- Delwyn Costello, Karen Gunn, Lois Simpson (NZ), Sandra Braganza and Mithu Mukherjee (Ind) all made their WTest debuts.

=== 2nd Test ===
7 – 11 March 1985
Scorecard

New Zealand	v	India
184 (88.4 overs); Ingrid Jagersma 49 (–); Gargi Banerjee 6/9 (9.4 overs)		303 (139.2 overs); Sandhya Agarwal 106 (–); Sue Rattray 5/76 (34.2 overs)
256/4 (154 overs); Ann McKenna 97* (–); Diana Edulji 2/47 (46 overs)

Match drawn
Barabati Stadium, Cuttack

- New Zealand Women won the toss and elected to bat.
- Katrina Molloy, Nancy Williams (NZ), Lopamudra Bhattacharji, Rekha Godbole and Rajani Venugopal (Ind) all made their WTest debuts.

=== 3rd Test ===
17 – 20 March 1985
Scorecard

India	v	New Zealand
213 (101.4 overs); Anjali Pendharker 81 (–); Shona Gilchrist 3/63 (26 overs)		236/9d (106.1 overs); Jeanette Dunning 67 (–); Diana Edulji 3/41 (31.1 overs)
268/8d (129.2 overs); Sandhya Agarwal 98 (–); Ingrid Jagersma 4/38 (9 overs)		122/3 (32.2 overs); Debbie Hockley 33 (–); Shubhangi Kulkarni 2/24 (7 overs)

Match drawn
K. D. Singh Babu Stadium, Lucknow

- India Women won the toss and elected to bat.
- Neeta Kadam (Ind) made her WTest debut.
