= West Indies women's cricket team in India in 1976–77 =

	India	West Indies
- Dates: 24 October – 27 November 1976
Captains	Shantha Rangaswamy	Louise Browne

Test series
- Result: 6-match series drawn 1–1
Most runs	Shantha Rangaswamy (381)	Patricia Whittaker (201)
Most wickets	Shubhangi Kulkarni (23)	Patricia Whittaker (14)

The West Indies women's cricket team toured India in October and November 1976. They played India in a six Test match series, which ended as a 1–1 draw. The matches were the first ever played by the India women's team.

India won the fourth Test by 5 wickets in Patna on 19 November, recording its first ever Test match victory. In the sixth Test, the West Indies handed India a massive defeat, beating them by an innings and 24 runs on November 29 to draw the series.

== Squads ==
India	West Indies
Shantha Rangaswamy (c); Runa Basu; Sharmila Chakraborty; Uthpala Chakraborty; Rajeshwari Dholakia; Behroze Edulji; Diana Edulji; Susan Itticheria; Fowzieh Khalili (wk); Shubhangi Kulkarni; Sandhya Mazumdar; Ujwala Nikam; Shobha Pandit; Jyotsna Patel; Sudha Shah	Louise Browne (c); Joan Alexander-Serrano; Sheryl Bayley; Beverly Browne; Peggy Fairweather; Yolande Geddes-Hall (wk); Gloria Gill; Dorothy Hobson; Vivalyn Latty-Scott; Jasmine Sammy; Nora St. Rose; Menota Tekah; Patricia Whittaker; Grace Williams

== Test Series ==
=== 1st Test ===
31 October – 2 November 1976
Scorecard

West Indies	v	India
274 (78.4 overs); Gloria Gill 53 (–); Shubhangi Kulkarni 5/48 (11.4 overs)		269/6d (99 overs); Shantha Rangaswamy 74 (–); Vivalyn Latty-Scott 3/51 (24 overs)
175/7d (64.5 overs); Grace Williams 56 (–); Shubhangi Kulkarni 2/28 (9 overs)		30/1 (17 overs); Fowzieh Khalili 13* (–); Peggy Fairweather 1/15 (6 overs)

Match drawn
M. Chinnaswamy Stadium, Bangalore

- Toss unknown.
- Sharmila Chakraborty, Behroze Edulji, Diana Edulji, Susan Itticheria, Fowzieh Khalili, Shubhangi Kulkarni, Sandhya Mazumdar, Ujwala Nikam, Shantha Rangaswamy, Shobha Pandit and Sudha Shah (Ind) all made their WTest debuts.

=== 2nd Test ===
7 – 9 November 1976
Scorecard

India	v	West Indies
218/9d (107.5 overs); Diana Edulji 57* (–); Dorothy Hobson 2/22 (16 overs)		41/4 (29 overs); Louise Browne 14* (–); Shantha Rangaswamy 2/8 (10 overs)

Match drawn
M. A. Chidambaram Stadium, Madras
Umpires: Komandur Ramaswami (Ind) and NS Rishi (Ind)

- Toss unknown.
- Runa Basu, Jyotsna Patel (Ind) and Dorothy Hobson (WI) all made their WTest debuts.

=== 3rd Test ===
12 – 14 November 1976
Scorecard

West Indies	v	India
174 (75 overs); Beverly Browne 63 (–); Diana Edulji 4/47 (24 overs)		142 (79.4 overs); Shantha Rangaswamy 78 (–); Patricia Whittaker 4/22 (10.4 overs)
147 (55.3 overs); Patricia Whittaker 50 (–); Sharmila Chakraborty 5/25 (15 overs)		150/6 (64 overs); Fowzieh Khalili 50 (–); Nora St. Rose 3/45 (21 overs)

Match drawn
Feroz Shah Kotla Ground, New Delhi

- Toss unknown.

=== 4th Test ===
17 – 19 November 1976
Scorecard

West Indies	v	India
127 (60.2 overs); Yolande Geddes-Hall 32* (–); Diana Edulji 3/24 (12 overs)		161/9d (100.5 overs); Fowzieh Khalili 58 (–); Vivalyn Latty-Scott 3/65 (35.5 overs)
88 (76.3 overs); Gloria Gill 34 (–); Shubhangi Kulkarni 4/14 (23 overs)		55/5 (26 overs); Diana Edulji 20* (–); Nora St. Rose 3/21 (13 overs)

India Women won by 5 wickets
Moin-ul-Haq Stadium, Patna

- West Indies Women won the toss and elected to bat.

=== 5th Test ===
21 – 23 November 1976
Scorecard

India	v	West Indies
215/9d (127 overs); Fowzieh Khalili 84 (–); Vivalyn Latty-Scott 4/69 (44 overs)		249 (113.5 overs); Grace Williams 63 (–); Shubhangi Kulkarni 5/68 (28 overs)
97/2 (54 overs); Fowzieh Khalili 41* (–); Dorothy Hobson 2/29 (16 overs)

Match drawn
K. D. Singh Babu Stadium, Lucknow

- Toss unknown.
- Rajeshwari Dholakia (Ind) and Joan Alexander-Serrano (WI) both made their WTest debuts.

=== 6th Test ===
27 – 29 November 1976
Scorecard

India	v	West Indies
121 (87.3 overs); Shantha Rangaswamy 63* (–); Peggy Fairweather 4/10 (8.3 overs)		210/8d (– overs); Vivalyn Latty-Scott 51* (–); Shubhangi Kulkarni 4/48 (– overs)
65 (46 overs); Shobha Pandit 16 (–); Grace Williams 4/30 (15 overs)

West Indies Women won by an innings and 24 runs
Maulana Azad Stadium, Jammu

- Toss unknown.
- Uthpala Chakraborty (Ind) made her WTest debut.
