= 1978 Women's Cricket World Cup =

- Dates: 1 – 13 January 1978
- Administrator: International Women's Cricket Council
- Cricket format: Women's One Day International (50-over)
- Tournament format: Round-robin
- Host: India
- Champions: Australia (1st title)
- Runners-up: England
- Participants: 4
- Matches: 6
- Most runs: (Australia) Margaret Jennings (127)
- Most wickets: (Australia) Sharyn Hill (7)

The 1978 Women's Cricket World Cup was an international cricket tournament played in India from 1 to 13 January 1978. Hosted by India for the first time, it was the second edition of the Women's Cricket World Cup, after the inaugural 1973 World Cup in England.

The World Cup was the first international cricket tournament hosted by India. Only four teams participated, the lowest number in the tournament's history – Australia, England, India and New Zealand. The teams played a round-robin tournament of three matches each, with Australia going undefeated to claim its first title. Australia's captain, Margaret Jennings, led the tournament in runs, while her teammate, Sharyn Hill, led the tournament in wickets. Three of the five highest scorers as well as three of the five leading wicket-takers in the tournament were from Australia. Sharon Tredrea featured in both lists, being the second-highest wicket-taker and fourth-highest scorer of the tournament.

== Background ==
It was originally proposed that South Africa host the World Cup, but this was abandoned to conform with the Apartheid-era sporting boycott of the country. The Women's Cricket Association of India (WCAI) then made a successful bid, and served as the primary organiser, with the International Women's Cricket Council (IWCC) providing only limited oversight.

== Participating teams ==
Along with India, which was making its debut, five other teams were originally invited – Australia, England, the Netherlands, New Zealand, and the West Indies. The Netherlands and the West Indies, which had both not previously participated, were forced to withdraw due to financial issues.

=== Squads ===
Information is only available for players who played at least one match at the tournament.

Australia	England	India	New Zealand
Margaret Jennings (c); Elaine Bray; Marie Cornish; Valerie Farrell; Lorraine Hill; Sharyn Hill; Wendy Hills; Jan Lumsden; Julie Stockton; Raelee Thompson; Janette Tredrea; Sharon Tredrea; Peta Verco	Mary Pilling (c); Jacqueline Court; Heather Dewdney; Rosalind Heggs; Shirley Hodges; Glynis Hullah; Megan Lear; Catherine Mowat; Lynne Thomas; Chris Watmough; Margaret Wilks	Diana Edulji (c); Gargi Banerji; Runa Basu; Lopamudra Bhattacharji; Sharmila Chakraborty; Rajeshwari Dholakia; Susan Itticheria; Nilima Jogalekar; Fowzieh Khalili; Shubhangi Kulkarni; Sandhya Mazumdar; Ujwala Nikam; Shobha Pandit; Kalpan Paropkari; Sudha Shah; Anjali Sharma	Trish McKelvey (c); Liz Allan; Eileen Badham; Barbara Bevege; Vicki Burtt; Pat Carrick; Sheree Harris; Cheryl Henshilwood; Linda Lindsay; Karen Marsh; Sue Rattray; Edna Ryan; Viv Sexton

== Venues ==
Four venues hosted matches at the 1978 Women's World Cup:
- Eden Gardens, Calcutta – one match
- Keenan Stadium, Jamshedpur – one match
- Lal Bahadur Shastri Stadium, Hyderabad – two matches
- Moin-ul-Haq Stadium, Patna – two matches

== Warm-up matches ==
At least five warm-up matches were played against various local Indian teams, all but one of which came before the tournament.

Warm-up matches

28 December 1977

England	v	(India) East Zone

Result unknown
Eden Gardens, Calcutta, West Bengal

28 December 1977

New Zealand	v	(India) West Bengal WCA President's XI

Result unknown
Calcutta Cricket and Football Club, Calcutta, West Bengal

28 December 1977

Australia	v	(India) Indian Universities Women's Team

Result unknown
Pune, Maharashtra (exact venue unknown)

30 December 1977

England	v	(India) West Bengal WCA President's XI

Result unknown
Calcutta Cricket and Football Club, Calcutta, West Bengal

2 January 1978

England	v	(India) East Zone

Result unknown
Eden Gardens, Calcutta, West Bengal

== Group stage ==
=== Points table ===
Pos	Team	Pld	W	L	T	NR	Pts	RR
1	Australia	3	3	0	0	0	6	3.264
2	England	3	2	1	0	0	4	2.657
3	New Zealand	3	1	2	0	0	2	2.777
4	India	3	0	3	0	0	0	1.988

Source: ESPNcricinfoCricketArchive
- Note: run rate was to be used as a tiebreaker in the case of teams finishing on an equal number of points, rather than net run rate (as is now common).

== Matches ==
=== New Zealand vs Australia ===
1 January
Scorecard

Australia; 177 (49.2 overs)	v	New Zealand; 111/8 (50 overs)
Wendy Hills 64; Barb Bevege 3/17 (9.2 overs)		Trish McKelvey 37; Sharyn Hill 3/16 (10 overs)

Australia won by 66 runs
Keenan Stadium, Jamshedpur, Bihar (now Jharkhand)
Umpires: KVK Rao (IND) and Sukha Bose (IND)

- Australia won the toss and elected to bat.
- Peta Verco, Sharyn Hill (Aus), Cheryl Henshilwood, Edna Ryan, Pat Carrick, Sheree Harris, Vicki Burtt and Viv Sexton (NZ) all made their WODI debuts.

=== India vs England ===
1 January
Scorecard

India; 63 (39.3 overs)	v	England; 65/1 (30.2 overs)
Diana Edulji 18; Margaret Wilks 2/6 (6 overs)		Lynne Thomas 43*; Diana Edulji 1/18 (10 overs)

England won by 9 wickets
Eden Gardens, Calcutta, West Bengal
Umpires: Bhairab Ganguly (IND) and Sunit Ghosh (IND)

- England won the toss and elected to bowl.
- Anjali Sharma, Diana Edulji, Fowzieh Khalili, Gargi Banerjee, Kalpan Paropkari, Lopamudra Bhattacharji, Nilima Jogalekar, Runa Basu, Sandhya Mazumdar, Sharmila Chakraborty, Shobha Pandit (Ind) and Catherine Mowat (Eng) all made their WODI debuts.

=== New Zealand vs India ===
5 January
Scorecard

India; 130/9 (50 overs)	v	New Zealand; 131/1 (44 overs)
Ujwala Nikam 31*; Linda Lindsay 2/26 (10 overs); Pat Carrick 2/26 (9 overs)		Barb Bevege 67*; Anjali Sharma 1/32 (10 overs)

New Zealand won by 9 wickets
Moin-ul-Haq Stadium, Patna, Bihar

- India won the toss and elected to bat.
- Shubhangi Kulkarni, Sudha Shah, Susan Itticheria, Ujwala Nikam (Ind) and Linda Lindsay (NZ) all made their WODI debuts.

=== India vs Australia ===
8 January
Scorecard

Australia; 150/8 (50 overs)	v	India; 79 (47.2 overs)
Sharon Tredrea 56; Lopamudra Bhattacharji 2/23 (10 overs)		Shobha Pandit 17; Peta Verco 3/9 (9 overs)

Australia won by 71 runs
Moin-ul-Haq Stadium, Patna, Bihar
Umpires: KVK Rao (IND) and Sukha Bose (IND)

- India won the toss and elected to bowl.
- Rajeshwari Dholakia (Ind) made her WODI debut.

=== New Zealand vs England ===
8 January
Scorecard

New Zealand; 157 (49.4 overs)	v	England; 160/3 (40.3 overs)
Barb Bevege 57; Jacqueline Court 4/29 (10 overs)		Lynne Thomas 47; Sue Rattray 2/33 (6 overs)

England won by 7 wickets
Lal Bahadur Shastri Stadium, Hyderabad, Andhra Pradesh (now Telangana)

- England won the toss and elected to bowl.
- Karen Hadlee (NZ) made her WODI debut.

=== England vs Australia ===
Both Australia and England went into the last match of the tournament undefeated, which meant it functioned as a de facto final, akin to the Uruguay v Brazil match at the 1950 Football World Cup.

13 January
Scorecard

England; 96/8 (50 overs)	v	Australia; 100/2 (31.3 overs)
Shirley Hodges 26; Sharon Tredrea 4/25 (10 overs)		Margaret Jennings 57*; Glynis Hullah 2/9 (6 overs)

Australia won by 8 wickets
Lal Bahadur Shastri Stadium, Hyderabad, Andhra Pradesh (now Telangana)
Umpires: SA Swaminathan (IND) and V. K. Ramaswamy (IND)

- Australia won the toss and elected to bowl.

== Notable aspects ==
The World Cup was reportedly poorly organised, with the conflicts between the WCAI, Indian state governments and the national governments. The visiting international teams were advised that the tournament would be held from 29 December 1977 to 23 January 1978 and were requested to arrive in mid-December for warm-up matches. They arrived to find that no matches had been organised; the WCAI issued an itinerary after the first match, but only around half of the anticipated matches were completed.

The tournament nonetheless attracted large crowds. England's Megan Lear later recounted that the "most memorable part of [the] tournament was playing in front of crowds of 40,000 plus".

The Indians were the first women's team to play in trousers; at the previous World Cup all teams had played in skirts.

== Statistics ==
=== Most runs ===
The top five runscorers are included in this table, ranked by runs scored and then by batting average.

Player	Team	Runs	Inns	Avg	Highest	100s	50s
Margaret Jennings	Australia	127	3	63.50	57*	0	1
Barbara Bevege	New Zealand	126	3	63.00	67*	0	2
Lynne Thomas	England	109	3	54.50	47	0	0
Sharon Tredrea	Australia	87	2	43.50	56	0	1
Wendy Hills	Australia	66	3	22.00	64	0	1

Source: ESPNcricinfo CricketArchive

=== Most wickets ===
The top five wicket takers are listed in this table, ranked by wickets taken and then by bowling average.

Player	Team	Overs	Wkts	Ave	SR	Econ	BBI
Sharyn Hill	Australia	30.0	7	7.57	25.71	1.76	3/16
Sharon Tredrea	Australia	25.0	6	7.00	25.00	1.68	4/25
Pat Carrick	New Zealand	29.0	6	17.66	29.00	3.65	3/43
Glynis Hullah	England	21.1	5	6.80	25.40	1.60	2/2
Peta Verco	Australia	23.0	5	7.40	27.60	1.60	3/9

Source: ESPNcricinfo
