= India women's cricket team in Australia in 1990–91 =

Indian women's cricket team in Australia in 1990–91
	Australia	India
- Dates: 26 January – 12 February 1991
Captains	Lyn Larsen	Shubhangi Kulkarni

Test series
- Result: Australia won the 3-match series 2–0
Most runs	Belinda Haggett (339)	Rajani Venugopal (175)
Most wickets	Debbie Wilson (15)	Diana Edulji (5)

The India women's cricket team toured Australia between January and February 1991 to play a series of three Women's Test matches. Australia won the series 2–0.

== Women's Test Series ==
=== 1st WTest ===
26–29 January 1991
Scorecard

Australia	v	India
301/4d (109 overs); Belinda Clark 104; Shubhangi Kulkarni 2/74 (21 overs)		217 (150.2 overs); Rajani Venugopal 53; Sally Moffat 4/43 (33.2 overs)
111/6d (62 overs); Joanne Broadbent 31; Sudha Shah 3/28 (15 overs)		83/6 (55 overs); Shubhangi Kulkarni 26; Joanne Broadbent 2/3 (5 overs)

Match drawn
North Sydney Oval, Sydney
Umpires: Graham Reed (Aus) and Stevenie Harman (Aus)

- India Women won the toss and elected to field.
- Belinda Clark and Tunde Juhasz (both Aus), and Pramila Bhatt (Ind) made their debut in WTests.

=== 2nd WTest ===
2–5 February 1991
Scorecard

India	v	Australia
141 (124.3 overs); Shashi Gupta 25; Sally Moffat 3/21 (23.3 overs)		237/3d (79 overs); Belinda Haggett 71; Shubhangi Kulkarni 1/49 (11 overs)
162 (136.3 overs); Sandhya Agarwal 33; Debbie Wilson 3/51 (32.3 overs)		67/0 (23.4 overs); Belinda Clark 38*

Australia Women won by 10 wickets
St Peter's College, Adelaide
Umpires: Keith Butler (Aus) and J. C. Noval (Aus)

- India Women won the toss and elected to bat.
- Cathryn Fitzpatrick (Aus) and Seema Desai (Ind) made their debut in WTests.

=== 3rd WTest ===
9–12 February 1991
Scorecard

India	v	Australia
92 (64.5 overs); Rajani Venugopal 23; Debbie Wilson 5/27 (21 overs)		307/3d (123 overs); Belinda Haggett 144; Sandra Braganza 1/44 (14 overs)
267 (157.1 overs); Rajani Venugopal 58; Zoe Goss 2/34 (29.1 overs)		53/1 (22.1 overs); Belinda Clark 35*; Diana Edulji 1/11 (7.1 overs)

Australia Women won by 9 wickets
Richmond Cricket Ground, Melbourne
Umpires: Robin Bailhache and Darrell Holt (Aus)

- Australia Women won the toss and elected to field.
