= Australia women's cricket team in India in 2004–05 =

Australian women's cricket team in India in 2004–05
	India	Australia
- Dates: 11 – 28 December 2004
Captains	Mamatha Maben	Belinda Clark

One Day International series
- Results: Australia won the 7-match series 4–3
Most runs	Mithali Raj (289)	Karen Rolton (288)
Most wickets	Neetu David (12)	Cathryn Fitzpatrick (9)
- Player of the series: Lisa Keightley (Aus)

The Australia women's national cricket team toured India in December 2004. They played against India in seven One Day Internationals, winning the series 4–3.

== Squads ==
India	Australia
Mamatha Maben (c); Nooshin Al Khadeer; Anjum Chopra; Neetu David; Jhulan Goswami; Anju Jain (wk); Hemlata Kala; Arundhati Kirkire; Deepa Marathe; Varsha Raffel; Mithali Raj; Amita Sharma; Jaya Sharma; Monica Sumra	Belinda Clark (c); Alex Blackwell; Kate Blackwell; Leonie Coleman (wk); Cathryn Fitzpatrick; Julie Hayes; Mel Jones; Lisa Keightley (wk); Shelley Nitschke; Karen Rolton; Clea Smith; Lisa Sthalekar; Emma Twining

== WODI Series ==
=== 1st ODI ===
11 December 2004
Scorecard

Australia; 195/6 (50 overs)	v	India; 181/9 (50 overs)
Karen Rolton 82 (111); Amita Sharma 3/37 (10 overs)		Mithali Raj 60* (75); Lisa Sthalekar 2/31 (10 overs)

Australia Women won by 14 runs
Infosys Ground, Mysore
Umpires: N Muralidaran (Ind) and V Mouli (Ind)

- India Women won the toss and elected to field.
- Shelley Nitschke (Aus) made her WODI debut.

=== 2nd ODI ===
13 December 2004
Scorecard

India; 171/7 (50 overs)	v	Australia; 172/7 (49.2 overs)
Anju Jain 51 (92); Lisa Sthalekar 2/36 (10 overs)		Karen Rolton 62* (93); Neetu David 2/39 (10 overs)

Australia Women won by 3 wickets
Infosys Ground, Mysore
Umpires: M Srinivasamurthy (Ind) and V Mouli (Ind)

- Australia Women won the toss and elected to field.
- Kate Blackwell (Aus) and Varsha Raffel (Ind) both made their WODI debuts.

=== 3rd ODI ===
16 December 2004
Scorecard

Australia; 147 (47.1 overs)	v	India; 151/4 (44.1 overs)
Lisa Keightley 56 (113); Neetu David 3/27 (10 overs)		Mithali Raj 62* (71); Lisa Keightley 1/13 (4 overs)

India Women won by 6 wickets
Gymkhana Ground, Mumbai
Umpires: Ajit Datar (Ind) and Marcus Couto (Ind)
Player of the match: Mithali Raj (Ind)

- India Women won the toss and elected to field.

=== 4th ODI ===
19 December 2004
Scorecard

India; 170/7 (50 overs)	v	Australia; 173/2 (44.5 overs)
Jaya Sharma 43 (84); Lisa Keightley 3/17 (10 overs)		Lisa Keightley 80 (122); Jhulan Goswami 1/32 (9 overs)

Australia Women won by 8 wickets
Bilakhiya Stadium, Vapi
Player of the match: Lisa Keightley (Aus)

- Australia Women won the toss and elected to field.

=== 5th ODI ===
22 December 2004
Scorecard

Australia; 160/9 (50 overs)	v	India; 128 (47.1 overs)
Karen Rolton 32 (47); Jhulan Goswami 2/25 (10 overs)		Mithali Raj 36 (54); Lisa Keightley 4/19 (6 overs)

Australia Women won by 32 runs
Pithwala Stadium, Surat
Umpires: Darabshah Doodhwala (Ind) and Ravi Deshmukh (Ind)
Player of the match: Lisa Keightley (Aus)

- Australia Women won the toss and elected to bat.

=== 6th ODI ===
24 December 2004
Scorecard

Australia; 184/7 (50 overs)	v	India; 185/5 (47.1 overs)
Lisa Sthalekar 43 (63); Jhulan Goswami 2/29 (10 overs)		Mithali Raj 86* (146); Clea Smith 2/13 (10 overs)

India Women won by 5 wickets
Indian Petrochemicals Corporation Limited Sports Complex Ground, Vadodara
Umpires: Darabshah Doodhwala (Ind) and V Dongra (Ind)
Player of the match: Mithali Raj (Ind)

- India Women won the toss and elected to field.
- Monica Sumra (Ind) made her WODI debut.

=== 7th ODI ===
28 December 2004
Scorecard

India; 165/9 (50 overs)	v	Australia; 77 (36.4 overs)
Anju Jain 39 (75); Cathryn Fitzpatrick 4/25 (10 overs)		Julie Hayes 22 (59); Nooshin Al Khadeer 3/14 (7.4 overs)

India Women won by 88 runs
Mayajaal Sports Village, Chennai
Umpires: S Ramji (Ind) and SM Raju (Ind)
Player of the match: Amita Sharma (Ind)

- India Women won the toss and elected to bat.
