= Rekha (given name) =

Rekha, is a Sanskrit word, meaning line. It is a common feminine given name in India and Nepal.

== Rekha ==
There are various figurative meanings of the name Rekha. Some are:

- the lines of adorning deities or their followers, such as the three cross-wise white lines adorning Shiva's forehead or the two vertical lines adorning Rama's
- the written lines of the Vedas—the visual rendering of the text itself—considered sacred and beautiful as the means by which the tradition is preserved
- lines of light such as the radiance of the sun, moon or the halo of a deity
- the arc, journey, or path of a person or character in a story, or plot of the story itself

== Notable people ==
- Rekha, Indian Bollywood actress
- Rekha Mallick (born 1928), Indian Bollywood actress
- Rekha (Tamil actress), Indian Tamil film actress
- Rekha Bhardwaj, Indian playback singer
- Rekha Godbole, former Indian cricketer
- Rekha Hande, former Indian model and Miss India
- Rekha Punekar, former Indian cricketer
- Rekha Sharma, Canadian actress
- Rekha Shankar, American actress and comedian
- Rekha Thapa, Nepalese actress and model
- Rekha Yadav, Indian politician
- DJ Rekha, Indian musician and disco jockey
- Rekha Vedavyas, also known as Akshara, Indian Kannada film actress
- Rekha Maruthiraj, better known by her stage name Monica, Indian film actress
