= Henshilwood =

Henshilwood is a surname. Notable people with the surname include:

- Cheryl Henshilwood (born 1952), New Zealand cricketer
- Christopher Henshilwood, South African archaeologist
- Elizabeth Henshilwood (born 1975), British rower
- Linda Henshilwood, later known as Linda Rose Lindsay (born 1950), New Zealand cricketer
