= Shubhangi =

Shubhangi is a given name. Notable people with the name include:

- Shubhangi Atre (born 1981), Indian television actress
- Shubhangi Gokhale (born 1968), Indian actress
- Shubhangi Kulkarni (born 1959), Indian cricketer
- Shubhangi Latkar (born 1972), Indian film actress
