= Lopamudra (disambiguation) =

Lopamudra was a female philosopher according to ancient Vedic Indian literature.

Lopamudra may also refer to:

- Lopamudra Bhattacharji (born 1960), Indian cricketer
- Lopamudra Mitra, Bengali singer
- Lopamudra Raut (born 1991), Indian model and actress
- Lopamudra, a 1930 novel by Kanaiyalal Maneklal Munshi
