= Mithu Mukherjee =

Mithu Mukherjee may refer to:

- Mithu Mukherjee (cricketer) (born 1965), Indian Test cricketer
- Mithu Mukherjee (actress) (1955–2026), Indian actress
