= Behroze Edulji =

Indian cricketer (born 1950)

Personal information
- Full name: Behroze Edulji
- Born: 13 April 1950 (age 76); Bombay, India
- Batting: Left-handed
- Bowling: Left-arm medium fast

International information
- National side: India
- Only Test (cap 2): 31 October 1976 v West Indies

Career statistics
Competition	WTest
Matches	1
Runs scored	0
Batting average	0.00
100s/50s	0/0
Top score	0
Balls bowled	89
Wickets	0
Bowling average	–
5 wickets in innings	–
10 wickets in match	–
Best bowling	–
Catches/stumpings	0/–
- Source: CricketArchive, 24 April 2020

Behroze Edulji (born 13 April 1950) is a former Test cricketer who represented India. Her sister Diana Edulji is also a former Indian Test cricketer.

She was among the handful few who were awarded cheque of 15 lakhs each, recognizing their contribution to Indian cricket by the BCCI.
