= Minoti Desai =

Indian cricketer

Personal information
- Full name: Minoti Desai
- Born: 15 March 1968 (age 58); Indore, Madhya Pradesh, India
- Nickname: Choti, Maddy, Monty
- Height: 5 ft 8 in (1.73 m)
- Batting: Left-handed
- Bowling: Left-arm spin
- Role: Batter

International information
- National side: India
- Only Test (cap 31): 26 June 1986 v England
- Only ODI (cap 32): 22 June 1986 v England

Career statistics
Competition	Test	ODI
Matches	1	1
Runs scored	56	–
Batting average	28.00	–
100s/50s	0/1	–
Top score	54	–
Balls bowled	18	–
Wickets	0	–
Bowling average	–	–
5 wickets in innings	–	–
10 wickets in match	–	–
Best bowling	–	–
Catches/stumpings	0/–	0/–
- Source: CricketArchive, 28 April 2020

Minoti Desai (born 15 March 1968) is a former Test and One Day International cricketer who represented India. She is a left-handed batsman and bowls left-arm orthodox. She has only played one Test and one ODI for India, both against England in June 1986.

She holds the national record for highest score (150) in the finals of senior national tournament, playing for Indian railways in 1988 Chennai Nationals she scored 150 runs against Karnataka.

She also holds record for being the Best batswoman in three consecutive Junior nationals in the years 1985 to 1987. She is the only woman cricketer who has been captain of both Senior and Junior combined Indian university teams. In her captaincy junior combined university team was National champion in 1987 Kottayam nationals.

She was employed by Western Railways. She left railways in 1992 to play for her own state Madhya Pradesh. Under her captaincy, Madhya Pradesh was the joint-winner, alongside Railways, in the National Women's Cricket Championship held in Delhi in 1993-94.

She retired from cricket at the age of 25 years. She is currently working for ministry of finance.
