= List of India women ODI cricketers =

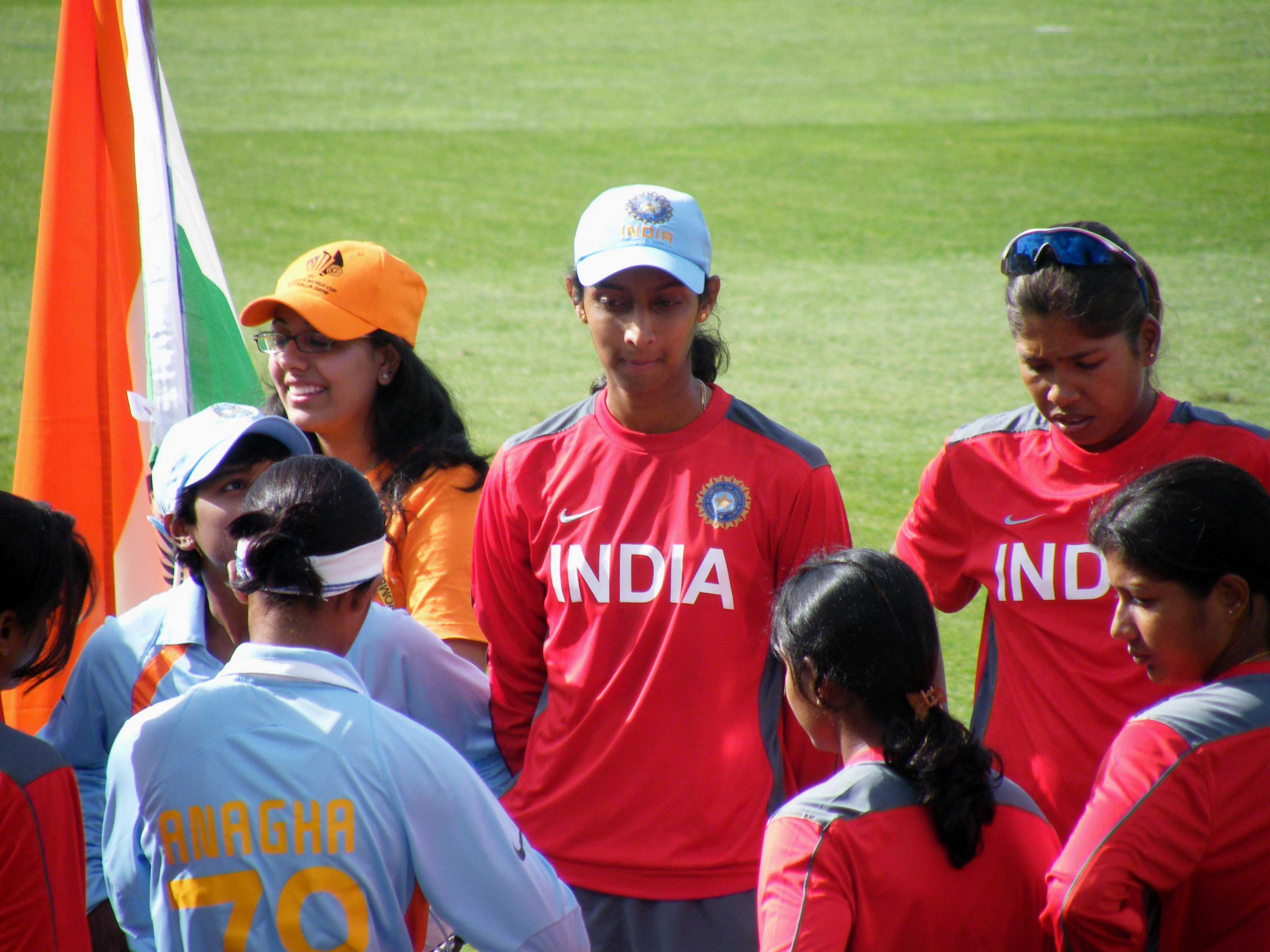
Members of the Indian cricket team before a Women's Cricket World Cup game in Sydney

A One Day International (ODI) is an international cricket match between two teams, each having ODI status, as determined by the International Cricket Council. The women's variant of the game is similar to the men's version, with minor modifications to umpiring and pitch requirements. The first women's ODI was played in 1973, between England and Australia. The Indian women's team played their first ever ODI match in 1978, against England, after the Women's Cricket Association of India was formed. The Women's Cricket Association of India was merged with the Board of Control for Cricket in India in 2006 as part of the International Cricket Council's initiative to develop women's cricket.

Since the team was formed, 151 women have represented India in ODI cricket. This list includes all players who have played at least one ODI match and is arranged in the order of debut appearance. Where more than one player won their first cap in the same match, those players are listed alphabetically by last name at the time of debut.

== Key ==
General

- ‡ – Captain
- † – Wicket-keeper
- First – Year of debut
- Last – Year of latest game
- Mat – Number of matches played

Fielding

- Ca – Catches taken
- St – Stumpings effected

Batting

- Runs – Runs scored in career
- HS – Highest score
- 100 – Centuries scored
- 50 – Half-centuries scored
- Avg – Runs scored per dismissal
- * – Batsman remained not out

Bowling

- Balls – Balls bowled in career
- Wkt – Wickets taken in career
- BBM – Best bowling in a match
- Ave – Average runs per wicket

Captains

- Won – Number of games won
- Lost – Number of games lost
- Tie – Number of games tied
- NR – Number of games with no result
- Win% – Ratio of games won to those captained (Note: Games that did not have a result are not included in calculating the win ratio.)

== ODI cricketers ==
Statistics are correct as of 28 October 2026.

India Women ODI cricketers
No	Name	First	Last	Mat	Batting					Bowling					Fielding	
No	Name	First	Last	Mat	Runs	HS	100	50	Avg	Balls	Wkt	BBM	Ave	5WI	Ca	St
1	Gargi Banerjee	1978	1986	26	409	61	0	2	15.73	291	6	2/23	28.66	0	6	–
2	Runa Basu	1978	1985	6	26	10	0	0	13.00	186	0	–	–	–	2	–
3	Lopamudra Bhattacharji	1978	1982	15	40	14*	0	0	4.44	480	8	3/18	26.75	0	4	–
4	Sharmila Chakraborty	1978	1984	14	23	14*	0	0	11.50	638	17	4/11	15.88	0	2	–
5	Diana Edulji ‡	1978	1993	34	211	25	0	0	8.79	1961	46	4/12	16.84	0	9	–
6	Nilima Jogalekar †	1978	1985	20	193	38	0	0	11.35	6	0	–	–	–	11	4
7	Fowzieh Khalili †	1978	1982	13	258	88	0	1	19.84	–	–	–	–	–	7	14
8	Sandhya Mazumdar	1978	1978	1	4	4	0	0	4.00	–	–	–	–	–	0	–
9	Shobha Pandit	1978	1978	3	42	21	0	0	14.00	12	1	1/10	10.00	0	0	–
10	Kalpan Paropkari	1978	1978	3	23	13	0	0	7.66	–	–	–	–	–	0	–
11	Anjali Sharma	1978	1978	3	1	1	0	0	0.33	158	2	1/32	42.50	0	0	–
12	Susan Itticheria	1978	1978	2	14	8*	0	0	14.00	102	1	1/16	37.00	0	0	–
13	Shubhangi Kulkarni ‡	1978	1986	27	347	44	0	0	13.34	1150	38	4/27	17.60	0	4	–
14	Ujwala Nikam	1978	1978	2	31	31	0	0	15.50	–	–	–	–	–	0	–
15	Sudha Shah	1978	1986	13	293	53	0	1	24.41	270	2	1/7	78.00	0	2	–
16	Rajeshwari Dholakia	1978	1982	13	138	35	0	0	12.54	–	–	–	–	–	0	–
17	Vrinda Bhagat	1982	1982	11	63	18*	0	0	7.87	12	0	–	–	–	0	–
18	Anjali Pendharker	1982	1985	19	268	47	0	0	16.75	12	0	–	–	–	0	–
19	Shantha Rangaswamy ‡	1982	1986	19	287	50	0	1	15.10	902	12	3/25	29.41	0	6	–
20	Sandra Braganza	1982	1993	20	44	11	0	0	6.28	1014	25	4/24	20.24	0	1	–
21	Sujata Sridhar	1982	1986	6	19	14	0	0	3.80	222	1	1/27	137.00	0	1	–
22	Rita Dey †	1984	1995	6	84	33	0	0	16.80	–	–	–	–	–	3	3
23	Arunadhati Ghosh	1984	1986	11	108	45*	0	0	15.42	318	9	4/17	20.88	0	2	–
24	Shashi Gupta	1984	1993	20	263	50*	0	1	20.23	846	15	3/17	23.46	0	3	–
25	Rekha Godbole	1984	1985	4	78	44	0	0	26.00	–	–	–	–	–	0	–
26	Sandhya Agarwal	1984	1995	21	567	72	0	4	31.50	–	–	–	–	–	4	–
27	Sreerupa Bose	1985	1985	2	7	7	0	0	7.00	78	0	–	–	–	0	–
28	Rita Patel	1985	1985	1	1	1	0	0	1.00	–	–	–	–	–	0	–
29	Neeta Kadam	1985	1985	2	17	17	0	0	17.00	24	0	–	–	–	0	–
30	Manimala Singhal †	1985	1986	6	12	5	0	0	3.00	–	–	–	–	–	1	2
31	Rajani Venugopal	1985	1995	9	92	54	0	1	13.14	–	–	–	–	–	1	–
32	Minoti Desai	1986	1986	1	–	–	–	–	–	–	–	–	–	–	0	–
33	Rekha Punekar	1986	1986	1	–	–	–	–	–	–	–	–	–	–	0	–
34	Venkatacher Kalpana †	1986	1993	8	69	31	0	0	9.85	–	–	–	–	–	6	10
35	Chanderkanta Kaul ‡	1993	2000	31	616	80	0	3	23.69	–	–	–	–	–	4	–
36	Pramila Bhatt ‡	1993	1997	22	136	33*	0	0	12.35	1158	28	4/25	18.92	0	4	–
37	Laya Francis	1993	1995	11	13	6	0	0	2.60	510	7	2/15	27.28	0	0	–
38	Anju Jain ‡ †	1993	2005	65	1729	90	0	12	29.81	–	–	–	–	–	30	51
39	Mamatha Maben ‡	1993	2004	40	359	53*	0	1	17.95	436	21	6/10	12.14	1	13	–
40	Purnima Rau ‡	1993	2000	33	516	67*	0	2	21.50	1557	50	4/26	16.88	0	8	–
41	Sangita Dabir	1993	1997	19	156	31	0	0	11.14	936	20	4/22	21.10	0	2	–
42	Anjum Chopra ‡	1995	2012	127	2856	100	1	18	31.38	601	9	2/9	46.00	0	33	–
43	Neetu David	1995	2008	97	74	18*	0	0	4.93	4892	141	5/20	16.34	2	21	–
44	Smitha Harikrishna	1995	2000	22	231	34	0	0	17.76	528	8	2/10	29.00	0	3	–
45	Renu Margrate	1995	2000	23	78	21	0	0	7.09	799	10	2/13	36.70	0	4	–
46	Rishijae Mudgal	1995	1995	6	15	15	0	0	3.75	–	–	–	–	–	1	–
47	Arati Vaidya	1995	1995	6	162	77	0	1	27.00	24	1	1/11	22.00	0	0	–
48	Kalyani Dhokarikar	1995	2000	8	24	11	0	0	4.80	240	3	2/20	39.00	0	0	–
49	Manju Nadgoda	1995	1995	1	1	1	0	0	1.00	–	–	–	–	–	0	–
50	Shyama Shaw	1995	1997	5	22	11	0	0	7.33	6	0	–	–	–	0	–
51	Lissy Samuel	1995	1995	1	–	–	–	–	–	48	0	–	–	–	0	–
52	Deepa Marathe	1997	2005	59	96	21*	0	0	7.38	2682	60	4/1	20.83	0	18	–
53	Purnima Choudhary	1997	1997	5	20	11*	0	0	20.00	150	6	5/21	10.66	1	0	–
54	Reshma Gandhi †	1999	1999	2	122	104*	1	0	–	–	–	–	–	–	1	1
55	Hemlata Kala	1999	2008	78	1023	65	0	3	20.87	385	8	3/31	35.75	0	11	–
56	Mithali Raj ‡	1999	2022	232	7805	125*	7	64	50.68	171	8	3/4	11.37	0	64	–
57	Rupanjali Shastri	1999	2000	12	115	29*	0	0	16.42	578	17	3/25	19.00	0	7	–
58	Sunita Singh	2000	2002	18	24	12	0	0	4.00	790	12	2/8	28.83	0	0	–
59	Arundhati Kirkire †	2000	2005	30	304	106	1	1	19.00	128	7	3/13	10.28	0	9	4
60	Kavita Roy	2000	2000	1	–	–	–	–	–	60	2	2/21	10.50	0	0	–
61	Jhulan Goswami ‡	2002	2022	204	1228	57	0	1	14.61	10005	255	6/31	22.048	2	69	–
62	Jaya Sharma	2002	2008	77	2091	138*	2	14	30.75	–	–	–	–	–	11	–
63	Nooshin Al Khadeer	2002	2012	78	153	21	0	0	8.05	4036	100	5/14	26.64	1	17	–
64	Amrita Pratapsinh Shinde	2002	2002	5	93	78	0	1	23.25	96	0	–	–	–	2	–
65	Bindeshwari Goyal	2002	2003	4	1	1*	0	0	–	168	4	3/3	20.25	0	0	–
66	Sulakshana Naik †	2002	2013	46	574	79*	0	2	15.51	–	–	–	–	–	28	32
67	Sunetra Paranjpe	2002	2007	28	322	52	0	1	15.33	573	11	4/8	37.81	0	3	–
68	Amita Sharma	2002	2014	116	926	51*	0	1	16.83	4552	87	4/16	32.52	0	35	–
69	Rumeli Dhar ‡	2003	2012	78	961	92*	0	6	19.61	3015	63	4/19	27.38	0	37	–
70	Reema Malhotra	2003	2013	41	462	59*	0	1	21.00	845	22	3/31	30.54	0	4	–
71	Babita Mandlik	2003	2003	3	6	5*	0	0	3.00	–	–	–	–	–	0	–
72	Mamata Kanojia	2003	2012	7	61	30	0	0	15.25	204	4	3/48	45.25	0	1	–
73	Beas Sarkar	2003	2003	1	–	–	–	–	–	60	0	–	–	–	0	–
74	Diana David	2004	2012	15	52	24	0	0	4.72	727	15	3/39	27.06	0	5	–
75	Karu Jain †	2004	2014	44	987	103	1	9	29.02	–	–	–	–	–	32	26
76	Varsha Raffel	2004	2006	9	16	7	0	0	4.00	409	11	3/22	20.72	0	0	–
77	Monica Sumra	2004	2006	14	304	63*	0	3	27.63	–	–	–	–	–	0	–
78	Asha Rawat	2005	2008	20	286	97	0	3	40.85	–	–	–	–	–	4	–
79	Sravanthi Naidu	2005	2009	4	2	2	0	0	1.00	66	1	1/14	67.00	0	0	–
80	Devika Palshikar	2006	2008	15	66	22*	0	0	13.20	366	12	3/12	18.00	0	4	–
81	Preeti Dimri	2006	2010	23	23	12*	0	0	11.50	1217	28	3/14	23.21	0	4	–
82	Nidhi Buley	2006	2006	1	–	–	–	–	–	42	1	1/24	24.00	0	0	–
83	Thirush Kamini	2006	2017	39	825	113*	2	3	25.78	384	9	3/19	30.11	0	5	–
84	Rajeshwari Goyal	2006	2007	5	2	2*	0	0	2.00	199	3	2/12	24.00	0	0	–
85	Seema Pujare	2008	2008	8	10	5	0	0	5.00	330	11	3/10	20.18	0	0	–
86	Priyanka Roy	2008	2011	27	333	69*	0	1	16.65	666	19	4/14	22.57	0	8	–
87	Gouher Sultana	2008	2014	50	96	22	0	0	10.66	2308	66	4/4	19.39	0	15	–
88	Anagha Deshpande †	2008	2014	23	414	47	0	0	18.81	–	–	–	–	–	12	19
89	Snehal Pradhan	2008	2011	6	13	6*	0	0	13.00	216	5	3/21	27.40	0	1	–
90	Niranjana Nagarajan	2008	2016	22	70	12*	0	0	7.00	271	9	2/15	28.04	0	3	–
91	Harmanpreet Kaur ‡	2009	2026	167	4667	171*	8	24	37.94	1742	31	2/16	49.45	0	68	–
92	Poonam Raut	2009	2021	73	2299	109*	3	15	34.83	30	1	1/4	4.00	0	15	–
93	Soniya Dabir	2010	2011	4	52	31*	0	0	26.00	126	4	2/37	24.00	0	1	–
94	Samantha Lobatto †	2011	2011	3	1	1*	0	0	–	–	–	–	–	–	2	2
95	Neha Tanwar	2011	2011	5	47	19	0	0	9.40	42	0	–	–	–	1	–
96	Veda Krishnamurthy †	2011	2018	48	829	71	0	8	25.90	114	3	2/14	22.00	0	20	1
97	Ekta Bisht	2011	2022	63	172	18*	0	0	8.19	3399	98	5/8	21.83	2	16	–
98	Shilpa Gupta	2011	2011	1	4	4	0	0	4.00	30	0	–	–	0	–	
99	Archana Das	2012	2013	11	35	17*	0	0	11.66	567	13	4/61	27.53	0	1	–
100	Madhuri Mehta	2012	2012	2	25	23	0	0	12.50	–	–	–	–	–	0	–
101	Shubhlakshmi Sharma	2012	2014	10	11	4	0	0	2.20	456	7	2/17	48.42	0	2	–
102	Mona Meshram	2012	2019	26	352	78*	0	3	18.52	144	1	1/15	119.00	0	10	–
103	Rasanara Parwin	2013	2013	1	–	–	–	–	–	42	0	–	–	–	0	–
104	Ritu Dhrub	2013	2013	3	2	2	0	0	2.00	126	2	1/11	33.50	0	2	–
105	Swagatika Rath	2013	2013	3	58	30	0	0	29.00	120	3	2/15	24.33	0	1	–
106	Smriti Mandhana	2013	2026	123	5443	136	14	35	47.33	36	1	1/13	47.00	0	44	–
107	Poonam Yadav	2013	2022	58	95	15	0	0	7.91	3036	80	4/13	25.15	0	13	–
108	Sneha Deepthi	2013	2013	1	4	4	0	0	4.00	–	–	–	–	–	0	–
109	Rajeshwari Gayakwad	2014	2022	64	21	5	0	0	2.33	3399	99	5/15	20.79	1	13	–
110	Sneh Rana	2014	2026	45	424	53*	1	0	17.66	2252	59	5/43	31.30	1	20	–
111	Vellaswamy Vanitha	2014	2014	6	85	27	0	0	17.00	–	–	–	–	–	1	–
112	Shikha Pandey	2014	2021	55	512	59	0	2	20.48	2472	75	4/18	21.92	0	11	–
113	Sushma Verma †	2014	2021	43	193	41	0	0	9.65	–	–	–	–	–	28	21
114	Deepti Sharma	2014	2026	127	2877	188	2	18	37.36	6348	171	6/20	27.40	4	42	–
115	Ravi Kalpana †	2015	2016	7	4	3	0	0	2.00	–	–	–	–	–	4	1
116	Preeti Bose	2016	2016	1	–	–	–	–	–	48	2	2/8	4.00	0	0	–
117	Sukanya Parida	2016	2016	1	–	–	–	–	–	30	0	–	–	–	0	–
118	Devika Vaidya	2016	2023	12	179	89	0	1	25.57	367	12	3/30	20.25	0	2	–
119	Soni Yadav	2017	2017	1	–	–	–	–	–	48	0	–	–	–	0	–
120	Mansi Joshi	2017	2021	14	20	12	0	0	6.66	572	16	3/16	23.68	0	5	–
121	Nuzhat Parween	2017	2017	1	–	–	–	–	–	–	–	–	–	–	1	–
122	Pooja Vastrakar	2018	2024	33	585	67	0	4	25.43	1158	27	4/34	39.81	0	6	–
123	Jemimah Rodrigues	2018	2026	62	1810	127*	3	8	34.15	43	5	4/3	3.60	0	22	–
124	Taniya Bhatia †	2018	2022	19	138	68	0	1	15.33	–	–	–	–	–	18	9
125	Dayalan Hemalatha	2018	2024	12	97	35	0	0	12.12	218	5	2/6	37.80	0	3	–
126	Harleen Deol	2019	2026	39	1083	115	1	4	31.85	90	2	1/7	40.50	0	15	–
127	Priya Punia	2019	2024	12	273	75*	0	2	27.30	–	–	–	–	–	1	–
128	Monica Patel	2021	2021	2	13	9	0	0	6.50	80	0	–	–	–	0	–
129	Radha Yadav	2021	2025	14	105	48	0	0	17.50	650	13	4/69	50.92	0	12	–
130	Challuru Prathyusha	2021	2021	1	2	2	0	0	2.00	54	1	1/60	60.00	0	0	–
131	Shafali Verma	2021	2026	35	868	87	0	7	27.12	258	4	2/36	52.50	0	9	–
132	Yastika Bhatia †	2021	2026	29	666	64	0	4	23.78	–	–	–	–	–	15	11
133	Richa Ghosh †	2021	2026	56	1215	96	0	7	28.25	–	–	–	–	–	36	9
134	Meghna Singh	2021	2023	17	33	12*	0	0	11.00	722	16	3/26	37.00	0	1	–
135	Sabbhineni Meghana	2022	2022	3	114	61	0	1	38.00	–	–	–	–	–	1	–
136	Simran Bahadur	2022	2022	1	–	–	–	–	–	18	0	–	–	–	0	–
137	Renuka Singh	2022	2026	29	21	8*	0	0	2.33	1412	42	5/29	27.57	1	2	–
138	Anusha Bareddy	2023	2023	1	2	2	0	0	2.00	6	0	–	–	0	0	–
139	Amanjot Kaur	2023	2026	17	257	57	0	1	21.41	665	19	4/31	35.94	0	4	–
140	Saika Ishaque	2023	2023	1	8	8	0	0	8.00	36	0	–	–	0	0	–
141	Shreyanka Patil	2023	2024	3	7	5*	0	0	7.00	180	5	3/57	27.00	0	2	–
142	Mannat Kashyap	2024	2024	1	6	6	0	0	6.00	18	0	–	–	0	0	–
143	Asha Sobhana	2024	2024	2	8	8*	0	0	–	106	4	4/21	18.50	0	0	–
144	Arundhati Reddy	2024	2025	11	58	14	0	0	9.66	548	15	4/26	32.66	0	11	–
145	Tejal Hasabnis	2024	2026	8	143	53*	0	1	35.75	–	–	–	–	–	2	–
146	Saima Thakor	2024	2025	10	46	29	0	0	7.66	425	7	3/62	52.71	0	3	–
147	Priya Mishra	2024	2025	9	6	5	0	0	3.00	406	15	3/49	26.60	0	0	–
148	Titas Sadhu	2024	2025	8	9	4	0	0	3.00	368	6	2/42	50.66	0	1	–
149	Minnu Mani	2024	2025	3	54	46*	0	0	54.00	120	3	2/71	43.00	0	2	–
150	Pratika Rawal	2024	2026	30	1409	154	3	10	54.19	209	6	2/37	31.33	0	5	–
151	Tanuja Kanwar	2024	2025	2	–	–	–	–	–	108	2	2/31	37.50	0	0	–
152	Sayali Satghare	2025	2026	6	2	2*	0	0	–	270	6	2/11	30.66	0	3	–
153	Kashvee Gautam	2025	2026	6	90	43	0	0	22.50	266	3	2/47	86.66	1	0	–
154	Shree Charani	2025	2026	23	22	11	0	0	3.66	1196	32	4/23	34.09	0	5	–
155	Shuchi Upadhyay	2025	2025	1	–	–	–	–	–	54	0	–	–	0	0	–
156	Kranti Goud	2025	2026	19	44	19	0	0	8.80	868	30	6/52	26.96	1	7	–
157	Uma Chetry	2025	2025	1	–	–	–	–	–	–	–	–	–	–	–	–
158	Vaishnavi Sharma	2026	2026	3	10	10*	0	0	–	144	9	5/39	12.44	1	0	–
159	Jintimani Kalita	2026	2026	3	–	–	–	–	–	113	1	1/34	84.00	0	3	–

== ODI captains ==
No	Name	First	Last	Mat	Won	Lost	Tied	NR	Win%
1	Diana Edulji	1978	1993	18	7	11	0	0	38.88%
2	Shanta Rangaswamy	1982	1984	16	4	12	0	0	25.00%
3	Shubhangi Kulkarni	1986	1986	1	0	1	0	0	0.00%
4	Purnima Rau	1995	1995	8	5	3	0	0	62.50%
5	Pramila Bhatt	1995	1997	7	5	1	1	0	78.57%
6	Chanderkanta Kaul	1999	1999	4	3	1	0	0	75.00%
7	Anju Jain	2000	2000	8	5	3	0	0	62.50%
8	Anjum Chopra	2002	2012	28	10	17	0	1	37.03%
9	Mamatha Maben	2003	2004	19	14	5	0	0	73.68%
10	Mithali Raj	2004	2022	155	89	63	0	3	58.55%
11	Jhulan Goswami	2008	2011	25	12	13	0	0	48.00%
12	Rumeli Dhar	2008	2008	1	0	1	0	0	0.00%
13	Harmanpreet Kaur	2013	2025	48	30	16	1	0	64.89%
14	Smriti Mandhana	2024	2026	7	7	0	0	0	100.00%
