= Uthpala Chakraborty =

Indian cricketer

Personal information
- Full name: Uthpala Chakraborty
- Born: Delhi, India

International information
- National side: India
- Only Test (cap 15): 27 November 1976 v West Indies
- Source: ESPNCricinfo, 26 April 2020

Uthpala Chakraborty is a former Test cricketer who represented India. Her sister Sharmila Chakraborty is also a former Indian Test cricketer.
