= Asha Rawat =

Indian cricketer (born 1982)

Personal information
- Full name: Asha Rawat
- Born: 16 February 1982 (age 44); Delhi, India
- Batting: Right-handed
- Bowling: Right-arm off break
- Role: Batter

International information
- National side: India (2005–2008)
- Only Test (cap 67): 21 November 2005 v England
- ODI debut (cap 78): 7 December 2005 v England
- Last ODI: 9 September 2008 v England

Domestic team information
- Years: Team
- 2003/04–2005/06: Delhi
- 2006/07: Railways
- 2007/08: Delhi
- 2008/09–2010/11: Railways
- 2012/13–2013/14: Delhi

Career statistics
Competition	WTest	WODI	WLA	WT20
Matches	1	20	72	30
Runs scored	9	286	1,235	190
Batting average	9.00	40.85	31.66	19.00
100s/50s	0/0	0/3	0/8	0/0
Top score	9	97	98*	35*
Balls bowled	12	–	102	–
Wickets	0	–	2	–
Bowling average	–	–	18.00	–
5 wickets in innings	0	–	0	–
10 wickets in match	0	–	0	–
Best bowling	–	–	1/1	–
Catches/stumpings	0/–	4/–	20/–	10/–
- Source: CricketArchive, 28 August 2022

Asha Rawat (Hindi: आशा रावत; born 16 February 1982) is an Indian former cricketer who played as a right-handed batter. She appeared in one Test match and 20 One Day Internationals for India from 2005 to 2008. She played domestic cricket for Delhi and Railways.
