= Vrinda Bhagat =

Indian cricketer (born 1959)

Personal information
- Full name: Vrinda Bhagat
- Born: 26 January 1959 (age 67); India
- Bowling: Right-arm offbreak

International information
- National side: India
- Test debut (cap 17): 21 January 1984 v Australia
- Last Test: 28 January 1984 v Australia
- ODI debut (cap 17): 10 January 1982 v Australia
- Last ODI: 6 February 1982 v International XI

Career statistics
Competition	WTest	WODI
Matches	2	11
Runs scored	34	63
Batting average	8.50	7.87
100s/50s	0/0	0/0
Top score	16	18*
Balls bowled	54	12
Wickets	2	0
Bowling average	12.00	–
5 wickets in innings	0	0
10 wickets in match	0	0
Best bowling	1/8	–
Catches/stumpings	2/0	0/0
- Source: CricketArchive, 17 September 2009

Vrinda Bhagat (born 26 January 1959) is a former Test and One Day International cricketer who represented India. She played a total of two Tests and 11 ODIs and represented India at 1982 Women's Cricket World Cup.
