= Shubhlakshmi Sharma =

Indian cricketer (born 1989)

Personal information
- Born: 31 December 1989 (age 36); Hazaribagh, Jharkhand, India
- Batting: Right-handed
- Bowling: Right-arm medium

International information
- National side: India
- Only Test (cap 80): 13 August 2014 v England
- ODI debut (cap 101): 16 March 2012 v Australia
- Last ODI: 28 November 2014 v South Africa
- T20I debut (cap 31): 23 February 2012 v West Indies
- Last T20I: 13 July 2015 v New Zealand

Career statistics
Competition	Test	ODI	T20I
Matches	1	10	18
Runs scored	4	11	25
Batting average	4.00	8.50	3.57
100s/50s	0/0	0/0	0/0
Top score	4	4	10
Balls bowled	108	456	324
Wickets	4	7	15
Bowling average	8.50	48.42	19.80
5 wickets in innings	0	0	0
10 wickets in match	0	0	0
Best bowling	2/12	2/17	3/12
Catches/stumpings	0/–	2/–	3/–
- Source: ESPNcricinfo

Shubhlakshmi Sharma (born 31 December 1989) is an Indian cricketer. She is a right-hand batter and right-arm medium-pace bowler.

== Early life ==
Shubhlakshmi Sharma was born in Hazaribagh, Jharkhand.
