= Kavita Roy =

Indian cricketer (born 1980)

Personal information
- Born: 10 April 1980 (age 46); Hajipur, India
- Nickname: Polly
- Batting: Right-handed
- Bowling: Right-arm medium

International information
- National side: India
- Only ODI (cap 60): 15 December 2000 v Sri Lanka

Career statistics
Competition	WODI
Matches	1
Runs scored	–
Batting average	–
100s/50s	–
Top score	–
Balls bowled	60
Wickets	2
Bowling average	10.50
5 wickets in innings	0
10 wickets in match	0
Best bowling	2/21
Catches/stumpings	0/–
- Source: CricketArchive, 8 May 2020

Kavita Roy (born 10 April 1980) is a former One Day International (ODI) cricketer who has represented India. Her debut match for India was also her only international match. She is a right-hand batsman and bowls right-arm medium pace.
