= Viv Stephens =

New Zealand cricketer (1953–2021)

Personal information
- Full name: Vivian Sherill Stephens
- Born: 8 November 1953; Foxton, New Zealand
- Died: 5 September 2021 (aged 67); Napier, New Zealand
- Batting: Right-handed
- Bowling: Right-arm medium
- Role: Batter

International information
- National side: New Zealand (1978)
- ODI debut (cap 23): 1 January 1978 v Australia
- Last ODI: 8 January 1978 v England

Domestic team information
- Years: Team
- 1974/75–1978/79: Wellington
- 1979/80–1981/82: Central Districts

Career statistics
Competition	WODI	WFC	WLA
Matches	2	22	15
Runs scored	12	705	250
Batting average	6.00	24.31	25.00
100s/50s	0/0	1/1	0/1
Top score	9	135	70
Balls bowled	–	618	306
Wickets	–	16	9
Bowling average	–	23.43	19.22
5 wickets in innings	–	0	0
10 wickets in match	–	0	0
Best bowling	–	3/48	3/32
Catches/stumpings	0/–	14/–	8/–
- Source: CricketArchive, 6 November 2021

Vivian Sherill Stephens (née Sexton; 8 November 1953 – 5 September 2021) was a New Zealand cricketer who played primarily as a right-handed batter. She appeared in two One Day Internationals for New Zealand at the 1978 World Cup. She played domestic cricket for Wellington and Central Districts.

Stephens was born in Foxton, in New Zealand's Manawatū-Whanganui region. While studying teaching, she played for a men's team, as there was no organised women's cricket in her area at the time. She later began to play club cricket in Wellington, and eventually for the Wellington representative team. In 1976 Stephens toured India with New Zealand, playing two three-day first-class matches against the Indian national team. She scored 17 runs across three innings. In 1978, Stephens was selected in New Zealand's squad for the World Cup in India. She made her One Day International (ODI) debut in the first game of the tournament, scoring nine runs coming in sixth in the batting order against Australia. Her only other match at the tournament came against England, where she scored just three runs before being dismissed by Jacqueline Court.

After moving to Napier, where her husband worked, Stephens helped to establish a Central Districts women's team. The team began play during the 1978–79 season and was admitted to the national competition the following season. Follow her retirement from playing, Stephens remained involved in cricket as an administrator. She became a board member of the Central Districts Cricket Association in 2000, representing the Hawke's Bay region. She remained on the board until December 2014, also serving as a member of the association's management committee. Stephens additionally served as a tournament official at the 2000 Women's World Cup, which New Zealand hosted. In November 2015, she was made a life member of the CDCA.

Stephens died in Napier on 5 September 2021.
