= Sujata Sridhar =

Indian cricketer (born 1961)

Personal information
- Full name: Sujata Sridhar
- Born: 25 December 1961 (age 64); India
- Bowling: Right-arm medium fast

International information
- National side: India
- Test debut (cap 21): 21 January 1984 v Australia
- Last Test: 12 July 1986 v England
- ODI debut (cap 21): 10 January 1982 v Australia
- Last ODI: 27 July 1986 v England

Career statistics
Competition	Test	ODI
Matches	3	6
Runs scored	32	19
Batting average	16.00	3.80
100s/50s	0/2	0/0
Top score	20*	14
Balls bowled	336	222
Wickets	3	0
Bowling average	53.33	137
5 wickets in innings	0	0
10 wickets in match	0	0
Best bowling	2/46	1/27
Catches/stumpings	1/0	1/0
- Source: CricketArchive, 17 September 2009

Sujata Sridhar (Tamil: சுஜாதா ஸ்ரீதர்; b. 25 December 1961) is a former Test and One Day International cricketer who represented India. Sujata played as a fast-medium bowler. She played a total of three Tests and six ODIs and represented Tamil Nadu and Karnataka in India's domestic leagues.
