= Karen Marsh =

New Zealand cricketer

Personal information
- Full name: Karen Ann Marsh
- Born: 26 December 1951 (age 74); Whangārei, New Zealand
- Batting: Right-handed
- Bowling: Right-arm fast-medium
- Role: All-rounder
- Relatives: Richard Hadlee (ex-husband)

International information
- National side: New Zealand (1978)
- Only ODI (cap 25): 8 January 1978 v England

Domestic team information
- Years: Team
- 1971/72–1981/82: Canterbury

Career statistics
Competition	WODI	WFC	WLA
Matches	1	24	15
Runs scored	14	258	85
Batting average	14.00	10.32	8.50
100s/50s	0/0	0/1	0/0
Top score	14	73	46
Balls bowled	–	1,254	616
Wickets	–	24	6
Bowling average	–	17.45	52.50
5 wickets in innings	–	0	0
10 wickets in match	–	0	0
Best bowling	–	3/8	2/14
Catches/stumpings	0/–	9/–	5/–
- Source: CricketArchive, 2 November 2021

Karen Ann Marsh (married name Hadlee; born 26 December 1951) is a New Zealand former cricketer who played as a right-handed batter and right-arm fast-medium bowler. She played a single match for New Zealand, at the 1978 World Cup. She played domestic cricket for Canterbury.

Marsh was born in Whangārei, in New Zealand's North Island. A pace-bowling all-rounder, her sole One Day International (ODI) appearance for New Zealand came at the 1978 World Cup in India, against England. Coming in sixth in the batting order, she scored 14 runs from 17 balls, but was not called upon to bowl. Marsh was married to Richard Hadlee, who also played international cricket for New Zealand (both at Test and ODI level). The pair later divorced. They have two sons together.
