= Kalpan Paropkari =

Indian cricketer

Kalpana Paropkari
Personal information
- Full name: Kaplana Paropkari Tapikar
- Born: India
- Batting: Right-handed
- Role: Batsman

International information
- National side: India
- ODI debut (cap 10): 1 January 1978 v England
- Last ODI: 8 January 1978 v Australia

Career statistics
Competition	WODI
Matches	3
Runs scored	23
Batting average	7.66
100s/50s	0/0
Top score	13
Catches/stumpings	0/-
- Source: CricketArchive, 4 May 2020

Kalpana Paropkari Tapikar is a former One Day International cricketer who represented India. She played three One Day Internationals (ODIs), all of them in the 1978 Women's Cricket World Cup. She scored 23 runs in the three ODIs, at an average of 7.66.
