= List of India women Test cricketers =

Test cricket is the longest form of cricket. The women's variant of the game includes four innings to be completed over four days of play with eleven players in each side. The first women's Test was played between England and Australia in 1934. However, India did not play Test cricket until 1973 when the Women's Cricket Association of India was formed. The Indian women's team played their first Test match in 1976, against the West Indies. The Women's Cricket Association of India was merged with the Board of Control for Cricket in India in 2006 as part of the International Cricket Council's initiative to develop women's cricket.

India have played 41 Tests, starting with their first Test in 1976. They first won a Test in Patna (1976), in front of over 25,000 spectators, against the West Indies but did not win again until 2002, when they won against South Africa. The team has remained unbeaten since 2006, over the course of three Test matches.

Two of India's players, Diana Edulji and Sudha Shah, have featured in more than 20 Test matches. Ten other players have played in ten or more Test matches. Sandhya Agarwal is India's all-time leading run scorer, and is ranked sixth among players from all countries. Among the top ten run scorers of all time, she has the fourth-highest average. Sandhya Agarwal and Mithali Raj, with scores of 190 and 214 respectively, were record holders for the most runs scored in an innings. Former captains Diana Edulji and Shubhangi Kulkarni are third and sixth in terms of most wickets taken in a career while Neetu David has the best bowling figures in an innings, having taken 8 wickets, conceding 53 runs in England's second innings in the hundredth women's Test.

Since the team was formed, 94 women have represented India in Test cricket. This list includes all players who have played at least one Test match and is arranged in the order of debut appearance. Where more than one player won their first Test cap in the same Test match, those players are listed alphabetically by last name at the time of debut.

== Key ==
General

- ‡ – Captain
- † – Wicket-keeper
- First – Year of debut
- Last – Year of latest game
- Mat – Number of matches played
- Win% – Winning percentage

Batting

- Inn – Number of innings batted
- NO – Number of innings not dismissed
- Runs – Runs scored in career
- HS – Highest score
- 100 – Centuries scored
- 50 – Half-centuries scored
- Avg – Runs scored per dismissal
- * – Batsman remained not out

Bowling

- Balls – Balls bowled in career
- Wkt – Wickets taken in career
- BBI – Best bowling in an innings
- BBM – Best bowling in a match
- Ave – Average runs per wicket
- + – Bowled more than reported deliveries (Note: West Indies first innings scorecard was incomplete in Women's Test 57, played at Jammu, making it impossible to assign deliveries to individual bowlers for this game.)

Fielding

- Ca – Catches taken
- St – Stumpings effected

== Test cricketers ==
Statistics are correct as of 8 March 2026.

General					Batting						Bowling					Fielding		Ref
Cap	Name	First	Last	Mat	Inn	Runs	HS	100	50	Avg	Balls	Wkt	BBI	BBM	Ave	Ca	St	Ref
1	Sharmila Chakraborty	1976	1984	11	11	35	26	0	0	5.83	1196	19	5/25	7/70	22.10	1	0	
2	Behroze Edulji	1976	1976	1	–	–	–	–	–	–	89	0	–	–	–	0	0	
3	Diana Edulji ‡	1976	1991	20	30	404	57*	0	1	16.16	5098+	63	6/64	6/64	25.77	8	0	
4	Susan Itticheria	1976	1977	7	10	40	11	0	0	6.66	588	7	2/21	2/40	37.14	2	0	
5	Fowzieh Khalili †	1976	1977	8	15	347	84	0	3	26.69	–	–	–	–	–	5	10	
6	Shubhangi Kulkarni ‡	1976	1991	19	32	700	118	1	2	23.33	3320+	60	6/99	7/57	27.45	14	0	
7	Sandhya Mazumdar	1976	1977	6	10	84	22	0	0	8.40	–	–	–	–	–	2	0	
8	Ujwala Nikam	1976	1977	8	12	125	26	0	0	10.41	–	–	–	–	–	2	0	
9	Shobha Pandit	1976	1977	8	14	247	69	0	1	17.64	184	4	1/4	1/4	18.75	1	0	
10	Shantha Rangaswamy ‡	1976	1991	16	26	750	108	1	6	32.60	1555	21	4/42	6/114	31.61	10	0	
11	Sudha Shah	1976	1991	21	38	601	62*	0	1	18.78	842	5	3/28	4/50	64.20	21	0	
12	Runa Basu	1976	1985	5	6	20	5	0	0	3.33	294	2	1/15	1/15	55.50	2	0	
13	Jyotsna Patel	1976	1976	2	2	4	2	0	0	2.00	–	–	–	–	–	0	0	
14	Rajeshwari Dholakia	1976	1977	4	6	40	24*	0	0	20.00	118	1	1/10	1/22	43.00	2	0	
15	Uthpala Chakraborty	1976	1976	1	2	0	0*	0	0	0.00	–	–	–	–	–	0	0	
16	Gargi Banerjee	1984	1991	12	22	614	75*	0	6	27.90	329	8	6/9	6/32	17.12	3	0	
17	Vrinda Bhagat	1984	1984	2	4	34	16	0	0	8.50	54	2	1/8	1/8	12.00	2	0	
18	Shashi Gupta	1984	1991	13	22	452	48*	0	0	28.25	1962	25	4/47	8/100	31.28	2	0	
19	Nilima Jogalekar†‡	1984	1985	6	10	172	41	0	0	17.20	6	0	–	–	–	4	11	
20	Anjali Pendharker	1984	1985	5	8	218	81	0	2	27.25	48	1	1/22	1/22	31.00	1	0	
21	Sujata Sridhar	1984	1986	3	4	32	20*	0	0	16.00	336	3	2/46	2/88	53.33	1	0	
22	Sandhya Agarwal ‡	1984	1995	13	23	1110	190	4	4	50.45	24	1	1/0	1/0	20.00	2	0	
23	Arunadhati Ghosh	1984	1986	8	12	134	41	0	0	13.40	816	5	2/26	2/67	67.60	3	0	
24	Rita Dey †	1984	1985	2	4	84	46	0	0	28.00	2	–	–	–	–	2	0	
25	Sandra Braganza	1985	1991	6	9	45	19*	0	0	15.00	450	4	2/35	2/38	51.00	0	0	
26	Mithu Mukherjee	1985	1991	4	8	76	28	0	0	10.85	322	2	1/32	1/32	84.50	0	0	
27	Lopamudra Bhattacharji	1985	1985	1	1	7	7	0	0	7.00	24	0	–	–	–	0	0	
28	Rekha Godbole †	1985	1985	1	1	6	6	0	0	6.00	–	–	–	–	–	0	2	
29	Rajani Venugopal	1985	1995	6	10	258	58	0	3	25.80	66	0	–	–	–	2	0	
30	Neeta Kadam	1985	1985	1	1	3	3	0	0	3.00	36	0	–	–	–	0	0	
31	Minoti Desai	1986	1986	1	2	56	54	0	1	28.00	18	0	–	–	–	0	0	
32	Venkatacher Kalpana †	1986	1991	3	5	71	34	0	0	14.20	–	–	–	–	–	1	3	
33	Rekha Punekar	1986	1986	2	3	49	47	0	0	16.33	–	–	–	–	–	0	0	
34	Manimala Singhal †	1986	1991	6	10	116	44	0	0	14.50	–	–	–	–	–	5	3	
35	Pramila Bhatt	1991	1995	5	7	123	42	0	0	24.60	1016	9	3/42	5/60	34.77	1	0	
36	Seema Desai	1991	1991	2	4	49	21	0	0	12.25	138	0	–	–	–	0	0	
37	Chanderkanta Kaul ‡	1995	1999	5	9	318	75	0	3	35.33	–	–	–	–	–	0	0	
38	Sangita Dabir	1995	1995	4	7	264	60	0	3	52.80	585	10	4/36	5/63	13.60	6	0	
39	Neetu David	1995	2006	10	11	25	11	0	0	6.25	2662	41	8/53	9/90	18.90	4	0	
40	Laya Francis	1995	1995	4	4	6	4	0	0	1.50	558	4	2/20	4/40	38.75	1	0	
41	Anju Jain †	1995	2003	8	12	441	110	1	3	36.75	–	–	–	–	–	15	8	
42	Renu Margrate	1995	1999	5	6	58	27	0	0	14.50	504	1	1/14	1/20	141.00	1	0	
43	Rishijae Mudgal	1995	1995	2	4	30	24*	0	0	10.00	12	0	–	–	–	3	0	
44	Purnima Rau ‡	1995	1999	5	8	123	33	0	0	15.37	1164	15	5/24	7/98	21.26	1	0	
45	Arati Vaidya	1995	1999	3	6	139	39	0	0	27.80	30	0	–	–	–	0	0	
46	Shyama Shaw	1995	1995	3	5	184	66	0	2	61.33	336	5	3/19	3/62	21.40	1	0	
47	Anjum Chopra ‡	1995	2006	12	20	548	98	0	4	30.44	258	2	1/9	1/9	44.00	13	0	
48	Kalyani Dhokarikar	1999	1999	1	2	25	21	0	0	25.00	192	2	1/17	2/56	28.00	0	0	
49	Hemlata Kala	1999	2006	7	10	503	110	2	3	50.30	206	5	3/18	3/18	19.60	3	0	
50	Deepa Marathe	1999	2003	5	6	67	40	0	0	11.16	1002	8	3/14	3/68	42.25	1	0	
51	Rupanjali Shastri	1999	1999	1	2	15	11	0	0	7.50	240	3	3/54	3/60	20.00	0	0	
52	Jhulan Goswami	2002	2021	12	15	291	69	0	2	24.25	2266	44	5/25	10/78	17.36	5	0	
53	Bindeshwari Goyal	2002	2002	3	3	1	1*	0	0	0.50	738	5	2/23	3/66	42.60	0	0	
54	Arundhati Kirkire†	2002	2002	1	1	3	3	0	0	3.00	–	–	–	–	–	0	0	
55	Mamatha Maben ‡	2002	2003	4	4	125	50	0	1	31.25	54	0	–	–	–	1	0	
56	Mithali Raj ‡	2002	2021	12	19	669	214	1	4	43.68	72	0	–	–	–	12	0	
57	Amrita Shinde	2002	2002	1	1	29	29	0	0	29.00	48	1	1/17	1/17	17.00	1	0	
58	Jaya Sharma	2002	2002	2	2	6	6*	0	0	6.00	318	3	1/13	2/71	35.33	0	0	
59	Sunita Singh	2002	2002	1	1	24	24	0	0	24.00	–	–	–	–	–	1	0	
60	Sulakshana Naik †	2002	2006	2	3	62	25	0	0	20.66	–	–	–	–	–	1	2	
61	Sunetra Paranjpe	2002	2006	3	4	33	30	0	0	11.00	48	0	–	–	–	3	0	
62	Nooshin Al Khadeer	2003	2006	5	7	46	16*	0	0	9.20	1239	14	3/30	4/74	26.64	0	0	
63	Amita Sharma	2003	2006	5	7	82	50	0	1	13.66	748	5	2/19	3/73	50.40	0	0	
64	Rumeli Dhar	2005	2006	4	8	236	57	0	1	29.50	552	8	2/16	2/26	21.75	0	0	
65	Karu Jain †	2005	2014	5	9	195	40	0	0	21.66	–	–	–	–	–	14	3	
66	Sravanthi Naidu	2005	2005	1	1	9	9	0	0	9.00	100	2	2/30	2/62	31.00	0	0	
67	Asha Rawat	2005	2005	1	1	9	9	0	0	9.00	12	0	–	–	–	0	0	
68	Monica Sumra	2005	2006	3	6	61	29	0	0	10.16	–	–	–	–	–	0	0	
69	Devika Palshikar	2006	2006	1	2	7	6	0	0	3.50	54	0	–	–	–	0	0	
70	Nidhi Buley	2006	2006	1	1	0	0*	0	0	–	72	0	–	–	–	0	0	
71	Preeti Dimri	2006	2006	2	3	19	19	0	0	19.00	468	5	3/75	5/118	36.40	0	0	
72	Reema Malhotra	2006	2006	1	2	23	12*	0	0	23.00	18	0	–	–	–	0	0	
73	Ekta Bisht	2014	2014	1	1	0	0*	0	0	–	228	3	2/33	3/44	14.66	0	0	
74	Thirush Kamini	2014	2014	2	3	237	192	1	0	79.00	6	0	–	–	–	0	0	
75	Harmanpreet Kaur	2014	2026	7	11	230	69	0	1	23.00	428	12	5/44	9/85	15.41	1	0	
76	Smriti Mandhana	2014	2026	8	14	635	149	2	3	48.84	12	0	–	–	–	3	0	
77	Niranjana Nagarajan	2014	2014	2	1	27	27	0	0	27.00	236	4	4/19	4/66	23.75	3	0	
78	Shikha Pandey	2014	2021	3	5	55	28*	0	0	18.33	249	4	2/33	3/58	35.25	1	0	
79	Poonam Raut	2014	2021	4	7	264	130	1	0	44.00	–	–	–	–	–	0	0	
80	Shubhlakshmi Sharma	2014	2014	1	1	4	4	0	0	4.00	–	–	–	–	–	0	0	
81	Rajeshwari Gayakwad	2014	2024	5	2	0	0*	0	0	0.00	1079	11	4/54	5/80	33.54	3	0	
82	Poonam Yadav	2014	2014	1	0	–	–	–	–	–	246	3	2/22	3/68	22.66	0	0	
83	Sushma Verma †	2014	2014	1	0	–	–	–	–	–	–	–	–	–	–	4	1	
84	Taniya Bhatia †	2021	2023	2	3	66	44*	0	0	33.00	–	–	–	–	–	4	0	
85	Sneh Rana	2021	2026	5	7	156	80*	0	1	30.25	1059	24	8/77	10/188	22.75	4	0	
86	Shafali Verma	2021	2026	6	12	607	205	1	3	55.18	48	2	1/7	1/7	9.50	3	0	
87	Deepti Sharma	2021	2026	6	10	335	78	0	4	47.85	1083	22	5/7	9/39	19.50	3	0	
88	Pooja Vastrakar	2021	2024	5	6	111	47	0	0	27.75	634	15	4/53	5/93	22.46	0	0	
89	Yastika Bhatia	2021	2021	3	5	98	66	0	1	19.60	–	–	–	–	–	0	0	
90	Meghna Singh	2021	2021	1	1	2	2*	0	0	–	126	2	2/54	2/66	33.00	0	0	
91	Renuka Singh	2023	2024	3	2	9	8	0	0	4.50	300	2	1/30	2/62	90.50	0	0	
92	Jemimah Rodrigues	2023	2026	4	7	301	73	0	4	50.16	12	0	–	–	–	6	0	
93	Shubha Satheesh	2023	2024	2	3	97	69	0	1	48.50	–	–	–	–	–	2	0	
94	Richa Ghosh	2023	2026	3	5	162	86	0	2	32.40	–	–	–	–	–	1	0	
95	Kranti Gaud	2026	2026	1	2	1	1	0	0	1.00	132	2	2/72	2/72	36.00	0	0	
96	Kashvee Gautam	2026	2026	1	2	34	34*	0	0	34.00	81	0	–	–	–	0	0	
97	Pratika Rawal	2026	2026	1	2	81	63	0	1	40.50	–	–	–	–	–	0	0	
98	Sayali Satghare	2026	2026	1	2	10	7	0	0	5.00	124	4	4/50	4/57	14.25	0	0	

== Test captains ==
No.	Name	First	Last	Mat	Won	Lost	Tied	Draw	Win%
1	Shantha Rangaswamy	1976	1984	12	1	2	0	9	8.33%
2	Nilima Jogalekar	1985	1985	1	0	0	0	1	0%
3	Diana Edulji	1985	1986	4	0	0	0	4	0%
4	Shubhangi Kulkarni	1986	1991	3	0	1	0	2	0%
5	Sandhya Agarwal	1991	1991	1	0	1	0	0	0%
6	Purnima Rau	1995	1995	3	0	1	0	2	0%
7	Pramila Bhatt	1995	1995	1	0	0	0	1	0%
8	Chanderkanta Kaul	1999	1999	1	0	0	0	1	0%
9	Anjum Chopra	2002	2002	3	1	0	0	2	33.33%
10	Mamatha Maben	2003	2003	1	0	0	0	1	0%
11	Mithali Raj	2005	2021	8	3	1	0	4	37%
12	Harmanpreet Kaur	2023	2026	4	3	1	0	0	75%
