= Nilima Jogalekar =

Indian cricketer (born 1961)

Nilima Joglekar
Personal information
- Born: 1 July 1961 (age 65); Pune, Maharashtra, India
- Batting: Right-handed
- Role: Wicket-keeper

International information
- National side: India (1978–1985)
- Test debut (cap 19): 21 January 1984 v Australia
- Last Test: 23 February 1985 v New Zealand
- ODI debut (cap 6): 1 January 1978 v England
- Last ODI: 21 February 1985 v New Zealand

Career statistics
Competition	Test	ODI
Matches	5	20
Runs scored	166	193
Batting average	44.44	11.35
100s/50s	0/0	0/0
Top score	41	38
Catches/stumpings	4/9	11/4
- Source: ESPNcricinfo, 27 April 2020

Nilima Jogalekar (born 1 July 1961) is an Indian cricketer. She played as a wicket-keeper and a middle-order batsman. She represented Maharashtra in women's domestic cricket, making her international debut in the 1978 Women's Cricket World Cup as Nilima Barve (her maiden name).

== Career ==
Nilima Jogalekar played 6 Test matches and 20 ODI matches spread over seven years and four international series. She played in the following series:

- 1978 Women's Cricket World Cup (1 ODI)
- 1982 Women's Cricket World Cup (12 ODIs)
- 1983/84 Australia Women in India (4 ODIs and 4 Test matches)
- 1984/85 New Zealand Women in India (3 ODIs and 2 Test matches)

Nilima Jogalekar captained India in one Test match (against New Zealand) when she stood in for Diana Edulji.

In 2016, Jogalekar was felicitated by the Board of Control for Cricket in India on the occasion of India playing its 500th Test against New Zealand at the Green Park Stadium. Among other women captions to be honoured were Diana Edulji, Promila Rao and Shantha Rangaswamy.
