= Catherine Mowat =

English cricketer (born 1952)

Cathy Mowat
Personal information
- Full name: Catherine Mary Mowat
- Born: 20 September 1952 (age 74); Carlisle, Cumberland, England
- Batting: Right-handed
- Bowling: Right-arm medium
- Role: Bowler

International information
- National side: England (1978–1984)
- Test debut (cap 84): 16 June 1979 v West Indies
- Last Test: 14 July 1984 v New Zealand
- ODI debut (cap 23): 1 January 1978 v India
- Last ODI: 13 January 1978 v Australia

Domestic team information
- Years: Team
- 1972–1994: Middlesex

Career statistics
Competition	WTest	WODI	WFC	WLA
Matches	5	3	13	64
Runs scored	0	–	13	70
Batting average	0.00	–	3.25	6.36
100s/50s	0/0	–	0/0	0/0
Top score	0	–	6	10*
Balls bowled	726	84	1,950	3,237
Wickets	15	1	33	61
Bowling average	17.53	28.00	21.60	21.78
5 wickets in innings	0	0	0	0
10 wickets in match	0	0	0	0
Best bowling	4/25	1/2	4/25	4/14
Catches/stumpings	0/–	1/–	4/–	15/–
- Source: CricketArchive, 27 February 2021

Catherine Mary Mowat (born 20 September 1952) is an English former cricketer who played as a right-arm medium bowler. She appeared in 5 Test matches and 3 One Day Internationals for England between 1978 and 1984. She played domestic cricket for Middlesex.
