= Manimala Singhal =

Indian cricketer (born 1965)

Personal information
- Full name: Manimala Singhal
- Born: 11 April 1965 (age 61); Delhi, India
- Batting: Right-handed
- Role: Wicket-keeper

International information
- National side: India
- Test debut (cap 34): 26 June 1986 v England
- Last Test: 9 February 1991 v Australia
- ODI debut (cap 30): 19 February 1985 v New Zealand
- Last ODI: 27 July 1986 v England

Career statistics
Competition	Test	ODI
Matches	6	6
Runs scored	116	12
Batting average	14.50	3.00
100s/50s	0/0	0/0
Top score	44	5
Catches/stumpings	5/3	1/2
- Source: CricketArchive, 18 September 2009

Manimala Singhal (Hindi: मणिमाला सिंघल; born 11 April 1965) is a former Test and One Day International cricketer who represented India. She is a right hand batsman and wicket-keeper. She has played six Tests and six ODIs.
