= Bilakhiya Stadium =

Cricket ground in Vapi, India

Coordinates: 20°24′9″N 72°54′12″E

- Interactive map of Bilakhiya Stadium

Ground information
- Location: Vapi, Gujarat
- Country: India

International information
- Only women's Test: 27 November 2003: India v New Zealand
- Only WODI: 19 December 2004: India v Australia
- As of 8 December 2019; Source: CricketArchive

Bilakhiya Stadium or G. M. Bilakhia Cricket stadium is a cricket ground in Vapi, India. The first recorded match on the ground was in 2002, when it was the venue for a game in the Cooch Behar Trophy. The ground has also hosted a Women's Test match and a Women's ODI.
