= Monica Sumra =

Indian cricketer (born 1980)

Personal information
- Full name: Monica Sumra
- Born: 14 October 1980 (age 46); Nagpur, Maharashtra, India
- Batting: Right-handed
- Bowling: Right-arm leg break
- Role: Batter; occasional wicket-keeper

International information
- National side: India (2004–2006)
- Test debut (cap 68): 21 November 2005 v England
- Last Test: 8 August 2006 v England
- ODI debut (cap 77): 24 December 2004 v Australia
- Last ODI: 25 August 2006 v England
- Only T20I (cap 11): 5 August 2006 v England

Domestic team information
- Years: Team
- 2000/01: Jharkhand
- 2004/05–2006/07: Railways
- 2007/08–2008/09: Mumbai

Career statistics
Competition	WTest	WODI	WT20I	WLA
Matches	3	14	1	41
Runs scored	61	304	–	1,133
Batting average	10.16	27.63	–	35.40
100s/50s	0/0	0/3	–	2/6
Top score	29	63*	–	138*
Catches/stumpings	0/–	0/–	0/–	6/3
- Source: CricketArchive, 29 August 2022

Monica Sumra (born 14 October 1980) is an Indian former cricketer who played as a right-handed batter and occasional wicket-keeper. She appeared in three Test matches, 14 One Day Internationals and one Twenty20 International for India between 2004 and 2006. She played domestic cricket for Jharkhand, Railways and Mumbai.
