= Anjali Sharma (cricketer) =

Indian cricketer (born 1956)

Personal information
- Full name: Anjali Sharma
- Born: 12 December 1956 (age 69); New Delhi, India
- Height: 5 ft 5 in (1.65 m)
- Batting: Right-handed
- Bowling: Right-arm off-break

International information
- National side: India
- ODI debut (cap 11): 1 January 1978 v England
- Last ODI: 8 January 1978 v Australia

Career statistics
Competition	WODI
Matches	3
Runs scored	1
Batting average	0.33
100s/50s	-/-
Top score	1
Balls bowled	158
Wickets	2
Bowling average	42.50
5 wickets in innings	0
10 wickets in match	-
Best bowling	1/32
Catches/stumpings	0/-
- Source: CricketArchive, 4 May 2020

Anjali Sharma (born 12 December 1956) is a former One Day International cricketer who represented India. She played three One Day Internationals for India, all of them in January 1978, and took two wickets, with a best bowling of 1/32.

Sharma played in first class matches for Delhi State from 1975 to 1984, and was the captain for the 1983 National Tournament.

In June 2020, she was nominated to the Apex Council of the Delhi & District Cricket Association. In November 2020, she became the chair of the council's Player Welfare Committee for 2020–21.
