= Katrina Molloy =

New Zealand cricketer (born 1962)

Personal information
- Full name: Katrina Susan Molloy
- Born: 22 January 1962 (age 64); Hamilton, New Zealand
- Batting: Right-handed
- Bowling: Right-arm medium
- Role: Bowler

International information
- National side: New Zealand (1985)
- Test debut (cap 87): 7 March 1985 v India
- Last Test: 17 March 1985 v India
- ODI debut (cap 43): 10 February 1985 v Australia
- Last ODI: 24 March 1985 v India

Domestic team information
- Years: Team
- 1982/83: Auckland
- 1983/84–1986/87: North Shore

Career statistics
Competition	WTest	WODI	WFC	WLA
Matches	2	5	22	14
Runs scored	1	0	138	67
Batting average	–	0.00	11.50	9.57
100s/50s	0/0	0/0	0/0	0/1
Top score	1*	0*	35*	60
Balls bowled	352	216	1,615	763
Wickets	5	4	43	20
Bowling average	18.20	24.75	14.07	14.40
5 wickets in innings	0	0	0	1
10 wickets in match	0	0	0	0
Best bowling	2/24	2/16	4/16	5/17
Catches/stumpings	2/–	2/–	10/–	2/–
- Source: CricketArchive, 27 April 2021

Katrina Susan Molloy (born 22 January 1962) is a New Zealand former cricketer who played as a right-arm medium bowler. She appeared in 2 Test matches and 5 One Day Internationals for New Zealand in 1985. She played domestic cricket for Auckland and North Shore.
