= Varsha Raffel =

Indian cricketer (born 1975)

Personal information
- Born: 20 March 1975 (age 51); Gorakhpur, India
- Batting: Right-handed
- Bowling: Right-arm off-break

International information
- National side: India
- ODI debut (cap 76): 13 December 2004 v Australia
- Last ODI: 2 January 2006 v Pakistan

Career statistics
Competition	WODI
Matches	9
Runs scored	16
Batting average	4.00
100s/50s	0/0
Top score	7
Balls bowled	409
Wickets	11
Bowling average	20.72
5 wickets in innings	0
10 wickets in match	0
Best bowling	3/22
Catches/stumpings	0/-
- Source: CricketArchive, 8 May 2020

Varsha Raffel (born 20 March 1975) is a One Day International cricketer who represents India. She is a right hand batsman and bowls right-arm off-breaks. She has played nine ODIs, taking eleven wickets including a three-wicket haul.
