= Anjali Pendharker =

Indian cricketer (born 1959)

Personal information
- Born: 7 July 1959 (age 67); Bhir, Maharashtra, India
- Batting: Right-handed
- Bowling: Right-arm offbreak
- Role: Opening batter

International information
- National side: India
- Test debut (cap 20): 21 January 1984 v Australia
- Last Test: 17 March 1985 v New Zealand
- ODI debut (cap 18): 10 January 1982 v Australia
- Last ODI: 24 March 1985 v New Zealand

Career statistics
Competition	Test	ODI
Matches	5	19
Runs scored	218	268
Batting average	27.25	16.75
100s/50s	0/2	0/0
Top score	81	47
Balls bowled	48	12
Wickets	1	0
Bowling average	31.00	–
5 wickets in innings	0	–
10 wickets in match	0	–
Best bowling	1/22	–
Catches/stumpings	1/–	0/–
- Source: CricketArchive, 17 September 2009

Anjali Pendharker (born 7 July 1959) is a former Test and One Day International cricketer who represented India. A right-handed opener, she played five Tests and 19 ODIs for India and was given the Shri Shiv Chhatrapati Puraskar award 1983–84.

== Career ==
In her five Tests Anjali scored 218 runs with an average of 27.25 including two half centuries. With her off-breaks she took just the one wicket of New Zealand skipper, 'Debbie Hockley' but it was an essential one for the team.

== Awards ==
- Puraskar - 1983-8
