= Rajeshwari Dholakia =

Indian cricketer (born 1959)

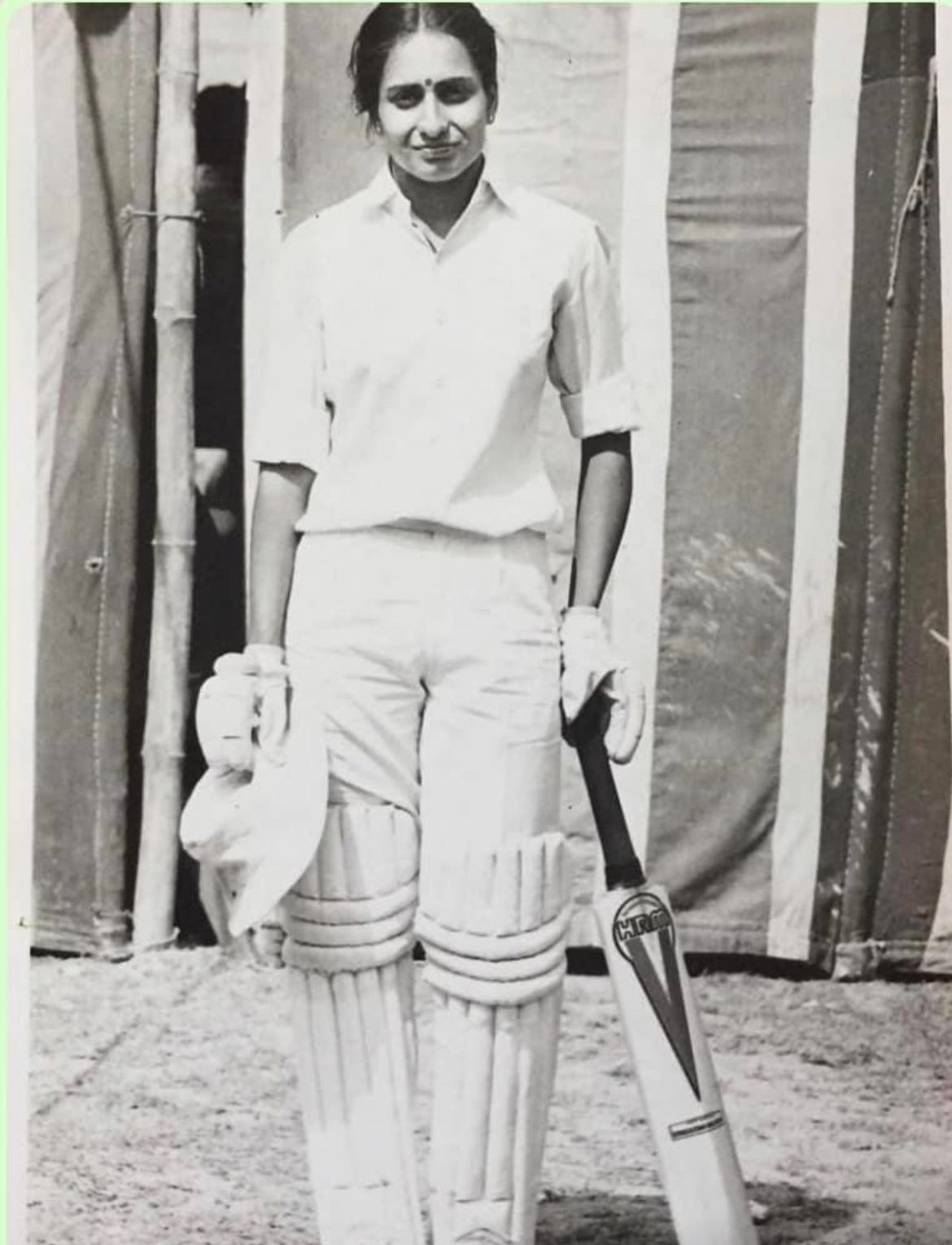
- Rajeshwari Dholakia in 1983

Personal information
- Full name: Rajeshwari Dholakia
- Born: 26 December 1959 (age 66); Mumbai, India
- Batting: Left-handed
- Bowling: Left arm orthodox
- Role: All-rounder

International information
- National side: India
- Test debut (cap 14): 21 November 1976 v West Indies
- Last Test: 15 January 1977 v Australia
- ODI debut (cap 16): 8 January 1978 v Australia
- Last ODI: 6 February 1982 v International XI

Career statistics
Competition	WTest	WODI	WLA
Matches	4	13	17
Runs scored	40	138	148
Batting average	20.00	12.54	12.33
100s/50s	0/0	0/0	0/0
Top score	24*	35	35
Balls bowled	118	–	78
Wickets	1	–	8
Bowling average	43.00	–	6.37
5 wickets in innings	0	–	0
10 wickets in match	0	–	0
Best bowling	1/10	–	3/16
Catches/stumpings	2/–	0/–	2/–
- Source: CricketArchive, 15 January 2017

Rajeshwari Dholakia Antani (born 26 December 1959) is a former Test and One Day International cricketer who represented India. A left-handed allrounder, she played four Test matches and 13 One Day Internationals for India, appearing at the 1978 and 1982 Women's Cricket World Cups.

Antani moved to the United States in the 1990s, settling in Houston, Texas. She has continued her involvement with cricket as a coach and in 2023 was named on the selection panel for the United States women's national cricket team.
