= Linda Lindsay =

New Zealand cricketer (born 1950)

Personal information
- Full name: Linda Rose Lindsay
- Born: 27 January 1959 (age 67); Wellington, New Zealand
- Batting: Right-handed
- Bowling: Right-arm fast-medium
- Role: All-rounder
- Relatives: Cheryl Henshilwood (sister)

International information
- National side: New Zealand (1978)
- ODI debut: 5 January 1978 v India
- Last ODI: 8 January 1978 v England

Domestic team information
- Years: Team
- 1970/71–1978/79: Wellington

Career statistics
Competition	WODI	WFC	WLA
Matches	2	25	5
Runs scored	27	779	53
Batting average	27.00	25.96	13.25
100s/50s	0/0	1/3	0/0
Top score	27	120	27
Balls bowled	78	636	78
Wickets	2	7	2
Bowling average	21.00	32.28	21.00
5 wickets in innings	0	0	0
10 wickets in match	0	0	0
Best bowling	2/26	2/11	2/26
Catches/stumpings	0/–	11/–	0/–
- Source: CricketArchive, 4 November 2021

Linda Rose Lindsay (née Henshilwood; born 28 February 1950) is a New Zealand former cricketer who played as a right-handed batter and right-arm pace bowler. She appeared in two One Day Internationals for New Zealand at the 1978 Women's World Cup. She played domestic cricket for Wellington.

Lindsay was born in Wellington and attended Wellington East Girls' College. Her younger sister, Cheryl Henshilwood, also played international cricket. Lindsay made her debut for Wellington during the 1970–71 season. Her international debut came at the 1978 World Cup in India. Lindsay debuted in New Zealand's second match of the tournament, against India, and took 2/26 from ten overs as her team won by nine wickets. She played her second match in New Zealand's final game, against England, and scored 27 runs from fifth in the batting order, behind only Barb Bevege among her teammates. She was less successful with the ball, however, conceding 16 runs from three overs without taking a wicket. Lindsay finished her career for Wellington after the 1978–79 season.
