= Rekha Punekar =

Indian cricketer

Personal information
- Born: India
- Batting: Right-handed

International information
- National side: India
- Test debut (cap 33): 26 June 1986 v England
- Last Test: 3 July 1986 v England
- Only ODI (cap 33): 22 June 1986 v England

Career statistics
| Competition | Test | ODI |
|---|---|---|
| Matches | 2 | 1 |
| Runs scored | 49 | – |
| Batting average | 16.33 | – |
| 100s/50s | 0/0 | – |
| Top score | 47 | – |
| Catches/stumpings | 0/– | 0/– |
- Source: CricketArchive, 28 April 2020

Rekha Punekar is a former Test and One Day International cricketer who represented India. She is a right-handed batter and played two Tests and one ODIs for India.
