= Neeta Kadam =

Indian cricketer (born 1961)

Personal information
- Full name: Neeta Kadam
- Born: 9 December 1961 (age 64); India
- Batting: Right-handed

International information
- National side: India
- Only Test (cap 30): 17 March 1985 v New Zealand
- ODI debut (cap 29): 13 March 1985 v New Zealand
- Last ODI: 24 March 1985 v New Zealand

Career statistics
Competition	Test	ODI
Matches	1	2
Runs scored	3	17
Batting average	3.00	17.00
100s/50s	0/0	0/0
Top score	3	17
Balls bowled	36	24
Wickets	0	0
Bowling average	–	–
5 wickets in innings	–	–
10 wickets in match	–	–
Best bowling	–	–
Catches/stumpings	0/-	0/-
- Source: CricketArchive, 28 April 2020

Neeta Kadam (Devanagari: नीता कदम) is a former Test and One Day International cricketer who represented India. She is a right-hand batter who played one Test and two ODIs.
