= Jyotsna Patel =

Indian cricketer

Personal information
- Born: Indore, India
- Batting: Right-handed

International information
- National side: India
- Test debut (cap 13): 7 November 1976 v West Indies
- Last Test: 12 November 1976 v West Indies

Domestic team information
- Years: Team
- 1976: Central Zone

Career statistics
Competition	Test
Matches	2
Runs scored	4
Batting average	2.00
100s/50s	0/0
Top score	2
Catches/stumpings	0/–
- Source: CricketArchive, 26 April 2020

Jyotsna Patel (also Jyotsana Patel) is a former Test cricketer who represented India. She was born in Indore, Madhya Pradesh, and played two Test matches for India.

Jyotsna's experience as a cricketer includes playing at the national level representing India against Australia, New Zealand, and the West Indies from 1974 to 1978. During that period, the stylish right-handed bats woman was also captain to Indore Madhya Pradesh State of India and Central Zone women's cricket teams. She has also represented the Indore University women's cricket team and served as captain of the Floor Hockey team for the State of Madhya Pradesh, India from 1971 to 1974.

Jyotsna Patel was recognised for a sports scholarship for the period 1972–1978 by India's government, along with a four-year Government of India merit scholarship.

Jyotsna was the coach for children and women's cricket for the Tampa Cricket League. She was also the vice-captain and player for the Tampa Sunrisers women's cricket team. Most recently, in October 2019 she has participated in a women's cricket tournament held in Boston, MA.

Ms. Patel has been honoured and recognised for her professional and recreational endeavours, by the professional organisation, 'Who's Who' in 2018–2019. She served as a member of the Happy Wanderer's Indore, M.P. India 1965–1978, and Gujarati Samaj of Tampa Bay, Florida, since 1991.

She is the lifetime member of Madhya Pradesh Cricket Association (MPCA) in Indore, India, and the Indian Cricketers’ Association (ICA) of the Board of Control for Cricket in India (BCCI).

Patel later moved to the United States. In 2023 she was appointed to the selection panel for the United States women's national cricket team.

She currently serves as a member on the USA Cricket Committee. Jyotsna Patel is working as a Senior Associate at World Financial Group, Tampa, Florida, since 2014. Jyotsna Patel sums up her life goal as -“My goal is to promote girls and women’s cricket in the world, and to be a part of it.”
