= Shobha Pandit =

Indian cricketer (born 1956)

Personal information
- Born: 11 February 1956 (age 70); Bombay, India
- Batting: Right-handed
- Bowling: Right-arm medium-fast

International information
- National side: India
- Test debut (cap 9): 31 October 1976 v West Indies
- Last Test: 15 January 1977 v Australia
- ODI debut (cap 9): 1 January 1978 v England
- Last ODI: 8 January 1978 v Australia

Career statistics
Competition	Test	ODI
Matches	8	3
Runs scored	247	42
Batting average	17.64	21.00
100s/50s	0/1	0/0
Top score	69	14
Balls bowled	184	12
Wickets	4	1
Bowling average	18.75	10.00
5 wickets in innings	0	0
10 wickets in match	0	0
Best bowling	1/4	1/10
Catches/stumpings	1/–	0/–
- Source: CricketArchive, 14 September 2009

Shobha Pandit (born 11 February 1956) is a former Test and One Day International cricketer who represented India. She also represented Maharashtra in the domestic league. She played eight Test matches and three One Day Internationals, with all three ODIs being part of the 1978 Women's Cricket World Cup.
