= Mamatha Maben =

Indian cricketer (born 1970)

Personal information
- Full name: Mamatha Maben
- Born: 15 November 1970 (age 55); Bangalore, Karnataka, India
- Batting: Right-handed
- Bowling: Right-arm medium
- Role: All-rounder

International information
- National side: India (1993–2004)
- Test debut (cap 55): 14 January 2002 v England
- Last Test: 17 November 2003 v New Zealand
- ODI debut (cap 39): 20 July 1993 v West Indies
- Last ODI: 22 December 2004 v Australia

Domestic team information
- Years: Team
- 1989/90–1990/91: Karnataka
- 1991/92–1993/94: Railways
- 1994/95–1999/00: Air India
- 2000/01–2008/09: Karnataka
- 2001/02: Railways

Career statistics
Competition	WTest	WODI	WFC	WLA
Matches	4	40	36	90
Runs scored	125	359	1,113	1,553
Batting average	31.25	17.95	39.75	37.87
100s/50s	0/1	0/1	0/8	0/7
Top score	50	53*	89*	59*
Balls bowled	54	436	1,274	946
Wickets	0	21	27	44
Bowling average	–	12.14	15.03	13.52
5 wickets in innings	0	1	2	2
10 wickets in match	0	0	1	0
Best bowling	–	6/10	5/11	6/10
Catches/stumpings	1/–	13/–	17/–	23/–
- Source: CricketArchive, 3 June 2022

Mamatha Maben (born 15 November 1970) is an Indian former cricketer who played as an all-rounder, batting right-handed and bowling right-arm medium. She appeared in four Test matches and 40 One Day Internationals for India between 1993 and 2004, including playing at the 1993 World Cup and captaining the side in 2003 and 2004. She played domestic cricket for Karnataka, Railways and Air India.

Since retiring, she has served as the head coach of the Bangladeshi and Chinese women's national sides.

She became the oldest ever woman cricketer to take a maiden five-wicket haul in an ODI, at the age of 33 years and 162 days, at the 2004 Women's Asia Cup against Sri Lanka. Her figures in that match, 6/10, are also the best WODI bowling figures for any India bowler.
