= Sreerupa Bose =

Indian cricketer

Personal information
- Full name: Sreerupa Bose
- Born: c. 1951; India
- Died: 30 November 2017 (aged 66); Kolkata, West Bengal, India

International information
- National side: India
- ODI debut (cap 27): 17 February 1985 v New Zealand
- Last ODI: 19 February 1985 v New Zealand

Career statistics
Competition	WODI
Matches	2
Runs scored	7
Batting average	7.00
100s/50s	0/0
Top score	7
Balls bowled	78
Wickets	0
Bowling average	–
5 wickets in innings	–
10 wickets in match	–
Best bowling	–
Catches/stumpings	0/–
- Source: Cricinfo, 4 May 2020

Sreerupa Bose (c. 1951 – 30 November 2017) was a One Day International cricketer who represented the Indian women's cricket team. She played two One Day Internationals. She was batsman and a bowler.

She studied at the Scottish Church College of the University of Calcutta. She was the captain of Indian women's team against England led by Virginia Wed. Later she also succeeded as sport administrator. She was appointed Joint Director at SAI Kolkata and still remembered by all her subordinates and the players and other trainers.
