= Cheryl Henshilwood =

New Zealand cricketer (born 1952)

Personal information
- Full name: Cheryl Elizabeth Henshilwood
- Born: 1 August 1952 (age 74); Wellington, New Zealand
- Batting: Right-handed
- Bowling: Right-arm off break
- Role: Batter
- Relatives: Linda Lindsay (sister)

International information
- National side: New Zealand (1977–1978)
- Only Test (cap 69): 8 January 1977 v India
- ODI debut (cap 19): 1 January 1978 v Australia
- Last ODI: 5 January 1978 v India

Domestic team information
- Years: Team
- 1970/71–1981/82: Wellington

Career statistics
| Competition | WTest | WODI | WFC | WLA |
|---|---|---|---|---|
| Matches | 1 | 2 | 42 | 12 |
| Runs scored | 48 | 15 | 1,149 | 252 |
| Batting average | 24.00 | – | 28.02 | 28.00 |
| 100s/50s | 0/0 | 0/0 | 0/6 | 0/1 |
| Top score | 41 | 15* | 79* | 55* |
| Balls bowled | 18 | – | 246 | 125 |
| Wickets | 0 | – | 6 | 6 |
| Bowling average | – | – | 16.16 | 11.50 |
| 5 wickets in innings | 0 | – | 0 | 0 |
| 10 wickets in match | 0 | – | 0 | 0 |
| Best bowling | – | – | 2/16 | 3/20 |
| Catches/stumpings | 0/– | 0/– | 20/– | 1/– |
- Source: CricketArchive, 11 November 2021

Cheryl Elizabeth Henshilwood (born 1 August 1952) is a New Zealand former cricketer who played primarily as a right-handed batter. She appeared in one Test match and two One Day Internationals for New Zealand. Her sister, Linda Lindsay, also played international cricket for New Zealand, and the two played together at the 1978 World Cup in India. She played domestic cricket for Wellington.
