= Rita Patel =

Indian cricketer (born 1970)

Personal information
- Full name: Rita Patel
- Born: 1 January 1970 (age 56); Indore, Madhya Pradesh, India
- Batting: Right-handed

International information
- National side: India
- Only ODI (cap 28): 21 February 1985 v New Zealand

Career statistics
Competition	WODI
Matches	1
Runs scored	1
Batting average	1.00
100s/50s	0/0
Top score	1
Catches/stumpings	0/-
- Source: CricketArchive, 8 May 2020

Rita Patel is a former One Day International cricketer who represented India. She was born on January 1, 1970, in Indore, Madhya Pradesh.

She played in only one match in One Day International women cricket against New Zealand in February 1985.
