= Edna Ryan (cricketer) =

New Zealand cricketer (born 1946)

Personal information
- Full name: Edna May Ryan
- Born: 8 December 1946 (age 79); Auckland, New Zealand
- Batting: Right-handed
- Role: Wicket-keeper

International information
- National side: New Zealand (1975–1982)
- Test debut (cap 67): 21 March 1975 v Australia
- Last Test: 26 January 1979 v Australia
- ODI debut (cap 22): 1 January 1978 v Australia
- Last ODI: 6 February 1982 v Australia

Domestic team information
- Years: Team
- 1965/66–1981/82: Auckland

Career statistics
Competition	WTest	WODI	WFC	WLA
Matches	5	15	67	29
Runs scored	38	17	1,587	203
Batting average	9.50	4.25	19.83	14.50
100s/50s	0/0	0/0	1/4	0/1
Top score	10	6*	154	61
Catches/stumpings	3/11	13/8	77/68	30/17
- Source: CricketArchive, 6 November 2021

Edna May Ryan (born 8 December 1946) is a New Zealand former cricketer who played as a wicket-keeper and right-handed batter. She appeared in 5 Test matches and 15 One Day Internationals for New Zealand between 1975 and 1982. She played domestic cricket for Auckland.
