= Rita Dey =

Indian cricketer

Personal information
- Born: India
- Batting: Right-handed
- Role: Wicket-keeper

International information
- National side: India
- Test debut (cap 24): 10 February 1984 v Australia
- Last Test: 17 March 1985 v New Zealand
- ODI debut (cap 22): 19 January 1984 v Australia
- Last ODI: 23 February 1995 v New Zealand

Career statistics
Competition	Test	ODI
Matches	2	6
Runs scored	84	84
Batting average	28.00	16.80
100s/50s	0/0	0/0
Top score	46	33
Catches/stumpings	2/0	3/3
- Source: CricketArchive, 27 April 2020

Rita Dey is a former Test and One Day International cricketer who represented India. She is a right hand batsman and wicket-keeper who played two Tests and six One-Day Internationals.

She is a BCCI national selector (central) and the UPCA chairperson of the women's selection committee.
