= Gargi Banerjee =

Indian cricketer

Personal information
- Born: 20 July 1961 (age 65); Calcutta, India
- Nickname: Gougo
- Batting: Right-handed
- Bowling: Right-arm medium-fast

International information
- National side: India (1978 - 1991)
- Test debut (cap 16): 21 January 1984 v Australia
- Last Test: 9 February 1991 v Australia
- ODI debut (cap 1): 1 January 1978 v England
- Last ODI: 27 July 1986 v England

Career statistics
Competition	WTest	WODI
Matches	12	26
Runs scored	614	409
Batting average	27.90	15.73
100s/50s	0/6	0/2
Top score	75	61
Balls bowled	329	291
Wickets	8	6
Bowling average	17.12	28.66
5 wickets in innings	1	0
10 wickets in match	0	0
Best bowling	6/9	2/23
Catches/stumpings	3/0	6/0
- Source: ESPNcricinfo, 17 September 2009

Gargi Banerjee (born 20 July 1961) is a former Indian cricketer who played Test and One Day International (ODI) cricket for India. She made her international debut at the age of 16 at the Eden Gardens in a match against England in the 1978 World Cup and played for West Bengal in India's domestic league prior to her international appearance.

== Early life ==
A mischievous girl and an avid sports lover, during her days at YWCA (Young Women Christian Association), she played badminton, basketball and football. A cricket novice, Gargi enrolled for the cricket trial at YWCA and got selected to join the cricket coaching camp in 1976. Her supportive family never restricted her from playing any sports. Despite cricket being considered as a gentle 'man's game’, her brother encouraged her throughout. She was drafted in to the Bengal side and in 2 years she made the jump to the national team for the 1978 World Cup.

== Career ==
She played a total of 12 Tests and 26 ODIs. and holds the record for scoring the most test runs in a career without a contributing century (614 runs). In her illustrious cricketing career, she overcame her unimpressive ODI achievements (15.73 from 26 matches over eight years) and later played her first Test, in a match where India fielded five other newcomers and Australia seven. She scored a half-century in the second innings and another one in the fourth Test of the series drawn 0-0. After two fifties, and incredible 6 for 9 in Cuttack, against New Zealand, Gargi was picked for India's first tour of England - in 1986 - where she scored 60 and 75 in the Blackpool Test. Sandhya Agarwal's century overshadowed Gargi's performance, but she made it to Australia in India's next tour in 1991.

== Accomplishments ==
Impressed by her batting, late Madhavrao Scindia offered Gargi a job contract at the cricket field. She helped to raise the bar of women's cricket in India by being associated with Indian cricket in various capacities. As the chairperson of Indian women's cricket team selection committee (2011-2014) she gave chances to budding women cricketers. Gargi felt that the more matches the youngsters played, will help them understand the difference between domestic and international circuit. In April 2017, she was bestowed with the prestigious honorary life membership of the Marylebone Cricket Club (MCC). Inspiration to young girls who are aspiring cricketers, Gargi Banerji continues to boost the morale of girls who are inclined to make cricket as a viable career option.
