= Ujwala Nikam =

Indian cricketer (born 1958)

Personal information
- Born: 19 June 1958 (age 68); Pune, India
- Batting: Right-handed
- Bowling: Right-arm off-break

International information
- National side: India
- Test debut (cap 8): 31 October 1976 v West Indies
- Last Test: 15 January 1977 v Australia
- ODI debut (cap 14): 5 January 1978 v New Zealand
- Last ODI: 8 January 1978 v Australia

Career statistics
Competition	Test	ODI
Matches	8	2
Runs scored	125	31
Batting average	10.41	15.50
100s/50s	0/0	0/0
Top score	26	31
Catches/stumpings	2/–	0/–
- Source: CricketArchive, 14 September 2009

Ujwala Nikam (born 19 June 1958) is a former Test and One Day International cricketer who represented India. She also represented Maharashtra women's cricket team in the domestic league. She played eight Test matches and two women's One Day Internationals, both in the 1978 Women's Cricket World Cup. Ujwala was born in a middle-class family. Her father was a police inspector in the city of Pune. She attended Modern High School in that city.
