= Susan Itticheria =

Indian cricketer (born 1959)

Personal information
- Full name: Susan Itticheria
- Born: kerala India
- Batting: Right-handed
- Bowling: Right-arm medium fast
- Relatives: Dipika Pallikal Karthik(daughter); Dinesh Karthik(son in law)

International information
- National side: India (1976 - 1978)
- Test debut (cap 4): 31 October 1976 v West Indies
- Last Test: 15 January 1977 v Australia
- ODI debut (cap 12): 5 January 1978 v New Zealand
- Last ODI: 8 January 1978 v Australia

Career statistics
Competition	WTest	WODI
Matches	7	2
Runs scored	40	14
Batting average	6.66	14.00
100s/50s	0/0	0/0
Top score	11	8*
Balls bowled	588	102
Wickets	7	1
Bowling average	37.40	37.00
5 wickets in innings	0	0
10 wickets in match	0	0
Best bowling	2/21	1/16
Catches/stumpings	2/0	0/0
- Source: CricketArchive, 13 September 2009

Susan Itticheria (born 1959 in Kerala, India) is a former Test and One Day International cricketer who represented India. She played seven Test matches and two One Day Internationals. Susan played in India's inaugural women's Test match, against the West Indies, in 1976.

She is the mother of Indian squash player Dipika Pallikal who is married to Indian wicket-keeper Dinesh Karthik
