= Rekha Godbole =

Indian cricketer

Personal information
- Full name: Rekha Godbole
- Born: India
- Batting: Right-handed
- Role: Batsman and wicketkeeper

International information
- National side: India
- Only Test (cap 28): 7 March 1985 v New Zealand
- ODI debut (cap 25): 25 January 1984 v Australia
- Last ODI: 21 February 1985 v New Zealand

Career statistics
Competition	Test	ODI
Matches	1	4
Runs scored	6	78
Batting average	6.00	26.00
100s/50s	0/0	0/0
Top score	6	44
Catches/stumpings	0/2	0/0
- Source: CricketArchive, 6 May 2020

Rekha Godbole is a former One Day International cricketer who represented India. She played four One Day Internationals. She scored 78 runs at an average of 26.
