= Mithu Mukherjee (cricketer) =

Indian cricketer (born 1965)

Personal information
- Born: 1965; India
- Batting: Right-handed
- Bowling: Right-arm off break

International information
- National side: India
- Test debut (cap 26): 23 February 1985 v New Zealand
- Last Test: 9 February 1991 v Australia

Career statistics
Competition	Test
Matches	4
Runs scored	76
Batting average	10.85
100s/50s	0/0
Top score	28
Balls bowled	322
Wickets	2
Bowling average	84.50
5 wickets in innings	0
10 wickets in match	0
Best bowling	1/32
Catches/stumpings	0/–
- Source: CricketArchive, 27 April 2020

Mithu Mukherjee is a former Test cricketer who represented the India national women's cricket team. She played a total of four Tests scoring a total of 76 runs and taking two wickets.
