= Rajani Venugopal =

Indian cricketer (born 1969)

Personal information
- Born: 28 May 1969 (age 57); Hyderabad, India
- Batting: Right-handed

International information
- National side: India
- Test debut (cap 29): 7 March 1985 v New Zealand
- Last Test: 10 December 1995 v England
- ODI debut (cap 31): 15 March 1985 v New Zealand
- Last ODI: 5 December 1995 v England

Career statistics
Competition	Test	ODI
Matches	6	9
Runs scored	258	92
Batting average	25.80	13.14
100s/50s	0/3	0/1
Top score	58	54
Balls bowled	66	–
Wickets	0	–
Bowling average	–	–
5 wickets in innings	–	–
10 wickets in match	–	–
Best bowling	–	–
Catches/stumpings	2/–	1/–
- Source: CricketArchive, 18 September 2009

Rajani Venugopal (born 28 May 1969) is a former Test and One Day International (ODI) cricketer who represented the India national women's cricket team. Known mainly for her batting, she played as a right-handed batter and left-arm medium-fast bowler. She played six Tests and nine ODIs for India.
