= Sandhya Mazumdar =

Indian cricketer

Personal information
- Born: Calcutta, West Bengal, India
- Batting: Right-handed

International information
- National side: India
- Test debut (cap 7): 31 October 1976 v West Indies
- Last Test: 15 January 1977 v Australia
- Only ODI (cap 8): 1 January 1978 v England

Career statistics
Competition	Test	ODI
Matches	6	1
Runs scored	84	4
Batting average	8.40	4.00
100s/50s	0/0	0/0
Top score	22	4
Catches/stumpings	2/–	0/–
- Source: CricketArchive, 26 April 2020

Sandhya Mazumdar is a former Test and One Day International cricketer who represented India. She played six Test matches and one One Day International. She made her Test debut in India's first ever women's Test match, in 1976.
