= Fowzieh Khalili =

Indian cricketer (born 1958)

Personal information
- Full name: Fowzieh Khalili
- Born: 10 October 1958 (age 68); Madras (now Chennai), India
- Batting: Right-handed
- Role: Wicketkeeper

International information
- National side: India
- Test debut (cap 8): 31 October 1976 v West Indies
- Last Test: 15 January 1977 v Australia
- ODI debut (cap 13): 1 January 1978 v England
- Last ODI: 6 February 1982 v International XI

Career statistics
Competition	Test	ODI
Matches	8	13
Runs scored	347	258
Batting average	26.69	19.84
100s/50s	0/3	0/1
Top score	84	88
Catches/stumpings	5/10	7/14
- Source: ESPNcricinfo, 25 April 2020

Fowzieh Khalili (born 10 October 1958 in Madras) is a former Test and One Day International cricketer who played as a wicket-keeper and represented India at the international level and Tamil Nadu at the domestic league level.

== Career ==
She played eight Tests and thirteen One Day Internationals. She played in India's inaugural women's Test match, in 1976. She holds the record for effecting the most dismissals as a wicket-keeper in a single Women's Cricket World Cup series (20).
