= Seema Desai =

Indian cricketer (1965–2013)

Personal information
- Full name: Seema Desai
- Born: 6 January 1965; East Singhbhum, Bihar, India
- Died: 14 June 2013 (aged 48); Ranchi, Jharkhand, India
- Batting: Right-handed
- Bowling: Right-arm medium

International information
- National side: India
- Test debut (cap 36): 2 February 1991 v Australia
- Last Test: 9 February 1991 v Australia

Domestic team information
- Years: Team
- 2006–2008: Jharkhand

Career statistics
Competition	WTest	List A
Matches	2	25
Runs scored	49	294
Batting average	12.25	21.00
100s/50s	0/0	0/1
Top score	21	69
Balls bowled	138	768
Wickets	0	24
Bowling average	–	12.45
5 wickets in innings	–	0
10 wickets in match	–	0
Best bowling	–	4/11
Catches/stumpings	0/–	3/–
- Source: CricketArchive, 15 January 2017

Seema Desai (9 January 1965 – 14 June 2013) was an Indian cricketer who played at the Test level for India. She was a right-hand batswoman and bowled medium pace. In her career spanning more than 30 years starting 1980, Desai played over 1,000 professional matches and took more than 900 wickets while scoring 14 centuries with her batting. She died in 2013 from cancer.
