= Runa Basu =

Indian cricketer (born 1955)

Personal information
- Born: 1955 (age 70–71); Calcutta, West Bengal, India
- Batting: Right-handed
- Bowling: Right-arm medium-fast

International information
- National side: India
- Test debut (cap 12): 7 November 1976 v West Indies
- Last Test: 23 February 1977 v New Zealand
- ODI debut (cap 2): 1 January 1978 v England
- Last ODI: 19 February 1984 v New Zealand

Career statistics
Competition	WTest	WODI
Matches	5	6
Runs scored	20	26
Batting average	3.33	13.00
100s/50s	0/0	0/0
Top score	5	10
Balls bowled	294	186
Wickets	2	0
Bowling average	55.00	–
5 wickets in innings	0	–
10 wickets in match	0	–
Best bowling	1/15	–
Catches/stumpings	2/–	2/–
- Source: CricketArchive, 14 September 2009

Runa Basu is a former Test and One Day International cricketer who represented India. She also represented Bengal in India's domestic league. She played five Test matches and six One Day Internationals.
