= Sharmila Chakraborty =

Indian cricketer (born 1961)

Personal information
- Born: 4 March 1961 (age 65); West Bengal, India
- Batting: Right-handed
- Bowling: Left-arm slow orthodox

International information
- National side: India
- Test debut (cap 1): 31 October 1976 v West Indies
- Last Test: 3 February 1984 v Australia
- ODI debut (cap 4): 1 January 1978 v England
- Last ODI: 19 January 1984 v Australia

Career statistics
Competition	WTest	WODI
Matches	11	14
Runs scored	35	23
Batting average	5.83	11.50
100s/50s	0/0	0/0
Top score	26	14*
Balls bowled	1196	638
Wickets	19	17
Bowling average	22.10	15.88
5 wickets in innings	1	0
10 wickets in match	0	0
Best bowling	5/25	4/11
Catches/stumpings	1/0	2/0
- Source: CricketArchive, 12 September 2009

Sharmila Chakraborty (born 4 March 1961 in West Bengal) is a former Test and One Day International cricketer who represented the India national women's cricket team. She played in India's first women's Test match, against the West Indies, in 1976, getting three wickets in the drawn match.
