= Lopamudra Bhattacharji =

Indian cricketer (born 1960)

Personal information
- Full name: Lopamudra Bhattacharji
- Born: 31 January 1960 (age 66); India

International information
- National side: India
- Only Test (cap 27): 7 March 1985 v New Zealand
- ODI debut (cap 3): 1 January 1978 v England
- Last ODI: 6 February 1982 v International XI

Career statistics
Competition	WTest	WODI
Matches	1	15
Runs scored	7	40
Batting average	7.00	4.44
100s/50s	0/0	0/0
Top score	7	14*
Balls bowled	24	480
Wickets	0	8
Bowling average	–	26.75
5 wickets in innings	–	0
10 wickets in match	–	0
Best bowling	–	3/18
Catches/stumpings	0/–	3/–
- Source: CricketArchive, 19 September 2009

Lopamudra Bhattacharji (born 31 January 1960) is a former Test and One Day International cricketer who represented the India national women's team. She played one Test and 15 ODIs for India as a medium-pace bowler.
