= Shubhangi Kulkarni =

Indian cricketer (born 1959)

Personal information
- Full name: Shubhangi Kulkarni
- Born: 19 July 1959 (age 67); Pune, Maharashtra, India
- Batting: Right-handed
- Bowling: Leg-spinner

International information
- National side: India (1976-1991)
- Test debut (cap 6): 31 October 1976 v West Indies
- Last Test: 2 February 1991 v Australia
- ODI debut (cap 13): 5 January 1978 v New Zealand
- Last ODI: 27 July 1986 v England

Career statistics
Competition	WTest	WODI
Matches	19	27
Runs scored	700	347
Batting average	23.33	13.34
100s/50s	1/2	0/0
Top score	118	44
Balls bowled	3320+	1150
Wickets	60	38
Bowling average	27.45	17.60
5 wickets in innings	5	0
10 wickets in match	0	n/a
Best bowling	6/99	4/27
Catches/stumpings	14/–	4/–
- Source: Cricinfo, 25 April 2020

Shubhangi Kulkarni (born 19 July 1959) is a former Indian cricketer and one of the game's most successful administrators. She received India's highest sporting honor, the Arjuna Award in 1985. She was the secretary of the Women's Cricket Association of India (WCAI) when WCAI was merged into BCCI in 2006.

She was a leg-spinner and a useful lower-order batter. She represented Maharashtra women's cricket team in women's domestic cricket and made her international debut in India women's cricket team's first women's cricket series against West Indies women's cricket team in 1976. She bagged a five-wicket haul in the first innings she bowled, a feat she would repeat four more times in the nineteen Tests she played in her career.

Shubhangi Kulkarni played in 27 ODIs over 5 international tours:

- 1978 Women's Cricket World Cup (2 matches)
- 1982 Women's Cricket World Cup (12 matches)
- 1983/84 Australia Women in India (4 matches)
- 1984/85 New Zealand Women in India (6 matches)
- 1986 India Women in England (3 matches)

Kulkarni captained India in three Test match (one against England and two against Australia) as well as one ODI match against England.

After retirement from Test cricket in 1991, she became a cricket administrator and was the secretary of WCAI when WCAI merged into BCCI in 2006. Currently, she part of ICC Women's Cricket Committee representing Asian Cricket Council.
