= Sudha Shah =

Indian cricketer (born 1958)

Personal information
- Full name: Sudha Shah
- Born: 22 June 1958 (age 68); Kannur, India
- Batting: Right-handed
- Bowling: Right-arm off-break

International information
- National side: India (1976-1991)
- Test debut (cap 11): 31 October 1976 v West Indies
- Last Test: 9 February 1991 v Australia
- ODI debut (cap 15): 5 January 1978 v New Zealand
- Last ODI: 27 July 1986 v England

Career statistics
Competition	Test	ODI
Matches	21	13
Runs scored	601	293
Batting average	18.78	24.41
100s/50s	0/1	0/1
Top score	62*	53
Balls bowled	842	270
Wickets	5	2
Bowling average	64.20	78.00
5 wickets in innings	0	0
10 wickets in match	0	0
Best bowling	3/28	1/7
Catches/stumpings	21/0	2/0
- Source: CricketArchive, 14 September 2009

Sudha Shah (born 22 June 1958) is a former Test and One Day International cricketer who represented India. She also represented Tamil Nadu and South Zone in India's domestic competitions. She played a total of 13 One Day Internationals and 21 Tests, including India's first ever women's Test match, in 1976.

In June 2018, she was awarded with the Lifetime Achievement Award by the Board of Control for Cricket in India (BCCI).
