= Diana Edulji =

Indian cricketer (born 1956)

Diana Eduji
Personal information
- Full name: Diana Edulji
- Born: 26 January 1956 (age 70); Bombay, India
- Batting: Right-handed
- Bowling: Slow left arm orthodox
- Role: All-rounder

International information
- National side: India
- Test debut (cap 3): 31 October 1976 v West Indies
- Last Test: 19 February 1991 v Australia
- ODI debut (cap 5): 1 January 1978 v England
- Last ODI: 29 July 1993 v Denmark

Career statistics
Competition	WTest	WODI
Matches	20	34
Runs scored	404	211
Batting average	16.16	8.79
100s/50s	0/1	0/0
Top score	57*	25
Balls bowled	5098	1961
Wickets	63	46
Bowling average	25.77	16.84
5 wickets in innings	1	0
10 wickets in match	0	n/a
Best bowling	6/64	4/12
Catches/stumpings	8/–	9/–
- Source: ESPNcricinfo, 25 April 2020

Diana Edulji (born 26 January 1956) is an Indian former cricketer. Born in Bombay into a Parsi family, she was drawn to sports at an early age. She grew up playing cricket with a tennis ball in the railway colony where she lived. She then went on to play basketball and table tennis at the junior national level, before switching to cricket. At a cricket camp hosted by former Test cricketer Lala Amarnath, she honed her skills. Women's cricket was becoming more popular in India at the time. Diana went on to play for the Railways and then the Indian national cricket team where she was a successful slow left-arm orthodox bowler. She played her first series in 1975. In 1978 she was made the captain of the team. She remains the third highest wicket-taker in Tests.

In 1986 Edulji was refused entry to the Lord's Pavilion while captaining India on their tour of England. She quipped that the MCC (Marylebone Cricket Club) should change its name to MCP ("male chauvinist pigs").

Unofficially, Edulji became the first bowler to take 100 Women's 'Test wickets', but some of these Tests were later deemed unofficial. As per the official record, she took 63 Women's Test wickets, which is the highest by an Indian player, and the third highest of all time, after Mary Duggan and Betty Wilson. She holds the record for delivering the most balls by any woman cricketer in Women's Test history (5098+). She finished with 120 international wickets, which was the highest by a women's cricketer at the time of her retirement.

Diana received India's then greatest sports honour, the Arjuna Award in 1983. The Government of India awarded her the civilian honour of Padma Shri in 2002. In the same year, she was felicitated by Castrol for her contribution to Indian women's cricket. She was the first Indian women's cricketer to be awarded a benefit match. She was appointed in BCCI administration panel by the Supreme Court of India on 30 January 2017. She became the first woman to be appointed to the BCCI selection panel. In 2023, she was inducted into the ICC Cricket Hall of Fame.
