= India women's cricket team in England in 1986 =

Indian women's cricket team in England in 1986
	India	England
- Dates: 11 June – 27 July 1986
Captains	Shubhangi Kulkarni (1st WTest, 1st WODI); Diana Edulji (2nd, 3rd WTests; 3rd WODI); Purnima Rau (2nd WODI)	Carole Hodges; Karen Smithies (2nd WODI)

Test series
- Result: 3-match series drawn 0–0
Most runs	Sandhya Agarwal (359)	Carole Hodges (318)
Most wickets	Shashi Gupta (8)	Gillian McConway (13)

One Day International series
- Results: England won the 3-match series 3–0
Most runs	Sandhya Agarwal (115)	Jacqueline Court (112)
Most wickets	Arunadhati Ghosh (5)	Gillian McConway (6)

The Indian women's cricket team toured England in month June–July of Season 1986. The tour included a series of 3 Women's Test matches and a series of 3 Women's One Day Internationals. Team India also played 16 tour matches against domestic teams. England women won the ODI series 3-0 and the Test series ended in a draw 0-0.

== Squads ==
WTests		WODIs	
England	India	England	India
Jan Brittin	Sandhya Agarwal	Jan Brittin	Sandhya Agarwal
Lesley Cooke	Gargi Banerji	Lesley Cooke	Gargi Banerji
Jacqueline Court	Minoti Desai	Jacqueline Court	Minoti Desai
Carole Hodges	Diana Edulji	Carole Hodges	Diana Edulji
Joan Lee	Arunadhati Ghosh	Gillian McConway	Arunadhati Ghosh
Gillian McConway	Shashi Gupta	Sarah Potter	Shashi Gupta
Julie May	Venkatacher Kalpana	Jane Powell	Venkatacher Kalpana
Susan Metcalfe	Shubhangi Kulkarni	Gillian Smith	Shubhangi Kulkarni
Sarah Potter	Rekha Punekar	Karen Smithies	Rekha Punekar
Jane Powell	Shantha Rangaswamy	Avril Starling	Shantha Rangaswamy
Gillian Smith	Sudha Shah	Amanda Stinson	Sudha Shah
Avril Starling	Manimala Singhal	Helen Stother	Manimala Singhal
Amanda Stinson	Sujata Sridhar	Janet Tedstone	Sujata Sridhar
Helen Stother	Rajani Venugopal		

== WODI series ==
=== First WODI ===
22 June 1986
Scorecard

India; 190/6 (48 Overs)	v	England; 191/5 (46.2/Overs)
Sandhya Agarwal 72; Avril Starling 2/28 (8 overs)		Jacqueline Court 67; Shashi Gupta 2/20 (10.2 overs)

England Women won by 5 wickets
Grace Road, Leicester
Umpires: Sally Marshall and John West

- England Women won the toss and elected to field.
- The match was reduced before play started to 48 overs per side.
- Lesley Cooke, Gillian Smith and Amanda Stinson (Eng); and Minoti Desai and Rekha Punekar (Ind) made their WODI debuts.

=== Second WODI ===
26 July 1986
Scorecard

India; 65 (33.2 overs)	v	England; 68/4 (34 overs)
Sandhya Agarwal 20; Sarah Potter 3/11 (9 overs)		Carole Hodges 25; Shashi Gupta 1/4 (6 overs)

England Women won by 6 wickets
Thornbury Avenue, Osterley
Umpires: Sheila Hill and Sheila Keen

- England Women won the toss and elected to field.
- 55 overs per side match.
- Karen Smithies (Eng) and Venkatacher Kalpana (Ind) made their WODI debuts.

=== Third WODI ===
27 July 1986
Scorecard

England; 140/9 (37 overs)	v	India; 99 (36.3 overs)
Jacqueline Court 32; Arunadhati Ghosh 4/17 (4 overs)		Sandhya Agarwal 23; Gillian McConway 3/21 (8 overs)

England Women won by 41 runs
Recreation Ground, Banstead
Umpires: Sheila Hill and Sally Marshall

- India Women won the toss and elected to field.
- The match was reduced before play started to 37 overs per side.

== Women's Test series ==
=== First Women's Test ===
26–30 June 1986
Scorecard

India	v	England
323 (135 overs); Shubhangi Kulkarni 118; Avril Starling 4/61 (30 overs)		198 (100.3 overs); Sarah Potter 86; Shantha Rangaswamy 4/42 (29.3 overs)
128 (69.3 overs); Venkatacher Kalpana 34; Avril Starling 3/36 (21 overs)		229/5 (61 overs); Lesley Cooke 117; Shantha Rangaswamy 2/72 (18 overs)

Match drawn
Harewood Road, Collingham
Umpires: June Bragger (Eng) and John West (Eng)

- India Women won the toss and elected to bat.
- Lesley Cooke, Julie May, Gillian Smith and Amanda Stinson (Eng); and Minoti Desai, Venkatacher Kalpana, Rekha Punekar and Manimala Singhal (Ind) made their Women's Test debuts.
- 29 June was a rest day

=== Second Women's Test ===
3–7 July 1986
Scorecard

India	v	England
426/9d (175.2 overs); Sandhya Agarwal 132; Gillian McConway 2/38 (34.2 overs)		350/6d (132 overs); Jane Powell 115*; Diana Edulji 3/92 (44 overs)
176/2d (70 overs); Gargi Banerji 75; Sarah Potter 1/18 (8 overs)		54/2 (31 overs); Carole Hodges 25; Diana Edulji 1/5 (6 overs)

Match drawn
Stanley Park, Blackpool
Umpires: Valerie Gibbens (Eng) and Veronica Reichwald (Eng)

- India Women won the toss and elected to bat.
- Joan Lee (Eng) made her Women's Test debut.
- 6 July was a rest day

=== Third Women's Test ===
12–15 July 1986
Scorecard

England	v	India
332/7d (105 overs); Jan Brittin 125; Diana Edulji 4/94 (42 overs)		374 (168.4 overs); Sandhya Agarwal 190; Gillian McConway 7/34 (42 overs)
253/7d (121 overs); Sarah Potter 102; Shashi Gupta 3/50 (22 overs)		54/1 (19 overs); Sandhya Agarwal 24*; Avril Starling 1/17 (7 overs)

Match drawn
New Road, Worcester
Umpires: Janet Burns and Ann Garton

- England Women won the toss and elected to bat.
- Sandhya Agarwal (Ind) broke the record for the highest individual score in Women's Tests (190).
