= Australia women's cricket team in India in 1983–84 =

	India	Australia
- Dates: 19 January – 23 February 1984
Captains	Shantha Rangaswamy	Jill Kennare

Test series
- Result: 4-match series drawn 0–0
Most runs	Sandhya Agarwal (288)	Peta Verco (367)
Most wickets	Diana Edulji (16)	Lyn Fullston (20)

One Day International series
- Results: Australia won the 4-match series 4–0
Most runs	Gargi Banerjee (83)	Trish Dawson (182)
Most wickets	Shashi Gupta (5); Diana Edulji (5)	Denise Martin (6)

The Australia women's national cricket team toured India in January and February 1984. They played against India in four Test matches and four One Day Internationals, with the Test series ending as a 0–0 draw and Australia winning the ODI series 4–0.

== Squads ==
India	Australia
Shantha Rangaswamy (c); Sandhya Agarwal; Gargi Banerjee; Runa Basu; Vrinda Bhagat; Sandra Braganza; Sharmila Chakraborty; Rita Dey; Diana Edulji; Arunadhati Ghosh; Rekha Godbole; Shashi Gupta; Nilima Jogalekar (wk); Shubhangi Kulkarni; Anjali Pendharker; Sudha Shah; Sujata Sridhar	Jill Kennare (c); Trish Dawson (wk); Annette Fellows; Lyn Fullston; Glenda Hall; Jen Jacobs; Lyn Larsen; Denise Martin; Christina Matthews (wk); Wendy Piltz; Karen Price; Karen Read; Lindsay Reeler; Peta Verco

== WODI Series ==
=== 1st ODI ===
19 January 1984
Scorecard

India; 162/8 (50 overs)	v	Australia; 164/7 (48.2 overs)
Shubhangi Kulkarni 44 (–); Denise Martin 3/34 (10 overs)		Lindsay Reeler 60 (–); Arunadhati Ghosh 3/28 (10 overs)

Australia Women won by 3 wickets
Country Golf Club Ground, Faridabad
Player of the match: Lindsay Reeler (Aus)

- Australia Women won the toss and elected to field.
- Trish Dawson, Annette Fellows, Christina Matthews, Wendy Piltz, Lindsay Reeler (Aus), Rita Dey, Arunadhati Ghosh and Shashi Gupta (Ind) all made their WODI debuts.

=== 2nd ODI ===
25 January 1984
Scorecard

Australia; 133/9 (50 overs)	v	India; 106 (44 overs)
Annette Fellows 35* (65); Shashi Gupta 3/19 (7 overs)		Rita Dey 33 (91); Karen Price 2/14 (7 overs)

Australia Women won by 27 runs
Sawai Mansingh Stadium, Jaipur
Player of the match: Rita Dey (Ind)

- Australia Women won the toss and elected to bat.
- Glenda Hall (Aus) and Rekha Godbole (Ind) both made their WODI debuts.

=== 3rd ODI ===
8 February 1984
Scorecard

India; 194/9 (50 overs)	v	Australia; 196/5 (49.2 overs)
Sudha Shah 53 (67); Karen Price 2/40 (10 overs)		Lindsay Reeler 47 (71); Diana Edulji 2/21 (9.2 overs)

Australia Women won by 5 wickets
Nehru Stadium, Pune

- India Women won the toss and elected to bat.
- Lyn Larsen (Aus) made her WODI debut.

=== 4th ODI ===
23 February 1984
Scorecard

India; 219/6 (50 overs)	v	Australia; 220/4 (43.4 overs)
Sandhya Agarwal 64 (–); Lyn Fullston 2/31 (10 overs)		Trish Dawson 77* (–); Gargi Banerjee 1/22 (4 overs)

Australia Women won by 6 wickets
M. A. Chidambaram Stadium, Madras
Player of the match: Trish Dawson (Aus)

- India Women won the toss and elected to bat.
- Sandhya Agarwal (Ind) made her WODI debut.

== WTest Series ==
=== 1st Test ===
21 – 23 January 1984
Scorecard

India	v	Australia
185 (81.1 overs); Shubhangi Kulkarni 42 (–); Karen Price 4/52 (22 overs)		263 (87.3 overs); Peta Verco 81 (–); Diana Edulji 6/64 (25.3 overs)
240/9d (112 overs); Gargi Banerjee 63 (–); Lyn Fullston 3/41 (27 overs)		19/1 (9 overs); Karen Read 12* (–); Sujata Sridhar 1/9 (4 overs)

Match drawn
Feroz Shah Kotla Stadium, Delhi
Umpires: Rajan Mehra (Ind) and Swaroop Kishen (Ind)
Player of the match: Diana Edulji (Ind)

- India Women won the toss and elected to bat.
- Trish Dawson, Lyn Fullston, Lyn Larsen, Christina Matthews, Denise Martin, Karen Read, Lindsay Reeler (Aus), Gargi Banerjee, Vrinda Bhagat, Shashi Gupta, Nilima Jogalekar, Anjali Pendharker and Sujata Sridhar (Ind) made their WTest debuts.

=== 2nd Test ===
28 – 30 January 1984
Scorecard

Australia	v	India
245/9d (96 overs); Peta Verco 67 (–); Shashi Gupta 4/47 (21 overs)		198 (107.2 overs); Shashi Gupta 48* (–); Karen Price 6/72 (34 overs)
123/8d (59 overs); Lindsay Reeler 34 (–); Shashi Gupta 4/53 (28 overs)		65/7 (44 overs); Shashi Gupta 25* (–); Karen Price 4/35 (17 overs)

Match drawn
K. D. Singh Babu Stadium, Lucknow
Umpires: Raman Sharma (Ind) and TD Mukherjee (Ind)
Player of the match: Shashi Gupta (Ind)

- Australia Women won the toss and elected to bat.
- Annette Fellows (Aus) made her WTest debut.

=== 3rd Test ===
3 – 5 February 1984
Scorecard

India	v	Australia
343 (149.5 overs); Sandhya Agarwal 71 (–); Denise Martin 3/42 (17.5 overs)		525 (156.1 overs); Jill Kennare 131 (–); Shubhangi Kulkarni 3/133 (39 overs)
50/0 (8 overs); Arunadhati Ghosh 30* (–)

Match drawn
Sardar Vallabhbhai Patel Stadium, Ahmedabad
Umpires: Jaduvendrasinh Jadeja (Ind) and Sanjay (Ind)
Player of the match: Jill Kennare (Aus)

- India Women won the toss and elected to bat.
- Glenda Hall, Wendy Piltz (Aus), Sandhya Agarwal and Arunadhati Ghosh (Ind) all made their WTest debuts.

=== 4th Test ===
10 – 13 February 1984
Scorecard

India	v	Australia
340 (191.5 overs); Sandhya Agarwal 134 (–); Lyn Fullston 4/80 (67.5 overs)		358/8d (129 overs); Jill Kennare 99 (–); Shubhangi Kulkarni 5/124 (45 overs)
235/7d (102 overs); Sandhya Agarwal 83 (–); Jen Jacobs 4/72 (30 overs)		139/6 (28 overs); Karen Price 32 (–); Diana Edulji 2/33 (9 overs)

Match drawn
Wankhede Stadium, Bombay
Umpires: G.K. Raman (Ind) and M. R. Singh (Ind)
Player of the match: Jill Kennare (Aus)

- India Women won the toss and elected to bat.
- Rita Dey (Ind) made her WTest debut.
