= List of India women's national cricket team statistics =

The India women's national cricket team, also known as Women in Blue, represents India in women's international cricket. It is governed by the Board of Control for Cricket in India and is a full member of the International Cricket Council with Women's Test, Women's One Day International, and Women's Twenty20 International status.

== Listing criteria ==
In general the top five are listed in each category (except when there is a tie for the last place among the five, when all the tied record holders are noted).

== Listing notation ==
Team notation

- (200–3) indicates that a team scored 200 runs for three wickets and the innings was closed, either due to a successful run chase or if no playing time remained
- (200) indicated that a team scored 200 runs and was all out

Batting notation

- (100) indicates that a batsman scored 100 runs and was out
- (100*) indicates that a batsman scored 100 runs and was not out

Bowling notation

- (5–20) indicates that a bowler has captured 5 wickets while conceding 20 runs

Currently playing

- † indicates a current cricketer

Start date

- indicates the date the match starts

== Test matches ==
=== Team records ===
==== Highest totals ====
Score	Opponent	Venue	Date
603/6d	South Africa	M. A. Chidambaram Stadium, Chennai, India	28 June 2024
467	England	County Ground, Taunton, England	14 August 2002
428	England	DY Patil Stadium, Navi Mumbai, India	14 December 2023
426/9d	England	Stanley Park Stadium, Liverpool, England	3 July 1986
406	Australia	Wankhede Stadium, Mumbai, India	21 December 2023
Last updated: 1 July 2024

=== Batting records ===
==== Most runs ====
Runs	Player	Matches	Innings	Period
1,110	Sandhya Agarwal	13	23	1984-1995
750	Shantha Rangaswamy	16	26	1976-1991
700	Shubhangi Kulkarni	19	32	1976–1991
699	Mithali Raj	12	19	2002–2021
629	Smriti Mandhana	7	12	2014–present
Last updated: 1 July 2024

==== Highest scores ====
Runs	Player	Opposition	Venue	Date
214	Mithali Raj	England	County Ground, Taunton, England	14 August 2002
205	Shafali Verma	South Africa	M. A. Chidambaram Stadium, Chennai, India	28 June 2024
192	Thirush Kamini	South Africa	Srikantadatta Narasimha Raja Wadeyar Ground, Mysore, India	16 November 2014
190	Sandhya Agarwal	England	New Road county ground, Worcester, England	12 July 1986
149	Smriti Mandhana	South Africa	M. A. Chidambaram Stadium, Chennai, India	28 June 2024
Last Updated: 1 July 2024
