= Alexander Ferrauti =

German sport scientist

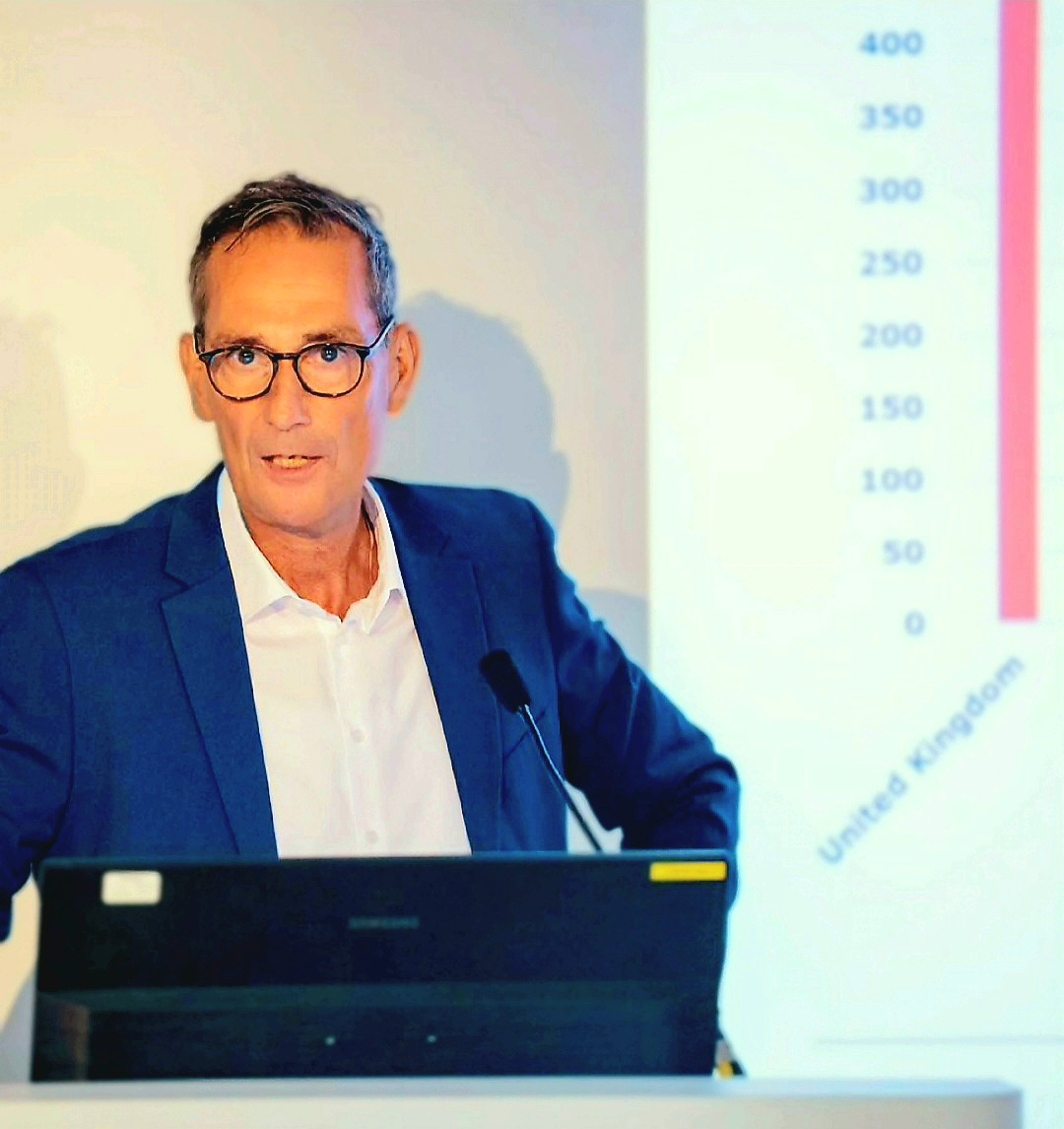
Ferrauti delivering a presentation in April 2025.

Alexander Ferrauti is a German sport scientist, university professor and past president of the European College of Sport Science (ECSS).

== Education ==
Ferrauti graduated in Sport Science and Biology at the German Sport University Cologne and at the University of Cologne. He completed his PhD in 1992 and completed his Post-Doc Thesis in 1997 on "Energy metabolism in tennis with practical recommendations for high-performance and recreational sports."

== Career ==
Since 2002, Ferrauti is a full Professor for Sports Science at Ruhr University Bochum teaching Training & Exercise Science and will be Emeritus from 2026. His research topics are related to physiological aspects in team and racket sports, performance testing training prescription and sports nutrition for different age groups on recreational and competitive level. He is editor of several textbooks. Ferrauti served as Faculty Dean from 2013 to 2017 and was a member of the Senate at Ruhr University Bochum. He was Scientific Consultant for the German Tennis Federation and holds an A-level Coaching license. After being Congress President of the 22nd Annual Congress of the European College of Sport Science (ECCS) in 2017, he was elected to the ECSS Executive Board (2019) and was ECSS President (2023-2025) and ECSS Past President (2025-2027).
