= Wendy Piltz =

Australian cricketer

Personal information
- Full name: Wendy Piltz
- Born: 24 August 1956 (age 70); Adelaide, Australia
- Batting: Right-handed
- Bowling: Right-arm medium
- Role: Bowler

International information
- National side: Australia (1984)
- Only Test (cap 103): 3 February 1984 v India
- ODI debut (cap 37): 19 January 1984 v India
- Last ODI: 23 February 1984 v India

Domestic team information
- Years: Team
- 1981/82–1985/86: South Australia

Career statistics
Competition	WTest	WODI	WFC	WLA
Matches	1	3	14	13
Runs scored	8	0	147	133
Batting average	8.00	0.00	13.36	11.08
100s/50s	0/0	0/0	0/0	0/0
Top score	8	0	36	28
Balls bowled	108	180	1,584	538
Wickets	1	0	20	8
Bowling average	43.00	–	17.75	26.12
5 wickets in innings	0	0	1	0
10 wickets in match	0	0	0	0
Best bowling	1/43	–	5/26	3/13
Catches/stumpings	1/–	1/–	5/–	2/–
- Source: CricketArchive, 19 January 2023

Wendy Piltz (born 24 August 1956) is a former Australian cricketer who played as a right-arm medium bowler. She appeared in one Test match and three One Day Internationals (ODIs) for Australia in 1984, all against India. She played domestic cricket for South Australia.

After her cricket career, she became a physical educator and author.

== Sporting career ==
Piltz represented Australia and South Australia in lacrosse and cricket during the 1980s and 1990s. Her international cricket career included one Test and three ODIs for Australia in a tour of India in early 1984. She also played for South Australia during the 1980s. She has been involved in basketball and netball at the district level.

== Education career ==
Piltz received a Diploma of Teaching from the Adelaide College of Advanced Education in 1976 and a Bachelor of Education in Physical education in 1977. She completed a Master of Science at the University of Oregon in 1980. She taught health and physical education in State and Catholic primary and secondary schools.

Piltz joined the University of South Australia in 1989. As of 2024, she teaches in the Human Movement program and in Bachelor of Education programs working in health and physical education. Her teaching focuses on pedagogy in health and physical education, group dynamics and Choice Theory. She co-authored "Play Practice" with Alan Launder.

Piltz has worked with organizations including the Australian Sports Commission, State Offices of Sport and Recreation, SA Department of Education, Training and Employment, Catholic Education Office, the Australian Football League, Women's Lacrosse Australia, Australian Touch Association, SA National Football League, and Human Kinetics in the American Sport Education Program. In 2011, she presented at an Association Internationale des Écoles Supérieures d'Éducation Physique conference session on sport pedagogy.

== Selected bibliography ==
- Piltz, W. (2003). Teaching and coaching using a play practice approach. In Teaching games for understanding in physical education and sport. (pp. 180–200). Vermont, USA: National Association for Sport and Physical Education Publications.
- Piltz, W. (2002). Case study 3 Lacrosse coaching. In Making mentors: A guide to establishing a successful mentoring program for coaches and officials (pp. 71–80). Canberra: Australian Sports Commission.
- Garrett, R. & Piltz, W. (1999). A case study of curriculum control: Curriculum reform in health and physical education. In B. Johnson & A. Reid, Contesting the curriculum (pp. 201–209). Katoomba: Social Science Press.
- Garrett, R, Wrench, A & Piltz, W. (2007). Lab School as a teaching strategy in physical education teacher education, Healthy Lifestyles Journal, (54)(2), 19–24.
- Launder, A & Piltz, W. ( 2006). Beyond 'understanding' to skilful play in games, through play practice, Journal of Physical Education New Zealand, (39)(1), pp 47–57.
- Piltz, W. & Kemp, T. (1995). Teaching personal responsibility through group adventure initiative tasks. Journal of Adventure Education and Outdoor Leadership, 12(2), 23–26.
- Santomier, J., Howard, W., Piltz, W., & Romance, T. (1980). White sock crime: Organizational deviance in inter collegiate athletics. Journal of Sport and Social Issues, 4(2), 26–32.
- Piltz, W 2008, The influence of play practice principles and processes on pre-service teachers' conceptions & capabilities in games teaching. Paper presented at the Association Internationale des Ecoles Superieures d’Education Physique (AIESEP) World Congress, Sapporo, Japan, 21–24 Jan 2008 (in press).
- Piltz, W 2008, Improving group skills, personal responsibility and team building using an interactive on line learning object. Paper presented at the Association Internationale des Ecoles Superieures d’Education Physique (AIESEP) World Congress, Sapporo, Japan, 21–24 Jan 2008 (in press).
- Piltz, W 2007, Teaching Lacrosse using games based Play Practice principles. Paper presented at the Asia-Pacific Conference on Teaching Sport and Physical Education for Understanding, Sydney, 14 – 15 Dec 2006. pp 84–99.
- Piltz, W 2007, Influencing professional practice in games education through working models and principle based experiential learning, Paper presented at the Asia-Pacific Conference on Teaching Sport and Physical Education for Understanding, Sydney, 14 – 15 Dec 2006. pp 100–112.
- Piltz, W. (2004). Reading the Game: A key component of effective instruction in teaching and coaching. In 2nd International Conference: Teaching games and Sport for Understanding. pp 79–89.
- Piltz, W. (2002). Teaching and coaching using a play practice approach. Paper presented at the Teaching Games for Understanding Conference, New Hampshire, 1–4 August 2001.
- Piltz, W. (2002). Applying choice theory and reflection to enhance student outcomes in group dynamics. Paper presented at the 22nd Biennial National ACHPER Conference—Interaction for Healthy Solutions, Launceston, 3–6 July 2002. Launceston: Australian Council for Health, Physical Education and Recreation.
- Piltz, W. (2002). Developing competent and confident game players using a play practice methodology. Paper presented at the 22nd Biennial National ACHPER Conference—Interaction for Healthy Solutions, Launceston, 3–6 July 2002. Launceston: Australian Council for Health, Physical Education and Recreation.
- Piltz, W. (2002). Beyond technical or tactical—A critique of current approaches to the teaching of games: Proceedings of the 22nd Biennial National ACHPER Conference—Interaction for Healthy Solutions, Launceston, 3–6 July 2002. Launceston: Australian Council for Health, Physical Education and Recreation.
- Piltz, W. (1998). Engaging reluctant and resistant learners: Proceedings of the 21st Biennal National ACHPER Conference—Key into life, Adelaide, 12–16 January 1998 (pp. 107–109). Adelaide: Australian Council for Health, Physical Education and Recreation.
- Piltz, W. (1998). Promoting responsibility and group effectiveness: Proceedings of the 21st Biennal National ACHPER Conference—Key into life, Adelaide, 12–16 January 1998 (pp. 110–113). Adelaide: Australian Council for Health, Physical Education and Recreation.
- Piltz, W. & Garrett, R. (1998). Preparing teachers in health and physical education into the 21st century: Proceedings of the 21st Biennal National ACHPER Conference—Key into life, Adelaide, 12–16 January 1998 (pp. 114–117). Adelaide: Australian Council for Health, Physical Education and Recreation.
- Garrett, R. & Piltz, W. (1998). Curriculum reform and its impact on professional practice and identity in health and physical education (abstract). AARE conference papers on disc retrieved on 16 June 2002.
- Launder, A. & Piltz, W. (1999). Becoming a better bench coach: Coaching in the game. Sports Coach, 22(1), 24–25.
- Launder, A. & Piltz, W. (1999). Becoming a better bench coach: Match analysis. Sports Coach, 21(4), 26–27.
- Piltz, W. (1999). Making sense of chaos. The Sport Educator, 11(3), 21–24.
- Piltz, W. (1999). When can we play a game? The advantages of a play practice approach for the teaching of games. ACHPER Matters (T3), 8–12.
- Piltz, W. (1998). Teaching games effectively. ACHPER Pick up and Run: 50 Ideas for Health and Physical Education, 12–14.
- Piltz, W. (1996). The name of the game is lacrosse. Aussie Sport Action, 7(2), 36–39.
- Piltz, W. (1994, May). Stepping into the 21st century. The Lacrosse Player, 5.
- Piltz, W. (1994, June). Lacrosse at the crossroads. The Lacrosse Player, 13–15.
- Launder, A. & Piltz, W. (1992, January). An innovative approach to the teaching of touch. Sportscoach, 12–17.
- Piltz, W. (1983, July). Face the fear. Time Out, South Australian Lacrosse Association, 6–7.
- Launder, A. & Piltz, W. (1996). Coach education towards 2000—The lacrosse experience; Proceedings of the National Coaching and Officiating Conference—Participation to performance, Brisbane, 30 November – 3 December 1996 (pp. 25–29), Australian Coaching Council.
- Piltz, W. (1994). Applying the A.I.M. model of coach education to lacrosse: Proceedings of the National Coaching Conference—Doing it better, Canberra, 1–3 December 1994 (pp. 153–157), Australian Coaching Council.
- Launder, A., Piltz, W., & Launder, D. (1994). It's only work if your would rather be doing something else: Proceedings of the National Coaching Conference—Doing it better, Canberra, 1–3 December 1994 (pp. 93–97), Australian Coaching Council.
- Piltz, W. (1992). Head injury and protection in women's lacrosse in Australia. Australian Sports Commission.
- Piltz, W. (1987). The optional use of protective headgear in women's lacrosse south Australia: A case study 1983–1987. Unpublished report, South Australian Women's Lacrosse Board.
