= Joan Lee =

Joan Lee may refer to:

- Joan Boocock Lee (1922–2017), British-American model and voice actress and wife of Stan Lee
- Joan Lee (cricketer) (born 1952), English cricketer
