= Julie Mayer =

Julie Mayer may refer to:

- Julie Mayer (Desperate Housewives), a character from the U.S. television series Desperate Housewives
- Julie Mayer (tennis), South African tennis player
- Julie Mayer (broadcaster), former BBC radio presenter

== See also ==
- Julie Meyer, American born entrepreneur and inventor
- Julie May (born 1964), English cricketer
