= Michael Bar-Eli =

Israeli psychologist

- מיכאל בר-אלי
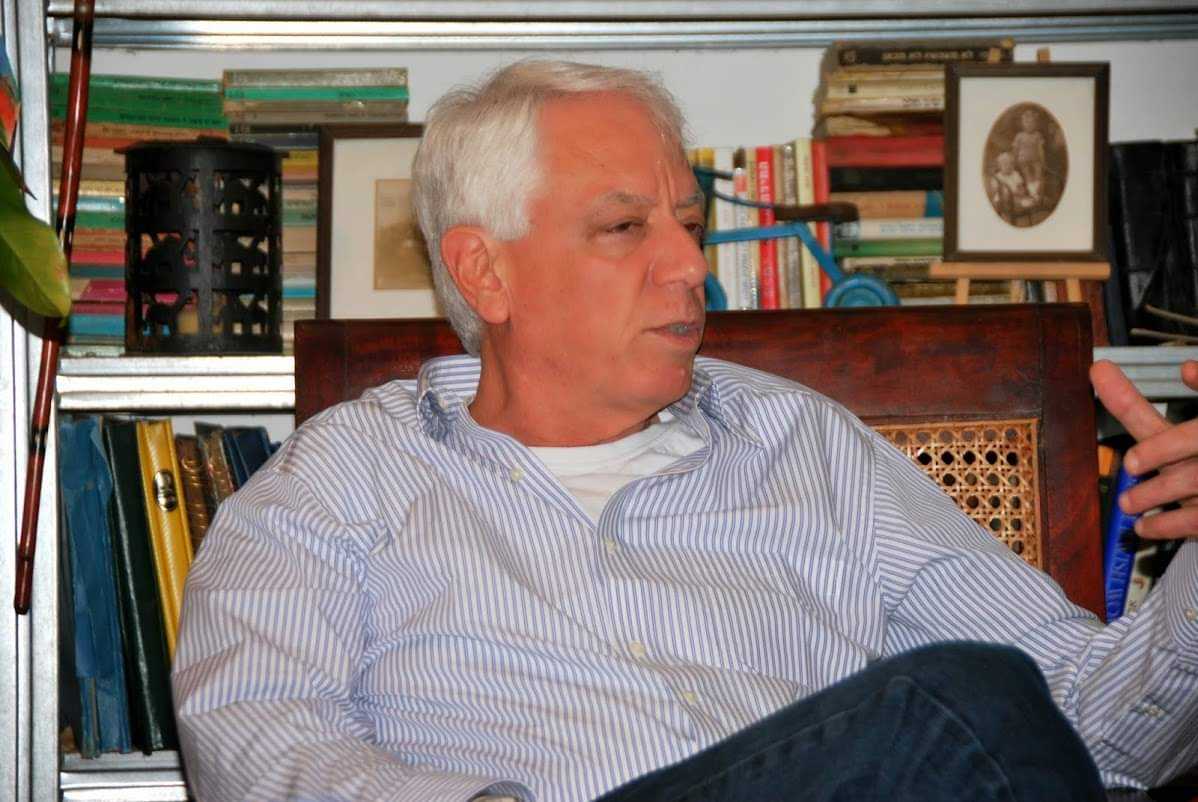
- Born: January 23, 1953 (age 73); Israel
- Education: Hebrew University of Jerusalem German Sport University Cologne
- Occupation: Professor
- Organization: Ben-Gurion University of the Negev

Michael "Miki" Bar-Eli (Hebrew: מיכאל בר-אלי; born January 23, 1953) is an Israeli psychologist, Emeritus Professor who held the Nat Holman Chair in Sports Research at the Faculty of Business and Management, Ben-Gurion University of the Negev, Beer-Sheva.

== Biography ==
Bar-Eli was born in 1953, attended Mitrani High School, and graduated with a major in Mathematics-Physics. His compulsory military service in the IDF was spent as a soldier in a Hawk anti-aircraft missile battery. After his discharge from the IDF he earned a B.A. in Behavioral Sciences (Psychology and Sociology) at Ben-Gurion University, an M.A. in Psychology (Social and Organizational) at the Hebrew University in Jerusalem, and his Doctorate in Sport Psychology and Sociology at the German Sport University in Cologne. Upon his return to Israel, he joined the army as a military psychologist at the rank of Major. After completing two stints, he worked in sport psychology in the Research and Sports Medicine Division of the Wingate Institute, serving as Director of the Behavioral Sciences Department. In 1995 he was appointed Associate Professor in the Faculty of Business and Management at Ben-Gurion University; in 2003, he was promoted to Full Professor. He served in 2015-2018 as Chair of the Business Administration Department and i also serves as Chair of the Supreme Academic Council and head of the Sports Management studies at the Academic College at Wingate.

Bar-Eli served as psychologist for basketball teams such as Maccabi Tel Aviv, and for Israel's National Teams in basketball and water-polo, and premier league soccer teams. in 2018-2022, he has been the head psychologist the Israel Basketball Association; in 2019-2022, he also was the head of performance psychology education and development in the Israel Football (Soccer) Association.

== Research ==
Bar-Eli first published mainly on the subject of his doctoral dissertation, the diagnosis of psychological performance crises in sports competitions. In the early 1990s, Bar-Eli turned to study goal-setting as a means of improving performance, a subject that was developing rapidly at that time in sport psychology. During the 1990s, he was among those researching and developing the "Wingate five-step approach to mental preparation," based in part on the principle of biofeedback.

Following his 1995 appointment at the newly established Business Administration Department of the Ben-Gurion University, he began to deal more intensively with psychological issues relevant to the area of management, such as judgment and decision making, risk taking and behavioral economics. In his works he handled these issues in various contexts, among them sports, physical education, adapted physical activity, consumer behavior, the military and the police. He also focused on questions pertaining to the rationality (or the lack thereof) in decision-making processes, paradoxical behavior, creativity and innovation, and dealt with them from psychological, psycho-philosophical and economic viewpoints.

== Other professional activity ==
1989-1997 President of the Israel Society for Sport Psychology and Sociology.

1989 Founding member of the Asian-South Pacific Association of Sport Psychology (ASPASP), in which he served as Senior Vice President until 2011.

1991-2001 Israel’s representative in the European Federation of Sport Psychology (FEPSAC), including 4 years as managing council member and chair of the federation's scientific committee

2012/13 – Mercator Professor, Eberhard-Karls-University, Tuebingen, Germany

2014-2017 – Distinguished Invited Professor, Ruprecht-Karls University, Heidelberg, Germany

== Books and publications ==
English: Bar-Eli has published about 220 peer-reviewed articles in scientific journals mainly in the fields of sport psychology and management, but also in other fields of the behavioral sciences and their application in management. He wrote (with co-authors) two books: The first, on judgment, decision making and success in sport, was published in 2011 by Wiley, and the second, on the application of the theory of complex systems in sport, was published in 2013 by Routledge. He also was the sole author for a science-based trade book entitled “BOOST!”, which deals with applications of sport psychology in management and work. It was published by Oxford University Press in 2018 and has been translated into several languages. He participated in co-authoring of two textbooks in hebrew, "The Psychology of Sport and Physical Activity (Parts 1 & 2), and "Statistics for Physical Education and Sport" - both of them unique in their field in Israel.
