= Alan Lee (cricket writer) =

Cricket writer (1954–2015)

Alan Lee (1954 – 19 December 2015) was a prolific British writer and author on cricket and horse racing.

He was the cricket correspondent at The Times from 1988 to 1999, and from 1999, the horse-racing correspondent. He authored many books on cricket, including biographies, co-written with the subjects, of David Lloyd, David Gower and Tony Greig. In the field of racing, he wrote a 2002 biography of the jockey Richard Johnson.

In 2001, Lee won the SJA Sports Writer of the Year and the Racing Journalist of the Year awards. He was named the Racing Journalist of the Year again in 2003. He headed London Times' cricket coverage from 1988 to 1999 between the stints of two of the biggest names in cricket journalism in the second half of 20th century : John Woodcock was Times' Cricket Correspondent from 1954 to 1988, and Christopher Martin-Jenkins from 1999 to 2008.

Lee underwent heart surgery on 6 November 2015 and was expected to make a full recovery. He attended Ascot on 18 December where he was reportedly in "sparkling form", but he died unexpectedly the following day, aged 61. His long-term partner was the cricketer and writer Sarah Potter.
