= German Sport University Cologne =

Sport university

Coordinates: 50°56′12.149″N 6°52′9.63″E

Deutsche Sporthochschule Köln
- German Sport University Cologne
- Type: university
- Established: 1947
- Rector: Univ.-Prof. Dr. Heiko Strueder
- Faculty: 703; December 2019
- Administrative staff: 312; August 2019
- Students: 5.966
- Location: Cologne, NRW, Germany
- Campus: Müngersdorf
- Website: www.dshs-koeln.de

The German Sport University Cologne (Deutsche Sporthochschule Köln, DSHS) is a public university located in Cologne, North Rhine-Westphalia, Germany. Founded in 1947, it is the only higher education institution in Germany focused exclusively on sport and exercise sciences. The university developed from the Deutsche Hochschule für Leibesübungen, which was originally established in Berlin in 1920. It was re-established in Cologne after World War II and gained university status in 1970.

The university offers degree programs at the bachelor's, master's, and doctoral levels, as well as teacher training qualifications. Its campus is situated in the Müngersdorf district and includes extensive sport and research facilities. As of recent figures, the institution enrolls around 6,000 students.

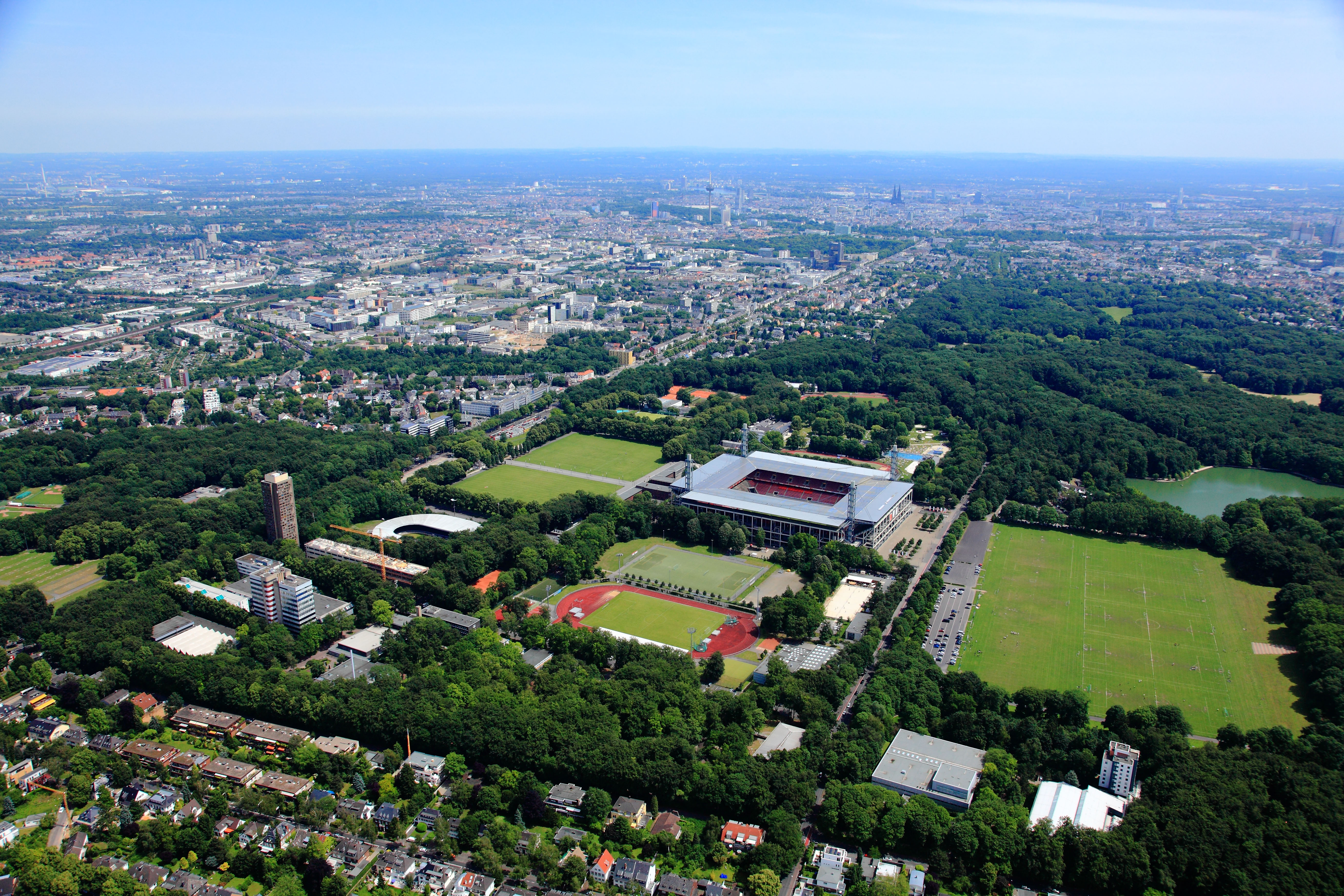
Aeration of the German Sport University Cologne

== History ==
The Sport University Cologne (Deutsche Sporthochschule, Köln) was founded in 1947. In 1962, it was one of the founding members of Association Internationale des Écoles Supérieures d'Éducation Physique.

== Facilities ==
The German Sport University Cologne is located in the Müngersdorf district of Cologne, adjacent to the city’s sports park and the RheinEnergieStadion. The campus covers approximately 187,000 square meters, of which around 61,000 square meters are used for sports facilities.

In addition to sports infrastructure, the university includes academic buildings, laboratories, and 19 scientific institutes. The Central Library of Sport Sciences (Zentralbibliothek der Sportwissenschaften), located on campus, holds one of the largest collections of literature in the field of sport and exercise science.

== Study ==
The German Sport University Cologne offers degree programs in the field of sport and exercise sciences. The university provides undergraduate and graduate qualifications, including teacher training degrees. Programs are structured in accordance with the German higher education framework.

=== Undergraduate Programs ===
The university offers the following bachelor's degree programs:

- B.A. Sport Management and Sport Communication
- B.Sc. Sport and Performance
- B.A. Sport Journalism
- B.A. Sport and Health in Prevention and Therapy
- B.A. Sport and Movement Mediation in Leisure and Recreational Sports

These programs generally require six semesters of full-time study and include theoretical coursework alongside practical components.

=== Graduate Programs ===
Master’s degree programs at the university include:

- M.Sc. Exercise Science and Coaching
- M.Sc. Sport Management
- M.Sc. Psychology in Sport and Exercise
- M.Sc. Human Technology in Sports and Medicine
- M.A. International Sport Development and Politics
- M.Sc. Rehabilitation, Prevention and Health Management
- M.Ed. Physical Education (teaching degree)

Most master’s programs require four semesters of study. Admission typically requires a relevant undergraduate degree and additional criteria depending on the program.

Courses are primarily taught in German, though some master's programs are offered partly or entirely in English.

== Research ==
The German Sport University Cologne conducts research across various disciplines related to sport and exercise sciences. The university comprises 19 scientific institutes and several affiliated centers, focusing on areas such as biomechanics, physiology, psychology, sociology, pedagogy, and sport management. Research activities encompass both basic and applied studies, addressing topics like health, performance, education, and social aspects of sport. Notable research centers include the Centre for Integrative Physiology in Space (ZiP), the German Research Centre for Elite Sport (momentum), and the Centre for Preventive Doping Research. The university also hosts a WADA-accredited anti-doping laboratory.

== Rankings ==
University rankings

By subject – Global & National
ARWU Sport Science 2020	17	1

CHE Ranking 2020 – National
Sports Sciences
Overall study situation	● 2.2
Support in the study entry phase	● 8/14 pts.
Contact with work environment	–
Publications per professor	● 31.4

In the Shanghai Ranking's 2020 Global Ranking of Sport Science Schools and Departments, the German Sport University Cologne is ranked 17th in the world and 1st in Germany.

== See also ==
- European College of Sport Science
