= Gillian McConway =

English cricketer (born 1950)

Personal information
- Full name: Gillian Elizabeth McConway
- Born: 8 May 1950 (age 76); Wanganui, New Zealand
- Batting: Right-handed
- Bowling: Slow left-arm orthodox
- Role: Bowler

International information
- National sides: International XI (1982); England (1984–1987)
- Test debut (cap 91): 6 July 1984; England v New Zealand
- Last Test: 29 August 1987; England v Australia
- ODI debut (cap 21/35): 12 January 1982; International XI v New Zealand
- Last ODI: 25 July 1987; England v Australia

Domestic team information
- Years: Team
- 1969/70–1971/72: Wellington
- 1972/73–1973/74: Otago
- 1975–1981: Surrey
- 1982–1989: East Anglia

Career statistics
Competition	WTest	WODI	WFC	WLA
Matches	14	23	33	44
Runs scored	106	65	280	171
Batting average	9.63	5.00	8.48	7.12
100s/50s	0/0	0/0	0/0	0/0
Top score	28*	11*	28*	36*
Balls bowled	3,826	1,098	5,388	2,114
Wickets	40	15	83	50
Bowling average	25.47	39.33	20.48	19.10
5 wickets in innings	2	0	3	1
10 wickets in match	0	0	1	0
Best bowling	7/34	3/12	7/34	6/4
Catches/stumpings	8/–	4/–	20/–	10/–
- Source: CricketArchive, 26 February 2021

Gillian Elizabeth McConway (born 8 May 1950) is a former cricketer who played as a slow left-arm orthodox bowler. Born in New Zealand but settled in England, she appeared in 14 Test matches and 11 One Day Internationals for England between 1984 and 1987. She also played 12 matches for International XI at the 1982 World Cup. She played domestic cricket for Wellington and Otago in New Zealand, and for Surrey and East Anglia in England.

== Early life ==
McConway was born in Wanganui, New Zealand. As a "tiny tot", she would watch her father, John, playing cricket in their family's backyard with other children from the neighbourhood. She would also run out, still in nappies, to have a bat.

When McConway was seven years old, the family moved to Oamaru, and her father joined Union Cricket Club. Through him, she learned much about cricket. On one memorable occasion, when the club hosted a game against player's partners, she stood in for her mother. Despite having to wear batting pads that were far too big for her, she scored more than 100 runs against a team including some of North Otago's greats.

At 15, McConway moved to Wellington, where she played secondary school and senior representative cricket as a left arm spin bowler and right-handed batter. At 21, she relocated to Dunedin for work. There, a colleague introduced her to Bill Boock, who helped train her and his son, Stephen, a future Black Cap. McConway later credited Bill Boock for the "final shaping of my cricket". They played in a churchyard on a Sunday, and there he taught her "... to groove my action, and line and length."

== Domestic career ==
In New Zealand, McConway played domestic cricket for Wellington and later Otago. In February 1973, she moved to England. She was immediately selected for Surrey, where she played the "equivalent of three seasons of cricket in one". Later, she played for East Anglia.

In 1988, playing for East Anglia in the Women's Area Championship against Yorkshire at Cambridge, McConway bowled what she described that year as "the finest 11 overs I have bowled. Of 66 deliveries all but one went exactly where I intended it, and all were against batsmen of Test quality." She also took one wicket for eight runs in those 11 overs. In her final county match, for East Anglia the following year, she bowled 11 overs and took one wicket for one run.

== International career ==
In 1982, McConway played 12 ODI matches for International XI at the 1982 World Cup. By 1984, she was qualified to play for England through her grandparents, and because she had lived in England for at least seven years. Her Test debut for England that year was against the country of her birth. She appeared for England in 14 Test matches and 11 ODIs between 1984 and 1987.

In an ODI against Australia at Canterbury in 1987, McConway played the unusual role for a spinner of opening the bowling, in what turned out to be England's only win that year against the touring team. However, she was not selected for the following year's World Cup in Australia.

In Tests, McConway took 40 wickets at an average of 25.47. One of her most memorable performances was in the second Test against Australia at Adelaide in December 1984. In an England victory by just five runs, she finished with seven wickets for the match. In July 1986, she achieved her best Test bowling figures, of 42-27-34-7, in the first innings of the third Test against India at Worcester.

In 2019, she was belatedly presented with a cap as England's 91st Test cricketer and 35th ODI player.

== Administration career ==
In the 1980s, McConway was manager of a leisure centre in Boreham Wood, Hertfordshire. In the 1990s, she was an England team selector.

Between 2000 and 2007, McConway served as the executive director of the England and Wales Cricket Board. In 2005, she was a member of the first International Cricket Council (ICC) women's development committee, following the ICC's merger that year with the International Women's Cricket Council.

== Personal life ==
In England, McConway enjoyed gardening, "... and home decorating my Olde Worlde Cottage, something that you can't find in New Zealand." In 2007, she moved back to New Zealand, where she settled in Ōtaki. She took up golf, always attends Wellington cricket matches, and visits Oamaru at least once a year.
