= Glenda Hall =

Australian cricketer (born 1964)

Personal information
- Full name: Glenda Joy Hall
- Born: 5 May 1964 (age 62); Brisbane, Australia
- Batting: Right-handed
- Bowling: Right-arm leg break
- Role: All-rounder

International information
- National side: Australia (1984–1988)
- Test debut (cap 104): 3 February 1984 v India
- Last Test: 10 February 1984 v India
- ODI debut (cap 39): 25 January 1984 v India
- Last ODI: 25 January 1988 v New Zealand

Domestic team information
- Years: Team
- 1979/80–1994/95: Australian Capital Territory
- 1996/97: Queensland

Career statistics
Competition	WTest	WODI	WFC	WLA
Matches	2	2	30	38
Runs scored	17	0	552	514
Batting average	8.50	0.00	17.25	14.68
100s/50s	0/0	0/0	0/2	0/2
Top score	12	0	92	65*
Balls bowled	282	36	3,192	1,937
Wickets	1	0	48	44
Bowling average	134.00	–	23.33	19.93
5 wickets in innings	0	0	2	1
10 wickets in match	0	0	0	0
Best bowling	1/41	–	5/26	5/10
Catches/stumpings	1/–	1/–	13/–	14/–
- Source: CricketArchive, 18 January 2023

Glenda Joy Hall (born 5 May 1964) is an Australian former cricketer who played as an all-rounder, bowling right-arm leg break and batting right-handed. She appeared in two Test matches and two One Day Internationals for Australia between 1984 and 1988. She played domestic cricket for Australian Capital Territory and Queensland.

In 1985, Hall was a member of an Australian Board President's XI along with players including Marie Cornish, Tina Macpherson, Karen Brown and Trish Dawson that played against a Women's Cricket Association XI selected by Audrey Collins.

On 5 April 2019, Hall was one of the first six inductees into the Cricket ACT Hall of Fame. The other five were Peter Solway, Michael Bevan, Bronwyn Calver, Lorne Lees and Greg Irvine.
