= Sandhya Agarwal =

Indian cricketer

Personal information
- Full name: Sandhya Agarwal
- Born: 9 May 1963 (age 63); Indore, Madhya Pradesh, India
- Batting: Right-handed
- Bowling: Right-arm offbreak
- Role: All Rounder

International information
- National side: India (1984 - 1995)
- Test debut (cap 22): 3 February 1984 v Australia
- Last Test: 17 November 1994 v England
- ODI debut (cap 26): 23 February 1984 v Australia
- Last ODI: 14 November 1995 v England

Domestic team information
- Years: Team
- Railways

Career statistics
Competition	WTest	WODI
Matches	13	21
Runs scored	1,110	567
Batting average	50.45	31.05
100s/50s	4/4	0/4
Top score	190	72
Balls bowled	24	–
Wickets	1	–
Bowling average	20.00	–
5 wickets in innings	0	–
10 wickets in match	0	–
Best bowling	1/–	–
Catches/stumpings	2/–	4/–
- Source: ESPNcricinfo, 11 January 2013

Sandhya Agarwal (born 9 May 1963) is an Indian former cricketer and former captain of the India women's cricket team. She hails from Indore in Madhya Pradesh.

== Career ==
She played in 13 Test matches from 1984 to 1995, scoring 1,110 runs at a batting average of 50.45, including 4 centuries. She made her top score of 190 against England in 1986, beating Betty Snowball's score of 189 that had held the record in women's Test cricket since 1935. However, her record was surpassed by Denise Annetts, who scored 193 in 1987.

Agarwal also played in 21 Women's ODIs, scoring 567 runs at an average of 31.50.

Her major teams included Indian women's cricket team and the Railways women's cricket team.

== International centuries ==
Test centuries
No.	Runs	Opponents	City/Country	Venue	Year
1	134	Australia	Bombay, India	Wankhede Stadium	1984
2	106	New Zealand	Cuttack, India	Barabati Stadium	1985
3	132	England	Blackpool, England	Stanley Park	1986
4	190	England	Worcester, England	New Road	1986

== Post-retirement ==
After her retirement, Agarwal continued to contribute to cricket as a selector and coach. She is chairperson of girl's U-19 and senior women's team of MPCA as well as a member of the BCCI's women's committee.

In 2017, Agarwal was offered honorary life membership by the Marylebone Cricket Club in recognition of her distinguished service to cricket.

== See also ==
- List of centuries in women's Test cricket
