= Sarah Potter =

English cricketer (born 1961)

Personal information
- Full name: Sarah Potter
- Born: 11 July 1961 (age 65); Hammersmith, Middlesex, England
- Bowling: Left-arm fast
- Role: All-rounder
- Relatives: Dennis Potter (Father)

International information
- National side: England (1984–1987)
- Test debut (cap 94): 27 July 1984 v New Zealand
- Last Test: 29 August 1987 v Australia
- ODI debut (cap 36): 24 June 1984 v New Zealand
- Last ODI: 25 July 1987 v Australia

Domestic team information
- Years: Team
- 1979–1988: West

Career statistics
Competition	WTest	WODI	WFC	WLA
Matches	7	8	14	26
Runs scored	360	58	552	292
Batting average	32.72	9.66	25.09	15.36
100s/50s	1/1	0/0	1/2	0/2
Top score	102	30	102	67
Balls bowled	957	408	2,152	1,310
Wickets	8	10	22	35
Bowling average	48.00	23.50	41.50	18.74
5 wickets in innings	0	0	1	0
10 wickets in match	0	0	0	0
Best bowling	3/52	3/11	6/59	3/7
Catches/stumpings	1/–	1/–	1/–	10/–
- Source: CricketArchive, 25 February 2021

Sarah Potter (born 11 July 1961) is a British former cricketer who played as a left-arm bowler and a middle-order batter. She played seven Test matches and eight One-Day Internationals for England between 1984 and 1987. She scored one Test century, an innings of 102 against India at Worcester in 1986. She played domestic cricket for West of England.

She is the daughter of the dramatist Dennis Potter. She was her father's secretary, and head of the Whistling Gypsy production company for TV dramas, most of which were written by her father. She wrote a novelisation of his TV play Brimstone and Treacle, published by Quartet Books in 1982. She has also written on women's cricket for The Times. She was in a long-term relationship with sports journalist Alan Lee, who died in 2015.
