= International cricket in 1986 =

International cricket season

The 1986 International cricket season was from May 1986 to September 1986.

== Season overview ==
International tours
Start date	Home team	Away team	Results [Matches]			
Start date	Home team	Away team	Test	ODI	FC	LA
24 May 1986	England	India	0–2 [3]	1–1 [2]	—	—
16 July 1986	England	New Zealand	0–1 [3]	1–1 [2]	—	—

== May ==
=== India in England ===
ODI series
No.	Date	Home captain	Away captain	Venue	Result
ODI 386	24 May	David Gower	Kapil Dev	Kennington Oval, London	India by 9 wickets
ODI 387	26 May	David Gower	Kapil Dev	Old Trafford, Manchester	England by 5 wickets
Test series
No.	Date	Home captain	Away captain	Venue	Result
Test 1046	5–10 June	David Gower	Kapil Dev	Lord's, London	India by 5 wickets
Test 1047	19–23 June	Mike Gatting	Kapil Dev	Headingley, Leeds	India by 279 runs
Test 1048	3–8 July	Mike Gatting	Kapil Dev	Edgbaston, Birmingham	Match drawn

== July ==
=== New Zealand in England ===
ODI series
No.	Date	Home captain	Away captain	Venue	Result
ODI 388	16 July	Mike Gatting	Jeremy Coney	Headingley, Leeds	New Zealand by 47 runs
ODI 389	18 July	Mike Gatting	Jeremy Coney	Old Trafford, Manchester	England by 6 wickets
Test series
No.	Date	Home captain	Away captain	Venue	Result
Test 1049	24–29 July	Mike Gatting	Jeremy Coney	Headingley, Leeds	Match drawn
Test 1050	7–12 August	Mike Gatting	Jeremy Coney	Trent Bridge, Nottingham	New Zealand by 8 wickets
Test 1051	21–26 August	Mike Gatting	Jeremy Coney	The Oval, London	Match drawn
