= Women's lacrosse in Australia =

- Lacrosse pictogram
- Country: Australia
- National team: Australia women's national lacrosse team

While not being urged to avoid competition, women had few opportunities to compete in sport in Australia until the 1880s. After that point, new sporting facilities were being built around the country and many new sport clubs were created. During the 1900s in Australia, lacrosse became more socially acceptable for women to participate in. Subsequently, female participation rates rose in places like Queensland.

In 1922, a committee in Australia investigated the benefits of physical education for girls. They came up with several recommendations regarding what sports were and were not appropriate for girls to play based on the level of fitness required. It was determined that for medical reasons, some girls should probably not be allowed to participate in tennis, netball, lacrosse, golf, hockey, and cricket. Soccer was completely medically inappropriate for girls to play. Sports which were medically appropriate for all girls, so long as they were not done in an overly competitive manner, were swimming, rowing, cycling and horseback riding.

Australian women's sports had an advantage over many other women's sport organisations around the world in the period after World War II. Women's sport organisations had largely remained intact and had held competitions during the war. This structure survived in the post-war period. Women's sports were not hurt because of food rationing, petrol rationing, population disbursement, and other issues facing post-war Europe.

== See also ==
- Lacrosse in Australia
- Netball in Australia
- Women's lacrosse
- Women's cricket in Australia
- Women's association football in Australia
- Women's field hockey in Australia

== Bibliography ==
- Evening Post (19 December 1922). "Women in Print". Evening Post. Vol. CC, no. 147. New Zealand: National Library of New Zealand. p. 7.
- Howell, Max; Howell, Reet; Brown, David W. (1989). The Sporting Image, A pictorial history of Queenslanders at play. Brisbane: University of Queensland Press. ISBN 0-7022-2206-2.
- Stell, Marion K. (1991). Half the Race, A history of Australian women in sport. North Ryde, Australia: HarperCollins. ISBN 0-207-16971-3.
