= Amanda Stinson =

English cricketer (born 1965)

Personal information
- Full name: Amanda Stinson
- Born: 17 November 1965 (age 60); Sheffield, Yorkshire, England
- Role: Wicket-keeper

International information
- National side: England (1986–1987)
- Test debut (cap 101): 26 June 1986 v India
- Last Test: 29 August 1987 v Australia
- ODI debut (cap 42): 22 June 1986 v India
- Last ODI: 25 July 198 v Australia

Domestic team information
- Years: Team
- 1987–1988: Yorkshire

Career statistics
Competition	WTest	WODI	WLA
Matches	4	5	12
Runs scored	18	1	15
Batting average	6.00	–	7.50
100s/50s	0/0	0/0	0/0
Top score	7	1*	7*
Catches/stumpings	8/3	3/1	8/1
- Source: CricketArchive, 21 February 2021

Amanda Stinson (born 17 November 1965) is an English cricketer and former member of the England women's cricket team who played as a wicket-keeper. She played four test matches and five one day internationals, in 1986 and 1987. She played domestic cricket for Yorkshire.
