= Lesley Cooke =

English cricketer (born 1963)

Personal information
- Full name: Lesley Cooke
- Born: 28 November 1963 (age 62); Brighton, Sussex, England
- Nickname: cookie
- Batting: Left-handed
- Role: Batter

International information
- National side: England (1986)
- Test debut (cap 98): 26 June 1986 v India
- Last Test: 12 July 1986 v India
- ODI debut (cap 40): 22 June 1986 v India
- Last ODI: 27 July 1986 v India

Domestic team information
- Years: Team
- 1981–1989: Sussex

Career statistics
Competition	WTest	WODI	WFC	WLA
Matches	3	3	4	15
Runs scored	290	49	394	274
Batting average	48.33	16.33	56.28	18.26
100s/50s	1/2	0/0	1/3	0/1
Top score	117	24	117	73
Balls bowled	0	0	0	210
Wickets	–	–	–	2
Bowling average	–	–	–	59.00
5 wickets in innings	–	–	–	0
10 wickets in match	–	–	–	0
Best bowling	–	–	–	1/22
Catches/stumpings	0/–	0/–	0/–	1/–
- Source: CricketArchive, 23 February 2021

Lesley Cooke (born 28 November 1963) is an English cricketer and former member of the England women's cricket team. She played three Test matches against India in 1986, scoring 72 and 117 as an opening batsman on her debut at Wetherby. Only the second Englishwoman to score a century on her Test debut. She also appeared in three One Day Internationals against India in the same year. Cooke played domestic cricket for Sussex.
