= Peta Verco =

Australian cricketer

Personal information
- Full name: Peta Verco
- Born: 2 March 1956 (age 70); Moora, Western Australia
- Batting: Right-handed
- Bowling: Right-arm off break Right-arm medium
- Role: All-rounder

International information
- National side: Australia (1977–1985)
- Test debut (cap 87): 15 January 1977 v India
- Last Test: 25 January 1985 v England
- ODI debut (cap 24): 1 January 1978 v New Zealand
- Last ODI: 2 February 1985 v England

Domestic team information
- Years: Team
- 1974/75–1984/85: Western Australia

Career statistics
Competition	WTest	WODI	WFC	WLA
Matches	13	20	37	39
Runs scored	765	300	1,516	828
Batting average	40.26	20.00	38.87	25.87
100s/50s	1/4	0/2	2/7	0/5
Top score	105	52	105	74*
Balls bowled	2,057	817	4,180	2,100
Wickets	21	9	49	31
Bowling average	23.42	36.55	24.32	24.06
5 wickets in innings	0	0	0	0
10 wickets in match	0	0	0	0
Best bowling	3/20	3/9	3/11	4/20
Catches/stumpings	12/–	2/–	16/–	3/–
- Source: CricketArchive, 10 November 2023

Peta Verco (née Cook; born 2 March 1956) is an Australian former cricketer who played as a right-handed left-handed batter who could bowl right-arm off break and right-arm medium. She appeared in 13 Test matches and 20 One Day Internationals for Australia between 1977 and 1985. She played domestic cricket for Western Australia.

Verco scored one Test century, 105 against India in 1984.
