= Venkatacher Kalpana =

Indian cricketer (born 1961)

Personal information
- Born: 18 July 1961 (age 65); Karnataka, India
- Batting: Right-handed
- Role: Wicket-keeper

International information
- National side: India
- Test debut (cap 32): 26 June 1986 v England
- Last Test: 9 February 1991 v Australia
- ODI debut (cap 34): 26 July 1986 v West Indies
- Last ODI: 29 July 1993 v Denmark

Career statistics
Competition	WTest	WODI
Matches	3	8
Runs scored	71	69
Batting average	14.20	9.85
100s/50s	0/0	0/0
Top score	34	31
Catches/stumpings	1/3	6/10
- Source: CricketArchive, 18 September 2009

Venkatacher Kalpana (born 18 July 1961) is a former Test and One Day International (ODI) cricketer who represented India. She is a right hand batsman and wicket-keeper. She has played three Tests and eight ODIs. She holds, jointly with Sarah Illingworth, the record for effecting the most dismissals as wicket-keeper in an innings of a Women's Cricket World Cup match.
