= Arunadhati Santosh Ghosh =

Indian cricketer (born 1960)

Arunadhati Ghosh
Personal information
- Born: India
- Batting: Right-handed
- Bowling: Right-arm offbreak

International information
- National side: India
- Test debut (cap 23): 3 February 1984 v Australia
- Last Test: 12 July 1986 v England
- ODI debut (cap 23): 19 January 1984 v Australia
- Last ODI: 27 July 1986 v England

Career statistics
Competition	WTest	WODI
Matches	8	11
Runs scored	134	108
Batting average	13.40	15.42
100s/50s	0/0	0/0
Top score	41	45*
Balls bowled	816	318
Wickets	5	9
Bowling average	67.60	20.88
5 wickets in innings	0	0
10 wickets in match	0	0
Best bowling	2/26	4/17
Catches/stumpings	3/–	2/–
- Source: CricketArchive, 17 September 2009

Arunadhati Ghosh (born 1960) is an Indian former Test and One Day International cricketer who represented the national team. She played a total of eight Tests and 11 ODIs.
