= European College of Sport Science =

- Abbreviation: ECSS
- Formation: January 2, 1995; 31 years ago
- Legal status: Non-profit-organisation
- Purpose: sport science
- Location: Am Sportpark Müngersdorf 6, 50933 Cologne, Germany
- Official language: English, German
- President: Janice Thompson
- Website: sport-science.org

The European College of Sport Science (ECSS) is a non-profit organisation dedicated to the promotion and application of multi-, and interdisciplinary science in sport, exercise, physical activity, and health. It was founded in 1995 in Nice, France. Currently, the ECSS office is based in Cologne, Germany.

The ECSS cooperation with corresponding non-European associations and sport scientists.

== Membership ==
The ECSS offers individual membership. It holds an annual congress and members include, among others, researchers, academics, scientists, lecturers, coaches and physiotherapists from all areas of sport science, such as Applied Sport Science, Biomechanics & Motor control, Physiology & Nutrition, Psychology, Social Sciences & Humanities and Sport & Exercise Medicine and Health.

== Structure ==
As a non-profit organisation, the association has a charter, which gives detailed information on the name, domicile, status, purpose, tasks and more. Executive bodies, which perform their tasks on an honorary basis, are the General Assembly, the Executive Board (which elects and appoints the President), the President and the Directorate. The current President is Janice Thompson.

== Annual congresses ==
An annual congress has been organised since 1996. The Congress comprises a range of invited symposia and multi-, inter-, and mono-disciplinary sessions.

== EJSS ==
The European Journal of Sport Science (EJSS) is a peer-reviewed academic Medline- and Impact Factor-listed journal of the European College of Sport Science that focuses on the field of sport science. It provides a platform for researchers, academics, and professionals to publish their original research, review articles, and other scholarly contributions related to various aspects of sport and exercise science.
