= Trish Dawson =

Australian cricketer

Personal information
- Full name: Patricia Carmel Dawson
- Born: 9 July 1959 (age 67); Lilyfield, New South Wales, Australia
- Batting: Right-handed
- Role: Batter; occasional wicket-keeper

International information
- National side: Australia (1984)
- Test debut (cap 96): 21 January 1984 v India
- Last Test: 21 December 1984 v England
- ODI debut (cap 34): 19 January 1984 v India
- Last ODI: 23 February 1984 v India

Domestic team information
- Years: Team
- 1979/80–1984/85: New South Wales

Career statistics
Competition	WTest	WODI	WFC	WLA
Matches	6	4	27	13
Runs scored	142	182	874	350
Batting average	15.77	91.00	24.97	35.00
100s/50s	0/1	0/2	1/5	0/2
Top score	72	77*	100	77*
Balls bowled	6	–	240	18
Wickets	0	–	1	0
Bowling average	–	–	82.00	–
5 wickets in innings	0	–	0	0
10 wickets in match	0	–	0	0
Best bowling	–	–	1/31	–
Catches/stumpings	4/–	2/0	7/–	5/0
- Source: CricketArchive, 27 January 2023

Patricia Carmel Dawson (née Kelly; born 9 July 1959) is an Australian former cricketer who played as a right-handed batter and occasional wicket-keeper. She appeared in six Test matches and four One Day Internationals for Australia in 1984. She played domestic cricket for New South Wales.
