= Shashi Gupta =

Indian cricketer (born 1964)

Personal information
- Born: 3 April 1964 (age 62); Delhi, India
- Batting: Right-handed
- Bowling: Right-arm medium

International information
- National side: India
- Test debut (cap 18): 21 January 1984 v Australia
- Last Test: 9 February 1991 v Australia
- ODI debut (cap 24): 19 January 1984 v Australia
- Last ODI: 29 July 1993 v Denmark

Career statistics
Competition	WTest	WODI
Matches	13	20
Runs scored	452	263
Batting average	28.25	20.23
100s/50s	0/0	0/1
Top score	48*	50*
Balls bowled	1,962	846
Wickets	25	15
Bowling average	31.28	23.46
5 wickets in innings	0	0
10 wickets in match	0	0
Best bowling	4/47	3/17
Catches/stumpings	2/0	3/0
- Source: CricketArchive, 17 September 2009

Shashi Gupta (born 3 April 1964) is a former Indian Test and One Day International cricketer and former National Selector of the Indian Women's Cricket Team at the Board of Control for Cricket in India (BCCI). She has played a total of 13 Tests and 20 ODIs from 1984 to 1993 including the Women's Cricket World Cup in 1993. She was the Chairperson of the Senior Women's Selection Committee at Delhi Development Cricket Association (DDCA) from 2010 to 2011. She was also the captain of Punjab Women's Cricket Team.

== Career ==
Shashi was selected to play for the State level team in Punjab between 1982-1985 and was the Captain of the team for a year during her tenure. She also played for Indian Railways Women's Cricket team.

She was then selected to play for Indian National Women's cricket team in 1984. She played for the Indian Women's cricket team from 1985 to 1993. During her tenure she represented the country in 1 Women's Cricket World Cup, played 13 Test matches and 20 One Day Internationals (ODIs). The Indian Women's Cricket team stood 4th during the World Cup she played in 1993.

Shashi served as a member of the Women's Working Committee at the Board of Cricket Control of India (BCCI) since 2015 and the National Selector for India Northern States at BCCI Women's Cricket Selection Committee from 2016 to January 2020.

In 2017 Shashi was awarded honorary life membership of the Marylebone Cricket Club (MCC) in recognition of her contribution to Women's Cricket.

Gupta has scored 11th most runs by an Indian woman cricket player in Test matches.
