= Joan Lee (cricketer) =

English cricketer (born 1952)

Personal information
- Full name: Joan Denise Lee
- Born: 4 February 1952 (age 74); Dewsbury, Yorkshire, England
- Role: Wicket-keeper

International information
- National side: England (1986)
- Only Test (cap 102): 3 July 1986 v India

Domestic team information
- Years: Team
- 1975–1986: Yorkshire

Career statistics
| Competition | WTest | WFC | WLA |
|---|---|---|---|
| Matches | 1 | 8 | 15 |
| Runs scored | 0 | 37 | 25 |
| Batting average | – | 12.33 | 8.33 |
| 100s/50s | –/– | 0/0 | 0/0 |
| Top score | – | 13 | 11* |
| Catches/stumpings | 0/0 | 5/4 | 6/0 |
- Source: CricketArchive, 21 February 2021

Joan Denise Lee (born 4 February 1952) is an English former cricketer and former member of the England women's cricket team who played as a wicket-keeper. She played in one test match, against India in 1986. She played domestic cricket for Yorkshire.
