= Julie May =

English cricketer (born 1964)

Personal information
- Full name: Julie Elizabeth May
- Born: 19 March 1964 (age 62); Dartford, Kent, England
- Batting: Right-handed
- Bowling: Right-arm off break
- Role: All-rounder

International information
- National side: England (1986)
- Test debut (cap 99): 26 June 1986 v India
- Last Test: 12 July 1986 v India

Domestic team information
- Years: Team
- 1984–1990: Kent

Career statistics
Competition	WTest	WLA
Matches	3	26
Runs scored	7	262
Batting average	3.50	14.55
100s/50s	0/0	0/0
Top score	4*	44
Balls bowled	402	1,086
Wickets	1	13
Bowling average	143.00	37.53
5 wickets in innings	0	0
10 wickets in match	0	n/a
Best bowling	1/75	3/17
Catches/stumpings	2/–	4/–
- Source: CricketArchive, 22 February 2021

Julie Elizabeth May (born 19 March 1964) is an English cricketer and former member of the England women's cricket team who played as a right-handed batter and right-arm off break bowler. She played three Test matches against India in 1986. She played domestic cricket for Kent.
