= Association Internationale des Écoles Supérieures d'Éducation Physique =

Professional association for higher education physical education

The Association Internationale des Écoles Supérieures d'Éducation Physique (AIESEP) or the International Association for Physical Education in Higher Education is the professional association for higher education physical education.

== History ==
It was founded in Portugal on 2 August 1962 by eleven sports education institutions.

== Function ==
It works with the International Council of Sport Science and Physical Education (ICSSPE), which has a broader remit, and the FIEP, which has a European outlook.

It disseminates best practice in physical education at the university level internationally.

== World Conventions ==
- 1990 Loughborough University - Anne, Princess Royal opened the convention at 12.30pm on Friday 20 July; it was the first time that the annual five-day convention had been held in the UK; the theme of the convention was Moving towards Excellence, with topics on sports coaching, and around 400 delegates attending from around the world; it was partly paid for by the British Council of Physical Recreation (now called the Sport and Recreation Alliance); Princess Anne presented the AIESEP Scientific Prize, and gave a talk, attended by AIESEP leader John Cheffers, and the university's chancellor and vice-chancellor, Den Davies, and the chairman of Leicestershire County Council Princess Anne talked of morality in sport, and the wider effects of sport, and looking at the code of conduct of the British Institute of Sports Coaches (now called UK Coaching)
- 2015 at the European University of Madrid (Universidad Europea, School of Sports Science) from 8–11 July
- 2018 at the University of Edinburgh until 28 July

== See also ==
- INSEP
- Fédération internationale d’éducation physique (FIEP), headquartered in Belgium
- World Association for Sports Management
