= New Road, Worcester =

Cricket ground

Coordinates: 52°11′21″N 2°13′37″W

Visit Worcestershire New Road
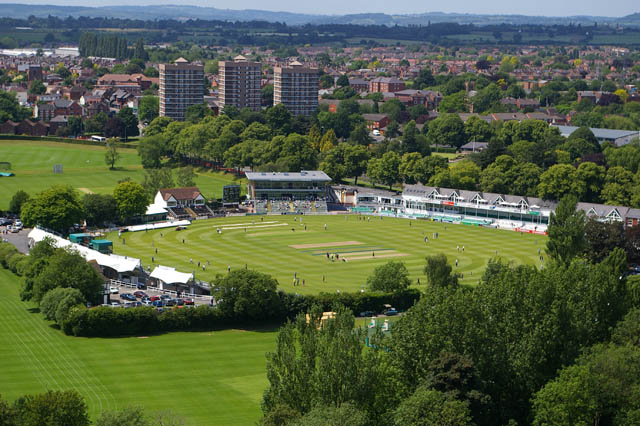
- Interactive map of Visit Worcestershire New Road

Ground information
- Location: Worcester, Worcestershire, England
- Country: England
- Establishment: 1896
- Capacity: 4,900
- End names
- New Road End Diglis End

International information
- First men's ODI: 13 June 1983: West Indies v Zimbabwe
- Last men's ODI: 22 May 1999: Sri Lanka v Zimbabwe
- First women's Test: 30 June – 3 July 1951: England v Australia
- Last women's Test: 10–13 July 2009: England v Australia
- First women's ODI: 1 July 2000: England v South Africa
- Last women's ODI: 6 September 2026: England v Ireland
- Only women's T20I: 23 July 2022: England v South Africa

Team information
Worcestershire	(1896–present)
- As of 30 June 2024; Source: cricinfo

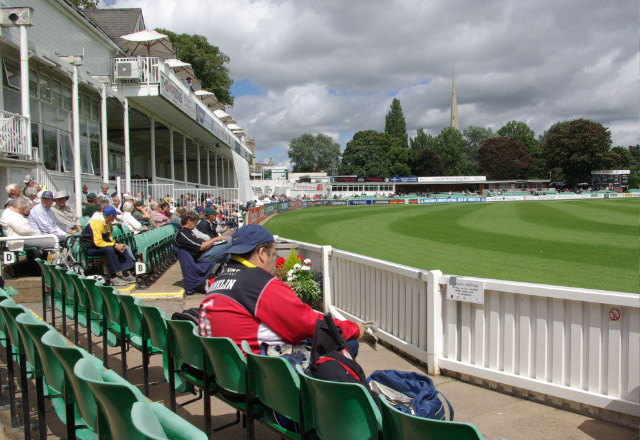

Visit Worcestershire New Road is a cricket ground in the English city of Worcester. The home of Worcestershire County Cricket Club since 1896, it has been rated as one of the world's most beautiful cricket grounds.

== Overview ==
The ground is situated in central Worcester, on the west bank of the River Severn, overlooked by Worcester Cathedral on the opposite bank. Immediately to the northwest is a road called New Road, part of the A44, hence the name. To the northwest is Cripplegate Park.

Originally, the freehold to the ground was owned by the Dean and Chapter of Worcester Cathedral. In 1896, the leasehold was obtained by club secretary Paul Foley upon payment of a modest rent, and the first match (against Berkshire) was played there on 28–29 July of the following year. At the time, Worcestershire was part of the newly created Minor Counties Championship, which Foley had been largely responsible in establishing. Having won the competition in its first four years, from 1895 to 1898, the club applied successfully for first-class status. The first County Championship match at New Road was held on 4–6 May 1899, when the home team lost to Yorkshire by 11 runs. The land was finally purchased in 1976 for the sum of £30,000. The capacity of the ground is 4,900, small by first-class standards.

There is a small cricket shop located just outside the ground, selling cricket equipment, clothing, books and accessories. This shop opened in July 2008, replacing a long-standing older shop inside the ground. The shop also contains the administrative office for ticket sales and enquiries.

Elton John performed to a crowd of 17,000 at the ground in June 2006.

== Flooding ==
In winter, the ground is often submerged by water from the nearby river, and was severely affected by the floods of July 2007. These caused more than one million pounds in damage, and cricket did not return to the ground until the beginning of the following season.

Over the winter of 2023–24 the ground was flooded seven times, which resulted in the first two home games of the 2024 County Championship being played at the Chester Road North Ground in Kidderminster. In April 2024, Worcestershire's board confirmed that they were looking at options to secure the club's long-term future, possibly including a move away from New Road. Speaking on the BBC's Test Match Special podcast, chief executive Ashley Giles explained that of the 30 occasions on which the ground had been flooded since 1899, 19 incidents had occurred in the past 24 years, and the problem was expected to get worse due to climate change.

== International cricket ==
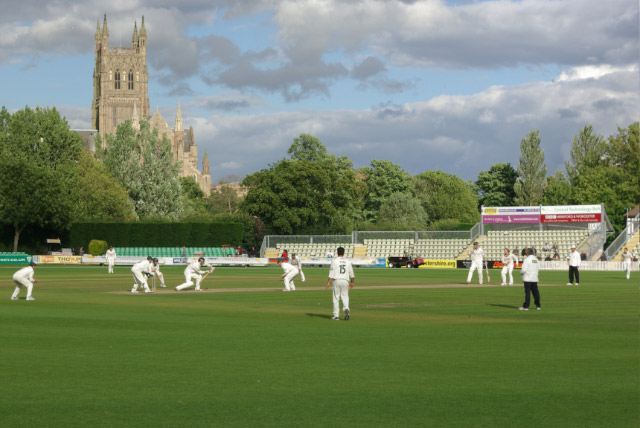
New Road with Worcester Cathedral

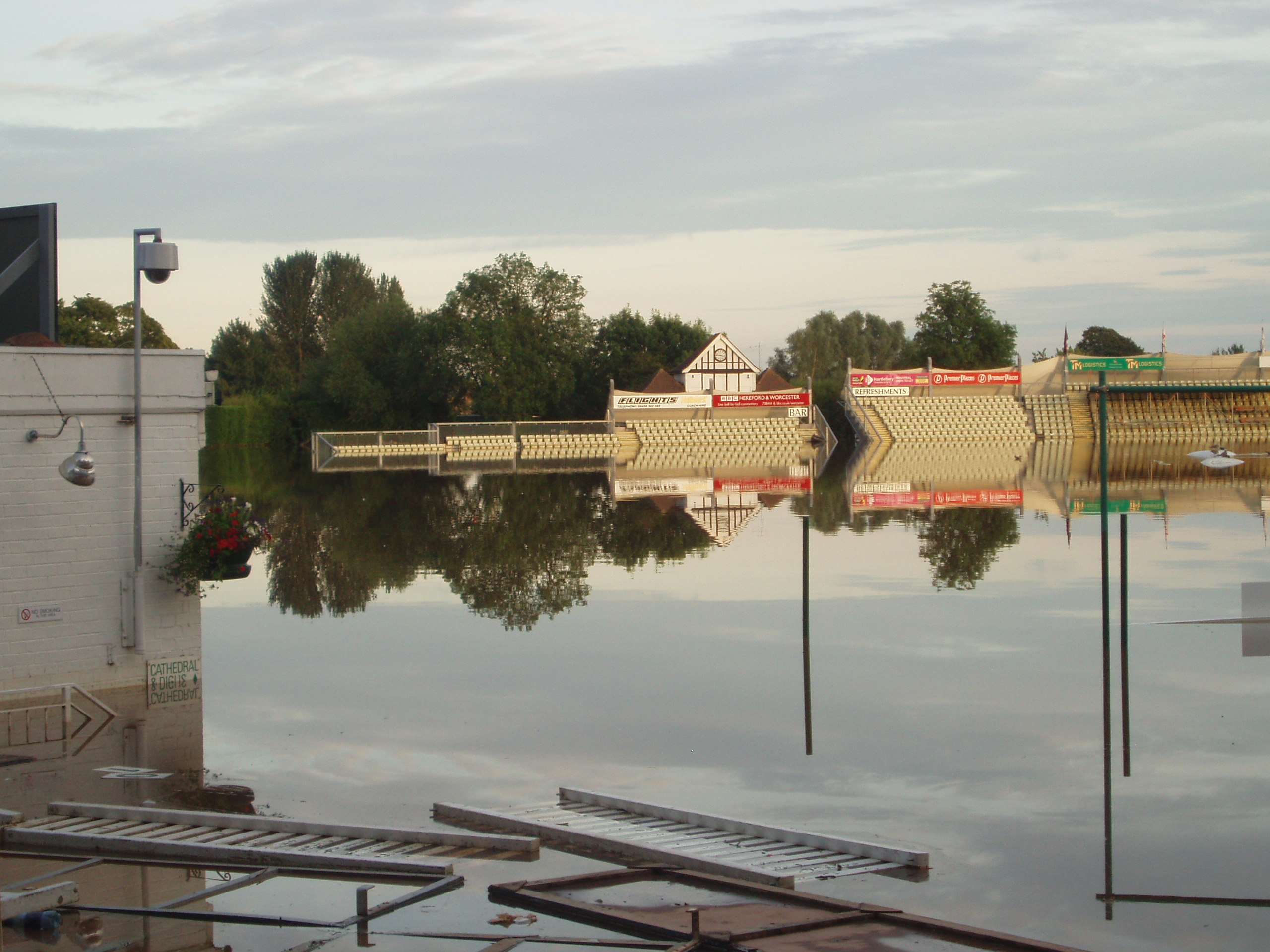
New Road flooded during the 2007 season, leading to two abandoned matches.

New Road has hosted three men's One Day Internationals: one in the 1983 World Cup, when Gordon Greenidge scored 105 not out (the only men's international century at the ground) to take the West Indies to an eight-wicket victory over Zimbabwe; and two in the 1999 World Cup: a six-wicket victory for Australia over Scotland and a four-wicket victory for Sri Lanka over Zimbabwe.

The ground has also seen nine Women's Test matches between 1951 and 2009, including the England Women's decisive victory during the 2005 Ashes, in which Katherine Brunt scored 52 and took match figures of 9/111; Brunt also took a first-innings 6/69 in the 2009 Ashes Test at Worcester, which was drawn. It has staged seven Women's ODI between 2000 and 2021, and one Women's Twenty20 International in 2022.

The England Lions (formerly England A) played a four-day match against the Australian touring team at New Road in 2009; in a drawn match, Mike Hussey (150) and Marcus North (191 not out) made runs, while Worcestershire's Stephen Moore responded with 120; Brett Lee took 6/76.

== Records ==
=== Men's One-Day Internationals ===
- Matches: 3
- Highest team total:
  218/2 (48.3 overs) by West Indies v. Zimbabwe, 1983
- Lowest team total:
  181/7 (50 overs) by Scotland v. Australia, 1999
- Highest individual innings:
  105* by Gordon Greenidge for West Indies v. Zimbabwe, 1983
- Best bowling in an innings:
  3–30 by Pramodya Wickramasinghe for Sri Lanka v. Zimbabwe, 1999

=== Women's Tests ===
- Matches: 9
- Highest team total:
  427/4 declared by Australia Women v. England Women, 1998
- Lowest team total:
  63 by New Zealand Women v. England Women, 1954
- Highest individual innings:
  190 by Sandhya Agarwal, India Women v. England Women, 1986
- Best bowling in an innings:
  7/34 by Gill McConway, England Women v. India Women, 1986
- Best bowling in a match:
  9/107 by Mary Duggan for England Women v. Australia Women, 1951
  9/111 by Katherine Brunt for England Women v. Australia Women, 2005

=== First-class ===
- Highest team total:
  701/4 declared by Leicestershire v. Worcestershire, 1906
  701/6 declared by Worcestershire v Surrey, 2007
- Lowest team total:
  30 by Hampshire v. Worcestershire, 1903
- Triple centuries:
  331* by Jack Robertson for Middlesex v. Worcestershire, 1949
  315* by Graeme Hick for Worcestershire v. Durham, 2002
  311* by Glenn Turner for Worcestershire v. Warwickshire, 1982
- Ten wickets in an innings:
  10–51 by Jack Mercer for Glamorgan v. Worcestershire, 1936
  10–76 by Jack White for Somerset v. Worcestershire, 1921
- Fifteen wickets in a match:
  15–106 by Reg Perks for Worcestershire v. Essex, 1937
  15–175 by Jack White for Somerset v. Worcestershire, 1921

=== List A ===
- Highest team total:
  404/3 (60 overs) by Worcestershire v. Devon, 1987
- Lowest team total:
  45 (23.4 overs) by Hampshire v. Worcestershire, 1988
- Highest individual innings:
  172* by Graeme Hick v. Devon, 1987
- Best bowling in an innings:
  6–14 by Jack Flavell for Worcestershire v. Lancashire, 1963
  6–14 by Howard Cooper for Yorkshire v. Worcestershire, 1975
  6–16 by Shoaib Akhtar for Worcestershire v. Gloucestershire, 2005

== See also ==
- List of cricket grounds in England and Wales
